= 1986 in Japanese music =

In 1986 (Shōwa 61), Japanese music was released on records, and there were charts, awards, contests and festivals.

During that year, Japan continued to have the second largest music market in the world.

== Awards, contests and festivals ==
The 15th Tokyo Music Festival was held on 30 March 1986. The 28th Osaka International Festival (Japanese: 大阪国際フェスティバル) was held from 1 to 25 April 1986. The 31st Yamaha Popular Song Contest was held on 11 May 1986. The 32nd Yamaha Popular Song Contest was held on 28 September 1986. The final of the 17th World Popular Song Festival was held on 26 October 1986. The final of the 15th FNS Music Festival was held on 16 December 1986. The 28th Japan Record Awards were held on 31 December 1986. The 37th NHK Kōhaku Uta Gassen was held on 31 December 1986.

== Number one singles ==
The following reached number 1 on the weekly Oricon Singles Chart:

Issue date	Song	Artist(s)
6 January	"Koi ni Ochite: Fall in Love"	Akiko Kobayashi
13 January	"Fuyu no Opera-Glass"	Eri Nitta
20 January	"Fuyu no Opera-Glass"	Eri Nitta
27 January	"Fuyu no Opera-Glass"	Eri Nitta
3 February	"Banana no Namida"	Ushiroyubi Sasaregumi
10 February	"Kuchibiru Network"	Yukiko Okada
17 February	"Desire (Jōnetsu)"	Akina Nakamori
24 February	Broken Sunset	Momoko Kikuchi
3 March	"Jā ne"	Onyanko Club
10 March	"Kisetsu Hazure no Koi"	Akie Yoshizawa
17 March	"Kisetsu Hazure no Koi"	Akie Yoshizawa
24 March	"My Revolution"	Misato Watanabe
31 March	"Aoi Station"	Sonoko Kawai
7 April	"Aoi Station"	Sonoko Kawai
14 April	"Watashi wa Rika-chan"	Nyangilas
21 April	"Koi no Rope wo Hodokanai de"	Eri Nitta
28 April	"Koi no Rope wo Hodokanai de"	Eri Nitta
5 May	"Otto Chikan!"	Onyanko Club
12 May	"Zō-san no Scanty"	Ushiroyubi Sasaregumi
19 May	"Natsu wo Matenai"	Sayuri Kokushō
26 May	"Natsu Iro Kataomoi"	Momoko Kikuchi
2 June	"Kaze no Invitation"	Satomi Fukunaga
9 June	"Gypsy Queen"	Akina Nakamori
16 June	"Song for U.S.A"	The Checkers
23 June	"Ajisai Bashi"	Sanae Jonouchi
30 June	"Jibun de Yūnomo Nan Desukeredo"	Nyangilas
7 July	"Cinderella-tachi e no Dengon"	Mamiko Takai
14 July	"Saikai no Labyrinth"	Sonoko Kawai
21 July	"Diamond Eyes"	Shonentai
28 July	"Hitomi ni Yakusoku"	Minayo Watanabe
4 August	"Osaki ni Shitsurei"	Onyanko Club
11 August	"Fushigi na Tejina no Yoni"	Eri Nitta
18 August	"Skipped Beat"	Kuwata Band
25 August	"Noble Red no Toki"	Sayuri Kokushō
1 September	"Aozora no Kakera"	Yuki Saito
8 September	"Nagisa no Kagikakko"	Ushiroyubi Sasaregumi
15 September	"Say Yes!"	Momoko Kikuchi
22 September	"Kagami no Naka no Watashi"	Akie Yoshizawa
29 September	"Melody"	Mamiko Takai
6 October	"Fin"	Akina Nakamori
13 October	"Cha-Cha-Cha"	Akemi Ishii
20 October	"Shin Kōkyū Shite"	Marina Watanabe
27 October	"Yuki no Kaerimichi"	Minayo Watanabe
3 November	"Kanashii Yoru wo Tomete"	Sonoko Kawai
10 November	"Koi wa Question"	Onyanko Club
17 November	"One Day"	Kuwata Band
24 November	"Naisho de Love Story"	Eri Nitta
1 December	"Waza-Ari!"	Ushiroyubi Sasaregumi
8 December	"Ballad no Yoni Nemure"	Shonentai
15 December	"Ano Natsu no Bike"	Sayuri Kokushō
22 December	"Naimono Nedari no I Want You"	C-C-B
29 December	"Yakusoku"	Mamiko Takai

== Number one albums ==
Music Labo

The following reached number 1 on the Music Labo chart:

- 13 January: First Finale - S. Kiyotaka & Omega Tribe
- 20 January: Anzen Chitai IV - Anzen Chitai
- 27 January, 3 February, 10 February and 17 February: Rebecca IV ~maybe tomorrow~ - Rebecca
- 3 March: Modern Time - Kōji Kikkawa
- 10 March and 17 March: Realistic - Junichi Inagaki
- 24 March: Yume Catalogue - Onyanko Club
- 8 April: Flower - Checkers
- 15 April, 21 April and 28 April: Best - Akina Nakamori
- 5 May, 19 May and 26 May: Pocket Music - Tatsuro Yamashita
- 12 May: Eri - Eri Nitta
- 2 June: Siesta - Sonoko Kawai
- 9 June, 16 June, 23 June and 30 June: Supreme - Seiko Matsuda
- 7 July: Adventure - Momoko Kikuchi
- 14 July and 21 July: Lovin' You - Misato Watanabe
- 28 July, 11 August and 18 August: Nippon No Rock Band - Kuwata Band
- 25 August, 1 September: Fushigi - Akina Nakamori
- True Blue - Madonna
- 16 September, 23 September, 29 September, 6 October, 20 October: - J Boy - Shōgo Hamada
- 13 October: Mode De Sonoko - Sonoko Kawai
- 27 October: Fore! - Huey Lewis and the News
- 3 November, 10 November: Time - Rebecca
- 1 December: Mona Lisa - Akemi Ishii
- 8 December, 15 December and 22 December: Alarm à la mode - Yumi Matsutoya

Cash Box

The following reached number 1 on the Cash Box chart:

- 11 January: Da Di Da - Yumi Matsutoya
- 18 January and 25 January: Anzen Chitai IV - Anzen Chitai
- 8 February: My Best Thanks - Akina Nakamori
- 22 February, 22 March and 29 March: Rebecca IV ~maybe tomorrow~ - Rebecca
- 19 April: Realistic - Junichi Inagaki
- 13 September and 20 September: Fushigi - Akina Nakamori
- 11 October, 1 November and 8 November: J. Boy - Shōgo Hamada
- 6 December: Time - Rebecca
- 13 December: Beat Emotion - Boøwy
- 27 December: Alarm à la mode - Yumi Matsutoya

Oricon

The following reached number 1 on the Oricon chart:

- 17 November: Beat Emotion - Boøwy

== Annual charts ==
Akemi Ishii's Cha-Cha-Cha was number 1 in the Oricon annual singles chart.

== Music industry ==
120,000 titles were available on CD.

== Film and television ==
The music of Uhohho tankentai, by Saeko Suzuki, won the 41st Mainichi Film Award for Best Music. The music of House on Fire, and Rikon Shinai Onna (Japanese: 離婚しない女), by Takayuki Inoue won the 10th Japan Academy Film Prize for Best Music (awarded in 1987). The music of Castle in the Sky is by Joe Hisaishi and includes the song Kimi Wo Nosete by Azumi Inoue. Songs by Mitsuko Horie, from the cancelled anime "Kamen Senshi Lavithunder" and from its commercial, were released on an EP and on the album Sing It!

The first broadcast of Music Station was on 24 October 1986.

== Radio ==
The last time Ryuichi Sakamoto presented the Tuesday Sound Street was on 18 March 1986.

== Video games ==
Koji Kondo composed the music for The Legend of Zelda.

== Other singles released ==
- Nonfiction Ecstasy by Akina Nakamori
- Flamingo in Paradise and Dance Beat wa Yoake made by Yōko Oginome
- Toki no Nagare ni Mi o Makase by Teresa Teng
- 100% Danjo Kōsai by Kyoko Koizumi
- Kanashimi yo Konnichi wa and Doyōbi no Tamanegi by Yuki Saito
- Kimi ha 1000% by 1986 Omega Tribe
- Iro White Blend, Close Up, Jingi Aishite Moraimasu, Tsuiteru ne Notteru ne and Waku Waku Sasete by Miho Nakayama
- To-Search by Buck-Tick
- Amagi-goe by Sayuri Ishikawa
- 21 October: Yōko Nagayama released "Venus"
- 29 October: Roppongi Junjōha by Yōko Oginome

== Other albums and EPs released ==
- Crimson by Akina Nakamori
- Futurista by Ryuichi Sakamoto
- Raspberry Wind, Heartbeat Express and Non-Stopper by Yōko Oginome
- Kiss de Crime by Princess Princess
- Promise in the History by Mari Hamada
- 36.5 °C by Miyuki Nakajima
- Sun Sun by Casiopea
- One Pattern by P-Model
- Lightning Strikes by Loudness
- S.P.O.R.T.S. by T-Square
- Panic the World by Onyanko Club
- Splash by Satomi Fukunaga
- Chime by Yuki Saito
- Navigator by 1986 Omega Tribe
- Summer Breeze, Virgin Flight '86: Miho Nakayama First Concert and Exotique by Miho Nakayama
- Shake It Paradise by Toshinobu Kubota
- Queendom and Ways by Show-Ya
- Green by Hiroshi Yoshimura
- Trouble in Paradise by Anri

== See also ==
- Timeline of Japanese music
- 1986 in Japan
- 1986 in music
- w:ja:1986年の音楽
