= Non-Stopper =

Non-Stopper: Yōko Oginome "The Beat" Special

Studio album by Yōko Oginome
- Released: December 16, 1986
- Recorded: 1985–1986
- Genre: J-pop; dance-pop; teen pop
- Length: 38:42
- Language: Japanese
- Label: Victor

Yōko Oginome chronology
Heartbeat Express: Sōshun Monogatari Memorial Album (1986)	Non-Stopper: Yōko Oginome "The Beat" Special (1986)	Route 246 Connexion (1987)

Singles from Non-Stopper: Yōko Oginome "The Beat" Special
- 1. "Roppongi Junjōha" Released: October 29, 1986

Non-Stopper: Yōko Oginome "The Beat" Special (ノン・ストッパー 荻野目洋子 ザ・ビート・スペシャル, Non Sutoppā Oginome Yōko Za Bīto Supesharu) is the fifth studio album by Japanese singer Yōko Oginome. Released through Victor Entertainment on December 16, 1986, the album features the hit singles "Dance Beat wa Yoake made" and "Roppongi Junjōha", plus remixes of "Dancing Hero (Eat You Up)" and "Flamingo in Paradise" and Japanese-language covers of Shocking Blue's "Venus", Paul Chiten's "Melting Point", and Finzy Kontini's "Cha-Cha-Cha". The album was reissued on March 24, 2010 with ten bonus karaoke tracks as part of Oginome's 25th anniversary celebration.

The album hit No. 1 on Oricon's albums chart and sold over 691,000 copies.

== Track listing ==
Side A
No.	Title	Lyrics	Music	Arrangement	Length
1.	"Dancing Hero (Eat You Up) (Modern Version)" (Danshingu Hīrō (Īto Yū Appu) (ダンシング・ヒーロー (Eat You Up)))	Hitoshi Shinohara	Angelina Kyte; Anthony Baker	Kōji Makaino	4:04
2.	"Dance Beat wa Yoake made" (Dansu Bīto wa Yoake made (Dance Beatは夜明けまで; "Dance Beat Until Dawn"))	Hiromi Mori	Nobody	Akira Nishihira	3:38
3.	"Flamingo in Paradise (Dance Mix)" (Furamingo in Paradaisu (フラミンゴ in パラダイス))	Masao Urino	Nobody	Motoki Funayama	3:58
4.	"Venus" (Vīnasu (ヴィーナス))	Mori	Robbie van Leeuwen	Nishihira	3:38
5.	"Melting Point"	Urino; Sue Sheridan	Paul Chiten	Shirō Sagisu	3:51
Total length:					19:11

Side B
No.	Title	Lyrics	Music	Arrangement	Length
1.	"Roppongi Junjōha" ((六本木純情派; "Roppongi Pure-Heart Clique"))	Urino	Akihiro Yoshimi	Hiroshi Shinkawa	3:28
2.	"D2D"	Masumi Kawamura	Tsunehiro Izumi	Shinkawa	4:18
3.	"Nonstop Dancer"	Kawamura	Tetsuya Komuro	Nobuyuki Shimizu	4:29
4.	"Cha-Cha-Cha"	Shinohara; G. Boido	B. Reitano; B. Rosellini; F. Baldoni; F. Reitano	Nishihira	3:36
5.	"Hitomi ni I Love You" ((瞳にI Love You; "I Love You in My Eyes"))	Mori	Izumi	Sagisu	3:55
Total length:					19:47

2010 bonus tracks
No.	Title	Lyrics	Music	Arrangement	Length
11.	"Dancing Hero (Eat You Up) (Modern Version)" (Original Karaoke)	Shinohara	Kyte; Baker	Makaino	4:05
12.	"Dance Beat wa Yoake made" (Original Karaoke)	Mori	Nobody	Nishihira	3:38
13.	"Flamingo in Paradise (Dance Mix)" (Original Karaoke)	Urino	Nobody	Funayama	3:58
14.	"Venus" (Original Karaoke)	Mori	van Leeuwen	Nishihira	3:38
15.	"Melting Point" (Original Karaoke)	Urino; Sheridan	Chiten	Sagisu	3:51
16.	"Roppongi Junjōha" (Original Karaoke)	Urino	Yoshimi	Shinkawa	3:27
17.	"D2D" (Original Karaoke)	Kawamura	Izumi	Shinkawa	4:18
18.	"Nonstop Dancer" (Original Karaoke)	Kawamura	Komuro	Shimizu	4:28
19.	"Cha-Cha-Cha" (Original Karaoke)	Shinohara; G. Boido	B. Reitano; B. Rosellini; F. Baldoni; F. Reitano	Nishihira	3:36
20.	"Hitomi ni I Love You" (Original Karaoke)	Mori	Izumi	Sagisu	3:46
Total length:					38:49

== Charts ==
Weekly charts

Chart (1987)	Peak position
Japanese Albums (Oricon)	1

Year-end charts

Chart (1987)	Peak position
Japanese Albums (Oricon)	1

== See also ==
- 1986 in Japanese music
