= Teruo Gotō =

Japanese musician

Teruo Gotō 後藤輝夫
- Born: February 19, 1953 (age 73); Sakata, Yamagata, Japan
- Instruments: Saxophone; Flute; Bongo
- Years active: 1979–present
- Website: goto-teruo.com

Teruo Gotō (後藤輝夫, Gotō Teruo; born February 19, 1953, in Sakata, Yamagata, Japan) is a Japanese saxophonist and percussionist.

== Biography ==
After he graduated from Sakata Chuo High School, he attended an art university to study photography, but spent more time playing saxophone in a jazz group. In 1979, he joined Junko Ohashi and Minoya Central Station releasing the album Full House that same year and Hot Life a year later. During the production of Full House, Gotō met drummer Marty Bracey as they were both participants of the backing band.

In 1987, he joined the band 1986 Omega Tribe as a backing member along with Bracey, keyboardist Tetsuya Osaka and bassist Shigeru Watanabe. The members also participated in the band's tours, with Watanabe being replaced the same year by Wornell Jones. Gotō and the others stayed as members until the band's disbandment in 1991. That same year, he participated in the production of The Moritaka as a performer.

In 2004, he participated in S. Kiyotaka & Omega Tribe's 2004 reunion concert First Finale 2. Since then, he was performed with the band's singer Kiyotaka Sugiyama multiple times as well as Hirokuni Korekata of Korenos. In 2007, he released the album Beat From The Earth with Yūji Imamura.

In 2014, Gotō released the album But Beautiful with guitarist Jun Satsuma. Songs from the album were used in the movie Yukiguni. In 2015, he formed the band B-EDGE alongside Bracey, Jones, Tomoharu Hani and Nishiyama "Hank" Fumio. In 2019, he formed a jazz unit called Fool's Paradise.

== Discography ==
=== Studio albums ===
Title	Album details
Beat From The Earth (with Yuji Imamura)	Released: April 25, 2007; Label: What's New Records
But Beautiful (with Jun Satsuma)	Released: July 23, 2014; Label: Kameyoshi Records
