= Marty Bracey =

American drummer

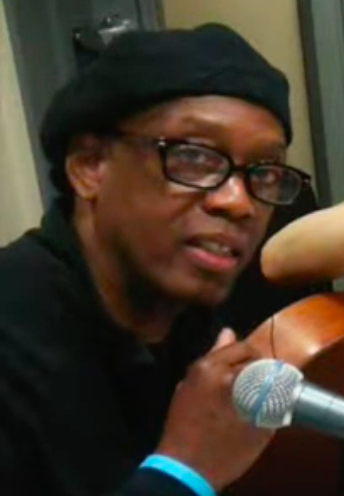

Background information
- Born: Martin K. Bracey; September 17, 1954 (age 71); Chicago, Illinois, United States
- Occupations: Drummer, percussionist
- Instrument: Drums
- Years active: 1972 – present
- Website: www.martybracey.com

Japanese name
- Katakana: マーティー・ブレイシー
- Education: North Chicago Community High School

Martin K. Bracey (born September 17, 1954), is an American drummer and percussionist mostly known for being in many Japanese bands. He has worked with Minako Honda, Junko Yagami, Junko Ohashi and Kenji Ozawa as well as bands such as Omega Tribe and Monta & Brothers.

== Biography ==
Bracey started playing drums at the age of 12. At the age of 18, Bracey made his professional debut in America performing for Jackie Wilson, The Chi-Lites, and Tyrone Davis during live performances.

He came to Japan in 1973, making his professional debut in Japan in 1978. He started in Japan as the drummer for Rie Nakahara's song "Tokyo Lullaby," which peaked at No. 9 on the charts, as well as being the drummer for Izumi Kobayashi & Flying Mimi Band. Two years later, he joined the Japanese band Monta & Brothers, drumming for the single "Dancing All Night" which was a No. 1 single on the Oricon charts for 10 consecutive weeks. In 1984, he formed Marty & Mystics with keyboardist Keisaku Takahashi and bassist Masahiko Takeuchi, releasing only one album. In 1987, he was hired as a drummer for the Japanese band 1986 Omega Tribe, helping with the band during their rename to Carlos Toshiki & Omega Tribe and their debut album. He was also present during their final concerts in 1991. During this time, Bracey formed the band Silk with Wornell Jones and Tetsuya Osaka, both members of Omega Tribe's backing band, and released one album and single in 1988.

In 2003, he released the album Soul Shogun. In 2015, he formed the band B-EDGE along with Jones and Teruo Gotō, all were members of Omega Tribe's backing band. Japanese Brazilian singer Carlos Toshiki, the lead singer of 1986 Omega Tribe and Carlos Toshiki & Omega Tribe, joined the band briefly in 2017.

== Discography ==
=== As a solo artist ===
Year	Title	Label
1980	Mystic Heart	Agartha
2003	Soul Shogun	Musion

=== With Izumi Kobayashi & Flying Mimi Band ===
Year	Title	Label
1978	Orange Sky - Endless Summer	Philips
1978	Sea Flight	Philips

=== With Marty & Mystics ===
Year	Title	Label
1984	Arrival	Electric Bird

=== With Silk ===
Year	Title	Label
1988	Silk	Seven Seas
