= Omega Tribe =

Omega Tribe may refer to:

- Omega Tribe (British band), a British anarcho-punk band formed in 1981
- Omega Tribe (music project), a Japanese city pop music project from 1983 to 1994
  - S. Kiyotaka & Omega Tribe, a city pop band from 1983 to 1985
  - Carlos Toshiki & Omega Tribe, a city pop band from 1986 to 1991
