= Kimi ha 1000% =

Single by 1986 Omega Tribe

from the album Navigator
- B-side: "Your Graduation"
- Released: May 1, 1986
- Genre: City pop; sophisti-pop; synthpop
- Length: 4:12
- Label: VAP
- Composer: Tsunehiro Izumi
- Lyricist: Masako Arikawa
- Producer: Koichi Fujita

1986 Omega Tribe singles chronology
"Kimi ha 1000%" (1986)	"Super Chance" (1986)

"Kimi ha 1000%" (Japanese: 君は1000%, Hepburn: Kimi wa sen-pāsento) (Note: The Japanese character ha (は) is used as a particle due to the character kimi (君), and is pronounced as wa in the song. Streaming services previously used the title "Kimi wa 1000%" as the romanization before it was changed by VAP in 2022; most covers of the song still use "Kimi wa 1000%" as the romanization.) is the debut single by the Japanese band 1986 Omega Tribe released by VAP on May 1, 1986. Carlos Toshiki's professional debut as a vocalist, it is considered one of Toshiki's signature songs alongside "Aquamarine no Mama de Ite" and has been covered by multiple Japanese artists. The song peaked at 5th place on the Oricon Singles Chart.

== Background ==
Koichi Fujita, the producer of the Omega Tribe project, scouted Japanese Brazilian singer Carlos Toshiki after being given a demo tape of Toshiki, with Fujita creating a new group part with Teruka Kurokawa, Shinji Takashima, and Toshitsugu Nishihara, the latter two were previous members of the band S. Kiyotaka & Omega Tribe. To help Toshiki get into the aesthetic of the band, as well as to get to know him better, Fujita took him to Hawaii. During the trip, Toshiki commented on the similarity between the Japanese word for "thousand" (千, sen) and the Portuguese word for "hundred" (cem), which Fujita also found interesting, contacting a lyricist to create a song based on the pronunciations. While recording the song, Toshiki sang without understanding most of the lyrics.

== Commercial performance and usage ==
"Kimi ha 1000%" was an instant success, peaking at 5th place on the Oricon Singles Chart and selling 350,000 copies, with the popularity of "Kimi ha 1000%" and the unique voice making Toshiki popular as an idol. The single was used as the theme song for the Nippon TV drama Shin Netchū Jidai Sengen, starring Ikue Sakakibara.

== Track listing ==
Single
No.	Title	Lyrics	Music	Arrangement	Length
1.	"Kimi ha 1000% (君は1000%)"	Masako Arikawa	Tsunehiro Izumi	Hiroshi Shinkawa	4:12
2.	"Your Graduation"	Arikawa	Izumi	Izumi	4:53

== Charts ==
=== Weekly charts ===
Chart (1986)	Peak position
Oricon Singles Chart	5

== Other versions ==
- Singer Yuko Ando covered song in her 2006 album The Still Steel Down.
- Singer Nishikawa Shigeomi covered the song on his 2007 cover album 80's Hit Parade Vol. 1.
- Actor Sarutoki Minagawa covered the song for his 2016 solo debut album Ore de īno Kai ~Minato Kaworu, utai Sugiru~ with the music arrangement by composer Taku Tomizawa.
- Singer Toyono covered the song on her album Kurokami No Samba after singing it live for a crowd, covering it in Portuguese.
- Toshiki with his band Carlos Toshiki & B-EDGE covered the song in their 2018 album Nova Nostalgia, as well as covering the song as part of his live performances.
- The boyband EnGene covered the song as their fourth single in 2019, with Toshiki supporting the cover and taking a photo with the group wearing merchandise of the single.
- South Korean producer Night Tempo released a future funk remix of the song alongside a remix of "Older Girl" from the album Navigator in 2019.
- Japanese duo Deen covered the song in their 2021 album Pop In City ~For Covers Only~, which included many city pop covers.
- The boyband Super Dragon covered the song alongside Kenji Sawada's "Darling" in 2021. A future funk remix of the cover by French producer Vantage was included in the group's 2022 album Force to Forth.
- Idol group The Dance for Philosophy covered the song for their 2022 EP Red Carnival.
- Voice actress and singer Ai Furihata covered the song for her 2022 mini album Memories of Romance in Summer.
- Tokyo electronic duo Haretokidoki covered the song in 2022, which also included a remix by Japanese producer brinq.
