= Aquamarine no Mama de Ite =

1988 single by Omega Tribe

Single by Carlos Toshiki & Omega Tribe

from the album Be Yourself
- B-side: "Kairyū no Naka no Shimajima"
- Released: August 10, 1988
- Genre: City pop; album-oriented rock
- Label: VAP
- Composer: Tsunehiro Izumi
- Lyricist: Masao Urino
- Producer: Koichi Fujita

Carlos Toshiki & Omega Tribe singles chronology
"Down Town Mystery" (1988)	"Aquamarine no Mama de Ite" (1988)	"Reiko" (1989)

"Aquamarine no Mama de Ite" (Japanese: アクアマリンのままでいて, Hepburn: Akuamarin no Mama de te) is the second single by Carlos Toshiki & Omega Tribe released by VAP on August 10, 1988. The seventh single during vocalist Carlos Toshiki's era of Omega Tribe, it is considered one of Toshiki's signature songs alongside "Kimi ha 1000%" and has been covered by multiple Japanese artists. The single was the theme song for the Fuji Television drama Dakishimetai! and peaked at 3rd place on the Oricon Singles Chart.

== Background and usage ==
The song was written by lyricist Masao Urino with the production of Koichi Fujita, who provided the beginning lyrics for the song. The single was used as the theme song for the Fuji Television drama Dakishimetai! starring Atsuko Asano and Yūko Asano, and whenever the two Asanos were introduced during a program, it was used as the background music. The song was subsequently used in Dakishimetai! specials and sequels. The song was included in the band's 1989 album Be Yourself with a rearranged composition.

== Commercial performance and usage ==
The song was the highest-performing single from the band as well as the whole project, peaking at 3rd place on the Oricon Singles Chart with 90,990 sales. The single would be the last to enter the top ten in the Oricon charts and other ranking programs.

== Track listing ==
Single
No.	Title	Lyrics	Music	Arrangement	Length
1.	"Aquamarine no Mama de Ite (アクアマリンのままでいて)"	Masao Urino	Tsunehiro Izumi	Hiroshi Shinkawa, Jerry Hey	4:30
2.	"Kairyū no Naka no Shimajima (海流のなかの島々)"	Shun Taguchi	Izumi, Shinkawa	Shinkawa	5:04

== Charts ==
=== Weekly charts ===
Chart (1988)	Peak position
Oricon	3

== Other versions ==
- Every Little Thing covered the song in their 2014 album Fun-Fare. The cover was used as the theme song of Dakishimetai! Forever, a sequel to the original Dakishimetai! series.
- Singer Hitomitoi covered the song as part of the 2014 cover album Twilight Time, which included other artists covering city pop songs.
- Singer Mizuno Mari covered the song as part the 2017 cover album Sakushi-ka Urino Masao Hits Covers, which had covers of lyricist Masao Urino's songs that he wrote.
- Japanese-American jazz band Carlos Toshiki & B-EDGE, which consisted Toshiki and some of the former backing members of the band, covered the song in their 2018 album Nova Nostalgia.
- Wrestler and comedian Makoto Izubuchi and Shinya Saito from the duo Onigawara covered the song in 2020, with the song being included in the compilation album Slenderie Ideal.
