= Offline Love =

- オフライン ラブ
- Genre: Reality
- Directed by: Masato Maeda
- Country of origin: Japan
- Original language: Japanese
- No. of seasons: 1
- No. of episodes: 10

Production
- Producer: Sayaka Matsumoto
- Production locations: Nice, France
- Running time: 60 minutes
- Production company: East

Original release
- Network: Netflix
- Release: February 18, 2025

Offline Love (Japanese:オフライン ラブ) is a Japanese reality dating show set in Nice, France. The series placed ten Japanese singles in Nice, without access to cell phones and with limited language skills, in order to meet each other organically. Participants also traveled to nearby cities and towns via the mechanism of a wish letter, which allowed them to bring one other prospective partner on a day-long excursion. The theme song is "Us" by Gracie Abrams featuring Taylor Swift.

== Reception ==
Overall, the series was well received. Kayti Burt in Time Magazine called the series "a fascinating look at what happens when we let go of the things we think we need." In The Daily Beast, Jon O'Brien described the show as "comforting", and Decider stated Offline Love was "a fun throwback combination of a travelogue and dating show."

== Cast ==
- Kyoko Koizumi (Co-host)
- Kuruma Takahira (Co-host)
- Kemuri Matsui (Co-host)
- Atsushi Arai (contestant)
- Aru Sakurada (contestant)
- Sho Kitani (contestant)
- Kensuke Omodaka (contestant)
- Yudai Shimamura (contestant)
- Kanaka (contestant)
- Tohko Asai (contestant)
- Nanami Asahi (contestant)
- Maho (contestant)
- Mimi (contestant)
