= Toshiki Takahashi =

Toshiki Takahashi may refer to:

- Toshiki Takahashi, better known as Carlos Toshiki (born 1964), Brazilian singer-songwriter
- Toshiki Takahashi (footballer) (高橋 利樹, born 1998), Japanese footballer
