= Navigator (1986 Omega Tribe album) =

Studio album by 1986 Omega Tribe
- Released: July 23, 1986
- Studio: Nichion; Sound Inn; The Peninsula; Free Port; Sound Design, Tokyo; Sky; Smile Garage; Discomate
- Genre: City pop
- Length: 42:38
- Label: VAP
- Producer: Koichi Fujita

1986 Omega Tribe chronology
Navigator (1986)	Crystal Night (1987)

Singles from Navigator
- 1. "Kimi ha 1000%" Released: May 1, 1986

Navigator (Japanese: ナビゲイター; Translation: Flight of the Navigator) is the debut album by 1986 Omega Tribe. The album is the most popular release of the band and charted at number 2 on the Oricon chart.

The album includes the debut song "Kimi ha 1000%", which peaked at number 6 on the Oricon charts, but had a different mix than the single's release.

== Track listing ==
Side A
No.	Title	Lyrics	Music	Arrangement	Length
1.	"Blue Reef"	Asako Yano	Shinji Takashima	Hiroshi Shinkawa	4:59
2.	"You Belong to Him"	Masako Arikawa	Toshitsugu Nishihara	Kazuo Shiina	4:44
3.	"Aquarium in Tears"	Masao Urino	Tsunehiro Izumi	Hiroshi Shinkawa	4:54
4.	"Navigator"	Koichi Fujita, Carlos Toshiki	Toshitsugu Nishihara	Motoki Funayama	4:59
5.	"Night Child"	Asako Yano	Toshitsugu Nishihara	Kazuo Shiina	4:52
Total length:					24:28

Side B
No.	Title	Lyrics	Music	Arrangement	Length
1.	"Kimi ha 1000%"	Masako Arikawa	Tsunehiro Izumi	Hiroshi Shinkawa	4:10
2.	"21 Candles"	Masako Arikawa	Tsunehiro Izumi	Hiroshi Shinkawa	4:56
3.	"Older Girl"	Koichi Fujita	Shinji Takashima	Motoki Funayama	4:16
4.	"North Shore"	Masao Urino	Tsunehiro Izumi	Hiroshi Shinkawa	4:48
Total length:					18:10

== Personnel ==
- Session co-ordinator – Velvet Line
- Design – Masami Oh-Hara
- Direction – Shigeru Matsuhashi
- Digital editing – Kenji Takeda
- Overdubbing engineer – Hiroshi Fujita, Yoshiaki Matsuoka
- Second engineers – Hiroshi Shitamiya, Junichi Fujimori, Mizuo Miura
- Executive producer – Atsushi Kitamura, Katsuhiko Endo
- Guitar, chorus – Mitsuya Kurokawa, Shinji Takashima
- Keyboards, chorus – Toshitsugu Nishihara
- Lacquer cut – Osamu Shimoju
- Mastering – Shigeru Buzawa
- Photography – Goro Iwaoka
- Producer – Koichi Fujita
- Recording, mixing – Kunihiko "Jr." Shimizu
- Vocals – Carlos Toshiki

== Charts ==
=== Weekly charts ===
Weekly chart performance for Navigator
Chart (1986)	Peak position
Japanese Albums (Oricon)	2

=== Year-end charts ===
Year-end chart performance for Navigator
Chart (1986)	Position
Japanese Albums (Oricon)	20
