= Edge of Spirit =

Japanese hardcore band

- Origin: Kobe, Hyogo, Japan
- Genres: Melodic death metal, metalcore, hardcore punk
- Years active: 1997–present
- Labels: Furious Records, OCH Label, Demons Run Amok, VAP, Amuse DCR, Indivisual Records/Sony Music Entertainment
- Members: Sho Isomoto (磯本祥); Kentaro Yamada (山田憲太郎); Hiroki Mabuchi; Keigo Takeda; Kei Nakamura
- Past members: Takafumi Inaba (稲葉孝史); Hironori Ochi (越智弘典); Shu Iwata (岩田崇); Hajime Uenoyama; Tomoyuki Yoneda
- Website: Label website

Edge of Spirit is a Japanese hardcore band formed in Kobe, Hyogo and based in Tokyo. Edge of Spirit has released four studio albums and four split albums. The band is widely known for pioneering the metalcore genre. The band toured as an opening act for Arch Enemy Japan tour in 2002 and 2004. After their 3rd album Rebirth, they toured as an opening act for Extreme The Dojo tour featuring The Haunted, Nile, and Exodus in 2006. The band toured Australia with The Rivalry and Palm in 2007, Canada and United States with Sand in 2008, and Europe with Rise of the Northstar in 2011. In April 2016, the band announced they are going on hiatus. In June 2018, the band announced their resuming from this September.

== Band members ==
Current

- Sho Isomoto (磯本祥) – vocals (1997–present)
- Kentaro Yamada (山田憲太郎) – guitar (1997–present)
- Hiroki Mabuchi – guitar (2003–present)
- Keigo Takeda – drums (2003–present)
- Kei Nakamura – bass (2015–present)

Former

- Takafumi Inaba (稲葉孝史) – guitar (1997–2002)
- Hironori Ochi (越智弘典) – bass (1997–2000)
- Shu Iwata (岩田崇) – bass (2000–2002)
- Hajime Uenoyama – bass (2003–2014)
- Tomoyuki Yoneda – drums (1997–2002)

Fill-in

- Nobuhiro Okahashi – guitar (2002), from Arrastrandose
- Koshin Seki – guitar (2012), from Sand, ex. Immortality
- Katsuyuki Ota – guitar (2013), bass (2014), from Infernal Revulsion, Infected Malignity
- Toshiya Watanabe – guitar (2013, 2014), bass (2014), from Angagement
- Masahiro Komuro – guitar (2015), from At One Stroke, Woundeep, Weepray

== Discography ==
Full Lengths

- Screaming For The Truth (1999, Indivisual Records/Sony Music Entertainment)
- 影と光 (Kage To Hikari) (2001, Amuse DCR)
- Rebirth (2005, Vap. Inc)
- Edge Of Spirit (2009, OCH Label/Demons Run Amok)

Demo

- 3-song demo (1997, self-release, cassette)
- Mass Uptight Screaming 4-song demo (1998, self-release, cassette)

Splits

- No Pain, No Gain with Straight Savage Style (1998, self-release, 7")
- Rizla with The Creator Of (2000, Amuse DCR, CD)
- Untitled 7" with Swarrrm (2000, CH Records, 7")
- Real Sights, Realize, Real Lights with Immortality (2004, Vap. Inc, CD)

Compilation appearances

- "Burn Out From The Both End", "Truth" and "The Edge" on Stronger Than Before (1998, Indivisual Records, VHS)
- "Despair" on Radiate (1999, Specialized Fact, CD)
- "Glare" on Brave Brother Bonds (2000, Harvest Records, CD)
- "Vision Of The Lake Bottom" (Terra Rosa cover) on Japanese Heavy Metal Tribute:魂 (2000, Vap, Inc, CD)
- "Screaming For The Truth" on No Limit Fanzine Sampler Vol.2 (2000, No Limit Fanzine, cassette)
- "終わり無き場所" on Defender Of The Faith (2001, Specialized Fact, CD)
- "薄光", "言葉の風" on Change Charge (2001, CH Records, CD)
- "Intro", "呪詛" & "Glare" on Hard Core Pride 3 (2001, BM Production, VHS)
- "Glare" on Enter The Beast Feast (2002, Howling Bull Entertainment, 2CD)
- "P.O.A" (John Holmez cover) on Tribute To John Holmez (2002, Hardcore Kitchen, CD)
- "Creeping Death" (Metallica cover) on Stand Proud! III (2002, Avex Inc, CD)
- "The Edge" on Hard Core Pride 4 (2003, BM Production, VHS)
- "The Edge" on Freestyle Outro'4 (2005, Office Chocolate, DVD)
- "Strength For", "Embrace All Emotion" on ミラーマンREFLEX o.s.t (2006, Vap. Inc, CD)
- "Intro", "Brothersss", "Glare" & "The Edge" on Hard Core Pride 6 (2006, BM Production, DVD)
- "Glare" on Keep on Smiling 2006 (2007, Inclusive Inc, DVD)
- "Glare" on GQC 2006 (2007, High Style Records, DVD)
- "獅子奮迅" (Aggressive Dogs cover) on Aggressive Dogs Tribute Album"真紅" (2009, DefSTAR Records, CD)
- "Brothersss" on Freestyle Outro'5 (2009, OCH Label, DVD)
- "Scenes" on Kirisaki Compilation (2009, Kirisaki Records, CD)
- "Progression and Revolution" on Enter The Rampage (2009, 413Tracks, 3CD)
- "Destroy" on Freestyle Outro'6 (2010, OCH Label, DVD)
- "Destroy" on Hardcore Help Foundation – Benefit Sampler vol.1 (2011, HHF, 2CD)
- "Destroy" on Army Corps of Hell (2011 in Japan/2012 in US and Europe, Square Enix, PS Vita video game)
- "Intro", "Glare", & "The Edge" on Freestyle Outro'8 (2012, Furious Records, DVD)
- "W.A.R." on Unite For Relief – A Hardcore Benefit For Japan (2012, Furious Records/Filled With Hate Records, 2CD)
- "Rebellion" on Hardcore Ball 10 (2013, Straight Up Records, CD)
- "Face it or leave" on Japanese Skin Core (2023, Pitbull Japan, CD)
