= Fushigi (album) =

Studio album by Akina Nakamori
- Released: August 11, 1986
- Recorded: 1986
- Studio: Sedic Audio Studio; Sound Inn Studios; Freedom Studio; Sound Atelier; Cherry Island Studio; Music Inn Studio; Warner-Pioneer Studio
- Genre: New wave
- Length: 45:08
- Language: Japanese
- Label: Warner Pioneer
- Producer: Akina Nakamori

Akina Nakamori chronology
Best (1986)	Fushigi (1986)	Crimson (1986)

Fushigi (不思議; lit. "Mystery" or "Secret"), often translated as Strange or Mysterious, is the ninth studio album by Japanese singer Akina Nakamori, released on August 11, 1986 through Warner Pioneer.

The album was a huge departure from previous genres such as Kayōkyoku or typical styles that were mostly common in her country that were likely to transformed herself as idol to artist, instead it incorporates of various genres like gothic rock, new wave, dream pop, sophisti-pop and also synthpop which was present in her previous albums like Bitter and Sweet and D404ME.

Fushigi earned positive reviews and becoming her most critically acclaimed album in her career, while others are comparing its vocal production to Cocteau Twins due to their similarities.

== Background ==
In February or March 1986 the name of the album was announced, along with an early track list set. Originally, the album was supposed to include the promotional single "Fin" along with its B-side (they were later released in the mini compilation album CD87). Some tracks had names which were later used in other studio albums ("Akai Mystery" in Cruise and "Fire Starter" in Stock). The album track "Fushigi" was later re-recorded in the mini album Wonder.

In May, an inquiry letter was included inside the single "Gypsy Queen", with information about the planned release of the album in early July, however due to production issues, the release was postponed to August.

The final official track list was published in June; from the previous list only three tracks remained: "Okibi", "Glass no Kokoro", "Marionette" and "Teenage Blue". In 1988, these four tracks were re-recorded and included in the mini album Wonder with clearer vocals and a change in arrangements. It is unknown whether the demo-tape tracks "Aoi Twilight Rain" and "Akage no Sandora", which were included in the earlier track set list, were renamed or completely removed from the album.

The album is the first self-produced by Nakamori. It is something of a concept album in that every track features vocals with heavy reverb or other effects (many unsuspecting members of the Japanese public at first thought this to be an unintentional mis-recording).

== Stage performance ==
Before the album release, Nakamori performed "Back Door Night" and "Marionette" as a medley in the music television program Yoru no Hit Studio, on 24 July 1986. In 1986 in the live tour Light and Shade, she performed "Back Door Night", "Marionette", "Genwaku Sarete", "Glass no Kokoro" and "New Generation". In 1987 in the live tour A Hundred Days, she performed "Wait for me" and "Mushroom Dance". In 2004 on the live tour I hope so, she performed "Okibi" and "Marionette".

== Chart performance ==
Despite using unique vocal techniques in a foreign way to her fan base, the album proved to sell moderately well, debuting at number 1 on Oricon Albums Chart and charting in the same position for three consecutive weeks. The album remained at number 16 on the Oricon Album Yearly Charts in 1987.

== Track listing ==
All tracks produced by Akina Nakamori.

No.	Title	Lyrics	Music	Arrangement	Length
1.	"Back Door Night"	Keiko Aso	Eurox	Eurox	5:33
2.	"New Generation"	Ichiko Takehana	Eurox	Eurox	3:59
3.	"Labyrinth"	Aso	Eurox	Eurox	4:50
4.	"Marionette"	Takaaki Yasuoka	Yasuoka	Eurox	4:21
5.	"Genwaku Sarete"	Minako Yoshida	Eurox	Eurox	4:11
6.	"Glass no Kokoro"	Sandii	Makoto Kubota	Akira Inoue	4:24
7.	"Teen-age Blue"	Yoshida	Yoshida	Kazuo Shiina	4:14
8.	"Okibi"	Yoshida	Yoshida	Yoshida; Shiina	4:08
9.	"Wait for Me"	Show	Eurox	Eurox	4:55
10.	"Mushroom Dance"	Sandii	Keni Inoue; Kubota	Eurox	4:33
Total length:					45:08

Notes:

- "Back Door Night," "Teen-age Blue" "Wait for Me" and "Mushroom Dance" are stylised in sentence case.

== Alternative recordings by Eurox ==
In 1987, the main sound producer of the album, Eurox, self-covered their songs "Please Wait for me" (Wait for me), "Adulation" (New Generation) and "Dream of" (Back Door Night) in their only album Megatrend with a renewed arrangement and altered lyrics.

== Release history ==
Year	Format(s)	Serial number	Label(s)	Ref.
1986	LP, CT, CD	L-12595, LKF-8095, 32XL-155	Warner Pioneer	
1991	CD	WPCL-420	Warner Pioneer	
1996	CD	WPC6-8190	Warner Pioneer	
2006	CD, digital download	WPCL-10286	Warner Pioneer	
2012	Super Audio CD, CD hybrid	WPCL-11144	Warner Pioneer	
2014	CD	WPCL-11730	Warner Pioneer	
2018	LP	WPJL-10093	Warner Pioneer	
2023	2CD	WPCL-13474/5	Warner Pioneer	

Notes:

- 2006 re-release includes 24-bit digitally remastered sound source
- 2012 and 2014 re-release includes subtitles in the tracks "2012 remaster"
- 2023 re-release includes lacquer remaster which includes subtitles in the tracks "2023 lacquer remaster" along with original karaoke version of the tracks

== See also ==
- 1986 in Japanese music
