= Shigetaka Kashiwagi's Top Water Bassing =

1995 video game

- Developer(s): Imagesoft
- Publisher(s): VAP / Zeal
- Composer(s): Hiroaki Hontani
- Platform(s): Super Famicom
- Release: JP: February 17, 1995
- Genre(s): Fishing
- Mode(s): Single-player

Shigetaka Kashiwagi's Top Water Bassing (柏木重孝のＴＯＰ ＷＡＴＥＲ ＢＡＳＳＩＮＧ) is a Japan-exclusive Super Famicom fishing video game endorsed by the Japanese professional bass fisher Shigetaka Kashiwagi.

== Summary ==
The object is to fish in a fictional lake in Japan and find as much black bass as possible and with as much weight as possible. Players must cast their fishing lures in the water in order to catch the fish swimming in the digitized body of water. Certain areas of the lake can be chosen and weather can also be a factor. When actually fishing, the player's virtual avatar can be seen casting a lure into the water. The fishing in the game is done from the morning hours to mid-afternoon. There are a variety of lures to choose from including sinkers and bobbers.

== Reception ==
On release, Famitsu magazine scored the game a 22 out of 40.
