= Ganso Saiyūki: Super Monkey Daibōken =

1986 video game

- Cover art
- Developer: Techno Quest
- Publisher: VAP
- Designers: Tsutomu Takase; Kaoru Nakajima
- Programmer: O-san
- Platform: Family Computer
- Release: JP: November 21, 1986
- Genre: Action Adventure
- Mode: Single-player

Ganso Saiyūki: Super Monkey Daibōken (元祖西遊記 スーパーモンキー大冒険) is an action video game for the Family Computer which was released exclusively in Japan on November 21, 1986. The game is based on the novel Journey to the West.

== Gameplay ==
Sun must fight a crocodile-like enemy in order to progress in this level.

Sun Wukong must assist the Buddhist monk Xuanzang with his task of collecting some sūtras as they make the treacherous voyage from China to India. Other guardians can be asked to join the adventuring party after meeting up with them. Most of the storyline in this video game is based on the Chinese novel Journey to the West. Players can enter a code that allows them to return to any stage at any time; similar to a password system.

It is possible to die of starvation and/or hunger without the proper food/drink items. A meter for water and food are automatically deducted for every move that is made while travelling from landmark to landmark. These food and drink items are found inside people's houses for consumption. Houses appears as buildings representing pagodas. Certain landmarks must be entered in order to progress the game's storyline; these are represented in-game as a grey square with a drawbridge-like structure. An onslaught of enemies must be defeated in the side-scrolling segments of the game.

This video game was featured in the Japanese TV show Game Center CX. It was declared to be one of the hardest (and least comprehensible) video games in the history of Japanese video games. It is often considered a kusoge.

== Hidden message ==
An explicit message is hidden within the game's tileset, not accessible during gameplay, containing a developer's personal sexual information.
