= Otoko no Ko Onna no Ko =

Studio album by Kyōko Koizumi
- Released: November 21, 1996
- Genre: Japanese pop
- Label: Victor Entertainment

Kyōko Koizumi chronology
TRAVEL ROCK (1994)	Otoko no Ko Onna no Ko (1996)	KYO→ (1998)

Otoko no ko Onna no ko (オトコのコ オンナのコ) is the twenty-first album by Japanese singer Kyōko Koizumi. Composed and arranged by Yoko Kanno, it was released in 1996. The namesake titular song was first released as a single, which was later included on this album.

== Track listing ==
1. "Akai Kingyo" (赤い金魚)
  - Red Goldfish
2. "SABOTEN" (サボテン)
  - Cactus
3. "Dream Recorder"
4. "For My Life"
5. "Heya ni Kaerou ～When I die" (部屋に帰ろう ～When I die)
  - Let's Return to the Room ～When I die
6. "Otoko no Ko Onna no Ko (Chotto Oishii Edit)" (オトコのコ オンナのコ （ちょっとオイシイ Edit）)
  - Boys Girls (Somewhat Delicious Edit)
7. "Pomade" (ポマード, Pomādo)
8. "Kowareta GITAA (壊れたギター, Kowareta Gitā)"
  - Broken Guitar
9. "Interview" (インタビュー, Intabyū)
10. "Boku no Heya no Mado" (僕の部屋の窓)
  - The Window in My Room
11. "Daiji na Kimochi" (大事な気持ち)
  - Important Feelings
12. "Fukai Midori no BERUBETTO" (深い緑のベルベット)
  - Deep Green Velvet

== Personnel ==
- Kyōko Koizumi - Vocals, lyrics (all tracks except 7 which is an instrumental track)
- Yoko Kanno - Composer, arrangement
- Kaori Moriwaka - Composer (Track 2 only)
- Tamio Okuda - Composer (Track 6 only)
- Tataku Kamoshi - Composer (Track 8 only)
- Ryuunu Hokujo - Composer (Track 8 only)
- SAMPLY RED - Composer (Track 9 only)
