= Splash (Satomi Fukunaga album) =

Studio album by Satomi Fukunaga
- Released: November 14, 1986
- Genre: Pop
- Language: Japanese
- Label: Canyon Records

Satomi Fukunaga chronology
Splash (1986)	Sambo (1987)

Singles from Splash
- 1. "Kaze no Invitation" Released: May 21, 1986; 2. "Heart no Ignition" Released: October 1, 1986

Splash (stylized as SPLASH) is the first studio album by Japanese singer Satomi Fukunaga. It was released on November 14, 1986 through Canyon Records.

== Charts ==
The album reached number 8 on the Cash Box Japanese LPs chart published on 13 December 1986, but no chart was published the following week.

== Track listing ==
All tracks arranged by Masaaki Ōmura except track 2 arranged by Jun Satō and tracks 3 & 9 arranged by Hitoshi Minowa.

No.	Title	Lyrics	Music	Length
1.	"Sweet Revolution"	Norie Kanzawa	Kōji Ikeda
2.	"Kaze no Invitation (New Remix)" (風のInvitation (NEW REMIX))	Yasushi Akimoto	Ken Takahashi
3.	"Mis-Call"	Ikki Matsumoto	Hitoshi Minowa
4.	"Jasmine no Tsumujikaze" (ジャスミンのつむじ風)	Kanzawa	Yasuhiro Abe
5.	"Lodge no Kenka wa I Love You" (ロッジの喧嘩はI Love You)	Keiko Asō	Takamune Negishi
6.	"Sometimes Somewhere"	Kanzawa	Takahashi
7.	"Stardust Serenade"	Asō	Masaaki Ōmura
8.	"10gatsu wa Sayonara no Palm Tree" (10月はさよならのパームツリー)	Asō	Tetsuya Komuro
9.	"3dome no No Try" (3度目のNO TRY)	Seikō Itō	Hitoshi Minowa
10.	"Heart no Ignition (New Remix)" (ハートのIgnition (NEW REMIX))	Akimoto	Ginji Itō
11.	"Hoshi no Puzzler ~Eien o Shinjite~" (星のPuzzler ～永遠を信じて～)	Asō	Kenjirō Sakiya

== Personnel ==
- Norio Sakai – bass
- Kenji Takamizu – bass
- Chiharu Mikuzuki – bass
- Eiji Shimamura – drums
- Shōji Fujii – drums
- Hideo Yamaki – drums
- Haruo Kubota – guitar
- Tsuyoshi Kon – guitar
- Takeshi Nishiyama – guitar
- Masaki Matsubara – guitar
- Masaaki Ōmura – keyboard
- Nobuo Kurata – keyboard
- Jun Satō – keyboard
- Haruo Togashi – keyboard
- Akira Nishimoto – keyboard
- Hitoshi Minowa – keyboard
- Nobu Saitō – percussion
- Hitoshi Anbai – programming
- Keiji Urata – programming
- Hideki Matsutake – programming
- Jake H. Conception – sax
- Katō Strings – strings
- Yasuhiro Kido – backing vocals
- BUZZ – backing vocals
- Kiyoshi Hiyama – backing vocals
- Etsuko Yamakawa – backing vocals

== Singles ==
=== Kaze No Invitation ===
The single Kaze No Invitation (風のインビテーション) reached number 1 on the Oricon Singles Chart and the Music Labo singles chart.

=== Heart No Ignition ===
The single Heart No Ignition (ハートのIgnition) reached number 2 on the Oricon Singles Chart. and the Music Labo singles chart. It also appeared on the Cash Box singles chart.

== See also ==
- 1986 in Japanese music
