= Masahito Arai =

Japanese singer

Masahito Arai 新井 正人
- Born: March 25, 1958 (age 67); Matsudo, Chiba Prefecture, Japan
- Genres: Album-oriented rock; city pop
- Years active: 1977–present
- Formerly of: Brand New Omega Tribe
- Website: files-m-music.sakura.ne.jp/arai/TOP.html

Japanese name
- Kanji: 新井 正人
- Hiragana: あらい まさひと
- Katakana: アライ マサヒト
Transcriptions
- Romanization: Arai Masahiro

Masahito Arai (新井 正人, Arai Masahito) is a Japanese singer and composer. Debuting with the band Diary in 1977, he joined the group Pal in 1979 and had a solo debut in 1987, performing the song "Anime ja Nai" for the 1986 anime Mobile Suit Gundam ZZ.

== Life and career ==
Arai was born on March 25, 1958, in Matsudo, Chiba Prefecture, Japan. He was influenced by his parents, who both liked various kinds of music such as bossa nova, pop music, and traditional Japanese music; his grandfather played the shamisen. He started playing the guitar during elementary school and started composing music in the first grade of junior high school. While doing band activities in 1976, he was scouting and made his debut as a professional shortly after graduating from Nihon University First High School.

== Career ==
In 1977, Arai made his professional debut as the vocalist of the group Diary, leaving in 1979 to join the band Pal as their second lead vocalist. In 1986, he was approached to create an anime song for his debut solo career, with him debuting with the song "Anime ja Nai" for the anime Mobile Suit Gundam ZZ. In 1993, Omega Tribe producer Koichi Fujita made him the vocalist for the project's final iteration, Brand New Omega Tribe, which lasted until 1994. After that, he continued his musical career, including providing songs for Kiyoshi Maekawa.

In 2015, he formed the band ST4 with Isao Taira and MIQ, holding shows in various places including nursing homes. In 2017, he became a part-time lecturer at the Senzoku Gakuen College of Music.

== Discography ==
=== Studio albums ===
List of studio albums with chart positions
Title	Album details
Masahito Arai	Released: October 21, 1987; Label: Humming Bird; Format: LP, CD, cassette
Fuzzy	Released: September 21, 1988; Label: Humming Bird; Format: LP, CD, cassette
Necessary	Released: May 21, 1989; Label: Humming Bird; Format: LP, CD, cassette

=== Singles ===
List of singles showing year released and album name
Title	Year	Album
"Anime ja Nai"	1986	Non-album single
"Kimi wa Ima…"	1987	Masahito Arai
"His"	1988	Non-album single
"Suteki ni Teisuti"	1988	Fuzzy
"Lonely Girl"	1989	Necessary
"12-Ji-sugi no Shinderera"	1989	Necessary
"Naito Mirāju"	1989	Non-album single
