= Raspberry Wind =

Studio album by Yōko Oginome
- Released: April 21, 1986
- Recorded: 1986
- Genres: J-pop; dance-pop; teen pop; city pop
- Length: 40:41 (LP/cassette); 44:26 (CD)
- Languages: Japanese; English
- Label: Victor

Yōko Oginome chronology
Yōko Oginome: The Best (1985)	Raspberry Wind (1986)	Heartbeat Express: Sōshun Monogatari Memorial Album (1986)

Singles from Raspberry Wind
- 1. "Flamingo in Paradise" Released: March 26, 1986

Raspberry Wind (ラズベリーの風, Rasuberī no Kaze) is the fourth studio album by Japanese singer Yōko Oginome. Released through Victor Entertainment on April 21, 1986, the album marked Oginome's transition from idol-based kayōkyoku to dance-pop and city pop, following the success of her 1985 single "Dancing Hero (Eat You Up)". It includes the hit single "Flamingo in Paradise", as well as the Bari Bari Densetsu theme song "Slope ni Tenki Ame". The CD release includes the English version of "Dancing Hero" as an exclusive track. It was reissued on March 24, 2010 with five bonus tracks as part of Oginome's 25th anniversary celebration.

The album peaked at No. 4 on Oricon's albums chart and sold over 109,000 copies.

== Track listing ==
CD
No.	Title	Lyrics	Music	Arrangement	Length
1.	"Namida wa Speed Yurasukara" (Namida wa Supīdo Yurasukara (涙はスピード揺らすから; "Because Tears Shake Speed"))	Keiko Asō	Yoshiyuki Ohsawa	Motoki Funayama	4:02
2.	"Flamingo in Paradise (Album Version)" (Furamingo in Paradaisu (Arubamu Bājon) (フラミンゴ in パラダイス（アルバム・バージョン）))	Masao Urino	Nobody	Funayama	3:57
3.	"1-2-3, Let Me Dance" (Wan Tsū Surī, Retto Mī Dansu (1・2・3, レット・ミー・ダンス))	Fumiko Okada	Masamichi Sugi	Nobuyuki Shimizu	3:43
4.	"Tasogare no Neighborhood" (Tasogare no Neibāfūdo (黄昏のネイバーフッド; "Twilight Neighborhood"))	Masumi Kawamura	Kiyonori Matsuo	Ryōmei Shirai	3:22
5.	"Slope ni Tenki Ame" (Surōpu ni Tenki Ame (スロープに天気雨; "Rainy Weather on the Slope"))	Asō	Masayoshi Takanaka	Takanaka	4:23
6.	"Dancing Hero (Eat You Up) -Special English Version-" (Danshingu Hīrō (Īto Yū Appu) (ダンシング・ヒーロー (Eat You Up) -Special English Version-))	Marco Bruno	Angeline Kyte; Anthony Baker	Kōji Makaino	3:45
7.	"Lazy Dance"	Kawamura	Toshinobu Kubota	Shimizu	4:32
8.	"Beach Boys wo Tomenai de" (Bīchi Bōizu wo Tomenai de (ビーチボーイズを止めないで; "Don't Stop the Beach Boys"))	Urino	Tetsuji Hayashi	Funayama	3:51
9.	"Namida Shika Mienai" ((涙しか見えない; "I Can Only See Tears"))	Reiko Yukawa	Hayashi	Masaaki Ōmura	4:21
10.	"Mayonaka no Stranger" (Mayonaka no Sutorenjā (真夜中のストレンジャー; "Midnight Stranger"))	Yukawa	Nobody	Hiroshi Shinkawa	3:51
11.	"Natsu no Stage Light" (Natsu no Sutēji Raito (夏のステージ・ライト; "Summer Stage Lights"))	Yukawa	Ōsawa	Shinkawa	4:39
Total length:					44:26

- Track 6 not included in the LP and cassette releases.

2010 bonus tracks
No.	Title	Lyrics	Music	Arrangement	Length
12.	"Dancing Hero (Eat You Up)" (Danshingu Hīrō (Īto Yū Appu) (ダンシング・ヒーロー (Eat You Up)))	Hitoshi Shinohara	Kyte; Baker	Makaino	3:49
13.	"Zenmaijikake no Suiyōbi" ((ぜんまいじかけの水曜日; "Mainspring Wednesday"))	Yasushi Akimoto	Kazuhiko Matsuo	Mitsuo Hagita	4:10
14.	"Flamingo in Paradise (Single Version)" (Furamingo in Paradaisu (Shinguru Bājon) (フラミンゴ in パラダイス（シングル・バージョン）))	Urino	Nobody	Funayama	3:55
15.	"Dancing Hero (Eat You Up) -'70 Mirror Ball Mix-" ((ダンシング・ヒーロー (Eat You Up) -'70 mirror ball mix-))	Shinohara	Kyte; Baker	Makaino; Paradise Groove Productions	5:08
16.	"Flamingo in Paradise -What's 'Paradise' Mix-" ((フラミンゴ in パラダイス -what's "PARADISE" mix-))	Urino	Nobody	Funayama; Paradise Groove Productions	5:23
Total length:					22:27

== Charts ==
Chart (1986)	Peak position
Japanese Albums (Oricon)	4

== See also ==
- 1986 in Japanese music
