= Satomi Fukunaga =

Japanese singer (born 1967)

- Born: Satomi Fukunaga (福永恵規); January 26, 1967 (age 59); Tokyo, Japan
- Genre: J-pop
- Occupation: Singer
- Years active: 1985–1988
- Label: Pony Canyon

Satomi Fukunaga (福永恵規, Fukunaga Satomi, born January 26, 1967, in Tokyo, Japan), is a former Japanese idol and singer. She was among the 11 original members of Onyanko Club.

== Biography ==
When Fukunaga was a child, her parents often took her on walks in the mountains around Tokyo. After enrolling at Meguro Gakuen Girls' Commercial High School (目黒学園女子商業高校), she became involved in surfing frequently. Just before graduating from high school, she appeared on the Bishōjo contest for All Night Fuji High School Girl Special, which aired twice on Fuji TV in February and March 1985. However, it was not her but Sayuri Kokushō who was selected as the grand prix winner. She had already been offered a job at a computer-related company. However, the program's officials, attracted by her good personality, persuaded her to become a member of Onyanko Club. She had dreamed of becoming an actress since childhood, as her younger brother was in a theater company and she liked actress Etsuko Shihomi. As a result, she chose to join the group instead of working for the company. It also led to her being assigned to the entertainment agency Bond Planning (ボンド企画).

She made regular appearances on Yūyake Nyan Nyan("Sunset Meow Meow") (夕やけニャンニャン), a TV program featuring Onyanko Club that was launched on April 1, 1985. At the time, she was said to have a facial resemblance to popular idol Kyōko Koizumi. She was selected as one of the lead vocalists for Onyanko Club's debut song, "Sailor Fuku o Nugasanai de" ("Don't Make Me Take Off My Sailor Suit") (セーラー服を脱がさないで, Sērāfuku o Nugasanai de), released in July 1985. Thereafter, as one of the core members, she was deeply involved in Onyanko Club's songs, as well as starring in idol dramas such as My fiancée (僕の婚約者, Boku no Konyakusha), Could she possibly be a fiancée!? (もしかして婚約者!?, Moshikashite Konyakusha!?), and Sudden fiancée!? (いきなり婚約者!?, Ikinari Konyakusha!?) along with Kazuko Utsumi(内海和子, Utsumi Kazuko). Moreover, she played the sole starring role in the drama Dangerous Extracurricular Lessons (危ない課外授業, Abunai kagaijyugyō).

In May 1986, she made her solo debut with Kaze no Invitation (風のInvitation), which reached number one on the Oricon chart in its first appearance. In September 1986, she graduated from Onyanko Club along with popular members such as Eri Nitta and Akie Yoshizawa. Kazuji Kasai, the chief director of Yūyake Nyan Nyan, described her as faint-hearted. The general public also considered Onyanko Club to be led by the strong-minded Sayuri Kokushō, who was good friends with her. In reality, however, she was the leader of the group, and Kokushō was the deputy leader along with Kazuko Utsumi.

In October 1986, she started appearing in the TV series Sukeban Deka III as Leia (礼亜, Reia), a reference to the Princess Leia character in Star Wars. She previously made a guest appearance in Sukeban Deka II by playing a member of Onyanko Club. Her song, Heart no Ignition (ハートのIgnition), was selected as the theme song for the drama. In addition, her radio program, "Heart no Ignition" was also started on Nippon Broadcasting System. In January 1987, she released Bokutachi no Runaway (僕達のRUNAWAY). in April 1987, she released Kokoro mo Jump shite Natsu no Intro (心もJUMPして! 夏のイントロ), the theme song for the cult anime show Project A-ko 2. In September 1988, Just before the Seoul Olympics commenced, she published a guidebook on South Korea titled A book to read on the plane to Seoul (ソウルへ行く飛行機の中で読む本, Sourueyuku Hikōkinonakade Yomuhon). In November 1988, She retired from the entertainment industry, citing health reasons.

She then became an office worker and married in 1994. Entering the 2010s, she became a director of the entertainment agency Office Nisshin (オフィス日新).

== Discography ==
=== Singles ===
Year	Title	Details	Peak chart position (Oricon)
1986	"Kaze no Invitation" (風のInvitation)	Release date: May 21, 1986; B-side: "Nagisa no U-turn" (渚のUターン)	#1
1986	"Heart no Ignition" (ハートのIgnition)	Release date: October 1, 1986; Theme song for Sukeban Deka III; B-side: "Ame no Bara" (雨のバラ)	#2
1987	"Boku-tachi no RUNAWAY" (僕達のRUNAWAY)	Release date: January 28, 1987; B-side: "March"	#2
1987	"Kokoro mo JUMP Shite! Natsu no Intro" (心もJUMPして! 夏のイントロ)	Release date: April 24, 1987; Theme song for Project A-ko 2; B-side: "Hoshi no ROMANCE" (星のROMANCE)	#14

=== Albums ===
==== Studio albums ====
- Splash (1986)
- Sambo (1987)

==== Compilation albums ====
- Fukunaga Satomi Best (福永恵規 ベスト) (1987)
- My Kore! (Myこれ!) series
  - My Kore! Ction: Fukunaga Satomi BEST (Myこれ!クション 福永恵規BEST) (2002)
  - My Kore! Lite: Fukunaga Satomi (Myこれ!Lite 福永恵規) (2010)

== Sources ==
- Iwakiri, Jun, ed. (August 24, 1987). おニャン子白書 [The White Paper On Onyanko Club] (in Japanese). Tokyo, Japan: Fusosha Publishing. ISBN 4-594-00169-6.
- Ino, Ryōsuke, ed. (November 18, 2003). おニャン子クラブと永遠のグループアイドル [Onyanko Club And Eternal Group Idols] (in Japanese). Tokyo, Japan: Takarajimasha. ISBN 978-4796636919.
