= List of Oricon number-one singles of 1984 =

The highest-selling singles in Japan are ranked in the Oricon Singles Chart, which in 1984 was published in what was then called Oricon Weekly magazine. The data are compiled by Oricon based on each singles' physical sales. This list includes the singles that reached the number one place on that chart in 1984.

== Oricon Weekly Singles Chart ==
Issue date	Song	Artist(s)	Ref.
January 2	"Moshimo Ashita ga..."	Warabe	
January 9	"Moshimo Ashita ga..."	Warabe	
January 16	"Moshimo Ashita ga..."	Warabe	
January 23	"Moshimo Ashita ga..."	Warabe	
January 30	"Moshimo Ashita ga..."	Warabe	
February 6	"Moshimo Ashita ga..."	Warabe	
February 13	"Rock'n Rouge"	Seiko Matsuda	
February 20	"Rock'n Rouge"	Seiko Matsuda	
February 27	"Rock'n Rouge"	Seiko Matsuda	
March 5	"Rock'n Rouge"	Seiko Matsuda	
March 12	"Ichiban Yarō"	Masahiko Kondō	
March 19	"Wine Red no Kokoro"	Anzen Chitai	
March 26	"Wine Red no Kokoro"	Anzen Chitai	
April 2	"Nagisa no Haikara Ningyo / Kaze no Magical"	Kyōko Koizumi	
April 9	"Katsu!"	Shibugakitai	
April 16	"Katsu!"	Shibugakitai	
April 23	"Southern Wind"	Akina Nakamori	
April 30	"Southern Wind"	Akina Nakamori	
May 7	"Southern Wind"	Akina Nakamori	
May 14	"Kanashikute Jealousy"	The Checkers	
May 21	"Jikan no Kuni no Alice / Natsu Fuku no Eve"	Seiko Matsuda	
May 28	"Jikan no Kuni no Alice / Natsu Fuku no Eve"	Seiko Matsuda	
June 4	"Kishidō"	Toshihiko Tahara	
June 11	"Kishidō"	Toshihiko Tahara	
June 18	"Kejime Nasai"	Masahiko Kondō	
June 25	"Kejime Nasai"	Masahiko Kondō	
July 2	"Meikyū no Andorōra / Dunk"	Kyōko Koizumi	
July 9	"Meikyū no Andorōra / Dunk"	Kyōko Koizumi	
July 16	"Amaoto wa Chopin no Shirabe"	Asami Kobayashi	
July 23	"Amaoto wa Chopin no Shirabe"	Asami Kobayashi	
July 30	"Amaoto wa Chopin no Shirabe"	Asami Kobayashi	
August 6	"Jukkai (1984)"	Akina Nakamori	
August 13	"Pink no Mozart"	Seiko Matsuda	
August 20	"Ao ni Kaita Ren'ai Shōsetsu"	Toshihiko Tahara	
August 27	"Jukkai (1984)"	Akina Nakamori	
September 3	"Hoshikuzu no Stage"	The Checkers	
September 10	"Hoshikuzu no Stage"	The Checkers	
September 17	"Hoshikuzu no Stage"	The Checkers	
September 24	"Eien ni Himitsu sa" (永遠に秘密さ)	Masahiko Kondō	
October 1	"Yamato Nadeshiko Shichi Henge"	Kyōko Koizumi	
October 8	"Yamato Nadeshiko Shichi Henge"	Kyōko Koizumi	
October 15	"Yamato Nadeshiko Shichi Henge"	Kyōko Koizumi	
October 22	"Tengoku ni Ichiban Chikai Shima"	Tomoyo Harada	
October 29	"Koibito-tachi no Pavement"	The Alfee	
November 5	"Woman "W no Higeki" Yori"	Hiroko Yakushimaru	
November 12	"Heart no Earring"	Seiko Matsuda	
November 19	"Heart no Earring"	Seiko Matsuda	
November 26	"Kazari ja Nai no yo Namida wa"	Akina Nakamori	
December 3	"Julia ni Shōshin"	The Checkers	
December 10	"Julia ni Shōshin"	The Checkers	
December 17	"Julia ni Shōshin"	The Checkers	
December 24	"Julia ni Shōshin"	The Checkers	
December 31	"The Stardust Memory"	Kyōko Koizumi	

== See also ==
- 1984 in Japanese music
