= Roppongi Junjōha =

1986 single by Yōko Oginome

Single by Yōko Oginome

from the album Non-Stopper: Yōko Oginome "The Beat" Special
- Language: Japanese
- English title: Roppongi Pure-Heart Clique
- B-side: "Romantic Odyssey"
- Released: October 29, 1986
- Recorded: 1986
- Genre: J-pop; dance-pop
- Length: 3:29
- Label: Victor
- Songwriters: Masao Urino; Akihiro Yoshimi

Yōko Oginome singles chronology
"Dance Beat wa Yoake made" (1986)	"Roppongi Junjōha" (1986)	"Wangan Taiyōzoku" (1987)

Music video
- "Roppongi Junjōha" on YouTube

"Roppongi Junjōha" (六本木純情派; lit. "Roppongi Pure-Heart Clique") is the tenth single by Japanese singer Yōko Oginome. Written by Masao Urino and Akihiro Yoshimi, the single was released on October 29, 1986 by Victor Entertainment.

== Background and release ==
"Roppongi Junjōha" peaked at No. 3 on Oricon's singles chart, making it Oginome's highest-charting single until "Sayonara no Kajitsutachi" hit No. 1 in 1987. It also sold over 261,000 copies. The song earned Oginome the Gold Award at the 29th Japan Record Awards, the Best Hit Song Award at the 1987 FNS Music Festival, and the Wired Music Award at the 20th Japan Cable Awards. Oginome performed the song on the 38th Kōhaku Uta Gassen in 1986, making her second appearance on NHK's New Year's Eve special. In addition to Oginome's achievements for the song, songwriter Akihiro Yoshimi won the Outstanding Composer Award for this song at the 20th Japan Composition Awards.

The B-side, "Romantic Odyssey", was used as the theme song of the Famicom game Ginga Denshō (銀河伝承; Galaxy Odyssey).

Oginome re-recorded the song in her 2014 cover album Dear Pop Singer.

== Track listing ==
1986 single
No.	Title	Lyrics	Music	Arrangement	Length
1.	"Roppongi Junjōha" ((六本木純情派; "Roppongi Pure-Heart Clique"))	Masao Urino	Akihiro Yoshimi	Hiroshi Shinkawa	3:29
2.	"Romantic Odyssey" (Romantikku Odessei (ロマンティック・オデッセイ))	Hiromi Mori	Ginji Itō	Itō	4:09

2013 bonus tracks
No.	Title	Length
3.	"Roppongi Junjōha (Original Karaoke)" ((六本木純情派 (オリジナル・カラオケ); "Roppongi Pure-Heart Clique (Original Karaoke)"))
4.	"Romantic Odyssey (Original Karaoke)" ((ロマンティック・オデッセイ (オリジナル・カラオケ)))

== Charts ==
Weekly charts

Chart (1986)	Peak position
Oricon Weekly Singles Chart	3
The Best Ten	2
Uta no Top Ten	2

Year-end charts

Chart (1987)	Peak position
Oricon Year-End Chart	36
The Best Ten Year-End Chart	54

== Cover versions ==
- Priscilla Chan covered the song in Cantonese as "Tān, tān, tān" (貪、貪、貪, lit. "Greed, Greed, Greed") on her 1987 album Biàn biàn biàn (變變變, lit. Change, Change, Change).
- The Nolans covered the song in English as "Roppongi Street" on their 1991 album Tidal Wave (Samishii Nettaigyo).
- Ms. Ooja covered the song on her 2022 cover album Nagashi no Ooja 2: Vintage Song Covers.

== See also ==
- 1986 in Japanese music
