= 100% Danjo Kōsai =

Single by Kyoko Koizumi

from the album Liar
- English title: 100% Male-Female Relationship
- B-side: "Jiyū na taiyō"
- Released: April 30, 1986
- Genre: J-pop
- Length: 3:52
- Label: Victor Entertainment
- Composer: Kōji Makaino
- Lyricist: Keiko Aso

100% Danjo Kōsai (100%男女交際; 100% Man and Woman Relationship) is the eighteenth single by Kyoko Koizumi. It was released by Victor Entertainment on April 30, 1986.

The Single peaked at No. 2 on the Oricon weekly singles chart.

== Background ==
Following the hit success of her November 1985 single Nante Datte Idol, which hit No. 1 on the Oricon charts, Kyoko Koizumi's management were unsure of where to go from there. The single was initially supposed to be released on March 21, 1986, under the title Akarui Danjo Kōsai, in reference to the "Bright National" phrase that was broadcast in a commercial for a now Panasonic-owned company called National, however this was not realised, and the date for the single release was pushed back to April and the album (which would later be devised as "Liar") postponed. On an interview for All Night Nippon, Kyoko Koizumi revealed she preferred the initial title of "Akarui Danjo Kōsai".

Etsuko Yamakawa was in charge of arranging the single. She stated that the song took much longer to complete than any other single, as the direction for the single's sound was constantly changing. She also recalls that she worked on the arrangement because she wanted to give the song a stylish feel for a flashy song. The single was completed and released in its final form as "100% Danjo Kōsai" on April 30, 1986. In December 1986, Etsuko Yamakawa won the Arrangement Award at the 28th Japan Record Awards for the single, becoming the first woman in arranging to win the award.

== See also ==
- 1986 in Japanese music
