= Heartbeat Express =

Heartbeat Express: Sōshun Monogatari Memorial Album

EP by Yōko Oginome
- Released: August 5, 1986
- Recorded: 1986
- Genre: J-pop; dance-pop; teen pop
- Length: 25:39
- Language: Japanese
- Label: Victor
- Producer: Tamio Komuro

Yōko Oginome chronology
Raspberry Wind (1986)	Heartbeat Express: Sōshun Monogatari Memorial Album (1986)	Non-Stopper: Yōko Oginome "The Beat" Special (1986)

Singles from Heartbeat Express: Sōshun Monogatari Memorial Album
- 1. "Dance Beat wa Yoake made" Released: June 10, 1986

Heartbeat Express: Sōshun Monogatari Memorial Album (ハートビート・エクスプレス ～早春物語メモリアル・アルバム～, Hātobīto Ekusupuresu: Sōshun Monogatari Memoriaru Arubamu; Heartbeat Express: Early Spring Story Memorial Album) is an EP by Japanese singer Yōko Oginome. Released through Victor Entertainment on August 5, 1986, the EP served as the soundtrack to the TBS drama series Sōshun Monogatari: Watashi, Otona ni Narimasu (早春物語〜私、大人になります〜; Early Spring Story: I Will Be an Adult), which starred Oginome as the lead character Hitomi Okino (沖野 瞳, Okino Hitomi). It was reissued on March 24, 2010 with nine bonus tracks as part of Oginome's 25th anniversary celebration.

The EP peaked at No. 4 on Oricon's albums chart and sold over 42,000 copies.

== Track listing ==
Side A
No.	Title	Lyrics	Music	Arrangement	Length
1.	"Dance Beat wa Yoake made" (Dansu Bīto wa Yoake made (Dance Beatは夜明けまで; "Dance Beat Until Dawn"))	Hiromi Mori	Nobody	Akira Nishihira	3:41
2.	"Pandora no Namida" ((パンドラの涙; "Pandora's Tears"))	Masumi Kawamura	Tetsuya Furumoto	Motoki Funayama	4:03
3.	"Rain -Natsu wo Tsuresaru Ame-" ((rain夏をつれさる雨; "Rain -The Rain That Brings Summer-"))	Mori	Hiroya Watanabe	Watanabe	3:53
Total length:					11:38

Side B
No.	Title	Lyrics	Music	Arrangement	Length
4.	"Velvet no Itazura" (Berubetto no Itazura (ベルベットの悪戯; "Velvet Mischief"))	Kawamura	Watanabe	Watanabe	4:12
5.	"Hito Natsu dake no Tenshi" ((ひと夏だけの天使; "An Angel Only For One Summer"))	Fumiko Okada	Watanabe	Masaaki Ōmura	4:56
6.	"After My Heart Beats" (Afutā Mai Hātobītsu (アフター・マイ・ハートビーツ))	Kawamura	Nobody	Nishihira	4:51
Total length:					14:00

2010 bonus tracks
No.	Title	Lyrics	Music	Arrangement	Length
7.	"Romantic Odyssey" (Romantikku Odessei (ロマンティック・オデッセイ))	Mori	Ginji Itō	Itō	4:12
8.	"Dance Beat wa Yoake made -In Sevilla-" (Dansu Bīto wa Yoake made -In Sebīria (Dance Beatは夜明けまで -in セビーリア-; "Dance Beat Until Dawn -In Sevilla-"))	Mori	Nobody	Nishihira	4:01
9.	"I Love You wo Ienai Mama ni" ((I Love Youを言えないままに; "Without Saying I Love You"))	Mai Arai	Arai	Mitsuo Hagita	5:11
10.	"Skyway wo Mitsumete" (Sukaiuei wo Mitsumete (Skywayを見つめて; "Staring at the Skyway"))	Arai	Arai	Hagita	5:23
11.	"Kegareta Kutsu no Initial" (Kegareta Kutsu no Inisharu (汚れた靴のイニシャル; "Initials of Dirty Shoes"))	Gorō Matsui	Kōji Tamaki	Katz Hoshi; Yutaka Takezawa; Masahiro Kobayashi	4:21
12.	"Omoide ni wa Hayasugiru" ((想い出には早すぎる; "Too Early to Remember"))	Matsui	Tamaki	Hoshi; Wataru Yahagi	3:46
13.	"Main Theme" (Mein Tēma (メインテーマ))	Akira Hayasaka	Shinji Harada	Hideharu Mori	3:51
14.	"Rock My Love"	Yumi Yoshimoto	Kōji Makaino	Makaino	4:33
15.	"More More Shiawase" (Moa Moa Shiawase (MORE MORE しあわせ; "More More Happiness"))	Kawamura	Mark Davis	Inoue Brothers	4:57
Total length:					40:19

== Charts ==
Chart (1986)	Peak position
Japanese Albums (Oricon)	4

== See also ==
- 1986 in Japanese music
