= Wonder (Akina Nakamori album) =

EP by Akina Nakamori
- Released: 1 June 1988
- Recorded: 1988
- Genre: New wave, ethereal wave
- Length: 21:40
- Language: Japanese
- Label: Warner Pioneer
- Producer: Akina Nakamori

Akina Nakamori chronology
Stock (1988)	Wonder (1988)	Femme Fatale (1988)

Wonder is the third mini studio album by Japanese singer Akina Nakamori. It was released on 1 June 1988 under the Warner Pioneer label. The reprinted version was published on 17 September 1991.

== Background ==
Wonder is her last mini album to be released under Warner Pioneer. It's also her first mini album to be released for the first time in four years. The album consists of re-recorded and re-arranged songs from her first self-produced album Fushigi along with previously unreleased track, Fushigi. The original song has been created during the production of album Fushigi, but wasn't included in the 1986 album and instead released on this album.

Nakamori performed her new song, Fushigi in her live tour Femme Fatale in 1988.

== Chart performance ==
The album debuted at number 2 on the Oricon Album Weekly Charts, remained in top 100 chart for 10 weeks and sold over 117,600 copies.

== Track listing ==
No.	Title	Lyrics	Music	Arranger(s)	Length
1.	"Labyrinth"	Keiko Aso	Eurox	Eurox	4:58
2.	"Okibi"	Minako Yoshida	Yoshida	Yoshida, Kazuo Shiina	4:16
3.	"Fushigi"	Yoshida	Yoshida	Akira Inoue	4:34
4.	"Glass no Kokoro"	Sandii	Makoto Kubota	Inoue	4:31
5.	"Marionette"	Takaaki Yasuoka	Yasuoka	Eurox	4:18
6.	"Teen-age blue"	Yoshida	Yoshida	Shiina	4:11

== Release history ==
Year	Format(s)	Serial number	Label(s)	Ref.
1988	CD, Golden CD	28XL-194, 43XL-2001	Warner Pioneer	
1991	CD	WPCL-425	Warner Pioneer	
2023	CD, LP	WPCL-13508, WPJL10185	Warner Pioneer	

Notes:

- 2023 re-release includes lacquer remaster which includes subtitles in the tracks "2022 lacquer remaster" along with original karaoke version of the tracks

== See also ==
- 1988 in Japanese music
