= Akemi Ishii =

Japanese singer (born 1965)

- 石井明美
- Born: 26 August 1965 (age 60); Tateyama, Chiba Prefecture, Japan

Akemi Ishii (Japanese: 石井明美; born 26 August 1965) is a Japanese singer, best known for the song "CHA-CHA-CHA".

== Life and career ==
Born in Tateyama, after graduating from high school, Ishii moved to Tokio, working in a beauty salon in Ginza and in a snack bar in Roppongi, where she was scouted by a talent agent. Put under contract in April 1986, she made her record debut four months later with "CHA-CHA-CHA", a cover of the Italo disco song with the same name by Finzy Contini. The song was chosen as theme song of the TBS drama series Seven Men and Women and became a major success, ranking first on the Oricon Chart and selling over 800,000 copies. The same year, she received the Award for Best New Artist at the Japan Record Awards.

In 1990, Ishii had another major hit with "Lambada", a cover of Los Kjarkas' "Llorando se fue". The same year, she got married and retired. She divorced in 1993, and came back to the music business with "あなたらしくいて", the theme song for Nippon Television series Tuesday Suspense Theater.

== Discography ==
Studio albums

- Mona Lisa (Sony, 1986)
- Joy (Sony, 1987)
- Fanatique (CBS/Sony, 1988)
- 熱帯夜 / Brazilian Night (CBS/Sony, 1990 )
- Colors (Beatsista, 2011)
