= Kyoko Koizumi =

Japanese singer and actress (born 1966)

Kyoko Koizumi 小泉 今日子
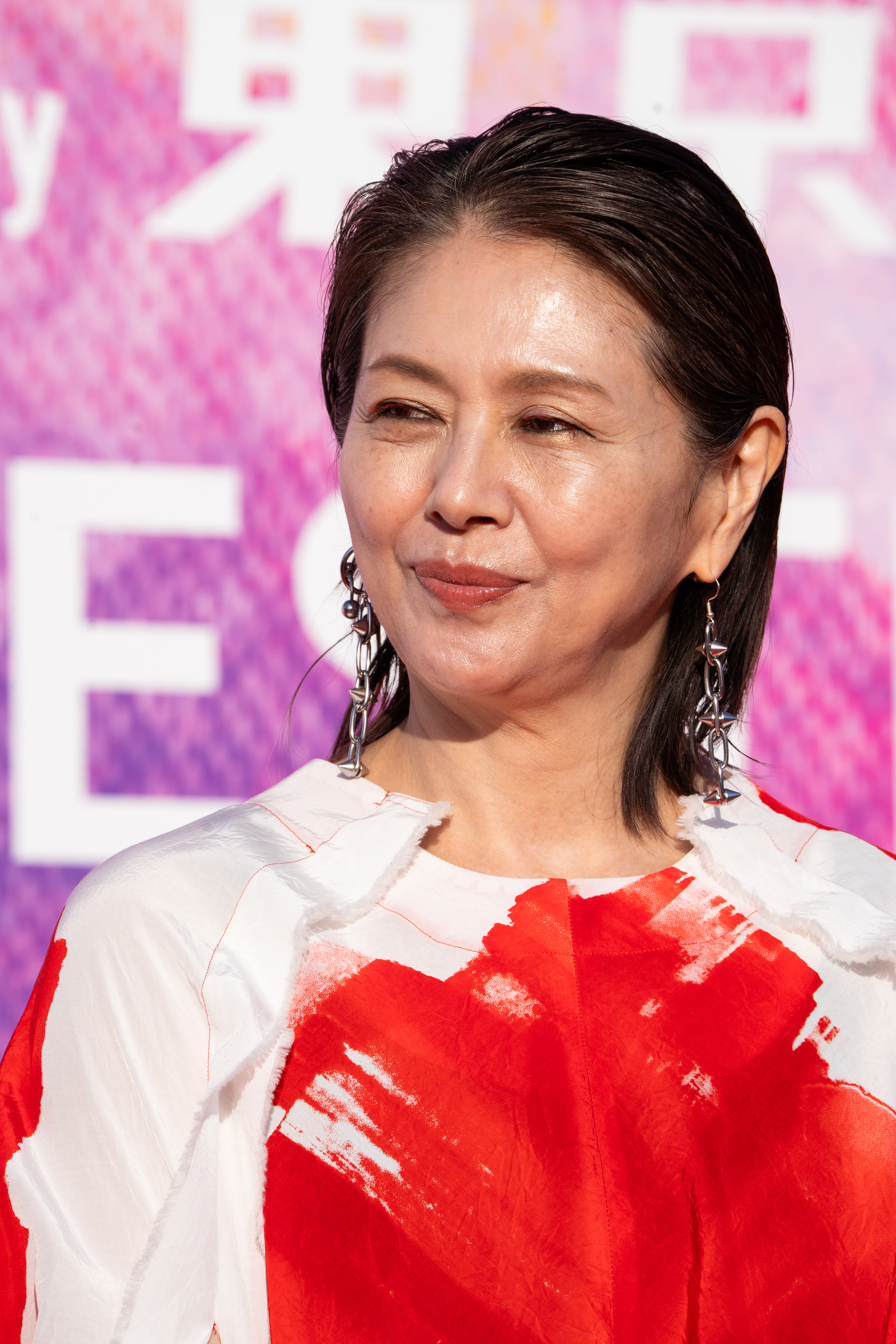
- Koizumi in 2024

Background information
- Also known as: Kyon Kyon
- Born: February 4, 1966 (age 60); Atsugi, Kanagawa, Japan
- Genre: Japanese pop
- Occupations: Singer; actress
- Years active: 1982–present
- Label: Victor Entertainment
- Website: www.koizumix.com

YouTube information
- Channel: 小泉今日子
- Years active: 2021 -
- Subscribers: 53.6 thousand
- Views: 27.6 million
- Last updated: November 23, 2024

Kyoko Koizumi (小泉 今日子, Koizumi Kyōko) (born February 4, 1966) is a Japanese singer and actress. She is signed to Victor Entertainment.

== Career ==
In 1981, Kyoko Koizumi participated in and won the Star Tanjo! programme and released her first single in March 1982. She obtained several number one hits on the Oricon charts in 1984: "Nagisa no Haikara Ningyo / Kaze no Magical", "Yamato Nadeshiko Shichi Henge" and "The Stardust Memory", the latter holding the top spot over the end of 1984 and the beginning of 1985, and thereafter established herself as one of Japan's most popular pop idols, alongside rivals Seiko Matsuda and Akina Nakamori.

Her biggest hit (あなたに会えてよかった) came in 1991, which sold more than a million copies in Japan alone. Koizumi went on to release another single (優しい雨) which also sold over a million copies in 1993.

Koizumi had singles reach the Top Ten for 12 consecutive years between 1983 and 1994, a female solo artist record, until this was broken by Namie Amuro. In the 1990s, she released a few dance remixes on vinyl only under the Koizumix Production moniker. She has worked with Yoko Kanno who composed the music for Koizumi's 1996 album, Otoko no Ko Onna no Ko. She had her first hit single in 18 years when her version of the song "Shiosai no Memorī" from the 2013 NHK morning television drama Amachan, in which Koizumi also acted, reached number 2 on the Oricon Singles Chart. With that, Koizumi made her 6th appearance (as a special guest performer) in the annual Red and White Song Festival, having previously participated from 1984 to 1988.

From mid-90s onward, Koizumi shifted her focus onto acting. As an actress, she played in numerous dramas and movies, most notably, she was cast in two of the most successful movies in Japan ever: as the serial killer in Bayside Shakedown: The Movie (1998) and as the witch in Onmyoji (2001).

She starred in Toshiaki Toyoda's 2006 film Hanging Garden and Kiyoshi Kurosawa's 2008 film Tokyo Sonata. She starred in Kurosawa's 2012 television drama Penance.

Koizumi was given the Best Actress award at the 1989 Yokohama Film Festival for her work in the film Kaito Ruby. She won the award for best actress at the 26th Hochi Film Awards for Kaza Hana. She also won the award for Best Actress at the 66th Mainichi Film Awards for Mainichi Kaasan.

She featured in the French-Japanese film, Umami, directed by Slony Sow and starring Gérard Depardieu, which was filmed in Hokkaido, Japan and Saumur, France.

In 2025, she hosts the Netflix-original dating reality show Offline Love alongside Takahira Kuruma and Kemuri Matsui of the comedy duo Reiwa Roman.

== Personal life ==
She married actor Masatoshi Nagase in 1995, the couple divorced in 2004.

== Discography ==
As of 2023, Koizumi released 27 original albums, 22 compilation albums, 40 physical singles, 10 digital singles and 17 home-videos.

=== Singles ===
List of singles, with selected chart positions
Year	Single	Peak chart positions	Formats
Year	Single	JPN Physical	Formats
1982	"Watashi no 16sai" （私の16才）	22	CD, LP, Cassette
1982	"Sutekina Lovely Boy" （素敵なラブリーボーイ）	19	CD, LP, Cassette
1982	"Hitori Machikado" （ひとり街角）	13	CD, LP, Cassette
1983	"Harukaze no Yuwaku" （春風の誘惑）	10	CD, LP, Cassette
1983	"Makkana Onnanoko" （まっ赤な女の子）	8	CD, LP, Cassette
1983	"Hanbun Shojo" （半分少女）	4	CD, LP, Cassette
1983	"Ade Sugata Namida Musume" （艶姿ナミダ娘）	3	CD, LP, Cassette
1984	"Climax Goisshoni" （クライマックス御一緒に）	4	CD, LP, Cassette
1984	"Nagisa no Haikara Ningyo" （渚のはいから人魚）	1	CD, LP, Cassette
1984	"Meikyuu no Endroller" （迷宮のアンドローラ）	1	CD, LP, Cassette
1984	"Yamato Nadeshiko Nana Henka" （ヤマトナデシコ七変化）	1	CD, LP, Cassette
1984	"Stardust Memory"	1	CD, LP, Cassette
1985	"Toko Natsu Musume" （常夏娘）	1	CD, LP, Cassette
1985	"Heartbreaker" （ハートブレイカー）	6	CD, LP, Cassette
1985	"Majo" （魔女）	1	CD, LP, Cassette
1985	"Nantettatte Idol" （なんてったってアイドル）	1	CD, LP, Cassette
1986	"100% Danjo Kousai" （100%男女交際）	2	CD, LP, Cassette
1986	"Yoake no Mew" （夜明けのMEW）	2	CD, LP, Cassette
1986	"Kogarashi ni Dakarete" （木枯しに抱かれて）	3	CD, LP, Cassette
1987	"Mizu no Rouge" （水のルージュ）	1	CD, LP, Cassette
1987	"Smile Again"	2	CD, LP, Cassette
1987	"Kiss wo Tomenaide" (キスを止めないで)	1	CD, LP, Cassette
1988	"GOOD MORNING-CALL"	2	CD, LP, Cassette
1988	"Kaito Ruby" (快盗ルビイ)	2	CD, LP, Cassette
1989	"Fade Out"	2	CD, LP, Cassette
1989	"Gakuen Tengoku" (学園天国)	2	CD, LP, Cassette
1990	"Minogashitekure yo" (見逃してくれよ!)	1	CD, Cassette
1990	"La La La…"	10	CD, Cassette
1990	"Oka wo Koete" (丘を越えて)	10	CD, Cassette
1991	"Anata ni Aete Yokatta" (あなたに会えてよかった)	1	CD, Cassette
1992	"Jibun wo Mitsumete" (自分を見つめて)	4	CD, Cassette
1993	"Yasashii Ame" (優しい雨)	2	CD
1994	"My Sweet Home"	4	CD
1994	"Tsuki Hitoshizuku" (月ひとしずく)	7	CD
1995	"BEAUTIFUL GIRLS"	14	CD
1996	"Otokonoko Onnanoko" (オトコのコ オンナのコ)	19	CD
1998	"Nobody can, but you"	78	CD
1999	"for my life"	33	CD
2013	"Shiosai no Memory" (潮騒のメモリー)	2	CD
2014	"T Jiro" (T字路)	14	CD

=== Digital singles ===
List of digital single, with referenced links
Year	Single	Reference
2005	"Atashinchi no Uta"	
2008	"Innocent Love"	
2009	"Niji ga Kiers made"	
2011	"Uchi e Kaerou"	
2011	"Innocent Love (FPM 4/4 DUB MIX)"	
2011	"Sankagetsu Stretch: Sesuji nobashi-hen "	
2011	"Sankagetsu Stretch: Koshi hogushi-hen "	
2012	"100%"	
2022	"Natsu no Time Machine 1982-2022"	

=== Studio albums ===
List of albums, with selected chart positions
Title	Album details	Peak positions
Title	Album details	JPN Oricon
My Fantasy	Released: August 21, 1982; Label: Victor Music Entertainment; Formats: CD, LP, Cassette tape, digital download, streaming	2
Utairo no Kisetsu	Released: December 16, 1982; Label: Victor Music Entertainment; Formats: CD, LP, Cassette tape, digital download, streaming	2
Breezing	Released: July 5, 1983; Label: Victor Music Entertainment; Formats: CD, LP, Cassette tape, digital download, streaming	2
Whisper	Released: December 16, 1983; Label: Victor Music Entertainment; Formats: CD, LP, Cassette tape, digital download, streaming	3
Betty	Released: July 21, 1984; Label: Victor Music Entertainment; Formats: CD, LP, Cassette tape, digital download, streaming	3
Today's Girl	Released: February 21, 1985; Label: Victor Music Entertainment; Formats: CD, LP, Cassette tape, digital download, streaming	1
Flapper	Released: July 5, 1985; Label: Victor Music Entertainment; Formats: CD, LP, Cassette tape, digital download, streaming	2
Kyoko no Kiyoku Tanoshiku Utsukushiku	Released: February 21, 1986; Label: Victor Music Entertainment; Formats: CD, LP, Cassette tape, digital download, streaming	2
Liar	Released: July 23, 1986; Label: Victor Music Entertainment; Formats: CD, LP, Cassette tape, digital download, streaming	8
Hippies	Released: March 5, 1987; Label: Victor Music Entertainment; Formats: CD, LP, Cassette tape, digital download, streaming	2
Phantasien	Released: July 21, 1987; Label: Victor Music Entertainment; Formats: CD, LP, Cassette tape, digital download, streaming	3
BEAT POP: Koizumi Kyoko Super Session	Released: April 5, 1988; Label: Victor Music Entertainment; Formats: CD, LP, Cassette tape, digital download, streaming	2
Natsumelo	Released: December 17, 1988; Label: Victor Music Entertainment; Formats: CD, LP, Cassette tape, digital download, streaming	10
Koizumi in the House	Released: May 21, 1989; Label: Victor Music Entertainment; Formats: CD, LP, Cassette tape, digital download, streaming	9
No.17	Released: July 21, 1990; Label: Victor Music Entertainment; Formats: CD, Cassette tape, digital download, streaming	9
Afropia	Released: July 26, 1991; Label: Victor Music Entertainment; Formats: CD, Cassette tape, digital download, streaming	1
Travel Rock	Released: November 21, 1993; Label: Victor Music Entertainment; Formats: CD, digital download, streaming	13
Otoko no Ko Onna no Ko	Released: November 21, 1996; Label: Victor Music Entertainment; Formats: CD, digital download, streaming	24
Kyo	Released: October 7, 1998; Label: Victor Music Entertainment; Formats: CD, digital download, streaming	29
Atsugi I.C.	Released: April 23, 2003; Label: Victor Music Entertainment; Formats: CD, digital download, streaming	53
Nice Middle	Released: November 26, 2008; Label: Victor Music Entertainment; Formats: CD, digital download, streaming	48
Koizumi Chansonnier	Released: October 24, 2012; Label: Victor Music Entertainment; Formats: CD, digital download, streaming	21

=== EPs ===
List of albums, with selected chart positions
Title	Album details	Peak positions
Title	Album details	JPN Oricon
Separation Kyoko	Released: September 5, 1983; Label: Victor Music Entertainment; Formats: Cassette tape, digital download, streaming	3
Kyon Kyon Club	Released: May 3, 1984; Label: Victor Music Entertainment; Formats: Cassette tape, digital download, streaming	2
Inner Beauty	Released: May 21, 1999; Label: Victor Music Entertainment; Formats: Cassette tape, digital download, streaming	-
Kyō 2	Released: February 21, 2001; Label: Victor Music Entertainment; Formats: Cassette tape, digital download, streaming	-
"—" denotes items which did not chart

=== Soundtrack albums ===
List of soundtrack albums, with selected chart positions
Title	Album details	Peak positions
Title	Album details	JPN Oricon
Boku no Onna ni Te wo Dasuna	Released: 1987; Label: Victor Music Entertainment; Formats: Cassette tape, LP	-
Kaito Rubby	Released: 1988; Label: Victor Music Entertainment; Formats: Cassette tape, LP	-
"—" denotes items which did not chart

=== Live albums ===
List of soundtrack albums, with selected chart positions
Title	Album details	Peak positions
Title	Album details	JPN Oricon
KKPP: Tour 2020 Live at Nakano Sunplaza Hole	Released: September 21, 2022; Label: Victor Music Entertainment; Formats: CD	-
"—" denotes items which did not chart

=== Remix albums ===
List of remix albums, with selected chart positions
Title	Album details	Peak positions
Title	Album details	JPN Oricon
Fade Out: Super Remix Tracks	Released: 1989; Label: Victor Music Entertainment; Formats: CD, Cassette tape	35
Super Remix Tracks II	Released: 1990; Label: Victor Music Entertainment; Formats: CD, Cassette tape	49
Bambinater	Released: 1992; Label: Victor Music Entertainment; Formats: CD, Cassette tape	18
Master Mix Party	Released: 1993; Label: Victor Music Entertainment; Formats: CD	19
89–99 Collection: Koizumix Production	Released: 1999; Label: Victor Music Entertainment; Formats: CD	-
Koizumi Kyoko Night Tempo Presents The Showa Groove	Released: 2022; Label: Victor Music Entertainment; Formats: digital release, streaming	-
"—" denotes items which did not chart

=== Compilation albums ===
List of compilation albums, with selected chart positions
Title	Album details	Peak positions
Title	Album details	JPN Oricon
Super Best: Thank You Kyoko	Released: November 21, 1983; Label: Victor Music Entertainment; Formats: Cassette tape	6
Celebration	Released: December 5, 1984; Label: Victor Music Entertainment; Formats: LP, Cassette tape, CD	4
Do you love me	Released: December 5, 1985; Label: Victor Music Entertainment; Formats: CD, Cassette tape	10
The Best	Released: December 16, 1986; Label: Victor Music Entertainment; Formats: CD, Cassette tape, LP	4
Ballad Classics	Released: December 1, 1987; Label: Victor Music Entertainment; Formats: CD, Cassette tape, LP	3
Best of Kyong King	Released: December 17, 1988; Label: Victor Music Entertainment; Formats: CD, Cassette tape, LP	7
Ballad Classics II	Released: December 17, 1989; Label: Victor Music Entertainment; Formats: CD, Cassette tape	16
K2 Best Seller	Released: March 21, 1992; Label: Victor Music Entertainment; Formats: CD, Cassette tape	2
Anytime	Released: December 1, 1994; Label: Victor Music Entertainment; Formats: CD	12
Kyon 3, Koizumi the Great 51	Released: December 18, 2002; Label: Victor Music Entertainment; Formats: CD	23
K25 Kyoko Koizumi All Time Best	Released: March 21, 2007; Label: Victor Music Entertainment; Formats: CD	23
Collaborakyon	Released: February 16, 2011; Label: Victor Music Entertainment; Formats: CD	110
Kyon30: Nantetatte 30nen!	Released: March 21, 2013; Label: Victor Music Entertainment; Formats: CD	11
Koizumi Chronicle: Complete Single Best 1982-2017	Released: May 17, 2017; Label: Victor Music Entertainment; Formats: CD	5

=== Digital albums ===
List of digital albums, with referenced links
Year	Single	Reference
2008	"Ura K25: KOIZUMI KYOKO ALL TIME BEST 19→38"	
2012	"Kyon30 extra"	
2013	"KP20: 89-08 RARE & MORE COLLECTION"	
2022	"KOIZUMI 3D"	

=== Home video ===
List of albums, with selected chart positions
Title	Album details	Peak positions
Title	Album details	JPN Oricon
Timeless World	Released: September 5, 1982; Label: Victor Entertainment; Formats: VHS, LD	-
Documentary: Hashiri Tsuzukeru Miss Hero Kyoko	Released: December 25, 1985; Label: Victor Entertainment; Formats: VHS, LD	-
Koizumi Cinema Graffiti Making of Boku no Onna ni Te wo Dasuna	Released: December 24, 1986; Label: Victor Entertainment; Formats: VHS, LD	-
Phantasien	Released: August 1, 1987; Label: Victor Entertainment; Formats: VHS, LD	-
BEAT TICK CAMP TOUR '88 Vol.1, Vol.2	Released: September 21, 1988; Label: Victor Entertainment; Formats: VHS, LD	-
Fade Out 〜KYONGKING HONGKONG	Released: July 5, 1989; Label: Victor Entertainment; Formats: VHS, LD	-
National Koizumic Video	Released: August 21, 1990; Label: Victor Entertainment; Formats: VHS, LD	-
Single Single Singles	Released: February 21, 1991; Label: Victor Entertainment; Formats: VHS	-
Kaichōban Koizumic Video	Released: April 21, 1992; Label: Victor Entertainment; Formats: VHS	-
Koizumi Kyoko Uchiijin Setsu	Released: December 23, 1992; Label: Victor Entertainment; Formats: VHS	-
Video Travel Rock	Released: December 16, 1993; Label: Victor Entertainment; Formats: VHS	-
Otoko no ko Onnna no ko Movies	Released: December 18, 1996; Label: Victor Entertainment; Formats: VHS, DVD	-
KYON8	Released: March 21, 2003; Label: Victor Entertainment; Formats: VHS, DVD	-
K25: KOIZUMI KYOKO ALL TIME BEST CLIIPS	Released: February 20, 2008; Label: Victor Entertainment; Formats: DVD	-
Utau Koizumi san	Released: December 22, 2021; Label: Victor Entertainment; Formats: DVD, BD	-
Koizumi Exhibition: Complete Visual Best 1982-2022	Released: March 21, 2022; Label: Victor Entertainment; Formats: DVD, BD	12
KKPP: TOUR 2022 Live at Nakano Sunplaza Hall	Released: September 21, 2022; Label: Victor Entertainment; Formats: DVD, BD	10
"—" denotes items which did not chart

== Filmography ==
=== Film ===
- Seito shokun! (1984), Naoko Kitashiro
- The Adventures of Milo and Otis (1986)
- Leave My Girl Alone (1986)
- Kaitō Ruby (1988)
- Bayside Shakedown: The Movie (1998), Manami Hyuga
- Kyohansha (1999)
- Kaza Hana (2000)
- Onmyoji (2001)
- Blue Spring (2001)
- Rockers (2003)
- What the Snow Brings (2005)
- Hanging Garden (2005)
- Survive Style 5+ (2005)
- Tears for You (2006)
- Love My Life (2006)
- Yajikita Dochu Teresuko (2007)
- Sakuran (2007)
- Tokyo Tower: Mom and Me, and Sometimes Dad (2007)
- Adrift in Tokyo (2007)
- Gu-Gu Datte Neko de Aru (2008)
- Tokyo Sonata (2008)
- Mother Water (2010)
- Bayside Shakedown 3: Set the Guys Loose (2010), Manami Hyuga
- Mainichi Kaasan (2011)
- Kako: My Sullen Past (2016)
- Before We Vanish (2017)
- Eating Women (2018), Atsuko
- Umami (2022), Taya
- Plastic (2023)
- Silence of the Sea (2024), Anna Tamura
- Bushido (2024)
- Belonging (2024)
- I Ai (2024)
- Shinji Muroi: Not Defeated (2024), Manami Hyuga
- Echoes of Kiriko (2026)

=== Television ===
- Toge no Gunzo (1982), Tsuru
- Ato wa Neru Dake (1983)
- Anmitsu Hime (1983)
- Shojo ni Nani ga Okotta ka (1985)
- Hanayome Ningo wa Nemuranai (1986)
- Aishiatteru Kai (1989)
- Ashita wa Atashi no Kaze ga Fuku (1989)
- Papa to Natchan (1991)
- Anata Dake Mienai (1992)
- Chance (1993)
- Aisuru to Iu Koto (1993)
- Boku ga Kanojo ni Shakkin wo Shita Riyu (1994)
- Mada Koi wa Hajimaranai (1995)
- Melody (1997)
- Kamisan Nanka Kowakunai (1998)
- Owari no Nai Dowa (1998)
- Renai Kekkon no Rule (1999)
- Koi wo Nannen Yasundemasu ka (2001)
- Shiritsu Tantei Hama Mike (2002)
- Kawa, Itsuka Umi e (2003)
- Manhattan Love Story (2003)
- Sensei no Kaban (2003)
- Suika (2003)
- Yasashii Jikan (2005)
- Sailor Suit and Machine Gun (2006)
- Hatachi no Koibito (2007)
- Second to Last Love (2012–25)
- Penance (2012)
- Amachan (2013), Haruko Amano
- Totto TV (2016), narrator
- Kangoku no Ohimesama (2017), Kayo Baba
- Idaten (2019), Mitsuko
- First Love (2022)
- Extremely Inappropriate! (2024), herself
- Offline Love (2025), herself as co-host
