= Dance Beat wa Yoake made =

1986 single by Yōko Oginome

Single by Yōko Oginome

from the album Heartbeat Express: Sōshun Monogatari Memorial Album
- Language: Japanese
- English title: Dance Beat Until Dawn
- B-side: "Velvet no Itazura"
- Released: June 10, 1986
- Recorded: 1986
- Genre: J-pop; dance-pop; teen pop
- Length: 3:41
- Label: Victor
- Songwriters: Hiromi Mori; Nobody
- Producer: Tamio Komuro

Yōko Oginome singles chronology
"Flamingo in Paradise" (1986)	"Dance Beat wa Yoake made" (1986)	"Roppongi Junjōha" (1986)

Music video
- "Dance Beat wa Yoake made" on YouTube

"Dance Beat wa Yoake made" (Dance Beatは夜明けまで, Dansu Bīto wa Yoake made; lit. "Dance Beat Until Dawn") is the ninth single by Japanese singer Yōko Oginome. Written by Hiromi Mori and Nobody, the single was released on June 10, 1986, by Victor Entertainment.

== Background and release ==
"Dance Beat wa Yoake made" was used as the opening theme of the TBS drama series Sōshun Monogatari: Watashi, Otona ni Narimasu (早春物語〜私、大人になります〜; Early Spring Story: I Will Be an Adult), which starred Oginome as the lead character Hitomi Okino (沖野 瞳, Okino Hitomi).

The music video features Oginome as a maiden dancing in a lakeside forest. At the end of a video, she sees a door in the middle of the forest and opens it, only to be blinded by the light emitting from the other side of the door.

"Dance Beat wa Yoake made" peaked at No. 4 on Oricon's singles chart and sold over 148,000 copies.

In 1991, Oginome re-recorded the song in a Flamenco style, titled "Dance Beat wa Yoake made (In Sevilla)" (Dance Beatは夜明けまで -in セビーリア-; "Dance Beat Until Dawn -In Sevilla-"); this version was released in the remix album New Take: Best Collections '92.

== Track listing ==
1986 single
No.	Title	Lyrics	Music	Arrangement	Length
1.	"Dance Beat wa Yoake made" (Dansu Bīto wa Yoake made (Dance Beatは夜明けまで; "Dance Beat Until Dawn"))	Hiromi Mori	Nobody	Akira Nishihira	3:41
2.	"Velvet no Itazura" (Berubetto no Itazura (ベルベットの悪戯; "Velvet Mischief"))	Masumi Kawamura	Hiroya Watanabe	Watanabe	4:12

2013 bonus tracks
No.	Title	Length
3.	"Dance Beat wa Yoake made (Original Karaoke)" ((Dance Beatは夜明けまで (オリジナル・カラオケ); "Dance Beat Until Dawn (Original Karaoke)"))
4.	"Velvet no Itazura (Original Karaoke)" ((ベルベットの悪戯 (オリジナル・カラオケ); "Velvet Mischief (Original Karaoke)"))

== Charts ==
Chart (1986)	Peak position
Oricon Weekly Singles Chart	4
The Best Ten	8

Year-end charts

Chart (1986)	Peak position
Oricon Year-End Chart	76
The Best Ten Year-End Chart	69

== See also ==
- 1986 in Japanese music
