= Flamingo in Paradise =

1986 single by Yōko Oginome

Single by Yōko Oginome

from the album Raspberry Wind
- Language: Japanese
- B-side: "Slope ni Tenki Ame"
- Released: March 26, 1986
- Recorded: 1985
- Genre: J-pop; dance-pop; teen pop
- Length: 3:52
- Label: Victor
- Songwriters: Masao Urino; Nobody

Yōko Oginome singles chronology
"Dancing Hero (Eat You Up)" (1985)	"Flamingo in Paradise" (1986)	"Dance Beat wa Yoake made" (1986)

Music video
- "Flamingo in Paradise" on YouTube

"Flamingo in Paradise" (フラミンゴ in パラダイス, Furamingo in Paradaisu) is the eighth single by Japanese singer Yōko Oginome. Written by Masao Urino and Nobody, the single was released on March 26, 1986 by Victor Entertainment.

== Background and release ==
"Flamingo in Paradise" was the first single to be co-written by Urino, who went on to pen several of Oginome's other hit singles by the end of the 1980s. The rock duo Nobody (Yukio Aizawa and Toshio Kihara) also co-wrote many other Oginome songs, including the singles "Dance Beat wa Yoake made" and the No. 1 single "Stranger Tonight".

The B-side, "Slope ni Tenki Ame", was used as the theme song of the anime OVA Bari Bari Densetsu.

The music video features Oginome as a cowgirl crossing the desert. She is also seen wearing the same pink wig and outfit used in the "Dancing Hero (Eat You Up)" video.

"Flamingo in Paradise" peaked at No. 5 on Oricon's singles chart and sold over 146,000 copies.

== Track listing ==
1986 single
No.	Title	Lyrics	Music	Arrangement	Length
1.	"Flamingo in Paradise" (Furamingo in Paradaisu (フラミンゴ in パラダイス))	Masao Urino	Nobody	Motoki Funayama	3:52
2.	"Slope ni Tenki Ame" (Surōpu ni Tenki Ame (スロープに天気雨; "Rainy Weather on the Slope"))	Keiko Asō	Masayoshi Takanaka	Takanaka	4:22

2013 bonus tracks
No.	Title	Length
3.	"Flamingo in Paradise (Original Karaoke)" ((フラミンゴ in パラダイス (オリジナル・カラオケ)))
4.	"Slope ni Tenki Ame (Original Karaoke)" ((スロープに天気雨 (オリジナル・カラオケ); "Rainy Weather on the Slope (Original Karaoke)"))

== Charts ==
Chart (1986)	Peak position
Oricon Weekly Singles Chart	5
The Best Ten	5

Year-end charts

Chart (1986)	Peak position
Oricon Year-End Chart	61
The Best Ten Year-End Chart	49

== See also ==
- 1986 in Japanese music
