= Carlos Toshiki =

Brazilian singer (born 1964)

Carlos Toshiki カルロス・トシキ
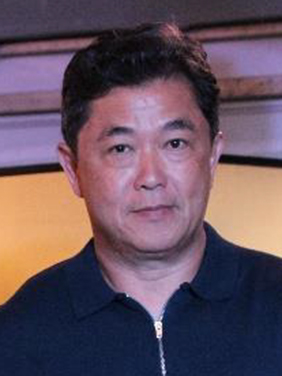
- Toshiki in 2023

Background information
- Also known as: Toshiki Takahashi (鷹橋敏輝)
- Born: Carlos Toshiki Takahashi カルロス・トシキ・タカハシ; 7 April 1964 (age 62); Londrina, Brazil
- Origin: Tokyo, Japan
- Genres: City pop; J-pop
- Occupations: Vocalist; farmer
- Years active: 1982–1995; 2017–present
- Labels: VAP; Warner Music Japan
- Formerly of: Carlos Toshiki & Omega Tribe
- Website: carlostoshiki.com
- Spouse: Minako Nakayama (m. 1995, divorced) Pepe Persida (m. 2018)
- Children: 3

Japanese name
- Hiragana: かるろすとしキ
- Katakana: カルロス・トシキ
Transcriptions
- Romanization: Karurosu Toshiki

Carlos Toshiki Takahashi (カルロス・トシキ・タカハシ, Karurosu Toshiki Takahashi; born 7 April 1964) is a Japanese Brazilian singer and farmer known for being the singer for the Japanese band Omega Tribe from 1986 to 1991. During his time as the lead vocalist of Omega Tribe, he was known for having a soft voice, with the singles "Kimi ha 1000%" and "Aquamarine no Mama de Ite" being hit singles on the Oricon charts.

Born in Brazil to Japanese parents, Toshiki travelled to Japan in 1981 to pursue a career in music, being chosen by producer Koichi Fujita to be the new lead vocalist of Omega Tribe after the disbandment of the previous incarnation of the band. Toshiki and 1986 Omega Tribe were successful, and with one of the members leaving, the band was renamed to Carlos Toshiki & Omega Tribe in 1988 before disbanding in 1991.

After a short solo career, Toshiki retired and returned to Brazil, becoming known for being a garlic specialist and entrepreneur and succeeding in domestically grown garlic. He returned to music in 2017 with the Japanese-American jazz band B-Edge, and tours with them in Japan while growing garlic in Brazil.

== Early life and education ==
Toshiki was born on 7 April 1964 in Londrina, Brazil to Japanese parents, both of whom owned a restaurant in Curitiba and lived a Nikkei community in Maringá. His father, also a radio DJ, played songs from Japan from kayōkyoku and enka, as well as news from Japan. He developed a taste for music at an early age and would lock himself in his room to practice singing for hours after school, memorizing the lyrics phonetically.

His father took notice, and wanted him to be a singer, but Toshiki's stage fright stopped him from doing so. To encourage him, his father promised that if he became the champion of the Nodojiman National Contest, he would send him to Japan for a musical career. Entering various singing contests, Toshiki won the Nodojiman National Contest at the age of 17 with a cover of "Blue Sky Blue" by Hideki Saijo. With his win, his father bought him a plane ticket, and he was able to go to Japan.

== Career ==
=== 1981–1986: Early singing career and move to Japan ===
Toshiki began a job as a dishwasher at a restaurant, where he was paid less than average because he was Brazilian, but it was at the job where he began having opportunities. His boss asked him to sing for customers during breaks, and he gradually became known to the customers. One of the customers invited Toshiki to record commercial jingles. By 1985, after failed attempts to get into a record label and to develop his musical career, Toshiki decided that if he could not get a deal, he would move on with his life and get into a new career.

While still working part time, he took vocal lessons and sung in commercial jingles, making a demo tape with songs in both English and Japanese and sending it to producers in hopes for more commercial work opportunities. One of the tapes were given to Koichi Fujita, a music producer. Fujita had wanted to continue Omega Tribe, which were in the middle of their final tour, and contacted Toshiki for an audition to become their new lead vocalist.

=== 1986–1995: Omega Tribe and solo career ===
In his audition, he was asked to sing covers of "Silence ga Ippai" and "Futari no Natsu Monogatari", ultimately passing the audition and being asked to become Omega Tribe's new vocalist of 1986 Omega Tribe. To help Toshiki get into the aesthetic of the band, as well as to get to know him better, Fujita took him to Hawaii. During the trip, Toshiki commented on the similarity between the Japanese word for "thousand" (千, sen) and the Portuguese word for "hundred" (cem), which Fujita also found interesting, contacting a lyricist to create a song based on the pronunciations. The song would become 1986 Omega Tribe's debut single, "Kimi ha 1000%", which Toshiki sang without understanding most of the lyrics. The single was an instant hit, and the band were able to complete two albums, Navigator in 1986 and Crystal Night in 1987, before one member, guitarist Teruka Kurokawa, left the band due to health issues.

The band's name was then changed to Carlos Toshiki & Omega Tribe, and the remaining members of the band were Toshiki, Shinji Takashima, and Toshitsugu Nishihara; American Joey McCoy would later join the group in November 1988. On 10 August 1988, the group released "Aquamarine no Mama de Ite," which peaked at No. 3 on the Oricon charts and is considered their signature song alongside "Kimi ha 1000%". After four albums, the group announced to the TV program Music Station that they would disband following a tour, officially breaking up on 16 March 1991.

After the disbandment, Toshiki started his solo career with the single "Yoakemade Borderless" in 1991, following up with his first solo studio album Emotion – Migigawa no Heart-tachi e that same year. In 1993, he released the album Alquimist and released Doushitedarou? a year later. In 1994, Toshiki released the single "Forever" under the name Toshiki Takahashi, and a year later, released three more singles and the album Shake It Down, all under TM Factory. The album would be his last album on a major record label since his debut on VAP in 1986.

=== 1995–2016: Musical retirement and farming ===
In 1995, Toshiki suffered from a spinal disc herniation, and after an operation he decided to return to Brazil in 2000 to recover, retiring from music having had no intention to continue in Brazil in a different genre. He became a restaurateur, running his parents' restaurant, before deciding to pursue a career in biotechnology and started working at a seed company. During his time as a restaurateur, he appeared on the Japanese show Anohitohaima!? in 2000.

In 2012, he started attending a university in Brazil to study biotechnology, eventually succeeding in developing garlic that was resistant to heat and diseases that otherwise would have prevented it being grown in Brazil. It has been reported that nearly 100% of domestically produced garlic seeds were bought from Toshiki's company, with Toshiki being described as one of the "great garlic specialists" of Brazil.

=== 2016–present: Return to music ===
In 2016, it was announced that Toshiki would tour in Japan for the first time in 22 years, but the tour was postponed until 2017, where he returned to music with B-Edge, a jazz band with some of the former members of Omega Tribe's backing band. The next year, he toured again with the Turne do Japao 2018 and released his the album Nova Nostalgia, which featured self-covers of past Omega Tribe songs. In 2018, he joined as an official member of B-Edge, leading the band as its main vocalist until 2019; the band was temporarily renamed to Carlos Toshiki & B-Edge during his time as lead vocalist. The band released the album Nova Nostalga in 2018, covering many of Toshiki's songs during the Omega Tribe era.

== Personal life ==
In 1995, Toshiki married Minako Nakayama, whom he had met at a fan club meeting. They moved together to Brazil in 2000, but by 2012, they had separated. By 2018, he was remarried to Pepe Persida, who had a child of her own from a previous marriage. In November 2018, he announced the birth of his child, Arthur Noah Takahashi.

On 10 February 2023, Toshiki was awarded a Commendation by Consul General of Japan in Curitiba Keiji Hamada for his work as a vocalist in Japan.

== Discography ==
Studio albums

- Emotional: Migigawa no Heart Tachi e (1991)
- Alquimist (1993)
- Doushitedarou? (1994)
- Shake It Down (1994)
- Carlos (2000)

== Filmography ==
=== Television ===
Year	Title	Role	Notes
1990	Kimochi ī Koishitai! (キモチいい恋したい!)	Prince Kalmas (カルマス皇太子)	Episode: "Kyūkyoku no Tamanokoshi! Ōji Tōkyō e Kuru" (究極の玉の輿! 王子東京へ来る)
2000	Anohitohaima!? (あの人は今!?)	Himself	
2017	Nonstop! (ノンストップ!)	Himself	Broadcast 9 March 2017
2019	Music More (ミュージック・モア)	Himself	Broadcast on 26 October 2019

== Bibliography ==
- Futari no Carlos (ふたりのカルロス) by Hideki Take, Sony Magazines (1 July 1988)
