= Reiwa Roman =

Japanese comedy duo

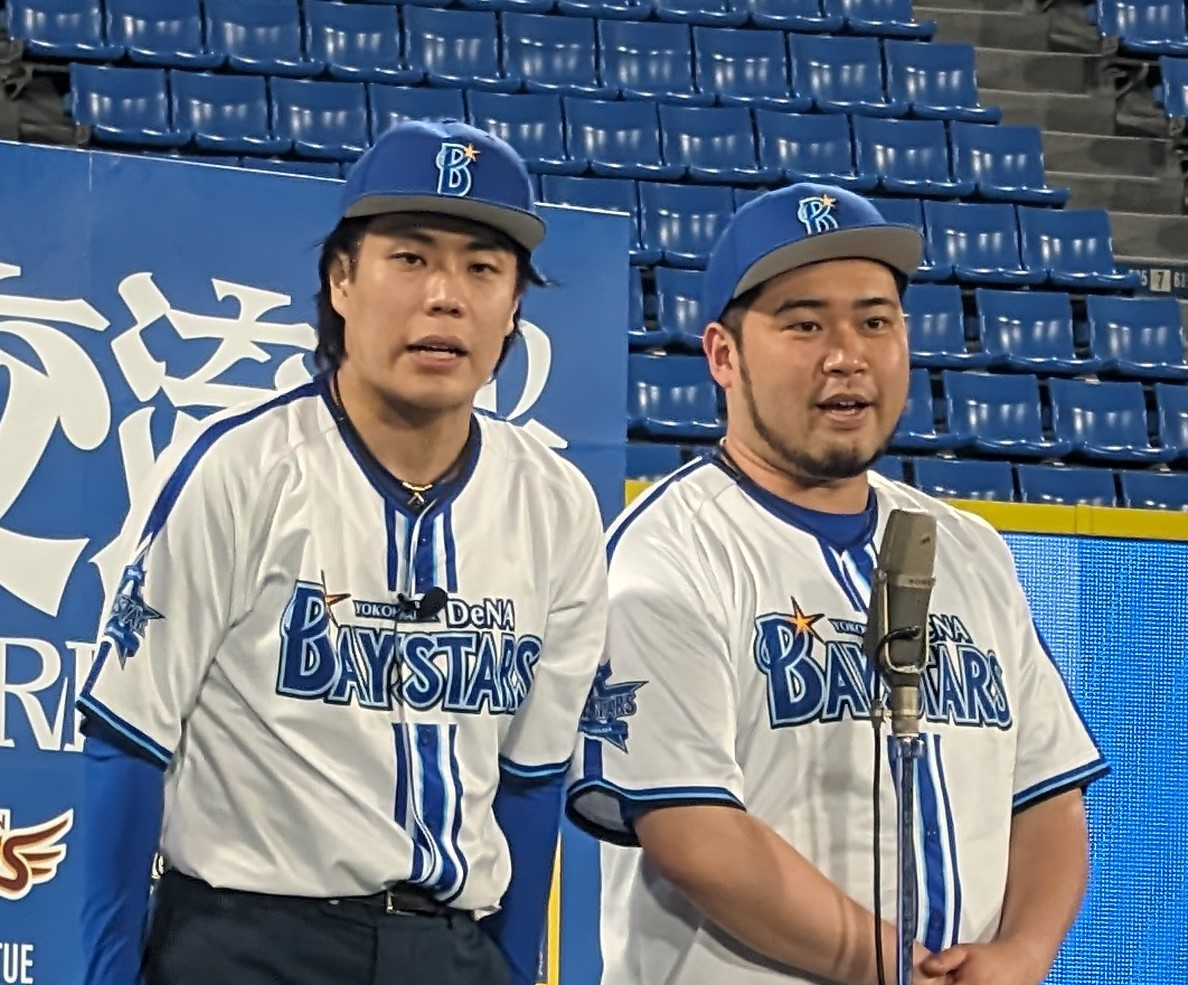

Reiwa Roman (令和ロマン) is a comedy duo affiliated with Yoshimoto Kogyo (吉本興業 東京本社). They were formed in 2018 and are graduates of the 23rd class of NSC Tokyo. Their former duo name was "Majin Bukotsu" (魔人無骨). They are the champions of M-1 Grand Prix 2023 and 2024 and the ABC Comedy Grand Prix 2024.

== Members ==
=== Kuruma Takahira (髙比良 くるま) ===
- Born: September 3, 1994; 31 years ago
- Role: Boke (funny man), stands on the left side
- Real Name: Naoki Takahira (髙比良 直樹)
- Height: 173 cm, Weight: 70 kg, Blood Type: O
- Hometown: Nerima, Tokyo

=== Kemuri Matsui (松井 ケムリ) ===
- Born: May 29, 1993; 32 years ago
- Role: Tsukkomi (straight man), stands on the right side
- Real Name: Koichi Matsui (松井 浩一)
- Height: 173 cm, Weight: 103 kg, Blood Type: A
- Hometown: Yokohama, Kanagawa
