= Omega Tribe (music project) =

Japanese rock band

- The Omega logo used from 1983 to 1987

Background information
- Origin: Japan
- Genres: City pop; album-oriented rock; synth pop
- Years active: 1983–1994
- Labels: VAP; Warner Music Japan
- Spinoffs: S. Kiyotaka & Omega Tribe; Carlos Toshiki & Omega Tribe

Omega Tribe (オメガトライブ, Omega Toraibu) was a Japanese music project led by producer Koichi Fujita from 1983 to 1995. With the help of composers Tetsuji Hayashi, Tsunehiro Izumi, and Hiroshi Shinkawa, the project had three different bands with three different lead vocalists: Kiyotaka Sugiyama (1983–1985), Carlos Toshiki (1986–1991), and Masahito Arai (1993–1994). Under Fujita's directions, recordings were performed by studio musicians and production handled by the project's production team. The project has been described as helping form the city pop sound, especially with the project's usage of summer and sea themes.

== Background ==
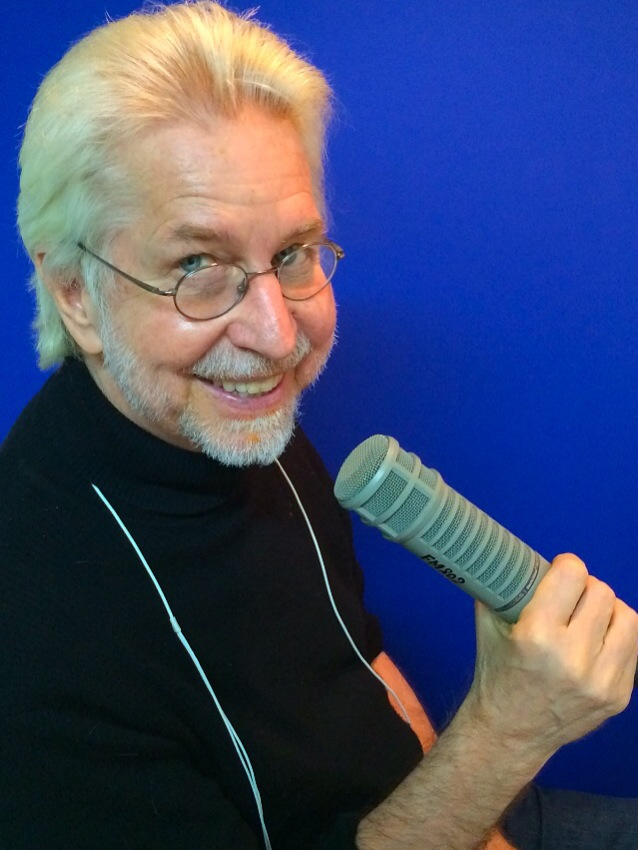
The name "Omega Tribe" was suggested by Hawaiian DJ Kamasami Kong.

The name Omega Tribe was suggested by Hawaiian DJ Kamasami Kong, who described the name as a combination of the Greek letter omega (Ω, ω), meaning "last", and "the last race". The name, according to Sugiyama himself, was at the bottom of the list of candidates. The members liked the name ykes, but Fujita chose the name Omega Tribe as he liked how it could be interpreted as relating to the saṃsāra. When asked about the origin of the band name on a song program, the members of S. Kiyotaka & Omega Tribe explained that they were "the last companion" to give a heavy impression to the "final race".

Production was handled by Fujita alongside his production team of lyricists, composers, and arrangers, with recordings done by the lead vocalist and session musicians. The members not being able to participate in recordings was the main reason why S. Kiyotaka & Omega Tribe disbanded in 1985. During the 1986 and Carlos Toshiki eras, the project hired African-American musicians to be backing members of the band, including drummer Marty Bracey, bassist Wornell Jones, vocalist Maxayn Lewis, and vocalist Joey McCoy, who would later join as an official member in 1988.

== History ==
=== 1983–1985: S. Kiyotaka & Omega Tribe ===
S. Kiyotaka & Omega Tribe (杉山清貴&オメガトライブ) was the first band in the project that was active from 1983 to 1985. It consisted of lead vocalist Kiyotaka Sugiyama, rhythm guitarist Shinji Takashima, lead guitarist Kenji Yoshida, keyboardist Toshitsugu Nishihara, bassist Takao Oshima, and drummer Keiichi Hiroishi. The band was initially formed as Cutie Panchos (きゅうてぃぱんちょす) in 1978, the band was scouted by Fujita after their performance at the 20th Yamaha Popular Song Contest in 1980.

Fujita and composer Tetsuji Hayashi produced their discography, which consisted of five albums: Aqua City (1983), River's Island (1984), Never Ending Summer (1984), Another Summer (1985), and First Finale (1985). The band consistently ranked on the top ten on the albums chart, with their final two albums Another Summer and First Finale topping the charts in 1985. Growing frustration from the members towards the production team, which hired studio musicians to complete the band's work on studio recordings, eventually made the band decide to break up in 1985 at the peak of their popularity.

=== 1986–1991: 1986 Omega Tribe and Carlos Toshiki & Omega Tribe ===
Carlos Toshiki & Omega Tribe (カルロス・トシキ&オメガトライブ) was the second band in the project that was active from 1986 to 1991. Originally formed as 1986 Omega Tribe (1986オメガトライブ), the band consisted of lead vocalist Carlos Toshiki and guitarist Teruka Kurokawa as well as Takashima and Nishihara, who both returned to the project. After Kurokawa left the band in 1988, the band changed its name and later welcomed vocalist Joey McCoy as a fourth member that same year.

As 1986 Omega Tribe, the band released two albums, Navigator (1986) and Crystal Night (1987), while as Carlos Toshiki & Omega Tribe, they released four, Down Town Mystery (1988), Be Yourself (1989), Bad Girl (1989), and Natsuko (1990). Like its predecessor, the band was produced by Fujita with the help of Tsunehiro Izumi and Hiroshi Hinkawa and used studio musicians, but the members were given more leeway to help with the production. Differences in the selection of songs for Natsuko and the dissonance between the members led to the disbandment in 1991, following a final tour.

=== 1993–1994: Brand New Omega Tribe ===
Brand New Omega Tribe (ブランニュー・オメガトライブ) was the third and final band in the project that was active from 1993 to 1994. The final band in the Omega Tribe project under Fujita, the band only released one album, Beach Hippies (1994), before it split. Unlike the previous bands, Brand New Omega Tribe only consisted of its lead singer, Masahito Arai, and is considered a solo project.

Masahito had met with Fujita and agreed to be the new vocalist for Omega Tribe after the break up of Carlos Toshiki & Omega Tribe two years prior, and instead of other members performing the instrumentals, the songs were produced by Fujita and his production team with the help of studio musicians. BNOT released one album, Beach Hippies (1994) before it was disbanded. Beach Hippies had a New Jack Swing influence, which is somewhat of a sonic departure from their previous iterations, but it also included a cover version of Alone Again from the Omega Tribe album Aqua City.

== Related projects ==
=== 1992: Deconstructed OMEGA by Mints Entertainment ===
Deconstructed OMEGA by Mints Entertainment (D.O.M.E.) was a short-lived offshoot band that consisted of guitarist Shinji Takashima, keyboardist Toshitsugu Nishihara, vocalist Satoshi Mikami, drummer Michihisa Ikeda, and bassist Soichi Sakauchi. The band was formed after the disbandment of Carlos Toshiki & Omega Tribe, releasing only one album, D.O.M.E. (1992), before disbanding due to a lack of success.

=== 1994–1996: Weather Side ===
Weather Side (ウェザーサイド) was an offshoot band that consisted of guitarist Shinji Takashima, keyboardist Toshitsugu Nishihara, and vocalist Hideaki Takatori. The band was Takatori's debut as a vocalist, releasing three albums, Driving A Go Go (1994), Happy Go Lucky (1994), and 30 °C (1995), before disbanding. The band was produced by Seiji Kameda, who also provided bass for the band.

=== 2015–present: B-EDGE ===
B-EDGE (ビーエッジ) is a Japanese-American jazz band formed in 2015 with members of the backing band of Carlos Toshiki & Omega Tribe, including drummer Marty Bracey, bassist Wornell Jones, and woodwindist Teruo Gotō. It consists of Bracey, Jones, Gotō, as well as keyboardist Tomoharu Hani and guitarist Nishiyama "Hank" Fumio. They released their debut album, Easy Loving You, in 2015.

In September 2016, Carlos Toshiki announced that he would begin touring with B-EDGE after a 21-year music hiatus, but the tour was postponed until 2017, commemorating the 31st anniversary of his debut with 1986 Omega Tribe. The next year, he announced a tour and album with B-EDGE, releasing the album Nova Nostalgia (2018) with the band under the name Carlos Toshiki & B-EDGE, which peaked at 92nd place on the Billboard Japan Top Albums. They reverted back to the name B-EDGE in 2019 after Toshiki left the band, although he still tours with them for his solo career.

== Band members ==
| Image | Name | Years active | Instruments | Release contributions |
|---|---|---|---|---|
| | Kiyotaka Sugiyama (杉山 清貴) | 1983–1985 | lead vocals; rhythm guitar | All S. Kiyotaka & Omega Tribe releases. As an outside collaborator Be Yourself (1989) – composer ("Last Train") |
| | Shinji Takashima (高島 信二) | 1983–1985; 1986–1991 | rhythm guitar; lead guitar; backing vocals | All S. Kiyotaka & Omega Tribe, 1986 Omega Tribe, and Carlos Toshiki & Omega Tribe releases. |
| | Kenji Yoshida (吉田 健二) | 1983–1985 | lead guitar; backing vocals | All S. Kiyotaka & Omega Tribe releases until Never Ending Summer (1984), left the band in April 1985. |
| | Toshitsugu Nishihara (西原 俊次) | 1983–1985; 1986–1991 | keyboards; backing vocals | All S. Kiyotaka & Omega Tribe, 1986 Omega Tribe, and Carlos Toshiki & Omega Tribe releases. |
| | Keiichi Hiroishi (廣石 恵一) | 1983–1985; (died 2025) | drums; percussion | All S. Kiyotaka & Omega Tribe releases. |
| | Takao Oshima (大島 孝夫) | 1983–1985 | bass; backing vocals | All S. Kiyotaka & Omega Tribe releases. |
| | Carlos Toshiki (カルロス・トシキ) | 1986–1991 | lead vocals | All 1986 Omega Tribe and Carlos Toshiki & Omega Tribe releases. |
| | Teruka Kurokawa (黒川 照家) | 1986–1988; (died 2020) | lead guitar; backing vocals | All 1986 Omega Tribe releases until Down Town Mystery (1988). |
| | Joey McCoy (ジョイ・マッコイ) | 1987–1988 (backing); 1988–1991 | backing and lead vocals, keyboards, percussion | All Carlos Toshiki & Omega Tribe releases from Be Yourself (1989), joined as a backing member in 1987 before joining officially with the single "Reiko". |
| | Masahito Arai (新井 正人) | 1993–1994 | lead vocals | All Brand New Omega Tribe releases. |

== Discography ==
S. Kiyotaka & Omega Tribe

- Aqua City (1983)
- River's Island (1984)
- Never Ending Summer (1984)
- Another Summer (1985)
- First Finale (1985)

1986 Omega Tribe and Carlos Toshiki & Omega Tribe

- Navigator (1986)
- Crystal Night (1987)
- Down Town Mystery (1988)
- Be Yourself (1989)
- Bad Girl (1989)
- Natsuko (1990)

Brand New Omega Tribe

- Beach Hippies (1994)

== Awards and nominations ==
=== Tokyo Music Festival ===
| Year | Nominee / work | Award | Result |
|---|---|---|---|
| 1983 | "Summer Suspicion" | Domestic Tournament Golden Apple Award | Won |
| 1983 | "Summer Suspicion" | World Tournament TBS Award | Won |

=== Recording Industry Association of Japan ===
| Year | Nominee / work | Award | Result |
|---|---|---|---|
| 1987 | Navigator | Pops (Group) Division | Won |
