= Carlos Toshiki & Omega Tribe =

Japanese city pop band

- Carlos Toshiki & Omega Tribe c. 1981–1991; Top row: Toshitsugu Nishihara and Joey McCoy; Bottom row: Carlos Toshiki and Shinji Takashima

Background information
- Also known as: 1986 Omega Tribe (1986–1988)
- Origin: Tokyo, Japan
- Genres: City pop; J-pop
- Years active: 1986–1991
- Labels: VAP; Warner Music Japan
- Spinoff of: Omega Tribe
- Past members: Carlos Toshiki; Shinji Takashima; Toshitsugu Nishihara; Teruka Kurokawa; Joey McCoy

Carlos Toshiki & Omega Tribe (カルロス・トシキ&オメガトライブ, Karurosu Toshiki & Omega Toraibu) was a Japanese band from Tokyo, Japan. Originally formed as 1986 Omega Tribe (1986オメガトライブ), the original 1986 formation consisted of Japanese Brazilian vocalist Carlos Toshiki, rhythm guitarist Shinji Takashima, lead guitarist Teruka Kurokawa, and keyboardist Toshitsugu Nishihara. Kurokawa's departure from the band in March 1988, as well as its outdated year, caused the band to be renamed to Carlos Toshiki & Omega Tribe, with American vocalist Joey McCoy officially joining the band in July 1988.

Part of the Omega Tribe project by producer Koichi Fujita, the band was created by Fujita as a way to continue the project after the disbandment of S. Kiyotaka & Omega Tribe the previous year; Takashima and Nishihara had previously been in that band, and had expressed opposition to their disbandment. As 1986 Omega Tribe, the band released two albums, Navigator (1986) and Crystal Night (1987), both of which reached the top three on the Oricon Albums Chart. As Carlos Toshiki & Omega Tribe, they released four albums, Down Town Mystery (1988), Be Yourself (1989), Bad Girl (1989), and Natsuko (1990). The songs "Kimi wa 1000%" and "Aquamarine no Mama de Ite" are considered Toshiki's signature songs during his time as Omega Tribe's vocalist.

Like its predecessor, recordings were done by session musicians, though members of the band were given more leeway with compositions, with all the members writing at least one song. The band broke up on March 16, 1991, after a final tour.

== History ==
=== 1985–1986: Formation and debut as 1986 Omega Tribe ===
The formation in 1986, with Teruka Kurokawa at the far left

Toshiki was a Japanese Brazilian who was working part-time in Japan as a dishwasher and had made demo tapes with covers of English-language songs that were distributed to various companies, one of them being given to Fujita. Fujita invited Toshiki and asked him to cover "Futari no Natsu Monogatari" and "Silence ga Ippai" for an audition, and after practicing, passed the audition at VAP's recording studio and was chosen as Omega Tribe's new vocalist. After Toshiki was made the vocalist of a new group, Fujita had guitarist Shinji Takashima and keyboardist Toshitsugu Nishihara, both previously part of S. Kiyotaka & Omega Tribe, join the band. He also hired guitarist Teruka Kurokawa, who was part of Momoko Kikuchi's backing band and made him the bandleader.

To help Toshiki get into the aesthetic of the band, as well as to get to know him better, Fujita took him to Hawaii. During the trip, Toshiki commented on the similarity between the Japanese word for "thousand" (千, sen) and the Portuguese word for "hundred" (cem), which Fujita also found interesting, contacting a lyricist to create a song based on the pronunciations. The song would become 1986 Omega Tribe's debut single, "Kimi ha 1000%", which Toshiki sang without understanding most of the lyrics.

=== 1986–1988: Initial success and Kurokawa's departure ===
"Kimi ha 1000%" was an instant hit, reaching 6th place on the Oricon Singles Chart and becoming one of Toshiki's signature songs. They released their debut album Navigator on July 23, 1986, which reached 2nd place on the Oricon Albums Chart and won them an award from the Recording Industry Association of Japan. The album featured a swordfish on the cover, which became a symbol of the band during the 1986 era, as well as having "resort-like lyrics" for the new era of Omega Tribe. On August 7, 1986, the band released their second single, "Super Chance", which was written by lyricist Masao Urino charted at 2nd place on the Oricon Singles Chart. The band started production on their second album, Crystal Night near the end of 1986, with the production team showing an interest in electric sounds based on American black contemporary music, releasing the album on February 4, 1987.

In March 1987, the band started production for a third album. Kurokawa left the band in the middle of the production in March due to health issues, and with the outdated name, it was decided to rename the band Carlos Toshiki & Omega Tribe. They released the first single under that name, "Down Town Mystery", on March 9, 1998, later releasing the album of the same name on April 6, 1988. Both the single and the album had two different versions, the Nighttime version and the Daylight version, mixed by two different engineers.

=== 1988–1991: Name change and disbandment ===
The band started work on their next studio album Be Yourself in March 1988, releasing the single "Aquamarine no Mama de Ite" on August 10, 1988, which peaked at 3rd place on the single's chart. With Kurokawa's absence, Fujita wanted another member to help with the stage visuals, deciding to hire backing singer Joey McCoy as he participated in the recordings and live performances. In November 1988, McCoy joined as an official member with the song "Reiko", sung by McCoy and released in both Japanese and English. Be Yourself was released on February 8, 1989, and began working on a follow-up album in the next seven months. On September 21, 1989, they released the album Bad Girl, which featured a more active participation by the members in the production. All four of the members had compositions and the album was pop rock-oriented, unlike their previous albums.

On June 25, 1990, they released their final single "Toki wa Kagerō", which was written by singer Yumi Matsutoya and later featured on her 1990 album Tengoku no Door. The band released their final album, Natsuko on July 25, 1990, their only album after their transfer to Warner Pioneer. During the production of Natsuko, there was a dissonance between the production team and the members, as well as between the members themselves. Fujita and Toshiki disagreed about the selection of songs that would be in the album, with Fujita eventually leaving most of the production to the members, especially Toshiki. On December 14, 1990, the band announced that they would be disbanding following a final tour that began on February 21, 1991, disbanding after the tour's final performance on March 16, 1991.

=== 2017–present: Resurgence ===
Although Toshiki retired from music in 1995, he returned with a tour with the jazz band B-EDGE in 2017 on the 31st anniversary of his debut. They released one album, Nova Nostalgia (2018), which featured covers of Omega Tribe songs from his era as the vocalist. On February 24, 2021, VAP released the compilation album To Your Summertime Smile for the band's 35th anniversary which included remixed versions of 1986 Omega Tribe songs. On June 15, 2022, VAP and Warner Music Japan released separate editions of the remix album The Reverb 2022 Omega Tribe, which was supervised by Hiroshi Shinkawa.

== Band members ==
=== Main members ===
- Carlos Toshiki (カルロス・トシキ) – lead vocals (1986–1991)
- Shinji Takashima (高島 信二) – guitar (1986–1991)
- Toshitsugu Nishihara (西原 俊次) – keyboards (1986–1991)
- Teruka Kurokawa (黒川 照家) – guitar (1986–1988; died 2020)
- Joey McCoy (ジョイ・マッコイ) – backing vocals, lead vocals, (Note: For the singles "Reiko", "Reiko (English version)", and the song "Automation" from Natsuko.) keyboards, percussion (1988–1991)

=== Backing and touring members ===
- Masato Taguchi (田口 政人) – bass (1986)
- Yoshikazu Yoshiura (吉浦 芳一) – drums (1986)
- Shigeru Watanabe (渡辺 茂) – bass (1986–1987; died 2016)
- Teruo Gotō (後藤 輝夫) – saxophone (1987–1991)
- Tetsuya Osaka (大阪 哲也) – keyboards (1986–1991)
- Marty Bracey (マーティー・ブレイシー) – drums (1988–1991)
- Wornell Jones (ウォーネル・ジョーンズ) – bass (1987–1991)

== Discography ==
=== Studio albums ===
List of studio albums with chart positions and sales
Title	Album details	Peak chart positions
Title	Album details	Oricon
Navigator	Released: July 23, 1986; Label: VAP; Formats: LP, cassette	2
Crystal Night	Released: February 4, 1987; Label: VAP; Formats: LP, cassette	2
Down Town Mystery	Released: April 6, 1988; Label: VAP; Formats: LP, cassette, CD	3
Be Yourself	Released: February 8, 1989; Label: VAP; Formats: LP, cassette, CD	9
Bad Girl	Released: September 21, 1989; Label: VAP; Formats: LP, cassette, CD	11
Natsuko	Released: July 25, 1990; Label: VAP; Formats: LP, cassette, CD	13

== Awards and nominations ==
=== Recording Industry Association of Japan ===
Year	Nominee / work	Award	Result
1986	Navigator	Pops (Group) Division	Won

== See also ==
- Omega Tribe
