= VAP Inc. =

Japanese entertainment company

- Logo used since 2026

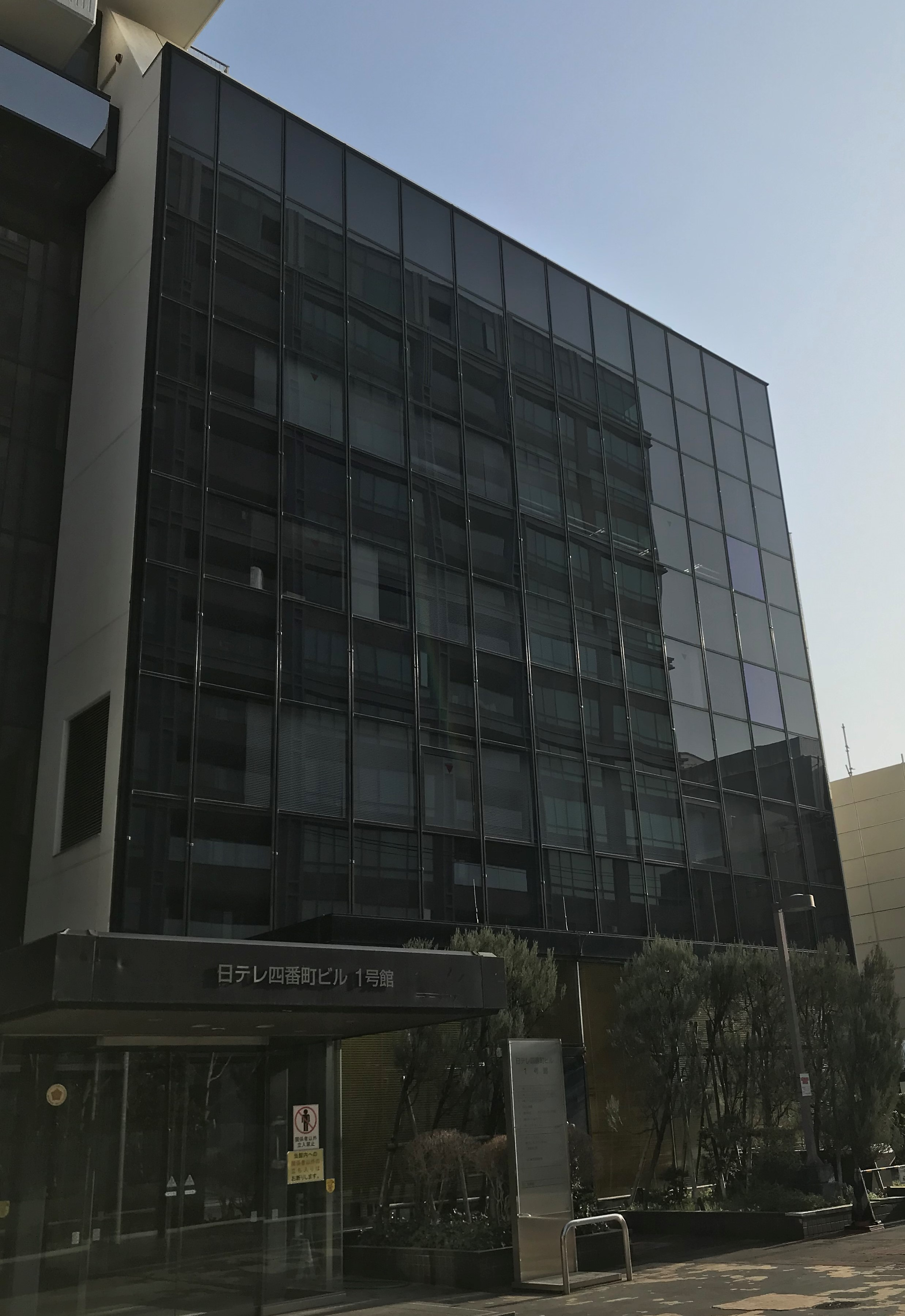
- Headquarters in Chiyoda, Tokyo
- Native name: 株式会社バップ
- Romanized name: Kabushiki gaisha Bappu
- Type: Subsidiary
- Industry: Media publishing (video, audio)
- Founded: January 24, 1981; 45 years ago
- Headquarters: Yonbanchō, Chiyoda, Tokyo, Japan
- Key people: Yohei Yamakawa (president)
- Parent: Nippon Television Holdings
- Subsidiaries: Sound Inn Studios
- Website: www.vap.co.jp

Logo used from 1981 to 2026

VAP Inc. (Japanese: 株式会社バップ, Hepburn: Kabushiki gaisha Bappu) (initials of Video & Audio Project) is a Japanese entertainment company, headquartered in Chiyoda, Tokyo. It is a subsidiary of Nippon Television Holdings.

== Artists ==
- Momoko Kikuchi
- Omega Tribe, in its incarnations in the 80s and early 90s, including:
  - Sugiyama Kiyotaka & Omega Tribe
    - In addition, Sugiyama was the lead singer of Omega Tribe in the early-to-mid-80s and, upon the band's dissolution in 1985, was signed to VAP as a Solo act until 1990 and again from 2000 to 2010.
  - 1986 Omega Tribe
  - Carlos Toshiki & Omega Tribe
- Blüe (1998–2002)
- Coldrain (2008–2017)
- Concerto Moon
- Eastern Youth
- Edge of Spirit
- Fear, and Loathing in Las Vegas (2010–2017)
- Galneryus
- Girls on the Run
- Aya Hisakawa
- Nightmare (Japanese band) (2006–2011)
- Nobuyuki Hiyama
- Last Alliance
- Maximum the Hormone (2002–2018)
- NoisyCell
- Hajime Mizoguchi
- Toshiyuki Morikawa
- Yuji Ohno (LUPINTIC Label)
- Ogre You Asshole
- Pay Money to My Pain
- Saber Tiger
- Momoko Sakura
- Sendai Kamotsu
- S.E.S.
- Yuri Shiratori
- Suzume
- White Ash
- Zwei (2004–2007)

== Japanese television, drama, and anime on DVD/Blu-ray ==
- Akagi
- All Japan Pro Wrestling (wrestling compilations featuring matches from 1972–2000)
- Bagi, the Monster of Mighty Nature (produced for Nippon TV)
- Berserk
- Death Note
- Dōbutsu no Mori
- Elfen Lied
- Endride
- Flying Witch
- Future GPX Cyber Formula
- Hajime no Ippo
- Heisei Ultraseven
- Hunter × Hunter
- Kaiba
- Kaiji
- Kōryū no Mimi
- Let's Go! Anpanman
- Lupin the Third
- Maho no Tenshi Creamy Mami
- Mamawa Shogaku Yonensei
- Master Keaton
- Mirmo! (TV Tokyo)
- Monkey
- Monster
- My Deer Friend Nokotan
- My Love Story!!
- Nana
- Neuro: Supernatural Detective
- Pro Wrestling NOAH (wrestling compilations featuring matches from 2000–2020)
- Red Baron (1994–95 VHS release only; recent Blu-ray releases were licensed to Warner Bros. Home Entertainment)
- Saint Seiya: The Lost Canvas
- Super Mario Bros.: The Great Mission to Rescue Princess Peach!
- Tenchi Muyo!
- The Seven Deadly Sins (Seasons 3–4 only)
- Urahara
- The Water Margin

== Core members ==
=== Broadcaster of Nippon News Network and Nippon Television Network System ===
- Mitsubishi Corporation
- Nippon Television Network
- Akita Broadcasting System
- Sapporo Television Broadcasting
- Yamagata Broadcasting Company Limited
- Miyagi Media Television
- Yamanashi Broadcasting System
- Chūkyō Television Broadcasting
- Kita Nippon Broadcasting
- Fukui Broadcasting Corporation
- Yomiuri Telecasting Corporation
- Hiroshima Telecasting Co., Ltd.
- Yamaguchi Broadcasting Company Limited
- Fukuoka Broadcasting System
- JRT Shikoku Broadcasting Corporation
- Nishinippon Broadcasting Co., Ltd.
- Nankai Broadcasting Co., Ltd.
- RKC Kouchi Broadcasting Corporation
- RAB Aomori Broadcasting Corporation

=== Nippon Television Network Business Company ===
- RF Radio Japan
- Nippon TV Music

=== Yomiuri Shimbun Partnership Company ===
- Radio Kansai

== Video games ==
- Kick Challenger: Air Foot - Yasai no Kuni no Ashi Senshi (Famicom Disk System)
- Doki! Doki! Yūenchi: Crazy Land Daisakusen (Famicom)
- Ganso Saiyūki: Super Monkey Daibōken (Famicom)
- Isolated Warrior (Famicom)
- Sprinter Monogatari: Mezase!! Ikkaku Senkin (Super Famicom)
- Shigetaka Kashiwagi's Top Water Bassing (Super Famicom)
- Tao (Famicom)
- Kōryū no Mimi (Super Famicom)
- Q*bert 3 (Super Famicom)
- Shippo de Bun (Game Boy)
- Power Missiøn (Game Boy)
- Super Street Basketball (Game Boy)
- Super Street Basketball 2 (Game Boy)
- Cooking Densetsu (Game Boy)
- Big Thanks Super Keirin (Sega Saturn)

== See also ==
- Toy's Factory (a spin-off company from VAP)
