= De-Luxe (album) =

Studio album by Yōko Oginome with Ugo Ugo Lhuga
- Released: July 21, 1993
- Recorded: 1993
- Genres: J-pop; children's
- Length: 26:13
- Language: Japanese
- Label: Victor
- Producer: Yōko Oginome

Yōko Oginome chronology
Best Hits Non Stop Clubmix (1992)	De-Luxe (1993)	Scandal (1994)

Singles from De-Luxe
- 1. "Yumemiru Planet" Released: May 21, 1993

De-Luxe (デラックス, Derakkusu) is a studio album by Japanese singer/songwriter Yōko Oginome in collaboration with the Fuji TV children's variety show Ugo Ugo Lhuga (ウゴウゴ・ルーガ, Ugo Ugo Rūga). Released through Victor Entertainment on July 21, 1993, it was Oginome's first self-produced album and features the voices of Hidetō Tajima as Ugo Ugo-kun, Yuka Koide as Lhuga-chan, Ikuko Sakurai as Terebi-kun, and Oginome as Planet-chan. The album was reissued on May 26, 2010 with ten bonus tracks as part of Oginome's 25th anniversary celebration.

The album peaked at No. 35 on Oricon's albums chart and sold over 19,000 copies.

== Track listing ==
No.	Title	Lyrics	Music	Arrangement	Length
1.	"Kokugo, Sansuu, Rika, Shakai Kyosokyoku" ((国・算・理・社 狂騒曲; "Country/Arithmetic/Science/Company Frenzy"))	YOKO	YOKO	Soichi Terada	4:32
2.	"Talk 1"				0:06
3.	"Heaven"	Neko Oikawa	Manabu Kamoi	Nittoku Inoue	3:13
4.	"Talk 2"				0:34
5.	"Shiawase wa Sunadokei no Yō ni" ((幸せは砂時計のように; "Happiness Is Like an Hourglass"))	Oikawa	Nao Asada	Inoue	3:24
6.	"Talk 3"				0:20
7.	"Always"	Oikawa	Kenji Hayashida	Chokkaku	5:20
8.	"Talk 4"				0:45
9.	"You're My Angel"	YOKO	YOKO	Terada	4:08
10.	"Talk 5"				0:13
11.	"Yumemiru Planet" (Yumemiru Puranetto (夢見るPLANET; "The Dreaming Planet"))	Yumi Yoshimoto	Asada	Shirō Sagisu	3:32
Total length:					26:13

2010 bonus tracks
No.	Title	Lyrics	Music	Arrangement	Length
12.	"Inochi no Uta" ((生命の詩; "Song of Life"))	Takashi Matsumoto	Katsuhisa Hattori	Takayuki Hattori	6:09
13.	"Ai wa Yume, Koi wa Maboroshi" ((愛はユメ恋はマボロシ; "Love Is a Dream, Love Is an Illusion"))	Miyuki Asano	Akitoshi Onodera	Yukio Sugai; Kōichi Kaminaga; Ryūjin Inoue	3:56
14.	"Tokyo Girl (Club Mix Version)"	Matsumoto	Kenji Hayashida	E.S.P.	4:52
15.	"Umi no Sango" ((海の珊瑚; "Sea Coral"))	Matsumoto	Hayashida	Masayuki Iwata	4:32
16.	"Romance" (Romanse (ロマンセ))	Toyohisa Araki	Traditional ("Romance Anónimo")	Edison	3:57
17.	"Kuroi Hitomi" ((黒い瞳; "Dark Eyes"))	Araki	Traditional ("Dark Eyes")	Edison	3:59
18.	"Mystery in Love"	Kayoko Ono	Hinoky Team	Keiichi Takahashi	4:18
19.	"Born to Be Wild"	Oginome	Hinoky Team	Takahashi	4:51
20.	"Kyō kara Hajime yō (Duet with Kazuhito Murata)" ((今日から始めよう; "Let's Start Today"))	Yasushi Akimoto	Tsugutoshi Gotō	Gotō	5:51
21.	"Tokyo Girl (Original Version)"	Matsumoto	Hayashida		4:50
Total length:					47:18

== Charts ==
Chart (1993)	Peak position
Japanese Albums (Oricon)	35
