= Johnny Frigo =

American jazz musician

Background information
- Birth name: John Virgil Frigo
- Born: December 27, 1916; Chicago, Illinois, U.S.
- Died: July 4, 2007 (aged 90); Chicago, Illinois, U.S.
- Genres: Jazz
- Occupation: Musician
- Instrument(s): Violin, double bass
- Labels: Arbors, Chesky

Johnny Frigo (December 27, 1916 – July 4, 2007) was an American jazz violinist, bassist and songwriter. He appeared in the 1940s as a violinist before working as a bassist. He returned to the violin in the 1980s and enjoyed a comeback, recording several albums as a leader.

== Biography ==
Frigo was born in Chicago and studied violin for three years beginning at age seven. In high school he started to play double bass in dance orchestras. In 1942 he played with Chico Marx's orchestra and performed a comedy routine on violin with Marx on piano. He entered the United States Coast Guard during World War II and played in a band on Ellis Island with Al Haig and Kai Winding.

After a brief turn at active service near the end of the war he moved to New Jersey. He toured with Jimmy Dorsey's band from 1945 to 1947, later forming the Soft Winds trio with Dorsey's guitarist Herb Ellis and pianist Lou Carter. During this time he wrote the music and lyrics to "Detour Ahead", which has been recorded by Billie Holiday, Sarah Vaughan, Ella Fitzgerald, Bill Evans, and Carola. During that time, he also wrote the sardonic swing tune "I Told Ya I Love Ya, Now Get Out" which was recorded by June Christy and the Stan Kenton Orchestra. Chicago jazz vocalist Erin McDougald recorded the song 50 years later on her album The Auburn Collection (2004).

In 1951, Frigo returned to Chicago, primarily working as a studio bassist and arranger. He also led the band at Mr. Kelly's, a popular Rush Street nightspot. Between 1951 and 1960 he played fiddle hoedowns and novelties with the Sage Riders, the house band for the WLS radio program National Barn Dance. He played with the Sage Riders for another fourteen years after WGN revived the show in 1961. In that time he worked with Chicago jazz vocalist Anita O'Day in live and studio recordings done in Chicago. He was featured (on bass) on O'Day's quartet version of "No Soap, No Hope Blues". Frigo is credited as playing fiddle for the track "A Rectangle Picture" on the Mason Proffit album Wanted released in 1969 on the Happy Tiger label.

In the mid-1980s Frigo largely abandoned playing bass to concentrate on violin. After performing with Monty Alexander, Ray Brown, and Herb Ellis at Chicago's Jazz Showcase, he was invited by Alexander to join the trio for several live dates that produced Triple Treat II and Triple Treat III (Concord, 1987). Johnny Carson asked Frigo why it took so long to start his career as a violinist. Frigo replied, "I wanna take as long as I could in my life so I wouldn't have time to become a has-been".

He performed as a jazz violinist at festivals worldwide, including the Umbria Jazz Festival and North Sea Jazz Festival. Frigo also was a published poet and artist and played flugelhorn. He wrote and performed the 1969 Chicago Cubs fight song "Hey Hey, Holy Mackerel".

== Death ==
Frigo died of cancer in a Chicago hospital on July 4, 2007, at age 90.

== Personal life ==
Frigo was married twice and had one son with each wife. He was survived by his second wife, the former Brittney Browne, and one son, jazz drummer Richard "Rick" Frigo, who was born to his first wife, Dorothy Hachmeister. His other son, Derek John Frigo, who was born to Browne, was the lead guitarist for the rock band Enuff Z'nuff. Derek Frigo died of a drug overdose on May 28, 2004.

== Discography ==
=== As leader ===
Title	Release date	Notes	Label
Jump Presents Johnny Frigo	2009-06-02	JCD 12-33	Jump
Summer Me! Johnny Frigo Live at Battle Ground	2008-07-24	8021	Log Cabin
Johnny Frigo's DNA Exposed!	2002-02-05	19258	Arbors
Live at the Floating Jazz Festival	1999-08-24	358	Chiaroscuro
Debut of a Legend	1994-01-01	JD119	Chesky
Live from Studio A in New York City	1988-11-16	CD: JD001; SACD: SACD264	Chesky
I Love John Frigo...He Swings	1957-12-12	LP: MG20285; CD: Verve 145602	Mercury

=== As sideman ===
Title	Release date	Artist	Label
Solitaire Miles	2006-01-01	Solitaire Miles	Seraphic
Quiet Village: The Exotic Sounds of Martin Denny	2006-11-21	Martin Denny	Rev-Ola
Out of Nowhere	2006-01-01	Harold Fethe	Southport
Blue Suede Shoes	2006-02-28	Pee Wee King	Bear Family
Comes Love	2005-06	Elaine Dame	Blujazz
Simply...With Spirit	2005-05-10	Hanna Richardson & Phil Flanigan	Arbors
Barn Dance Favorites	2004-09-08	Pine Valley Cosmonauts	Bloodshot
Strange Weather	2004-05-04	Jack Donahue	PS Classics
Multitude of Stars	2004-06-08	Statesmen of Jazz	Arbors
Hot Club of 52nd Street	2004-05-25	Bucky Pizzarelli & Howard Alden	Chesky
Singin' Our Mind/Reflectin	2004-05-25	Chad Mitchell Trio	Collectors' Choice
The Slightly Irreverent/Typical American Boys	2003-10-07	Chad Mitchell Trio	Collectors' Choice
Legends	2003-07-01	Skitch Henderson & Bucky Pizzarelli	Arbors
Delicate Hour	2003-01-07	Patty Morabito	Lml Music
Pentimento	2002-06-04	Jessica Molaskey	PS Classics
Triple Scoop	2002-03-26	Monty Alexander	Concord
Romance Language	2002-02-14	Claudia Hommel	Maison Clobert
Title	2001-03-27	Buddy Greco	Polygram
RCA Country Legends	2001-09-25	Skeeter Davis	Buddah
Hoagy on My Mind	2001-07-17	Phillip Officer	Jerome
Now and Then	2001-01-01	Claiborne Cary	Original cast
Time, Seasons and the Moon	2000-09-19	Linda Tate	Southport
Little Things We Do Together	2000-01-01	Anne Pringle & Mark Burnell	Spectrum
Round About	1999-02-09	Audrey Morris	Fancy Faire
Royal Street	1997	Raul Reynoso	
Blame It On My Youth	1991	Holly Cole	Capitol Records
Love Words	1958	Ken Nordine	Dot

== Sources ==
When My Fiddle's in the Case: The Poetry and Paintings of Jazz Violinist Johnny Frigo. Lost Coast Press, 2004
