= Live at the Floating Jazz Festival =

Live at the Floating Jazz Festival may refer to:

- Live at the Floating Jazz Festival (Johnny Frigo album), 1999
- Live at the Floating Jazz Festival (Kenny Davern album), 2002
