= Summertime (Herb Alpert album) =

Studio album by Herb Alpert and the Tijuana Brass
- Released: 1971
- Studio: A&M (Hollywood, California)
- Genre: Jazz pop, easy listening
- Length: 26:20
- Label: A&M
- Producer: Herb Alpert, Jerry Moss

Herb Alpert and the Tijuana Brass chronology
| Greatest Hits (1970) | Summertime (1971) | You Smile - The Song Begins (1974) |

Summertime is a 1971 album by Herb Alpert & the Tijuana Brass. It consists of tracks assembled by Alpert's A&M Records label and was released during Alpert's hiatus from performing that occurred between the albums The Brass Are Comin' (1969) and You Smile – The Song Begins (1974).

The title track is a version of the George Gershwin aria from the 1935 opera Porgy and Bess, though influenced by the Miles Davis jazz interpretation of the song. It was released as a single in June 1971 with "Hurt So Bad" on the flip side, but it failed to chart.

"Jerusalem", written by Alpert, and "Strike Up the Band", another Gershwin tune, are tracks from a single that reached No. 74 on the Billboard Hot 100 in November 1970. "The Nicest Things Happen" was written by Tijuana Brass member Julius Wechter and his wife Cissy.

Cover versions of contemporary and recent hits found on the album include the Beatles' "Martha My Dear", Gordon Lightfoot's "If You Could Read My Mind", the Beach Boys' "Darlin'" and Little Anthony & the Imperials' "Hurt So Bad".

== Reception ==
Summertime received mixed contemporary reviews. An August 1971 review distributed by the Gannett News Service concluded: "Nothing exceptional in this album except some easy to take, summertime listening. Publishers release books that don't tax the mind at this time of year too." Writing in the Detroit Free Press in the same month, reviewer Bob Talbert had a more positive impression: "Alpert has adjusted, one hopes, to the fact that even the Tom Joneses and Johnny Cashes cool off and find a steady sales and popularity groove. This new Alpert Brass album will bring joy to his fans' hearts and gain him a legion of new ones."

In a modern-day review of the album for AllMusic, Richard S. Ginell lamented: "Clearly, Alpert wasn't quite ready to re-emerge full-blown into the performing world."

== Track listing ==
=== Side One ===
1. "Hurt So Bad" (Teddy Randazzo / Bobby Weinstein / Bobby Hart) – 2:20
2. "Jerusalem" (Herb Alpert) – 2:33
3. "Martha My Dear" (John Lennon / Paul McCartney) – 2:07
4. "If You Could Read My Mind" (Gordon Lightfoot) – 2:39
5. "Darlin'" (Brian Wilson / Mike Love) – 2:50

=== Side Two ===
1. "Summertime" (George Gershwin / DuBose Heyward, "adapted from ideas by" Ahmad Jamal, Gil Evans, Miles Davis, Lani Hall and Lambert, Hendricks & Ross) – 2:10
2. "The Nicest Things Happen" (Julius Wechter / Cissy Wechter) – 3:12
3. "Montezuma's Revenge" (Sol Lake) – 2:41
4. "Catch a Falling Star" (Paul Vance / Lee Pockriss) – 3:00
5. "Strike Up The Band" (George Gershwin / Ira Gershwin) – 2:33

== Charts ==
| Chart (1971) | Peak position |
|---|---|
| US Billboard Top LPs | 111 |
