= Passages of Time =

1993 single by Yōko Oginome

"Passages of Time (Hot New Version)"

Single by Yōko Oginome
- B-side: "Something About You (Hot New Version)"
- Released: November 21, 1993
- Recorded: 1993
- Genre: J-pop; R&B
- Label: Victor
- Songwriter(s): Narada Michael Walden; Walter Afanasieff; Jeffrey Cohen
- Producer(s): Rod Antoon

Yōko Oginome singles chronology
"Romance" (1993)	"Passages of Time (Hot New Version)" (1993)	"Mystery in Love" (1993)

Music video
- "Passages of Time (Hot New Version)" on YouTube

"Passages of Time (Hot New Version)" (パッセージ・オブ・タイム(HOT NEW VERSION), Passēji obu Taimu) is the 30th single by Japanese singer Yōko Oginome. Written by Narada Michael Walden, Walter Afanasieff, and Jeffrey Cohen, the single was released on November 21, 1993, by Victor Entertainment. Aside from being Oginome's first English-language single, it was her first single to not appear on Oricon's singles chart.

== Background and release ==
Originally featured in Oginome's 1988 English-language album Verge of Love, "Passages of Time" and "Something About You" were re-recorded with a new arrangement by Rod Antoon, who produced her 1994 album Scandal. The jacket cover was illustrated by Oginome herself.

== Track listing ==
All music is arranged by Rod Antoon.

No.	Title	Writer(s)	Length
1.	"Passages of Time (Hot New Version)" ((パッセージ・オブ・タイム(HOT NEW VERSION)))	Narada Michael Walden; Walter Afanasieff; Jeffrey Cohen
2.	"Something About You (Hot New Version)" ((サムシング・アバウト・ユー(HOT NEW VERSION)))	Walden; Afanasieff; Liz Jackson
3.	"Passages of Time (Hot New Version) (Original Karaoke)" ((パッセージ・オブ・タイム(HOT NEW VERSION)(オリジナル・カラオケ)))
4.	"Something About You (Hot New Version) (Original Karaoke)" ((サムシング・アバウト・ユー(HOT NEW VERSION)(オリジナル・カラオケ)))
