= History (Yōko Oginome album) =

Compilation album by Yōko Oginome
- Released: June 28, 1995
- Recorded: 1985–1994
- Genre: J-pop; kayōkyoku; dance-pop; R&B; children's
- Language: Japanese; English
- Label: Victor

Yōko Oginome chronology
Scandal (1994)	History (1995)	Chains (1997)

Singles from History
- 1. "Romance" Released: August 21, 1993; 2. "Koi no Hallelujah" Released: November 23, 1994

History (ヒストリー, Hisutorī) is a compilation album by Japanese singer Yōko Oginome. Released through Victor Entertainment on June 28, 1995, the two-disc album compiles Oginome's singles from 1985 to 1994, plus deep cuts and B-sides from her past releases.

== Track listing ==
Disc 1
No.	Title	Lyrics	Music	Arrangement	Length
1.	"Koi no Hallelujah" (Koi no Hareruya (恋のハレルヤ; "Love Hallelujah"))	Rei Nakanishi	Kunihiko Suzuki	Fumio Okui	3:38
2.	"Romance" (Romanse (ロマンセ))	Toyohisa Araki	Traditional	Edison	3:57
3.	"Romantic ni Aishite" (Romantikku ni Aishite (ロマンティックに愛して; "I Love You Romantically"))	Miyuki Asano	Juichi Morishige	Yukio Sugai; Kōichi Kaminaga; Ryujin Inoue	3:50
4.	"Steal Your Love"	Reo Mikami	Satoshi Hirose	Sugai; Kaminaga; R. Inoue	4:23
5.	"Coffee Rumba" (Kōhī Runba (コーヒー・ルンバ))	Seiji Nakazawa	José Manzo Perroni	Sugai; Kaminaga; R. Inoue	4:36
6.	"Nee" (Nē (ねえ; "Hey"))	Mikami	Tadashi Ishikawa	Sugai; Kaminaga; R. Inoue	4:38
7.	"Bijo to Yajū (Jungle Version)" ((美女と野獣 -Jungle Version-; "Beauty and the Beast"))	Masumi Kawamura	Toshinobu Kubota	Yōichirō "Wacky" Kakizaki; Kōji "Kitaroh" Nakamura	4:11
8.	"Shōnen no Hitomi ni..." ((少年の瞳に…; "In the Boy's Eyes...))	Keiko Asō	Project.K	Ken Yoshida	5:14
9.	"Gallery" (Gyararī (ギャラリー))	Yōsui Inoue	Y. Inoue	Atsushi Onozawa	4:$2
10.	"You're My Life" (Yua Mai Raifu (ユア・マイ・ライフ))	Masao Urino; James Christian	Christian	Tatsumi Yano	3:58
11.	"Dear (Cobalt no Kanata e)" (Diā ~Kobaruto no Kanata e~ (DEAR ~コバルトの彼方へ~; "Dear (Beyond Cobalt)"))	Takafumi Sotoma	Ryō Asuka	Nobuyuki Shimizu	4:08
12.	"Stardust Dream" (Sutādasuto Dorīmu (スターダスト・ドリーム))	Reiji Asō	Yoshimasa Inoue	Hiroshi Shinkawa	3:33
13.	"Stranger Tonight" (Sutorenjā Tunaito (ストレンジャーtonight))	Urino	Nobody	Ryō Yonemitsu	4:06
14.	"Kitakaze no Carol" (Kitakaze no Kyaroru (北風のキャロル; "North Wind Carol"))	Urino	Kyōhei Tsutsumi	Shinkawa	3:57
15.	"Sayonara no Kajitsutachi" ((さよならの果実たち; "Goodbye Fruits"))	Urino	Tsutsumi	Satoshi Takebe	3:46
16.	"Wangan Taiyōzoku" ((湾岸太陽族; "Bayshore Route Sun Tribe"))	Urino	Minoru Yamazaki	Akira Nishihira	3:41
17.	"Roppongi Junjōha" ((六本木純情派; "Roppongi Pure-Heart Clique"))	Urino	Akihiro Yoshimi	Shinkawa	3:31
18.	"Dance Beat wa Yoake made" (Dansu Bīto wa Yoake made (Dance Beatは夜明けまで; "Dance Beat Until Dawn"))	Hiromi Mori	Nobody	Nishihira	3:43
19.	"Dancing Hero (Eat You Up)" (Danshingu Hīrō (Īto Yū Appu) (ダンシング・ヒーロー (Eat You Up)))	Hitoshi Shinohara	Angeline Kyte; Anthony Baker	Kōji Makaino	3:50
Total length:					77:33

Disc 2
No.	Title	Lyrics	Music	Arrangement	Length
1.	"Under the Boardwalk (New Vocal Live Mix)" (Andā za Bōdowōku (アンダー・ザ・ボードウォーク -New Vocal Live Mix-))	Arthur Resnick; Kenny Young; Kazuko Sakata	Resnick; Young	Yano	3:51
2.	"Postcard from Paris"	Preston Glass	Glass	Narada Michael Walden	5:50
3.	"This Could Be the Night"	Walden; Walter Afanasieff; Liz Jackson	Walden; Afanasieff; Jackson	Walden	4:04
4.	"Kinō Yori Kagayaite (New Vocal Live Mix)" ((昨日より輝いて -New Vocal Live Mix-; "Shining From Yesterday"))	Panta	Panta	Jun Satō	4:42
5.	"Nonstop Dancer"	Masumi Kawamura	Tetsuya Komuro	Nobuyuki Shimizu	4:35
6.	"Beat Goes On"	Kenzō Saeki	Ginji Itō	Ken Yoshida	3:44
7.	"You're My Angel"	YOKO	YOKO	Soichi Terada	4:08
8.	"Nudist"	YOKO	Joey Carbone; Dennis Belfield	Sugai; Kaminaga; R. Inoue	3:56
9.	"Moonlight Blue"	Yumi Yoshimoto	Yoshimitsu Ōba	Shōhei Narabe	4:49
10.	"Shiawase wa Sunadokei no Yō ni" ((幸せは砂時計のように; "Happiness Is Like an Hourglass"))	Neko Oikawa	Nao Asada	Nittoku Inoue	3:24
11.	"Heaven"	Oikawa	Manabu Kamoi	N. Inoue	3:13
12.	"Tasogare no Neighborhood" (Tasogare no Neibāfūdo (黄昏のネイバーフッド; "Twilight Neighborhood"))	Kawamura	Kiyonori Matsuo	Ryōmei Shirai	3:21
13.	"Machikirenai Hitomi" ((待ちきれない瞳; "Eyes I Can't Wait For"))	Natsumi Tadano	Yoshimitsu Ōba	Shingo Kobayashi	3:#4
14.	"Karuizawa Connexion" (Karuizawa Konekushon (軽井沢コネクション))	Urino	Tsutsumi	Shirō Sagisu	3:46
15.	"Mayonaka no Stranger" (Mayonaka no Sutorenjā (真夜中のストレンジャー; "Midnight Stranger"))	Reiko Yukawa	Nobody	Shinkawa	3:51
16.	"Last Dance wa Watashi ni" (Rasuto Dansu wa Watashi ni (ラストダンスは私に; "The Last Dance for Me"))	Takako Shirai	Kaori Okui	Sugai; Kaminaga; R. Inoue	4:33
17.	"246 Planet Girls" (Tsū Fō Shikkusu Puranetto Gāruzu (246プラネット・ガールズ))	Urino	Tsutsumi	Shinkawa	4:39
18.	"Morning Call" (Mōningu Kōru (モーニング・コール))	Mayumi Hara	Masayuki Kuzuguchi	N. Inoue; Hitoshi Haba	4:34
19.	"Yumemiru Planet" (Yumemiru Puranetto (夢見るPLANET; "The Dreaming Planet"))	Yumi Yoshimoto	Asada	Sagisu	3:32
Total length:					78:13
