= At the Algonquin =

Live album by Dave Frishberg and Jessica Molaskey
- Released: August 14, 2012
- Recorded: March 26, 2011
- Venue: Algonquin Hotel's Oak Room
- Genre: Vocal jazz
- Length: 51:35
- Producer: Mat Domber; Rachel Domber; Jessica Molaskey

Jessica Molaskey chronology
A Kiss to Build a Dream On (2008)	At the Algonquin (2012)

At the Algonquin is a 2012 live jazz album by Dave Frishberg and Jessica Molaskey, featuring songs written by Frishberg. It was recorded from a March 2011 show at the historic Algonquin Hotel's Oak Room.

It was the last recorded performance at the venue before it closed in early 2012 after thirty-two years. Molaskey made her debut at the venue in 2005.

== Reception ==
Professional ratings
Review scores
Source	Rating
AllMusic	4/5 stars

All About Jazz lists it as a recommended album.

AllMusic critic Ken Dryden rated the album four stars, commenting "Frishberg and Molaskey make quite a team, with a playful attitude and rapport that makes it seem like they've been a team for years"

Christopher Louden of the JazzTimes lamented the loss of the venue, but said of the artists that "Jessica Molaskey is best known for swapping quips with husband John Pizzarelli, pianist and vocalist Dave Frishberg has been her frequent sparring partner over the years, and their silk-and-sandpaper rapport is every bit as engaging."

Stephen Holden reviewed the original performance and source material for the New York Times, writing "the level of craftsmanship in Mr. Frishberg’s songs is equaled only by that of Stephen Sondheim. Every phrase is chiseled, each word sealed into place, the better to allow that "little voice that whispers crystal clear” to have its say." Of Molaskey's performance, "[she's] as sympathetic an interpreter of his work as Blossom Dearie, with whom he used to perform."

== Track listing ==
All tracks are written by Dave Frishberg, unless noted.

No.	Title	Length
1.	"Who's on First?"	3:19
2.	"Slappin' the Cakes on Me"	2:42
3.	"I'm Hip" (Robert Dorough, Dave Frishberg)	3:53
4.	"My Attorney Bernie"	4:14
5.	"Introduction for Will You Die?" (Dave Frishberg, Jessica Molaskey)	1:16
6.	"Will You Die?"	3:32
7.	"Excuse Me for Living"	4:50
8.	"I Want to Be a Sideman"	3:19
9.	"Heart's Desire" (Alan Broadbent, Dave Frishberg)	3:43
10.	"Introduction for Long Daddy Green"	0:45
11.	"Long Daddy Green" (Blossom Dearie, Dave Frishberg)	4:42
12.	"My New Celebrity is You" (Dave Frishberg, Johnny Mercer)	4:26
13.	"Do You Miss New York?"	3:59
14.	"Can't Take You Nowhere" (Al Cohn, Dave Frishberg, Tiny Kahn)	3:18
15.	"Introduction for Listen Here"	0:16
16.	"Listen Here"	3:21

== Personnel ==
=== Musicians ===
- Dave Frishberg – composer, piano, primary artist, producer, vocals
- Jessica Molaskey – primary artist, producer, vocals

=== Support ===
- Dave Frishberg – liner notes
- Luke Melton – cover design
- Bill Moss – engineer, mastering, mixing
