= Jazz Bakery =

Jazz venue in Los Angeles, USA

Coordinates: 34.103957°N 118.437110°W

- Interactive map of Jazz Bakery
- Location: Los Angeles, California
- Owner: Ruth Price
- Seating type: open seating
- Type: Nightclub
- Event: Jazz

Construction
- Opened: 1992

Website
- www.jazzbakery.org

The Jazz Bakery is a not-for-profit arts presenter in Los Angeles that has showcased many of the world's most acclaimed jazz artists since it was founded by jazz vocalist Ruth Price in 1992.

== History ==
Price, President & Artistic Director of the Jazz Bakery, is a jazz singer from Philadelphia who toured with bassist/composer Charles Mingus and recorded with drummer Shelly Manne and guitarist Johnny Smith. She created the Jazz Bakery after booking several clubs and restaurants around Los Angeles. In its first incarnation the Jazz Bakery opened in photographer Jim Britt's studio located in the historic Helms Bakery complex, with concerts held on weekends. In 1994, the organization opened a dedicated venue in the Helms Bakery building itself and started presenting music seven nights a week in a semi-formal setting without interruptions for drink or food service. A rectangular theater with a café in the lobby, the venue booked Southern California jazz musicians and touring artists from New York City and Europe.

Since its founding the venue has hosted hundreds of jazz stars, including Benny Carter, Red Mitchell, Roger Kellaway, McCoy Tyner, Kevin Eubanks, Dave Holland, Peter Erskine, Johnny Griffin, George Coleman, Paul Bley, Lee Konitz, Fred Hersch, Terence Blanchard, Brad Mehldau, Charlie Haden, Dianne Reeves, Art Farmer, Roy Haynes, Cedar Walton, Randy Weston, George Cables, Joe Henderson, Bobby Hutcherson, James Moody, The Heath Brothers, John Larkin, Marian McPartland, Teddy Edwards, Harold Land, Sonny Fortune, Yusef Lateef, Ahmad Jamal, Jimmy Rowles, Alan Broadbent, Blossom Dearie, Bud Shank, Pete Christlieb, Ricky Woodard, Billy Harper, Ernie Watts, Billy Childs, Gordon Goodwin, Tomasz Stańko, Elvin Jones, Adam Rudolph, Louis Bellson, Billy Higgins, Mose Allison, Benny Golson, Myra Melford, Antonio Sánchez (drummer), Kurt Rosenwinkel, Joe Lovano, Mark Murphy (singer), Abbey Lincoln, Nicholas Payton, Ernie Andrews, Frank Morgan (musician), Cecil Taylor, Cyrus Chestnut, Dafnis Prieto, Avishai Cohen (bassist), Don Byron, and Eric Reed (musician).

Upon losing its lease in the Helms Bakery Building in 2009, the Jazz Bakery has presented an ongoing 'Movable Feast' concert series at venues around Los Angeles while looking for a permanent new residence. In late 2010 the Annenberg Foundation awarded the Jazz Bakery a $2 million grant as capital campaign seed money for a new building. In January 2012, Culver City, California transferred a parcel at 9814 Washington Blvd. next to the Kirk Douglas Theatre in the downtown arts district as a site for a new building, which is being designed by architect Frank Gehry. The new Jazz Bakery is slated to present year-round performances and educational programs in two state-of-the-art theaters, with an art gallery, virtual museum and cafe/bar, a plan for which the organization is still raising funds. The Jazz Bakery also announced in 2012 that violinist Jeff Gauthier, who founded and runs Cryptogramophone Records and helped launch the Angel City Jazz Festival, is joining the organization as executive director. The Jazz Bakery is now co-producing the Angel City Jazz Festival.

== Recordings ==
More than a dozen albums have been recorded at the Jazz Bakery.

=== Jazz Bakery discography ===
- Sonny Craver, Live at the Jazz Bakery (1993)
- Karen Gallinger, Live at the Jazz Bakery (1994)
- Claude Williamson, Live at the Jazz Bakery (1995)
- Yusef Lateef and Adam Rudolph, The World at Peace (YAL/Meta, 1997)[2CD]
- Lee Konitz / Brad Mehldau / Charlie Haden, Alone Together (Blue Note, 1997)
- Jan Lundgren / Chuck Berghofer / Joe LaBarbera, Cooking at the Jazz Bakery (1998)
- Lee Konitz, Another Shade of Blue (Blue Note, 1999)
- Roger Kellaway / Dick Hyman, Two Pianos at The Jazz Bakery (1999)
- Jon Mayer, Rip Van Winkel: Live at the Jazz Bakery (1999)
- David Friesen / Denny Zeitlin, Live at the Jazz Bakery (1999)
- Dave Frishberg and Bob Dorough, Who's on First? (Blue Note, 2000)
- Robert Clary, Sings at the Jazz Bakery (2000)
- Frank Potenza, 3 Guitars: Live at the Jazz Bakery (2002)
- Gerald Wiggins, Gerry Wiggins and Friends: Celebrating Wig’s 80th at the Jazz Bakery (2004)
- Sam Rivers, Celebration (Posi-Tone, 2004)
- Brian Swartz, Live at the Jazz Bakery (2005)
- Dave Frishberg, Retromania: At the Jazz Bakery (2006)
- Sara Gazarek, Live at the Jazz Bakery (2006)
- Yvette Summers, Live at the Jazz Bakery (2007)
- Ernie Watts, To the Point: Live at the Jazz Bakery (Flying Dolphin, 2008)
- John Hicks / Frank Morgan, Twogether (2010)
- Jan Lundgren / Chuck Berghofer / Joe LaBarbera, Together Again…At the Jazz Bakery (2011)
- Jason Smith, Tipping Point: Live at the Jazz Bakery (2012)

== In popular culture ==
The former Jazz Bakery location at Helms Bakery served as a literary setting in two works of fiction: Bird Lives! (1999), a mystery novel by Bill Moody, and There Will Never Be Another You (2007) by Carolyn See.

== See also ==
- List of jazz clubs
