= Summer Me! Johnny Frigo Live at Battle Ground =

Live album by Johnny Frigo
- Released: July 24, 2008
- Recorded: June 30, 1985 to June 28, 1997
- Venue: Indiana Fiddlers' Gathering
- Genre: Jazz, swing
- Length: 77:18
- Label: Log Cabin
- Producer: Dave Samuelson

Johnny Frigo chronology
| Johnny Frigo's DNA Exposed! | Summer Me! Johnny Frigo Live at Battle Ground |

Summer Me! Johnny Frigo Live at Battle Ground is a 2008 compilation by jazz violinist Johnny Frigo from his appearances at the Indiana Fiddlers' Gathering between 1985 and 1997. The album was released posthumously. A hidden track, an unaccompanied violin solo of "Estrellita" dating from June 30, 1985, closes the album.

== Track listing ==
1. Quando, Quando, Quando
2. The Song Is You
3. Polka Dots and Moonbeams
4. Czardas
5. Pennies from Heaven
6. Nuages
7. Summer Me, Winter Me
8. Medley: America the Beautiful/Strike Up the Band
9. Summertime
10. Pick Yourself Up
11. Here's That Rainy Day
12. I'll Remember April
13. Get Happy
14. In a Sentimental Mood
15. (Back Home in) Indiana
16. Estrellita (unlisted hidden track)

== Personnel ==
- Johnny Frigo – violin
- Don Stiernberg – mandolin
- John Parrott – guitar
- Greg Cahill – banjo
- Jim Cox – double bass
