= Out of Nowhere =

Out of Nowhere may refer to:

== Film and TV ==
- Out of Nowhere (2000 film), a documentary by Fintan Connolly

== Music ==
- Out of Nowhere (Iranian Band)
- Out of Nowhere (Salonen), classical composition and album by Esa-Pekka Salonen
- Out of Nowhere (Australian band)

=== Albums ===
- Out of Nowhere (Chet Baker album)
- Out of Nowhere (James Carter album)
- Out of Nowhere (Sonny Criss album)
- Out of Nowhere (Don Ellis album)
- Out of Nowhere (Harold Fethe album)
- Out of Nowhere (Lee Konitz and Paul Bley album)
- Out of Nowhere (Vinnie Moore album)
- Out Of Nowhere (Jimi Tenor album), 2000 solo album by Jimi Tenor
- Out of Nowhere (Borghesia album), by Borghesia

=== Songs ===
- "Out of Nowhere" (Johnny Green song)
- "Out of Nowhere" (Gloria Estefan song)
- "Out of Nowhere", a song by Nikki Yanofsky on her 2014 album Little Secret

== See also ==
- From Out of Nowhere (disambiguation)
