= Coney Island (album) =

Studio album by Herb Alpert and The T.J.B.
- Released: Spring 1975
- Studio: Gold Star (Hollywood, California); A&M (Hollywood, California)
- Genre: Jazz pop, Easy Listening
- Length: 40:39
- Label: A&M
- Producer: Herb Alpert

Herb Alpert and The T.J.B. chronology
You Smile – The Song Begins (1974)	Coney Island (1975)	Just You And Me (1976)

Coney Island is a 1975 studio album by Herb Alpert & The Tijuana Brass, the second release that was billed as "Herb Alpert & The T.J.B." It followed the 1974 release of You Smile – The Song Begins. Both albums reflected personnel changes from the Brass that was disbanded after 1969's The Brass Are Comin'.

== The T.J.B. ==
According to AllMusic, the album was "a brave, nearly complete departure from the old Tijuana Brass, where the jazzers were given carte blanche and the rhythm section encouraged to do more complex things."

Legendary audio engineer Larry Levine, who engineered nearly all of the Tijuana Brass albums including Coney Island, observed that the album contained more off-beat or original tracks, that cast the band in a new and more adventurous light. He noted in particular that "'Carmine', 'Vento Bravo' and Chick Corea's 'Señor Mouse' allow the band to stretch more than the TJB of old, and emphasizing more improvisation by the group members."

In September 1974, music from Coney Island was featured in a television special with Jim Henson's Muppets. Alpert & The T.J.B. also made an appearance to promote the album on the late night musical variety series "Midnight Special." The broadcast was essentially an A&M Records special, with additional appearances by label artists Captain & Tennille, Billy Preston, and Supertramp.

== Reception ==
Coney Island spent ten weeks on the Billboard Top LPs & Tape chart, reaching number 88 for the week ending June 14, 1975. It spent eight weeks on the Billboard Top 50 Easy Listening chart, where it peaked at number 19.

== Personnel ==
- Herb Alpert: trumpet
- Bob Edmondson: trombone
- Bob Findley: trumpet
- Dave Frishberg: piano
- Julius Wechter: marimba
- Vince Charles: steel drum/percussion
- Lani Hall: vocals
- Steve Schaeffer: drums
- Peter Woodford: guitar
- Orlando "Papito" Hernandez: bass

== Track listing ==
Track	Title	Composers	Time
1	"Coney Island"	Julius Wechter	2:13
2	"I Have Dreamed"	Oscar Hammerstein II - Richard Rodgers	2:35
3	"Señor Mouse "	Chick Corea	4:28
4	"Mickey”	Michael Colombier	4:02
5	"Sweet Georgia Brown"	Ben Bernie, Kenneth Casey, Maceo Pinkard	2:29
6	"Ratatouille (Rata Too Ee)”	Clovis Mello, Moacir Santos	3:07
7	"Catfish”	Bob Findley	2:37
8	"This Masquerade”	Leon Russell	2:18
9	"Carmine”	Herb Alpert	5:33
10	"The Crave”	Jelly Roll Morton	1:52
11	"Vento Bravo”	Edu Lobo	3:47
12	"I Belong”	Goran Fristorp, Hal David	5:01
