= Who's on First? (disambiguation) =

Who's on First? is a comedy routine made famous by Abbott and Costello.

Who's on First? may also refer to:

- Who's on First (novel), a 1980 American spy thriller written by William F. Buckley Jr.
- Who's on First? (album), a live 2000 vocal album by the songwriters Bob Dorough and Dave Frishberg
- "Who's on First", an episode of Voltran
