= A Kiss to Build a Dream On (album) =

Studio album by Jessica Molaskey
- Released: September 2, 2008
- Genre: Vocal jazz
- Length: 1:01:05
- Label: Arbors

Jessica Molaskey chronology
Sitting in Limbo (2007)	A Kiss to Build a Dream On (2008)	At the Algonquin (2012)

A Kiss to Build a Dream On is a 2008 studio album by Jessica Molaskey, and her first with the pure jazz Arbors label. It’s named for the song composed by Bert Kalmar, Harry Ruby and Oscar Hammerstein II in 1935, and recorded by Louis Armstrong in 1951.

It pays tribute to, as Molaskey refers to in the liner notes "various sized pieces of wood with strings attached." It features her husband John Pizzarelli, Bucky Pizzarelli, Martin Pizzarelli, and Aaron Weinstein in this vein.

Other tracks include show tunes, old standards, and two originals written by Molaskey and John Pizzarelli.

== Reception ==
Professional ratings
Review scores
Source	Rating
AllMusic	4.5/5 stars

The album is among the highest rated of her works on AllMusic with four and a half stars. Music critic Ken Dryden concluded that "Molaskey will warm an audience of any size with this superb release."

Christopher Loudon from the JazzTimes compared the album favorably to her Broadway performances, saying "a singing actress who can fully transport her stage skills to the recording studio, transforming each selection into a multihued mini-play."

Stephen Holden wrote for the New York Times the "album of happy songs ... is so buoyant it eliminates any hint of Sunday school sermonizing from the concept of sweetness and light."

Writing for Playbill, Steven Suskin praised the "canny song selection, impeccable musical instincts, and an unconditional love for the material."

== Track listing ==
No.	Title	Writer(s)	Length
1.	"Happy Habit"	Dorothy Fields; Arthur Schwartz	3:46
2.	"Medley: You Must Have Been a Beautiful Baby/Baby Face"	Harry Akst; Benny Davis; Johnny Mercer; Harry Warren	4:20
3.	"Hello Sunshine Hello"	Jack Murray; Charles Tobias	3:28
4.	"A Kiss to Build a Dream On"	Oscar Hammerstein II; Bert Kalmar; Harry Ruby	4:11
5.	"Everybody Loves Louis"	Stephen Sondheim	3:17
6.	"Tea for Two"	Irving Caesar; Vincent Youmans	4:09
7.	"Take Me to You"	Jessica Molaskey; John Pizzarelli	3:41
8.	"Breezin' Along With the Breeze"	Haven Gillespie; Seymour Simons; Richard A. Whiting	4:12
9.	"Isn't he Something"	Stephen Sondheim	3:47
10.	"Hiding in Plain Sight"	Jessica Molaskey; John Pizzarelli	3:46
11.	"I'm Looking Over a Four Leaf Clover"	Mort Dixon; Harry Woods	3:07
12.	"You're Nobody till Somebody Loves You"	Larry Stock	5:51
13.	"Ain't Misbehavin'"	Harry Brooks; Andy Razaf; Fats Waller	5:53
14.	"Bye Bye Blues"	Dave Bennett; Chauncey Gray; Fred Hamm; Bert Lown	4:49
15.	"Heart's Desire"	Alan Broadbent; Dave Frishberg	2:48

== Personnel ==
- Jessica Molaskey – vocals
- John Pizzarelli – guitar, vocal duets (track 6, 10)
- Bucky Pizzarelli – guitar
- Aaron Weinstein – violin
- Larry Fuller – piano (track 10)
- Martin Pizzarelli – bass
