= You Smile – The Song Begins =

Studio album by Herb Alpert and the T.J.B
- Released: May 1974
- Recorded: 1974
- Studios: A&M (Hollywood, California); Gold Star (Hollywood, California)
- Genres: Jazz pop, Easy Listening
- Length: 39:39
- Label: A&M SP 3620

Herb Alpert chronology
Summertime (1971)	You Smile – The Song Begins (1974)	Coney Island (1975)

You Smile – The Song Begins is a 1974 studio album by Herb Alpert & the Tijuana Brass, though billed as "Herb Alpert and the T.J.B." It was the group's first regular studio album since 1969's The Brass Are Comin'. The songs were arranged by Alpert, with "strings and things" on one track (according to the liner notes) arranged by Quincy Jones.

== Reception ==
The album spent eleven weeks on the Billboard Top LPs & Tape chart, reaching number 66 for the week ending June 22, 1974. Two singles from the album charted on the Billboard Hot 100: "Fox Hunt", which reached No. 84 in June 1974, and "Last Tango in Paris", the theme song of the film by the same name, which had peaked at No. 77 in April of the previous year.

In his review of the album for Allmusic, Richard S. Ginell wrote that after his four-year break from music, Alpert "...returned to the studio creatively refreshed, his trumpet sounding more soulful and thoughtful, his ears attuned more than ever to jazz...But Alpert was definitely still in a pensive mood, and his evocative self-penned title track and choice of tunes like 'Alone Again (Naturally)' and 'Save the Sunlight' reinforce the LP's mellow, '70s contemporary pop atmosphere. Even the upbeat remake of the TJB's 'Up Cherry Street' is filtered through a phase-shifted gauze, a wistful rose-colored vision of the past."

You Smile – The Song Begins was chosen as one of Billboard magazine's "Top Album Picks" upon its release in May 1974. The magazine commented that "Herb Alpert is finally back with an LP and for his many fans this set will prove the wait has been worthwhile...Nothing is overstated here, as Alpert gets his point across without wasting a single note."

== Track listing ==
1. "Fox Hunt" (Herb Alpert) – 2:38
2. "Legend of the One-Eyed Sailor" (Chuck Mangione) – 4:52
3. "I Can't Go on Living, Baby, Without You" (Jerry Riopelle, Nino Tempo) – 2:48
4. "I Might Frighten Her Away" (Burt Bacharach, Hal David) – 4:11
5. "You Smile – The Song Begins" (Alpert) – 3:21
6. "Up Cherry Street" (Julius Wechter) – 2:32
7. "Promises, Promises" (Bacharach, David) – 2:31
8. "Save the Sunlight" (Buddy Buie, James B. Cobb Jr., Gerald Douglas Lee) – 3:50
9. "Dida" (Joan Baez) – 3:17
10. "Alone Again (Naturally)" (Gilbert O'Sullivan) – 2:29
11. "Last Tango in Paris" (Gato Barbieri) – 2:50
12. "A Song for Herb" (Roger Nichols) – 4:20

== Personnel ==
- Herb Alpert – trumpet, leader
- Lani Hall – vocals
- Bob Edmondson – trombone
- Bob Findley – trumpet
- Dave Frishberg – piano
- Julius Wechter – marimba
- Vince Charles – steel drum, percussion
- Nick Ceroli – drums
- John Pisano – guitar
- Ernie McDaniels – double bass
- Pete Jolly – accordion
- Quincy Jones – arranger
