= Live from Studio A in New York City =

Live album by Johnny Frigo
- Released: 1988
- Recorded: November 1988
- Genre: Swing
- Length: 55:30
- Label: Chesky
- Producer: David Chesky, Norman Chesky

Johnny Frigo chronology
| I Love John Frigo...He Swings | Live from Studio A in New York City (1988) | Debut of a Legend (1994) |

Live from Studio A in New York City is an album by violinist Johnny Frigo. It was his second album as leader and came over 30 years after his debut. This was also the first album recorded by Chesky Records.

== Recording and music ==
The album was recorded in November 1988. In addition to Frigo, the musicians were guitarists Bucky Pizzarelli and John Pizzarelli, bassists Ron Carter and Michael Moore (one of whom played on each track), and drummer Butch Miles. The material is standards.

== Release and reception ==
Professional ratings
Review scores
| Source | Rating |
|---|---|
| AllMusic | 4/5 stars |
| The Penguin Guide to Jazz | 3.5/4 stars |

Live from Studio A in New York City was released by Chesky Records and was their first issue. The Penguin Guide to Jazz described it as "a strong set, with a great band, though Miles is typically showy". The AllMusic reviewer wrote that Frigo "was immediately considered one of the top swing-based violinists".

== Track listing ==
1. Pick Yourself Up and Start All Over Again (3:05)
2. Do Nothing Till You Hear from Me (6:48)
3. Detour Ahead (4:21)
4. Just Friends (3:23)
5. Estrellita (2:34)
6. Stompin' at the Savoy (4:05)
7. Early Autumn (5:03)
8. You Stepped Out of a Dream (3:20)
9. In a Sentimental Mood (5:16)
10. Song Is You (4:07)
11. I'm Through with Love (4:06)
12. Summer Me, Winter Me (2:36)
13. Tangerine (3:19)
14. I'll Never Be the Same (3:27)

== Personnel ==
- Johnny Frigo – violin
- Bucky Pizzarelli – guitar
- John Pizzarelli – guitar
- Ron Carter – double bass
- Michael Moore – double bass
- Butch Miles – drums
