= A Good Day (Jessica Molaskey album) =

Studio album by Jessica Molaskey
- Released: May 20, 2003
- Genre: Swing
- Label: PS Classics
- Producer: Tommy Krasker; John Pizzarelli

Jessica Molaskey chronology
Pentimento (2002)	A Good Day (2003)	Make Believe (2004)

Professional ratings
Review scores
Source	Rating
AllMusic	4.5/5 stars

A Good Day is an album by singer Jessica Molaskey. She is accompanied by her husband John Pizzarelli (a jazz guitarist); her father-in-law, Bucky Pizzarelli, also played guitar on this recording.

== Track listing ==
No.	Title	Length
1.	"All the Cats Join In"	4:15
2.	"Everything Is Moving Too Fast"	2:51
3.	"Somebody Loves Me"	3:44
4.	"How Come You Ain't Got Me?"	2:40
5.	"Small World"	4:11
6.	"It's a Good Day"	2:30
7.	"I Love the Way You're Breaking My Heart"	2:47
8.	"I Don't Know Enough About You"	3:32
9.	"Adam & Eve"	2:49
10.	"Girl With His Smile and My Eyes"	3:04
11.	"It's the Bluest Kind of Blues"	5:28
12.	"I Wouldn't Trade You"	2:42
13.	"Side by Side"	3:10
14.	"Lifetime or Two"	2:47

== Personnel ==
- Jessica Molaskey – Vocals
- John Pizzarelli – guitar, vocals, arrangements
- Martin Pizzarelli – double-bass
- Tony Tedesco – drums
- Ray Kennedy – piano
- Kenny Berger – bass clarinet
- Don Sebesky – arrangements
- Andy Fusco – clarinet
- Tony Kadleck – trumpet
- Larry Goldings – organ
- Ken Peplowski – clarinet
- Bucky Pizzarelli – guitars
