= B-Robo Kabutack =

Television series

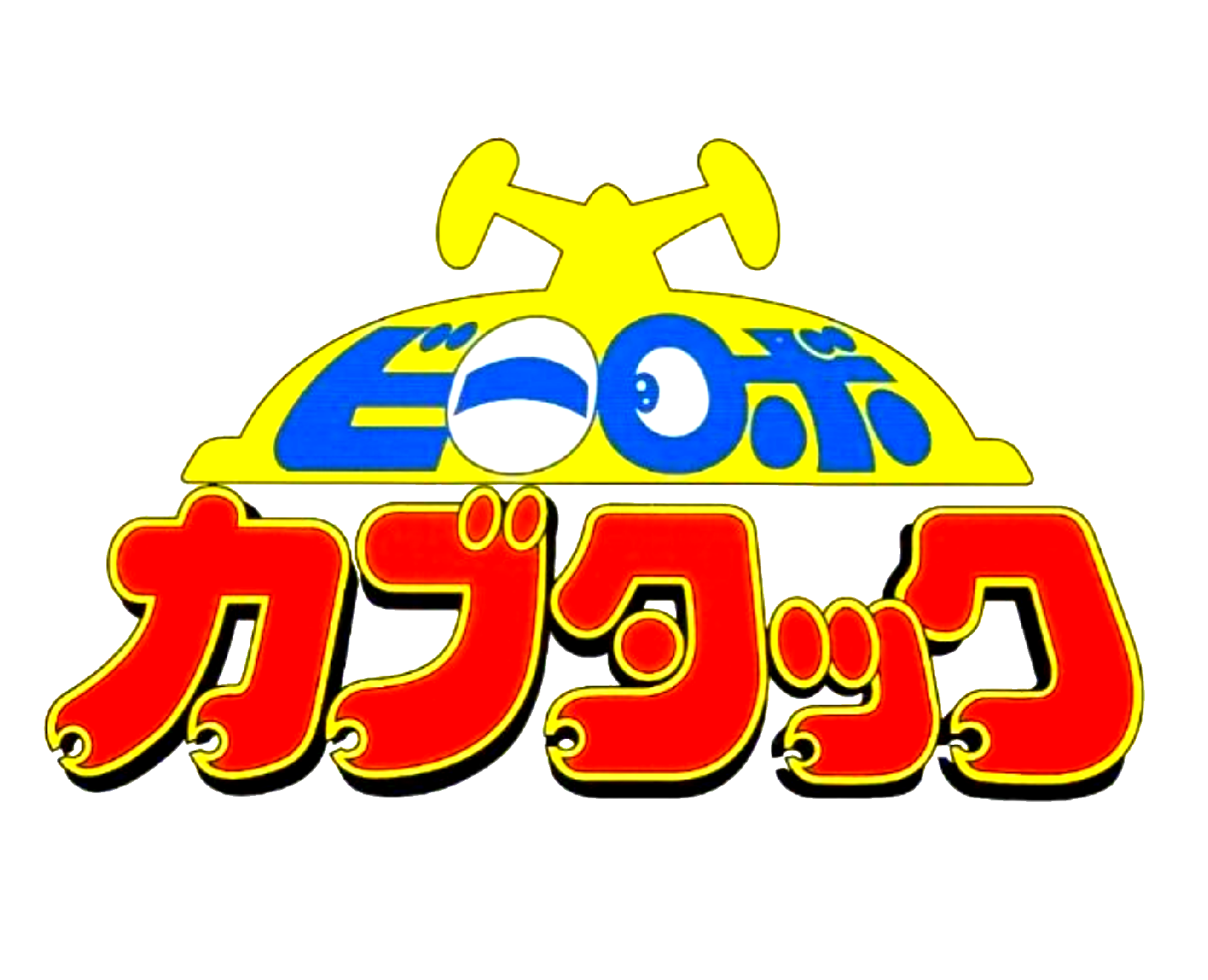
- Genre: Tokusatsu; Superhero fiction Sci-fi comedy
- Created by: Saburō Yatsude
- Based on: Robocon by Shotaro Ishinomori
- Developed by: Takashi Yamada
- Directed by: Taro Sakamoto
- Starring: Kazuki Futami; Miyabi Kimura; Yuka Koide; Yasushi Ishii; Aki Mukai; Sachiko Kokubu; Hiromitsu Suzuki; Kageki Shimoda
- Voices of: Takeshi Kusao; Daiki Nakamura; Hikari Tachibana; Dai Matsumoto; Hisao Egawa; Chafurin; Daisuke Gōri
- Country of origin: Japan
- No. of episodes: 52

Production
- Running time: 25 minutes
- Production companies: Toei Company; Asatsu-DK

Original release
- Network: TV Asahi (ANN)
- Release: February 23, 1997 – March 1, 1998

Related
- B-Fighter Kabuto; Tetsuwan Tantei Robotack

B-Robo Kabutack (ビーロボカブタック, Bī Robo Kabutakku) is a Japanese television series and is the 16th series as part of Toei's Metal Hero Series franchise of tokusatsu programs. It aired from February 23, 1997, to March 1, 1998. It is the first of shows made by Toei in the Metal Hero Series that was aimed at children. It aired alongside Denji Sentai Megaranger on TV Asahi. Kabutack bears some similarities with Robocon, as well as other Toei series, particularly in characters and themes.

== Plot ==
Dr. Torahiko Kouenji is a genius who dug out the ancient writings from the oldest layer of the earth. He translated the writings and learned the existence of 13 "Star Pieces" (スターピース, Sutā Pīsu) that had been hidden across the planet. If one should obtain all the Star Pieces, any wish could be granted. To that end, Dr. Kouenji built search robots, known as "B-Robots", to find the Star Pieces. However, a trio of such robots, led by Cobrander, were activated without their sleep-education program being completed and thus started to commit bad deeds across the town.

Fortunately, a team, composed of three "good" B-Robots, had completed the whole course of sleep-learning, and befriended Yuzuru Kouenji, Dr. Kouenji's grandson. With Yuzuru, and his friends Sayuri Mitaka and Kuranosuke Kichijouji, the three good B-Robots and the gang begin their search of the "Star Pieces" while overcoming the misdeeds of the three "bad" B-Robots.

== Characters ==
=== B-Robots ===
Short for "Bio Elementary Electronic & Transform Locomotive Eexivision Robot", the B-Robots are able to transform into the fighting Super Mode. However, the time limit the mode longs on depends on the B-Robo as the earlier models have shorter timespans compared to the later ones.

- No. 1 Kabutack (カブタック, Kabutakku): The first B-Robot and the prototype model, built with a rhinoceros beetle-like appearance and a biochip based on the insect. He usually ends his sentences with "kabu". Being the prototype, his Super Mode can only last for 3 minutes. In Super Mode, he wields a weapon called Bilit Stick (ビリットスティック, Biritto Sutikku), which is transformed from his helmet in "normal mode". To transform into Super Mode, he needs Yuzuru's Friendship Commander (友情コマンダー, Yūjō Komandā), a comm-link-like device.
  - Buttobi Kabutack (ブットビカブタック, Buttobi Kabutakku): Kabutack's flight form which combined with Tobimasky via Buttobi Formation (ブットビフォーメーション, Buttobi Fōmēshon).
  - Drillut Kabutack (ドリルットカブタック, Dorirutto Kabutakku): Kabutack's digging form formed by combining Kabutack with a set of upgrades known as Drillut Parts (ドリルットパーツ, Dorirutto Pātsu). In Super Mode, Kabutack is equipped with four sets of wheels and a drill in his hand and can use the Kabutack Final Crush (カブタックファイナルクラッシュ, Kabutakku Fainaru Kurasshu) attack.
  - Zabut Kabutack (ザブットカブタック, Zabutto Kabutakku): Kabutack's diving form formed by combining Kabutack with another set of upgrades known as Zabut Parts (ザブットパーツ, Zabutto Pātsu). In Super Mode, Kabutack is equipped with propellers on his feet, fins on his arms and a torpedo-launcher in his hand, he can also fire a torpedo called Bilit Missile (ビリットミサイル, Biritto Misairu).
- No. 2 Kuwagiro (クワジーロ, Kuwajīro): A stag beetle-type robot with a stag beetle biochip. His Super Mode can last for 5 minutes. In Super Mode, he wields a weapon called the Hasamic Cutter (ハサミックカッター, Hasamikku Kattā). To transform into Super Mode, he needs Kuranosuke's Friendship Commander.
- No. 3 Tobimasky (トビマスカイ, Tobimasukai): The first robot who can do Super Change by himself. He transforms into Jet Mode (ジェットモード, Jetto Mōdo) by uniting with Kabutack and gives flight capability. The continuation time of Super Mode is 7 minutes. The motif of his biochip is unknown.
- No. 4 Ganiran (ガニラン): A horseshoe crab-type robot with a horseshoe crab-type biochip, but his ability close to that of a crab. Cobrander's henchman. The continuation time of Super Mode is 9 minutes. Super Mode's weapon is the Gani Boomerang (ガニブーメラン, Gani Būmeran).
- No. 5 Spydon (スパイドン, Supaidon): A spider-type robot with a spider-type biochip. Cobrander's henchman. The continuation time of Super Mode is 11 minutes. Super Mode's weapon is the Claw Anchor (クローアンカー, Kurō Ankā).
- No. 6 Dangoron (ダンゴロン): A pill bug-type robot with a pill bug-type biochip. He can transform into a tire form other than Super Mode. The continuation time of Super Mode is 13 minutes. Super Mode's weapon is the Dango Saucer (ダンゴソーサー, Dango Sōsā).
- No. 7 Gerotan (ゲロタン): A frog-type robot with a frog-type biochip. He has a tadpole-type machine for search named the Jakushi (ジャクシー, Jakushī). The continuation time of Super Mode is 13 minutes. Super Mode's weapon is the Jakushi Bomber (ジャクシーボンバー, Jakushī Bonbā).
- No. 8 Cobrander (コブランダー, Koburandā): A cobra-type robot with a cobra-type biochip. The continuation time of Super Mode is 13 minutes. Super Mode's weapon is the Cobra Vute (コブラビュート, Kobura Byūto) whip.
- No. 9 Sharkler (シャークラー, Shākurā): A shark-type robot with a shark-type biochip. The most evil and powerful of the evil B-Robots. The continuation time of Super Mode is 15 minutes. Super Mode's weapons are the FukahiRazor (フカヒレイザー, Fukahireizā) sword and an attacking machine named Kobunzame (コブンザメ).
- No. 10 Tentoleena (テントリーナ, Tentorīna): A ladybug-type robot with a ladybug-type biochip. She is the newest robot which is in Super Mode from the beginning, but she consumes energy highly and does not have combat ability. Her weapon is the Leena Stick (リーナステッキ, Rīna Sutekki).
- Denden Roller (デンデンローラー, Denden Rōrā): A snail-type giant wheel vehicle with a snail-type biochip, it is piloted by Kabutack.

=== Other robots ===
- Captain Tomborg (キャプテントンボーグ, Kyaputen Tonbōgu): A strange dragonfly-type judgement robot who appears whenever both sides battle for a Star Piece (or Fake Star Piece (スターピースモドキ, Sutā Pīsu Modoki)). Because he's powerful, everyone has no choice but to play a game of his choice to win the Star Piece. His body becomes red in autumn. He has the Captain Stick (キャプテンスティック, Kyaputen Sutikku) with a dragonfly-shaped microphone. During games, he forms a ring with four dragonfly-type machines named Tosenbo (トーセンボ, Tōsenbo).

=== Support giant robots ===
- DodeKabutack (ドデカブタック, Dodekabutakku): A giant robot created by Kabutack with the Star Piece of Sagittarius as countermeasures to TondemoJaws, it is piloted by Kabutack. It transforms from Normal Mode into Super Mode. Super Mode's weapons are the Bilit Scop (ビリットスコップ, Biritto Sukoppu) and the Dodeka Shield (ドデカシールド, Dodeka Shīrudo).
- Tondemo-Jaws (トンデモジョーズ, Tondemojōzu): A giant robot created by Dr. Kouenji with the very first Star Piece of Scorpio he founded; it is piloted by Sharkler. It transforms from Normal Mode into Super Mode. Super Mode's weapons are the Fin Blade (フィンブレード, Fin Burēdo) sword, Jaws Shield (ジョーズシールド, Jōzu Shīrudo), and Giza Head (ギザーヘッド, Gizā Heddo) saw.

=== People in Asahi ===
- Yuzuru Kouenji (高円寺 譲, Kōenji Yuzuru): Kabutack's partner and Torahiko's grandson. He transforms Kabutack from Normal Form into Super Mode using the Friendship Commander.
- Kuranosuke Kichijouji (吉祥寺 蔵之助, Kichijōji Kuranosuke): Kuwagiro's partner and the son of the vice president of construction company Kichijouji Koumuten (吉祥寺工務店, Kichijōji Kōmuten) named Ryunosuke (龍之介, Ryūnosuke) whose wife is its president. He transforms Kuwagiro from Normal Form into Super Mode using the Friendship Commander.
- Sayuri Mitaka (三鷹 小百合, Mitaka Sayuri): A friend of Yuzuru and Kuranosuke who lives in the same apartment as Tentoleena. She has a younger brother named Mitsuo (光夫).
- Dr. Torahiko Kouenji (高円寺 寅彦, Kōenji Torahiko): Yuzuru's grandfather who created B-Robots.
- Masatora Kouenji (高円寺 正寅, Kōenji Masatora): Yuzuru's father and Torahiko's son. He treats Torahiko and B-Robots as a nuisance.
- Madoka Kouenji (高円寺 円, Kōenji Madoka): Yuzuru's mother. She as well as Masatora treats Torahiko and B-Robots as a nuisance.
- Taro Koganei (小金井 太郎, Koganei Tarō): A greedy storekeeper of an antique shop.
- Akira Ogikubo (荻窪 明, Ogikubo Akira): Kuranosuke's rival.
- Reika Ookubo (大久保 麗香, Ōkubo Reika): Sayuri's rival and a multimillionaire's daughter. She has two elder sisters named Reiko (麗子) and Reina (麗奈). She also has many servants, including butler Toyoda (豊田).
- Miki Nakano (中野 美樹, Nakano Miki): A policewoman who patrols Asahi (朝日町, Asahi-chō). She later resigned and returned to her hometown because she wanted to work in the fields.
- AP717: A robot which patrols Asahi with Miki. Its body is similar to Tentoleena.

=== Guest characters ===
- Junichiro Kunitachi (国立 準一郎, Kunitachi Junichirō): A music teacher of Yuzuru's elementary school whose voice is very similar to Kabutack. He resigned to become a singer. Portrayed by Takeshi Kusao (草尾 毅, Kusao Takeshi), who also voices Kabutack.
- Star Mind (スターマインド, Sutā Maindo): The god of Earth who appeared when all Star Pieces were collected. He later becomes his true form named Star Mind S (スターマインドS, Sutā Maindo Esu). Portrayed by Lucky Ikeda (ラッキィ池田, Rakkyi Ikeda) while Star Mind S is voiced by Takuma Suzuki (鈴木 琢磨, Suzuki Takuma).

== Episodes ==
1. Pleased to Meet You, Kabu! (よろしくカブー！, Yoroshiku Kabū!): written by Takashi Yamada, directed by Taro Sakamoto
2. Let a Miracle Happen, Kabu (メークドラマだカブ, Mēku Dorama da Kabu): written by Satoru Nishizono, directed by Taro Sakamoto
3. Devoted Cuisine, Kabu (料理はまごころカブ, Ryōri wa Magokoro Kabu): written by Takashi Yamada, directed by Katsuya Watanabe
4. Umeboshi One-Armed Shoulder Throw!! (ウメ星一本背負い！！, Umeboshi Ippon Zeoi!!): written by Satoru Nishizono, directed by Katsuya Watanabe
5. Tracking!! Drunken Tire (追跡！！酒飲みタイヤ, Tsuiseki!! Sakenomi Taiya): written by Satoru Nishizono, directed by Hidenori Ishida
6. Fickled Detective Kabutack (浮気探偵カブタック, Uwaki Tantei Kabutakku): written by Takashi Yamada, directed by Hidenori Ishida
7. The Cursed Time of Weakness (弱り目にタタリじゃ, Yowarime ni Tatari ja): written by Yoshio Urasawa, directed by Taro Sakamoto
8. Blessed Red Postbox (幸せの赤いポスト, Shiawase no Akai Posuto): written by Nobuo Ogizawa, directed by Taro Sakamoto
9. Right This Instant!! (飛びますトビマス！！, Tobimasu Tobimasu!!): written by Takashi Yamada, directed by Katsuya Watanabe
10. The Monster That Disappears With the Sunset (夕陽に消える怪獣, Yūhi ni Kieru Kaijū): written by Satoru Nishizono, directed by Katsuya Watanabe
11. The May Koinobori Tournament!! (鯉のぼり五月場所！！, Koinobori Gogatsu Basho!!): written by Yoshio Urasawa, directed by Naoki Iwahara
12. A Cleaning Pair (お掃除ふたりぼっち, Osōji Futari Botchi): written by Satoru Nishizono, directed by Naoki Iwahara
13. Iron Fist of Indisputable Anger (問答無用怒りの鉄拳, Mondō Muyō Ikari no Tekken): written by Takashi Yamada, directed by Hidenori Ishida
14. Deliver to the Stars, My First Love (星に届けボクの初恋, Hoshi ni Todoke Boku no Hatsukoi): written by Takashi Yamada, directed by Hidenori Ishida
15. Mystery of the Riddle Mummy (なぞなぞミイラの謎, Nazonazo Miira no Nazo): written by Junichi Miyashita, directed by Taro Sakamoto
16. Tasty Companion's New Appearance (美味しい仲間新登場, Oishii Nakama Shin Tōjō): written by Satoru Nishizono, directed by Taro Sakamoto
17. 100 Rounds of Sparring of Friendship!! (友情の百人組手！！, Yūjō no Hyakunin Kumite!!): written by Satoru Nishizono, directed by Katsuya Watanabe
18. The Great Prediction of the Annoying Doctor (迷惑博士の大予言, Meiwaku Hakase no Dai Yogen): written by Nobuo Ogizawa, directed by Katsuya Watanabe
19. Infiltration!! Dancer Boy Party (潜入！！踊り子少年隊, Sennyū!! Odoriko Shōnen Tai): written by Yoshio Urasawa, directed by Hidenori Ishida
20. Companion Crack Serious Game!! (仲間割れ真剣勝負！！, Nakama Ware Shinken Shōbu!!): written by Takashi Yamada, directed by Hidenori Ishida
21. The Snail That Falls in Love (恋するかたつむり, Koisuru Katatsumuri): written by Yoshio Urasawa, directed by Naoki Iwahara
22. Swimsuit Attack Number One (水着でアタックNO. 1, Mizugi de Atakku Nanbā Wan): written by Satoru Nishizono, directed by Naoki Iwahara
23. Aim For the Ace of Flames (炎のエースをねらえ, Honō no Ēsu o Nerae): written by Satoru Nishizono, directed by Naoki Iwahara
24. Papa's Foolish Fishing Diary (パパの釣りバカ日誌, Papa no Tsuri Baka Nisshi): written by Takashi Yamada, directed by Taro Sakamoto
25. The Power of the Silent Running Man (男は黙って全力疾走, Otoko wa Damatte Zenryoku Shissō): written by Junichi Miyashita, directed by Taro Sakamoto
26. The Ghost Likes Watermelons (幽霊はスイカ好き, Yūrei wa Suika Zuki): written by Yoshio Urasawa, directed by Hidenori Ishida
27. The Assignment Is Gang Suppression (宿題はギャング退治, Shukudai wa Gyangu Taiji): written by Nobuo Ogizawa, directed by Hidenori Ishida
28. Shark Robot's Tooth of Life!? (サメロボは歯が命！？, Same Robo wa Ha ga Inochi!?): written by Takashi Yamada, directed by Hidenori Ishida
29. The Release of the Mystery of the B-Robots (大公開ビーロボの謎, Dai Kōkai Bī Robo no Nazo): written by Takashi Yamada, directed by Naoki Iwahara
30. String Out! A New Finisher!! (飛び出せ新必殺技！！, Tobidase Shin Hissatsuwaza!!): written by Takashi Yamada, directed by Naoki Iwahara
31. Invasion!! Big Jaws (襲来！！巨大ジョーズ, Shūrai!! Kyodai Jōzu): written by Satoru Nishizono, directed by Taro Sakamoto
32. Amazing! Giant Confrontation (凄いぞ！！ドデカ対決, Sugoi zo!! Dodeka Taiketsu): written by Satoru Nishizono, directed by Taro Sakamoto
33. All-Inclusive Ripening!! Red Judgment Soul (完熟！！赤い審判魂, Kanjuku!! Akai Shinpan Damashii): written by Junichi Miyashita, directed by Hidenori Ishida
34. Ogre Baba Pulling Out of Love (愛情の鬼ババ抜き, Aijō no Oni Baba Nuki): written by Yoshio Urasawa, directed by Hidenori Ishida
35. B-Robot's Great Fall Game (秋のビーロボ大運動会, Aki no Bī Robo Dai Undōkai): written by Takashi Yamada, directed by Katsuya Watanabe
36. The Song of Battle!! Everyone Is Gathering (歌合戦だ！！全員集合, Uta Gassen da!! Zenin Shūgō): written by Satoru Nishizono, directed by Katsuya Watanabe
37. Brilliant Inference!! The Secret Of K.T. (名推理！！ＫＴの秘密, Mei Suiri!! Kē Tī no Himitsu): written by Satoru Nishizono, directed by Naoki Iwahara
38. Reckless Driving!! Labour Appreciation Day (暴走！！勤労感謝の日, Bōsō!! Kinrō Kansha no Hi): written by Junichi Miyashita, directed by Naoki Iwahara
39. Technique of the Frog's Patient Hibernation Method (カエル忍法冬眠の術, Kaeru Ninpō Tōmin no Jutsu): written by Yoshio Urasawa, directed by Taro Sakamoto
40. Retribution Golf Showdown (抱腹絶倒ゴルフ対決, Hōfuku Zettō Gorufu Taiketsu): written by Takashi Yamada, directed by Taro Sakamoto
41. Impersonator Kabutack's Appearance (偽者カブタック出現, Nisemono Kabutakku Shutsugen): written by Satoru Nishizono, directed by Hidenori Ishida
42. The Peking Man Panic!! (北京原人パニック！！, Pekin Genjin Panikku!!): written by Junichi Miyashita, directed by Hidenori Ishida
43. Lucky Pulling Technique of the Girl (お嬢の福引き必勝法, Ojō no Fukubiki Hisshōhō): written by Takashi Yamada, directed by Katsuya Watanabe
44. Celebration!! The New Year Kite Lifting World Cup (祝！！新春凧あげW杯（ワールドカップ）, Shuku!! Shinshun Takoage Wārudo Kappu): written by Nobuo Ogizawa, directed by Katsuya Watanabe
45. Human Feelings Time Slip (人情タイムスリップ, Ninjō Taimu Surippu): written by Yoshio Urasawa, directed by Naoki Iwahara
46. Fighting Illness Last Demon Revolution (闘病トベマセンカイ, Tōbyō Tobemasenkai): written by Satoru Nishizono, directed by Naoki Iwahara
47. Difficult Problem Strange Question Cult Quiz (難問奇問カルトクイズ, Nanmon Kimon Karuto Kuizu): written by Takashi Yamada, directed by Hidenori Ishida
48. Calling Luck to Suppress the Red Ogre (福を呼ぶ赤鬼退治, Fuku o Yobu Akaoni Taiji): written by Satoru Nishizono, directed by Hidenori Ishida
49. Tokyo University Straight Over the Line! (譲の東大一直線！, Yuzuru no Tōdai Itchokusen!): written by Yoshio Urasawa, directed by Satoshi Morota
50. Chocolate-Guy of the Pure-heart (チョコは男の純情, Choko wa Otoko no Junjō): written by Junichi Miyashita, directed by Satoshi Morota
51. The Judge Robot's Unexpected True Identity (審判ロボ意外な正体, Shinpan Robo Igai na Shōtai): written by Satoru Nishizono, directed by Taro Sakamoto
52. If There's Friendship in Your Heart (心に友情あるかぎり, Kokoro ni Yūjō Aru Kagiri): written by Satoru Nishizono, directed by Taro Sakamoto

== Special ==
B-Robo Kabutack: The Epic Christmas Battle!! (ビーロボカブタック クリスマス大決戦！！, Bī Robo Kabutakku Kurisumasu Dai Kessen!!) is a special that features cameos by Blue Beet from Juukou B-Fighter and the title hero from B-Fighter Kabuto.

== Cast ==
- Yuzuru Kouenji: Kazuki Futami (二見 一樹, Futami Kazuki)
- Kuranosuke Kichijouji: Miyabi Kimura (木村 雅, Kimura Miyabi)
- Sayuri Mitaka: Yuka Koide (小出 由華, Koide Yuka)
- Torahiko Kouenji: Kageki Shimoda (志茂田 景樹, Shimoda Kageki)
- Madoka Kouenji: Aki Mukai (向井 亜紀, Mukai Aki)
- Masatora Kouenji: Yousuke Ishii (石井 洋祐, Ishii Yōsuke)
- Akira Ogikubo: Yasushi Ishii (石井 寧, Ishii Yasushi)
- Reika Ookubo: Aoi Inoue (井上 碧, Inoue Aoi)
- Miki Nakano: Sachiko Kokubu (国分 佐智子, Kokubu Sachiko)
- teacher: Yōhei Tadano (多田野 曜平, Tadano Yōhei)
- Mitsuo Mitaka: Yōsuke Mitsuhashi (三觜 要介, Mitsuhashi Yōsuke)
- Taro Koganei: Hiromitsu Suzuki (鈴木 ヒロミツ, Suzuki Hiromitsu)
- Junichiro Kunitachi: Takeshi Kusao (草尾 毅, Kusao Takeshi)

=== Voice cast ===
- Kabutack: Takeshi Kusao (草尾 毅, Kusao Takeshi)
- Kuwagiro: Daiki Nakamura (中村 大樹, Nakamura Daiki)
- Tentoleena: Hikari Tachibana (橘 ひかり, Tachibana Hikari)
- Denden Roller: Kazuki Yao (矢尾 一樹, Yao Kazuki)
- Tobimasky: Satoko Kitō (木藤 聡子, Kitō Satoko)
- Dangoron: Kōichi Tōchika (遠近 孝一, Tōchika Kōichi)
- Gerotan: Motoko Kumai (くまい もとこ, Kumai Motoko)
- AP717: Narumi Tsunoda (津野田 なるみ, Tsunoda Narumi)
- Cobrander: Dai Matsumoto (松本 大, Matsumoto Dai)
- Ganiran: Hisao Egawa (江川 央生, Egawa Hisao)
- Spydon: Chafurin (茶風林, Chafūrin)
- Captain Tomborg: Daisuke Gōri (郷里 大輔, Gōri Daisuke)
- Sharkler: Shigeru Chiba (千葉 繁, Chiba Shigeru)

== Songs ==
Opening theme

- "Kiyoku Tadashiku Kabutack" (清く正しくカブタック, Kiyoku Tadashiku Kabutakku; "Noble Honest Kabutack")
  - Lyrics: Saburō Yatsude (八手 三郎, Yatsude Saburō)
  - Composition & Arrangement: Keiju Ishikawa (石川 恵樹, Ishikawa Keiju)
  - Artist: Takeshi Kusao

Ending theme

- "Gyakuten Rock 'n' Roll!!" (逆転ロックンロール!!, Gyakuten Rokkun Rōru!!; "Inversion Rock 'n' Roll!!")
  - Lyrics: Tamanosuke Ōga (大賀 玉之輔, Ōga Tamanosuke)
  - Composition & Arrangement: MASAKI
  - Artist: Takeshi Kusao

== Home Video and Streaming ==
The entire series is available as a 12-volume VHS (from March 1998 till February 1999 by Toei Video.

In December 2023, the series received a High Definition remaster for the Toei Tokusatsu Fan Club channel.

== International Broadcasts, Home Media & Streaming ==
- In Thailand, the series was released on home video under Kabutack Transforming Insect Robot. (หุ่นยนต์แมลงแปลงร่างคาบูทัค) by TIGA Company with a Thai dub.
- In Indonesia, it aired on RCTI with an Indonesian dub in 2002/2003.
- In South Korea, the series had a Korean dub under B-Robo Gabutak (B-로봇 가브타크) on JEI TV in 2006.
- In the Philippines, it was aired on ABC 5 (now TV5) from 2000 to 2001 with a Tagalog dub.
- In Hong Kong, it aired with a Cantonese dub in 2000.
- The entire series is available as a 12-volume VHS (from March 1998 till February 1999 by Toei Video. In December 2023, the series received a High Definition remaster for the Toei Tokusatsu Fan Club channel.
