= Harold Fethe =

American jazz guitarist

Harold Fethe is a professional jazz guitarist in San Francisco, California who began his recording career later than most. For more than two decades he worked in biotechnology. In 2002 he gave that up and became a full-time musician. He recorded Out of Nowhere, his first album as a bandleader, in 2004 with 87-year-old violinist Johnny Frigo. The album contains mostly standards in a style suggestive of gypsy jazz.

The album received favorable reviews from Jazz Review and AllMusic.

== Discography ==
- Out of Nowhere (Southport, 2006)
