= Sitting in Limbo (album) =

Sitting In Limbo

Studio album by Jessica Molaskey
- Released: May 8, 2007
- Genre: Jazz; show tunes; torch songs
- Label: PS Classics
- Producer: John Pizzarelli

Jessica Molaskey chronology
Make Believe (2004)	Sitting In Limbo (2007)	A Kiss to Build a Dream On (2008)

Professional ratings
Review scores
Source	Rating
AllMusic	4.5/5 stars

Sitting in Limbo is the 2007 album by torch song singer Jessica Molaskey, featuring herself and her husband John Pizzarelli. Also on the album is John's younger brother Martin Pizzarelli, interspersed with guest appearances by tenor saxophonist Harry Allen.

== Track listing ==
No.	Title	Length
1.	"Sitting in Limbo"	3:58
2.	"Heavy Cloud, No Rain"	3:09
3.	"Summer, Highland Falls"	4:16
4.	"Ooh Child"	3:00
5.	"I Want to Be Happy/Sometimes I'm Happy"	2:13
6.	"There Will Never Be Another You"	3:12
7.	"Knowing You"	4:31
8.	"I'm Gonna Sit Right Down and Write Myself a Letter"	3:31
9.	"Circle Game/Waters of March"	4:48
10.	"Walkin' After Midnight"	3:35
11.	"Hearts and Bones"	4:11
12.	"Morning Has Broken/I Woke Up One Early Morning"	4:26

== Personnel ==
- Jessica Molaskey – vocals
- John Pizzarelli – guitar, vocals
- Martin Pizzarelli – double-bass
- Tony Tedesco – drums
- Harry Allen – tenor saxophone
- Larry Goldings or Larry Fuller – piano
