= Christmas Album (Herb Alpert album) =

Studio album by Herb Alpert and the Tijuana Brass
- Released: December 16, 1968
- Studio: Gold Star (Hollywood, California); A&M (Hollywood, California)
- Genre: Christmas; salsa
- Length: 31:37
- Label: A&M
- Producer: Herb Alpert, Jerry Moss

Herb Alpert and the Tijuana Brass chronology
The Beat of the Brass (1968)	Christmas Album (1968)	Warm (1969)

Alternate cover
- Alternate album cover for 1981 re-release

Professional ratings
Review scores
Source	Rating
AllMusic	link

Christmas Album is a late-1968 album by Herb Alpert & the Tijuana Brass. It was the group's eleventh release. The LP edition of the album was issued twice. The original edition had the cover photography filling the front and back sides of the album jacket. For the reissue, the photos were reduced to half size and placed in the center of a white background. Although the Brass' albums were out of print for a good many years, the Christmas Album was released on CD in the 1980s (with the CD release sporting the altered cover artwork), with annual reappearances in record stores at Christmastime. The album was re-released again on CD by the Shout!Factory label in 2006 as were many of the other Tijuana Brass albums. The Shout!Factory release restored the original artwork to the front cover and featured the original back cover on the included CD booklet. Another CD re-release occurred on October 23, 2015 (Herb Alpert Presents label, remastered), this time restoring the original artwork to the front and back.

The album contains a mixture of popular Christmas-season music, mostly American secular standards. Exceptions include the Bach piece "Jesu, Joy of Man's Desiring," and a traditional Hispanic number, "Las Mañanitas." The latter song's arrangement, provided by marimbist Julius Wechter, is nearly identical to one used by Wechter's Baja Marimba Band several years earlier, on their 1965 album For Animals Only. The songs's title literally means "The Little Mornings"; the song is traditionally sung on the morning of one's birthday celebration, or the day of a religious figure such as a saint (or, in this case, Jesus).

The cover features the image of Alpert, who is Jewish, dressed as Santa Claus while playing his trumpet.

Collaborating with Alpert in the production was his usual cadre of musicians: Nick Ceroli (drums/percussion), Bob Edmondson (trombone), Tonni Kalash (trumpet), Lou Pagani (keyboards), John Pisano (guitars/mandolin) and Pat Senatore (bass). Perennial sideman Julius Wechter appears on marimba and percussion. Alpert provides lead vocals on "The Christmas Song" and "The Bell That Couldn't Jingle," and a studio choir and string instruments are arranged by Shorty Rogers.

== Track listing ==
=== Side 1 ===
1. "Winter Wonderland" (Richard B. Smith, Felix Bernard) – 3:02
2. "Jingle Bells" (James Pierpont, arranged by Herb Alpert and John Pisano) – 3:08
3. "My Favorite Things" (Rodgers and Hammerstein) – 3:01
4. "The Christmas Song" (Mel Tormé, Robert Wells) – 3:38
5. "Las Mañanitas" (Traditional; arranged by Julius Wechter) – 2:57

=== Side 2 ===
1. "Sleigh Ride" (Leroy Anderson) – 3:56
2. "The Bell That Couldn't Jingle" (Burt Bacharach, Larry Kusik) – 2:55
3. "Let It Snow, Let It Snow, Let It Snow" (Sammy Cahn, Jule Styne) – 3:44
4. "Jingle Bell Rock" (Joe Beal, Jim Boothe) – 1:50
5. "Jesu, Joy of Man's Desiring" (Johann Sebastian Bach) – 3:26
