= Debut of a Legend =

Studio album by Johnny Frigo
- Released: 1994
- Recorded: May 26–27, 1994
- Studio: Master Sound Studios, Queens, New York
- Genre: Jazz, swing
- Length: 55:57
- Label: Chesky
- Producer: David Chesky, Steve Kaiser

Johnny Frigo chronology
| Live from Studio A in New York City (1988) | Debut of a Legend (1994) | Live at the Floating Jazz Festival (1999) |

Professional ratings
Review scores
| Source | Rating |
|---|---|
| Allmusic | 4.5/5 stars |
| The Penguin Guide to Jazz Recordings | 3/4 stars |

Debut of a Legend is an album by jazz violinist Johnny Frigo that was released by Chesky in 1994.

== Track listing ==
1. "Get Happy" (Harold Arlen, Ted Koehler) – 4:33
2. "I'm Old Fashioned" (Jerome Kern, Johnny Mercer) – 4:03
3. "Osaka Saki" (Johnny Frigo) – 3:04
4. "Too Late Now/Street of Dreams" (Burton Lane, Alan Jay Lerner) – 5:10
5. "Bow Jest" (Frigo) – 3:30
6. "Nuages" (Django Reinhardt) – 4:25
7. "Jitterbug Waltz" (Richard Maltby, Jr., Fats Waller) – 6:14
8. "Heather on the Hill/How Are Things in Glocca Morra?" (Lerner, Frederick Loewe) – 5:25
9. "I Love Paris" (Cole Porter) – 5:01
10. "Here's That Rainy Day" (Johnny Burke, James VanHeusen) – 6:19
11. "Lush Life" (Billy Strayhorn) – 3:09
12. "Jeannine" (Duke Pearson) – 5:04

== Personnel ==
- Johnny Frigo – violin
- Bob Kindred – clarinet, tenor saxophone
- Joe Vito – piano
- Gene Bertoncini – guitar
- Michael Moore – double bass
- Bill Goodwin – drums
