= Phillip Officer =

American musician

- Born: January 16, 1956?
- Genres: Cabaret
- Website: www.phillipofficer.com

Phillip Officer (born January 16, 1956 [?]) is an American musician from Missouri whom Rex Reed has hailed as "the real deal."

== Early life ==
Officer grew up in the Midwest and moved to New York City as an adult, and later to Las Vegas, Nevada.

== Career ==
Officer appeared as the Geek in the 1997 Broadway musical Side Show, which became a cult classic.

He has performed at New York City's Carnegie Hall and the Oak Room of the Algonquin Hotel, as well as at other sophisticated venues.

Officer is also a licensed real estate broker.

== Partial discography ==
- Fancy Meeting You Songs of E.Y. "Yip" Harburg
- Many a New Day Songs of Oscar Hammerstein II
- You Keep Coming Back Like a Song
- Hoagy on My Mind, first released in spring 2001, was reissued as Heart and Soul. This CD featured the veteran jazz violinist Johnny Frigo.

Regarding Hammerstein, Officer notes that "I know he's viewed as somehow being too simple, too direct." Also: "People say he's not as sophisticated as Porter or as witty as Hart. But he's written plenty of songs that are filled with poetry. 'All the Things You Are' is a classic, of course. But there also is a song like 'Don't Ever Leave Me,' which was also written with Jerome Kern, that is poetic and simple."

== Awards ==
Officer received a MAC Award in 1997 for major male vocal engagement. The award was presented by the Manhattan Association of Cabarets and Clubs.
