= Tokyo Girl (Club Mix Version) =

1993 single by Yōko Oginome

Single by Yōko Oginome
- Language: Japanese
- B-side: "Umi no Sango"
- Released: June 23, 1993
- Recorded: 1993
- Genre: J-pop; dance-pop
- Label: Victor
- Songwriters: Takashi Matsumoto; Kenji Hayashida
- Producer: Edison

Yōko Oginome singles chronology
"Yumemiru Planet" (1993)	"Tokyo Girl (Club Mix Version)" (1993)	"Romance" (1993)

Music video
- "Tokyo Girl (Club Mix Version)" on YouTube

"Tokyo Girl (Club Mix Version)" is the 28th single by Japanese singer Yōko Oginome. Written by Takashi Matsumoto and Kenji Hayashida, the single was released on June 23, 1993, by Victor Entertainment.

== Background and release ==
The song is a remix of "Tokyo Girl", which was used as the insert song of the NHK drama special Dorama Shin Ginga: Tokyo Kunitori Monogatari (ドラマ新銀河・トーキョー国盗り物語; Drama New Galaxy: Tokyo Country Stealing Story), which starred Oginome. The original version was not released until 2010, when it was included as a bonus track in the re-release of Oginome's 1993 album De-Luxe.

"Tokyo Girl (Club Mix Version)" peaked at No. 66 on Oricon's singles chart and sold over 10,000 copies.

== Track listing ==
All lyrics are written by Takashi Matsumoto; all music is composed by Kenji Hayashida.

No.	Title	Arrangement	Length
1.	"Tokyo Girl (Club Mix Version)"	E.S.P.
2.	"Umi no Sango" ((海の珊瑚; "Sea Coral"))	Masayuki Iwata
3.	"Tokyo Girl (Club Mix Version) (Original Karaoke)" ((TOKYO GIRL 〜club mix version〜(オリジナル・カラオケ)))
4.	"Umi no Sango (Original Karaoke)" ((海の珊瑚(オリジナル・カラオケ); "Sea Coral (Original Karaoke)"))

== Charts ==
Chart (1993)	Peak position
Oricon Weekly Singles Chart	66
