= I Love John Frigo...He Swings =

Studio album by Johnny Frigo
- Released: December 12, 1957
- Recorded: 1957
- Genres: Jazz, swing
- Length: 31:24
- Label: Mercury
- Producer: Bryan Koniarz

Johnny Frigo chronology
I Love John Frigo...He Swings	Live from Studio A in New York City

Professional ratings
Review scores
Source	Rating
AllMusic	4/5 stars
The Penguin Guide to Jazz Recordings	3/4 stars

I Love John Frigo...He Swings is the debut album of jazz violinist Johnny Frigo for Mercury Records. Despite the high caliber of Frigo's collaborators, the album was more or less ignored on its release. It would be decades later that he would get the chance to record as a leader again, in the interim performing mainly as a bassist rather than a violinist.

The material is varied, encompassing "lush instrumentals", "impressionistic pieces", and "soft duets with pianist Mike Simpson". On "Big Me-Little Me", Frigo duets with himself, playing both violin and bass.

== Track listing ==
1. "What a Diff'rence a Day Made" – 2:31
2. "Polka Dots and Moonbeams" – 4:19
3. "Blow Fiddle Blow" – 2:50
4. "Blue Orchids" – 3:02
5. "Gone with the Wind" – 3:04
6. "Squeeze Me" – 3:37
7. "You Stepped Out of a Dream" – 2:58
8. "Moonlight in Vermont" – 3:17
9. "If Love Is Good to Me" – 3:33
10. "Big Me-Little Me" – 2:13

== Personnel ==
- Johnny Frigo – violin, double bass
- Cy Touff – trumpet
- Dick Marx – piano, celesta
- Herb Ellis – guitar
- Ray Brown – double bass
- Norm Jeffries – drums
