= Yumemiru Planet =

1993 single by Yōko Oginome

Single by Yōko Oginome with Ugo Ugo Lhuga

from the album De-Luxe
- Language: Japanese
- English title: The Dreaming Planet
- B-side: "Ai wa Yume, Koi wa Maboroshi"
- Released: May 21, 1993
- Recorded: 1993
- Genre: J-pop; children's
- Label: Victor
- Songwriters: Yumi Yoshimoto; Nao Asada
- Producer: Yōko Oginome

Yōko Oginome singles chronology
| "Romantic ni Aishite" (1992) | "Yumemiru Planet" (1993) | "Tokyo Girl (Club Mix Version)" (1993) |

Music video
- "Yumemiru Planet" on YouTube

"Yumemiru Planet" (夢みるPLANET, Yumemiru Puranetto; lit. "The Dreaming Planet") is the 27th single by Japanese singer Yōko Oginome. Written by Yumi Yoshimoto and Nao Asada, the single was released on May 21, 1993, by Victor Entertainment.

== Background and release ==
The song was used as the ending theme song of the Fuji TV children's variety show Ugo Ugo Lhuga (ウゴウゴ・ルーガ, Ugo Ugo Rūga), featuring Hidetō Tajima as Ugo Ugo-kun and Yuka Koide as Lhuga-chan on backing vocals. Oginome was also a regular in the show as Planet-chan.

"Yumemiru Planet" peaked at No. 33 on Oricon's singles chart and sold over 47,000 copies.

== Track listing ==
| No. | Title | Lyrics | Music | Arrangement | Length |
|---|---|---|---|---|---|
| 1. | "Yumemiru Planet" (Yumemiru Puranetto (夢見るPLANET; "The Dreaming Planet")) | Yumi Yoshimoto | Nao Asada | Shirō Sagisu |
| 2. | "Ai wa Yume, Koi wa Maboroshi" ((愛はユメ恋はマボロシ; "Love Is a Dream, Love Is an Illusion")) | Miyuki Asano | Akitoshi Onodera | Yukio Sugai; Kōichi Kaminaga; Ryūjin Inoue |
| 3. | "Yumemiru Planet (Original Karaoke)" ((夢見るPLANET(オリジナル・カラオケ); "The Dreaming Planet (Original Karaoke)")) |
| 4. | "Ai wa Yume, Koi wa Maboroshi (Original Karaoke)" ((愛はユメ恋はマボロシ(オリジナル・カラオケ); "Love Is a Dream, Love Is an Illusion (Original Karaoke)")) |

== Charts ==
| Chart (1993) | Peak position |
|---|---|
| Oricon Weekly Singles Chart | 33 |
