= Warm (Herb Alpert album) =

Studio album by Herb Alpert and the Tijuana Brass
- Released: June 1969
- Studio: Gold Star (Hollywood, California); A&M (Hollywood, California)
- Genre: Easy Listening, jazz pop
- Length: 33:54
- Label: A&M
- Producer: Herb Alpert, Jerry Moss

Herb Alpert and the Tijuana Brass chronology
Christmas Album (1968)	Warm (1969)	The Brass Are Comin' (1969)

Warm is a 1969 album by Herb Alpert & the Tijuana Brass. It reached number 28 on the Billboard 200 album chart.

== Background ==
Warm was a vast departure from previous Tijuana Brass albums and featured much slower-paced songs, leaning more toward a Brazilian type of sound. At this point in his career, Alpert had grown tired of the band's previous style of music, feeling that it was repetitive, and wanted to try a different direction.

The opening track, "The Sea Is My Soil", is among the longest songs ever released by the Tijuana Brass at four and a half minutes, while two songs on the album feature lead vocals by Alpert ("Without Her" and "To Wait for Love"), all of which were released as singles.

== Critical reception ==
Professional ratings
Review scores
Source	Rating
Allmusic	2.5/5 stars

In his review for Allmusic, music critic Richard S. Ginell called the album mellow, richly textured, but noted it "couldn't crack the Top 20, for the Brass' cross-generational appeal was fading fast."

== Track listing ==
Track	Title	Composers	Time
1	The Sea Is My Soil	Dory Caymmi, Nelson Mota	4:30
2	Without Her	Harry Nilsson	3:24
3	Marjorine	Sol Lake	3:06
4	Girl Talk	Neal Hefti, Bobby Troup	2:54
5	Ob-La-Di, Ob-La-Da	John Lennon, Paul McCartney	1:59
6	Zazueira	Jorge Ben	3:14
7	The Continental	Herb Magidson, Con Conrad	2:07
8	Pretty World	Antonio Adolfo, Tiberio Gaspar, Alan Bergman, Marilyn Bergman	3:46
9	Warm	Julius Wechter	2:33
10	To Wait for Love	Burt Bacharach, Hal David	2:59
11	Sandbox	John Pisano	3:24

== Charts ==
Chart (1969)	Peak position
US Billboard Top LPs	28
