= Make Believe (Jessica Molaskey album) =

Studio album by Jessica Molaskey
- Released: October 5, 2004
- Genre: Show tunes; torch songs; jazz standards
- Label: PS Classics
- Producer: Tommy Krasker; John Pizzarelli

Jessica Molaskey chronology
A Good Day (2003)	Make Believe (2004)	Sitting in Limbo (2007)

Professional ratings
Review scores
Source	Rating
AllMusic	4.5/5 stars

Make Believe is the third album by torch song singer Jessica Molaskey, accompanied by an all-star musical group that includes Bucky Pizzarelli and John Pizzarelli. Guest singer Adam Guettel joins her for a duet on "Glad to Be Unhappy".

== Track listing ==
No.	Title	Length
1.	"I Can't Say No"	3:17
2.	"Guys and Dolls"	2:40
3.	"Make Believe"	3:04
4.	"Stepsisters' Lament"	1:51
5.	"Glad to Be Unhappy"	4:09
6.	"Hey, Look Me Over!"	3:25
7.	"So Many People"	3:11
8.	"Cloudburst/Getting Married Today"	2:54
9.	"Growing Pains"	3:32
10.	"All That Jazz"	4:21
11.	"Right as the Rain"	3:32
12.	"You're a Builder Upper"	2:45
13.	"Cradle and All"	5:29
14.	"Goodnight My Someone"	2:27

== Personnel ==
- Jessica Molaskey – vocals
- John Pizzarelli – guitar, vocals
- Bucky Pizzarelli – guitar
- Martin Pizzarelli – double-bass
- Tony Tedesco – drums
- Adam Guettel – guest, vocals (track 5)
- Don Sebesky – musical arranger, orchestra
- John Clayton – music arrangement, orchestra
