= From Out of Nowhere =

From Out of Nowhere may refer to:

- "From Out of Nowhere" (song), a song by Faith No More
- From Out of Nowhere (Jeff Lynne's ELO album), a 2019 album
- From Out of Nowhere (Tommy Emmanuel album), a 1979 album
- "From Out of Nowhere" (Power Rangers in Space), a 1998 television episode

== See also ==
- Out of Nowhere (disambiguation)
