= Pentimento (album) =

Studio album by Jessica Molaskey
- Released: 4 June 2002
- Recorded: February 2001
- Genre: Show tunes; Jazz standards
- Label: PS Classics
- Producer: Tommy Krasker; Leslie Ann Jones

Jessica Molaskey chronology
Pentimento (2002)	A Good Day (2003)

Professional ratings
Review scores
Source	Rating
AllMusic	4/5 stars

Pentimento is the 2002 debut album by singer Jessica Molaskey performing standards of the 1920s and 1930s. She is joined by an all-star cast of musicians, including her husband John Pizzarelli, father-in-law Bucky Pizzarelli, violinist Johnny Frigo and her brother-in-law, Martin Pizzarelli.

== Track listing ==
No.	Title	Length
1.	"Oh, You Beautiful Doll"	2:44
2.	"I'm Just Wild About Harry"	3:02
3.	"Ain't We Got Fun?"	3:06
4.	"What'll I Do?"	3:31
5.	"With Plenty of Money and You/We're in the Money"	3:22
6.	"Waiting for the Train to Come In"	2:29
7.	"Red, Red Robin"	2:42
8.	"By the Beautiful Sea"	1:57
9.	"I'm Always Chasing Rainbows"	2:49
10.	"Oh, How I Hate to Get Up in the Morning"	2:46
11.	"You Made Me Love You"	4:12
12.	"I Tried Too Hard for Too Long"	1:50
13.	"When I Lost You"	1:05
14.	"Look for the Silver Lining"	1:55
15.	"I Can't Give You Anything But Love"	3:18
16.	"Beautiful Dreamer"	1:37
17.	"Sail Away"	2:57

== Personnel ==
- Jessica Molaskey – vocals
- John Pizzarelli – guitar, vocals, arrangements
- Martin Pizzarelli – double-bass
- Tony Tedesco – percussion
- Johnny Frigo – violin
- Jesse Levy – cello
- Larry Goldings – piano, arrangements
- Ken Peplowski – clarinet
- Bucky Pizzarelli – guitar, ukulele
