= Romance (guitar piece) =

Guitar composition

Composition
- Written: Late 19th century
- Genre: Parlour music
- Songwriter: Unknown
- "Romance Anónimo" (2:47) Performed by Jim Greeninger; melody begins at 1:08.

"Romance Anónimo" (Anonymous Romance) is a piece for guitar, also known as "Estudio en Mi de Rubira" (Study in E by Rubira), "Spanish Romance", "Romance de España", "Romance de Amor", "Romance of the Guitar", "Romanza" and "Romance d'Amour", among other names. It is composed in the style of parlour music of the late 19th century in Spain or South America.

== History ==
The style of the piece is that of the parlour music of the late 19th century in Spain or South America. It has a closed three-part form, the first in the minor key, the second in the major key, and the third part a restatement of the first.

The origins and authorship of the piece are unknown, hence "anónimo". It is thought to have been originally a solo instrumental guitar work from the 19th century and has variously been attributed to Antonio Rubira, David del Castillo, Francisco Tárrega, Fernando Sor, Daniel Fortea, Francisco Vicaria l Llobet, Antonio Cano, Vicente Gómez, and Narciso Yepes. It has been suggested that doubts about its authorship may have been encouraged by a wish to avoid paying copyright fees and the desire of publishing companies to claim the lucrative copyright.

== Early recordings ==
The earliest recording of "Romance" is found on a cylinder from the "Viuda de Aramburo" label featuring guitarists Luis and Simon Ramírez, which was made in Madrid sometime between 1897 and 1901. The work is titled "Sort-Estudio para Guitarra por S. Ramirez". The name "Sort", as it occurs on the cylinder's title, probably refers to Fernando Sor, as his surname is sometimes spelled "Sort" or "Sorts". The recording may be heard on the Doremi CD release "Tarrega, His Disciples, and Their Students" (DHR-7996) and online at the UCSB Cylinder Audio Archive.

== Possible origins ==
=== Early published versions ===
==== Antonio Rubira ====
An early publication of the work, known as "Estudio para Guitarra" de Rovira and attributed to Spanish guitarist Antonio Rubira, was published by J.A. Medina e Hijo in Argentina before 1925 (probably in 1913, when the publisher ceased activities).

Guitarist and composer Isaías Sávio (Montevideo, 1900 — São Paulo, 1977) published the work in 1959 with the title "Romance de Amor (Estudo em Mi) Música de Antonio Rovira (Segunda metade do século XIX)" He published information which cited Antonio Rubira as the author. (See "Violão e Mestres" Junio, 1966 / São Paulo, Brasil.)

Sávio gives information that Juan Pargas, who knew Rubira, gave the Estudio de Rovira to the guitarist Juan Valles in 1876 or 1878. Sávio mentions that the work became popular in Buenos Aires and began to be published by, among others, Spaniard Pedro Maza; and that the work appeared in the method of Pedro Mascaró y Reissig, published in Montevideo in 1919 (page 14), with the title "Conocido por Estudio de Rovira".

Publishing company Ricordi of Argentina currently publishes the piece, and attributes authorship to Antonio Rubira.

=== Manuscripts ===
The earliest documented manuscripts of the piece are from the late 19th century. One attributes authorship to Antonio Rubira; another, unsigned, version has a note at the bottom which says "Melodia de Sor" (Sor's melody), possibly referring to Fernando Sor. A noticeable difference between these manuscripts and the famous version of Yepes is the inverted arpeggio. Both manuscripts, though believed to be from the late 19th Century, have not been formally dated. They are not believed to be in the handwriting of the alleged authors, but are thought to be copies made by students or other musicians. (Note that Fernando Sor died in 1839.)

The Ukrainian folk song Nich Yaka Misyachna (Beautiful Moonlight) could be a precursor of the piece. Although some correlation can be made between Beethoven's Moonlight Sonata (especially the arpeggio), the Romance guitar piece and the Ukrainian folk song, the Ukrainian version has enjoyed much success through Eastern Europe and Russia and is vastly different from the Spanish/Argentine song and its various arrangements. Most European music is largely governed by the same harmonic principles, and similarities between unrelated original compositions are not uncommon.

=== Disproved origins ===
Narciso Yepes (1927 — 1997) interpreted the piece and is credited as its author in René Clément's 1952 film Jeux interdits (Forbidden Games). The popularity of the film gave the piece worldwide fame. Yepes currently has the copyright in Spain, although recordings and manuscripts exist which predate 1952. Newer publications name Yepes as the arranger and the piece being either of anonymous authorship, or the work of Fernando Sor.

The official statement from Narciso Yepes and the Yepes heirs is that Narciso Yepes composed this piece for his mother when he was about seven years old (circa 1934), and soon after performed it between acts at the Teatro Guerra, in Lorca, Spain. Some time later, he recounts, when he was thirteen years old, he attended a performance in Valencia and heard his composition presented by another guitarist, who indicated the authorship as "anonymous". Yepes contends that the piece had been plagiarized (with some changes to the arrangement) by someone who, he assumes, must have heard his performance of it first.

Yepes, however, was born in 1927 and cannot be the author of the work, since there was already a recording of it in existence in 1900; and it had been published before 1925, possibly as early as 1913, by J.A. MEDINA e HIJO; and in 1919 in the method of Pedro Mascaró y Reissig.

Vicente Gomez (1911–2001) published this piece and performed it in 1941 in the Hollywood movie Blood and Sand, also attributing authorship to himself.

== Other arrangements ==
- Swedish singer Lill Lindfors covered the piece as "Du är den ende" (Eng: "You are the only one") in 1966, with Swedish lyrics by poet Bo Setterlind with an orchestral arrangement by Marcus Österdahl, also included on her 1967 album Du är den ende. Record producer Curt Pettersson asked for a Latin/Mediterranean influenced arrangement and Marcus Österdahl used his Höfner-bassguiter to create a significant sound that created a ‘shot-gun’ effect for attention. A long time later, Lill Lindfors heard from Bo Setterlind that his lyrics version was not based on a love affair, but instead aimed at Jesus.
- The Raphael song "Tema de Amor" was performed in the 1968 Argentinian film Digan lo que digan (Let Them Talk) and it used this song as the melody with lyrics.
- The Dutch Duo de Koning recorded the song as ‘Ave Maria klinkt zacht door de nacht’ probably in 1968.
- This piece was the melody for the 1970 Françoise Hardy song "San Salvador".
- The first song of Al Bano and Romina Power was a vocal version, titled "Storia di due innamorati" in 1970.
- Gabi Novak recorded a version titled "Zaboravljeni refren" by Arsen Dedić in 1972.
- The Julio Iglesias song "Quiero" from the 1975 album El Amor used this song as the melody, with added lyrics.
- German singer Bernhard Brink performed a vocal version in 1976 (title: "Liebe auf Zeit").
- An electronic version of the piece was used as background music for the 1980 arcade game Phoenix.
- Andy Williams recorded a version titled "Vino de Amor" by Tony Hiller and Nicky Graham on his 1984 album Greatest Love Classics
- Japanese singer Yōko Oginome recorded the song as her 1993 single "Romance".
- German group B-Tribe used a fragment of it on the track "Desesperada" from their 1998 album Sensual Sensual.
- Nana Mouskouri recorded a vocal version without lyrics titled "Romance" on her 1997 album Hommages
- Czech female singer Iveta Bartošová recorded the song "Pomněnka" in 1998 with lyrics by Vladimír Kočandrle.
- Eddie Vedder played a version as an opening for the Pearl Jam song "Better Man" several times throughout their Binaural Tour (2000), and has most recently played it in Mexico City in 2005.
- The Korean drama Autumn in My Heart (2000) used this song in its soundtrack.
- The American rock band My Chemical Romance included this piece as the first song on their debut album, I Brought You My Bullets, You Brought Me Your Love, released in 2002.
- Mike Oldfield used a fragment of the piece in his track "Romance" on his 2005 album Light + Shade. Oldfield used only the minor section of the tune and added his own variations to it.
- The Buck 65 song "The Outskirts" from the 2007 album Situation uses this piece as backing.
- Cantopop singer Eason Chan included this piece on his 2011 album title release, Stranger Under My Skin. It is a bilingual English and Cantonese song with lyrics by Chow Yiu-Fai.
- Lykke Li covered the piece as "Du är den ende" for the Swedish film Tommy in 2014.
- A vocal version including lyrics, which is called Forbidden Games (Jeux Interdits) (sometimes also Romance of Love) was arranged by B. Parker and Marc Lanjean; and has been performed by artists such as Miriam Makeba and Tom Jones
- A similarly titled Finnish translation "Kielletyt leikit" ("Forbidden Games") was one of the signature songs of Carola and the opening track of her debut album.
- Mireille Mathieu has performed a two vocal versions; one in French (title: "Amour Défendu") and one in German (title: "Walzer der Liebe")
- Ginette Reno has also performed a vocal version, titled Forbidden Games.
- Los Niños de Sara, Alabina's French gypsy musicians, did a flamenco version called "Romance Anonimo".
- Juan Serrano and Leonardo Áñez also did a flamenco version under "Romance Flamenco".
- Ruggiero Ricci arranged and performed a version for solo violin, titled "Spanish Ballad".

== Bibliography ==
- Herrera, Francisco, Enciclopedia de la Guitarra (Spanish), Piles, Editorial de Música / Valencia, 2004. ISBN 978-84-95026-80-4
