= Mystery in Love =

1993 single by Yōko Oginome

Single by Yōko Oginome
- Language: Japanese
- B-side: "Born to Be Wild"
- Released: December 1, 1994
- Recorded: 1993
- Genre: J-pop; dance-pop
- Label: Victor
- Songwriters: Hinoky Team; Kayoko Ono
- Producer: Keiichi Takahashi

Yōko Oginome singles chronology
"Passages of Time (Hot New Version)" (1993)	"Mystery in Love" (1994)	"Kyō kara Hajime yō" (1994)

Music video
- "Mystery in Love" on YouTube

"Mystery in Love" (ミステリー・イン・ラブ, Misuterī in Rabu) is the 31st single by Japanese singer Yōko Oginome. Written by Hinoky Team and Kayoko Ono, the single was released on December 1, 1993, by Victor Entertainment.

== Background and release ==
"Mystery in Love" is a Japanese-language cover of the Juliet (Alessandra Mirka Gatti) song "Heart on Fire", which was released on the 1993 compilation album Maharaja Night HI-NRG Revolution 06 by the label A-Beat C. It was later covered by Virginelle (Elena Gobbi Frattini) as "Mystery in Love" on her 1993 album Hot Love & Emotion.

The song was used as an image song for Phoenix Resorts' Seagaia Ocean Dome.

The B-side, "Born to Be Wild", is a Japanese-language cover of the Eurobeat song "Born to Be Wild/Edo", with lyrics written by Oginome.

== Track listing ==
All music is composed by Hinoky Team; all music is arranged by Keiichi Takahashi.

No.	Title	Lyrics	Length
1.	"Mystery in Love"	Kayoko Ono; Hinoky Team
2.	"Born to Be Wild"	Yōko Oginome; Hinoky Team
3.	"Mystery in Love" (Original Karaoke)
4.	"Born to Be Wild" (Original Karaoke)
