= Romance (Yōko Oginome song) =

1993 single by Yōko Oginome

Single by Yōko Oginome

from the album History
- Language: Japanese
- B-side: "Kuroi Hitomi"
- Released: August 21, 1993
- Recorded: 1993
- Genre: J-pop
- Label: Victor
- Songwriters: Toyohisa Araki; Traditional
- Producer: Edison

Yōko Oginome singles chronology
"Tokyo Girl (Club Mix Version)" (1993)	"Romance" (1993)	"Passages of Time (Hot New Version)" (1993)

Music video
- "Romance" on YouTube

"Romance" (ロマンセ, Romanse) is the 29th single by Japanese singer Yōko Oginome. Written by Toyohisa Araki, the single was released on August 21, 1993 by Victor Entertainment.

== Background and release ==
The song is an adaptation of "Romance Anónimo", a traditional Spanish guitar piece that was made famous as the main theme of the 1952 French film Forbidden Games. It was used by Nissan for their Laurel commercial.

The B-side, "Kuroi Hitomi", is an adaptation of "Dark Eyes", a traditional Russian romance song that was made famous by Julio Iglesias as the song "Nathalie".

"Romance" peaked at No. 47 on Oricon's singles chart and sold over 33,000 copies.

== Track listing ==
All lyrics are written by Toyohisa Araki, all music is arranged by Edison.

No.	Title	Music	Length
1.	"Romance" (Romanse (ロマンセ))	Traditional ("Romance Anónimo")
2.	"Kuroi Hitomi" ((黒い瞳; "Dark Eyes"))	Traditional ("Dark Eyes")
3.	"Romance (Original Karaoke)" ((ロマンセ(オリジナル・カラオケ)))
4.	"Kuroi Hitomi (Original Karaoke)" ((黒い瞳(オリジナル・カラオケ); "Dark Eyes (Original Karaoke)"))

== Charts ==
Chart (1993)	Peak position
Oricon Weekly Singles Chart	47
