= Johnny Frigo's DNA Exposed! =

Studio album by Johnny Frigo
- Released: 2001
- Recorded: April 25–26, 2001
- Studio: Nola Studios, New York City
- Genre: Jazz, swing
- Length: 60:20
- Label: Arbors
- Producer: Mat Domber, Rachel Domber

Johnny Frigo chronology
Live at the Floating Jazz Festival (1999)	Johnny Frigo's DNA Exposed! (2001)	Hot Club of 52nd Street (2004)

Professional ratings
Review scores
Source	Rating
Allmusic	4.5/5 stars
The Penguin Guide to Jazz Recordings	3/4 stars

Johnny Frigo's DNA Exposed! is an album by jazz violinist Johnny Frigo that was released by Arbors.

== Track listing ==
1. I Concentrate on You (4:53)
2. Poor Butterfly (4:51)
3. Cheek to Cheek (4:37)
4. What Is There to Say? (3:33)
5. Nobody Else But Me (6:01)
6. Try a Little Tenderness/Sweet Lovely (5:48)
7. Hair on the G-String (4:32)
8. I Love You (2:52)
9. Too Late Now/Street of Dreams (6:22)
10. She Loves Me (2:44)
11. Crystal Silence (6:51)
12. Tanga (4:48)
13. What'll I Do? (2:28)

== Personnel ==
- Johnny Frigo – violin
- Bill Charlap – piano
- Bucky Pizzarelli – guitar
- Frank Vignola – guitar
- Nicki Parrott – double bass
- Joe Ascione – drums
