= Out of Nowhere (Harold Fethe album) =

Studio album by Harold Fethe
- Released: 2006-01-01
- Recorded: July and September 2004
- Genre: Swing; Gypsy jazz
- Label: Southport Records
- Producer: Bradley Parker-Sparrow, Joanie Pallatto

Professional ratings
Review scores
Source	Rating
Allmusic	link

Out of Nowhere is the debut album by jazz guitarist Harold Fethe, who performs on this outing in the style of Django Reinhardt. Accompanying him is the legendary Johnny Frigo on violin, who like Fethe got a late start with his own career.

== Track listing ==
1. "Out of Nowhere" (6:23)
2. "Cuenca Mercado" (4:02)
3. "Take the "A" Train" (6:27)
4. "There Is No Greater Love" (4:12)
5. "Detour Ahead" (5:24)
6. "It Might as Well Be Spring" (3:48)
7. "You and the Night and the Music" (5:00)
8. "Softly, as in a Morning Sunrise" (5:24)
9. "You Are My Sunshine" (4:14)
10. "September in the Rain" (5:28)
11. "This Masquerade" (5:21)
12. "Alexander's Ragtime Band" (4:56)

== Personnel ==
- Harold Fethe – guitar
- Johnny Frigo – violin
- Jim Cox – double-bass
- Joe Vito – piano, accordion
- Joanie Pallatto – vocals
