= Carola Standertskjöld =

Carola
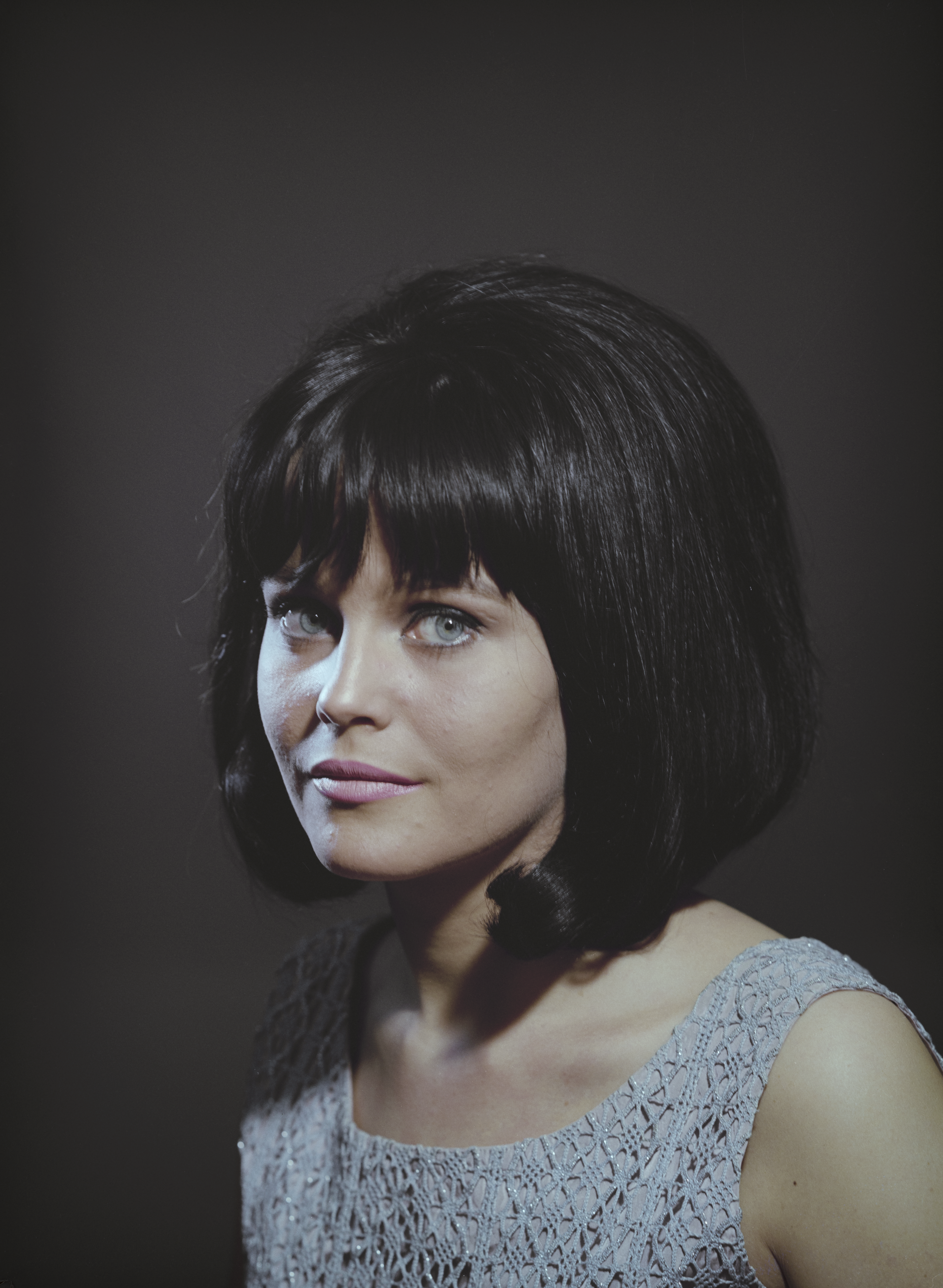
- Carola in 1965

Background information
- Born: Carola Christina Standertskjöld; 23 March 1941
- Origin: Helsinki, Finland
- Died: 12 November 1997 (aged 56) Kirkkonummi
- Genres: Jazz; pop; soul
- Occupation: Singer
- Years active: 1962–1989
- Labels: RCA; Decca; Warner; Jazzpuu

Carola Christina Standertskjöld-Liemola (23 March 1941 – 12 November 1997), professionally known as Carola, was a Finnish jazz and pop singer. Her style was partially inspired by American singers of the 1950s. Simultaneously, it was in the spirit of the modal jazz scene going down in Europe in the 1960s. Mostly, Carola's jazz repertoire consisted in idiosyncratic versions of American songs in English, while her most famous jazz track "The Flame" was an original composition by Esa Pethman and the lyrics by the singer herself. As the vocalist for Esa Pethman's quartet and Hazy Osterwald's sextet in the early 1960s, Carola made fame in Finland and Sweden, and toured Poland, Czechoslovakia, and Switzerland. Her most significant recording is a session with the Heikki Sarmanto Trio from 1966, which the Finnish Music Information Centre considers among the original blueprints of Finnish jazz. Carola's recordings have been credited for the accosting tone of her contralto voice and her phrasing. The singer also co-produced the groovy approach of her supporting orchestras. In late 1960s and early 1970s, she performed in nine languages and a wide variety of styles, including chanson, schlager, Latin, rock'n'roll, and soul. After her death of Alzheimer's disease in 1997, Carola's music was revived in 2004 with two Best of albums and Carola & Heikki Sarmanto Trio reaching the Finnish charts.

== Biography ==
Carola Christina Standertskjöld was born on 23 March 1941 to Elin Christina Fazer and Johan Standertskjöld, into a Swedish-speaking noble family in Helsinki. They left the harsh Finnish post-war conditions and settled in Switzerland. From a very young age Carola was interested in learning foreign languages. Later her family moved to Spain, where her first public jazz performance took place; she also performed the French chansons at school parties and small occasions, accompanying herself on the acoustic guitar.

=== Jazz career (1962–1966) ===
When Carola returned to Finland, she was spotted by Esa and Anssi Pethman, brothers who led a jazz quarter that was popular in Finland and Sweden in 1962. As the lead singer of Esa Pethman's quartet, Carola gained fame in Sweden, Poland and Czechoslovakia in 1963 and released her first track in Finland.: the Jewish folk song "Hava Nagila", published by the RCA as the B-side of Laila Halme's version of "Telstar".

After leaving Esa Pethman's quartet Carola became the vocalist for the Swiss Hazy Osterwald Sextet. During 1964 she toured the Central European scene and performed on television programs. Returning to Finland in 1965, Carola released a single in German, "Warum Willst Du Das Alles Vergessen" and also performed with a backup band, The Boys, who mostly recorded cover versions of songs in the English language, including The Rolling Stones' "The Last Time" and Skeeter Davis' "The End of the World". Carola starred both as a singer and actress in the musical television film The Cold Old Days, with the film winning the Golden Rose of the Montreaux Film Festival. Her performances in the film included a cover of Manos Hadjidakis's song "All Alone Am I", for which she herself composed the French lyrics.

In 1966, Carola returned to performing jazz music. As the vocalist of the Heikki Sarmanto Trio, she gave a number of concerts in Finland and recorded a session in the studios of Yle on 5 June 1966. Yle considered the material as uncommercial, aired the tracks once on Finnish radio, and shelved them.

=== Pop career (1967–1975) ===
Carola's popularity in Finland peaked with her interpretations of the songs "Hunajainen", "Kielletyt leikit", "Agua de Beber", "Rakkauden jälkeen", "Jerusalem", "Mä lähden stadiin", and the traditional Finnish song "Herrojen kanssa pellon laidassa". She also covered 3 winning songs from the Eurovision Song Contest ("La, la, la" 1968, "Un banc, un arbre, une rue" 1971, "Après Toi" 1972). In 1969, Carola tried out rhythm & blues, recording a television video of Aretha Franklin's "Chain of Fools". The tongue-in-cheek choreography by Heikki Värtsi included girl group dancing and Carola whipping a man in a cave. Her rhythm & blues covers continued with the television videos of Elaine Brown's "Seize the Time" and "The End of Silence" (in Finnish as "Sanaton hiljaisuus").

=== Retirement (1975–1997) ===
In the mid-1970s, tired of living constantly in the public eye, Carola retired from the music industry and concentrated on work in her husband Georg Liemola's vegetable wholesale company. Throughout the 1970s, she made selected appearances at jazz clubs in Helsinki, including performances with the UMO Jazz Orchestra. Carola made a comeback in 1980 by publishing the Latin style album Maria, Maria, receiving a golden record certificate in Finland. After that, she refused to appear to audiences. In 1985, Carola was diagnosed with Alzheimer's disease. In 1987, Carola gave an exclusive concert with the UMO Jazz Orchestra and two years later one with pianist Iiro Rantala. In the early 1990s, she performed alone at a few charity concerts. After her long battle with the disease, Carola died on 12 November 1997 in Kirkkonummi.

== Artistry ==
On stage, Carola concentrated to singing fully and living with the music, usually oblivious of her audience. The Finnish public usually reacted to her concentrated act, accusing her of being drunk. Carola enjoyed being on stage, but after her shows she usually felt depressed by and unsatisfied with her voice and performance.

=== Jazz singer ===
Carola had a deep voice and an accosting manner without frills, concentrated on the phrasing. Her storytelling technique was accompanied by the grooviness of her supporting orchestras, co-produced by her. Partially, the style was inspired by American jazz singers of the 1950s. Simultaneously, it was in the spirit of the modal jazz scene going down in Europe in the 1960s. Mostly, Carola's jazz repertoire consisted in idiosyncratic versions of American songs. Examples include "Just Give Me Time" by Francy Boland and Jimmy Woode, "So Long, Big Time" by Dory Langdon and Harold Arlen, and "Lonely Woman" by Margo Guryan and Ornette Coleman. Carola's most famous track in the genre was the swinging "The Flame" composed and arranged by Esa Pethman and lyrics by Carola herself.

=== Pop singer ===
Using her international experience, Carola performed in nine languages, including Finnish, Swedish, German, French, Italian, English, and Spanish. She interpreted chanson, schlager, jazz, blues, soul, and folk music.

== Personal life ==
Carola felt exhausted by the attention of the Finnish press at her private life. Her favourite activities were various physical exercises, including walking, yachting, and driving. Her kilometrage was usually 5,000 km/month. Carola admitted consuming "a fair deal" of alcoholic beverages in her youth, quitting later in her life. She smoked 2–3 packages of cigarettes per day. She reportedly considered herself a "terribly lazy" person for not learning to play any instruments. She reportedly spoke five languages: Swedish, Finnish, French, Italian, and English.

== Legacy ==
In 1998, Carola's song "Armonaikaa" was used as the closing credits theme of the Prix Europa Special winning film Hardly a Butterfly. In 2004, the double CD Parhaat (The Best) was released, ending up as the No. 15 on the chart of best-selling Finnish albums of the year in Finland with 27,100 copies sold. This caused a revival of Carola's music in Finland. Her 1966 recording session with Heikki Sarmanto Trio was published in the same year. Carola & Heikki Sarmanto Trio featured 10 songs from the YLE studio sessions, and 4 live performances from the YLE Jazz Concert at Kulttuuritalo concert hall in Helsinki 28 April 1966. The album stayed in the Finnish charts for ten weeks. The Finnish Music Information Centre considers the Heikki Sarmanto Trio among the original blueprints of Finnish jazz. The album was also issued in Germany to a lauding review by the Nordische Musik website.

A biographical play Kielletyt leikit (Forbidden Games), named after the title of the singer's version of the Spanish tune "Romance" and based on Carola's life, ran for a month in the Frenckell theatre of Tampere in 2009.

== Similar artists ==
As listed by the Dusty Groove music store:

- Karin Krog
- Monica Zetterlund

== Discography ==
- Kielletyt leikit (1970)
- Carola (1975)
- Maria, Maria (1980)
- Parhaat palat (1980)
- Sydämeen jäi soimaan blues (1985)
- Kielletyt leikit (1993)
- 20 suosikkia – Rakkauden jälkeen (1997)
- 20 suosikkia – Kielletyt leikit (1997)
- 20 suosikkia – Ota tai jätä (2000)
- Musiikin tähtihetkiä (2001)
- Carola & Heikki Sarmanto Trio (2004)
- Parhaat: tulkitsijan taival (2004)
- Parhaat: tulkitsijan taival 2 (2005)
- Rakkauden jälkeen – Kaikki levytykset ja arkistojen aarteita 1963–1988
