= Live at the Floating Jazz Festival (Johnny Frigo album) =

Live album by Johnny Frigo Quartet
- Released: August 24, 1999
- Recorded: November 2, 1997, to November 6, 1997
- Venue: SS Norway, Caribbean Sea
- Genre: Jazz, swing
- Length: 68:05
- Label: Chiaroscuro
- Producer: Johnny Frigo

Johnny Frigo Quartet chronology
Debut of a Legend (1994)	Live at the Floating Jazz Festival (1999)	Johnny Frigo's DNA Exposed! (2001)

Professional ratings
Review scores
Source	Rating
Allmusic	4/5 stars
The Penguin Guide to Jazz Recordings	3/4 stars

Live at the Floating Jazz Festival is a live album by jazz violinist Johnny Frigo.

== Track listing ==
1. My Romance (5:35)
2. Porgy and Bess Medley (8:16)
3. My Favorite Things (4:17)
4. There Will Never Be Another You (4:42)
5. Detour Ahead (5:43)
6. Man I Love/Iv'e Got a Crush on You/Liza/Strike Up the Band (8:16)
7. My Foolish Heart (5:46)
8. It Might as Well Be Spring (9:04)
9. This Can't Be Love (5:16)
10. Isn't It Romantic (6:05)
11. Lester Leaps In (5:00)

== Personnel ==
- Joe Vito – piano
- Johnny Frigo – violin
- Rob Thomas – violin
- Terry Gibbs – vibraphone
- Larry Gray – double bass
- Rick Frigo – drums
