= Scandal (Yōko Oginome album) =

Studio album by Yōko Oginome
- Released: December 16, 1994
- Recorded: 1994
- Genre: J-pop; pop rock
- Length: 42:47
- Language: Japanese
- Label: Victor
- Producer: Rod Antoon

Yōko Oginome chronology
De-Luxe (1993)	Scandal (1994)	History (1995)

Music video
- "Scandal" on YouTube

Scandal (スキャンダル, Skyandaru) is the 15th studio album by Japanese singer/songwriter Yōko Oginome. Released through Victor Entertainment on December 16, 1994, the album was produced by Rod Antoon and features songs composed by Yūko Ishikawa, with Oginome co-writing three of them. While no singles were generated from this album, "Sha-La-La" was included as the B-side of the single "Koi no Hallelujah". The album was reissued on May 26, 2010, with six bonus tracks as part of Oginome's 25th anniversary celebration.

The album peaked at No. 97 on Oricon's albums chart and sold over 5,000 copies.

== Track listing ==
All lyrics are written by Yūko Ishikawa, except where indicated; all music is composed by Yūko Ishikawa, except where indicated; all tracks are arranged by Rod Antoon, except where indicated.

No.	Title	Lyrics	Music	Length
1.	"Sha-La-La"	Yōko Oginome		3:46
2.	"Koi wa Peacock Paradise" ((恋は Peacock Paradise; "Love Is a Peacock Paradise"))			4:33
3.	"Kuchibiru Kasanete mo" ((くちびる重ねても; "Even If My Lips are Sealed"))	Oginome		4:03
4.	"Futaridake no Harmony" ((二人だけの Harmony; "A Harmony for Only Two People"))	Oginome		3:49
5.	"Kaze no Yōni, Tsubasa no Yō ni" ((風のように、翼のように; "Like the Wind, Like the Wings"))			4:05
6.	"Mōichido I Love You" ((もう一度 I love you; "I Love You Once More"))			4:20
7.	"Keiseifuri demo Itoshiteru" ((形勢不利でも愛してる; "I Love You Regardless of Your Faults"))			4:33
8.	"Don't Forget Maria"		Ishikawa; Jory Levine	3:58
9.	"Jeanne d'Arc no Nageki" (Jannu daruku no nageki (ジャンヌダルクの嘆き; "Joan of Arc's Mourning"))			3:46
10.	"Scandal"	Oginome		4:37
11.	"Kaze no Yōni, Tsubasa no Yō ni (a Cappella Version)" ((風のように、翼のように(a cappella version); "Like the Wind, Like the Wings"))			1:10
Total length:				42:47

2010 bonus tracks
No.	Title	Lyrics	Music	Arrangement	Length
12.	"Koi no Hallelujah" (Koi no Hareruya (恋のハレルヤ; "Love Hallelujah"))	Rei Nakanishi	Kunihiko Suzuki	Fumio Okui	3:38
13.	"Shiawase e no Jikan" ((幸福への時間; "Time for Happiness"))	Chika Ueda	Ueda	Akihiko Matsumoto	4:35
14.	"If You Love Me Now (Aishisa ni Sarawarete)" ((IF YOU LOVE ME NOW ~愛しさにさらわれて~; "If You Love Me Now (Being Kidnapped by Love)"))	Natsumi Watanabe; Giancarlo Pasquini	Andrea Leonardi; Pasquini	Takayuki Hijikata	5:12
15.	"Ashita wa Hareru!" ((明日は晴れる!; "It Will Be Fine Tomorrow!"))	Watanabe	Tetsurō Oda	Oda	4:05
16.	"Heartbreaker"	Yō Sorano	Oda	Hiroshi Matsui	4:04
17.	"Hoshi no Skate" (Hoshi no Sukēto (星のスケート; "Star Skating"))	Toshiyuki Arakawa	Hiroaki Nakamura	Nakamura	2:26
Total length:					24:02

== Charts ==
Chart (1994)	Peak position
Japanese Albums (Oricon)	97
