= Who's on First? (album) =

Live album by Bob Dorough and Dave Frishberg
- Released: 2000
- Recorded: 5–7 November 1999
- Venue: Jazz Bakery, Hollywood, Los Angeles
- Genre: Traditional pop, jazz
- Length: 56:43
- Label: Blue Note 7243 5 23403 2 3

Who's on First? is a live 2000 vocal album by the songwriters Bob Dorough and Dave Frishberg. It was recorded at the Jazz Bakery in Los Angeles.

Dorough and Frishberg had been friends for several decades prior to this recording and had written the song "I'm Hip" together in 1965. The pair were persuaded to perform as a duo by the owner of the Jazz Bakery club, Ruth Price, and this live album was made of their collaboration. The opening song and title track, "Who's on First?" is about the problem of deciding which of the pair should perform first in the show.

The pair performed using two grand pianos that faced each other on the stage. Each performed four solo songs with the rest recorded in duet.

== Reception ==
Professional ratings
Review scores
Source	Rating
Allmusic	4/5 stars

Scott Yanow reviewed the album for Allmusic and wrote that Dorough and Frishberg " ... have a lot in common. Both are swinging pianists, likable vocalists that do not have conventional voices, and superb lyricists with very original wits" and that the album was "a fun CD that lives up to its potential".

Jim Santella reviewed the album for All About Jazz, writing of Dorough and Frishberg, "What individuals! As songwriters, both have come up with memorable keepers" and that the album was " ... an overview from both of these not-to-be-missed songsters, herald[ing] the work of two very different jazz singers. Both Dorough and Frishberg represent tongue-in-cheek hipster humor while maintaining excellent musical standards throughout".

== Track listing ==
1. "Who's on First" (Dave Frishberg) – 3:43
2. "Lookin' Good" (Frishberg) – 3:04
3. "Too Long in L.A." (Frishberg) – 4:22
4. "You Are There" (Frishberg, Johnny Mandel) – 2:42
5. Intro: The Underdog – 1:23
6. "The Underdog" (Frishberg) – 3:45
7. Intro: Where You At? – 0:27
8. "Where You At?" (George Handy, Jack Segal) – 3:46
9. "Health Food Nut" (Bob Dorough, Don Nelson) – 4:12
10. "Devil May Care" (Dorough) – 3:28
11. "Nothing Like You" (Dorough, Fran Landesman) – 4:57
12. "Hong Kong Blues" (Hoagy Carmichael) – 3:20
13. Intro: I'm Hip – 1:29
14. "I'm Hip" (Dorough, Frishberg) – 3:59
15. "At the Saturday Dance" (Dorough, Frishberg) – 5:00
16. "Conjunction Junction" (Dorough) – 4:13
17. "Rockin' in Rhythm" (Harry Carney, Duke Ellington, Irving Mills) – 2:53

== Personnel ==
- Bob Dorough and Dave Frishberg – piano, vocals
- Bob Blumenthal – liner notes
- Ruth Price – announcer
- Burton Yount – art direction, design
- Gordon H. Jee – creative director
- Kent Heckman – editing, mixing
- Kurt Lundvall – mastering
- Cynthia Levine – photography
- Mantis Evar – product manager
- Bill Goodwin – production
