= Dave Frishberg =

American jazz musician (1933–2021)

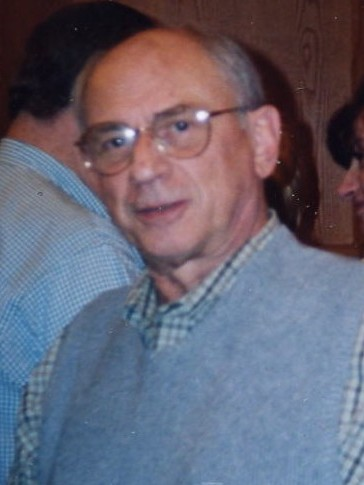
- Frishberg in 2005

Background information
- Born: March 23, 1933; Saint Paul, Minnesota, U.S.
- Died: November 17, 2021 (aged 88) Portland, Oregon, U.S.
- Genres: Jazz, vocal jazz, swing
- Occupations: Musician, composer
- Instruments: Piano, vocals
- Labels: Arbors, Blue Note/EMI

David Lee Frishberg (March 23, 1933 – November 17, 2021) was an American jazz pianist, vocalist, composer, and lyricist. His songs have been performed by Blossom Dearie, Rosemary Clooney, Shirley Horn, Anita O'Day, Michael Feinstein, Irene Kral, Diana Krall, Rebecca Kilgore, Stacey Kent, Bette Midler, John Pizzarelli, Jessica Molaskey, and Mel Tormé.

Frishberg wrote the music and lyrics for "I'm Just a Bill", the song about the forlorn legislative writ in the ABC Schoolhouse Rock! series, which was later transformed into the revue Schoolhouse Rock Live. For Schoolhouse Rock! he also wrote and performed "Walkin' on Wall Street", a song describing how the stock market works, and "$7.50 Once a Week", a song about saving money and balancing a budget.

== Biography ==
David Lee Frishberg was born on March 23, 1933, in Saint Paul, Minnesota. Frishberg resisted learning classical piano as a boy, developing an interest in blues and boogie-woogie by listening to recordings by Pete Johnson and Jay McShann. As a teenager, he played in the house band at the Flame in St. Paul where Art Tatum, Billie Holiday, and Johnny Hodges appeared. After graduating from the University of Minnesota as a journalism major in 1955, Frishberg spent two years in the Air Force.

In 1957, Frishberg moved to New York City, where he played solo piano at the Duplex in Greenwich Village. He first became known for his work with Carmen McRae, Ben Webster, Gene Krupa, Bud Freeman, Eddie Condon, Al Cohn, and Zoot Sims. Later, he was celebrated for writing and performing his own, frequently humorous songs, including favorites "I'm Hip" (lyrics only, in collaboration with Bob Dorough), "Blizzard of Lies", "My Attorney Bernie", "Do You Miss New York", "Peel Me a Grape", "Quality Time", "Slappin' the Cakes on Me", "I Want To Be A Sideman", and "Van Lingle Mungo", whose lyrics consist entirely of the names of old-time baseball players.

In 1971, Frishberg moved to Los Angeles where he worked as a studio musician, and where he also recorded his first albums. In 1986, he moved to Portland, Oregon.

Frishberg cited songwriter Frank Loesser as an influence, and has said that Loesser's "Baby, It's Cold Outside", along with Willie Nelson's "Crazy", are songs he wished he had written. Like Loesser before him, Frishberg has also worked strictly as a lyricist, collaborating with composers Johnny Mandel, Alan Broadbent, Al Cohn, Blossom Dearie, David Shire, Julius Wechter, Dan Barrett, Bob Brookmeyer, Bob Dorough, Gerry Mulligan, and Johnny Hodges.

Frishberg was nominated 4 times for Grammy awards for Best Jazz Vocals. Rolling Stone India included two of his recordings for their series of jazz playlists in the category of "lyrics worth paying attention to": "My Attorney Bernie" (sung by Blossom Dearie) and "I Want To Be a Sideman" (performed by Frishberg). He was the co-recipient of the Golden Raspberry Award for Worst Original Song in 1981, having written the lyric to "Baby Talk" from the Burt Reynolds comedy film Paternity.

== Personal ==
Frishberg was a longtime baseball fan, and had been a member of the Society for American Baseball Research (SABR) since 1984. In addition to "Van Lingle Mungo", he also wrote "Matty", a tribute to 20th century pitching great Christy Mathewson, which was included along with "Play Ball" and several other songs with baseball references, on the 1994 CD Quality Time.

Frishberg died on November 17, 2021, in Portland, Oregon, at the age of 88.

== Discography ==
- Oklahoma Toad (CTI, 1970)
- Solo And Trio (Seeds, 1974)
- Getting Some Fun Out of Life (Concord Jazz, 1977)
- You're a Lucky Guy (Concord Jazz, 1978)
- The Dave Frishberg Songbook Volume No. 1 (Omni Sound, 1981)
- The Dave Frishberg Songbook Volume No. 2 (Omni Sound, 1983)
- Live at Vine Street (Fantasy, 1985)
- Can't Take You Nowhere (Fantasy, 1987)
- Let's Eat Home (Concord Jazz, 1990)
- Dave Frishberg Classics (Concord Jazz, 1981)
- Where You At? (Sterling, 1991)
- Double Play with Jim Goodwin (Arbors, 1993)
- Quality Time (Sterling, 1994)
- Looking at You with Rebecca Kilgore (PHD Music, 1994)
- Not a Care in the World with Rebecca Kilgore (Arbors, 1997)
- By Himself (Arbors, 1998)
- Knäck Mig En Nöt with Vänner (Gazell, 1998)
- Who's On First? with Bob Dorough (Blue Note, 2000)
- The Starlit Hour with Rebecca Kilgore (Arbors, 2001)
- Do You Miss New York? Live at Jazz at Lincoln Center (Arbors, 2003)
- Dave Frishberg at The Jazz Bakery: Retromania (Arbors, 2005)
- Why Fight the Feeling with Rebecca Kilgore (Arbors, 2008)
- House Concert with Karen Krog (Arbors, 2010)
- Jessica Molasky and Dave Frishberg at the Algonquin (Arbors, 2012)

=== As sideman ===
- Jimmy Rushing, Livin' the Blues (BluesWay, 1968)
- Herb Alpert & The Tijuana Brass, You Smile – The Song Begins (A&M, 1974)
- Herb Alpert & The T.J.B., Coney Island (A&M, 1975)
- Ray Linn, Empty Suit Blues (Discovery, 1981)
- Dick Sudhalter, Friends with Pleasure (Audiophile, 1981)
- Pee Wee Russell, Over the Rainbow (Xanadu, 1982)
- Ben Webster, Valentine's Day 1964 Live (Dot Time, 2018)
