= Jessica Molaskey =

- Born: January 9, 1962 (age 64); Wolcott, Connecticut, US
- Genres: Vocal; show tunes; torch songs
- Occupation: Singer
- Labels: Center Stage Records; Arbors
- Website: www.jessicamolaskey.com

Jessica Molaskey (born January 9, 1962) is an American professional actress and singer. Jessica most recently appeared in the Off Broadway production of The Connector at the MCC Theater Company for which she was nominated for a Lucille Lortel Award and Outer Critics Circle Award. She has appeared in almost a dozen Broadway shows, including Sunday in the Park with George, Parade, Dream, Tommy, Les Miserables, Crazy for You, Chess, Oklahoma!, Cats, City of Angels, and the first national tour of Joseph and the Amazing Technicolor Dreamcoat. In 2025, she's set to portray Miss Jane in the Broadway premiere of Floyd Collins opposite Jeremy Jordan.

She recently created the role of Alma in the world premiere of the musical adaptation of Midnight in the Garden of Good and Evil written by Jason Robert Brown and Taylor Mac at the Goodman Theater in Chicago.

She has premiered theater pieces Off-Broadway, including the Jason Robert Brown 1995 musical Songs for a New World, A Man of No Importance at Lincoln Center, Dream True at the Vineyard Theatre, Stephen Sondheim's Wise Guys (New York Theatre Workshop), The Most Happy Fella as part of the Encores! series at City Center and many world premieres in regional theaters across the US. Molaskey performed the role of Sister Bertha in NBC's The Sound of Music Live! starring Carrie Underwood. Her voice was featured in the film version of Chicago.

She has performed in concert all over the world from Carnegie Hall to Disney Hall and in jazz festivals from Montreal to Monterey. She and her husband John Pizzarelli have performed at the famed Cafe Carlyle for nearly two decades, which Stephen Holden described in the New York Times as, "The premier nightclub act of our time. Caviar in a world of canned Tuna!" She has recorded six solo albums: Pentimento, A Good Day, Make Believe, Sitting in Limbo, A Kiss to Build a Dream On, and Portraits of Joni. Her songwriting skills can be heard on dozens of recordings, including "Cradle and All" which she wrote with Ricky Ian Gordon for Audra McDonald's Build a Bridge album and "The Greedy Tadpole", part of a commission for McDonald of the Seven Deadly Sins for Carnegie Hall. Her concert Portraits of Joni, as part Lincoln Center's American Songbook series, featured her daughter Madeleine Pizzarelli on guitar and vocals.

Molaskey has a weekly radio program called Radio Deluxe which airs in 60 cities across America and Canada which she records with her husband jazz guitarist John Pizzarelli.

== Discography ==
| Released | Album | Label |
|---|---|---|
| June 4, 2002 | Pentimento | PS Classics |
| May 20, 2003 | A Good Day | PS Classics |
| October 5, 2004 | Make Believe | PS Classics |
| May 8, 2007 | Sitting in Limbo | PS Classics |
| September 2, 2008 | A Kiss to Build a Dream On | Arbors |
| August 14, 2012 | At the Algonquin | Arbors |
| June 13, 2017 | Portraits of Joni | Ghostlight Records |
