= Yuka Koide =

Japanese actress, model, and entertainer (born 1985)

- 小出 由華
- Born: January 5, 1985 (age 41); Katsushika, Tokyo, Japan
- Other names: Ruga-chan (ルーガちゃん, Rūga-chan)
- Occupations: Actress; model; entertainer
- Agent: Geiei
- Height: 1.65 m (5 ft 5 in)
- Children: 2

Yuka Koide (小出 由華, Koide Yuka; born January 5, 1985) is a Japanese actress, model, and entertainer who is represented by Geiei.

== Biography ==
Koide was born in Katsushika, Tokyo, and was a child actress. From 1992 to 1994, she appeared as Ruga-chan in Ugo Ugo Ruga and was awarded a silver medal in 1993. In 1997, Koide barely did any entertainment activities due to junior high school. She later returned to her entertainment career in 2005. After returning to stage shows and dramas, Koide began working as an actress in films. On October 3, 2006, she became Hayamimi Musume in "Hayamimi Trend No.1" in Mezamashi TV.

On 2012, Koide studied abroad in Denmark. She later married an employee from a Danish company in 2015.

== Filmography ==
=== TV series ===
Dramas

Year	Title	Role	Network	Notes
1989	Aitsu ga Trouble		Fuji TV	
1990	Special Rescue Police Winspector	Yuka	TV Asahi	Episode 34
1991	Chōjin Sentai Jetman	Kaori Rokumeikan (child)	TV Asahi	Episode 19
1992	Chibi Maruko-chan		NHK	
1992	Special Rescue Exceedraft	Akane	TV Asahi	Episode 1
1993	Getsuyō Drama Special		TBS	
1994	Aogeba Tōtoshi		Fuji TV	Episode 2
1994	Good Mourning		Fuji TV	
1995	Heart ni S		Fuji TV	
1996	Minikui Ahiru no ko	Miwako Ishihara	Fuji TV	
1996	Futari no Seesaw Game	Izumi Osawa	TBS	
1997	Ultraman Tiga	Asami	MBS	Episode 32
1997	B-Robo Kabutack	Sayuri Mitaka	TV Asahi	
2001	Shin Tenmadetodoke		TBS	
2002	Kabe Giwa Zeimu-kan		Fuji TV	
2003	Hama no Shizuka wa Jiken ga o Suki		Fuji TV	
2003	Ofukuro Series		Fuji TV	Episode 18
2003	Hito Natsu no Papa e		TBS	Episode 1
2007	Part-time Saibankan		TBS	
2010	Tenshi no Dairinin		THK	Episode 3
2013	Mischievous Kiss: Love in Tokyo		Fuji TV Two	

Variety series

Year	Title	Network	Notes
1992	Ugo Ugo Ruga	Fuji TV	
1993	Downtown no Gottsu Ee Kanji	Fuji TV	
1994	Dō Natteru no?!	Fuji TV	
1994	Kazemakase Shin Shokoku Man'yū-ki	Fuji TV	
1994	Tabi Kurabe Ketteihan	ABC	
1994	Ohayō! Nice Day	Fuji TV	
1996	Ken Shimura no Baka Tonosama	Fuji TV	
1996	Shūkan Stamina Tengoku	Fuji TV	
2006	Otoko Obasan	Fuji TV	
2006	Quiz Presen Variety Q-sama!!	TV Asahi	
2006	Gachinko Shichō-ritsu Battle	TV Asahi	
2006	Mezamashi TV	Fuji TV	Hayamimi Musume
2006	Mecha-Mecha Iketeru!	Fuji TV	
2006	Tenshi Ranman	MBS	
2007	Sanma's Karakuri-TV	TBS	
2007	Otakara TV Deluxe	NHK BS-2	
2007	Waratte Iitomo!	Fuji TV	
2007	Chō V.I.P.	Fuji TV	
2007	Kojin Jugyō II	TBS	
2007	Digital Stadium	NHK BS-2	
2007	Obiraji R	TBS	
2007	Chronos	Fuji TV	
2007	Aichiteru!	TBS	
2007	2-ji Chao!	TBS	
2007	Mezamashi Saturday	Fuji TV	
2007	The QuizMan Show	TV Asahi	
2007	Fukui Roman Iiza	FTB	
2007	Mucha-buri!	TBS	
2007	Go-ji ni Muchū!	Tokyo MX	
2008	Shimura & Tokoro no Tatakau Oshōgatsu	TV Asahi	
2008	Ta Kajin Mune-ippai	KTV	
2008	Mirai Kyōju Sawamura	Fuji TV	
2008	Utaban	TBS	
2008	Tutorial no Tu Shite!	KTV	
2008	Zenkoku Issei! Nihonjin Test	Fuji TV	
2009	BS Netchū Yobanashi	NHK BS-2	
2009	Neocolla! Tokyo Kankyō Kaigi	Fuji TV	
2009	Itoshino Shigoto-sama	BS-TBS	
2009	Daitan Map	TV Asahi	
2012	Supamoku!!	TBS	
2012	Watashi no Nani ga Ike Nai no?	TBS	

=== Films ===
Year	Title	Role	Notes
1995	Fuyu no Kappa		
2009	Chikashitsu		
2010	Death Kappa		
2014	Yoshinaka Densetsu Yoshinaka Ana	Daihime	
