= The Brass Are Comin' =

Studio album by Herb Alpert and the Tijuana Brass
- Released: October 1969
- Studio: A&M (Hollywood, California)
- Genre: Jazz pop, easy listening
- Length: 33:35
- Label: A&M
- Producer: Herb Alpert, Jerry Moss

Herb Alpert and the Tijuana Brass chronology
Warm (1969)	The Brass Are Comin' (1969)	Greatest Hits (1970)

The Brass Are Comin' is a 1969 album by Herb Alpert & the Tijuana Brass, the group's 13th release and its last album before disbanding in December 1969. It was the first of the group's albums to not achieve gold certification. However, the album reached No. 30 on the Billboard 200 album chart.

== Background ==
Unlike the previous Warm album, which featured much slower-paced songs leaning more toward a Brazilian sound, The Brass Are Comin' is characterized by a western theme with faster-paced songs. "Good Morning, Mr. Sunshine" became one of the most recognized Tijuana Brass songs from the album, and it was among the last Mexican-flavored songs recorded by the group. After completing this album and the subsequent television special, the group embarked on a European tour that marked the last public performances of the original band.

The album spawned a television special by the same name that aired on NBC on October 29, 1969. Clips from the special can be seen on the album's double-fold cover.

== Critical reception ==
Professional ratings
Review scores
Source	Rating
Allmusic	2/5 stars

In his review for Allmusic, music critic Richard S. Ginell wrote "...stretches of this record reveal a tired group and a leader whose trumpet has lost much of its old zip. Even so, as on all TJB albums, there are several gems."

== Track listing ==
Track	Title	Composers	Time
1	The Brass Are Comin' (The Little Train of Caipira)	Heitor Villa-Lobos	2:06
2	Good Morning, Mr. Sunshine	Alexander F. Roth, Irving Mills	2:36
3	Country Lake	Sol Lake	2:56
4	I'll Be Back	John Lennon, Paul McCartney	3:15
5	Moon River	Henry Mancini, Johnny Mercer	2:55
6	The Maltese Melody	Bert Kaempfert, Herbert Rehbein	2:13
7	Sunny	Bobby Hebb	3:11
8	I'm an Old Cowhand (From the Rio Grande)	Johnny Mercer	2:38
9	Anna	F. Giordano, R. Vatro, William Engvick	2:39
10	Robbers and Cops	Julius Wechter	2:13
11	Moments	John Pisano	2:43
12	You Are My Life	Peter Sarstedt	3:23

== Charts ==
Chart (1969)	Peak position
US Billboard Top LPs	30
