= Yōko Oginome discography =

- Studio albums: 20 (Note: This includes the cover albums.)
- EPs: 1
- Compilation albums: 9
- Singles: 43
- Video albums: 8 (Note: This includes the music video compilation albums and concert DVDs.)
- Remix albums: 2
- Box sets: 2

The discography of the Japanese singer/songwriter Yōko Oginome consists of 17 studio albums, nine compilation albums, and 43 singles released since 1984.

== Albums ==
=== Studio albums ===
Year	Information	Oricon weekly peak position	Sales	RIAJ certification
1984	Teens Romance: Released: September 5, 1984; Label: Victor; Formats: LP, CD, cassette	24	23,000	
1985	Freesia no Ame: Released: March 5, 1985; Label: Victor; Formats: LP, CD, cassette	26	16,000	
1985	Kaigara Terrace: Released: September 5, 1985; Label: Victor; Formats: LP, CD, cassette	27	20,000	
1986	Raspberry Wind: Released: April 21, 1986; Label: Victor; Formats: LP, CD, cassette	4	109,000	
1986	Non-Stopper: Yōko Oginome "The Beat" Special: Released: December 16, 1986; Label: Victor; Formats: LP, CD, cassette	1	691,000	
1987	Route 246 Connexion: Released: July 16, 1987; Label: Victor; Formats: LP, CD, cassette	2	274,000	
1988	CD-Rider: Released: August 24, 1988; Label: Victor; Formats: LP, CD, cassette	1	175,000	
1988	Verge of Love (English Version): Released: December 17, 1988; Label: Victor; Formats: LP, CD, cassette	5	136,000	
1989	Verge of Love (Japanese Version): Released: February 21, 1989; Label: Victor; Formats: LP, CD, cassette	11	52,000	
1989	Fair Tension: Released: November 21, 1989; Label: Victor; Formats: LP, CD, cassette	12	49,000	
1990	Knock on My Door: Released: August 21, 1990; Label: Victor; Formats: CD, cassette	5	46,000	
1991	Trust Me: Released: July 3, 1991; Label: Victor; Formats: CD, cassette	25	23,000	
1992	Ryūkō Kashu: Released: June 3, 1992; Label: Victor; Formats: CD, cassette	3	165,000	
1992	Nudist: Released: November 21, 1992; Label: Victor; Formats: CD, cassette	27	26,000	
1994	Scandal: Released: December 16, 1994; Label: Victor; Formats: CD, cassette	97	5,000	
1997	Chains: Released: December 17, 1997; Label: Victor; Formats: CD, cassette	—		
2023	Bug in a Dress: Released: April 2023; Label: Rising Production; Formats: LP, digital, streaming, CD	—		

=== Extended plays ===
Year	Information	Oricon weekly peak position	Sales	RIAJ certification
1986	Heartbeat Express: Sōshun Monogatari Memorial Album: Released: August 5, 1986; Label: Victor; Formats: EP, CD, cassette	10	42,000	

=== Cover albums ===
Year	Information	Oricon weekly peak position	Sales	RIAJ certification
2006	Voice Nova: Released: February 22, 2006; Label: Victor; Formats: CD	282		
2009	Songs & Voice: Released: November 25, 2009; Label: Victor; Formats: CD	—		
2014	Dear Pop Singer: Released: August 20, 2014; Label: Victor; Formats: CD	38		

=== Compilations ===
Year	Information	Oricon weekly peak position	Sales	RIAJ certification
1985	Yōko Oginome: The Best: Released: December 25, 1985; Label: Victor; Formats: LP, CD, cassette	15	106,000	
1987	CD File Vol. 1: Released: December 16, 1987; Label: Victor; Formats: CD	—		
1987	CD File Vol. 2: Released: December 16, 1987; Label: Victor; Formats: CD	—		
1987	Pop Groover: The Best: Released: December 19, 1987; Label: Victor; Formats: LP, CD, cassette	3	332,000	
1989	CD File Vol. 3: Released: March 21, 1989; Label: Victor; Formats: CD	—		
1990	'91 Oginome Collection: Released: December 16, 1990; Label: Victor; Formats: CD, cassette	29	56,000	
1995	History: Released: June 28, 1995; Label: Victor; Formats: CD, cassette	—		
2005	Yōko Oginome Best Selection: Released: March 24, 2005; Label: Victor; Formats: CD	—		
2009	Golden Best: Released: September 16, 2009; Label: Victor; Formats: CD	117		

=== Box sets ===
Year	Information	Oricon weekly peak position	Sales	RIAJ certification
2009	Super Groover the Box: The Perfect Singles: Released: December 23, 2009; Label: Victor; Formats: CD	178		
2010	Original Album Collection: The Box: Released: March 24, 2010; Label: Victor; Formats: CD	—		

=== Remix albums ===
Year	Information	Oricon weekly peak position	Sales	RIAJ certification
1991	New Take: Best Collections '92: Released: December 16, 1991; Label: Victor; Formats: CD, cassette	48	21,000	
1992	Best Hits Non Stop Clubmix: Released: December 16, 1992; Label: Victor; Formats: CD, cassette	51	15,000	

=== Collaborations ===
Year	Information	Oricon weekly peak position	Sales	RIAJ certification
1993	De-Luxe (Collaboration with Ugo Ugo Lhuga): Released: July 21, 1993; Label: Victor; Formats: CD, cassette	35	19,000	

== Singles ==
List of singles, with selected chart positions
Title	Date	Peak chart positions	Sales (JPN)	RIAJ certification	Album
Title	Date	Oricon Singles Charts	Sales (JPN)	RIAJ certification	Album
"Mirai Kōkai (Sailing)"	April 3, 1984	32	70,000		Teens Romance
"Sayonara kara Hajimaru Monogatari"	July 21, 1984	29	44,000		Teens Romance
"December Memory"	November 5, 1984	39	20,000		Yōko Oginome: The Best
"Mukokuseki Romance"	February 21, 1985	35	27,000		Freesia no Ame
"Koishite Caribbean"	May 21, 1985	24	66,000		Kaigara Terrace
"Kokoro no Mama ni (I'm Just a Lady)"	August 5, 1985	16	68,000		Kaigara Terrace
"Dancing Hero (Eat You Up)"	November 21, 1985	5	324,000	Gold (digital)	Yōko Oginome: The Best
"Flamingo in Paradise"	March 26, 1986	7	146,000		Raspberry Wind
"Dance Beat wa Yoake made"	June 10, 1986	4	148,000		Heartbeat Express: Sōshun Monogatari Memorial Album
"Roppongi Junjōha"	October 29, 1986	3	261,000		Non-Stopper: "The Beat" Special
"Wangan Taiyōzoku"	March 3, 1987	3	162,000		Route 246 Connexion
"Sayonara no Kajitsutachi"	June 21, 1987	1	161,000		Route 246 Connexion
"Kitakaze no Carol"	October 27, 1987	2	117,000		Pop Groover: The Best
"Stranger Tonight"	January 21, 1988	1	143,000		CD-Rider
"Stardust Dream"	April 27, 1988	1	136,000		CD-Rider
"Dear (Cobalt no Kanata e)"	July 21, 1988	2	136,000		CD-Rider
"Verge of Love"	January 18, 1989	5	81,000		Verge of Love (Japanese Version)
"Shōnan Heartbreak"	June 7, 1989	7	72,000		'91 Oginome Collection
"You're My Life"	September 27, 1989	10	59,000		Fair Tension
"Gallery"	June 27, 1990	15	45,000		Knock on My Door
"Shōnen no Hitomi ni..."	December 5, 1990	24	28,000		New Take: Best Collections '92
"Bijo to Yajū"	June 5, 1991	20	31,000		Trust Me
"Nee"	December 16, 1991	14	206,000		Ryūkō Kashu
"Steal Your Love"	March 27, 1992	15	129,000		Ryūkō Kashu
"Coffee Rumba"	May 8, 1992	35	171,000		Ryūkō Kashu
"Romantic ni Aishite"	July 1, 1992	28	43,000		Ryūkō Kashu
"Yumemiru Planet"	May 21, 1993	33	47,000		De-Luxe
"Tokyo Girl (Club Mix Version)"	June 23, 1993	66	10,000		Non-album single
"Romance"	August 21, 1993	47	33,000		History
"Passages of Time (Hot New Version)"	November 21, 1993	—			Non-album singles
"Mystery in Love"	December 1, 1993	—			Non-album singles
"Kyō kara Hajime yō" (duet with Kazuhito Murata)	February 9, 1994	50	10,000		Non-album singles
"Koi no Hallelujah"	November 23, 1994	76	4,000		History
"Shiawase e no Jikan"	June 21, 1995	86	4,000		Non-album singles
"Ashita wa Hareru!"	August 23, 1995	29	52,000		Non-album singles
"Look Up to the Sky"	March 21, 1997	—			Chains
"Make It On My Own"	August 21, 1997	—			Chains
"From My Garden"	November 21, 1997	—			Chains
"We'll Be Together"	June 23, 1999	83	3,000		Non-album singles
"Feeling" (duet with Masatoshi Ono)	November 20, 1999	—			Non-album singles
"Love"	October 24, 2001	—			Non-album singles
"Dancing Hero: The Archives"	December 20, 2017	15			Non-album singles
"Mushi no Tsubuyaki"	August 5, 2020	—			Bug in a Dress
"Let's Shake"	April 3, 2024	—			Non-album single
"—" denotes releases that did not chart.

== Other recordings ==
As a member of Milk

Year	Information	Oricon weekly peak position	Sales	RIAJ certification
1979	The Are kara Ichinen: Released: 1979; Label: CBS Sony; Formats: EP	—		
1980	Little Kiss: Released: August 1, 1980; Label: Warner Pioneer; Formats: Vinyl single	—		

As a featured artist

Release date	Work	Song	Notes
December 16, 1985	Bari Bari Densetsu	"I Love You wo Ienai Mama ni" "Skyway wo Mitsumete"	OVA theme song.
December 21, 1989	Kōendōri no Neko-tachi Original Soundtrack	"Kegareta kutsu no Initial" "Main Theme" "Omoide ni wa Hayasugiru"	
September 21, 1990	City Hunter Original Soundtrack	"Rock My Love"	City Hunter: Bay City Wars theme song.
September 21, 1990	City Hunter Original Soundtrack	"More More Shiawase"	City Hunter: Million Dollar Conspiracy theme song.
May 21, 1991	"Kanki no Uta" single	"Kanki no Uta"	Chorus on Zunō Keisatsu's eighth single.
October 19, 2005	Cover Lover Vol. 2 ~Bossa de Disco~	"Mary Jane"	
March 8, 2006	Cover Lover Vol. 3 ~Bossa de No. 1~	"Livin' on a Prayer"	
September 9, 2010	Otoko to Onna 3	"Ihōjin"	Junichi Inagaki's cover albums.
June 13, 2012	Aru Koi no Monogatari: My Standard Collection	"Koi wa Rhythm ni Nosete"	Junichi Inagaki's cover albums.

== Videography ==
=== Music video albums ===
List of media, with selected chart positions
Title	Album details	Peak positions		Sales (Oricon)
Title	Album details	JPN DVD	JPN Blu-ray	Sales (Oricon)
The Step: Yōko Oginome 1st	Released: March 5, 1985; Label: Victor; Formats: LD, VHS, DVD	—	—	N/A
Moving Now	Released: December 16, 1985; Label: Victor; Formats: LD, VHS, DVD	—	—	N/A
Dancing Colors	Released: January 1, 1987; Label: Victor; Formats: LD, VHS, DVD	—	—	N/A
Singin' Drive	Released: May 21, 1988; Label: Victor; Formats: LD, VHS, DVD	—	—	N/A
New Fashioned Love Songs	Released: August 5, 1992; Label: Victor; Formats: LD, VHS, DVD	—	—	N/A

=== Live video albums ===
List of media, with selected chart positions
Title	Album details	Peak positions		Sales (Oricon)
Title	Album details	JPN DVD	JPN Blu-ray	Sales (Oricon)
Verge of Love: Budokan Live	Released: March 21, 1989; Label: Victor; Formats: LD, VHS, DVD	—	—	N/A
Pop Liberation Force	Released: March 24, 1993; Label: Victor; Formats: LD, VHS, DVD	—	—	N/A
30th Anniversary Live Dear Pop Singer	Released: March 25, 2015; Label: Victor; Formats: Blu-ray+DVD	—	92	N/A
