= Super Groover the Box: The Perfect Singles =

Box set by Yōko Oginome
- Released: December 23, 2009
- Recorded: 1984–2005
- Genre: J-pop; kayōkyoku; dance-pop; pop rock; R&B
- Language: Japanese; English
- Label: Victor

Yōko Oginome chronology
| Songs & Voice (2009) | Super Groover the Box: The Perfect Singles (2009) | Original Album Collection: The Box (2010) |

Super Groover the Box: The Perfect Singles is a box set by Japanese singer Yōko Oginome. Released through Victor Entertainment on December 23, 2009, as part of Oginome's 25th solo career anniversary, the box set compiles all of her singles, B-sides, remixes, and music videos from 1984 to 2005.

The box set peaked at No. 178 on Oricon's albums chart.

== Track listing ==
Disc 1: The Perfect Singles 1984–1986
| No. | Title | Lyrics | Music | Arrangement | Length |
|---|---|---|---|---|---|
| 1. | "Mirai Kōkai (Sailing)" (Mirai Kōkai - sailing - (未来航海 - sailing -; lit. 'Future Voyage - Sailing -')) | Hiromi Kanda | Yukiyoshi Shimazu | Mitsuo Hagita | 3:17 |
| 2. | "Ryūsei Shōjo" ((流星少女; "Meteor Girl")) | Yoko Aki | Yūichirō Oda | Hagita | 4:07 |
| 3. | "Sayonara kara Hajimaru Monogatari" ((さよならから始まる物語; "A Story That Begins with a Goodbye")) | Chinfa Kan | Tetsuya Furumoto | Hagita | 3:18 |
| 4. | "Natsu no Hohoemi" ((夏の微笑; "Summer Smile")) | Yoshiko Miura | Yayoi Tanaka | Makoto Matsushita | 5:02 |
| 5. | "December Memory" (Disenbā Memorī (ディセンバー・メモリー)) | Miura | Daisuke Inoue | Motoki Funayama | 4:19 |
| 6. | "Ame to Jasmine" (Ame to Jasumin (雨とジャスミン; "Rain and Jasmine")) | Miura | D. Inoue | Funayama | 3:41 |
| 7. | "Mukokuseki Romance" (Mukokuseki Romansu (無国籍ロマンス; "A Romance Without Nationality")) | Fumiko Okada | Ryuichi Sakamoto | Jun Irie | 3:19 |
| 8. | "Tasogare Angel" (Tasogare Enjeru (たそがれエンジェル; lit. "Twilight Angel")) | Kanda | Shimazu | Hagita | 4:01 |
| 9. | "Koishite Caribbean" (Koishite Karibian (恋してカリビアン; "Love in the Caribbean")) | Gorō Matsui | Hideya Nakazaki | Nakazaki | 3:53 |
| 10. | "Ai no Time Capsule" (Ai no Taimu Kapuseru (愛のタイムカプセル; "Love Time Capsule")) | Yasushi Akimoto | Funayama | Funayama | 2:56 |
| 11. | "Kokoro no Mama ni (I'm Just a Lady)" ((心のままに 〜I'm just a lady〜; "As You Please ~I'm Just a Lady~")) | Mai Arai | Arai | Hagita | 4:21 |
| 12. | "Sweet Vacation" (Suīto Vakēshon (スイート・ヴァケーション)) | Akimoto | Nakazaki | Nakazaki | 3:19 |
| 13. | "Dancing Hero (Eat You Up)" (Danshingu Hīrō (Īto Yū Appu) (ダンシング・ヒーロー (Eat You Up))) | Hitoshi Shinohara | Angeline Kyte; Anthony Baker | Kōji Makaino | 3:49 |
| 14. | "Zenmaijikake no Suiyōbi" ((ぜんまいじかけの水曜日; "Mainspring Wednesday")) | Akimoto | Kazuhiko Matsuo | Hagita | 4:10 |
| 15. | "Flamingo in Paradise" (Furamingo in Paradaisu (フラミンゴ in パラダイス)) | Masao Urino | Nobody | Funayama | 3:55 |
| 16. | "Slope ni Tenki Ame" (Surōpu ni Tenki Ame (スロープに天気雨; "Rainy Weather on the Slope")) | Keiko Asō | Masayoshi Takanaka | Takanaka | 4:25 |
| 17. | "Dance Beat wa Yoake made" (Dansu Bīto wa Yoake made (Dance Beatは夜明けまで; "Dance Beat Until Dawn")) | Hiromi Mori | Nobody | Akira Nishihira | 3:42 |
| 18. | "Velvet no Itazura" (Berubetto no Itazura (ベルベットの悪戯; "Velvet Mischief")) | Masumi Kawamura | Hiroya Watanabe | Watanabe | 4:12 |

Disc 2: The Perfect Singles 1986–1989
| No. | Title | Lyrics | Music | Arrangement | Length |
|---|---|---|---|---|---|
| 1. | "Roppongi Junjōha" ((六本木純情派; "Roppongi Pure-Heart Clique")) | Urino | Akihiro Yoshimi | Hiroshi Shinkawa | 3:31 |
| 2. | "Romantic Odyssey" (Romantikku Odessei (ロマンティック・オデッセイ)) | Mori | Ginji Itō | Itō | 4:11 |
| 3. | "Wangan Taiyōzoku" ((湾岸太陽族; "Bayshore Route Sun Tribe")) | Urino | Minoru Yamazaki | Nishihira | 3:36 |
| 4. | "Konayuki no Resort" (Konayuki no Rizōto (粉雪のリゾート; "Powdered Snow Resort")) | | Tetsuya Furumoto | Nishihira | 4:23 |
| 5. | "Sayonara no Kajitsutachi" ((さよならの果実たち; "Goodbye Fruits")) | Urino | Kyōhei Tsutsumi | Satoshi Takebe | 3:46 |
| 6. | "Loftside Graffiti" (Rofutosaido Gurafiti (ロフトサイド・グラフィティ)) | Urino | Tsutsumi | Shinkawa | 4:10 |
| 7. | "Kitakaze no Carol" (Kitakaze no Kyaroru (北風のキャロル; "North Wind Carol")) | Urino | Tsutsumi | Shinkawa | 3:56 |
| 8. | "Getsuyōbi no Marīna" ((月曜日のマリーナ; "Monday Marina")) | Urino | Tsutsumi | Shinkawa | 4:20 |
| 9. | "Stranger Tonight" (Sutorenjā Tunaito (ストレンジャーtonight)) | Urino | Nobody | Ryō Yonemitsu | 4:06 |
| 10. | "Bus Stop" | Graham Gouldman | Gouldman | Nishihira | 3:43 |
| 11. | "Stardust Dream" (Sutādasuto Dorīmu (スターダスト・ドリーム)) | Reiji Asō | Yoshimasa Inoue | Shinkawa | 3:33 |
| 12. | "Jungle Dance" (Janguru Dansu (ジャングル・ダンス)) | Yukinojo Mori | Tetsuya Komuro | Yonemitsu | 3:47 |
| 13. | "Dear (Cobalt no Kanata e)" (Diā ~Kobaruto no Kanata e~ (DEAR ~コバルトの彼方へ~; "Dear (Beyond Cobalt)")) | Takafumi Sotoma | Ryō Asuka | Nobuyuki Shimizu | 4:08 |
| 14. | "Asa no Machi" ((朝の街; "Morning City")) | Asuka | Asuka | Shimizu | 3:57 |
| 15. | "Verge of Love (Japanese Version)" (Vu~āji obu Rabu (Nihongo Bājon) (ヴァージ・オブ・ラブ（日本語バージョン）)) | Shintarō Hirai | Narada Michael Walden; Joyce Imbesi; Carolyn Hedrich | Walden | 5:22 |
| 16. | "Swoopin' In" (Suūpin In (スゥーピン・イン))) | Urino | Walden; Jeffrey Cohen | | 5:22 |
| 17. | "Shōnan Heartbreak" (Shōnan Hātobureiku (湘南ハートブレイク)) | Urino | Yūji Ōtaguro | Tatsumi Yano | 3:55 |
| 18. | "Koishikute" ((恋しくて; lit. "I Miss You")) | Keiko Asō | Tetsuji Hayashi | Funayama | 4:01 |

Disc 3: The Perfect Singles 1989–1993
| No. | Title | Lyrics | Music | Arrangement | Length |
|---|---|---|---|---|---|
| 1. | "You're My Life" (Yua Mai Raifu (ユア・マイ・ライフ)) | Urino; James Christian | Christian | Yano | 3:58 |
| 2. | "Pink Sapphire" (Pinku Safaia (ピンク・サファイア)) | Yoshiko Miura | Keiju Ishikawa | Yano | 4:02 |
| 3. | "Gallery" (Gyararī (ギャラリー)) | Yōsui Inoue | Yōsui Inoue | Atsushi Onozawa | 4:42 |
| 4. | "On Bed" | Yōsui Inoue | Natsumi Hirai | Onozawa | 3:12 |
| 5. | "Shōnen no Hitomi ni..." ((少年の瞳に…; "In the Boy's Eyes...)) | Asō | Project.K | Ken Yoshida | 5:14 |
| 6. | "A Happy New Year" | Asō | Yoshida | Yoshida | 3:44 |
| 7. | "Bijo to Yajū" ((美女と野獣; "Beauty and the Beast")) | Kawamura | Toshinobu Kubota | Yōichirō "Wacky" Kakizaki; Kōji "Kitaroh" Nakamura | 4:12 |
| 8. | "I Know You" | Wakako Kaku | Kakizaki | Kakizaki | 4:25 |
| 9. | "Nee" (Nē (ねえ; "Hey")) | Reo Mikami | Tadashi Ishikawa | Yukio Sugai; Kōichi Kaminaga; Ryujin Inoue | 4:38 |
| 10. | "Sasayaka na Resistance" (Sasayaka na Rejisutansu (ささやかなレジスタンス; "A Modest Resistance")) | Miyuki Asano | R. Inoue | Sugai; Kaminaga; R. Inoue | 4:12 |
| 11. | "Steal Your Love" | Mikami | Satoshi Hirose | Sugai; Kaminaga; R. Inoue | 4:24 |
| 12. | "Moonlight Blue" | Asano | Joey Carbone | Sugai; Kaminaga; R. Inoue | 4:04 |
| 13. | "Coffee Rumba" (Kōhī Runba (コーヒー・ルンバ)) | Seiji Nakazawa | José Manzo Perroni | Sugai; Kaminaga; R. Inoue | 4:38 |
| 14. | "Starship" | Tadashi Ishikawa | Tarō Fukada | Sugai; Kaminaga; R. Inoue | 5:56 |
| 15. | "Romantic ni Aishite" (Romantikku ni Aishite (ロマンティックに愛して; "I Love You Romantically")) | Asano | Juichi Morishige | Sugai; Kaminaga; R. Inoue | 3:51 |
| 16. | "Inochi no Uta" ((生命の詩(うた); "Song of Life")) | Takashi Matsumoto | Katsuhisa Hattori | Takayuki Hattori | 6:09 |
| 17. | "Yumemiru Planet" (Yumemiru Puranetto (夢見るPLANET; "The Dreaming Planet")) | Yumi Yoshimoto | Nao Asada | Shirō Sagisu | 3:24 |
| 18. | "Ai wa Yume, Koi wa Maboroshi" ((愛はユメ恋はマボロシ; "Love Is a Dream, Love Is an Illusion")) | Asano | Akitoshi Onodera | Sugai; Kaminaga; R. Inoue | 3:55 |

Disc 4: The Perfect Singles 1993–1995
| No. | Title | Writer(s) | Arrangement | Length |
|---|---|---|---|---|
| 1. | "Tokyo Girl (Club Mix Version)" | | E.S.P. | 4:52 |
| 2. | "Umi no Sango" ((海の珊瑚; "Sea Coral")) | | Masayuki Iwata | 4:31 |
| 3. | "Romance" (Romanse (ロマンセ)) | | Edison | 3:57 |
| 4. | "Kuroi Hitomi" ((黒い瞳; "Dark Eyes")) | | Edison | 3:59 |
| 5. | "Passages of Time (Hot New Version)" ((パッセージ・オブ・タイム(HOT NEW VERSION))) | Walden; Walter Afanasieff; Jeffrey Cohen | Rod Antoon | 5:54 |
| 6. | "Something About You (Hot New Version)" ((サムシング・アバウト・ユー(HOT NEW VERSION))) | Walden; Afanasieff; Liz Jackson | Antoon | 5:26 |
| 7. | "Mystery in Love" | | Keiichi Takahashi | 4:18 |
| 8. | "Born to Be Wild" | | Keiichi Takahashi | 4:51 |
| 9. | "Kyō kara Hajime yō" ((今日から始めよう; "Let's Start Today")) | | Gotō | 5:51 |
| 10. | "Koi no Hallelujah" (Koi no Hareruya (恋のハレルヤ; "Love Hallelujah")) | | Fumio Okui | 3:38 |
| 11. | "Sha-La-La" | | Antoon | 3:48 |
| 12. | "Shiawase e no Jikan" ((幸福への時間; "Time for Happiness")) | | Akihiko Matsumoto | 4:35 |
| 13. | "If You Love Me Now (Aishisa ni Sarawarete)" ((IF YOU LOVE ME NOW ~愛しさにさらわれて~; "If You Love Me Now ~Being Kidnapped by Love")) | | Takayuki Hijikata | 5:13 |
| 14. | "Ashita wa Hareru!" ((明日は晴れる!; "It Will Be Fine Tomorrow!")) | | Oda | 4:05 |
| 15. | "Heartbreaker" | | Hiroshi Matsui | 4:02 |

Disc 5: The Perfect Singles 1997–2001
| No. | Title | Lyrics | Music | Arrangement | Length |
|---|---|---|---|---|---|
| 1. | "Look Up to the Sky" | Ua | Shinichi Osawa | Osawa | 5:15 |
| 2. | "Natural Woman" | Monday Michiru | Monday Michiru | Monday Michiru | 5:28 |
| 3. | "Make It On My Own" | Shūya Okino; Steve Anderson; Junior Giscombe; Alan Glass; Alison Limerick; Robbie Taylor | Anderson; Giscombe; Glass; Limerick; Taylor | Osawa | 5:06 |
| 4. | "Make It On My Own" (Original Mix) | Anderson; Giscombe; Glass; Limerick; Taylor | Anderson; Giscombe; Glass; Limerick; Taylor | Osawa | 6:32 |
| 5. | "Make It On My Own" (The Room Classics Mix) | Anderson; Giscombe; Glass; Limerick; Taylor | Anderson; Giscombe; Glass; Limerick; Taylor | Osawa | 7:24 |
| 6. | "From My Garden" | Junko Kudō | Monday Michiru | Monday Michiru | 4:56 |
| 7. | "Rainbow Chameleon" | Monday Michiru | Monday Michiru | Monday Michiru | 5:41 |
| 8. | "We'll Be Together" | Oginome | Steve Barakatt | Hiroaki Hayama | 5:01 |
| 9. | "Taiyō no Kisetsu" ((太陽の季節; "Seasons of the Sun")) | Oginome; T2ya | T2ya | Takehiro Kawabe | 4:27 |
| 10. | "Feeling" | Masatoshi Ono | Ono | Kawabe | 4:06 |
| 11. | "Forever" | Ono | Ono | Kawabe | 5:39 |
| 12. | "Love" | Kenji Sazanami; Milt Gabler | Bert Kaempfert | Kawabe | 3:14 |
| 13. | "Love" (Sweet Swing Track) | Sazanami; Gabler | Kaempfert | Seikō Nagaoka | 2:30 |
| 14. | "Candy" | Mack David; Joan Whitney | Alex Kramer | H-Wonder | 3:55 |

Disc 6: Versions and Remixes
| No. | Title | Lyrics | Music | Arrangement | Length |
|---|---|---|---|---|---|
| 1. | "Mirai Kōkai (Sailing)" (New Version) | Kanda | Shimazu | Yonemitsu | 3:18 |
| 2. | "Sayonara kara Hajimaru Monogatari" (New Version) | Kan | Furumoto | Yonemitsu | 3:20 |
| 3. | "Koishite Caribbean" (New Version) | Matsui | Nakazaki | Yonemitsu | 3:57 |
| 4. | "Kokoro no Mama ni (I'm Just a Lady)" (New Version) | Arai | Arai | Yonemitsu | 4:23 |
| 5. | "Dancing Hero (Eat You Up)" (Special English Version) | Marco Bruno | Kyte; Baker | Makaino | 3:47 |
| 6. | "Dancing Hero (Eat You Up)" ('70 Mirror Ball Mix) | Shinohara | Kyte; Baker | Makaino; Paradise Groove Productions | 5:08 |
| 7. | "Dancing Hero (Eat You Up)" (Club Mix) | Shinohara | Kyte; Baker | Kaminaga; Toshihiko Kataoka; Sugai | 5:52 |
| 8. | "Dancing Hero (Eat You Up)" (Euro Mix) | Shinohara | Kyte; Baker | Hirouyuki Yasumoto | 3:34 |
| 9. | "Dancing Hero (Eat You Up)" (Extended Euro Mix) | Shinohara | Kyte; Baker | Hirouyuki Yasumoto | 4:43 |
| 10. | "Dancing Hero (Eat You Up)" (Dancing Beat 2005 Mix) | Shinohara | Kyte; Baker | Sandro Oliva; Dave Rodgers | 4:50 |
| 11. | "Flamingo in Paradise" (What's Paradise Mix) | Urino | Nobody | Funayama; Paradise Groove Productions | 5:25 |
| 12. | "Dance Beat wa Yoake made" (In Sevilla) | Mori | Nobody | Nishihira | 4:01 |
| 13. | "Wangan Taiyōzoku" (Version II) | | Yamazaki | Nishihira; Sagisu | 3:43 |
| 14. | "Sayonara no Kajitsutachi" (Version II) | Urino | Tsutsumi | Takebe | 3:52 |
| 15. | "Kitakaze no Carol" (On Christmas Day) | Urino | Tsutsumi | Nishihira | 3:16 |

Disc 7: Versions and Remixes
| No. | Title | Lyrics | Music | Arrangement | Length |
|---|---|---|---|---|---|
| 1. | "You're My Life" (Version II) | Urino; Christian | Christian | Onozawa | 4:46 |
| 2. | "Symphonic Gallery" (Shinfonikku Gyararī (Symphonicギャラリー)) | Yōsui Inoue | Yōsui Inoue | Akira Senju | 6:00 |
| 3. | "Bijo to Yajū" (Savanna Mix) | Kawamura | Kubota | Kakizaki; Nakamura | 5:28 |
| 4. | "Bijo to Yajū" (Club Mix) | Kawamura | Kubota | Kakizaki; Nakamura | 6:08 |
| 5. | "Bijo to Yajū" (Jungle Version) | Kawamura | Kubota | Kakizaki; Nakamura | 4:11 |
| 6. | "Nee" (Club Mix) | Mikami | Ishikawa | Sugai; Kaminaga; R. Inoue | 8:55 |
| 7. | "Steal Your Love" (Club Mix) | Mikami | Hirose | Sugai; Kaminaga; R. Inoue | 6:41 |
| 8. | "Coffee Rumba" (Club Mix) | Nakazawa | Perroni | Sugai; Kaminaga; R. Inoue | 7:28 |
| 9. | "Make It On My Own" (Original Club Mix) | Anderson; Giscombe; Glass; Limerick; Taylor | Anderson; Giscombe; Glass; Limerick; Taylor | Osawa | 7:02 |
| 10. | "Make It On My Own" (Murphy's Club Mix) | Anderson; Giscombe; Glass; Limerick; Taylor | Anderson; Giscombe; Glass; Limerick; Taylor | Osawa | 6:08 |

DVD: The Videos
| No. | Title | Length |
|---|---|---|
| 1. | "Mirai Kōkai (Sailing)" (Another Version) |
| 2. | "Mirai Kōkai (Sailing)" |
| 3. | "Sayonara kara Hajimaru Monogatari" (Another Version) |
| 4. | "Sayonara kara Hajimaru Monogatari" |
| 5. | "December Memory" |
| 6. | "Mukokuseki Romance" |
| 7. | "Koishite Caribbean" |
| 8. | "Kokoro no Mama ni (I'm Just a Lady)" |
| 9. | "Dancing Hero (Eat You Up)" |
| 10. | "Flamingo in Paradise" (Another Version) |
| 11. | "Flamingo in Paradise" |
| 12. | "Dance Beat wa Yoake made" |
| 13. | "Roppongi Junjōha" |
| 14. | "Sayonara no Kajitsutachi" |
| 15. | "Stranger Tonight" |
| 16. | "Stardust Dream" |
| 17. | "Dear (Cobalt no Kanata e)" |
| 18. | "Gallery" |
| 19. | "Nee" |
| 20. | "Steal Your Love" |
| 21. | "Coffee Rumba" |
| 22. | "Romantic ni Aishite" |
| 23. | "Scandal" |
| 24. | "Look Up to the Sky" |
| 25. | "From My Garden" |
| 26. | "We'll Be Together" (Short Version) |
| 27. | "Feeling" |
| 28. | "Sayonara kara Hajimaru Monogatari" (Short Version) |
| 29. | "Nee" (Victoria Version) |
| 30. | "Dancing Hero (Eat You Up)" (Long Version) |

== Charts ==
| Chart (2009) | Peak position |
|---|---|
| Japanese Albums (Oricon) | 178 |
