= Golden Best (Yōko Oginome album) =

Compilation album by Yōko Oginome
- Released: September 16, 2009
- Recorded: 1985–1992
- Genre: J-pop; kayōkyoku; dance-pop; pop rock
- Length: 77:16
- Language: Japanese
- Label: Victor

Yōko Oginome chronology
Voice Nova (2009)	Golden Best (2009)	Songs & Voice (2009)

Golden Best (ゴールデン☆ベスト, Gōruden Besuto) is a compilation album by Japanese singer Yōko Oginome. Released through Victor Entertainment on September 16, 2009, as part of Oginome's 25th solo career anniversary, the album compiles her singles from 1985 to 1992.

The album peaked at No. 117 on Oricon's albums chart.

== Track listing ==
No.	Title	Lyrics	Music	Arrangement	Length
1.	"Dancing Hero (Eat You Up)" (Danshingu Hīrō (ダンシング・ヒーロー (Eat You Up)))	Hitoshi Shinohara	Angeline Kyte; Anthony Baker	Kōji Makaino	3:47
2.	"Roppongi Junjōha" ((六本木純情派; "Roppongi Pure-Heart Clique"))	Masao Urino	Akihiro Yoshimi	Hiroshi Shinkawa	3:26
3.	"Nee" (Nē (ねえ; "Hey"))	Reo Mikami	Tadashi Ishikawa	Yukio Sugai; Kōichi Kaminaga; Ryujin Inoue	4:33
4.	"Coffee Rumba" (Kōhī Runba (コーヒー・ルンバ))	Seiji Nakazawa	José Manzo Perroni	Sugai; Kaminaga; R. Inoue	4:32
5.	"Wangan Taiyōzoku" ((湾岸太陽族; "Bayshore Route Sun Tribe"))	Urino	Minoru Yamazaki	Akira Nishihira	3:36
6.	"Sayonara no Kajitsutachi" ((さよならの果実たち; "Goodbye Fruits"))	Urino	Kyōhei Tsutsumi	Satoshi Takebe	3:40
7.	"Dance Beat wa Yoake made" ((Dance Beatは夜明けまで; "Dance Beat Until Dawn"))	Hiromi Mori	Nobody	Nishihira	3:38
8.	"Flamingo in Paradise" (Furamingo in Paradaisu (フラミンゴ in パラダイス))	Urino	Nobody	Motoki Funayama	3:55
9.	"Stranger Tonight" (Sutorenjā Tunaito (ストレンジャーtonight))	Urino	Nobody	Ryō Yonemitsu	4:01
10.	"Stardust Dream" (Sutādasuto Dorīmu (スターダスト・ドリーム))	Reiji Asō	Yoshimasa Inoue	Shinkawa	3:30
11.	"Dear (Cobalt no Kanata e)" (Dear ~Kobaruto no Kanata e~ (DEAR ~コバルトの彼方へ~; "Dear (Beyond Cobalt)"))	Takafumi Sotoma	Ryō Asuka	Nobuyuki Shimizu	4:08
12.	"Steal Your Love"	Mikami	Satoshi Hirose	Sugai; Kaminaga; R. Inoue	4:22
13.	"Kitakaze no Carol" (Kitakaze no Kyaroru (北風のキャロル; "North Wind Carol"))	Urino	Tsutsumi	Shinkawa	3:51
14.	"Verge of Love (Japanese Version)" (Vu~āji obu Rabu (Nihongo Bājon) (ヴァージ・オブ・ラブ（日本語バージョン）))	Shintarō Hirai	Narada Michael Walden; Joyce Imbesi; Carolyn Hedrich	Walden	6:55
15.	"Shōnan Heartbreak" (Shōnan Hātobureiku (湘南ハートブレイク))	Urino	Yūji Ōtaguro	Tatsumi Yano	3:55
16.	"Mirai Kōkai (Sailing) (New Version)" (Mirai Kōkai - Seiringu - (未来航海 - sailing -; "Future Voyage - Sailing -"))	Hiromi Kanda	Yukiyoshi Shimazu	Yonemitsu	3:16
17.	"Kokoro no Mama ni (I'm Just a Lady) (New Version)" ((心のままに 〜I'm just a lady〜; "As You Please ~I'm Just a Lady~"))	Mai Arai	Arai	Yonemitsu	4:20
18.	"Koishite Caribbean (New Version)" (Koishite Karibian (恋してカリビアン; "Love in the Caribbean"))	Gorō Matsui	Hideya Nakazaki	Yonemitsu	3:54
19.	"You're My Life" (Yua Mai Raifu (ユア・マイ・ライフ))	Urino; James Christian	Christian	Yano	3:53
Total length:					77:16

== Charts ==
Chart (2009)	Peak position
Japanese Albums (Oricon)	117
