= '91 Oginome Collection =

Compilation album by Yōko Oginome
- Released: December 16, 1990
- Recorded: 1985–1990
- Genres: J-pop; kayōkyoku; dance-pop
- Length: 64:49
- Language: Japanese
- Label: Victor

Yōko Oginome chronology
Knock on My Door (1990)	'91 Oginome Collection (1990)	Trust Me (1991)

Singles from '91 Oginome Collection
- 1. "Shōnan Heartbreak" Released: June 7, 1989

'91 Oginome Collection is a compilation album by Japanese singer Yōko Oginome. Released through Victor Entertainment on December 16, 1990, the album compiles Oginome's singles from 1985 to 1990, plus the new songs "Rock My Love", "This Girl", and "More More Shiawase".

The album peaked at No. 29 on Oricon's albums chart and sold over 56,000 copies.

== Track listing ==
No.	Title	Lyrics	Music	Arrangement	Length
1.	"Dancing Hero (Eat You Up)" (Danshingu Hīrō (Īto Yū Appu) (ダンシング・ヒーロー (Eat You Up)))	Hitoshi Shinohara	Angeline Kyte; Anthony Baker	Kōji Makaino	3:50
2.	"Flamingo in Paradise" (Furamingo in Paradaisu (フラミンゴ in パラダイス))	Masao Urino	Nobody	Motoki Funayama	3:55
3.	"Dance Beat wa Yoake made" (Dansu Bīto wa Yoake made (Dance Beatは夜明けまで; "Dance Beat Until Dawn"))	Hiromi Mori	Nobody	Akira Nishihira	3:43
4.	"Roppongi Junjōha" ((六本木純情派; "Roppongi Pure-Heart Clique"))	Urino	Akihiro Yoshimi	Hiroshi Shinkawa	3:31
5.	"Wangan Taiyōzoku" ((湾岸太陽族; "Bayshore Route Sun Tribe"))	Urino	Minoru Yamazaki	Nishihira	3:41
6.	"Sayonara no Kajitsutachi" ((さよならの果実たち; "Goodbye Fruits"))	Urino	Kyōhei Tsutsumi	Satoshi Takebe	3:46
7.	"Kitakaze no Carol" (Kitakaze no Kyaroru (北風のキャロル; "North Wind Carol"))	Urino	Tsutsumi	Shinkawa	3:57
8.	"Stranger Tonight" (Sutorenjā Tunaito (ストレンジャーtonight))	Urino	Nobody	Ryō Yonemitsu	4:06
9.	"Stardust Dream" (Sutādasuto Dorīmu (スターダスト・ドリーム))	Reiji Asō	Yoshimasa Inoue	Shinkawa	3:33
10.	"Dear (Cobalt no Kanata e)" (Diā ~Kobaruto no Kanata e~ (DEAR ~コバルトの彼方へ~; "Dear (Beyond Cobalt)"))	Takafumi Sotoma	Ryō Asuka	Nobuyuki Shimizu	4:08
11.	"Shōnan Heartbreak" (Shōnan Hātobureiku (湘南ハートブレイク))	Urino	Yūji Ōtaguro	Tatsumi Yano	3:55
12.	"You're My Life" (Yua Mai Raifu (ユア・マイ・ライフ))	Urino; James Christian	Christian	Yano	3:58
13.	"Gallery" (Gyararī (ギャラリー))	Yōsui Inoue	Yōsui Inoue	Atsushi Onozawa	4:43
14.	"Rock My Love"	Yumi Yoshimoto	Makaino	Makaino	4:33
15.	"This Girl"	Keiko Asō	Yoshimasa Inoue	Ryō Yonemitsu	4:24
16.	"More More Shiawase" (Moa Moa Shiawase (MORE MORE しあわせ; "More More Happiness"))	Masumi Kawamura	Mark Davis	Inoue Brothers	4:59
Total length:					64:49

== Charts ==
Chart (1991)	Peak position
Japanese Albums (Oricon)	29

== See also ==
- 1990 in Japanese music
