= New Take: Best Collections '92 =

Remix album by Yōko Oginome
- Released: December 16, 1991
- Recorded: 1990–1991
- Genre: J-pop; dance-pop
- Length: 48:51
- Language: Japanese
- Label: Victor

Yōko Oginome chronology
Trust Me (1991)	New Take: Best Collections '92 (1991)	Ryūkō Kashu (1992)

Singles from New Take: Best Collections '92
- 1. "Shōnen no Hitomi ni..." Released: December 5, 1990

New Take: Best Collections '92 is a remix album by Japanese singer Yōko Oginome. Released through Victor Entertainment on December 16, 1991, the album features re-recordings and remixes of Oginome's past singles, as well as select B-sides.

The album peaked at No. 48 on Oricon's albums chart. It also sold over 21,000 copies.

== Track listing ==
No.	Title	Lyrics	Music	Arrangement	Length
1.	"Kitakaze no Carol (On Christmas Day)" (Kitakaze Kyaroru (北風のキャロル -on Christmas day-; "North Wind Carol -On Christmas Day-"))	Masao Urino	Kyōhei Tsutsumi	Akira Nishihira	3:33
2.	"Symphonic Gallery" (Shinfonikku Gyararī (Symphonicギャラリー))	Yōsui Inoue	Inoue	Akira Senju	5:59
3.	"Dance Beat wa Yoake made (In Sevilla)" (Dansu Bīto wa Yoake made (Dance Beatは夜明けまで -in セビーリア-; "Dance Beat Until Dawn -In Sevilla-"))	Hiromi Mori	Nobody	Nishihira	3:59
4.	"You're My Life (Version II)" (Yua Mai Raifu (ユア・マイ・ライフ (YOU’RE MY LIFE) -version II-))	Urino; James Christian	Christian	Atsushi Onozawa	4:43
5.	"Because (Version II)"	Yume Suzuki	Suzuki	Ryōichi Kuniyoshi	5:36
6.	"Morning Rain"	Masumi Kawamura	Toshinobu Kubota	Yōichirō "Wacky" Kakizaki	3:51
7.	"Bijo to Yajū (Savanna Mix)" ((美女と野獣 -savanna mix-; "Beauty and the Beast -Savanna Mix-"))	Kawamura	Kubota	Kakizaki; Kōji "Kitaroh" Nakamura	5:26
8.	"Flamingo in Paradise (What's 'Paradise' Mix)" (Furamingo in Paradaisu (フラミンゴ in パラダイス -what's "PARADISE" mix-))	Urino	Nobody	Funayama; Paradise Groove Productions	5:23
9.	"Dancing Hero (Eat You Up) ('70s Mirror Ball Mix)" (Danshingu Hīrō (Īto Yū Appu) (ダンシング・ヒーロー (Eat You Up) -'70s Mirror Ball Mix-))	Hitoshi Shinohara	Angeline Kyte; Anthony Baker	Kōji Makaino; Paradise Groove Productions	5:07
10.	"Shōnen no Hitomi ni..." ((少年の瞳に…; "In the Boy's Eyes...))	Keiko Asō	Project.K	Ken Yoshida	5:14
Total length:					48:51

== Charts ==
Chart (1991)	Peak position
Japanese Albums (Oricon)	48
