= Chains (album) =

Studio album by Yōko Oginome
- Released: December 17, 1997
- Recorded: 1997
- Genres: J-pop; dance-pop; R&B; pop rock
- Length: 59:30
- Languages: Japanese; English
- Label: Victor
- Producers: Shinichi Osawa; Monday Michiru; Hajime Yoshizawa; Tosh Masuda

Yōko Oginome chronology
History (1995)	Chains (1997)	Yōko Oginome Best Selection (2005)

Singles from Chains
- 1. "Look Up to the Sky" Released: March 21, 1997; 2. "Make It on My Own" Released: August 21, 1997; 3. "From My Garden" Released: November 21, 1997

Alternate cover

Chains (チェインズ, Cheinzu) is the 16th studio album by Japanese singer/songwriter Yōko Oginome. Released through Victor Entertainment on December 17, 1997, the album was produced by Shinichi Osawa of Mondo Grosso, Monday Michiru, Hajime Yoshizawa of Cosmic Village, and Tosh Masuda. It features the singles "Look Up to the Sky", "From My Garden" and a Japanese-language cover of Alison Limerick's "Make It on My Own". It was Oginome's last studio release before her marriage to tennis player Ryuso Tsujino in 2001. The album was reissued on May 26, 2010, with three bonus tracks as part of Oginome's 25th anniversary celebration.

== Track listing ==
No.	Title	Lyrics	Music	Arrangement	Length
1.	"The Cheeping of Birds" (Instrumental)		Hajime Yoshizawa; Genta; YOKO	Yoshizawa; Genta; YOKO	0:22
2.	"Sunshine"	YOKO	Yoshizawa	Yoshizawa	5:26
3.	"Look Up to the Sky"	Ua	Shinichi Osawa	Osawa	5:15
4.	"Never Cry Like a River"	YOKO	Benji	Osawa	5:54
5.	"Lost Highway"	YOKO	Benji	Tosh Masuda	3:32
6.	"Sawatte Sotto Kuchidzuke" ((触って そっと 口づけして; "Touch and Kiss Me Gently"))	Toppo	Masuda	Ōsawa; Masuda	4:21
7.	"Rainbow Chameleon" (English)	Monday Michiru	Monday Michiru	Monday Michiru	5:38
8.	"Make It on My Own" (Extended Mix)	Shūya Okino; Steve Anderson; Junior Giscombe; Alan Glass; Alison Limerick; Robbie Taylor	Anderson; Giscombe; Glass; Limerick; Taylor	Osawa	6:59
9.	"Natural Woman" (English)	Monday Michiru	Monday Michiru	Monday Michiru	5:27
10.	"From My Garden"	Junko Kudō	Monday Michiru	Monday Michiru	4:56
11.	"Fly Me to the Air"	Toppo	Masuda	Osawa; Masuda	5:15
12.	"Make It on My Own" (Murphy's Club Mix)	Okino; Anderson; Giscombe; Glass; Limerick	Anderson; Giscombe; Glass; Limerick	Osawa	6:18
Total length:					59:30

2010 bonus tracks
No.	Title	Lyrics	Music	Arrangement	Length
13.	"Make It on My Own"	Okino; Anderson; Giscombe; Glass; Limerick; Taylor	Anderson; Giscombe; Glass; Limerick; Taylor	Osawa	5:06
14.	"Make It on My Own" (Original Mix [English])	Anderson; Giscombe; Glass; Limerick; Taylor	Anderson; Giscombe; Glass; Limerick; Taylor	Osawa	6:31
15.	"Hana" ((花; "Flower"))	Gorō Matsui	Rebecca.RM	Hiroaki Hayama	5:09
Total length:					16:48
