= Where Love Lives =

- 1991 European reissue

Single by Alison Limerick

from the album And Still I Rise
- Released: November 1990; 1991 (re-release); 1996 (Dancing Divas remix)
- Recorded: 1990
- Genre: House; disco; hi-NRG; garage
- Length: 3:26
- Label: Arista
- Songwriter: Lati Kronlund
- Producers: Lati Kronlund; Dancing Divas

Alison Limerick singles chronology
"Where Love Lives" (1990)	"Make It on My Own" (1992)

Music video
- "Where Love Lives" on YouTube

1996 Cover
- 1996 European reissue

"Where Love Lives (Come On In)" is a song by British singer-songwriter and former dancer Alison Limerick, released first time in November 1990 by Arista Records as her solo-debut. It was written and produced by Swedish producer Lati Kronlund, and received favorable reviews from music critics, becoming a massive club hit in the early 1990s in both the United Kingdom and United States. In 1991, the single peaked at number 27 on the UK Singles Chart and number three on the US Billboard Hot Dance Club Play chart. It was also voted Dance Track of 1991 by Billboard magazine. In 1992, it was included on Limerick's debut album, And Still I Rise. In 1996, it was released in a new remix by Dancing Divaz, peaking at number nine in the UK and number four on the US dance chart. The song is famous for the funked-up piano intro and remains the singer's most successful release. It is now widely regarded as one of the biggest club anthems of all time, and has been remixed and re-released several times. In 2022 and 2025, Rolling Stone and Billboard included "Where Love Lives" in their lists of the greatest dance songs of all time.

== Background ==
"There was one point a few years ago where I was upset about it; upset that it would define me regardless of whatever else I did. But ‘Where Love Lives’ turned me into a focused artist after years spent as a jobbing singer, dancer and actress. And when I see people reacting to it that’s always genuinely amazing. More so now, when those people are not just of the older club generations but the new ones too…the twenty-somethings. When you’re live they are always new ways to sing a classic song like that and keep it fresh."

— Alison Limerick talking to Glitterbox about the song.

Alison Limerick began her career as a dancer, before shifting her focus onto singing. She performed in the musical Labelled with Love and as a backing vocalist in the mid-80s after attending the London Contemporary School of Dance. Her first major gig was backing vocals on Style Council's Shout to the Top! in 1984. She appeared in musicals including Andrew Lloyd Webber’s Starlight Express and Simon Callow’s The Pajama Game. And in 1989 she made a brief appearance as an African sorceress in Bob Rafelson's film Mountains of the Moon.

Swedish producer and songwriter Lati Kronlund (Lars E.C. Kronlund) picked Limerick to record "Where Love Lives", after seeing her singing at a show at the ICA in London. She performed Billie Holiday’s 1941 song, "God Bless The Child" and Kronlund was in the audience. He told her that "Where Love Lives" was her song to sing because it required someone with a big two-octave range. The track is written/produced by Lati Kronlund and mixed by David Morales and Frankie Knuckles. About recording the song, she said in a 1992 interview with Billboard magazine: "I just went in and sang the song with absolutely no expectations of where it might lead. In fact, I had almost forgotten about the track when I got a call saying [Arista] wanted to sign me up."

== Release ==
"It's like a journey, a story, a song you can relate to. It's wonderful — it still gives me goosebumps. I don't get tired of playing this record — it's such a good arrangement. It's one of the favourite mixes I've done over the years."

— David Morales talking to Music Week about the song.

The 1990 release of the single was named just "Where Love Lives", but when re-released in 1991 it got named "Where Love Lives (Come On In)". It is the first single from Limerick's debut album, And Still I Rise, which was released in March 1992. That year she also won the Best Female Artist Award at 1992's DMC Awards. In 1996 Arista released the Alison Limerick Club Classics, a remix album. From this release, "Where Love Lives" again topped the dance charts with "Make It on My Own" following. For the first time "Where Love Lives" was released in America and it reached number four in the Billboard Hot Dance 100 chart. In 2003, the song appeared on the charts yet again thanks to new remixes, reaching number 16 on the Billboard dance charts and number 44 on the UK Singles Chart.

In 2016, Limerick joined music collective Brooklyn Funk Essentials as lead singer and together they released a new version of "Where Love Lives" via Dorado Records in 2018. Lati Kronlund, who co-started the collective commented on the re-recording of "Where Love Lives", "It's a funky version, played all live in the studio by the band, it is almost a live tribute to the Frankie Knuckles and Dave Morales remix of the song from the early nineties, but also to the Philly disco and Chicago house sound that was the song’s original inspiration."

== Chart performance ==
"The dance market at the moment is just a cattle market. And if you don't fit in then it's just not worth the effort, but I'm just going to hammer at the door till I'm let in."

— Alison Limerick talking to Record Mirror about the song.

Upon its first release in November 1990, "Where Loves Lives" failed to make an impact on the UK Singles Chart when it peaked at number 87 in its first week, on 11 November. The following week, the single dropped out before re-entering at number 99 in its last week that year, on 25 November. However, after becoming a successful club hit, a re-release some months later in 1991 ensured the song entering the UK Top 30, when it peaked at number 27. This year, it first entered at number 44 on 24 March, before climbing to 39 and 29, and then peaking at 27 on 14 April. After this, in the following weeks, the single dropped to number 31, 39, 52 and 75, on 12 May 1991. On the UK Dance Singles chart in Music Week, it reached number two on 6 April.

Another release of the track, remixed by Dancing Divas (an alias of UK music producer Ian Bland) charted in 1996. This version was even more successful, peaking at its first week on the UK Singles Chart at number nine, on 30 June, becoming Limerick's highest-charting hit to date. It also topped the UK Dance Singles Chart and Music Week's RM Club Chart. The following weeks on the singles chart, it dropped to number 15, 27, 39, 49 and 65 on 4 August 1996. In 2003, a new remix of "Where Love Lives" by UK dance producer duo Northstarz peaked and debuted at number 44 on 15 March. The following week it dropped to number 70, before leaving the UK Singles Chart.

The song was also a huge dance/club hit in the United States, peaking at number three on the Billboard Hot Dance Club Play chart in 1991. In 1996, the Dancing Divaz remix peaked at number four and in 2003, the Northstarz remix peaked on number 16.

== Critical reception ==
Swedish Aftonbladet called the song "eminent". J.D. Considine from The Baltimore Sun felt it is "darkly compelling". David Taylor-Wilson from Bay Area Reporter commented, "What a great song. The vocals are fierce and that piano accompaniment digs right into you." Larry Flick from Billboard magazine said it is "brilliant", noting its "disco buoyance". Marisa Fox from Entertainment Weekly described it as an "energetic, fast-paced" track with "light, catchy" chorus. She added, "gone are the days when house music meant stone-cold rhythms and hardly any melody." Andy Beevers from Music Week complimented it as a "stunning" debut. NME named it Single of the Week, writing, "An energetic dancefloor smash that would sound merely like Adeva in a strop were it not for the accompanying music's unusual and compelling rhythmic contortions." An editor, Jane Bussman, praised it as a "stunning dance tune", adding further, "'Where Love Lives' is a corker: a compulsive, uptempo tune that manages to be as danceable as an Italian record like 'Numero Uno', without losing the edge of deep house. With its instantly recognisable piano intro, the record is currently a big buzz on the dancefloors, but it's also a cracking good tune."

Peter Stanton from Record Mirror wrote, "Ms Limerick might be an unheard-of entity to many, but she has become a humungous floorfiller on the club circuit over the last few months with her achingly danceable track 'Where Love Lives'. This ripe beauty of a number failed to ignite the charts on its first release last November, but the idle public are being given a second chance-to-purchase option." He also named it an "pleasant ditty". Another Record Mirror editor, James Hamilton, called it a "genuinely massive floorfiller" and a "pelvis-twitching sinewy girl's piano jangled then sparsely pulsing attractive canterer". The magazine's Davydd Chong wrote, "Nice piano riff, good melody and rather Madonna-esque".

Upon the release of the 1996 remix, Flick of Billboard said, "Needless to say, the Dancing Divaz mix crackles with hi-NRG vigor and will effectively flirt with radio programmers who missed the boat the first time." A reviewer from Music Week complimented it as "awesome". James Hyman for the RM Dance Update gave it a full score of five out of five, writing, "Dancing Divaz remain pretty faithful to the original, adding more piano chords at the intro and re-structuring verses and chorus. [..] Classic Morales & Perfecto mixes complete a perfect packaging of this perennial."

== Music video ==
A music video was made for "Where Love Lives", directed by James Hyman. The 1996 video version used the same video as the original, but was edited in a different way to accompany the remix.

The music video features Limerick performing with dancers moving both in front of and behind a bright backdrop, making shadow-dancing silhouettes. Sometimes they are also seen dancing in front of mirrors. Sometimes she's dressed in a purple suit with a purple caps. Other times she wears a glittery metal dress. It was later made available on Limerick's official YouTube channel in October 2009. The 1996 Dancing Divaz version was made available in November 2012.

== Impact and legacy ==
"Probably of all the songs I've worked on, this is the most lyrical -- musically it says everything. It was one of the first mixes David [Morales] and I did together, it's classic Frankie and David — hard edged and fused with lush, beautiful orchestral arrangements."

— Frankie Knuckles talking to Music Week about the song.

DJ Magazine ranked it number nine in their list of "Top 100 Club Tunes" in 1998. British DJ Danny Rampling picked "Where Love Lives" as one of his "classic cuts" in 1994, saying, "The greatest Knuckles and Morales mixes. Lush ballroom strings, piano and tough dubs. A record with so much soul it fills you with deep joy. It will still sound good in 20 years' time. British DJ Fat Tony named it one of his "classic cuts" in 1995, saying, "I was one of the first people to have it – someone stole a test pressing for me. It's a genius track and it brings back memories of drug abuse. An uplifting song, it paved the way for similar songs. It's happy – one of thos tunes I always slip on." British DJ, music producer and radio presenter Pete Tong named it one of his favourites in 1995, stating, "Morales and Knuckles together at their best. The almost perfect garage anthem. Uplifting, stacks of emotion. I always get goosepimples when I hear it. Perfect." Electronic dance and clubbing magazine Mixmag ranked the song number one in its "100 Greatest Dance Singles of All Time" list in 1996, writing, "'Where Love Lives (Come On in)' is the greatest dance record of all time because it's got everything. It swings, it makes girls pout, boys preen and hearts sing. There's a touch of sadness about it but it's incredibly uplifting, reaching a bittersweet joy that only the most spiritual of house achieves. Ms Limerick - whose subsequent career never lived up to this - sings with a throaty, controlled abandon, hitting the high notes while arms hit the ceiling. Even the lyrics are cool: strong woman sends out her love but gives her lover a bit of a slagging while she's about it."

In 1996, English DJ and record producer Nicky Holloway named it one of his top 10 vinyl thrills, saying, "I'm not too proud to admit it, but it should only be played twice a year, on New Year's Eve and birthdays, and not once a week." BBC Radio’s 2008 listeners & DJs poll "The Greatest Ever Dance Record", "Where Love Lives" came in at number five, after Michael Jackson's "Billie Jean", James Brown's "Sex Machine", Donna Summer's "I Feel Love" and Derrick May's "Strings of Life". In 2011, DJ Mag included "Where Love Lives" in their list of the "Top 100 Most Important House Tracks". In 2011, MTV Dance ranked it number 58 in their list of "The 100 Biggest 90's Dance Anthems of All Time" in November. After the passing of Frankie Knuckles in 2014, Barry Walters of NPR Music wrote, "If I had to sum up Knuckles' tender, supple sound with one song, it would the 1991 mix he and his pupil Morales did for Alison Limerick's 'Where Love Lives'. It starts with the kind of piano that makes real club people dance, and continues for several bars without a single drum beat. Then the rhythm machines enter, ensuring that every DJ capable of matching beats could smoothly mix in from the next record if they didn't dare to start with the bare piano. As the track progresses, the sound ebbs and flows as if it had been orchestrated with real instruments, as if disco hadn't died at all. I'll take you down, deep down where love lives, Limerick growls in a way that doesn't leave any place for doubt. That's where Knuckles' spirit resides, in that place where love lives, a place designed to live on as long as hips feel that impulse to sway."

"Overall, this gives you a whole mood. The vocals are spot on, the lyrics are really nice. Everything's cool!"

— Marshall Jefferson talking to Music Week about the song.

Time Out`s 2015 list of "The 20 Best House Tracks Ever" included "Where Love Lives" as number 14, adding, "One of the finest example of how dance music could do more than just borrow hooks and melodies from pop, 'Where Love Lives' went one step further. UK singer Alison Limerick's rich vocal lines are layered over upfront house beats, creating the perfect crossover record, aimed right at the mainstream, but still retaining the dance music credentials of all involved." Glitterbox named its 2021 nightlife documentary Where Love Lives after the song. It was launched as a three-part live watch-along event exclusively on YouTube. In 2022, Rolling Stone ranked it number 74 in their "200 Greatest Dance Songs of All Time" list, and in 2025, Billboard ranked it number 79 in their "The 100 Best Dance Songs of All Time", writing, "Built on one of the sturdiest and most buoyant piano riffs in house history – no small feat, that – Alison Limerick's biggest anthem finds the kind of strength in togetherness that almost feels like she's singing from the perspective of the dancefloor itself. Come on in, come on in, come on in the British vocalist insists – and when she's got luminaries no less hallowed than David Morales and Frankie Knuckles (who both worked on the song) helping her make her case, there's pretty much no way you're not gonna follow her down."

In 2025 the song was featured prominently in the Christmas advert of UK department store chain John Lewis & Partners, alongside a newly recorded cover version by Labrinth.

=== Accolades ===
"What a tune — a classic. This record gives you everything you need, excellent uplifling vocals and a wicked piano break. It was definitely way before its time and it was remixed and rereleased for 1996 without taking anything away from the original."

— DJ Dean Lambert talking to Music Week about the song.

"One of the best songs from the '90s that comes to my mind was Alison Limerick's "Where Love Lives. It is an excellent example of a house track from the period that was sophisticated, lush and incredibly well-produced. It has a divine piano, lovely vocals and is structurally put together so well. To this day, people go crazy for that song, and it has stood the test of time."

— DJ Susan Morabito talking about the song in 2017.

Year	Publisher	Country	Accolade	Rank
1991	Billboard	United States	"Dance Track of 1991"	1
1991	The Face	United Kingdom	"The Face Recordings of the Year: Singles"	7
1996	Mixmag	United Kingdom	"The 100 Best Dance Singles of All Time"	1
1998	DJ Magazine	United Kingdom	"Top 100 Club Tunes"	9
1999	HX	United States	"The New York DJs Best Dance Song of the 90s"	1
2006	BBC Radio	United Kingdom	"The Greatest Ever Dance Record"-poll by BBC Radio's 2008 listeners & DJs	5
2011	DJ Mag	United Kingdom	"Top 100 Most Important House Tracks"	*
2011	MTV Dance	United Kingdom	"The 100 Biggest 90's Dance Anthems of All Time"	58
2015	Time Out	United Kingdom	"The 20 Best House Tracks Ever"	14
2015	Robert Dimery	United States	"1,001 Songs You Must Hear Before You Die, and 10,001 You Must Download (2015 Update)"	1002
2016	DJ Mag	United Kingdom	"Top 50 Tracks of 1996"	44
2019	Mixmag	United Kingdom	"15 of the Best Classic House Tracks About Love"	*
2019	Mixmag	United Kingdom	"The 20 Best Diva House Tracks"	*
2020	Tomorrowland	Belgium	"Ibiza Top 500"	48
2022	Classic Pop	United Kingdom	"90s Dance – The Essential Playlist"	14
2022	Rolling Stone	United States	"200 Greatest Dance Songs of All Time"	74
2022	Time Out	United Kingdom	"20 Best House Tracks Ever"	8
2025	Billboard	United States	"The 100 Best Dance Songs of All Time"	79
2025	Billboard	United States	"The 50 Best House Songs of All Time"	25

(*) indicates the list is unordered.

== Track listing ==
- UK Vinyl single, 7-inch (1990)

A. "Where Love Lives" (7")
B. "Where Love Lives" (Zone)

- UK Vinyl single, 12-inch (1990)

A. "Where Love Lives" (The Definitive Mix)
B1. "Where Love Lives" (Classic Mix)
B2. "Where Love Lives" (Cut to the Bone)

- UK Vinyl single, 12-inch (1990)

A. "Where Love Lives" (Sauna Mix)
B1. "Where Love Lives" (Classic Mix)
B2. "Where Love Lives" (Cut to the Bone)

- UK Vinyl single (Remix), 12-inch (1990)

A. "Where Love Lives" (Red Zone)
B1. "Where Love Lives" (Swedes in the Area)
B2. "Where Love Lives" (Spring)

- UK CD single (1990)
1. "Where Love Lives" (7") – 3:44
2. "Where Love Lives" (Classic Mix) – 7:01
3. "Where Love Lives" (Red Zone Edit) – 4:04
4. "Where Love Lives" (Cut to the Bone) – 5:07
- UK Vinyl single, 12-inch (1991)

A. "Where Love Lives (Come On In)" (Classic Mix) – 6:50
A2. "Where Love Lives (Come On In)" (Red Zone Mix) – 5:35
B. "Where Love Lives (Come On In)" (Cut to the Bone) – 5:07

- UK Vinyl single (The Remixes), 12-inch (1991)

A. "Where Love Lives (Come On In)" (Sound Factory Mix) – 8:25
B1. "Where Love Lives (Come On In)" (Jammin' On Mix) – 5:51
B2. "Where Love Lives (Come On In)" (Mo' Knuckles Mix) – 5:59

- UK & Europe CD single (1991)
1. "Where Love Lives (Come On In)" (Radio Edit) – 3:49
2. "Where Love Lives (Come On In)" (Classic Mix) – 6:55
3. "Where Love Lives (Come On In)" (Red Zone Mix) – 5:33
- Europe Vinyl single, 12-inch (1996)

A1. "Where Love Lives" (Dancing Divas Club Mix)
A2. "Where Love Lives" (Classic Mix)
B1. "Where Love Lives" (Romanthony's Hardtronic Vox Music)
B2. "Where Love Lives" (Perfecto Mix)

- UK & Europe CD single (1996)
1. "Where Love Lives" (Dancing Divaz '96 Radio Edit) – 3:47
2. "Where Love Lives" (Original 7" Radio Edit) – 3:48
3. "Where Love Lives" (Romanthony's Hardtronic Vox Mix) – 9:25
4. "Where Love Lives" (Classic Mix) – 6:54
5. "Where Love Lives" (Dancing Divaz Club Mix) – 7:23
6. "Where Love Lives" (Perfecto Mix) – 6:30
- UK CD single (2003)
1. "Where Love Lives" (Northstarz Radio Mix) – 3:33
2. "Where Love Lives" (K-Boy Radio Mix) – 3:19
3. "Where Love Lives" (West London Deep Mix) – 6:53
4. "Where Love Lives" (Original Classic Club Mix) – 6:12

== Charts ==
=== Weekly charts ===
Chart (1990)	Peak position
UK Singles (OCC)	87
UK Club Chart (Record Mirror)	2

Chart (1991)	Peak position
Europe (Eurochart Hot 100)	49
Luxembourg (Radio Luxembourg)	19
UK Singles (OCC)	27
UK Airplay (Music Week)	18
UK Dance (Music Week)	2
UK Club Chart (Record Mirror)	3
US Hot Dance Club Play (Billboard)	3

Chart (1996)	Peak position
Europe (Eurochart Hot 100)	20
Israel (Israeli Singles Chart)	21
Scotland (OCC)	21
UK Singles (OCC)	9
UK Dance (OCC)	1
UK Airplay (Music Week)	11
UK Club Chart (Music Week)	1
UK Pop Tip Club Chart (Music Week)	5
US Hot Dance Club Play (Billboard)	4

Chart (2003)	Peak position
Scotland (OCC)	49
UK Physical Singles (OCC)	44
UK Dance (OCC)	5
US Hot Dance Club Play (Billboard)	16

Chart (2020)	Peak position
UK Physical Singles (OCC)	42
UK Vinyl Singles (OCC)	38

Chart (2025)	Peak position
UK Singles (OCC)	5
UK Physical Singles (OCC)	42
UK Singles Downloads (OCC)	4
UK Dance (OCC)	12
UK Vinyl Singles (OCC)	38

Chart (2026)	Peak position
UK Singles (OCC)	21
UK Physical Singles (OCC)	65
UK Singles Downloads (OCC)	17
UK Dance (OCC)	25

=== Year-end charts ===
Chart (1990)	Positions
UK Club Chart (Record Mirror)	27

Chart (1991)	Positions
UK Club Chart (Record Mirror)	35

Chart (1996)	Positions
UK Club Chart (Music Week)	20
UK Pop Tip Club Chart (Music Week)	39

== Certifications ==
Region	Certification	Certified units/sales
United Kingdom (BPI) Sales since 2004	Gold	400,000^{‡}
^{‡} Sales+streaming figures based on certification alone.

== Personnel ==
- Producer – Lati Kronlund
- Mix – Frankie Knuckles, David Morales
- Engineer – John Poppo
- Keyboards – Eric Kupper, Peter Schwartz
