= And Still I Rise (album) =

Studio album by Alison Limerick
- Released: 26 March 1992
- Recorded: 1990–1991
- Studios: The Church (London); DMC; F2 Studios; Konk Studios; Sarm West Studios; Swanyard Studios; The Workhouse Studios
- Genres: House; electronic; dance-pop
- Length: 54:51
- Label: Arista
- Producers: Lati Kronlund; Steve Anderson; Arthur Baker; David Barratt; John Waddell

Alison Limerick chronology
And Still I Rise (1992)	With a Twist (1994)

Professional ratings
Review scores
Source	Rating
Encyclopedia of Popular Music	3/5 stars

And Still I Rise is the debut album by British singer-songwriter Alison Limerick, released by Arista Records on 26 March 1992. The album is named after a Maya Angelou poem And Still I Rise and features the singles "Where Love Lives (Come on In)" and "Make It on My Own". The tracks on this album were produced by Lati Kronlund, Steve Anderson, Arthur Baker, David Barratt and John Waddell. And Still I Rise peaked at No. 53 on the UK Official Charts and No. 3 on the U.S. Billboard Hot Dance Club Play chart.

== Track listing ==
No.	Title	Writer(s)	Length
1.	"Make It on My Own"	Steve Anderson; Alison Limerick	5:09
2.	"Gettin' It Right"	Anderson; Limerick	6:20
3.	"Where Love Lives (Come on In)"	Lati Kronlund	3:36
4.	"Hear My Call"	Anderson; Limerick; Clive Griffin	5:21
5.	"Trouble"	Anderson; Limerick	6:42
6.	"Come Back (For Real Love)"	Kronlund; Arthur Baker	4:05
7.	"Tell Me What You Mean"	Limerick; Barratt	5:01
8.	"Let's Make a Memory"	Ford; McFarlane	5:38
9.	"You and I"	Limerick; Anderson	6:11
10.	"The Difference Is You"	Limerick; Griffin; Anderson	5:45
Total length:			54:51

== Personnel ==
- Steve Anderson – keyboards (1, 2, 4, 5, 9, 10)
- Eric Kupper – keyboards (3)
- Peter Schwartz – keyboards (3)
- Arthur Baker – keyboards (6)
- Lati Kronlund – keyboards (6)
- Bill Clift – keyboards (7)
- David Barratt – keyboards (7)
- Joelle Blanc – keyboards (7)
- John Waddell – keyboards (8)
- Simon Duffy – keyboards (8)
- Tony Remy – guitar (1, 2)
- J.J. Belle – guitar (4, 9, 10)
- Greg Lester – guitar (8)
- Camelle Hinds – bass (4, 9)
- Roger Beaujolais – vibraphone (1, 10)
- Darren Abraham – drums (4, 9); percussion (10)
- Andy Duncan – percussion (2, 4, 9)
- David Morales – percussion (3)
- Snake Davis – saxophone (10)
- John Thirkell – trumpet (2)
- Mark Feltham – harmonica (5)
- Clive Griffin – backing vocals (1, 4, 9, 10)
- Tessa Niles – backing vocals (1, 4, 9, 10)
- Zoe Caryl – backing vocals (1, 2, 4, 5, 9, 10)
- Becky Price – backing vocals (2, 5)
- Deborah Spellman – backing vocals (2, 5)
- Arthur Skeete – backing vocals (6)
- Jocelyn Brown – backing vocals (6)

== Charts ==
Chart (1992)	Peak position
Australian Albums (ARIA)	179
UK Albums (Official Charts)	53
