= Fair Tension =

Studio album by Yōko Oginome
- Released: November 21, 1989
- Recorded: 1989
- Genre: J-pop; pop rock; dance-pop
- Length: 43:42
- Language: Japanese
- Label: Victor
- Producer: Panta

Yōko Oginome chronology
Verge of Love (Japanese Version) (1989)	Fair Tension (1989)	Knock on My Door (1990)

Singles from Fair Tension
- 1. "You're My Life" Released: September 27, 1989

Fair Tension (フェア・テンション, Fea Tenshon) is the tenth studio album by Japanese singer Yōko Oginome. Produced by Panta and released through Victor Entertainment on November 21, 1989, the album features the hit single "You're My Life", as well as a Japanese-language cover of The Drifters' hit single "Under the Boardwalk". It was Oginome's last album to be released on LP. The album was reissued on April 21, 2010 with eight bonus tracks as part of Oginome's 25th anniversary celebration.

The album peaked at No. 12 on Oricon's albums chart and sold over 49,000 copies.

== Track listing ==
Side A
No.	Title	Lyrics	Music	Arrangement	Length
1.	"Jōnetsu" ((情熱; "Passion"))	Panta	Kisaburō Suzuki	Tatsumi Yano	4:47
2.	"Heartbreak wo Buttobase" (Hātobureiku o Buttobase (ハートブレイクをぶっとばせ; "Blow the Heartbreak"))	Shun Taguchi	Ryō Komuro	Nittoku Inoue	3:33
3.	"Under the Boardwalk" (Andā za Bōdowōku (アンダー・ザ・ボードウォーク))	Arthur Resnick; Kenny Young; Kazuko Sakata	Resnick; Young	Yano	3:49
4.	"Sennen Roman" ((千年浪漫; "Millennium Romance"))	Yukinojo Mori	Joey Carbone	Shirō Sagisu	5:03
5.	"Yūwaku no Machi de" ((誘惑の街で; "In the City of Temptation"))	Panta	Masayuki Kuzuguchi	N. Inoue	4:50
Total length:					22:04

Side B
No.	Title	Lyrics	Music	Arrangement	Length
1.	"Morning Call" (Mōningu Kōru (モーニング・コール))	Mayumi Hara	Kuzuguchi	N. Inoue; Hitoshi Haba	4:34
2.	"Rhetorica" (Retorika (レトリカ))	Hitoshi Shinohara	Toshiyuki Sekiguchi	Sagisu	4:17
3.	"Beach Drive" (Bīchi Doraibu (ビーチ・ドライブ))	Masao Urino	Suzuki	Jun Satō	4:00
4.	"Kinō Yori Kagayaite" ((昨日より輝いて; "Shining Brighter Than Yesterday"))	Panta	Panta	Satō	4:40
5.	"You're My Life (Album Mix)" (Yua Mai Raifu (ユア・マイ・ライフ (YOU’RE MY LIFE) ~ALBUM MIX~))	Urino; James Christian	Christian	Yano	4:05
Total length:					21:38

2010 bonus tracks
No.	Title	Lyrics	Music	Arrangement	Length
11.	"Shōnan Heartbreak" (Shōnan Hātobureiku (湘南ハートブレイク))	Urino	Yūji Ōtaguro	Yano	3:55
12.	"Koishikute" ((恋しくて; "I Miss You"))	Keiko Asō	Tetsuji Hayashi	Motoki Funayama	4:03
13.	"You're My Life"	Urino; Christian	Christian	Yano	3:57
14.	"Pink Sapphire" (Pinku Safaia (ピンク・サファイア))	Yoshiko Miura	Keiju Ishikawa	Yano	4:02
15.	"You're My Life" (Version II)	Urino; Christian	Christian	Atsushi Onozawa	4:46
16.	"This Girl"	Asō	Yoshimasa Inoue	Ryō Yonemitsu	4:24
17.	"Under the Boardwalk" (New Version)	Resnick; Young; Sakata	Resnick; Young		3:51
18.	"Kinō Yori Kagayaite" (New Version)	Panta	Panta		4:42
Total length:					33:43

== Charts ==
Chart (1989)	Peak position
Japanese Albums (Oricon)	12

== See also ==
- 1989 in Japanese music
