= Verge of Love =

1988 album by Yōko Oginome

Studio album by Yōko Oginome
- Released: December 17, 1988
- Recorded: 1988
- Studios: Tarpan Studios, San Rafael, California
- Genres: Pop; R&B
- Length: 51:41
- Label: Victor
- Producer: Narada Michael Walden

Yōko Oginome chronology
CD-Rider (1988)	Verge of Love (1988)	Verge of Love (Japanese Version) (1989)

Verge of Love (ヴァージ・オブ・ラヴ, Vāji obu Ravu) is the eighth studio album by Japanese pop singer Yōko Oginome. Released through Victor Entertainment on December 17, 1988, it was Oginome's first English-language album. The album was produced by Narada Michael Walden, who co-wrote the songs with Walter Afanasieff, Jeffrey Cohen, Joyce Imbesi, and Preston Glass. No singles from the album were released, but "Passages of Time" was re-recorded as a single in 1993. Verge of Love was reissued on April 21, 2010, with two bonus tracks as part of Oginome's 25th anniversary celebration.

The album peaked at No. 5 on Oricon's albums chart and at No. 90 on Oricon's 1989 year-ending albums chart. It also sold over 136,000 copies.

== Track listing ==
All music is arranged by Narada Michael Walden, except where indicated.

Side A
No.	Title	Writer(s)	Length
1.	"This Could Be the Night"	Walden; Walter Afanasieff; Liz Jackson	4:04
2.	"Something About You"	Walden; Afanasieff; Jackson	4:37
3.	"Passages of Time"	Walden; Afanasieff; Jeffrey Cohen	4:51
4.	"Wicked"	Walden; Joe Johnson	5:07
5.	"Verge of Love"	Walden; Joyce Imbesi; Carolyn Hedrich	6:56
Total length:			25:37

Side B
No.	Title	Writer(s)	Length
1.	"Postcard from Paris"	Preston Glass	5:50
2.	"Swoopin' In"	Walden; Cohen	5:19
3.	"Is It True"	Walden; Glass; Cohen	5:13
4.	"Dizzy, Dizzy, Dizzy"	Walden; Cohen	4:37
5.	"You Take It All Away"	Walden; Cohen	4:55
Total length:			26:03

2010 bonus tracks
No.	Title	Writer(s)	Arrangement	Length
11.	"Passages of Time" (Hot New Version)	Walden; Afanasieff; Cohen	Rod Antoon	5:54
12.	"Something About You" (Hot New Version)	Walden; Afanasieff; Jackson	Antoon	5:25
Total length:				11:19

== Charts ==
Weekly charts

Chart (1988)	Peak position
Japanese Albums (Oricon)	5

Year-end charts

Chart (1989)	Peak position
Japanese Albums (Oricon)	90

== Japanese version ==
Verge of Love

Studio album by Yōko Oginome
- Released: February 21, 1989
- Recorded: 1988
- Studios: Tarpan Studios, San Rafael, California
- Genres: J-pop; R&B
- Length: 51:52
- Language: Japanese
- Label: Victor
- Producer: Narada Michael Walden

Yōko Oginome chronology
Verge of Love (English Version) (1988)	Verge of Love (1989)	Fair Tension (1989)

Singles from Verge of Love
- 1. "Verge of Love" Released: January 18, 1989

The Japanese version of Verge of Love was released on February 21, 1989, as Oginome's ninth studio album. The title track was released as a single on January 18, 1989, and peaked at No. 5 on Oricon's singles chart. The album was reissued on April 21, 2010, with one bonus track as part of Oginome's 25th anniversary celebration.

The album peaked at No. 11 on Oricon's albums chart and sold over 52,000 copies.

=== Track listing ===
Side A
No.	Title	Writer(s)	Japanese lyrics	Length
1.	"This Could Be the Night" ((ジス・クッド・ビー・ザ・ナイト))	Narada Michael Walden; Walter Afanasieff; Liz Jackson	Masao Urino	4:07
2.	"Something About You" ((サムシング・アバウト・ユー))	Walden; Afanasieff; Jackson	Urino	4:37
3.	"Passages of Time" ((パッセージ・オブ・タイム))	Walden; Afanasieff; Jeffrey Cohen	Shintarō Hirai	4:52
4.	"Wicked" ((ウィッケッド))	Walden; Joe Johnson	Urino	5:08
5.	"Verge of Love" ((ヴァージ・オブ・ラヴ))	Walden; Joyce Imbesi; Carolyn Hedrich	Hirai	6:55
Total length:				25:40

Side B
No.	Title	Writer(s)	Japanese lyrics	Length
1.	"Postcard from Paris" ((ポストカード・フロム・パリ))	Preston Glass	Hitoshi Shinohara	5:51
2.	"Swoopin' In" ((スゥーピン・イン))	Walden; Cohen	Urino	5:20
3.	"Is It True" ((イズ・イット・トゥルー))	Walden; Glass; Cohen	Hirai	5:15
4.	"Dizzy, Dizzy, Dizzy" ((ディジー、ディジー、ディジー))	Walden; Cohen	Urino	4:39
5.	"You Take It All Away" ((ユー・テイク・イット・オール・アウェイ))	Walden; Cohen	Shinohara	5:05
Total length:				26:11

2010 bonus track
No.	Title	Writer(s)	Japanese lyrics	Length
11.	"Verge of Love (Single Version)" ((ヴァージ・オブ・ラヴ(シングル・バージョン)))	Walden; Imbesi; Hedrich	Hirai	5:16

=== Charts ===
Chart (1989)	Peak position
Japanese Albums (Oricon)	11

== Personnel ==
- Walter Afanasieff – keyboards, synthesizers, drum programming
- David Sancious – keyboards, synthesizer
- Rem Klyce – synthesizer
- Randy Jackson – synthesizer, bass
- Joyce Imbesi – piano
- Corrado Rustici – guitars
- Vernon "Ice" Black – rhythm guitar
- Chris Camozzi – rhythm guitar
- Alan Glass – rhythm guitar
- Bob Castell – rhythm guitar
- Joy Julks – bass
- Narada Michael Walden – drums
- Greg "Gigi" Gonaway – cymbals
- Michael Carabello – congas, percussion
- Bongo Bob Smith – percussion programming
- Premik Russell Tubbs – flute, tenor saxophone
- Kitty Beethoven – backing vocals
- Pride & Joy – backing vocals
- Claytoven Richardson – backing vocals
- Jennifer Hall – backing vocals
- Jim Gilstrap – backing vocals
- Kevin "Stone Jam" Dorsey – backing vocals
- Carolyn Hedrich – backing vocals
- Carla Vaughn – backing vocals
- Kelly Kool – backing vocals

== Cover versions ==
- D'atra Hicks covered "Something About You" on her 1989 self-titled debut album.

== See also ==
- 1988 in Japanese music
