= Knock on My Door (album) =

Studio album by Yōko Oginome
- Released: August 21, 1990
- Recorded: 1990
- Genres: J-pop; pop rock
- Length: 52:51
- Language: Japanese
- Label: Victor
- Producer: Ken Yoshida

Yōko Oginome chronology
Fair Tension (1989)	Knock on My Door (1990)	'91 Oginome Collection (1990)

Singles from Knock on My Door
- 1. "Gallery" Released: June 27, 1990

Knock on My Door (ノック・オン・マイ・ドア, Nokku on Mai Doa) is the eleventh studio album by Japanese singer Yōko Oginome. Produced by Ken Yoshida and released through Victor Entertainment on August 21, 1990, the album features the hit single "Gallery", but with lyrics different from the single version. The album was reissued on April 21, 2010 with five bonus tracks as part of Oginome's 25th anniversary celebration.

The album peaked at No. 5 on Oricon's albums chart and sold over 46,000 copies.

== Track listing ==
No.	Title	Lyrics	Music	Arrangement	Length
1.	"Machikirenai Hitomi" ((待ちきれない瞳; "Eyes I Can't Wait For"))	Natsumi Tadano	Yoshimitsu Ōba	Shingo Kobayashi	3:34
2.	"Tobira wa Miracle" (Tobira wa Mirakuru (扉はミラクル; "The Door Is a Miracle"))	Kenzō Saeki	Nobody	Kobayashi	4:35
3.	"Knock on My Door"	Bun Onoe	Nobody	Yoshiyuki Sahashi	5:31
4.	"Angel Eyes"	Saeki	Ken Yoshida	Sahashi	4:30
5.	"Gallery (Fantasy Mix)" (Gyararī (ギャラリー (FANTASY Mix)))	Yōsui Inoue	Inoue	Atsushi Onozawa	4:39
6.	"Yes, It's Me"	Miharu Koshi	Nobody	Yoshida	5:18
7.	"Type: B"	Yasuharu Konishi	Saeko Suzuki	Sahashi	4:12
8.	"Julia"	Koshi	Suzuki	Kobayashi	3:50
9.	"Beat Goes On"	Saeki	Ginji Itō	Yoshida	3:44
10.	"Koi ni Access" (Koi ni Akusesu (恋にアクセス; "Access to Love"))	Saeki	Nobody	Yoshida	4:00
11.	"Kirei ni Naritai" ((きれいになりたい; "I Want to Be Beautiful"))	Yukinojo Mori	Toshio Kamei	Yoshida	3:44
12.	"Birthday (Epilogue)" (Bāsudē ~ Epirōgu (Birthday 〜エピローグ))	Yoshida	Yoshida	Yoshida	5:09
Total length:					52:51

2010 bonus tracks
No.	Title	Lyrics	Music	Arrangement	Length
13.	"Gallery" (Gyararī (ギャラリー))	Inoue	Inoue	Onozawa	4:42
14.	"On Bed"	Inoue	Natsumi Hirai	Onozawa	3:12
15.	"Shōnen no Hitomi ni..." ((少年の瞳に…; "In the Boy's Eyes...))	Keiko Asō	Project.K	Yoshida	5:14
16.	"A Happy New Year"	Asō	Yoshida	Yoshida	3:44
17.	"Symphonic Gallery" (Shinfonikku Gyararī (Symphonicギャラリー))	Inoue	Inoue	Akira Senju	5:58
Total length:					22:52

== Charts ==
Chart (1990)	Peak position
Japanese Albums (Oricon)	5

== See also ==
- 1990 in Japanese music
