= Trust Me (Yōko Oginome album) =

Studio album by Yōko Oginome
- Released: July 3, 1991
- Recorded: 1991
- Genre: J-pop; pop rock; dance-pop
- Length: 44:59
- Language: Japanese
- Label: Victor
- Producer: Ken Yoshida

Yōko Oginome chronology
'91 Oginome Collection (1990)	Trust Me (1991)	New Take: Best Collections '92 (1991)

Singles from Trust Me
- 1. "Bijo to Yajū" Released: June 5, 1991

Trust Me (トラスト・ミー, Torasuto Mī) is the twelfth studio album by Japanese singer Yōko Oginome. Produced by Ken Yoshida and released through Victor Entertainment on July 3, 1991, the album features the hit single "Bijo to Yajū". The song "Ame no Ishi" is a Japanese-language cover of Pebbles' 1990 song "Why Do I Believe". The album was reissued on May 26, 2010 with seven bonus tracks as part of Oginome's 25th anniversary celebration.

The album peaked at No. 25 on Oricon's albums chart and sold over 23,000 copies.

== Track listing ==
No.	Title	Lyrics	Music	Arrangement	Length
1.	"Wakatte" ((わかって; "I Know"))	Wakako Kaku	Ken Yoshida	Shōhei Narabe	4:30
2.	"Moonlight Blue"	Yumi Yoshimoto	Yoshimitsu Ōba	Narabe	4:49
3.	"Prelude to "A" Kiss"	Kako	Yoshida	Shingo Kobayashi	4:49
4.	"Because"	Yume Suzuki	Suzuki	Ryōichi Kuniyoshi	5:35
5.	"Ame no Ishi" ((雨の石; "Rain Stone"))	Babyface; Kaku	Babyface	Kuniyoshi	4:01
6.	"C'est la vie"	Kaku	Nobody	Narabe	3:55
7.	"Lana"	Yoshimoto	Nobody	Yoshida	4:05
8.	"Himawari" ((ひまわり; "Sunflower"))	Neko Oikawa	Nobody	Kuniyoshi	4:35
9.	"Sunao na Koi" ((素直な恋; "Honest Love"))	Oikawa	Ōba	Kobayashi	4:17
10.	"Bijo to Yajū" ((美女と野獣; "Beauty and the Beast"))	Masumi Kawamura	Toshinobu Kubota	Yōichirō "Wacky" Kakizaki; Kōji "Kitaroh" Nakamura	4:19
Total length:					44:59

2010 bonus tracks
No.	Title	Lyrics	Music	Arrangement	Length
11.	"I Know You"	Kaku	Kakizaki	Kakizaki	4:25
12.	"Bijo to Yajū (Savanna Mix)" ((美女と野獣 -savanna mix-; "Beauty and the Beast"))	Kawamura	Kubota	Kakizaki; Nakamura	5:28
13.	"Bijo to Yajū (Jungle Version)" ((美女と野獣 -Jungle Version-; "Beauty and the Beast"))	Kawamura	Kubota	Kakizaki; Nakamura	4:11
14.	"Because (Version II)"	Suzuki	Suzuki	Kuniyoshi	5:39
15.	"Morning Rain"	Kawamura	Kubota	Kakizaki	3:53
16.	"Humanoid Shinkaron" (Hyūmanoido Shinkaron (ヒューマノイド進化論; "Humanoid Evolution"))	Jun Togawa	Mark Davis	Davis	4:35
17.	"Melancholic Cyber Bay" (Merankorikku Saibā Bei (感傷的(メランコリック)サイバー・ベイ))	Togawa	Davis	Davis	4:02
Total length:					32:17

== Charts ==
Chart (1991)	Peak position
Japanese Albums (Oricon)	25
