= Look Up to the Sky =

1997 single by Yōko Oginome

Single by Yōko Oginome

from the album Chains
- Language: Japanese
- B-side: "Natural Woman"
- Released: March 21, 1997
- Recorded: 1996
- Genre: J-pop; R&B
- Length: 5:15
- Label: Victor
- Songwriters: Ua; Shinichi Osawa
- Producer: Shinichi Ōsawa

Yōko Oginome singles chronology
"Ashita wa Hareru!" (1995)	"Look Up to the Sky" (1997)	"Make It on My Own" (1997)

Music video
- "Look Up to the Sky" on YouTube

"Look Up to the Sky" is the 36th single by Japanese singer Yōko Oginome. Written by Ua and Shinichi Osawa, the single was released on March 21, 1997, by Victor Entertainment.

== Background and release ==
Oginome had the idea of collaborating with Shinichi Osawa after listening to a CD of Ōsawa's band Mondo Grosso, and she wanted a similar groove to her next musical project. "Look Up to the Sky" was written by Ua, who was pregnant with her first son Nijirō Murakami at the time.

== Track listing ==
No.	Title	Lyrics	Music	Arrangement	Length
1.	"Look Up to the Sky"	Ua	Shinichi Osawa	Osawa	5:15
2.	"Natural Woman"	Monday Michiru	Monday Michiru	Monday Michiru	5:27
3.	"Look Up to the Sky (Instrumental)"				5:15
