= Songs & Voice =

Studio album by Yōko Oginome
- Released: November 25, 2009
- Recorded: 2009
- Genre: J-pop
- Length: 58:28
- Language: Japanese
- Label: Victor

Yōko Oginome chronology
Golden Best (2009)	Songs & Voice (2009)	Super Groover the Box: The Perfect Singles (2009)

Songs & Voice (ソングズ・アンド・ヴォイス, Songusu ando Voisu) is a cover album by Japanese singer/songwriter Yōko Oginome. Released through Victor Entertainment on November 25, 2009, to celebrate Oginome's 25th anniversary, the album features covers of popular male-oriented kayōkyoku and J-pop songs.

== Track listing ==
No.	Title	Writer(s)	Original artist	Length
1.	"Down Town"	Ginji Itō; Tatsuro Yamashita	Sugar Babe	3:39
2.	"Yes-No"	Kazumasa Oda	Off Course	4:13
3.	"Kataomoi" ((片想い; "Unrequited Love"))	Shōgo Hamada	Shōgo Hamada	4:32
4.	"Kokoro Moyou" ((心もよう))	Yōsui Inoue	Yōsui Inoue	3:25
5.	"Nijū-ni Sai no Wakare" ((22才の別れ; "A 22-year-old Farewell"))	Shōzō Ise	Kaze	3:16
6.	"Sukoshi wa Watashi ni Ai wo Kudasai" ((少しは私に愛を下さい; "Give Me A Little Love"))	Kei Ogura	Kei Ogura	3:22
7.	"Kandagawa" ((神田川; "Kanda River"))	Makoto Kitajō; Kōsetsu Minami	Kaguyahime	3:05
8.	"Kōri no Sekai" ((氷の世界; "Ice World"))	Inoue	Inoue	3:36
9.	"Otoko to Onna" ((男と女; "A Man and a Woman"))	Ryō Asuka	Chage and Aska	4:21
10.	"Shūshifu" ((秋止符; "End of Autumn"))	Shinji Tanimura; Takao Horiuchi	Alice	4:15
11.	"Seishun no Kage" ((青春の影; "Shadow of Youth"))	Kazuo Zaitsu	Tulip	3:54
12.	"Misaki Meguri" ((岬めぐり))	Michio Yamagami; Kōtarō Yamamoto	Kōtaro Yamamoto	4:12
13.	"Kekkon Shiyōyo" ((結婚しようよ; "Let's Get Married"))	Takuro Yoshida	Takuro Yoshida	2:53
14.	"Candy [Bonus Track]" (Kyandi (キャンディ))	Takashi Matsumoto; Shinji Harada	Shinji Harada	4:09
15.	"Musōbana [Bonus Track]" ((夢想花; "Dream Flower"))	Hiroshi Madoka	Hiroshi Madoka	5:29
Total length:				58:28

- Tracks 1, 2, 4, 9, 13, 14, and 15 arranged by Toshiya Shimizu.
- Tracks 3, 5, 6, and 10 arranged by Kaoru Ōhori.
- Tracks 7, 8, 11, and 12 arranged by Yutaka Kaburagi.
