= From My Garden =

1997 single by Yōko Oginome

Single by Yōko Oginome

from the album Chains
- Language: Japanese
- B-side: "Rainbow Chameleon"
- Released: November 21, 1997
- Recorded: 1997
- Genre: J-pop; pop rock
- Length: 4:56
- Label: Victor
- Songwriters: Junko Kudō; Monday Michiru
- Producer: Monday Michiru

Yōko Oginome singles chronology
"Make It on My Own" (1997)	"From My Garden" (1997)	"We'll Be Together" (1999)

Music video
- "From My Garden" on YouTube

"From My Garden" is the 38th single by Japanese singer Yōko Oginome. Written by Junko Kudō and Monday Michiru, the single was released on November 21, 1997, by Victor Entertainment.

== Track listing ==
All music is composed and arranged by Monday Michiru.

No.	Title	Lyrics	Length
1.	"From My Garden"	Junko Kudō	4:56
2.	"Rainbow Chameleon"	Monday Michiru	5:38
3.	"From My Garden (Instrumental)"		4:56
