= CD-Rider =

Studio album by Yōko Oginome
- Released: August 24, 1988
- Recorded: 1987–1988
- Genres: J-pop; dance-pop
- Length: 49:03
- Language: Japanese
- Label: Victor

Yōko Oginome chronology
Pop Groover: The Best (1987)	CD-Rider (1988)	Verge of Love (1989)

Singles from CD-Rider
- 1. "Stranger Tonight" Released: January 21, 1988; 2. "Stardust Dream" Released: April 27, 1988; 3. "Dear (Cobalt no Kanata e)" Released: July 21, 1988

CD-Rider (シーディー・ライダー, Shī Dī Raidā) is the seventh studio album by Japanese singer Yōko Oginome. Released through Victor Entertainment on August 24, 1988, the album features the hit singles "Stranger Tonight", "Stardust Dream" and "Dear (Cobalt no Kanata e)", the first two having hit No. 1. It was reissued on April 21, 2010, with five bonus tracks as part of Oginome's 25th anniversary celebration.

The album hit No. 1 on Oricon's albums chart and sold over 175,000 copies.

== Track listing ==
Side A
No.	Title	Lyrics	Music	Arrangement	Length
1.	"Dear (Cobalt no Kanata e)" (Diā ~Kobaruto no Kanata e~ (DEAR ~コバルトの彼方へ~; "Dear (Beyond Cobalt)"))	Takafumi Sotoma	Ryō Asuka	Nobuyuki Shimizu	4:54
2.	"Palm Tree Candle" (Pāmu Turī Kyandoru (パームトゥリー・キャンドル))	Masao Urino	Kyōhei Tsutsumi	Hiroshi Shinkawa; Ryō Yonemitsu	3:41
3.	"Superstition"	Masumi Kawamura	Yoshio Nomura	Shirō Sagisu	3:47
4.	"Jungle Dance [Version II]" (Janguru Dansu (ジャングル・ダンス [Version II]))	Yukinojo Mori	Tetsuya Komuro	Yonemitsu	4:10
5.	"Persian Rose" (Perushan Rōzu (ペルシャン・ローズ))	Urino	Nobody	Yonemitsu	3:57
6.	"Asa no Machi" ((朝の街; "Morning City"))	Asuka	Asuka	Shimizu	3:53
Total length:					24:24

Side B
No.	Title	Lyrics	Music	Arrangement	Length
1.	"Eye Spy the Night"	Urino	Tsutsumi	Shinkawa	4:00
2.	"Stardust Dream [Version II]" (Sutādasuto Dorīmu (スターダスト・ドリーム [Version II]))	Reiji Asō	Yoshimasa Inoue	Shinkawa	3:30
3.	"After 5 wa Paradise" (Afutā Faibu wa Paradaisu (アフター5はパラダイス; "Paradise Is After 5"))	Keiko Asō	Nobody	Motoki Funayama	4:37
4.	"Stranger Tonight [Version II]" (Sutorenjā Tunaito (ストレンジャーtonight [Version II]))	Urino	Nobody	Yonemitsu	4:05
5.	"Suteki ni Fade Away" ((素敵にFADE AWAY; "Fade Away Nicely"))	Yoshio Nomura	Hiro Nagasawa	Sagisu	3:52
6.	"Gin'iro no Paper Moon" (Gin'iro no Pēpā Mūn (銀色のペーパームーン; "Silver Colored Paper Moon"))	Masami Tozawa	Tsunehiro Izumi	Kazuo Shiina	4:31
Total length:					24:38

2010 bonus tracks
No.	Title	Lyrics	Music	Arrangement	Length
13.	"Stranger Tonight" (Sutorenjā Tunaito (ストレンジャーtonight))	Urino	Nobody	Yonemitsu	4:06
14.	"Bus Stop"	Graham Gouldman	Gouldman	Akira Nishihira	3:44
15.	"Stardust Dream" (Sutādasuto Dorīmu (スターダスト・ドリーム))	R. Asō	Inoue	Shinkawa	3:33
16.	"Jungle Dance" (Janguru Dansu (ジャングル・ダンス))	Mori	Komuro	Yonemitsu	3:47
17.	"Dear (Cobalt no Kanata e) [Single Version]" (Diā ~Kobaruto no Kanata e~ (DEAR ~コバルトの彼方へ~; "Dear (Beyond Cobalt)"))	Sotoma	Asuka	Shimizu	4:06
Total length:					19:17

== Charts ==
Weekly charts

Chart (1988)	Peak position
Japanese Albums (Oricon)	1

Year-end charts

Chart (1988)	Peak position
Japanese Albums (Oricon)	57

== See also ==
- 1988 in Japanese music
