= Voice Nova =

EP by Yōko Oginome
- Released: February 22, 2006
- Recorded: 2005
- Genres: J-pop; bossa nova
- Length: 25:43
- Label: Victor
- Producer: Masanori Kamide

Yōko Oginome chronology
Yōko Oginome Best Selection (2005)	Voice Nova (2006)	Golden Best (2009)

Voice Nova (ヴォイスノーヴァ, Voisu Nōva) is an EP of cover versions by the Japanese singer/songwriter Yōko Oginome. Released through Victor Entertainment on February 22, 2006, the album contains bossa nova versions of six English-language hit songs.

The album peaked at No. 282 on Oricon's albums chart.

== Track listing ==
No.	Title	Writer(s)	Original artist	Length
1.	"I Love Your Smile"	Jarvis La Rue Baker; Sylvester Jackson; Narada Michael Walden; Shanice Wilson	Shanice	3:48
2.	"De Do Do Do, De Da Da Da"	Sting	The Police	5:19
3.	"Part-Time Lover"	Stevie Wonder	Stevie Wonder	4:41
4.	"Girls Just Want to Have Fun"	Robert Hazard	Cyndi Lauper	3:22
5.	"Conga"	Enrique E. Garcia	Miami Sound Machine	5:00
6.	"Merry Jane"	Christopher Lyn; Hiro Tsunoda	Hiro Tsunoda	3:31
Total length:				25:43

== Charts ==
Chart (2006)	Peak position
Japanese Albums (Oricon)	282
