= Shōnen no Hitomi ni... =

1990 single by Yōko Oginome

Single by Yōko Oginome

from the album New Take: Best Collections '92
- Language: Japanese
- English title: In the Boy's Eyes...
- B-side: "A Happy New Year"
- Released: December 5, 1990
- Recorded: 1990
- Genre: J-pop
- Label: Victor
- Songwriters: Keiko Asō; Project.K

Yōko Oginome singles chronology
| "Gallery" (1989) | "Shōnen no Hitomi ni..." (1990) | "Bijo to Yajū" (1991) |

Music video
- "Shōnen no Hitomi ni..." on YouTube

"Shōnen no Hitomi ni..." (少年の瞳に…; lit. "In the Boy's Eyes...") is the 21st single by Japanese singer Yōko Oginome. Written by Keiko Asō and Project.K, the single was released on December 5, 1990 by Victor Entertainment.

== Background and release ==
The song was used as the ending theme of the Fuji TV quiz show Naruhodo! The World.

"Shōnen no Hitomi ni..." peaked at No. 24 on Oricon's singles chart and sold over 28,000 copies.

== Track listing ==
All lyrics are written by Keiko Asō; all music is arranged by Ken Yoshida.

| No. | Title | Music | Length |
|---|---|---|---|
| 1. | "Shōnen no Hitomi ni..." ((少年の瞳に…; "In the Boy's Eyes...")) | Project.K |
| 2. | "A Happy New Year" | Yoshida |
| 3. | "Shōnen no Hitomi ni... (Original Karaoke)" ((少年の瞳に…(オリジナル・カラオケ); "In the Boy's Eyes... (Original Karaoke))) |
| 4. | "A Happy New Year (Original Karaoke)" ((A HAPPY NEW YEAR(オリジナル・カラオケ))) |

== Charts ==
| Chart (1990) | Peak position |
|---|---|
| Oricon Weekly Singles Chart | 24 |

== See also ==
- 1990 in Japanese music
