= Alison Limerick =

British singer

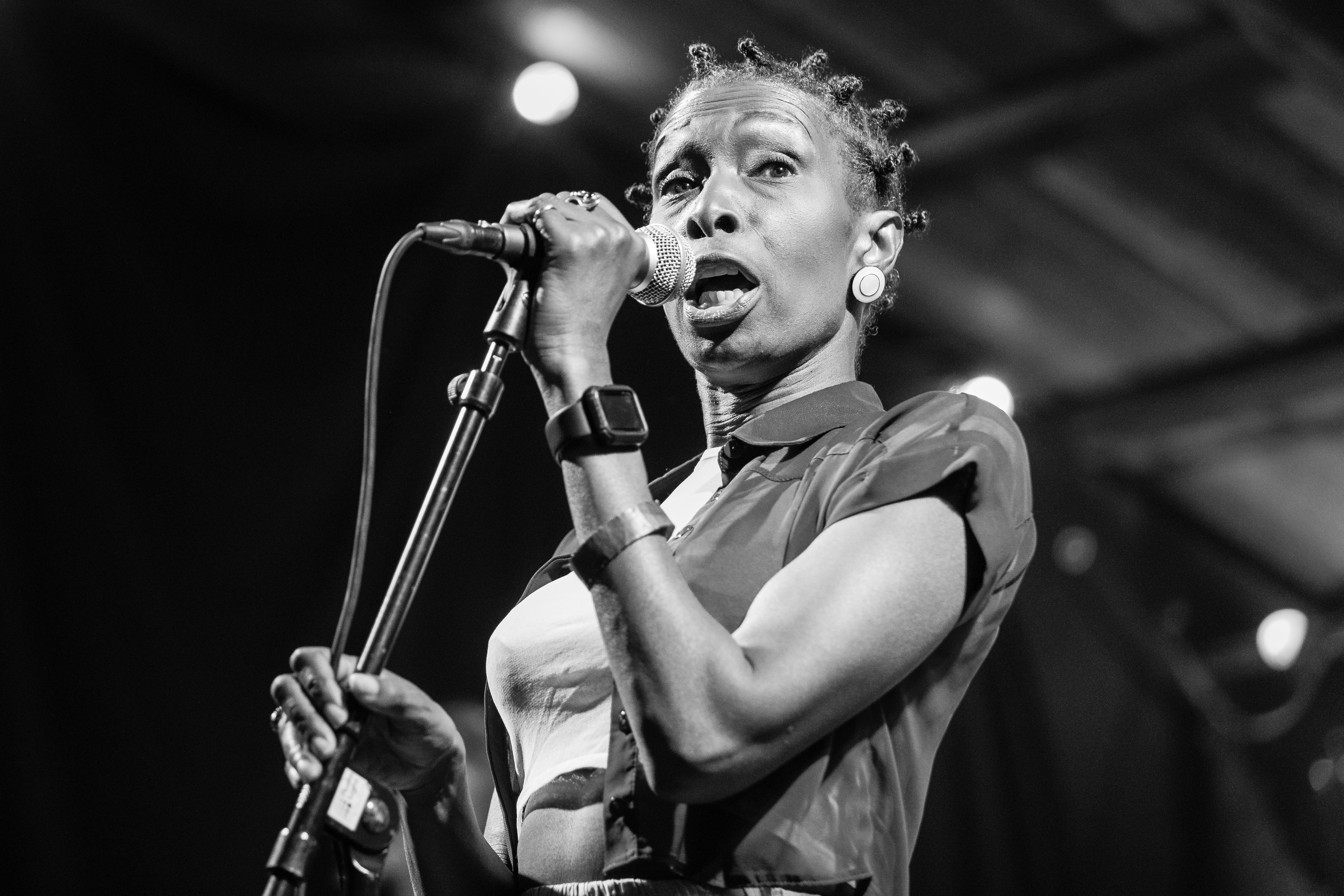
- Limerick on stage in 2022

Background information
- Born: 1959 (age 66–67)
- Origin: Stepney, London, England
- Genres: House, dance, dance-pop, pop, soul, jazz
- Occupation: Singer-songwriter
- Instrument: Vocals
- Years active: 1980–present
- Labels: Arista/BMG, X-Es
- Website: Official Website

Alison T. Limerick (born 1959, Stepney) is a British singer-songwriter who scored success in the 1990s with the club anthem "Where Love Lives", which was her solo debut and a No. 3 hit on the U.S. Hot Dance Club Play in 1991.

== Biography ==
Limerick attended the London School of Contemporary Dance and switched to a music career, first as a backing vocalist, in the 1980s. She sang on Grand Union Orchestra's 1986 world jazz album The Song of Many Tongues, written by Tony Haynes.

In 1989, she made a brief appearance as an African sorceress in Bob Rafelson's film, Mountains of the Moon. She has also contributed to This Mortal Coil, singing on two of its albums: Filigree & Shadow (1986) and Blood (1991). Another 4AD related contribution found her singing on the Pieter Nooten & Michael Brook album Sleeps with the Fishes (1987) on the song "Equal Ways." She appeared on Peter Murphy's album Holy Smoke and released her own first album in 1992.

Limerick is best known for her 1990s club anthems, her most successful and best known track being "Where Love Lives," her only US release, which was originally a club success in 1991, and a UK Singles Chart No. 9 hit when remixed in 1996. Her 1992 hit "Make It on My Own" reached No. 16 in the UK chart. These tracks were included on the album And Still I Rise, which was also released in 1992. Three further albums were released throughout the 1990s; With a Twist, Club Classics, and Spirit Rising. The single "Put Your Faith in Me" came out in 1997.

"Where Love Lives" has made three separate appearances in the US Hot Dance Club Play chart in 1991 (No. 3), 1996 (No. 4) and 2003 (No. 16). None of her albums were released in the US. Limerick was the featured vocalist on the 1995 James Taylor Quartet album In the Hand of the Inevitable, on the album's three solo vocal tracks. The tracks included the single "Love Will Keep Us Together" and the album remains the Acid Jazz label's biggest selling album.

Limerick has worked with many artists and songwriters such as George Michael, Courtney Pine and Lamont Dozier. In 1993 she sang backing vocals on M People's song "Melody of Life" from the album Elegant Slumming. She appears in the British movie Collusion as the jazz singer and she is also notable as one of the (uncredited) singers heard performing the closing title song on each episode of Blackadder the Third.

She continues to record and perform live with Brooklyn Funk Essentials, for PAs, and with her own band. She can be heard singing soul and jazz, in various venues across Europe, and found being the Dance Diva in house music venues around the world performing her all-time classics like "Where Love Lives" and "Make It on My Own".

== Discography ==
=== Albums ===
- And Still I Rise (1992) UK No. 53
- With a Twist (1994)
- Club Classics (1996)
- Spirit Rising (1998)

=== Singles ===
| Year | Single | Chart peaks | | | | | | Certifications | Album | Ref. |
| Year | Single | EUR | UK | UK Dance | UK Club | SCO | US Dance | Certifications | Album | Ref. |
|---|---|---|---|---|---|---|---|---|---|---|
| 1990 | "Where Love Lives" | | 87 | | 2 | | — | BPI: Gold | And Still I Rise | |
| 1991 | "Where Love Lives (Come On In) '91" | 49 | 27 | 2 | 3 | | 3 | | And Still I Rise | |
| 1991 | "Come Back (For Real Love)" | | 53 | 7 | 5 | | — | | And Still I Rise | |
| 1992 | "Make It on My Own" | 64 | 16 | 11 | 3 | | 6 | | And Still I Rise | |
| 1992 | "Gettin' It Right" | | 57 | 15 | 5 | | — | | And Still I Rise | |
| 1992 | "Hear My Call" | | 73 | 12 | 63 | | — | | And Still I Rise | |
| 1994 | "Time of Our Lives" | 93 | 36 | 3 | 5 | | — | | With a Twist | |
| 1994 | "Love Come Down" | 95 | 36 | 7 | 8 | | — | | With a Twist | |
| 1996 | "Where Love Lives '96" | 20 | 9 | 1 | 1 | 21 | 4 | | Club Classics | |
| 1996 | "Make It on My Own '96" | 84 | 30 | 13 | 7 | 33 | — | | Club Classics | |
| 1997 | "Put Your Faith in Me" | | 42 | 23 | 6 | 52 | — | | Spirit Rising | |
| 1998 | "Let's Hold On (To Love)" | | — | | | | — | | Spirit Rising | |
| 2003 | "Where Love Lives '03" | | 44 | 5 | | 49 | 16 | | Single only | |
"—" denotes releases that did not chart or were not released.

=== As featured artist ===
- "My Father", "Alone", and "Drugs" with This Mortal Coil from Filigree & Shadow (1986)
- "Andialu", "Nature's Way" with This Mortal Coil from Blood (1991)
- "Magic's Back (Theme from The Ghosts of Oxford Street)" with Malcolm McLaren (1991) UK No. 42
- "Love Will Keep Us Together" with James Taylor Quartet (1995) UK No. 63
- "Lead You to Heaven" with And If (2006)
- "In the Blood" with X-Press 2 (2012)
- "Bye Bye" with Lenny Fontana (2018)
