= We'll Be Together (Yōko Oginome song) =

1999 single by Yōko Oginome

Single by Yōko Oginome
- Language: Japanese
- B-side: "Taiyō no Kisetsu"
- Released: June 23, 1999
- Recorded: 1999
- Genre: J-pop
- Length: 4:59
- Label: Victor
- Songwriters: Yōko Oginome; Steve Barakatt
- Producer: Steve Barakatt

Yōko Oginome singles chronology
"From My Garden" (1997)	"We'll Be Together" (1999)	"Feeling" (1999)

Music video
- "We'll Be Together" on YouTube

"We'll Be Together" is the 39th single by Japanese singer/songwriter Yōko Oginome. Written by Oginome and Steve Barakatt, the single was released on June 23, 1999, by Victor Entertainment.

== Background and release ==
The song was used as the ending theme song of the 1999 season of the NTV cultural documentary series Do You Really Know About It?! (知ってるつもり?!, Shitteru Tsumori?!). The B-side, "Taiyō no Kisetsu", was used by Japan Post for its commercials. Both songs were co-written by Oginome, which was a first in her singles discography.

"We'll be Together" peaked at No. 83 on Oricon's singles chart and sold over 3,000 copies, becoming Oginome's last new single to appear on any singles charts.

== Track listing ==
No.	Title	Lyrics	Music	Arrangement	Length
1.	"We'll Be Together"	Yōko Oginome	Steve Barakatt	Hiroaki Hayama	4:59
2.	"Taiyō no Kisetsu" ((太陽の季節; "Seasons of the Sun"))	Oginome; T2ya	T2ya	Takehiro Kawabe	4:24
3.	"We'll Be Together (Original Back Track)"				4:58
4.	"Taiyō no Kisetsu (Original Back Track)"				4:24

== Charts ==
Chart (1999)	Peak position
Oricon Weekly Singles Chart	83
