= Ashita wa Hareru! =

1995 single by Yōko Oginome

Single by Yōko Oginome
- Language: Japanese
- English title: It Will Be Fine Tomorrow!
- B-side: "Heartbreaker"
- Released: August 23, 1995
- Recorded: 1995
- Genre: J-pop
- Length: 4:05
- Label: Victor
- Songwriters: Natsumi Watanabe; Tetsurō Oda

Yōko Oginome singles chronology
"Shiawase e no Jikan" (1995)	"Ashita wa Hareru!" (1995)	"Look Up to the Sky" (1997)

"Ashita wa Hareru!" (明日は晴れる!; lit. "It Will Be Fine Tomorrow!") is the 35th single by Japanese singer Yōko Oginome. Written by Natsumi Watanabe and Tetsurō Oda, the single was released on August 23, 1995, by Victor Entertainment.

== Background and release ==
The song was used as the ending theme song of the Fuji TV variety show Hey! Hey! Hey! Music Champ. It was also used as the opening theme song of the Tokyo FM radio show My Life Music, which was hosted by Oginome.

"Ashita wa Hareru!" peaked at No. 29 on Oricon's singles chart and sold over 52,000 copies.

== Track listing ==
All music is composed by Tetsurō Oda.

No.	Title	Lyrics	Arrangement	Length
1.	"Ashita wa Hareru!" ((明日は晴れる!; "It Will Be Fine Tomorrow!"))	Natsumi Watanabe	Oda	4:05
2.	"Heartbreaker"	Yō Sorano	Hiroshi Matsui	4:04
3.	"Ashita wa Hareru! (Original Karaoke)" ((明日は晴れる!(オリジナル・カラオケ); "It Will Be Fine Tomorrow! (Original Karaoke)"))
4.	"Heartbreaker (Original Karaoke)" ((HEARTBREAKER(オリジナル・カラオケ)))

== Charts ==
Chart (1995)	Peak position
Oricon Weekly Singles Chart	29
