= Shiawase e no Jikan =

1995 single by Yōko Oginome

Single by Yōko Oginome
- Language: Japanese
- English title: Time for Happiness
- B-side: "If You Love Me Now (Aishisa ni Sarawarete)"
- Released: June 21, 1995
- Recorded: 1995
- Genre: J-pop
- Length: 3:38
- Label: Victor
- Songwriter: Chika Ueda

Yōko Oginome singles chronology
"Koi no Hallelujah" (1994)	"Shiawase e no Jikan" (1995)	"Ashita wa Hareru!" (1995)

"Shiawase e no Jikan" (幸福への時間; lit. "Time for Happiness") is the 34th single by Japanese singer Yōko Oginome. Written by Chika Ueda, the single was released on June 21, 1995, by Victor Entertainment.

== Background and release ==
The song was used as the theme song of the NHK drama special Drama Shin Ginga: Nagoya Okane Monogatari (ドラマ新銀河・名古屋お金物語; Drama New Galaxy: Nagoya Money Story), which starred Oginome. The B-side, "If You Love Me Now (Aishisa ni Sarawarete)", was the opening theme of the Fuji TV drama special Shōnan Liverpool Gakuin (湘南リバプール学院, Shōnan Ribapūru Gakuin; Shōnan Liverpool Academy).

"Shiawase e no Jikan" peaked at No. 86 on Oricon's singles chart and sold over 4,000 copies.

== Track listing ==
No.	Title	Lyrics	Music	Arrangement	Length
1.	"Shiawase e no Jikan" ((幸福への時間; "Time for Happiness"))	Chika Ueda	Ueda	Akihiko Matsumoto	3:38
2.	"If You Love Me Now (Aishisa ni Sarawarete)" ((IF YOU LOVE ME NOW ~愛しさにさらわれて~; "If You Love Me Now ~Being Kidnapped by Love"))	Natsumi Watanabe; Giancarlo Pasquini	Andrea Leonardi; Pasquini	Takayuki Hijikata	5:12
3.	"Shiawase e no Jikan (Original Karaoke)" ((幸福への時間(オリジナル・カラオケ); "Time for Happiness (Original Karaoke)"))
4.	"If You Love Me Now (Aishisa ni Sarawarete) (Original Karaoke)" ((IF YOU LOVE ME NOW ~愛しさにさらわれて~(オリジナル・カラオケ); "If You Love Me Now ~Being Kidnapped by Love~ (Original Karaoke)"))

== Charts ==
Chart (1995)	Peak position
Oricon Weekly Singles Chart	86
