= Feeling (Yōko Oginome and Masatoshi Ono song) =

1999 single by Yōko Oginome and Masatoshi Ono

Single by Yōko Oginome and Masatoshi Ono
- Language: Japanese
- B-side: "Forever"
- Released: November 20, 1999
- Recorded: 1999
- Genre: J-pop; dance-pop
- Label: Victor
- Songwriter: Masatoshi Ono

Yōko Oginome singles chronology
"We'll Be Together" (1999)	"Feeling" (1999)	"Love" (2001)

Masatoshi Ono singles chronology
"Heart" (1999)	"Feeling" (1999)	"White Night" (2000)

Music video
- "Feeling" on YouTube

"Feeling" (フィーリング, Fīringu) is a single by Japanese singers Yōko Oginome and Masatoshi Ono. Written by Ono, the single was released on November 20, 1999, by Victor Entertainment.

== Track listing ==
All songs are written by Masatoshi Ono; all music is arranged by Takehiro Kawabe.

No.	Title	Length
1.	"Feeling"
2.	"Forever"
3.	"Feeling (Original Karaoke)"
