= Make It on My Own =

1992 single by Alison Limerick

Single by Alison Limerick

from the album And Still I Rise
- Released: 17 February 1992
- Genre: R&B; dance-pop; disco; house; soul
- Length: 4:54; 3:43 (Dancing Divaz radio mix)
- Label: BMG
- Songwriters: Alison Limerick; Steve Anderson
- Producer: Steve Anderson

Alison Limerick singles chronology
"Where Love Lives" (1990)	"Make It on My Own" (1992)	"Gettin' It Right" (1992)

Music videos
- "Make It on My Own" on YouTube
- "Make It on My Own" (Dancing Divaz Remix) on YouTube

"Make It on My Own" is a song by British singer-songwriter and former dancer Alison Limerick, released in February 1992 by BMG Records as the second single from her debut solo album, And Still I Rise (1992). The song is co-written by Limerick with its producer, Steve Anderson. It became a hit in the clubs and reached number 16 in the United Kingdom. On the Eurochart Hot 100, it reached number 64, while in the United States, it peaked at number six on the Billboard Hot Dance Club Play chart. In 1996, the song was remixed by house music producers Dancing Divaz and this version peaked at number 30 in the UK.

== Critical reception ==
Larry Flick from Billboard magazine wrote, "After a healthy run on import, British lass is poised to duplicate the success of her now-classic hit 'Where Love Lives'. String-lined remixes give the R&B/house tune a light and airy vibe. And how 'bout those vocals! They evoke images of a young Dionne Warwick. Brilliant." Pan-European magazine Music & Media noted, "The recipe for good '70s soul used by the likes of Gloria Gaynor and Sister Sledge proves to work as well in our time, the main differences being more beats per minute and less bass." Andy Beevers from Music Week stated that Limerick "returns to what she does best. This is an extremely catchy soulful song with dancefloor friendly mixes courtesy of Steve Anderson and Tony Humphries." James Hamilton from the Record Mirror Dance Update deemed it "incredibly catchy attractive yet forceful".

Upon the release of the 1996 Dancing Divaz remix, Kevin Courtney from Irish Times wrote, "The lady named after The Cranberries' home town continues her club crusade with this funky loungy anthem of independence and self sufficiency. Very encouraging to know that a girl can get along with just her handbag and a handful of beats." A reviewer from Music Week gave it a score of four out of five, commenting, "Despite her breathtaking voice, soul diva status has eluded Limerick, but the reworked anthem sounds fresh and should succeed." Also Daisy & Havoc from the Record Mirror Dance Update gave the new remix four out of five.

== Music video ==
A music video was produced to promote the single, featuring Limerick performing with musicians in a dance restaurant after closing time. It was later made available by Vevo on YouTube in 2012. The 1996 Dancing Divaz version was made available the same year.

== Track listings ==
UK and Europe, CD single (1992)
No.	Title	Length
1.	"Make It on My Own" (7-inch version)	4:54
2.	"Make It on My Own" (Spagotone mix)	8:27
3.	"Make It on My Own" (T-Scat mix)	7:04
4.	"Make It on My Own" (12-inch club)	7:08
5.	"Make It on My Own" (Flying Rulebook mix)	5:48

UK, CD single (1996)
No.	Title	Length
1.	"Make It on My Own" (Dancing Divaz radio mix)	3:43
2.	"Make It on My Own" (original 7-inch mix)	4:52
3.	"Make It on My Own" (Dancing Divaz club mix)	7:29
4.	"Make It on My Own" (Spagotone mix)	8:27
5.	"Make It on My Own" (Blue Boy 12-inch vocal)	6:30
6.	"Make It on My Own" (Dancing Divaz Rhythm mix)	5:44

== Charts ==
=== Weekly charts ===
Chart (1992)	Peak position
Australia (ARIA)	179
Europe (Eurochart Hot 100)	64
Europe (European Dance Radio)	6
Israel (Israeli Singles Chart)	29
UK Singles (Official Charts)	16
UK Airplay (Music Week)	9
UK Dance (Music Week)	11
UK Club Chart (Music Week)	3
US Hot Dance Club Play (Billboard)	6

Chart (1996)	Peak position
Europe (Eurochart Hot 100)	84
Scotland (OCC)	33
UK Singles (Official Charts)	30
UK Dance (OCC)	13
UK Club Chart (Music Week)	7
UK Pop Tip Club Chart (Music Week)	12

=== Year-end charts ===
Chart (1992)	Position
UK Club Chart (Music Week)	35

== Yōko Oginome version ==
"Make It on My Own"

Single by Yōko Oginome

from the album Chains
- Language: Japanese; English
- Released: August 21, 1997
- Recorded: 1997
- Genre: J-pop; dance-pop
- Length: 5:04
- Label: Victor
- Songwriters: Shūya Okino; Steve Anderson; Junior Giscombe; Alan Glass; Alison Limerick; Robbie Taylor
- Producer: Shinichi Osawa

Yōko Oginome singles chronology
"Look Up to the Sky" (1997)	"Make It on My Own" (1997)	"From My Garden" (1997)

"Make It on My Own" was covered by former pop idol, actress and voice actress Yōko Oginome as her 37th single and first maxi-single, released on 21 August 1997 by Victor Entertainment. Produced by Shinichi Osawa of Mondo Grosso, the single and album extended mix were recorded in Japanese while the English version was recorded as the "Original Mix" and other remixes.

=== Track listing ===
All songs are composed by Steve Anderson, Junior Giscombe, Alan Glass, Alison Limerick, and Robbie Taylor, except where indicated; all music is arranged by Shinichi Osawa.

CD single
No.	Title	Lyrics	Length
1.	"Make It on My Own"	Shūya Okino; Anderson; Giscombe; Glass; Limerick; Taylor	5:04
2.	"Make It on My Own" (Original Mix)		6:30
3.	"Make It on My Own" (The Room Classics Mix)		7:22
4.	"Make It on My Own" (Instrumental)		7:00

12" Limited Club Mixes
No.	Title	Length
1.	"Make It on My Own" (Original Club Mix)
2.	"Make It on My Own" (The Room Classics Mix)
3.	"Make It on My Own" (Murphy's Club Mix)
4.	"Make It on My Own" (Instrumental)
