= Verge of Love (song) =

1989 single by Yōko Oginome

Single by Yōko Oginome

from the album Verge of Love (Japanese Version)
- Language: Japanese
- B-side: "Swoopin' In"
- Released: January 18, 1989
- Recorded: 1988
- Studio: Tarpan Studios, San Rafael, California
- Genre: J-pop; R&B
- Length: 5:16
- Label: Victor
- Songwriters: Shintarō Hirai; Narada Michael Walden; Joyce Imbesi; Carolyn Hedrich
- Producer: Narada Michael Walden

Yōko Oginome singles chronology
"Dear (Cobalt no Kanata e)" (1988)	"Verge of Love" (1989)	"Shōnan Heartbreak" (1989)

Music video
- "Verge of Love" on YouTube

"Verge of Love" (ヴァージ・オブ・ラヴ, Vāji obu Ravu) is the 17th single by Japanese singer Yōko Oginome. Written by Narada Michael Walden, Joyce Imbesi, and Carolyn Hedrich, with Japanese lyrics by Shintarō Hirai, the single was released on January 18, 1989, by Victor Entertainment. It was Oginome's first and only single to be recorded and produced in the U.S.

== Background and release ==
The song is the Japanese translation of the title track from Oginome's 1988 all-English album Verge of Love. Both "Verge of Love" and the B-side "Swoopin' In" were used as theme songs of the Fuji TV drama special Komarenai de! (こまらせないで!; Don't Let Me Down!), which also starred Oginome.

"Verge of Love" peaked at No. 5 on Oricon's singles chart. It also sold over 81,000 copies.

== Track listing ==
All music is arranged by Narada Michael Walden.

1989 single
No.	Title	Lyrics	Music	Length
1.	"Verge of Love" (Vāji obu Ravu (ヴァージ・オブ・ラヴ))	Shintarō Hirai	Walden; Joyce Imbesi; Carolyn Hedrich	5:16
2.	"Swoopin' In" (Suūpin In (スゥーピン・イン)))	Masao Urino	Walden; Jeffrey Cohen	5:20

2013 bonus tracks
No.	Title	Length
3.	"Verge of Love (Original Karaoke)" ((ヴァージ・オブ・ラヴ (オリジナル・カラオケ)))
4.	"Swoopin' In (Original Karaoke)" ((スゥーピン・イン (オリジナル・カラオケ)))

== Charts ==
Chart (1989)	Peak position
Oricon Weekly Singles Chart	5
The Best Ten	7

== See also ==
- 1989 in Japanese music
