= Koi no Hallelujah =

1994 single by Yōko Oginome

Single by Yōko Oginome

from the album History
- Language: Japanese
- English title: Love Hallelujah
- B-side: "Sha-La-La"
- Released: November 23, 1994
- Recorded: 1994
- Genre: J-pop; dance-pop
- Label: Victor
- Songwriters: Rei Nakanishi; Kunihiko Suzuki

Yōko Oginome singles chronology
"Kyō kara Hajime yō" (1994)	"Koi no Hallelujah" (1994)	"Shiawase e no Jikan" (1995)

Music video
- "Koi no Hallelujah" on YouTube

"Koi no Hallelujah" (恋のハレルヤ, Koi no Hareruya; lit. "Love Hallelujah") is the 33rd single by Japanese singer Yōko Oginome. Written by Rei Nakanishi and Kunihiko Suzuki, the single was released on November 23, 1994, by Victor Entertainment.

== Background and release ==
Nakanishi wrote "Koi no Hallelujah" based on his experience as a refugee from Manchukuo during World War II. The original 1967 recording by Jun Mayuzumi sold over a million copies.

"Koi no Hallelujah" peaked at No. 76 on Oricon's singles chart and sold over 4,000 copies.

== Track listing ==
No.	Title	Lyrics	Music	Arrangement	Length
1.	"Koi no Hallelujah" (Koi no Hareruya (恋のハレルヤ; "Love Hallelujah"))	Rei Nakanishi	Kunihiko Suzuki	Fumio Okui
2.	"Sha-La-La"	Yōko Oginome	Yūko Ishikawa	Rod Antoon
3.	"Koi no Hallelujah" (Original Karaoke)
4.	"Sha-La-La" (Original Karaoke)

== Charts ==
Chart (1994)	Peak position
Oricon Weekly Singles Chart	76
