= Kyō kara Hajime yō =

1994 single by Yōko Oginome

Single by Yōko Oginome and Kazuhito Murata
- Language: Japanese
- English title: Let's Start Today
- Released: February 9, 1994
- Recorded: 1993
- Genre: J-pop
- Length: 5:51
- Label: Victor
- Songwriters: Yasushi Akimoto; Tsugutoshi Gotō

Yōko Oginome singles chronology
"Mystery in Love" (1993)	"Kyō kara Hajime yō" (1994)	"Koi no Hallelujah" (1994)

"Kyō kara Hajime yō" (今日から始めよう; lit. "Let's Start Today") is the 32nd single by Japanese singer Yōko Oginome, and it is a duet with Kazuhito Murata. Written by Yasushi Akimoto and Tsugutoshi Gotō, the single was released on February 9, 1994, by Victor Entertainment.

== Background and release ==
The duet was planned by Victor Entertainment to celebrate Valentine's Day and White Day. The song was used by Bourbon Corporation for their "Valentine's and White Day" commercials. The single features three different karaoke mixes for individual listeners to sing Oginome or Murata's vocals, or to sing it in its entirety.

"Yumemiru Planet" peaked at No. 50 on Oricon's singles chart and sold over 10,000 copies.

== Track listing ==
All lyrics are written by Yasushi Akimoto; all music is composed and arranged by Tsugutoshi Gotō.

No.	Title	Length
1.	"Kyō kara Hajime yō" ((今日から始めよう; "Let's Start Today"))	5:51
2.	"Kyō kara Hajime yō (Yōko Oginome with Karaoke)" (Kyō kara Hajime yō (Oginome Yōko Uta-iri Karaoke) (今日から始めよう(荻野目洋子歌入りカラオケ)))	5:18
3.	"Kyō kara Hajime yō (Kazuhito Murata with Karaoke)" (Kyō kara Hajime yō (Murata Kazuhito Uta-iri Karaoke) (今日から始めよう (村田和人歌入りカラオケ))))	5:18
4.	"Kyō kara Hajime yō (Original Karaoke)" ((今日から始めよう(オリジナル・カラオケ); "Let's Start Today (Original Karaoke)"))	5:51

== Charts ==
Chart (1994)	Peak position
Oricon Weekly Singles Chart	50
