= Bijo to Yajū =

1991 single by Yōko Oginome

Single by Yōko Oginome

from the album Trust Me
- Language: Japanese
- English title: Beauty and the Beast
- B-side: "I Know You"
- Released: June 5, 1991
- Recorded: 1991
- Genre: J-pop; dance-pop
- Label: Victor
- Songwriters: Masumi Kawamura; Toshinobu Kubota
- Producer: Ken Yoshida

Yōko Oginome singles chronology
"Shōnen no Hitomi ni..." (1990)	"Bijo to Yajū" (1991)	"Nee" (1991)

Music video
- "Bijo to Yajū" on YouTube

"Bijo to Yajū" (美女と野獣; lit. "Beauty and the Beast") is the 22nd single by Japanese singer Yōko Oginome. Written by Masumi Kawamura and Toshinobu Kubota, the single was released on June 5, 1991 by Victor Entertainment.

== Background and release ==
"Bijo to Yajū" peaked at No. 20 on Oricon's singles chart and sold over 31,000 copies.

== Track listing ==
No.	Title	Lyrics	Music	Arrangement	Length
1.	"Bijo to Yajū" ((美女と野獣; "Beauty and the Beast"))	Masumi Kawamura	Toshinobu Kubota	Yōichirō "Wacky" Kakizaki; Kōji "Kitaroh" Nakamura
2.	"I Know You"	Wakako Kaku	Kakizaki	Kakizaki
3.	"Bijo to Yajū (Original Karaoke)" ((美女と野獣(オリジナル・カラオケ); "Beauty and the Beast (Original Karaoke)"))
4.	"I Know You (Original Karaoke)" ((I KNOW YOU(オリジナル・カラオケ)))

== Charts ==
Chart (1991)	Peak position
Oricon Weekly Singles Chart	20
