= Dear (Cobalt no Kanata e) =

1988 single by Yōko Oginome

Single by Yōko Oginome

from the album CD-Rider
- Language: Japanese
- English title: Dear (Beyond Cobalt)
- B-side: "Asa no Machi"
- Released: July 21, 1988
- Recorded: 1988
- Genre: J-pop
- Length: 4:05
- Label: Victor
- Songwriters: Takafumi Sotoma; Ryō Asuka

Yōko Oginome singles chronology
"Stardust Dream" (1988)	"Dear (Cobalt no Kanata e)" (1988)	"Verge of Love" (1989)

Music video
- "Dear (Cobalt no Kanata e)" on YouTube

"Dear (Cobalt no Kanata e)" (DEAR〜コバルトの彼方へ〜, Diā ~Kobaruto no Kanata e~; lit. "Dear (Beyond Cobalt)") is the 16th single by Japanese singer Yōko Oginome. Written by Takafumi Sotoma and Ryō Asuka, the single was released on July 21, 1988, by Victor Entertainment.

== Background and release ==
The song was used as the theme song of the film Marilyn ni Aitai (マリリンに逢いたい, Maririn ni Aitai; I Want to Meet Marilyn).

"Dear (Cobalt no Kanata e)" peaked at No. 2 on Oricon's singles chart. It also sold over 136,000 copies.

== Track listing ==
All music is composed by Ryō Asuka; all music is arranged by Nobuyuki Shimizu.

1988 single
No.	Title	Lyrics	Length
1.	"Dear (Cobalt no Kanata e)" (Diā ~Kobaruto no Kanata e~ (DEAR〜コバルトの彼方へ〜; "Dear (Beyond Cobalt)"))	Takafumi Sotoma	4:05
2.	"Asa no Machi" ((朝の街; "Morning City"))	Asuka	3:55

2013 bonus tracks
No.	Title	Length
3.	"Dear (Cobalt no Kanata e) (Original Karaoke)" ((DEAR〜コバルトの彼方へ〜 (オリジナル・カラオケ); "Dear (Beyond Cobalt) (Original Karaoke)"))
4.	"Asa no Machi (Original Karaoke)" ((朝の街 (オリジナル・カラオケ); "Morning City (Original Karaoke)"))

== Charts ==
Weekly charts

Chart (1988)	Peak position
Oricon Weekly Singles Chart	2
The Best Ten	7

Year-end charts

Chart (1988)	Peak position
Oricon Year-End Chart	65
The Best Ten Year-End Chart	71

== See also ==
- 1988 in Japanese music
