= Stranger Tonight =

1988 single by Yōko Oginome

Single by Yōko Oginome

from the album CD-Rider
- Language: Japanese
- B-side: "Bus Stop"
- Released: January 21, 1988
- Recorded: 1987
- Genre: J-pop; dance-pop
- Length: 4:03
- Label: Victor
- Songwriters: Masao Urino; Nobody

Yōko Oginome singles chronology
"Kitakaze no Carol" (1987)	"Stranger Tonight" (1988)	"Stardust Dream" (1988)

Music video
- "Stranger Tonight" on YouTube

"Stranger Tonight" (ストレンジャーtonight, Sutorenjā Tunaito) is the 14th single by Japanese singer Yōko Oginome. Written by Masao Urino and Nobody, the single was released on January 21, 1988, by Victor Entertainment.

== Background and release ==
The song was used as the theme song of the TV Asahi drama special Madonna-sensei wa Rock'n Roller! (マドンナ先生はロックンローラー!; Professor Madonna Is a Rock'n Roller!), which also starred Oginome.

The music video features Oginome performing the song with a group of American dancers at a dance hall.

The B-side is a cover of The Hollies' hit single "Bus Stop".

"Stranger Tonight" became Oginome's second No. 1 single on Oricon's singles chart. It also sold over 143,000 copies. In addition, the single earned Oginome the Gold Award at the 30th Japan Record Awards and the Best Kayo Music Award at the 17th FNS Music Festival.

== Track listing ==
1988 single
No.	Title	Lyrics	Music	Arrangement	Length
1.	"Stranger Tonight" (Sutorenjā Tunaito (ストレンジャーtonight))	Masao Urino	Nobody	Ryō Yonemitsu	4:03
2.	"Bus Stop"	Graham Gouldman	Gouldman	Akira Nishihira	3:42

2013 bonus tracks
No.	Title	Length
3.	"Stranger Tonight (Original Karaoke)" (Sutorenjā Tunaito (Orijinaru Karaoke) (ストレンジャーtonight (オリジナル・カラオケ)))
4.	"Bus Stop (Original Karaoke)" ((BUS STOP (オリジナル・カラオケ)))

== Charts ==
Weekly charts

Chart (1988)	Peak position
Oricon Weekly Singles Chart	1
The Best Ten	2

Year-end charts

Chart (1988)	Peak position
Oricon Year-End Chart	60
The Best Ten Year-End Chart	64

== See also ==
- 1988 in Japanese music
