= Monday Michiru =

American singer-songwriter

- Also known as: Monday Michiru, Michiru Akiyoshi, Michiru Mariano
- Born: Michiru Monday Akiyoshi Mariano; August 19, 1963 (age 63)
- Origin: Tokyo, Japan
- Genres: Smooth jazz; acid jazz; soul; trip hop
- Occupation: Singer-songwriter
- Years active: 1990–present
- Labels: Mo' Wax, Grand Gallery, Pony Canyon, Universal Music, Sony Music Entertainment Japan, Quality Records, Geneon Universal Entertainment
- Website: Official website

Monday Michiru (マンデイ 満ちる, Mandei Michiru; born August 19, 1963) is a Japanese American singer and songwriter whose music encompasses and fuses a wide variety of genres including jazz, dance, pop, and soul. She is arguably best known for being a pioneer of the acid jazz movement in Japan in the early 1990s yet she has created her own unique style of music that transcends traditional definitions of the aforementioned genres.

Monday was born in Tokyo, Japan, to jazz pianist Toshiko Akiyoshi and her then husband, jazz saxophonist Charlie Mariano. At an early age, she expressed an interest in music; she studied modern dance and ballet from age eight, and the classical flute for eight years. It was not until high school that she discovered her true passion of singing.

In 1987, Monday appeared as a lead in the movie Hikaru Onna (Luminous Woman) in which she was credited as Michiru Akiyoshi. Monday's unintentional acting career took off as she won Best New Actress awards from Kinema Junpo, The Japan Academy, and the Yokohama Film Festival. With all this success, Monday became somewhat of a celebrity and could be seen on commercial ads and as a "personality" on several major television networks.

In 1991, she re-focused her interests and released her debut solo album Mangetsu. Although she continued her solo work, she became a featured singer/songwriter for many other groups and artists including Basement Jaxx (Always Be There), Mondo Grosso, DJ Krush, M-Flo and numerous others.

Since her debut, she has released numerous albums on an annual basis, including many compilations and remix projects, and numerous singles.

Monday now lives in New York City.

She is known in the music industry for releasing You Make Me as it was also released in Konami's beatmania and Dance Dance Revolution. It gained moderate airplay and has been a favorite easy listening song with its smooth jazz house music.
