= Shōnan Heartbreak =

1989 single by Yōko Oginome

Single by Yōko Oginome

from the album '91 Oginome Collection
- Language: Japanese
- B-side: "Koishikute"
- Released: June 7, 1989
- Recorded: 1989
- Genre: J-pop
- Length: 3:52
- Label: Victor
- Songwriters: Masao Urino; Yūji Ōtaguro

Yōko Oginome singles chronology
"Verge of Love" (1989)	"Shōnan Heartbreak" (1989)	"You're My Life" (1989)

Music video
- "Shōnan Heartbreak" on YouTube

"Shōnan Heartbreak" (湘南ハートブレイク, Shōnan Hātobureiku) is the 18th single by Japanese singer Yōko Oginome, released on June 7, 1989 by Victor Entertainment. Written by Masao Urino and Yūji Ōtaguro, it is a cover of Chika Takeuchi's 1988 single "No, No, No" with different lyrics.

== Background and release ==
Chika Takeuchi's "No, No, No", originally written by Reiko Yukawa and Yūji Ōtaguro, won the Japanese Grand Prix at the 18th World Popular Song Festival in 1987. The song was given new lyrics by Masao Urino as "Shōnan Heartbreak", which references the Sagami Bay region of Shōnan and is the lyrical sequel to Oginome's 1987 single "Wangan Taiyōzoku".

"Shōnan Heartbreak" peaked at No. 7 on Oricon's singles chart and sold over 72,000 copies. The song earned Oginome the 8th Pops Award at the Megalopolis Song Festival.

The song was performed with different lyrics on the TBS variety show Kato-chan Ken-chan Gokigen TV.

== Track listing ==
1989 single
No.	Title	Lyrics	Music	Arrangement	Length
1.	"Shōnan Heartbreak" (Shōnan Hātobureiku (湘南ハートブレイク))	Masao Urino	Yūji Ōtaguro	Tatsumi Yano	3:52
2.	"Koishikute" ((恋しくて; "I Miss You"))	Keiko Asō	Tetsuji Hayashi	Motoki Funayama	4:01

2013 bonus tracks
No.	Title	Length
3.	"Shōnan Heartbreak (Original Karaoke)" ((湘南ハートブレイク (オリジナル・カラオケ)))
4.	"Koishikute (Original Karaoke)" ((恋しくて (オリジナル・カラオケ); "I Miss You (Original Karaoke")))

== Charts ==
Chart (1989)	Peak position
Oricon Weekly Singles Chart	7

== See also ==
- 1989 in Japanese music
