= Gallery (Yōko Oginome song) =

1990 single by Yōko Oginome

Single by Yōko Oginome

from the album Knock on My Door
- Language: Japanese
- B-side: "On Bed"
- Released: June 27, 1990
- Recorded: 1990
- Genre: J-pop
- Label: Victor
- Songwriter: Yōsui Inoue
- Producer: Ken Yoshida

Yōko Oginome singles chronology
"You're My Life" (1989)	"Gallery" (1990)	"Shōnen no Hitomi ni..." (1990)

"Gallery" (ギャラリー, Gyararī) is the 20th single by Japanese singer Yōko Oginome. Written by Yōsui Inoue, the single was released on June 27, 1990 by Victor Entertainment.

== Background and release ==
"Gallery" peaked at No. 15 on Oricon's singles chart and sold over 45,000 copies. The song earned Oginome the Best Talent Award at the 16th All Japan Kayo Music Festival. Oginome performed the song on the 41st Kōhaku Uta Gassen in 1990, making her fourth appearance on NHK's New Year's Eve special.

== Track listing ==
All lyrics are written by Yōsui Inoue; all music is arranged by Atsushi Onozawa.

No.	Title	Music	Length
1.	"Gallery" (Gyararī (ギャラリー))	Inoue
2.	"On Bed"	Natsumi Hirai
3.	"Gallery (Original Karaoke)" (Gyararī (Orijinaru Karaoke) (ギャラリー(オリジナル・カラオケ)))
4.	"On Bed (Original Karaoke)" (On Beddo (Orijinaru Karaoke) (ON BED(オリジナル・カラオケ)))

== Charts ==
Chart (1990)	Peak position
Oricon Weekly Singles Chart	15

== See also ==
- 1990 in Japanese music
