= Giovanna Joyce Imbesi =

American keyboard player (died 2019)

- Born: United States
- Occupation: Keyboardist
- Website: Giovanna Imbesi at MySpace

Giovanna Joyce Imbesi (died 2019) was an American pianist/keyboardist. She embarked on her first national tour with Yanni in 1987 to promote his album, Out of Silence, and performed during the "Yanni 1988 Concert Series" and "Reflections of Passion" concert tours. During this time she played alongside such musicians as John Tesh and Charlie Adams, and with various symphony orchestras such as the San Francisco Chamber Orchestra, the Dallas Symphony Orchestra, and the Minneapolis Symphony. During the following years, she worked with a number of performers including Patti LaBelle, Jeffrey Osborne, Sheila E., Toni Childs, Starship, Narada Michael Walden and Andy Summers with whom she toured internationally. Following another national road tour with saxophonist Dave Koz, she released her first album in 2006, Short Stories: Piano Music for Healing, Meditation and Relaxation.

In 1982, Giovanna Joyce founded Kimball's Jazz Club in San Francisco with Joe Henderson and Joanne Brackeen as the first performance. Jazz artists performing at Kimball's featured Stan Getz, Charlie Haden, McCoy Tyner, Earl Fatha Hines, Denny Zeitlin, Pete Escovedo and many other legendary jazz musicians. Imbesi recounts "I was playing piano during dinner and at 8pm everyone left for the opera or symphony. I suggested to owner Kimball Allen that we have some jazz and he said OK. That's how Kimball's Jazz began, and I was booking the artists and essentially running the marketing, sound and graphics."

== See also ==
A Thousand Summers
