= Stardust Dream =

1988 single by Yōko Oginome

Single by Yōko Oginome

from the album CD-Rider
- Language: Japanese
- B-side: "Jungle Dance"
- Released: April 27, 1988
- Recorded: 1987
- Genre: J-pop; dance-pop
- Length: 4:03
- Label: Victor
- Songwriters: Reiji Asō; Yoshimasa Inoue

Yōko Oginome singles chronology
"Stranger Tonight" (1988)	"Stardust Dream" (1988)	"Dear (Cobalt no Kanata e)" (1988)

Music video
- "Stardust Dream" on YouTube

"Stardust Dream" (スターダスト・ドリーム, Sutādasuto Dorīmu) is the 15th single by Japanese singer Yōko Oginome. Written by Masao Urino (under the pseudonym "Reiji Asō") and Yoshimasa Inoue, the single was released on April 27, 1988, by Victor Entertainment.

== Background and release ==
"Stardust Dream" became Oginome's third and final No. 1 single on Oricon's singles chart. It also sold over 136,000 copies.

The B-side, "Jungle Dance", was featured in the February 1988 edition of NHK's Minna no Uta.

== Track listing ==
1988 single
No.	Title	Lyrics	Music	Arrangement	Length
1.	"Stardust Dream" (Sutādasuto Dorīmu (スターダスト・ドリーム))	Reiji Asō	Yoshimasa Inoue	Hiroshi Shinkawa	3:30
2.	"Jungle Dance" (Janguru Dansu (ジャングル・ダンス))	Yukinojo Mori	Tetsuya Komuro	Ryō Yonemitsu	3:44

2013 bonus tracks
No.	Title	Length
3.	"Stardust Dream (Original Karaoke)" (Sutādasuto Dorīmu (Orijinaru Karaoke) (スターダスト・ドリーム (オリジナル・カラオケ)))
4.	"Jungle Dance (Original Karaoke)" (Janguru Dansu (Orijinaru Karaoke) (ジャングル・ダンス (オリジナル・カラオケ)))

== Charts ==
Weekly charts

Chart (1988)	Peak position
Oricon Weekly Singles Chart	1
The Best Ten	7

Year-end charts

Chart (1988)	Peak position
Oricon Year-End Chart	64
The Best Ten Year-End Chart	76

== See also ==
- 1988 in Japanese music
