= You're My Life =

1989 single by Yōko Oginome

Single by Yōko Oginome

from the album Fair Tension
- Language: Japanese
- B-side: "Pink Sapphire"
- Released: September 27, 1989
- Recorded: 1989
- Genre: J-pop
- Label: Victor
- Songwriters: James Christian; Masao Urino
- Producer: Panta

Yōko Oginome singles chronology
"Shōnan Heartbreak" (1989)	"You're My Life" (1989)	"Gallery" (1990)

Music video
- "You're My Life" on YouTube

"You're My Life" (ユア・マイ・ライフ, Yua Mai Raifu) is the 19th single by Japanese singer Yōko Oginome, released on September 27, 1989 by Victor Entertainment. It is a Japanese-language cover of the song of the same title by James Christian, with lyrics by Masao Urino.

== Background and release ==
Prior to Oginome's version, "You're My Life" was first covered by Miyoko Yoshimoto in her 1987 album Yesterday's. Oginome's version peaked at No. 10 on Oricon's singles chart, becoming her last top-10 hit in her career. It also sold over 59,000 copies. The song earned Oginome the Gold Award at the 31st Japan Record Awards, the Best Hit Song Award at the 1989 FNS Music Festival, the Excellence Award at the 15th NTV Music Festival, and the Best Talent Award at the 15th All Japan Kayo Music Festival. Oginome performed the song on the 40th Kōhaku Uta Gassen in 1989, making her third appearance on NHK's New Year's Eve special.

The song was also used as the theme song of the TBS drama special Designer Monogatari ~Yume Oikakete Pari e~ (デザイナー物語〜夢追いかけてパリへ〜; Designer Story ~Chasing a Dream in Paris~), which also starred Oginome.

== Track listing ==
1989 single
No.	Title	Lyrics	Music	Arrangement	Length
1.	"You're My Life" (Yua Mai Raifu (ユア・マイ・ライフ))	Masao Urino; James Christian	Christian	Tatsumi Yano
2.	"Pink Sapphire" (Pinku Safaia (ピンク・サファイア))	Yoshiko Miura	Keiju Ishikawa	Yano

2013 re-release
No.	Title	Lyrics	Music	Arrangement	Length
1.	"You're My Life" (Yua Mai Raifu (ユア・マイ・ライフ))	Urino; Christian	Christian	Yano
2.	"You're My Life (Original Karaoke)" (Yua Mai Raifu (Orijinaru Karaoke) (ユア・マイ・ライフ (オリジナル・カラオケ)))
3.	"Pink Sapphire" (Pinku Safaia (ピンク・サファイア))	Miura	Ishikawa	Yano
4.	"Pink Sapphire (Original Karaoke)" (Pinku Safaia (Orijinaru Karaoke) (ピンク・サファイア (オリジナル・カラオケ)))

== Charts ==
Chart (1989)	Peak position
Oricon Weekly Singles Chart	10

== See also ==
- 1989 in Japanese music
