= 30th Anniversary Live Dear Pop Singer =

30th Anniversary Live Dear Pop Singer.

Video by Yōko Oginome
- Released: March 25, 2015
- Recorded: October 16, 2014
- Venue: Akasaka Blitz
- Genres: J-pop; dance-pop; kayōkyoku; pop rock
- Length: 130 minutes
- Languages: Japanese; English
- Label: Victor

Yōko Oginome chronology
Pop Liberation Force (1993)	30th Anniversary Live Dear Pop Singer. (2015)

30th Anniversary Live Dear Pop Singer. (30th Anniversary LIVEディア・ポップシンガー) is a live video album by Japanese singer/songwriter Yōko Oginome, released on March 25, 2015, through Victor Entertainment on Blu-ray + DVD. The video covers Oginome's concert at Akasaka Blitz on October 16, 2014, during the Dear Pop Singer tour as part of her 30th anniversary celebration.

The album peaked at No. 92 on Oricon's Blu-ray chart.

== Track listing ==
Blu-ray/DVD
No.	Title	Writer(s)	Length
1.	"Opening / 99 Big Balloons"	Carlo Karges; Uwe Fahrenkrog-Petersen
2.	"Lovin' You Baby" (Ravin Yū Beibī (ラヴィン・ユー・ベイビー))	Paul Stanley; Vini Poncia; Desmond Child
3.	"MC-01"
4.	"Hot Stuff ~Koi no Kakehiki~" (Hotto Sutaffu ~Koi no Kakehiki~ (ホット・スタッフ ～恋のかけひき～; "Hot Stuff ~Love Call~"))	Pete Bellotte; Harold Faltermeyer; Keith Forsey
5.	"Breakout ~Hikero, Watashi~" (Bureikuauto ~Hikero, Watashi~ (ブレイクアウト ～弾けろ、ワタシ～; "Breakout ~Play with Me~"))	Andy Connell; Corinne Drewery; Martin Jackson
6.	"MC-02"
7.	"Mirai Kōkai (Sailing)" ((未来航海-Sailing-; "Future Voyage -Sailing-"))	Hiromi Kanda; Yukiyoshi Shimazu
8.	"Sayonara kara Hajimaru Monogatari" ((さよならから始まる物語; "A Story That Begins with a Goodbye"))	Chinfa Kan; Tetsuya Furumoto
9.	"December Memory" (Disenbā Memorī (ディセンバー・メモリー))	Yoshiko Miura; Daisuke Inoue
10.	"Mukokuseki Romance" (Mukokuseki Romansu (無国籍ロマンス; "A Romance Without Nationality"))	Fumiko Okada; Ryuichi Sakamoto
11.	"Koishite Caribbean" (Koishite Karibian (恋してカリビアン; "Love in the Caribbean"))	Gorō Matsui; Hideya Nakazaki
12.	"Kokoro no Mama ni (I'm Just a Lady)" ((心のままに 〜I'm just a lady〜; "As You Please ~I'm Just a Lady~"))	Mai Arai
13.	"MC-03"
14.	"Bus Stop"	Graham Gouldman
15.	"Slope ni Tenki Ame" (Surōpu ni Tenki Ame (スロープに天気雨; "Rainy Weather on the Slope"))	Keiko Asō; Masayoshi Takanaka
16.	"Instrumental"
17.	"Steal Your Love"	Reo Mikami; Satoshi Hirose
18.	"Bijo to Yajū" ((美女と野獣; "Beauty and the Beast"))	Masumi Kawamura; Toshinobu Kubota
19.	"Coffee Rumba" (Kōhī Runba (コーヒー・ルンバ))	José Manzo Perroni; Seiji Nakazawa
20.	"MC-04"
21.	"Sayonara no Kajitsutachi" ((さよならの果実たち; "Goodbye Fruits"))	Masao Urino; Kyōhei Tsutsumi
22.	"Stranger Tonight" (Sutorenjā Tunaito (ストレンジャーtonight))	Urino; Nobody
23.	"Stardust Dream" (Sutādasuto Dorīmu (スターダスト・ドリーム))	Reiji Asō; Yoshimasa Inoue
24.	"Flamingo in Paradise" (Furamingo in Paradaisu (フラミンゴ in パラダイス))	Urino; Nobody
25.	"Shōnan Heartbreak" (Shōnan Hātobureiku (湘南ハートブレイク))	Urino; Yūji Ōtaguro
26.	"Kitakaze no Carol" (Kitakaze no Kyaroru (北風のキャロル; "North Wind Carol"))
27.	"Dance Beat wa Yoake made" (Dansu Bīto wa Yoake made (Dance Beatは夜明けまで; "Dance Beat Until Dawn"))	Hiromi Mori; Nobody
28.	"MC-05 / Isezakicho Blues" (Isezakichō Burūsu (伊勢佐木町ブルース))	Kōhan Kawauchi; Yōichi Suzuki
29.	"Machikirenai Hitomi" ((待ちきれない瞳; "Eyes I Can't Wait For"))	Natsumi Tadano; Yoshimitsu Ōba
30.	"Freedom" (Furīdamu (フリーダム))	George Michael
31.	"Kimi to Time Machine" (Kimi to Taimu Mashin (キミとタイムマシン; "You and the Time Machine"))	Yōko Oginome; Hidehito Ikumo; Valerie Stern
32.	"MC-06"
33.	"Mayonaka no Stranger" (Mayonaka no Sutorenjā (真夜中のストレンジャー; "Midnight Stranger"))	Reiko Yukawa; Nobody
34.	"Wangan Taiyōzoku" ((湾岸太陽族; "Bayshore Route Sun Tribe"))	Urino; Minoru Yamazaki
35.	"Roppongi Junjōha" ((六本木純情派; "Roppongi Pure-Heart Clique"))	Urino; Akihiro Yoshimi
36.	"MC-07"
37.	"Dancing Hero (Eat You Up)" (Danshingu Hīrō (Īto Yū Appu) (ダンシング・ヒーロー (Eat You Up)))	Hitoshi Shinohara; Angelina Kyte; Anthony Baker
38.	"Itsumademo Don't Let Me Down" ((いつまでもDON’T LET ME DOWN; "Don't Let Me Down Forever"))	Mikami; Hirose
39.	"MC-08"
40.	"Natsu no Stage Light / Ending" (Natsu no Sutēji Raito (夏のステージ・ライト; "Summer Stage Lights"))	Yukawa; Yoshiyuki Ohsawa
Total length:			130 minutes

Bonus content
No.	Title	Length
1.	"Personnel Interview + Concert Day Documentary" ((本人インタビュー＋コンサート当日のドキュメンタリーを追加収録))
Total length:		21 minutes

== Charts ==
Chart (2015)	Peak position
Japanese Blu-ray Sales (Oricon)	92
