= The Best (Yōko Oginome album) =

Yōko Oginome: The Best

Greatest hits album by Yōko Oginome
- Released: December 25, 1985
- Recorded: 1984–1985
- Genre: J-pop; kayōkyoku; teen pop; dance-pop
- Length: 60:29 (CD)
- Language: Japanese
- Label: Victor

Yōko Oginome chronology
Kaigara Terrace (1985)	Yōko Oginome: The Best (1985)	Raspberry Wind (1986)

Singles from Yōko Oginome: The Best
- 1. "December Memory" Released: November 5, 1984; 2. "Dancing Hero (Eat You Up)" Released: November 21, 1985

Yōko Oginome: The Best (荻野目洋子 ザ・ベスト, Oginome Yōko Za Besuto) is the first greatest hits album by Japanese singer Yōko Oginome. Released through Victor Entertainment on December 25, 1985, the album compiles Oginome's singles from 1984 to 1985, including her hit single "Dancing Hero (Eat You Up)". The LP's track listing differs from that of the CD and cassette versions.

The album peaked at No. 15 on Oricon's albums chart and sold over 106,000 copies.

== Track listing ==
CD/Cassette

No.	Title	Lyrics	Music	Arrangement	Length
1.	"Mirai Kōkai (Sailing)" (Mirai Kōkai -Seiringu- (未来航海-Sailing-; "Future Voyage (Sailing)"))	Hiromi Kanda	Yukiyoshi Shimazu	Mitsuo Hagita	3:17
2.	"Ryūsei Shōjo" ((流星少女; "Meteor Girl"))	Yoko Aki	Yūichirō Oda	Hagita	4:08
3.	"Sayonara kara Hajimaru Monogatari" ((さよならから始まる物語; "A Story That Begins with a Goodbye"))	Chinfa Kan	Tetsuya Furumoto	Hagita	3:18
4.	"Natsu no Hohoemi" ((夏の微笑; "Summer Smile"))	Yoshiko Miura	Yayoi Tanaka	Makoto Matsushita	5:01
5.	"Teens Romance" (Tīnzu Romansu (ティーンズ・ロマンス))	Kanda	Akari Misuzawa	Kazuo Ōtani	3:36
6.	"December Memory" (Disenbā Memorī (ディセンバー・メモリー))	Miura	Daisuke Inoue	Motoki Funayama	4:20
7.	"Ame to Jasmine" (Ame to Jasumin (雨とジャスミン; "Rain and Jasmine"))	Miura	Inoue	Funayama	3:42
8.	"Mukokuseki Romance" (Mukokuseki Romansu (無国籍ロマンス; "A Romance Without Nationality"))	Fumiko Okada	Ryuichi Sakamoto	Jun Irie	3:20
9.	"Freesia no Ame" (Furījia no Ame (フリージアの雨; "Freesia Rain"))	Takashi Matsumoto	Funayama	Funayama	3:39
10.	"2B no Enpitsu" (Ni Bī no Enpitsu (2Bの鉛筆; "2B Pencil"))	Matsumoto	Funayama	Funayama	4:09
11.	"Koishite Caribbean" (Koishite Karibian (恋してカリビアン; "Love in the Caribbean"))	Gorō Matsui	Hideya Nakazaki	Nakazaki	3:53
12.	"Ai no Time Capsule" (Ai no Taimu Kapuseru (愛のタイムカプセル; "Love Time Capsule"))	Yasushi Akimoto	Funayama	Funayama	2:57
13.	"Kokoro no Mama ni (I'm Just a Lady)" ((心のままに 〜I'm just a lady〜; "As You Please ~I'm Just a Lady~"))	Mai Arai	Arai	Hagita	4:22
14.	"Sweet Vacation" (Suīto Vakēshon (スイート・ヴァケーション))	Akimoto	Nakazaki	Nakazaki	3:19
15.	"Kaigara Terrace" (Kaigara Terasu (貝殻テラス; "Seashell Terrace"))	Akimoto	Funayama	Funayama	3:39
16.	"Dancing Hero (Eat You Up)" (Danshingu Hīrō (Īto Yū Appu) (ダンシング・ヒーロー (Eat You Up)))	Hitoshi Shinohara	Angeline Kyte; Anthony Baker	Kōji Makaino	3:49

LP

Side A
No.	Title	Lyrics	Music	Arrangement	Length
1.	"Mirai Kōkai (Sailing)" (Mirai Kōkai -Seiringu- (未来航海-Sailing-; "Future Voyage (Sailing)"))	Kanda	Shimazu	Hagita	3:17
2.	"Ryūsei Shōjo" ((流星少女; "Meteor Girl"))	Aki	Oda	Hagita	4:08
3.	"Sayonara kara Hajimaru Monogatari" ((さよならから始まる物語; "A Story That Begins with a Goodbye"))	Kan	Furumoto	Hagita	3:18
4.	"Natsu no Hohoemi" ((夏の微笑; "Summer Smile"))	Miura	Tanaka	Matsushita	5:01
5.	"December Memory" (Disenbā Memorī (ディセンバー・メモリー))	Miura	Inoue	Funayama	4:20
6.	"Mukokuseki Romance" (Mukokuseki Romansu (無国籍ロマンス; "A Romance Without Nationality"))	Okada	Sakamoto	Irie	3:20

Side B
No.	Title	Lyrics	Music	Arrangement	Length
1.	"Koishite Caribbean" (Koishite Karibian (恋してカリビアン; "Love in the Caribbean"))	Matsui	Nakazaki	Nakazaki	3:53
2.	"Ai no Time Capsule" (Ai no Taimu Kapuseru (愛のタイムカプセル; "Love Time Capsule"))	Akimoto	Funayama	Funayama	2:57
3.	"Kokoro no Mama ni ~I'm Just a Lady~" ((心のままに 〜I'm just a lady〜; "As You Please ~I'm Just a Lady~"))	Arai	Arai	Funayama	4:22
4.	"Sweet Vacation" (Suīto Vakēshon (スイート・ヴァケーション))	Akimoto	Funayama	Funayama	3:19
5.	"Dancing Hero (Eat You Up)" (Danshingu Hīrō (Īto Yū Appu) (ダンシング・ヒーロー (Eat You Up)))	Shinohara	Kyte; Baker	Makaino	3:49
6.	"Zenmaijikake no Suiyōbi" ((ぜんまいじかけの水曜日; "Mainspring Wednesday"))	Akimoto	Kazuhiko Matsuo	Hagita	4:10

== Charts ==
Chart (1985)	Peak position
Japanese Albums (Oricon)	15

== See also ==
- 1985 in Japanese music
