= Best Hits Non Stop Clubmix =

Remix album by Yōko Oginome
- Released: December 16, 1992
- Recorded: 1991–1992
- Genres: J-pop; dance-pop
- Length: 53:35
- Language: Japanese
- Label: Victor

Yōko Oginome chronology
Nudist (1992)	Best Hits Non Stop Clubmix (1992)	De-Luxe (1993)

Best Hits Non Stop Clubmix is a remix album by Japanese singer Yōko Oginome. Released through Victor Entertainment on December 16, 1992, the album features remixes of songs mainly from Oginome's 1992 album Ryūkō Kashu.

The album peaked at No. 51 on Oricon's albums chart and sold over 15,000 copies.

== Track listing ==
All tracks are arranged by Yukio Sugai, Kōichi Kaminaga, and Ryujin Inoue, except where indicated.

No.	Title	Lyrics	Music	Arrangement	Length
1.	"This Is Pop"	Reo Mikami	Warren Bacall		6:43
2.	"Nee" (Nē (ねえ; "Hey"))	Mikami	Tadashi Ishikawa		8:52
3.	"Bijo to Yajū" ((美女と野獣; "Beauty and the Beast"))	Masumi Kawamura	Toshinobu Kubota	Yōichirō Kakizaki; Kōji Nakamura	6:06
4.	"Anata ni Kaeritai" ((あなたに帰りたい; "I Want to Go Back to You"))	Miyuki Asano	Inoue		6:26
5.	"Coffee Rumba" (Kōhī Runba (コーヒー・ルンバ))	Seiji Nakazawa	José Manzo Perroni		7:25
6.	"Dancing Hero (Eat You Up)" (Danshingu Hīrō (Īto Yū Appu) (ダンシング・ヒーロー (Eat You Up)))	Hitoshi Shinohara	Angeline Kyte; Anthony Baker	Kōji Makaino	5:50
7.	"Moonlight Blue"	Asano	Dennis Belfield; Joey Carbone		5:29
8.	"Steal Your Love"	Mikami	Satoshi Hirose		6:41
Total length:					53:35

== Charts ==
Chart (1992)	Peak position
Japanese Albums (Oricon)	51
