= Pop Groover: The Best =

Greatest hits album by Yōko Oginome
- Released: December 19, 1987
- Recorded: 1985–1987
- Genres: J-pop; kayōkyoku; dance-pop; teen pop
- Length: 58:11 (CD)
- Languages: Japanese; English
- Label: Victor

Yōko Oginome chronology
Route 246 Connexion (1987)	Pop Groover: The Best (1987)	CD-Rider (1988)

Singles from Pop Groover: The Best
- 1. "Kitakaze no Carol" Released: October 27, 1987

Pop Groover: The Best (ポップ・グルーヴァー・ザ・ベスト, Poppu Gurūvā Za Besuto) is the second greatest hits album by Japanese singer Yōko Oginome. Released through Victor Entertainment on December 19, 1987, the album compiles Oginome's singles from 1985 to 1987, plus re-recordings of four songs from 1984 to 1985.

The album peaked at No. 3 on Oricon's albums chart and sold over 332,000 copies.

== Track listing ==
CD

No.	Title	Lyrics	Music	Arrangement	Length
1.	"Mirai Kōkai (Sailing) (New Version)" (Mirai Kōkai - Seiringu - (未来航海 - sailing -; "Future Voyage - Sailing -"))	Hiromi Kanda	Yukiyoshi Shimazu	Ryō Yonemitsu	3:16
2.	"Sayonara kara Hajimaru Monogatari (New Version)" ((さよならから始まる物語; "A Story That Begins with a Goodbye"))	Chinfa Kan	Tetsuya Furumoto	Yonemitsu	3:18
3.	"Koishite Caribbean (New Version)" (Koishite Karibian (恋してカリビアン; "Love in the Caribbean"))	Gorō Matsui	Hideya Nakazaki	Yonemitsu	3:54
4.	"Kokoro no Mama ni (I'm Just a Lady) (New Version)" ((心のままに 〜I'm just a lady〜; "As You Please ~I'm Just a Lady~"))	Mai Arai	Arai	Yonemitsu	4:20
5.	"Dancing Hero (Eat You Up) -Special English Version-" (Danshingu Hīrō (Īto Yū Appu) (ダンシング・ヒーロー (Eat You Up) -Special English Version-))	Marco Bruno	Angeline Kyte; Anthony Baker	Kōji Makaino	3:45
6.	"Flamingo in Paradise" (Furamingo in Paradaisu (フラミンゴ in パラダイス))	Masao Urino	Nobody	Motoki Funayama	3:55
7.	"Natsu no Stage Light" (Natsu no Sutēji Raito (夏のステージ・ライト; "Summer Stage Lights"))	Reiko Yukawa	Yoshiyuki Ohsawa	Funayama	4:33
8.	"Dance Beat wa Yoake made" (Dansu Bīto wa Yoake made (Dance Beatは夜明けまで; "Dance Beat Until Dawn"))	Hiromi Mori	Nobody	Akira Nishihira	3:38
9.	"Roppongi Junjōha" ((六本木純情派; "Roppongi Pure-Heart Clique"))	Urino	Akihiro Yoshimi	Hiroshi Shinkawa	3:27
10.	"Wangan Taiyōzoku" ((湾岸太陽族; "Bayshore Route Sun Tribe"))	Urino	Minoru Yamazaki	Nishihira	3:41
11.	"Sayonara no Kajitsutachi" ((さよならの果実たち; "Goodbye Fruits"))	Urino	Kyōhei Tsutsumi	Satoshi Takebe	3:49
12.	"Karuizawa Connexion" (Karuizawa Konekushon (軽井沢コネクション))	Urino	Tsutsumi	Shirō Sagisu	3:46
13.	"Kitakaze no Carol" (Kitakaze no Kyaroru (北風のキャロル; "North Wind Carol"))	Urino	Tsutsumi	Shinkawa	3:52
14.	"D2D"	Masumi Kawamura	Tsunehiro Izumi	Shinkawa	4:16
15.	"Nonstop Dancer"	Kawamura	Tetsuya Komuro	Shinkawa	4:35
Total length:					58:11

- Tracks 14–15 not included in the LP and cassette releases.

== Charts ==
Weekly charts

Chart (1987)	Peak position
Japanese Albums (Oricon)	3

Year-end charts

Chart (1988)	Peak position
Japanese Albums (Oricon)	24

== See also ==
- 1987 in Japanese music
