= Sonoko =

Sonoko (苑子, 園子) may refer to:

== People ==
- Sonoko Chiba (千葉 園子, born 1993), Japanese football player
- Sonoko Inoue (井上 苑子; born 1997), Japanese singer-songwriter and actress
- Sonoko Kato (加藤 園子, born 1976), Japanese professional wrestler
- Sonoko Kawai (河合 その子, born 1965), former Japanese singer
- Sonoko Machida (町田 そのこ; born 1980), Japanese novelist
- Sonoko Nakano (中野 園子, born 1952), Japanese figure skating coach
- Sonoko Sakai, Japanese American cooking teacher and food writer

== Music ==
- Sonoko (album), by Sonoko Kawai

== Fictional characters ==
- Sonoko Sakanoue, a character in the video game Yandere Simulator
- Sonoko Suzuki (鈴木 園子), a character from the Japanese manga Case Closed
- Nogi Sonoko, a character from Yuki Yuna is a Hero
- Sonoko, Belgian-Japanese singer on Crammed Discs
