= 1985 in Japanese music =

In 1985 (Shōwa 60), Japanese music was released on records, and there were charts, awards, contests and festivals.

During that year, Japan continued to have the second largest music market in the world.

== Awards, contests and festivals ==
The 14th Tokyo Music Festival was held on 31 March 1985. The 27th Osaka International Festival (Japanese: 大阪国際フェスティバル) was held from 8 to 24 April 1985. The 29th Yamaha Popular Song Contest was held on 12 May 1985. The 30th Yamaha Popular Song Contest was held on 29 September 1985. The final of the 16th World Popular Song Festival was held on 27 October 1985. The final of the 14th FNS Music Festival was held on 17 December 1985. The 27th Japan Record Awards were held on 31 December 1985. The 36th NHK Kōhaku Uta Gassen was held on 31 December 1985. The 1st Tokyo Summer Festival was held in 1985.

== Concerts ==
A Super Rock '85 concert was held.

== Number one singles ==
The following reached number 1 on the weekly Oricon Singles Chart:

Issue date	Song	Artist(s)
7 January	"The Stardust Memory"	Kyōko Koizumi
14 January	"The Stardust Memory"	Kyōko Koizumi
21 January	"You Gotta Chance: Dance de Natsu wo Dakishimete"	Kōji Kikkawa
28 January	"You Gotta Chance: Dance de Natsu wo Dakishimete"	Kōji Kikkawa
4 February	"You Gotta Chance: Dance de Natsu wo Dakishimete"	Kōji Kikkawa
11 February	"Tenshi no Wink"	Seiko Matsuda
18 February	"Tenshi no Wink"	Seiko Matsuda
25 February	"Yoisho!" (ヨイショッ!)	Masahiko Kondō
4 March	"Cinderella wa Nemurenai"	The Alfee
11 March	"Sotsugyō: Graduation"	Momoko Kikuchi
18 March	"Mi Amore (Meu amor é...)"	Akina Nakamori
25 March	"Mi Amore (Meu amor é...)"	Akina Nakamori
1 April	"Ano Ko to Scandal"	The Checkers
8 April	"Ano Ko to Scandal"	The Checkers
15 April	"Ano Ko to Scandal"	The Checkers
22 April	"Tokonatsu Musume"	Kyōko Koizumi
29 April	"Tokonatsu Musume"	Kyōko Koizumi
6 May	"Nikumare Sōna New Face"	Kōji Kikkawa
13 May	"Akaitori Nigeta"	Akina Nakamori
20 May	"Boy no Kisetsu"	Seiko Matsuda
27 May	"Boy no Theme"	Momoko Kikuchi
3 June	"Boy no Theme"	Momoko Kikuchi
10 June	"Ima Dakara"	Yumi Matsutoya, Kazumasa Oda, Kazuo Zaitsu
17 June	"Ima Dakara"	Yumi Matsutoya, Kazumasa Oda, Kazuo Zaitsu
24 June	"Debut / Manhattan Joke"	Naoko Kawai
1 July	"Sand Beige (Sabaku e)"	Akina Nakamori
8 July	"Dancing Shoes"	Seiko Matsuda
15 July	"Ore-tachi no Rockabilly Night"	The Checkers
22 July	"Ore-tachi no Rockabilly Night"	The Checkers
29 July	"Ore-tachi no Rockabilly Night"	The Checkers
5 August	"Majo"	Kyōko Koizumi
12 August	"Kanashimi ni Sayonara"	Anzen Chitai
19 August	"Kanashimi ni Sayonara"	Anzen Chitai
26 August	"Kareinaru Kake"	Toshihiko Tahara
2 September	"Kanashimi ni Sayonara"	Anzen Chitai
9 September	"Kanashimi ni Sayonara"	Anzen Chitai
16 September	"Namida no Jasmine Love"	Sonoko Kawai
23 September	"Namida no Jasmine Love"	Sonoko Kawai
30 September	"Heart of Rainbow: Ai no Niji wo Watatte / Blue Pacific"	The Checkers
7 October	"Mō Aenai Kamo Shirenai"	Momoko Kikuchi
14 October	"Mō Aenai Kamo Shirenai"	Momoko Kikuchi
21 October	"Solitude"	Akina Nakamori
28 October	"Koi ni Ochite: Fall in Love"	Akiko Kobayashi
4 November	"Koi ni Ochite: Fall in Love"	Akiko Kobayashi
11 November	"Kami-sama Help!"	The Checkers
18 November	"Koi ni Ochite: Fall in Love"	Akiko Kobayashi
25 November	"Koi ni Ochite: Fall in Love"	Akiko Kobayashi
2 December	"Nantettatte Idol"	Kyōko Koizumi
9 December	"Koi ni Ochite: Fall in Love"	Akiko Kobayashi
16 December	"Koi ni Ochite: Fall in Love"	Akiko Kobayashi
23 December	"Kamen Butōkai"	Shonentai
30 December	"Koi ni Ochite: Fall in Love"	Akiko Kobayashi

== Number one albums and LPs ==
Music Labo

The following reached number 1 on the Music Labo chart:

- 7 January, 14 January, 19 January, 28 January, 2 February, 11 February, 18 February and 25 February: 9.5 Carats - Yōsui Inoue
- 4 March and 11 March: Today's Girl - Kyoko Koizumi
- 18 March and 25 March: Seiko-Train - Seiko Matsuda
- 1 April: Kaikisen - Yutaka Ozaki
- 8 April: Innocent Sky - Kōji Kikkawa
- 15 April and 22 April: Bitter and Sweet - Akina Nakamori
- 29 April: Oiro Naoshi - Miyuki Nakajima
- 6 May and 13 May: Soundtrack of Tan Tan Tanuki
- 20 May, 27 May, 3 June and 10 June: We Are the World - USA for Africa
- 17 June, 24 June and 8 July: The 9th Wave - Seiko Matsuda
- 29 June: For Your Love - The Alfee
- 15 July, 22 July, 29 July and 5 August: Another Summer - S. Kiyotaka & Omega Tribe
- 12 August: Back Streets of Tokyo - Off Course
- 19 August: D404ME - Akina Nakamori
- 26 August: Sound of My Heart - Seiko Matsuda
- 2 September, 9 September and 16 September: Mainichi Checkers - The Checkers
- 23 September, 30 September, 7 October, 14 October, 21 October, 28 October, 4 November and 11 November: Kamakura - Southern All Stars
- 16 November: miss M. - Miyuki Nakajima
- 25 November and 2 December: Rebecca IV ~maybe tomorrow~ - Rebecca
- 9 December and 16 December: Da Di Da - Yumi Matsutoya
- 23 December: First Finale - S. Kiyotaka & Omega Tribe

Oricon

- Soundtrack of Tan Tan Tanuki
- Rebecca IV ~maybe tomorrow~ by Rebecca

== Annual charts ==
The Checkers' Julia Ni Heartbreak (Julia Ni Shoushin) was number 1 in the Oricon annual singles chart.

== Karaoke ==
Hitachi introduced new karaoke machines.

== Music industry ==
Fewer tapes and disks were produced in January 1985, than were produced in January 1984.

== Film and television ==
The music of Sorekara and Tomo Yo, Shizuka Ni Nemure, by Shigeru Umebayashi, won the 40th Mainichi Film Award for Best Music. The music of Shokutaku No Nai Ie, Fire Festival and Ran (1985), by Tōru Takemitsu won the 9th Japan Academy Film Prize for Best Music (awarded in 1986). The music of Night on the Galactic Railroad is by Haruomi Hosono, and includes the theme song by Kaori Nakahara (Japanese: 中原香織). The music of the first Sukeban Deka television series includes the song Shiroi Honō by Yuki Saito.

== Video ==
43% of LaserVision disk releases were music, and the most popular included "Off Course Budokan Concert".

== Composers and lyricists ==
The highest selling composers were Kyōhei Tsutsumi, Hiroaki Serizawa and Tetsuji Hayashi. The highest selling lyricists were Masao Urino and Takashi Matsumoto.

== Overseas ==
The album Thunder in the East by Loudness reached number 74 on the Billboard 200.

== Debuts ==
- Miho Morikawa

== Other singles released ==
- Mukokuseki Romance, Koishite Caribbean, Kokoro no Mama ni (I'm Just a Lady) and Dancing Hero (Eat You Up) by Yōko Oginome
- Blue Revolution by Mari Hamada
- Futari no Natsu Monogatari by S. Kiyotaka & Omega Tribe
- Plastic Love by Mariya Takeuchi
- Sotsugyō, Hatsukoi and Jōnetsu by Yuki Saito
- Sailor Fuku o Nugasanai de and Oyoshi ni Natte ne Teacher by Onyanko Club
- C, Namaiki and Be-Bop High School by Miho Nakayama
- 7 August: Mizu no Hoshi e Ai wo Komete by Hiroko Moriguchi

== Other albums released ==
- Freesia no Ame, Kaigara Terrace and The Best by Yōko Oginome
- Esperanto by Ryuichi Sakamoto
- Coincidental Music by Haruomi Hosono
- Rainbow Dream, Magical Mystery "Mari" and Blue Revolution by Mari Hamada
- Halle and Casiopea Live by Casiopea
- Karkador by P-Model
- Odin by Loudness
- R.E.S.O.R.T. by T-Square
- Sonoko by Sonoko Kawai
- Mizu no Hoshi e Ai wo Komete by Hiroko Moriguchi
- Axia by Yuki Saito
- Kick Off by Onyanko Club
- C and After School by Miho Nakayama
- Masquerade Show by Show-Ya
- Traumatic Kyokutotanteyidan by Masayoshi Takanaka

== Deaths ==
- 12 August: Kyu Sakamoto was killed in the crash of Japan Air Lines Flight 123

== See also ==
- Timeline of Japanese music
- 1985 in Japan
- 1985 in music
- w:ja:1985年の音楽
