= Nudist (album) =

Studio album by Yōko Oginome
- Released: November 21, 1992
- Recorded: 1992
- Genre: J-pop; pop rock; dance-pop
- Length: 45:52
- Language: Japanese
- Label: Victor
- Producer: Keisuke Tsukimitsu

Yōko Oginome chronology
Ryūkō Kashu (1992)	Nudist (1992)	Best Hits Non Stop Clubmix (1992)

Nudist (ヌーディスト, Nūdisuto) is the 14th studio album by Japanese singer/songwriter Yōko Oginome. Released through Victor Entertainment on November 21, 1992, the album was produced by Keisuke Tsukimitsu, who also produced Oginome's previous album Ryūkō Kashu. It was also Oginome's first studio album to not generate a single. The album was reissued on May 26, 2010, with five bonus tracks as part of Oginome's 25th anniversary celebration.

The album peaked at No. 27 on Oricon's albums chart and sold over 26,000 copies.

== Track listing ==
All tracks are arranged by Yukio Sugai, Kōichi Kaminaga, and Ryujin Inoue, except where indicated.

No.	Title	Lyrics	Music	Length
1.	"Replica no Kiss" (Repurika no Kissu (REPLICAのKISS))	Asako Umi	Tatsuhito Inoue	3:58
2.	"Last Dance wa Watashi ni" (Rasuto Dansu wa Watashi ni (ラストダンスは私に; "The Last Dance for Me"))	Takako Shirai	Kaori Okui	4:33
3.	"Itsumademo Don't Let Me Down" ((いつまでもDON’T LET ME DOWN; "Don't Let Me Down Forever"))	Reo Mikami	Satoshi Hirose	3:57
4.	"Nudist"	YOKO	Joey Carbone; Dennis Belfield	3:56
5.	"Joy Luck Club"	Miyuki Asano	Tadashi Ishikawa	4:19
6.	"Smile for Me"	Ryujin Inoue	Inoue	4:56
7.	"Onegai Post Man" ((おねがい POST MAN; "Please Post Man"))	KAO	Hajime Okano	4:00
8.	"She's Just a Rival"	Mutsumi Imai	Carbone; Belfield	4:01
9.	"Wakattenai yo ne Chi, Chi" ((わかってないよねCHI, CHI; "I Don't Know Chi, Chi"))	Taku Iriga	Johnny Fingers	4:00
10.	"Hit It"	Tomoko Toshima	Yukio Sugai	3:54
11.	"Omoide no Christmas" (Omoide no Kurisumasu (思い出のクリスマス; "Someday on Christmas"))	YOKO	Masanori Koyanagi	4:13
Total length:				45:52

2010 bonus tracks
No.	Title	Lyrics	Music	Arrangement	Length
12.	"Anata ni Kaeritai (Club Mix)" ((あなたに帰りたい -Club Mix-; "I Want to Go Back to You" (Club Mix)))	Asano	Inoue		6:26
13.	"Coffee Rumba (Club Mix)" (Kōhī Runba (コーヒー・ルンバ -Club Mix-))	Seiji Nakazawa	José Manzo Perroni		7:25
14.	"Dancing Hero (Eat You Up) (Club Mix)" (Danshingu Hīrō (Īto Yū Appu) (ダンシング・ヒーロー (Eat You Up) -Club Mix-))	Hitoshi Shinohara	Angelina Kyte; Anthony Baker	Kōichi Kaminaga; Toshihiko Kataoka; Sugai	5:50
15.	"Moonlight Blue (Club Mix)"	Asano	Carbone; Belfield		5:29
16.	"Steal Your Love (Club Mix)"	Mikami	Satoshi Hirose		6:39
Total length:					31:51

== Personnel ==
- Hitoshi Takaba – keyboards
- Kōichi Kaminaga – guitar
- Yukio Sugai – bass, drums
- Masato Honda – saxophone
- Ryujin Inoue – backing vocals
- Yumi Murata – backing vocals

== Charts ==
Chart (1992)	Peak position
Japanese Albums (Oricon)	27
