= Let's Shake =

2024 single by Yōko Oginome

Single by Yōko Oginome
- Language: Japanese
- Released: April 3, 2024
- Recorded: 2024
- Genre: J-pop; dance-pop
- Length: 3:38
- Label: Victor
- Songwriter: George Tokoro
- Producer: Noritake Kinashi

Yōko Oginome singles chronology
"Mushi no Tsubuyaki" (2020)	"Let's Shake" (2024)

Music video
- "Let's Shake" on YouTube

"Let's Shake" is the 43rd single by Japanese singer-songwriter Yōko Oginome. Written by George Tokoro, the single was released on April 3, 2024, by Victor Entertainment.

== Background and release ==
"Let's Shake" was released on streaming platforms on April 3, 2024, as part of Oginome's 40th anniversary.

The music video features Oginome demonstrating the "Neo Country Step Dance" (ネオ・カントリーステップダンス, Neo Kantorī Suteppu Dansu) with the dance group platinumboys (Joe Koike, Issei Makita, and Takuya Ogawa). The choreography was done by Tōru Miura, who previously worked with Oginome on the 2017 music video for "Dancing Hero (Eat You Up)". During the video, Oginome is seen wearing a pink wig as a nod to the original 1985 "Dancing Hero" music video.

== Track listing ==
No.	Title	Lyrics	Music	Arrangement	Length
1.	"Let's Shake"	George Tokoro	Tokoro	Tsutomu Ōhira	3:38
