= Mukokuseki Romance =

1985 single by Yōko Oginome

Single by Yōko Oginome

from the album Freesia no Ame
- Language: Japanese
- English title: A Romance Without Nationality
- B-side: "Tasogare Angel"
- Released: February 21, 1985
- Recorded: 1984
- Genre: J-pop; kayōkyoku; teen pop
- Length: 3:17
- Label: Victor
- Songwriters: Fumiko Okada; Ryuichi Sakamoto

Yōko Oginome singles chronology
"December Memory" (1984)	"Mukokuseki Romance" (1985)	"Koishite Caribbean" (1985)

Music video
- "Mukokuseki Romance" on YouTube

"Mukokuseki Romance" (無国籍ロマンス, Mukokuseki Romansu; lit. "A Romance Without Nationality") is the fourth single by Japanese singer Yōko Oginome. Written by Fumiko Okada and Ryuichi Sakamoto, the single was released on February 21, 1985, by Victor Entertainment.

== Background and release ==
A continuation of the "Sayonara kara Hajimaru Monogatari" video, the music video features Oginome performing the song in different environments such as a cabin by the snow, a dance studio, and a redressed version of the stage previously used in the "Mirai Kōkai (Sailing)" video.

"Mukokuseki Romance" peaked at No. 35 on Oricon's singles chart and sold over 27,000 copies.

== Track listing ==
1985 single
No.	Title	Lyrics	Music	Arrangement	Length
1.	"Mukokuseki Romance" (Mukokuseki Romansu (無国籍ロマンス; lit. "A Romance Without Nationality"))	Fumiko Okada	Ryuichi Sakamoto	Jun Irie	3:17
2.	"Tasogare Angel" (Tasogare Enjeru (たそがれエンジェル; lit. "Twilight Angel"))	Hiromi Kanda	Yukiyoshi Shimazu	Mitsuo Hagita	3:59

2013 bonus tracks
No.	Title	Length
3.	"Mukokuseki Romance (Original Karaoke)" ((無国籍ロマンス (オリジナル・カラオケ); lit. "A Romance Without Nationality (Original Karaoke)"))
4.	"Tasogare Angel (Original Karaoke)" ((たそがれエンジェル (オリジナル・カラオケ); lit. "Twilight Angel (Original Karaoke)"))

== Charts ==
Chart (1985)	Peak position
Oricon Weekly Singles Chart	35

== See also ==
- 1985 in Japanese music
