= Mushi no Tsubuyaki =

2020 single by Yōko Oginome

Single by Yōko Oginome

from the album Bug in a Dress
- Language: Japanese
- English title: An Insect's Chirps
- Released: August 5, 2020
- Recorded: 2020
- Genre: J-pop; children's
- Length: 2:43
- Label: Victor
- Songwriter: Yōko Oginome
- Producer: Yōko Oginome

Yōko Oginome singles chronology
"Dancing Hero: The Archives" (2015)	"Mushi no Tsubuyaki" (2020)	"Let's Shake" (2024)

Music video
- "Mushi no Tsubuyaki" on YouTube

"Mushi no Tsubuyaki" (虫のつぶやき; lit. "An Insect's Chirps") is the 42nd single by Japanese singer-songwriter Yōko Oginome. Written by Oginome, the single was released on August 5, 2020, by Victor Entertainment.

== Background and release ==
"Mushi no Tsubuyaki" is a lighthearted depiction of the Earth's ecology through the point of view of various insects. Oginome has been taking up entomology since childhood, and she has been catching and observing grasshoppers and dragonflies with her children. When she learned that other parents and children have lost interest in insects, she wrote the song to educate children about the insect ecology. The song is also the first to feature Oginome on ukulele.

The music video is a simple animation by Haruka Suzuki, featuring the various insects depicted in the song.

The single was featured in the August 2020 edition of NHK's Minna no Uta, becoming Oginome's second contribution to the program after her 1988 song "Jungle Dance".

== Track listing ==
No.	Title	Lyrics	Music	Arrangement	Length
1.	"Mushi no Tsubuyaki" ((虫のつぶやき; "An Insect's Chirps"))	Yōko Oginome	Oginome	Nobuhito "Una" Tanahashi	2:43
