= December Memory =

1984 single by Yōko Oginome

Single by Yōko Oginome

from the album Yōko Oginome: The Best
- Language: Japanese
- B-side: "Ame to Jasmine"
- Released: November 5, 1984
- Recorded: 1984
- Genre: J-pop; kayōkyoku; teen pop
- Length: 4:17
- Label: Victor
- Composer: Daisuke Inoue
- Lyricist: Yoshiko Miura

Yōko Oginome singles chronology
"Sayonara kara Hajimaru Monogatari" (1984)	"December Memory" (1984)	"Mukokuseki Romance" (1985)

Music video
- "December Memory" on YouTube

"December Memory" (ディセンバー・メモリー, Disenbā Memorī) is the third single by Japanese singer Yōko Oginome. Written by Yoshiko Miura and Daisuke Inoue, the single was released on November 5, 1984 by Victor Entertainment.

== Background and release ==
The song was used as an image song for Kao Corporation's Biore U skincare line. At the time of the song's release, actor Tsurutaro Kataoka gave Oginome her nickname "Oginome-chan" (荻野目ちゃん).

"December Memory" peaked at No. 39 on Oricon's singles chart and sold over 20,000 copies.

== Track listing ==
All lyrics are written by Yoshiko Miura; all music is composed by Daisuke Inoue; all music is arranged by Motoki Funayama.

1984 single
No.	Title	Length
1.	"December Memory" (Disenbā Memorī (ディセンバー・メモリー))	4:17
2.	"Ame to Jasmine" (Ame to Jasumin (雨とジャスミン; lit. "Rain and Jasmine"))	3:41

2013 bonus tracks
No.	Title	Length
3.	"December Memory (Original Karaoke)" ((ディセンバー・メモリー (オリジナル・カラオケ)))
4.	"Ame to Jasmine (Original Karaoke)" ((雨とジャスミン (オリジナル・カラオケ); lit. "Rain and Jasmine (Original Karaoke)"))

== Charts ==
Chart (1984)	Peak position
Oricon Weekly Singles Chart	39

== See also ==
- 1984 in Japanese music
