= Freesia no Ame =

Studio album by Yōko Oginome
- Released: March 5, 1985
- Recorded: 1984
- Genre: J-pop; kayōkyoku; teen pop
- Length: 40:33
- Language: Japanese
- Label: Victor

Yōko Oginome chronology
Teens Romance (1984)	Freesia no Ame (1985)	Kaigara Terrace (1985)

Singles from Freesia no Ame
- 1. "Mukokuseki Romance" Released: February 21, 1985

Freesia no Ame (フリージアの雨, Furīja no Ame; Freesia Rain) is the second studio album by Japanese singer Yōko Oginome. Released through Victor Entertainment on March 5, 1985, the album features the single "Mukokuseki Romance". The song "My Catherine" incorporates musical elements of the ABBA songs "Chiquitita" and "Fernando". The album was reissued on March 24, 2010, with two bonus tracks as part of Oginome's 25th anniversary celebration.

The album peaked at No. 26 on Oricon's albums chart and sold over 16,000 copies.

== Track listing ==
Side A
No.	Title	Lyrics	Music	Arrangement	Length
1.	"Irie ni Kaeru Yacht no Yō ni" (Irie ni Kaeru Yotto no Yō ni (入江に帰るヨットのように; "Like a Yacht Returning to a Cove"))	Seki Andō	Tetsuya Furumoto	Jun Irie	4:58
2.	"Freesia no Ame" (Furīja no Ame (フリージアの雨; "Freesia Rain"))	Takashi Matsumoto	Motoki Funayama	Funayama	3:39
3.	"Mukokuseki Romance" (Mukokuseki Romansu (無国籍ロマンス; "A Romance Without Nationality"))	Fumiko Okada	Ryuichi Sakamoto	Irie	3:20
4.	"Omoide no Juke Box" (Omoide no Jūku Bokkusu (想い出のジューク・ボックス; "Memories in a Jukebox"))	Hiromi Kanda	Daisuke Inoue	Funayama	4:21
5.	"My Catherine" (Mai Kyasarin (マイ キャサリン))	Yoshiko Miura	Yayoi Tanaka	Mitsuo Hagita	3:46
Total length:					20:07

Side B
No.	Title	Lyrics	Music	Arrangement	Length
1.	"B no Uwasa" (Bī no Uwasa (Bの噂; "The Rumor of B"))	Miura	Tsugutoshi Gotō	Irie	3:43
2.	"Kare to Kanojo to Hikōkigumo" ((彼と彼女とひこうき雲; "He and She and the Clouds"))	Miura	Inoue	Funayama	3:53
3.	"Poinsettia no Omoi" (Poinsechia no Omoi (ポインセチアの想い; "The Poinsettia's Feelings"))	Kyōko Matsumiya	Tanaka	Irie	3:50
4.	"Ame to Jasmine" (Ame to Jasumin (雨とジャスミン; "Rain and Jasmine"))	Miura	Inoue	Hagita	3:41
5.	"Ame no Memory" (Ame no Memorī (雨のメモリー; "Memories of the Rain"))	Okada	Kōji Makaino	Irie	5:16
Total length:					20:26

2010 bonus tracks
No.	Title	Lyrics	Music	Arrangement	Length
11.	"December Memory" (Disenbā Memorī (ディセンバー・メモリー))	Miura	Inoue	Funayama	4:19
12.	"Tasogare Angel" (Tasogare Enjeru (たそがれエンジェル; "Twilight Angel"))	Kanda	Yukiyoshi Shimazu	Hagita	3:59
Total length:					8:19

== Charts ==
Chart (1985)	Peak position
Japanese Albums (Oricon)	26

== See also ==
- 1985 in Japanese music
