= Romantic ni Aishite =

1992 single by Yōko Oginome

Single by Yōko Oginome

from the album Ryūkō Kashu
- Language: Japanese
- English title: I Love You Romantically
- B-side: "Inochi no Uta"
- Released: July 1, 1992
- Recorded: 1992
- Genre: J-pop; pop rock
- Label: Victor
- Songwriters: Miyuki Asano; Juichi Morishige
- Producer: Keisuke Tsukimitsu

Yōko Oginome singles chronology
"Coffee Rumba" (1992)	"Romantic ni Aishite" (1992)	"Yumemiru Planet" (1993)

Music video
- "Romantic ni Aishite" on YouTube

"Romantic ni Aishite" (ロマンティックに愛して, Romantikku ni Aishite; lit. "I Love You Romantically") is the 26th single by Japanese singer Yōko Oginome. Written by Miyuki Asano and Juichi Morishige, the single was released on July 1, 1992, by Victor Entertainment.

== Background and release ==
The song was used as the ending theme song of the NTV drama series Mokuyō Drama City (木曜ドラマシティ, Mokuyō Dorama Shiti; Thursday Drama City); Oginome appeared on the episode "Hokkaidō e irasshai" (北海道へいらっしゃい; "Welcome to Hokkaido").

The B-side, "Inochi no Uta", was used as an image song for the 1st Japan Expo Toyama '92.

"Romantic ni Aishite" peaked at No. 28 on Oricon's singles chart and sold over 43,000 copies.

== Track listing ==
No.	Title	Lyrics	Music	Arrangement	Length
1.	"Romantic ni Aishite" (Romantikku ni Aishite (ロマンティックに愛して; "I Love You Romantically"))	Miyuki Asano	Juichi Morishige	Yukio Sugai; Kōichi Kaminaga; Ryujin Inoue
2.	"Inochi no Uta" ((生命の詩(うた); "Song of Life"))	Takashi Matsumoto	Katsuhisa Hattori	Takayuki Hattori
3.	"Romantic ni Aishite (Original Karaoke)" ((ロマンティックに愛して(オリジナル・カラオケ); "I Love You Romantically (Original Karaoke)"))
4.	"Inochi no Uta (Original Karaoke)" ((生命の詩(うた)(オリジナル・カラオケ); "Song of Life (Original Karaoke)"))

== Charts ==
Chart (1992)	Peak position
Oricon Weekly Singles Chart	28
