= Bug in a Dress =

Studio album by Yōko Oginome
- Released: April 8, 2023 (LP); September 6, 2025 (Digital); June 22, 2026 (CD)
- Genre: J-pop
- Length: 30:42
- Language: Japanese
- Label: Rising Production
- Producer: Yōko Oginome

Yōko Oginome chronology
Dear Pop Singer (2014)	Bug in a Dress (2023)

Singles from Bug in a Dress
- 1. "Mushi no Tsubuyaki" Released: August 5, 2020

Bug in a Dress (バグ・イン・ア・ドレス, Bagu in a Doresu) is the 17th studio album by Japanese singer-songwriter Yōko Oginome. The album was her first release of original songs since her 1997 album Chains and her first self-released album. It was initially sold on LP exclusively at Oginome's live event on August 8–9, 2023, before it was released on download and streaming platforms on September 6, 2025, and on CD on June 22, 2026.

== Background ==
On August 5, 2020, Oginome released the single "Mushi no Tsubuyaki" for NHK's Minna no Uta. In an interview with The Asahi Shimbun, she wanted to release an album with songs that expressed her feelings while giving her the freedom to write her own songs and play instruments. Oginome drew inspiration from entomology, a hobby she took up since childhood.

== Track listing ==
=== LP version ===
All tracks are written by Yōko Oginome.

Side one
No.	Title	Arrangement	Length
1.	"Private Dancer"	Nobuhito "Una" Tanahashi
2.	"Anko Butter Koppepan" ((あんバターコッペパン; "Anko Butter Bun"))	Tanahashi
3.	"Blue"	Tanahashi
4.	"Hōseki: Ai no Uta" ((宝石～愛のうた～; "Gemstone: Love Song"))	Akira
5.	"Hōseki: Ai no Uta" (Instrumental)	Akira

Side two
No.	Title	Arrangement	Length
6.	"Nickname" (Nikkunēmu (ニックネーム))	Masaya Sakamoto; Yuka Sakamoto
7.	"Shiranaibasho" ((知らない場所; "An Unfamiliar Place"))	M. Sakamoto
8.	"Mei to An" ((明と暗; "Light and Darkness"))	M. Sakamoto; Y. Sakamoto
9.	"Race"	Takeo Asami
10.	"Mushi no Tsubuyaki (Acoustic Ver.)" ((虫のつぶやき; "An Insect's Chirps"))	Oginome

=== Digital media/CD version ===
No.	Title	Arrangement	Length
1.	"Private Dancer"	Tanahashi	2:06
2.	"Anko Butter Koppepan"	Tanahashi	3:28
3.	"Blue"	Tanahashi	2:45
4.	"Hōseki: Ai no Uta"	Akira	3:29
5.	"Nickname"	M. Sakamoto; Y. Sakamoto	3:00
6.	"Shiranaibasho"	M. Sakamoto	4:21
7.	"Mei to An"	M. Sakamoto; Y. Sakamoto	3:37
8.	"Race"	Asami	4:50
9.	"Mushi no Tsubuyaki" (Acoustic Ver.)	Oginome	3:06
Total length:			30:42

CD bonus track
No.	Title	Arrangement	Length
10.	"Hōseki: Ai no Uta" (Instrumental)	Akira
