= Magical Mystery "Mari" =

1985 live album by Mari Hamada

Live album by Mari Hamada
- Released: July 2, 1985
- Venue: Nakano Sunplaza; Osaka Kōsei Nenkin Kaikan
- Genre: Hard rock; heavy metal
- Length: 46:47
- Language: Japanese; English
- Label: Invitation

Mari Hamada chronology
Rainbow Dream (1985)	Magical Mystery "Mari" (1985)	Blue Revolution (1985)

Magical Mystery "Mari": Mari Hamada Live '85 (MAGICAL MYSTERY "MARI" 浜田麻里 LIVE '85) is a live album by Japanese singer/songwriter Mari Hamada. Recorded live at the Nakano Sunplaza and Osaka Kōsei Nenkin Kaikan, the album was released on July 2, 1985, by Invitation. The album was last reissued on October 22, 2008.

== Track listing ==
No.	Title	Lyrics	Music	Length
1.	"SE: Rainbow Dream ~ All Night Party"	Mari Hamada; Munetaka Higuchi Project Team	Hamada; Munetaka Higuchi Project Team	7:30
2.	"The Moment of Truth"	Dennis Lambert; Peter Beckett; Bill Conti	Lambert; Beckett; Conti	4:23
3.	"Misty Lady"	Hamada	Hamada	4:45
4.	"Free Way ~ Last Scene"	Hamada	Hamada; Hiroaki Matsuzawa	8:42
5.	"Tokio Makin' Love"	Munetaka Higuchi Project Team	Munetaka Higuchi Project Team	4:29
6.	"Runaway from Yesterday"	Munetaka Higuchi Project Team	Munetaka Higuchi Project Team	6:20
7.	"Paradise"	Hamada	Hiroyuki Ohtsuki	4:33
8.	"Don't Change Your Mind ~ SE: So Long"	Munetaka Higuchi Project Team	Munetaka Higuchi Project Team	6:04

== Video album ==
Magical Mystery "Mari"

Video by Mari Hamada
- Released: June 21, 1985
- Genre: J-pop; heavy metal
- Language: Japanese
- Label: Invitation

Mari Hamada chronology
Misty Lady (1984)	Magical Mystery "Mari" (1985)	Blue Revolution Tour: Mari Hamada Live (1985)

The video album for Magical Mystery "Mari" was released on VHS and LaserDisc formats on June 21, 1985. It was reissued on DVD by Victor Entertainment under the Speedstar label on January 21, 2005. The video was released on Blu-ray on February 7, 2024 as part of Hamada's 40th anniversary.

=== Track listing ===
No.	Title	Length
1.	"All Night Party"
2.	"The Moment of Truth ~ SE: Rainbow Dream"
3.	"Misty Lady"
4.	"From Long Ago"
5.	"Spacer"
6.	"Last Scene"
7.	"Xanadu"
8.	"Tokio Makin' Love"
9.	"Runaway from Yesterday"
10.	"Don't Change Your Mind ~ SE: So Long"
11.	"Free Way"

== See also ==
- 1985 in Japanese music
