= Kitakaze no Carol =

1987 single by Yōko Oginome

Single by Yōko Oginome

from the album Pop Groover: The Best
- Language: Japanese
- English title: North Wind Carol
- B-side: "Getsuyōbi no Marīna"
- Released: October 27, 1987
- Recorded: 1987
- Genre: J-pop; dance-pop; kayōkyoku
- Length: 3:54
- Label: Victor
- Songwriters: Masao Urino; Kyōhei Tsutsumi
- Producer: Masao Urino

Yōko Oginome singles chronology
"Sayonara no Kajitsutachi" (1987)	"Kitakaze no Carol" (1987)	"Stranger Tonight" (1988)

Music video
- "Kitakaze no Carol" on YouTube

"Kitakaze no Carol" (北風のキャロル, Kitakaze no Kyaroru; lit. "North Wind Carol") is the 13th single by Japanese singer Yōko Oginome. Written by Masao Urino and Kyōhei Tsutsumi, the single was released on October 27, 1987, by Victor Entertainment.

== Background and release ==
The song was used as the theme song of the TBS drama special Akachan ni Kampai! (赤ちゃんに乾杯!; Cheers for Baby!), which also starred Oginome.

"Kitakaze no Carol" peaked at No. 2 on Oricon's singles chart and also sold over 117,000 copies.

In 1991, Oginome re-recorded the song in a Christmas style, titled "Kitakaze no Carol (On Christmas Day)" (北風のキャロル -on Christmas day-; "North Wind Carol -On Christmas Day-"); this version was released in the remix album New Take: Best Collections '92.

== Track listing ==
All lyrics are written by Masao Urino; all music is composed by Kyōhei Tsutsumi; all music is arranged by Hiroshi Shinkawa.

1987 single
No.	Title	Length
1.	"Kitakaze no Carol" (Kitakaze no Kyaroru (北風のキャロル; "North Wind Carol"))	3:54
2.	"Getsuyōbi no Marīna" ((月曜日のマリーナ; "Monday Marina"))	4:18

2013 bonus tracks
No.	Title	Length
3.	"Kitakaze no Carol (Original Karaoke)" ((北風のキャロル (オリジナル・カラオケ); "North Wind Carol" (Original Karaoke)"))
4.	"Getsuyōbi no Marīna (Original Karaoke)" ((月曜日のマリーナ (オリジナル・カラオケ); "North Wind Marina (Original Karaoke)"))

== Charts ==
Chart (1987)	Peak position
Oricon Weekly Singles Chart	2
The Best Ten	4

== See also ==
- 1987 in Japanese music
