= Teens Romance =

Studio album by Yōko Oginome
- Released: September 5, 1984
- Recorded: 1984
- Genre: J-pop; kayōkyoku; teen pop
- Length: 37:36
- Language: Japanese
- Label: Victor

Yōko Oginome chronology
Teens Romance (1984)	Freesia no Ame (1985)

Singles from Teens Romance
- 1. "Mirai Kōkai (Sailing)" Released: April 3, 1984; 2. "Sayonara kara Hajimaru Monogatari" Released: July 21, 1984

Teens Romance (ティーンズ・ロマンス, Tīnzu Romansu) is the debut studio album by Japanese singer Yōko Oginome. Released through Victor Entertainment on September 5, 1984, the album features the singles "Mirai Kōkai (Sailing)" and "Sayonara kara Hajimaru Monogatari", as well as "Sapphire-iro no Prelude", a cover of Marjorie Noël's "Dans le meme wagon". It was reissued on March 24, 2010, with two bonus tracks as part of Oginome's 25th anniversary celebration.

The album peaked at No. 24 on Oricon's albums chart and sold over 23,000 copies.

== Track listing ==
Side A
No.	Title	Lyrics	Music	Arrangement	Length
1.	"Mirai Kōkai (Sailing)" ((未来航海-Sailing-; "Future Voyage -Sailing-"))	Hiromi Kanda	Yukiyoshi Shimazu	Mitsuo Hagita	3:15
2.	"Sapphire-iro no Prelude" (Safaia-iro no Pureryūdo (サファイア色のプレリュード; "Sapphire Colored Prelude"))	Kanda	Eddy Marnay; Guy Magenta	Hagita	2:44
3.	"Natsu no Hohoemi" ((夏の微笑; "Summer Smile"))	Yoshiko Miura	Yayoi Tanaka	Makoto Matsushita	5:01
4.	"Jūgatsu Monogatari" ((十月物語; "October Story"))	Kanda	Shimazu	Kazuo Ōtani	3:49
5.	"Kanashimi Present" (Kanashimi Purezento (悲しみプレゼント; "A Present of Sadness"))	Miura	Tetsuya Furumoto	Hagita	3:53
Total length:					18:44

Side B
No.	Title	Lyrics	Music	Arrangement	Length
1.	"Sayonara kara Hajimaru Monogatari" ((さよならから始まる物語; "A Story That Begins with a Goodbye"))	Chinfa Kan	Furumoto	Hagita	3:18
2.	"Planet Nocturne" (Puranetto Nokutān (星空夜曲（プラネット・ノクターン）))	Kanda	Tanaka	Matsushita	4:18
3.	"Ryūsei Shōjo" ((流星少女; "Meteor Girl"))	Yoko Aki	Yūichirō Oda	Hagita	4:06
4.	"Niji-iro Syndrome" (Niji-iro Shindorōmu (虹色シンドローム; "Iridescent Syndrome"))	Aki	Oda	Hagita	3:46
5.	"Teens Romance" (Tīnzu Romansu (ティーンズ・ロマンス))	Kanda	Akari Misuzawa	Ōtani	3:43
Total length:					19:13

2010 bonus tracks
No.	Title	Lyrics	Music	Arrangement	Length
11.	"Mirai Kōkai (Sailing) -New Version-" ((未来航海-Sailing- -New Version-; "Future Voyage -Sailing- -New Version-"))	Kanda	Shimazu	Ryō Yonemitsu	3:19
12.	"Sayonara kara Hajimaru Monogatari -New Version-" ((さよならから始まる物語 -New Version-; "A Story That Begins with a Goodbye -New Version-"))	Kan	Furumoto	Yonemitsu	3:19
Total length:					6:37

== Charts ==
Chart (1984)	Peak position
Japanese Albums (Oricon)	24

== See also ==
- 1984 in Japanese music
