= Odin (EP) =

EP by Loudness
- Released: 1985 in Japan
- Studio: Sedic Studio, Nippon Columbia Studio, Sound Inn Studio, Tokyo, Japan
- Genre: Heavy metal
- Length: 16:23
- Label: Nippon Columbia
- Producer: Loudness

Loudness chronology
Disillusion (1984)	Odin (1985)	Thunder in the East (1985)

Odin soundtrack cover

Odin is an EP by Japanese heavy metal band Loudness. The EP was released in Japan in 1985, with and without the instrumental tracks. All tracks on the EP were included on the soundtrack of the Japanese anime film Odin: Photon Sailer Starlight, released that same year.

== Track listing ==
All music by Akira Takasaki, and all lyrics by Minoru Niihara.

No.	Title	Length
1.	"Gotta Fight"	3:45
2.	"Eruption" (instrumental)	3:14
3.	"Odin"	5:17
4.	"Flash Out" (instrumental)	4:07
Total length:		16:23

== Personnel ==
Loudness

- Minoru Niihara – vocals
- Akira Takasaki – guitars
- Masayoshi Yamashita – bass
- Munetaka Higuchi – drums

Additional musicians

- Masanori Sasaji – keyboards

Production

- Masahiro Miyasawa – engineer

== See also ==
- 1985 in Japanese music
