= Route 246 Connexion =

Studio album by Yōko Oginome
- Released: July 16, 1987
- Recorded: 1986–1987
- Genre: J-pop; dance-pop; kayōkyoku
- Length: 38:42
- Language: Japanese
- Label: Victor
- Producer: Masao Urino

Yōko Oginome chronology
Non-Stopper: Yōko Oginome "The Beat" Special (1986)	Route 246 Connexion (1987)	Pop Groover: The Best (1987)

Singles from Route 246 Connexion
- 1. "Wangan Taiyōzoku" Released: March 3, 1987; 2. "Sayonara no Kajitsutachi" Released: June 21, 1987

Alternate cover
- Original 1987 CD cover

Route 246 Connexion (246コネクション, Ni Yon Roku Konekushon) is the sixth studio album by Japanese singer Yōko Oginome. Produced by Masao Urino and released through Victor Entertainment on July 16, 1987, the album features the hit singles "Wangan Taiyōzoku" and "Sayonara no Kajitsutachi", the latter being her first No. 1 single. Route 246 Connexion is a concept album themed around Japan National Route 246. A karaoke version of the album was released on September 1, 1987. The album was reissued on April 21, 2010 with seven bonus tracks as part of Oginome's 25th anniversary celebration.

The album peaked at No. 2 on Oricon's albums chart and sold over 274,000 copies.

== Track listing ==
All lyrics are written by Masao Urino; all music is composed by Kyōhei Tsutsumi, except where indicated.

Side A
No.	Title	Arrangement	Length
1.	"246 Planet Girls" (Tsū Fō Shikkusu Puranetto Gāruzu (246プラネット・ガールズ))	Hiroshi Shinkawa	4:39
2.	"Kita-Aoyama 3-chōme 4-banchi" ((北青山3丁目4番地))	Satoshi Takebe	4:19
3.	"Zoku Roppongi Junjōha" ("Roppongi Pure-Heart Clique Sequel" (続・六本木純情派))	Takebe	3:54
4.	"Killer-dōri wa Mainichi ga Party" (Kirā-dōri wa Mainichi ga Pātī (キラー通りは毎日がパーティー; "Every Day Is a Party on Killer Street"))	Shirō Sagisu	4:40
5.	"Babylon a Go Go" (Babiron a Gō Gō (バビロン A GO GO))	Sagisu	3:34
Total length:			21:09

Side B
No.	Title	Music	Arrangement	Length
1.	"Sayonara no Kajitsutachi (Version II)" ((さよならの果実たち (Version II); "Goodbye Fruits (Version II)"))		Takebe	3:50
2.	"Kanashiki Hairpin Circus" (Kanashiki Heapin Sākasu (悲しきヘアピン・サーカス; "Hairpin Circus of Sadness"))		Shinkawa	4:00
3.	"Karuizawa Connexion" (Karuizawa Konekushon (軽井沢コネクション))		Sagisu	3:46
4.	"Shōnen no Saigo no Natsu" ((少年の最後の夏; "A Boy's Last Summer"))		Sagisu	4:10
5.	"Wangan Taiyōzoku (Version II)" ((湾岸太陽族 (Version II); "Bayshore Route Sun Tribe (Version II)"))	Minoru Yamazaki	Akira Nishihira; Sagisu	3:42
6.	"Hishochi no Dekigoto" ((避暑地の出来事; "Events in the Summer Resort"))		Shinkawa	4:24
Total length:				23:53

2010 bonus tracks
No.	Title	Music	Arrangement	Length
12.	"Wangan Taiyōzoku" ((湾岸太陽族; "Bayshore Route Sun Tribe"))	Yamazaki	Nishihira	3:41
13.	"Konayuki no Resort" (Konayuki no Rizōto (粉雪のリゾート; "Powdered Snow Resort"))	Tetsuya Furumoto	Nishihira	4:23
14.	"Sayonara no Kajitsutachi" ((さよならの果実たち; "Goodbye Fruits"))		Takebe	3:46
15.	"Loftside Graffiti" (Rofutosaido Gurafiti (ロフトサイド・グラフィティ))		Shinkawa	4:10
16.	"Kitakaze no Carol" (Kitakaze no Kyaroru (北風のキャロル; "North Wind Carol"))		Shinkawa	3:57
17.	"Getsuyōbi no Marina" (Getsuyōbi no Marīna (月曜日のマリーナ; Monday Marina))		Shinkawa	4:20
18.	"Kitakaze no Carol -On Christmas Day-" ((北風のキャロル -on Christmas day-; "North Wind Carol -On Christmas Day-"))		Akira Nishihira	4:18
Total length:				27:51

== Charts ==
Weekly charts

Chart (1987)	Peak position
Japanese Albums (Oricon)	2

Year-end charts

Chart (1987)	Peak position
Japanese Albums (Oricon)	25

== See also ==
- 1987 in Japanese music
