= The Triple Cross =

1992 Japanese crime film

- Theatrical release poster
- Directed by: Kinji Fukasaku
- Written by: Shoichi Maruyama
- Cinematography: Takeshi Hamada
- Edited by: Akimasa Kawashima
- Release date: 1992
- Running time: 104 minutes
- Country: Japan
- Language: Japanese

The Triple Cross (いつかギラギラする日, Itsuka giragira suru hi) (a.k.a. The Day's Too Bright) is a 1992 Japanese film directed by Kinji Fukasaku.

== Plot ==
Kanzaki, Shiba, and Imura are a trio of robbers who commit a series of bank robberies, making off with hundreds of millions of yen. They lay low for a year until Imura falls into serious debt and begs to be a part of another robbery. Shiba introduces them to Kadomachi, the young owner of a rock club. Following Kadomachi's plan, they rob an armored car expected to be transporting 200 million yen from a hotel at Lake Tōya to a bank in Sapporo. When they discover that the armored car was only carrying 50 million yen, Imura attempts to rob the others at gunpoint but is overcome with guilt and drops the gun. Kadomachi grabs the gun and shoots at the others, killing Imura before stealing the money and blowing up the safe house with dynamite. Kanzaki and Shiba are injured but Kanzaki's girlfriend Misato arrives and drives them away.

Kadomachi sneaks into Shiba's home and meets up with Shiba's young girlfriend Mai, with whom Kadomachi was supposed to split the money. Disappointed that the haul is less than expected, she steals the money and hides it away from Kadomachi.

Kanzaki visits Kadomachi's club, where he learns about Kadomachi's relationship with Mai and his debt to a loan shark named Yoshida. Kanzaki forces his way into Yoshida's office and learns that Kadomachi promised to pay him the next day. Yoshida sees a news report about the armored car robbery and realizes where Kadomachi got the money. Yoshida hires the hitman Tatsuo to kill Kanzaki and Kadomachi so that he can take all the money as well as the club.

Kanzaki hires Dr. Sakagari, a quack plastic surgeon, to remove the bullet near Shiba's heart. Imura's widow calls and asks to speak with Kanzaki. Misato gives Kanzaki 1 million yen and is dropped off at a resort, where two bikers attempt to assault and rob her before she slashes their faces with a razor blade, causing them to fall into the water. Kanzaki visits Imura's widow and gives her the 1 million yen so that she can pay that month's payment of 800,000 yen to a loan shark to whom Imura owed money. She tells him that Imura was actually a Korean named Kim, then puts on lipstick and leaves for an appointment.

Mai calls from a payphone and lures Kanzaki outside. There is a gunfight between Mai, Kanzaki, and Kadomachi until Mai uses Kadomachi's flashy red car to ram Kanzaki into the water. Kadomachi shoots into the water several times, then leads the police on a car chase before losing them. Kanzaki survives and returns home to Misato and Shiba, who awakens and dies. Misato later quits her job as a maid for a wealthy family.

Kadomachi convinces Mai to retrieve the money from the bank. Yoshida wants the money brought to his office so that he can steal it and take over the club, but Kadomachi insists on exchanging the money for the deeds in public in Hakodate at his club. Before anyone arrives, Kanzaki causes an explosion in front of the club using a homemade bomb. Police surround the club to investigate, so when Yoshida brings his men and Tatsuo there they do not initially enter. Kadomachi arrives with Mai and sees Kanzaki as well as Yoshida, so he flees and leads them on a car chase. When they lose Yoshida and his men, Kadomachi empties the bag of money and fills it with Mai's clothes, then tells her to take the money back to the club. She evades the police in his car while Kadomachi hijacks a bus. Tatsuo shoots the driver and jumps onto the bus, which Kadomachi crashes into a construction site. Kanzaki and Yoshida arrive, followed by Mai, who is being chased by the police. Mai fires a machine gun at the police before being shot by Tatsuo. Kadomachi and Kanzaki shoot Tatsuo dead, then Kadomachi carries Mai back to his car and drives away. Yoshida and his men search the bus for the money but only find Mai's clothes before being arrested by the police.

An up-and-coming band plays at the club's opening night to a crowd of excited fans. Mai dies in the car before Kanzaki rams into it, turning it over. Kadomachi attacks Kanzaki with a knife but Kanzaki stabs him in the neck and drives off with the money. A young policeman asks Kadomachi who stabbed him, but Kadomachi simply tells the young man that he should be ashamed for wearing a policeman's uniform. Kanzaki rams his car through the police barricade and crashes it into the water as the money floats to the surface. The next day, Kanzaki and Misato are shown riding a bus through a new city laughing while looking at all of the banks to potentially rob.

== Cast ==
- Kenichi Hagiwara as Kanzaki
- Kazuya Kimura as Kadomachi
- Keiko Oginome as Mai
- Sonny Chiba as Shiba
- Yoshio Harada as Noji
- Renji Ishibashi as Imura
- Kirin Kiki
- Yumi Takigawa as Misato
- Nobuo Yana

== Other Credits ==
- Produced by
  - Hisao Nabeshima - producer
  - Yoshihisa Nakagawa - planner
  - Kazuyoshi Okuyama - producer
- Production Design: Tsutomu Imamura
- Gaffer: Kôichi Watanabe
