= Kaigara Terrace =

Studio album by Yōko Oginome
- Released: September 5, 1985
- Recorded: 1985
- Genre: J-pop; kayōkyoku; teen pop
- Length: 40:03
- Language: Japanese
- Label: Victor

Yōko Oginome chronology
Freesia no Ame (1985)	Kaigara Terrace (1985)	Yōko Oginome: The Best (1985)

Singles from Kaigara Terrace
- 1. "Koishite Caribbean" Released: May 21, 1985; 2. "Kokoro no Mama ni (I'm Just a Lady)" Released: August 5, 1985

Kaigara Terrace (貝殻テラス, Kaigara Terasu; Seashell Terrace) is the third studio album by Japanese singer Yōko Oginome. Released through Victor Entertainment on September 5, 1985, the album features the singles "Koishite Caribbean" and "Kokoro no Mama ni (I'm Just a Lady)". Yasushi Akimoto handled majority of the album's lyrics. It was reissued on March 24, 2010 with four bonus tracks as part of Oginome's 25th anniversary celebration.

The album peaked at No. 27 on Oricon's albums chart and sold over 20,000 copies.

== Track listing ==
Side A
No.	Title	Lyrics	Music	Arrangement	Length
1.	"Koishite Caribbean" (Koishite Karibian (恋してカリビアン; "Love in the Caribbean"))	Gorō Matsui	Hideya Nakazaki	Nakazaki	3:51
2.	"Cecil wa Toshigoro" (Seshiru wa Toshigoro (セシルは年頃; "Cecil Is Around"))	Matsui	Motoki Funayama	Funayama	3:14
3.	"Aishū Caravan" (Aishū Kyaraban (哀愁キャラバン; "Sorrowful Caravan"))	Fumiko Okada	Kimio Mizutani	Mizutani	3:41
4.	"Yūhi no Gondola" (Yūhi no Gondora (夕陽のゴンドラ; "Sunset Gondola"))	Yasushi Akimoto	Yayoi Tanaka	Mitsuo Hagita	4:18
5.	"2B no Enpitsu" (Ni Bī no Enpitsu (2Bの鉛筆; "2B Pencil"))	Takashi Matsumoto	Funayama	Funayama	4:08
Total length:					19:14

Side B
No.	Title	Lyrics	Music	Arrangement	Length
1.	"Kokoro no Mama ni (I'm Just a Lady)" ((心のままに〜I'm just a lady〜; "As You Please (I'm Just a Lady)"))	Mai Arai	Arai	Hagita	4:20
2.	"Kyūgatsu no Tokai" ((9月の都会; "September in the City"))	Akimoto	Akira Mitake	Kazuo Ōtani	4:22
3.	"Kaigara Terrace" (Kaigara Terasu (貝殻テラス; "Seashell Terrace"))	Akimoto	Funayama	Funayama	3:37
4.	"Heart no Present" (Hāto no Purezento (ハートのプレゼント; "Present of the Heart"))	Akimoto	Mitake	Ōtani	4:46
5.	"Joanna"	Akimoto	Hideya Nakazaki	Nakazaki	3:42
Total length:					20:49

2010 bonus tracks
No.	Title	Lyrics	Music	Arrangement	Length
11.	"Ai no Time Capsule" (Ai no Taimu Kapuseru (愛のタイムカプセル; "Love Time Capsule"))	Akimoto	Funayama	Funayama	2:56
12.	"Sweet Vacation" (Suīto Vakēshon (スイート・ヴァケーション))	Akimoto	Nakazaki	Nakazaki	3:19
13.	"Koishite Caribbean -New Version-" (Koishite Karibian -Nyū Bājon- (恋してカリビアン -New Version-; "Love in the Caribbean -New Version-"))	Matsui	Nakazaki	Ryō Yonemitsu	3:57
14.	"Kokoro no Mama ni (I'm Just an Angel) -New Version-" ((心のままに〜I'm just a lady〜 -New Version-; "As You Please (I'm Just a Lady) -New Version-"))	Arai	Arai	Yonemitsu	4:21
Total length:					14:34

== Charts ==
Chart (1985)	Peak position
Japanese Albums (Oricon)	27

== See also ==
- 1985 in Japanese music
