= Dear Pop Singer =

Dear Pop Singer.

Studio album by Yōko Oginome
- Released: August 20, 2014
- Recorded: 2014
- Genres: J-pop; dance-pop
- Length: 48:05
- Language: Japanese
- Label: Victor

Yōko Oginome chronology
Original Album Collection: The Box (2010)	Dear Pop Singer. (2014)	Bug in a Dress (2023)

Music video
- Dear Pop Singer all songs digest on YouTube

Dear Pop Singer. (ディア・ポップシンガー, Dia Poppu Shingā) is a cover album by Japanese singer/songwriter Yōko Oginome. Released through Victor Entertainment on August 20, 2014 to celebrate Oginome's 30th anniversary, the album features covers of popular western songs, as well as self-covers of her past hits. A limited edition release includes a DVD containing a new music video for "Dancing Hero (Eat You Up)" and some live performances.

The album peaked at No. 38 on Oricon's albums chart.

== Track listing ==
No.	Title	Lyrics	Music	Original artist	Length
1.	"99 Big Balloons"	Carlo Karges; Uwe Fahrenkrog-Petersen; Yōko Oginome	Karges; Fahrenkrog-Petersen	Nena	3:54
2.	"Nee" ((ねえ; "Hey"))	Reo Mikami	Tadashi Ishikawa	Yōko Oginome	4:34
3.	"Hot Stuff ~Koi no Kakehiki~" (Hotto Sutaffu ~Koi no Kakehiki~ (ホット・スタッフ ～恋のかけひき～; "Hot Stuff ~Love Call~"))	Pete Bellotte; Harold Faltermeyer; Keith Forsey; Oginome	Bellotte; Faltermeyer; Forsey	Donna Summer	4:02
4.	"Coffee Rumba" (Kōhī Runba (コーヒー・ルンバ))	Seiji Nakazawa; José Manzo Perroni	Perroni	Yōko Oginome	4:27
5.	"Lovin' You Baby" (Ravin Yū Beibī (ラヴィン・ユー・ベイビー))	Paul Stanley; Vini Poncia; Desmond Child; Oginome	Stanley; Poncia; Child	Kiss	3:55
6.	"Dancing Hero (Eat You Up)" (Danshingu Hīrō (Eat You Up) (ダンシング・ヒーロー (Eat You Up)))	Hitoshi Shinohara	Angelina Kyte; Anthony Baker	Oginome	3:48
7.	"Breakout ~Hikero, Watashi~" (Bureikuauto ~Hikero, Watashi~ (ブレイクアウト ～弾けろ、ワタシ～; "Breakout ~Play with Me~"))	Andy Connell; Corinne Drewery; Martin Jackson; Oginome	Connell; Drewery; Jackson	Swing Out Sister	3:49
8.	"Steal Your Love"	Mikami	Satoshi Hirose	Yōko Oginome	4:23
9.	"Freedom" (Furīdamu (フリーダム))	George Michael	Michael	Wham!	4:48
10.	"Roppongi Junjōha" ((六本木純情派; "Roppongi Pure-Heart Clique"))	Masao Urino	Akihiro Yoshimi	Yōko Oginome	3:30
11.	"Kimi to Time Machine" (Kimi to Taimu Mashin (キミとタイムマシン; "You and the Time Machine"))	Oginome; Hidehito Ikumo; Valerie Stern	Ikumo; Stern	[new track]	3:07
12.	"Dancing Hero (Eat You Up) [Remix]" ((ダンシング・ヒーロー (Eat You Up) [Remix]))	Shinohara	Kyte; Baker	Yōko Oginome	3:42
Total length:					48:05

- All tracks are arranged by Seiji Motoyama, except the following:

- Tracks 2 and 8 arranged by Takahiro Yamada
- Track 3 arranged by Akkie
- Track 5 arranged by Toshiya Shimizu
- Track 11 arranged by Hidehito Ikumo and Valerie Stern
- Track 12 arranged by oglaorzzy

Bonus DVD
No.	Title	Length
1.	"Dancing Hero (Eat You Up) [New Dance Version] (Music video)" ((ダンシング・ヒーロー (Eat You Up) [New Dance Version]))
2.	"Making of Video (BGM: "Steal Your Love"/"Nee")" ((メイキング映像 （BGM：STEAL YOUR LOVE～ねえ）))
3.	"Roppongi Junjōha (Live)" ((六本木純情派 (Live)))
4.	"Dancing Hero (Eat You Up) (Live)" ((ダンシング・ヒーロー (Eat You Up) (Live)))
5.	"Steal Your Love (Live)"
6.	"Nee (Live)" ((ねえ (Live)))
7.	"Coffee Rumba (Live)" ((コーヒー・ルンバ (Live)))

- Tracks 3–4 recorded from Verge of Love: Budokan Live (Nippon Budokan, 1989)
- Tracks 5–7 recorded from Pop Liberation Force (Tokyo Kōsei Nenkin Kaikan, 1992)

== Charts ==
Chart (2014)	Peak position
Japanese Albums (Oricon)	38
Japanese Top Albums Sales (Billboard)	33
