= Keiko Oginome =

Japanese actress

Keiko Oginome 荻野目 慶子
- Born: September 4, 1964 (age 61); Saitama, Japan
- Occupation: Actress
- Years active: 1977–present
- Relatives: Yōko Oginome (sister)

Keiko Oginome (荻野目 慶子, Oginome Keiko) is a Japanese actress.

== Biography ==
At the age of 12, Keiko Oginome joined the theater company Himawari. She made her acting debut in the 1977 film Gokumontō. In 1979, she played the role of Helen Keller in the Japanese-language production of the stage play The Miracle Worker. She then became the host of the NHK variety show You and starred in the 1983 film Antarctica.

In 1992, Oginome starred in the film The Triple Cross, which earned her the Best Supporting Actress award at the 14th Yokohama Film Festival (shared with Misa Shimizu). She also released the nude photo book Surrender, which was photographed by film director Yoshitaka Kawai before his suicide in 1990.

== Personal life ==
Yōko Oginome is her younger sister.

In 1985, Oginome had an affair with film director Yoshitaka Kawai, who was married at the time. Kawai was found dead in Oginome's apartment on April 30, 1990, having hanged himself after Oginome allegedly wanted to end their relationship. A year after Kawai's death, Oginome had an affair with The Triple Cross director Kinji Fukusaku, who was 34 years her senior. Their relationship lasted 10 years, until his death from prostate cancer in 2003.

On December 31, 2012, Oginome married a non-celebrity.

== Filmography ==
=== Film ===
- Gokumontō (1977)
- Kaijōon (1980), Iyo Unoshima
- Antarctica (1983), Asako Shimura
- Bakayarō! 2 Shiawaseninaritai. Episode 3: "Atarashisa ni Tsuiteikenai" (1989), Murako Takahashi
- Ultra Q the Movie: Legend of the Stars (1990), Yuriko Edogawa
- Kagerō (1991), Koyoshi
- The Triple Cross (1992), Mai
- Kōkō Kyōshi (1993), Miwa Sakaki
- Crest of Betrayal (1994), Oume
- Ramro (1994) (uncredited)
- Minazuki (1999), Sayako
- Noroime (2000), Marie Sekikawa
- By Player (2000), Kimie
- Kanzen naru Shiiku: Onna Rihatsushi no Koi (2004), Harumi Imai
- Veronica wa Shinu Koto ni Shita (2006), Lady
- Yūheisha Terrorist (2007), Elder Sister
- Jirochō Sango Kushi (2008), Okoma
- Yoroi Samurai Zombie (2009), Yasuko
- Yamagata Scream (2009), Tsuruko
- Tsuya no Yoru aru ai ni Kakawatta, Onnatachi no Monogatari (2013), Aiko Tenma

=== Television ===
- Musashibō Benkei (1986), Tamamushi
- Yako no Kaidan (2009), Minako Murase
