= Nee (Yōko Oginome song) =

1991 single by Yōko Oginome

Single by Yōko Oginome

from the album Ryūkō Kashu
- Language: Japanese
- English title: Hey
- B-side: "Sasayaka na Resistance"
- Released: December 16, 1991
- Recorded: 1991
- Genre: J-pop; dance-pop; pop rock
- Label: Victor
- Songwriters: Reo Mikami; Tadashi Ishikawa
- Producer: Keisuke Tsukimitsu

Yōko Oginome singles chronology
"Bijo to Yajū" (1991)	"Nee" (1991)	"Steal Your Love" (1992)

Music video
- "Nee" on YouTube

"Nee" (ねえ, Nē; lit. "Hey") is the 23rd single by Japanese singer Yōko Oginome. Written by Reo Mikami and Tadashi Ishikawa, the single was released on December 16, 1991, by Victor Entertainment.

== Background and release ==
The song was used by Xebio Holdings for their Victoria sporting goods store commercial featuring Oginome.

"Nee" peaked at No. 14 on Oricon's singles chart and sold over 206,000 copies, marking a career resurgence for Oginome.

Oginome re-recorded the song in her 2014 cover album Dear Pop Singer.

== Track listing ==
All music is arranged by Yukio Sugai, Kōichi Kaminaga, and Ryujin Inoue.

No.	Title	Lyrics	Music	Length
1.	"Nee" (Nē (ねえ; "Hey"))	Reo Mikami	Tadashi Ishikawa
2.	"Sasayaka na Resistance" (Sasayaka na Rejisutansu (ささやかなレジスタンス; "A Modest Resistance"))	Miyuki Asano	Inoue
3.	"Nee (Original Karaoke)" ((ねえ(オリジナル・カラオケ); "Hey (Original Karaoke)"))
4.	"Sasayaka na Resistance (Original Karaoke)" ((ささやかなレジスタンス(オリジナル・カラオケ); "A Modest Resistance (Original Karaoke)"))

== Charts ==
Weekly charts

Chart (1991)	Peak position
Oricon Weekly Singles Chart	14

Year-end charts

Chart (1991)	Peak position
Oricon Year-End Chart	99
