= Sonoko Sakai =

American cooking teacher and food writer

- Born: 71–72; Queens, New York City, U.S.
- Occupations: Food writer and cookbook author
- Writing career
- Language: English
- Subject: Cooking
- Website: sonokosakai.com

Sonoko Sakai is a Japanese American cooking teacher and food writer. She has worked as a foreign-film buyer and producer. She was also a buyer for Kadokawa, Gaga and Nippon Herald before focusing on the food industry. She writes about Japanese cuisine at the Los Angeles Times and, in 2011, she created the organization called Common Grains. Common Grains promotes Japanese food and culture and has an emphasis on rice and grains. Common Grains has organized food pop-ups, cooking classes, onigiri (rice ball) competitions and speaker panels. In 2013, she went to Google headquarters to oversee the Japanese dinner for 800 employees.

== Early life ==
Sakai was born in Queens, New York City, to a Japanese executive with Japan Airlines who was stationed in New York. She grew up in the United States, Mexico and Japan. She is currently based in California.

== Media career ==
Sakai's stories and recipes have appeared in The Los Angeles Times, New York Times, Chicago Tribune, San Francisco Chronicle, Saveur, Lucky Peach and Zester Daily. She has appeared on national television, including the Food Network, and public radio — KCRW's Good Food and Sounds L.A., PRI’s “The World.”

She was featured in the Omotenashi episode of KCET's The Migrant Kitchen, demonstrating Nihachi-Style Soba.

She was featured in the It Starts with Dashi episode of the Big Root podcast.

She was featured in the Inside the Incredible World of Japanese Cooking with Sonoko Sakai episode of the Milk Street radio program explaining how to make broth, bento boxes, and udon dough.

Sakai appeared on the PBS channel's program Milk Street Television in the episode Udon Noodles at Home in 2021 to demonstrate the making of udon noodles and their use in the recipe for Udon Noodles with Spicy Meat and Mushroom Sauce.

== Publications ==
=== Books ===
- 1986 : Poetical Pursuit of Food: Japanese recipes for American Cooks ISBN 9780517556535 - as Sonoko Kondo
- 2016 : Rice Craft: Yummy! Healthy! Fun to Make! ISBN 9781452142876
- 2019 : Japanese Home Cooking: Simple Meals, Authentic Flavors ISBN 978-1611806168
