= Wangan Taiyōzoku =

1987 single by Yōko Oginome

Single by Yōko Oginome

from the album Route 246 Connexion
- Language: Japanese
- English title: Bayshore Route Sun Tribe
- B-side: "Konayuki no Resort"
- Released: March 3, 1987
- Recorded: 1986
- Genre: J-pop; dance-pop
- Length: 3:38
- Label: Victor
- Songwriters: Masao Urino; Minoru Yamazaki
- Producer: Masao Urino

Yōko Oginome singles chronology
"Roppongi Junjōha" (1986)	"Wangan Taiyōzoku" (1987)	"Sayonara no Kajitsutachi" (1987)

Music video
- "Wangan Taiyōzoku" on YouTube

"Wangan Taiyōzoku" (湾岸太陽族; lit. "Bayshore Route Sun Tribe") is the 11th single by Japanese singer Yōko Oginome. Written by Masao Urino and Minoru Yamazaki, the single was released on March 3, 1987 by Victor Entertainment. The song references the Shuto Expressway Bayshore Route (湾岸線, Wangan-sen).

== Background and release ==
Like her previous single "Roppongi Junjōha", "Wangan Taiyōzoku" peaked at No. 3 on Oricon's singles chart, making it Oginome's highest-charting single until "Sayonara no Kajitsutachi" hit No. 1 later that year. It also sold over 162,000 copies.

The B-side, "Konayuki no Resort", was used as an image song for Morinaga High Crown Chocolate.

== Track listing ==
All lyrics are written by Masao Urino.

1987 single
No.	Title	Music	Arrangement	Length
1.	"Wangan Taiyōzoku" ((湾岸太陽族; "Bayshore Route Sun Tribe"))	Minoru Yamazaki	Akira Nishihira	3:38
2.	"Konayuki no Resort" (Konayuki no Rizōto (粉雪のリゾート; "Powdered Snow Resort"))	Tetsuya Furumoto	Nishihira	4:20

2013 bonus tracks
No.	Title	Length
3.	"Wangan Taiyōzoku (Original Karaoke)" (Wangan Taiyōzoku (Orijinaru Karaoke) (湾岸太陽族 (オリジナル・カラオケ)))
4.	"Konayuki no Resort (Original Karaoke)" (Konayuki no Rizōto (Orijinaru Karaoke) (粉雪のリゾート (オリジナル・カラオケ)))

== Charts ==
Weekly charts

Chart (1987)	Peak position
Oricon Weekly Singles Chart	3
The Best Ten	6

Year-end charts

Chart (1987)	Peak position
Oricon Year-End Chart	44
The Best Ten Year-End Chart	51

== See also ==
- 1987 in Japanese music
