= Steal Your Love =

1992 single by Yōko Oginome

Single by Yōko Oginome

from the album Ryūkō Kashu
- Language: Japanese
- B-side: "Moonlight Blue"
- Released: March 27, 1992
- Recorded: 1991
- Genre: J-pop; dance-pop; pop rock
- Label: Victor
- Songwriters: Reo Mikami; Satoshi Hirose
- Producer: Keisuke Tsukimitsu

Yōko Oginome singles chronology
| "Nee" (1991) | "Steal Your Love" (1992) | "Coffee Rumba" (1992) |

Music video
- "Steal Your Love" on YouTube

"Steal Your Love" (スティール・ユア・ラヴ, Sutīru Yua Ravu) is the 24th single by Japanese singer Yōko Oginome. Written by Reo Mikami and Satoshi Hirose, the single was released on March 27, 1992, by Victor Entertainment.

== Background and release ==
The song was used by Ginza Jewelry for their Camelia Diamond commercial.

The B-side is "Moonlight Blue", which is completely different from the similarly titled song from Oginome's 1991 album Trust Me.

"Steal Your Love" peaked at No. 15 on Oricon's singles chart and sold over 129,000 copies.

Oginome re-recorded the song in her 2014 cover album Dear Pop Singer.

== Track listing ==
All music is arranged by Yukio Sugai, Kōichi Kaminaga, and Ryujin Inoue.

| No. | Title | Lyrics | Music | Length |
|---|---|---|---|---|
| 1. | "Steal Your Love" | Reo Mikami | Satoshi Hirose |
| 2. | "Moonlight Blue" | Miyuki Asano | Joey Carbone |
| 3. | "Steal Your Love (Original Karaoke)" ((STEAL YOUR LOVE(オリジナル・カラオケ))) |
| 4. | "Moonlight Blue (Original Karaoke)" ((MOONLIGHT BLUE(オリジナル・カラオケ))) |

== Charts ==
| Chart (1992) | Peak position |
|---|---|
| Oricon Weekly Singles Chart | 15 |
