= Sonoko Kawai =

Japanese singer

- Born: Sonoko Kawai (河合その子); June 20, 1965 (age 61); Chita, Aichi, Japan
- Genres: J-pop, Kayōkyoku
- Occupation: Singer
- Years active: 1985–1990, 2010
- Label: CBS Sony

Sonoko Kawai (河合その子, Kawai Sonoko; born June 20, 1965), married name Sonoko Gotō (後藤その子, Gotō Sonoko), is a former Japanese singer. She was originally member number 12 of Onyanko Club.

== History ==
=== Biography ===
Kawai was born and raised in Chita, Aichi. She attended high school at Nihon Fukushi University Affiliated High School (日本福祉大学付属高等学校, Nihon Fukushi Daigaku Fuzoku Kōtō Gakkō). She first entered the entertainment business in 1983 after winning second place in CBS Sony's Teens Pop Contest. However, her activities with the label were few, and after graduating high school, she continued her studies at a computer-oriented vocational school.

In 1985, she auditioned for Onyanko Club in their show Yūyake Nyan Nyan ("Sunset Meow Meow") (夕やけニャンニャン), and was chosen to be a part of the group. Nicknamed the "eternally young girl" (永遠の少女, eien no shōjo), she immediately gained great popularity which led to her participation in various dramas such as Sukeban Deka. She made her solo debut the same year, with the single "Namida no Jasmine LOVE", making her the first Onyanko Club member to launch a solo career. Her first album followed a few months later. In 1986, she released "Aoi Stasion", which stayed at the No. 1 place on the Oricon charts for two consecutive weeks, making it Kawai's signature song. In April, she graduated from Onyanko Club at the Nippon Budōkan venue of their first concert tour and officially became a solo artist. She would later become one of the hosts of Yūyake Nyan Nyan's sister show, Yūshoku Nyan Nyan ("Dinner Meow Meow") (夕食ニャンニャン).

In 1988, she decided to stop making television appearances, opting to promote her newest material on the radio or live events instead. She also started to work with a varied lineup of producers, showing more maturity in her work, which culminated in her composing four songs on her album Dancin' In The Light, released the following year. In 1990, she released what would be her final album, Replica, in which all the tracks were composed by Kawai herself. After the promotional tour for the album, she announced the dissolution of her fanclub and her temporary retirement from music. After a long absence from the media after her marriage, in the year 2000 she appeared on a single scene of an episode of the television drama Tajū Jinkaku Tantei Psycho (多重人格探偵サイコ). Ten years later, in 2010, she teamed up with fellow 80s idols Yōko Oginome, Hidemi Ishikawa (石川秀美, Ishikawa Hidemi) and Tsukasa Itō (伊藤つかさ, Itō Tsukasa) for a promotional campaign for the cosmetics brand Shiseido.

=== Personal life ===
In 1994, she married Tsugutoshi Gotō, who had composed a big part of her songs. She adopted his surname, though she still uses Kawai as her artist name. In a press conference in 2010, it was revealed that she and Gotō have a child.

== Discography ==
=== Singles ===
List of singles, with selected chart positions
Year	Single	Peak chart positions	Formats
Year	Single	JPN Physical	Formats
1985	"Namida no Jasmine LOVE" （涙の茉莉花LOVE）	1	CD, LP, Cassette, digital download, streaming
1985	"Ochiba no Crescendo" （落葉のクレッシェンド）	2	CD, LP, Cassette, digital download, streaming
1986	"Aoi Stasion" （青いスタスィオン）	1	CD, LP, Cassette, digital download, streaming
1986	"Saikai no Labyrinth" （再会のラビリンス）	1	CD, LP, Cassette, digital download, streaming
1986	"Kanashii Yoru wo Tomete" （悲しい夜を止めて）	1	CD, LP, Cassette, digital download, streaming
1987	"Aishū no Carnaval" （哀愁のカルナバル）	3	CD, LP, Cassette, digital download, streaming
1987	"Jessy"	3	CD, LP, Cassette, digital download, streaming
1987	"Yume kara Sameta Tenshi" (夢から醒めた天使)	11	CD, LP, Cassette, digital download, streaming
1988	"Ame no Memorandum" （雨のメモランダム）	29	CD, LP, Cassette, digital download, streaming

=== Studio albums ===
List of albums, with selected chart positions
Title	Album details	Peak positions
Title	Album details	JPN Oricon
Sonoko	Released: November 5, 1985; Label: CBS-Sony; Formats: CD, LP, Cassette tape, digital download, streaming	4
Siesta	Released: May 21, 1986; Label: CBS-Sony; Formats: CD, LP, Cassette tape, digital download, streaming	1
Mode de Sonoko	Released: October 1, 1986; Label: CBS-Sony; Formats: CD, LP, Cassette tape, digital download, streaming	1
Rouge et Bleu	Released: July 22, 1987; Label: CBS-Sony; Formats: CD, LP, Cassette tape, digital download, streaming	6
Colors	Released: May 21, 1988; Label: CBS-Sony; Formats: CD, LP, Cassette tape, digital download, streaming	19
Dancin' In The Light	Released: March 21, 1989; Label: CBS-Sony; Formats: CD, LP, Cassette tape, digital download, streaming	38
Replica	Released: April 21, 1990; Label: CBS-Sony; Formats: CD, Cassette tape, digital download, streaming	50

=== Compilation albums ===
List of albums, with selected chart positions
Title	Album details	Peak positions
Title	Album details	JPN Oricon
Dedication	Released: January 1, 1988; Label: CBS-Sony; Formats: CD, LP, Cassette tape, digital download, streaming	15
Ame no Ki	Released: July 21, 1988; Label: CBS-Sony; Formats: CD, digital download, streaming	-
Sonnet	Released: December 21, 1990; Label: CBS-Sony; Formats: CD, digital download, streaming	83
Kawai Sonoko Best Collection	Released: July 21, 1997; Label: CBS-Sony; Formats: CD, digital download, streaming	-
Golden Best Kawai Sonoko	Released: November 20, 2002; Label: CBS-Sony; Formats: CD, digital download, streaming	-
"—" denotes items which did not chart

=== Video releases ===
List of albums, with selected chart positions
Title	Album details	Peak positions
Title	Album details	JPN Oricon
Sonoko Genki desu. Kawai Sonoko First Concert	Released: March 21, 1986; Label: CBS-Sony; Formats: VHS, LD, DVD	-
Aphrodite no Yume	Released: March 5, 1987; Label: CBS-Sony; Formats: VHS, LD	-
Sonoko no Natsu	Released: November 21, 1987; Label: CBS-Sony; Formats: VHS, LD, DVD	-
Jessy	Released: March 5, 1988; Label: CBS-Sony; Formats: CDV	-
Sweet Contrast	Released: July 21, 1989; Label: CBS-Sony; Formats: VHS, LD	-
"—" denotes items which did not chart

=== Box-set ===
List of albums, with selected chart positions
Title	Album details	Peak positions
Title	Album details	JPN Oricon
Kawai Sonoko Complete DVD-Box	Released: February 21, 2007; Label: CBS-Sony; Formats: 5DVD	-
Kawai Sonoko Premium	Released: September 30, 2009; Label: CBS-Sony; Formats: 10CD	138
"—" denotes items which did not chart

== Television appearances ==
=== Dramas ===
- Sukeban Deka (1985)
- Janus no Kagami (ヤヌスの鏡) (1985–1986)
- Getsuyō Drama Land (月曜ドラマランド): "Tōmei Shōjo" (1986)
- Hatachi no Matsuri (1986)
- Getsuyō Drama Land: "Miyuki" (1986)
- Ore no Musuko wa Genkijirushi (オレの息子は元気印) (1987)

=== Variety shows ===
- Yūyake Nyan Nyan("Sunset Meow Meow") (夕やけニャンニャン) (1985–1986)
- Yūshoku Nyan Nyan("Dinner Meow Meow") (夕食ニャンニャン) (1986)
