= Kokoro no Mama ni (I'm Just a Lady) =

1985 single by Yōko Oginome

Single by Yōko Oginome

from the album Kaigara Terrace
- Language: Japanese
- English title: As You Please (I'm Just a Lady)
- B-side: "Sweet Vacation"
- Released: August 5, 1985
- Recorded: 1985
- Genre: J-pop; kayōkyoku; teen pop
- Length: 4:19
- Label: Victor
- Songwriter: Mai Arai

Yōko Oginome singles chronology
"Koishite Caribbean" (1985)	"Kokoro no Mama ni (I'm Just a Lady)" (1985)	"Dancing Hero (Eat You Up)" (1985)

Music video
- "Kokoro no Mama ni (I'm Just a Lady)" on YouTube

"Kokoro no Mama ni (I'm Just a Lady)" (心のままに〜I'm just a lady〜; lit. "As You Please (I'm Just a Lady)") is the sixth single by Japanese singer Yōko Oginome. Written by Mai Arai, the single was released on August 5, 1985 by Victor Entertainment.

== Background and release ==
The song was used in the TBS drama special Ai no Gekijō: Wagako yo V (愛の劇場・わが子よV; Love Theater: My Child V). The B-side, "Sweet Vacation", was used by the Japan Ministry of Posts and Telecommunications for their "Summer Greetings" campaign.

The music video features Oginome doing different activities in New York City, from jogging in Central Park to exercising at a dance studio in Manhattan.

"Kokoro no Mama ni (I'm Just a Lady)" peaked at No. 16 on Oricon's singles chart and sold over 68,000 copies.

Oginome re-recorded the song with a synth-pop arrangement for her 1987 greatest hits album Pop Groover: The Best.

== Track listing ==
1985 single
No.	Title	Lyrics	Music	Arrangement	Length
1.	"Kokoro no Mama ni (I'm Just a Lady)" ((心のままに〜I'm just a lady〜; lit. "As You Please (I'm Just a Lady)"))	Mai Arai	Arai	Mitsuo Hagita	4:19
2.	"Sweet Vacation" (Suīto Vakēshon (スイート・ヴァケーション))	Yasushi Akimoto	Hideya Nakazaki	Nakazaki	3:16

2013 bonus tracks
No.	Title	Length
3.	"Kokoro no Mama ni (I'm Just a Lady) (Original Karaoke)" ((心のままに〜I'm just a lady〜 (オリジナル・カラオケ); lit. "As You Please (I'm Just a Lady) (Original Karaoke)"))
4.	"Sweet Vacation (Original Karaoke)" ((スイート・ヴァケーション (オリジナル・カラオケ)))

== Charts ==
Chart (1985)	Peak position
Oricon Weekly Singles Chart	16

== See also ==
- 1985 in Japanese music
