= Tokyo Summer Festival =

The annual Tokyo Summer Festival, organized by the Arion-Edo Foundation in cooperation with Asahi Shimbun, has been thought up in 1985 by Kyoko Edo (pianist), Maki Ishii (composer) and Tashi Funayama (musicologist), who joined hands to plan a truly international music festival in Tokyo at a time when there was no such event in Japan. This epoch-making festival is the first in Japan planned and directed by professional musicians. The festival takes place under a different theme each year and invites outstanding artists from all around the world in order to let the public discover various styles of music, from classical to world music. Many of the participating artists perform for the 1st time in Japan.

== Festivals in the past ==
1985: Music, Exoticism and Orientalism - The Maturity and Transformation of Occidental Music-

1986: Pan-nationalist Music - Focusing on Russian/Soviet Music

1987: Creation and Performance- Beyond Ethnicity Focusing on the Music of the U.S.A.

1988: Paris - Paris

1989: German Romanticism - Development and Countermovement - Dawn for Berlin

1990: The Gypsies and European Music

1991: Sound Across the Continents and Oceans - Music from Abroad and the Culture of Japan

1992: Italy - well-spring of voice and sound -

1993: Visions of India

1994: Transformation and New Perspectives

1995: Patterns of Laughter - Masques, Music, and Buffoonery -

1996: The Harmony of the Spheres I: The Woman Ascending

1997: The Harmony of the Spheres II: Myths and Legends

1998: The Ballets Russes of Diaghilev and the Twentieth Century - Provocateur in Arts -

1999: Performance: Art and Artistry

2000: Camera! Action! Music! (Music and Cinema)

2001: Voices

2002: Music and Literature

2003: Ritual, Nature, and Music

2004: The 20th Anniversary of the Tokyo Summer Festival

2005: Cosmos, Music, and Heart

2006: Songs of the Earth / Music in the Streets

2007: Towards the Islands - Sounds across the Sea

2008: Forest Echoes / Desert Voices

== 24th Tokyo Summer Festival 2008: Forest Echoes / Desert Voices ==
「森の響き・砂漠の声」

Forest – filled with vitality, spirits and shrubs since all times, graceful spots unreachable by daylight, a habitat for humans and spirits. Obscure and mysterious places in the midst of forests are an abundant source of energetic sounds. Desert – although life withers on the arid soil, great civilizations have made the desert their home for thousands of years. The silence of the desert sharpens mind and ears of its inhabitants and creates strong and colorful music. At a first glance deserts and forests are completely opposite places, but on a global scale they are closely linked by the hydrologic cycle. This year's Tokyo Summer Festival takes you to a musical journey through noisy forests and silent deserts. Performers: Egberto Gismonti, Tokyo Philharmonic Orchestra, Ryusuke Numajiri, Algerian Tuareg musicians, Karaja Indians, Toshita Kagura Preservation Association, Shota Nakano, Fumiko Nomura,...

== 23rd Tokyo Summer Festival 2007: Towards the Islands - Sounds across the Sea ==
「島へ - 海を渡る音」 Since ancient times, islands floating all over the world's oceans and seas have been the passage route for traders, explorers and travelers. With the coming and going of the peoples, traces of different cultures also passed by the islands that became an encounter place where native and overseas cultures blend together. This year's 23rd Tokyo Summer Festival is rowing through space and time to portray the musical mosaic of various islands from around the globe. Musicians performing at the 23rd Tokyo Summer Festival: Dan Ettinger, Shota Nakano, Tokyo Philharmonic Orchestra, Johann Johannsson, Fujiko Nakaya, Frisner Augustin and La Troupe Makandal, Music Cultural Club, Bi Kidude, Vicente Feliu, Lazaro Garcia, Augusto Blanca, and many more!
