= Sonoko (album) =

Sonoko (その子)

Studio album by Sonoko Kawai
- Released: December 5, 1985
- Genre: Pop, Kayōkyoku
- Language: Japanese
- Label: CBS Sony

Sonoko Kawai chronology
Sonoko (その子) (1985)	Siesta (1986)

Sonoko (その子) is Japanese pop singer Sonoko Kawai's debut studio album. It was released on December 5, 1985, through CBS Sony in LP, cassette and CD versions. It peaked at number four on the Oricon charts and sold 173,000 copies.

== Overview ==
The album includes the title track from Kawai's debut single "Namida no Jasmine LOVE" and its B-side "Koi no Chapter A to Z", as well as the B-side to her second single "Ochiba no Crescendo", "Gogo no Pas de Deux".

== Track listing ==
All tracks composed and arranged by Tsugutoshi Gotō.
Vocals on tracks 3, 6, 7 & 8 are credited to Sonoko Kawai with Onyanko Club (河合その子 with おニャン子クラブ).

No.	Title	Lyrics	Length
1.	"Gogo no Pas de Deux" (午後のパドドゥ)	Rui Serizawa	3:29
2.	"Nagisa no Tightrope" (渚のタイトロープ)	Yasushi Akimoto	3:04
3.	"Koi no Chapter A to Z" (恋のチャプターA to Z)	Takemi Shima	3:29
4.	"Midori no Poinsettia" (緑のポインセチア)	Rui Serizawa	5:26
5.	"Namida no Jasmine LOVE" (涙の茉莉花(ジャスミン)LOVE)	T2 (Tatsufumi Inaba & Tsugutoshi Gotō)	4:03
6.	"Sayonara Natsu no Lycée" (さよなら夏のリセ)	Rui Serizawa	4:30
7.	"Koi no College Ring" (恋のカレッジ・リング)	Yasushi Akimoto	3:46
8.	"Mukou DE Garçon" (向うDEギャルソン)	Takemi Shima	3:54
9.	"Please tell me Mr. Shu" (Please tell me Mr.朱)	Yasushi Akimoto	4:10
10.	"Watashi no Suki na Catherine" (私の好きなキャサリン)	Kazuko Kobayashi	3:40

== See also ==
- 1985 in Japanese music
