= Koishite Caribbean =

1985 single by Yōko Oginome

Single by Yōko Oginome

from the album Kaigara Terrace
- Language: Japanese
- English title: Love in the Caribbean
- B-side: "Ai no Time Capsule"
- Released: May 21, 1985
- Recorded: 1985
- Genre: J-pop; kayōkyoku; teen pop
- Length: 3:50
- Label: Victor
- Songwriters: Gorō Matsui; Hideya Nakazaki

Yōko Oginome singles chronology
"Mukokuseki Romance" (1985)	"Koishite Caribbean" (1985)	"Kokoro no Mama ni (I'm Just a Lady)" (1985)

Music video
- "Koishite Caribbean" on YouTube

"Koishite Caribbean" (恋してカリビアン, Koishite Karibian; lit. "Love in the Caribbean") is the fifth single by Japanese singer Yōko Oginome. Written by Gorō Matsui and Hideya Nakazaki, the single was released on May 21, 1985 by Victor Entertainment.

== Background and release ==
The song was used by Kao Corporation for their Biore U skincare commercial shot in Guam and featuring Oginome. It was also featured in the Fuji TV drama special Mōretsu Atarō (もーれつア太郎), which also starred Oginome. Following its release, "Koishite Caribbean" was used as a sports cheering theme by Saitama Seibu Lions player Koji Akiyama, Cerezo Osaka player Hiroaki Morishima, Urawa Red Diamonds player Kenji Oshiba, and Omiya Ardija player Ariajasuru Hasegawa.

The B-side, "Ai no Time Capsule", was the image song of the 60th anniversary of NHK Osaka.

"Koishite Caribbean" peaked at No. 24 on Oricon's singles chart and sold over 66,000 copies.

Oginome re-recorded the song with a synth-pop arrangement for her 1987 greatest hits album Pop Groover: The Best.

== Track listing ==
1985 single
No.	Title	Lyrics	Music	Arrangement	Length
1.	"Koishite Caribbean" (Koishite Karibian (恋してカリビアン; lit. "Love in the Caribbean"))	Gorō Matsui	Hideya Nakazaki	Nakazaki	3:50
2.	"Ai no Time Capsule" (Ai no Taimu Kapuseru (愛のタイムカプセル; lit. "Love Time Capsule"))	Yasushi Akimoto	Motoki Funayama	Funayama	2:54

2013 bonus tracks
No.	Title	Length
3.	"Koishite Caribbean (Original Karaoke)" ((恋してカリビアン (オリジナル・カラオケ); lit. "Love in the Caribbean (Original Karaoke)"))
4.	"Ai no Time Capsule (Original Karaoke)" ((愛のタイムカプセル (オリジナル・カラオケ); lit. "Love Time Capsule (Original Karaoke)"))

== Charts ==
Chart (1985)	Peak position
Oricon Weekly Singles Chart	24

== See also ==
- 1985 in Japanese music
