= Ryūkō Kashu =

Studio album by Yōko Oginome
- Released: June 3, 1992
- Recorded: 1991–1992
- Genre: J-pop; dance-pop
- Length: 52:27
- Language: Japanese
- Label: Victor
- Producer: Keisuke Tsukimitsu

Yōko Oginome chronology
New Take: Best Collections '92 (1991)	Ryūkō Kashu (1992)	Nudist (1992)

Singles from Ryūkō Kashu
- 1. "Nee" Released: December 16, 1991; 2. "Steal Your Love" Released: March 27, 1992; 3. "Coffee Rumba" Released: May 8, 1992; 4. "Romantic ni Aishite" Released: July 1, 1992

Ryūkō Kashu (流行歌手; lit. Trendy Singer) is the 13th studio album by Japanese singer/songwriter Yōko Oginome. Released through Victor Entertainment on June 3, 1992, the album was produced by Keisuke Tsukimitsu and features the hit singles "Nee", "Steal Your Love", and a cover of "Coffee Rumba". It also marked Oginome's debut as a songwriter, having written the lyrics to two songs in the album. The album was reissued on May 26, 2010 with four bonus tracks as part of Oginome's 25th anniversary celebration.

The album peaked at No. 3 on Oricon's albums chart, becoming her last top-10 album. It also sold over 165,000 copies.

== Track listing ==
All tracks are arranged by Yukio Sugai, Kōichi Kaminaga, and Ryujin Inoue, except where indicated.

No.	Title	Lyrics	Music	Length
1.	"This Is Pop"	Reo Mikami	Warren Bacall	4:11
2.	"Nee (Album Version)" (Nē (Arubamu Vājon) (ねえ（アルバム・ヴァージョン）; "Hey" (Album Version)))	Mikami	Tadashi Ishikawa	5:12
3.	"Romantic ni Aishite" (Romantikku ni Aishite (ロマンティックに愛して; "I Love You Romantically"))	Miyuki Asano	Juichi Morishige	3:50
4.	"Steal Your Love"	Mikami	Satoshi Hirose	4:23
5.	"Anata ni Kaeritai" ((あなたに帰りたい; "I Want to Go Back to You"))	Asano	Inoue	3:56
6.	"Coffee Rumba" (Kōhī Runba (コーヒー・ルンバ))	Seiji Nakazawa	José Manzo Perroni	4:36
7.	"Sasayaka na Resistance" ((ささやかなレジスタンス; Sasayaka na Rejisutansu) "A Modest Resistance")	Asano	Inoue	4:11
8.	"Hitorijime" ((独り占め; "Monopoly"))	YOKO	Sugai	4:30
9.	"Kare no Sainan" ((彼の災難; "His Calamity"))	Asano	Tomohisa Kawazoe	3:45
10.	"Starship"	Ishikawa	Tarō Fukada	5:55
11.	"Playboy" (Purei Bōi (プレイ・ボーイ))	YOKO	Nobuhiko Satō	3:40
12.	"Moonlight Blue"	Asano	Joey Carbone	4:13
Total length:				52:27

2010 bonus tracks
No.	Title	Lyrics	Music	Arrangement	Length
13.	"Nee (Single Version)" (Nē (Shinguru Vājon) (ねえ（シングル・ヴァージョン）; "Hey" (Single Version)))	Mikami	Ishikawa		4:38
14.	"This Is Pop (Club Mix)"	Mikami	Bacall		6:43
15.	"Nee (Club Mix)" (Nē (Kurabu Mikkusu) (ねえ（Club Mix）; "Hey" (Club Mix)))	Mikami	Ishikawa		8:52
16.	"Bijo to Yajū (Club Mix)" (Bijo to Yajū (Kurabu Mikkusu) (美女と野獣（Club Mix）; "Beauty and the Beast" (Club Mix)))	Masumi Kawamura	Toshinobu Kubota	Yōichirō Kakizaki; Kōji Nakamura	6:05
Total length:					26:20

== Personnel ==
- Hitoshi Takaba – keyboards
- Kōichi Kaminaga – guitar
- Yukio Sugai – bass, drums
- Yumi Murata – backing vocals

== Charts ==
Chart (1992)	Peak position
Japanese Albums (Oricon)	3
