= Sayonara no Kajitsutachi =

1987 single by Yōko Oginome

Single by Yōko Oginome

from the album Route 246 Connexion
- Language: Japanese
- English title: Goodbye Fruits
- B-side: "Loftside Graffiti"
- Released: June 21, 1987
- Recorded: 1987
- Genre: J-pop; kayōkyoku
- Length: 3:42
- Label: Victor
- Composer: Kyōhei Tsutsumi
- Lyricist: Masao Urino
- Producer: Masao Urino

Yōko Oginome singles chronology
"Wangan Taiyōzoku" (1987)	"Sayonara no Kajitsutachi" (1987)	"Kitakaze no Carol" (1987)

Music video
- "Sayonara no Kajitsutachi" on YouTube

"Sayonara no Kajitsutachi" (さよならの果実たち; lit. "Goodbye Fruits") is the 12th single by Japanese singer Yōko Oginome. Composed by Kyōhei Tsutsumi with lyrics by Masao Urino, the single was released on June 21, 1987 by Victor Entertainment.

== Background and release ==
"Sayonara no Kajitsutachi" became Oginome's first No. 1 single on Oricon's singles chart. It also sold over 161,000 copies. In addition, the single earned Oginome the Best Talent Award at the 13th All Japan Song Music Festival.

The music video begins with Oginome being forced into a yellow bus filled with an unruly crowd of American passengers dressed as punks. Once she steps out of the bus, she proceeds to sing while the crowd dances behind her.

== Track listing ==
All lyrics are written by Masao Urino; all music is composed by Kyōhei Tsutsumi.

1987 single
No.	Title	Arrangement	Length
1.	"Sayonara no Kajitsutachi" ((さよならの果実たち; "Goodbye Fruits"))	Satoshi Takebe	3:42
2.	"Loftside Graffiti" (Rofutosaido Gurafiti (ロフトサイド・グラフィティ))	Hiroshi Shinkawa	4:08

2013 bonus tracks
No.	Title	Length
3.	"Sayonara no Kajitsutachi (Original Karaoke)" (Sayonara no Kajitsutachi (Orijinaru Karaoke) (さよならの果実たち (オリジナル・カラオケ)))
4.	"Loftside Grafitti (Original Karaoke)" (Rofutosaido Gurafiti (Orijinaru Karaoke) (ロフトサイド・グラフィティ (オリジナル・カラオケ)))

== Charts ==
Weekly charts

Chart (1987)	Peak position
Oricon Weekly Singles Chart	1
The Best Ten	5

Year-end charts

Chart (1987)	Peak position
Oricon Year-End Chart	45
The Best Ten Year-End Chart	52

== Cover versions ==
- Kishidan covered the song in the 2021 Kyōhei Tsutsumi tribute album Oneway Generation.

== See also ==
- 1987 in Japanese music
