= Sayonara kara Hajimaru Monogatari =

1984 single by Yōko Oginome

Single by Yōko Oginome

from the album Teens Romance
- Language: Japanese
- English title: A Story That Begins with a Goodbye
- B-side: "Natsu no Hohoemi"
- Released: July 21, 1984
- Recorded: 1984
- Genre: J-pop; kayōkyoku; teen pop
- Length: 3:16
- Label: Victor
- Songwriters: Chinfa Kan; Tetsuya Furumoto

Yōko Oginome singles chronology
| "Mirai Kōkai (Sailing)" (1984) | "Sayonara kara Hajimaru Monogatari" (1984) | "December Memory" (1984) |

Music video
- "Sayonara kara Hajimaru Monogatari" on YouTube

"Sayonara kara Hajimaru Monogatari" (さよならから始まる物語; lit. "A Story That Begins with a Goodbye") is the second single by Japanese singer Yōko Oginome. Written by Chinfa Kan and Tetsuya Furumoto, the single was released on July 21, 1984 by Victor Entertainment.

== Background and release ==
The music video features Oginome as a young mechanic at an Esso gas station. Towards the end of the video, as she is working on a car, an American man approaches her. She thinks he will ask her out on a date, but is disappointed when he asks her to fuel his car.

The B-side, "Natsu no Hohoemi", was used as the ending theme of the Fuji TV drama special Gendai Fūfu Jijō 2: Tasogare nante kowakunai! (現代夫婦事情2〜たそがれなんて怖くない!〜; Modern Marital Circumstances 2: I'm not afraid of twilight!), which also starred Oginome.

"Sayonara kara Hajimaru Monogatari" peaked at No. 29 on Oricon's singles chart and sold over 44,000 copies. It earned Oginome the Excellent Newcomer Award at the 12th KBC Newcomer Song Festival, the Silver Award at the 14th Ginza Music Festival, the Silver Award at the 17th Shinjuku Music Festival, the New Face Award at the 11th Yokohama Music Festival, the Silver Award at the 10th All-Japan Kayo Music Festival, and the Outstanding Rookie Award at the 13th FNS Music Festival.

Oginome re-recorded the song with a synth-pop arrangement for her 1987 greatest hits album Pop Groover: The Best.

== Track listing ==
1984 single
| No. | Title | Lyrics | Music | Arrangement | Length |
|---|---|---|---|---|---|
| 1. | "Sayonara kara Hajimaru Monogatari" ((さよならから始まる物語; lit. "A Story That Begins with a Goodbye")) | Chinfa Kan | Tetsuya Furumoto | Mitsuo Hagita | 3:16 |
| 2. | "Natsu no Hohoemi" ((夏の微笑; lit. "Summer Smile")) | Yoshiko Miura | Yayoi Tanaka | Makoto Matsushita | 5:00 |

2013 bonus tracks
| No. | Title | Length |
|---|---|---|
| 3. | "Sayonara kara Hajimaru Monogatari (Original Karaoke)" ((さよならから始まる物語 (オリジナル・カラオケ); lit. "A Story That Begins with a Goodbye (Original Karaoke)")) |
| 4. | "Natsu no Bishō (Original Karaoke)" ((夏の微笑 (オリジナル・カラオケ); lit. "Summer Smile (Original Karaoke)")) |

== Charts ==
| Chart (1984) | Peak position |
|---|---|
| Oricon Weekly Singles Chart | 29 |

== See also ==
- 1984 in Japanese music
