= Coffee Rumba =

1961 single by Sachiko Nishida

Single by Sachiko Nishida
- Language: Japanese
- A-side: "Yokubō no Blues"
- Released: August 1961
- Recorded: 1961
- Genre: Kayōkyoku
- Label: Polydor Records
- Songwriters: José Manzo Perroni; Seiji Nakazawa

Sachiko Nishida singles chronology
"Acacia no Ame ga Yamu Toki/Yogiri no Terebi-tō" (1960)	"Coffee Rumba" / "Yokubō no Blues" (1961)	"Keiji Monogatari" (1961)

Alternative cover
- 2001 maxi-single cover

"Coffee Rumba" (コーヒー・ルンバ, Kōhī Runba) is a song by Japanese singer Sachiko Nishida, released as the double A-side of her second single "Yokubō no Blues" by Polydor Records in August 1961. It is a Japanese-language cover of the Venezuelan song "Moliendo Café".

== Background and release ==
Originally written by José Manzo Perroni, "Moliendo Café" was first adapted to Japanese by Seiji Nakazawa and recorded by Sachiko Nishida in 1961. Nishida performed the song on the 12th NHK Kōhaku Uta Gassen that year.

"Coffee Rumba" was reissued in November 1975; this time with "Yokubō no Blues" as the B-side. The song was re-released as a CD maxi-single by Polydor on March 7, 2001 to celebrate its 40th anniversary.

== Track listing ==
1961 single
No.	Title	Lyrics	Music	Arrangement	Length
1.	"Yokubō no Blues" (Yokubō no Burūsu (欲望のブルース; lit. "Blues of Desire"))	Seiji Nakazawa	Peter Moesser	Yoshihiko Kawakami
2.	"Coffee Rumba" (Kōhī Runba (コーヒー・ルンバ))	Nakazawa	José Manzo Perroni	Kawakami

1975 single
No.	Title	Lyrics	Music	Arrangement	Length
1.	"Coffee Rumba"	Nakazawa	Perroni	Kawakami
2.	"Yokubō no Blues"	Nakazawa	Peter Moesser	Kawakami

2001 maxi-single
No.	Title	Lyrics	Music	Arrangement	Length
1.	"Coffee Rumba"	Nakazawa	Perroni	Kawakami
2.	"Kurenai Hotel" (Kurenai Hoteru (くれないホテル; lit. "The Hotel That Can't Be Lost"))	Jun Hashima	Kyōhei Tsutsumi	Tsutsumi
3.	"Hajimete no Machi de" ((初めての街で; lit. "In the City for the First Time"))	Rokusuke Ei	Hachidai Nakamura	Akira Inoue
4.	"Acacia no Ame ga Yamu Toki" (Akashia no Ame ga Yamu Toki (アカシアの雨がやむとき; lit. "When the Acacia Rain Stops Falling"))	Kaoru Mizuki	Hideyuki Fujiwara	Fujiwara

== Yōko Oginome version ==
"Coffee Rumba"

Single by YO+CO

from the album Ryūkō Kashu
- Language: Japanese
- B-side: "Starship"
- Released: May 8, 1992
- Recorded: 1992
- Genre: J-pop; dance-pop
- Length: 4:39
- Label: Victor
- Songwriters: José Manzo Perroni; Seiji Nakazawa
- Producer: Keisuke Tsukimitsu

YO+CO singles chronology
"Steal Your Love" (1992)	"Coffee Rumba" (1992)	"Romantic ni Aishite" (1992)

Music video
- "Coffee Rumba" on YouTube

"Coffee Rumba" was covered by Yōko Oginome (under the pseudonym "YO+CO") as her 25th single, released on May 8, 1992 by Victor Entertainment. The song was used by DyDo Drinco Inc. for their DyDo Blend Coffee commercial. Oginome was not familiar with the song until DyDo Drinco approached her to record it. The single peaked at No. 35 on Oricon's singles chart and sold over 171,000 copies, becoming her last single to sell over six figures. Oginome performed the song on the 43rd NHK Kōhaku Uta Gassen that year.

In 1993, "Coffee Rumba" replaced "Dancing Hero (Eat You Up)" as the insert song in "Binbō-ka no Hitobito" (貧乏家の人々; "The Poor People"), a recurring sketch segment in the Fuji TV variety show Tonneruzu no Minasan no Okage desu (とんねるずのみなさんのおかげです; The Tunnels' Thanks to Everyone). In the segment, Oginome and the Tunnels (Takaaki Ishibashi and Noritake Kinashi) would dance to the first verse of the song before ending with the line "Let's dance".

Oginome re-recorded the song in her 2014 cover album Dear Pop Singer.

=== Track listing ===
All music is arranged by Yukio Sugai, Kōichi Kaminaga, and Ryujin Inoue.

No.	Title	Lyrics	Music	Length
1.	"Coffee Rumba" (Kōhī Runba (コーヒー・ルンバ))	Seiji Nakazawa	José Manzo Perroni	4:39
2.	"Starship"	Tadashi Ishikawa	Tarō Fukada	5:57
3.	"Coffee Rumba" (Original Karaoke)			4:38
4.	"Starship" (Original Karaoke)			5:58

=== Charts ===
Chart positions for "Coffee Rumba"
Chart (1992)	Peak position
Oricon Weekly Singles Chart	35

== Yōsui Inoue version ==
"Coffee Rumba"

Single by Yōsui Inoue

from the album United Cover
- Language: Japanese
- B-side: "Hoshi no Flamenco: Domino; Tabibito yo"
- Released: January 24, 2001
- Recorded: 2000
- Genre: J-pop
- Label: For Life
- Songwriters: José Manzo Perroni; Seiji Nakazawa

Yōsui Inoue singles chronology
"Teenager" (1998)	"Coffee Rumba" (2001)	"Hana no Kubikazari" (2001)

Yōsui Inoue released his version of "Coffee Rumba" on January 24, 2001 as part of his cover album United Cover. The single peaked at No. 19 on Oricon's singles chart.

=== Track listing ===
No.	Title	Lyrics	Music	Length
1.	"Coffee Rumba" (Kōhī Runba (コーヒー・ルンバ))	Seiji Nakazawa	José Manzo Perroni
2.	"Hoshi no Flamenco" (Hoshi no Furamenko (星のフラメンコ; lit. "Flamenco of the Stars"))	Kuranosuke Hamaguchi	Hamaguchi
3.	"Domino" ((ドミノ))	J. Plante	L. Ferrari
4.	"Tabibito yo" ((旅人よ; lit. "Traveler"))	Tokiko Iwatani	Yūzō Kayama

=== Charts ===
Chart (2001)	Peak position
Oricon Weekly Singles Chart	19

== Other cover versions ==
- The Peanuts covered the song in 1962, but with different lyrics by Takashi Otowa.
- Antonio Kuga recorded two parody versions of the song: "Kusuri Rumba" (1971) and "Kusuri Rumba Part 2" (1982).
- Yuri Ōsawa and Kurumi Kobato recorded the parody song "Māhjong Furotsuki Osake Rumba" in 1978. Michiyo Sako covered this parody version in 1997.
- Izumi Kobayashi covered the song in 1982 for her album Nuts, Nuts, Nuts; it was later included on the 2019 compilation album Pacific Breeze: Japanese City Pop, AOR and Boogie 1976–1986.
- Yuri Kunizane covered the song in 1991.
- Logic System covered the song on their 1992 album Space Polyphony.
- Gorō Tani and Gorō Shō recorded the parody song "Yasai Rumba" in 1993.
- Kobucha Band recorded the parody song "Kobucha Rumba" in 1999.
- Shizuka Kudo covered the song on her 2002 cover album Shōwa no Kaidan Vol. 1.
- Pink Jam Princess covered the song in 2006.
- Tomiko Van covered the song on her 2007 cover album Voice: Cover You with Love.
- Ai Nishida covered the song on her 2019 cover album Island Songs ~Watashi no Suki na Ai no Uta~.
- Jirō Atsumi covered the song on his 2019 album Shin Enka-shi ~Uta to Guitar to Percussion~.

== See also ==
- 1961 in Japanese music
