= Mirai Kōkai (Sailing) =

1984 single by Yōko Oginome

Single by Yōko Oginome

from the album Teens Romance
- Language: Japanese
- English title: Future Voyage (Sailing)
- B-side: "Ryūsei Shōjo"
- Released: April 3, 1984
- Recorded: 1984
- Genre: J-pop; kayōkyoku; teen pop
- Length: 3:15
- Label: Victor
- Songwriters: Hiromi Kanda; Yukiyoshi Shimazu

Yōko Oginome singles chronology
"Mirai Kōkai (Sailing)" (1984)	"Sayonara kara Hajimaru Monogatari" (1984)

Music video
- "Mirai Kōkai (Sailing)" on YouTube

"Mirai Kōkai (Sailing)" (未来航海-Sailing-, Mirai Kōkai -Seiringu-; lit. "Future Voyage (Sailing)") is the debut single by Japanese singer Yōko Oginome. Written by Hiromi Kanda and Yukiyoshi Shimazu, the single was released on April 3, 1984 by Victor Entertainment.

== Background and release ==
After being in the children's music trio Milk from 1979 to 1980 and working as an anime voice actress during the early 1980s, Oginome decided to pursue a solo music career in 1984 with "Mirai Kōkai (Sailing)". Her catchphrase during her debut was "Heart is straight." (ハートは、まっすぐ。, Hāto wa, massugu). She first promoted the single with the fan event "Mirai Kōkai Marine Campaign: Mystery Sailing" (未来航海洋上キャンペーン〜ミステリー・セイリング, Mirai Kōkai Yōjō Kyanpēn 〜 Misuterī Seiringu) in Kurihama, Yokosuka.

The music video features Oginome singing and dancing in a futuristic room decorated with arcade game cabinets. In the beginning of the video, the screen on the background displays her biodata.

"Mirai Kōkai (Sailing)" peaked at No. 32 on Oricon's singles chart and sold over 70,000 copies. It won the Outstanding Rookie Emerald Award at the 3rd Megalopolis Song Festival.

Oginome re-recorded the song with a synth-pop arrangement for her 1987 greatest hits album Pop Groover: The Best.

== Track listing ==
1984 single
No.	Title	Lyrics	Music	Arrangement	Length
1.	"Mirai Kōkai (Sailing)" (Mirai Kōkai -Seiringu- (未来航海-Sailing-; lit. "Future Voyage (Sailing)"))	Hiromi Kanda	Yukiyoshi Shimazu	Mitsuo Hagita	3:15
2.	"Ryūsei Shōjo" ((流星少女; lit. "Meteor Girl"))	Yoko Aki	Yuichirō Oda	Hagita	4:06

2013 bonus tracks
No.	Title	Length
3.	"Mirai Kōkai (Sailing) (Original Karaoke)" (Mirai Kōkai -Seiringu- (Orijinaru Karaoke) (未来航海-Sailing- (オリジナル・カラオケ); lit. "Future Voyage (Sailing) (Original Karaoke)"))
4.	"Ryūsei Shōjo (Original Karaoke)" (Ryūsei Shōjo (Orijinaru Karaoke) (流星少女 (オリジナル・カラオケ); lit. "Meteor Girl (Original Karaoke)"))

== Charts ==
Chart (1984)	Peak position
Oricon Weekly Singles Chart	32

== See also ==
- 1984 in Japanese music
