= Daisuke Inoue (singer) =

Japanese singer, composer and multi-instrumentist (1941–2000)

- 井上大輔
- Born: 13 September 1941; Tokyo, Japan
- Died: 30 May 2000 (aged 58); Tokyo, Japan
- Other name: Tadao Inoue
- Occupations: Singer, composer, songwriter, multi-instrumentalist

Daisuke Inoue (Japanese: 井上大輔; 13 September 1941 - 30 May 2000), the stage name of Tadao Inoue (Japanese: 井上 忠夫) was a Japanese singer, composer, songwriter and multi-instrumentalist.

== Life and career ==
Born in Tokyo, Inoue started his musical career in 1960 as a member of the group Jackey Yoshikawa and His Blue Comets, serving as multi-instrumentalist, vocalist and often also as composer. Among other works, he penned the group's major hit "Blue Chateau" (ブルー・シャトウ, "Burū shatō"), which won a Japan Record Award and sold over one million copies. After the group disbanded, Inoue started a career as a solo singer and as a composer for other artists, notably Finger 5 and Hiromi Go. In 1981, he adopted the stage name Daisuke Inoue to mark a fresh start to his career. Among his major hits is "Ai Senshi", the theme song of the Mobile Suit Gundam film trilogy. He also composed music for commercials, most notably the popular tune "I Feel Coke" for a series of Coca-Cola advertisements in the 1980s and 1990s.

Suffering from a retinal detachment that was not resolved by recent surgery, and with his wife seriously ill, Inoue died by suicide by hanging on 30 May 2000, at the age of 58. His wife took her own life by hanging one year later.
