= Dancing Hero (Eat You Up) =

1985 single by Yōko Oginome

Single by Yōko Oginome

from the album Yōko Oginome: The Best
- Language: Japanese
- B-side: "Zenmaijikake no Suiyōbi"
- Released: November 21, 1985
- Recorded: 1985
- Genre: J-pop; Eurobeat
- Length: 3:49
- Label: Victor
- Songwriters: Hitoshi Shinohara; Angelina Kyte; Anthony Baker
- Producer: Kōji Makaino

Yōko Oginome singles chronology
"Kokoro no Mama ni (I'm Just a Lady)" (1985)	"Dancing Hero (Eat You Up)" (1985)	"Flamingo in Paradise" (1986)

Music video
- "Dancing Hero (Eat You Up)" on YouTube

"Dancing Hero (Eat You Up)" (ダンシング・ヒーロー (Eat You Up), Danshingu Hīrō (Eat You Up)) is the seventh single by Japanese singer Yōko Oginome, released on November 21, 1985 by Victor Entertainment. It is a Japanese-language cover of the 1985 song "Eat You Up" by British singer-songwriter Angie Gold.

== Background and release ==
"Dancing Hero (Eat You Up)" is a cover of the 1985 song "Eat You Up" by British singer-songwriter Angie Gold with Japanese lyrics by Hitoshi Shinohara. The song was originally planned to be titled "Cinderella Boy" (シンデレラ・ボーイ, Shinderera Bōi), but "Dancing Hero" was chosen as the final title by Rising Production's president Tetsuo Taira.

"Dancing Hero (Eat You Up)" was first released in Japan on November 21, 1985 and peaked at No. 5 on Oricon's singles chart, making it Oginome's first top-five single. It also sold over 324,000 copies. The song earned Oginome the Nippon Television Idol Award at the 12th Nippon Television Music Festival, the Best Idol Award at the 12th All Japan Kayo Music Festival, and the Wired Music Award at the 19th Japan Cable Awards. The achievements allowed Oginome to perform on the 37th Kōhaku Uta Gassen in 1986.

The original music video features Oginome wearing a pink wig and dressed in a costume made of origami.

Oginome also recorded an English version of "Dancing Hero (Eat You Up)", with new lyrics by Marco Bruno. This version was first included in her 1986 album Raspberry Wind.

During the late-1980s, the song was used in "Binbō-ka no Hitobito" (貧乏家の人々; "The Poor People"), a recurring sketch segment in the Fuji TV variety show Tonneruzu no Minasan no Okage desu (とんねるずのみなさんのおかげです; The Tunnels' Thanks to Everyone). In the segment, Oginome and the Tunnels (Takaaki Ishibashi and Noritake Kinashi) would dance when the song played; the song would end abruptly with Kinashi singing off-key before being attacked by Ishibashi (and sometimes Oginome). The song was replaced by Oginome's other single "Coffee Rumba" in 1993.

The song resurfaced to public attention in 2017, when the dance club from Tomioka High School in Sakai, Osaka used the song for their routine reworked with Dead or Alive's 1985 song "You Spin Me Round (Like a Record)" and catch phrases from comedian Nora Hirano. During the dance, the students wore costumes paying homage to 1980s fashion. Their routine first gained media interest when they won second place at Dance Stadium, a national high school dance competition, in August, with the choreography named the "bubbly dance" after the economic bubble in Japan during the 1980s. When a video featuring the "bubbly dance" was uploaded onto YouTube, it gained 2.5 million likes within the first two days. The dance routine renewed interest in "Dancing Hero (Eat You Up)", and Oginome praised Tomioka Dance Club. Oginome and the Tomioka Dance Club received the Special Award at the 59th Japan Record Awards that year.

On November 8, 2017, Oginome released the digital single "Dancing Hero: All Eat You Up", which contains all versions of the song she had recorded over the past 30 years. It peaked at No. 2 on the Billboard Japan Hot 100. In addition, the digital single was certified Gold by the RIAJ.

== Track listing ==
=== 1985 single ===
No.	Title	Lyrics	Music	Arrangement	Length
1.	"Dancing Hero (Eat You Up)" (Danshingu Hīrō (Eat You Up) (ダンシング・ヒーロー (Eat You Up)))	Hitoshi Shinohara	Angelina Kyte; Anthony Baker	Kōji Makaino	3:49
2.	"Zenmaijikake no Suiyōbi" ((ぜんまいじかけの水曜日; "Mainspring Wednesday"))	Yasushi Akimoto	Kazuhiko Matsuo	Mitsuo Hagita	4:08

2013 bonus tracks

No.	Title	Length
3.	"Dancing Hero (Eat You Up)" (Original Karaoke)	3:47
4.	"Zenmaijikake no Suiyōbi (Original Karaoke)" (Original Karaoke)	4:08

=== Dancing Hero: All Eat You Up ===
All lyrics are written by Hitoshi Shinohara, except where indicated; all music is composed by Angelina Kyte and Anthony Baker.

No.	Title	Lyrics	Arrangement	Length
1.	"Dancing Hero (Eat You Up) (ダンシング・ヒーロー (Eat You Up), Danshingu Hīrō (Eat You Up))"		Kōji Makaino	3:47
2.	"Dancing Hero (Eat You Up)" (Modern Version)		Makaino	4:04
3.	"Dancing Hero (Eat You Up)" (Dear Pop Singer Version)		Kiyoji Motoyama	3:49
4.	"Dancing Hero (Eat You Up)" (Special English Version)	Marco Bruno	Makaino	3:47
5.	"Dancing Hero (Eat You Up)" ('70 Mirror Ball Mix)		Paradise Groove Productions	5:08
6.	"Dancing Hero (Eat You Up)" (Club Mix)		Yukio Sugai; Koichi Kaminaga; Shungen Kataoka	5:52
7.	"Dancing Hero (Eat You Up)" (Euro Mix)		Hiroyuki Yasumoto	3:34
8.	"Dancing Hero (Eat You Up)" (Extended Euro Mix)		Yasumoto	4:43
9.	"Dancing Hero (Eat You Up)" (Dancing Beat 2005 Mix)		Sandro Olive; Dave Rodgers	4:50
10.	"Dancing Hero (Eat You Up)" (Dear Pop Singer Remix Version)		Ogla Ozzy	3:42
11.	"Dancing Hero (Eat You Up)" (Instrumental)		Makaino	3:47
Total length:				47:07

== Charts ==
=== 1985 single ===
Weekly charts

Chart (1985)	Peak position
Oricon Weekly Singles Chart	5
The Best Ten	2
Uta no Top Ten	5

Year-end charts

Chart (1986)	Peak position
Oricon Year-End Chart	12
The Best Ten Year-End Chart	9

=== Dancing Hero: All Eat You Up ===
Weekly charts

Chart	Peak position
Billboard Japan Hot 100 (2017)	2
Billboard Japan Download Songs (2018)	6
Billboard Japan Streaming Songs (2018)	3

Year-end charts

Chart (2018)	Peak position
Billboard Japan Hot 100	23

== Certification ==
Region	Certification	Certified units/sales
Japan (RIAJ) Digital single	Gold	100,000^{*}
^{*} Sales figures based on certification alone.

== Dancing Hero: The Archives ==
"Dancing Hero: The Archives"

Single by Yōko Oginome
- Language: Japanese; English
- Released: December 20, 2017
- Recorded: 1985–2017
- Genre: J-pop; Eurobeat; dance-pop
- Length: 61:53
- Label: Victor

Yōko Oginome singles chronology
"Love" (2001)	"Dancing Hero: The Archives" (2017)	"Mushi no Tsubuyaki" (2020)

Music video
- Dancing Hero (Eat You Up) [Dear Pop Singer Ver.] on YouTube

On December 20, 2017, Oginome released a special CD titled Dancing Hero: The Archives (ダンシング・ヒーロー ジ・アーカイブス, Danshingu Hīrō Ji Ākaibusu), which is an expanded version of "Dancing Hero: All Eat You Up" with a live version and additional instrumental versions. The Instrumental (Up-Tempo) version of the song is the same one used by the Tomioka Dance Club on their live performances.

The single peaked at No. 15 on Oricon's singles chart in 2018.

=== Track listing ===
All lyrics are written by Hitoshi Shinohara, except where indicated; all music is composed by Angelina Kyte and Anthony Baker.

No.	Title	Lyrics	Arrangement	Length
1.	"Dancing Hero (Eat You Up) (ダンシング・ヒーロー (Eat You Up), Danshingu Hīrō (Eat You Up))" (1985 Original EP Version)		Kōji Makaino	3:48
2.	"Dancing Hero (Eat You Up)" (Special English Version)	Marco Bruno	Makaino	3:46
3.	"Dancing Hero (Eat You Up)" (Modern Version)		Makaino	4:06
4.	"Dancing Hero (Eat You Up)" ('70 Mirror Ball Mix)		Paradise Groove Productions	5:07
5.	"Dancing Hero (Eat You Up)" (Club Mix)		Yukio Sugai; Koichi Kaminaga; Shungen Kataoka	5:51
6.	"Dancing Hero (Eat You Up)" (Euro Mix)		Hiroyuki Yasumoto	3:32
7.	"Dancing Hero (Eat You Up)" (Extended Euro Mix)		Yasumoto	4:41
8.	"Dancing Hero (Eat You Up)" (Dancing Beat 2005 Mix)		Sandro Oliva; Dave Rodgers	4:49
9.	"Dancing Hero (Eat You Up)" (Dear Pop Singer Remix Version)		Ogla Ozzy	3:43
10.	"Dancing Hero (Eat You Up)" (Dear Pop Singer Version)		Kiyoji Motoyama	3:49
11.	"Dancing Hero (Eat You Up)" (Live (1989 Verge of Love: Budokan Live))			3:58
12.	"Dancing Hero (Eat You Up)" (Original Karaoke)		Makaino	3:48
13.	"Dancing Hero (Eat You Up)" (Instrumental (Up-Tempo))		Makaino	3:37
14.	"Dancing Hero (Eat You Up)" (Dear Pop Singer Version (Instrumental))		Motoyama	3:51
15.	"Dancing Hero (Eat You Up)" (Dear Pop Singer Version (a Cappella))		Motoyama	3:27
Total length:				61:53

=== Charts ===
Chart (2018)	Peak position
Oricon Weekly Singles Chart	15

== Cover versions ==
- Priscilla Chan covered the song in Cantonese as "Tiu Mou Gaai" (Chinese: 跳舞街; lit. "Dancing Street") in 1986. The song topped the Hong Kong charts and was awarded the 1986 Jade Solid Gold Best Ten Award for Most Popular Disco Song.
- Taiwanese singer Qian Youlan covered the song in Mandarin as "Bōlí wǔ xié" (Chinese: 玻璃舞鞋; lit. "Glass Dancing Shoes") in 1987.
- In the 1990s, Sandeep Sapkota released a Nepalese version called "Dance Tonight" in his album Ayaam.
- Demon Kakka covered the song on his 2007 cover album Girls Rock Hakurai. His cover incorporates the lyrics of Angie Gold's version.
- MAX covered the song on their 2010 cover album Be MAX.
- Runa Rukawa covered the song in 2015 as her second single.
- Akina Nakamori covered the song on her 2017 cover album Cage.
- In 2018, Celeb Five, a South Korean parody group consisting of comedians Song Eun-i, Shin Bong-sun, Ahn Young-mi, Kim Young-hee, and Kim Shin-young, released a mondegreen parody of the song titled "Celeb Five (I Wanna Be a Celeb)" (Korean: 셀럽파이브 (셀럽이 되고 싶어); RR: Selleop paibeu (selleobi doego sipeo)), borrowing the bubbly dance choreography and concept from Tomioka Dance Club. The music video was directed by Shindong from Super Junior.
- Bentley Jones covered the song on his 2019 cover album Translated.
- DeluxeXDeluxe covered the song on their 2023 album Senshibankō.
- Sora Amamiya covered the song on her 2023 cover album Covers II: Sora Amamiya Favorite Songs.

== See also ==
- 1985 in Japanese music
