= Yōko Oginome =

Japanese singer, actress (born 1968)

- 荻野目 洋子
- Born: Yōko Oginome; December 10, 1968 (age 57); Kashiwa, Chiba Prefecture, Japan
- Other names: YO-CO; Yōko Tsujino (辻野 洋子)
- Occupations: Actress; singer-songwriter; voice actress
- Agent: Rising Production
- Height: 160 cm (5 ft 3 in)
- Spouse: Ryuso Tsujino (m. 2001)
- Children: 3
- Relatives: Keiko Oginome (sister)
- Musical career
- Genres: J-pop; kayōkyoku; dance-pop; pop rock; city pop
- Instruments: Vocals; ukulele
- Years active: 1979–present
- Label: Victor Entertainment (1984–2025)

Japanese name
- Kanji: 荻野目 洋子
- Hiragana: おぎのめ ようこ
- Katakana: オギノメ ヨウコ
Transcriptions
- Romanization: Oginome Yōko
- Website: rising-pro.jp/artist/oginome/

Yōko Oginome (荻野目 洋子, Oginome Yōko; born December 10, 1968 in Kashiwa, Chiba Prefecture, Japan), married name Yōko Tsujino (辻野 洋子, Tsujino Yōko), is a former pop idol, actress and voice actress, who gained popularity in the mid-1980s. Her fans often call her Oginome-chan. Her husband is Ryuso Tsujino. Oginome is affiliated with Rising Production.

== Career ==
Oginome spent most of her elementary and junior high years living in the town of Ranzan in Saitama Prefecture, though she attended school in the city of Sakura. She graduated from Horikoshi High School in Nakano, Tokyo.

While in elementary school, Oginome won a contest and was selected to be part of a three-member group called "Milk" (ミルク, Miruku) under the CBS/Sony label. She took the nickname "Rumi" (ルミ) and partnered with Kazumi Obata (Mimi) (小畑和美(ミミ), Obata Kazumi) and Kinuko Ohmori (Kumi) (大森絹子(クミ), Ōmori Kinuko). The group only released two singles and broke up a little over a year after forming. During junior high, Oginome auditioned for a part in Kitty Film's live action movie Shonben Rider, and was subsequently voice cast in their new anime series Miyuki in the role of the heroine, Miyuki Wakamatsu. This led to roles in the anime film Baribari Densetsu and the children's TV series Ugo Ugo Lhuga.

Oginome made her solo singing debut in 1984 with "Mirai Kōkai (Sailing)" after finishing up work on Miyuki, though she did not become well known for another year or so after that. During this slow period, her single Beloved Caribbean received wide play as a rooting song at baseball and soccer games for teams such the Seibu Lions, Fukuoka Daiei Hawks, and Cerezo Osaka.

The song that catapulted Oginome into the ranks of superstars was her 1985 release "Dancing Hero (Eat You Up)", a cover of Angie Gold's hi-NRG song "Eat You Up". After that song, almost every song she released was instantly popular, and she began to appear in commercials and on variety shows where her Eurobeat style gained even more exposure. "Dancing Hero" received a boost in popularity in 2017 after an Osaka Prefecture high school's dance club, Tomioka Dance Club (TDC) used it as part of their dance routine that is known as the "Bubble Dance" (named after the dance routine symbolizes the Japan economic bubble era) that went viral after performing it in a competition dressed in eighties attire. She was also host of the Young Studio 101 variety show, a show hosted at various times by other popular idol stars such as Yoko Minamino and Miyoko Yoshimoto.

Her acting career really started in 1986 with starring roles in programs such as the TBS drama Early Spring Story (早春物語, Sōshun Monogatari), the 1987 TBS series Cheers to the Baby! (赤ちゃんに乾杯！, Akachan ni Kanpai!), and the 1989 Fuji TV drama Please Don't Worry! (こまらせないで!, Komarasenai de!). Oginome also sang the theme songs for these programs. She also appeared in several NHK drama series, including Rin Rin to (凛凛と) (1990), Tokyo Kunitori Monogatari (トーキョー国盗り物語) (1993), and Nagoya Okane Monogatari (名古屋お金物語) (1995).

Oginome has crossed wits with comedian and actor Beat Takeshi on the NTV network variety show Super Jockey, a show known for its crass humor and topics of discussion. She also appeared as a guest performer on the TBS network variety show Takeshi – Tokoro no Dracula ga Neratteru (たけし・所のドラキュラが狙ってる), starring Takeshi and George Tokoro.

On June 21, 2025, Oginome announced on her Instagram account that her contract with Victor Entertainment has ended and she will pursue a business partnership with Rising Production, whom she has been affiliated with for over 40 years.

== Personal life ==
Oginome's elder sister is actress Keiko Oginome. On April 30, 1990, film director Yoshitaka Kawai was found dead in Keiko's apartment, having hanged himself after Keiko wanted to end their relationship after five years. Because Keiko was too shocked by the incident, Yōko had to speak to the press on her behalf.

In 2001, Oginome was four months pregnant when she had a shotgun wedding with Ryuso Tsujino, a professional tennis player with whom she had graduated from Horikoshi High School. Oginome had a second child in 2004, and took a year off work to spend time with her children and family. She announced the pending birth of her third child in her blog on March 16, 2006, and the safe delivery on August 10, 2006.

== Discography ==
- Teens Romance (1984)
- Freesia no Ame (1985)
- Kaigara Terrace (1985)
- Raspberry Wind (1986)
- Non-Stopper: Yōko Oginome "The Beat" Special (1986)
- Route 246 Connexion (1987)
- CD-Rider (1988)
- Verge of Love (1988)
- Verge of Love (Japanese version) (1989)
- Fair Tension (1989)
- Knock on My Door (1990)
- Trust Me (1991)
- Ryūkō Kashu (1992)
- Nudist (1992)
- Scandal (1994)
- Chains (1997)
- Bug in a Dress (2023)

== Filmography ==
=== Anime ===
- Baribari Densetsu - Ai Itō
- Miyuki - Miyuki Wakamatsu

=== TV series ===
- Ugo Ugo Ruga (a TV show for kids) - Planet-chan

=== Film ===
- Momotaro Forever (1988)

=== Kōhaku Uta Gassen appearances ===
Year / Broadcast	Appearance	Song	Appearance order	Opponent
1986 (Shōwa 61) / 37th	Debut	"Dancing Hero (Eat You Up)"	1/20	Shonentai
1987 (Shōwa 62) / 38th	2	"Roppongi Junjōha"	12/20	Shonentai
1989 (Heisei 1) / 40th	3	"You're My Life"	5/20	The Checkers
1990 (Heisei 2) / 41st	4	"Gallery"	3/29	Shonentai
1992 (Heisei 4) / 43rd	5	"Coffee Rumba"	6/28	Masahiro Motoki
