= Anne Nolan =

Irish singer-songwriter and author (born 1950)

- Born: 12 November 1950 (age 75); Dublin, Ireland
- Occupations: Singer, actress, author, television personality
- Years active: 1974–present
- Television: Top of the Pops; Loose Women
- Family: Denise Nolan (sister); Maureen Nolan (sister); Linda Nolan (sister); Bernie Nolan (sister); Coleen Nolan (sister); Jake Roche (nephew)
- Website: www.denisenolan.co.uk/annenolan.html

Anne Nolan (born 12 November 1950) is an Irish singer, songwriter and author. She is a member of the Nolans.

== Early life ==
Anne Nolan was born in Dublin, Ireland, to Tommy (26 September 1925–1998) and Maureen Nolan (15 December 1926 – 30 December 2007). She is the second of eight siblings and the oldest of the Nolan sisters, preceding Denise, Maureen, Linda, Bernie, and Coleen, respectively; she also has two brothers, Tommy and Brian. The family lived in Raheny, a suburb of Dublin, before moving to Blackpool, England, in 1962.

== The Nolans ==
Anne, along with her sisters, was a part of the singing group the Nolans. The Nolans had a number one hit in 1979 with their song I'm in the Mood for Dancing. It charted at number two on the Irish music chart, and was number one on charts in Japan and South Africa. Anne left the group for a short period of time, between 1980 and 1982, with her sister Coleen stepping in for Anne. During Anne's two-year absence from the group, they won the 1981 Tokyo Music Festival with their song "Sexy Music".

Anne reunited with the Nolans as a five-piece (including Bernie, Coleen, Linda and Maureen) for a one-off performance of "I'm In the Mood for Dancing" for BBC One's All Time Greatest Party Songs, hosted by Tess Daly, which aired on 17 December 2005. They performed the song again on 9 August 2007 on Loose Women, but dismissed any immediate prospect of a full-scale reunion. Anne has only missed out on one reunion, which took place in 2009. She returned yet again in 2020, when they reformed, and remained in the group until its disbandment in 2022.

== Filmography ==
Year	Title	Role	Notes
1974	It’s Cliff Richard	Herself	Performer with The Nolans (2 Episodes)
1977	Seaside Special	Herself	Performer with The Nolans (2 Episodes)
1978	Multi-Coloured Swap Shop	Herself	Performer with The Nolans (2 Episodes)
1979	Mike Yarwood in Persons	Herself	Performer with The Nolans (6 Episodes)
1979-1980	Top of the Pops	Herself	Performer with The Nolans (8 Episodes)
1987	Filthy Rich & Catflap	Nolan Sister	Guest (1 Episode)
1992	The Word (TV series)	Panto Dame	Guest Role (1 Episode)
1993	The Ronson Mission	Herself	Guest (1 Episode)
2000	We Are Family	Herself	Television Special
2000	Brookside	Anne	Guest Role (1 Episode)
2004	Blackpool	Fortune Teller	Guest Role (1 Episode)
2007, 2025	Loose Women	Herself	Musical Performer (4 Episodes)
2013	This Morning	Herself	Guest (1 Episode)
2016	Why	Anne	Short Movie
2018-2019	Granada Reports	Nolan Sister	Contributing Reporter (3 Episodes)
2020	Lorraine	Herself	Guest (1 Episode)
2020	At Home with the Nolans	Herself	Series Lead (All 4 Episodes)
2020-2021	The Nolans Go Cruising	Herself	Series Lead (All 14 Episodes)
2021	Steph’s Packed Lunch	Herself	Guest Panelist (1 Episode)
2023	Jeremy Vine	Herself	Guest Panelist (1 Episode)
2024	Four Mothers (2024 film)	Dinner Lady	Supporting Role
2025	Good Morning Britain	Herself	Guest Panelist (1 Episode)

== Later works ==
Anne released her autobiography, titled Anne's Song, on 27 March 2008. In the book, co-written with Richard Barber, Anne said she had been repeatedly sexually abused by her father, from the age of 11 until she was 15 or 16.

In 2012, Anne Nolan released her solo album, Just One Voice.

In February 2020, it was announced that the Nolans would appear in a new TV series for Quest Red, The Nolans Go Crusing, a rival show to Channel 5's award-winning Cruising with Jane McDonald. In the first series, Anne performed with the group together for the first time in over 10 years. A second series was confirmed with the return of her sister Denise.

In 2021, Anne and sister Linda Nolan released Stronger Together, a book about dealing with a cancer diagnosis.

In November 2021, Anne spoke to the Daily Express about her career struggles as a Nolan member, revealing that the group were not paid correctly. Anne is an ambassador for the Great Pink Run, in which she gave a rare performance to thousands of runners in 2022.

In May 2023, Anne announced a new autobiography, New Beginnings, which was released on 20 May 2023. A paperback version was later released in 2024.

== Personal life ==
In 2022, it was announced that Nolan had beaten cancer for the second time.

== Discography ==
=== Studio albums ===
Year	Title	Details
1972	The Singing Nolans	Released: June 1972; Label: Nevis; Formats: LP
1975	The Nolan Sisters	Released: 1975; Label: Hanover Grand; Formats: LP
1978	20 Giant Hits	Released: 7 July 1978; Label: Target; Formats: LP, MC; Released in Japan in February 1981
1979	Nolan Sisters	Released: 19 November 1979; Label: Epic; Formats: LP, MC; Released in Japan as Dancing Sisters
1984	Girls Just Wanna Have Fun!	Released: 1 November 1984; Label: Towerbell; Formats: CD, LP, MC
1986	Tenderly	Released: 1986; Label: Stoic/Spartan; Formats: LP
1991	Playback Part 2	Released: 21 July 1991; Label: Teichiku; Formats: CD, MC; Momoe Yamaguchi cover album; Japan-only release
1991	Rock and Rolling Idol	Released: 21 August 1991; Label: Teichiku; Formats: CD; Kyōko Koizumi cover album; Japan-only release
1991	Tidal Wave	Released: 21 September 1991; Label: Teichiku; Formats: CD; J-pop cover album; Japan-only release
1992	The Hottest Place on Earth	Released: 21 May 1992; Label: Teichiku; Formats: CD; Featuring Princess Princess cover songs; Japan-only release
1992	Please Don't	Released: 23 September 1992; Label: Teichiku; Formats: CD; Kayōkyoku cover album; Japan-only release
2005	The Nolans Sing Momoe 2005	Released: 19 January 2005; Label: SMDR GT Music; Formats: CD; Japan-only release; Re-recording of Playback Part 2

=== EPs and mini-albums ===
Year	Title	Details
1972	The Singing Nolans (Silent Night)	Released: December 1972; Label: Nevis; Formats: 7" EP
1983	Greatest Original Hits – 4 Track E.P.	Released: March 1983; Label: Epic; Formats: 7" EP
1984	The Nolans	Released: March 1984; Label: Scoop 33; Formats: 7" EP, MC

=== Singles ===
Single	Year
"Blackpool" (as the Singing Nolans)	1972
"But I Do" (as the Nolan Sisters)	1974
"(Won't You) Make a Little Sunshine Shine" (as Nolan Sisters)	1975
"Rain" (as the Nolan Sisters)	1976
"Thanks for Calling" (as Nolan Sisters)	1976
"When You Are a King" (as the Nolan Sisters)	1976
"Love Transformation" (as Nolan Sisters)	1977
"Love Bandit" (as Nolan Sisters)	1977
"Don't It Make My Brown Eyes Blue" (as the Nolan Sisters)	1978
"Harry My Honolulu Lover" (as Nolan Sisters)	1979
"Spirit, Body and Soul" (as Nolan Sisters)	1979
"I'm in the Mood for Dancing"	1979
"Dressed to Kill"	1983
"Girls Just Wanna Have Fun" (Japan-only release)	1985
"Goodbye Nothin' to Say"	1985
"Let's Spend the Night Together"	1986
"I'm in the Mood for Dancin '89" (re-recording)	1989
"Take Me All" (Japan-only release)	1991
"Rock and Rolling Idol" (Japan-only release)	1991
"Tidal Wave" (Japan-only release)	1991
"Sexy Music" (re-recording; Japan-only release)	1991
"Colourful Nolans" (Japan-only release)	1992
"Mother Earth" (Japan-only release)	1992
"I'm in the Mood for Dancing" (re-recording)	1995
"Won't Be Long" (Japan-only release)	2006
