= The Cardinal Wiseman Catholic School, Greenford =

Coordinates: 51°31′31″N 0°21′07″W

The Cardinal Wiseman School

Location
- Greenford Road; Greenford, UB6 9AW; England

Information
- Type: Voluntary aided comprehensive
- Motto: Omnio Pro Christo (All things for Christ)
- Religious affiliation: Roman Catholic
- Established: 1959
- Local authority: Ealing
- Department for Education URN: 101934 Tables
- Ofsted: Reports
- Chair of Governors: N Alexander-Morrell
- Head teacher: Daniel Patrick Coyle
- Chaplain: Mary Boland
- Gender: Coeducational
- Age: 11 to 18
- Enrolment: 1918
- Houses: Campion, Clitherow, Fisher, More, Ward, Southwell
- Colours: Lower School: Royal Blue, White – Sixth Form: Black, White
- Website: http://www.wiseman.ealing.sch.uk/

The Cardinal Wiseman Catholic School, commonly known as The Cardinal Wiseman School, is a Catholic school comprising a comprehensive secondary school and sixth form located in Greenford, London, England. Its headteacher is Daniel Coyle and its student body consists of 11 to 19-year-olds.

== History ==
It is named after the Catholic Cardinal Wiseman, a Cardinal Archbishop of Westminster in 1850. It was originally opened in 1959, but has been reorganised several times since, including an amalgamation with the Cardinal Newman School in 1986.

- The original Cardinal Wiseman School was opened in 1959 as a special agreement school catering for 456 boys and girls aged 11–15 years. Since then the school has been reorganised several times.
- In 1974, The London Borough of Ealing established a comprehensive school system with the age of transfer being 12+ years.
- In 1986, The Cardinal Wiseman School amalgamated with the Cardinal Newman School and gained Voluntary Aided status.
- In 1995, the DfEE inaugurated Cardinal Wiseman School as a 'Technology and Art College' following the successful application from the school. This has attracted considerable extra funding that is not normally available.
- In 1998, The Cardinal Wiseman School applied to have the status extended for a second term. Following an inspection visit by the DfEE Technology Colleges Unit to see if the earlier targets had been achieved, the School was granted a second term without any conditions being imposed (other than the new targets!). A third term of Technology status has since been awarded and in 2006 the school was awarded a second specialist status in the area of Humanities. Once again, considerable funding has been attracted to the school.

== Location ==
It is located on Greenford Road in Greenford, near Greenford Broadway. There are many buses that stop close to it, including the E1, E2, E3, E5, E6, E7, E9, E10, E11, 92, 95, 105 and 282. It is next to, and often twinned with Our Lady of The Visitation Roman Catholic Primary School, and the Our Lady of the Visitation Church which the students visit often as year groups.

== Uniform ==
=== Years 7 to 11 ===
The students wear a uniform, consisting of a royal blue blazer, navy and white tie, white shirt, grey skirt (for girls) and charcoal trousers for boys. From April 2007, ties were not required to be worn during the summer term. However, this was a trial, and ties are now compulsory for all students all year. During the summer terms, girls can choose to wear summer blouses which they do not have to wear a tie with...

=== Sixth Form ===
The uniform for the Sixth Form differs to the lower school. Students are required to wear a black tie with the school crest over a plain white shirt with black trousers or skirts. They also can wear a black jumper over their shirt and tie.

== Notable former pupils ==
Popular band The Magic Numbers attended Cardinal Wiseman, as well as Jason Roberts, former Premier League striker for Blackburn Rovers and Reading. Also, the professional football player Aaron Pierre, who plays defender for Wycombe Wanderers attended Cardinal Wiseman.

Power metal band DragonForce's keyboardist Vadim Pruzhanov attended Cardinal Wiseman.

Young actor James Forde, who plays Liam Butcher in the soap EastEnders attended the school.

Comedian Javone Prince, famous for starring as Jerwayne in PhoneShop, also attended the school.

An article in The Independent in November 2014 by former pupil Kris Griffiths highlighted the famous alumni produced by Cardinal Wiseman during a difficult time for the school, following a stabbing.

== Alumni ==
- The Nolans - singers
  - Anne Nolan (b. 1950); Denise Nolan (b. 1952); Maureen Nolan (b. 1954); Linda Nolan (1959–2025); Coleen Nolan (b. 1965)
  - Reggie Clifford Addington (b. 1843); Onlyfans: Wet Regina
