= Bernie Nolan =

Irish actress and singer (1960–2013)

- Born: Bernadette Therese Nolan; 17 October 1960; Dublin, Ireland
- Died: 4 July 2013 (aged 52); Weybridge, Surrey, England
- Occupations: Actress, singer, entertainer
- Years active: 1974–2013
- Television: Top of the Pops; Brookside; The Bill; Loose Women; This Morning
- Spouse: Steve Doneathy (m. 1996)
- Children: 1
- Relatives: Anne Nolan (sister); Denise Nolan (sister); Maureen Nolan (sister); Linda Nolan (sister); Coleen Nolan (sister); Jake Roche (nephew)

Bernadette Therese Doneathy (née Nolan; 17 October 1960 – 4 July 2013) was an Irish actress, singer and television personality. She was a member of the girl group the Nolans, which she formed with her sisters. From the age of two, Bernie was brought up in Blackpool, Lancashire, England.

The Nolans began in 1974 and went on to have seven UK Top 20 hits, including "I'm in the Mood for Dancing" (1979), "Gotta Pull Myself Together" (1980) and "Attention to Me" (1981). They won the 1981 Tokyo Music Festival with "Sexy Music". Bernie left the group in 1995 to become an actress. On television, she had roles in the Channel 4 soap opera Brookside from 2000 to 2002 and the ITV police drama The Bill from 2002 to 2005, while her numerous roles in stage musicals included Mrs. Johnstone in Blood Brothers (1998–2000), Hannah Owens in Flashdance: The Musical (2008–2009) and Mama Morton in Chicago (2012). She was also a member of the Nolans line-up that reformed for a successful tour of the UK and Ireland in 2009. She died from breast cancer on 4 July 2013.

== Early life and career ==
Nolan was born in Dublin in 1960, the seventh of eight children born to Tommy and Maureen Nolan. The Nolan family moved from Dublin to Blackpool in 1962 and began performing as the Singing Nolans.

In 1974, the sisters formed the Nolan Sisters, later shortened to the Nolans and made their TV debut that year on Cliff Richard's show, It's Cliff Richard. In 1975, they supported Frank Sinatra on his European tour. In 1979, they released their biggest hit "I'm in the Mood for Dancing", which reached number three in the UK and was the first of seven top twenty hits. The others, with Bernie Nolan usually singing lead vocals, were "Don't Make Waves", (1980) "Gotta Pull Myself Together" (1980), "Who's Gonna Rock You" (1980), "Attention to Me" (1981), "Chemistry" (1981) and "Don't Love Me Too Hard" (1982). The Nolans sold millions of recordings worldwide, particularly in Japan where they sold over nine million albums and won the 1981 Tokyo Music Festival with the song "Sexy Music". Bernie also composed songs during this time, when she wrote two tracks for their 1982 album Portrait. In 1991, the group won the Planning award (企画賞, Kikaku-shō) of the 33rd Japan Record Awards for Cover version of Japanese pops.

== Acting ==
Nolan first acted as a cast member on the BBC Saturday morning children's show On the Waterfront. Critics positively reviewed her gift for comedy. The Nolan sisters and their music were a running gag on the show, and Bernie was joined by her sisters for a musical performance during at least one episode. Bernie left the group in 1995 to concentrate on her own acting career, which began with her 1993 performance in the stage play, The Devil Rides Out. She played Mrs. Johnstone in Willy Russell's Blood Brothers in the UK tour for over two years. She was the first of four Nolan sisters to have played the role, being followed by Denise, Linda and then Maureen. For this, the sisters earned a place in the Guinness Book of Records as the most siblings to play the same role at different times in a professional production.

In 2000, Nolan joined the cast of Channel 4's soap opera Brookside as Diane Murray after being noticed by Paul Marquess whilst starring in Blood Brothers. She left Brookside in 2002 when her character was killed off. She then went on to play Sheelagh Murphy in ITV's police drama series The Bill, in which she starred until 2005.

In 2006, Nolan took part in Channel 4's series The Games. Her stint on the game was to raise money for charity, including Alzheimer's and children's charities. In 2007, she starred in the play Mum's the Word, playing the character 'Robin' which she reprised in the 2008 tour (alongside her sister, Maureen who played Jill) and once again in 2010. During the summer season of 2007, Bernie appeared at the Blackpool North Pier Theatre in her own production, Soap Queens (And Kings!).

In 2008, Nolan appeared in the UK touring production of Flashdance the Musical for over a year, playing Hannah Owens. In January and February 2010, she participated in the ITV celebrity reality television programme Popstar to Operastar, reaching the final, where she lost to Darius Campbell. In 2012, she appeared as Mama Morton, in the UK tour of the musical Chicago.

== Return to singing ==
Nolan released the single "Macushla" in 2004 with the proceeds going to charity. It peaked at No. 38 in the UK Singles Chart in March 2004. Regarding this release, Lorraine Kelly wrote: "I wouldn't have expected anything else from one of the hardest working women in showbiz". In 2005, she released her debut solo album, All By Myself. The album consists mainly of power ballads, including the song "Better Place", written by Nolan's husband in memory of their daughter, Kate, who was stillborn in 1998. In 2009, four of the Nolan sisters, Bernie, Coleen, Linda and Maureen, reformed for a successful 23-date tour of the UK and Ireland. To coincide with the tour, they released an album, I'm in the Mood Again, which reached No. 22 in the UK Album Charts.

== Personal life ==
Nolan married drummer Steve Doneathy in 1996, in Lancashire. The couple lived in St Anne's on Sea, Lancashire and later in Weybridge, Surrey. In 1998, she gave birth to their daughter who was stillborn and another daughter in 1999. Bernie had previously been in a relationship with Bradley Walsh.

== Illness and death ==
On 23 April 2010, it was announced that Nolan was suffering from breast cancer. In October 2010, she stated that she was cancer-free after having undergone chemotherapy and a mastectomy and was taking herceptin. In February 2012, she announced that she was no longer taking cancer treatment drugs and was completely free of cancer.

At the end of October 2012, Nolan announced that the cancer had returned and had metastasised to her brain, lungs, liver, and bones.

Nolan died in her sleep, at her home in Surrey, England, on 4 July 2013, aged 52.

Nolan's funeral service was held on 17 July 2013 at the Grand Theatre, Blackpool and she was later cremated at Carleton Crematorium. Her ashes were then buried alongside those of her stillborn daughter, Kate.

== Discography ==
=== Studio albums ===
Title	Details	Year
The Singing Nolans	Released: June 1972; Label: Nevis; Formats: LP	1972
The Nolan Sisters	Released: 1975; Label: Hanover Grand; Formats: LP	1975
20 Giant Hits	Released: 7 July 1978; Label: Target; Formats: LP, MC; Released in Japan in February 1981	1978
Nolan Sisters	Released: 19 November 1979; Label: Epic; Formats: LP, MC; Released in Japan as Dancing Sisters	1979
Making Waves	Released: 17 October 1980; Label: Epic; Formats: LP, MC	1980
Portrait	Released: 19 March 1982; Label: Epic; Formats: CD, LP, MC; Released in Japan in December 1981 as Don't Love Me Too Hard	1982
Girls Just Wanna Have Fun!	Released: 1 November 1984; Label: Towerbell; Formats: CD, LP, MC	1984
Tenderly	Released: 1986; Label: Stoic/Spartan; Formats: LP	1986
Playback Part 2	Released: 21 July 1991; Label: Teichiku; Formats: CD, MC; Momoe Yamaguchi cover album; Japan-only release	1991
Rock and Rolling Idol	Released: 21 August 1991; Label: Teichiku; Formats: CD; Kyōko Koizumi cover album; Japan-only release	1991
Tidal Wave	Released: 21 September 1991; Label: Teichiku; Formats: CD; J-pop cover album; Japan-only release	1991
The Hottest Place on Earth	Released: 21 May 1992; Label: Teichiku; Formats: CD; Featuring Princess Princess cover songs; Japan-only release	1992
Please Don't	Released: 23 September 1992; Label: Teichiku; Formats: CD; Kayōkyoku cover album; Japan-only release	1992
The Nolans Sing Momoe 2005	Released: 19 January 2005; Label: SMDR GT Music; Formats: CD; Japan-only release; Re-recording of Playback Part 2	2005
I'm in the Mood Again	Released: 28 September 2009; Label: Universal; Formats: CD	2009

=== EPs and mini-albums ===
Title	Details	Year
The Singing Nolans (Silent Night)	Released: December 1972; Label: Nevis; Formats: 7" EP	1972
Dancing Sisters	Released: 21 July 1980; Label: Epic; Format: 10" mini-album; Japan-only release	1980
Greatest Original Hits – 4 Track E.P.	Released: March 1983; Label: Epic; Formats: 7" EP	1983
The Nolans	Released: March 1984; Label: Scoop 33; Formats: 7" EP, MC	1984

=== Singles ===
Single	Year
"Blackpool" (as the Singing Nolans)	1972
"But I Do" (as the Nolan Sisters)	1974
"(Won't You) Make a Little Sunshine Shine" (as Nolan Sisters)	1975
"Rain" (as the Nolan Sisters)	1976
"Thanks for Calling" (as Nolan Sisters)	1976
"When You Are a King" (as the Nolan Sisters)	1976
"Love Transformation" (as Nolan Sisters)	1977
"Love Bandit" (as Nolan Sisters)	1977
"Don't It Make My Brown Eyes Blue" (as the Nolan Sisters)	1978
"Harry My Honolulu Lover" (as Nolan Sisters)	1979
"Spirit, Body and Soul" (as Nolan Sisters)	1979
"I'm in the Mood for Dancing"	1979
"Don't Make Waves"	1980
"Gotta Pull Myself Together"	1980
"Who's Gonna Rock You"	1980
"I'd Like to Teach the World to Sing" (Japan-only release)	1981
"Attention to Me"	1981
"Sexy Music" (Japan-only release)	1981
"Chemistry"	1981
"Don't Love Me Too Hard"	1981
"Crashing Down"	1982
"Dragonfly"	1982
"Dressed to Kill"	1983
"Girls Just Wanna Have Fun" (Japan-only release)	1985
"Goodbye Nothin' to Say"	1985
"Let's Spend the Night Together"	1986
"I'm in the Mood for Dancin '89" (re-recording)	1989
"Take Me All" (Japan-only release)	1991
"Rock and Rolling Idol" (Japan-only release)	1991
"Tidal Wave" (Japan-only release)	1991
"Sexy Music" (re-recording; Japan-only release)	1991
"Colourful Nolans" (Japan-only release)	1992
"Mother Earth" (Japan-only release)	1992
"I'm in the Mood for Dancing" (re-recording)	1995

== Filmography ==
Year	Title	Role	Notes
1974	It’s Cliff Richard	Herself	Performer with The Nolans (2 Episodes)
1977	Seaside Special	Herself	Performer with The Nolans (2 Episodes)
1978	Multi-Coloured Swap Shop	Herself	Performer with The Nolans (2 Episodes)
1979	Mike Yarwood in Persons	Herself	Performer with The Nolans (6 Episodes)
1979-1981	Top of the Pops	Herself	Performer with The Nolans (15 Episodes)
1981-1982	The Nolans	Various Roles/Herself	Series Lead (4 Episodes)
1983-1985	Cheggers Plays Pop	Herself	Performer with The Nolans (8 Episodes)
1987	Filthy Rich & Catflap	Herself	Performer with The Nolans (1 Episode)
1988-1989	On the Waterfront (TV series)	Various Roles	Series Regular (24 Episodes)
1990	Family Fortunes	Princess Priscilla	Guest (1 Episode)
1993	The Ronson Mission	Herself	Guest (1 Episode)
1996	ChuckleVision	Mother	Guest Role; Series 7, Episode 6, “Chuckles in Charge”
2000-2002	Brookside	Diane Murray	Series Regular (250 Episodes)
2003	Today with Des and Mel	Herself	Guest (1 Episode)
2003	Stars in Their Eyes	Anastacia	Participant (1 Episode)
2003-2005	The Bill	Sgt. Sheelagh Murphy	Series Regular (119 Episodes)
2003-2010	Loose Women	Herself	Guest Panelist (9 Episodes)
2004	Richard & Judy	Herself	Guest (1 Episode)
2004	Never Mind the Buzzcocks	Herself	Panelist (1 Episode)
2005	The Wright Stuff	Herself	Panelist (1 Episode)
2006	The Games (British TV series)	Herself	Participant (8 Episodes)
2006	Celebrity Mastermind	Herself	Contestant (1 Episode)
2007-2012	The One Show	Herself	Contributor (2 Episodes)
2009	Ready, Steady, Cook	Herself	Contestant (1 Episode)
2009	The Nolans: In the Mood for Dancing	Herself	Contributor (Television Special)
2009-2011	This Morning	Herself	Musical Guest (4 Episodes)
2010	Popstar to Operastar	Herself	Contestant (6 Episodes)
2011-2012	Daybreak	Herself	Guest (4 Episodes)
2012	Lorraine	Herself	Contributor (1 Episode)
2012	Pointless Celebrities	Herself	Contestant (1 Episode)

== Theatre Credits ==
Year	Title	Role	Notes
1988-1989	Babes in the Wood	Maid Marion	Palace Theatre, Manchester, Manchester
1989-1990	Babes in the Wood	Maid Marion	Birmingham Hippodrome, Birmingham
1990-1991	Babes in the Wood	Maid Marion	Mayflower Theatre, Southampton
1991-1992	Dick Whittington	Jack Trot	New Theatre Hull, Hull
1992-1993	Jack and the Beanstalk	Jill	Kings Theatre, Southsea
1993	The Devil Rides Out	Tenith	Epstein Theatre, Liverpool
1993-1994	Cinderella	Fairy Godmother	Brighton Dome, Brighton
1994-1995	Jack and the Beanstalk	Jill	Brighton Dome, Brighton
1997-1998	Jack and the Beanstalk	Jill	Grand Theatre, Blackpool, Blackpool
1998-2000	Blood Brothers	Mrs. Johnstone	Phoenix Theatre, London & UK Tour
2006-2007	Snow White and the Seven Dwarfs	Queen Grizelda	Fairfield Halls, Croydon
2007-2008	Mum’s the Word	Robin	UK Tour
2007	Soap Queens (And Kings!)	Various Roles/Bernie Nolan	North Pier Theatre, Blackpool
2007-2008	Cinderella	Fairy Godmother	Manchester Opera House, Manchester
2008-2009	Flashdance (musical)	Hannah Owens	UK Tour
2009-2010	Cinderella	Fairy Godmother	Grove Theatre, Dunstable
2010	Calendar Girls (play)	Cora	UK Tour
2011-2012	Chicago (musical)	Mama Morton	UK Tour
2011-2012	Beauty and the Beast	Fairy Maleficent	Gordon Craig Theatre, Stevenage
2012-2013	Sleeping Beauty	Carabosse	Eastbourne Devonshire Park, Eastbourne

== Works ==
- Nolan, Bernie (12 September 2013). Now and Forever. London: Hodder & Stoughton. ISBN 978-1444776805.
