= Coleen Nolan =

English-Irish singer, television personality and author (born 1965)

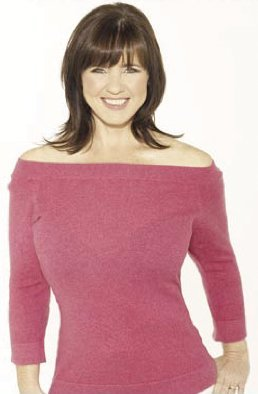
- Nolan in 2009
- Born: Coleen Patricia Nolan; 12 March 1965 (age 61); Blackpool, Lancashire, England
- Occupations: Singer; television personality; author
- Years active: 1974–present
- Television: Loose Women (2000–2001, 2004–2011, 2013–present); This Morning (2001–2002, 2010–2012); Celebrity Big Brother (2012, 2017)
- Spouses: Shane Richie (m. 1990; div. 1999) Ray Fensome (m. 2007; div. 2018)
- Partner: Michael Jones (2021–2024)
- Children: 3, including Jake Roche
- Relatives: Anne Nolan (sister); Denise Nolan (sister); Maureen Nolan (sister); Linda Nolan (sister); Bernie Nolan (sister)

Coleen Patricia Nolan (born 12 March 1965) is an Irish-British singer, television personality and author. She was a member of the Irish-English girl group the Nolans, in which she sang with her sisters. With over 30 million records sold worldwide, The Nolans are one of the world's biggest-selling girl groups.

Since 2000, Nolan has been a regular panellist on the ITV talk show Loose Women. From 2001 to 2002, she co-presented the ITV daytime show This Morning, and later returned to the show from 2010 to 2012 as a presenter of the interactive hub segments. In 2009, she competed on the fourth series of the ITV show Dancing on Ice, in which she finished in fourth place. In 2012, Nolan appeared on the tenth series of the Channel 5 reality series Celebrity Big Brother, finishing as runner-up. She returned to Celebrity Big Brother in 2017, winning the nineteenth series.

== Early life ==
Coleen Patricia Nolan was born 12 March 1965 in Blackpool, England, to Irish parents. She is the youngest of eight children and the only one born in England.

== Career ==
On 5 February 1974, Nolan made her first television appearance with her sisters when she was almost nine years old, as The Nolans appeared on the It's Cliff Richard! television series. With the line-up featuring all six sisters and billed as The Nolan Sisters, they performed "Stuck on You". That same year they released their debut single, "But I Do", with Coleen singing lead vocals. Owing to her age, Coleen would not become a full-time member of the group until 1980, when she was fifteen, although she does appear in the music video to their 1979 hit "I'm in the Mood for Dancing", which reached number three in the UK singles chart. The group had further UK top twenty hits with "Don't Make Waves" (1980), "Gotta Pull Myself Together" (1980), "Who's Gonna Rock You" (1981), "Attention to Me" (1981), "Chemistry" (1981) and "Don't Love Me Too Hard" (1982). In 1981, they won the Tokyo Music Festival with the song "Sexy Music".

On 14 January 1987, Coleen appeared alongside her sisters Anne, Bernie and Maureen in the BBC sitcom Filthy Rich & Catflap. In 1991, the group won a 33rd Japan Record Awards Kikaku-shō (Prize for Planning) for a cover versions of Japanese pop music. Coleen left the group in 1994 to concentrate on raising a family, although she did return briefly in 1995 to promote a re-recorded version of "I'm in the Mood for Dancing".

In 2000, Coleen Nolan became a regular panellist on ITV's Loose Women. She left Loose Women on 28 July 2011, only to return again on 7 October 2013 as a regular panellist. Since July 2014, Nolan has also been a relief anchor of the show.

Nolan presented the programme, The Truth About... Eternal Youth about plastic surgery on ITV in 2009, and presented The Secret Guide To Women's Health in 2010 on Sky Real Lives.

In 2000, Nolan played the part of Janelle Cooper in the short comedy film, Rattler.

Beginning on 11 January 2009, Nolan took part in the fourth series of Dancing on Ice on ITV. Of her appearance on the show Nolan said, "I've never really skated. When I was 14 I used to go to Disco Beat in Blackpool with my friend. We'd skate round once, hanging on to each other, and spend the rest of the night posing, like 14-year-old girls do. I could only go forwards, I couldn't stop!" She was eliminated in week 10, finishing in fourth place. She went on to co-host the spin-off show Dancing on Ice Friday with Ben Shephard in 2010. and on 27 February 2011, she hosted Dancing on Ice, in place of Holly Willoughby who fell ill.

On 15 August 2012, Nolan was announced as the eleventh celebrity to enter the Celebrity Big Brother house on Channel 5.

In 2013, Nolan was a resident agony aunt on the ITV chat show The Alan Titchmarsh Show, appearing on the show every Friday. In 2015, she took part in ITV's Give a Pet a Home series which worked alongside the RSPCA in Birmingham. The show began airing in April 2015, with Amanda Holden as host.

In 2017, Nolan participated in Celebrity Big Brother again, where she was voted "least trustworthy" in the first week. In the house she struck up a friendship with Game of Thrones actor James Cosmo. On day 18, she was put up for eviction by Jamie O'Hara during a nominations twist in the superheroes shopping task. On day 19, it was revealed that Nolan received the most votes out of her, Chloe Ferry, Kim Woodburn and Jedward in a live flash vote. Also on day 19, Nolan voted for Cosmo to gain eternal immunity which he eventually won after the most housemates voted for him. On Day 32 (3 February), she was announced as the winner of Celebrity Big Brother 19.

On 3 September 2018, Nolan announced that she would embark on her first solo concert tour, the Never Too Late Tour, in 2019. Originally scheduled to begin on 11 January, the tour was postponed indefinitely on 6 September 2018 after Nolan received criticism for bullying fellow Celebrity Big Brother housemate Kim Woodburn on air on an episode of Loose Women.

=== Guest appearances ===
On 4 March 2002, Nolan was a panellist on BBC panel game show Never Mind the Buzzcocks. On 25 May, she appeared on An Audience with Brian Conley. Later in 2002, she took part in the first series of the reality television programme Celebrity Fit Club, which followed overweight celebrities as they tried to lose weight for charity.

On 7 January 2003, Nolan appeared in the documentary We Are Family, which chronicled the success stories of various musical acts that were made up of family members. In 2002 and 2003, she was a panellist on the chat show The Wright Stuff on Five and guest hosted the show herself in 2013.

On 3 June 2005, Nolan took part in the first series of the ITV daytime programme, Have I Been Here Before? presented by Phillip Schofield, which offered celebrity guests the chance to see if they have lived before, through past life regression. Nolan was said to have been a "nervous 16-year-old debutante".

In September 2006, Nolan returned to Celebrity Fit Club as part of the judging panel in the fourth series. On 6 October she was a guest on The Sharon Osbourne Show and, ten days later, was a guest on the Irish chat show, broadcast and produced by RTÉ, The Podge and Rodge Show.

On 19 September 2008, Nolan appeared on Al Murray's Happy Hour and on 27 September she appeared with her family on the third series of All Star Family Fortunes competing against Barry McGuigan and his family. She has also made guest appearances on Alan Carr's Celebrity Ding Dong (31 October) and The Paul O'Grady Show (18 December), both on Channel 4.

On 13 September 2012, she was a guest panellist on an episode of Celebrity Juice on ITV2.

On 15 February 2013, Nolan stood in for Matthew Wright as host of The Wright Stuff on Channel 5.

=== Other work ===
Nolan has a weekly column in Best magazine. She also has an agony aunt column in the Daily Mirror titled Dear Coleen.

In 2007, Nolan featured in television advertisements for the supermarket chain Iceland, along with her sister Bernie and former Loose Women colleague Kerry Katona. She appeared in further commercials for Iceland during the next couple of years. She was also the new face of Park Christmas Savings and appeared in their television advertisements in December 2010.

In early 2008, she released a DVD, A Brand New You, produced with Rosemary Conley.

Nolan made her pantomime debut in 2013, playing the fairy godmother at the Manchester Opera House, and reprised the role in 2017 at the Bradford Alhambra.

== Personal life ==
Nolan married actor Shane Richie in 1990. They had two sons, including Jake Roche, before splitting up in 1997 and divorcing in 1999.

She gave birth to a daughter in 2001 and became engaged to her longtime boyfriend Ray Fensome, a musician from Leeds, when he proposed on her 40th birthday in 2005. They married in November 2007, and divorced in 2018. Nolan said that she and Fensome have been able to remain friends. Nolan moved to Dilhorne in the Staffordshire Moorlands in 2024.

In August 2026, Nolan confirmed she was in a relationship with Ryan Brockbank, a lecturer at the Fashion Retail Academy in London.

Her mother, Maureen, had Alzheimer's disease. In 2006, Coleen Nolan opened the first Alzheimer's Society information centre on The Fylde coast. Maureen died on 30 December 2007.

=== Health ===
In July 2023, Nolan announced that she had been diagnosed with basal-cell carcinoma, a type of skin cancer.

=== Controversies ===
Nolan, has, at various times, made controversial statements and shared opinions which have garnered wider attention.

In 2005, on Loose Women, she said that if her 16-year-old son passed his exams, she would pay for him to go on a sex trip to Amsterdam, and that she had given her fiancé Ray Fensome permission to have a one-night stand during the proposed trip. She gained criticism from her former partner, Shane Richie, who said he was "disgusted and appalled" by her comments about their son, and that he hoped and assumed "it was said in total jest." Nolan defended her comments, saying that she had told her son that she would pay for a long weekend for him anywhere in the world and that he had mentioned how he and his friends had always wanted to go to Amsterdam to see the red light district. She also noted that had he planned to go on a trip to Ibiza, everybody would have thought that was fine, even though he would probably have unprotected sex with numerous girls.

In the News of the World newspaper, Nolan said, "In an ideal world I'd never condone my son sleeping with hookers, but it's a fact of life that boys of his age have casual sex. So if I'm pushed, I'd rather he does it somewhere well-policed and where the girls have health checks than behind the wall of a club in Ibiza with absolutely no safeguards." In relation to her giving Fensome permission to have a one-night stand, she said: "In all honesty, I couldn't care less [if he does]. What bothers me more is the thought of Ray going into a bar, chatting up a really stunning girl, having sex with her, spending the night and waking up with her the next morning. I couldn't cope with that."

In January 2007, during a debate on Loose Women about same-sex adoption, Nolan said that gay people should not be allowed to adopt children, followed by her opinion that "there's only so much I want to accept".

In May 2015, she compared gay rights with supporting ISIS, and said that bakery owners should be permitted to discriminate against same-sex couples who wish to buy a wedding cake. Her comments were made on Loose Women after a Belfast bakery company was sued for refusing to bake a cake in support of same-sex marriage. Following the show, some viewers took to Twitter and called for ITV to dismiss Nolan for making the comments.

In August 2018, Nolan, her sister Linda and fellow Loose Women panellists Janet Street-Porter and Linda Robson caused controversy due to their actions in an on-air argument with guest Kim Woodburn, which led to Woodburn walking off set crying after the topic of Woodburn's childhood abuse arose. Woodburn and Coleen Nolan had an onscreen history of a difficult relationship due to comments and claims made from both parties in the Celebrity Big Brother house in 2017. Woodburn had been invited to come on the show to reconcile with Nolan, but later claimed her attendance was due to the money offered. The row led to over 8,000 complaints to Ofcom, with the majority accusing Nolan and her fellow panellists of "bullying Woodburn". Some of Woodburn's supporters also set up a campaign to have Nolan removed from the Loose Women panel completely. Nolan apologised on This Morning in September 2018. She confirmed that she had taken a break from Loose Women, and that she had also postponed her Never Too Late solo concert tour. Nolan returned to Loose Women in December 2018.

== Discography ==
=== Studio albums ===
Year	Title	Details
1980	Making Waves	Released: 17 October 1980; Label: Epic; Formats: LP, MC
1982	Portrait	Released: 19 March 1982; Label: Epic; Formats: CD, LP, MC; Released in Japan in December 1981 as Don't Love Me Too Hard
1984	Girls Just Wanna Have Fun!	Released: 1 November 1984; Label: Towerbell; Formats: CD, LP, MC
1986	Tenderly	Released: 1986; Label: Stoic/Spartan; Formats: LP
1991	Playback Part 2	Released: 21 July 1991; Label: Teichiku; Formats: CD, MC; Momoe Yamaguchi cover album; Japan-only release
1991	Rock and Rolling Idol	Released: 21 August 1991; Label: Teichiku; Formats: CD; Kyōko Koizumi cover album; Japan-only release
1991	Tidal Wave	Released: 21 September 1991; Label: Teichiku; Formats: CD; J-pop cover album; Japan-only release
1992	The Hottest Place on Earth	Released: 21 May 1992; Label: Teichiku; Formats: CD; Featuring Princess Princess cover songs; Japan-only release
1992	Please Don't	Released: 23 September 1992; Label: Teichiku; Formats: CD; Kayōkyoku cover album; Japan-only release
2005	The Nolans Sing Momoe 2005	Released: 19 January 2005; Label: SMDR GT Music; Formats: CD; Japan-only release; Re-recording of Playback Part 2
2009	I'm in the Mood Again	Released: 28 September 2009; Label: Universal; Formats: CD

=== EPs and mini-albums ===
Year	Title	Details	Certifications and sales
1980	Dancing Sisters	Released: 21 July 1980; Label: Epic; Format: 10" mini-album; Japan-only release	JAP: 56,190
1983	Greatest Original Hits	Released: March 1983; Label: Epic; Formats: 7" EP	
1984	The Nolans	Released: March 1984; Label: Scoop 33; Formats: 7" EP, MC	

=== Singles ===
Single	Year
"Don't Make Waves"	1980
"Gotta Pull Myself Together"	1980
"Who's Gonna Rock You"	1980
"I'd Like to Teach the World to Sing" (Japan-only release)	1981
"Attention to Me"	1981
"Sexy Music" (Japan-only release)	1981
"Chemistry"	1981
"Don't Love Me Too Hard"	1981
"Crashing Down"	1982
"Dragonfly"	1982
"Dressed to Kill"	1983
"Girls Just Wanna Have Fun" (Japan-only release)	1985
"Goodbye Nothin' to Say"	1985
"Let's Spend the Night Together"	1986
"I'm in the Mood for Dancin '89" (re-recording)	1989
"Take Me All" (Japan-only release)	1991
"Rock and Rolling Idol" (Japan-only release)	1991
"Tidal Wave" (Japan-only release)	1991
"Sexy Music" (re-recording; Japan-only release)	1991
"Colourful Nolans" (Japan-only release)	1992
"Mother Earth" (Japan-only release)	1992
"Won't Be Long" (Japan-only release)	2006

== Filmography ==
Television
Year	Title	Role	Notes
1974	It's Cliff Richard!	Herself	1 episode
1987	Filthy Rich & Catflap	Herself	1 episode
2000–2001, 2004–2011, 2013–	Loose Women	Panellist	Relief anchor (2014–)
2001, 2011	This Morning	Presenter	Series regular
2002	Never Mind the Buzzcocks	Herself	1 episode
2002	An Audience with Brian Conley	Herself	1 episode
2002	Celebrity Fit Club	Participant	Series regular
2002, 2003	The Wright Stuff	Panelist	Guest appearances
2003	We Are Family	Herself	1 episode
2005	Have I Been Here Before?	Participant	1 episode
2006	Celebrity Fit Club	Judge	Series regular
2006	The Sharon Osbourne Show	Herself	1 episode
2006	The Podge and Rodge Show	Herself	1 episode
2008	Al Murray's Happy Hour	Herself	1 episode
2008	All Star Family Fortunes	Participant	
2008	Alan Carr's Celebrity Ding Dong	Herself	1 episode
2008	The Paul O'Grady Show	Herself	1 episode
2009	Dancing on Ice	Participant	Series regular
2009	The Truth About... Eternal Youth	Presenter	1 episode
2010	The Secret Guide To Women's Health	Presenter	Series regular
2010	Dancing on Ice: Friday	Presenter	Spin-off series from Dancing on Ice
2010–2012	This Morning	Presenter	The Hub segments
2011	Dancing on Ice	Presenter	1 episode
2011	Sing If You Can	Guest Judge	1 episode
2012	Celebrity Big Brother 10	Participant	Series regular, runner-up
2012	Celebrity Juice	Herself	1 episode
2013	The Alan Titchmarsh Show	Herself	Series regular
2015	Give a Pet a Home	Herself	1 series, 6 episodes
2017	Celebrity Big Brother 19	Participant	Series regular, winner
2017	In Therapy	Herself	1 episode
2019	Flirty Dancing	Participant	Stand up to cancer special
2020	The Nolans Go Cruising	Herself	8 episodes
2020	At Home with the Nolans	Herself	4 episodes
2021	Piers Morgan's Life Stories	Herself	1 episode
2023	The Great Stand Up to Cancer Bake Off	Herself	1 episode
2023	The Real Full Monty	Herself	2 episodes
2026	Celebs Go Dating	Herself	Cast Member; Series 15

Videos
Year	Title	Role	Notes
2008	A Brand New You	Herself	DVD
2008	Coleen Nolan's Disco Burn	Herself	Fitness DVD

Television advertisements
Year	Title
2007–2009	Iceland
2010	Park Christmas Savings
2014	Three UK

== Theatre credits ==
Year	Title	Role	Notes
1990-1991	Dick Whittington	Alice Fitzwarren	Harlequinn Theatre, Redhill, Surrey
2012-2013	Cinderella	Fairy Godmother	Liverpool Empire, Liverpool
2017-2018	Cinderella	Fairy Godmother	Alhambra Theatre, Bradford
2019	The Thunder Girls	Anita	The Lowry, Manchester
2024	Naked	Herself/Various	UK Tour
2026	This is Me	Herself/Various	UK Tour

== Bibliography ==
=== Biography ===
- Upfront and Personal: The Autobiography (Pan, 2009) ISBN 9780330506694
- Mum to Mum: Happy Memories and Honest Advice, From a Real Mum (Sidgwick & Jackson, 2010) ISBN 9780283071225
- No Regrets (Penguin, 2014) ISBN 9781405917322
- Live, Laugh, Love. Lessons I've Learnt. (Constable Books, 2021) ISBN 9781408715994
- A Hand to Hold: All I've Learnt About Grief (HarperNorth, 2024) ISBN 9780008716202

=== Novels ===
- Envy (Pan, 2010) ISBN 9780330516983
- Denial (Pan, 2011) ISBN 9780330516976

=== General non-fiction ===
- Coleen Nolan's Beauty Secrets: From Drab to Fab in 15 Minutes (Sidgwick & Jackson, 2010) ISBN 9780283071126

Preceded by Richard and Judy	Host of This Morning with Twiggy; 2001	Succeeded by John Leslie and Fern Britton

Preceded by Stephen Bear	Celebrity Big Brother UK winner Series 19 (2017)	Succeeded by Sarah Harding
