= Playback Part 2 =

Playback Part 2 may refer to:

- "Playback Part 2" (song), a 1978 song by Momoe Yamaguchi
- Playback Part 2 (album), a 1991 album by the Nolans, featuring the song
