= List of schools in the London Borough of Ealing =

This is a list of schools in the London Borough of Ealing, England.

== State-funded schools ==
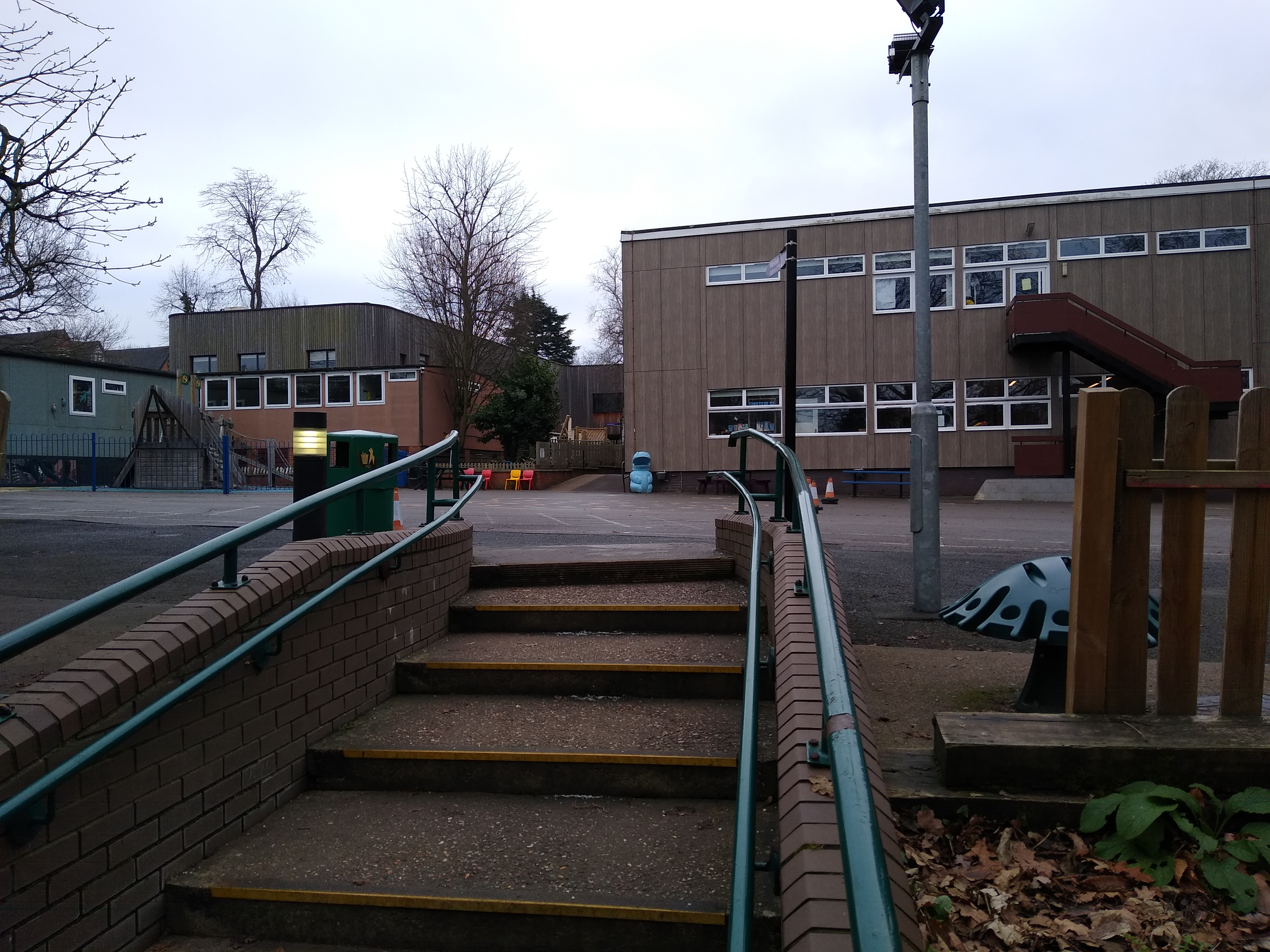
Montpelier Primary School

=== Primary schools ===
- Acton Gardens Primary School, Acton
- Alec Reed Academy, Northolt
- Allenby Primary School, Southall
- Ark Byron Primary Academy, Acton
- Ark Priory Primary Academy, Acton
- Beaconsfield Primary School, Southall
- Blair Peach Primary School, Southall
- Brentside Primary Academy, Hanwell
- Christ the Saviour CE Primary School, Ealing
- Clifton Primary School, Southall
- Coston Primary School, Greenford
- Dairy Meadow Primary School, Southall
- Derwentwater Primary School, Acton
- Dormers Wells Primary School, Southall
- Downe Manor Primary School, Northolt
- Drayton Green Primary School, Ealing
- Durdans Park Primary School, Southall
- East Acton Primary School, Acton
- Edward Betham CE Primary School, Greenford
- Featherstone Primary School, Southall
- Fielding Primary School, Ealing
- Gifford Primary School, Northolt
- Grange Primary School, Ealing
- Greenwood Primary School, Northolt
- Hambrough Primary School, Southall
- Havelock Primary School Southall
- Hobbayne Primary School, Hanwell
- Holy Family RC Primary School, Acton
- Horsenden Primary School, Greenford
- John Perryn Primary School, Acton
- Khalsa Primary School, Southall
- Lady Margaret Primary School, Southall
- Little Ealing Primary School, Ealing
- Mayfield Primary School, Hanwell
- Montpelier Primary School, Ealing
- Mount Carmel RC Primary School, Ealing
- North Ealing Primary School, Ealing
- North Primary School, Southall
- Oaklands Primary School, Hanwell
- Oldfield Primary School, Greenford
- Our Lady of The Visitation RC Primary School, Greenford
- Perivale Primary School, Greenford
- Petts Hill Primary School, Northolt
- Ravenor Primary School, Greenford
- St Anselm's RC Primary School, Southall
- St Gregory's RC Primary School, Ealing
- St John Fisher RC Primary School, Greenford
- St John's Primary School, Ealing
- St Joseph's RC Primary School, Ealing
- St Marks Primary School, Hanwell
- St Marys CE Primary School, Norwood Green
- St Raphael's RC Primary School, Northolt
- St Vincent's RC Primary School, Acton
- Selborne Primary School, Greenford
- Southfield Primary School, Chiswick
- Stanhope Primary School, Greenford
- Three Bridges Primary School, Norwood Green
- Tudor Primary School, Southall
- Vicar's Green Primary School, Perivale
- Viking Primary School, Northolt
- West Acton Primary School, Acton
- West Twyford Primary School, Acton
- Willow Tree Primary School Northolt
- Wolf Fields Primary School, Norwood Green
- Wood End Primary School, Northolt
- Woodlands Academy, Ealing

=== Secondary schools ===
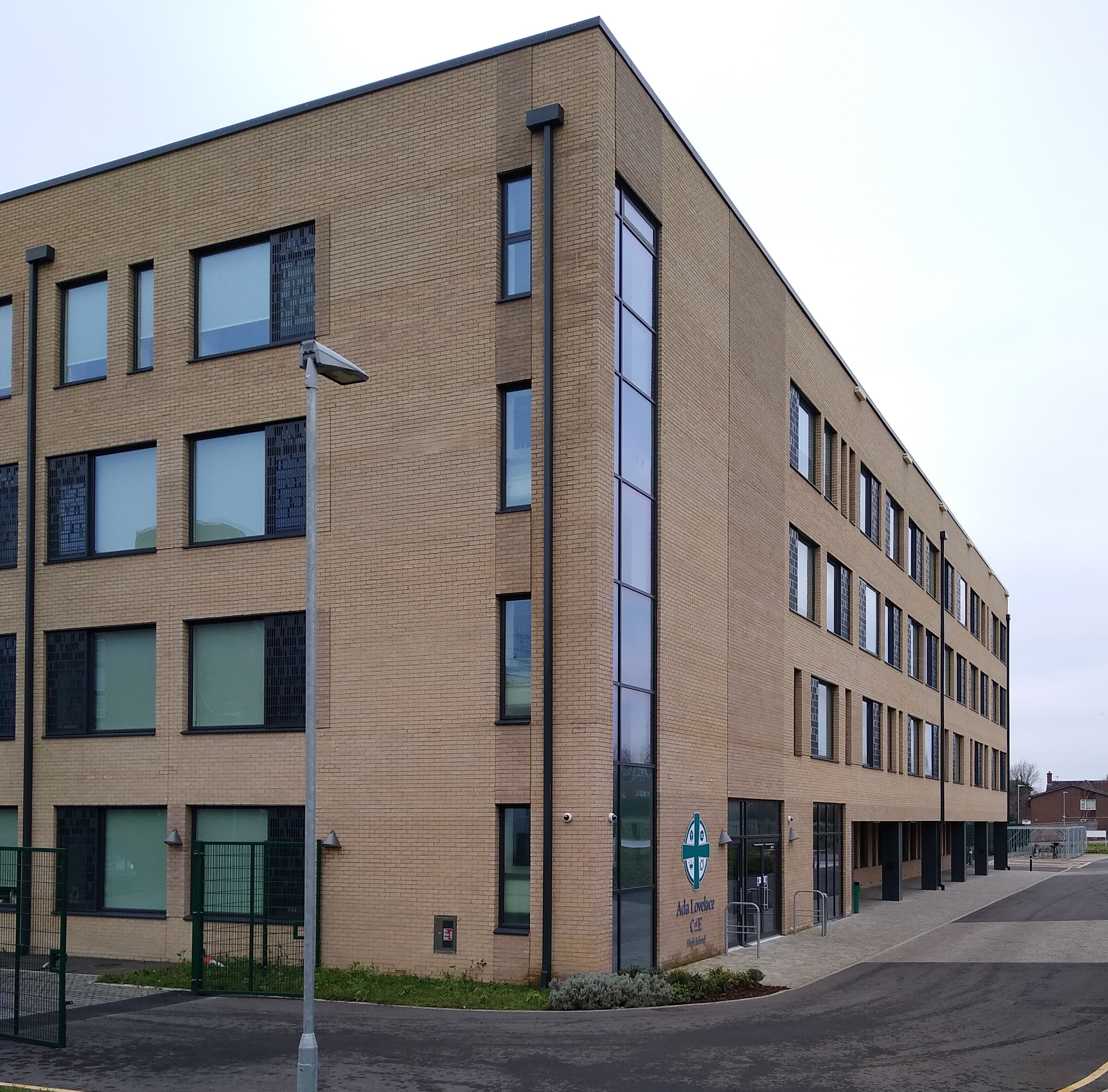
Ada Lovelace C of E High School

- Ada Lovelace CE High School, Greenford
- Alec Reed Academy, Northolt
- Ark Acton Academy, Acton
- Ark Soane Academy, Acton
- Brentside High School, Hanwell
- The Cardinal Wiseman Catholic School, Greenford
- Dormers Wells High School, Southall
- Drayton Manor High School, Hanwell
- Ealing Fields High School, Hanwell
- The Ellen Wilkinson School for Girls, Acton
- Elthorne Park High School, Hanwell
- Featherstone High School, Southall
- Greenford High School, Southall
- Islip Manor High School, Northolt
- Twyford Church of England High School, Acton
- Villiers High School, Southall
- William Perkin Church of England High School, Greenford

=== Special and alternative schools ===
- Belvue School, Northolt
- Castlebar School, Ealing
- Ealing Alternative Provision, Ealing
- Ealing Primary Centre, Greenford
- John Chilton School, Northolt
- Mandeville School, Greenford
- St Ann's School, Hanwell
- Springhallow School, Ealing

=== Further education ===
- West London College

== Independent schools ==
=== Primary and preparatory schools ===
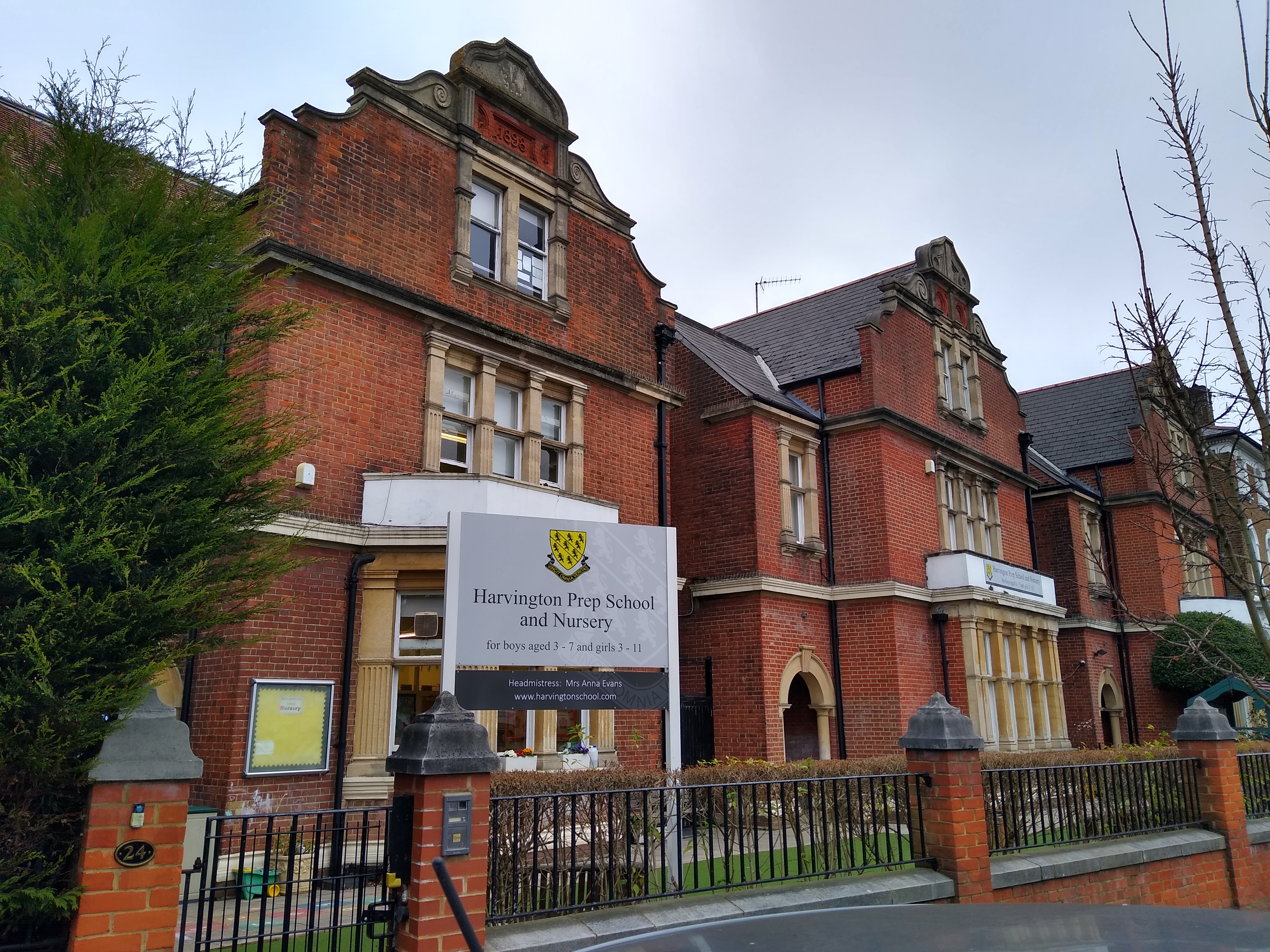
Harvington School

- Avenue House School, Ealing
- Clifton Lodge School, Ealing
- Durston House, Ealing
- Greek Primary School of London, Acton
- Harvington School, Ealing
- La Chouette School, Ealing
- London Welsh School, Hanwell
- Orchard House School, Chiswick

=== Senior and all-through schools ===
- Ayesha Siddiqa Girls School, Southall
- Ealing Independent College, Ealing
- The Eden School, Hanwell
- Japanese School in London, Acton
- Notting Hill & Ealing High School, Ealing
- St Augustine's Priory School, Ealing
- St Benedict's School, Ealing

=== Special and alternative schools ===
- Blooming Tree Pre Prep School, Acton
- Blooming Tree Primary School, Ealing
- Insights Independent School, West Ealing
- North West London Independent Special School, East Acton
- Seva Special School, West Ealing
- The Sybil Elgar School, Southall
