= Playback Part 2 (song) =

Single by Momoe Yamaguchi

from the album Dramatic
- Language: Japanese
- B-side: "Kake"
- Released: May 1, 1978
- Recorded: 1978
- Genre: Kayōkyoku
- Length: 3:20
- Label: CBS Sony
- Composer: Ryudo Uzaki
- Lyricist: Yoko Aki
- Producer: Masatoshi Sakai

Momoe Yamaguchi singles chronology
"Otomegi Kyō" (1978)	"Playback Part 2" (1978)	"Zettai Zetsumei" (1978)

"Playback Part 2" (プレイバックPart2, Pureibakku Pāto Tsū) is the 22nd single by Japanese idol Momoe Yamaguchi. Written by Yoko Aki and Ryudo Uzaki, the single was released on May 1, 1978, by CBS Sony.

== Background ==
The title "Playback" was suggested by Yamaguchi's management, who requested Aki and Uzaki to compose the song and Kōji Makaino to arrange it. When the first version was rejected, Aki and Uzaki worked overnight to revise the song and gave the new version to arranger Mitsuo Hagita; hence the song being titled "Playback Part 2". The original version with Makaino's arrangement was released as "Playback Part 1" in the compilation album The Best Playback.

"Playback" in the lyrics refers to a keyword of a current event that triggers a memory from the previous night. The first verse mentions the keyword, followed by the line, "Chotto matte! Playback!" (ちょっと待って！ Play Back！; "Wait a minute! Playback!"). Then the song stops, implying a rewind before proceeding to the second verse. The keyword in the second verse is "tobidashite itta onna" (飛び出していった女; "the woman who jumped out"), which is a line from Kenji Sawada's 1977 single "Katte ni Shiyagare" (勝手にしやがれ; "Do Whatever You Want"). The temporary silence in the middle of the song initially led to confusion from radio DJs who thought the song ended quickly.

When Yamaguchi first performed the song live on NHK, the line "shinku na Porsche" (真紅なポルシェ; "crimson Porsche") was replaced with "shinku na kuruma" (真紅なクルマ; "crimson car") due to broadcasting laws prohibiting the promotion of brands in song lyrics. By the time she performed the song on the 29th Kōhaku Uta Gassen that year, the "crimson Porsche" line was restored in the lyrics.

"Playback Part 2" earned Yamaguchi the Gold Award at the 20th Japan Record Awards and the Broadcast Music Award at the 9th Japan Music Awards.

== Commercial performance ==
The single peaked at No. 2 on Oricon's singles chart and landed at No. 15 on Oricon's 1978 year-ending chart, selling over 508,000 copies.

== Track listing ==
All lyrics are written by Yoko Aki; all music is composed by Ryudo Uzaki; all music is arranged by Mitsuo Hagita.

7-inch vinyl
No.	Title	Length
1.	"Playback Part 2" (Pureibakku Pāto Tsū (プレイバックPart2))	3:20
2.	"Kake" ((賭け; lit. "Bet"))	3:05
Total length:		6:25

== Charts ==
=== Weekly charts ===
Chart (1978)	Peak position
Japan (Oricon)	2

=== Year-end charts ===
Chart (1978)	Peak position
Japan (Oricon)	15

== Cover versions ==
- Yūko Nitō covered the song on her 1990 cover album Easter.
- The Nolans covered the song in English on their 1991 Momoe Yamaguchi cover album, also titled Playback Part 2. They re-recorded the song on their 2005 cover album The Nolans Sing Momoe 2005 to commemorate Yamaguchi's 25th retirement anniversary.
- Midori Karashima covered the song on the 2004 album Momoe Yamaguchi Tribute: Thank You For...
- Misono covered the song on her 2009 Cover Album.
- Megumi Mori covered the song on her 2013 cover album Grace of the Guitar.
- Penicillin covered the song on their 2014 single "Sol".
- Ai Nishida covered the song on her 2015 cover album Ai no Uta ~Love Songs~.
- Pushim covered the song on their 2016 cover album The Nostalgics.
- Yamaguchi's son Yutaro Miura covered the song on his 2017 cover album I'm Home.
- Keisuke Kuwata covered the song on his 2019 live video Act Against AIDS 2018: Heisei 30! Daisankai Hitori Benishiro Uta Gassen.
- ANNA (Ayumi Nakamura and Nanase Aikawa) covered the song on their 2019 EP W.
- Suzuka from Atarashii Gakko! sang for the channel 88rising a part of the song in a video

== See also ==
- 1978 in Japanese music
