= The Nolans Sings J-Pop =

Compilation album by The Nolans
- Released: 19 July 2017 (Japan)
- Genre: Pop; pop rock
- Label: Pony Canyon

The Nolans chronology
I'm in the Mood Again (2009)	The Nolans Sings J-Pop (2017)	The Nolans: The Ultimate Collection (2018)

The Nolans Sings J-Pop (ノーランズ～J-POP胸キュンカバ, Nōranzu ~ J-poppu Munekyun Kaba) is a compilation album by the Irish pop group The Nolans. Released on 19 July 2017 exclusively in Japan by Pony Canyon, the album consists of 18 English-language covers of popular J-pop songs recorded throughout the group's career.

== Track listing ==
No.	Title	Writer(s)	Original artist	Length
1.	"Diamonds" (Daiamondo (ダイアモンド))	Kanako Nakayama; Kaori Okui	Princess Princess
2.	"Never Ending Wind" (Kaze Tachinu (風立ちぬ, "The Wind Rises"))	Takashi Matsumoto; Eiichi Ohtaki	Seiko Matsuda
3.	"Sweet Little Devil" (Yasashii Akuma (やさしい悪魔))	Makoto Kitajō; Takuro Yoshida	Candies
4.	"Tears" (Kazari ja Nai no yo Namida wa (飾りじゃないのよ涙は, "The Tears Are Not a Decoration"))	Yōsui Inoue	Akina Nakamori
5.	"Days That Used to Be" (Ii Hi Tabidachi (いい日旅立ち, "Leaving on a Good Day"))	Shinji Tanimura	Momoe Yamaguchi
6.	"Autumn Cherry Cosmos" (Kosumosu (秋桜（コスモス）, "Cosmos"))	Masashi Sada	Momoe Yamaguchi
7.	"Step Into My Dream" (Yume no Naka e (夢の中へ))	Inoue	Yōsui Inoue
8.	"Tidal Wave" (Samishii Nettaigyo (淋しい熱帯魚, "Lonely Tropical Fish"))	Neko Oikawa; Masaya Ozeki	Wink
9.	"Roppongi Street" (Roppongi Junjōha (六本木純情派る, "Roppongi Pure-Heart Clique"))	Masao Urino; Akihiro Yoshimi	Yōko Oginome
10.	"Rock 'n' Roll Widow" (Rokkunrōru Uidō (ロックンロール・ウィドウ))	Yoko Aki; Ryudo Uzaki	Momoe Yamaguchi
11.	"M"	Kyōko Tomita; Okui	Princess Princess
12.	"Simple Handkerchief" (Momen no Hankachīfu (木綿のハンカチーフ, "Cotton Handkerchief"))	Matsumoto; Kyōhei Tsutsumi	Hiromi Ōta
13.	"Holiday Romance" (Koi no Bakansu (恋のバカンス, "Vacance de L'amour"))	Tokiko Iwatani; Hiroshi Miyagawa	The Peanuts
14.	"Desire" (Dezaia (Jōnetsu) (DESIRE～情熱～))	Kisaburō Suzuki; Aki	Akina Nakamori
15.	"Toy Boy" (Toshishita no Otokonoko (年下の男の子, "Younger Boy"))	Kazuya Senke; Yūsuke Hoguchi	Candies
16.	"Wait for Me" (Nagisa no Barukonī (渚のバルコニー, "The Balcony by the Beach"))	Matsumoto; Yumi Matsutoya	Seiko Matsuda
17.	"The Hottest Place on Earth" (Sekai de Ichiban Atsui Natsu (世界でいちばん熱い夏, The Hottest Summer in the World))	Tomita; Okui	Princess Princess
18.	"I'll Never Say Goodbye" (Sayonara no Mukōgawa (さよならの向う側, "The Other Side of Goodbye"))	Aki; Uzaki	Momoe Yamaguchi
