= The Hottest Place on Earth =

Studio album by The Nolans
- Released: 21 May 1992 (Japan)
- Recorded: 1992
- Genre: Pop rock
- Label: Teichiku Records
- Producer: Clive Scott

The Nolans chronology
Days That Used to Be (1992)	The Hottest Place on Earth (1992)	Lost, Lonely Beaches (1992)

Singles from The Hottest Place on Earth
- 1. "Mother Earth" Released: 21 May 1992

The Hottest Place on Earth (世界でいちばん熱い夏, Sekai de Ichiban Atsui Natsu; The Hottest Summer in the World) is the twelfth studio album by the Irish pop group The Nolans. Released on 21 May 1992 exclusively in Japan by Teichiku Records, the album consists of five original songs and five English-language covers of Princess Princess songs.

== Track listing ==
No.	Title	Writer(s)	Lead vocals	Length
1.	"Mother Earth" (Yasashiku Chikyū ni Seppun wo (やさしく地球に接吻を; "Kiss the Earth Gently"))	Des Dyer; Keisuke Matsuki; Machiko Watanabe	Bernadette Nolan	4:31
2.	"The Hottest Place on Earth" (Sekai de Ichiban Atsui Natsu (世界でいちばん熱い夏; The Hottest Summer in the World))	Dyer; Kyōko Tomita; Kaori Okui	Bernadette Nolan	4:05
3.	"Diamonds" (Daiamondo (ダイアモンド))	Dyer; Kanako Nakayama; Okui	Bernadette Nolan	4:49
4.	"19 Growing Up (Ode to My Buddy)"	Dyer; Tomita; Okui	Bernadette Nolan	4:18
5.	"M"	Dyer; Tomita; Okui	Coleen Patricia Nolan	4:29
6.	"You Are My Starship" (Yū ā Mai Sutāshippu (ユー・アー・マイ・スターシップ))	Dyer; Tomita; Okui	Coleen Patricia Nolan	4:33
7.	"Who Loves You Baby?" (Kon'ya mo Rabu Yū Beibī (今夜もラブ・ユー・ベイビー; "Love You Baby Tonight"))	Dyer; Masaya Ozeki	Coleen Patricia Nolan	3:52
8.	"Goldies of Old" (Omoide no Hitto Songu (想い出のヒット・ソング; "Hit Song Memories"))	Dyer; Masamichi Sugi	Anne Barbara-Maria Nolan	3:27
9.	"Somebody Loves You" (Dareka ga Anata wo Aishiteru (誰かがあなたを愛してる))	Clive Scott; Ray Hedges	Bernadette Nolan	3:57
10.	"You're Back" (Koi no Kambakku (恋のカムバック; "Come Back to Love"))	Dyer; Ozeki	Marie Antoinette Nolan	3:32

- Tracks 2–6 originally recorded by Princess Princess.
