= The Nolans =

Irish pop group

- Also known as: The Nolan Sisters
- Origin: Dublin, Ireland and Blackpool, Lancashire, England
- Genres: Pop; disco; europop
- Years active: 1974–2005; 2009; 2020–present
- Labels: EMI; Sony; UMG; CBS; Epic; Jive; Teichiku (Japan)
- Members: Maureen Nolan; Anne Nolan; Denise Nolan
- Past members: Coleen Nolan; Linda Nolan; Bernie Nolan

The Nolans are an Irish-English girl group formed in Blackpool in 1974, originally known as the Nolan Sisters. They changed their name to the Nolans in 1980. Between 1979 and 1982, they enjoyed a string of hit singles, including "I'm in the Mood for Dancing", "Gotta Pull Myself Together", "Who's Gonna Rock You", "Attention to Me" and "Chemistry". The Nolans became one of the world’s best-selling girl groups and found particular success in Japan. In 1981, they became the first European act to win the Tokyo Music Festival with "Sexy Music" and, in 1991, they received a Japan Record Award (Tokubetsu Kikaku Shō).

The group disbanded in 2005 but re-formed in 2009 with four of the original members. A "farewell tour" was planned for 2013, but it was cancelled after the death of Bernie Nolan. A reality-television show featuring the group was later launched, but no further albums or tours were announced. Linda Nolan died in 2025 of breast cancer and double pneumonia.

In May 2026, Maureen, Anne and Denise announced a set of performances in Blackpool. In June, Coleen joined her sisters to receive the prestigious Lifetime Contribution to the Music Industry Award at the Pride of Éireann International Awards. The ceremony took place on 20 June at the Manchester Hotel Deansgate, celebrating the group's 50 years in the industry.

== History ==
=== 1962–1974: Early career ===
Thomas 'Tommy' (26 September 1926 – 2 September 1998) and Mary Jane 'Maureen' Breslin (15 December 1926 – 30 December 2007) met at Clerys Ballroom in Dublin and raised their family in Raheny. Tommy had a radio show on RTÉ. The lack of work forced the young family to move from Dublin to Blackpool in 1962, and there they launched a family singing group, the Singing Nolans, in 1963. The original line-up comprised the parents, and seven of their eight children: sons Tommy (born 20 July 1949) and Brian (born 19 June 1955), and daughters Anne (born 12 November 1950), Denise (born 6 April 1952), Maureen (born 14 June 1954), Linda (23 February 1959 – 15 January 2025), and Bernadette ('Bernie', 17 October 1960 – 4 July 2013). The youngest member, Coleen (born 12 March 1965), did not formally join the group until 1980 as she was too young to perform with her sisters.

The family performed even as the five girls went to school at Blackpool's St Mary's Catholic College. The Nolans also attended The Cardinal Wiseman School in Greenford, West London.

The Singing Nolans recorded an album, The Singing Nolans, a single "Blackpool" – a song about their local football club, Blackpool F.C., that is still used on match days at Bloomfield Road – and the EP Silent Night for the Nevis label in 1972.

Tommy Nolan Sr. died of liver cancer on 2 September 1998, aged 71. His widow, Maureen, died in Blackpool on 30 December 2007, aged 81, after suffering from Alzheimer's disease.

Anne Nolan released her autobiography, titled Anne's Song, on 27 March 2008. In the book, co-written with Richard Barber, Anne said she had been repeatedly sexually abused by her father, from the age of 11 until she was 15 or 16.

=== 1973–1978: The Nolan Sisters ===
In 1973, the Singing Nolans were booked to sing in Blackpool's Cliffs Hotel on Christmas Day. After their performance, their father Tommy Nolan was at the bar when businessman Joe Lewis told Tommy that he was very interested for Tommy's daughters to move to London to sing in Lewis's club above the New London Theatre. In early 1974, the Nolan clan moved to London to work in the London Rooms on Drury Lane, where the girls changed their name from the Singing Nolans to the Nolan Sisters. They made their television debut on Cliff Richard's TV show, singing "Now I'm Stuck on You" and were the resident guests for the entire run of series 4 of It's Cliff Richard on BBC1. The line-up included Coleen, who sang lead on their debut single "But I Do" released on EMI records in 1974 (EMI 2209).

Following the 1974 single on EMI, they released several more non-charting singles on Target Records from 1975 to 1977, several of which were composed by Roger Greenaway. A 1977 eponymous album on the Hanover Grand label was sold only at the London Club Room in Drury Lane and is ranked by price guides as the most collectible UK release by the group.

During this period the Nolan Sisters appeared as the musical act for series six of The Two Ronnies.

=== 1978–1984: Chart success ===
Their chart breakthrough came in 1978 with the covers album 20 Giant Hits on Target, which reached No.3 in the UK. That year, they also supported Engelbert Humperdinck on a US tour, and Denise left the group to pursue a solo career.

In 1979, the group participated in the UK Eurovision selection contest A Song For Europe. Their track "Harry My Honolulu Lover" had been written by former Eurovision contestant Terry Bradford who had finished 11th in the 1978 contest as part of the group Co-Co with their song "Bad Old Days". The track was considered the favourite before the contest, but ultimately placed fourth, with Black Lace going on to represent the UK with their song "Mary Ann". A lightning strike by BBC technicians minutes before the broadcast led to the cancellation of the show. In order to find a winner nonetheless, the regional juries had to make their decisions based on audio tapes of the songs from the show's rehearsals. The group had been booked to promote the song on many BBC shows, leading to speculation that it had been taken for granted they would win the competition. One booking was representing the BBC at the 25th Anniversary celebrations for the Eurovision network, which was staged in Montreux, Switzerland, in May 1979.

After signing with CBS subsidiary Epic Records in 1979, the group enjoyed their greatest period of commercial success. Although their debut release – the failed UK Eurovision entry "Harry, My Honolulu Lover" – did not chart, their second Epic single "Spirit, Body and Soul" released in September, reached number 34 on the UK singles chart. In December 1979, the group released the disco-flavoured single "I'm in the Mood for Dancing", which became their best-known tune and biggest hit. It reached number 3 in the UK, number 2 in their native Ireland and number 1 in Japan, a rare event for a Western act; the single eventually sold more than 600,000 copies in Japan. The song, like the majority of the Nolans' hit singles, was written by Ben Findon, Mike Myers and Robert Puzey.

The self-titled album Nolan Sisters, which featured the first two charting Epic singles, eventually reached number 15 in the UK. Although still not an official member of the group, the youngest member of the family, Coleen, appeared on the cover of the album and in the video for "I'm in the Mood for Dancing". In early 1980, the group changed its name from the Nolan Sisters to the Nolans. Coleen released one solo single on Target in 1978, a song about Prince Andrew's status as a teen idol.

The group's 1980 album Making Waves peaked at number 11 but had the longest UK album chart run of their career (33 weeks) Singles from the album included "Don't Make Waves" released April 1980 (UK number 12, Ireland number 5); "Gotta Pull Myself Together" released September 1980 (UK number 9, Ireland number 8) and "Who's Gonna Rock You" released November 1980 (co-written by Billy Ocean, UK number 12, Ireland number 14). It was around the time of the release of "Gotta Pull Myself Together" that the line-up changed. Following her marriage, Anne left the group and Coleen became an official member (Anne appears on the UK single sleeve, while Coleen appears in the music video). "Gotta Pull Myself Together" also became the group's first Australian hit, reaching number 3 in 1981; its parent album reached number 10 in Australia The last UK single release from Making Waves was "Attention To Me" released in March 1981 (UK number 9, Ireland number 5, Australia number 94).

"Sexy Music", also featured on Making Waves, won the grand prize at the 1981 Tokyo Music Festival, and was subsequently released as a single in Japan. This became the group's third number 1 on the Japanese Import chart – following "I'm in the Mood for Dancing" and "Gotta Pull Myself Together". During 1981, Coleen and Linda contributed vocals to the Young and Moody Band along with Motörhead frontman Lemmy, which scored a UK number 63 hit with "Don't Do That".

Another 1981 single "Chemistry" released in August (UK number 15, Ireland number 11, Australia number 51) was drawn from the album Portrait. This would become the group's second Top 10 UK album, reaching number 7 in 1982 (Australia number 54), and was also the source of their final UK Top 20 single "Don't Love Me Too Hard" released February 1982 (UK number 14, Ireland number 17). A third single from the album "Crashing Down" was released in May 1982. Anne rejoined the group in late 1982, making it a five-piece line up.

The 1982 compilation album Altogether reached UK number 52, but the accompanying single, "Dragonfly", failed to chart. In 1983, their single, "Dressed to Kill" was removed from the chart due to allegations of chart rigging. The group had released the single with a limited edition poster, exclusive to shops which registered chart sales. Later in the year, Linda left the group to pursue a solo career. At the time, she was nicknamed the "Naughty Nolan" due to risque publicity photos. The resulting four-woman line up of Bernie, Anne, Maureen and Coleen was stable until 1994.

The covers album Girls Just Wanna Have Fun! was released on Towerbell Records in 1984 and reached number 39. The Nolans also achieved success in Europe and New Zealand.

=== 1984–2005: New labels and line-ups ===
In 1986, the Nolans released the LP Tenderly, which was an album of standards. They appeared in the second episode of the 1987 comedy series Filthy Rich & Catflap, playing themselves in a blackmail plot and performing "I'm in the Mood for Dancing". A 1989 re-recording of the same song reached number 99, and another version reached number 51 in 1995.

In 1991, the group signed with Teichiku Records to record a series of albums covering popular Japanese songs in English. The first release was Playback Part 2, which covered songs made popular by Momoe Yamaguchi. Rock and Rolling Idol featured covers of Kyōko Koizumi songs. Tidal Wave (Samishii Nettaigyo) included the group's versions of songs made famous by Wink, Seiko Matsuda, Akina Nakamori, Candies, and Yōko Oginome. The Hottest Place on Earth featured five covers of Princess Princess songs. The Nolans became the first Irish group to be awarded the 33rd Japan Record Awards Kikaku-shō (Prize for Planning) for their cover albums. Compilations of their Japanese material, often featuring remixes and some featuring other artists as well, were regularly released throughout the 1990s and 2000s in Japan, while several budget-priced compilations of their Epic-era material (sometimes re-recorded) appeared in the UK.

Coleen, who had married performer Shane Richie in 1990 and was now a mother of two, quit the group in 1994. In 1995, longstanding lead singer Bernie left to pursue an acting career. Anne and Maureen continued as a two-piece version of the Nolans. A re-recorded and remixed version of "I'm in the Mood for Dancing", released on the Living Beat label, reached number 51 in the UK in 1995, and Bernie and Coleen returned briefly to promote the single.

From 2000, the line-up consisted of Maureen and Anne, together with Anne's daughter Amy and unrelated singer Julia Duckworth, and concentrated on live appearances, often at venues such as Butlins holiday camps and bingo halls. The group disbanded in 2005, with Maureen Nolan having been a member for 31 consecutive years.

Anne was diagnosed with breast cancer in 2000, as was Linda in 2006. As part of her treatment, Linda had a breast removed. Bernie was diagnosed with breast cancer in April 2010 but successfully fought the disease until it later returned.

=== 2009–2014: Solo careers, reformation and death of Bernie Nolan ===
Most of the sisters have continued to work in show business, pursuing careers in acting, musical theatre, pantomime and touring. As an actress, Bernie had prominent TV roles in Brookside and The Bill, and toured in several stage shows, including the adaptation of the movie Flashdance in 2008. Coleen has mostly worked as a television presenter, hosting This Morning briefly in 2001 and appearing regularly as a panellist on Loose Women since 2000.

Four of the sisters – Bernie, Denise, Linda, and Maureen – have played the role of Mrs. Johnstone in the musical Blood Brothers. Both Maureen and Bernie have performed in productions of the comedy Mum's the Word, and they toured together in the show in 2008.

Linda performed in the role of Maggie May at Blackpool's Central Pier for 10 years, clocking up more than 1,000 performances and toured with Prisoner Cell Block H – The Musical. Denise released one solo single on Pye in 1979 and two on Mercury in 1982. She has frequently performed a Judy Garland tribute show.

The Nolans reunited as a five-piece (Anne, Bernie, Coleen, Linda and Maureen) for one-off performances of "I'm in the Mood for Dancing" first for BBC One's All Time Greatest Party Songs, hosted by Tess Daly, which aired on 17 December 2005 and again on 9 August 2007 on Loose Women, but dismissed any immediate prospect of a full-scale reunion.

The Nolans announced in June 2009 that they were reforming for a UK and Ireland tour. Four members – Coleen, Bernie, Linda and Maureen – undertook the tour, in October and November 2009. The two other sisters, Anne and Denise, were not involved.

Coleen said she had instigated the reformation after speaking to her manager. She explained: "We've been approached before over the last four or five years but it has never felt like the right time and the right people being involved, and this time it was like 'let's just do it once more". The sisters performed their hits and several classic diva-type songs.

The reunion however sparked a split in the family as Anne has appeared in the press stating that she was excluded from the tour, and also issued a statement on her official website, which includes the comment: "they are not my sisters anymore". Denise also issued a statement in support of Anne, claiming that the real reason for the reunion was due to some of the sisters being in financial difficulty. Bernie and Maureen later made amends with Anne and Denise, but Bernie stated there would not be a reconciliation with Coleen and Linda.

The Nolans released a new album, I'm in the Mood Again, on 28 September 2009, which reached number 22 in the UK Albums Chart, their highest-charting album for 27 years. A live DVD was released on 9 November 2009. 2011 saw the release of an autobiography Survivors: Our Story.

In 2012, the eldest of the sisters, Anne, released her solo album, Just One Voice.

In September 2012, a farewell tour was announced, to take place from 15 February to 14 March 2013. The line-up would be the same as for the 2009 tour. On 28 October it was announced that the 2013 Farewell Tour had been postponed as a result of Bernie's breast cancer resurgence. Early in 2013, the tour was cancelled completely. Bernie Nolan died from metastatic cancer on 4 July 2013, her cancer having spread to her brain, lungs, liver and bones. In 2014, Linda said that Bernie's death had resulted in her making up with Anne and Denise. Also in 2014, Coleen stated that they had been asked to tour again, with Bernie appearing via holograms, but that it was still too soon.

=== 2020–present: The Nolans Go Cruising , death of Linda Nolan and touring ===
In February 2020, it was announced that the group would appear in a new TV series for Quest Red, The Nolans Go Cruising, a rival show to Channel 5's award-winning Cruising with Jane McDonald. In the first series the band performed together for the first time in over 10 years. A second series was confirmed with the return of original member Denise Nolan, who would be performing with the band for the first time in over 40 years. In January 2025, Linda Nolan was admitted to Blackpool Victoria Hospital with double pneumonia. She fell into a coma, and died on the morning of 15 January, at the age of 65.

In May 2026, Maureen, Anne and Denise announced a set of performances in Blackpool. In June, Coleen joined her sisters to receive the prestigious Lifetime Contribution to the Music Industry Award at the Pride of Éireann International Awards. The ceremony took place on 20 June at the Manchester Hotel Deansgate, celebrating the group's 50 years in the industry.

Since 2026 Ann, Maureen and Denise have been touring the UK. This is the first time this version of the band have toured.

== Discography ==
- The Singing Nolans (1972)
- The Nolan Sisters (1975)
- 20 Giant Hits (1978)
- Nolan Sisters (1979)
- Making Waves (1980)
- Portrait (1982)
- Girls Just Wanna Have Fun! (1984)
- Tenderly (1986)
- Playback Part 2 (1991)
- Rock and Rolling Idol (1991)
- Tidal Wave (1991)
- The Hottest Place on Earth (1992)
- Please Don't (1992)
- The Nolans Sing Momoe 2005 (2005)
- I'm in the Mood Again (2009)

== Members ==
=== Current members ===
- Maureen Nolan (1974–2009, 2020–present)
- Anne Nolan (1974–1980, 1982–2005, 2020–present)
- Denise Nolan (1974–1978, 2022–present)

=== Former members ===
- Coleen Nolan (1979–1994, 2009, 2020–2022)
- Linda Nolan (1974–1983, 2009, 2020–2022; died 2025)
- Bernie Nolan (1974–1995, 2009; died 2013)

== Line-ups ==
- 1974-78: Maureen, Anne, Bernie, Linda and Denise
- 1978-80: Maureen, Anne, Bernie and Linda
- 1980-82: Maureen, Bernie, Linda and Coleen
- 1982-83: Maureen, Anne, Bernie, Linda and Coleen
- 1983-94: Maureen, Anne, Bernie and Coleen
- 1994-95: Maureen, Anne and Bernie
- 1995-00: Maureen and Anne
- 2000-05: Maureen, Anne, Amy and Julia Duckworth
- 2009: Maureen, Bernie, Linda and Coleen
- 2020 (TV show): Maureen, Anne, Linda, and Coleen
- 2021-22 (TV show): Maureen, Anne, Linda, Denise and Coleen
- 2026: Maureen, Anne, Denise

Member	1974–78	1978–80	1980–82	1982–83	1983–94	1994–95	1995–2000	2000–05	2005–08	2009	2010–19	2020–22
Maureen (1974–2009, 2020–2022)												
Anne (1974–1980, 1982–2005, 2020–2022)												
Bernie (1974–1995, 2009)												
Linda (1974–1983, 2009, 2020–2022)												
Denise (1974–1978, 2021–2022)												
Coleen (1980–1994, 2009, 2020–2022)												
Amy (2000–2005)												
Julia Duckworth (2000–2005)												

Notes:
- Coleen made occasional appearances in the 1970s, but did not become a full-time member until 1980.
- Coleen briefly returned to the group for the promotion of the 1995 re-release of "I'm in the Mood for Dancing" and filled in for Anne while she received treatment for cancer in 2000.
