= Girls Just Wanna Have Fun! =

Studio album by The Nolans
- Released: 1 November 1984
- Genre: Pop; dance-pop
- Length: 49:49
- Label: Towerbell; Mercury
- Producer: Richard Myhill

The Nolans chronology
Altogether (1982)	Girls Just Wanna Have Fun! (1984)	Tenderly (1986)

Girls Just Wanna Have Fun! is the seventh studio album by the Irish/British pop group The Nolans. Released in 1984 through Towerbell Records and Mercury Records, the album consists of medleys of recent pop hits as well as complete versions of recent hits. It was produced by Richard Myhill and was the group's first album for two years.

== Background ==
The album was released in November 1984, the group's first for two years and runs to 10 tracks, but includes 33 songs overall. It marked the first album without original member Linda Nolan following her departure from the group in 1983. It was also the first studio album to feature Anne Nolan since 1979.

The album followed a period of chart inactivity for the group over the past two years, but brought them back with the album entering the charts on 17 November 1984. It went on to peak at No.39 during an eight week run, exiting the charts in early 1985. The album was certified silver by the BPI in December 1984 for sales of over 60,000 copies.

Among the songs included seven were UK No.1 hits, while the majority of the others were top 10 hits. The oldest song included was Michael Jackson's "Don't Stop 'Til You Get Enough", dating back to 1979, while the most recent was The Thompson Twins' "Sister of Mercy", which was a hit in July 1984. The song "In Your Eyes" went on to be featured on the B-side of their 1985 single "Goodbye Nothin' to Say", also released on Towerbell Records. "Girls Just Wanna Have Fun!" was released in Japan as a single in 1985, with "Every Breath You Take" as the B-side.

The album was TV advertised and the group also promoted the album on shows such as The Little and Large Show and Pebble Mill at One. It was to be their final charting album in the UK for 25 years, when they released I'm in the Mood Again, which also included a cover of "It's Raining Men".

== Track listing ==
Side one

1. "Girls Just Wanna Have Fun Medley" – 6:18
  - "Girls Just Wanna Have Fun!" (Hazard) / "Time After Time" (Hyman) / "Holiday" (Hudson, Stevens) / "It's Raining Men" (Jabara, Shaffer) / "Right by Your Side" (Lennox, Stewart)
2. "Michael Jackson Medley" – 6:31
  - "Thriller" (Temperton) / "Rock with You" (Temperton) / "Off the Wall" (Temperton) / "Don't Stop 'Til You Get Enough" (Jackson) / "Beat It" (Jackson)
3. "Wherever I Lay My Hat (That's My Home)" (Gaye, Strong, Whitfield) – 2:43
4. "Culture Club Medley" – 6:49
  - "Do You Really Wanna Hurt Me" (Hay, Boy George, Craig, Moss) / "I'll Tumble 4 Ya" (Hay, George, Craig, Moss) / "It's a Miracle" (Hay, George, Craig, Moss, Pickett) / "Church of the Poison Mind" (Hay, George, Craig, Moss) / "Karma Chameleon" (Hay, George, Craig, Moss, Pickett)
5. "Total Eclipse of the Heart" (Steinman) – 3:03

Side two

1. "Flashdance Medley" – 6:35
  - (Flashdance... What a Feeling" (Forsey, Cara, Moroder) / "Fame" (Gore, Pitchford) / "Maniac" (Matkosky, Sembello) / "Footloose" (Loggins, Pitchford) / "Let's Hear It for the Boy" (Snow, Pitchford)
2. "Every Breath You Take" (Sting) – 3:26
3. "The Thompson Twins Medley" – 6:09
  - "Love On Your Side" (Bailey, Currie, Leeway) / "Doctor! Doctor!" (Bailey, Currie, Leeway) / "Sister of Mercy" (Sadkin, Bailey) / "You Take Me Up" (Sadkin, Bailey) / "Hold Me Now" (Bailey, Currie, Leeway)
4. "In Your Eyes" (Hill, Masser) – 3:18
5. "Lionel Richie Medley" – 5:07
  - "Truly" (Richie, Carmichael) / "All Night Long (All Night)" (Richie, Carmichael) / "Running with the Night" (Richie, Carmichael) / "Hello" (Richie, Carmichael)
