= I'm in the Mood Again =

Studio album by The Nolans
- Released: 2009
- Genre: Pop; dance-pop
- Label: Universal

The Nolans chronology
The Singles Collection (2006)	I'm in the Mood Again (2009)	The Nolans Sings J-Pop (2017)

I'm in the Mood Again is the fifteenth and final studio album by the Irish all-girl pop band The Nolans. Although eight people have been involved in the line up of the band, only four - Coleen, Linda, Maureen and Bernie - returned for this recording. The album consists of many "diva anthems" and also some of The Nolans' greatest hits. It was Bernie's final recording before her death in 2013. The album peaked at No. 22 on the UK Albums Chart.

The Nolans announced in June 2009 that they were reforming for a UK and Ireland tour. Four members - Coleen, Bernie, Linda and Maureen - undertook the tour, in October and November 2009. The two other sisters, Anne and Denise, were not involved.

The reunion sparked a split in the family as Anne has appeared in the press stating that she had been excluded from the tour despite being a long-serving member of the group. She also issued a statement on her official website, which included the comment: "they are not my sisters anymore." Denise also issued a statement in support of Anne, claiming that the real reason for the reunion was due to some of the sisters being in financial difficulty. The other four sisters have said that the decision was made by Universal, who sponsored the tour, due to this being the line-up that enjoyed the most success back in the early 1980s.

== Track listing ==
No.	Title	Writer(s)	Original artist	Length
1.	"I'm in the Mood for Dancing"	Ben Findon; Mike Myers; Bob Puzey	The Nolans	3:05
2.	"Chain Reaction"	Barry Gibb; Robin Gibb; Maurice Gibb	Diana Ross	3:57
3.	"It's Raining Men"	Paul Jabara; Paul Shaffer	The Weather Girls	3:37
4.	"Holding Out for a Hero"	Jim Steinman; Dean Pitchford	Bonnie Tyler	5:10
5.	"Chemistry"	Nicky Graham; Robin Smith	The Nolans	3:11
6.	"Valerie"	Abi Harding; Boyan Chowdhury; Dave McCabe; Russ Pritchard; Sean Payne	The Zutons	3:41
7.	"I Don't Feel Like Dancin'"	Elton John; Scott Hoffman; Jason Sellards	Scissor Sisters	4:11
8.	"Gotta Pull Myself Together"	Findon; Myers; Puzey	The Nolans	2:50
9.	"Mercy"	Aimée Ann Duffy; Steve Booker	Duffy	3:37
10.	"The Promise"	Miranda Cooper; Brian Higgins; Jason Resch; Kieran Jones; Carla Marie Williams	Girls Aloud	4:08
11.	"So What"	Alecia Beth Moore; Max Martin; Shellback	Pink	3:36
12.	"Crashin' Down"	Findon; Myers; Puzey	The Nolans	3:17
13.	"Attention to Me"	Findon; Myers; Puzey	The Nolans	3:38
14.	"Eternal Flame"	Susanna Hoffs; Tom Kelly; Billy Steinberg	The Bangles	3:52
15.	"Giving Up, Giving In"	Giorgio Moroder; Pete Belotte	The Three Degrees	3:59
16.	"I Will Survive"	Freddie Perren; Dino Fekaris	Gloria Gaynor	4:11

Lead vocals

- Bernie Nolan: 1, 8, 11-13
- Coleen Nolan: 2, 5, 14, 16
- Maureen Nolan: 6
- Linda Nolan: 9
- Maureen & Linda Nolan: 7
