= Maureen Nolan =

Irish singer-songwriter (born 1954)

- Born: 14 June 1954 (age 72); Dublin, Ireland
- Occupations: Singer, actress, television personality
- Years active: 1974–present
- Television: Top of the Pops; Loose Women
- Spouse: Richie Hoyle (div. 2016)
- Family: Anne Nolan (sister); Denise Nolan (sister); Linda Nolan (sister); Bernie Nolan (sister); Coleen Nolan (sister); Jake Roche (nephew)
- Website: www.nolansisters.com/maureennolan.htm

Maureen Nolan (born 14 June 1954) is an Irish born singer and TV personality. Maureen is best known for being one the original members of the Nolans.

== Biography ==
=== Early life ===
Nolan was born in Dublin, Ireland, to Tommy (26 September 1925 – 2 September 1998) and Maureen Nolan (15 December 1926 – 30 December 2007), as the fourth of eight children, including sisters Anne, Denise, Linda, Bernie and Coleen, and brothers Tommy and Brian, respectively. The family lived in Raheny, a suburb of Dublin, before moving to Blackpool, England, in 1962.

=== The Nolans ===
Maureen, along with her sisters, were a part of the singing group the Nolans. The Nolans had a number one hit in 1979 with their song "I'm in the Mood for Dancing". It charted at No. 2 on Irish music charts and was No. 1 on charts in Japan and South Africa. Sister Anne left the group between 1980 and 1982, with Coleen stepping in for her. They won the 1981 Tokyo Music Festival with their song "Sexy Music".

The Nolans reunited as a five-piece (including Bernie, Coleen, Linda and Maureen) for a one-off performance of "I'm In the Mood for Dancing" for BBC One's All Time Greatest Party Songs, hosted by Tess Daly, which aired on 17 December 2005. They performed the song again on 9 August 2007 on Loose Women, but dismissed any immediate prospect of a full-scale reunion. In 2009, Maureen joined her sisters for a reunion tour. The group reunited once again in 2020, when they reformed and remained in the group until its disbandment in 2022.

=== Later works ===
In February 2020, it was announced that Maureen and the Nolans would appear in a new TV series for Quest Red, The Nolans Go Cruising, a rival show to Channel 5's Cruising with Jane McDonald. Maureen Nolan still appears in stage, and theatre shows across the UK.

== Filmography ==
Year	Title	Role	Notes
1974	It’s Cliff Richard	Herself	Performer with The Nolans (2 Episodes)
1977	Seaside Special	Herself	Performer with The Nolans (2 Episodes)
1978	Multi-Coloured Swap Shop	Herself	Performer with The Nolans (2 Episodes)
1979	Mike Yarwood in Persons	Herself	Performer with The Nolans (6 Episodes)
1979-1981	Top of the Pops	Herself	Performer with The Nolans (15 Episodes)
1981-1982	The Nolans	Various Roles	Series Lead (4 Episodes)
1983-1985	Cheggers Plays Pop	Herself	Performer with The Nolans (8 Episodes)
1987	Filthy Rich & Catflap	Herself	Performer with The Nolans (1 Episode)
1993	The Ronson Mission	Herself	Guest (1 Episode)
1999, 2009, 2011	This Morning	Herself	Musical Performer (3 Episodes)
2000	Brookside	Maureen	Guest Role (1 Episode)
2007-2025	Loose Women	Herself	Guest Panelist (9 Episodes)
2009	Who Wants to be a Millionaire	Herself	Contestant (1 Episode)
2009	The Nolans: In the Mood for Dancing	Herself	Lead Contributor (Television Special)
2011	Daybreak	Herself	Guest (1 Episode)
2012	The One Show	Herself	Reporter (1 Episode)
2020-2021	The Nolans Go Cruising	Herself	Series Lead (All 14 Episodes)
2020	At Home with The Nolans	Herself	Series Lead (All 4 Episodes)
2021	Britain’s Favourite 80s Song	Nolan Sister	Contributor (2 Episodes)
2022	Greatest Pop Videos	Nolan Sister	Contributor (1 Episode)
