= Rock and Rolling Idol =

Studio album by The Nolans
- Released: 21 August 1991 (Japan)
- Recorded: 1991
- Studio: Berlin Studio Blackpool
- Genre: Pop; pop rock
- Label: Teichiku Records
- Producer: Clive Scott; Ray Hedges

The Nolans chronology
Playback Part 2 (1991)	Rock and Rolling Idol (1991)	Tidal Wave (Samishii Nettaigyo) (1991)

Singles from Rock and Rolling Idol
- 1. "Rock and Rolling Idol" Released: 21 August 1991

Rock and Rolling Idol (なんてったってアイドル, Nantetatte Aidoru; What an Idol) is the tenth album by the Irish pop group The Nolans. Released on 21 August 1991 exclusively in Japan by Teichiku Records, the album consists of ten English-language covers of songs made famous by Japanese idol Kyoko Koizumi.

The album peaked at No. 88 on Oricon's albums chart and sold over 15,000 copies.

== Track listing ==
All English lyrics are written by Clive Scott and Des Dyer.

No.	Title	Writer(s)	Lead vocals	Length
1.	"Rock and Rolling Idol" (Nantetatte Aidoru (なんてったってアイドル; "What an Idol"))	Yasushi Akimoto; Kyōhei Tsutsumi	Bernie Nolan	3:59
2.	"Japanese Girl" (Yamato Nadeshiko Shichihenge (ヤマトナデシコ七変化))	Chinfa Kan; Tsutsumi	Bernie Nolan	3:12
3.	"Daybreak" (Yoake no Mew (夜明けのMEW; "Mew at Dawn"))	Akimoto; Tsutsumi	Coleen Nolan	3:45
4.	"Darling My Love" (Adesugata Namida Musume (艶姿ナミダ娘; "Charming Tearful Girl"))	Kan; Kōji Makaino	Bernie Nolan	4:15
5.	"Fall in Love in Summertime" (Makka na Onna no Ko (まっ赤な女の子; "Girl in Red"))	Kan; Tsutsumi	Coleen Nolan	3:39
6.	"Ocean Girl" (Nagisa no Haikara Ningyo (渚のはいから人魚; "The Magical Mermaid by the Beach"))	Kan; Makaino	Bernie Nolan	4:04
7.	"Red Russian Rose" (Watashi no Jūrokusai (私の16才; "My 16-year-old"))	Noriko Maki; Eiji Takino	Coleen Nolan	3:42
8.	"Navy Blue" (Tokonatsu Musume (常夏娘; "Everlasting Summer Girl"))	Hifumi Midori; Kōhei Miyuki	Maureen Nolan	3:06
9.	"Stardust Memory"	Toshihiko Takamizawa; Ken Takahashi	Maureen Nolan	3:59
10.	"Ando Laura" (Meikyū no Andorōra (迷宮のアンドローラ; "Ando Laura in the Labyrinth"))	Takashi Matsumoto; Tsutsumi	Anne Nolan	3:24

== Charts ==
Chart (1991)	Peak position
Japanese Albums (Oricon)	88
