= Jake Roche =

English singer and actor (born 1992)

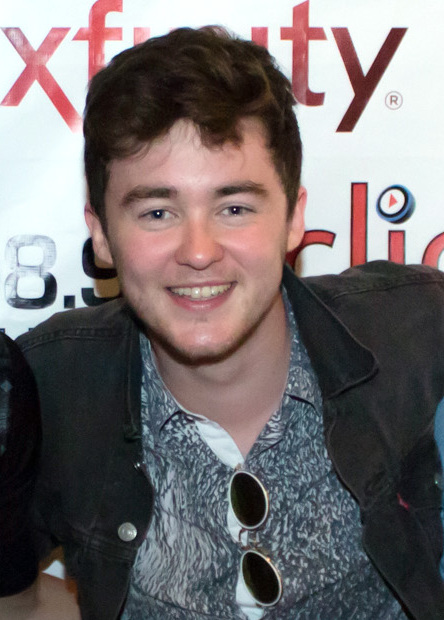
- Roche in 2014
- Born: Jake Peter Roche; 16 September 1992 (age 34); Reigate, Surrey, England
- Occupations: Singer; actor
- Years active: 2004–present
- Parent(s): Shane Richie; Coleen Nolan
- Relatives: Anne Nolan (aunt); Denise Nolan (aunt); Maureen Nolan (aunt); Linda Nolan (aunt); Bernie Nolan (aunt)
- Musical career
- Genres: Pop; R&B
- Instruments: Vocals; guitar
- Label: Interscope

Jake Peter Roche (born 16 September 1992) is an English singer and actor. He is known as the lead vocalist of the band Rixton (later known as Push Baby), charting at number 1 on the UK singles chart with "Me and My Broken Heart". In 2010, he appeared in the ITV soap opera Emmerdale, playing Isaac Nuttall.

== Early life ==
Born in Reigate, England in 1992, Roche is the son of actor Shane Richie and his then wife, singer and television personality Coleen Nolan. His parents divorced when he was nine years old. He has said about the divorce: "I remember seeing on the front pages about my dad cheating, but, as horrible as that was, we didn't fully understand because we were so young – so it’s not had this massive, damaging impact on us or anything."

He attended St Mary's Catholic College in Blackpool, prior to moving to London.

== Career ==
=== Acting ===
Roche trained at The Sylvia Young Theatre School for two years and appeared in the film Finding Neverland.

In 2010, he auditioned for the part of Isaac Nuttall in Emmerdale. Of the auditions he has said that he did not tell anyone who his parents were, Roche has said "I'd never go off mum and dad’s back because I wanted to know I could hold my own in a job like this." He was subsequently cast in the part and appeared on screens from August to October 2010.

He also appeared as Matt in the BBC musical film Rules of Love in 2010, and appeared briefly in drama Scott & Bailey in 2012.

In 2014, along with his band, he appeared on the Nickelodeon series The Haunted Hathaways as themselves.

=== Music ===
Roche is the frontman for the band Push Baby, formerly Rixton, a pop and R&B group signed by Scooter Braun's SB Projects. The members of Push Baby are Roche on vocals and rhythm guitar and Charley Bagnall.

Rixton's first music video was released in October 2013 entitled "Make Out", an upbeat song that lampoons famous music videos from Miley Cyrus, Katy Perry, Lady Gaga, Robin Thicke, Justin Bieber and Nicki Minaj, but it was never released as a single. Their first official single, "Me and My Broken Heart", is taken from their EP of the same name.

== Personal life ==
Jake has an older brother and younger maternal half sister as well as paternal half brother and sisters. Roche was in a relationship with Jesy Nelson from the girl group Little Mix.

== Filmography ==
Year	Title	Role	Notes
2004	Finding Neverland	Orphan	Film
2009–2015	Loose Women	Himself	6 episodes
2010	Emmerdale	Isaac Nuttall	12 episodes
2010	Rules of Love	Matt	Television film
2012	Friday Night Dinner	First policeman	1 episode
2012	Little Crackers	Paul McCartney	1 episode
2012–2013	Scott & Bailey	Sammy Murray	3 episodes
2014	The Haunted Hathaways	Himself	1 episode; with Rixton
2014	The Young Victorians	Henry	Television film
