= Please Don't =

Studio album by the Nolans
- Released: 23 September 1992 (Japan)
- Genre: Pop
- Label: Teichiku Records

The Nolans chronology
TV Memories for You III (1992)	Please Don't (1992)	Valentine Pops in Japan '93 (1993)

Please Don't (ふりむかないで, Furimukanaide, Don't Look Back) is the thirteenth studio album by the Irish pop group the Nolans. Released on 23 September 1992 exclusively in Japan by Teichiku Records, the album consists of 10 English-language covers of popular kayōkyoku songs from the 1960s.

== Track listing ==
No.	Title	Writer(s)	Original artist	Length
1.	"Please Don't" (Furimukanaide (ふりむかないで, "Don't Look Back"))	Tokiko Iwatani; Hiroshi Miyagawa	The Peanuts
2.	"White" (Shiroi Iroha Koibito no Iro (白い色は恋人の色, "White Is the Color of Lovers"))	Osamu Kitayama; Kazuhiko Katō	Betsy & Chris
3.	"Holiday Romance" (Koi no Bakansu (恋のバカンス, "Vacance de L'amour"))	Iwatani; Miyagawa	The Peanuts
4.	"Angel's Eyes" (Tenshi no Yūwaku (天使の誘惑, "An Angel's Temptation"))	Rei Nakanishi; Kunihiko Suzuki	Jun Mayuzumi
5.	"Dawn Song" (Yoake no Uta (夜明けのうた))	Iwatani; Taku Izumi	Yōko Kishi
6.	"First True Love" (Hatsukoi no Hito (初恋のひと))	Mieko Arima; Jun Suzuki	Tomoko Ogawa
7.	"Lonely Woman Alone" (Onna Hitori (女ひとり))	Rokusuke Ei; Izumi	Duke Aces
8.	"Looking for Love" (Ki'iroi Sakuranbo (黄色いさくらんぼ, "Yellow Colored Cherries"))	Tetsurō Hoshino; Kuranosuke Hamaguchi	Three Cats
9.	"Watch Good Love Go Bad" (Sotto Oyasumi (そっとおやすみ, "Soft Good Night"))	Kawachi Kuni	Akira Fuse
10.	"Place with No Name" (Jiyū no Daichi (自由の大地, "The Free Land"))	Katsuhisa Hattori	Katsuhisa Hattori

Lead vocals

- Bernie Nolan: 1, 3, 7
- Coleen Nolan: 2, 4, 5, 6
- Maureen Nolan: 9
- Anne Nolan: 10
- Bernie, Maureen, Anne Nolan: 8
