= The Cliffs Hotel =

Hotel in Blackpool, Lancashire, England

Coordinates: 53.83569°N 3.05433°W

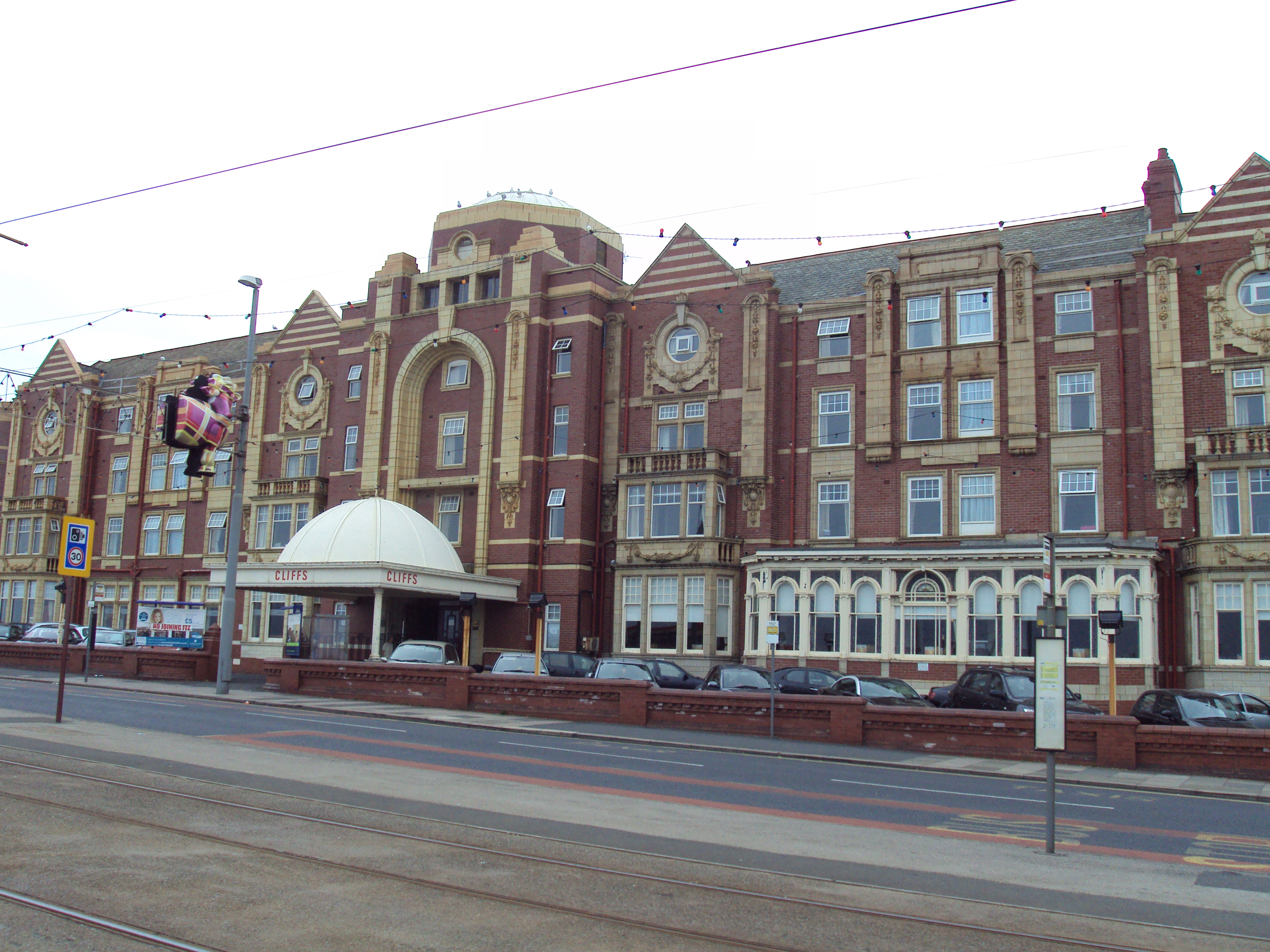

- Location within Blackpool

General information
- Location: Blackpool, Lancashire, England
- Opening: 1921
- Owner: Choice Hotels

Other information
- Number of rooms: 160

The Cliffs Hotel is in the seaside resort of Blackpool, Lancashire, It is located on the Queen's Promenade in the North Shore area of the town. The hotel was built in 1921. It is in the Baroque style and constructed of red brick and yellow terracotta. The gables have horizontal stripes. The Cliffs is owned by Choice Hotels Ltd and has 160 bedrooms.

== History ==
Architect Halstead Best enlarged the building 1936–37 and added an underground carpark, by which time the hotel encompassed the entire block between King Edward Avenue and Empress Drive. In 1959, it had 240 bedrooms, though this had reduced to 165 by 1971.
