= Ealing Fields High School =

Ealing Fields Church of England High School
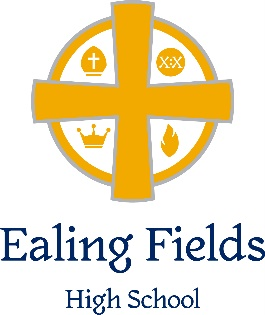
- The Manor building

Location
- Little Ealing Lane; Ealing, Greater London, W5 4EJ; England; 51.4967°N 0.3120°W

Information
- Type: Academy
- Religious affiliation: Church of England
- Established: 2016; 10 years ago
- Trust: Twyford CofE Academies Trust
- Department for Education URN: 142654 Tables
- Ofsted: Reports
- Associate Headteacher: Jo Trewin
- Gender: Coeducational
- Age: 11 to 16
- Capacity: 770
- Houses: Byron Chambers; McQueen; Perceval; Springfield Yeats
- Affiliation: Diocese of London
- Website: www.ealingfields.org.uk
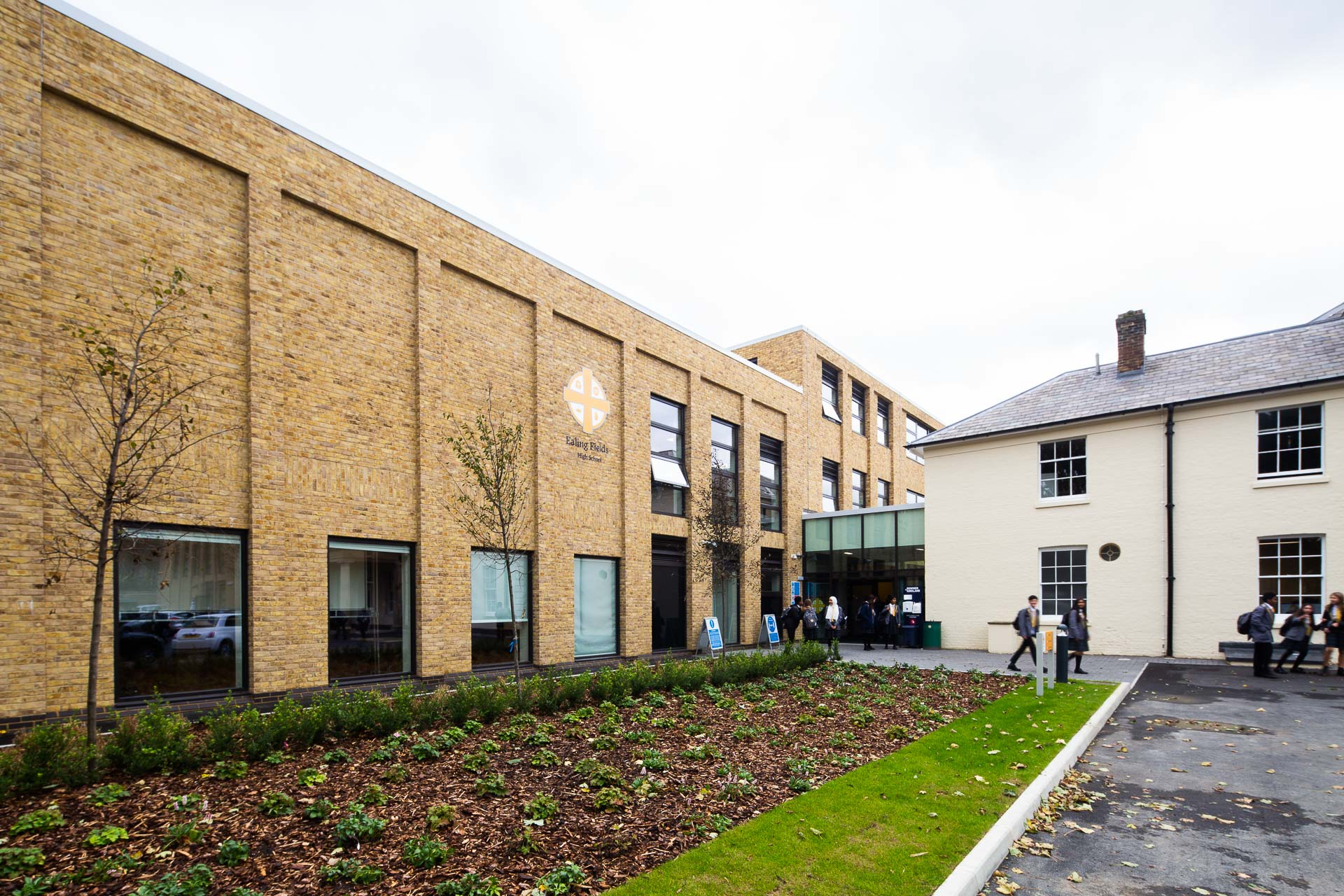
- New School Building

Ealing Fields CofE High School is a coeducational secondary school, located in Ealing, London. The school site is on a Grade II listed building with a set of new teaching buildings. It was opened as a Free school in 2016 and joined the Twyford CofE Academies Trust in 2017. Ealing Fields is currently rated 'Good' by Ofsted, with Outstanding features.

The school traces roots back to 1903, with the manor building originally used as a Roman Catholic home for girls, later becoming St Anne's Convent School for Girls. The singer Dusty Springfield was a pupil there in the 1950s. There is now a green Ealing Civil Society plaque at the entrance to the school.

== History ==
Ealing Fields was opened as a Free School in 2016 by a group of parents to provide a new school for South Ealing. Ealing Fields became part of the Twyford CofE Academies Trust on 1 September 2017. Ealing Fields is the smallest of the Trust's schools, with an intake of 150 Year 7 pupils each year.

The creation of Ealing Fields High School involved the refurbishment of a Grade II listed manor and servants' quarters, along with substantial new build elements, to become a new secondary school in West London.

The manor was originally called 'Place House' and was built in the 1600s. Later owners included William and Louisa Lawrence (nee Senior) who were leaders in surgery and botany.

During the building phase, Boris Johnson visited. New buildings consist of a main teaching block and sports hub with community access. The design is in keeping with the existing heritage with large areas of brickwork, portrait windows, and brick piers and detailing around entrances.

In 2025, the school became a Church of England school, like the others in the trust.

== Academia ==
Each pupil is a member of one of six houses. The house groups are as follows:

- Byron - Red (Lady Byron, Education)
- Chambers - Yellow (Dorothea Chambers, Sport)
- McQueen - Green (Steve McQueen, Media)
- Perceval - Light Blue (Spencer Perceval, Prime Minister)
- Springfield - Dark Blue (Dusty Springfield, Singer)
- Yeats - Purple (W. B. Yeats, Poet)

The houses are named after well-known citizens from Ealing.

== Notable alumni ==
- Dusty Springfield
