= Playback Part 2 (album) =

Studio album by The Nolans
- Released: 21 July 1991 (Japan)
- Recorded: 1991
- Studio: Berlin Studio Blackpool
- Genre: Pop; pop rock
- Length: 38:24
- Label: Teichiku Records
- Producer: Clive Scott; Ray Hedges

The Nolans chronology
Tenderly (1986)	Playback Part 2 (1991)	Rock and Rolling Idol (1991)

Singles from Playback Part 2
- 1. "Take Me All" Released: 21 July 1991

Playback Part 2 (プレイバック Part 2, Pureibakku Pātsu Tsū) is the ninth studio album by the Irish pop group The Nolans. Released on 21 July 1991 exclusively in Japan by Teichiku Records, the album consists of 10 English-language covers of songs made famous by Japanese idol Momoe Yamaguchi.

The album peaked at No. 77 on Oricon's albums chart and sold over 12,000 copies.

== Track listing ==
All lyrics are written by Clive Scott, Des Dyer, and Yoko Aki, except where indicated; all music is composed by Ryudo Uzaki, except where indicated

No.	Title	Lyrics	Music	Lead vocals	Length
1.	"Imitation Gold" (Imiteishon Gōrudo (イミテイション・ゴールド))			Bernie Nolan	3:14
2.	"Yokosuka Story" (Yokosuka Sutōrī (横須賀ストーリー))			Coleen Nolan	3:47
3.	"Autumn Cherry Cosmos" (Kosumosu (秋桜（コスモス）, "Cosmos"))	Scott; Dyer; Masashi Sada	Sada	Bernie Nolan	3:32
4.	"Playback Part 2" (Pureibakku Pātsu Tsū (プレイバック Part 2))			Bernie Nolan	3:19
5.	"My Dream" (Yumesaki Annainin (夢先案内人, "Dream Guide"))			Maureen Nolan	4:00
6.	"Rock 'n' Roll Widow" (Rokkunrōru Uidō (ロックンロール・ウィドウ))			Bernie Nolan	3:53
7.	"Take Me All" (Hito Natsu no Keiken (ひと夏の経験, "An Experience One Summer"))	Scott; Dyer; Kazuya Senke	Shunichi Tokura	Maureen & Coleen Nolan	2:34
8.	"Days That Used to Be" (Ii Hi Tabidachi (いい日旅立ち, "Leaving on a Good Day"))	Scott; Dyer; Shinji Tanimura	Tanimura	Anne Nolan	4:16
9.	"It's Easy When You're in Love" (Otomeza Kyū (乙女座 宮, "The Virgo Constellation"))			Anne Nolan	3:58
10.	"I'll Never Say Goodbye" (Sayonara no Mukōgawa (さよならの向う側, "The Other Side of Goodbye"))			Maureen Nolan	5:51
Total length:					38:24

== Charts ==
Chart (1991)	Peak position
Japanese Albums (Oricon)	77

== See also ==
- The Nolans Sing Momoe 2005
