= Linda Nolan =

Irish singer and actress (1959–2025)

- Nolan in 2014
- Born: Linda Mary Monica Nolan; 23 February 1959; Dublin, Ireland
- Died: 15 January 2025 (aged 65); Blackpool, Lancashire, England
- Occupations: Singer; actress; author; television personality
- Years active: 1974–2025
- Television: Top of the Pops; Celebrity Big Brother; Loose Women
- Spouse: Brian Hudson (m. 1981; died 2007)
- Family: Anne Nolan (sister); Denise Nolan (sister); Maureen Nolan (sister); Bernie Nolan (sister); Coleen Nolan (sister); Jake Roche (nephew)

Linda Mary Monica Hudson (née Nolan; 23 February 1959 – 15 January 2025) was an Irish singer, actress, and television personality.

After moving with her family to Blackpool at the age of three in 1962, she attained fame as a member of the girl group the Nolans in 1974, along with her sisters Anne, Denise, Maureen, Bernie, and Coleen. As a member of the Nolans, she toured with Frank Sinatra in 1975, won the Tokyo Music Festival in 1981, and had seven UK top-20 hits between 1979 and 1982.

Soon after leaving the group, Nolan supported Gene Pitney on his 1984 UK tour. She then went on to perform in theatre, including an eight-season residency as Maggie May on Blackpool's Central Pier (1986–1993), where she clocked up over 1,000 performances, followed by two seasons as Rosie O'Grady on Blackpool's South Pier (1994–1995). She reunited with the Nolans for the 2009 I'm in the Mood Again album and tour, and in 2014, she took part in the 13th series of Celebrity Big Brother. In 2018, she was a recurring guest panellist on Loose Women.

== Early life ==
Linda Mary Monica Nolan was born on 23 February 1959 in Holles Street Hospital in Dublin, Ireland, the sixth of eight children born to Tommy and Maureen Nolan. The family lived in Raheny, a north side suburb of Dublin, before moving to Blackpool in 1962, when Tommy and Maureen formed the Singing Nolans, of which Linda was a member. She went to school at Blackpool's St Catherine's Catholic Secondary School, and also attended The Cardinal Wiseman School in Greenford, west London.

== Career ==
=== The Nolans ===
In 1981, Nolan scored a minor hit with her sister Coleen as part of the Young & Moody Band, with "Don't Do That" (UK number 63), which also featured Lemmy from Motörhead and Cozy Powell.

She left The Nolans in December 1983 and quickly gained the label "Naughty Nolan" due to her posing in risqué publicity photos. The Nolans reunited as a five-piece (Bernie, Anne, Coleen, Maureen, and Linda) for one-off performances of "I'm in the Mood for Dancing" first for BBC One's All Time Greatest Party Songs, hosted by Tess Daly, which aired on 17 December 2005 and again on 9 August 2007 on Loose Women.

Four of the sisters (Linda, Bernie, Coleen, and Maureen) reunited in 2009 for a successful tour of the UK and Ireland. They also released an album I'm in the Mood Again, which reached number 22 on the UK Albums Chart.

=== Theatre work and television ===
On leaving the group, Nolan went on to play the role of Maggie May at Blackpool's Central Pier for eight summer seasons (1986–1993), completing more than 1,000 performances.

From 1996 to 1997, Nolan starred as the prison governor in two UK tours of Prisoner: Cell Block H – The Musical, alongside Paul O'Grady.

From 2000, Nolan starred as Mrs Johnstone in Blood Brothers for three years in the West End, and regularly played the role in the UK touring production until 2008. She was the third Nolan sister to play the role, after Bernie and Denise. Maureen Nolan has also since played the role in the West End on the UK tour for several years, earning the sisters a place in the Guinness World Records, as the most siblings to play the same role in a musical. Nolan also appeared on Blankety Blank, with sister Anne and niece Alex on Celebrity Pressure Pad and with sister Bernie on Pointless Celebrities.

In January 2014, Nolan participated in the 13th series of Celebrity Big Brother. Prior to this, her sister Coleen had participated in and achieved second place in the 10th series.

Jim Davidson, who was also a contestant in the house that year, had history with Linda Nolan; in 1995, Nolan's husband Brian Hudson was caught red-handed stealing money from comic Frank Carson's dressing room at the South Pier Theatre Blackpool. This raised the ire of Davidson, who was playing up the road at the time. He lost his temper, yelling, "no one steals from my mates", and threatening to punch Hudson. Davidson was promptly thrown out of the nightclub. On Day 15, Davidson reminded Nolan of her husband's antics, prompting an argument. She was evicted on Day 22.

== Personal life ==
Nolan met Brian Hudson in 1979 and they married in 1981. He was the Nolans' tour manager until 1983 and became Linda's manager after she left the group. They were married for 26 years until his death on 21 September 2007, from liver failure.

In July 2014, Nolan claimed that she was sexually assaulted by Rolf Harris in 1975 while the Nolans were supporting Harris in a tour of South Africa.

=== Illness and death ===
In 2005, Nolan was diagnosed with breast cancer. As part of her treatment, she underwent a single mastectomy in 2006. She was given the all-clear from cancer in 2011. In 2007, she was diagnosed with cellulitis and lymphedema in her arm.

In 2017, Nolan fell on her hip and was taken to hospital, where doctors discovered a form of incurable secondary breast cancer on her pelvis. She began undergoing regular radiotherapy treatment to make sure that the cancer would not spread, but said that she would reject chemotherapy if the cancer were found to be terminal, after seeing how her sister Bernie was in pain from her chemotherapy shortly before Bernie's death in 2013. In 2020, Nolan stated that the cancer had spread to her liver. On 27 March 2023, she stated that the cancer had now metastasised to her brain, with a tumour discovered on the left side of her brain, resulting in balance loss on her right side, which led to her using a wheelchair. She was prescribed the experimental drug Tucatinib to treat her brain cancer followed by Enhertu.

In January 2025, Nolan was admitted to Blackpool Victoria Hospital with double pneumonia and subsequently fell into a coma. She died on the morning of 15 January 2025, aged 65.

== Selected Filmography ==
Year	Title	Role	Notes
1974	It's Cliff Richard!	Performer	Series regular
1979	Mike Yarwood In Persons	Performer	Series regular
1979–1982	Top of the Pops	Performer	15 episodes
1984–1989	Blankety Blank	Panellist	7 episodes
1999	Never Mind the Buzzcocks	Mystery guest	1 episode
2003	We Are Family	Contributor	Documentary
2004	Saturday Night Takeaway	Herself	1 episode
2005	All Time Greatest Party Songs	Performer	1 episode
2009	The Paul O'Grady Show	Performer	1 episode
2009	The Nolans: In the Mood For Dancing	Herself	Documentary
2009	The Late Late Show	Performer	1 episode
2011	Come Dine With Me	Participant	5 episodes
2010–2012	The One Show	Reporter	3 episodes
2012–2014	Big Brother's Bit on the Side	Panellist	13 episodes
2014	Celebrity Big Brother	Participant	24 episodes
2014	Most Shocking Celebrity Moments	Contributor	Documentary
2016	The Seven O'Clock Show	Guest	1 episodes
2018	The Wright Stuff	Panellist	2 episodes
2006–2018	Lorraine	Guest	7 episodes
2007, 2018	Loose Women	Guest/Performer/Panellist	20 episodes
2018–2019	Jeremy Vine	Panellist	3 episodes

== Selected Theatre Credits ==
Year	Title	Role	Notes
1986–1993	Maggie May's	Title role	Central Pier, Blackpool
1994–1995	Rosie O'Grady's	Title role	South Pier, Blackpool
1996–1997	Prisoner Cell Block H: The Musical	Prison Governor	UK tour
2000–2008	Blood Brothers	Mrs Johnstone	West End (2000–03) / UK tour (2003–08)
2015–2016	Menopause The Musical	The Soap Star	Irish & UK tours
2016	Rumpy Pumpy!	Madame Holly Spencer	Union Theatre, London
