= Denise Nolan =

Irish singer (born 1952)

- Born: 6 April 1952 (age 74); Dublin, Ireland
- Occupation: Singer
- Years active: 1974–present
- Television: This Morning; Loose Women; The Nolans Go Cruising; At Home with the Nolans
- Spouse: Tom Anderson (m. 2024)
- Family: Anne Nolan (sister); Maureen Nolan (sister); Linda Nolan (sister); Bernie Nolan (sister); Coleen Nolan (sister); Jake Roche (nephew)
- Website: www.denisenolan.co.uk

Denise Nolan (born 6 April 1952) is an Irish singer and theatre performer. She is a member of the Nolans.

== Biography ==
=== Early life ===
Nolan was born in Dublin, Ireland, on 6 April 1952, the third of eight children born to Tommy (26 September 1925 – 1998) and Maureen Nolan (15 December 1926 – 30 December 2007), who also had Anne, Maureen, Linda, Bernie and Coleen, plus Tommy and Brian. The family lived in Raheny, a suburb of Dublin, before moving to Blackpool, England in 1962.

=== The Nolans ===
Nolan, alongside her sisters, was part of the singing group The Nolan Sisters. With them, she achieved fame throughout the 1970s, including a top-three album. In 1978, she left the group to start a solo career, performing in cabaret and on board cruise ships, and supporting major acts on their national UK tours. She also had a successful panto career, appearing in more than 25 productions.

=== Later works ===
Nolan starred in London's musical Blood Brothers as Mrs Johnson.

In February 2020, it was announced that Nolan and her sisters would appear in a new TV series for Quest Red, The Nolans Go Cruising, a rival show to Channel 5's award-winning Cruising with Jane McDonald. Nolan appeared in the second series, in which she performed both solo and as part of the group.

In 2022, Nolan released her debut album, For You, My Love, singing songs from the Great American Songbook and Frank Sinatra.

== Personal life ==
Nolan has been in a relationship with musician Tom Anderson since 1977. The couple live between Blackpool and Los Angeles, and got married in June 2024.

== Discography ==
=== Studio albums ===
Year	Title	Details
1972	The Singing Nolans	Released: June 1972; Label: Nevis; Formats: LP
1975	The Nolan Sisters	Released: 1975; Label: Hanover Grand; Formats: LP
1978	20 Giant Hits	Released: 7 July 1978; Label: Target; Formats: LP, MC; Released in Japan in February 1981

=== Singles ===
Single	Year
"Blackpool" (as the Singing Nolans)	1972
"But I Do" (as the Nolan Sisters)	1974
"(Won't You) Make a Little Sunshine Shine" (as Nolan Sisters)	1975
"Rain" (as the Nolan Sisters)	1976
"Thanks for Calling" (as Nolan Sisters)	1976
"When You Are a King" (as the Nolan Sisters)	1976
"Love Transformation" (as Nolan Sisters)	1977
"Love Bandit" (as Nolan Sisters)	1977
"Don't It Make My Brown Eyes Blue" (as the Nolan Sisters)	1978

== Filmography ==
Year	Title	Role	Notes
1974	It’s Cliff Richard	Herself	Performer with The Nolans (2 Episodes)
1977	Seaside Special	Herself	Performer with The Nolans (2 Episodes)
1978	Multi-Coloured Swap Shop	Herself	Performer with The Nolans (2 Episodes)
1982	The Les Dawson Show	Herself	Guest (1 Episode)
1982	Give Us a Clue	Herself	Guest Panelist (1 Episode)
1985	Names and Games	Herself	Guest (1 Episode)
1994	Win, Lose or Draw (British game show)	Herself	Panelist (5 Episodes)
1999	This Morning	Herself	Contributor (1 Episode)
2000	Brookside	Denise	Guest Role (1 Episode)
2017, 2020	Loose Women	Herself	Guest Panelist (2 Episodes)
2020	At Home with the Nolans	Herself	Series Lead (All 4 Episodes)
2021	The Nolans Go Cruising	Herself	Series Lead (All 6 Episodes)
2025	Good Morning Britain	Herself	Guest (1 Episode)
