= Tidal Wave (Samishii Nettaigyo) =

Studio album by The Nolans
- Released: 21 September 1991 (Japan)
- Recorded: 1991
- Studio: Clive Scott; Ray Hedges
- Genre: Pop; pop rock
- Length: 46:32
- Label: Teichiku Records
- Producer: Clive Scott; Ray Hedges

The Nolans chronology
Rock and Rolling Idol (1991)	Tidal Wave (Samishii Nettaigyo) (1991)	Christmas Pops in Japan (1991)

Singles from Tidal Wave (Samishii Nettaigyo)
- 1. "Tidal Wave" Released: 21 September 1991

Tidal Wave (Samishii Nettaigyo) (淋しい熱帯魚, Lonely Tropical Fish) is the eleventh studio album by the Irish pop group The Nolans. Released on 21 September 1991 exclusively in Japan by Teichiku Records, the album consists of 12 English-language covers of popular J-pop songs from the 1970s and 1980s. The title track, a cover of Wink's "Samishii Nettaigyo", was released as a single.

The album peaked at No. 99 on Oricon's albums chart and sold over 3,000 copies.

== Track listing ==
All English lyrics are written by Clive Scott and Des Dyer except track 1 by M. Jordan.

No.	Title	Writer(s)	Original artist	Length
1.	"Never Ending Wind" (Kaze Tachinu (風立ちぬ, "The Wind Rises"))	Takashi Matsumoto; Eiichi Ohtaki	Seiko Matsuda	4:27
2.	"Tidal Wave" (Samishii Nettaigyo (淋しい熱帯魚, "Lonely Tropical Fish"))	Neko Oikawa; Masaya Ozeki	Wink	4:28
3.	"Desire" (Dezaia (Jōnetsu) (DESIRE～情熱～))	Yoko Aki; Kisaburō Suzuki	Akina Nakamori	4:39
4.	"Wait for Me" (Nagisa no Barukonī (渚のバルコニー, "The Balcony by the Beach"))	Matsumoto; Karuho Kureta	Seiko Matsuda	3:40
5.	"Tears" (Kazari ja Nai no yo Namida wa (飾りじゃないのよ涙は, "The Tears Are Not a Decoration"))	Yōsui Inoue	Akina Nakamori	4:05
6.	"Toy Boy" (Toshishita no Otokonoko (年下の男の子, "Younger Boy"))	Kazuya Senke; Yūsuke Hoguchi	Candies	3:26
7.	"Sweet Little Devil" (Yasashii Akuma (やさしい悪魔))	Makoto Kitajō; Takuro Yoshida	Candies	3:36
8.	"Roppongi Street" (Roppongi Junjōha (六本木純情派る, "Roppongi Pure-Heart Clique"))	Masao Urino; Akihiro Yoshimi	Yōko Oginome	3:28
9.	"Blue Heaven" (Tengoku no Kissu (天国のキッス, "Heavenly Kiss"))	Matsumoto; Haruomi Hosono	Seiko Matsuda	3:59
10.	"Ace of Hearts" (Hāto no Ēsu ga Detekonai (ハートのエースが出てこない))	Machiko Ryū; Kōichi Morita	Candies	3:07
11.	"Simple Handkerchief" (Momen no Hankachīfu (木綿のハンカチーフ, "Cotton Handkerchief"))	Matsumoto; Kyōhei Tsutsumi	Hiromi Ōta	3:47
12.	"Johnny" (Jā ne (じゃあね, "See Ya"))	Yasushi Akimoto; Ken Takahashi	Onyanko Club	3:54
Total length:				46:32

== Charts ==
Chart (1991)	Peak position
Japanese Albums (Oricon)	99
