= I'm in the Mood for Dancing =

- Side A of the Irish single

Single by The Nolan Sisters

from the album Nolan Sisters
- B-side: "Let's Make Love"
- Released: December 1979
- Genre: Pop; disco
- Length: 3:16
- Label: Epic
- Songwriters: Ben Findon; Mike Myers; Bob Puzey
- Producers: Ben Findon; Mike Myers

The Nolan Sisters singles chronology
"Spirit, Body and Soul" (1979)	"I'm in the Mood for Dancing" (1979)	"Don't Make Waves" (1980)

Music video
- "I'm In the Mood for Dancing" on YouTube

"I'm in the Mood for Dancing" is a single by the Irish pop group The Nolan Sisters (later to become The Nolans). Originally released in December 1979, the song became a top-three hit in the UK in February 1980. A blend of pop and disco, it has since become synonymous with the group and remains their biggest hit. It was also a hit in many countries around the world. In Japan and South Africa, it reached number one.

== Song information ==
The song was originally recorded as part of the Nolan Sisters' first mainstream pop album, simply titled Nolan Sisters in 1979. It was written by Ben Findon, Mike Myers and Bob Puzey, and featured lead vocals by member Bernie Nolan.

The group recorded a promotional video for the song, which featured youngest sister Coleen even though she was not an official member at the time and was not featured on the recording. Soon after the release of this song, the group changed their name to The Nolans and Coleen became a full-time member, replacing eldest sister Anne.

== Chart performance ==
The song became the second single from the album, following the group's first UK top 40 hit, "Spirit, Body and Soul" some weeks earlier. After a slow start in the charts, the single became their first top 10 hit in January 1980, eventually peaking at number 3 during a 15-week chart run. The single was certified Gold by the BPI.

"I'm in the Mood for Dancing" charted well elsewhere, particularly so in Japan, where it reached number 1 - a rarity for English-language songs at the time, and began a run of success for the group there. Released as "Dancing Sisters" (ダンシング・シスター, Danshingu Shisutā), it remained at No. 1 for two weeks in 1980 and sold 670,000 copies. Eventually, the group recorded a version of the song in Japanese.

The group has re-recorded the song a number of times, with two further single releases of the song in the UK. Firstly in 1989 and again in 1995 - both times reaching the lower regions of the charts. In 2009, The Nolans reunited and embarked on a UK and Ireland tour in honour of the 30th anniversary of "I'm in the Mood for Dancing", with the tour and accompanying album titled I'm in the Mood Again.

== Track listing ==
1979 Epic Records single (produced by Ben Findon)
No.	Title	Writer(s)	Length
1.	"I'm in the Mood for Dancing"	Ben Findon; Mike Myers; Bob Puzey	3:16
2.	"Let's Make Love"	Findon; Myers	2:56

1989 A.1. Records single (produced by Barry Upton)
No.	Title	Writer(s)	Length
1.	"I'm in the Mood for Dancin' 89"	Findon; Myers; Puzey	6:45
2.	"No Question"	Upton	4:30

1995 Living Beat Records single (produced by Clive Scott and Ray Hedges)
No.	Title	Writer(s)	Length
1.	"I'm in the Mood for Dancing" (From Hell Radio Edit)	Findon; Myers; Puzey	3:10
2.	"I'm in the Mood for Dancing" (From Hell Club Mix)	Findon; Myers; Puzey	5:05
3.	"I'm in the Mood for Dancing" (Original Version)	Findon; Myers; Puzey	3:00
4.	"Somebody Loves You"	Scott; Hedges	3:55

== Charts ==
=== Weekly charts ===
Chart (1979–1980)	Peak position
Australia (Kent Music Report)	43
Belgium (Joepie)	1
Belgium (Ultratop 50 Flanders)	4
Denmark (Hitlisten)	4
Ireland (IRMA)	2
Japan (Oricon)	1
Netherlands (Dutch Top 40)	2
Netherlands (Single Top 100)	3
New Zealand (Recorded Music NZ)	5
South Africa (Springbok)	1
UK Singles (Official Charts)	3
West Germany (GfK)	74

=== Year-end charts ===
Chart (1980)	Position
Belgium (Ultratop Flanders)	30
Netherlands (Dutch Top 40)	36
Netherlands (Single Top 100)	31
New Zealand (Recorded Music NZ)	21
South Africa (Springbok)	13
UK Singles (OCC)	27

== Other versions ==
Japanese idol duo Wink covered the song in Japanese as "Ginsei Club (I'm in Mood for Dancing)" (銀星倶楽部 〜I'm In Mood For Dancing〜) on their 1990 album Velvet.

tommy february6 covered the song on her single je t'aime ★ je t'aime(2003). Audio.

The song is heavily sampled in the 2018 Czech hit song Zlatíčka. Music video.

In December 2020, a modern cover recorded by South Korean singer-songwriter Yuju was released as part of the soundtrack for Korean Romantic Comedy Drama True Beauty. It charted on South Korea's Gaon Download Chart, peaking at number 182 during the week commencing December 13, 2020, which led Coleen Nolan to praise the subsequent renewed interest the cover gave The Nolans in the country.

In April 2021 Australian record labels DWP Records and Odessa Mama Records jointly released their own pop dance version of “I’m in the Mood for Dancing” by studio group Lucky Kiss. Produced and mixed by David Wilks and David Faiman. The Lucky Kiss version of the song is arranged all in one key (C Major) whereas The Nolan’s and Yuju versions of the song move between two keys (shifting up a minor third in sections).

== See also ==
- 1980 in music
- List of best-selling singles in Japan
- Big in Japan
