= The Nolans Sing Momoe 2005 =

Studio album by The Nolans
- Released: 19 January 2005 (Japan)
- Recorded: 2004
- Genre: Pop; pop rock
- Label: Sony Music Direct

The Nolans chronology
New Best Hits and More (1997)	The Nolans Sing Momoe 2005 (2005)	The Singles Collection (2006)

The Nolans Sing Momoe 2005 (ノーランズ シング 百恵 2005, Nōranzu Shingu Momoe 2005) is a cover album by the Irish pop group The Nolans. Released on 19 January 2005 exclusively in Japan by Sony Music Direct, the album is a re-recording of the group's 1991 cover album Playback Part 2 to commemorate the 25th retirement anniversary of Japanese idol Momoe Yamaguchi. It was released in two editions: CD only and a limited edition CD + DVD set.

== Track listing ==
All lyrics are written by Clive Scott, Des Dyer, and Yoko Aki, except where indicated; all music is composed by Ryudo Uzaki, except where indicated.

CD
No.	Title	Lyrics	Music	Length
1.	"I'll Never Say Goodbye" (Sayonara no Mukōgawa (さよならの向う側, "The Other Side of Goodbye"))			5:50
2.	"Rock 'n' Roll Widow" (Rokkunrōru Uidō (ロックンロール・ウィドウ))			3:42
3.	"Days That Used to Be" (Ii Hi Tabidachi (いい日旅立ち, "Leaving on a Good Day"))	Scott; Dyer; Shinji Tanimura	Tanimura	4:15
4.	"Playback Part 2" (Pureibakku Pātsu Tsū (プレイバック Part 2))			3:19
5.	"It's Easy When You're in Love" (Otomeza Kyū (乙女座 宮, "The Virgo Constellation"))			3:59
6.	"Autumn Cherry Cosmos" (Kosumosu (秋桜（コスモス）, "Cosmos"))	Scott; Dyer; Masashi Sada	Sada	3:37
7.	"Imitation Gold" (Imiteishon Gōrudo (イミテイション・ゴールド))			3:15
8.	"My Dream" (Yumesaki Annainin (夢先案内人, "Dream Guide"))			4:02
9.	"Yokosuka Story" (Yokosuka Sutōrī (横須賀ストーリー))			3:48
10.	"Take Me All" (Hito Natsu no Keiken (ひと夏の経験, "An Experience One Summer"))	Scott; Dyer; Kazuya Senke	Shunichi Tokura	2:06

Limited Edition DVD
No.	Title	Length
1.	"Play Back Part 2" (Live performance on NTV Super Jockey, 17 November 1991)
