= Teichiku Records =

Japanese record company

Teichiku Entertainment, Inc.
- Company type: KK
- Industry: music (record label)
- Predecessor: Standard Talking Machine Company of Japan
- Founded: February 11, 1934 (as Teikoku Chikuonki Kabushiki-gaisha); Nara Prefecture, Empire of Japan
- Headquarters: Minato, Tokyo, Japan
- Owner: XING Inc. (100%)
- Parent: Brother Industries
- Website: teichiku.co.jp

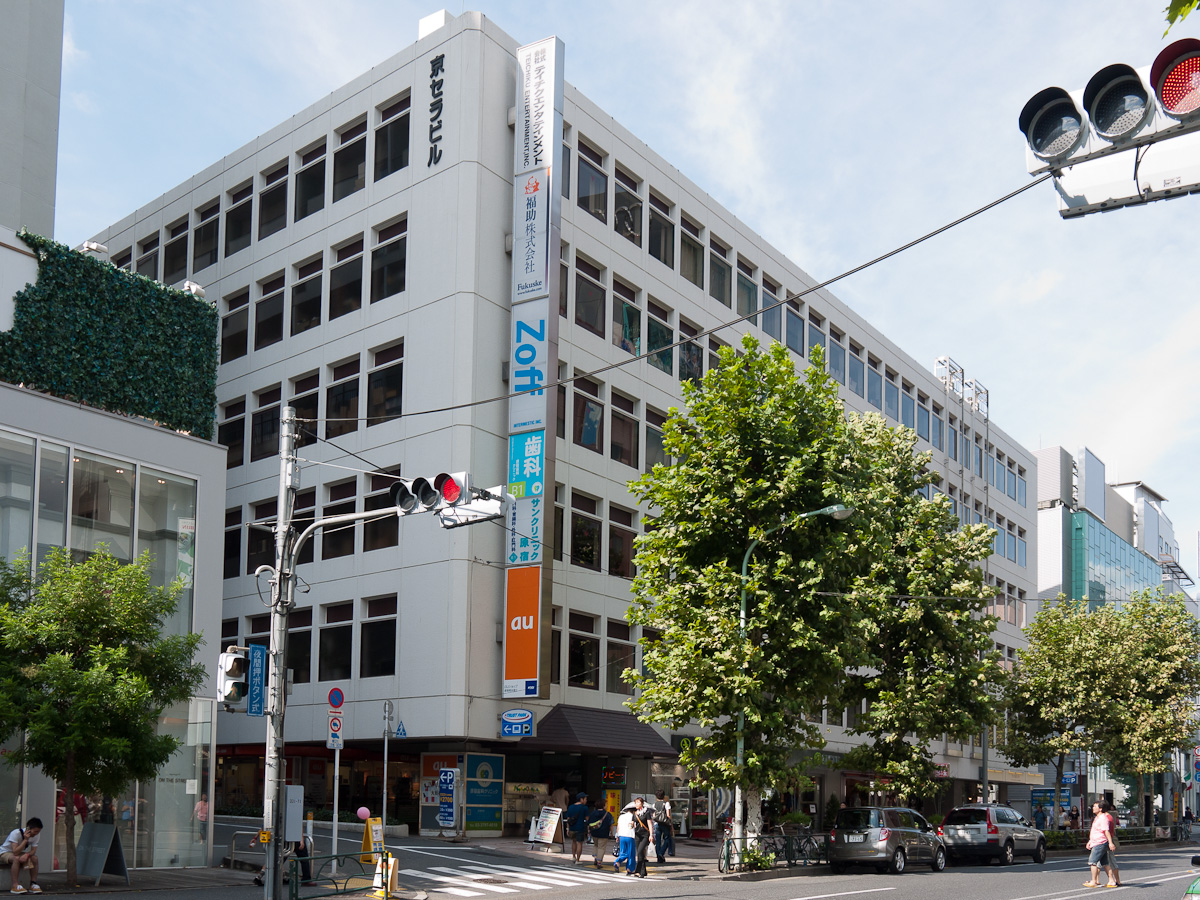
The Kyocera Harajuku building in September 2011

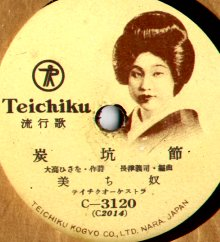
Label from Michiyakko's 1950 recording of the Tankō Bushi

Teichiku Records (テイチクレコード, Teichiku Rekōdo) is a Japanese record label, run by Teichiku Entertainment (テイチクエンタテインメント, Teichiku Entateinmento), that specializes in enka, kayōkyoku, and similar music. Teichiku is an abbreviation for Teikoku Chikuonki (帝国蓄音機; lit. Imperial Records), the former name of the company. (Note: English names: Imperial Graphophone Company Limited, Teikoku Gramophone Company Limited) Teichiku Entertainment also runs the record labels Imperial Records, Takumi Note, and Union Records (ユニオンレコード, Yunion Rekōdo). It is a division of commercial karaoke manufacturer XING Inc., itself a subsidiary of Brother Industries.

In the past, it also produced video games, such as God Panic: Shijō Saikyō Gundan.

== Offices of Teichiku Entertainment, Inc. ==
- Head office - Shiba Park Building, 2-4-1, Shiba koen, Minato-ku, Tokyo, Japan
- Osaka office - Sankyu Building, 2-14, Azuchimachi Sanchome, Chūō-ku, Osaka, Japan

== History ==
- February 11, 1934 - Teikoku Chikuonki Company (帝国蓄音機株式会社) was founded in Nara, Japan.
- September 1951 - Contracted with Decca Records.
- February 1952 - Started to sell Decca records.
- February 11, 1953 - Teikoku Chikuonki was renamed Teichiku, Inc. (テイチク株式会社). In the same year, the company began using magnetic tape for recording.
- 1954 - Began selling LP records and EP records.
- 1969 - Termination of contract with Decca.
- 1999 - Tokyo head office moved from Aobadai, Meguroku to Jingumae, Shibuya and the company was renamed Teichiku Entertainment, Inc. (株式会社テイチクエンタテインメント)".
- April 28, 2015 - JVC Kenwood Holdings sells their majority stake of Teichiku to commercial karaoke manufacturer XING Inc (subsidiary of Brother Industries).
- August, 2017 - Tokyo head office moved from Jingumae, Shibuya to XING Inc. headquarters in Minato-ku.
- March, 2025 - Teichiku signs a worldwide distribution deal with Believe Music.

== See also ==
- List of record labels
- JVCKenwood Victor Entertainment
