= Momoe Yamaguchi discography =

Momoe Yamaguchi discography discography
- Studio albums: 22
- Live albums: 6
- Compilation albums: 43
- Box sets: 9
- Video albums: 5
- Soundtrack albums: 8
- Tribute albums: 2

The albums discography of Japanese recording artist Momoe Yamaguchi consists of 22 studio albums, 43 compilation albums, 11 cover albums, six live albums and nine box set.

To date, Yamaguchi has sold more than 16,22 million records nationwide. She has 4 No. 1 singles, being the nineteenth best-selling artist in Japan of all time.

== Studio albums ==
List of albums, with selected chart positions
Title	Album details	Peak positions	Sales (JPN)	Certifications
Title	Album details	JPN Oricon	Sales (JPN)	Certifications
Toshigoro (としごろ)	Released: August 21, 1973; Label: CBS Cony; Formats: CD, LP, cassette, digital download, streaming	55	12,000	
Aoi Kajitsu/Kinjirareta Asobi (青い果実／禁じられた遊び)	Released: December 21, 1982; Label: CBS Cony; Formats: CD, LP, cassette, digital download, streaming	26	41,000	
Momoe no Kisetsu (百恵の季節)	Released: April 21, 1984; Label: CBS Cony; Formats: CD, LP, cassette, digital download, streaming	7	53,000	
Hitonatsu no Keiken (ひと夏の経験)	Released: August 1, 1984; Label: CBS Cony; Formats: CD, LP, cassette, digital download, streaming	3	78,000	
15sai (15才)	Released: December 10, 1984; Label: CBS Cony; Formats: CD, LP, cassette, digital download, streaming	8	56,000	
16-sai no Theme (16才のテーマ)	Released: May 1, 1975; Label: CBS Cony; Formats: CD, LP, cassette, digital download, streaming	3	67,000	
Sasayakana Yokubō (ささやかな欲望)	Released: December 5, 1975; Label: CBS Cony; Formats: CD, LP, cassette, digital download, streaming	15	47,000	
17-sai no Theme (17才のテーマ)	Released: April 21, 1976; Label: CBS Cony; Formats: CD, LP, cassette, digital download, streaming	2	77,000	
Yokosuka Story (横須賀ストーリー)	Released: August 1, 1976; Label: CBS Cony; Formats: CD, LP, cassette, digital download, streaming	3	73,000	
Pearl Color ni Yurete (パールカラーにゆれて)	Released: December 5, 1976; Label: CBS Cony; Formats: CD, LP, cassette, digital download, streaming	6	54,000	
Momoe Hakusho (百恵白書)	Released: May 21, 1977; Label: CBS Cony; Formats: CD, LP, cassette, digital download, streaming	3	64,000	
Golden Flight	Released: August 21, 1977; Label: CBS Cony; Formats: CD, LP, cassette, digital download, streaming	3	56,000	
Hana Zakari (花ざかり)	Released: December 5, 1977; Label: CBS Cony; Formats: CD, LP, cassette, digital download, streaming	7	56,000	
Cosmos (Uchū) (宇宙)	Released: May 1, 1978; Label: CBS Cony; Formats: CD, LP, cassette, digital download, streaming	8	43,000	
Dramatic	Released: September 1, 1978; Label: CBS Cony; Formats: CD, LP, cassette, digital download, streaming	6	103,000	
Manjushaka (曼珠沙華)	Released: December 21, 1978; Label: CBS Cony; Formats: CD, LP, cassette, digital download, streaming	7	134,000	
A Face in a Vision	Released: April 1, 1979; Label: CBS Cony; Formats: CD, LP, cassette, digital download, streaming	4	80,000	
L.A. Blue	Released: July 21, 1979; Label: CBS Cony; Formats: CD, LP, cassette, digital download, streaming	2	87,0000	
Harutsugedori (春告鳥)	Released: February 1, 1980; Label: CBS Cony; Formats: CD, LP, cassette, digital download, streaming	5	94,000	
Möbius's Game	Released: May 21, 1980; Label: CBS Cony; Formats: CD, LP, cassette, digital download, streaming	5	80,000	
Phoenix Densetsu (不死鳥フェニックス伝説)	Released: August 21, 1980; Label: CBS Cony; Formats: CD, LP, cassette, digital download, streaming	6	92,000	
This is My Trial	Released: October 21, 1980; Label: CBS Cony; Formats: CD, LP, cassette, digital download, streaming	4	86,000	

== Compilation albums ==
List of compilation albums, with selected chart positions
Number	Title	Release Date	Peak positions	Serial number
Number	Title	Release Date	JPN Oricon	Serial number
1	Yamaguchi Momoe Hit Zenkyokushuu: 1974ban (山口百恵ヒット全曲集 -1974年版-)	1 November 1974	6	SOLL-107
2	DELUXE SERIES Yamaguchi Momoe Deluxe (DELUXE SERIES 山口百恵デラックス)	1 June 1975	21	SOLI-56/7
3	Best Hits Yamaguchi Momoe Hit Zenkyokushuu (Best Hits 山口百恵ヒット全曲集)	1 November 1975	10	SOLL-170
4	Best of Best Yamaguchi Momoe no Subete (Best of Best 山口百恵のすべて)	1 June 1976	26	38AH-9/10
5	Best Hits Yamaguchi Momoe Hit Zenkyokushuu (Best Hits 山口百恵ヒット全曲集)	1 November 1976	7	25AH-81
6	Yamaguchi Momoe (山口百恵)	21 June 1977	15	38AH-217/8
7	THE BEST Yamaguchi Momoe: Momoe Monogatari (THE BEST 山口百恵 -百恵物語-)	1 November 1977	12	25AH-301
8	THE BEST Playback (THE BEST プレイバック)	21 June 1978	3	25AH-521
9	THE BEST Yamaguchi Momoe (THE BEST 山口百恵)	1 November 1978	9	38AH-591/2
10	The Best Yamaguchi Momoe (ザ・ベスト 山口百恵)	21 June 1979	8	25AH-744
11	THE BEST Yamaguchi Momoe (THE BEST 山口百恵)	1 November 1979	22	40AH-831/2
12	Star Legend Momoe Densetsu (Star Legend 百恵伝説)	21 July 1980	3	00AH-1021/5
13	Utai Tsugareteyuku Uta no Youni '73〜'77 (歌い継がれてゆく歌のように '73〜'77)	21 December 1980	60	40AH-1167/8
13	Utai Tsugareteyuku Uta no Youni '78〜'80 (歌い継がれてゆく歌のように '78〜'80)	21 December 1980	44	40AH-1169/70
14	THE BEST Again Momoe (THE BEST Again 百恵)	1 November 1981	-	28AH-1342
15	Again Momoe Anata e no Komoriuta (Again 百恵 あなたへの子守唄)	1 July 1982	13	28AH-1435; 30AH-1222
16	PLAYBACK MOMOE 1973-1982	21 November 1982	-	60AH-1486/8
17	33 SINGLES MOMOE	21 November 1983	-	60DH-51
18	3650 Momoe Juunen (百惠十年)	21 December 1983	-	60AH-1683/5
19	Yamaguchi Momoe Best Collection (山口百恵ベスト・コレクション)	21 April 1985	-	
20	Momoe Fukkatsu (百恵復活)	21 February 1992	12	SRCL-2311/2
21	Momoe Kaiki (百恵回帰)	21 November 1992	49	SRCL-2512
22	Utai Tsugareteyuku Uta no Youni: Momoe Kaiki 2 (歌い継がれてゆく歌のように -百恵回帰II-)	21 January 1993	82	SRCL-2558
23	Momoe Actress Densetsu (百恵・アクトレス伝説)	1 October 1993	-	SRCL-2742
24	Sekkishun Fu (惜春 譜)	21 July 1994	60	SRCL-2955
25	Momoe Climax (百恵クライマックス)	1 December 1994	-	SRCL-3110/1
26	Yamaguchi Momoe Best Collection: Yokosuka Story (山口百惠ベスト・コレクション〜横須賀ストーリー〜)	1 February 1995	-	
27	Momoe Jiten (百惠辞典)	1 August 1995	73	SRCL-3281/3
28	Yamaguchi Momoe Best Collection: Ii Hi Tabidachi (山口百惠ベスト・コレクションII 〜いい日旅立ち〜)	1 September 1995	-	
29	Best Selection Vol.1 (ベスト・セレクション Vol.1)	21 July 1997	-	SRCL-3989
30	Best Selection Vol.2(ベスト・セレクション Vol.2)	21 July 1997	-	SRCL-3990
31	GOLDEN J-POP/THE BEST Yamaguchi Momoe (GOLDEN J-POP／THE BEST 山口百惠)	21 November 1997	243	SRCL-4117/8
32	2000 BEST Yamaguchi Momoe Best Collection (2000 BEST 山口百恵 ベスト・コレクション)	21 June 2000	202	SRCL-4827
33	GOLDEN☆BEST Yamaguchi Momoe PLAYBACK MOMOE part2 (GOLDEN☆BEST 山口百恵 PLAYBACK MOMOE part2)	19 June 2002	114	MHCL-109/10
34	Complete Momoe Kaiki (コンプリート百恵回帰)	25 May 2005	161	MHCL-10078/9
35	Akai Series Single Collection (赤いシリーズ シングル・コレクション)	19 October 2005	237	MHCL-638
36	Yamaguchi Momoe Best Collection Vol.1 (山口百恵ベスト・コレクション VOL.1)	20 July 2007	-	
37	Yamaguchi Momoe Best Collection Vol.2 (山口百恵ベスト・コレクション VOL.2)	20 July 2007	-	
38	MOMOE PREMIUM update	30 September 2007	-	DQCL-1385/6
39	GOLDEN☆BEST Yamaguchi Momoe Complete Single Collection (GOLDEN☆BEST 山口百恵 コンプリート・シングルコレクション)	19 August 2009	60	MHCL-20053/4; MHCL-1569/70
39	GOLDEN☆BEST orikara Momoe Complete Single Collection]]	26 January 2011	-	MHCL-1845/6
40	GOLDEN☆BEST Yamaguchi Momoe Album Selection (GOLDEN☆BEST 山口百恵 アルバム・セレクション)	22 May 2013	116	MHCL-2270/1
41	Golden Idol Yamaguchi Momoe (ゴールデン☆アイドル 山口百恵)	11 February 2015	38	MHCL-30295/8
42	GOLDEN☆BEST Yamaguchi Momoe Nihon no Yonshiki wo Utau (GOLDEN☆BEST 山口百恵 日本の四季を歌う)	24 May 2017	129	MHCL-30456/7
43	GOLDEN☆BEST MOMOE DISCO ＆ SOUL	8 November 2023	-	MHCL-30920
"—" denotes items which did not chart.

== Box sets ==
List of compilation albums, with selected chart positions
Number	Title	Release Date	Peak positions	Serial number
Number	Title	Release Date	JPN Oricon	Serial number
1	REBIRTH／Momoe Zenshuu (REBIRTH／百恵全集)	21 May 1984	-	00DH-84/7
2	Yamaguchi Momoe Zenkyokushuu (山口百惠全曲集)	25 November 1993	-	
3	Momoe Shinwa One and Oney 1973-1980 (百惠神話 ONE AND ONLY 1973–1980)	21 August 1996	-	SRCL-3631
4	Momoe Densetsu 2: Star Legend 2 (百恵伝説II -STAR LEGEND II-)	27 February 1999	95	SRCL-4431/5
5	Yamaguchi Momoe Joyuu Densetsu (山口百惠 女優伝説)	18 October 2000	-	SRCL-4891/9
6	MOMOE PREMIUM	4 June 2003	8	MHCL-251/74
6	Complete MOMOE PREMIUM	30 September 2007	-	DQCL-1361/84
7	Yamaguchi Momoe 22 Original Albums Collection (山口百恵 22 Original Albums Collection)	1 November 2005	-	DYCS-1072
8	MOMOE LIVE PREMIUM	18 January 2006年	36	MHCL-731/51
9	Complete Momoe Densetsu (コンプリート百恵伝説)	11 December 2008	-	DQCL-1471
"—" denotes items which did not chart.

== Live albums ==
List of live albums, with selected chart positions
Title	Album details	Peak positions
Title	Album details	JPN Oricon
Momoe Live: Momoe-chan Matsuri Yori (百恵ライブ -百恵ちゃん祭りより-)	Released: October 1, 1975; Label: CBS Cony; Formats: CD, LP, cassette, digital download, streaming	10
Momoe on Stage	Released: October 21, 1976; Label: CBS Cony; Formats: CD, LP, cassette, digital download, streaming	22
Momoe in Koma	Released: November 1, 1977; Label: CBS Cony; Formats: CD, LP, cassette, digital download, streaming	29
Momoe-chan Matsuri '78 (百恵ちゃんまつり'78)	Released: October 21, 1978; Label: CBS Cony; Formats: CD, LP, cassette, digital download, streaming	27
Recital: Ai ga Uta ni Kawaru Toki (リサイタル -愛が詩にかわる時-)	Released: November 21, 1979; Label: CBS Cony; Formats: CD, LP, cassette, digital download, streaming	42
Densetsu Kara Shinwa e: Budokan... At Last (伝説から神話へ)	Released: November 19, 1980; Label: CBS Cony; Formats: CD, LP, cassette, digital download, streaming	3
"—" denotes items which did not chart.

== Tribute albums ==
List of video albums, with selected chart positions
Title	Album details	Peak positions
Title	Album details	JPN Oricon
Yamaguchi Momoe Tribute Thank You For… (山口百恵トリビュート Thank You For...)	Released: May 19, 2004; Label: CBS Cony; Formats: CD, digital download, streaming	3
Yamaguchi Momoe Tribute Thank You For…2 (山口百恵トリビュート Thank You For...2)	Released: May 25, 2005; Label: CBS Cony; Formats: CD, digital download, streaming	6

== Video albums ==
List of video albums, with selected chart positions
Title	Album details	Peak positions
Title	Album details	JPN Oricon
Yamaguchi momoe gekisha/ shinoyama kishin (山口百恵 激写／篠山紀信)	Released: 1980; Label: CBS Cony; Formats: VHS, LD, DVD	-
Densetsu Kara Shinwa e: Budokan... At Last (伝説から神話へ)	Released: November 19, 1980; Label: CBS Cony; Formats: VHS, LD, DVD, BD	-
Yamaguchi Momoe Shuen Eiga Taizenshū (山口百恵主演映画大全集)	Released: March 22, 1994; Label: CBS Cony; Formats: VHS, DVD	-
The Best Ten Yamaguchi Momoe Kanzen Hozon-ban DVD Box (ザ・ベストテン 山口百恵 完全保存版 DVD BOX)	Released: December 16, 2009; Label: CBS Cony; Formats: DVDs	7
Yamaguchi Momoe in Yoru no Hit Studio (山口百恵 in 夜のヒットスタジオ)	Released: June 30, 2010; Label: CBS Cony; Formats: DVDs	3
"—" denotes items which did not chart.

== Singles ==
List of singles, with Japan(Oricon) chart positions
Title	Year	Peak Pos	Weeks on Chart	Wks No 1	Wks TOP3	Wks TOP10	Sales
"Toshigoro" ("Adolescence", としごろ)	1973	37	15				67,400
"Aoi Kajitsu" ("Unripe fruit", 青い果実)	1973	9	21			3	196,200
"Kinjirareta Asobi" ("Forbidden play", 禁じられた遊び)	1973	12	16				175,900
"Haru Kaze no Itazura" ("Spring wind's tease", 春風のいたずら)	1974	11	15				160,600
"Hito Natsu no Keiken" ("An experience one summer", ひと夏の経験)	1974	3	19		2	12	446,300
"Chippoke na Kanshō" ("Tiny sentiment", ちっぽけな感傷)	1974	3	20		5	10	431,550
"Fuyu no Iro" ("Winter colors", 冬の色)	1974	1	17	6	8	10	529,350
"Mizuumi no Kesshin" ("Resolution at a lake", 湖の決心)	1975	5	14			8	249,400
"Natsu Hiraku Seishun" ("Youth starts in summer", 夏ひらく青春)	1975	4	17			9	328,700
"Sasayaka na Yokubō" ("Modest desire", ささやかな欲望)	1975	5	24			7	326,000
"Shiroi Yakusoku" ("White promise", 白い約束)	1975	2	18		3	8	350,100
"Ai ni Hashitte" ("Running to love", 愛に走って)	1976	2	19		5	10	465,450
"Yokosuka Story" (横須賀ストーリー)	1976	1	23	7	11	12	660,800
"Pearl Color ni Yurete" ("Swaying in pearl color", パールカラーにゆれて)	1976	1	19	5	7	9	470,460
"Akai Shōgeki" ("Red shock", 赤い衝撃)	1976	3	25		3	9	503,890
"Hatsukoi Sōshi" ("First love storybook"", 初恋草紙)	1977	4	13			6	241,030
"Yumesaki Annainin" ("Dream guide", 夢先案内人)	1977	1	17	1	8	11	467,770
"Imitation Gold" (イミテイション・ゴールド)	1977	2	18		8	10	484,340
"Cosmos" (秋桜)	1977	3	19		5	10	460,420
"Akai Kizuna (Red Sensation)" (赤い絆 (レッド・センセーション))	1977	5	14			5	215,150
"Otomeza Kyū" ("The Virgo constellation", 乙女座宮)	1978	4	16			7	313,680
"Playback Part 2" (プレイバックPart2)	1978	2	21		5	10	507,920
"Zettai Zetsumei" ("Stalemate", 絶体絶命)	1978	3	16		1	9	376,170
"Ii Hi Tabidachi" ("Leaving on a good day", いい日旅立ち)	1978	3	23		1	11	535,590
"Be Silent" ("Beautiful silent", 美・サイレント)	1979	4	15			7	329,010
"Ai no Arashi" ("Jealousy Storm", 愛の嵐)	1979	5	17			11	327,750
"Shinayaka ni Utatte" ("Sing along", しなやかに歌って)	1979	8	19			7	271,110
"Aizenbashi" ("The bridge of love", 愛染橋)	1979	10	13			2	220,950
"Shanikusai" ("The carnival", 謝肉祭)	1980	4	15			6	285,870
"Rock 'n' Roll Widow" (ロックンロール・ウィドウ)	1980	3	17		1	7	336,170
"Sayonara no Mukōgawa" ("The other side of goodbye", さよならの向う側)	1980	4	21			8	378,680
"Ichie" (一恵)	1980	2	14		1	5	276,550
"Sekishun Dōri" ("Street of late spring", 惜春通り)	1994	34	4				31,000

== Song-writing credits ==
List of non-studio album, song-writing credits that feature Momoe Yamaguchi
Title	Year	Artist	Album/Single
"Let me be lonely"	1980	Tomokazu Miura	Ki・Do・I
"A n Ta"	1980	Tomokazu Miura	Ki・Do・I
"LA SAISON"	1982	Ann Lewis	LA SAISON D'AMOUR
"I LOVE YOU yori Aishiteru"	1983	Ann Lewis	I LOVE YOU yori Aishiteru
"Toorisugita Kaze"	1983	Mizue Takada	Toorisugita Kaze
"Cinderella Liberty"	1987	Kiyomi Suzuki with Rats&Star	Woman

== See also ==
- Momoe Yamaguchi
- List of best-selling music artists in Japan
