= The Dancing Girl of Izu =

- Short story by Yasunari Kawabata
- Original title: Izu no Odoriko
- Translator: E. Seidensticker (1955); J. Martin Holman (1997)
- Country: Japan
- Language: Japanese

Publication
- Published in: Bungei Jidai
- Publication type: Magazine
- Media type: Print
- Publication date: 1926
- Published in English: 1955 (abridged)

The Dancing Girl of Izu or The Izu Dancer (Japanese: 伊豆の踊子, Hepburn: Izu no Odoriko) is a short story (or, accounting for its length, a novella) by Japanese writer and Nobel Prize winner Yasunari Kawabata first published in 1926.

== Plot ==
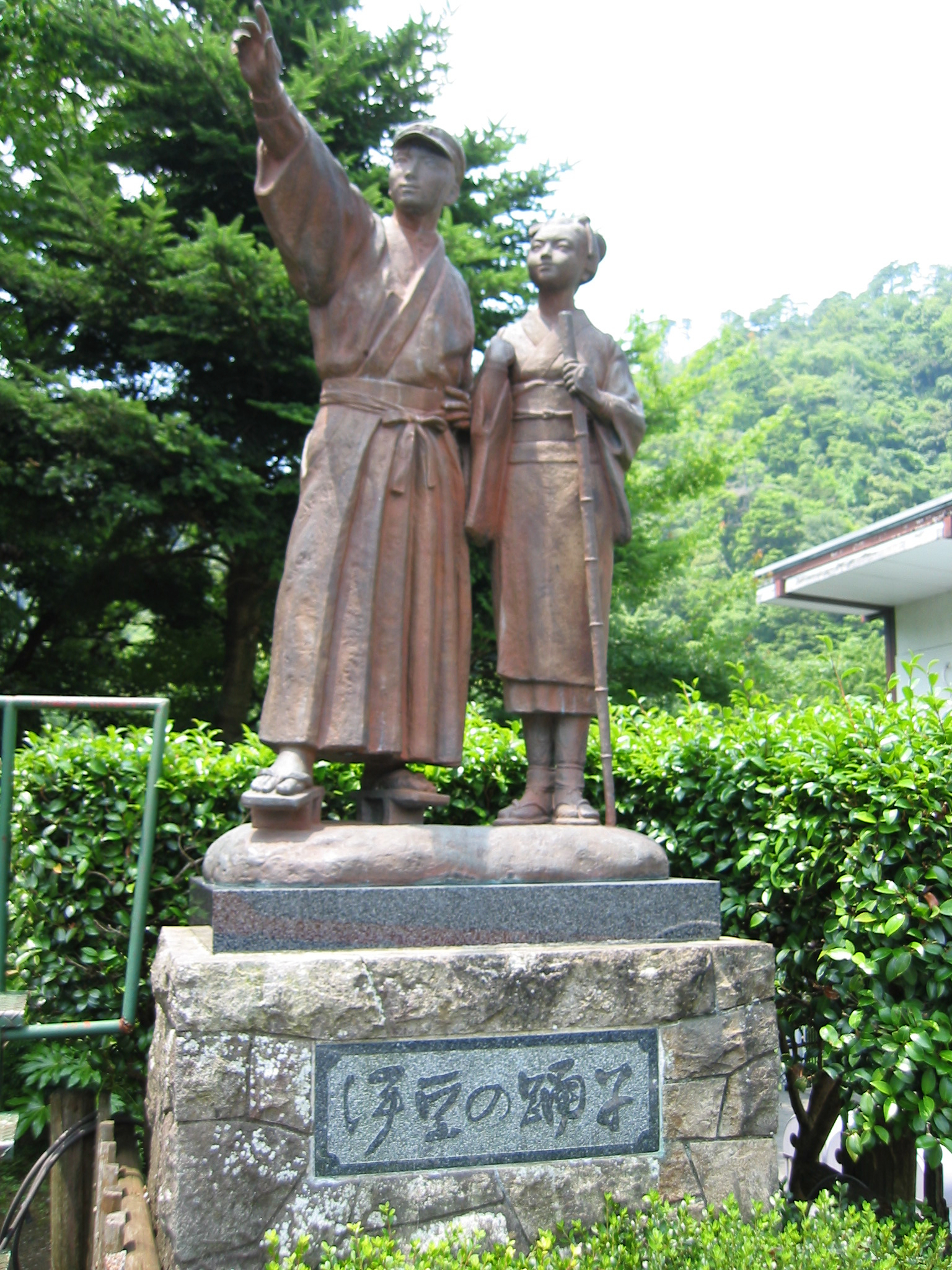
Bronze statue dedicated to "The Dancing Girl of Izu"

The narrator, a twenty-year-old student from Tokyo, travels the Izu Peninsula during the last days of the summer holidays, a journey which he undertook out of a feeling of loneliness and melancholia. His paths repeatedly cross with a troupe of five travelling musicians, one man and four women, while heading for Mount Amagi tunnel. He is impressed by the beauty of the youngest looking woman in the troupe, who carries a heavy drum, and decides to follow them.

After traversing the tunnel, Eikichi, the troupe's male leader, starts a conversation with him, telling him that he and his companions are from Ōshima Island and on a short tour before the cold season sets in. In Yugano, where the group rests for the night, the narrator learns from Eikichi that the young woman, Kaoru, is his 14 year old sister. The other troupe members are Eikichi's wife Chiyoko, his mother-in-law, and a maid. In the evening, the musicians entertain guests in another inn in the village. The student hears Kaoru playing her drum, worrying if she might be harassed by her listeners.

The next day, the narrator witnesses the naked Kaoru coming out of the bath house, waving at him. The sight makes him laugh, realising that she is still a young, innocent girl. Although the day of his return to Tokyo is approaching, he accepts the musicians' offer to keep them company for another day. During a walk, the student overhears Kaoru and Chiyoko saying what a nice person he is, which enlightens him and distracts him both from his melancholia and from the fact that the group are poor, uneducated people. Eikichi's mother-in-law invites him to their home during his winter holidays, but later forbids Kaoru to accompany him to the cinema.

The next morning, the student enters a boat in Shimoda which takes him back to Tokyo, seen off by Eikichi and the grieving Kaoru. On the boat, he starts to cry, saddened by the parting but at the same time sensing a feeling of relief.

== Publication history ==
Kawabata Yasunari made a trip to the peninsula Izu in the autumn of 1918 while being a student of the First Higher School in Tōkyō. In 1919, he published the short story Chiyo (ちよ) in a journal (校友会雑誌, kōyūkai zasshi) of his school with a dancer at its center. In 1922, he wrote a further version, 湯ヶ島での思ひ出 (yugashima de no omoide, Reminiscences in Yugashima), a manuscript of 107 pages, but published it partially only in 1948 in the collection 少年 (shōnen). The story The Dancing Girl of Izu was first published in Bungei Jidai magazine in two parts in 1926 and in book form by Kinseido in 1927 together with nine other stories.

== Reception and legacy ==
Reviewing the 1997 American publication, Mark Morris in The New York Times called The Dancing Girl of Izu a "deceptively simple story […] about cleansing, purification", pointing out for one the "effacement of adult female sexuality and its replacement by an impossible white void of virginity", a common theme with Kawabata, as well as the protagonist's "personal absolution", received from people constantly living with the "stigma of social exclusion".

In his review of a 2000 anthology, Donald Richie rated The Izu Dancer as Kawabata's most famous and popular work, an autobiographical and "seemingly artless […] evocation of first love itself".

The limited express Odoriko that runs from Tokyo to Izu Peninsula is named after this book.

== Translations ==
The Dancing Girl of Izu was first translated into English by Edward Seidensticker, being the first story by Kawabata which saw an English translation, and published in an abridged form as The Izu Dancer in The Atlantic Monthly in its 1955 edition. The translation is divided into six sections (I–VI), instead of the original seven (1–7). It is abridged at two parts that are speculated of being made for political reasons during the years of the cold war. Other, uncommented abbreviations are related to the scene at the end of the original section 3 concerning the games of Go and Five in a row, or to the scene in the latter half of the original section 4 concerning the reading from the travel notes of Mito Kōmon (水戸黄門漫遊記, Mito Kōmon man'yūki). Two new unabridged English translations, both in 1997, were provided by J. Martin Holman and again by Edward Seidensticker. In 1942, it was already published in German in a translation by Oscar Benl.

== Contribution of the story to the awarding of the Nobel Prize ==
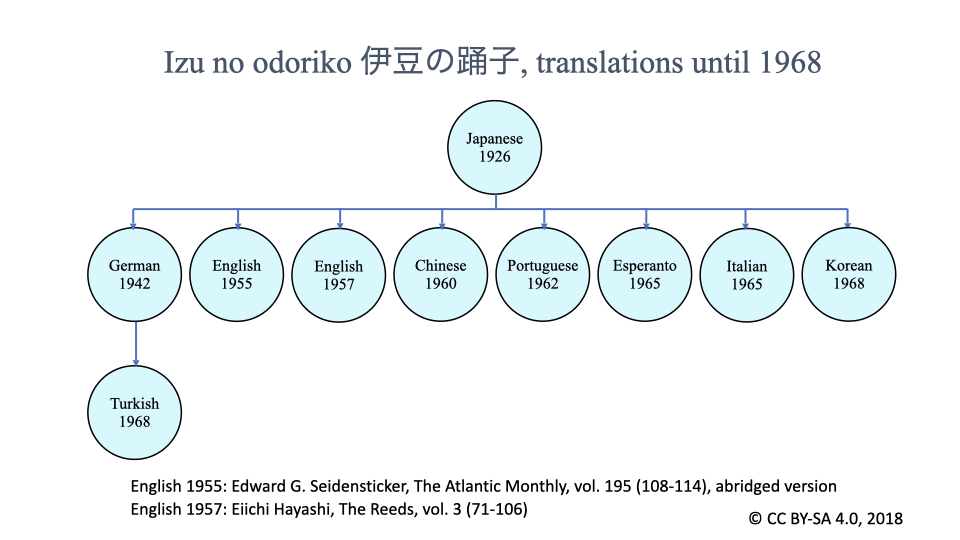
Translations of "Izu no Odoriko" until 1968

In 1968, Kawabata Yasunari received the Nobel Prize in Literature "for his narrative mastery, which with great sensibility expresses the essence of the Japanese mind". Although Anders Österling in his presentation speech on 10 December 1968 does not mention the story by name, he said:

In a youthful short story, which first drew attention to him at the age of twenty-seven, he tells of a student who, during lonely autumn walks on the peninsula of Izu, comes across a poor, despised dancing girl, with whom he has a touching love affair; she opens her pure heart and shows the young man a way to deep and genuine feeling.

By the end of 1968 the story had been translated into 9 different languages.

== Adaptations ==
=== Films ===
- The Dancing Girl of Izu (1933), starring Kinuyo Tanaka and Den Obinata, directed by Heinosuke Gosho
- Izu no Odoriko (1954), starring Hibari Misora and Akira Ishihama, directed by Yoshitarō Nomura
- Izu no Odoriko (1960), starring Haruko Wanibuchi and Masahiko Tsugawa, directed by Yoshirō Kawazu
- Izu no Odoriko (1963), starring Sayuri Yoshinaga and Hideki Takahashi, directed by Katsumi Nishikawa
- Izu no Odoriko (1967), starring Yōko Naitō and Toshio Kurosawa, directed by Hideo Onchi
- Izu no Odoriko (1974), starring Momoe Yamaguchi and Tomokazu Miura, directed by Katsumi Nishikawa

=== Television ===
Kawabata's story has also been dramatised for Japanese television numerous times, including a 1993 version starring Takuya Kimura.

== Popular culture ==
The story is well known in Japan, and today, Odoriko (lit. "dancing girl") is used as the name of express trains to the Izu area.
