= List of Mitsudomoe characters =

Some of the characters from the anime adaptation of Mitsudomoe. From left to right: Miyashita, Hitoha, Miku, Mitsuba, Yuki, Futaba, and Shinya.

The following is a list of characters from the anime, and manga series Mitsudomoe. The series follows three triplets named Mitsuba, Futaba, and Hitoha and their misadventures. Schoolteacher Satoshi Yabe has just been given his first classroom to handle (Class 6-3) as he prepares to start off his new job. He is given a class with three troublesome children known as the "Marui Triplets" who cause him trouble. In the class itself there exist rivals and formed friendships, some of which are better built than others. From an outside perspective class 6-3 appears perverted due to misunderstandings that are running gags throughout the series. These misunderstandings also exist between the students, and between their teacher Satoshi. Outside of the school the triplet's separate interests are also revealed.

Several different sources have reviewed the characters as they appear in the anime adaptation. The drawings were called poorly drawn, with one reviewer describing how all the characters including the adults are drawn looking like children. The Marui triplets are also unanimously referred to as crazy hyperactive characters. While the artwork was criticized, the animation and production effort done by the Japanese studio Bridge were praised.

== The Marui Family ==
Mitsuba Marui (丸井 みつば, Marui Mitsuba)
Voiced by: Ayahi Takagaki
Mitsuba is the eldest of the Marui triplets who typically wears a skirt, striped thigh-high socks, a t-shirt and a jacket. She enjoys causing mischief and tries to get her classmates to address her as Mitsuba-sama and serve her. Mitsuba is also aptly described as a "precocious sadist". Mitsuba is easily embarrassed however, and quick to deny her feelings toward someone when she really does care about them. A running gag in the anime has her getting hurt unintentionally by her younger sister Futaba. Mitsuba is pretty conscious when it comes to her weight knowing that she is chubby, though this doesn’t stop her from stuffing her face with food. Another running gag has her trying to change the name of the series to Mitsubasama during the opening titles, before her sister Hitoha stops her. Translated into English, Mitsuba's name means three-leaf.

Futaba Marui (丸井 ふたば, Marui Futaba)
Voiced by: Satomi Akesaka
Futaba is the middle of the Marui triplets when it comes to age, and is the only sister whose outfit doesn't change daily. She is always barefoot, though nobody ever comments on it. Futaba always thinks of others before herself but her common sense is a bit twisted. Out of the Marui sisters, she seems to be the only one close to their father. Futaba is very athletic, and she practices martial arts which most of the time leads her into trouble. A few examples of this is her accidentally breaking Mitsuba's school desk repeatedly among other things. She is also very artistic which she uses towards a boob obsession she has. It is explained by her younger sister Hitoha that while Futaba is goofy, she does have dedication when the topic is about breasts. Futaba gets along with the boys in her class mostly due to their shared interests, she is closest to Shinya whom she affectionately calls Shin-chan. Futaba appears to have a developing crush on him, but Shinya looks away blushing whenever they get too close. Translated into English her name means two-leaf.

Hitoha Marui (丸井 ひとは, Marui Hitoha)
Voiced by: Haruka Tomatsu
Hitoha is the youngest of the three triplets, she is shown to give death glares at people while appearing cold. On the inside though she is nervous a-lot in situations throughout the series. Hitoha also has a fear of heights which is first shown in the episode "Hats and Underwear Go on your Head". Her hobbies include watching "Gachi Rangers" which is a parody of "Super Sentai" or "Power Ranger", and reading a perverted book that has pictures of nude females in it. Hitoha is fond of a hamster named Chikubi(Nipples) that has become the class pet. Out of her two other sisters Hitoha is kinder to Futaba, and pulls pranks on Mitsuba for her behavior towards others. Hitoha, and her teacher Satoshi share things in common but due to his misunderstandings thinks he is also perverted. Translated into English her name means one-leaf.

Soujirou Marui (丸井 草次郎, Marui Sōjirō)
Voiced by: Masuo Amada
Soujirou is the triplets' rotund father. At first glance he looks very suspicious and is often mistaken as a pedophile or a thief which results in a running gag of him being arrested. Soujirou is shown to be a caring father, but is also seen as over-protective. His oldest daughter Mitsuba in particular is very embarrassed by him, while Futaba is very fond of him and his youngest is put off by him. However it has been shown that all of his daughters do in fact love him deep down. It is unclear what happened to Soujirou's wife but it is assumed that she is deceased.

== Class 6-3 ==
Satoshi Yabe (矢部 智, Yabe Satoshi)
Voiced by: Hiro Shimono
Yabe is a new teacher hoping to start a fresh career at an elementary school. Unfortunately for him he is placed in a classroom with the three most problematic children in Japan known as the Marui triplets. Being a teacher he has to endure all of the misadventures the girls and his classroom have. Yabe tries his best to keep things under control but because of his good nature he is targeted which he refers to as "bullying" by the three girls. He is given the nickname "Yabecchi" by his classmates and all the students call him by that, except for Hitoha. Of the three triplets he is shown to be closest to her in terms of support, and like her he also is a fan of Gachi Rangers. Due to misunderstandings though in conversations with Hitoha they both find each other strange. At one point he buys a hamster for his classroom which is named Nipples by Futaba. He also has a crush on the school nurse but due to her being an airhead it is one sided.

Shinya Satou (佐藤 信也, Satō Shin'ya)
Voiced by: Yuko Sanpei
Shinya is Futaba's childhood friend, and is best friends with another classmate named Chiba. Like Yabe-Sensei, he is often put into misunderstood situations that unfortunately result in his classmates thinking that he is a pervert. Shinya is an honor student in the class, and is seen as the most observant and mature person who tries to do the right thing most of the time. He is also the target of many girls who have a crush on him which due to his age results in him freaked out by them. Futaba in particular makes him embarrassed often even though it is unintentional. Despite the embarrassment Futaba is the only girl out of Marui sisters that he is close to. Even though he is put into awkward situations by her, he understands that it was out of good will. Due to his popularity with girls he is often pranked by Chiba who is jealous of him.

Yuudai Chiba (千葉 雄大, Chiba Yūdai)
Voiced by: Kazutomi Yamamoto
Chiba is Shinya's classmate and best friend, but is shown to be the opposite of him in some aspects. Unlike his best friend he is slack when doing homework and has a more perverted nature. Due to Shinya being popular with the girls he is jealous of him which leads to pranks being pulled as a result. He brings and reads manga in school, and desperately wants to read Hitoha's erotic book; he even goes as far as begging on his knees but Hitoha ends up saying "No". Chiba is shown always wearing a hat that has the number "69" on it perhaps referencing the sexual position.

Miku Sugisaki (杉崎 みく, Sugisaki Miku)
Voiced by: Chiwa Saitou
Miku is a boisterous and preppy girl who loathes Mitsuba. The two are bitter rivals, and are always competing with each other on various things from knowledge to bust size. The rivalry is so intense that she is known to take secretly hundreds of photos of Mitsuba with her cell phone in order to find weaknesses. Miku is friends with classmates Yuki and Miyashita, with whom she has formed a clique. Despite her rivalry with Mitsuba she treats her friends with respect, even going as far as giving her some chocolate on Valentine's Day. Miku has one younger brother named Ryuuta (Voiced by: Yuko Takayama) who is shown to be bratty, and selfish but looks up to her. He is also a fan of the Gachi Rangers and may have developed a crush on Hitoha. Miku's mom Marina (Voiced by: Kikuko Inoue) is also present in the series, and is shown to be a masochist which as a result embarrasses her.

Yuki Yoshioka (吉岡 ゆき, Yoshioka Yuki)
Voiced by: Aki Toyosaki
Yuki is a classmate/friend of Miku who is shown to be a shy calm girl with short brown hair and thick eyebrows. She loves romance stories, and is looking hard for someone to fall in love with her. She usually gets carried away though very easily about romance, and tends to see a romantic plot in about anything going on. It is shown that her parents are very lovey-dovey which may be where her interest in love stems from.

Miyashita (宮下, Miyashita)
Voiced by: Momoko Oohara
Miyashita is shown to be a tall girl with a laid back but sporty personality. Her introduction describes her as the only student in Class 6-3 who is well adjusted but yet has learned that "no good deed goes unpunished". Much to her chagrin her classmates keep forgetting the end of her name, getting "Miya--" right without being able to remember the rest. She apparently looks different with her hair down, but the class still somehow recognizes her if she has her hairpins on. Miyashita tries to form a friendship with Hitoha but it usually fails.

Sakiko Matsuoka (松岡 咲子, Matsuoka Sakiko)
Voiced by: Ikumi Hayama
Sakiko is shown to be a friendly and polite girl, but she harbors an occult fetish and becomes overly excited whenever the possibility of ghosts or spirits arise. Her passion is shown when at one point she paints markings on her body in order to ward off evil spirits, a move that freaks the rest of the class out during swim class. She's mistaken Hitoha as a novice exorcist, and enjoys looking for ghosts or spirits with her much to Hitoha's chagrin. Despite her awkwardness though she appears to have formed a reluctant friendship with Hitoha even though they often end up misunderstanding each other.

Airi Ogata (緒方 愛梨, Ogata Airi)
Voiced by: Minori Chihara
Along with her friends Shiori, and Mayumi, Airi is deeply in love with Shinya. She is seen doing perverted things such as breathing in his air, or smelling his clothes. When Shinya supposedly likes something more than her be it person or thing, Airi in particular will become extremely jealous. Airi is the leader of "The Hopeless Squad" a term that was labeled by some of their classmates as a result of the trio's affection towards Shinya. The group's biggest rival is Futaba who is Shinya's childhood friend which leads to arguments. Like Futaba though Airi is shown to have some impressive athletic abilities, which she uses to try to impress Shinya. It is also revealed that Airi has one older brother who is a police officer.

Airi's friends include Shiori Itou (伊藤 詩織, Itō Shiori) who is Voiced by: Yuka Iguchi, and Mayumi Katou (加藤 真由美, Katō Mayumi) who is Voiced by: Aya Uchida. Shiori has brown pigtails, and is shown to be very sly and selfish. Despite her friendships she will often look for ways to get Shinya's love all for herself. Shiori is the only one with a pony tail, and despite their friendship appears to be the only one that notices Shiori's true intentions.

== Supporting characters ==
Marina Sugisaki (杉崎 麻里奈, Sugisaki Marina)
Voiced by: Kikuko Inoue
Marina is Miku and Ryuuta’s mother. In the last episode of Zōryōchu, she is claimed to be 17 years old.

Ryuuta Sugisaki (杉崎 龍太, Sugisaki Ryūta)
Voiced by: Yuko Takayama

Saeko Yoshioka (吉岡 紗江子, Yoshioka Saeko)
Voiced by: Omi Minami

Junji Yoshioka (吉岡 純次, Yoshioka Junji)
Voiced by: Tomoyuki Shimura

Akari Sato (佐藤 あかり, Satō Akari)
Voiced by: Yuko Sanpei

Masanobu Sato (佐藤 まさのぶ, Satō Masanobu)
Masanobu is Shinya’s father.

Eri Sato (佐藤 絵理, Satō Eri)
Eri is Shinya’s older sister.

Kazumi Chiba (千葉 和実, Chiba Kazumi)
Voiced by: Kazutomi Yamamoto

Ichirouta Ogata (緒方 一郎太, Ogata Ichirōta)
Voiced by: Yuki Kaji

== Other characters ==
Aiko Kuriyama (栗山 愛子, Kuriyama Aiko)
Voiced by: Momoko Saitou
Aiko is the school nurse who is very clumsy and can't see anything without her glasses on. She is liked by Yabe whom has a crush on her but due to misunderstandings, and her being airheaded she appears not to recognize his feelings. The misunderstandings also sometimes lead her to believe that Class 6-3 is perverted, an example being when she overheard the students talking about their class pet, nipples. She is given the nickname "Kuriyamacchi " by the triplets.

Kaieda (海江田)
Voiced by: Haruhi Terada
The 29-year-old teacher of class 6-1, she despises the wild kids of class 6-3. She appears to have a complex concerning her age, which is picked up on by the triplets. Kaieda is more developed in the second season of Mitsudomoe than she is in the first, where she is only shown in the opening sequence with everyone welcoming Yabe.

Noda (野田, Noda)
Voiced by: Binbin Takaoka
Noda is the school's principal, and has on more than one occasion had misunderstandings with Yabe. Due to these mishaps he has considered firing him but is apologetic offering support when he learns the truth. He appears to have sympathy for Yabe when he learns that he is a virgin who has no luck with women.

Nipples (チクビ, Chikubi)
Voiced by: Momoko Saitou
A brown, and white hamster who is given to the class by Yabe as a classroom pet. Shortly after arriving though she is given the name "Nipples" by Futaba to Yabe's dismay. Because of her name, discussions involving nipples are usually misinterpreted by everyone, including Kuriyama and the school's Principal. Hitoha quickly forms a bond with her, but gets jealous whenever Nipples gives attention to others more than her. Nipples also likes when her tail is petted, and has been taught to do back flips by Futaba when she clicks her fingers. Nipples appears to be Bisexual as it is shown in an episode that she was attracted to a female hamster print on Mitsuba's panties.

== Reception ==
While reviewing the first episode for summer previews in 2010, four reviewers from Anime News Network had a bit to say about the characters. When describing the Marui triplets, Hope Chapman referred to them as "terrifying" but only singles out Mitsuba and Hitoha. Theron Martin states that the set of "hellions" would make any teacher "wither". He goes on to say though that they are "nicely-animated", and praises the effort the animation company Bridge put into the series. Again citing the twins, Carl Kimlinger calls them different in their own way but equally as "hellish". Carl also states that the grade-school girls are poorly drawn. Gia Manry compares the triplets to the three main characters of Kodomo no Jikan, the difference being the Marui triplets being completely psychotic. She calls the characters "stilted," where everyone in the show including the adults look like 8-year-olds. Gia does, however, praise Hitoha's character for developing somewhat. Karen Mead from Japanator also gave the characters some feedback based on the first episode. She calls the character designs "ugly" in particular how Futaba's feet were drawn but says that the "production values are solid".
