= Katsumi Nishikawa =

Japanese film director

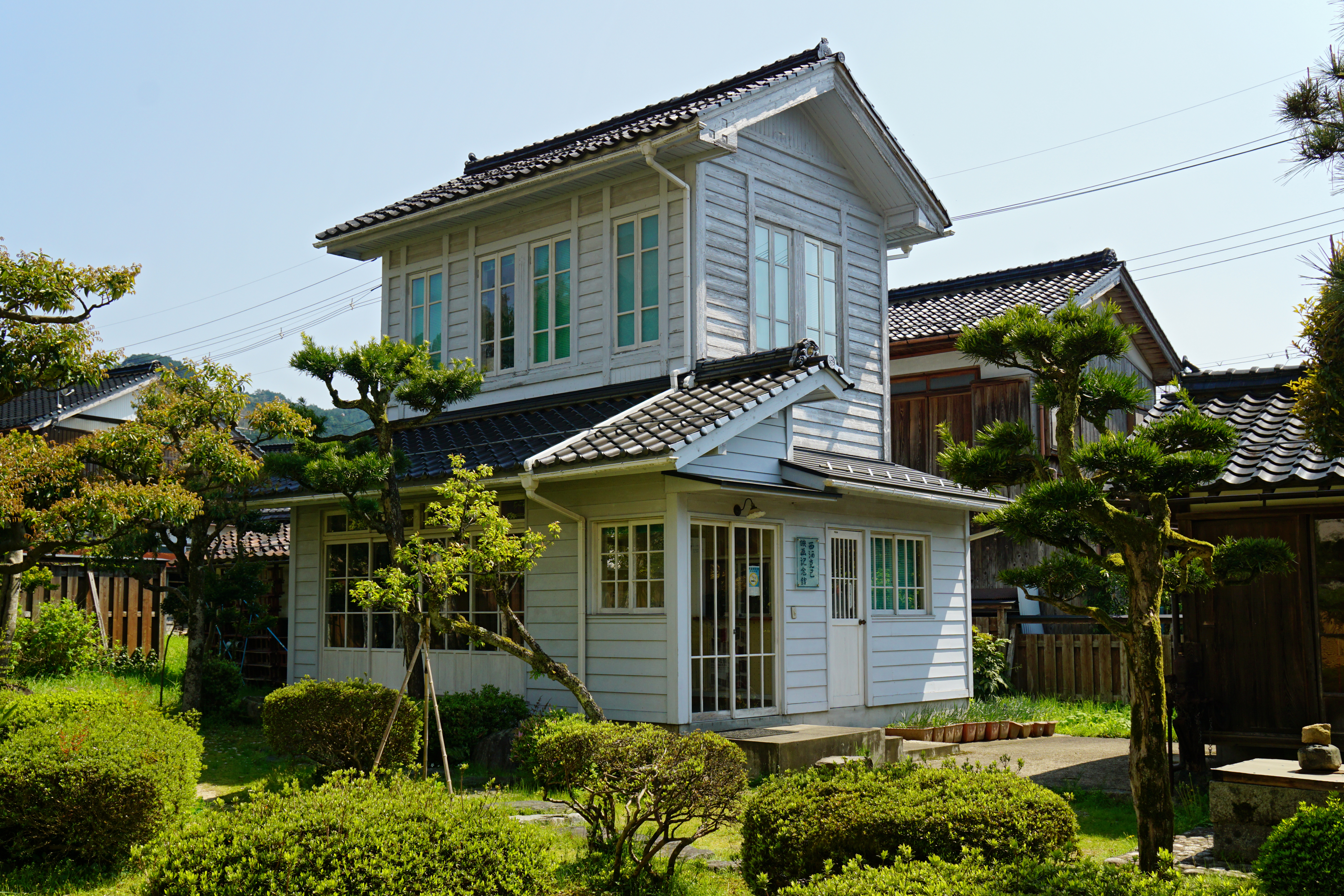
Katsumi Nishikawa Film Museum, Chizu, Japan

Katsumi Nishikawa (西河克己, Nishikawa Katsumi) (1 July 1918 – 6 April 2010) was a Japanese film director most famous for his youth films (seishun eiga). Graduating from Nihon University, he started out at the Shochiku studio in 1939 and directed his first film in 1952. He moved to Nikkatsu in 1954 and, while working in a variety of genres, became most famous for his youth films starring Sayuri Yoshinaga, Yujiro Ishihara, and Hideki Takahashi. In the 1970s, he remade some of these films with the idol singer Momoe Yamaguchi and her future husband Tomokazu Miura. The Katsumi Nishikawa Memorial Film Museum was opened in his hometown of Chizu, Tottori, in 2001. Nishikawa published several books, including one about his war experience and another about filming Yasunari Kawabata's The Dancing Girl of Izu several times. He died of pneumonia on April 6, 2010.

== Selected filmography ==
- Fudōtoku kyōiku kōza AKA Immoral Lecture (1959)
- Izu no Odoriko (1963)
- Izu no Odoriko (1974)
- Shunkinshō (1976)
