= Takahiro Miura =

Japanese actor (born 1985)

- 三浦 貴大
- Born: 10 November 1985 (age 40); Tokyo, Japan
- Education: Juntendo University
- Occupation: Actor
- Years active: 2010–present
- Agent: Anoré
- Parents: Tomokazu Miura (father); Momoe Yamaguchi (mother)
- Relatives: Yutaro Miura (older brother); Yui Makino (sister-in-law); Kenya Itogi (cousin)
- Website: Official profile

Takahiro Miura (三浦 貴大, Miura Takahiro; born 10 November 1985, in Tokyo) is a Japanese actor. He is represented with Anoré.

== Biography ==
Miura was born on November 10, 1985 in Tokyo. His father is Tomokazu Miura who is also an actor, his mother is an actress and a former singer Momoe Yamaguchi, and his brother is a singer-songwriter and an actor Yutaro Miura. Through his brother, his sister-in-law is voice actress Yui Makino.

He graduated from Juntendo University Sports Health Science Department.

== Filmography ==
=== Film ===
Year	Title	Role	Notes	Ref.
2010	Railways	Daigo Miyata		
2011	Gakkō o Tsukuro	Ei Senma	Lead role	
2013	Kids Return: The Reunion	Masaru	Lead role	
2013	The Eternal Zero	Takanori Takeda		
2014	Little Forest: Summer & Autumn	Yūta		
2015	A Sower of Seeds 2	Neguti Toshima		
2015	Little Forest: Winter & Spring	Yūta		
2015	Rolling	Shinichi	Lead role	
2015	Attack on Titan	Jean Kirstein		
2015	Attack on Titan: End of the World	Jean Kirstein		
2016	Kyoto Elegy	Watabe	Lead role	
2016	Shin Godzilla	Journalist		
2016	Rage	Sosuke Kitami		
2016	Cutie Honey: Tears	Aoko Hayami		
2016	Star Sand	Hajime Iwabuchi	Australian film	
2017	Her Sketchbook	Ryōtarō Yabe		
2018	Real Girl	Shingo Mabuchi		
2018	Flea-picking Samurai	Matsudaira Sadanobu		
2019	Dance with Me	Ryōsuke Murakami		
2020	Love and the Grand Tug-of-war	Takeshi Arima	Lead role	
2021	The Great Yokai War: Guardians	Tengu		
2022	To the Supreme!	Shintaro Iijima		
2022	Wandering	Yumura		
2022	Kingdom 2: Far and Away	Wei Dao		
2022	No Place to Go	Satoshi		
2022	Japanese Style			
2023	Winny	Toshimitsu Dan	Lead role	
2023	Kingdom 3: The Flame of Destiny	Wei Dao		
2023	Masked Hearts	Arakawa		
2024	Kingdom 4: Return of the Great General	Wei Dao		
2024	Sisam	Einosuke		
2024	Manga Artist, Mamoru Hori	Haguruma		
2025	Shinpei	Ujō Noguchi		
2025	Snowflowers: Seeds of Hope	Nakarai Motooki		
2025	Kokuho	Takeno		
2025	Becoming the Sea	Shuji	Lead role	
2025	Ikigake no Sora	Kento Mochizuki	Lead role	
2025	Echoes of Motherhood			
2026	The Secret Battlefield	Kamekichi Okuda		
2026	Two Cigarettes, Three Nights	Iwasa		
2027	Between Us			

=== TV dramas ===
Year	Title	Role	Notes	Ref.
2013	Saishū Tokkai	Kazuhiki Minami	Lead role	
2014	Caroling: Christmas no Kiseki	Shunsuke Yamato	Lead role	
2015	Burning Flower	Mōri Motonori	Taiga drama	
2016	Montage	Shinosuke Sawada (young, in 1968)	Miniseries	
2017	Shiawase no Kioku	Yukihiro Yoshioki	Television film	
2017	Zenigata Keibu	Shintaro Kunkida		
2019	Idaten	Kazuo Noda	Taiga drama	
2020	Yell	Takashi Tanaka	Asadora	
2022	Kamen Rider Black Sun	Bilgenia		
2025	Simulation: Defeat in the Summer of 1941	Soichi Minegishi	Miniseries	
2026	The Scent of the Wind	Kamekichi Okuda	Asadora	

=== Advertisements ===
Year	Title	Ref.
2010	Taisho Pharmaceutical Co. Lipovitan D	

== Awards and nominations ==
Year	Award	Category	Work(s)	Result	Ref.
2010	35th Hochi Film Awards	Best New Artist	Railways	Won	
2011	34th Japan Academy Film Prize	Newcomer of the Year	Railways	Won	
2013	86th Kinema Junpo Awards	Best New Actor	The Cowards Who Looked to the Sky, Dearest, Chronicle of My Mother	Won	
