= Ancient City (film) =

- Theatrical poster

Japanese name
- Kanji: 古都
Transcriptions
- Revised Hepburn: Koto
- Directed by: Kon Ichikawa
- Screenplay by: Shinya Hidaka; Kon Ichikawa
- Based on: The Old Capital by Yasunari Kawabata
- Produced by: Takeo Hori; Hideo Sasai
- Starring: Momoe Yamaguchi; Tomokazu Miura; Keiko Kishi; Masaya Oki
- Cinematography: Kiyoshi Hasegawa
- Edited by: Chizuko Osada
- Music by: Shinichi Tanabe
- Production company: Hori Planning Production
- Distributed by: Toho
- Release date: 6 December 1980 (Japan)
- Running time: 125 minutes
- Country: Japan
- Language: Japanese

Ancient City (Japanese: 古都, Hepburn: Koto), also known as The Old Capital is a 1980 Japanese drama film directed by Kon Ichikawa starring Momoe Yamaguchi and Tomokazu Miura in an adaptation of Yasunari Kawabata's novel The Old Capital. Momoe Yamaguchi and Masaya Oki made their last appearances in the film.

It is a remake of the 1963 film Twin Sisters of Kyoto.

== Cast ==
- Momoe Yamaguchi as Chieko Sada / Naeko
- Tomokazu Miura
- Masaya Oki as Ryusuke Mizuki
- Jun Hamamura
- Akiji Kobayashi as Endō
- Takeshi Katō as Yahei Mizuki
- Keiko Kishi as Shige Sada

== Release ==
Koto received a roadshow theatrical release in Japan on December 6, 1980 where it was distributed by Toho. It received a regular theatrical release in Japan on December 20, 1980.

== Reception ==
Donald Richie writes in The Japanese Movie that "Ichikawa dramatizes alienation in his remake of Kawabata's Koto, where twin sisters long-separated meet again and must face a dramatized estrangement."
