= Amuri in Star Ocean =

2007 three-part OVA by Studio Hibari

- Cover of the first manga

星の海のアムリ (Hoshi no Umi no Amuri)
- Genre: Sci-Fi
- Manga
- Written by: Yoshitomo Yonetani
- Illustrated by: Shinya Inase
- Published by: MediaWorks
- Magazine: Dengeki Daioh
- Original run: November 21, 2007 – 2008
- Volumes: 1
- Original video animation
- Directed by: Yoshitomo Yonetani
- Written by: Yoshitomo Yonetani
- Music by: Mina Kubota
- Studio: Studio Hibari CG Team
- Released: May 23, 2008
- Episodes: 3

Amuri in Star Ocean (星の海のアムリ, Hoshi no Umi no Amuri) is a three-part animated OVA by Studio Hibari, written and directed by Yoshitomo Yonetani with character designs by MA@YA. The soundtrack was composed by Mina Kubota and the theme song "Ya-chaouyo!" was composed by Dance Man. A manga illustrated by Shinya Inase started serialization in the shōnen manga magazine Dengeki Daioh on November 21, 2007. One volume compiling the chapter was published by ASCII Media Works on January 27, 2009.

== Plot ==
In the year 01 of the new age (2012), the sun began to radiate increased amounts of radiation. A few years later, very strong children with unique abilities, or 'Allergies', began to be born. Amuri Kakyoin is a 13-year-old girl born with a special 'Allergy', called 'Repulsion'. This ability keeps her from actually touching most of her environment, but also protects her from harm. During a trip to space station Pink Coral in year 019 (2030), unknown enemies from the junk planet Galapagos attack and destroy the entire space station. Amuri survives being launched into space because of her 'Allergy', but is picked up by the attackers. When the machines of Galapagos attempt to destroy her, a girl named Ling "Suzu" Yunque shows up with a kimono-like space suit designed from Amuri's DNA. The suit lets her use her 'Repulsion' ability on a large scale. Amuri has lived her whole life unable to touch other people, however, this cheerful and strange girl was not Repulsed upon contact.

== Characters ==
- Amuri Kakyoin (華凶院(かきょういん)アムリ, Kakyōin Amuri)

Voiced by: Yui Makino
Amuri is a 13-year-old Japanese girl, and an Adapter born with an Allergy called Repulsion.

- Perrier La Mer (ペリエ・ラ・メール, Perie Ra Mēru)

Voiced by: Momoko Saito
Perrier is a 14-year-old French girl, and an Adapter born with an Allergy called Infiltration.

- Líng Yúnquè (鈴(リン)云雀(ユンチェ), Rin Yunche)

Voiced by: Michiru Aizawa
Nicknamed Suzu, a 12-year-old Chinese girl, and an Adapter born with an Allergy called Escape.

- Pulmo Allen (プルモ・アレン, Purumo Aren)

Voiced by: Marika Matsumoto
Pulmo is a three-year-old American girl. She is an Adapter with no special Allergies, but she is very mature for her age and is called "Professor".

- Maria Sklodowska (マリア・スクロドフォスカ, Maria Sukurodofosuka)

Voiced by: Mamiko Noto
Maria is a 22-year-old Polish woman, and a normal human who works to help Adapters. She is Pulmo's caretaker.

- Deus Allen (デウス・アレン, Deusu Aren)

Voiced by: Kiyoshi Kobayashi
Deus is the father of Pulmo and president of Region Free, the Adapter support organization.

- Ukatan (うかたん, Ukatan)

Voiced by: Kiyoshi Kobayashi, Tomoko Kaneda
Full name UKATAN 09203, a robot called a Puppet Agent resembling a plush rabbit doll. Belongs to Perrier.

- Femina Novum (フェミナ・ノウム, Femina Noumu)

Voiced by: Aya Hirano
Femina is an 18-year-old British girl and the first known Adapter. She has an Allergy called Harmony.

== Episodes ==
1. Like Flowers Blooming in the Night Sky (夜空に花の咲くごとく, yozora ni hana no saku gotoku)
2. Birds Love the Pretty Flowers (小鳥は可憐な花が好き, kotori ha karen na hana ga suki)
3. Sea Birds Singing, Flowers Falling Asleep (花散り鳥鳴き海眠り, hana chiri tori naki umi nemuri)
