= White Love =

- Directed by: Tsugunobu Kotani
- Starring: Momoe Yamaguchi; Tomokazu Miura; Bunjaku Han
- Release date: 4 August 1979 (Japan)
- Country: Japan
- Language: Japanese

White Love (ホワイト・ラブ, Howaito rabu) is a 1979 romance film from Japan starring Momoe Yamaguchi, Tomokazu Miura, and Bunjaku Han. It was directed by Tsugunobu Kotani and filmed in Spain. It was the second of the Yamaguchi-Miura "golden combi"'s films shot outside Japan and also the second based on an original script rather than a literary work.
