= Yui Makino =

Japanese actress, singer, and pianist (born 1986)

- 牧野 由依
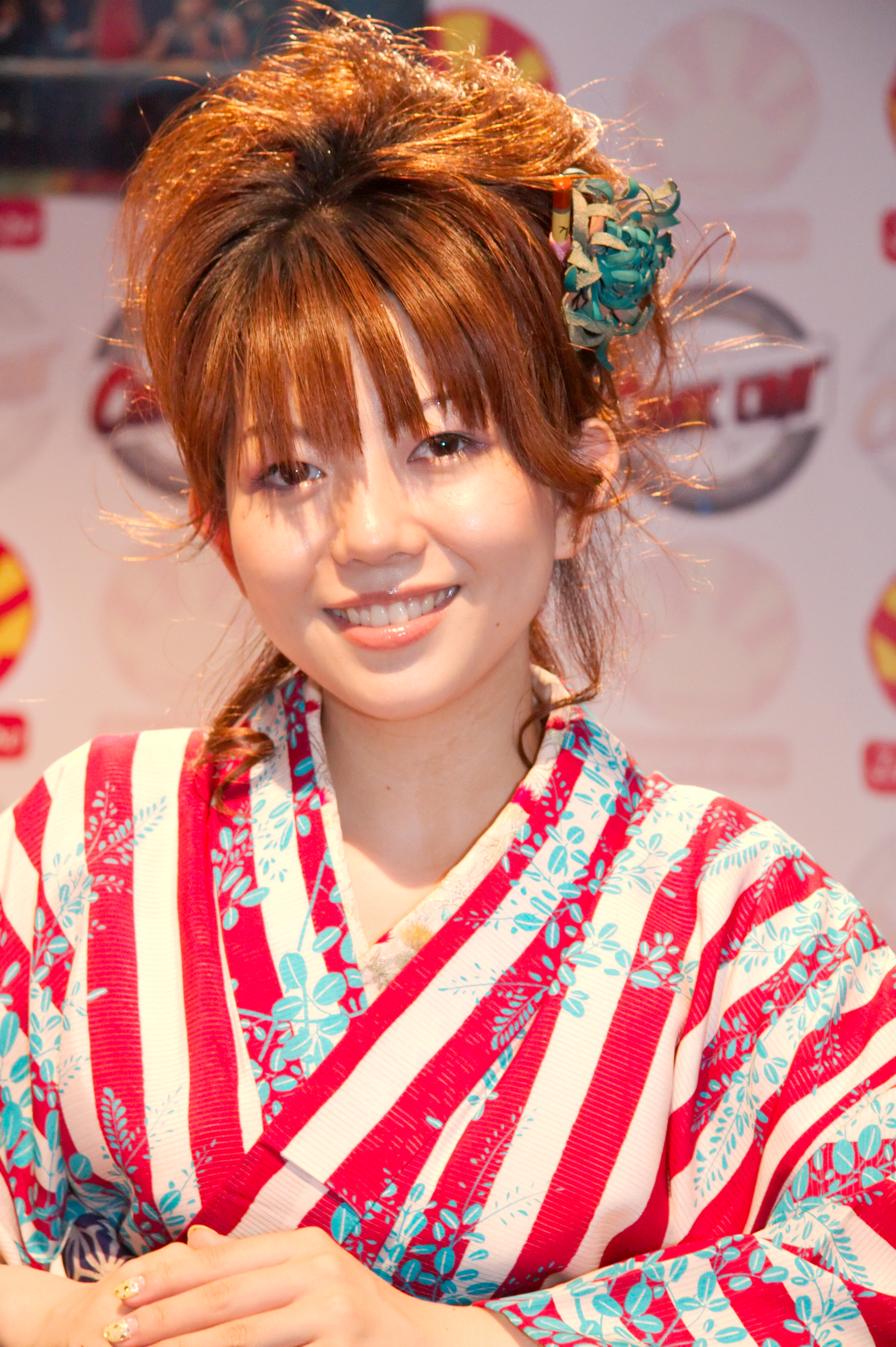
- Yui Makino in 2009
- Born: 19 January 1986 (age 40); Mie Prefecture, Japan
- Occupations: Actress; voice actress; singer; pianist
- Years active: 1989–present
- Agent: Amuse, Inc.
- Height: 155 cm (5 ft 1 in)
- Spouse: Yutaro Miura (m. 2020)
- Children: 1
- Relatives: Momoe Yamaguchi (mother-in-law); Tomokazu Miura (father-in-law)
- Musical career
- Genres: J-Pop; classical
- Instruments: Piano; keyboard; vocals; guitar
- Labels: Victor Entertainment (2005–2008); Epic Records (2009–2012); BGB Company; Amuse, Inc. (2012–present
- Website: yuiyuimakino.com

Yui Makino (牧野 由依, Makino Yui; born 19 January 1986) is a Japanese actress, voice actress, singer, and pianist. She is best known for her work in the anime Tsubasa: Reservoir Chronicle where she voices Sakura and some of the theme songs for the Aria anime series. She is associated with Amuse, Inc. One of her earliest voice acting performances was the character "Sister" in a short-anime movie Bavel no Hon when she was 10. She married singer Yutaro Miura in 2020.

== Musical history ==
Makino took up piano at the age of four. The film director Shunji Iwai discovered her talent for playing the piano when she was seven years old and from the age of 8 to 17. She played piano solos for three of his films: Love Letter, All About Lily Chou-Chou and Hana and Alice. She graduated from Tokyo College of Music as a piano major with the top score in her senior year.

She made her debut as a singer in 2005 with "Omna Magni," produced by Yoko Kanno. It was used as the ending theme song for the anime Sousei no Aquarion. In the April of the same year, she also debuted as a voice actress, starring as heroine Sakura in Tsubasa Chronicle and recording several songs for its soundtrack.

She released "Amrita", the ending song for the Tsubasa Chronicle film, as well as "Undine", the opening theme for the TV Tokyo anime Aria the Animation, coupled with its inserted song "Symphony". It achieved No. 25 on the Oricon chart.

In 2006, Makino released two songs from another TV Tokyo anime, Aria the Natural, the theme song "Euphoria" and an insert song, "Amefuribana." They were released on one product and achieved No. 18 on the Oricon chart. In addition, she released her debut album, Tenkyū no Ongaku on 6 December 2006.

In 2007, she was invited to represent Japan at the Japan-China cultural exchange event. She also released two singles for the programmes Sketchbook ~full color's~ and Tsubasa: Reservoir Chronicle.

On 23 January 2008, Makino released her seventh single, "Spirale," as the opening theme of Aria the Origination. Coupled with the anime's insert song, "Yokogao," the single reached No. 20 on the Oricon chart. She also performed her first solo concert at the Fuchuno Mori Geijutsu Gekijo Wien Hall in Tokyo, where she sang and played the piano accompaniment for each song. She released her eponymous second album, Makino Yui in March 2008. It reached No. 22 on the Oricon chart. She graduated from Tokyo College of Music as a piano major in the same month.

She held her Holography concert at SHIBUYA-AX in 2011.

In March 2013, Makino was hired to sing and be the "Hungry Zombie Francesca" voice in a national campaign to promote the Hokkaido region throughout Japan.

== Overseas guest appearances ==
- 2007: Japan Ambassador, Beijing (Japan-China Cultural Exchange)
- July 2009: Performance at Japan Expo, France
- September 2009: Guest of Honor, New York Anime Festival, USA
- 26 December 2009: Guest Artiste, Musical Concert in EOY at Drama Centre @ National Library, Singapore
- 16 January 2010: Guest Artiste, at Korea
- 19 June 2010: Concert, in Rome, Italy
- 21 June 2010: Ongaku no Hi in France, as guest
- September 2011: Concert in Hong Kong
- October 2011: Concert in Guangzhou
- November 2011: Anime Festival at Shanghai
- December 2012: Performance at J-FEST 2012, Russia
- December 2013: ACT Expo in Macau
- March 2015: TOUCH Spring Festival in Vietnam
- May 2015: Otafest in Canada
- July 2016: CharaExpo in Singapore
- August 2016: Otakon 2016, in USA

== Filmography ==
=== Anime television series ===
- Tsubasa Chronicle (2005) as Sakura
- Aria The Natural (2006) as Akane in episode 26
- Welcome to the NHK! (2006) as Misaki Nakahara
- Spider Riders: Oracle of Heroes (2006) as Girl in episode 7
- Coron-chan (2006) as Byobā
- Zegapain (2006) as Jen May-Yu
- Tsubasa Chronicle (2006) (second season) as Sakura
- Kaze no Stigma (2007) as Lapis Suirei/Cui Ling
- Bokurano (2007) as Aiko Tokosumi
- Sketchbook (2007) as Hazuki Torikai
- Asu no Yoichi! (2009) as Tsubasa Tsubame
- Sora Kake Girl (2009) as Honoka Kawai
- Taishō Yakyū Musume (2009) as Kyouko Sakurami
- Needless (2009) as Mio
- Nodame Cantabile: Finale (2010) as Namuri Rima (Episode 4)
- Angel Beats! (2010) as Yusa
- C (2011) as Hanabi Ikuta
- Ano Hi Mita Hana no Namae o Boku-tachi wa Mada Shiranai. (2011) as Aki
- Un-Go (2011) as Umezawa Yumeno
- Tokurei Sochi Dantai Stella Jo-Gakuin Kōtō-ka C3-Bu (2013) as Yura Yamato
- Chaika - The Coffin Princess (2014) as Layla
- Francesca: Girls Be Ambitious (2014) as Francesca
- Space Dandy (2014) as Freckles (ep.17)
- Gundam Build Fighters Try (2014) as Fumina Hoshino
- The Idolmaster Cinderella Girls (2015) as Mayu Sakuma
- Yamada-kun and the Seven Witches (2015) as Meiko Ōtsuka
- Wish Upon the Pleiades (2015) as Hikaru
- Ushio and Tora (2015) as Reiko Hanyuu
- The Idolmaster Cinderella Girls 2nd Season (2015) as Mayu Sakuma
- PriPara (2015) as Aroma Kurosu (eps.39–140)
- Hundred (2016) as Erica Candle
- Sekkō Boys (2016) as Mira Hanayashiki
- Shōnen Maid (2016) as Miyako Ōtori
- Sagrada Reset (2017) as Yōka Murase
- Love & Lies (2017) as Ririna Sanada
- King's Game The Animation (2017) as Kana Ueda
- Aikatsu on Parade! (2019) as Saya Kiseki
- Farewell, My Dear Cramer (2021) as Chika Kirishima
- Tokyo 24th Ward (2022) as Mari Sakuragi
- Life with an Ordinary Guy Who Reincarnated into a Total Fantasy Knockout (2022) as Ugraine
- Hell Teacher: Jigoku Sensei Nube (2025) as Shizuka Kikuchi

=== OVA and ONA ===
- Tsubasa Tokyo Revelations as Sakura
- Hōkago no Pleiades as Hikaru
- Hoshi no Umi no Amuri as Amuri
- Tsubasa Shunraiki as Sakura
- xxxHOLiC Shunmuki as Sakura
- Yamada-kun and the Seven Witches OVA as Meiko Ōtsuka

=== Anime films ===
- The Princess in the Birdcage Kingdom as Sakura
- Top wo Nerae 2! & Top wo Nerae! Gattai Gekijō-ban!! as Akaitakami
- PriPara Mi~nna no Akogare Let's Go PriPari (2016) as Aroma Kurosu

=== Video games ===
- Arc Rise Fantasia as Ryfia
- Which Witch? as Yuugi Saki
- Tsubasa Chronicle as Sakura
- Pachinko Sora wo Kakeru Shōjo!! as Honoka Kawai
- The Idolmaster Cinderella Girls as Mayu Sakuma
- Azur Lane as MNF La Galissonnière and MNF Marseillaise
- Alchemy Stars as Siobhan
- Wuthering Waves as Zhezhi
- Persona 5: The Phantom X as Ayaka Sakai

=== Drama CDs ===
- Welcome to the NHK! as Misaki Nakahara
- Wagamama Sentai Bloom Heart as Tougaiji Yuri a.k.a. White Lily
- Zegapain as Jen May-Yu
- Tsubasa Chronicle as Sakura

=== Live stage ===
- High Color (2009) as Seiki Tomoyo

=== Radio ===
- Yui to Mika no Puri Suite!-Tsubasa Chronicle radio, hosted by Yui Makino and Mika Kikuchi as host
- Sketchbook Radio-Sketchbook radio, hosted by Kana Hanazawa, Asuka Nakase and Yui Makino as host
- Puri Suite RETURNS!-Tsubasa Chronicle (second season) radio, hosted by Miyu Irino, Yui Makino, Mika Kikuchi, Tetsu Inada and Daisuke Namikawa as host
- Sore Kake Radio & TV-Sora Kake Girl radio, hosted by MAKO as a guest in several episodes
- ArcRise LADY RADIO HOUR-Arc Rise Fantasia radio, hosted by Yui Makino and Emiri Katō as host.
- Which Witch? Sora no Gakko Host Club?-Which Witch? radio, hosted by Asumi Kana and Aki Toyosaki as guest and host, replacing Aki in two episodes.
- Makino Yui no Daimondorobicchi-Makino's own radio.
- Makino Yui no Fuwa Fuwa Radio-Makino's own radio, for Fuwa Fuwa single promo.

== Discography ==
=== Singles ===
#	Information	Sales
1	"Amrita (アムリタ)": Released: 18 August 2005; Oricon Peak Position: No. 53; Weeks on Chart: 5; Ending theme song for Tsubasa Chronicle: The Princess of the Country of Birdcages	5,777 copies sold
2	"Undine (ウンディーネ)": Released: 21 October 2005; Oricon Peak Position: No. 25; Weeks on Chart: 15; Opening theme song for Aria the Animation.	16,316 copies sold
3	"Euforia (ユーフォリア)": Released: 26 April 2006; Oricon Peak Position: No. 18; Weeks on Chart: 6; Opening theme song for Aria the Natural	10,845 copies sold
4	"Modokashī Sekai no Ue de (もどかしい世界の上で)": Released: 25 October 2006; Oricon Peak Position: No. 58; Weeks on Chart: 2; Second ending theme song for Welcome to the N.H.K.	2,511 copies sold
5	"Sketchbook o Motta Mama (スケッチブックを持ったまま)": Released: 24 October 2007; Oricon Peak Position: No. 38; Weeks on Chart:5; Ending theme song for Sketchbook ~full color's~	5,881 copies sold
6	"Synchronicity": Released: 21 November 2007; Oricon Peak Position: No. 49; Weeks on Chart: 3; Opening theme song for Tsubasa Chronicle: Tokyo Revelations OVAs.	4,158 copies sold
7	"Spirale (スピラーレ)": Released: 23 January 2008; Oricon Peak Position: No. 20; Weeks on Chart: 9; Opening theme song for ARIA The ORIGINATION	10,688 copies sold
8	"Tanpopo Suisha (たんぽぽ水車)": Released: 7 October 2009; Oricon Peak Position: –; Weeks on Chart: –; Makino's version of the second ending theme song for Sketchbook ~full color's~	Single did not chart.
9	"Fuwa Fuwa♪ (ふわふわ♪)": Released: 3 March 2010; Oricon Peak Position: No. 50; Weeks on Chart: 1; Image song for Mielparque Sendai.	2,291
10	"Ao no Kaori (碧の香り)": Released: 10 November 2010; Oricon Peak Position: No. 55; Weeks on Chart: –; Ending theme song for Soul Eater Repeat Show.	2,142
11	"Onegai Jun Bright (お願いジュンブライト)": Released: 27 April 2011; Oricon Peak Position: No. 41; Weeks on Chart: –; CM song for Shiseido Elixir White.	N/A
12	"Sasayaki wa "Crescendo" (囁きは"Crescendo")": Released: 20 August 2014; Oricon Peak Position: No. 73; Weeks on Chart: –; Ending theme song for Fran♥cesca - Dead Idol	N/A

=== Albums ===
	Release	Title	Peak position	Time on chart	Sales
1st	6 December 2006	Tenkyū no Ongaku (天球の音楽Music of the Celestial Sphere): 1. Omna Magni (オムナ マグニ); 2. Undine (ウンディーネ); 3. Shiawase no Tameiki (幸せのため息; Happy Sigh); 4. Modokashii Sekai no Ue de (もどかしい世界の上で; On Top of A Frustrating World); 5. Symphony (シンフォニー); 6. Euforia (ユーフォリア); 7. Jasmine (ジャスミン); 8. Natsuyasumi no Shukudai (夏休みの宿題; Assignment of Summer Vacation); 9. Kami to Hairpin to Watashi (髪とヘアピンと私; Hair and Hairpin and Me); 10. Yume no Tsubasa (ユメノツバサ; Wings of Dreams); 11. Towa no Omoi (永遠の想い; Eternal Thoughts); 12. CESTREE (セストゥリー); 13. Ame Furibana -Album Version- (雨降花; Falling Flower in the Rain); 14. Amrita (アムリタ)	36	5 weeks	11,957 copies sold
2nd	26 March 2008	Makino Yui (マキノユイ): 1. Ame no Hi no Funsui (雨の日の噴水); 2. Marmalade (マーマラード); 3. Sangatsu Monogatari (三月物語); 4. Yokogao (横顔); 5. Spirale (スピラーレ); 6. Solfege (ソルフェージュ); 7. synchronicity 8. Tsuki no Shijima -ultimate mix- (つきのしじま); 9. Tooku Made Ikou (遠くまで行こう); 10. Sketchbook wo Motta Mama -Hikigatari- (スケッチブックを持ったまま -引き語り-); 11. DESTINY; 12. Watashi ni Tsuite (私について)	22	4 weeks	10,384 copies sold
3rd	6 July 2011	Holography (ホログラフィー): 1. Haru Machi Kaze (春待ち風); 2. Onegai Jun Bright (お願いジュンブライト); 3. Merry-go-round ~Album ver.~ 4. Fuwa Fuwa♪ (ふわふわ♪); 5. Cluster; 6. Precious; 7. hologram 8. crepuscular rays 9. Nidome no Hatsukoi (二度目のハツコイ); 10. Brand-new Sky; 11. Ao no Kaori (碧の香り); 12. Mirai no Hitomi wo Hiraku Toki (未来の瞳を開くとき); 13. Sono Saki he (その先へ)	27	N/A	N/A

== Awards ==
She was nominated for "best young voice actress" for her outstanding portrayal of Misaki Nakahara from Welcome to the N.H.K.

== Other ==
Anime soundtracks

- Omna Magni

Notes: This song was used as an ending theme song in Genesis of Aquarion.

- Sousei no Aquarion

Notes: This song was used as the intro theme song in Genesis of Aquarion.

- Yume no Tsubasa (ユメノツバサ)

Notes: She sang this song with a fellow voice actor, Miyu Irino, who voices Syaoran. The song was used as an ending theme song in the 3rd Drama CD of Tsubasa Chronicle.

- Tsuki no Shijima (つきのしじま)

Notes: This song was used as an insert song in episode 50 in Tsubasa Chronicle.

- Dark Side ni Tsuitekite

Notes: This song was used as an insert song in Welcome to the N.H.K.

- Synchronicity

Notes: This song is the opening theme song for Tsubasa Tokyo Revelations

- Tenshi no Hashigo ~crepuscular rays~

Notes: This song is the ending theme for Arc Rise Fantasia

- Imaginal Song

Notes: This song is one of Ryphia's songs with her vocalizing in Arc Rise Fantasia.

- Jouka no Hikari (Light of Purification)

Notes: This song is one of Ryphia's songs with her vocalizing in Arc Rise Fantasia

- Ryfia no Negai (Ryfia's Wish)

Notes: This song is one of Ryphia's songs with her vocalizing in Arc Rise Fantasia

- Ten no Namida (Heaven's Tears)

Notes: This song is one of Ryphia's songs with her vocalizing in Arc Rise Fantasia
Anime character songs

- Towa no Omoi

Notes: Found on the first Tsubasa Chronicle Drama & Character Album.

- Yacchaouyo!

Notes: This song was released on the first character song album for the OVA Amuri in Star Ocean.

- Umidorika -Amuri Ver.-

Notes: This song was released on the first character song album for the OVA Amuri in Star Ocean.

- Moroi Mirai Kirai (I Hate Fragile Future)

Notes: This song was released on the third character song album of Sora wo Kakeru Shōjo.

- Wakakusa iro no Kleiner Vogel (Light Green-colored Little Bird)

Notes: This song was released on the second character song album of Which Witch?
