= Shunkinshō (film) =

Shunkinsho
- Film poster
- Directed by: Katsumi Nishikawa
- Written by: Teinosuke Kinugasa; Katsumi Nishikawa
- Starring: Momoe Yamaguchi; Tomokazu Miura
- Cinematography: Kenji Hagiwara
- Edited by: Akira Suzuki
- Music by: Masaru Sato
- Distributed by: Toho
- Release date: December 25, 1976 (Japan)
- Running time: 97 minutes
- Country: Japan
- Language: Japanese

Shunkinsho (Japanese: 春琴抄), also known as A Portrait of Shunkin, is a 1976 film adaptation of a short story by Jun'ichirō Tanizaki. The director of the film is Katsumi Nishikawa, and the cast includes Momoe Yamaguchi and Tomokazu Miura. The film is part of a series of love stories featuring Miura and Yamaguchi, who eventually married in real life.

== Plot summary ==
Set in 19th-century Osaka, the film tells the story of a love affair between Sasuke (Miura) and blind koto teacher Shunkin (Yamaguchi), who lost her sight at the age of nine. Despite her blindness, Shunkin demonstrates extraordinary skill in playing traditional Japanese instruments such as the three-stringed shamisen and thirteen-stringed koto. Renowned as a musician, she also teaches music to others.

The film delved into the psychological study of Shunkin, and her struggles as a young woman aware of the experiences she will never have due to her blindness. Her life takes a significant turn when she agrees to teach music to Sasuke, a young man who also serves as her student and servant. Sasuke's attempts to please Shunkin lead to a unique and melancholic romantic relationship between them.

Despite Shunkin's initial resistance, the two are drawn closer together. Shunkin becomes aware of Sasuke's feelings for her but is hesitant to accept them. However, she finds herself unable to live without his love.

Tragedy strikes when Shunkin's face is disfigured by boiling water thrown at her while she sleeps, orchestrated by a rejected suitor. Losing her beauty, which has been a source of pride and strength in coping with her blindness, leaves Shunkin feeling vulnerable and scared. She hides her scarred face behind bandages and forbids Sasuke from looking at her.

As their bond deepens, Sasuke blinds himself to fully immerse himself in Shunkin's world and offer her unwavering support. Shunkin eventually surrenders to Sasuke's love, and they embrace their feelings openly. They continue to live together, studying and performing music in harmony, united by their love and dedication to each other.

== Cast ==
- Momoe Yamaguchi as Okoto
- Tomokazu Miura as Sasuke
- Ikue Sakakibara as Okichi
- Akira Nagoya as Zensuke
- Masahiko Tsugawa as Minoya
