= Yutaro Miura =

Japanese singer-songwriter and actor (born 1984)

Yutaro Miura 三浦 祐太朗
- Also known as: Yu
- Born: 30 April 1984 (age 42); Tokyo, Japan
- Genres: J-pop; rock
- Occupations: Singer-songwriter; actor
- Instruments: vocals; guitar; Gibson J-200; Martin D-28; Epiphone Casino; Yamaha FG-500
- Years active: 2002–present
- Labels: Universal J (2012–2013); Tower Records (2014)
- Spouse: Yui Makino (m. 2020)
- Website: Official website

Yutaro Miura (三浦 祐太朗, Miura Yūtarō; born 30 April 1984, in Tokyo) is a Japanese singer-songwriter and actor. He is the vocalist of the rock band Peaky Salt (now inactive) under the name Yu (ユウ, Yū). He is represented with Dream Zero-One Inc.

== Early life ==
Miura was born at Sanno Hospital in Tokyo, His father is actor Tomokazu Miura. His mother is former singer and actress Momoe Yamaguchi. Miura is the eldest of two brothers, his younger brother is Takahiro Miura, who is also an actor. His cousin is actor and tarento Kenta Itogi. He married voice actress and singer, Yui Makino in 2020.

== Discography ==
=== Singles ===
	Title	Date
1st	Tabidachi	1 August 2012
2nd	The Walk / wktk Reverse	5 March 2014
3rd	Hoshikuzu Merry-go-round	27 January 2015

=== Albums ===
	Title	Date
1st	Daisy Chain	30 April 2014
2nd	Flowers	1 August 2018
3rd	Blooming Hearts	2 October 2019

=== Cover albums ===
	Title	Date
1st	I'm Home	5 July 2017

=== Mini albums ===
	Title	Date
1st	And You	20 February 2013

== Music videos ==
Director	Song
Hiroyuki Fukuhara	"Kienai Niji"
Unknown	"Hoshikuzu Merry-go-round", "The Walk"

== Filmography ==
=== Radio ===
Year	Title	Network
2012	Yutaro Miura The Wind Sing	FM Nack5
2013	Ayano Fukuda, Yutaro Miura, Yoichiro Omi no wktk Radio Gakuen Dunday	NHK Radio 1
2014	Kirameki Music Star "Kirasuta"	FM Nack5

=== Stage ===
Year	Title	Role	Ref.
2012	Tabidachi –Ashoro yori–	Chiharu Matsuyama	
2014	Flamenco Sonezaki Shinjū	Tokubei	

=== Television ===
Year	Title	Role	Network
2012	Waratte Iitomo!		Fuji TV
2012	Arigato'!		tvk
2013	Garigeru		YTV
2013	Music Fair		Fuji TV
2013	Onryu		TV Tokyo
2014	Pati Pati		Music On! TV
2014	Utage!		TBS
2014	Studio Park kara konnichiwa		NHK
2014	Ongaku no Hi		TBS
2014	Utage Aki no Saiten! Ano Dai Hit Kyoku o Utai Odoru Utage no 2-jikan SP!		TBS
2014	Tetsuko no Heya		TV Asahi
2014	Non Stop! Tokubetsuhan 2015-nen mo Dokuji ni Sakidori SP		Fuji TV
2015	Live B		2015
2015	Utage! Aki no Saiten Ano Dai Hit Kyoku o Utai Odoru Utage no 2-jikan SP!		2015
2015	Boku-ra wa Manga de Tsuyoku natta Sports×Manga		NHK BS1
2015	Utage Aki no Saiten!		TBS
2016	Utage! Natsu no Saiten 2-jikan Special		TBS
2016	Style Plus		THK
2016	Non Mama Hakusho	Makocchan	Fuji TV
2016	Utage! Aki no Saiten 2-jikan Special		TBS
2016	Doyonaka Fes!!		Fuji TV

=== Advertisements ===
Year	Title
2016	Hataraku Uniqlo

=== Live ===
Title	Year	Location
Rex Mania –Voice vol2–	2012	Shibuya Rex
Rex Mania –Natsuyasumi–	2012	Shibuya Rex
Yutaro Miura Hatsu One Man Live 2012 "The Walk"	2012	Sogetsu Hall
Rex Mania –Shibuya Rex 1st Anniversary Live–	2012	Shibuya Rex
Yutaro Miura Christmas Live "Snowflakes 2012"	2012	Mt. Rainier Hall Shibuya Pleasure Pleasure
Ikemen's × Yutaro Miura	2012	Shibuya Rex
Yutaro Miura One Man Live "Blossom"	2013	Osaka Muse
Yutaro Miura One Man Live "Blossom"	2013	Harajuku Astro Hall
"Tabidachi" kara no Saikai Live –Udagawamachi yori–	2013	Shibuya WWW
Manatsu no Uta Mi	2013	Shibuya Rex
	2013	Matsuyama Salon City
	2013	Takamatsu Dime
	2013	Kochi X-pt.
Next Generation	2013	Nagoya ell. Fits All
	2013	Crazymania Kingdom
	2013	Namiki Junction
Sound Jack	2013	Kyoto FanJ
Shibuya Desco Presents "Acoustic Syndrome"	2013	Shibuya Desco
Ao no Ongakkai	2013	Shibuya Duo Music Exchange
New days –X'mas Special 2013–	2013	Shibuya Loop annex
New days –Yutaro Miura × Unist–	2014	Daikanyama Loop
Osaka One Man Live	2014	Osaka Soap Opera Classics
Force Beat Match vol, 2	2014	Hamamatsu Force
Sakae Beat Match	2014	Nagoya HeartLand Studio
Frank!! –Yutaro Miura × Jonte–	2014	Daikanyama Loop
Yutaro Miura One Man Live "rainy daisy"	2014	Daikanyama Loop
Yutaro Miura "Daisy East"	2014	Daikanyama Loop
Ikari Rikes Hall Renewal Kinen "Yutaro Miura Acoustic Live"	2014	Ikari Rikes Hall
Yutaro Miura "Daisy West"	2014	Umeda Zeela
Ao no Ongakkai vol. 2	2014	Mt. Rainier Hall Shibuya Pleasure Pleasure
Yutaro Miura 3rd.single "Hoshikuzu Merry-go-round" Release Tour	2015	Kobe Slope
Yutaro Miura 3rd.single "Hoshikuzu Merry-go-round" Release Tour	2015	Nagoya HeartLand Studio
Yutaro Miura 3rd.single "Hoshikuzu Merry-go-round" Release Tour	2015	Shibuya eggman
Otodama Sora Fes 2015 –Natsu, Chokuzen no Matsuri– "Sorahibi"	2015	H.L.N.A Skygraden Yagai Stage
Yutaro Miura "31 Ai Scream"	2015	Shibuya Take Off 7
Yutaro Miura "One And All"	2015	Harajuku Astro Hall
Kochi Bay5 Square Box	2015	Bay5 Square Box
Otodama Sea Studio 2015 Zilcona presents Connecelock –Kaisuiyoku Special– supported by Kimidake Live	2015	Otodama Sea Studio
Yutaro Miura 4 Toshi Tour "Manatsu no Sha Otomatsuri 2015"	2015	Abeno Rocktown
Yutaro Miura 4 Toshi Tour "Manatsu no Sha Otomatsuri 2015"	2015	Nagoya HeartLand Studio
Yutaro Miura 4 Toshi Tour "Manatsu no Sha Otomatsuri 2015"	2015	Sendai Flying Son
Yutaro Miura 4 Toshi Tour "Manatsu no Sha Otomatsuri 2015"	2015	Shibuya Star Lounge
ikari presents Yutaro Miura Acoustic Live	2015	Ikari Rikes Hall
Ao no Ongakkai vol.3	2015	Tokyo kinema Club
Utai Zome	2016	Shibuya WWW
Shinjuku Ruido K4 10th Anniversary Special Two Man Live	2016	Shinjuku Ruido K4
Easter Egg 2016	2016	Shibuya eggman
Birthday Live 2016	2016	Mt. Rainier Hall Shibuya Pleasure Pleasure

=== Event appearances ===
Year	Title
2012	"United States of Odaiba" The Next! Morning Show!
2012	Saitama Festa 2012
2012	Hyōgo Prefecture University of Marketing and Distribution Sciences school festival
2013	"Kazuo Tokumitsu toku Mori" no
2013	Nack5 Special Live
2013	A Happy Thanks Year 25th Anniversary We Love Saitama We Love Nack5
2013	Crime Victim Assistance Nadeshiko Charity Match
2013	Support for Victims of Crime Charity Concert
2013	Live Event in Marui Sunshine Bazaar
2013	Support for Victims of Crime Charity Concert
2015	Red Ribbon Live 2015
2016	East Japan Great Earthquake Disaster Reconstruction Assistance "The 8th Tokyo Boys Collection"
