= Arc Rise Fantasia =

2009 video game

- North American cover art
- Developers: Imageepoch; Marvelous Entertainment
- Publishers: JP: Marvelous Entertainment; NA: Ignition Entertainment
- Director: Hiroyuki Kanemaru
- Producers: Hideyuki Mizutani; Ryoei Mikage
- Designer: Osamu Hisano
- Programmer: Takashi Kawamoto
- Artists: Kenichi Yoshida; Shin Nagasawa
- Writer: Takumi Miyajima
- Composers: Yasunori Mitsuda; Shunsuke Tsuchiya; Yuki Harada
- Platform: Wii
- Release: JP: June 4, 2009; NA: July 27, 2010
- Genre: Role-playing
- Mode: Single-player

Arc Rise Fantasia (Note: Āku Raizu Fantajia (Japanese: アークライズファンタジア)) is a 2009 role-playing video game (RPG) co-developed by Imageepoch and Marvelous Entertainment for the Wii. It was published in Japan by Marvelous Entertainment in 2009 and in North America by Ignition Entertainment in 2010. A planned European release through Rising Star Games was cancelled. Set in a fantasy world split between hostile factions beset by attacks from destructive Feldragons, the story follows mercenary L'Arc Bright Lagoon after he is saved by the priestess Ryfia and chosen as a Child of Easa, a figure who can remake the world. Gameplay features a growing party led by L'Arc navigating both an overworld and dungeon environments, taking part in turn-based battles.

Production lasted three years, with Nintendo approaching the developers to create an RPG for the Wii. The team included Tales scenario writer Takumi Miyajima, and artists Kenichi Yoshida and Shin Nagasawa. The music was a collaborative effort between Yasunori Mitsuda, Shunsuke Tsuchiya and Yuki Harada, with the theme song written and performed by Ryfia's voice actress Yui Makino. Debuting to poor sales, the game saw a mixed reaction from critics, with most of the praise going towards its battle system. Reactions to its story, music, and graphics were more varied. A recurring complaint was the localization and English dub, with Ignition later admitting its poor quality and changing its localization partners.

== Gameplay ==
An early battle in Arc Rise Fantasia: party member Alphonse attacks an enemy.

Arc Rise Fantasia is a role-playing video game (RPG) where players principally take on the role of protagonist L'Arc Bright Lagoon and a growing party of companions. The story is communicated through full motion cutscenes using CGI or in-game character models, visual novel-like voiced sequences showing dialogue between characters represented as portraits, and text-based "Skits" activated by the player during exploration. Controlling L'Arc, the player navigates overworld zones, and more detailed dungeon and town environments. In towns, the party can interact with shop keepers to buy supplies and items such as weapons and armor or accessories. Guilds found through the game give access to side quests. The player can also engage in a slot machine minigame to win powerful equipment and items using special coins found during exploration. Similar rare items and equipment can be earned by defeating special monsters in dungeons.

Combat is triggered upon running into an enemy sprite in a dungeon or overworld, with player or enemy ambushes impacting the party's starting performance. The battle system, dubbed the "Trinity Battle System", uses turn-based mechanics, with the party and enemies each getting opportunities to act; the player's party is limited to three, with an AI-controlled fourth character joining during certain story-driven sections. Actions available to the party are attacking, defending, using skills and equipped magic, passing or moving their turn which changes that character's position in the turn order, and using an item. All combatants draw on a shared pool of Action Points (AP), with all actions requiring AP and one character able to take multiple turns. Magic spells require both AP and magic points to cast successfully. If a party member is knocked out, the AP meter shrinks, though skills are reduced in price to compensate. Characters can be individually controlled, or the player can use an AI command "Tactics" menu to activate preset commands for one turn based on behavioral instructions, with the party automatically carrying the instructions out.

Each character has a character class which dictates their strengths and ability growth. Several mechanics revolve around character cooperation. Using two consecutive identical spells on an enemy triggers "Tandem Sync", allowing a free follow-up attack regardless of the turn order and triggering a combo, additionally granting special effects such as increased AP during the next turn. Magic is learned and equipped using Orbs slotted into a character's weapon, with the slot being limited by its size and the shape of Orbs; Orbs degrade over time and must be repaired in towns. Special character skills called Excel Arts are fuelled by another resource called SP. The most powerful are Trinity Acts, when a set of three Excel Arts are chained together to perform a powerful combined move. Some characters can also summon Rogress, magical beings with powerful attacks that draw on their own power metre which fills up during battle. Defeating an enemy grants experience points and in-game currency.

== Synopsis ==
=== Setting and characters ===
Arc Rise Fantasia is set in the fantasy world of Fulheim, which is split between three competing political factions; the Meridian Empire, the Turmelian Republic, and a theocratic alliance of countries dubbed Olquina which is controlling the flow of a vital energy called Ray. All three are worshippers of the creator deity Easa, espousing different interpretations of their "Law" dubbed the Real and Imaginal. Legend says that Easa must be presented with a chosen version of the Law to form the foundation of the world; the Real Law advocates destroying the current world to create a new one, while the Imaginal Law seeks the continuation of the current world. Each faction has a priestess of Easa dubbed a Diva, who have magical powers based on their song. By the game's events, flocks of monsters called Feldragons have started appearing, and parts of the world are being crystallized by an energy called Hozon.

The main protagonist is L'Arc Bright Lagoon, a noted mercenary working with the Empire who has a taciturn personality. He partners at an early point with Ryfia, the Imaginal Diva of the Turmelian Republic whose sheltered upbringing leaves her socially awkward. L'Arc is childhood friends with Alfonse "Alf" Zena Meridia, current heir to the Imperial throne after his brother Weiss Dona Meridia, and Adele Nevanlinna who has secret affection for L'Arc. L'Arc is joined during the campaign by Cecille Garcia, a young girl with combat skills; Serge, a flirtatious mercenary thief; Leslie Ferrati, an agent from the Republic; and Rastan Oigen, an enigmatic swordsman. Other characters include Niko Bennex, a notoriously cowardly Imperial soldier; Dynos, a man with power to command the undead; Ignacy, a leader of the political and criminal underworld; and Hosea, Patriarch of the Imaginal faith.

=== Plot ===
During a battle with a Feldragon swarm, L'Arc is saved from one's death explosion by Ryfia, who disperses the Feldragon with her song. They later meet up with Alphonse and Niko, and see Rastan fighting Dylon with both escaping in the chaos. Ryfia leaves for the forbidden Feldragon Prison, with L'Arc and Alphonse following and the three forced to enter when ambushed by Dymos. Ryfia locates a Rogress inside, and L'Arc becomes a Child of Easa representing the Imaginal Law. This action destroys the Empire's remaining Ray supply, prompting Weiss to arrest L'Arc and Ryfia and force them on a mission into Olquina to deactivate a device blocking Ray from the Empire. L'Arc's home is then attacked by thieves hired by the criminal Ignacy and targeting Adele. Serge, who was among the thieves, helps the party reach Olquina on the ship, going on to team up with Leslie and narrowly escape another attack by Dymos.

Adele is kidnapped and awakened as Diva of the Real Law, and Weiss arrives with an invasion fleet to kill Adele, turning on L'Arc and Alphonse when they try to stop him. L'Arc summons his Rogress, which injures Adele and triggers Alphonse to awaken as a second Child of Easa aligned to the Real Law. An enraged Adele almost kills them but is calmed and rescued by Alphonse; Adele, Dymos, Serge and Leslie are all revealed to be aligned with the Real Law. Weiss, who despises both Laws, gives L'Arc, Niko and Cecille a final mission to go as emissaries to the Republic; the mission turns out to be an open provocation to war, which causes L'Arc's group to be arrested. They escape with help from Rastan, taking shelter in the remains of Ryfia's home under the protection of Hosea. There they learn that L'Arc can stop the Hozone's effects on the world by gathering Rogress and meeting with Easa to enact the Imaginal Law.

During their journey, L'Arc fights both the Imperial forces led by Weiss, who was cursed by Easa, and corruption within the Republic orchestrated by Ignacy and Hosea to further the Imaginal Law. Serge and Leslie eventually join L'Arc as he proves his willingness to save people on all sides of the conflict. Adele and Alphonse in turn support and Rogress for the Real Law, though Adele manipulates Alphonse into killing Weiss. Ignacy and Hosea seek to create a new Child of Easa as their puppet. It is eventually revealed that a thousand years before, a Hozone blight nearly wiped out the earlier Divine Race, with infected members turning into Feldragons; Cecille, Rastan and Dynos are survivors of the Divine Race who went into hibernation. The Imaginal Law resulted in the birth of the current Common Race, designed to survive the remaining Hozone. If either Law is enacted by a Child of Easa, one of the Races will be wiped out. L'Arc is also revealed to be Weiss's illegitimate brother, descended from both Divine and Common Races. L'Arc decides to create a new Law which will allow both Races to exist.

Ignacy and Hosea kidnap Niko to force Alphonse and L'Arc to give up their power and create a new Child of Easa, but Adele dies to save Alphonse and the party kill Ignacy and Hosea. Niko sacrifices himself to stop a Divine Race weapon as they escape, and a disillusioned Alphonse allows L'Arc to destroy the Real Law's magical core after defeating the corrupted Dynos, opening the way to Easa. The party defeats Easa, revealed to be a construct with an artificial human as its core, and L'Arc takes control of the system so the Hozone can be removed and both Races saved. Since this will take five centuries, his companions vow to improve the world in his absence. A post-credits scene shows the awakened L'Arc reuniting with Ryfia, who hibernated to remain by his side.

== Development ==
Arc Rise Fantasia was a co-production between Imageepoch and Marvelous Entertainment, the latter acting as publisher. They had previously worked together on Imageepoch's first game Luminous Arc (2007). Imageepoch founder and CEO Ryoei Mikage acted as co-producer with Marvelous's Hideyuki Mizutani. Mikage had been introduced to Mizutani through a mutual friend, and during production on the Luminous Arc series, they were approached by Nintendo about making an RPG for the Wii, which had a deficit of that genre. The team accepted, wanting to pay tribute to other notable RPG series of the time, which had their origins on Nintendo consoles. Mizutani had also long wished to produce an RPG. Mikage's target audience for the game was the "hardcore" RPG demographic. The production was described as a highly collaborative effort between the different divisions, with each bringing up ideas for making the game and putting effort and care into the final product. Initially known under the codename "Project Ray", production lasted three years. Many of the lead production staff, which included several notable names, was assembled quickly due to pre-existing working relationships with Imageepoch. Mizutani attributed the development of Luminous Arc with bringing together the staff who would create Arc Rise Fantasia. Among the team were several veterans of the Tales series, including director Hiroyuki Kanemaru. When Kanemaru came on board, the game's platform had already been decided; he joined when a mutual acquaintance directed him towards Imageepoch, and he found the project had several former co-workers already involved.

As with Imageepoch's other titles, the game used a fantasy setting. The narrative was the first part of the game to be created, with the team wanting a unique worldview with memorable characters and a wide range of emotion. To this end the team brought in Takumi Miyajima, who had previously written the scenarios of Tales of Symphonia (2003) and Tales of the Abyss (2005). Miyajima is credited as both scenario supervisor, and co-writer alongside Miyuki Kishimoto, Toru Shizuki and Kohei Ohta. The slogan Mizutani created for the scenario was "Let's make an RPG that will make you cry", with Mikage also requesting a scenario that would make players weep. The team looked for inspiration to multiple anime series, with Code Geass being cited as a particular inspiration for the emotional tone. They also wanted the cast to reflect recent trends of character development in anime and manga, feeling that video games had not caught up. There were some delays finalizing the scenario, delaying the rest of production by six months. Prior to release, the team were drafting plans for a potential trilogy, with the sequels depending on the first game's sales.

The character design drafts were created by Kenichi Yoshida, known for his work on the anime series Eureka Seven. In contrast to the other lead developers, it took time to bring Yoshida on board as the team wanted character designs unlike those seen in other games at the time. Mizutani personally met up with Yoshida several times over two months, eventually persuading him to come on board. The team considered Yoshida's style as best fitting with the planned scenario. Creating 3D versions of Yoshida's designs, particularly lead protagonist L'Arc, was a difficult process that Kanemaru had to supervise in person. The Rogress summons were designed by Shin Nagasawa. Models for the CGI cutscenes were designed by Image Corporation, while the cutscenes themselves were created in-house by Imageepoch.

The battle design was led by Osamu Hisano. The programmer was Takashi Kawamoto, who would later work as a battle designer on Final Fantasy XIV: Shadowbringers. While the team overall wanted something new and innovative, being another area where they felt the video game industry was being slow to change, they also kept many traditional elements in the gameplay so as not to alienate genre fans. The gameplay design drew a lot of inspiration from Tales of Symphonia, which many staff members had fond memories of working on. The controls were designed to be traditional rather than relying on the console's motion controls, allowing for long play sessions. The combat system was created around the concept of what Mikage called "link-up combat". The three-person party was considered the best balance, allowing the mechanics and AI to work the smoothest. The team wanted to keep the battles as low-stress as possible, though flashy animations and special attack cutscenes were added at Marvelous's request. The large overworld was planned from an early stage at Kanemaru's insistence, contrasting against selectable self-contained locations on other Wii RPGs. Adjustments to the gameplay were happening late into development, with Mikage focusing on making the battle system as fast and enjoyable as possible within the turn-based system they chose. Keeping loading times as short as possible was also a consideration.

=== Music ===
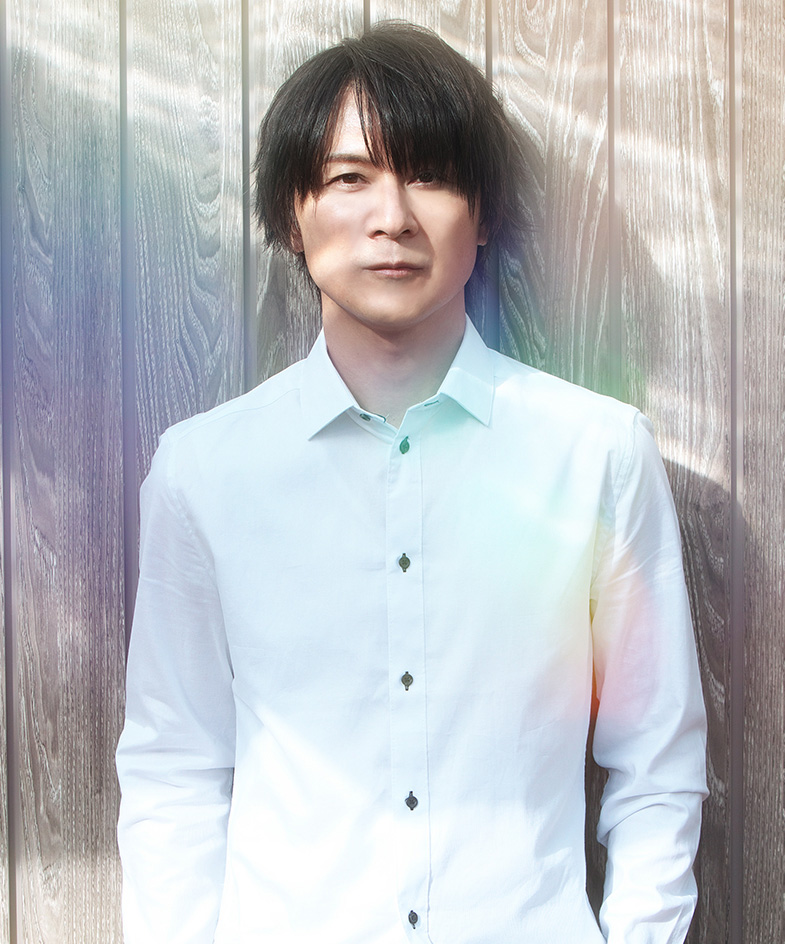
Yasunori Mitsuda (pictured 2019) was music producer and co-composer for Arc Rise Fantasia.

The music was produced by Yasunori Mitsuda, also founder and head of independent music company Procyon Studio; the group had previously worked with Imageepoch on Luminous Arc. Mitsuda co-composed the score with Shunsuke Tsuchiya, also of Procyon Studio, and Yuki Harada. The soundtrack remains Harada's only video game work. As was his policy at this time, Mitsuda refused to compose music for the game until it was complete, allowing him to match his score to the finished product. He also noted that the music was in a style unlike his previous RPG compositions. The soundtrack was themed around "light", which was a recurring story and visual motif. Tsuchiya described his work as mostly focusing on battle themes, and attributed pieces with rock elements to Harada. Tsuchiya also arranged two tracks from Luminous Arc 2 composed by Yoko Shimomura. Tsuchiya considered Arc Rise Fantasia both his most challenging project due to the work load and fan anticipation, and the "culmination" of his skills up to then.

The ending theme, "Angel Stairs ~crepuscular rays~", was written and performed by Ryfia's Japanese voice actress Yui Makino, and arranged by Tsuneyoshi Saito. Makino requested to Mizutani that she write the theme after reading the scenario, with Mizutani agreeing after hearing a demo she put together. The theme was performed by Makino in Japanese, with a chorus in Latin by Hanae Tomaru. Makino also provided vocals for several in-game themes, sung in a fictional language. Makino described these themes as challenging to sing due to the non-standard rhythms. The theme "Song of Ruin" was performed by Adele's voice actress Emiri Katō. A licensed theme, "Negai Hoshi" performed by Nami Tamaki and later released both as a digital release and as part of her single Friends!, was used in promotional trailers.

A selection of thirteen tracks were released as a pre-order bonus. A 3-CD soundtrack album was published by Team Entertainment on March 3, 2010. There was originally no album planned, though Mitsuda raised the possibility of tracks appearing on compilation albums. The full album was produced based on requests from fans of the soundtrack.

== Release ==
Arc Rise Fantasia was announced in June 2008, being notable as Imageepoch's first home console game. It was exhibited in playable form at the 2008 Tokyo Game Show. Part of the game's promotion was radio programs distributed through the game website with some of the Japanese cast. It was released in Japan on June 4, 2009. The official website opened on March 6 of that year, featuring information on the game and links to a developer blog. As a pre-order bonus when orders opened in March of that year, Marvelous created the "Arc Light Symphony", a media collection featuring a soundtrack selection, an art book with developer comments, and a booklet featuring both behind-the-scenes material and a prequel novella written by Miyajima. To conform with the game's CERO rating, the character Leslie's outfit was made less revealing than seen in pre-rating media. A complete strategy guide was released by Enterbrain on August 12.

A Western localization was confirmed by Marvelous in 2008, with the original plan being for a release through their partnership with Xseed Games. Mikage confirmed following the Japanese release that Imageepoch was collaborating on the localization. By October 2009, Marvelous made the decision to have Arc Rise Fantasia published in North America by Ignition Entertainment. The stated reason given by Xseed was Marvellous wanting to "increase its overall profitability" by licensing the publishing to a third party. The game was released in North America on July 27, 2010. It was originally announced for a European release through regular Marvelous partner Rising Star Games, but in 2011 Rising Star confirmed that the game would not be released in Europe.

The translation and localization were handled by Japanese company Entalize, then a frequent collaborator with Ignition which had been criticised for their work on Nostalgia (2008) and Muramasa: The Demon Blade (2009). Prior to release, Ignition's Shane Bettenhausen defended the dub as being "on par, but maybe not the level" with other titles such as the Final Fantasy series, citing the localization as a challenge due to incorporating Xseed's completed work. In a later 2011 interview, Bettenhausen stated Ignition had parted ways with Entalize after negative reactions to the dub. In both interviews, Bettenhausen stated that Ignition had learned lessons from the localization of Arc Rise Fantasia, taking a different approach with future localizations. The Japanese dub was not included overseas, a fact alternately attributed to disc space limitations and failure to secure the rights.

== Reception ==
Reception

Aggregate score
Aggregator	Score
Metacritic	64/100

Review scores
Publication	Score
1Up.com	C+
Famitsu	8/10, 8/10, 8/10, 8/10
GameRevolution	C
GamesRadar+	3/5
GameTrailers	6/10
IGN	6.5/10
Nintendo Life	7/10
Nintendo Power	7.5/10
Nintendo World Report	7/10
RPGamer	3.5/5
RPGFan	82%

During its first week on sale, Arc Rise Fantasia debuted in fourth place in gaming charts, selling 26,000 units. By the end of the year, the game had sold just over 49,000 units. Speaking on the poor Japanese sales, Marvelous's Yasuhiro Wada noted that third-party products for the Wii were historically difficult to sell compared to first-party Nintendo products. The game failed to break into the top twenty best-selling games in North America during its release week.

The game received "mixed" reviews according to the review aggregation website Metacritic, garnering a score of 64 points out of 100 based on 26 reviews. A recurring feeling among reviewers was that Arc Rise Fantasia was a mechanically sound RPG let down by below-average execution or a lack of budget in aspects of its production. (Note: Attributed to multiple references:)

RPGFan's felt that Arc Rise Fantasia "captures the heart and soul of the Japanese RPG so wonderfully that it will be easy enough to overlook the flaws", giving praise to its narrative and gameplay design. Andrew Fitch, writing for 1Up.com, noted the mechanical and narrative similarities to the Tales series, and recommended it for fans of that series while warning that it had copied both good and bad elements. GameTrailers also described its design as "almost a carbon copy" of recent Tales titles, praising its gameplay design while faulting its production values and other issues with its story and overall progression balance. Nintendo Power's Justin Cheng again noted its similarities to the Tales series, but explicitly praised it for creating a similar experience, with his main issue being with the voice acting. Cassandra Ramos of RPGamer praised the game overall and positively compared it to both the Tales and Luminous Arc series, citing the localization as the one poor aspect of the game.

The four reviewers for Japanese gaming magazine Famitsu were overall positive about the game, but cited a lack of innovative elements in its design or structure to help it stand out. GamesRadar's Carolyn Gudmundson cited it as an enjoyable but highly traditional RPG, with her major complaints outside its presentation being with its Tactics feature being simplistic compared to the similar system from Final Fantasy XIII. Corbie Dillard of Nintendo Life noted the game as being a well-executed example of a Japanese RPG, but not doing anything innovative or unexpected for players. Josh Laddin of GameRevolution was generally positive about its combat design, but also found its design overly derivative of other RPGs and lacking original elements. Anthony Gallegos of IGN, while finding fault with many elements of the game's presentation including its narrative and sound design, enjoyed his time playing due to its combat system. Nintendo World Report's Pedro Hernandez highlighted the combat and gameplay design as the game's greatest strength, faulting most other aspects as either poorly done or derivative.

The narrative met with praise from several reviewers for its interesting twists and complexity, (Note: Attributed to multiple references:) though others found it cliched and standard for the genre. The combat system was generally praised for its fast pace and breadth of customization options, (Note: Attributed to multiple references:) though several reviewers highlighted difficulty spikes during boss encounters. Reactions to the graphics varied: some reviewers praised their artistry, while many others found them low-quality or repetitive. (Note: Attributed to multiple references:) The music met with praise, (Note: Attributed to multiple references:) though Hernandez found it forgettable and Gallegos had little to say. The English dub was widely panned for its poor quality, (Note: Attributed to multiple references:) with some also faulting the wider localization.
