= Izu no Odoriko (1974 film) =

- Film poster
- Directed by: Katsumi Nishikawa
- Written by: Mitsuo Wakasugi
- Produced by: Hori Takeo; Hideo Sasai
- Starring: Momoe Yamaguchi; Tomokazu Miura; Jin Nakayama; Tomomi Sato; Atsuko Ichinomiya
- Cinematography: Kenji Hagiwara
- Edited by: Akira Suzuki
- Music by: Hiroshi Takada
- Distributed by: Toho
- Release date: December 28, 1974 (Japan)
- Running time: 82 minutes
- Country: Japan
- Language: Japanese

Izu no Odoriko (Japanese: 伊豆の踊子; lit. The Dancing Girl of Izu), also known as The Izu Dancer, is a 1974 Japanese romantic drama film. It was directed by Katsumi Nishikawa and starred Momoe Yamaguchi and Tomokazu Miura. This was the first of a series of romantic films starring the couple.

The film is based on the story The Dancing Girl of Izu by Yasunari Kawabata. Nishikawa also directed the original Izu no Odoriko film that was produced in 1963.

== 1974 Cast ==
- Momoe Yamaguchi as Kaoru
- Tomokazu Miura as Kawashima
- Jin Nakayama as Eikichi
- Tomomi Sato as Chiyoko
- Atsuko Ichinomiya as Nobu
- Masami Shiho as Sayuko
- Sayuri Ishikawa as Okimi
- Nami Munakata as Yoshiko
- Yoriko Tanaka as Shino
- Yumiko Arisaki as Otoki
- Nekohachi Edoya III as Toriya
- Koenyū Sanyūtei as Kamiya
- Narrated by Jūkichi Uno

== 1963 Cast ==
- Hideki Takahashi as Kawasaki
- Sayuri Yoshinaga as Kaoru
- Mitsuo Hamada as Student
- Shōbun Inoue Paper seller

== Release ==
The film was released on 28 December 1974 in Japan.

== Reception ==
The film was covered in a special issue of film magazine Kindai Eiga.
