= Furimukeba Ai =

- Theatrical poster
- Directed by: Nobuhiko Obayashi
- Written by: James Miki
- Produced by: Hideo Sasai; Takeo Hori
- Starring: Momoe Yamaguchi; Tomokazu Miura
- Cinematography: Kenji Hagiwara
- Edited by: Jun Nabeshima
- Music by: Naoshi Miyazaki
- Distributed by: Toho
- Release date: July 22, 1978 (Japan)
- Running time: 92 minutes
- Country: Japan
- Language: Japanese

Furimukeba Ai (Japanese: ふりむけば愛), also titled Take Me Away! (Note: The title "Take me away!" appears in the beginning credits of the film itself, before the title "ふりむけば愛" in Japanese script.) is a 1978 Japanese film starring Momoe Yamaguchi and Tomokazu Miura and directed by Nobuhiko Obayashi. It is one of a series of idol films starring the golden combi (golden combination) of seventies idol film stars, Miura and Yamaguchi. It features the first foreign location and the first sex scene of the couple.

== Plot ==
A piano tuner on holiday in San Francisco, Kyoko (Yamaguchi), meets Tetsuo (Miura), a Japanese layabout on the run from his debts in Japan. Kyoko tells Tetsuo she is a pianist who has come to San Francisco to kill herself. After enjoying a night in a bar full of exciting people, they become romantically involved, and she admits she was lying. Kyoko starts living in Tetsuo's apartment but then has to leave. She persuades Tetsuo to come back to Japan in September.

Kyoko comes back to Japan and returns to her job tuning pianos. She is hit by a truck. The driver, Okouchi, apologizes, and offers compensation. But she refuses the offer, saying the accident was her fault. He falls in love with Kyoko, and proposes marriage. However, Kyoko cannot forget Tetsuo. She mails several letters to San Francisco but gets no reply. She later discovers the bar at which he promised to meet her does not exist. She flies to San Francisco, and finds Tetsuo lying in bed. An American woman emerges from the shower topless. Kyoko runs away. Tetsuo runs after her to the airport but she has already left. Tetsuo decides to go to Japan in pursuit of Kyoko.

Back in Japan, Kyoko decides to marry Okouchi. Tetsuo turns up at the door and gets frustrated. Okouchi punches him when he tries to talk to Kyoko on the street. Tetsuo goes to deal with his debts, and ends up in jail. Kyoko and Okouchi get married and go to San Francisco for their honeymoon. Tetsuo's father gets him out of jail and lends Tetsuo his car to chase after Kyoko. Tetsuo intercepts them on the plane to America. He finally gains her attention by singing the song "Furimukeba Ai". Okouchi starts a fight with Tetsuo. Neither man emerges a clear winner but Okouchi decides he has had enough. Kyoko finds Tetsuo at the top of the hill overlooking the Golden Gate Bridge where they first met. Like the first time, Tetsuo is flying a kite; only this time, the kite reads "Kyoko".

== Cast ==
Role	Actor
Tetsuo	Tomokazu Miura
Kyoko	Momoe Yamaguchi
Okouchi	Kohji Moritsugu
