= Momoko Saitō =

Japanese voice actress

- 斎藤 桃子
- Born: June 30, 1982 (age 44); Takarazuka, Hyōgo, Japan
- Occupation: Voice actress
- Years active: 1999–present
- Height: 160 cm (5 ft 3 in)
- Children: 1
- Website: momoko-saito.officialsite.co

Momoko Saitō (斎藤 桃子, Saitō Momoko; born June 30, 1982) is a Japanese voice actress from Takarazuka, Hyōgo. Her major voice roles include Solty Revant in SoltyRei, Perry in Amuri in Star Ocean, Melancholy in Phi Brain: Puzzle of God, Choko in Chocotto Sister, and Nazuna Takanashi in Working!!.

== Filmography ==
=== Anime ===
Year	Series	Role	Notes	Source
2005	Izumo: Takeki Tsurugi no Senki	Byakko		
2005	SoltyRei	Solty Revant		
2006	Binchō-tan	Aloe		
2006	Renkin 3-kyū Magical ? Pokān	Uma		
2006	Mamotte! Lollipop	San Sherard		
2006	Chocotto Sister	Choco		
2006	Hanoka	Yuuri Kaminoza		
2007	Master of Epic: The Animation Age	Waragetcha Green		
2007	Idolmaster Xenoglossia	Mami Futami		
2007	Pururun! Shizuku-chan Aha	Rose		
2008	Amuri in Star Ocean	Perrier La Mer		
2009	The Girl Who Leapt Through Space	Sakura Shishido		
2009	Kupu Mamegoma	Cherry-chan		
2009	Saki	Momoko Touyoko		
2009	Tenchi Muyo! War on Geminar	Maria Nanadan		
2009	A Certain Scientific Railgun	Girl	Ep. 18	
2010–11	Working!!	Nazuna Takanashi	Also second season	
2010	Mitsudomoe	Nipples, Aiko Kuriyama		
2010	Amagami SS	Junichi (young)	Also SS+	
2011	A Channel	Miho	Also OVAs	
2011	The Idolmaster	Tsubame	Ep. 10	
2011	Last Exile: Fam, the Silver Wing	Heine (young)		
2012–14	Phi Brain: Puzzle of God series	Melancholy		
2012	Saki Achiga-hen episode of Side-A	Momoko Toyoko		
2012	Kyōkaisen-jō no Horizon Season 2	Thomas Shakespeare		
2015–21	Mr. Osomatsu	Hatabō		

=== Anime films ===
Year	Series	Role	Notes	Source
2019	Mr. Osomatsu: The Movie	Hatabō		
2022	Mr. Osomatsu: Hipipo-Zoku to Kagayaku Kajitsu	Hatabō		

=== Drama CD ===
Series	Role	Notes	Source
Shinako-i drama CD (しなこいっドラマCD)	Yoshiko Yakumo		
Pavane for a Dead Girl	Maiko C. Suma		
Idolmaster Xenoglossia	Mami Futami		
Mitsudomoe	Aiko Kuriyama, Nipples		
The Girl Who Leapt Through Space	Sakura Shishidou		

=== Video games ===
Year	Series	Role	Notes	Source
	Queen's Blade: Spiral Chaos	Minarai senshi kyuto		
	Pastel Chime Continue (ぱすてるチャイム-continue)	Sachiko Kambara		
	Binchō-tan Shiawase Goyomi	Aloe		
	Parfait Chocolat Second Style (パルフェ Chocolat Second Style)	Mio Sawazaki	Also opening theme	
	Separate Hearts (セパレイトハーツ)	Aoi Futaba (Midori Futaba?)	PS2	
	Yamiyo ni Sasayaku: Detective Kyouichirou Sagara (闇夜にささやく〜探偵 相良恭一郎〜)	Mio Kagemori	PS2	
	Chocolat Maid Cafe Curio (ショコラ -maid cafe "curio")		Opening theme	
