= Momoe Yamaguchi =

Japanese singer and actress

Momoe Yamaguchi 山口 百恵
- Born: 17 January 1959 (age 67); Ebisu, Shibuya, Tokyo, Japan
- Occupations: Singer; actress
- Years active: 1973–1980
- Agent: Horipro
- Spouse: Tomokazu Miura (m. 1980)
- Children: Yutaro Miura; Takahiro Miura
- Musical career
- Genres: Pop; kayōkyoku
- Instrument: Vocals
- Years active: 1973–1980
- Label: CBS Sony

Momoe Miura (Japanese: 三浦 百恵, Hepburn: Miura Momoe; born 17 January 1959), known by her maiden name Momoe Yamaguchi (Japanese: 山口 百恵, Hepburn: Yamaguchi Momoe), is a Japanese former singer, actress, and idol whose career lasted from 1972 to 1980. Often simply referred to by her given name "Momoe", Yamaguchi is one of the most successful singers in Japanese music, releasing 32 singles, including three number one hits, and 21 studio albums. She also starred in 15 feature films and several television serial dramas. At age 21, Yamaguchi retired at the height of her popularity to marry her frequent costar, Tomokazu Miura; she has never performed or made a public appearance since. Therefore, she is called a legendary idol in Japan.

== Biography ==
Momoe Yamaguchi was born on 17 January 1959 at Tokyo Metropolitan Hiroo Hospital in Ebisu, Shibuya, Tokyo.

Not long afterwards she was left in the care of her maternal grandparents. At around four, she returned to her parents and the family then moved to Yokohama. Her father, a medical doctor who was married to another woman with children, was never married to her mother. The family moved once again to Yokosuka. Her mother raised Momoe and her younger sister Toshie by herself. Toshie Yamaguchi studied in the US from partway through high school to college while Momoe made a life in Japan. Momoe has a niece in the US whom she has never met.

== Career ==
Yamaguchi began a career in show business while she was still a student in junior high school. At the end of 1972, at the age of 13, Yamaguchi, along with many of her schoolmates, applied by postcard to appear on the idol talent search television show Star Tanjō!. After a series of successful preliminary auditions, she appeared on the show covering a hit song "Kaiten Mokuba", (Note: 回転木馬, lit. "Merry-go-round") by Yumi Makiba (Note: 牧葉ユミ) earlier that year (itself a cover of "Prima Vera" written by The Ventures). Though she finished second, Yamaguchi received offers from several music producers, and signed with Hori Productions. Her family moved to Tokyo. Yamaguchi transferred to Shinagawa Joshi Gakuin, and then attended Hinode Joshi Gakuin High School, a school which allows its students to carry on careers in show business.

Initially she was promoted together with two other singers, Junko Sakurada and Masako Mori, as the Hana no Chūsan Torio (meaning "The lovely trio of third-year middle school students") since they were all in the third year of middle school (chūsan).

Her first single, "Toshigoro", coupled with her first movie of the same title, did not fare well in the charts, peaking at 37 on the Oricon singles chart. But her second single "Aoi Kajitsu" peaked at number 9. One Japanese pop culture historian, Mark Schilling, has credited its success to its suggestive lyrics. The refrain goes "If that's what you want, I'm okay with anything you do to me; I'm all right with rumors that I'm a bad girl". (Note: あなたが望むなら、私何をされてもいいわ。いけない娘だと噂されてもいい Anata ga nozumu nara, watashi nani o sarete mo ii wa. ikenai musume da to uwasa sarete mo ii.)

Her early songs were written for her by the Hori Productions songwriting team of composer Shunichi Tokura and lyricist Kazuya Senge. One of her biggest hits was her 5th single "Hito Natsu no Keiken" ("One Summer's Experience"), which includes lyrics like "I shall offer you a girl's most precious possession" (Note: あなたに女の子の一番大切なものをあげるわ, Anata ni onna no ko no ichiban taisetsu na mono o ageru wa.) and "We all experience, just once, the sweet snare of seduction". (Note: 誰でも一度だけ経験するのよ 誘惑の甘い罠, Dare demo ichido dake keiken suru no yo, yūwaku no amai wana.) The suggestive lyrics attracted widespread press interest. The young singer was frequently asked salacious questions such as "What do you think a girl's most precious possession is?", to which she replied magokoro ("her devotion").

=== Rising popularity ===
By the end of 1974, her phenomenal popularity was demonstrated by her being invited to be the opening female singer for the 25th Kōhaku Uta Gassen, Japan's most popular musical show, with the song Hito Natsu No Keiken. She would continue to appear in this show every year until her retirement.

But what really launched Momoe to stardom and signaled the second stage of her career were the songs written for her by husband-wife team of lyricist Yoko Agi and composer Ryudo Usaki. These so-called "punk" (tsuppari) songs, including "Yokosuka Story" and "Playback Part 2," proclaimed that Momoe was no longer a girl who could be used by men, but a woman ready to stand on her own two feet and take charge of her own life. Initially Momoe's agency and record company had opposed using this pair, saying that their music didn't fit her image, but she had insisted- and changed her image instead.

— Mark Schilling, An Encyclopedia of Japanese Pop Culture

With her increasing popularity, Yamaguchi gained more control over her career and was able to select her own songwriters. One of her choices was Ryudo Uzaki. She chose him because she liked his song "Secret Love", recorded by the Down Town Boogie Woogie Band. Their first collaboration resulted in the single "Yokosuka Story" in 1976, written by Uzaki with lyrics by his wife, Yoko Aki. Aki was inspired to write the song because both she and Yamaguchi, whom she had never met when the song was originally ordered, had both lived in Yokosuka. "Yokosuka Story" was Yamaguchi's biggest hit, selling more than 600,000 copies, and peaked at number one on the charts. This was the beginning of a collaboration with the husband and wife songwriting team which only ended with Yamaguchi's retirement. Songs were also written for her by writers such as Masashi Sada, who wrote one of her most popular hits, "Cosmos".

Her popularity as a singer was paralleled by rising success in a series of films and television programs. Her second film, Izu no Odoriko, paired her with actor Tomokazu Miura, chosen because he had previously done a commercial for Glico with her. Although Yamaguchi was 15 while Miura was 22, they had great screen chemistry, and became known as the Momoe-Tomokazu "golden combi". (Note: ゴールデン・コンビ) They starred together in a total of 14 of her 17 movies, one every winter and summer.

As she became popular, her father, Kubo, (Note: 久保茂) decided to cash in on her success. He held bogus "press conferences" unauthorized by either Yamaguchi or her management company, and in various ways disrupted her career. Since Yamaguchi was still a minor, he sued for the right of parental authority. (Note: 親権 shinken) The court case ended in a victory for her mother. Yamaguchi declared in her autobiographical book that she ended her relationship with her father, and would never acknowledge his existence again. She also expressed the regret that if she had not become famous, this would not have happened.

By the end of her career, Yamaguchi's music became more sophisticated. Her 12th and 18th albums, Golden Flight and L.A. Blue, were recorded in London and Los Angeles respectively, using local musicians and production staff. Her 21st album, Phoenix Densetsu, was written as a rock opera. Because she wanted to make a rock song before she ended her career, Uzaki and Aki wrote "Rock 'n Roll Widow" for her, which was included on the concept album Moebius's Game.

When her television series were broadcast in China in the 1980s, she also became hugely popular as an actress there. In China she is known as 山口百惠 (the final character is slightly different from that used in Japan), pronounced "Shan Kou Bai Hui". According to a 2000 poll by the "News Station" news magazine programme, she was the Japanese person known most widely among the Chinese.

=== Marriage and retirement ===
With the on-screen romances between Yamaguchi and Tomokazu Miura, an off-screen romance grew. During a trip to Hawaii in early 1979, Miura proposed to Yamaguchi. She accepted, and she also said that she would retire from entertainment to marry him. Yamaguchi announced their relationship at a concert in October 1979, and the announcement about their marriage date and her retirement was made in March 1980. Billboard magazine stated in 1980 that the farewell concert by Momoe Yamaguchi was expected to gross $22.2 million. She performed the farewell concert at the Nippon Budokan on 5 October 1980, released her last album This is my trial on 21 October 1980, and released her last single "Ichie" on 19 November 1980. By the time of her retirement, Yamaguchi was responsible for over 25% of the sales at Horipro. She also wrote the lyrics to this song under the pen name "Kei Yokosuka", and continued to write a few songs for a while after retirement, such as Ann Lewis's La Saison from 1982.

In her autobiographical book, Aoi Toki, she said that she disliked repeatedly singing the same songs. She also stated that she wanted to stop working to devote all her time to the wellbeing of her husband. She also said in an interview at the time of retirement that she did not want to continue working as a singer or an actress.

On 15 October 1980, Yamaguchi officially retired from show business, and on 19 November 1980, the pair were married. Despite several rumors of her comeback, she has devoted herself to being a homemaker and mother to two sons. Her husband, Tomokazu Miura, continued to work as an actor, even though his career up to then had mostly consisted of playing romantic leads in her films and television series.

=== After retirement ===
In the early years after her retirement at the age of twenty, few details of her daily existence as wife of actor Tomokazu Miura were too mundane for the mags' Momoe watchers to miss. Her son's postpartum homecoming, nursery school graduation ceremony, and first day at elementary school rated cover headlines- simply because Mom happened to be in the picture.

— Mark Schilling, An Encyclopedia Of Japanese Pop Culture

In 1981, she wrote a book of autobiographical essays called Aoi Toki, which sold over a million copies in its first month of publication.

Despite her retirement, she is a regular feature in weekly entertainment magazines. Her family suffered considerable difficulty in attending school events due to television crews and photographers, who sometimes used deception to gain access. Fans have frequently been found hanging around her residence, and in at least one case a fan even broke in. In 1999, her husband, Tomokazu Miura, wrote a part-autobiography Hishatai detailing the problems the couple had faced.

Her two sons, Yūtarō and Takahiro Miura, both also entered careers in entertainment. Yūtarō entered the music business under the pseudonym "Yū" in a now-defunct group called "Peaky Salt". Initially it was not known that he was Momoe and Tomokazu's son. Takahiro is an actor who has appeared in several films and television programs. Takahiro is also a qualified lifeguard because he was a swimmer and surf lifesaver from high school and university.

Yamaguchi's hobby is quilt making, and she exhibits her quilts under her married name, "Momoe Miura". In 2011, she was selected in a poll as "The ideal mother".

New musical products continue to go on sale, such as a boxed DVD set of her appearances on television program Yoru no Hit Studio ("Evening Hit Studio") in 2010. In a November 2011 television interview, Ryudo Uzaki said that she still receives a healthy income from record royalties. Her television dramas continue to be available on DVD, and from 2010 have been repeated daily on the TBS Channel cable television station.

In 2011, Tomokazu Miura wrote a book entitled Aishō (compatibility) explaining the secret of their happy marriage. In 2012, the couple came first for the seventh consecutive year in a poll by the Meiji Yasuda life insurance company to find "the ideal celebrity couple" as considered by married people in their 20s to 50s.

== Discography ==
=== Studio albums ===
- Toshigoro (としごろ; 1973)
- Aoi Kajitsu/Kinjirareta Asobi (青い果実／禁じられた遊び; 1973)
- Momoe no Kisetsu (百恵の季節; 1974)
- Hito Natsu no Keiken (ひと夏の経験; 1974)
- 15-sai (15才; 1974)
- 16-sai no Theme (16才のテーマ; 1975)
- Sasayaka na Yokubō (ささやかな欲望; 1975)
- 17-sai no Theme (17才のテーマ; 1976)
- Yokosuka Story (横須賀ストーリー; 1976)
- Pearl Color ni Yurete (パールカラーにゆれて; 1976)
- Momoe Hakusho (百恵白書; 1977)
- Golden Flight (1977)
- Hana Zakari (花ざかり; 1977)
- Cosmos (Uchū) (Cosmos (宇宙); 1978)
- Dramatic (1978)
- Manjushaka (曼珠沙華(マンジューシャカ); 1978)
- A Face in a Vision (1979)
- L.A. Blue (1979)
- Harutsugedori (春告鳥; 1980)
- Möbius's Game (1980)
- Phoenix Densetsu (不死鳥(フェニックス)伝説; 1980)
- This is My Trial (1980)

=== Covers ===
Her songs are regularly covered by other performers. Ayako Fuji released an enka version of her hit Manjushaka in 2003. Cosmos has been covered by many artists, including its creator, Masashi Sada, as well as Akina Nakamori. Imitation Gold was covered by Tak Matsumoto with Mai Kuraki in 2003. In 2004, a tribute album Yamaguchi Momoe Toribyuto Thank You For ... appeared of Yamaguchi covers by singers such as Masaharu Fukuyama, Sowelu, and Hiromi Iwasaki. A second volume, Yamaguchi Momoe Toribyuto Thank You For ... Part 2, with more covers, came out in 2005.

In 1978, Malaysian singer Rina Rahman included "Ku Ingin Bahgia", a Malay version of 赤い運命 (Akai unmei) with Malay lyrics written by Kamali Hudi in her second and final album of the same name. With slightly faster tempo from the Momoe's original version and the attraction of Malays with Japanese melodies back then made "Ku Ingin Bahgia" one of the most popular song to air in the late 70's throughout Malaysia & Singapore and became a household song for Rina Rahman. The track also repeatedly appears in most of Malay 70's themed compilation album until now.

In the 1980s, Chinese-language versions of some of her songs, such as "Manjushaka" (曼珠沙華) as 蔓珠莎華, "Rock'n'Roll Widow" as "冰山大火", "This Is My Trial" as "孤身走我路" were released by Hong Kong singer Anita Mui.

In 1991 The Nolans released an album of songs entitled Playback Part 2, containing well-known Yamaguchi songs with English lyrics. (The lyrics are largely newly written rather than translations of the originals, although some of the English parts of the originals are preserved.) The group re-recorded the songs in the album The Nolans Sing Momoe 2005 to commemorate the 25th anniversary of Yamaguchi's retirement. These albums were released only in Japan.

Rina Rahman covered her song "Akai Unmei" in Malay language, entitled "Ku Ingin Bahagia".

JR West Shinkansen services use two chime version of Iihi Tabidachi as part of their next station alerts. The former Twilight Express used a longer balad version of the song.

== Filmography ==
=== Films ===
Apart from her first film Toshigoro and two concert films, all of Yamaguchi's films, from Izu no odoriko on, were romantic stories costarring Tomokazu Miura. Many of them were directed by Katsumi Nishikawa and were remakes of the director's own films. Except for White Love (set in Spain) and Furimukeba Ai (set in San Francisco), almost all of the romantic films with Miura were based on Japanese literary works.

- Toshigoro (としごろ) (directed by Ichimura)
- Izu no Odoriko (伊豆の踊子) (from the short story "The Dancing Girl of Izu" by Yasunari Kawabata) (directed by Katsumi Nishikawa)
- Shiosai (潮騒) (directed by Katsumi Nishikawa)
- Onēchan Ote Yawaraka ni (お姐ちゃんお手やわらかに) (as herself, her only non-starring role)
- Zesshō (絶唱) (1975) (directed by Katsumi Nishikawa)
- Eden no Umi (エデンの海) (directed by Katsumi Nishikawa)
- Kaze tachinu (風立ちぬ) (directed by Mitsuo Wakasugi)
- Shunkinshō (春琴抄) (directed by Katsumi Nishikawa)
- Doro darake no Junjō (泥だらけの純情) (directed by Sokichi Tomimoto)
- Kiri no Hata (霧の旗), (directed by Katsumi Nishikawa)
- Furimukeba Ai (ふりむけば愛), (directed by Nobuhiko Obayashi), also titled Take me away!
- Honō no Mai (炎の舞) (directed by Yoshisuke Kawasaki)
- White Love (ホワイト・ラブ) (directed by Tsugunobu Kotani)
- Tenshi o Yuwaku (天使を誘惑) (directed by Toshiya Fujita)
- Koto (古都) (1980) (directed by Kon Ichikawa)

==== Concert films ====
- Hana no Kō Ni Torio Hatsukoi Jidai (花の高２トリオ 初恋時代)
- Masako, Junko, Momoe - Namida no Sotsugyōshiki Shuppatsu (昌子・淳子・百恵 – 涙の卒業式 出発)

=== Television ===
On television, most of Yamaguchi's appearances were in a series of dramas with Ken Utsui. Each of these dramas went on for about twenty-six episodes, or half a year. Starting with Kao de waratte and going on to the so-called Akai Series, in each serial drama she and Utsui played a different father and daughter. Echoing Yamaguchi's real-life family issues, all of the Akai series consisted of complex, melodramatic family circumstances such as hidden adoption (Akai Meiro, Akai Giwaku, Akai Kizuna), mistaken identity (Akai Unmei), murder (Akai Meiro, Akai Unmei) or illness (leukemia via radiation poisoning in Akai Giwaku, paralysis via an accidental shooting in Akai Shogeki).

Some of the serial dramas in the Akai series did not feature Yamaguchi, such as Akai Gekiryu starring Yutaka Mizutani, in which she made a guest appearance in the first episode. Each of the Akai series which she appeared in, except Akai Meiro, featured a title song sung by Yamaguchi herself.

The final Akai program, Akai Shisen, was a two-part story starring her and Tomokazu Miura based on Deadline at Dawn, a novel by William Irish whose Japanese title is Akatsuki no shisen (暁の死線). For the first time Ken Utsui appeared in it not as the father of Yamaguchi's character, but instead in a small part as a carjacking victim and pilot. It also featured cameos from Rentarō Mikuni and Gin Maeda who had starred in Akai Unmei.

- Kao de Waratte (顔で笑って)
- Ginga Terebi Shōsetsu Akari no Urumu Koro (銀河テレビ小説 「灯のうるむ頃」) – Three episodes of a long-running NHK series
- Akai Meiro (赤い迷路)
- Akai Giwaku (赤い疑惑) Theme song Arigato, Anata
- Akai Unmei (赤い運命) Theme song Akai Unmei
- Nogiku No Haka (野菊の墓) (1977) based on a story of Itō Sachio
- Akai Shōgeki (赤い衝撃) Theme songs Akai Shogeki and Hashire, Kaze To Tomo Ni
- Akai Kizuna (赤い絆) Theme song Akai Kizuna (Reddo Senseshon) (red sensation)
- Hito wa Sore wo Sukyandaru to Iu (人はそれをスキャンダルという)
- Yamaguchi Momoe Intai Kinen Supesharu Dorama "Akai Shisen" (山口百恵引退記念スペシャルドラマ「赤い死線」)

== See also ==
- Notes on lyrics of "Hito Natsu no Keiken" from Japanese Wikipedia.
- Akai series, from Japanese Wikipedia.
- List of best-selling music artists in Japan
