= Tomokazu Miura =

Japanese actor (born 1952)

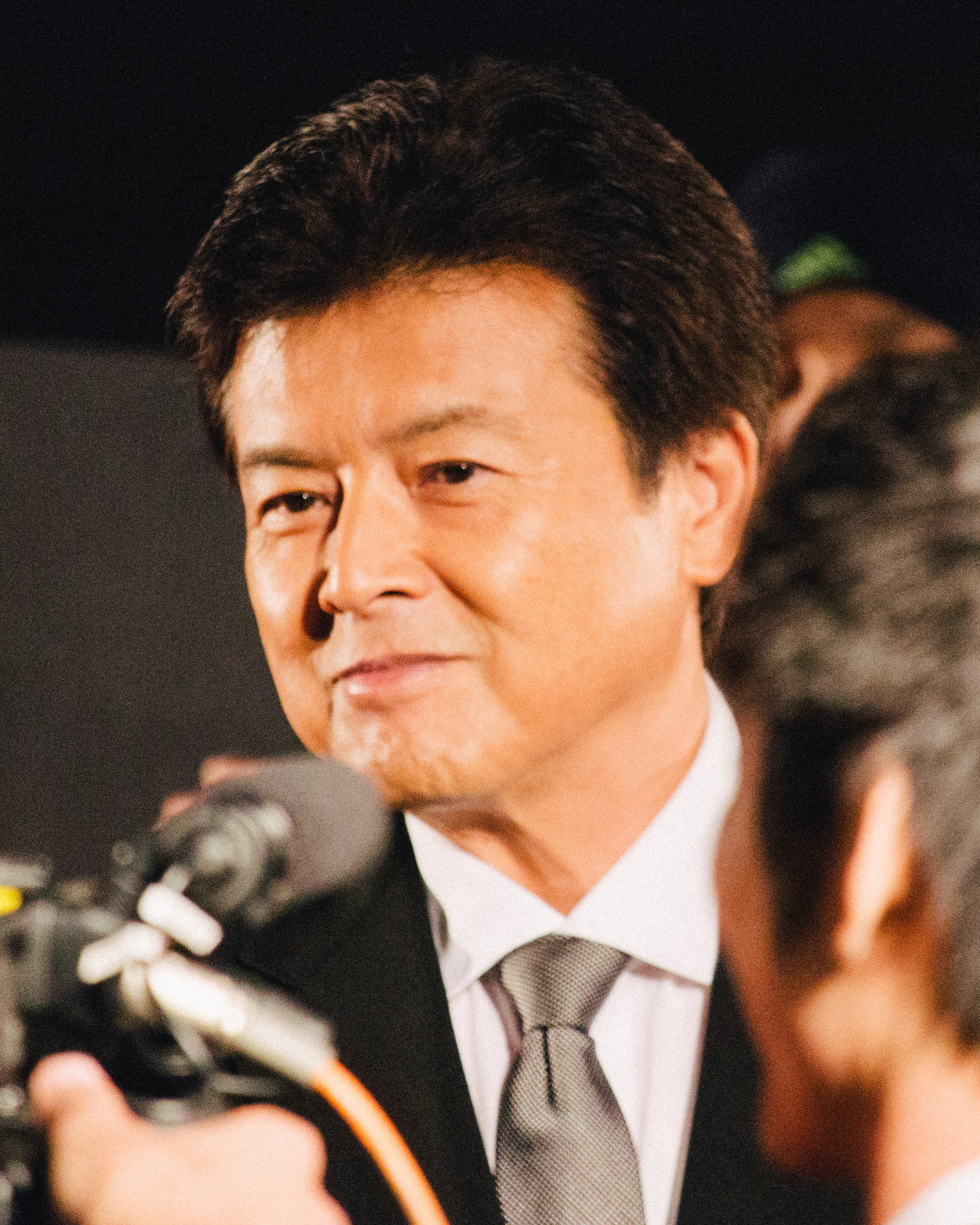
- Miura in 2014
- Born: Minoru Miura; January 28, 1952 (age 74); Enzan, Yamanashi, Japan
- Occupation: Actor
- Years active: 1972–present
- Spouse: Momoe Yamaguchi (m. 1980)
- Children: Yutaro Miura; Takahiro Miura

Tomokazu Miura (三浦 友和, Miura Tomokazu; born Miura Minoru (三浦 稔) on January 28, 1952) is a Japanese actor.

== Life and career ==
Miura attended Hino High School in Tokyo. He was originally a member of rock group RC Succession, but was asked to leave the group by their management when they signed a record contract. However, impressed by his looks, the management company asked him to try out acting. In 1974 he appeared in an advertisement for Glico with young singer Momoe Yamaguchi. When casting the male lead for her film The Izu Dancer, they thought of Miura, and he was chosen as the male lead. The popularity of the Miura/Yamaguchi combination led to them starring together in a series of films and television series. They became known as the "Golden Combi". Although Yamaguchi had a separate career as a singer, this was Miura's main form of employment through the 1970s.

In 1980 Miura and Yamaguchi got married, and the 21-year-old Yamaguchi retired from show business. Initially Miura struggled with his acting career, which had consisted of playing Yamaguchi's romantic partner. However, after a few years of struggle, he was able to establish himself as an actor, changing his type from the "clean cut youth" roles he had played with Yamaguchi to "bad boy" roles. He won the award for best supporting actor at the 10th Hochi Film Award and at the 7th Yokohama Film Festival for Typhoon Club.

Miura is a keen pachinko player and was a smoker until he gave it up at the age of 50. Because of his appearance in cigarette advertisements, it was debated in the Japanese diet whether Miura was an "idol" who could be considered to have a strong influence on underage smoking. Due to his wife's relatively greater fame and popularity, he is sometimes referred to as just "Momoe's husband" (Momoe-chan no Danna-san), a name which he dislikes. The couple has two sons, Yutaro, who went on to marry singer and seiyuu Yui Makino, and Takahiro, and has repeatedly been chosen as "the ideal celebrity couple". According to Miura, they have never had a marital quarrel.

== Filmography ==
=== Film ===
Year	Film	Role	Notes	Ref.
1974	Izu no Odoriko			
1975	The Sound of Waves	Shinji Kubo		
1975	Zesshō	Junkichi Sonoda		
1975	Aoi Sanmyaku			
1976	Autumn Interlude	Tatsuro Yuki		
1976	Shunkinshō	Sasuke		
1977	Sweet Revenge	Keiichi Abe		
1977	House	Auntie's Fiancé		
1978	Furimukeba Ai	Tetsuo	Lead role	
1979	White Love		Lead role	
1980	Koto			
1984	Sayonara Jupiter	Dr. Eiji Honda	Lead role	
1984	Tengoku no Eki: Heavenly Station	Kouichi Hashimoto		
1985	Typhoon Club	Teacher Umemiya		
1986	His Motorbike, Her Island	Hidemasa Sawada		
1990	Tokyo Heaven	Takeo		
1990	Ruten no umi	Mokichi		
1991	Deer Friend	Masao Yagi		
1994	Rampo	Producer Tagawa		
1994	Chonouryoku-sha Michi Eno Tabibito	Hikaru Takatsuka		
1998	Wait and See			
2004	The Taste of Tea	Nobuo Haruno		
2004	Survive Style 5+	Doctor Yamauchi		
2005	Always: Sunset on Third Street	Shiro "Akuma" Takuma		
2007	Adrift in Tokyo	Aiichiro Fukuhara		
2007	Always: Sunset on Third Street 2	Dr. Takuma		
2008	Flowers in the Shadows	Ryōtarō		
2009	Heaven's Door	Hasegawa		
2009	Shizumanu Taiyō	Shiro Gyoten		
2010	Outrage	Kato		
2010	Arrietty	Pod (voice)		
2012	Outrage Beyond	Kato		
2016	64: Part I	Katsutoshi Matsuoka		
2016	64: Part II	Katsutoshi Matsuoka		
2016	The Katsuragi Murder Case	Kiyoshi Katsuragi	Lead role	
2017	Destiny: The Tale of Kamakura	Kōtarō Isshiki		
2018	A Forest of Wool and Steel	Sōichirō Itadori		
2020	AI Amok	Kyōichi Gōda		
2020	Voices in the Wind	Kōhei		
2021	Detective Chinatown 3	Watanabe	Chinese film	
2022	Small, Slow But Steady	Sasaki		
2022	Goodbye Cruel World			
2022	The Lines That Define Me	Kozan Shinoda		
2023	Perfect Days	Tomoyama	Japanese-German film	
2023	The Pearl Legacy	Sentarō		
2025	A Pale View of Hills	Ogata	Japanese-British film	
2026	Guilt	Tatsuro Kuraki		
2027	Boke Biyori	Michio Torikai	Lead role	

=== Television ===
Year	Title	Role	Notes	Ref.
1975–1980	Akai series	Various		
1981	Sekigahara	Ukita Hideie		
1982–1983	Seibu Keisatsu Part II	Gorou Okita	First appeared in Episode 1 of Part II, left after episode 6 of Part III	
1987	Hissatsu Shigotonin V Fuunryūkohen	Kagetaro	Hissatsu series	
1987	Dokuganryu Masamune	Date Shigezane	Taiga drama	
1993	Unmeitōge	Miyamoto Musashi	Television film	
2002	Toshiie and Matsu	Maeda Toshihisa	Taiga drama	
2004	Socrates in Love	Makoto Hirose		
2008	Ryusei no Kizuna	Yasutaka Kashiwabara		
2009	Tokyo Dogs	Otomo Kozo		
2016–2020	Cold Case	Hidetoshi Motoki	3 seasons	
2022	The Black Swindler	Toshio Katsuragi		
2024	Beyond Goodbye	Hiro		
2026	Soul Mate	Tadashi Narutaki		

=== Japanese dub ===
Year	Title	Role	Notes	Ref.
2004	The Incredibles	Mr. Incredible/Robert "Bob" Parr		
2018	Incredibles 2	Mr. Incredible/Robert "Bob" Parr		

== Books ==
- Hishatai (被写体) 1987
- Aisho (相性) 2012

== Honours ==
- Medal with Purple Ribbon (2012)
- Order of the Rising Sun, 4th Class, Gold Rays with Rosette (2023)
