= Sayuri Ishikawa discography =

Sayuri Ishikawa singles discography
- Singles: 117
- Other singles: 8
- Other songs: 3

Sayuri Ishikawa albums discography
- Studio albums: 58
- Live albums: 6
- Compilation albums: 56
- Remix albums: 2
- Box sets: 6
- Theatrical works: 3
- Other appearances: 1

This article is a listing of Sayuri Ishikawa's recordings from her career. Ishikawa has released recordings from Nippon Columbia (1973–1993), Pony Canyon (1993–1999) and Teichiku Records (2000–present).

== Discography ==
=== Singles ===
==== Nippon Columbia singles ====
#	Title	Original title	Lyricist	Composer	Arranger	Release date	Notes
1	"Kakurenbo"	かくれんぼ	Michio Yamagami (山上路夫)	Kosho Inomata (猪俣公章)	Mitsuru Kotani (小谷充)	March 25, 1973	
2	"Aoi Tsukiyo no Sampo Michi"	青い月夜の散歩道	Michio Yamagami (山上路夫)	Kosho Inomata (猪俣公章)	Toshio Kurita (栗田俊夫)	August 10, 1973	
3	"Omoide"	おもいで	Mieko Arima (有馬三恵子)	Minoru Endo (遠藤実)	Tsuneo Saito (斉藤恒夫)	January 10, 1974	
4	"Itsudemo Hatsukoi"	いつでも初恋	Mieko Arima (有馬三恵子)	Minoru Endo (遠藤実)	Tsuneo Saito (斉藤恒夫)	April 1, 1974	
5	"Nakimushi Ressha"	泣き虫列車	Suguru Fuyuno (冬野卓)	Akira Hayashi (林あきら)	Takamichi Ryusaki (竜崎孝路)	June 1, 1974	
6	"Shiroi Tebukuro-Sasa no Fune"	白い手袋・ささの舟	Rei Nakanishi	Keisuke Tsukasa (司啓介)	Masaaki Jimbo (神保正明)	October 1, 1974	
7	"Chiisana Himitsu"	ちいさな秘密	Osamu Yoshioka (吉岡オサム)	Shosuke Ichikawa (市川昭介)	Hiroshi Takada (高田弘)	March 1, 1975	
8	"Anata no Watashi"	あなたの私	Kazuya Senke (千家和也)	Shosuke Ichikawa (市川昭介)	Hiroshi Takada (高田弘)	July 1, 1975	
9	"Aoi Sanmyaku"	青い山脈	Yaso Saijo (西條八十)	Ryoichi Hattori	Ryo Saeki (佐伯亮)	August 10, 1975	Duet with Tetsuya Ushio (潮哲也)
10	"Watashi de Yokereba"	私でよければ	Kazuya Senke (千家和也)	Shosuke Ichikawa (市川昭介)	Hiroshi Takada (高田弘)	October 1, 1975	
11	"Kiri no Wakare"	霧のわかれ	So Nishizawa (西沢爽)	Keisuke Hama (浜圭介)	Jiro Takemura (竹村次郎)	January 1, 1976	
12	"Juku no Junjo"	十九の純情	Yu Aku	Takashi Miki (三木たかし)	Mitsuru Kotani (小谷充)	April 1, 1976	
13	"Ai-ai Gasa"	あいあい傘	Yu Aku	Takashi Miki (三木たかし)	Takashi Miki (三木たかし)	July 1, 1976	
14	"Hana Kuyou"	花供養	Yu Aku	Takashi Miki (三木たかし)	Takashi Miki (三木たかし)	October 1, 1976	
15	"Tsugaru Kaikyo Fuyu-geshiki"	津軽海峡・冬景色	Yu Aku	Takashi Miki (三木たかし)	Takashi Miki (三木たかし)	January 1, 1977	
16	"Noto Hanto"	能登半島	Yu Aku	Takashi Miki (三木たかし)	Takashi Miki (三木たかし)	May 10, 1977	
17	"Danryu"	暖流	Yu Aku	Miki Takashi (三木たかし)	Hiroshi Takada (高田弘)	September 1, 1977	
18	"Jincho-ge"	沈丁花	Ryo Shoji (東海林良)	Katsuo Ono (大野克夫)	Koji Makaino (馬飼野康二)	January 1, 1978	
19	"Suna ni Naritai"	砂になりたい	Yu Aku	Takashi Miki (三木たかし)	Takashi Miki (三木たかし)	April 1, 1978	
20	"Hi no Kuni he"	火の国へ	Yu Aku	Takashi Miki (三木たかし)	Takashi Miki (三木たかし)	July 1, 1978	
21	"Ryu-hyo"	流氷	Yu Aku	Taiji Nakamura (中村泰士)	Hiroshi Takada (高田弘)	November 10, 1978	
22	"Haru Ichirin"	春一輪	Ryo Shoji (東海林良)	Katsuo Ono (大野克夫)	Hiroshi Takada (高田弘)	March 1, 1979	
23	"Inochi Moyashite"	命燃やして	Kazuya Senke (千家和也)	Koji Tokuhisa (徳久広司)	Yukihiko Ito (伊藤幸彦)	June 1, 1979	
24	"Kizu darake no Koi"	傷だらけの恋	Kohan Kawauchi	Jun Kitahara (北原じゅん)	Hiroshi Takada (高田弘)	October 1, 1979	
25	"Anata ni Kaeritai"	あなたに帰りたい	Daizaburo Nakayama (中山大三郎)	Keisuke Hama (浜圭介)	Ryo Baba (馬場良)	February 1, 1980	
26	"Michiyuki Hakata Hatsu"	みちゆき博多発	Yu Aku	Makoto Kawaguchi (川口真)	Makoto Kawaguchi (川口真)	June 1, 1980	
27	"Kamome to Iu Na no Sakaba"	鴎という名の酒場	Yu Aku	Taiji Nakamura (中村泰士)	Osamu Totsuka (戸塚修)	September 1, 1980	
28	"Namida no Yado"	なみだの宿	Takashi Taka (たかたかし)	Jun Suzuki (鈴木淳)	Kensuke Kyo (京建輔)	May 1, 1981	
29	"Amano-gawa Jowa"	天の川情話	Rei Nakanishi	Tetsuya Gen (弦哲也)	Masahito Maruyama (丸山雅仁)	November 25, 1981	
30	"Hototogisu"	ほととぎす	Rei Nakanishi	Takashi Miki (三木たかし)	Takashi Miki (三木たかし)	May 21, 1982	
31	"Isaribi Banka"	漁火挽歌	Miyuki Ishimoto (石本美由紀)	Takashi Miki (三木たかし)	Ryo Saeki (佐伯亮)	July 21, 1982	
32	"Anata no Tame nara"	あなたのためなら	Takashi Taka (たかたかし)	Gendai Kanou (叶弦大)	Ryo Saeki (佐伯亮)	February 1, 1983	
33	"Minato no Shio-goyomi"	港の潮暦	Tetsuro Hoshino (星野哲郎)	Toru Funamura (船村徹)	Masahito Maruyama (丸山雅仁)	June 21, 1983	
34	"Tokyo Kakurembo"	東京かくれんぼ	Rei Nakanishi	Kosho Inomata (猪俣公章)	Tsuneo Saito (斉藤恒夫)	November 21, 1983	
35	"Tokyo Meguri-Ai"	東京めぐり愛	Rei Nakanishi	Shosuke Ichikawa (市川昭介)	Tsuneo Saito (斉藤恒夫)	August 21, 1984	Duet with Koki Kotokaze
36	"Haru no Yuki"	春の雪	Osamu Yoshioka (吉岡治)	Chiaki Oka (岡千秋)	Tsuneo Saito (斉藤恒夫)	February 1, 1985	
37	"Hatoba Shigure"	波止場しぐれ	Osamu Yoshioka (吉岡治)	Chiaki Oka (岡千秋)	Tsuneo Saito (斉藤恒夫)	July 21, 1985	
38	"Futari Gasa"	ふたり傘	Osamu Yoshioka (吉岡治)	Chiaki Oka (岡千秋)	Tsuneo Saito (斉藤恒夫)	July 21, 1985	
39	"Ajisai Banashi"	紫陽花ばなし	Osamu Yoshioka (吉岡治)	Chiaki Oka (岡千秋)	Tsuneo Saito (斉藤恒夫)	July 21, 1985	
40	"Nagori Ame"	なごり雨	Osamu Yoshioka (吉岡治)	Chiaki Oka (岡千秋)	Tsuneo Saito (斉藤恒夫)	July 21, 1985	
41	"Ame Agari"	雨あがり	Osamu Yoshioka (吉岡治)	Chiaki Oka (岡千秋)	Tsuneo Saito (斉藤恒夫)	July 21, 1985	
42	"Osaka Tsubame"	大阪つばめ	Osamu Yoshioka (吉岡治)	Chiaki Oka (岡千秋)	Tsuneo Saito (斉藤恒夫)	February 21, 1986	
43	"Uramachi Meoto-gusa"	裏町夫婦草	Osamu Yoshioka (吉岡治)	Chiaki Oka (岡千秋)	Tsuneo Saito (斉藤恒夫)	February 21, 1986	
44	"Duo Ame Agari"	デュオ雨あがり	Osamu Yoshioka (吉岡治)	Chiaki Oka (岡千秋)	Tsuneo Saito (斉藤恒夫)	February 21, 1986	Duet with Shinichi Kitagawa (北川信一)
45	"Amagi-goe"	天城越え	Osamu Yoshioka (吉岡治)	Tetsuya Gen (弦哲也)	Nobuyuki Sakuraba (桜庭伸幸)	July 21, 1986	
46	"Meoto Zenzai"	夫婦善哉	Osamu Yoshioka (吉岡治)	Tetsuya Gen (弦哲也)	Toshiaki Yamada (山田年秋)	February 1, 1987	
47	"Naniwa Shimai"	浪花姉妹	Takashi Taka (たかたかし)	Chiaki Oka (岡千秋)	Tsuneoo Saito (斉藤恒夫)	October 21, 1987	Duet with Chiyoko Shimakura
48	"Sayonara no Tsubasa"	さよならの翼	Yoko Aki	Tetsuya Gen (弦哲也)	Nobuyuki Sakuraba (桜庭伸幸)	February 10, 1988	
49	"Taki no Shiraito"	滝の白糸	Osamu Yoshioka (吉岡治)	Shosuke Ichikawa (市川昭介)	Tsuneo Saito (斉藤恒夫)	June 10, 1988	
50	"Flower and Green (Hana no Wa Ondo)"	フラワー&グリーン (花の輪音頭)	Tsutomu Mikami (三上務 (+Miyuki Ishimoto 石本美由紀))	Minoru Endo (遠藤実)	Katsuhisa Hattori	November 21, 1988	
51	"Kaze no Bon Koiuta"	風の盆恋歌	Rei Nakanishi	Takashi Miki (三木たかし)	Kei Wakakusa (若草恵)	June 18, 1989	
52	"Umarete Yokatta ne"	生まれてよかったね	Hiromi Kojima (小島ひろ美)	Takashi Miki (三木たかし)	Hiroshi Takada (高田弘)	November 21, 1989	
53	"Koi wa Tenka no Mawarimono"	恋は天下のまわりもの	Rei Nakanishi	Masato Sugimoto (杉本眞人)	Takamichi Ryusaki (竜崎孝路)	April 1, 1990	
54	"Utakata"	うたかた	Osamu Yoshioka (吉岡治)	Chiaki Oka (岡千秋)	Toshiaki Yamada (山田年秋)	September 21, 1990	
55	"Whiskey ga Osuki de sho"	ウイスキーが、お好きでしょ	Shun Taguchi (田口俊)	Masamichi Sugi (杉真理)	Takeshi Saito (斉藤毅)	February 21, 1991	
56	"Echizen Take-mai"	越前竹舞い	Osamu Yoshioka (吉岡治)	Tetsuya Gen (弦哲也)	Kei Wakakusa (若草恵)	March 21, 1991	
57	"Kimi no Na ha"	君の名は	Kazuo Kikuta (菊田一夫)	Yuji Koseki (古関祐而)	Shin'ichirō Ikebe	May 21, 1991	
58	"Koi no Tamenara"	恋のためなら	Rei Nakanishi	Kyohei Tsutsumi (筒美京平)	Kazuo Otani (大谷和夫)	July 21, 1991	
59	"Minato Uta"	港唄	Takashi Taka (たかたかし)	Kosho Inomata (猪俣公章)	Kensuke Kyo (京建輔)	October 21, 1991	
60	"Haru Natsu Aki Aki"	春夏秋秋	Yu Aku	Takashi Miki (三木たかし)	Keiichi Oku (奥慶一)	March 25, 1992	
61	"Hotel Minato-ya"	ホテル港や	Yu Aku	Tetsuya Gen (弦哲也)	Keiichi Oku (奥慶一)	August 21, 1992	
62	"Ai-en Zaka"	合縁坂	Osamu Yoshioka (吉岡治)	Tetsuya Gen (弦哲也)	Toshiaki Yamada (山田年秋)	March 21, 1993	

==== Pony Canyon singles ====
#	Title	Original title	Lyricist	Composer	Arranger	Release date	Notes
63	"Jun Joka"	純・情歌	Kaoru Ito (伊藤薫)	Utsuru Ayame (彩目映)	Hiromoto Tobisawa (飛澤宏元)	October 6, 1993	
64	"Kiga Kaikyo"	飢餓海峡	Osamu Yoshioka (吉岡治)	Tetsuya Gen (弦哲也)	Takashi Miki (三木たかし)	April 21, 1994	
65	"Kokoro no Sake"	心の酒	Kei Ogura (小椋佳)	Kei Ogura (小椋佳)	Eiji Kawamura (川村栄二)	November 2, 1994	
66	"Kita no Nyobo"	北の女房	Osamu Yoshioka (吉岡治)	Chiaki Oka (岡千秋)	Eiji Kawamura (川村栄二)	February 1, 1995	
67	"Osaka no Onna"	大阪のおんな	Osamu Yoshioka (吉岡治)	Chiaki Oka (岡千秋)	Tatsuya Nango (南郷達也)	July 21, 1995	
68	"Umi no Uta"	日本海(うみ)の詩	Kei Ogura (小椋佳)	Ryudo Uzaki (宇崎竜童)	Eiji Kawamura (川村栄二)	November 1, 1995	
69	"Showa Yume Tsubame"	昭和夢つばめ	Toyohisa Araki (荒木とよひさ)	Shosuke Ichikawa (市川昭介)	Eiji Kawamura (川村栄二)	March 21, 1996	
70	"Kita Monogatari"	北ものがたり	Osamu Yoshioka (吉岡治)	Masaharu Kamura (加村まさはる)	Kafu-kafu Doko-shiko (カフカフドコシコ)	November 21, 1996	
71	"Utamaro"	歌麿	Osamu Yoshioka (吉岡治)	Tetsuya Gen (弦哲也)	Kei Wakakusa (若草恵 + Hiromitsu Nishikawa 西川啓光)	March 21, 1997	
72	"Usu Zuki-yo"	薄月夜	Yuki Tsuchida (土田有紀)	Hideo Mizumori (水森英夫)	Toshiaki Maeda (前田俊明)	March 21, 1997	
73	"Ai no Kotoba yori Kuchizuke wo"	愛の言葉よりくちづけを	Tokiko Iwatani (岩谷時子)	Takashi Miki (三木たかし)	Kei Wakakusa (若草恵)	March 21, 1997	
74	"Zansho Koi Kagami"	残照恋鏡	Kei Ogura (小椋佳)	Ryudo Uzaki (宇崎竜童)	Eiji Kawamura (川村栄二)	March 21, 1997	
75	"Ai-koku Cho"	愛告鳥	Yoko Aki (阿木燿子)	Kosetsu Minami (南こうせつ)	Toshiro Imaizumi (今泉敏郎)	March 21, 1997	
76	"Yugao Jowa"	夕顔情話	Toyohisa Araki (荒木とよひさ)	Shosuke Ichikawa (市川昭介)	Tatsuya Nango (南郷達也)	March 21, 1997	
77	"Tampopo"	たんぽぽ	Akiko Shimoji (下地亜記子)	Masataka Kato (加藤将貫)	Tatsuya Nango (南郷達也)	March 21, 1997	
78	"Suki dakara"	好きだから	Kyosuke Kuni (久仁京介)	Hozan Iwagami (岩上峰山)	Tatsuya Nango (南郷達也)	March 21, 1997	
79	"Tabi"	恋路(たび)	Eiji Takino (たきのえいじ)	Gendai Kanou (叶弦大)	Toshiro Imaizumi (今泉敏郎)	March 21, 1997	
80	"Ume ni Uguisu"	梅に鶯	Takashi Taka (たかたかし)	Chiaki Oka (岡千秋)	Tatsuya Nango (南郷達也)	March 21, 1997	
81	"Shuka"	朱夏	Satoshi Tarumi (垂水佐敏)	Katsuo Ono (大野克夫)	Toshiro Imaizumi (今泉敏郎)	June 18, 1997	
82	"Tsuki no Sakazuki"	月の盃	Yu Aku	Takuro Yoshida (吉田拓郎)	Takeshi Yoshida (吉田建)	April 17, 1998	
83	"Nagara no Man-sa"	長良の萬サ	Minesaki Rinjiro (峰崎林二郎)	Mitsuteru Ishida (石田光輝)	Ryo Baba (馬場良)	September 18, 1998	
84	"Showa Meishobu - Honowo no Murayama Minoru Hen"	昭和名勝負-炎の村山実篇	Osamu Yoshioka (吉岡治)	Chiaki Oka (岡千秋)	Motoki Funayama (船山基紀)	April 7, 1999	
85	"Yotte Soro"	酔って候	Osamu Yoshioka (吉岡治)	Masato Sugimoto (杉本眞人)	Akira Miyagawa (宮川涁良)	April 7, 1999	
86	"Ai ga Ichiban"	愛がいちばん	Osamu Yoshioka (吉岡治)	Masato Sugimoto (杉本眞人)	Motoki Funamura (船村基紀)	July 16, 1999	

==== Teichiku singles ====
#	Title	Original title	Lyricist	Composer	Arranger	Release date	Notes
87	"Jinsei Nasake-bune"	人生情け舟	Osamu Yoshioka (吉岡治)	Tetsuya Gen (弦哲也)	Toshiaki Maeda (前田俊明)	September 28, 2000	
88	"Namida Tsuzuri"	涙つづり	Mitsuo Ikeda (池田充男)	Hideo Mizumori (水森英夫)	Ryo Saeki (佐伯亮)	May 1, 2001	
89	"Korogaru Ishi"	転がる石	Yu Aku	Masato Sugimoto (杉本眞人)	Eiji Kawamura (川村栄二)	March 25, 2002	
90	"Yume no Ukihashi"	夢の浮橋	Osamu Yoshioka (吉岡治)	Tetsuya Gen (弦哲也)	Kei Wakakusa (若草恵)	July 24, 2002	
91	"Yu no Hana Kouta"	湯の花KOUTA	Osamu Yoshioka (吉岡治)	Masato Sugimoto (杉本眞人)	Tatsumi Yano (矢野立美)	February 21, 2003	
92	"Hidamari no Uta"	陽だまりの詩	Osamu Yoshioka (吉岡治)	Yu Hijirikawa (聖川湧)	Tatsuya Nango (南郷達也)	April 23, 2003	
93	"Ningen Moyo"	人間模様	Yu Aku	Masato Sugimoto (杉本眞人)	Eiji Kawamura (川村栄二)	September 25, 2003	
94	"Hoshi no Tabibito"	星の旅びと	Hiroyuki Itsuki (五木寛之)	Kohei Miyuki (幸耕平)	Koji Ryusaki (竜崎孝路)	April 21, 2004	
95	"Ichiyo Koiuta"	一葉恋歌	Osamu Yoshioka (吉岡治)	Tetsuya Gen (弦哲也)	Kei Wakakusa (若草恵)	September 23, 2004	
96	"Aki no Märchen"	秋のメルヘン	Osamu Yoshioka (吉岡治)	Katsuo Ono (大野克夫)	Mitsuo Hagita (萩田光雄)	May 25, 2005	
97	"Izaka-ya 'Hana Ichimonme'"	居酒屋『花いちもんめ』	Osamu Yoshioka (吉岡治)	Chiaki Oka (岡千秋)	Masakane Tsuta (蔦将包)	October 26, 2005	
98	"Uta, Kono Fushigi na Mono"	歌、この不思議なもの	Rei Nakanishi	Reijiro Koroku (小六禮次郎)	Kei Wakakusa (若草恵)	May 4, 2006	
99	"Kamome no Nyobo"	かもめの女房	Osamu Yoshioka (吉岡治)	Keisuke Hama (浜圭介)	Kei Wakakusa (若草恵)	September 6, 2006	
100	"Sagiri no Yado"	狭霧の宿	Osamu Yoshioka (吉岡治)	Chiaki Oka (岡千秋)	Tatsuya Nango (南郷達也)	March 25, 2007	
101	"Asabana"	朝花	Ryoichi Higuchi (樋口了一)	Ryoichi Higuchi (樋口了一)	Toshiyuki Mori (森俊之)	September 5, 2007	
102	"Higo no Bonuta - Homura"	肥後の盆唄～炎(ほむら)～	Hiroo Takada (高田ひろお)	Takashi Miki (三木たかし)	Kei Wakakusa (若草恵)	April 14, 2008	
103	"Choito..."	ちょいと...	Fumiko Okada (岡田冨美子)	Kisaburo Suzuki (鈴木キサブロー)	Shinji Miyazaki	October 22, 2008	
104	"Horeta ga Waruika"	惚れたが悪いか	Shinichi Ishihara (石原信一)	Chiaki Oka (岡千秋)	Eiji Kawamura (川村栄二)	March 25, 2009	
105	"Sakura-yo"	桜夜	Masashi Sada	Takashi Miki (三木たかし)	Keiichi Oku (奥慶一)	August 19, 2009	
106	"Daikon no Hana"	だいこんの花	Osamu Yoshioka (吉岡治)	Chiaki Oka (岡千秋)	Tatsuya Nango (南郷達也)	March 24, 2010	
107	"Baby Baby"	Baby Baby	Tamio Okuda	Tamio Okuda		October 20, 2010	
108	"Ten no Yugao"	天の夕顔	Rei Nakanishi	Keisuke Hama (浜圭介)	Kei Wakakusa (若草恵)	January 19, 2011	
109	"Midori no Furusato"	緑のふるさと	Rei Nakanishi	Keisuke Hama (浜圭介)	Kei Wakakusa (若草恵)	July 20, 2011	
110	"Hama-uta"	浜唄	Rei Nakanishi	Tetsuya Gen (弦哲也)	Eiji Kawamura (川村栄二)	March 25, 2012	
111	"Umare Kawaru yorimo"	生まれ変わるよりも	Kazufumi Miyazawa	Kazufumi Miyazawa	Shun Fukui (福井峻)	September 5, 2012	
112	"Meoto Zanmai"	夫婦三昧	Osamu Yoshioka (吉岡治)	Tetsuya Gen (弦哲也)	Toshiaki Yamada (山田年秋)	February 20, 2013	
113	"Ai yo Shizuka ni Nemure"	愛よ静かに眠れ	Toyohisa Araki (荒木とよひさ)	Takashi Tsushimi (都志見隆)	Eiji Kawamura (川村栄二)	August 21, 2013	Duet with Kiyoshi Maekawa
114	"Shiran no Hana"	紫蘭の花	Makoto Kitajo (喜多條忠)	Yoshihiro Sakikubo (崎久保吉啓)	Kei Wakakusa (若草恵)	September 4, 2013	
115	"Anya no Shinju Date"	暗夜の心中立て	Ringo Sheena (椎名林檎)	Ringo Sheena (椎名林檎)	Neko Saito (斎藤ネコ)	April 2, 2014	
116	"Aa... Anta Kawa"	あぁ・・・あんた川	Yoshi Ikuzo (吉幾三)	Yoshi Ikuzo (吉幾三)	Nangō Tatsuya (南郷達也)	January 21, 2015	
117	"Chanto Iwanakya Aisanai"	ちゃんと言わなきゃ愛さない	Tsunku (つんく♂)	Yuji Ohno (大野雄二)	Yuji Ohno (大野雄二)	October 21, 2015	Used as the ending theme for the anime Lupin the Third Part 4

==== Other singles ====
#	Title	Original title	Lyricist	Composer	Arranger	Release date	Notes
1	"Yuzuri-ai"	ゆずりあい	Konosuke Fuji (藤公之介)	Toshiaki Arai (新井利昌)	Jiro Takemura (竹村次郎)	April 1977	
2	"Shoji-ko Bojo"	精進湖慕情	Katsuyoshi Watanabe (渡辺勝美)	Shozo Ichinose (一瀬正造)	Takaharu Ikeda (池多孝春)	July 1981	
3	"Yagiri no Watashi"	矢切の渡し	Miyuki Ishimoto (石本美由紀)	Toru Funamura (船村徹)	Hiroshi Takada (高田弘)	July 1983	Duet with Koki Kotokaze
4	"Tokyo Meguri-Ai"	東京めぐり愛	Rei Nakanishi	Shosuke Ichikawa (市川昭介)	Tsuneo Saito (斉藤恒夫)	August 1984	Duet with Koki Kotokaze
5	"Tokyo Wakare Michi - Tokyo no Sora Aru Kagiri"	東京わかれみち～東京の空あるかぎり	Rei Nakanishi	Takashi Miki (三木たかし)	Takamichi Ryusaki (竜崎孝路)	February 1985	Duet with Koki Kotokaze
6	"Ai no Wa Ondo"	愛の輪音頭	Kazuo Izumi (いずみかずお (+ Tokiko Iwatani))	Minoru Endo	Kensuke Kyo	1985	
7	"Ne no Uta"	根の歌	Yoshinobu Yokoo (横尾嘉信)	Yoshinobu Yokoo (横尾嘉信)	Hiromi Yutenji (祐天寺浩美)	October 2010	As a member of Chorus Japan
8	"Akatsuki Zukuyo"	暁月夜～あかつきづくよ～	Kazufumi Miyazawa	Kazufumi Miyazawa	Masaki Tsuragi (鶴来正基)	March 2011	Duet with Kazufumi Miyazawa

==== Other songs ====
#	Title	Original title	Lyricist	Composer	Arranger	Release date	Notes
1	"Koko wa Minami no Shima"	ここは南の島	Ryu Maeshiro (真栄城龍)	Tsuneo Fukuhara (普久原恒勇)	Minoru Kato (香登みのる)		Jointly with Will Be's (ウィルビーズ)
2	"Hirose-gawa Bojo"	広瀬川慕情	Keiko Mikami (みかみけいこ)	Kosho Inomata (猪俣公章)			
3	"Mo-o Ii-kai"	もういいかい	Osamu Yoshioka (吉岡治)	Natsumi Hirai (平井夏美)	Michiru 未知留(みちる)		

=== Albums ===
==== Studio albums ====
#	Title	Original title	Release date	Label
1	Debut Album	デビューアルバム	August 25, 1973	Nippon Columbia
2	Omoide / Aoi Sanmyaku	おもいで/青い山脈	April 1, 1974	Nippon Columbia
3	Chiisana Himitsu	ちいさな秘密	April 25, 1975	Nippon Columbia
4	Anata no Watashi	あなたの私	September 1, 1975	Nippon Columbia
5	Kiri no Wakare	霧のわかれ	February 25, 1976	Nippon Columbia
6	Ai-ai Gasa	あいあい傘	July 25, 1976	Nippon Columbia
7	Hana Kuyou –Sanbyaku Rokuju Go Nichi Koi Moyou	花供養（365日恋もよう）	November 25, 1976	Nippon Columbia
8	Noto Hanto	能登半島	June 25, 1977	Nippon Columbia
9	Jincho-ge	沈丁花	February 25, 1978	Nippon Columbia
10	Enka Itchokusen	演歌一直線	May 25, 1978	Nippon Columbia
11	Hi no Kuni he / Suna ni Naritai	火の国へ/砂になりたい	July 25, 1978	Nippon Columbia
12	Kage wo Shitaite -Fumetsu no Koga Melody-	影を慕いて～不滅の古賀メロディー	November 25, 1978	Nippon Columbia
13	Haru Ichirin	春一輪	March 25, 1979	Nippon Columbia
14	Inochi Moyashite	命燃やして	July 25, 1979	Nippon Columbia
15	Anata ni Kaeritai	あなたに帰りたい	February 25, 1980	Nippon Columbia
16	Hiren Moyou	悲恋もよう	September 1, 1980	Nippon Columbia
17	Haru Hitotsu -Nippon no Onna-	春ひとつ～日本の女～	February 25, 1981	Nippon Columbia
18	Oku no Hosomichi wo Yuku -Sayuri Kiko-	奥の細道をゆく～さゆり紀行～	October 25, 1981	Nippon Columbia
19	Sayuri Banka	さゆり挽歌	August 21, 1982	Nippon Columbia
20	Nijyu-go Sai Watashi	二十五歳わたし	January 21, 1983	Nippon Columbia
21	Sayuri no Shio-goyomi	さゆりの潮暦	October 21, 1983	Nippon Columbia
22	Tokyo Meguri-Ai	東京めぐり愛	December 21, 1984	Nippon Columbia
23	Hatoba Shigure -Ame ni Saku Hana Monogatari	波止場しぐれ～雨に咲く花物語～	August 21, 1985	Nippon Columbia
24	Osaka Tsubame '86 Yusen Hits	大阪つばめ'86有線ヒット	May 21, 1986	Nippon Columbia
25	Amagi-goe	天城越え	September 21, 1986	Nippon Columbia
26	Meoto Zenzai -Meoto Enka Meikyoku-shu	夫婦善哉～夫婦演歌名曲集～	April 1, 1987	Nippon Columbia
27	Sayonara no Tsubasa	さよならの翼	March 21, 1986	Nippon Columbia
28	Warashi -Nippon Doyo Shoka Shu - Sayuri Ishikawa in Los Angeles	童～日本童謡唱歌集～石川さゆり IN LOS ANGELES	July 21, 1988	Nippon Columbia
29	Tokusen-shu Sayuri Ishikawa / Taki no Shiraito	特選集 石川さゆり/滝の白糸	May 21, 1989	Nippon Columbia
30	Kaze no Bon Koiuta	風の盆恋歌	June 24, 1989	Nippon Columbia
31	Tokusen-shu Sayuri Ishikawa / Koi wa Tenka no Mawarimono	特選集 石川さゆり/恋は天下のまわりもの	May 21, 1990	Nippon Columbia
32	Koi Meguru Kisetsu ni...	恋めぐる季節に・・・	September 21, 1990	Nippon Columbia
33	Tokusen-shu Sayuri Ishikawa / Echizen Take-mai	特選集 石川さゆり/越前竹舞い	June 21, 1991	Nippon Columbia
34	You & Night & Whisky -Whisky ga Osuki Desho	You & Night & Whisky～ウィスキーが、お好きでしょ～	July 21, 1991	Nippon Columbia
35	Nijisseiki no Meikyoku Tachi (Vol. 1)	二十世紀の名曲たち第1集	November 21, 1991	Nippon Columbia
36	Tokusen-shu Sayuri Ishikawa / Haru Natsu Aki Aki	特選集 石川さゆり/春夏秋秋	May 21, 1992	Nippon Columbia
37	Heisei Ukiyoe Banashi	平成浮世絵ばなし	August 21, 1992	Nippon Columbia
38	Nijisseiki no Meikyoku Tachi (Vol. 2)	二十世紀の名曲たち第2集	November 21, 1992	Nippon Columbia
39	Sayuri Ishikawa Tokusen-shu -Ai San-san	石川さゆり特選集 『愛燦燦』	November 3, 1993	Pony Canyon
40	Nijisseiki no Meikyoku Tachi (Vol. 3)	二十世紀の名曲たち第3集	December 17, 1993	Pony Canyon
41	Nijisseiki no Meikyoku Tachi (Vol. 4)	二十世紀の名曲たち第4集	October 21, 1994	Pony Canyon
42	Sayuri Ishikawa Tokusen-shu -Kiga Kaikyo / Hana no Waltz	石川さゆり特選集 飢餓海峡/花のワルツ	December 7, 1994	Pony Canyon
43	Utabito	うたびと	June 21, 1995	Pony Canyon
44	Nijisseiki no Meikyoku Tachi (Vol. 5)	二十世紀の名曲たち第5集	October 20, 1995	Pony Canyon
45	Sayuri Ishikawa Tokusen-shu Osaka no Onna / Sake Jin-jin	石川さゆり特選集 大阪の女/酒尽尽	December 16, 1995	Pony Canyon
46	Showa Yume Tsubamae -Anata ga Eranda Sukina Uta-	昭和夢つばめ～あなたが選んだ好きな唄～	August 21, 1996	Pony Canyon
47	Nijisseiki no Meikyoku Tachi (Vol. 6)	二十世紀の名曲たち第6集	October 18, 1996	Pony Canyon
48	Sayuri Ishikawa Tokusen-shu Showa Yume Tsubame / Naruto Kaikyo	石川さゆり特選集 昭和夢つばめ/鳴門海峡	December 4, 1996	Pony Canyon
49	Nijisseiki no Meikyoku Tachi (Vol. 7)	二十世紀の名曲たち第7集	October 17, 1997	Pony Canyon
50	Nijisseiki no Meikyoku Tachi (Vol. 8)	二十世紀の名曲たち第8集	October 21, 1998	Pony Canyon
51	Nijisseiki no Meikyoku Tachi (Vol. 9)	二十世紀の名曲たち第9集	October 20, 1999	Pony Canyon
52	Nijisseiki no Meikyoku Tachi (Vol. 10)	二十世紀の名曲たち第10集	December 20, 2000	Teichiku
53	Sayuri	さゆり	March 25, 2002	Teichiku
54	Sayuri II -Jikkyoku Toiro	さゆり II～十曲十色～	October 21, 2004	Teichiku
55	Sayuri III	さゆりIII	May 23, 2007	Teichiku
56	Sayuri IV	さゆりIV	May 20, 2009	Teichiku
57	X -Cross-	X -Cross-	September 19, 2012	Teichiku
58	X -Cross II-	X -Cross II-	April 23, 2014	Teichiku

==== Live albums ====
#	Title	Original title	Release date	Label
1	Sayuri Ishikawa Show -Hana Hiraku Jyu-hassai	石川さゆりショー～花ひらく18才	May 25, 1976	Nippon Columbia
2	Sayuri Ishikawa Show -Moeru Sayuri Enka	石川さゆりショー～燃えるさゆり演歌～	January 25, 1977	Nippon Columbia
3	Nessho!! Sayuri Ishikawa -Debut Go-shunen Kinen Recital	熱唱！！石川さゆり～デビュー五周年記念リサイタル～	December 25, 1977	Nippon Columbia
4	Akai Rosoku to Ningyo / Sayuri Natsu ni Utau	赤いろうそくと人魚/さゆり夏に歌う	October 10, 1979	Nippon Columbia
5	Uta kara Uta he	歌から詩へ	March 21, 1983	Nippon Columbia
6	Sayuri Ishikawa 15th Anniversary Recital -NHK Hall Live-	石川さゆり15周年リサイタル～NHKホールライブ～	November 21, 1987	Nippon Columbia

==== Compilation albums ====
#	Title	Original title	Release date	Label
1	Ishikawa Sayuri Best Album	石川さゆりベストアルバム	November 25, 1974	Nippon Columbia
2	Golden Star Wide Delux	ゴールデン・スター・ワイド・デラックス	November 25, 1975	Nippon Columbia
3	Golden Star Delux Sayuri Ishikawa no Subete	ゴールデン・スター・デラックス 石川さゆりのすべて	October 25, 1976	Nippon Columbia
4	Danryu / Sayuri Ishikawa Best 14	暖流/石川さゆり ベスト14	September 25, 1977	Nippon Columbia
5	Best Hit Sayuri Ishikawa	ベスト・ヒット 石川さゆり	November 25, 1979	Nippon Columbia
6	Ryojo Enka no Subete	旅情演歌のすべて	April 25, 1980	Nippon Columbia
7	Sayuri Ishikawa Best Album	石川さゆりベスト・アルバム	June 25, 1981	Nippon Columbia
8	Sayuri Ishikawa Best (Isaribi Banka)	石川さゆりベスト（漁火挽歌）	November 21, 1982	Nippon Columbia
9	Sayuri Ishikawa Zenkyoku-shu / Minato no Shio-goyomi	石川さゆり全曲集/港の潮暦	November 21, 1983	Nippon Columbia
10	Sayuri Ishikawa Best	石川さゆりベスト	May 21, 1984	Nippon Columbia
11	Tokusen-shu Sayuri Ishikawa / Tokyo Kakurembo	特選集 石川さゆり/東京かくれんぼ	June 21, 1984	Nippon Columbia
12	Sayuri Ishikawa Zenkyoku-shu / Tokyo Meguri-Ai	石川さゆり全曲集/東京めぐり愛	November 21, 1984	Nippon Columbia
13	Tokusen-shu Sayuri Ishikawa / Haru no Yuki	特選集 石川さゆり/春の雪	April 21, 1985	Nippon Columbia
14	Sayuri Ishikawa Best / Hatoba Shigure	石川さゆりベスト/波止場しぐれ	September 21, 1985	Nippon Columbia
15	Sayuri Ishikawa Zenkyoku-shu / Hatoba Shigure	石川さゆり全曲集/波止場しぐれ	October 21, 1985	Nippon Columbia
16	Osaka Tsubame	大阪つばめ	February 21, 1986	Nippon Columbia
17	Sayuri Ishikawa Zenkyoku-shu / Osaka Tsubame	石川さゆり全曲集/大阪つばめ	May 21, 1986	Nippon Columbia
18	Tokusen-shu Sayuri Ishikawa / Osaka Tsubame	特選集/大阪つばめ	May 21, 1986	Nippon Columbia
19	Sayuri Ishikawa Zenkyoku-shu / Amagi-goe	石川さゆり全曲集/天城越え	October 21, 1986	Nippon Columbia
20	Tokusen-shu Sayuri Ishikawa / Meoto Zenzai	特選集 石川さゆり/夫婦善哉	April 21, 1987	Nippon Columbia
21	Sayuri Ishikawa Zenkyoku-shu / Meoto Zenzai	石川さゆり全曲集/夫婦善哉	October 21, 1987	Nippon Columbia
22	Tokusen-shu Sayuri Ishikawa / Sayonara no Tsubasa	特選集 石川さゆり/さよならの翼	April 21, 1988	Nippon Columbia
23	Sayuri Ishikawa Zenkyoku-shu / Taki no Shiraito	石川さゆり全曲集/滝の白糸	October 21, 1988	Nippon Columbia
24	CD Twin Sayuri Ishikawa Hit Kyokushu	CDツイン 石川さゆりヒット曲集	December 1, 1988	Nippon Columbia
25	Sayuri Ishikawa Best 14	石川さゆりベスト14	February 1, 1989	Nippon Columbia
26	Sayuri Ishikawa Zenkyoku-shu / Kaze no Bon Koiuta	石川さゆり全曲集/風の盆恋歌	October 21, 1989	Nippon Columbia
27	Super Twin / Kaze no Bon Koiuta	スーパーツイン/風の盆恋歌	December 10, 1989	Nippon Columbia
28	Sayuri Ishikawa Zenkyoku-shu / Utakata	石川さゆり全曲集/うたかた	November 21, 1990	Nippon Columbia
29	Super Twin Delux Sayuri Ishikawa Zenkyoku-shu / Utakata	スーパー・ツイン・デラックス 石川さゆり/うたかた	December 1, 1990	Nippon Columbia
30	Sayuri Ishikawa Zenkyoku-shu / Minato Uta	石川さゆり全曲集/港唄	November 21, 1991	Nippon Columbia
31	Sayuri Ishikawa Zenkyoku-shu / Hotel Minato-ya	石川さゆり全曲集/ホテル港や	October 21, 1992	Nippon Columbia
32	Sayuri Ishikawa Zenkyoku-shu (Vol. 1) -Tsugaru Kaikyo Fuyu-geshiki	石川さゆり全曲集第1集『津軽海峡・冬景色』	October 21, 1993	Pony Canyon
33	Sayuri Ishikawa Zenkyoku-shu (Vol. 2) -Amagi-goe	石川さゆり全曲集第2集『天城越え』	October 21, 1993	Pony Canyon
34	Warashi	童～わらし～	November 3, 1993	Pony Canyon
35	Sayuri Ishikawa Super Best	石川さゆりスーパーベスト	November 19, 1993	Pony Canyon
36	Sayuri Ishikawa Best / Osaka no Onna	石川さゆりベスト/大阪の女	December 6, 1995	Pony Canyon
37	Sayuri Ishikawa 2001 Nen Zenkyoku-shu	石川さゆりベスト2001年全曲集	November 22, 2000	Teichiku
38	Sayuri Ishikawa 2002 Nen Zenkyoku-shu	石川さゆりベスト2002年全曲集	December 5, 2001	Teichiku
39	Sayuri Ishikawa 2003 Nen Zenkyoku-shu	石川さゆりベスト2003年全曲集	March 26, 2003	Teichiku
40	Sayuri Ishikawa 2004 Nen Zenkyoku-shu	石川さゆりベスト2004年全曲集	November 21, 2003	Teichiku
41	Sayuri Ishikawa 2005 Nen Zenkyoku-shu	石川さゆりベスト2005年全曲集	November 24, 2004	Teichiku
42	Sayuri Ishikawa 2006 Nen Zenkyoku-shu	石川さゆりベスト2006年全曲集	October 26, 2005	Teichiku
43	Sayuri Ishikawa Dai-Zenshu	石川さゆり大全集	November 23, 2005	Teichiku
44	Sayuri Ishikawa 2007 Nen Zenkyoku-shu	石川さゆりベスト2007年全曲集	October 25, 2006	Teichiku
45	Sayuri Ishikawa 2008 Nen Zenkyoku-shu	石川さゆりベスト2008年全曲集	November 21, 2007	Teichiku
46	Sayuri Ishikawa Jidai no Iki wo Utau	石川さゆり時代の粋を唄う	June 25, 2008	Teichiku
47	Sayuri Ishikawa 2009 Nen Zenkyoku-shu	石川さゆりベスト2009年全曲集	November 26, 2008	Teichiku
48	Sayuri Ishikawa 2010 Nen Zenkyoku-shu	石川さゆりベスト2010年全曲集	December 16, 2009	Teichiku
49	Sayuri Ishikawa Dai-Zenshu	石川さゆり大全集	January 20, 2010	Teichiku
50	Sayuri Ishikawa Osamu Yoshioka wo Utau	石川さゆり 吉岡治を歌う	July 7, 2010	Teichiku
51	Sayuri Ishikawa 2011 Nen Zenkyoku-shu	石川さゆりベスト2011年全曲集	November 24, 2010	Teichiku
52	Sayuri Ishikawa Early Songs Collection	石川さゆり アーリーソング コレクション	December 1, 2010	Nippon Columbia
53	Sayuri Ishikawa 2012 Nen Zenkyoku-shu	石川さゆりベスト2012年全曲集	November 23, 2011	Teichiku
54	Sayuri Ishikawa X Rei Nakanishi Sakuhin-shu	石川さゆり×なかにし礼作品集	June 20, 2012	Teichiku
55	Sayuri Ishikawa 2013 Nen Zenkyoku-shu	石川さゆりベスト2013年全曲集	March 20, 2013	Teichiku
56	Sayuri Ishikawa 2014 Nen Zenkyoku-shu	石川さゆりベスト2014年全曲集	October 23, 2013	Teichiku

==== Remix albums ====
#	Title	Original title	Release date	Label
1	Shunka	春夏～しゅんか～	March 17, 1999	Pony Canyon
2	Shuto	秋冬～しゅうとう～	March 17, 1999	Pony Canyon

==== Box sets ====
#	Title	Original title	Release date	Label
1	Sayuri Ishikawa Dai-Zenshu	歌手生活15周年記念 石川さゆり大全集	October 1, 1987	Nippon Columbia
2	Michi -Sayuri Ishikawa Dai-Zenshu	歌手生活20周年記念『道』石川さゆり大全集	March 21, 1992	Nippon Columbia
3	Gyo -Sayuri Ishikawa Dai-Zenshu	石川さゆり25周年記念大全集『行』	March 18, 1998	Pony Canyon
4	Toki -Sayuri Ishikawa Dai-Zenshu	石川さゆり大全集『とき』	September 26, 2002	Teichiku
5	Nijisseiki no Meikyoku Tachi	二十世紀の名曲たち	November 5, 2007	Teichiku
6	Uta	歌	March 14, 2012	Teichiku

==== Recordings of theatrical works ====
#	Title	Original title	Release date	Label
1	Ima Taketori Monogatari -Hikaru Tonde Yuku	今竹取物語～ヒカル翔んで行く	October 25, 1978	Nippon Columbia
2	Akai Rosoku to Ningyo / Sayuri Natsu ni Utau	赤いろうそくと人魚/さゆり夏に歌う	October 10, 1979	Nippon Columbia
3	Uta Shibai	歌芝居	October 24, 2007	Teichiku

==== Other appearances ====
#	Title	Original title	Release date	Label
1	Teichiku Hour -Ichi-go Ichi-e	テイチクアワー『一五一会』	January 1, 2004	Teichiku
