= 1973 in Japanese music =

In 1973 (Shōwa 48), Japanese music was released on records and performed in concerts, and there were charts, awards, contests and festivals.

== Awards, contests and festivals ==
The 16th Osaka International Festival (Japanese: 大阪国際フェスティバル) was held from 10 April to 28 April 1973. The 2nd Tokyo Music Festival was held on 29 April 1973. The 5th Yamaha Popular Song Contest was held on 20 May 1973. The 6th Yamaha Popular Song Contest was held on 13 October 1973. The final of the 4th World Popular Song Festival was held on 18 November 1973. The 15th Japan Record Awards were held on 31 December 1973. The 24th NHK Kōhaku Uta Gassen was held on 31 December 1973.

The 22nd Otaka prize was won by Minao Shibata.

== Number one singles ==
Oricon

The following reached number 1 on the weekly Oricon Singles Chart:

Issue date	Song	Artist(s)
1 January	"Onna no Michi"	Shiro Miya & Pinkara Trio
8 January	"Onna no Michi"	Shiro Miya & Pinkara Trio
15 January	"Onna no Michi"	Shiro Miya & Pinkara Trio
22 January	"Onna no Michi"	Shiro Miya & Pinkara Trio
29 January	"Onna no Michi"	Shiro Miya & Pinkara Trio
5 February	"Onna no Michi"	Shiro Miya & Pinkara Trio
12 February	"Onna no Michi"	Shiro Miya & Pinkara Trio
19 February	"Gakuseigai no Kissaten"	Garo
26 February	"Gakuseigai no Kissaten"	Garo
5 March	"Gakuseigai no Kissaten"	Garo
12 March	"Gakuseigai no Kissaten"	Garo
19 March	"Gakuseigai no Kissaten"	Garo
26 March	"Gakuseigai no Kissaten"	Garo
2 April	"Gakuseigai no Kissaten"	Garo
9 April	"Wakaba no Sasayaki"	Mari Amachi
16 April	"Wakaba no Sasayaki"	Mari Amachi
23 April	"Wakaba no Sasayaki"	Mari Amachi
30 April	"Wakaba no Sasayaki"	Mari Amachi
7 May	"Wakaba no Sasayaki"	Mari Amachi
14 May	"Akai Fūsen"	Miyoko Asada
21 May	"Akai Fūsen"	Miyoko Asada
28 May	"Akai Fūsen"	Miyoko Asada
4 June	"Akai Fūsen"	Miyoko Asada
11 June	"Akai Fūsen"	Miyoko Asada
18 June	"Kiken na Futari"	Kenji Sawada
25 June	"Kimi no Tanjōbi"	Garo
2 July	"Kiken na Futari"	Kenji Sawada
9 July	"Kiken na Futari"	Kenji Sawada
16 July	"Koisuru Natsu no Hi"	Mari Amachi
23 July	"Koisuru Natsu no Hi"	Mari Amachi
30 July	"Koisuru Natsu no Hi"	Mari Amachi
6 August	"Koisuru Natsu no Hi"	Mari Amachi
13 August	"Koisuru Natsu no Hi"	Mari Amachi
20 August	"Koisuru Natsu no Hi"	Mari Amachi
27 August	"Watashi no Kare wa Hidarikiki"	Megumi Asaoka
3 September	"Watashi no Kare wa Hidarikiki"	Megumi Asaoka
10 September	"Kokoro no Tabi"	Tulip
17 September	"Kokoro no Tabi"	Tulip
24 September	"Chigireta Ai"	Hideki Saijo
1 October	"Chigireta Ai"	Hideki Saijo
8 October	"Chigireta Ai"	Hideki Saijo
15 October	"Chigireta Ai"	Hideki Saijo
22 October	"Kandagawa"	Kousetsu Minami & Kaguyahime
29 October	"Kandagawa"	Kousetsu Minami & Kaguyahime
5 November	"Kandagawa"	Kousetsu Minami & Kaguyahime
12 November	"Kandagawa"	Kousetsu Minami & Kaguyahime
19 November	"Kandagawa"	Kousetsu Minami & Kaguyahime
26 November	"Kandagawa"	Kousetsu Minami & Kaguyahime
3 December	"Kojin Jugyō"	Finger 5
10 December	"Kandagawa"	Kousetsu Minami & Kaguyahime
17 December	"Chiisana Koi no Monogatari"	Agnes Chan
24 December	"Ai no Jūjika"	Hideki Saijo
31 December	no ranking	no ranking

== Number one albums and LPs ==
Cash Box

The following reached number 1 on the Cash Box LPs chart:

- 6 January, 13 January, 20 January, 27 January and 3 February: Genkidesu - Takuro Yoshida
- 10 February, 17 February, 24 February and 3 March: Melodies For Tomorrow - Mari Amachi. The Japanese name of this album is "Asu Eno Melody" (Japanese: 明日へのメロディー).
- 10 March: Elvis in Hawaii - Elvis Presley
- 17 March, 24 March, 31 March and 7 April: Onna No Michi - Shiro Miya & Pinkara Trio
- 14 April: Garo 2 - Garo
- 21 April, 28 April and 5 May: Haru No Otozure (Japanese: 春のおとずれ) - Rumiko Koyanagi
- 19 May, 26 May, 2 June and 9 June: Wakaba No Sasayaki (Japanese: 若葉のささやき) - Mari Amachi
- 16 June: The Dark Side of the Moon - Pink Floyd
- 23 June: 1967–1970 - The Beatles
- 30 June, 7 July, 14 July and 4 August: 1962–1966 - The Beatles
- 21 July and 28 July: Otogi Zoshi - Takuro Yoshida
- 11 August, 25 August, 1 September, 8 September, 15 September, 22 September, 29 September, 13 October and 20 October: Super Delux (Japanese: スーパー・デラックス) - Cherish
- 18 August, 27 October and 3 November: Now & Then - The Carpenters
- 10 November, 17 November, 24 November, 1 December, 8 December, 15 December and 22 December: Kaguya Hime 3rd - Kaguyahime

Oricon

The following reached number 1 on the Oricon LP chart:

- 15 January: Onna No Michi - Shiro Miya & Pinkara Trio
- 22 January, 29 January and 5 February: Melodies For Tomorrow - Mari Amachi
- 12 February, 19 February and 26 February: Aloha from Hawaii via Satellite - Elvis Presley
- 5 March, 12 March, 19 March, 26 March and 2 April: Garo 2 - Garo
- 9 April: Haru No Otozure (Japanese: 春のおとずれ) - Rumiko Koyanagi
- 16 April and 23 April: Hot Menu '73: The Best Of Warner/Reprise/Atlantic (Japanese: ホット・メニュー'73)
- 7 May, 14 May, 21 May and 28 May: Wakaba No Sasayaki (Japanese: 若葉のささやき) - Mari Amachi
- 4 June, 11 June, 18 June, 25 June and 9 July: 1962–1966 - The Beatles
- 2 July: Otogi Zoshi - Takuro Yoshida
- 16 July, 23 July, 30 July, 6 August, 13 August, 20 August, 27 August, 3 September, 10 September, 17 September, 24 September, 1 October and 8 October: Super Delux (Japanese: スーパー・デラックス) - Cherish
- 15 October: Now & Then - The Carpenters
- 22 October, 29 October, 5 November, 12 November, 19 November, 26 November and 3 December: Kaguya Hime 3rd - Kaguyahime
- 10 December: Best Selection '74 (Japanese: ベスト・セレクション'74) - Cherish
- 17 December and 24 December: Kōri no Sekai - Yōsui Inoue

== Annual charts ==
Shiro Miya & Pinkara Trio's Onna no Michi was number 1 in the Oricon annual singles chart and the Cash Box annual singles chart.

== Film and television ==
The music of Seigenki Tōi Hi no Haha wa Utsukushiku (Japanese: 青幻記 遠い日の母は美しく), by Tōru Takemitsu, won the 28th Mainichi Film Award for Best Music. The music of Lady Snowblood includes the song "Shura No Hana" (Japanese: 修羅の花) by Meiko Kaji.

== Classical music ==
The Japanese conductor Seiji Ozawa is appointed musical director of the Boston Symphony Orchestra and leads the Toho Gakuen School of Music Orchestra in a Concert for Peace in Hiroshima.

== Debuts ==
- Momoe Yamaguchi released her debut single
- 1 September: Candies released their first single Anata ni Muchū

== Other singles released ==
- Watashi no Aoi Tori by Junko Sakurada
- Kakurenbo by Sayuri Ishikawa
- 30 April: Mori Wo Kakeru Koibito Tachi by Megumi Asaoka
- 1 May: Kizutsuku Sedai or "Suffering Age" by Saori Minami
- 21 August: Irozuku Machi by Saori Minami

== Other albums released ==
- Anata ni Muchū: Uchiki na Candies by Candies
- Hikō-ki Gumo by Yumi Arai
- Debut Album by Sayuri Ishikawa
- Hosono House by Haruomi Hosono
- Happy End by Happy End
- Make Up by Flower Travellin' Band
- 20 September: The Bad Boys released "Meet The Bad Boys"

== See also ==
- Timeline of Japanese music
- 1973 in Japan
- 1973 in music
- w:ja:1973年の音楽
