= X -Cross- =

- Artwork by Hirohiko Araki

Studio album by Sayuri Ishikawa
- Released: September 19, 2012
- Genre: J-pop
- Length: 40:54
- Label: Teichiku Records

Sayuri Ishikawa chronology
Sayuri IV (2009)	X -Cross- (2012)	X -Cross II- (2014)

X -Cross- (simply read as "Cross") is the 57th studio album released by Japanese kayōkyoku singer Sayuri Ishikawa, celebrating her 40th anniversary in the music industry. She collaborated with Shigeru Kishida of Quruli, Kazufumi Miyazawa of The Boom, Tamio Okuda, Michiru, Hako Yamasaki, Neko Saito, and Hiroko Taniyama to write the tracks on the album. The cover was drawn by JoJo's Bizarre Adventure author Hirohiko Araki, displaying Ishikawa in one of his characters' iconic poses and wearing hair accessories inspired by his works. Ishikawa's performance at the 63rd NHK Kōhaku Uta Gassen would also involve a collaboration with Araki.

The album did not break the top 100 on the Oricon Weekly Album Charts, only reaching 127 with two weeks spent on the charts.

== Track listing ==
No.	Title	Lyrics	Music	Length
1.	"Sanzashi" (山査子, "Crataegus cuneata")	Shigeru Kishida	Kishida	3:34
2.	"Sagaribana" (さがり花, "Drooping Flowers")	Kazufumi Miyazawa	Miyazawa	3:47
3.	"Afureru Namida" (あふれる涙, "Overflowing With Tears")	Kenji Ueda, Sayuri	Tamio Okuda	5:23
4.	"Hana wa Saku" (花は咲く, "Flowers Bloom")	Shunji Iwai	Yoko Kanno, Michiru	4:32
5.	"Umarekawaru Yori mo" (生まれ変わるよりも, "From Being Born Again")	Miyazawa	Miyazawa	5:22
6.	"Ishinomaki Fukkōbushi" (石巻復興節, "Ishinomaki Reconstruction Bushi")	The residents of Ishinomaki, Kishida, Sayuri	Kishida	8:28
7.	"Hanabi" (花火, "Fireworks")	Hako Yamasaki	Yamasaki	5:01
8.	"Shōjo" (少女, "Girl")	Hiroko Taniyama	Taniyama, Neko Saito	4:51
Total length:				40:54

== See also ==
- Sayuri Ishikawa discography
