= Debut Album (Sayuri Ishikawa album) =

Studio album by Sayuri Ishikawa
- Released: August 25, 1973
- Genre: Kayōkyoku, Enka
- Length
- Label: Nippon Columbia

Sayuri Ishikawa chronology
Debut Album (1973)	Omoide / Aoi Sanmyaku (1974)

Singles from Debut Album
- 1. "Kakurenbo" Released: March 25, 1973; 2. "Aoi Tsukiyo no Sampo Michi" Released: August 10, 1973

Debut Album (デビュー・アルバム, Debyū Arubamu) is the debut and first studio album by Japanese singer Sayuri Ishikawa (石川さゆり). The album was released on 25 August 1973 by Nippon Columbia (日本コロムビア). Of the twelve songs in the album, four are original songs written for Ishikawa. The other eight songs are covers.

== Track listing ==
#	Title	Original title	Lyricist	Composer	Arranger	Notes
1	"Aoi Tsukiyo no Sampo Michi"	青い月夜の散歩道	Michio Yamagami (山上路夫)	Kosho Inomata (猪俣公章)	Toshio Kurita (栗田俊夫)	Written for Ishikawa
2	"Akai Fusen"	赤い風船	Kazumi Yasui (安井かずみ)	Kyohei Tsusumi (筒美京平)	Toshio Kurita (栗田俊夫)	Originally sung by Miyoko Asada 浅田美代子
3	"Watashi no Joka-machi"	わたしの城下町	Kazumi Yasui (安井かずみ)	Masaaki Hirao (平尾昌晃)	Shiroo Tsuchimochi (土持城夫)	Originally sung by Rumiko Koyanagi 小柳ルミ子
4	"Tenshi mo Yume Miru"	天使も夢みる	Yu Aku (阿久悠)	Taiji Nakamura (中村泰士)	Toshio Kurita (栗田俊夫)	Originally sung by Junko Sakurada 桜田淳子
5	"Sensei"	せんせい	Yu Aku (阿久悠)	Minoru Endo (遠藤実)	Shiroo Tsuchimochi (土持城夫)	Originally sung by Masako Mori 森昌子
6	"Tsugaru no Sato"	津軽の里	Michio Yamagami (山上路夫)	Kosho Inomata (猪俣公章)	Mitsuru Kotani (小谷充)	Written for Ishikawa
7	"Kakurenbo"	かくれんぼ	Michio Yamagami (山上路夫)	Kosho Inomata (猪俣公章)	Mitsuru Kotani (小谷充)	Written for Ishikawa
8	"Toshigoro"	としごろ	Michio Yamagami (山上路夫)	Kosho Inomata (猪俣公章)	Mitsuru Kotani (小谷充)	Originally sung by Momoe Yamaguchi 山口百恵
9	"Yugao no Ame"	夕顔の雨	Kazuya Senge (千家和也)	Shunichi Tokura (都倉俊一)	Shiroo Tsuchimochi (土持城夫)	Originally sung by Masako Mori 森昌子
10	"Wakaba no Sasayaki "	若葉のささやき	Michio Yamagami (山上路夫)	Minoru Endo (遠藤実)	Toshio Kurita (栗田俊夫)	Originally sung by Mari Amachi 天地真理
11	"Haru no Otozure"	春のおとずれ	Michio Yamagami (山上路夫)	Koichi Morita (森田公一)	Toshio Kurita (栗田俊夫)	Originally sung by Rumiko Koyanagi 小柳ルミ子
12	"Anato to Watashi no Mura-matsuri"	あなたと私の村祭り	Michio Yamagami (山上路夫)	Kosho Inomata (猪俣公章)	Toshio Kurita (栗田俊夫)	Written for Ishikawa

== Singles ==
Kakurenbo (かくれんぼ) was originally released as the first single of Ishikawa with Tsugaru no Sato (津軽の里) as its B-side.

Aoi Tsukiyo no Sampo Michi (青い月夜の散歩道) was Ishikawa's second single with Anato to Watashi no Mura-matsuri (あなたと私の村祭り) as its B-side.

== Personnel ==
The album came with a 60 cm x 30 cm centerfold portrait of Ishikawa. However, the sleeve does not credit the photographer for the portrait nor for the album's cover photo. Even though this album was released in Ishikawa's debut year 1973, Ishikawa is not credited with the title “Columbia Princess" (コロムビア・プリンセス), the title used by Nippon Columbia to promote the artist in her debut year.

The sleeve credits Columbia Yurikago Kai (コロムビアゆりかご会 chorus) for track 1, Columbia Studio Orchestra (コロムビア・スタジオ・オーケストラ) for tracks 1, 6, 7 and 12, and the Shin Shitsunai-gaku Kyokai (新室内楽協会) for the other songs.

== See also ==
- Sayuri Ishikawa discography
- 1973 in Japanese music
