= Hirohiko Araki =

Japanese manga artist (born 1960)

- 荒木 飛呂彦
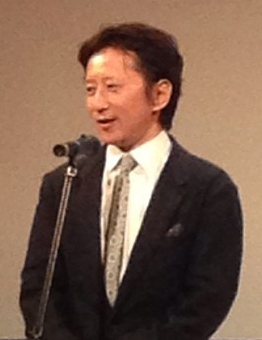
- Araki at the 17th Japan Media Arts Festival in 2013
- Born: Toshiyuki Araki; June 7, 1960 (age 66); Sendai, Japan
- Occupation: Manga artist
- Spouse: Asami Araki
- Children: 1
- Writing career
- Period: 1980–present
- Genres: Action, adventure, supernatural
- Subjects: Shōnen manga, seinen manga
- Notable works: Baoh; JoJo's Bizarre Adventure

Toshiyuki Araki (Japanese: 荒木 利之, Hepburn: Araki Toshiyuki; born June 7, 1960), better known as Hirohiko Araki (荒木 飛呂彦, Araki Hirohiko), is a Japanese manga artist. He is best known for his long-running series JoJo's Bizarre Adventure, which began publication in Weekly Shōnen Jump in 1987 and has over 120 million copies in circulation as of 2022, making it one of the best-selling manga series in history.

== Biography ==
=== Early life ===
Araki grew up in Sendai, Japan, with his parents and younger identical twin sisters. He cites his sisters' annoyances as the reason he spent time alone in his room reading manga, naming Ai to Makoto as the most important one to him. He supposes that his father's art books were his motive for drawing manga; he was particularly influenced by the work of French artist Paul Gauguin, as well as British and American rock stars including David Bowie and Prince.

After a school friend praised his manga, Araki began secretly drawing manga behind his parents' backs. He submitted his first work to a magazine in his first year of high school. All his submissions were rejected while other artists his age or younger were making successful debuts. He decided to go to the publishers' offices in Tokyo in person to find out why, taking his manga Poker Under Arms with him, which he stayed up all-night to finish. The Shueisha editor he met highly criticized the work, but said it had potential and told Araki to clean it up for the upcoming Tezuka Awards.

=== Debut and JoJo's Bizarre Adventure ===
Araki left Miyagi University of Education before graduating, and made his debut under the name Toshiyuki Araki (荒木 利之, Araki Toshiyuki) in 1980 with the wild west one-shot Poker Under Arms, which was a "Selected Work" at that year's Tezuka Award. His first serialization was Cool Shock B.T. in 1983, about a young magician who solves mysteries. He began incorporating graphic violence into his work with Baoh in 1984. It tells the story of a man who is implanted with a parasite by an evil organization, giving him superhuman powers, and follows as he fights against them. Baoh was adapted into an OVA in 1989; the manga was released in the US by Viz Media in 1990 (in tankōbon form in 1995), but the OVA didn't get a stateside release until 2002. With The Gorgeous Irene in 1985, large, muscular characters became an emphasis of his art style, which would become more flamboyant throughout his later works.

His next series would become his magnum opus, 1987's JoJo's Bizarre Adventure. The series begins in 1880s England and follows Jonathan Joestar (nicknamed JoJo) and his adopted brother Dio Brando, who eventually tries to kill their father in order to obtain his share of inheritance. When confronted, Dio puts on an ancient mask that turns him into a vampire. Jonathan then learns a breathing technique named Hamon, which grants JoJo various powers to combat Dio. Subsequent arcs of JoJo follow the descendants of the Joestar family, and many are set in different parts of the world. The third and most popular arc, Stardust Crusaders, downplays the vampire story and Hamon technique, instead introducing a new power known as Stands, which remain the focus of the series today. Still being serialized almost 40 years later, JoJo's Bizarre Adventure has been adapted into numerous other forms of media and the manga had 120 million collected volumes in print by 2022. From 2011 to 2021, Araki produced JoJolion, the eighth story arc of the series, serialized in Ultra Jump magazine.

While not directly involved in the production of the internationally-popular TV adaptations by David Production and Warner Bros., Araki was an executive overseer and big-picture decision-maker, working to keep the adaptations faithful to the source material. The practical and conceptual difficulty of the original work required producer Hisataka Kasama to hire two directors with different skill sets, Naokatsu Tsuda and Kenichi Suzuki, to work collaboratively on the project. The anime adaptation for the seventh installment in the series, Steel Ball Run, was officially announced on April 12, 2025, at the JOJODAY event.

=== Recent work ===
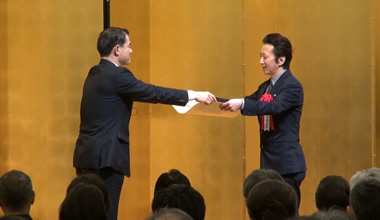
Araki (right) receiving an Art Encouragement Prize from Masahiko Shibayama, 2019

The September 2007 issue of Cell had a cover drawn by Araki with a ligase represented as one of his Stands. In 2008, Araki drew the cover art for a collection featuring Yasunari Kawabata's short story "The Dancing Girl of Izu". He drew the cover for the limited edition of Base Ball Bear's "Breeeeze Girl" single, which actually takes an image from the JoJo manga.

Also in 2009, Hirohiko Araki was one of five artists selected by the Musée du Louvre to create original works set at the famous museum. His piece Rohan at the Louvre starred JoJo's Rohan Kishibe and was shown at the exhibit titled Le Louvre invite la bande dessinée ("The Louvre Invites Comic-Strip Art"), which was created to show the diversity of comics, from January 19 to April 13. Rohan at the Louvre was highly praised. The following year, Rohan at the Louvre was published in France and ran in Japan's Ultra Jump. It was released in the US by NBM Publishing in February 2012.

From September 17 to October 6, 2011, the Gucci store in Shinjuku hosted the Gucci x Hirohiko Araki x Spur "Rohan Kishibe Goes to Gucci" Exhibition, a collaboration between the luxury Italian clothing brand, JoJo's creator, and the fashion magazine Spur. The exhibit celebrated the 90th anniversary of Gucci and featured a life-size figure of Rohan Kishibe, as well as numerous illustrations by Araki; including actual pieces of the brand's own 2011–2012 fall/winter collection and his own original fashion designs. For Spur, Araki drew Kishibe Rohan meets Gucci., a full-color one-shot featuring Rohan Kishibe that ran in its October 2011 issue. Spur once again ran a JoJo spinoff by Araki, Jolyne, Fly High with Gucci starring Jolyne Cujoh from Part 6, in their February 2013 issue. A free English translation is available on Gucci's Facebook page.

To raise awareness of the ongoing reconstruction efforts of the Hiraizumi ruins, that were damaged by the March 2011 Tōhoku earthquake and tsunami and declared a UNESCO World Heritage Site in June, Araki drew artwork depicting the ruins. A "Hirohiko Araki JoJo Exhibition" opened in Araki's native Sendai at the end of July 2012 to celebrate the 25th anniversary of JoJo's Bizarre Adventure, it then moved to Tokyo in October.

He drew the album cover for Sayuri Ishikawa's 2012 album X -Cross-, where she performs one of the series' iconic poses and is drawn wearing jewelry from the manga, the cover of the 2012 reprint of Tamaki Saitō's Lacan for Surviving, and the cover of the 2015 compilation album for composer Akira Senju.

A book explaining Araki's methodology on creating manga, titled Manga in Theory and Practice (荒木飛呂彦の漫画術, Araki Hirohiko no Manga Jutsu), was released on April 17, 2015, in Japan; an English translation was later released on June 6, 2017. A stage adaptation of Araki's 1994 one-shot Under Execution, Under Jailbreak ran from November 20 to 29, 2015, at the Galaxy Theatre, then touring the country in December. The play also included elements of his 1996 one-shot Dolce, and His Master.

Araki created an official poster for the 2020 Tokyo Paralympics, titled The Sky above The Great Wave off the Coast of Kanagawa. The piece is heavily inspired by Hokusai's famous woodblock print, The Great Wave off Kanagawa.

On July 29, 2024, Araki unveiled a public art display commissioned by JR West entitled The Fountain Boy in Ōsaka Station, based upon a fountain that was once present up until 2004, as part of the opening of business complex Innogate Osaka.

== Works ==
Cover of Weekly Shōnen Jump #1–2 of 1987 featuring Araki's JoJo's Bizarre Adventure

=== Manga ===
- The Bottle (ザ・ボトル, Za Botoru; 1978)
- Poker Under Arms (武装ポーカー, Busō Pōkā; 1980)
- Outlaw Man (アウトロー・マン, Autorō Man; 1981)
- Say Hi to Virginia (バージニアによろしく, Bājinia ni Yoroshiku; 1982)
- B.T. "The Wicked Boy" (魔少年ビーティー, Mashōnen Bī Tī; October 23, 1982)
- Cool Shock B.T. (魔少年ビーティー, Mashōnen Bī Tī; September 20, 1983 – November 22, 1983)
- Baoh (バオー来訪者, Baō Raihōsha; October 9, 1984 – February 12, 1985)
- The Gorgeous Irene (ゴージャス☆アイリン, Gōjasu Airin; 1985–1986)
- The Lives of Eccentrics (変人偏屈列伝, Henjin Henkutsu Retsuden; 1989–2003)
- Under Execution, Under Jailbreak (死刑執行中脱獄進行中, Shikei Shikkōchū Datsugoku Shinkōchū; December 28, 1994)
- Dolce, and His Master. (ドルチ ～ダイ・ハード・ザ・キャット～, Doruchi Dai Hādo Za Kyatto; 1996)

==== JoJo's Bizarre Adventure ====
- JoJo's Bizarre Adventure (ジョジョの奇妙な冒険, JoJo no Kimyō na Bōken; December 2, 1986 – present)
- Thus Spoke Kishibe Rohan (岸辺露伴は動かない, Kishibe Rohan wa Ugokanai; June 24, 1997 – present) (Spin-off of JoJo's Bizarre Adventure)
- Deadman's Questions (デッドマンズQ, Deddomanzu Kuesuchonzu; June 2, 1999 – July 7, 1999) (Spin-off of JoJo's Bizarre Adventure)
- Oingo Boingo Brothers Adventure (オインゴとボインゴ兄弟 大冒険, Oingo to Boingo Kyōdai Daibōken; October 23, 2002) (Spin-off of JoJo's Bizarre Adventure)
- Rohan at the Louvre (岸辺露伴 ルーヴルへ行く, Kishibe Rohan Rūvuru e Iku; April 8, 2010) (Spin-off of JoJo's Bizarre Adventure)
- Rohan Kishibe Goes to Gucci (岸辺露伴 グッチへ行く, Kishibe Rohan Gutchi e Iku; August 23, 2011) (Spin-off of JoJo's Bizarre Adventure)
- Jolyne, Fly High with Gucci (徐倫、GUCCIで飛ぶ, Jorīn, Gutchi de Tobu; December 22, 2012) (Spin-off of JoJo's Bizarre Adventure)

=== Other ===
- Famicom Jump II: Saikyō no Shichinin (February 1991, seventh boss monster design)
- Kamedas (1993, an alternate story of Kochira Katsushika-ku Kameari Kōen-mae Hashutsujo, an illustration)
- JoJo's Bizarre Adventure (November 4, 1993, novel written by Mayori Sekijima and Hiroshi Yamaguchi, illustrated by Araki)
- JoJo 6251 (December 10, 1993, art and guidebook)
- JoJo A-Go!Go! (February 25, 2000, artbook)
- Music is the Key of Life (December 13, 2000, album by Sugiurumn, cover)
- GioGio's Bizarre Adventure II: Golden Heart/Golden Ring (May 28, 2001, novel written by Gichi Ōtsuka and Tarō Miyashō, supervised and illustrated by Araki)
- Life Ground Music (February 27, 2002, album by Sugiurumn, cover)
- Spy! Boy Alex series of Her Majesty the Queen / Alex Rider (2002–2007, covers and interior art for novels 1-6)
- Kochira Katsushika-ku Kameari Kōen-mae Hashutsujo (2006, 30th anniversary special illustration)
- Catwalk (April 26, 2006, single by Soul'd Out, cover)
- Uniqlo (2006, T-shirt design)
- Fist of the North Star (2006, special tribute illustration in Weekly Comic Bunch)
- Cell (September 7, 2007, front cover)
- The Book: JoJo's Bizarre Adventure 4th Another Day (November 26, 2007, novel written by Otsuichi, supervised and illustrated by Arashi)
- "The Dancing Girl of Izu" (2008, cover)
- Breeeeze Girl (June 24, 2009, single by Base Ball Bear, cover of the limited edition)
- Naruto (2009, tenth anniversary special illustration)
- Hirohiko Araki's Bizarre Horror Movie Analysis (June 17, 2011, Essay collection)
- Shameless Purple Haze: Purple Haze Feedback (September 16, 2011, novel written by Kouhei Kadono, illustrated by Araki)
- JoJo's Bizarre Adventure Over Heaven (December 16, 2011, novel written by Nisio Isin, cover)
- Ikinobiru tame no Lacan (Lacan for Survival) (2012, Tamaki Saitō book about Jacques Lacan, cover of the paperback edition)
- Jorge Joestar (September 19, 2012, novel written by Ōtarō Maijō, illustrated by Araki)
- X -Cross- (September 19, 2012, album by Sayuri Ishikawa, cover)
- Hirohiko Araki Works 1981–2012 (2012, artbook)
- JoJomenon (October 5, 2012, artbook)
- Hirohiko Araki's Super-Favorites! Rules of Movies (May 13, 2013, Essay collection)
- JoJoveller (September 19, 2013, artbook set)
- JoJonium (December 4, 2013 – March 4, 2015, covers of the large format rerelease of JoJo's Bizarre Adventure)
- Loopified [Japanese Complete Edition] (October 8, 2014, album by Dirty Loops, cover)
- Main Themes (February 25, 2015, an album by Akira Senju, cover)
- Manga in Theory and Practice (荒木飛呂彦の漫画術, Araki Hirohiko no Manga Jutsu; April 17, 2015)
- Learning Japanese History Through Manga, Volume 2 (October 28, 2016, cover)
- Learning Japanese History Through Manga, Volume 18 (October 28, 2016, cover)
- UOMO (August 24, 2018, cover)
- The Sky above The Great Wave off the Coast of Kanagawa (2020 Tokyo Paralympics poster)
- Hirohiko Araki's New Manga Techniques: How to Create a Villain (November 15, 2024)
