= Hana Kuyō–Sanbyaku Rokujū Go Nichi Koi Moyō =

Studio album by Sayuri Ishikawa
- Released: November 25, 1976
- Genre: Kayōkyoku, Enka
- Length
- Label: Nippon Columbia

Sayuri Ishikawa chronology
Ai-ai Gasa (1976)	Hana Kuyō–Sanbyaku Rokujū Go Nichi Koi Moyō (1976)	Noto Hantō (1977)

Singles from Hana Kuyō–Sanbyaku Rokujū Go Nichi Koi Moyō
- 1. "Hana Kuyō" Released: October 1, 1976; 2. "Tsugaru Kaikyō Fuyugeshiki" Released: January 1, 1977

Hana Kuyō–Sanbyaku Rokujū Go Nichi Koi Moyō (花供養・365日恋もよう), literally meaning "Flower Festival - 365 Days of Love", is the seventh studio album by Japanese singer Sayuri Ishikawa. The album was released on November 25, 1976, by Nippon Columbia. All twelve songs in the album are original songs written for Ishikawa by Yu Aku as lyricist and Takashi Miki (三木たかし) as composer and arranger.

Hana Kuyō–Sanbyaku Rokujū Go Nichi Koi Moyō is a concept album. Each of the twelve songs in the album represents a month of a year. In addition, most songs depict scenes of a particular place in Japan while some are not specific about its location.

Ishikawa's signature song "Tsugaru Kaikyō Fuyugeshiki" originally appeared as the song representing the month of December in this album. Prior to the release of this album, Ishikawa sang "Tsugaru Kaikyō Fuyugeshiki" on stage at her recital in Osaka. This first presentation of the song received critical acclaim, which led to the song's subsequent release as a single in the following year.

The album was originally released in 30 cm LP format. It was reprinted in 12 cm CD format in 1993 by Nippon Columbia.

== Track listing ==
#	Title	Original title	English meaning	Month represented	Scene depicted	Time
1	"Ina no Shira-ume"	伊那の白梅	White plums of Ina	January	Ina valley, Nagano Prefecture	4:50
2	"Yuki Matsuri"	雪まつり	Snow festival	February	Sapporo Snow Festival, Hokkaido	3:00
3	"Nagashi-bina"	流しびな	Flowing hina dolls	March	Doll's Festival in the San'in region	4:31
4	"Hana Kuyō"	花供養	Flower festival	April	Flower Festival	4:12
5	"Nippo Honsen"	日豊本線	Nippō Main Line	May	Nippō Main Line, Miyazaki Prefecture	4:44
6	"Ame-furi Zaka"	雨降り坂	Rain on the slope	June	Dutch Slope in Nagasaki, Nagasaki Prefecture	3:37
7	"Hotaru no Yado"	蛍の宿	The place for fireflies	July	Lake Biwa, Shiga Prefecture	2:50
8	"Seto no Hanabi"	瀬戸の花火	Fireworks in Seto	August	Setouchi region (瀬戸内地方)	3:18
9	"Watashi no Kokoro no Aka-tombo"	私の心の赤とんぼ	The red dragonfly in my heart	September	Awaji Island, Hyogo Prefecture	3:50
10	"Senbon Matsubara Fuji wo Mite"	千本松原富士を見て	Viewing the Fuji at Senbon Matsubara	October	Senbon Matsubara (千本松原), Shizuoka Prefecture	3:40
11	"Yokohama Boshoku"	横浜暮色	Dawn colours at Yokohama	November	Minato no Mieru Oka Park in Yokohama, Kanagawa Prefecture	3:12
12	"Tsugaru Kaikyō Fuyugeshiki"	津軽海峡・冬景色	Winter scene at the Tsugaru Strait	December	Tsugaru Strait, Aomori Prefecture	3:43

Time of each song is from the CD reprint. The sleeve of the original LP album does not have time of the songs.

== Singles ==
"Hana Kuyō" (花供養 Flower Festival), also the main title of the album, was originally released as the fourteenth single by Ishikawa.

"Tsugaru Kaikyō Fuyugeshiki" was released as Ishikawa's fifteenth single following the release of the album.

== Personnel ==
The album sleeve does not credit people other than singer Ishikawa and writers Aku and Miki.

== See also ==
- 1976 in Japanese music
