= Tsugaru Kaikyō Fuyugeshiki =

15th single and signature song by Japanese singer Sayuri Ishikawa

"Tsugaru Kaikyo Fuyu-geshiki"

Single by Sayuri Ishikawa

from the album Hana Kuyou –Sanbyaku Rokuju Go Nichi Koi Moyou
- B-side: "No no Hana no Youni"
- Released: January 1, 1977
- Genre: Kayōkyoku, enka
- Length: 3:43
- Label: Nippon Columbia
- Songwriters: Yu Aku, Takashi Miki

Sayuri Ishikawa singles chronology
"Hana Kuyou" (1976)	"Tsugaru Kaikyo Fuyu-geshiki" (1977)	"Noto Hanto" (1977)

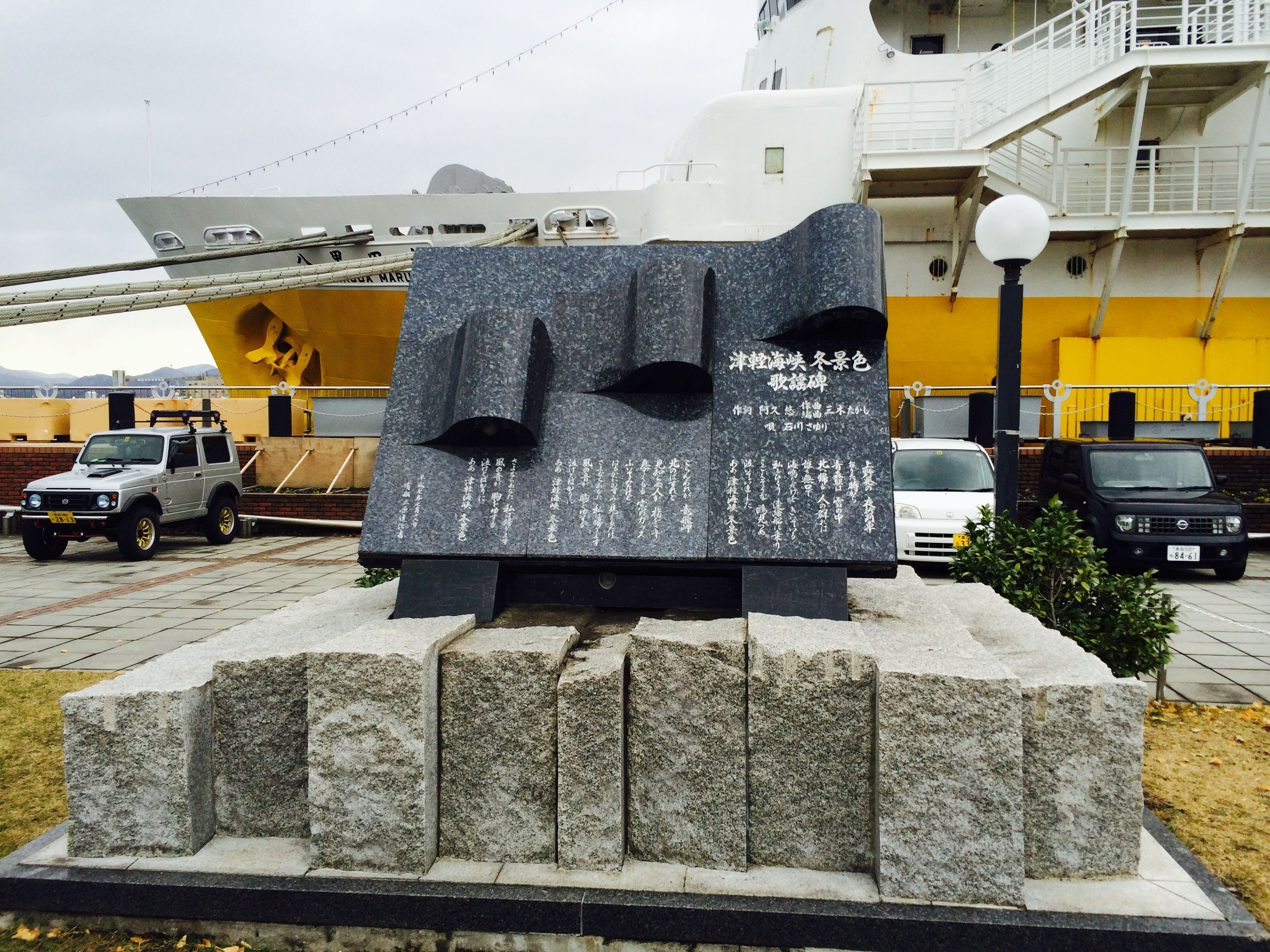
The monument commemorating the hit song "Tsugaru Kaikyō Fuyugeshiki" in front of a retired Seikan train ferry ship at Aomori Port

"Tsugaru Kaikyō Fuyugeshiki" (津軽海峡・冬景色 Tsugaru Strait - Winter Scene) is the 15th single and signature song by Japanese singer Sayuri Ishikawa. The song is written by Yu Aku as lyricist and Takashi Miki as composer and arranger. The song sold over 727,000 units.

== Overview ==
At the time of its release, the primary means of transportation between the Tokyo metropolitan area and Hokkaido (in addition to passenger planes and direct ferries) was via Aomori by train and ferry. The lyrics of the song tell of a woman departing from Ueno Station on a night train to Aomori Station to board the train ferry across the Tsugaru Strait on a winter day, revealing the feelings of a woman bidding farewell to a significant other to return home.

The single was released on 1 January 1977 by Nippon Columbia. Together with “Amagi-goe”, the song is Ishikawa's most popular from her career. The popularity of this song resulted in Ishikawa's first nomination for the Japan Record Award in 1977 but she did not win the award. In the same year, she appeared as a contestant to the annual NHK Kōhaku Uta Gassen for the first time in her career. As of 2018, Ishikawa has sung "Tsugaru Kaikyō Fuyugeshiki" ten times at the NHK Kōhaku Uta Gassen.

"Tsugaru Kaikyō Fuyugeshiki" originally appeared as the song representing the month of December in Ishikawa's concept album titled Hana Kuyou –Sanbyaku Rokuju Go Nichi Koi Moyou and was not intended for single release. Prior to the release of the album, Ishikawa sang the song on stage at her recital in Osaka. This first presentation of the song received critical acclaim, which led to the song's subsequent release as a single in the following year.

There is a monument commemorating the song at the Aomori Port in Aomori Prefecture alongside one of the now-retired train ferry ships Hakkoda-maru which is now converted into a museum ship.

“Tsugaru Kaikyō Fuyugeshiki” is included in the Ryojo Sanbu-saku (旅情三部作 Itinerary Song Trilogy) together with “Noto Hanto” and “Danryu”, the two other songs written by Yu Aku and Takashi Miki and released as singles in the same year 1977.

== Other versions ==
Ishikawa has re-recorded Tsugaru Kaikyō Fuyugeshiki for her remix album Shuto (秋冬) released in 1999 by Pony Canyon. This version is used as the concluding track of Ishikawa's 10-disk cover album and box set “Wonderful 20th century songs” and is also included in the 40th anniversary box set released by Teichiku in 2012.

Ishikawa has recorded an alternate version of the song in 2004 by using Ichigo Ichie, a musical instrument invented in 2003 and resembling both guitar and shamisen, as accompaniment. This version is included in an album titled “Teichiku Hour –Ichigo Ichie” released by Teichiku.

1995, Huang Yiling covered this song into "Our Life, Our Love", and in 2003, Cai Xiaohu covered it as "The Most Infatuated Person".

== B-side ==
The B-side song “No no Hana no Youni” (野の花のように Like a Wildflower) is written by Yu Aku as lyricist and Takashi Miki as composer and arranger. The sleeve has 4:17 as time of the song. The song was written for Ishikawa's recital at Osaka's Shin Kabuki-za in 1976.

== Album inclusion ==
“Tsugaru Kaikyo Fuyu-geshiki” is included in Ishikawa's studio album “Hana Kuyou (Sanbyaku Rokuju Gonichi Koi Moyou)”. The B-side song “No no Hana no Youni” is not included in any of Ishikawa's studio albums but is included in the live recording album of her recital at Shin Kabuki-za.

== Personnel ==
Minoru Aono (青野稔) is credited as photographer for the cover. Columbia Recording Orchestra is credited for both songs.

== Covers ==
- Teresa Teng covered the song in the original Japanese as well as in Chinese under the title '一片落葉' ('A Fallen Leaf').
- Huang Yee-ling - Our whole life our love
- North Korean pop group Pochonbo Electronic Ensemble covered the song on their Japanese tour in 1991, as well as on their 32nd album.
- Japanese singer Angela Aki covered the song for her 2011 album White.

== Other uses ==
The song appeared as the character song for Heiwajima Shizuo in the anime Durarara!!, sung by Ono Daisuke, on the DRRR Wrapping!! Character Song Collection compilation.

== See also ==
- 1977 in Japanese music
