= Hako Yamasaki =

Hako Yamasaki 山崎ハコ
- Born: 山崎 初子; May 18, 1957 (age 69); Ōita, Japan
- Genres: Folk
- Occupations: Singer, actress, writer
- Years active: 1975–present
- Labels: Pony Canyon (1975–1984); Universal Music Japan (1985–1992); Victor Entertainment (1994–1995); Zetima (1997); Tokuma Japan (2002–2006); Nippon Columbia (2008); Teichiku (2011–present)
- Website: hakoyamasaki.com

Hatsuko Yamasaki (山崎 初子; born May 18, 1957), known professionally as Hako Yamasaki (山崎ハコ, Yamasaki Hako), is a Japanese folk singer-songwriter, actress, and writer. She recorded her first album Tobimasu in 1975. In 1991, she made her acting debut.

== Biography ==
In 1974, while attending high school, Yamasaki won the Grand Prix Prize at the "Join Us Folk Competition". During the contest, music producer Tomoi Hoshino scouted and recruited her into his agency, Imadoki. She made her debut in 1975 with the album Tobimasu, which was released under Pony Canyon records. During her debut, she received the nickname "a rival to Miyuki Nakajima", who similarly wrote dark lyrics about love. Yamasaki had moderate success with her career, with albums that sold over 50,000 copies.

During the 1980s, there was a decline in album sales coupled alongside a growing unpopularity of the folk genre of music. In 1985, Yamasaki transferred to Universal Music Japan. Following the release of her live album in 1986, Yamasaki went on a temporary hiatus. In 1994, Yamasaki's first cover album of the year received an award for the Best Planning album at the 36th Japan Music Awards. It was during the 1990s however, when Yamasaki's agency Imadoki went bankrupt. In 2002, Yamasaki made her major musical comeback with her single, "Yasashii Uta" which was released under the Tokuma Japan label. In the same year, she made her voice acting debut in the anime television series, Chibi Maruko-chan.

With the 2020s, Yamasaki's popularity has seen a rise online worldwide, with millions of views of her songs on platforms such as Spotify and YouTube.

== Personal life ==
Following the bankruptcy of her musical agency Imadoki in 1998, Yamasaki was left on the verge of homelessness, working part-time as a dishwasher to make a living. In 2001, she married guitarist and longtime collaborator Hiromi Yasuda. Their marriage lasted until 2020, when Yasuda died due to colorectal cancer.

== Discography ==
=== Albums ===
==== Studio albums ====
List of albums, with selected chart positions
Title	Album details	Peak positions
Title	Album details	JPN Oricon
Tobimasu (飛・び・ま・す)	Released: December 1, 1975; Label: Elec Records; Formats: CD, LP, Cassette tape, digital download, streaming	36
Tsunawatari (綱渡り)	Released: May 25, 1976; Label: Elec Records; Formats: CD, LP, Cassette tape, digital download, streaming	46
Aiiro no Uta (藍色の詩)	Released: March 18, 1977; Label: Canyon Records; Formats: CD, LP, Cassette tape, digital download, streaming	10
Nagareyoi no Uta (流れ酔い唄)	Released: June 10, 1978; Label: Canyon Records; Formats: CD, LP, Cassette tape, digital download, streaming	14
Ningen Magai (人間まがい)	Released: May 21, 1979; Label: Canyon Records; Formats: CD, LP, Cassette tape, digital download, streaming	-
Aruite (歩いて)	Released: October 5, 1980; Label: Canyon Records; Formats: CD, LP, Cassette tape, digital download, streaming	-
Akane (茜)	Released: April 21, 1981; Label: Canyon Records; Formats: CD, LP, Cassette tape, digital download, streaming	-
Gensou Ryokou (幻想旅行)	Released: November 5, 1981; Label: Canyon Records; Formats: CD, LP, Cassette tape, digital download, streaming	-
Gensou Ryokou II (幻想旅行 II)	Released: April 5, 1982; Label: Canyon Records; Formats: CD, LP, Cassette tape, digital download, streaming	-
Glass no Keshiki (硝子の景色)	Released: October 21, 1982; Label: Canyon Records; Formats: CD, LP, Cassette tape, digital download, streaming	-
Kaze no Iro (風の色)	Released: February 21, 1983; Label: Canyon Records; Formats: CD, LP, Cassette tape, digital download, streaming	-
Darjeeling (ダージリン)	Released: September 21, 1983; Label: Canyon Records; Formats: CD, LP, Cassette tape, digital download, streaming	-
Tessen no Hana (てっせんの花)	Released: June 5, 1984; Label: Canyon Records; Formats: CD, LP, Cassette tape, digital download, streaming	-
Hikaru Yume (光る夢)	Released: May 25, 1985; Label: Universal Music Japan; Formats: CD, LP, Cassette tape, digital download, streaming	-
Toki wa Nagarete (時は流れて)	Released: November 25, 1985; Label: Universal Music Japan; Formats: CD, LP, Cassette tape, digital download, streaming	-
Nawatobi (なわとび)	Released: June 1, 1986; Label: Universal Music Japan; Formats: CD, LP, Cassette tape, digital download, streaming	-
Sasuga	Released: February 23, 1990; Label: Universal Music Japan; Formats: CD, Cassette tape, digital download, streaming	-
Nihon Utashuu: Tooi Machi Tooi Sora (日本詩集 〜遠い町 遠い空〜)	Released: April 25, 1990; Label: Universal Music Japan; Formats: CD, Cassette tape, digital download, streaming	-
Memphis Made (メンフィスまで)	Released: May 21, 1992; Label: Universal Music Japan; Formats: CD, digital download, streaming	-
Watashi ga Umareta Hi (私が生まれた日)	Released: May 24, 1995; Label: Victor; Formats: CD, digital download, streaming	-
Yuishin (唯心)	Released: June 21, 1996; Label: Victor; Formats: CD, digital download, streaming	-
En: Enishi (縁 -えにし)	Released: March 7, 2012; Label: Teichiku; Formats: CD, digital download, streaming	-
Utakko (歌っ子)	Released: September 17, 2014; Label: Teichiku; Formats: CD, digital download, streaming	-
Watashi no Uta (私のうた)	Released: September 21, 2016; Label: Teichiku; Formats: CD, digital download, streaming	-
Yokohama kara Aku Yuu Mihappyou Sakuhinshuu (横浜から 阿久悠未発表作品集)	Released: June 20, 2018; Label: Teichiku; Formats: CD, digital download, streaming	-

==== EPS ====
List of albums, with selected chart positions
Title	Album details	Peak positions
Title	Album details	JPN Oricon
Tobimasu...17sai (飛びます…17歳)	Released: November 28, 2001; Label: Mew; Formats: CD, digital download, streaming	-

==== Cover albums ====
List of albums, with selected chart positions
Title	Album details	Peak positions
Title	Album details	JPN Oricon
Ohako (十八番)	Released: September 21, 1994; Label: Victor; Formats: CD, digital download, streaming	-

==== Self-cover albums ====
List of albums, with selected chart positions
Title	Album details	Peak positions
Title	Album details	JPN Oricon
Hako no Ohako (ハコのお箱)	Released: September 27, 1995; Label: Victor; Formats: CD, digital download, streaming	-
Mihappyou (未・発・表)	Released: November 4, 2009; Label: Nippon Columbia; Formats: CD, digital download, streaming	-

==== Live albums ====
List of albums, with selected chart positions
Title	Album details	Peak positions
Title	Album details	JPN Oricon
Yamasaki Hako First Live (山崎ハコ ファーストライブ)	Released: November 10, 1977; Label: Canyon Records; Formats: LP, digital download, streaming	-
Yamasaki Hako Live II Uta Arite (山崎ハコ ライブII 歌在りて)	Released: November 21, 1979; Label: Canyon Records; Formats: LP, digital download, streaming	-
Watashi no Shiawase (私の幸せ)	Released: November 25, 1986; Label: Universal Music Japan; Formats: LP, CD, digital download, streaming	-
Yamasaki Hako Live Set (山崎ハコライブセット)	Released: December 18, 2013; Label: Pony Canyon; Formats: CD, digital download, streaming	-

==== Compilation albums ====
List of albums, with selected chart positions
Title	Album details	Peak positions
Title	Album details	JPN Oricon
Kiseki (軌跡)	Released: July 5, 1980; Label: Canyon; Formats: LP, digital download, streaming	-
Best of Yamasaki Hako (ベスト オブ 山崎ハコ)	Released: February 5, 1984; Label: Canyon; Formats: LP, digital download, streaming	-
Best Selection (ベストセレクション)	Released: June 5, 1985; Label: Canyon; Formats: LP, CD, Cassette tape, digital download, streaming	-
The Best of Yamasaki Hako (ザ・ベスト・オブ・山崎ハコ)	Released: July 25, 1985; Label: Universal Music Japan; Formats: LP, CD, Cassette tape, digital download, streaming	-
Super Best (スーパーベスト)	Released: November 21, 1986; Label: Pony; Formats: LP, CD, Cassette tape, digital download, streaming	-
Yamasaki Hako Best (山崎ハコ ベスト)	Released: November 21, 1987; Label: Pony; Formats: LP, CD, Cassette tape, digital download, streaming	-
Best	Released: August 29, 1990; Label: Universal Music Japan; Formats: CD, Cassette tape, digital download, streaming	-
For your Good Days	Released: November 21, 1992; Label: Universal Music Japan; Formats: CD, digital download, streaming	-
Yamasaki Hako Best Album (山崎ハコ ベストアルバム)	Released: November 21, 1996; Label: Pony Canyon; Formats: CD, digital download, streaming	-
Yamasaki Hako Best Collection Dear My Songs (山崎ハコ ベストコレクション Dear My Songs)	Released: December 24, 2001; Label: Pony Canyon; Formats: CD, digital download, streaming	-
Anthology Yamasaki Hako Best (Anthology 山崎ハコ BEST)	Released: August 21, 2002; Label: Pony Canyon; Formats: CD, digital download, streaming	-
Yamasaki Hako Golden Best (山崎ハコ ゴールデン☆ベスト)	Released: March 1, 2006; Label: Universal Music Japan; Formats: CD, digital download, streaming	-
Utaitaino (歌いたいの)	Released: May 24, 2006; Label: Tokuma Japan; Formats: CD, digital download, streaming	-
Yamasaki Hako Best Collection History 1975-1984 (山崎ハコ best collection history 1975-1984)	Released: July 16, 2008; Label: Pony Canyon; Formats: CD, digital download, streaming	-
Hako Desu 1975-2014 (ハ・コ・で・す 1975-2014)	Released: October 1, 2014; Label: Pony Canyon; Formats: CD, digital download, streaming	-

=== Singles ===
List of singles, with selected chart positions
Year	Single	Peak chart positions	Label	Formats
Year	Single	JPN Physical	Label	Formats
1978	"Nagareyoi Uta" （流れ酔い唄）	97	Canyon	CD, LP, Cassette, digital download, streaming
1979	"Jigoku Kokoro dake Aishite" （地獄「心だけ愛して」）	-	Canyon	CD, LP, Cassette, digital download, streaming
1979	"Lullaby Yokosuka" （ララバイ横須賀）	-	Canyon	CD, LP, Cassette, digital download, streaming
1980	"Otoko no Whisky" （男のウ井スキー）	-	Canyon	CD, LP, Cassette, digital download, streaming
1981	"Orie no Uta" （織江の唄）	-	Canyon	CD, LP, Cassette, digital download, streaming
1982	"Gensou Ryokou" （幻想旅行）	-	Canyon	CD, LP, Cassette, digital download, streaming
1983	"Ame ni Utaenai" （雨に唄えない）	-	Canyon	CD, LP, Cassette, digital download, streaming
1984	"Kaze no Uta" （風の歌）	-	Canyon	CD, LP, Cassette, digital download, streaming
1984	"Machi yo" （町よ）	-	Canyon	CD, LP, Cassette, digital download, streaming
1985	"Tell a lie" （テル・ア・ライ）	-	Universal Music Japan	CD, LP, Cassette, digital download, streaming
1990	"Anou"	-	Universal Music Japan	CD, Cassette, digital download, streaming
1990	"Kibun wo Käte" （気分を変えて）	-	Universal Music Japan	CD, Cassette, digital download, streaming
1992	"Hotaru" （蛍）	-	Universal Music Japan	CD, digital download, streaming
1994	"Acacia no Ame ga Yamu Toki" （アカシアの雨がやむとき）	-	Victor	CD, digital download, streaming
1995	"Watashi ga Umareta Hi" （私が生まれた日）	-	Victor	CD, digital download, streaming
1997	"Tadoritsuitara Itsumo Ame Furi" （たどりついたらいつも雨ふり）	-	Zetima	CD, digital download, streaming
1997	"Wasshoi Nippon" （わっしょいニッポン）	-	Zetima	CD, digital download, streaming
1997	"Tazunehito: Boukensha" （たずね人 -冒険者-）	-	Zetima	CD, digital download, streaming
2002	"Yasashii Uta" （やさしい歌）	-	Tokuma Japan	CD, digital download, streaming
2004	"Setsuna no Yume" （刹那の夢）	-	Tokuma Japan	CD, digital download, streaming
2006	"Tessen Komoriuta" （てっせん子守唄）	-	Tokuma Japan	CD, digital download, streaming
2008	"Beetle"	-	Nippon Columbia	CD, digital download, streaming
2011	"Anata no Koe" （あなたの声）	-	Teichiku	CD, digital download, streaming

== Songwriting credits ==
List of non-studio album, song-writing credits that feature Hako Yamasaki
Title	Year	Artist	Album/Single
"Shiroi Hana"	1978	Mirei Kitahara	Sumie no Uta
"Nosappu Misaki"	1981	Mirei Kitahara	Best Album
"Dancing Doll"	1980	Miyuki Matsuda	Dancing Doll
"Chiisana Mondai"	1984	Agnes Chan	Chiisana Mondai
"Glass no Pinocchio"	1990	Nae Yuuki	Glass no Pinocchio
"Fuyu no Tokyo", "Nijiiro no Sekai Chizu"	1993	Nae Yuuki	Shun
"Art of Loving"	1993	Minami Saori	Art of Loving
"Daredare no Buki"	1995	Nae Yuuki	Alamode
"Hanabi"	2012	Sayuri Ishikawa	X-Cross
