= Watashi no Aoi Tori =

"Watashi No Aoi Tori"

Single by Junko Sakurada

from the album Watashi No Aoi Tori
- B-side: "Koibito Ni Natte!"
- Released: August 25, 1973
- Genre: Kayōkyoku, J-Pop
- Length: 3:05
- Label: JVC
- Songwriters: Yū Aku and Yasunori Nakamura

Junko Sakurada singles chronology
"Tenshi No Hatsukoi" (1973)	"Watashi No Aoi Tori" (1973)	"Hana Monogatari" (1973)

"Watashi No Aoi Tori" (わたしの青い鳥; lit. My Bluebird) is a popular song written by lyricist Yū Aku and composer Yasunori Nakamura, and originally recorded and released by idol Junko Sakurada.

The single was released on August 25, 1973 and became one of Junko's signature songs, as well as a standard in the Japanese songbook. The single sold over 150,000 copies and earned Junko the Best Newcomer award at the 15th edition of the Japan Record Award.

The song was originally released on Junko's "Watashi No Aoi Tori" album released in September 1973, but has subsequently been released on several best of and greatest hits compilations, as well as Shōwa and Kayōkyoku compilations.

== Track listing (7" Vinyl) ==
No.	Title	Length
1.	"Watashi No Aoi Tori" (わたしの青い鳥, "My Bluebird")	3:05
2.	"Koibito Ni Natte!" (恋人になって!, "Become My Lover!")	2:46

== Chart positions ==
Charts (1973)	Peak position
Japanese Oricon Singles Chart	18

== Covers ==
- Akiko Isozaki covered the song in 1989 for the album "Cuties In Variation".
- D&D covered the song for the 1997 Yu Aku tribute album "VELFARRE J-POP NIGHT presents DANCE with YOU".
- Morning Musume covered the album for their 2008 Yu Aku tribute album Cover You.
- °C-ute member Airi Suzuki covered the song for her performance as Junko Sakurada in the movie "Yu Aku Monogatari".

== See also ==
- 1973 in Japanese music
