= Kakurenbo (Sayuri Ishikawa song) =

Single by Sayuri Ishikawa

from the album Debut Album
- B-side: "Tsugaru no Sato"
- Released: March 25, 1973
- Genre: Kayōkyoku, Enka
- Length: 3:26
- Label: Nippon Columbia
- Songwriters: Michio Yamagami, Kosho Inomata

Sayuri Ishikawa singles chronology
"Kakurenbo" (1973)	"Aoi Tsukiyo no Sampo Michi" (1973)

"Kakurenbo" (かくれんぼ Hide and Seek) is the title of the debut song and single by Japanese singer Sayuri Ishikawa. The song is written by Michio Yamagami (山上路夫) as lyricist, Kosho Inomata (猪俣公章) as composer and Mitsuru Kotani (小谷充) as arranger. The single was released on March 25, 1973 by Nippon Columbia. On the cover, Ishikawa is credited with the title "Columbia Princess" (コロムビア・プリンセス), the title used by Nippon Columbia to promote the artist in her debut year. The sleeve has 3:26 as time of the song.

== Other versions ==
At her 10th anniversary concert in 1982, Ishikawa revealed that the lyrics of Kakurenbo was originally set to a melody totally different from the one studio recorded and released as her debut single. This original version was never released commercially.

Ishikawa has recorded the song with guitar accompaniment for inclusion in her 20th anniversary box set "Michi" (道) released in 1992 by Nippon Columbia.

For Ishikawa's 40th anniversary concert in 2012, lyricist Yamagami contributed two new verses to the song by reflecting 40 years of Ishikawa's singing career. Ishikawa sang this 40th anniversary version of Kakurenbo on stage at the concert. The studio recording of this version is not included in Ishikawa's studio albums but is included in her compilation album titled "Sayuri Ishikawa 2013 Nen Zenkyoku-shu" (石川さゆりベスト2013年全曲集) released by Teichiku in 2013.

The B-side song of Ishikawa's 45th single "Amagi-goe" (天城越え) bears the same title "Kakukrembo" (隠れんぼ), but is a different song.

== B-side ==
The B-side song "Tsugaru no Sato" (津軽の里 A Village in Tsugaru) is written by Michio Yamagami as lyricist, Kosho Inomata as composer and Mitsuru Kotani as arranger. The sleeve has 3:30 as time of the song.

== Album appearance ==
Both Kakurenbo and Tsugaru no Sato are included in Ishikawa's studio album titled "Debut Album" (デビュー・アルバム).

== Credits and personnel ==
The sleeve has a brief profile of Ishikawa at the time of her debut such as her real name, date of birth, native place and hobby. Akimichi Orimoto (折元昭道) is credited as photographer for the cover. For Kakurenbo, the sleeve credits Columbia Yurikago Kai (コロムビアゆりかご会 chorus) and Columbia Studio Orchestra (コロムビア・スタジオ・オーケストラ) and for the B-side song Tsugaru no Sato, Columbia Studio Orchestra.

== See also ==
- 1973 in Japanese music
