= Garo (band) =

- Genres: Acoustic Japanese rock
- Years active: 1970-1976
- Label: Alfa and Associates/Nippon Columbia
- Past members: Mark Horiuchi, Tommy Hidaka, Masumi "Vocal" Ohno

Garo was a '70s threepiece acoustic Japanese Rock group. The band was composed of Mark Horiuchi (1949–2014), Tommy Hidaka (1950–1986) and Masumi "Vocal" Ohno (b. 1949). They recorded with Columbia (under a deal worked out with then-publishing company Alfa and Associates) and had a few chart hits, including no. 1 "Gakuseigai-no-Kissaten" in 1973. Subsequent singles also reached the top of the Japanese Oricon chart.

Garo formed in 1970 and was the first Japanese acoustic rock band to enter the Japanese charts. Their harmony vocals and acoustic guitar playing, which were heavily influenced by the style of Crosby Stills Nash and Young, became a phenomenon in Japan 1973/74.

Musical differences broke up the band on 20 March 1976. A retrospective 11 CD/DVD box set of the band entitled "GARO BOX" (NO.JP0604-01) was released from Sony Music Entertainment Japan (which inherited the bulk of the Alfa catalogue when it was bought by Sony) on 30 November 2006.

== Discography ==
Singles:

- "Tanpopo" / "hitori de iku sa" たんぽぽ / 一人で行くさ （ 1971.10.10）
- Chikyū wa merīgōrando/ mizuiro no sekai 地球はメリーゴーランド / 水色の世界 （ 1972.02.10）
- Utsukushisugite/ gakuseigainokissaten 美しすぎて / 学生街の喫茶店 （1972.06.20）
- Namidahairanai/ ashitaninareba 涙はいらない / 明日になれば （1972.10.10）
- Kiminotanjōbi/ Sanpo 君の誕生日 /散歩 （ 1973.05.10）
- Romansu/ futaridake no hirusagari ロマンス / 二人だけの昼下り （1973.08.25）
- Ichi-mai no gakufu/ oboete iru kai 一枚の楽譜 / 憶えているかい （ 1973.12.10）
- Hime kyōdai/ boku wa shinanaidarou姫鏡台 / 僕は死なないだろう （1974.03.15）
- Pikunikku/ Nishi-iki ressha ピクニック / 西行き列車 （1974.07.01）
- Bītoruzu wa mō kikanai/ perplexity ビートルズはもう聞かない / 惑 （1974.12.01）
- Ippon no tabako/ gin'yūshijin 一本の煙草 / 吟遊詩人 （1975.05.01）
- Sai go no tegami/ seishun no tabiji さいごの手紙 / 青春の旅路 （ 1976.01.01）
