= Amagi-goe =

Single by Sayuri Ishikawa

from the album Amagi-goe
- B-side: "Kakurenbo"
- Released: July 21, 1986
- Genre: Kayōkyoku, Enka
- Length: 4:56
- Label: Nippon Columbia
- Songwriters: Osamu Yoshioka, Tetsuya Gen

Sayuri Ishikawa singles chronology
"Duo Ame Agari" (1986)	"Amagi-goe" (1986)	"Meoto Zenzai" (1987)

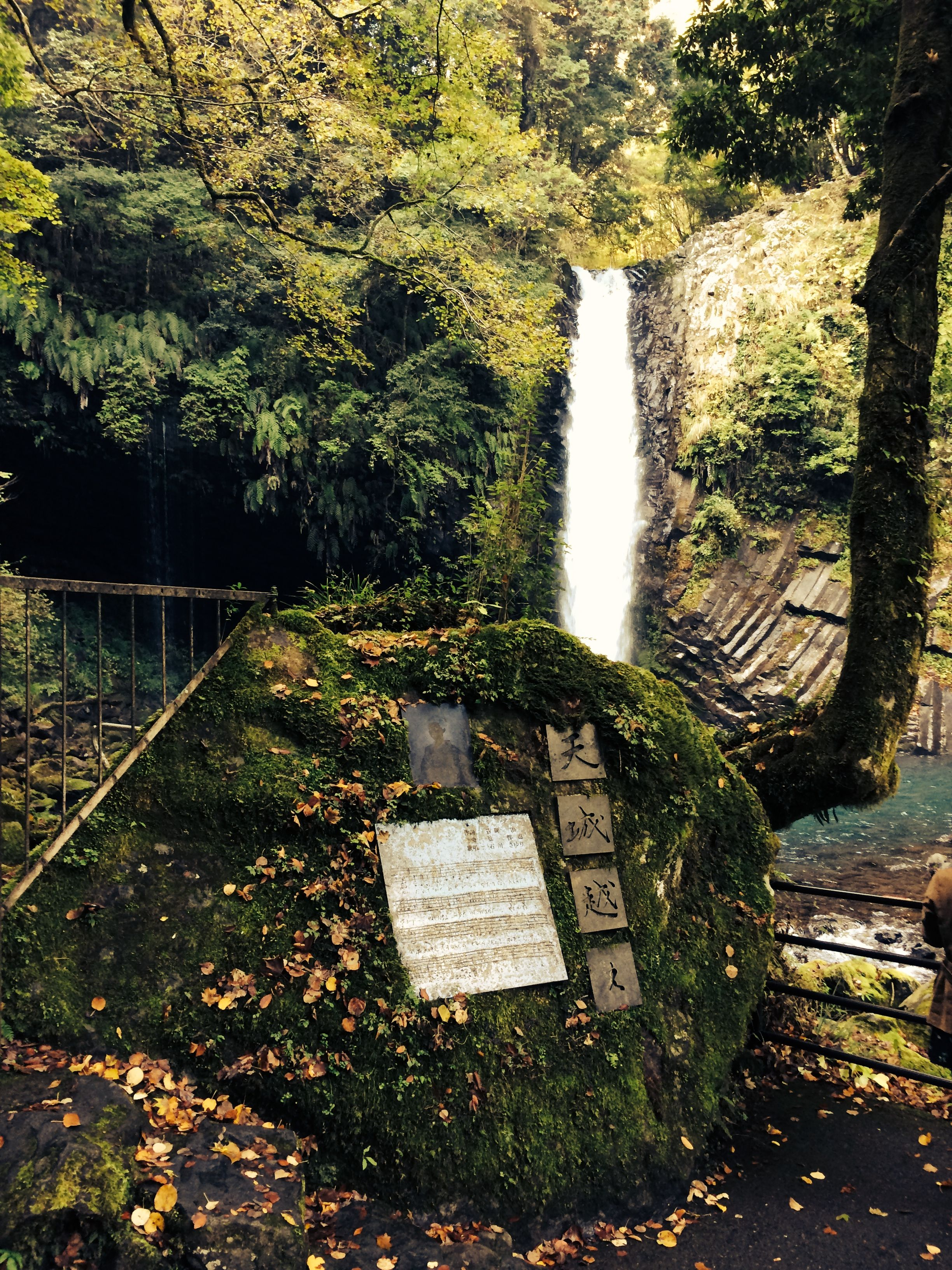
The monument commemorating the hit of Amagi-goe in front of Joren Fall

"Amagi-goe" (天城越え Walk Over Amagi Pass) is the 45th single by Japanese singer Sayuri Ishikawa. The song is written by Osamu Yoshioka as lyricist, Tetsuya Gen (弦哲也) as composer and Nobuyuki Sakuraba (桜庭伸幸) as arranger. The single was released on July 21, 1986, by Nippon Columbia. The sleeve does not have the time of the song.

Together with "Tsugaru Kaikyo Fuyu-geshiki", the song is Ishikawa's most popular from her career. By the song, Ishikawa was nominated for the 28th Japan Record Award in 1986 but she did not win the award. As of 2025, Ishikawa has sung Amagi-goe fourteen times at the annual NHK Kōhaku Uta Gassen.

There is a monument commemorating the song in front of the Jōren Falls in Amagi, Shizuoka Prefecture.

The song is not directly linked to the novella of the same title by Seichō Matsumoto nor to the movie of the same title based on the novella, which was released in 1983.

== Other versions ==
Ishikawa has re-recorded Amagi-goe for her remix album Shunka (春夏) released in 1999 by Pony Canyon. This version is also included in the 40th anniversary box set released by Teichiku in 2012. Time of this version is 4:56.

Marty Friedman produced a Rock (heavy metal) version of the song, and played it with Ishikawa on TV. Major league baseball player Ichiro Suzuki of the Seattle Mariners chose Friedman's rendition as his theme song.

Yumi Uchiyama and Inori Minase (both in character) sung versions of the song, and are included in the original soundtrack compilations of Binbougami ga (under the title "Crossing Amagi") and Masamune-kun's Revenge (as an insert song in Episode 12) respectively.

== B-side ==
The B-side song "Kakurenbo" (隠れんぼ Hide and Seek) is written by Osamu Yoshioka as lyricist, Tetsuya Gen as composer and Nobuyuki Sakuraba as arranger. The sleeve does not have the time of the song. Ishikawa's debut song bears the same title, but is a different song.

== Album appearance ==
Amagi-goe is included in Ishikawa's studio album of the same title. The B-side song Kakurenbo is not included in any of her studio albums.

== Credits and personnel ==
Tatsuo Watanabe (渡辺達生) is credited as photographer for the cover. The sleeve credits the disk as produced by Hori Music (ホリ・ミュージック).

== See also ==
- 1986 in Japanese music
