= Junko Sakurada =

Japanese singer and actress

- 桜田 淳子
- Born: April 1958 (age 68); Akita, Japan
- Occupations: Singer; actress
- Musical career
- Genres: Pop; kayōkyoku
- Instrument: Vocals
- Years active: 1973–1993, 2013–present
- Label: Victor

Junko Sakurada (桜田 淳子, Sakurada Junko; born 1958) is a Japanese singer and actress. She was part of a music trio in 1973, which included Momoe Yamaguchi and Masako Mori. Sakurada then became successful in a solo music career, with 18 top ten singles in the 1970s. Her acting career ran from 1973 to 1993. She received multiple awards for her acting roles, including the Hochi Film Award, Award of the Japanese Academy, Kinema Junpo Award, and Mainichi Film Concours. Following her marriage, in a Blessing ceremony of the Unification Church in 1992, she retired from performing. In 2013, Sakurada made a comeback.

== Early life and career ==
Sakurada was born in 1958. She is a singer and actress. In 1973, she was part of "a hit female trio", which also included musicians Momoe Yamaguchi and Masako Mori. The music trio became popular as part of the television program Producing the Stars (Star Tanjō!); they were known as "The Trio of Third-Year Junior High School Students" ("Hana no Chu 3 Trio"). According to Japan Pop!: Inside the World of Japanese Popular Culture, after this experience in a music group, she went off on her own to develop a solo music career, and became a megastar. Cruising the Anime City: An Otaku Guide to Neo Tokyo described Sakurada as a 1970s music idol, like Pink Lady and Linda Yamamoto.

Throughout the 1970s she released a string of hit singles; nine top 5 singles, and in total eighteen top 10 singles of which "Hajimete no Dekigoto" (First Affair) sold best, grossing over 527,000 copies according to Oricon and peaking at number one. After winning the 4th edition of the Star Tanjō! contest in 1972, with highest ever points and jury votes, she released her first single in February 1973 called "Tenshi Mo Yume Miru" (The Dreams of an Angel) which was written by Yu Aku, and sold over 120,000 copies while peaking at number 12. With the release of her third single, "Watashi No Aoi Tori" (My Bluebird), she won the prestigious Best Newcomer award the 15th edition of the Japan Record Award. In the winter of 1973 following 1974 the single "Hana Monogatari" (Flower Fairy Tales) was her first top ten hit single, which sold over 237,000 copies. She participated for the first time at the 25th edition of the Kōhaku Uta Gassen festival in 1974, with her hit single "Kiiroi Ribbon" (Yellow Ribbon). She would perform for a total of 9 times at the festival. In that same year she also performed in Finland.

Following the success of her single "Hajimete No Dekigoto", the song "Hitori Aruki" (Walking Alone) (which was the theme song for her first ever movie production "Spoon Ippai No Shiawase" (Spoonful of Happiness) was released in March 1975 and peaked at number 4, grossing over 350,000 copies. She was the best selling Japanese female musical artist of 1975, and 4th best selling of 1976. In the summer of 1975 the single "Juushichi No Natsu" (Seventeen Summers) was released, and became her second best selling single; grossing over 404,000 copies and peaking at number 2 on the Oricon charts. At the 17th edition of the Japan Record Awards "Juushichi No Natsu" won her the award for most popular artist voted by the public. In the fall of the same year she was awarded at the 6th edition of the Japan Music Awards for her single "Tenshi No Kuchibiru" (Lips of an Angel), which sold over 281,000 copies and peaked at number 4 on the charts.

After scoring a string of hits in 1976 and 1977 (most notably "Natsu Ni Giyojin" (Beware of the Summer) which sold 360,000 copies, "Ki Ga Tsuite Yo" (I Noticed) which sold 286,000 copies and "Kimagure Venus" (Whimsical Venus) which sold 210,000 copies) she was again awarded at the 20th edition of the Japan Record Awards for her single "Shiawase Shibai" (Pretending to be Happy) which sold over 366,000 copies and peaked at number 3 on the charts (penned by Miyuki Nakajima) with a gold medal. She would score her last top 10 hit single in the summer of 1978 with the disco inspired single "Lipstick", and would release her last single and album in 1983.

Several of her singles have also been featured on the Japanese music show "The Best Ten", which aired from 1978 up to 1989. These include "Shiawase Shibai" (peaking at no. 3), "Oi Kakete Yokohama" (peaking at no. 10), "Lipstick" (peaking at no. 8), "Hatachi Ni Nareba" (peaking at no. 11), "Fuyu Iro No Machi" (peaking at no. 20), and "Santa Monica No Kaze" (peaking at no. 17).

Sakurada's acting career began in 1973 and lasted through 1993, with roles in 13 films and many television dramas. She received multiple awards for her acting roles, including the Hochi Film Award, Award of the Japanese Academy, Kinema Junpo Award, and Mainichi Film Concours. In 1991, her memoir, Gift God Gave Me, was published and the media reported that she had become a "movie heartthrob".

In November 2006, she released a book titled Aisuru Junban.

In October 2013, Junko Sakurada re-appeared in the public eye after an absence of twenty years since getting married. She held a one-night only concert at the Hakuhinkan Theater in Tokyo, to commemorate her 40th year in showbusiness. She also released a best of album, Thanks 40, for the occasion.

In April 2017, Junko Sakurada performed as a guest at the Screen Music Feast held at the Hakuhinkan Theater in Tokyo. She performed songs from the musical Annie Get Your Gun, as well as her 1981 single Keshō. Tickets to the show sold out in a few minutes.

In February 2018, Junko Sakurada released a new album titled My Idology. In March of that same year, she promoted the album with a concert held at Hakuhinkan Theater in Tokyo.

== Personal life ==
Sakurada is a member of the Unification Church founded by Sun Myung Moon in Seoul, South Korea in 1954. According to The Washington Times, which is owned by the Unification Church affiliated News World Communications, Sakurada joined the church in 1977.

In August 1992, Sakurada was married to a Japanese businessman who is also a Unification Church member and an official within the church in a Blessing ceremony of the Unification Church in Seoul, South Korea along with 10,000 other couples representing 131 nations. Sakurada said to journalists that she felt "very happy" to have married a husband selected for her by Moon.

According to The Australian, "Ms Sakurada disappeared from public life soon after the ceremony." One of Sakurada's last roles as a star was in the television piece Don't Call Me Auntie (Obasan Nante Yobanai de) on NHK. According to The Daily Yomiuri, "This was one of Junko Sakurada's last starring roles before she fell out of favor with the public. Since she took part in the Rev. Moon's Unification Church mass marriage in Seoul in August, it is said that her commercial contracts have evaporated." In 1999 a church spokesperson said: "Ms Sakurada is living happily with her husband and three children. She does not want to talk to the press."

== Works ==
=== Music ===
- Watashi No Aoi Tori (1973), winner of the newcomer's prize at the Japan Record Awards
- Hana Monogatari (1973), rose to the Oricon best ten
- Hajimete no Dekigoto (1975), reached Oricon No. 1
- Natsu Ni Goyōjin (1976), prizewinning performance
- Kimagure Venus (1977), nominated for a Japan Record Award
- Shiawase Shibai (1977), gold medal at Japan Record Awards
- Lipstick (1978)
- Santa Monica No Kaze (1979), won Producers' Association award at Japan Song Awards
- Keshō (1981)

Kōhaku Uta Gassen

- Kiiroi Ribbon (黄色いリボン) (1974)
- Hajimete no Dekigoto (はじめての出来事) (1975)
- Natsu ni go Yōjin (夏にご用心) (1976)
- Kimagure Venus (気まぐれヴィーナス) (1977)
- Shiawase Shibai (しあわせ芝居) (1978)
- Santa Monica no Kaze (サンタモニカの風) (1979)
- Utsukushii Natsu (美しい夏) (1980)
- This is a "Boogie" (1981)
- Sērāfuku to Kikanjū (セーラー服と機関銃, Sailor Suit and Machine Gun) (1982)

=== Charted singles ===
#	Title	Date/Position
1	Tenshi mo Yume Miru (天使も夢みる, Angels Dream Too); Debut single	1973-02-25 (#12)
2	Tenshi no Hatsukoi (天使の初恋, Angel's First Love)	1973-05-25 (#27)
3	Watashi No Aoi Tori (わたしの青い鳥, My Blue Bird); Covered by Morning Musume	1973-08-25 (#18)
4	Hana Monogatari (花物語, Flower Story); First top ten hit	1973-11-10 (#9)
5	San Shoku Sumire (三色すみれ, Tricolor Violet)	1974-03-05 (#10)
6	Kiiroi Ribbon (黄色いリボン, Yellow Ribbon)	1974-05-25 (#10)
7	Hana Uranai (花占い, Prophetic Flower)	1974-08-25 (#9)
8	Hajimete no Dekigoto (はじめての出来事, First Affair)	1974-12-05 (#1)
9	Hitori Aruki (ひとり歩き, Walking Alone)	1975-03-05 (#4)
10	Shiroi Kaze Yo (白い風よ, White Wind)	1975-05-10 (#9)
11	Jyuushichi no Natsu (十七の夏, Seventeen Summers); Covered by W	1975-06-05 (#2)
12	Tenshi no Kuchibiru (天使のくちびる, Lips of an Angel)	1975-08-25 (#4)
13	Yureteru Watashi (ゆれてる私, Sway Me)	1975-11-25 (#5)
14	Naka Naiwa (泣かないわ, I Won't Cry)	1976-02-25 (#4)
15	Natsu ni go Yōjin (夏にご用心, Beware of the Summer)	1976-05-25 (#2)
16	Ki ga Tsuite yo (気がついてよ, Wake Up)	1976-08-25 (#2)
17	Mō Ichido Dakefuri Muite (もう一度だけふり向いて, Look Back Once)	1976-12-05 (#11)
18	Anata no Subete (あなたのすべて, Your Everything)	1977-02-25 (#6)
19	Kimagure Venus (気まぐれヴィーナス, Whimsical Venus)	1977-05-15 (#7)
20	Mou Modorenai (もう戻れない, There's No Going Back)	1977-09-05 (#8)
21	Shiawase Shibai (しあわせ芝居, Happy Drama)	1977-11-05 (#3)
22	Oikakete Yokohama (追いかけてヨコハマ, Chasing Yokohama)	1978-02-25 (#11)
23	Lipstick (リップスティック)	1978-06-05 (#10)
24	Hatachi ni Nareba (20才になれば, When I Turn 20)	1978-09-05 (#14)
25	Fuyu Iro no Machi (冬色の街, Winter-Coloured Town)	1978-12-25 (#29)
26	Santa Monica no Kaze (サンタモニカの風, Santa Monica Breeze)	1979-02-25 (#24)
27	MISS KISS (-)	1979-05-25 (#25)
28	Party is Over (パーティー・イズ・オーバー)	1979-08-25 (#51)
29	LADY (-)	1979-11-25 (#51)
30	Utsukushii Natsu (美しい夏, Beautiful Summer)	1980-04-21 (#44)
31	Yuugure wa Love Song (夕暮れはラブ・ソング, Twilight Love Song)	1980-07-21 (#65)
32	Kōbe de Aetara (神戸で逢えたら, If We Meet in Kobe)	1980-10-21 (#85)
33	Keshō (化粧, Make-Up)	1981-01-01 (#42)
34	Misty (ミスティー)	1981-06-05 (#53)

=== Studio albums ===
#	Title	Release date
1	Soyokaze No Tenshi (そよ風の天使, Angel Breeze); Debut album	1973-06-25
2	Watashi No Aoi Tori (わたしの青い鳥, My Blue Bird)	1973-09-25
3	Junko To Hana Monogatari (淳子と花物語, Junko's Flower Fairytales)	1974-01-10
4	San Shoku Sumire (三色すみれ, Tricolor Violet)	1973-03-25
5	Jurokusai No Kanjou (16才の感情, Feelings of a Sixteen Year Old)	1974-08-25
6	Spoon Ippai No Shiawase (スプーン一杯の幸せ, Spoonful Of Happiness)	1975-03-25
7	Watashi No Sugao (わたしの素顔, My True Face)	1975-07-05
8	Seishun Zenki (青春前期, Early Youth)	1976-04-05
9	Atsui Kokoro No Shoutaijou (熱い心の招待状, Warm Hearts Invitation)	1976-12-05
10	Love (ラブ)	1977-07-25
11	Shiawase Shibai (しあわせ芝居, Pretending To Be Happy)	1977-12-05
12	Stained Glass (ステンドグラス)	1978-04-25
13	Hatachi Ni Nareba (20才になれば, When You Reach The Age Of 20)	1978-10-25
14	Ai No Romance (愛のロマンス, Love Romance)	1979-03-05
15	Ichimai No He (一枚の絵, Unfinished Painting)	1979-06-01
16	Party Is Over (パーティー・イズ・オーバー)	1979-09-05
17	Anata Kamo Shirenai (あなたかもしれない, You Could Be)	1981-03-05
18	My Dear (-)	1981-11-05
19	Naturally (ナチュラリー)	1983-09-23

=== Live albums ===
#	Title	Release date
1	Jurokusai No Recital (16才のリサイタル, Recital of a Sixteen Year Old)	1974-12-21
2	Viva Seventeen (ビバ・セブンティーン)	1975-12-21
3	Seishun Zanka – Recital 3 (青春讃歌〜リサイタル3, Youth Anthem – 3d Recital)	1976-12-21
4	Junko Recital 4 (淳子リサイタル4, Junko's 4th Recital)	1977-12-21
5	Junko Recital 5 (淳子リサイタル5, Junko's 5th Recital)	1978-12-21
6	Junko Super Live (淳子スーパーライブ)	1979-12-21
7	Shishousetsu (私小説, Romantic)	1980-12-21

=== Greatest hits releases ===
#	Title	Release date
1	Grand Deluxe (グランド・デラックス)	1974-07-05
2	Best Collection '75 (ベストコレクション'75)	1974-12-05
3	Super Deluxe (スーパー・デラックス)	1975-08-05
4	Best Collection '76 (ベストコレクション'76)	1975-11-20
5	Best Hit Album (ベスト・ヒット・アルバム)	1976-10-25
6	Junko (淳子)	1977-06-25
7	Best Hit Album (ベスト・ヒット・アルバム)	1978-06-25
8	Shiawase Shibai/Watashi No Aoi Tori (しあわせ芝居／わたしの青い鳥)	1979-07-01
9	Best Album – My Road (ベストアルバム My Road)	1980-12-05
10	COLEZO! Junko Sakurada – Best (COLEZO! 桜田淳子ベスト)	2005-03-09
11	COLEZO! TWIN Junko Sakurada (COLEZO! TWIN 桜田淳子)	2005-12-16
12	GOLDEN BEST Junko Sakurada (GOLDEN☆BEST 桜田淳子)	2007-07-25
13	GOLDEN BEST – Complete Single Collection (GOLDEN☆BEST コンプリート・シングル・コレクション)	2009-09-16

=== Film ===
- Spoon Ippai no Shiawase (スプーン一杯の幸せ, Spoonful of Happiness) (Shochiku, 1975)
- Otoko wa Tsurai yo Katsushika Risshihen (男はつらいよ 葛飾立志篇) (Toho, 1975)
- Hana no Kō ni Torio – Hatsukoi Jidai (花の高二トリオ・初恋時代) (Shochiku, 1975)
- Isho – Shiroi Shōjo (遺書・白い少女) (Shochiku, 1976)
- Wakai Hito (若い人, Youth) (Toho, 1976)
- Aijō no Sekkei (愛情の設計, Love's Plans) (Shochiku, 1977)
- Ai no Arashi no Naka de (愛の嵐の中で, In the Storm of Love) (Toho, 1978)
- Byōinzaka no Kubikukuri no Ie (病院坂の首縊りの家) (Toho, 1979)
- Dōran (動乱, Turbulence) (Toei, 1980)
- Itazu Kuma (イタズ －熊－) (Toei, 1987)
- Umi e, See You (海へ 〜See you〜, To the Sea 〜See you〜) (Toho, 1988)
- Zennin no Jōken (善人の条件, Good Person's Terms) (Shochiku, 1989)
- Hana no Furu Gogo (花の降る午後, Afternoon When Flowers Fell) (Toho, 1989)
- Aurora no Shita de (オーロラの下で, Beneath the Aurora) (Toei, 1990)
- Shiroi Te (白い手, White Hand) (Toho, 1990)
- Mandara – Wakai Hi no Kōbōdaishi (曼荼羅 若き日の弘法大師, Mandala – Kōbō-Daishi's Youth) (Toho-Towa, 1991)
- Sutoroberi rodo (ストロベリーロード, Strawberry Road) (Toho, 1991)
- Ohikkoshi (お引越し, Moving) (Kadokawa Pictures, 1993)

=== Television ===
- Dokkoi Taisaku (どっこい大作) (TV Asahi, 1973)
- Tentsukuten (てんつくてん) (Nippon Television, 1974)
- Wakai! Sensei (若い!先生, Young! Teacher) (TBS, 1974)
- Tonari no Tonari (となりのとなり, Near to Nearby) (Nippon Television, 1974–1975)
- Akogare Kyōdō Tai (あこがれ共同隊, Aspiring Collaboration Party) (TBS, 1975)
- Edo Professional – Hissatsu Shōbainin (江戸プロフェッショナル・必殺商売人, Edo Professional – Expert Assassin) opening narrator (ABC (of Asahi) and Shochiku, 1978)
- Kataguruma (かたぐるま) (Nippon Television, 1978)
- Ai no Kyōiku (愛の教育, Education in Love) (TBS, 1980)
- Tamanegi Muitara... (玉ねぎむいたら…, Peeling the Onion...) (TBS, 1981)
- Machi: Wakamono-tachi wa Ima (街～若者たちは今, Town: Young People, Now) (NHK, 1982)
- Hara Peko Dōshi (はらぺこ同志, Hara Peko Comrade) (TBS, 1982)
- Mito Kōmon (水戸黄門, Mito Kōmon) (TBS and C.A.L, 1982)
- Gekai Kido Shūhei (外科医 城戸修平, Surgeon Shūhei Kido) (TBS, 1983)
- Ōoku (大奥, Ōoku) (KTV, 1984)
- 25-sai-tachi: Ayaui Yokan (25歳たち～危うい予感, We're 25: Uncertain Premonition)} (NTV, 1984)
- Yurusenai Kekkon (許せない結婚, Disallowed Marriage) (TBS, 1985)
- Kisetsu Hazure no Shinkirō (季節はずれの蜃気楼, Season's End Mirage) (NHK, 1985)
- Miotsukushi (澪つくし) (NHK morning drama, 1985)
- Suiyōbi Drama Special (水曜ドラマスペシャル, Wednesday Drama Special) (TBS Telepack, 1986)
- Dokuganryū Masamune (独眼竜政宗) as Princess Mego, wife of Masamune (NHK Taiga drama, 1987)
- New York Koi Monogatari (ニューヨーク恋物語, New York Love Story) (CX, 1988)
- Ikenaka Genta 80-kiro (池中玄太80キロ, Genta Ikenana, 80km) (NTV, 1989)
- Yonimo Kimyō na Monogatari (世にも奇妙な物語, Strange Tales of the World) (CX, 1990)
- Otoko to Onna no Mystery (男と女のミステリー, The Mystery of Man and Woman) (CX, 1991)
- Yonimo Kimyō na Monogatari (世にも奇妙な物語, Strange Tales of the World) – 8 hours 50 minutes (CX, 1991)
- Kayō Mystery Gekijō (火曜ミステリー劇場, Tuesday Mystery Theatre) (ANB, 1991)
- Izakaya Chōchi (居酒屋兆治) (CX, 1992)
- Waratte Iitomo! (笑っていいとも!, It's Okay to Laugh!) (four appearances)

== Awards and nominations ==
Year	Award	Work	Category	Result
1987	Hochi Film Award	Itazu – Kuma	Best Supporting Actress	Won
1988	Award of the Japanese Academy	Itazu – Kuma	Best Supporting Actress	Nominated
1988	Kinema Junpo Award	Itazu – Kuma	Best Supporting Actress	Won
1990	Award of the Japanese Academy	Hana no furu gogo	Best Supporting Actress	Nominated
1993	Hochi Film Award	Ohikkoshi	Best Supporting Actress	Won
1994	Kinema Junpo Award	Ohikkoshi	Best Supporting Actress	Won
1994	Mainichi Film Concours	Ohikkoshi	Best Supporting Actress	Won

== See also ==
- Kayōkyoku
- List of Unification movement people

Preceded by Megumi Asaoka	Japan Record Award for Best New Artist; 1973	Succeeded by Yōko Aso
