= Sayuri Ishikawa =

Japanese enka singer (born 1958)

Sayuri Ishikawa 石川 さゆり
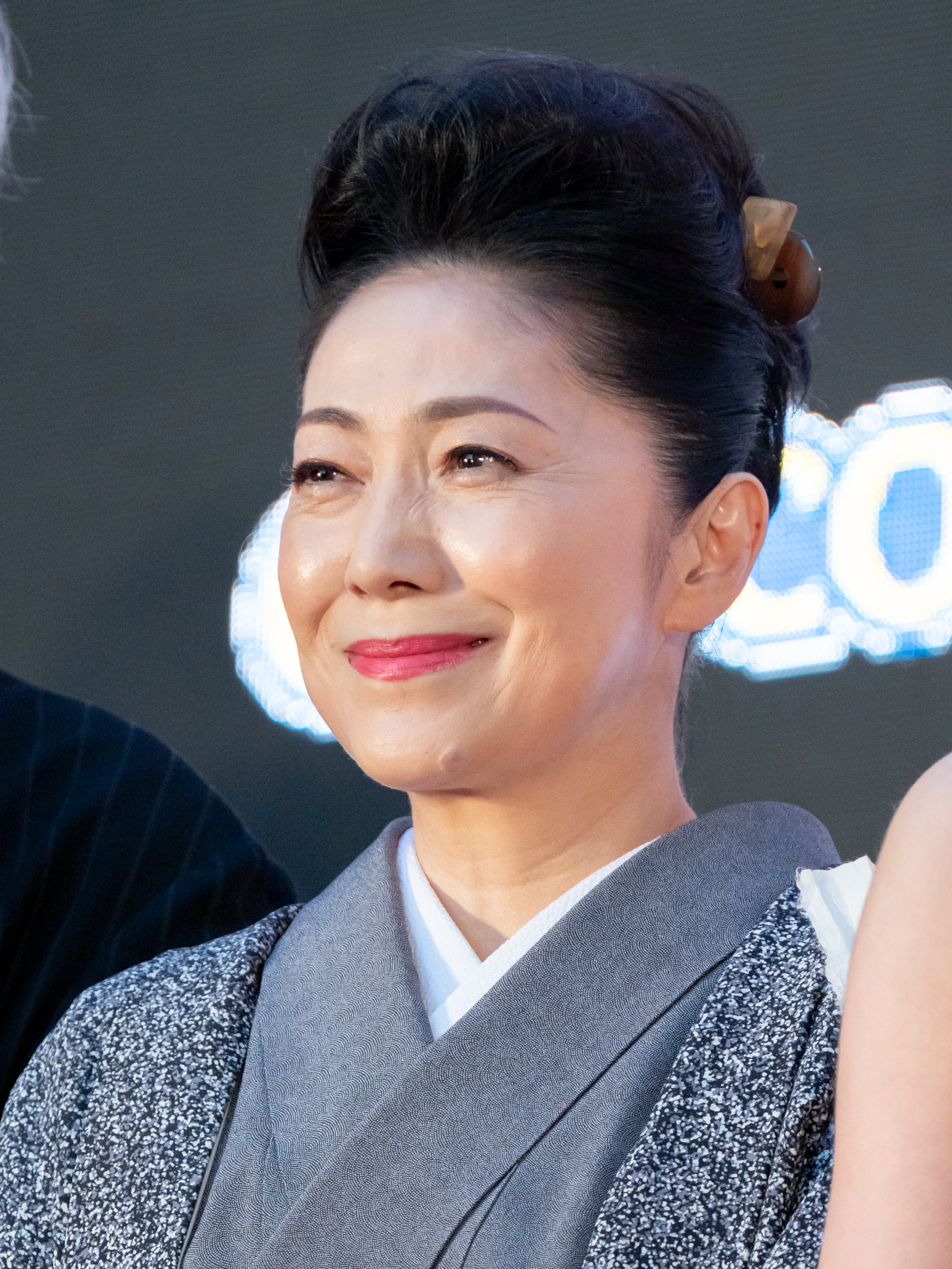
- Ishikawa in 2023

Background information
- Born: Kinuyo Ishikawa (石川 絹代); January 30, 1958 (age 67); Kumamoto, Japan
- Genres: Enka
- Occupation: Singer
- Years active: 1973–present
- Labels: Nippon Columbia (1973–1993); Pony Canyon (1993–1999); Teichiku Records (2000–present)
- Spouse: Kenji Baba (m. 1981–1989)
- Website: Official site

Sayuri Ishikawa (石川 さゆり, Ishikawa Sayuri; born January 30, 1958) is a Japanese enka singer who made her professional debut in 1973. With a career nearing five decades, she is one of the most-recognized and successful enka singers in history.

Ishikawa is a popular contestant on the annual NHK Kōhaku Uta Gassen broadcast. Up till 2017, she has been invited to perform 40 times since 1977, the year she released her biggest hit, "Tsugaru Kaikyo-Fuyugeshiki". To date, she holds the record for the most appearances in the NHK Kōhaku Uta Gassen for a female artist. She has released over 100 albums (including compilation albums (Note: Ishikawa's official website lists only her Teichiku albums.)) and more than 120 singles, of which a few were not enka, but rock and jazz music instead. Another of her biggest hits, "Amagi-goe", which was released in 1986, won her many awards, and many believe that it was this song that made her an icon as an A-list enka singer.

Ishikawa appears in the Wim Wenders film "Perfect Days", which won the Prize of the Ecumenical Jury at the 2023 Cannes Film Festival.

== Early life and career ==
Ishikawa grew up during enka's heyday and went with her mother and grandmother to see Chiyoko Shimakura's performance. "I loved singing," she recalls. Ishikawa won a singing contest in 1972 when she was only 14 years old and released her first single "Kakurenbo" the next year. She finished her high school but didn't go to university, entering show business instead. Her biggest hit, "Tsugaru Kaikyō Fuyugeshiki", was released in 1977.

Major league baseball player Ichiro Suzuki of the Seattle Mariners chose Sayuri Ishikawa's "Amagi-goe" as an at-bat walk-up song in 2008 along with Misia's "Ishin Denshin" and "Royal Chocolate Flush". Ishikawa re-recorded this song with Marty Friedman for Ichiro.

In 2010, Ishikawa released a rare, non-enka single, Baby Baby, a duet with rock singer Tamio Okuda.

In 2015, Ishikawa recorded "Chanto Iwanakya Aisanai", the ending theme of the Lupin the 3rd Part IV anime.

In July 2017, Tokyo Olympics 2020 organizers kicked off the countdown celebration to the Olympics by releasing a promotional theme song along with a summer dance. The song, with which the organizer aimed to promote Japanese summer festivals, is a new version of "Tokyo Gorin Ondo," the theme song for the 1964 Summer Olympics, but with updated lyrics. It is performed by Ishikawa, alongside Yūzō Kayama and Takehara Pistol (ja).

On May 20, 2019, it was announced that Ishikawa would be awarded the 2019 Spring Purple Ribbon Medal of Honours (令和元年春の紫綬褒章) for her accomplishments.

== Personal life ==
Ishikawa married Kenji Baba in 1981, but the couple divorced in 1989. Their daughter, Saori, was born in 1984.

== NHK Kōhaku Uta Gassen appearances ==
Ishikawa's first Kōhaku Uta Gassen appearance was in 1977, four years after her debut and following the hit of her signature song "Tsugaru Kaikyō Fuyugeshiki".

2017 marked her 40th appearance in total, and 36th consecutive year in the ever popular annual event, which is a record for a female artist.

She missed the 34th edition in 1983 as she was heavily pregnant, though she did attend the show and appeared as a guest, cheering the red (female) group.

Year/Kōhaku #	#	Song (Note: ( ) shows times Ishikawa sung the same song at Kōhaku Uta Gassen.)	Appearance Order (Note: Shows Ishikawa's "appearance order/all contestants" at each Kōhaku Uta Gassen.)	Opposite (Note: ( ) shows times Ishikawa sung opposite the same singer.)	Notes (Note: ( ) shows times Ishikawa sung the position (appearance order). Ultimate (last singer of the team, Tori トリ) or penultimate (penultimate singer of the team, Tori-mae トリ前) positions are reserved for established singers.)
1977/28th	1	Tsugaru Kaikyo Fuyugeshiki	19/24	Akira Kobayashi	
1978/29th	2	Hino Kuni e (火の国へ)	3/24	Kariudo (狩人)	
1979/30th	3	Inochi Moyashite (命燃やして)	19/23	Hiroshi Uchiyamada and Cool Five	
1980/31st	4	Kamome to Iu Na no Sakaba (鴎という名の酒場)	17/23	Takashi Hosokawa	
1981/32nd	5	Namida no Yado (なみだの宿)	17/22	Goro Noguchi	
1982/33rd	6	Tsugaru Kaikyō Fuyugeshiki (2)	19/22	Hideo Murata	
1983/34th	–	Guest appearance only	–	-	(Note: Ishikawa was on maternity leave and was excused from appearing as a contestant.)
1984/35th	7	Tokyo Meguri-Ai (東京めぐり愛)	14/20	Gannosuke Ashiya (芦屋雁之助)	
1985/36th	8	Hatoba Shigure (波止場しぐれ)	18/20	Hideo Murata (2)	
1986/37th	9	Amagi-goe	20/20	Shinichi Mori	Ultimate (1)
1987/38th	10	Meoto Zenzai (夫婦善哉)	18/20	Saburo Kitajima	
1988/39th	11	Taki no Shiraito (滝の白糸)	19/21	Hiroshi Itsuki	
1989/40th	12	Kaze no Bon Koiuta (風の盆恋歌)	20/20	Saburo Kitajima (2)	Grand Ultimate (Note: "Grand Ultimate (Ōtori, 大トリ)" means Ishikawa sung after the ultimate singer of the opposite "Shiro-gumi (White team)" and was the last singer of all contestants.) (2)
1990/41st	13	Utakata (うたかた)	28/29	Shinji Tanimura	Penultimate (1)
1991/42nd	14	Minato Uta (港唄)	27/28	Saburo Kitajima (3)	Penultimate (2)
1992/43rd	15	Hotel Minato-ya (ホテル港や)	26/28	Takashi Hosokawa (2)	
1993/44th	16	Tsugaru Kaikyō Fuyugeshiki (3)	26/26	Saburo Kitajima (4)	Ultimate (3)
1994/45th	17	Kiga Kaikyo (飢餓海峡)	24/25	Saburo Kitajima (5)	Penultimate (3)
1995/46th	18	Kita no Nyobo (北の女房)	23/25	Saburo Kitajima (6)	
1996/47th	19	Showa Yume-Tsubame (昭和夢つばめ)	23/25	Takashi Hosokawa (3)	
1997/48th	20	Amagi-goe (2)	23/25	Shinichi Mori (2)	
1998/49th	21	Kaze no Bon Koiuta (風の盆恋歌) (2)	21/25	Takashi Hosokawa (4)	
1999/50th	22	Amagi-goe (3)	25/27	Shinji Tanimura (2)	
2000/51st	23	Tsugaru Kaikyō Fuyugeshiki (4)	25/28	Takashi Hosokawa (5)	
2001/52nd	24	Namida Tsuzuri (涙つづり)	24/27	Takao Horiuchi	
2002/53rd	25	Amagi-goe (4)	27/27	Hiroshi Itsuki (2)	Ultimate (4)
2003/54th	26	Noto Hanto (能登半島)	28/30	Saburo Kitajima (7)	
2004/55th	27	Ichiyo Koiuta (一葉恋歌)	26/28	Kiyoshi Hikawa	
2005/56th	28	Amagi-goe (5)	22/29	Porno Graffitti	
2006/57th	29	Meoto Zenzai (2)	14/27	Shinichi Mori (3)	First half ultimate (Note: "First half ultimate" means Ishikawa was the last singer of the first half of the show, immediately before the half-time NHK News break.)
2007/58th	30	Tsugaru Kaikyō Fuyugeshiki (5)	27/27	Hiroshi Itsuki (3)	Ultimate (5)
2008/59th	31	Amagi-goe (6)	24/26	SMAP	
2009/60th	32	Tsugaru Kaikyō Fuyugeshiki (6)	23/25	Kiyoshi Hikawa (2)	
2010/61st	33	Amagi-goe (7)	20/22	Saburo Kitajima (8)	
2011/62nd	34	Tsugaru Kaikyō Fuyugeshiki (7)	25/25	SMAP(2)	Ultimate (6)
2012/63rd	35	Amagi-goe (8)	24/25	Saburo Kitajima (9)	Penultimate (4)
2013/64th	36	Tsugaru Kaikyō Fuyugeshiki (8)	21/26	Akihiro Miwa	
2014/65th	37	Amagi-goe (9)	20/23	Tsuyoshi Nagabuchi	
2015/66th	38	Tsugaru Kaikyō Fuyugeshiki (9)	20/26	Hiroshi Itsuki (4)	
2016/67th	39	Amagi-goe (10)	23/23	Arashi	Ultimate (7)
2017/68th	40	Tsugaru Kaikyō Fuyugeshiki (10)	22/22	Yuzu	Ultimate (8)
2018/69th	41	Amagi-goe (11)	22/22	Arashi (2)	Ultimate (9)

== Filmography ==
=== Film ===
- Izu no Odoriko (1974), Okimi
- Perfect Days (2023), Mama

=== Television ===
- Kōmyō ga Tsuji (2006), Setsu
- Awaiting Kirin (2020), Maki

== Honors ==
- Medal with Purple Ribbon (2019)
