= Yōsui Inoue discography =

Discography of a Japanese singer-songwriter Yōsui Inoue

== Albums ==
=== Studio albums ===
Year	Album	Chart positions (JP)	Label
1972	Danzetsu (断絶)	8	Polydor Japan
1972	Yōsui Two: Sentimental (陽水II~センチメンタル)	10	Polydor Japan
1973	Kōri no Sekai (氷の世界)	1	Polydor Japan
1974	Nishoku no Koma (二色の独楽)	1	Polydor Japan
1976	Shoutaijou no Nai Show (招待状のないショー)	1	For Life Records
1978	White	3	For Life Records
1979	Sneaker Dancer	3	For Life Records
1980	Every Night	28	For Life Records
1981	Ayashii Yoru wo Matte (あやしい夜をまって)	11	For Life Records
1982	Lion & Pelican (ライオンとペリカン, Raion to Perikan)	13	For Life Records
1983	Ballerina	25	For Life Records
1987	Negative	5	For Life Records
1990	Handsome Boy	2	For Life Records
1992	The Night Without a Guide (ガイドのいない夜, Gaido no Inai Yoru)	7	For Life Records
1993	Under the Sun	1	For Life Records
1994	Eien no Sur (永遠のシュール, Eien no Shūru)	7	For Life Records
1997	Shopping (with Tamio Okuda) (credited to InoueYosuiOkudaTamio)	4	For Life Records
1998	Kudan (九段)	23	For Life Records
2002	Cassis	12	For Life Records
2006	Love Complex	13	For Life Music Entertainment
2007	Double Drive (with Tamio Okuda) (credited to InoueYosuiOkudaTamio)	10	For Life Music Entertainment
2010	Mariyoku	22	For Life Music Entertainment

=== Cover albums ===
Year	Album	Chart positions (JP)	Label
2001	United Cover	2	For Life Records
2015	United Cover 2	16	Universal Music Japan

=== Self-cover albums ===
Year	Album	Chart positions (JP)	Label
1984	9.5 Carats	1	For Life Records
2002	Blue Selection	20	For Life Records

=== Live albums ===
Year	Album	Chart positions (JP)	Label	Notes
1973	Yōsui Live "Modori Michi" (陽水ライヴ もどり道)	2	Polydor Japan	
1976	Tokyo Washington Club (東京ワシントンクラブ)	8	For Life	Released on LP and cassette only
1982	Yōsui Live "Jealousy"	48	For Life	Released on cassette only
1986	Clam Chowder	6	For Life	
1986	Stardust Rendez-vous: Live at Jingū	3	For Life/Kitty	Recorded with Anzen Chitai
2014	Koori no Sekai Tour 2014 Live The Best (氷の世界ツアー2014 ライブ・ザ・ベスト)	-	Universal Music Japan	

=== Charting compilation albums ===
This is the list of the compilations by Yōsui Inoue that entered on the Oricon Weekly Albums (LP, audio cassette, and CD) Charts. Aside from the following releases, multiple compilation albums has come out to date.

Year	Album	Chart positions (JP)	Label	Notes
1975	Good Pages	1	Polydor Japan	Issued on LP only
1975	Best Pages	1	Polydor Japan	Issued on cassette only
1976	Good Pages 2	24	Polydor Japan	Issued on LP only
1978	Your Sweet Yosui (ユア・スイート陽水)	63	For Life	Issued on LP only
1982	So	53	For Life	Issued on LP and cassette
1982	Much	50	For Life	Issued on LP and cassette
1984	A-Sides Collection (A面コレクション, A-men Korekushon)	64	For Life	Issued on cassette only
1985	Myoujou (明星)	30	Polydor Japan	
1985	Heibon (平凡)	12	For Life	Including previously unreleased material
1987	A-Sides Collection (A面コレクション, A-men Korekushon) [Version II]	27	For Life	Issued on cassette only
1987	Re-View	8	For Life	Issued on CD only
1997	Best Collection	81	Polydor Japan	
1999	Golden Best	1	For Life	Expanded edition had a limited release in 2003
2000	Golden Bad	38	For Life	
2003	Platinum Best: Early Times	65	For Life	
2008	Best Ballade	10	For Life	Including previously unreleased material

=== Other albums ===
Year	Album	Chart positions (JP)	Label	Notes
1975	Yōsui Seitan (陽水生誕)	6	Kaleidoscope	A half bootleg compilation came out without the artist's permission and went out of print shortly after its release; Comprising the unreleased recordings
2008	Hikigatari Passion (弾き語りパッション)	13	For Life	Compilation comprising the unreleased live recordings
2014	Utada Hikaru no Uta (宇多田ヒカルのうた－13組の音楽家による13の解釈について－)	5	Universal Music	Sakura Drops

== Singles ==
Year	A-Side	B-Side(s) / Double A-Side	Chart positions (JP)	Label	Notes ?|"Gomen (御免)"
1969	"Candre Mandre (カンドレ・マンドレ)"	"Endless is Endless (終りがないのは, Owari ga Nai no wa)"	—	CBS Sony	credited to Andre Candre
1969	"Beautiful Wonderful Birds (ビューティフル・ワンダフル・バーズ)"	"In the Dark (闇の中で, Yami no Naka de)"	—	CBS Sony	credited to Andre Candre
1970	"Let Our Hearts Be (花にさえ、鳥にさえ)"	"Quiet Morning (さあ、おぬぎ, Sā, Onugi)"	—	CBS Sony	credited to Andre Candre
1972	"Jinsei ga Nido Areba (人生が二度あれば)"	"Danzetsu (断絶)"	—	Polydor	Reissued in 1989
1972	"Kasa ga Nai (傘がない)"	"Kansha Shirazu no On'na (感謝知らずの女)"	69	Polydor	
1973	"Yume no Naka e (夢の中へ)"	"Itsunomanika Shoujo wa (いつのまにか少女は)"	19	Polydor	Reissued in 1989
1973	"Kokoro Moyou (心もよう)"	"Kaerenai Futari (帰れない二人)"	7	Polydor	Reissued in 1989
1974	"Yamiyo no Kuni kara (闇夜の国から)"	"Itsumo to Chigatta Natsu (いつもと違った春)"	11	Polydor	
1974	"Yūdachi (夕立)"	"Zenmai Jikake no Kabutomushi (ゼンマイじかけのカブト虫)"	15	Polydor	
1975	"Gomen (御免)"	"Tabi kara Tabi (旅から旅)"	29	Polydor	
1975	"Aozora, Hitorikiri (青空、ひとりきり)"	"Flight"	8	For Life	
1976	"Good, Good-Bye"	"Kodomo e no Uta (子供への唄)"	13	For Life	
1977	"Natsu Ganbou (夏願望)"	"Aozora, Hitorikiri (青空、ひとりきり)" "Shoutaijou no Nai Show (招待状のないショー)" "Kodomo e no Uta (子供への唄)"	—	For Life	
1978	"Aoi Yami no Keikoku (青い闇の警告)"	"Eiga ni Ikou (映画に行こう)"	100	For Life	
1978	"Miss Contest"	"Hachigatsu no Kyūka (八月の休暇)" [Single Ver.]	—	For Life	
1979	"Nazeka Shanghai (なぜか上海)"	"Musume ga Nejireru Toki (娘がねじれる時)"	87	For Life	
1980	"Bright Eyes"	"Kotae wa Understand (答えはUNDERSTAND)"	—	For Life	
1980	"Crazy Love"	"Sora wa Blue Angel (空はブルーエンジェル)" "Kotae wa Understand (答えはUNDERSTAND)" (1999 Reissue)	—	For Life	Reissued in 1999
1981	"Jealousy (ジェラシー)"	"Natsu Hoshi Kuzu (夏星屑)"	14	For Life	Reissued in 1988
1981	"Kaze no Elegy (風のエレジー)"	"Umi wa Douda (海はどうだ)"	55	For Life	
1982	"Riverside Hotel (リバーサイド ホテル)"	"Ore no Jimusho wa Camp (俺の事務所はCAMP)"	11	For Life	Reissued in 1988
1982	"Tomadou Pelican (とまどうペリカン)"	"Music High"	69	For Life	
1983	"Aisarete Bakari Iru to (愛されてばかりいると)" [Single Ver.]	"Senaka Made 45-fun (背中まで45分)"	35	For Life	
1983	"Yūwaku (誘惑)" [Single Edit]	"Frozen Eyes"	—	For Life	
1984	"Kanashiki Koibito (悲しき恋人)"	"Dance no Chance (ダンスのチャンス)"	—	For Life	
1984	"Isso Serenade (いっそセレナーデ)"	"Speedy Night"	4	For Life	Reissued in 1988
1986	"Atarashii Rhapsody (新しいラプソディー)"	"Dame na Melon (ダメなメロン)"	25	For Life	Reissued in 1996 and 2007
1986	"Natsu no Owari no Harmony (夏の終わりのハーモニー)"	"Ore wa Shout! (俺はシャウト!)"	6	Kitty	with Anzen Chitai
1987	"Why"	"Yureru Hanazono (揺れる花園)"	63	For Life	
1988	"Kon'ya Watashi ni (今夜、私に)"	"Koi wa Jibun Katte ni (恋は自分勝手に)"	43	For Life	
1989	"Yume Ne Mi (夢寝見)"	"Beni Suberi (紅すべり)"	37	For Life	
1989	"Saigo no News (最後のニュース)"	"Back Side"	57	For Life	
1990	"Shounen Jidai (少年時代)"	"Ara Washi no Uta (荒ワシの歌)"	4	For Life	RIAJ Certification: 4× Platinum
1991	"Tokyo"	"Yume no Senaka (夢の背中)"	76	For Life	
1992	"Musubi Kotoba (結詞)" [New Recording]	"No-Ichigo (野イチゴ)" [New Recording]	33	For Life	
1993	"Gogatsu no Wakare (5月の別れ)"	"Be-Pop Juggler"	27	For Life	RIAJ Certification: Gold
1993	"Make-up Shadow"	"Present"	2	For Life	RIAJ Certification: 3× Platinum; Reissued in 2006
1993	"Canadian Accordion"	"Hikiage Mono no Uta (引き揚げ者の唄)"	35	For Life	
1994	"Ai wa Kimi (愛は君)"	"Akogare (断絶)"	45	Polydor	
1994	"Idou Denwa (移動電話)"	"Kaminari to Kaze (カミナリと風)"	36	For Life	
1995	"Usotsuki Diamonds (嘘つきダイアモンド)"	"Over Time"	32	For Life	
1997	"Arigatou (ありがとう)"	"Wabisuke (侘び助)" [Outtake]	10	For Life; Sony	with Tamio Okuda(credited to InoueYōsuiOkudaTamio)
1998	"Teenager"	"Tsumini no Nai Fune (積み荷のない船)" "Hawaiian Love Song"	60	For Life	
2001	"Coffee Rumba"	"Hoshi no Flamenco (星のフラメンコ)" "Domino" "Tabibito yo (旅人よ)"	19	For Life	RIAJ Certification: Gold
2001	"Hana no Kubikazari (花の首飾り)"	"Oyome ni Oide (お嫁においで)"	12	For Life	RIAJ Certification: Gold
2001	"Kono Yo no Sadame (この世の定め)"	"Kegani (毛ガニ)" "Kyoto Tabemono Jijou (京都食べ物事情)"	60	For Life	
2002	"Final Love Song"	"Yagi no Milk (ヤギのミルク)"	43	For Life	
2002	"Mori Hana Shojo Rin (森花処女林)"	"Kimerareta Rhythm (決められたリズム)" [Single Ver.]	—	For Life	
2002	"Kazari ja Nai no yo Namida wa (飾りじゃないのよ涙は)" [New Recording]	"Kimerareta Rhythm (決められたリズム)" [Album Ver.]	93	For Life	
2005	"Ai wo Utaou (愛を謳おう)"	"Oshiete Jīji (教えてジイジ)"	65	Universal	with Kiyoshirō Imawano
2006	"Atarashii Koi (新しい恋)"	"Nagai Neko (長い猫)"	50	For Life	
2006	"Parallel Love"	"Christmas Vanilla Shake"	9	For Life; Sony	with Tamio Okuda(credited to InoueYōsuiOkudaTamio)
2009	"Love Rainbow"	"Love Lila"	62	For Life	
2017	"Yume no Naka e" (夢の中へ)		36	Universal	
2018	"Care"	Music Play	99	Universal	

In the history of Japanese Oricon weekly singles chart, Yōsui Inoue has produced 41 charting singles with sales of 4.8 million copies in total. 15 of them has sold more than 100,000 copies; "Yume no Naka e", "Kokoro Moyou", "Yamiyo no Kuni kara", "Yūdachi", "Aozora, Hitorikiri", "Good, Good-Bye", "Jealousy", "Riverside Hotel", "Isso Serenade", "Natsu no Owari no Harmony", "Shounen Jidai", "Make-up Shadow", "Arigatou", "Coffee Rumba", and "Hana no Kubikazari".
