= Bitter and Sweet (Akina Nakamori album) =

Studio album by Akina Nakamori
- Released: 3 April 1985
- Recorded: 1984−1985
- Studios: Sound Inn Studio; Sedic Studio; Freedom Studio; Hitokuchizaka Studio; Aoi Studio; Cherry Island Studio
- Genre: Pop
- Length: 43:54
- Language: Japanese
- Label: Warner Pioneer
- Producer: Yuuzou Shimada

Akina Nakamori chronology
| Silent Love (1984) | Bitter and Sweet (1985) | D404ME (1985) |

Singles from Bitter and Sweet
- 1. "Kazari ja Nai no yo Namida wa" Released: 14 November 1984

Bitter and Sweet is the seventh studio album by Japanese singer Akina Nakamori. It was released on 3 April 1985 under the Warner Pioneer label. The album includes a renewed version of the No. 1 single "Kazari ja Nai no yo Namida wa".

== Background ==
Bitter and Sweet came half a year after her previous studio album, "Possibility".

The music production team consisted of various semi-popular artists of the time frame, such as EPO, Toshiki Kadomatsu, Yousui Inoue, Akira Jimbo, Minako Yoshida and Aska (from the duo Chage and Aska).

Yokan took on a new arrangement and was included on the mini studio album My Best Thanks. The original version's final melody slowly fades away while in the mini studio version includes the sound of noise to follow final track from the mini album. In 1995 it was arranged for a lone piano, recorded for Nakamori's true album akina 95 best, in which she essentially covered herself.

With this album, Nakamori changes not just her visual appearance, but also her musical style from the stereotypical idol-Kayōkyoku into Pop and Synth-pop. It's also her final effort to be produced by Yuuzou Shimada.

== Promotion ==
=== Single ===
It consists of one previously released single, Kazari ja Nai no yo Namida wa. The single has received the musical award in the 14th FNS Music Festival in 1984. The album version has subtitle New Re-mix version and includes renewed arrangement. The intro begins with the solo of bass guitar, while the original version starts with the whole instrumental session part. The original version of Kazarijanai yo Namida wa was included in the second compilation album "Best" in 1986.

On 1 May 1985, on Nakamori's third debut anniversary was released original demo of the Meu Amore, Akaitori ga Nigeta as a A-side track and album track Babylon was recorded as a B-side song. Babylon has received a new remix version with the extension of two minutes, in the compare with the original.

== Stage performances ==
On the Fuji TV music television program Yoru no Hit Studio, she performed original version of "Kazari ja Nai no yo Namida wa" and "Koibito no Iru Jikan".

On NHK music television program Young Studio 101, she performed together at once Dreaming and Yokan.

Babylon, So Long, Yokan, Romantic na Yoru dawa, Koibito no Iru Jikan, Unsteady Love, April Stars and Dreaming were performed in Nakamori's live tour Bitter and Sweet in 1985.

Nakamori reprised the performance of Babylon in the live tour A Hundred Days in 1987 and Femme Fatale in 1988.

Among of all album tracks, the Yokan has been performed the most times: in 1993, she performed it in one-night special live event Utahime Live at Parco Threatre, in 1995 special live true akina best 1995, she performed version with the piano arrangement, five years later in 2000 she performed it in live tour 21 Seiki he no Tabidachi and in 2003 it was in her live tour I hope so.

== Chart performance ==
The album reached number 1 on the Oricon Album Weekly Charts for two consecutive weeks. LP Record version charted 22 weeks, Cassette tape version debuted on number 1 as well and charted 24 weeks and sold over 573,700 copies. The album remained at number 9 on the Oricon Album Yearly Charts in 1985.

== Track listing ==
| No. | Title | Lyrics | Music | Arranger(s) | Length |
|---|---|---|---|---|---|
| 1. | "Kazari ja Nai no yo Namida wa" (album version) | Yōsui Inoue | Inoue | Mitsuo Hagita | 4:41 |
| 2. | "Romantic na Yoru dawa" | EPO | EPO | Noboyuki Shimizu | 3:43 |
| 3. | "Yokan" | Aska | Aska | Kazuo Shiina | 4:07 |
| 4. | "Tsukiyo Venus" | Gorō Matsui | Naoya Matsuoka | Matsuoka | 3:39 |
| 5. | "Babylon" | Sandii | Makoto Kubota | Akira Inoue | 4:41 |
| 6. | "Unsteady Love" | Toshiki Kadomatsu | Kadomatsu | Kadomatsu | 4:35 |
| 7. | "Dreaming" | Nobu Saitou | Yoshiko | Akaguy | 4:35 |
| 8. | "Koibito no iru Jikan" | Show | Akira Jimbo | Inoue | 3:57 |
| 9. | "So Long" | Kadomatsu | Kadomatsu | Kadomatsu | 5:02 |
| 10. | "April Stars" | Minako Yoshida | Yoshida | Shiina | 5:05 |

2023 remaster issue
| No. | Title | Lyrics | Music | Arranger(s) | Length |
|---|---|---|---|---|---|
| 11. | "Kazari ja Nai no yo Namida wa" (single version) | Inoue | Inoue | Hagita | 4:10 |
| 12. | "Moonlight Letter" | Goro Matsui | Inoue | Hagita | 4:26 |

Notes:

- All English titles are stylized in all uppercase.

== Covers ==
=== Kazari ja Nai no yo Namida wa ===
- Yousui Inoue, original composer of the song covered on his cover album 9.5 Carats in 1984.
- Yasuko Naitō covered the song on her 1988 cover album Songs II.
- The Nolans covered the song in English as "Tears" on their 1991 cover album Tidal Wave (Samishii Nettaigyo).
- Fukuyama Engineering Golden Oldies Band covered the song on their 2002 cove album The Golden Oldies.
- Shuichi "Ponta" Murakami featuring Kōji Kikkawa covered the song on the 2003 album My Pleasure: Featuring Greatest Musicians.
- Aya Shimazu covered the song on her 2005 album BS Nippon no Uta III.
- Hiromi Iwasaki covered the song on her 2008 cover album Dear Friends IV.
- Tokiko Kato covered the song on her 2008 cover album Songs: Uta ga Machi ni Nagareteita.
- GO!GO!7188 covered the song on their 2008 cover album Doranoana 2.
- Chage (with Aya Matsuura and Tairiku Sada) covered the song on his 2009 album Many Happy Returns.
- Yōko Kon covered the song on her 2013 album Konjaku Uta: Pinky to Otoko Uta.
- Megumi Mori covered the song on her 2013 cover album Re:Make1.
- Penicillin covered the song as the B-side of their 2013 single "Gensō Catharsis".
- Lisa Ono covered the song on her 2014 album Japao 3.
- Juju covered the song as the B-side of her 2015 single "What You Want".
- King Gnu covered the song on the 2019 various artists album Yōsui Inoue Tribute.
- Shō Kiryūin covered the song on his 2020 cover album Utatte Kiririnpa.
- Ms. Ooja covered the song on her 2022 cover album Nagashi Ooja 2: Vintage Song Covers.
- Hiroji Miyamoto covered the song on his 2022 cover album "Aki no Hi ni".
- Ado covered the song on her 2023 cover album Ado’s Utattemita Album.

=== Yokan ===
- Japanese singer Aska from rock band Chage and Aska, covered Yokan in his second solo album Scene II in 1988.

=== Unsteady Love ===
- Japanese composer and singer, Toshiki Kadomatsu covered "Unsteady Love" on his studio album Gentle Sex in 2000.

== Release history ==
| Year | Format(s) | Serial number | Label(s) | Ref. |
|---|---|---|---|---|
| 1985 | LP, CT, CD | L-12593, LKF-8093, 32XL-61 | Warner Pioneer | |
| 1991 | CD | WPCL-417 | Warner Pioneer | |
| 1996 | CD | WPC6-8188 | Warner Pioneer | |
| 2006 | CD, digital download | WPCL-10283 | Warner Pioneer | |
| 2012 | Super Audio CD, CD hybrid | WPCL-11141 | Warner Pioneer | |
| 2014 | CD | WPCL-11728 | Warner Pioneer | |
| 2018 | LP | WPJL-10090 | Warner Pioneer | |
| 2023 | 2CD | WPCL-13449/50 | Warner Pioneer | |

Notes:

- 2006 re-release includes 24-bit digitally remastered sound source
- 2012 and 2014 re-release includes subtitles in the tracks "2012 remaster"
- 2023 re-release includes lacquer remaster which includes subtitles in the tracks "2023 lacquer remaster" along with original karaoke version of the tracks

== See also ==
- 1985 in Japanese music
