= Golden Best (Yōsui Inoue album) =

Greatest hits album by Yōsui Inoue
- Released: July 28, 1999
- Recorded: 1972–1998; 2001–2003 (Bonus disc)
- Genre: Folk, rock, kayokyoku, pop
- Length: 74:43 (disc one); 78:23 (disc two)
- Label: For Life
- Producer: Various

Yōsui Inoue chronology
Kudan (1998)	Golden Best (1999)	Golden Bad (2000)

Alternative cover
- cover of a 2003 expanded edition entitled Golden Best Super

Golden Best is the double-CD compilation album by Japanese singer-songwriter Yōsui Inoue. The album was released in July 1999, celebrating his 30-year career as a solo recording artist. It comprises 35 tracks spanning his works after 1972; the year he released his debut album Danzetsu under the renewed stage name.

Golden Best debuted at the number-six on the Japanese Oricon chart and climbed the top in September 1999. It became one of the most successful albums for Inoue, entering the record chart for a year with sales of over 1.4 million copies. The label For Life Music Entertainment stated that Golden Best album has sold more than 2.06 million copies up to late 2008.

After a year from the album's release, a sequel entitled Golden Bad came out. And in 2003, when the album shipped more than 2 million units, an expanded edition called Golden Best Super was issued. It features bonus disc which includes his singles in the 2000s and previously unreleased recordings.

== Track listing ==
All songs written and composed by Yōsui Inoue, unless otherwise indicated

=== Disc one ===
1. "Shounen Jidai (少年時代)" (Inoue, Natsumi Hirai) – 3:21
2. "Arigatou (ありがとう)" (Inoue, Tamio Okuda) (recorded with Tamio Okuda, credited to InoueYōsuiOkudaTamio) – 3:31
3. "Make-up Shadow" (Inoue, Utsuru Ayame) – 4:09
4. "Asia no Junshin (アジアの純真)" (Inoue, Okuda) (recorded with Tamio Okuda, credited to InoueYōsuiOkudaTamio) – 3:53
5. "Saigo no News (最後のニュース)" – 3:55
6. "Kasa ga Nai (傘がない)" – 5:35
7. "Kōri no Sekai (氷の世界)" – 4:11
8. "Yume no Naka e (夢の中へ)" – 2:40
9. "Riverside Hotel" – 3:54
10. "Kokoro Moyou (心もよう)" – 3:27
11. "Gogatsu no Wakare (5月の別れ)" – 5:06
12. "Isso Serenade (いっそ セレナーデ)" – 3:16
13. "Crazy Love" – 4:04
14. "Kazari ja Nai no yo Namida wa (飾りじゃないのよ涙は)" – 4:43
15. "Jealousy (ジェラシー)" – 4:01
16. "Aozora, Hitorikiri (青空、ひとりきり)" – 4:22
17. "Atarashii Rhapsody (新しいラプソディー)" – 4:51
18. "Nagai Saka no E no Frame (長い坂の絵のフレーム)" – 5:52

=== Disc two ===
1. "Tomadou Pelican (とまどうペリカン)" – 4:52
2. "Canary (カナリア)" – 3:56
3. "Dance wa Umaku Odorenai (ダンスはうまく踊れない)" – 3:56
4. "Musume ga Nejireru Toki (娘がねじれる時)" – 4:13
5. "Nazeka Shanghai (なぜか上海)" – 5:32
6. "Eiyū (英雄)" – 5:04
7. "Wakan'nai (ワカンナイ)" – 4:59
8. "Wine Red no Kokoro (ワインレッドの心)" (Inoue, Kōji Tamaki) – 5:25
9. "Natsu no Owari no Harmony (夏の終わりのハーモニー)" (Inoue, Tamaki) (recorded with Anzen Chitai) – 3:53
10. "Teenager" (Inoue, Hirai) – 4:34
11. "Tokyo" (Inoue, Hirai) – 2:58
12. "Thailand Fantasia (タイランド ファンタジア)" – 4:55
13. "Kaerenai Futari (帰れない二人)" (Inoue, Kiyoshiro Imawano) – 4:21
14. "Just Fit" – 4:25
15. "Jinsei ga Nido Areba (人生が二度あれば)" – 4:59
16. "Musubikotoba (結詞)" – 4:07
17. "Tsumini no Nai Fune (積み荷のない船)" – 5:38

=== Bonus disc for 2003 limited edition ===
1. "Tomadou Pelican (とまどうペリカン)" [Live version recorded at the Tokyo International Forum on March 21, 2003, previously unreleased] – 5:07
2. "Coffee Rumba (コーヒー・ルンバ)" (Jose Manzo Perroni, Seiji Nakazawa) – 3:07
3. "Hana no Kubikazari (花の首飾り)" (Koichi Sugiyama, Fusako Sugawara, Rei Nakanishi) – 4:11
4. "Aozora, Hitorikiri (青空、ひとりきり)" [Live version recorded at the Pacifico Yokohama on December 23, 2002, previously unreleased] – 3:31
5. "Kimerareta Rhythm (決められたリズム)" – 4:12
6. "Mis Cast" [Live version recorded at the Tokyo International Forum on March 21, 2003, previously unreleased] – 5:10
7. "L-O-V-E" [Live version recorded at the Fukuoka Convention Center on January 21, 2003, previously unreleased] – 2:58
8. "Miss Contest" [Live version recorded at the Bluenote Tokyo on January 6, 2003, previously unreleased] – 4:38
9. "Kōri no Sekai (氷の世界)" [Live version recorded at the Tokyo International Forum on March 21, 2003, previously unreleased] – 5:07
10. "Umi e Kinasai (海へ来なさい)" (Inoue, Katz Hoshi) [Live version recorded at the Tokyo International Forum on March 21, 2003, previously unreleased] – 4:32

== Chart positions ==
Year	Album	Chart	Position	Sales
1999–2000	Golden Best	Japanese Oricon Weekly Albums Chart (top 100)	1	1,418,000+
2003	Golden Best Super	Japanese Oricon Weekly Albums Chart (top 300)	28	31,000

== Certification ==
Region	Certification	Certified units/sales
Japan (RIAJ)	4× Platinum	1,600,000^{^}
^{^} Shipments figures based on certification alone.

== Release history ==
Country	Date	Label	Format	Catalog number	Notes
Japan	July 28, 1999	For Life Records	CD	FLCF-3761	
Japan	June 25, 2003	For Life Music Entertainment	CD	FLCF-3965	Expanded edition with bonus disc, limited release
