= Bitter and Sweet =

Bitter and Sweet may refer to:

- Bitter & Sweet (album), a 2009 album by Beni
- Bitter and Sweet (Akina Nakamori album), 1985 album by Japanese singer Akina Nakamori
- "Bitter & Sweet", single by Roger Whittaker
- "Bitter & Sweet" (song), a song by Rythem
