= Negative (Yōsui Inoue album) =

Studio album by Yōsui Inoue
- Released: December 16, 1987
- Genre: Rock
- Label: For Life

Yōsui Inoue chronology
9.5 Carats (1984)	Negative (1987)	Handsome Boy (1990)

Negative is the 13th studio album by a Japanese singer-songwriter Yōsui Inoue, released in December 1987.

== Track listing ==
All songs written and composed by Yōsui Inoue

=== Side one ===
1. "Negative" – 3:46
2. "Moon" – 3:14
3. "Koi Kogarete (恋こがれて)" – 2:59
4. "Yureru Hanazono (揺れる花園)" – 4:26
5. "Kioku (記憶)" – 5:41

=== Side two ===
1. "Seventeen" – 3:25
2. "Zenbu Go (全部GO)" – 3:52
3. "We are Uo (We are 魚)" – 3:33
4. "Why" – 5:32
5. "Love You" – 2:51

== Personnel ==
- Shūichi "Ponta" Murakami – Drums
- Yūji Tanaka – Drums
- Kenji Takamizu – Bass
- Chiharu Mikuzuki – Bass
- Haruyoshi Rokudo – Bass
- Kenji Ōmura – Guitar
- Yutaka Takesawa – Guitar
- Wataru Yahagi – Guitar
- Nobuyuki Shimizu – Guitar, synthesizer
- Yasuharu Nakanishi – Keyboards
- Yūji Kawashima – Keyboards, synthesizer
- Takeshi Kobayashi – Synthesizer
- Eiji Mori – Synthesizer
- Motoya Hamaguchi – Percussion
- Katō Strings – Strings
- Aska Strings – Strings
- Seri Ishikawa – Chorus
- Yōsui Inoue – Lead and backing vocals, guitar

== Chart positions ==
Year	Chart	Position	Sales
1987–88	Japanese Oricon Weekly Albums Chart (Top 100)	5	173,000+
