= Handsome Boy =

Handsome Boy may refer to:

- A fictional modeling boy in the Pakistan - Abdullah solangi Get a Life.
- Handsome Boy, an album by Japanese singer-songwriter Yosui Inoue, released in 1990
- Handsome Boy Records, a Canadian independent record label in the 1990s
- Handsome Boy Modeling School, a musical project consisting of hip-hop producers Prince Paul and Dan the Automator
