= 9.5 Carats =

Studio album by Yōsui Inoue
- Released: December 21, 1984
- Genres: Folk rock, kayokyoku
- Length: 39:49
- Label: For Life
- Producer: Yōsui Inoue

Yōsui Inoue chronology
Ballerina (1983)	9.5 Carats (1984)	Myoujou (1985)

9.5 Carats (9.5カラット, 9.5 Karatto) is the 12th studio album by a Japanese singer-songwriter Yosui Inoue, released in December 1984. It mostly features cover versions of the songs that Inoue wrote for other performers, except "Isso Serenade" which was released as a lead single in October 1984. It is the most commercially successful album for him, its sales are estimated to be 1.1-1.8 million copies.

== Album overview ==
=== Songs information ===
In addition to "Isso Serenade" which became Inoue's third top-ten hit single as a singer, 9.5 Carats also includes his own rendition of four of his successful compositions around the early 1980s. One of them, "Wine Red no Kokoro" was originally recorded by Inoue's former backing band Anzen Chitai and co-written by the group's frontman Koji Tamaki. A song that Inoue contributed the lyrics was released as a single in 1983, and topped the Japanese Oricon chart in the following year. The band rose to fame owing to the hit of "Wine Red no Kokoro", and the song itself won the 26th Japan Record Award for "Gold Prize". It has been one of the signature songs for both Inoue and Anzen Chitai, and recorded by the multiple artists including Mariko Takahashi, Junko Ohashi, Naoko Ken, Kiyotaka Sugiyama, Mucc, Megumi Ogata, Park Yong-ha, and the song's composer himself (on his 1999 same-titled album). Inoue also wrote the lyrics for some of the group's successful follow-ups to "Wine Red no Kokoro", including "Koi no Yokan" which reached the #2 on the chart in autumn 1984. Also in the same year, he composed the song "Kazari ja Nai no yo Namida wa" for a pop icon Akina Nakamori who was at the pinnacle of popularity at the time. Nakamori's version was issued as a single in November 1984 and topped the chart, becoming one of her biggest hit singles with sales of over 620,000 copies. Nakamori remade the song for several times in later years, and also covered two of other Inoue's compositions on 9.5 Carats album ("Koi no Yokan" and "Dance wa Umaku Odorenai"). Before Inoue married to a singer Seri Ishikawa in 1978, he contributed some songs for her 1977 album Amagumo. One of them "Dance wa Umaku Odorenai" was not successful at the time, but the song was widely recognized because of cover version by an actress Mio Takaki. It was featured on the TV drama Kako no Nai On-na Tachi and became a hit, peaking at #3 on the chart in 1982. Like "Winered no Kokoro", "Dance wa Umaku Odorenai" has been covered by several other singers, including Naoko Ken and Hideaki Tokunaga.

=== Reception ===
9.5 Carats gained commercial success immediately upon its release, becoming his first chart-topper since 1976 Shoutaijou no Nai Show and most massively successful LP after his breakthrough album Kōri no Sekai issued in 1973. The album debuted at the summit of the Japanese Oricon chart, and stayed there for 9 weeks consecutively. It sold in excess of 1.1 million copies while the album was entering the chart, and eventually became the 1985's biggest selling album in Japan. In the history of the Japanese music industry, it is also one of the best-selling albums by male solo artist during the 1980s, along with Akira Terao's Reflections (released in 1981 and sold over 1.6 million copies to date), Eiichi Otaki's A Long Vacation (released in 1981 and retailed approximately 1.08 million copies) and Michael Jackson's Thriller (released in 1982 and estimated to be selling between 1.7 and 2.5 million units so far).

== Track listing ==
Side one
No.	Title	Writer(s)	Original performer	Length
1.	"Harbour Lights (はーばーらいと, Hābāraito)" (arranged by Katz Hoshi)	Yosui Inoue, Takashi Matsumoto	Yutaka Mizutani	4:38
2.	"Dance wa Umaku Odorenai (ダンスはうまく踊れない)" (arranged by Joe Hisaishi)	Inoue	Seri Ishikawa	4:29
3.	"Transit" (arranged by Katz Hoshi)	Inoue, Yumi Matsutoya	Asami Kobayashi	4:19
4.	"A-B-C-D" (arranged by Katz Hoshi)	Inoue	Kenji Sawada	4:23
5.	"Koi no Yokan (恋の予感)" (arranged by Mitsuo Hagita)	Inoue, Koji Tamaki	Anzen Chitai	4:18

Side two
No.	Title	Writer(s)	Original performer	Length
1.	"Isso Serenade (いっそ セレナーデ)" (arranged by Katz Hoshi)	Inoue	(original composition)	3:13
2.	"Kazari ja Nai no yo Namida wa (飾りじゃないのよ 涙は)" (arranged by Joe Hisaishi)	Inoue	Akina Nakamori	4:38
3.	"Karatachi no Hana (からたちの花)" (arranged by Katz Hoshi)	Inoue, Inutaroh Nagareboshi	Kanako Higuchi	4:28
4.	"Wine Red no Kokoro (ワインレッドの心, Wain reddo no Kokoro)" (arranged by Mitsuo Hagita)	Inoue, Tamaki	Anzen Chitai	5:23

== Personnel ==
The following session musicians were credited in the liner notes for box-set No Selection, released in 1991.

- Yosui Inoue - vocals
- Yutaka Uehara - drums
- Takayuki Hijikata - guitar
- Ken Yajima - guitar
- Yutaka Takezawa - guitar
- Fujimal Yoshino - guitar
- Yūji Nakamura - bass guitar
- Kenji Takamizu - bass guitar
- Yasuharu Nakanishi - keyboards
- Jun Satou - keyboards
- Joe Hisaishi - synthesizer
- Hidefumi Toki - synthesizer
- Yūji Kawashima - synthesizer
- Masatsugu Shinozaki - violin
- Ohno Group - strings
- Katou Strings - strings

== Charts ==
=== Weekly charts ===
Chart	Position	Sales
Japanese Oricon Albums Chart (LP)	1	1.14 million+
Japanese Oricon Albums Chart (CT)	1	1.14 million+
Japanese Oricon Albums Chart (CD)	29	1.14 million+

=== Year-end charts ===
Chart (1985)	Position
Japanese Albums Chart	1

=== Decade-end charts ===
Chart (1980–89)	Position
Japanese Albums Chart	5

== Release history ==
Country	Date	Label	Format	Catalog number	Notes
Japan	December 21, 1984	For Life Records	LP	28K81	
Japan	December 21, 1984	For Life Records	Audio cassette	28C62	
Japan	December 21, 1984	For Life Records	CD	35KD4	
Japan	February 21, 1990	For Life Records	CD	FLCF-29035	
Japan	May 30, 2001	For Life Records	CD	FLCF-3855	Original recording digitally remastered
Japan	March 25, 2009	For Life Music Entertainment/BMG	SHM-CD	FLCF-5008	2001 Digital remaster

== See also ==
- 1984 in Japanese music
