= Blue Selection =

Studio album by Yosui Inoue
- Released: November 20, 2002
- Genre: Jazz fusion
- Label: For Life Music Entertainment

Yosui Inoue chronology
Cassis (2002)	Blue Selection (2002)	Love Complex (2006)

Singles from Blue Selection
- 1. "Kazari ja nai no yo Namida wa" Released: October 23, 2002

Blue Selection is the studio album by Japanese singer-songwriter Yōsui Inoue, released shortly after its predecessor Cassis.

Like The Night Without a Guide album came out in 1992, it includes renewed renditions of his previous released songs. Those interpretations features the jazz-influence arrangements, and they were recorded by his then-touring band.

The lead-off track "Kazari ja Nai no yo Namida wa" was released as a single prior to the album, but it was almost disregarded. Likewise, Blue Selection itself managed to reach the top-20 on the chart, and has been one of the least successful albums for Inoue.

== Track listing ==
All songs written and composed by Yōsui Inoue, unless otherwise noted

1. "Kazari ja Nai no yo Namida wa (飾りじゃないのよ 涙は)" - 4:05
2. "Kagi no Kazu (鍵の数)" (Inoue/Natsumi Hirai) - 4:45
3. "Dance wa Umaku Odorenai (ダンスはうまく踊れない, Dansu wa Umaku Odorenai)" - 3:57
4. "Eiga ni Ikou (映画に行こう)" - 4:58
5. "Canary" - 4:58
6. "Usotsuki Diamonds (嘘つきダイアモンド, Usotsuki Daiamondo)" - 5:55
7. "Final Love Song" - 5:17
8. "Wakan'nai (ワカンナイ)" - 4:05
9. "Hai-iro no Yubisaki (灰色の指先)" - 6:06
10. "Umi e Kinasai (海へ来なさい)" (Inoue/Katz Hoshi) - 4:39
11. "Saigo no News (最後のニュース, Saigo no Nyusu)" - 5:51

== Chart positions ==
=== Album ===
Year	Chart	Position	Sales
2002	Japanese Oricon Weekly Albums Chart (Top 300)	20	35,000

=== Single ===
Year	Single	B-Side(s)	Chart	Position	Sales
2001	"Kazari ja Nai no yo Namida wa"	"Kimerareta Rhythm"	Japanese Oricon Weekly (top 200)	93	2,000

== Release history ==
Country	Date	Label	Format	Catalog number
Japan	November 20, 2002	For Life Music Entertainment	CD	FLCF-3919
Japan	November 20, 2002	For Life Music Entertainment	LP	FLJF-9529
