= Shopping (Inoue Yōsui and Okuda Tamio album) =

Studio album by InoueYōsuiOkudaTamio
- Released: March 19, 1997
- Recorded: at Hitokuchizaka, Sony Music Shinanomachi, Paradise Komazawa, Greenbird Suginami
- Genre: J-pop, rock
- Length: 52:28
- Label: For Life Records/Sony Music Entertainment Japan
- Producer: Yōsui Inoue, Tamio Okuda

Yōsui Inoue chronology
Eien no Sur (1994)	Shopping (1997)	Kudan (1998)

Tamio Okuda chronology
30 (1995)	Shopping (1997)	Failbox (1997)

Singles from Shopping
- 1. "Arigatou" Released: February 13, 1997

Shopping (ショッピング, Shoppingu) is the first album by InoueYosuiOkudaTamio, the duo consisting of Japanese singer-songwriters Yōsui Inoue and Tamio Okuda. It was released in February 1997 under For Life and SME, two different labels that Inoue and Okuda had contracted with, respectively.

They formed songwriting team in the mid 1990s, the era that Okuda disbanded Unicorn and launched his solo career. 1995 saw the first release of their collaborative material, "Tsuki Hitoshizuku" co-written and sung by pop icon Kyōko Koizumi. In the following year, the pair wrote the song "Asia no Junshin" for Puffy, the new female pop duo produced by Okuda. It was released as Puffy's debut single in May 1996 and became a huge hit, peaking at number-three on the Japanese Oricon singles chart and selling over 1.18 million copies. Shopping features the remake versions of above‐mentioned songs by Inoue and Okuda, along with 10 of new songs that they wrote together.

Prior to the album, "Arigatou" was released as a single in February 1997. Both lead single and the album received moderate commercial success, entering top-ten on the Japanese Oricon Charts. In 2001, Inoue remade the song "Tebiki no You na Mono" on his album United Cover. Ten years after the album release, the pair recorded its successor Double Drive.

== Track listing ==
All songs written and composed by Yōsui Inoue and Tamio Okuda, except lyrics for "Tsuki Hitoshizuku" co-written by Kyōko Koizumi

1. "Wabisuke (侘び助)" - 3:08
2. "2 Cars" - 4:32
3. "Soutou na Ketsui (相当な決意)" - 4:24
4. "Shopping (ショッピング, Shoppingu)" - 2:40
5. "Igai na Kotoba (意外な言葉)" - 5:48
6. "Colorful (カラフル, Karafuru)" - 3:37
7. "2500" - 6:39
8. "A to B (AとB, Ē to Bī)" - 4:57
9. "Tsuki Hitoshizuku (月ひとしずく)" - 4:13
10. "Tebiki no You na Mono (手引きのようなもの)" - 4:57
11. "Arigatou (ありがとう)" - 3:36
12. "Asia no Junshin (アジアの純真, Ajia no Junshin)" - 3:53

== Chart positions ==
=== Album ===
Year	Chart	Position	Sales
1997	Japanese Oricon Weekly Albums Chart (top 100)	4	350,000

=== Single ===
Year	Single	B-Side	Chart	Position	Sales
1997	"Arigatou"	"Wabisuke" (Outtake)	Japanese Oricon Weekly (top 100)	10	249,000

== Release history ==
Country	Date	Label	Format	Catalog number
Japan	March 19, 1997	For Life Records	CD	FLCF-3679
Japan	March 19, 1997	Sony Music Entertainment Japan	CD	SRCL-3769
