= Doshin Hall =

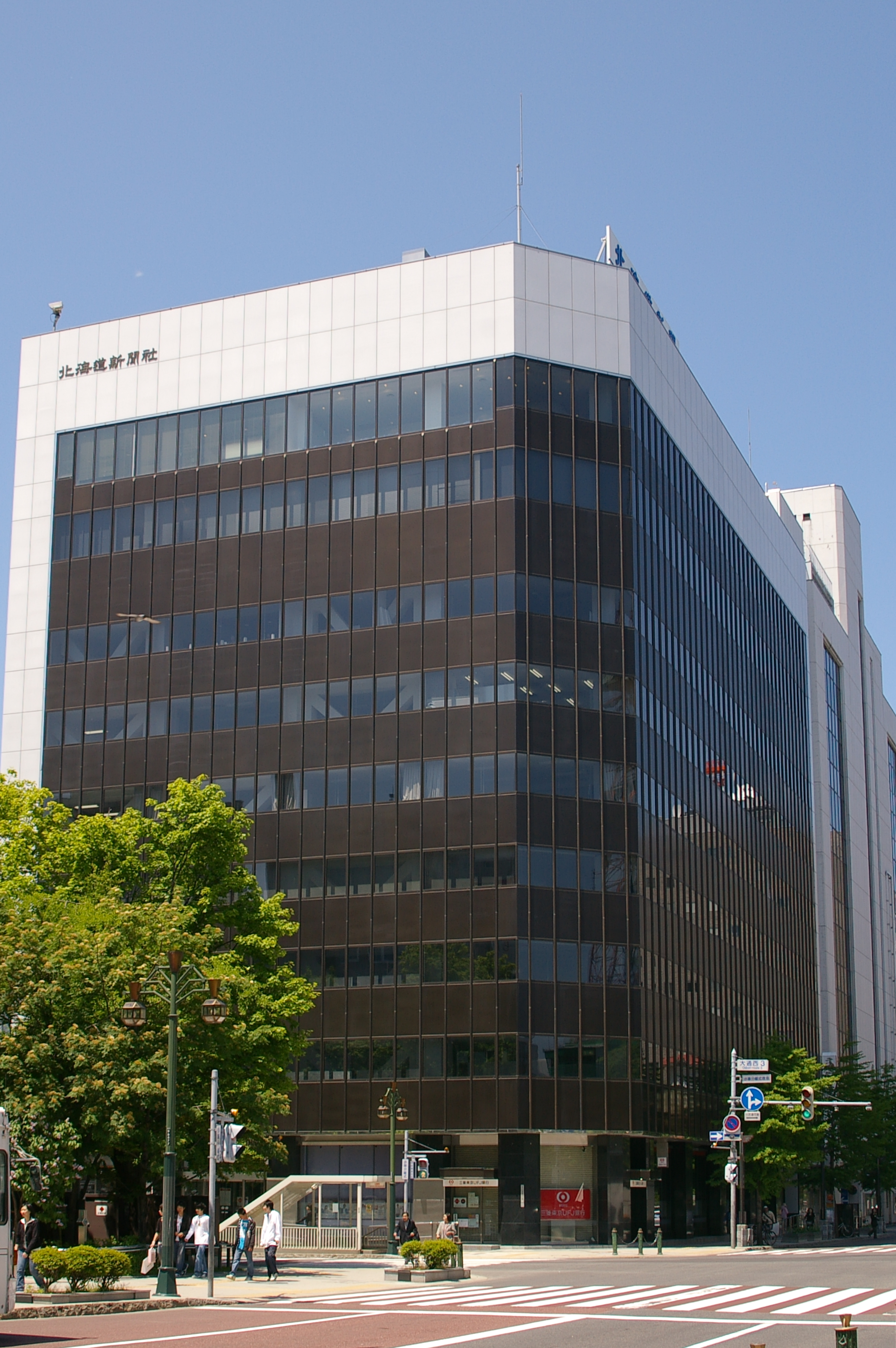
Doshin Hall

Doshin Hall (道新ホール) is a 700-seat multi-purpose hall located in Sapporo, Japan. It opened in 1979 and has hosted artists such as Paul Rodgers, Tamio Okuda and Aimer.
