= Silent Love (EP) =

EP by Akina Nakamori
- Released: 21 December 1984
- Recorded: 1984
- Studio: Aoi Studio; Cherry Island Studio; Sound City Studio
- Genre: Idol Kayokyoku, Pop
- Length: 19:14
- Language: Japanese
- Label: Warner Pioneer
- Producer: Yuuzou Shimada

Akina Nakamori chronology
| Possibility (1984) | Silent Love (1984) | Bitter and Sweet (1985) |

Silent Love (stylized as SILENT L♥️VE) is the second mini album by Japanese singer Akina Nakamori. It was released on 21 December 1984 under the Warner Pioneer label. The concept of the album is short story about characters, Dan and Rei who meet on the Christmas Eve on 25 December.

== Background ==
Silent Love is the third album to be released in 1984 and first mini album release for the first time in two years. The album doesn't include any single songs and are full new 4 recorded tracks.

The music production team consist of arranger Ichizou Seo, lyricist Shizuka Ijūin and composer Daisuke Inoue.

== Stage performances ==
On the Fuji TV music television program Yoru no Hit Studio, Akina performed "Terminal made no Eve".

== Chart performance ==
The album reached number two on the Oricon Album Weekly Chart, charted 16 weeks and selling over 282,000 copies.

== Track listing ==
All lyrics by Shizuka Ijuin; all music by Daisuke Inoue; all arrangements by Ichizou Seo.

| No. | Title | Length |
|---|---|---|
| 1. | "Blue Bay Story" | 4:01 |
| 2. | "Little Party" | 5:04 |
| 3. | "Terminal Made no Eve" | 4:05 |
| 4. | "Hoshi no X'mas-Berry: A Tender Star" | 5:58 |

== Release history ==
| Year | Format(s) | Serial number | Label(s) | Ref. |
|---|---|---|---|---|
| 1984 | LP | L-5601 | Warner Pioneer | |
| 1988 | CD | 18L2-47 | Warner Pioneer | |
| 2022 | 2CD | WPCL-13442 | Warner Pioneer | |

Notes:

- 2022 re-release includes lacquer remaster which includes subtitles in the tracks "2022 lacquer remaster" along with original karaoke version of the tracks

== See also ==
- 1984 in Japanese music
