= Good Pages =

Good Pages is the series of retrospective album by a Japanese singer-songwriter Yōsui Inoue.

The primary edition of Good Pages mainly comprises the songs which appeared on two studio albums: Danzetsu and its follow-up Yosui Two: Sentimental, which came out before he made a breakthrough with his 1973 effort Kori no Sekai. This compilation also includes hit singles such as "Yamiyo no Kuni kara", and "Yume no Naka e" along with its flip side "Itsunomanika Shoujo wa". It was initially issued on vinyl only and remained 45 weeks on the Japanese Oricon charts, spending 3 consecutive weeks at number-one.

In October 1975, an audio cassette version entitled Best Pages came out. The contents were different from the original edition, and the order of the track list was chronological.

== Track listing (1975 release) ==
Good Pages (1975 version)

Compilation album by Yōsui Inoue
- Released: July 21, 1975
- Recorded: Various
- Genre: Folk
- Label: Polydor Japan
- Producer: Hidenori Taga

Yōsui Inoue chronology
Nishoku no Koma (1974)	Good Pages (1975 version) (1975)	Yōsui Seitan (1975)

All songs written and composed by Yōsui Inoue, arranged by Katz Hoshi (except "Tsumetai Heya no Sekai Chizu" co-arranged by Kousuke Onozaki, "Adokenai Kimi no Shigusa" arranged by Inoue)

=== Side one ===
1. "Yamiyo no Kuni kara (闇夜の国から)"
2. "Shiroi Fune (白い船)"
3. "Tsumetai Heya no Sekai Chizu (つめたい部屋の世界地図)"
4. "Adokenai Kimi no Shigusa (あどけない君のしぐさ)"
5. "Nokonoshima no Kataomoi (能古島の片想い)"
6. "Kasa ga Nai (傘がない)"

=== Side two ===
1. "Kagirinai Yokubou (限りない欲望)"
2. "Yume no Naka e (夢の中へ)"
3. "Kan-nazuki ni Kakomarete (神無月にかこまれて)"
4. "Itsunomanika Shoujo wa (いつのまにか少女は)"
5. "Itsumo to Chigatta Haru (いつもと違った春)"
6. "Jinsei ga Nido Areba (人生が二度あれば)"

== Track listing (1975 cassette edition entitled Best Pages) ==
Best Pages

Compilation album by Yōsui Inoue
- Released: July 21, 1975
- Recorded: Various
- Genre: Folk
- Label: Polydor Japan
- Producer: Hidenori Taga

Yōsui Inoue chronology
Yōsui Seitan (1975)	Best Pages (1975)	Shoutaijou no Nai Show (1976)

=== Side-A ===
1. "Danzetsu (断絶)"
2. "Kansha Shirazu no On'na (感謝知らずの女)"
3. "Jinsei ga Nido Areba (人生が二度あれば)"
4. "Shiroi Fune (白い船)"
5. "Kasa ga Nai (傘がない)"
6. "Higashi e Nishi e (東へ西へ)"
7. "Yoru no Bus (夜のバス)"
8. "Natsu Matsuri (夏まつり)"
9. "Kami Hikouki (紙飛行機)"

=== Side-B ===
1. "Nokonoshima no Kataomoi (能古島の片想い)"
2. "Tsumetai Heya no Sekai Chizu (つめたい部屋の世界地図)"
3. "Akazu no Fumikiri (あかずの踏切り)"
4. "Hajimawari (はじまり)"
5. "Kōri no Sekai (氷の世界)"
6. "Shiroi Ichinichi (白い一日)" (Inoue/Kei Ogura)
7. "Kokoro Moyou (心もよう)"
8. "Koharu Obasan (小春おばさん)"
9. "Yūdachi (夕立)"
10. "Gomen (御免)"
11. "Nishoku no Koma (二色の独楽)"

== Chart positions ==
Year	Album	Country	Chart	Position	Sales
1975-76	Good Pages	Japan	Oricon Weekly LP Albums Chart (top 100)	1	275,000+
1975-76	Best Pages	Japan	Oricon Weekly CT Chart (top 100)	1	51,000+
