= Lion & Pelican =

Studio album by Yōsui Inoue
- Released: December 5, 1982
- Recorded: KRS Studio, Sound Inn Studio, Take One Studio, Banana Studio
- Genre: Adult contemporary
- Label: For Life
- Producer: Yōsui Inoue

Yōsui Inoue chronology
Ayashii Yoru wo Matte (1981)	Lion & Pelican (1982)	Ballerina (1983)

Singles from Lion & Pelican
- 1. "Riverside Hotel" Released: July 5, 1982; 2. "Tomadou Pelican" Released: October 21, 1982; 3. "Aisaretebakari Iru to" Released: February 5, 1983

Lion & Pelican is the tenth studio album recorded and produced by Japanese singer-songwriter Yōsui Inoue, released in December 1982.

The album has been well known for a song "Riverside Hotel", which was originally released as a single before the album came out. It became a smash hit in later years, because the song was featured as a theme song for the drama Love Story in New York aired on Fuji TV in 1988.

Lion & Pelican also includes Inoue's own rendition of "Senaka Made 45-fun" and "Chinese Food", the songs that he previously wrote for Kenji Sawada's album Mis Cast released in 1982. The album itself gained moderate commercial success, selling in excess of 150,000 copies although it couldn't reach the top-ten on the charts.

== Track listing ==
All lyrics written and composed by Yosui Inoue

1. "Tomadou Pelican (とまどうペリカン)"
2. "Chinese Food"
3. "Yakusoku wa Reiji (約束は0時)"
4. "Aisaretebakari Iru to (愛されてばかりいると)"
5. "Canary (カナリア, Kanaria)"
6. "Love Shock Night (ラブ ショック ナイト, Rabu Shokku Naito)"
7. "Riverside Hotel (リバーサイド ホテル, Ribāsaido Hoteru)"
8. "Onegai wa Hitotsu (お願いはひとつ)"
9. "Wakannai (ワカンナイ)"
10. "Senaka Made 45-fun (背中まで45分)"

== Personnel ==
The following personnel was credited in the liner notes for box-set No Selection, released in 1991.

- Yōsui Inoue - Lead vocals, chorus, guitar
- Tōru Aoyama - Guitar
- Kazuo Shiina - Guitar
- Fujimal Yoshino - Guitar
- Hiromi Yasuda - Guitar
- Kenji Ōmura - Guitar
- RA - Guitar
- Ryōmei Shirai - Guitar
- Makoto Matsushita - Guitar
- Akira Wada - Guitar
- Tsugutoshi Gotō - Bass
- Akira Okazawa - Bass
- Michio Nagaoka - Bass
- Shigeru Okazawa - Bass
- Kiyofumi Onoda - Bass
- Yasuharu Nakanishi - Keyboards
- Ryoichi Kuniyoshi - Keyboards
- Tōru Okada - Keyboards
- Yūji Kawashima - Synthesizer
- Izumi Kobayashi - Synthesizer
- Osamu Nakajima - Percussion
- Motoya Hamaguchi - Percussion
- Hideo Yamaki - Drums
- Jun Aoyama - Drums
- Eiji Shimamura - Drums
- Kiyoshi Tanaka - Drums

== Production ==
- Producer, performer, composer, lyricist: Yōsui Inoue
- Arranger: Yūji Kawashima (M2/4/5/10), Katz Hoshi (M1/7), Tsugutoshi Gotō (M3/9), Ginji Itou (M6), Yasuharu Nakanishi (M8)
- Director: Shohei Kaneko
- Recording and Remix Engineer: Toshiyuki Iizumi, Tomiji Iyobe, Yūji Kawashima
- Coordinator: Masahiko Ikeda
- Art Director: Isao Sakai
- Photographer: Katsuo Hanzawa
- Stylist: Hideo Mori
- Hair/Make: Kikumaru
- Design: Takeharu Tanaka, Yumiko Ohta (Soap inc.)
- Artist Management: Camp Co., Ltd.

== Chart positions ==
=== Album ===
Year	Country	Chart	Position	Sales
1982-83	Japan	Oricon Weekly LP Albums Chart (top 100)	13	158,000+
1982-83	Japan	Oricon Weekly CT Albums Chart (top 100)	22	158,000+

=== Singles ===
Single	B-Side	Chart	Position	Sales
”Riverside Hotel"	"Ore no Jimusho wa Camp"	Japanese Oricon Weekly (top 100)	11	214,000
"Tomadou Pelican"	"Music High"	Japanese Oricon Weekly (top 100)	69	20,000
"Aisaretebakari Iru to" [Single version]	"Senaka Made Yonjū-go Fun"	Japanese Oricon Weekly (top 100)	35	41,000

== Release history ==
Country	Date	Label	Format	Catalog number	Notes
Japan	December 5, 1982	For Life Records	LP	28K45	
Japan	December 5, 1982	For Life Records	Audio cassette	28C29	
Japan	April 21, 1985	For Life Records	CD	35KD8	
Japan	February 21, 1990	For Life Records	CD	FLCF-29033	
Japan	May 30, 2001	For Life Records	CD	FLCF-3853	Original recording digitally remastered
Japan	March 25, 2009	For Life Music Entertainment/BMG	SHM-CD	FLCF-5006	2001 Digital remaster

== See also ==
- 1982 in Japanese music
