= Every Night (Yōsui Inoue album) =

Studio album by Yōsui Inoue
- Released: December 5, 1980
- Recorded: at the Hitokuchizaka Studio, Sound Inn Studio, Media Studio, K.R.S.Studio, Sound City Studio, July 22 – October 15, 1980
- Genre: Pop, rock, adult contemporary
- Label: For Life
- Producer: Yōsui Inoue

Yōsui Inoue chronology
Sneaker Dancer (1979)	Every Night (1980)	Ayashii Yoru wo Matte (1981)

Every Night is the 8th studio album by a Japanese singer-songwriter Yōsui Inoue, released in December 1980.

== Track listing ==
All songs written and composed by Yōsui Inoue

=== Side one ===
All songs arranged by Akira Inoue (except "Crazy Love" and "Seken-jin de Go" arranged by Shigeru Suzuki)

1. "Sanakanda (サナカンダ)"
2. "Crazy Love (クレイジーラブ, Kureijī Rabu)"
3. "Seken-jin de Go (世間人でGO)"
4. "Winter Wind"
5. "Hachigatsu no Kyūka (8月の休暇)"

=== Side two ===
All songs arranged by Akira Inoue (except "I yai yai" and "Pool ni Oyogu Salmon" arranged by Shigeru Suzuki)

1. "Every Night"
2. "Kotae wa Understand (答えはUNDERSTAND, Kotae wa Andāsutando)"
3. "I yai yai"
4. "Pool ni Oyogu Salmon (プールに泳ぐサーモン, Pūru ni Oyogu Sāmon)"
5. "Sora wa Blue Angel (空はブルーエンジェル, Sora wa Burū Enjeru)"

== Personnel ==
- Yōsui Inoue – Vocals, acoustic guitar
- Chūei Yoshikawa – Acoustic guitar, autoharp, ukulele
- Tōru Aoyama – Electric guitar, acoustic guitar
- Shigeru Suzuki – Electric guitar
- Hideki Matsubara – Electric guitar
- Tsuyoshi Kon – Electric guitar, pedal-steel guitar
- Youichi Taniguchi – Steel guitar
- Akihiro Tanaka – Bass guitar
- Shigeru Okazawa – Bass guitar
- Yasuharu Nakanishi – Acoustic piano
- Hidetoshi Yamada – Acoustic piano
- Akira Inoue – Acoustic piano, Synthesizer, hammond organ
- Makiko Tashiro – Acoustic piano, Synthesizer, hammond organ
- Hiroshi Shibui – Synthesizer
- Pecker – Percussion
- Yoshinori Sugawara – Percussion
- Koutarou Ishii – Percussion
- Hideo Yamaki – Drums
- Yutaka Uehara (credited to "Yukari Uehara") – Drums
- Takeo Kikuchi – Drums
- Masahiro Miyazaki – Drums
- Jake H. Conception – Saxophone
- Kenji Nakazawa – Flugel horn
- Ōno Strings – Strings
- Eve – Background vocals
- Tokyo Concerts – Background vocals

== Chart positions ==
Year	Country	Chart	Position	Sales
1980–81	Japan	Oricon Weekly LP Albums Chart (top 100)	28	65,000+
1980–81	Japan	Oricon Weekly CT Albums Chart (top 100)	59	65,000+

== Release history ==
Country	Date	Label	Format	Catalog number	Notes
Japan	December 5, 1980	For Life Records	LP	28K12	
Japan	December 5, 1980	For Life Records	Audio cassette	28C3	
Japan	August 21, 1985	For Life Records	CD	35KD19	
Japan	February 21, 1990	For Life Records	CD	FLCF-29031	
Japan	May 30, 2001	For Life Records	CD	FLCF-3851	Original recording digitally remastered
Japan	March 25, 2009	For Life Music Entertainment/BMG	SHM-CD	FLCF-5004	2001 Digital remaster

== See also ==
- 1980 in Japanese music
