= Love Complex =

Studio album by Yosui Inoue
- Released: June 28, 2006
- Genre: Folk rock
- Length: 48:57
- Label: For Life Music Entertainment

Yosui Inoue chronology
Blue Selection (2002)	Love Complex (2006)	Double Drive (with Tamio Okuda) (2007)

Love Complex is the 23rd studio album by Japanese singer-songwriter Yōsui Inoue, released in June 2006.

The album features "Atarashii Koi", a song co-written by Kou Machida. It was used on the TV ad of Suntory's Old Whisky that starring Inoue, and released as a single before the album came out. Flip side of a single was "Nagai Neko", a song that Inoue's daughter Sarasa Ifu wrote the lyrics.

== Track listing ==
All songs written and composed by Yōsui Inoue, unless otherwise noted

1. "11;36 Love Train" - 3:54
2. "Psychedelic Love Letter" - 4:09
3. "Navigation" - 5:32
4. "Mystery Anata ni Muchū (ミステリー あなたに夢中)" - 4:17
5. "Kakū no Seiza (架空の星座)" (Inoue/Akiko Yano) - 5:18
6. "Atarashii Koi (新しい恋)" (Inoue/Kou Machida) - 5:09
7. "Kumo no Su Paradise (蜘蛛の巣パラダイス)" (Inoue/Chiharu Mikuzuki) - 3:19
8. "Nagai Neko (長い猫)" (Inoue/Sarasa Ifu) - 3:37
9. "Uta ni Sasowarete (歌に誘われて)" - 3:20
10. "Aisareru no ga Woman (愛されるのがWOMAN)" - 4:25
11. "Anata ni Okane (あなたにお金)" - 5:57

== Chart positions ==
=== Album ===
Year	Chart	Position	Sales
2006	Japanese Oricon Weekly Albums Chart (Top 300)	13	22,000

=== Single ===
Year	Single	B-Side(s)	Chart	Position	Sales
2006	"Atarashii Koi"	"Nagai Neko"	Japanese Oricon Weekly (top 200)	50	4,000

== Release history ==
Country	Date	Label	Format	Catalog number
Japan	June 28, 2006	For Life Music Entertainment/BMG	CD	FLCF-4143
