= Kōri no Sekai =

Studio album by Yōsui Inoue
- Released: December 1, 1973
- Recorded: at the Mori Studio (Tokyo, JP) / Trident and Advision Studios (London, UK), June–September 1973
- Genre: Folk rock
- Label: Polydor Japan
- Producer: Hidenori Taga

Yōsui Inoue chronology
Yōsui Live "Modori Michi" (1972)	Kōri no Sekai (1973)	Nishoku no Koma (1974)

Singles from Kōri no Sekai
- 1. "Kokoro Moyou"/"Kaerenai Futari" Released: September 21, 1973

Kōri no Sekai (氷の世界) is the third studio album by Japanese singer-songwriter Yōsui Inoue, released in December 1973.

== Overview and song information ==
Kōri no Sekai was recorded after a single "Yume No Naka e" (夢の中へ) became a smash hit. Part of the recording took place at the Trident and Advision studios in London, United Kingdom, with musicians including two former members of the band Quatermass, John Gustafson and Pete Robinson. Three of them including title track were co-arranged by Nicky Harrison. Harrison was also the strings arranger for The Rolling Stones' Goats Head Soup album, which topped the chart in the U.S. and UK in Autumn 1973.

A song "Kokoro Moyou" was released as a lead single in September 1973 and became his first top-ten charting hit consequently, peaking at #7 on the Oricon. It was originally titled "Futsū Yūbin" and written for the folk duo Betsy & Chris, but the pair refused to record his song. A pop idol Saori Minami covered "Kokoro Moyou" on her album Natsu no Kanjou released in a following year. Ayaka Hirahara and Akina Nakamori also recorded the song in later years.

Flip side of a single "Kokoro Moyou" was "Kaerenai Futari", a ballad Inoue and Kiyoshirō Imawano wrote together. Reportedly, then-unknown co-writer eked out a living by the income of the song, until he became popular as a frontman of the band RC Succession in the 1980s. Imawano joined the songwriting on "Machibouke" too, and occasionally collaborated with Inoue in later years.

The lead-off track of the album was initially written by Inoue alone, and it was previously issued on his live album Modori Michi. The studio recording version of "Akazu no Fumikiri" heard on Kōri no Sekai is completely different song, which features renewed composition by the arranger Katz Hoshi.

== Commercial success ==
Yōsui Inoue's Kōri no Sekai album marked unprecedented success for the Japanese music industry at the time, becoming the first long-playing record that has retailed more than a million copies in Japan alone. Universal Music Group stated that the vinyl release of Kori no Sekai sold more than 1.35 million copies. Comprising other formats such as audio cassette and compact disc, the album has sold over 1.45 million copies to date.

In the history of the Oricon Albums chart started in 1970, Kōri no Sekai has been the album with the most weeks at number-one. About two weeks after the release, the album topped the Japanese Oricon Weekly LP chart for the first time, and stayed there for 13 consecutive weeks. Since then, it continuously remained on the top-ten of the chart for 113 weeks, and returned to the number-one spot again and again, while Inoue himself subsequently released some albums. Eventually Kōri no Sekai entered the Oricon for 150 weeks, spending 35 weeks in total at the top.

== Track listing ==
All songs written and composed by Yōsui Inoue (except where indicated)

=== Side one ===
All songs arranged by Katz Hoshi (except "Chie-Chan" and "Kōri no Sekai" co-arranged by Nick Harrison)

1. "Akazu no Fumikiri (あかずの踏切り)" (Inoue/Katz Hoshi) - 2:34
2. "Hajimari (はじまり)" - 0:35
3. "Kaerenai Futari (帰れない二人)" (Inoue/Kiyoshirō Imawano) - 4:20
4. "Chie-Chan (チエちゃん)" - 2:43
5. "Kōri no Sekai (氷の世界)" - 4:11
6. "Shiroi Ichinichi (白い一日)" (Inoue/Kei Ogura) - 2:27
7. "Jiko Ken'o (自己嫌悪)" - 2:38

=== Side two ===
All songs arranged by Katz Hoshi (except "Fun" co-arranged by Nick Harrison)

1. "Kokoro Moyou (心もよう)" - 3:25
2. "Machibouke (待ちぼうけ)" (Inoue/Imawano) - 2:41
3. "Sakura Sangatsu Sanpomichi (桜三月散歩道)" (Inoue/Kunio Nagatani) - 3:05
4. "Fun" - 2:40
5. "Koharu Obasan (小春おばさん)" - 3:07
6. "Oyasumi (おやすみ)" - 2:51

== Personnel ==
- Barry DeSouza - Drums
- Tatsuo Hayashi - Drums
- Shuichi Murakami - Drums
- Tadaaki Misago - Drums
- Peter Robinson - Piano, mellotron, harpsichord
- Ann Odell - Piano
- Jun Fukamachi - Piano, synthesizer, Mellotron
- Naoya Matsuoka - Piano
- John Gustafson - Electric bass
- Haruomi Hosono - Electric bass
- Takao Yamamura - Electric bass
- Masayoshi Takanaka - Electric guitar. Bass guitar
- Joe Gammer - Electric guitar
- Mark Warner - Electric guitar
- Ray Fenwick - Acoustic guitar
- Hiromi Yasuda - Acoustic guitar, flat mandolin
- Yosui Inoue - Vocals, acoustic guitar, blues harp
- Judd Mcniven - Blues harp
- Toshiyui Ōe - Steel guitar
- Toshio Tanioka - Violin
- Arrival - Chorus
- Katz Hoshi - Chorus

== Awards ==
Japan Record Awards
Year	Title	Category	Winner(s)
1974 (16th)	Kōri no Sekai	Best Products	Yōsui Inoue / Polydor Japan

== Chart positions ==
=== Album ===
Year	Country	Chart	Position	Sales
1973-76	Japan	Oricon Weekly LP Albums Chart (top 100)	1	1,389,000+
1973-76	Japan	Oricon Weekly CT Albums Chart (top 100)	2	1,389,000+

=== Single ===
Year	Single	B-Side	Chart	Position	Sales
1973	"Kokoro Moyou"	"Kaerenai Futari"	Japanese Oricon Weekly (top 100)	7	423,000

== Release history ==
Country	Date	Label	Format	Catalog number	Notes
Japan	December 1, 1973	Polydor	LP	MR5038	
Japan	December 1, 1973	Polydor	Audio cassette	CR1122	
Japan	Unknown	Polydor	LP	MR3304	Re-issue with alternative cover art
Japan	September 1, 1983	Polydor	CD	3113-11	
Japan	September 1, 1990	Polydor	CD	POCH-1025	
Japan	June 26, 1996	Polydor	CD	POCH-1574	Original recording digitally remastered (clean version)
Japan	December 19, 2001	Universal	CD	UPCH-1126	Original recording digitally remastered (24-bit)
Japan	October 4, 2006	Universal	CD	UPCY-6255	2001 Remaster
Japan	October 4, 2006	Universal	LP	UPJY-9003	2001 Remaster
Japan	December 17, 2009	Universal	SHM-CD	UPCY-6503	2001 Remaster

== See also ==
- 1973 in Japanese music
