= Kazari ja Nai no yo Namida wa =

Single by Akina Nakamori

from the album Bitter and Sweet
- Language: Japanese
- English title: The Tears Are Not a Decoration
- B-side: "Moonlight Letter"
- Released: November 14, 1984
- Recorded: 1984
- Genre: J-pop; kayōkyoku; pop rock
- Length: 4:10
- Label: Reprise Records
- Songwriter: Yōsui Inoue
- Producer: Yūzō Shimada

Akina Nakamori singles chronology
"Jukkai (1984)" (1984)	"Kazari ja Nai no yo Namida wa" (1984)	"Meu amor é..." (1985)

Music videos
- "Kazari ja Nai no yo Namida wa" (Live) on YouTube

"Kazari ja Nai no yo Namida wa" (飾りじゃないのよ涙は; lit. "The Tears Are Not a Decoration") is the 10th single by Japanese entertainer Akina Nakamori. Written by Yōsui Inoue, the single was released on November 14, 1984, by Warner Pioneer through the Reprise label. It was also the lead single from her seventh studio album Bitter and Sweet.

== Background ==
Producer Yūzō Shimada was initially not impressed with the song when he listened to the demo version, but he changed his mind and approved it as a single when songwriter Inoue performed it with Nakamori in a live studio recording.

Inoue recorded "Kazari ja Nai no yo Namida wa" on his 1984 self-cover album 9.5 Carats. Nakamori has re-recorded the song for the 1995 compilation True Album Akina 95 Best and the 2002 self-cover compilation Utahime Double Decade. In 2002, she performed the song on the 54th Kōhaku Uta Gassen, making her first and final appearance on NHK's New Year's Eve special since 1988.

== Chart performance ==
"Kazari ja Nai no yo Namida wa" became Nakamori's sixth No. 1 on Oricon's weekly singles chart and sold over 624,800 copies.

== Track listing ==
All music is composed by Yōsui Inoue; all music is arranged by Mitsuo Hagita.

Original release
No.	Title	Lyrics	Length
1.	"Kazari ja Nai no yo Namida wa" ((飾りじゃないのよ涙は; "The Tears Are Not a Decoration"))	Yōsui Inoue	4:10
2.	"Moonlight Letter" (Mūnraito Retā (ムーンライト・レター))	Gorō Matsui	4:26
Total length:			8:36

1998 reissue bonus track
No.	Title	Lyrics	Length
3.	"Kazari ja Nai no yo Namida wa (Live Version)" ((飾りじゃないのよ涙は(LIVE VERSION)))	Inoue

== Charts ==
Chart (1984)	Peak position
Japan (Oricon)	1

== Cover versions ==
- Yasuko Naitō covered the song on her 1988 cover album Songs II.
- The Nolans covered the song in English as "Tears" on their 1991 cover album Tidal Wave (Samishii Nettaigyo).
- Fukuyama Engineering Golden Oldies Band covered the song on their 2002 cove album The Golden Oldies.
- Shuichi "Ponta" Murakami featuring Kōji Kikkawa covered the song on the 2003 album My Pleasure: Featuring Greatest Musicians.
- Aya Shimazu covered the song on her 2005 album BS Nippon no Uta III.
- Hiromi Iwasaki covered the song on her 2008 cover album Dear Friends IV.
- Tokiko Kato covered the song on her 2008 cover album Songs: Uta ga Machi ni Nagareteita.
- GO!GO!7188 covered the song on their 2008 cover album Doranoana 2.
- Chage (with Aya Matsuura and Tairiku Sada) covered the song on his 2009 album Many Happy Returns.
- Yōko Kon covered the song on her 2013 album Konjaku Uta: Pinky to Otoko Uta.
- Megumi Mori covered the song on her 2013 cover album Re:Make1.
- Penicillin covered the song as the B-side of their 2013 single "Gensō Catharsis".
- Lisa Ono covered the song on her 2014 album Japao 3.
- Juju covered the song as the B-side of her 2015 single "What You Want".
- King Gnu covered the song on the 2019 various artists album Yōsui Inoue Tribute.
- Shō Kiryūin covered the song on his 2020 cover album Utatte Kiririnpa.
- Ms. Ooja covered the song on her 2022 cover album Nagashi Ooja 2: Vintage Song Covers.
- Hiroji Miyamoto covered the song on his 2022 cover album "Aki no Hi ni".
- Ado covered the song on her 2023 cover album Ado’s Utattemita Album.
- Masayuki Suzuki covered the song in Nakamori's 2025 tribute album "Nakamori Akina Tribute Album: Meikyo"

== Release history ==
Year	Format(s)	Serial number	Label(s)	Ref.
1984	7inch LP	L-1666	Warner Pioneer	
1988	8cm CD, CT	10SL-139, 10L5-4049	Warner Pioneer	
1998	12cm CD	WPC6-8667	Warner Pioneer	
2008	Digital download	-	Warner Pioneer	
2014	Digital download - remaster	-	Warner Pioneer	

== See also ==
- 1984 in Japanese music
