= Sneaker Dancer =

Studio album by Yōsui Inoue
- Released: September 21, 1979
- Genre: Rock
- Label: For Life
- Producer: Yōsui Inoue, Hidenori Taga

Yōsui Inoue chronology
White (1978)	Sneaker Dancer (1979)	Every Night (1980)

Singles from Sneaker Dancer
- 1. "Nazeka Shanghai"/"Musume ga Nejireru Toki" Released: August 5, 1979

Sneaker Dancer (スニーカーダンサー) is the seventh studio album by Japanese singer-songwriter Yosui Inoue, released in September 1979.

== Track listing ==
All songs written and composed by Yōsui Inoue, except where indicated

=== Side one ===
All songs arranged by Masayoshi Takanaka (except "Jiken" and "Kon'ya" arranged by Katz Hoshi)

1. "Sneaker Dancer (スニーカーダンサー, Snīkā Dansā)" (Inoue/Masayoshi Takanaka)
2. "Mellow Touch"
3. "Jiken (事件)" (Inoue/Hitoshi Komuro)
4. "Kon'ya (今夜)"
5. "Jenny My Love (ジェニーMy Love)"

=== Side two ===
All songs arranged by Katz Hoshi (except "Nazeka Shanghai" and "Musume ga Nejireru Toki" arranged by Masayoshi Takanaka)

1. "Nazeka Shanghai (なぜか上海, Nazeka Shanhai)"
2. "Feminist (フェミニスト)"
3. "Musume ga Nejireru Toki (娘がねじれる時)"
4. "Umi e Kinasai (海へ来なさい)" (Inoue/Katz Hoshi)
5. "Shousha to Shite no Pegasus (勝者としてのペガサス)"

== Personnel ==
- Yōsui Inoue - Vocals, acoustic guitar
- Masayoshi Takanaka - Electric guitar, acoustic guitar, solina
- Tsuyoshi Kon - Electric guitar
- Kazuo Shiina - Electric guitar
- Getao Takahashi - Electric bass, percussion
- Akihiro Tanaka - Electric bass
- Hiroki Inui - Acoustic piano, Hammond organ, synthesizer
- Kiyozumi Ishikawa - Acoustic piano
- Yasuharu Nakanishi - Electric piano, acoustic piano
- Yūji Yoshikawa - Percussion
- Osamu Nakajima - Percussion
- Yuki Sugawara - Percussion, timbales
- Majority Clapping Association - Hand-clapping
- Yutaka Uehara - Drums
- Shigeru Inoue - Drums, synth drums
- Jake H. Conception - Saxophone
- Hidefumi Toki - Saxophone
- Shin Kazuhara - Flugel horn
- Mitsuru Aim - Flute
- Masaharu Ishibashi - Flute
- Yukio Etou - Flute
- Katou Takashi Group - Strings
- Ōno Tadaaki Group - Strings
- Kayoko Ishū - Chorus
- Kayoko Wada - Chorus
- Hiroko Suzuki - Chorus
- Minako Yoshida - Chorus

== Chart positions ==
=== Album ===
Year	Country	Chart	Position	Sales
1979	Japan	Oricon Weekly LP Albums Chart (top 100)	3	92,000+
1979	Japan	Oricon Weekly CT Albums Chart (top 100)	23	92,000+

=== Single ===
Year	Single	B-Side	Chart	Position	Sales
1979	"Nazeka Shanghai"	"Musume ga Nejireru Toki"	Japanese Oricon Weekly (top 100)	87	5,000

== See also ==
- 1979 in Japanese music
