= Under the Sun (Yosui Inoue album) =

Studio album by Yosui Inoue
- Released: September 15, 1993
- Recorded: Paradise Studio Komazawa, Studio Jive, Adagio Atelier, Hitokuchizaka, Burnish Stone (Tokyo, Japan); Little Mountain, Warehouse (Vancouver, Canada)
- Genre: J-pop (Folk rock, adult contemporary)
- Length: 52:21
- Label: For Life

Yosui Inoue chronology
The Night Without a Guide (1992)	Under the Sun (1993)	Eien no Shuru (1994)

Singles from Under the Sun
- 1. "Gogatsu no Wakare"/"Be-Pop Juggler" Released: March 19, 1993; 2. "Make-Up Shadow" Released: July 21, 1993; 3. "Canadian Accordion" Released: November 3, 1993

Under the Sun is the 16th studio album by Japanese singer-songwriter Yōsui Inoue, released in September 1993.

Two songs "Gogatsu no Wakare" and "Make-Up Shadow" were released as a single prior to the album, and the latter became a massive hit.

"Make-Up Shadow" was featured as the theme song for Subarashikikana Jinsei, a television drama aired on Fuji TV. The music was composed by Jun Sato (who used the pseudonym Utsuru Ayame), and Inoue wrote the lyrics. The song became the highest-charting single for Inoue, reaching number-two on the Japanese Oricon Weekly Singles charts, selling in excess of 800,000 copies. Sato also arranged the song, and his arrangement won him a prize at the 35th Japan Record Awards.

The album debuted at the number-one on the Japanese Oricon, and became his fifth chart-topping non-compilation album since 9.5 Carats released in 1984.

== Track listing ==
All songs written and composed by Yosui Inoue (except where indicated)

1. "Be-Pop Juggler" - 3:10
2. "Eleven" - 4:43
3. "Mizugameza no Yoru (水瓶座の夜)" - 4:37
4. "Power Down" - 4:42
5. "Make-up Shadow" (Utsuru Ayame/Inoue) - 4:07
6. "Canadian Accordion (カナディアン アコーデオン, Kanadian Akōdeon)" (Kyouhei Tsutsumi/Inoue) - 5:34
7. "Kagi no Kazu (鍵の数)" (Inoue/Natsumi Hirai) - 4:28
8. "Stoic (ストイック, Sutoikku)" (Inoue/Jun Satō/Yasushi Akimoto) - 5:50
9. "Go-gatsu no Wakare (5月の別れ)" - 5:06
10. "Under the Sun" - 5:41
11. "Nagai Hanashi (長い話)" (Inoue/Banana-UG-Kawashima) - 4:06

== Personnel ==
- Yosui Inoue - Lead and background vocals, acoustic guitar
- Jun Sato - Piano, electric piano, keyboards, synthesizer, acoustic guitar, percussion, background vocals
- Banana-UG-Kawashima - Synthesizer, piano
- Yoshinobu Kojima - Organ, piano
- Yasuharu Nakanishi - Piano
- Yasuhiro Kobayashi - Accordion
- Tsuyoshi Kon - Acoustic guitar, electric guitar, bass guitar
- Susumu Osada - Electric guitar
- Haruo Kubota - Electric guitar
- Koki Ito - Bass guitar
- Chiharu Mikuzuki - Bass guitar
- Hiroshi Igarashi - Auto harp, banjo, steel drums
- Motoya Hamaguchi - Percussion, kalimba
- Nobu Saito - Percussion
- Hideo Yamaki - Drums
- Jun Aoyama - Drums
- Shin Kazuhara - Trumpet
- Jake H. Conception - Saxophone
- Taro Kiyooka - Trombone
- Hidefumi Toki - Clarinet
- Aska Strings (conducted by Aska Kaneko) - Strings
- Ma*To - Computer programming
- Keishi Urata - Computer programming
- Hideki Matsutake - Computer programming
- Naoki "Taro" Suzuki - Drums programming
- Seri - Background vocals
- Nisa - Background vocals
- Anna - Background vocals
- Eve - Background vocals

== Production ==
- Arranger: Yosui Inoue (#1,4), Jun Sato (#5,6,8,9), Tsuyoshi Kon (#2), Banana-UG-Kawashima (#3,11), Yasuharu Nakanishi (#7), Haruo Kubota (#10)
- Composer: Yosui Inoue (All tracks except #5,6), Utsuru Ayame (#5), Kyohei Tsutsumi (#6), Natsumi Hirai (#7), Jun Sato (#8), Banana-UG-Kawashima (#11)
- Lyricist: Yosui Inoue (All tracks except #9), Yasushi Akimoto (#9)
- Mixing Engineer: Tamotsu Yoshida, Jun Tendo, Takayoshi Yamanouchi, Yuta Kagema
- Recording Engineer: Jun Tendo, Junichi YAmazaki, Takayoshi Yamanouchi, Yuji Kuraishi, Kazuya Yoshida, Kazuya Miyazaki
- Session Support Engineer: Kenji Igarashi, Yutaka Uematsu, Motoyoshi Komine, Junichi Hohrin, Yuko Suzuki, Hajime Nagai, Kenji Matsunaga, Kaoru Matsuyama
- Mastering Engineer: Toru Kotetsu, Masayoshi Nakajo
- Art/Styling: Sachico Ito
- Photographer: Kenji Miura
- Artwork producer: Noriko Shimoyama
- Artwork designer:Shuzo Hayashi
- Artwork supervisor: Tomio Watanabe
- Artwork: Hiroshi Shoji
- Promotion Staff: Mitsuo Sakauchi, Yasuhide Sasa
- Production Coordinator: Sei Sato, Takashi Yokoo, Yasuko Makino, Chiharu Senoma
- Production Manager: Nao Funatsu
- Production Assistant: Hidenori Muto, Rie Nishioka, Satoko Ishizaki

== Chart positions ==
=== Album ===
Year	Chart	Position	Sales	RIAJ Certification
1993	Japanese Oricon Weekly Albums Chart (Top 100)	1	370,000	Platinum

=== Singles ===
Year	Single	B-Side	Chart	Position	Sales	RIAJ Certification
1992	"Gogatsu no Wakare"	"Be-Pop Juggler"	Japanese Oricon Weekly (top 100)	27	89,000	Gold
1992	"Make-Up Shadow"	"Present"	Japanese Oricon Weekly (top 100)	2	817,000	3× Platinum
1992	"Canadian Accordion"	"Hikiage Mono no Uta"	Japanese Oricon Weekly (top 100)	35	24,000	—

== Release history ==
Country	Date	Label	Format	Catalog number
Japan	September 15, 1993	For Life Records	CD	FLCF-30220
Japan	September 15, 1993	For Life Records	Audio cassette	FLTF-28040
Japan	March 25, 2009	For Life Music Entertainment/BMG	SHM-CD	FLCF-5013
