= Nishoku no Koma =

Studio album by Yōsui Inoue
- Released: October 1, 1974
- Recorded: June 22 – July 12, 1974, at the A&M Studios, Los Angeles, United States
- Genre: Folk rock
- Length: 45:47
- Label: Polydor Japan
- Producer: Hidenori Taga

Yōsui Inoue chronology
Kōri no Sekai (1973)	Nishoku no Koma (1974)	Good Pages (1975)

Singles from Nishoku no Koma
- 1. "Yūdachi"/"Zenmai Jikake no Kabutomushi" Released: September 1, 1974; 2. "Gomen"/"Tabi kara Tabi" Released: June 21, 1975

Nishoku no Koma (二色の独楽) is the fourth studio album by Japanese singer-songwriter Yosui Inoue, released in October 1974.

All tracks which appeared on the album were recorded at the studios in Los Angeles, owing to a record producer Hidenori Taga's suggestion. Except an arranger Katz Hoshi and a guitarist Hiromi Yasuda, recording for the album were completed by the Western session musicians. In addition to Hoshi who had participated in Inoue's previous albums, Gene Page joined the arrangement for some songs. The title track was arranged by Jack Nitzsche, who appointed all personnel and controlled the recording of the song rigidly.

Highly recommended by the recording artist himself, the song "Yūdachi" was released as a single prior to the album. It features an arrangement reminiscent of "Sympathy for the Devil" by The Rolling Stones. Because of the contribution for the song, an arranger Katz Hoshi won the 16th Japan Record Awards for "Best Arrangement" category.

Like a predecessor, Nishoku no Koma also reached the top on the Japanese Oricon Weekly LP charts, and remained there for ten consecutive weeks.

== Track listing ==
All songs written and composed by Yōsui Inoue

=== Side one ===
All songs arranged by Katz Hoshi (except "Gomen", "Tsuki ga Warau" arranged by Gene Page, "Nishoku no Koma" arranged by Jack Nitzsche)

1. "Kasa ga Nai (傘がない) (Introduction)" - 1:09
2. "Yūdachi (夕立)" - 2:35
3. "Taiyou no Machi (太陽の町)" - 1:11
4. "Happy Birthday" - 3:56
5. "Zenmai Jikake no Kabutomushi (ゼンマイじかけのカブト虫)" - 3:05
6. "Gomen (御免)" - 2:59
7. "Tsuki ga Warau (月が笑う)" - 3:43
8. "Nishoku no Koma (二色の独楽)" - 5:18

=== Side two ===
All songs arranged by Katz Hoshi (except "London Kyūkou" and "Taiyou no Machi" arranged by Gene Page)

1. "Kimi to Boku no Blues (君と僕のブルース, Kimi to Boku no Burūsu)" - 3:31
2. "No-ichigo (野イチゴ)" - 2:54
3. "London Kyūkou (ロンドン急行)" - 3:38
4. "Tabi kara Tabi (旅から旅)" - 4:29
5. "Nemuri ni Sasoware (眠りにさそわれ)" - 4:14
6. "Taiyou no Machi (太陽の町)" - 3:03

== Personnel ==
- Yosui Inoue - Vocals, guitar
- Ray Parker Jr. - Guitar
- David T. Walker - Guitar
- Louie Shelton - Guitar
- Jesse Ed Davis - Guitar
- Hiromi Yasuda - Guitar
- Dennis Budimir - Guitar
- Orville Red Rhodes - Steel guitar
- Edward Green - Drums
- Harvey Mason - Drums
- Wilton Felder - Bass guitar
- Max Bennett - Bass guitar
- Scott Edwards - Bass guitar
- Reine Press - Bass guitar
- Larry Muhoberac - Keyboards
- Joe Sample - Keyboards
- Clarence McDonald - Keyboards
- Peter Robinson - Keyboards
- Jack Nitzsche - Keyboards
- Joe Clayton - Percussion
- Milt Holland - Percussion
- Alan Estes - Percussion
- Gary Coleman - Percussion

== Production ==
- Hidenori Taga - Produce
- Yasuo Kawase - Assistant
- Katsuya Amuro - Assistant
- Yoshiyuki Okuda - Management
- Henry Lewy - Engineer
- Bruce Botnich - Engineer
- Susumu Ohno - Engineer
- Fuyuo Nakamura - Photography
- Yosui Inoue - Photography
- Fukuyo Inoue - Photography
- Osamu Sakai - Layout design

== Chart positions ==
=== Album ===
Year	Country	Chart	Position	Sales
1974-76	Japan	Oricon Weekly LP Albums Chart (top 100)	1	668,000+
1974-76	Japan	Oricon Weekly CT Albums Chart (top 100)	1	668,000+

=== Singles ===
Year	Single	B-Side	Chart	Position	Sales
1974	"Yūdachi"	"Zenmai Jikake no Kabutomushi"	Japanese Oricon Weekly (top 100)	15	140,000
1975	"Gomen"	"Tabi kara Tabi"	Japanese Oricon Weekly (top 100)	29	80,000

== Awards ==
Japan Record Awards
Year	Title	Category	Winner
1974 (16th)	"Yūdachi"	Best Arrangements	Katz Hoshi

== Release history ==
Country	Date	Label	Format	Catalog number	Notes
Japan	October 1, 1974	Polydor	LP	MR5050	
Japan	October 1, 1974	Polydor	Audio cassette	Unknown	
Japan	Unknown	Polydor	LP	25MX-1057	Re-issue with alternative cover art
Japan	September 1, 1983	Polydor	CD	3113-12	
Japan	September 1, 1990	Polydor	CD	POCH-1024	
Japan	June 25, 1996	Polydor	CD	POCH-1575	Original recording digitally remastered (20-bit)
Japan	December 19, 2001	Universal	CD	UPCH-1127	Original recording digitally remastered (24-bit)
Japan	October 4, 2006	Universal	CD	UPCY-6256	2001 Remaster
Japan	October 4, 2006	Universal	LP	UPJY-9004	2001 Remaster
Japan	December 17, 2009	Universal	SHM-CD	UPCY-6504	2001 Remaster

== See also ==
- 1974 in Japanese music
