= Danzetsu =

Studio album by Yōsui Inoue
- Released: May 1, 1972
- Genre: Folk rock
- Label: Polydor Japan
- Producer: Hidenori Taga

Yōsui Inoue chronology
Danzetsu (1972)	Yōsui II: Sentimental (1972)

Singles from Danzetsu
- 1. "Jinsei ga Nido Areba"/"Danzetsu" Released: March 1, 1972; 2. "Kasa ga Nai"/"Kansha Shirazu no On'na" Released: July 1, 1972

Danzetsu (断絶) is the debut album by Japanese singer-songwriter Yōsui Inoue, released in May 1972.

Backing tracks of the album were mainly played by the instrumentalists of The Mops, and they were arranged by the group's guitarist Katz Hoshi. Hoshi continued working as an arranger for most of Inoue's studio albums released in later years.

Prior to the album, "Jinsei ga Nido Areba" came out as a single (B-Side was the album's title track which features his aggressive vocals that homage Paul and Linda McCartney's song "Monkberry Moon Delight"). Danzetsu is best known by "Kasa ga Nai" which was released as the second single from the album. It became one of his signature songs, and later recorded by multiple artists like Off Course, Kazuyoshi Saito, UA, Mucc, and Akina Nakamori. Bank Band, the charity project formed by Mr. Children's frontman Kazutoshi Sakurai and his musical collaborator Takeshi Kobayashi, interpreted the song "Kagirinai Yokubō" on their album 'Soushi Souai released in 2004.

Because of his breakthrough in the following year, Danzetsu enjoyed long-term commercial success on the Japanese Oricon charts during the mid-1970s, entering there for over three years.

== Track listing ==
All songs written and composed by Yōsui Inoue, arranged by Katz Hoshi

=== Side one ===
1. "Akogare (あこがれ)" – 4:00
2. "Danzetsu (断絶)" – 3:57
3. "Moshimo Ashita ga Hare nara (もしも明日が晴れなら)" – 2:30
4. "Kansha Shirazu no On'na (感謝知らずの女)" – 3:09
5. "Chiisana Te (小さな手)" – 3:27
6. "Jinsei ga Nido Areba (人生が二度あれば)" – 5:00

=== Side two ===
1. "Ai wa Kimi (愛は君)" – 2:44
2. "Hato ga Naiteiru (ハトが泣いている)" – 2:27
3. "Shiroi Fune (白い船)" – 3:33
4. "Kagirinai Yokubou (限りない欲望)" – 4:24
5. "Uchi e Okaeri (家へお帰り)" – 2:42
6. "Kasa ga Nai (傘がない)" – 5:31

== Personnel ==
- Yosui Inoue – folk guitar, vocals
- Takao Kisugi – folk guitar
- Shigeru Hara – folk guitar
- Katz Hoshi – folk and Electric guitars
- Taro Miyuki – bass guitar
- Jun Fukamachi – piano, Hammond organ
- Johnny Yamazaki – electric Piano
- Mikiharu Suzuki – drums

== Chart positions ==
=== Album ===
Country	Chart	Position	Sales
Japan	Oricon Weekly LP Albums Chart (top 100)	8	510,000+

=== Single ===
Single	B-Side	Chart	Position	Sales
"Kasa ga Nai"	"Kansha Shirazu no Onna"	Japanese Oricon Weekly (top 100)	69	63,000

== Release history ==
Country	Date	Label	Format	Catalog number	Notes
Japan	May 1, 1972	Polydor	LP	MR5013	
Japan	Unknown	Polydor	LP	MR3302	
Japan	August 1, 1985	Polydor	CD	H32P20035	
Japan	September 1, 1990	Polydor	CD	POCH-1022	
Japan	June 26, 1996	Polydor	CD	POCH-1571	Original recording digitally remastered
Japan	December 19, 2001	Universal	CD	UPCH-1123	Original recording digitally remastered
Japan	October 4, 2006	Universal	CD	UPCY-6252	2001 Remaster
Japan	October 4, 2006	Universal	LP	UPJY-9001	2001 Remaster
Japan	December 17, 2009	Universal	SHM-CD	UPCY-6500	2001 Remaster
