= Shōtaijō no Nai Show =

Studio album by Yōsui Inoue
- Released: March 25, 1976
- Genre: Folk rock
- Length: 48:35
- Label: For Life
- Producer: Yōsui Inoue

Yōsui Inoue chronology
| Yōsui Seitan (1975) | Shōtaijō no Nai Show (1976) | White (1978) |

Shōtaijō no Nai Show (招待状のないショー) is the fifth studio album by Japanese singer-songwriter Yosui Inoue, issued in March 1976. It was the first long-play record he released under the For Life Records, a record label that he joined as one of the co-founders and started in 1975.

== Track listing ==
All songs written and composed by Yōsui Inoue, except where indicated

=== Side one ===
1. "Good, Good-Bye" – 3:37
2. "Shōtaijō no Nai Show (招待状のないショー)" – 3:43
3. "Makurakotoba (枕詞)" – 1:56
4. "Aozora, Hitorikiri (青空、ひとりきり)" – 4:38
5. "Summer" – 3:38
6. "Magarikado (曲り角)" – 4:38
7. "Kotoshi wa (今年は)" – 438

=== Side two ===
1. "Minazuki no Yoru (水無月の夜)" – 4:39
2. "Sakamichi (坂道)" (Inoue, Kei Ogura) – 3:22
3. "Kuchibue (口笛)" – 3:02
4. "I-Shi no Kekkon (I氏の結婚)" – 2:54
5. "Mō...... (もう......)" – 3:45
6. "Musubikotoba (結詞)" – 6:21

== Personnel ==
- Yōsui Inoue – Acoustic guitar, electric guitar, electric bass, backing vocals
- Hiromi Yasuda – Acoustic guitar
- Hirofumi Tokutake – Electric guitar
- Masayoshi Takanaka – Electric guitar, acoustic guitar
- Mitsuo Nagai – Electric guitar, flat mandolin
- Kazuo Shiina – Electric guitar
- Hirokuni Korekata (occasionally credited to Kunihiro Korekata) – Electric guitar
- Kenji Ōmura – Electric guitar
- Shigeru Suzuki – 12-string guitar
- Hirobumi Suzuki – Electric bass
- Toru Hirano – Electric bass
- Tsugutoshi Goto – Electric bass
- Rei Ohara – Electric bass
- Hiroki Komazawa – Steel guitar
- Kunimitsu Inaba – Wood bass
- Masahiro Takekawa – Violin
- Takayoshi Watanabe – Keyboards
- Shigehito Ōhara – Piano
- Masaru Imada – Electric piano
- Jun Fukamachi – Electric piano
- Akiko Yano – Keyboards, backing vocals
- Makoto Yano – Keyboards, electric piano, rhythm box, percussion
- Ichiro Maeda – Keyboards, percussion, rhythm box
- Katz Hoshi – Percussion, backing vocals
- Shuichi Murakami – Drums
- Tatsuo Hayashi – Drums
- Tetsurō Kashibuchi – Drums
- Motoya Hamaguchi – Percussion
- Sancho Nanoha – Percussion
- Nobuo Saito – Percussion
- Fujio Saito – Percussion
- Yukiko Nishizawa – Ocarina
- Sumio Okada – Horn
- Kouji Hatori – Horn
- Kinji Yoshino – 6th

== Chart positions ==
=== Album ===
| Year | Country | Chart | Position | Sales |
|---|---|---|---|---|
| 1976 | Japan | Oricon Weekly LP Albums Chart (top 100) | 1 | 323,000+ |
| 1976 | Japan | Oricon Weekly CT Albums Chart (top 100) | 1 | 323,000+ |

=== Singles ===
| Year | Single | B-Side | Chart | Position | Sales |
|---|---|---|---|---|---|
| 1975 | "Aozora, Hitorikiri" | "Flight" | Japanese Oricon Weekly (top 100) | 8 | 255,000 |
| 1976 | "Good, Good-Bye" [Edit] | "Kodomo e no Uta" | Japanese Oricon Weekly (top 100) | 13 | 149,000 |

== Release history ==
| Country | Date | Label | Format | Catalog number | Notes |
|---|---|---|---|---|---|
| Japan | March 25, 1976 | For Life Records | LP | FLL4002 | |
| Japan | March 25, 1976 | For Life Records | Audio cassette | 28K13 | |
| Japan | August 21, 1985 | For Life Records | CD | 35KD16 | |
| Japan | February 21, 1990 | For Life Records | CD | FLCF-29028 | |
| Japan | September 18, 1992 | For Life Records | Audio cassette | FLTF-28034 | |
| Japan | September 18, 1992 | For Life Records | CD | FLCF-29168 | |
| Japan | May 30, 2001 | For Life Records | CD | FLCF-3848 | Original recording digitally remastered |
| Japan | March 25, 2009 | For Life Music Entertainment/BMG | SHM-CD | FLCF-5001 | 2001 Digital remaster |

== See also ==
- 1976 in Japanese music
