= The Night Without a Guide =

Studio album by Yōsui Inoue
- Released: November 20, 1992
- Recorded: at Sedic, Heartbeat, Adagio Atelier, and the Paradise Studio Komazawa
- Genre: Folk rock
- Length: 53:32
- Label: For Life
- Producer: Yōsui Inoue, Jun Satō

Yōsui Inoue chronology
Handsome Boy (1990)	The Night Without a Guide (1992)	Under the Sun (1993)

The Night Without a Guide (ガイドのいない夜, Gaido no Inai Yoru) is the studio album by Japanese singer-songwriter Yosui Inoue, released in November 1992.

The album comprises the newly arranged versions of the songs that Inoue himself had already recorded on his albums or singles, except "Just Fit" which was written for Mis Cast album by Kenji Sawada in 1982. Inoue stated that over 20 songs were re-recorded during the sessions. Rest of them excluded from the album have not been released, except "No-ichigo" appeared on the flip side of a single "Musubikotoba".

== Track listing ==
All songs written and composed by Yōsui Inoue, unless otherwise noted

1. "Tsumetai Heya no Sekai Chizu (つめたい部屋の世界地図)" - 4:32
2. "Higashi e Nishi e (東へ西へ)" - 4:32
3. "Umi e Kinasai (海へ来なさい)" (Katz Hoshi/Inoue) - 5:31
4. "Canary (カナリア, Kanaria)" - 4:11
5. "Shiroi Ichinichi (白い一日)" (Kei Ogura/Inoue) - 5:18
6. "Musubikotoba (結詞)" - 4:07
7. "Just Fit" - 4:26
8. "Ai no Soubi (愛の装備)" - 5:13
9. "Natsu Matsuri (夏まつり)" - 5:10
10. "Nemuri ni Sasoware (眠りにさそわれ)" - 5:22
11. "Tomadou Pelican (とまどうペリカン)" - 5:21

== Chart positions ==
=== Album ===
Year	Chart	Position	Sales	RIAJ Certification
1992	Japanese Oricon Weekly Albums Chart (Top 100)	7	205,000+	Platinum

=== Single ===
Year	Single	B-Side	Chart	Position	Sales
1992	"Musubikotoba"	"No-Ichigo" [New recording]	Japanese Oricon Weekly (top 100)	33	70,000
