= Handsome Boy (album) =

Studio album by Yōsui Inoue
- Released: October 21, 1990
- Genre: Folk rock
- Length: 47:31
- Label: For Life
- Producer: Yōsui Inoue

Yōsui Inoue chronology
Negative (1987)	Handsome Boy (1990)	The Night Without a Guide (1992)

Handsome Boy is the 14th studio album by a Japanese singer-songwriter Yōsui Inoue, released in 1990.

The album contains the songs that were already known through the commercial tie-in with television programs or advertisements. Like "Gallery" which was recorded by Yoko Oginome and released as a single in June 1990, some of the materials were previously interpreted by other performers.

Prior to the album, three songs were released as a single; "Yume Ne Mi", "Saigo no News", and "Shounen Jidai" which was co-written by Natsumi Hirai and has been one of his most well-known songs throughout Inoue's longtime career. It was initially featured on the theme song for an award-winning film adaptation of Fujiko Fujio (A)'s manga Childhood Days (based on Hyouzou Kashiwabara's novel Nagai Michi). The song was gradually recognized through the TV ad of Sony Handycam which was aired during the following year. "Shounen Jidai" became his biggest hit single, peaking at No. 4 on the Japanese chart and selling more than 850,000 copies in total. In 1997, 3-inch CD single of the song was certified quadruple platinum by the Recording Industry Association of Japan, for shipments of over 1 million copies.

Led by the success of a single "Shounen Jidai", the album Handsome Boy itself also gained favorable reaction, peaking at No. 2 on the Japanese Oricon chart and entering top-100 for over 10 months with sales of about 640,000 copies.

== Track listing ==
All songs written and composed by Yōsui Inoue, unless otherwise noted

1. "Pi Po Pa" – 3:55
2. "Emily (エミリー, Emirī)" – 3:35
3. "Rival (ライバル, Raibaru)" (Inoue, Yūji Kawashima) – 3:51
4. "Saigo no News (最後のニュース)" – 3:55
5. "Gallery (ギャラリー, Gyararī)" – 5:07
6. "Shounen Jidai (少年時代)" (Inoue, Natsumi Hirai) – 3:21
7. "Fiction (フィクション, Fikushon)" – 3:21
8. "Tokyo" (Inoue, Hirai) – 3:56
9. "Yume Ne Mi (夢寝見)" – 5:03
10. "Shizen ni Kazararete (自然に飾られて)" (Inoue, Hirai) – 6:07
11. "Choujikan no Hikou (長時間の飛行)" (Inoue, Kawashima) – 4:22

== Personnel ==
- Yōsui Inoue – Vocals, acoustic guitar
- Hiromi Yasuda – Acoustic guitar
- Kenji Ōmura – Electric guitar
- Tomotaka Imamichi – Electric guitar
- Jun Sumida – Electric guitar
- Masaki Matsubara – Electric guitar
- Masayoshi Furukawa – Gut-string guitar
- Hirokazu Ogura – Gut-string guitar
- Masami Satou – Gut-string guitar
- Tsugutoshi Goto – Bass guitar
- Motofumi Hagiwara – Bass guitar
- Chiharu Mikuzuki – Bass guitar
- Vagabond Suzuki – Bass guitar
- Haruomi Hosono – Bass guitar, synthesizer, percussion
- Tadashi Nanba – Synthesizer
- Akira Inoue – Synthesizer
- Miharu Koshi – Synthesizer
- Akira Senju – Synthesizer
- Shinji Kawahara – Piano
- Takao Kisugi – Piano
- Yasuharu Nakanishi – Piano
- Yūji Kawashima – Synthesizer, computer programming
- Takeshi Fujii – Computer programming
- Hiroaki Sugawara – Computer programming
- Nobuo Tsuji – Computer programming
- Ma*to – Computer programming
- Yasuo Kimoto – Computer programming
- Motoya Hamaguchi – Percussion
- Eiji Narushima – Percussion
- Masato Hashida – Percussion
- Makoto Kimura – Percussion
- Hinotamao – Percussion
- Hideo Yamaki – Drums
- Eiji Shimamura – Drums
- Yutaka Odawara – Drums
- Junichi Kazezaki – Brasswinds
- Shin Kazuhara – Brasswinds
- Kenichirou Hayashi – Brasswinds
- Masahiro Kobayashi – Brasswinds
- Kenji Nakazawa – Brasswinds
- Kenji Nishiyama – Brasswinds
- Taro Kiyooka – Brasswinds
- Sumiyo Okada – Brasswinds
- Watanabe Katsu – Brasswinds
- Teiko Haruna – Woodwinds
- Mitsuru Souma – Woodwinds
- Ryūji Hoshikawa – Woodwinds
- Tadashi Togame – Woodwinds
- Masakazu Ishibashi – Woodwinds
- Toshitsugu Inoue – Woodwinds
- Jake H. Conception – Woodwinds
- Hirofumi Kinjou – Woodwinds
- Masaki Takano – WoodwindsMinako Yoshida
- Hiroyuki Ichihara – Woodwinds
- Hidefumi Toki – Woodwinds
- Aska Kaneko Strings – Strings
- Akiko Yano – Chorus
- Minako Yoshida – Chorus
- Seri Ishikawa – Chorus

== Chart positions ==
=== Album ===
Chart	Position	Sales
Japanese Oricon Weekly Albums Chart (top 100)	2	639,000+

=== Singles ===
Single	B-Side	Chart	Position	Sales
"Yume Ne Mi"	"Beni Suberi"	Japanese Oricon Weekly (top 100)	37	23,000
"Saigo no News"	"Back Side"	Japanese Oricon Weekly (top 100)	57	16,000
"Shounen Jidai"	"Ara-Washi no Uta"	Japanese Oricon Weekly (top 100)	4	853,000

== Release history ==
Country	Date	Label	Format	Catalog number	Notes
Japan	October 20, 1990	For Life Records	CD	FLCF-30081	
Japan	October 20, 1990	For Life Records	Audio cassette	FLTF-26021	
Japan	May 30, 2001	For Life Records	CD	FLCF-3858	Original recording digital remastered
Japan	March 25, 2009	For Life Music Entertainment/BMG	SHM-CD	FLCF-5011	Original recording digital remastered
