= Anzen Chitai =

Japanese rock band

- Origin: Asahikawa, Hokkaido, Japan
- Genres: Rock
- Years active: 1973–1988, 1990–1992, 2002–2003, 2009–present
- Labels: Sony Music Entertainment Japan, Kitty Records, Universal Music Group
- Members: Koji Tamaki; Yutaka Takezawa; Wataru Yahagi; Haruyoshi Rokudo
- Past members: Toshiya Takezawa; Takahiro Miyashita; Kazuyoshi Tamaki; Ichiji Ohira; Yuji Tanaka

YouTube information
- Channel: 【公式】安全地帯 ANZENCHITAI SALTMODERATE
- Years active: 2021–present
- Subscribers: 128 thousand
- Views: 118 million
- Last updated: August 4, 2026

Anzen Chitai (安全地帯; literally "Safety Zone") is a Japanese rock band, formed in 1973 by five musicians in Asahikawa, Hokkaido. After debuting in Tokyo in 1982, they became one of Japan's most successful rock bands of the 1980s.

== History ==
=== 1970s: Beginnings ===
Formed in 1973 as the high-school garage band Invader in Asahikawa, Hokkaido, its original members included vocalist Koji Tamaki, guitarist Yutaka Takezawa and guitarist/keyboardist Toshiya Takezawa, who is also Yutaka's brother. Later, in late 1973, Koji's brother and drummer, Kazuyoshi Tamaki and bassist Takahiro Miyashita joined. In 1977, the band changed its name to Anzen Chitai ("Safety Zone"), and Kazuyoshi Tamaki left the group to be replaced by Ichiji Ohira. By December 1977, Anzen Chitai merged with another band, the Haruyoshi Rokudo Band (六土開正バンド, Rokudō Haruyoshi Bando), and added three more members: bassist Haruyoshi Rokudo, guitarist Wataru Yahagi, and drummer Yuji Tanaka. By this point, they had expanded to an eight-member group. Within the next three years, Toshiya Takezawa and Takahiro Miyashita left. Yuji Tanaka also left at this point.

=== 1980s: Commercial success ===
In 1981, they began work as a backup band for singer-songwriter Yōsui Inoue, and released their debut single, "Moegi Iro no Snap" (萠黄色のスナップ, Moegi Iro no Sunappu) under the Kitty Records in February 1982. However, the final personnel change occurred as Ichiji Ohira left, and Yuji Tanaka returned in his place, establishing the current lineup.

Under the guidance of their producer and co-arranger Masaru Hoshi (星 勝, Hoshi Masaru), lead guitarist and vocalist of the psychedelic rock group The Mops, the band continued to refine their craft in the studio. Their status as a backup band soon changed: in 1984, "Wine Red no Kokoro" (ワインレッドの心, Wain Reddo No Kokoro; lit. Wine Red Heart) reached No. 1 on the Oricon charts, to be followed by among others, "Kanashimi ni Sayonara" (悲しみにさよなら) and "Suki Sa" (好きさ) (featured on the popular Rumiko Takahashi anime series Maison Ikkoku). "Wine Red no Kokoro" was composed by Koji Tamaki with lyrics by Yōsui Inoue. Koji Tamaki was credited as the sole composer in virtually all of Anzen Chitai's music, with Gorō Matsui being the lyricist frequently. Their popularity in the 1980s culminated in a five-day sold-out concert tour at the Nippon Budokan in 1987, which had a total attendance of 60,000. They also held concerts outside Japan, including concerts in Hong Kong Coliseum.

=== 1990s and 2000s: Frequent hiatuses ===
Despite a couple of hiatuses for the sake of solo careers (July 1988 – March 1990, 1993–2001), Anzen Chitai continued to record and tour. A new studio album was released in October 2003, titled Anzen Chitai X (their tenth studio album). After their Japanese concert tour in support of the "Anzen Chitai X" album, the band announced at the end of 2003 that they are taking yet another indefinite hiatus.

In 2006, Koji Tamaki remained active as a solo performer and television actor, with Wataru Yahagi performing in both his solo albums and concerts. Yutaka Takezawa was also active in the music business as a composer, producer, arranger and session guitarist.

On April 28, 2008, fan club members were notified that Tamaki had announced his retirement from music, as well as the closing of the official Koji Tamaki & Anzenchitai fan club, Star. Illness requiring long-term treatment was cited as the reason for as his decision.

During the second half of 2009, the band held secret meetings and decided to regroup. Similar to their amateur days, band members lodged together to practise and compose music.

=== 2010–present: Returning from hiatus ===
On January 8, 2010, the band announced the resumption of their career along with making appearance on the television program Tokudane!. Switching back to Universal Music Japan (which has absorbed their former label Kitty Records and is the distributor of their pre-Sony Music Japan catalog) as their record label, a music video for their new single "Aoi Bara" was released. Their double A-side single "Aoi Bara/Wine Red no Kokoro (2010 version)" was released on March 3, 2010. Tamaki wrote the lyrics and music of "Aoi Bara." The single debuted at No. 9 on Oricon weekly charts, becoming their first Top 10 single in 21 years and 6 months since "Hohoemi ni Kanpai" in 1988.

Anzen Chitai released Anzenchitai XI Starts "Mata ne...", their first album in nearly seven years, on May 26, 2010. They then released Anzen Chitai Hits on June 30, 2010. This album encapsulated the rerecorded versions of their singles throughout the 1980s. Their next studio album, Anzenchitai XII, was released on September 14, 2011, quickly followed by Anzenchitai XIII Junk just months later on November 16, 2011. The band's fourteenth studio album, Anzenchitai XIV ~The Saltmoderate Show~, was released on March 16, 2013.

On December 23, 2022, it was announced that drummer Yuji Tanaka had died on December 17, at the age of 65.

On March 12, 2025, guitarist Yutaka Takezawa revealed on Twitter that he had been diagnosed with esophageal cancer in 2021 and had undergone surgery and chemotherapy, and his illness had gone into remission since then.

== Members ==
=== Current members ===
- Koji Tamaki (玉置浩二, Tamaki Kōji) – vocals, guitars, percussion (1973–present)
- Yutaka Takezawa (武沢豊, Takezawa Yutaka) – guitars (1973–present)
- Wataru Yahagi (矢萩渉, Yahagi Wataru) – guitars (1977–present)
- Haruyoshi Rokudo (六土開正, Rokudō Haruyoshi) bass, piano, keyboards (1977–present)

=== Former members ===
- Toshiya Takezawa (武沢俊也, Takezawa Toshiya) – guitars, keyboards (1973–1981)
- Takahiro Miyashita (宮下隆宏, Miyashita Takahiro) – bass (1973–1978)
- Kazuyoshi Tamaki (玉置一芳, Tamaki Kazuyoshi) – drums (1973–1977)
- Ichiji Ohira (大平市治, Ōhira Ichiji) – drums (1977–1982)
- Yuji Tanaka (田中裕二, Tanaka Yūji) – drums (1977–1978, 1982–2022; his death)

== Discography ==
=== Singles ===
| Year | Album | Chart positions (JP) | Label |
|---|---|---|---|
| 1982 | "Moegi'iro no Snap" (萠黄色のスナップ) | – | Kitty Records |
| 1982 | "On My Way" (オン・マイ・ウェイ) | – | Kitty Records |
| 1983 | "Las Vegas Typhoon" (ラスベガス・タイフーン) | – | Kitty Records |
| 1983 | "Wine Red no Kokoro" (ワインレッドの心) | 1 | Kitty Records |
| 1984 | "Mayonaka Sugi no Koi" (真夜中すぎの恋) | 20 | Kitty Records |
| 1984 | "Masquerade" (マスカレード) | 59 | Kitty Records |
| 1984 | "Koi no Yokan" (恋の予感) | 3 | Kitty Records |
| 1985 | "Nesshisen" (熱視線) | 2 | Kitty Records |
| 1985 | "Kanashimi ni Sayonara" (悲しみにさよなら) | 1 | Kitty Records |
| 1985 | "Aoi Hitomi no Eris" (碧い瞳のエリス) | 2 | Kitty Records |
| 1986 | "Prussian Blue no Shouzou" (プルシアンブルーの肖像) | 2 | Kitty Records |
| 1986 | "Natsu no Owari no Harmony" (夏の終りのハーモニー): (w/ Inoue Yosui) | 6 | Kitty Records |
| 1986 | "Friend" | 7 | Kitty Records |
| 1986 | "Suki sa" (好きさ) | 4 | Kitty Records |
| 1987 | "Jirettai" (じれったい) | 2 | Kitty Records |
| 1987 | "Juliet" | 7 | Kitty Records |
| 1988 | "Tsuki ni Nureta Futari" (月に濡れたふたり) | 13 | Kitty Records |
| 1988 | "I Love You Kara Hajimeyou" (I Love You からはじめよう) | 14 | Kitty Records |
| 1988 | "Hohoemi ni Kanpai" (微笑みに乾杯) | 6 | Kitty Records |
| 1990 | "Jounetsu" (情熱) | 31 | Kitty Records |
| 1991 | "Itsumo Kimi no Soba ni" (いつも君のそばに) | 16 | Kitty Records |
| 1992 | "Ano Koro e" (あの頃へ) | 23 | Kitty Records |
| 1993 | "Hitoribocchi no Yell" (ひとりぼっちのエール) | 14 | Kitty Records |
| 2002 | "Deai" (出逢い) | 20 | Sony Music Records |
| 2002 | "Hansei / Ano Koro e" (反省 / あの頃へ) | 57 | Sony Music Records |
| 2003 | "Ame Nochi Hare / Chocolate" (雨のち晴れ / ショコラ) | 40 | Sony Music Records |
| 2010 | "Aoi Bara / Wine Red no Kokoro (2010 Version)" (蒼いバラ / ワインレッドの心) | 9 | Universal Music Japan |
| 2010 | "Orange / Koi no Yokan (2010 Version)" (オレンジ / 恋の予感) | 17 | Universal Music Japan |
| 2011 | "Kekkai / Denen" (結界 / 田園) | 59 | Universal Music Japan |
| 2022 | "Ai no Senyuu" (愛の戦友) | 18 | Nippon Columbia |
| 2022 | "Anata ga Dokoka de" (あなたがどこかで) | 27 | Nippon Columbia |
"—" denotes releases that did not chart.

=== Albums ===
==== Studio albums ====
| Title | Album details | Peak chart positions | Certifications |
| Title | Album details | JPN Oricon | Certifications |
|---|---|---|---|
| "Anzen Chitai I Remember to Remember" (安全地帯 I Remember to Remember) | Released: January 25, 1983; Label: Kitty Records; Formats: CD, LP, Cassette tape, digital download, streaming | 22 | |
| "安全地帯 II" (安全地帯 II) | Released: May 1, 1984; Label: Kitty Records; Formats: CD, LP, Cassette tape, digital download, streaming | 2 | |
| "Anzen Chitai III: Dakishimetai" (安全地帯 III 〜抱きしめたい) | Released: December 1, 1984; Label: Kitty Records; Formats: CD, LP, Cassette tape, digital download, streaming | 3 | |
| "Anzen Chitai IV" (安全地帯 IV) | Released: November 24, 1985; Label: Kitty Records; Formats: CD, LP, Cassette tape, digital download, streaming | 1 | International Platinum Disc |
| "Anzen Chitai V" (安全地帯 V) | Released: December 14, 1986; Label: Kitty Records; Formats: CD, LP, Cassette tape | 1 | |
| "Anzen Chitai VI: Tsuki ni Nureta Futari" (安全地帯 VI〜月に濡れたふたり) | Released: April 10, 1988; Label: Kitty Records; Formats: CD, LP, Cassette tape, digital download, streaming | 1 | International Gold Disc |
| "Anzen Chitai VII: Yume no Miyako" (安全地帯 VII〜夢の都) | Released: July 25, 1990; Label: Kitty Records; Formats: CD, Cassette tape, digital download, streaming | 2 | |
| "Anzen Chitai VIII: Taiyou" (安全地帯 VIII〜太陽) | Released: December 11, 1991; Label: Kitty Records; Formats: CD, Cassette tape, digital download, streaming | 7 | |
| "Anzen Chitai IX" (安全地帯 IX) | Released: August 7, 2002; Label: Sony Music Records; Formats: CD, Cassette tape, digital download, streaming | 13 | |
| "Anzen Chitai X: Ame Nochi Hare" (安全地帯 X 〜雨のち晴れ〜) | Released: October 22, 2003; Label: Sony Music Records; Formats: CD, digital download, streaming | 20 | |
| "Anzen Chitai XI ☆STARTS☆ "Mata ne...." " (安全地帯 XI ☆STARTS☆「またね…。」) | Released: May 26, 2010; Label: Universal Music Japan; Formats: CD, digital download, streaming | 3 | |
| "Anzen Chitai XII" (安全地帯 XII) | Released: September 14, 2011; Label: Universal Music Japan; Formats: CD, digital download, streaming | 10 | |
| "Anzen Chitai XIII Junk" (安全地帯 XIII) | Released: November 16, 2011; Label: Universal Music Japan; Formats: CD, digital download, streaming | 18 | |
| "Anzen Chitai XIV: The Saltmoderate Show" (安全地帯 XIV) | Released: March 6, 2013; Label: Saltmoderate; Formats: CD, digital download, streaming | 38 | |

==== Live albums ====
| Title | Album details | Peak chart positions |
| Title | Album details | JPN Oricon |
|---|---|---|
| "Endless" | Released: April 25, 1984; Label: Kitty Records; Formats: CD, LP, Cassette tape, digital download | – |
| "Stardust Randevu Inoue Yousui/Anzen Chitai Live at Jinguu" (スターダスト・ランデヴー井上陽水・安全地帯LIVE AT 神宮) | Released: November 5, 1986; Label: Kitty Records; Formats: CD, LP, Cassette tape, digital download | – |
| "Anzen Chitai Live" (安全地帯LIVE) | Released: June 10, 1987; Label: Kitty Records; Formats: CD, LP, Cassette tape, digital download | – |
| "ONE NIGHT THEATER 1985" | Released: August 19, 1998; Label: Kitty Records; Formats: CD, digital download | – |
| "Anzen Chitai VI Live: Tsuki ni Nureta Futari" (安全地帯VI LIVE 〜月に濡れたふたり〜) | Released: November 9, 2005; Label: Universal Music Japan; Formats: CD, digital download | 99 |
| "Anzen Chitai Kanzen Fukkatsu Concert Tour 2010 Special at Nippon Budoukan: Start & Hits "Mata Ne" " (安全地帯 “完全復活" コンサートツアー2010 Special at 日本武道館 〜Start & Hits〜「またね…。」) | Released: December 8, 2010; Label: Universal Music Japan; Formats: CD, digital download | 94 |
| "Anzen Chitai in Koushien Kyuujou Sayonara Game" (安全地帯 IN 甲子園球場「さよならゲーム」) | Released: August 10, 2020; Label: Nippon Columbia; Formats: CD, digital download, streaming | 21 |
| "All The Time Best 35: 35th Anniversary Tour 2017 Live in Nippon Budoukan" (ALL TIME BEST「35」 ～35th Anniversary Tour 2017～ LIVE IN 日本武道館) | Released: January 12, 2022; Label: Nippon Columbia; Formats: CD, digital download, streaming | 30 |
| "Anzen Chitai 40th Anniversary Concert Just Keep Going! Tokyo Garden Theater" (安全地帯 40th ANNIVERSARY CONCERT "Just Keep Going!"Tokyo Garden Theater) | Released: February 21, 2024; Label: Nippon Columbia; Formats: CD, digital download, streaming | 35 |
"—" denotes releases that did not chart.

==== Self-cover albums ====
| Title | Album details | Peak chart positions |
| Title | Album details | JPN Oricon |
|---|---|---|
| "Anzen Chitai. Hits" (安全地帯 Hit) | Released: June 30, 2010; Label: Kitty Records; Formats: CD, digital download, streaming | 14 |
| "The Ballad House: Just Old Fashioned Love Songs" (The Ballad House〜Just Old Fashioned Love Songs〜) | Released: August 22, 2012; Label: Saltmoderate; Formats: CD, digital download | 27 |

==== Soundtrack albums ====
| Title | Album details | Peak chart positions |
| Title | Album details | JPN Oricon |
|---|---|---|
| "Prussian Blue no Shouzou Original Soundtrack" (プルシアンブルーの肖像 オリジナル・サウンドトラック) | Released: August 10, 1986; Label: Kitty Records; Formats: CD, LP, Cassette tape | 4 |

==== Compilation albums ====
| Title | Album details | Peak chart positions | Certifications |
| Title | Album details | JPN Oricon | Certifications |
|---|---|---|---|
| "I Love you kara hajimeyou: Anzen Chitai Best" (I Love Youからはじめよう -安全地帯BEST-) | Released: December 10, 1988; Label: Kitty Records; Formats: CD, LP, Cassette tape, digital download | 4 | International Platinum Disc |
| "Anzen Chitai Best 2: Hitori Bocchi no Yell" (安全地帯ベスト2 〜ひとりぼっちのエール〜) | Released: August 25, 1993; Label: Kitty Records; Formats: CD, Cassette tape, digital download | 10 | |
| "Anzen Chitai/Tamaki Koji Best" (安全地帯/玉置浩二 ベスト) | Released: August 25, 1994; Label: Kitty Records; Formats: CD, digital download | – | |
| "Anzen Chitai Another Collection: Album Mishuuroku Kyokushuu" (安全地帯 アナザー・コレクション -アルバム未収録曲集-) | Released: September 24, 1994; Label: Kitty Records; Formats: CD, digital download, streaming | – | |
| "Anzen Chitai Theme Songs" (安全地帯 テーマソングス) | Released: August 25, 1995; Label: Kitty Records; Formats: CD | – | |
| "Memories: Anzen Chitai Ballad Selection" (memories〜安全地帯バラードセレクション) | Released: April 25, 1996; Label: Kitty Records; Formats: CD | – | |
| "Treasure Collection" | Released: June 30, 1999; Label: Kitty Records; Formats: CD | – | |
| "The Very Best of Anzen Chitai" (THE VERY BEST of 安全地帯) | Released: June 21, 2001; Label: Universal Music Japan; Formats: CD | – | |
| "Goro Matsui & Koji Tamaki Ballad Collection: Only You" | Released: May 29, 2002; Label: Universal Music Japan; Formats: CD | – | |
| "Anzen Chitai Complete Best" (安全地帯 COMPLETE BEST) | Released: March 23, 2005; Label: Universal Music Japan; Formats: CD | – | |
| "Anzen Chitai Golden Best" (安全地帯 ゴールデン☆ベスト) | Released: July 5, 2006; Label: Universal Music Japan; Formats: CD | 156 | |
| "All Time Best" | Released: July 5, 2006; Label: Universal Music Japan; Formats: CD, digital download | 9 | |
| "Anzen Chitai Best" (安全地帯ベスト) | Released: September 20, 2019; Label: Stereo Sound Publishing; Formats: LP, SACD | – | |
| "Anzen Chitai Best No.2" (安全地帯ベスト 第2弾) | Released: February 27, 2020; Label: Stereo Sound Publishing; Formats: LP | – | |
| "The Best Album 40th Anniversary: And Koro he" (THE BEST ALBUM 40th ANNIVERSARY 〜あの頃へ〜) | Released: July 25, 2022; Label: Universal Music Japan; Formats: CD, digital download | 24 | |
"—" denotes releases that did not chart.

==== Box sets ====
| Title | Album details | Peak chart positions |
| Title | Album details | JPN Oricon |
|---|---|---|
| "Anzen Chitai Memorial Collection" (安全地帯 メモリアル・コレクション) | Released: October 2, 1996; Label: Kitty Records; Formats: 12CDs | – |
| "Anzen Chitai Box 1982–1993" (安全地帯BOX 1982–1993) | Released: June 23, 2010; Label: Universal Music Japan; Formats: 12CDs+1DVD | – |
"—" denotes releases that did not chart.

=== Video albums ===
| Title | Album details | Peak chart positions |
| Title | Album details | JPN Oricon |
|---|---|---|
| "Anzen Chitai '84 Summer Yori We're Alive" (安全地帯ライヴ'84サマーツアーより We're ALIVE) | Released: October 25, 1984; Label: Kitty Records; Formats: VHS, LD, DVD, VHD, Betamax | – |
| "One Night Theater Yokohama Stadium Live 1985" (ONE NIGHT THEATER 横浜スタジアム・ライブ1985) | Released: December 21, 1985; Label: Kitty Records; Formats: VHS, LD, DVD, VHD, Betamax | – |
| "Stardust Rendez-vous Yousui Inoue: Anne Chitai Live at Jingū Kyūjō (スターダスト・ランデブー井上陽水・安全地帯 LIVE at 神宮球場) | Released: November 21, 1986; Label: Kitty Records; Formats: VHS, LD, DVD, VHD, Betamax | – |
| "To Me Anzen Chitai Live" (To me 安全地帯LIVE) | Released: June 21, 1987; Label: Kitty Records; Formats: VHS, LD, DVD, VHD, Betamax | – |
| "Anzen Chitai Document I Love You kara HAjimeyou Nippon Budoukan Live" (安全地帯ドキュメントI LOVE YOUからはじめよう 日本武道館ライブ) | Released: March 1, 1989; Label: Kitty Records; Formats: VHS, LD, DVD | – |
| "Anzen Chitai Unplugged Live" (安全地帯アンプラグド・ライヴ!) | Released: August 25, 1993; Label: Kitty Records; Formats: VHS, LD, DVD | – |
| "Anzen Chitai Video Best" (安全地帯ビデオ・ベスト) | Released: August 25, 1994; Label: Kitty Records; Formats: VHS, LD, DVD | – |
| "Anzen Chitai Kanzen Fukkatsu Concert Tour 2010 Special at Nippon Budoukan: Start & Hits "Mata Ne" " (安全地帯 “完全復活" コンサートツアー2010 Special at 日本武道館 〜Start & Hits〜「またね…。」) | Released: December 22, 2010; Label: Universal Music Japan; Formats: DVD, BD | – |
| "30th Anniversary Concert "The Ballad House" | Released: December 22, 2012; Label: Saltmoderate; Formats: DVD | 13 |
| "ANZENCHITAI & KOJI TAMAKI RARE ARCHIVE 2012" | Released: July 30, 2013; Label: Saltmoderate; Formats: DVD, BD | – |
| "30th Anniversary Concert Tour Encore “The Saltmoderate Show" " | Released: September 25, 2013; Label: Saltmoderate; Formats: DVD, BD | – |
| "Anzen Chitai Asia Tour 2013" (安全地帯 ASIA TOUR 2013) | Released: April 2, 2014; Label: Saltmoderate; Formats: DVD | – |
| "All The Time Best 35: 35th Anniversary Tour 2017 Live in Nippon Budoukan" (ALL TIME BEST「35」 ～35th Anniversary Tour 2017～ LIVE IN 日本武道館) | Released: November 13, 2019; Label: Nippon Columbia; Formats: DVD, BD | 9 (DVD); 11 (BD) |
| "Anzen Chitai in Koushien Kyuujou Sayonara Game" (安全地帯 IN 甲子園球場「さよならゲーム」) | Released: July 29, 2020; Label: Nippon Columbia; Formats: DVD, BD | 13 (Blu-Ray); 16 (DVD) |
| "Live Collection 1984–2010: And Koro He" (LIVE COLLECTION 1984–2010 ～あの頃へ～) | Released: May 31, 2023; Label: Nippon Columbia; Formats: 5BD | 9 |
| "Anzen Chitai 40th Anniversary Concert Just Keep Going! Tokyo Garden Theater" (安全地帯 40th ANNIVERSARY CONCERT"Just Keep Going!"Tokyo Garden Theater) | Released: August 2, 2023; Label: Nippon Columbia; Formats: BD | 4 |
"—" denotes releases that did not chart.
