= Yōsui Inoue =

- Also known as: Andre Candre (アンドレ・カンドレ, Andore Kandore)
- Born: Akimi Inoue (井上 陽水, Inoue Akimi); August 30, 1948 (age 78)
- Origin: Tagawa, Fukuoka, Japan
- Genres: Folk rock; rock 'n' roll; adult contemporary
- Occupation: Singer-songwriter
- Instruments: Vocals; guitar; keyboards
- Years active: 1969–present
- Labels: CBS Sony; Polydor Japan; For Life Music Entertainment
- Website: yosui.jp

Yōsui Inoue (井上 陽水, Inoue Yōsui; born August 30, 1948) is a Japanese singer, lyricist, composer, guitarist and record producer, who is an important figure in Japanese music. He is renowned for his unique tone, eccentric lyrics, and dark sunglasses which he always wears.

Under the stage name Andre Candre, Inoue debuted in 1969 and released a single "Candre Mandre" by CBS Sony Records. After he changed his stage name and signed onto Polydor, he recorded his first studio album Danzetsu in 1971, and the album was acclaimed by critics. Inoue gained recognition as a folk-rock singer-songwriter through his 1973 Kōri no Sekai album, which became the first long-playing record that sold more than a million copies in Japan alone. His early work has been compared with the music of Paul McCartney and Roy Orbison. Mark Anderson writes in the Encyclopedia of Contemporary Japanese Culture, "His music was smart, melancholy and melodic. [...] Inoue's work of the early 1970s [...] is widely thought to have been a significant influence on the development of Japanese pop rock".

Inoue has released 22 solo studio albums, and also produced two albums with Tamio Okuda. He has been one of the most commercially successful Japanese male solo recording artists of the last 40 years, selling in excess of 10.9 million copies on the country's Oricon albums chart up to May 2009 and has had seven number-one albums; Kori no Sekai, Nishoku no Koma, Good Pages, Shoutaijou no Nai Show, 9.5 Carats, Under the Sun, and the compilation Golden Best which was released in 1999 and has shipped over two million units.

== Biography ==
=== Early life ===
On August 30, 1948, Akimi Inoue was born in Koubukuro, Kaho District, Fukuoka, Japan. His father, Wakami Inoue, was a dentist who had formerly worked as a surgeon for the Japanese army during World War II, and wanted his sole son to take over the business of his clinic. When Akimi was six years old, he moved to Itoda, Tagawa with his family, and spent his childhood there until he decided to become a musician.

The existence of The Beatles inflated Inoue's interest in music at a young age. Around 1966, Inoue is said to have written his first song. This song has never been recorded, but Inoue has performed the song occasionally during his concerts.

=== Early career; "Andre Candre" ===
In 1969, he recorded the song "Candre Mandre" at his house, in order to be played on the radio program Smash!! 11 which was aired on RKB Mainichi Broadcasting. It received a lot of requests from listeners of the program but, in fact, most of them were from Inoue's friends. However, favorable reaction gave him an opportunity to make a debut. He moved to Tokyo and recorded "Candre Mandre" at the studio, with the arranger Hitoshi Komuro and his band, Rokumonsen. A newly recorded version of the song was released as a single by the CBS Sony label in September 1969, under the distinctive stage name "Andre Candre". He anticipated that "Candre Mandre" would gain success, but it did not receive any commercial reaction. Andore Kandore released three singles but, follow-ups "Beautiful Wonderful Birds" and "Hana ni sae, Tori ni sae (Let Our Hearts Be)" (composed by Takeshi Matsuyama and Kazuhiko Kato) also failed commercially.

Though results of his earliest projects were not outstanding, close relationships with some musicians who worked with him at that time continued for years. Particularly, Hitoshi Komuro supported Inoue till he became a star. Then-unknown Kiyoshiro Imawano, a frontman of RC Succession, wrote several songs including "Kaerenai Futari" and "Machibouke" with Inoue.

=== 1971–1975; Polydor years ===
In 1971, Inoue contracted with the Polydor Records with the support of the company's director Hidenori Taga, and launched the recording of his first studio album entitled Danzetsu. The album features Takao Kisugi (who were still not debuted as a singer-songwriter) on guitar. He changed stage name to "Yosui Inoue", and debuted again under the Polydor in the following year. His first single was "Jinsei ga Nido Areba", a song later included on the Danzetsu album. It features his emotional vocals, akin to sobbing. Later material also feature similar extremely melancholic renditions.

"Yume no Naka e", a song somewhat more accessible than his previous effort, was released as a single in March 1973 and became the first hit for Inoue, entering the top-20 on the Japanese Oricon chart. To promote Inoue's popularity, Polydor asked him to record a new album. Thereupon he recorded concerts held at Shinjuku Kosei Nenkin Kaikan on April 14, 1973. It was issued as the live album Modorimichi in that year's July. During the mid-1970s, the album was successful, owing to the hits of its follow-ups. It is still one of the best-selling live recording albums on the Japanese albums chart, selling over 800,000 copies.

Kōri no Sekai, the third studio album recorded by Inoue and released in December 1973 led him to the stardom. It received unprecedented commercial success in the history of Japanese music industry at the time. Kōri no Sekai topped Oricon album chart for 35 weeks (longest ever), and remained the Top 10 for 113 weeks. The album retailed in excess of a million copies in 1975, becoming the first million-selling album in Japan.

Nishoku no Koma, a follow-up to Kōri no Sekai released in 1974, also topped the chart, and retained its position for ten consecutive weeks. The album features harder arrangements than his early folk-oriented albums, enlisting the studio musicians including David T. Walker, Jesse Ed Davis, Ray Parker Jr., Harvey Mason, and Jack Nitzsche.

Inoue reached the pinnacle of his popularity as a musician in the mid-1970s. The breakthrough providing him with the nickname "Emperor of Japanese Folk-rock", and introduced his more early efforts to listeners (the songs including "Jinsei ga Nido Areba", "Ai wa Kimi", "Kasa ga Nai", "Tsumetai Heya no Sekai Chizu", "Yoru no Bus", "Natsu Matsuri", "Kannazuki ni Kakomarete", "Kami Hikouki", "Nokonoshima no Kataomoi" became popular particularly).

=== 1975–1990 ===
His fifth studio album Shoutaijou no Nai Show was released in 1976, under the newly founded label For Life which was distributed by Canyon Records. Project of forming a record label was initiated by Hitoshi Komuro and Takuro Yoshida, and Inoue and Shigeru Izumiya joined as the co-founders. It was the first example that Japanese musicians came to control a record label. Inoue has released all their albums and singles through For Life for over 30 years, although the label has changed its distributing companies several times.

Inoue contributed three songs for Seri Ishikawa (a singer married to him in 1978) on her 1977 Kimagure album. One of them, "Dance wa Umaku Odorenai" was later covered by an actress Mio Takaki and became a hit.

The U.S. studio musicians who took part in the recording of Inoue's albums tempted him to take the drugs which were rigidly prohibited in his home country. In late July 1977, he purchased marijuana tobacco called Buddha Sticks. And he was arrested in September for possession of them, followed by other sixty Japanese celebrities because of similar suspicions. Inoue made his comeback as a musician laterin the same year and released an album called White in 1978, but his popularity was lost hugely owing to his law breaking.

His 1980 album entitled Every Night is the effort that Katz Hoshi (an arranger who had worked on Inoue's works since Danzetsu album) did not participate in the recording for the first time. Production of his recording was radically changing at that time, featuring alternative arrangers including Masayoshi Takanaka (who participated in Inoue's 1979 Sneaker Dancer album) and Yuji Kawashima (also known by pseudonym "Banana", who has worked with Inoue since Ayashii Yoru wo Matte album released in 1981 and been one of the significant collaborators for him). Except for a hit single "Jealousy", most of Inoue's efforts after his comeback were not as successful as his previous works, but some materials like "Nazeka Shanghai", "Umi e Kinasai", "Tomadou Perican" and "Canary" are regarded as his notable songs throughout his career. In addition, "Riverside Hotel" was widely recognized and becoming a hit in later years.

In 1982, Hokkaido-based Inoue's then-backing band called Anzen Chitai made debut, and he contributed lyrics for their materials composed by a group's frontman Koji Tamaki. One of them, "Wine Red no Kokoro" was released as a single in 1983 and led the group to fame. It reached the number-one on the chart in a following year and became a massive hit, selling more than a 600,000 copies. The song won the 26th Japan Record Award for "Gold Prize", and has been well known as a signature song for the group. Inoue also wrote the lyrics for some of the group's subsequent releases, including a song "Koi no Yokan" that became the second top-ten hit for the band. Also in 1984, Inoue contributed another number-one hit "Kazari ja Nai no yo Namida wa" for a pop idol Akina Nakamori. In addition, Inoue himself scored the top-ten hit "Isso Serenade" in a same year, four his compositions dominated the Japanese singles chart at the same week in December 1984.

His subsequent studio album called 9.5 Carats is a blockbuster that features "Isso Serenade" and his own renditions of above mentioned hit singles. The album mainly consists of his compositions (some of them were co-written by other composers or lyricists such as Tamaki, Yumi Matsutoya, and Takashi Matsumoto) that he already contributed for other performers including Kenji Sawada, Yutaka Mizutani and Inoue's spouse Seri Ishikawa. It topped the Oricon chart and became one of the most commercially successful LP in Japan during 1985. He carried out the concert with Anzen Chitai again, and also released a single "Natsu no Owari no Harmony" (written and sung by Inoue and Tamaki) together. Their concert held at Jingu Stadium was aired on TV, and later its live recordings were released as the album and the video.

In 1988, Yōsui Inoue voiced Mac Tonight in the Japanese commercials.

=== 1990s ===
During the 1990s, Inoue produced two top-3 charting singles on the Japanese chart. "Shounen Jidai" (Boyhood), a song he wrote with Natsumi Hirai was initially featured on the same-titled film adaptation of a manga Childhood Days (written by Fujiko Fujio (A), based on the novel Nagai Michi by Hyouzou Kashiwabara). It was released as a single in 1990, and also appeared on his Handsome Boy album came out in the same year. Because of television advertising for Sony Handycam which featured the song, "Shounen Jidai" became well-known and a huge hit around the early 1990s. As a result, it has been one of his most famous songs throughout his long career.

Another smash hit was "Make-up Shadow" featured on the television drama Subarashikikana Jinsei. It peaked at number-two on the chart, and the song's co-writer/arranger Jun Sato received the honor of winning the 35th Japan Record Awards for "Best Arrangements" category which were given for the magnificently arranged songs. Under the Sun, his 1993 album which features "Make-up Shadow", is the last chart-topping non-compilation for Inoue as of 2009.

Tamio Okuda, a member of the band Unicorn who suspended the group's work and began his solo career in 1994, became a collaborator for Inoue during the mid-1990s. Reportedly, sending a letter from Inoue (who was impressed by the Unicorn's song "Yuki no Furu Machi" written by Okuda) to Okuda became a trigger for them to form a songwriting team. At first, they contributed a song "Tsuki Hitoshizuku" for a pop idol/actress Kyōko Koizumi (who also wrote part of the lyrics with them). "Asia no Junshin", a debut single for Puffy (the duo that Okuda produced), is the most successful song that they wrote together. It was released on CD in March 1996 and sold more than a million copies, peaking at the number-three on the Japanese chart. Along with "Nagisa ni Matsuwaru Et Cetera", another massive hit they wrote for Puffy in 1997, it has been Inoue's live favorites in recent 10 years. Inoue and Okuda formed the group called "InoueYosuiOkudaTamio" in 1997. After their duet "Arigato" became a smash hit, they released an album entitled Shopping. It comprises 12 songs Inoue and Okuda recorded together, including "Arigato" and their own adaptation of "Asia No Junshin" and "Tsuki Hitoshizuku".

In 1999, for celebrating the 30th anniversary of Inoue's career as a recording artist, a double compilation album entitled Golden Best was released. It debuted at the number-one on the Oricon and remained the chart for a year, with the sales of over a million copies. After a year from the album's release, a sequel entitled Golden Bad came out. And in 2003, when the album shipped more than 2 million units, an expanded edition called Golden Best Super was released.

=== 2001–present; United Cover and recent career ===
He scored two smash hit singles "Coffee Rumba" and "Hana no Kubikazari". Both songs were the 1960s kayokyoku (The former was remake of Venezuelan song "Moliendo Café" originally composed in 1958). Likewise, a follow-up studio album United Cover is mainly composed of cover versions of the songs that were popular in Japan during the postwar Showa period. United Cover debuted at #2 on the Japanese Oricon chart and sold more than 500,000 copies up to 2002, and has been certified triple platinum by RIAJ for shipments of over 800,000 copies to date. It has been one of the most commercially successful cover albums by Japanese artists in the 2000s, along with Fukuyama Engineering by Masaharu Fukuyama and Vocalist series by Hideaki Tokunaga.

During the compilation and cover album became a hit, Inoue embarked the concert tour, and live performance was later released on DVD entitled United Tour.

He has continued concert touring repeatedly after 2004. His latest album as a solo artist is Love Complex, released in 2006. Also in 2006, he restarted the project with Tamio Okuda. They worked together mainly during the following year, releasing the album Double Drive and carrying out the tour (their performance was later compiled on DVD entitled Double Shopping Drive). In June 2015, it was announced that Inoue would be releasing a new album of cover songs in July, United Cover2, including songs from co-founder of For Life Records Takuro Yoshida.

== Discography ==
=== Studio albums ===
- Danzetsu (断絶) (1972)
- Yōsui Two: Sentimental (陽水II～センチメンタル) (1972)
- Kōri no Sekai (氷の世界) (1973)
- Nishoku no Koma (二色の独楽) (1974)
- Shoutaijou no Nai Show (招待状のないショー) (1976)
- White (1978)
- Sneaker Dancer (1979)
- Every Night (1980)
- Ayashii Yoru wo Matte (あやしい夜をまって) (1981)
- LION & PELICAN (1982)
- Ballerina (バレリーナ) (1983)
- 9.5 carats (9.5カラット) (1984)
- Negative (1987)
- Handsome Boy (1990)
- The Night Without a Guide (ガイドのいない夜, Gaido no Inai Yoru) (1992)
- Under the Sun (1993)
- Eien no Sur (永遠のシュール) (1994)
- Shopping (ショッピング) (with Tamio Okuda) (1997)
- Kudan (九段) (1998)
- UNITED COVER (2001)
- Cassis (カシス) (2002)
- Blue Selection(2002)
- Love Complex (2006)
- Double Drive (with Tamio Okuda) (2007)
- Maryoku (魔力) (2010)
- UNITED COVER 2 (2015)

== See also ==
- List of best-selling music artists in Japan
