= Shuichi Murakami =

Japanese jazz drummer (1951–2021)

Shuichi "Ponta" Murakami 村上 秀一
- Born: 1 January 1951; Nishinomiya, Kansai, Japan
- Died: 9 March 2021 (aged 70)
- Genres: Jazz
- Occupations: Musician, drummer

Shuichi "Ponta" Murakami (Japanese: 村上 秀一, Murakami Shuichi; 1 January 1951 – 9 March 2021) was a Japanese jazz drummer and session musician.

== Career ==
Murakami was born in Nishinomiya, Kansai, Japan. He first learned to play French horn, but switched to classical percussion as a teenager before settling on the drum kit. He worked extensively as a sideman on jazz sessions in the 1970s and 1980s, with Sadao Watanabe, Yōsuke Yamashita, Kazumi Watanabe, Masayoshi Takanaka, Jun Fukamachi, Akira Sakata, and Takashi Kako, among others. He founded the group Ponta Box (featuring sidemen Masahiro Sayama and Masatoshi Mizuno), which recorded three albums for JVC Victor and appeared at the 1995 Montreux Jazz Festival, and has recorded several albums under his own name. He also worked as a session musician for J-pop stars for several decades.

Murakami died on 9 March 2021, after suffering thalamic bleeding at the age of 70. A year later, a tribute concert titled "One Last Live" was held at the Tokyo International Forum, featuring Junk Fujiyama, Yo Hitoto, Fusanosuke Kondo, Maki Ohguro, Miho Fukuhara, Chisato Moritaka, Chikuzen Sato, Taeko Onuki, Mie, and Toshiki Kadomatsu.

== Discography ==
=== As leader ===
- Introducing Ponta Murakami (Toshiba, 1976)
- Tokyo Fusion Night (Polydor, 1978)
- Welcome To My Life (JVC, 1998)
- Rhythm Monster (Universal Music, 2012)

With Ponta Box

- Ponta Box (JVC, 1995)
- Desert in the Desert (JVC, 1995)
- NYPB (JVC, 2001)
