= Circle (Onyanko Club album) =

Studio album by Onyanko Club
- Released: 5 August 1987
- Genres: J-pop; kayōkyoku; teen pop
- Language: Japanese
- Label: Canyon Records/Kirigirisu Records

Onyanko Club chronology
Side Line (1987)	Circle (1987)

Circle is the fifth and final studio album by the Japanese girl idol girl group Onyanko Club. It was released in Japan on 5 August 1987. It is the only album from the group released by Kirigirisu Records, a label established for the group and owned jointly by Canyon Records, For Life Records, CBS/Sony Records and EPIC/Sony Records.

== Track listing ==
Disc 1
No.	Title	Artist(s)	Length
1.	"Circle (Opening)" (サークル（Opening）)
2.	"Prism" (プリズム)	Sonoko Kawai
3.	"Aoi Sketch" (碧いスケッチ)	Akie Yoshizawa
4.	"Koi no Mismatch" (恋のミスマッチ)	Eri Nitta
5.	"Akkan! Flash Up" (圧巻! FLASH UP)	Sayuri Kokushō
6.	"One Way Road" (ONE WAY ROAD)	Satomi Fukunaga
7.	"Samui Hachigatsu" (寒い8月)	Sanae Jōnouchi
8.	"Konna Sora no Shita de" (こんな空の下で)	Mamiko Takai
9.	"Kisetsu no Knock" (季節のノック)	Minayo Watanabe
10.	"Tsugi no Page o Hiraite" (次のページを開いて)	Marina Watanabe
11.	"Kaze ni Dakarete" (風に抱かれて)	Kazuko Utsumi
12.	"Chotto Honki no Timing" (ちょっとほの気のタイミング)	Yukiko Iwai
13.	"Kumo no Ue wa Itsumo" (雲の上はいつも)	Ushirogami Hikaretai
14.	"Circle (Ending)" (サークル（Ending）)

Disc 2
No.	Title	Length
1.	"One Night Only" (ONE NIGHT ONLY)
2.	"Cinderella no Shoes" (シンデレラのシューズ)
3.	"Makka na Miniskirt" (真赤なミニスカート)
4.	"Tasogare ni Kiss wo Shinai de" (黄昏にキスをしないで)
5.	"Ame no Ayatori" (雨のあやとり)
6.	"Watte Shimatta Tamago" (割ってしまった卵)
7.	"Kaze no Monogatari" (風の物語)
8.	"Shiroi Cosmos no Kei" (白いコスモスの頃)
9.	"Mikansei na Jigsaw Puzzle" (未完成なジグソーパズル)
10.	"Sekidō Tankentai" (赤道探検隊)
11.	"Aida ni Au Kamo Shirenai" (間に合うかもしれない)
12.	"Stage Door" (STAGE DOOR)

== Charts ==
=== Weekly charts ===
Chart (1987)	Peak position
Japan (Oricon)	2

== See also ==
- 1987 in Japanese music
