= Side Line =

Studio album by Onyanko Club
- Released: February 21, 1987
- Genre: J-pop; kayōkyoku; teen pop
- Length: 46:38
- Language: Japanese
- Label: Canyon Records

Onyanko Club chronology
Panic the World (1986)	Side Line (1987)	Circle (1987)

Side Line is the fourth studio album by the Japanese pop group Onyanko Club. It was released on February 21, 1987, through Canyon Records in LP and CD format. It peaked at number one on the Oricon charts and sold a total of 69,000 copies.

== Overview ==
This is the first Onyanko Club album to not contain any single A-sides. However, the B-side for "NO MORE Ren'aigokko", "Anata dake Oyasuminasai", was included. It is also the first album to feature numbers 38, 40, 41, 42, and 47, the first and last to feature numbers 43 through 46, and the last to feature numbers 6, 8, 13, 15 & 16 until the next album, Circle, was released. (Two members were not in Circle.)

== Participating members ==
- Aki Kihara (#6)
- Sayuri Kokushō (#8)
- Kazuko Utsumi (#13)
- Harumi Tomikawa (#14)
- Rika Tatsumi (singer) (#15)
- Mamiko Takai (#16)
- Sanae Jōnouchi (#17)
- Ruriko Nagata (#18)
- Yukiko Iwai (#19)
- Mako Shiraishi (#22)
- Mutsumi Yokota (#28)
- Minayo Watanabe (#29)
- Tomoko Fukawa (#33)
- Marina Watanabe (#36)
- Shizuka Kudō (#38)
- Akiko Ikuina (#40)
- Noriko Kaise (#41)
- Makiko Saitō (#42)
- Toshie Moriya (#43)
- Naoko Takada (#44)
- Yumiko Yoshida (#45)
- Sanae Nakajima (#46)
- Yuriko Yamamori (#47)

== Track listings ==
All songs written by Yasushi Akimoto, except "Shin Shin Kaiin Bangō no Uta" written by Satsuo Endō.

=== LP version ===
Side A
No.	Title	Music	Arrangement	Length
1.	"STAND UP"	Tsugutoshi Gotō	Tsugutoshi Gotō	4:54
2.	"Ame no Merry-go-round" (雨のメリーゴーランド)	Akira Mitake	Akira Mitake	3:35
3.	"Heart ni Bokin wo" (ハートに募金を) (Tomikawa, Nagata, Shiraishi, Yokota, Fukawa, Ikuina)	Ryōmei Shirai	Ryōmei Shirai	3:36
4.	"Hoshi no Ballerina" (星のバレリーナ) (Iwai, Minayo Watanabe, Marina Watanabe)	Ken Takahashi	Jun Satō	3:28
5.	"Shin Shin Kaiin Bangō no Uta" (新・新会員番号の唄)	Akira Mitake	Akira Mitake	8:45

Side B
No.	Title	Music	Arrangement	Length
1.	"Haru Ichiban ga Fuku Koro ni" (春一番が吹く頃に) (Kokushō, Utsumi, Takai)	Tsugutoshi Gotō	Jun Satō	4:01
2.	"Popcorn Batake de Tsukamaete" (ポップコーン畑でつかまえて) (Marina Watanabe, Kaise, Saitō)	Etsuko Yamakawa	Etsuko Yamakawa	3:34
3.	"Anmari ja Nai? -Koi Nashigo-" (あんまりじゃない? -恋なし子-) (Kihara, Tatsumi, Jōnouchi)	Tsugutoshi Gotō	Tsugutoshi Gotō	4:15
4.	"Dare no Sei ka na" (誰のせいかな) (Iwai, Kudō, Ikuina)	Ryōmei Shirai	Ryōmei Shirai	3:34
5.	"Anata dake Oyasuminasai" (あなただけおやすみなさい)	Kiyonori Matsuo	Ryōmei Shirai	5:15
6.	"One-Side Game" (ワンサイド・ゲーム)	Jun Satō	Jun Satō	3:41

=== CD version ===
No.	Title	Music	Arrangement	Length
1.	"STAND UP"	Tsugutoshi Gotō	Tsugutoshi Gotō	4:54
2.	"Ame no Merry-go-round" (雨のメリーゴーランド)	Akira Mitake	Akira Mitake	3:35
3.	"Heart ni Bokin wo" (ハートに募金を) (Tomikawa, Nagata, Shiraishi, Yokota, Fukawa, Ikuina)	Ryōmei Shirai	Ryōmei Shirai	3:36
4.	"Hoshi no Ballerina" (星のバレリーナ) (Iwai, Minayo Watanabe, Marina Watanabe)	Ken Takahashi	Jun Satō	3:28
5.	"Haru Ichiban ga Fuku Koro ni" (春一番が吹く頃に) (Kokushō, Utsumi, Takai)	Tsugutoshi Gotō	Jun Satō	4:01
6.	"Popcorn Batake de Tsukamaete" (ポップコーン畑でつかまえて) (Marina Watanabe, Kaise, Saitō)	Etsuko Yamakawa	Etsuko Yamakawa	3:34
7.	"Anmari ja Nai? -Koi Nashigo-" (あんまりじゃない? -恋なし子-) (Kihara, Tatsumi, Jōnouchi)	Tsugutoshi Gotō	Tsugutoshi Gotō	4:15
8.	"Dare no Sei ka na" (誰のせいかな) (Iwai, Kudō, Ikuina)	Ryōmei Shirai	Ryōmei Shirai	3:34
9.	"Anata dake Oyasuminasai" (あなただけおやすみなさい)	Kiyonori Matsuo	Ryōmei Shirai	5:15
10.	"One-Side Game" (ワンサイド・ゲーム)	Jun Satō	Jun Satō	3:41
11.	"Shin Shin Kaiin Bangō no Uta" (新・新会員番号の唄)	Akira Mitake	Akira Mitake	8:45

== Personnel ==
- Fumio Miyata – recording coordinator
- Hiroshi Saisu – recording engineer
- Tatsuya Sawada – recording engineer, remixing engineer
- Keizoh Suzuki – recording engineer
- Hiroshi Watanabe – recording director
- Kazuya Yoshida – recording engineer, remixing engineer

== See also ==
- 1987 in Japanese music
