= Panic the World =

Studio album by Onyanko Club
- Released: July 10, 1986
- Genre: J-pop; kayōkyoku; teen pop
- Language: Japanese
- Label: Canyon

Onyanko Club chronology
Yume Catalogue (1986)	Panic the World (1986)	Side Line (1987)

Singles from Panic the World
- 1. "Jā ne" Released: February 21, 1986

Panic the World (stylized as PANIC THE WORLD) is the third studio album by the Japanese girl idol girl group Onyanko Club. It was released in Japan on July 10, 1986.

== Track listing ==
Disc 1
No.	Title	Length
1.	"Otome-gokoro no Jiyū-gata" (乙女心の自由型)
2.	"Kiss wa Magic" (KISSはMAGIC)
3.	"Aki o Machibuse" (秋を待ち伏せ)
4.	"Wink de Koroshite" (ウインクで殺して)
5.	"Hishō no Mori no Tenshi-tachi" (避暑地の森の天使たち)
6.	"Taiikukan wa Dance Terrier" (体育館はダンステリア)
7.	"Natsu-yasumi wa Owaranai" (夏休みは終わらない)
8.	"Akarui Hōkago no Sugoshi Kata" (明るい放課後の過ごし方)
9.	"Kōdō Jyūdai 8km" (国道渋滞8km)
10.	"Hitomi no Tobira" (瞳の扉)

Disc 2
No.	Title	Lyrics	Music	Performer(s) / Originally released as	Length
1.	"Sailor Fuku o Nugasanai de" (セーラー服を脱がさないで)			Onyanko Club / A-side of the first single by Onyanko Club
2.	"Koi no Chapter A to Z" (恋のチャプターA to Z)			Sonoko Kawai with Onyanko club / B-side of Sonoko Kawai's debut single "Namida no Jasmin Love"
3.	"Natsu no Christmas" (夏のクリスマス)			Onyanko Club / Album track from Kick Off
4.	"Makka na Jitensha" (真赤な自転車)			Onyanko Club / Album track from Kick Off
5.	"Ushiro-yubi-sasare-gumi" (うしろゆびさされ組)		Onyanko Club ・ Ushiro-yubi-sasare-gumi / A-side of the debut single by Ushiro-yubi-sasare-gumi
6.	"Oyoshi ni Natte ne Teacher" (およしになってねTEACHER)		Onyanko Club / A-side of the second single by Onyanko Club
7.	"Fuyu no Opera Glass" (冬のオペラグラス)			Eri Nitta / A-side of Eri Nitta's debut single
8.	"Koi wa Ring Ring Ring" (恋はRing Ring Ring)			Sayuri Kokushō, B-side of Sayuri Kokushō's debut single "Valentine Kiss"
9.	"Jā ne" (じゃあね)			Onyanko Club / A-side of the third single by Onyanko Club
10.	"Watashi wa Rika-chan" (私は里歌ちゃん)	Nyangilas / A-side of the debut single by Nyangilas
11.	"Kaiin Bangō no Uta" (会員番号の唄)	Onyanko Club / B-side of Akie Yoshizawa's second single "Kisetsu Hazure no Koi"

== Charts ==
=== Weekly charts ===
Chart (1986)	Peak position
Japan (Oricon)	3

== See also ==
- 1986 in Japanese music
