= Shūkan Bunshun smoking scandal =

1985 entertainment scandal in Japan

The Shūkan Bunshun smoking scandal (or Onyanko club smoking scandal) of 1985 involved smoking by underage members of the Japanese female idol group Onyanko Club (おニャン子クラブ, Onyanko Kurabu; "Kitty Club"). It is one of the best known scandals in the history of Japanese idols, and changed the form and fate of Onyanko Club, which became Japan's biggest female idol group in the 1980s.

== The circumstances of the scandal ==
On April 1, 1985, Japanese Fuji Television Network launched a variety show called "Sunset Meow Meow" (夕やけニャンニャン, Yūyake Nyan Nyan) during which the program's exclusive female idol group, Onyanko Club, made its debut.

Two weeks after the program started, a photograph was published by Shūkan Bunshun which depicted the under age band members smoking. On April 18, the April 25, 1985 issue of Shūkan Bunshun appeared, with an article titled "The scene that the high school girls' squad of the popular TV show Yuyake Nyan Nyan doesn't show to their parents and the station" (人気番組「夕やけニャンニャン」女子高生隊の、親と局には見せないシーン), Ninkibangumiyūyakenyannyan Joshikōseitaino Oyatokyokuniwa Misenaishiin) with the photo. The six members in the photo were Mika Okuda (奥田美香, Okuda Mika)(membership number 1, 17 years old), Michiko Enokida (榎田道子, Enokida Michiko)(membership number 2, 17 years old), Kayoko Yoshino (吉野佳代子, Yoshino Kayoko)(membership number 3, 18 years old), Aki Kihara (樹原亜紀, Kihara Aki)(membership number 6, 16 years old), Mamiko Tomoda (友田麻美子, Tomoda Mamiko)(membership number 7, 17 years old), and Mayumi Satō (佐藤真由美, Satō Mayumi)(membership number 10, 17 years old).

As a result of the photograph, the girls were forced to leave the program as of April 18. On April 25, five of the six members were dismissed from Onyanko Club. As a result, they became known as the Smoking Group (喫煙組, Kitsuen Gumi). Of the five, three were suspended by their high schools and one was expelled. Mamiko Tomoda was not punished by her school Bunka Gakuin because this was an Upper secondary specialized training school (専修学校高等課程). On the other hand, Mika Okuda subsequently claimed that she too had not been punished by her high school. When they were photographed, one of them said that it was fine to quit Onyanko Club, but what if the school found out?

Aki Kihara was the only member who escaped dismissal and returned to the program after two weeks of suspension. Mika Okuda was the only one who was clearly seen smoking in the published photo. In Mayumi Satō's case, only her skirt was in the photo. Tomoda said she herself was not smoking at that time. However, since she regularly smoked, and said so to the program's officials. Back then, she believed that smoking cigarettes was a shortcut to adulthood. The other members also admitted that they regularly smoked. Kihara, by contrast, denied ever smoking.

Hiroshi Ishida (石田弘, Ishida Hiroshi), the producer of the program, was advising the members of Onyanko Club to lead a healthy lifestyle. He also warned them in advance to be wary of paparazzi activities by weekly photo magazines such as Friday and FOCUS (フォーカス). In addition to the photograph of the smoking scene, Shūkan Bunshun also posted a photograph of the five members, including Okuda, Kihara and Tomoda, with "No Smoking" in the background, taken in the Fuji TV building before the smoking photograph was taken. Therefore, from the outset of the program, they were pursuing the members of Onyanko Club. This scandal led to the program facing the danger of being terminated.

== Tomoda's testimony ==
On June 3, 2016, Mamiko Tomoda appeared publicly for the first time in 31 years to talk about the scandal on TBS Television's program Explosive Reports! The Friday (爆報！THEフライデー). According to Tomoda, as they were talking in a coffee shop, they relaxed and smoked without paying attention to their surroundings. At around 9:10 pm, a man suddenly appeared, took a photograph without revealing his identity, thanked them, and then ran off. They immediately realized the gravity of the situation and chased after the man, but couldn't find him. They were in trouble, so they explained the situation to one of the program's staff members on a payphone. They were then called back to Fuji TV and given a stern warning. The photographer was unidentified, and they were not sure if the photograph would be released, so the girls were allowed to appear on the program the next day. However, Shūkan Bunshun informed Fuji TV that the photograph would be published. It did so on April 18, and the girls were forced to leave the program.

A few months after this scandal, Onyanko Club released their debut song, "Sailor Fuku wo Nugasanai de" ("Don't Make Me Take Off My Sailor Suit") (セーラー服を脱がさないで, Sērāfuku o Nugasanai de), and their popularity greatly increased. As a result, Yūyake Nyan Nyan was expanded from a local program aired in Tokyo and some other areas to be broadcast nationwide. According to "Bakuhō! The Friday", Tomoda was regarded as the ace of Onyanko Club until this scandal came to light. She was scheduled to be the main vocalist of the debut song, and the other girls of the smoking group were also considered core members. Sayuri Kokusho, one of the leaders of Onyanko Club, admitted this. Kazuji Kasai, the chief director of the program, also said, "If they had stayed, the trend of Onyanko Club would have been changed. Therefore, this is regarded as the scandal that changed the form and fate of Onyanko Club. On the other hand, according to Kasai, the program's officials started discussing a new theme song for the program, which would replace The Checkers' song, right around the time the smoking scandal came to light. He stated that at this point, it had not yet been decided that the theme song would be sung by Onyanko Club

Eri Nitta, who became one of the main vocalists for "Sailor Fuku wo Nugasanai de", was only involved in the program part-time when it first started. This was very different from the girls of the smoking group, who were said to be all stylish and professional-minded members. She felt out of place on the show, and wanted to quit. However, with the smoking group removed, the atmosphere made it almost impossible for her to say anything about quitting. She decided to continue. Then she became the most popular member of the early Onyanko Club.

== Enokida's testimony ==
On December 8, 2017, Michiko Enokida also appeared on "Bakuhō! The Friday" and she spoke about the scandal. Back then, she used to frequently go to discos after finishing the program. According to Mamiko Takai, the members of Onyanko Club were not allowed to go to discos. In addition, she was the leader of the smoking group. Tomoda, on the other hand, was not usually a member of the smoking group. But only on the day they were photographed, Enokida invited Tomoda to join her group. When Enokida met Tomoda for the first time in 32 years, she deeply apologized to Tomoda for ruining the career of such a beautiful idol. Tomoda replied that she didn't mind.

== Okuda's testimony ==
In July 1986, some time after her dismissal, Mika Okuda revealed in the weekly magazine Shūkan Post (週刊ポスト) that there was another Onyanko member who had smoked several times in the TV station in addition to the members of the smoking group, and that smoking was normal among the members of Onyanko Club.

== Testimony by the program's officials ==
As of April 18, 1985, when the girls of the smoking group were forced to leave the program, Hiroshi Ishida, the producer of the program, said that he would let the girls back on the program as soon as they showed remorse so that their careers would not be ruined. But after the scandal came to light, the program's officials had meetings with the girls' parents and school teachers, and were asked not to show the girls on the program any more. As a result, the girls had no choice but to quit, they claimed. Okuda complained about being fired even though the program's officials had said the girls including her would be reinstated. Furthermore, according to Tomoda, she was fired unilaterally without any official explanation from the program's officials and without any chance to contact the other members of the smoking group after she was forced to leave the program.

Kazuji Kasai, the chief director of the program, was considered to be the behind-the-scenes organizer of Onyanko Club, and was most feared by its members. He had accepted that smoking was normal for high school students at the time. However, when the photograph was made public, he was terribly confused. He said that he wished that Shūkan Bunshun had at least blurred the girls' faces as they were underage. He also remembered that he felt really sorry for the girls, who were all pleasant, and that he was still worried about them.
