= Ushiroyubi Sasaregumi =

Japanese pop music duo

- Origin: Japan
- Genre: Pop
- Years active: 1985–1987
- Past members: Yukiko Iwai; Mamiko Takai

Ushiroyubi Sasaregumi (うしろゆびさされ組) was a female Japanese pop music duo consisting of Yukiko Iwai and Mamiko Takai, formed in 1985. In parallel to their membership in this duo, Iwai and Takai were at the same time members of Onyanko Club, a large pop group widely seen as a precursor to groups such as Morning Musume and AKB48. Onyanko Club sang back-up vocals on some of the songs released by Ushiroyubi Sasaregumi. They are most notable for singing several of the theme songs for the anime television series High School! Kimengumi. Ushiroyubi Sasaregumi debuted on Yūyake Nyan Nyan("Sunset Meow Meow") (夕やけニャンニャン) on 30 September 1985. Throughout their short-lived career, the group released six singles, three albums, a promotion video, and two photo books (in addition to the Kimengumi soundtrack albums). The group disbanded after Takai's graduation from Onyanko Club on 5 April 1987.

== History ==
At first, this subgroup was called Kiwi Gumi (キウイ組, Kiui Gumi). They printed 30,000 record jackets for their debut song under this name, but the name was hastily changed to Ushiroyubi Sasaregumi due to a change of heart on the part of Kazuji Kasai, chief director of Yūyake Nyan Nyan, supervisor of Onyanko Club. According to Kasai, the reason Takai and Iwai were selected was because they resembled the heroines in the anime "High School Kimengumi". On the other hand, it is said that it was simply because they were going in the same direction to return home. They often took a cab home together after appearing on Yūyake Nyan Nyan.

The subgroup had a somewhat unusual appearance, due to the difference in height between Iwai and Takai. Takai was the taller one of the two, with a height of about 5' 2" (about 157.5 cm), while Iwai barely reached 4' 11" (about 150 cm), so the height difference was remarkable. The contrast between Takai, who is reputed to be one of the most popular and beautiful girls in Onyanko Club, and Iwai, who is said to be a cute character like those in Anime, was also a topic of conversation. The debut song, released in October 1985, with the same title as the subgroup's name, was No. 5 on the Oricon chart. However, the five singles subsequently released all reached No. 1. They also released feature-length promotional video titled Magical Ushiroyubi Tour (マジカルうしろゆびツアー, Majikaru ushiroyubi Tsuā), filmed in Brazil.

In April 1987, Takai graduated from Onyanko Club, and Ushiroyubi Sasaregumi also disbanded. On this occasion, they both said that it was a very pleasant memory and that they loved this subgroup. On the other hand, It is said that Takai and Iwai did not get along well. Kasai claimed that although they had differences in orientation, they were not as incompatible as thought. however, Iwai herself subsequently admitted on a TV program that she and Takai did not get along well.

== Discography ==
=== Singles ===
All singles were released as EP singles.

- Ushiroyubi Sasaregumi (うしろゆびさされ組) / A School Girl's Decision (女学生の決意, Jogakusei no Ketsui)
  (5 October 1985, 7A0525, Canyon)
- Banana Tears (バナナの涙, Banana no Namida) / Abunai Sa•Ka•Na (あぶないサ・カ・ナ)
  (21 January 1986, 7A0550, Canyon)
- Mr. Elephant's Scanty (象さんのすきゃんてぃ, Zō-san no Sukyanti) / Nekojita Kokoro mo Koi no Uchi (猫舌こころも恋のうち)
  (2 May 1986, 7A0577, Canyon)
- Nagisa no "......" (渚の『・・・・・』, Nagisa no Kagikakko) / Not Only ★ But Also (のっとおんりぃ★ばっとおるそう, Notto Onri Batto Orusō)
  (27 August 1986, 7A0628, Canyon)
- Waza Ari! (技ありっ!) / I'm Puzzling (わたしは知恵の輪, Watashi wa Pazuringu)
  (23 November 1986, 7A0666, Canyon)
- Kashiko (かしこ) / Beating Pythagoras (ピタゴラスをぶっとばせ, Pitagorasu o Buttobase)
  (21 February 1987, 7A0686, Canyon)

=== Albums ===
- Fuwafura (ふ・わ・ふ・ら)
  (5 June 1986, C28A0495 (LP), 28P6545 (cassette), D32A0189 (CD), Canyon)
- An Balancing Toy (AN bALANCING TOY, An Baranshingu Toi)
  (15 December 1986, C28A0536 (LP), 28P6612 (cassette), D32A0248 (CD), Canyon)
- Unlimited (∞, Anrimiteddo)
  (5 June 1986, C28A0555 (LP), ? (cassette), D32A0276 (CD), Canyon)

==== Collection albums ====
- My Collection: Ushiroyubi Sasaregumi Best (MY これ！クション うしろゆびさされ組BEST, Mai Kore!kushon: Ushiroyubi Sasaregumi Besuto)
  (5 December 2001, Pony Canyon)
- Our Best: Ushiroyubi Encyclopedia Package 1: Ushiroyubi Sasaregumi (ぼくらのベスト うしろゆび大百科 package1 うしろゆびさされ組, Bokura no Besuto: Ushiroyubi Daihyakka Pakeiji Wan: Ushiroyubi Sasaregumi)
  (19 May 2004, PCCA-02036 (CD + DVD of Magical Ushiroyubi Tour), Pony Canyon)

==== Kimengumi albums ====
The High School! Kimengumi soundtrack albums were produced jointly for the anime with Onyanko Club, Musukko Club, and Ushirogami Hikaretai

- High School! Kimengumi Music Collection (ハイスクール！奇面組 音楽組, Haisukūru! Kimengumi Ongakugumi)
  (21 February 1986, C25G0411 (LP), Canyon)
- High School! Kimengumi Music Collection 2 (ハイスクール！奇面組 音楽組2, Haisukūru! Kimengumi Ongakugumi Tsū)
  (21 July 1986, D30G-0034 (CD), Canyon)
- High School! Kimengumi Original Theme Song Collection (ハイスクール！奇面組 オリジナルテーマ・ソング組, Haisukūru! Kimengumi Orijinaru Tēma Songu Gumi)
  (21 October 1987, D32G0067 (CD), Pony Canyon)
- High School! Kimengumi Theme Song Collection Plus (ハイスクール！奇面組 テーマ・ソング組＋, Haisukūru! Kimengumi Tēma Songu Gumi Purasu)
  (17 March 1999, PCCG-00489 (CD), Pony Canyon)

== Videography ==
- マジカルうしろゆびツアー [Magical Ushiroyubi Tour] (Videotape) (in Japanese). Tokyo, Japan: Pony Canyon. 1987-03-29. ASIN B01N141LVQ.

== Voice acting ==
- High School! Kimengumi (ep.63, as themselves)
