= Kick-off =

Kick-off, kickoff, or kick off may refer to:

== Sport ==
- Kick-off (association football), the method of starting a match or restarting after half-time or a scored goal
  - Kick Off (magazine), a South African football magazine
  - Kick Off (series), a series of computer association football games
- Kickoff (gridiron football), the method of starting a game or other drive in American football and Canadian football
- Kick-in, also referred to as a kick-off, a procedure in Australian rules football to restart the game after a behind has been scored

== Music ==
- Kick Off (album), a 1985 album by Onyanko Club
- "Kick-Off", a song by Relient K from the 2001 album The Anatomy of the Tongue in Cheek

== Other ==
- Kickoff meeting
