= Yukiko Iwai =

Yukiko Iwai may refer to:

- Yukiko Iwai (voice actress) (born 1972), Japanese voice actress
- Yukiko Iwai (singer) (born 1968), Japanese singer and actress
