= Wedding Dress (Onyanko Club song) =

Single by Onyanko Club
- Language: Japanese
- A-side: "Wedding Dress"
- B-side: "Watashi o Yoroshiku"
- Released: August 21, 1987
- Label: Kirigirisu
- Composer: Ken Takahashi
- Lyricist: Yasushi Akimoto

Onyanko Club singles chronology
"Katatsumuri Samba" (1987)	"Wedding Dress" (1987)	"Shōmikigen" (2002)

"Wedding Dress" (ウェディングドレス) is the 9th and final single by the Japanese idol girl group Onyanko Club. It was released in Japan on August 21, 1987. It was also the only single to be released by Kirigirisu Records.

== Outline ==
The single was subsequently used as a retirement song for members 14 (Harumi Tomikawa), 19 (Ruriko Nagata), 22 (Mako Shiraishi), 28 (Mutsumi Yokota), and 33 (Tomoko Fukawa), as they would all go on to retire from show business.

The B side, Watashi o Yoroshiku, contained the same main vocals as the A side.

== Track listing ==
All lyrics are written by Yasushi Akimoto.

No.	Title	Music	Length
1.	"Wedding Dress" (ウェディングドレス)	Ken Takahashi
2.	"Watashi o Yoroshiku" (私をよろしく)	Tsugutoshi Gotō

== Charts ==
=== Weekly charts ===
Chart (1987)	Peak position
Japan (Oricon)	2

== See also ==
- 1987 in Japanese music
