= Onyanko Club =

Japanese idol group (1985–1987)

Onyanko Club おニャン子クラブ
- Members of Onyanko Club with the main cast of Sukeban Deka II

Background information
- Origin: Tokyo, Japan
- Genres: J-pop; kayōkyoku; teen pop
- Years active: 1985–1987; 2002; 2010
- Labels: Canyon Records; Kirigirisu
- Spinoffs: Nyangilas; Ushirogami Hikaretai; Ushiroyubi Sasaregumi; Musukko Club
- Past members: See below

Onyanko Club (おニャン子クラブ, Onyanko Kurabu; "Kitty Club") was a large all-girl Japanese pop idol group in the 1980s. Some members of the group participated in spin-off groups, such as Nyangilas, Ushiroyubi Sasaregumi and Ushirogami Hikaretai. Many of the latter two groups' songs were used as theme songs of the popular 1980s anime series High School! Kimengumi and Tsuide ni Tonchinkan. Several big-name idols stemmed from the group; one of the best known being Shizuka Kudo. The group was produced by Hiroshi Ishida and Kazuji Kasai, both of whom were producers of Fuji TV's show Yūyake Nyan Nyan.

== History ==
=== 1985 ===
The group made its television debut on the first episode of Fuji TV's daily live television variety show "Sunset Meow Meow" (夕やけニャンニャン, Yūyake Nyan Nyan) on 1 April 1985. The show was aired from 5 p.m. to 6 p.m. Monday to Friday. In the beginning, the group consisted of nine high school girls and two high school graduates, namely Sayuri Kokushō (number 8) and Satomi Fukunaga (number 11). They were selected from participants in two special episodes of Fuji TV's weekly late-night show All Night Fuji. The two episodes entitled All Night Fuji: High School Girl Special (オールナイトフジ女子高生スペシャル, Ōru Naito Fuji Joshi Kōsei Supesharu) were produced as pilots of the show Yūyake Nyan Nyan and aired on 23 February and 16 March 1985. Yūyake Nyan Nyan had a segment where five candidates participated in a five-day long audition for becoming a new Onyanko Club member. Most of the Onyanko Club members except the first 11 members and other members who joined the group through the 1986 Miss Seventeen Contest were admitted to the group by winning the audition.

Every day since 15 April 1985, Tsurutarō Kataoka, a host of the program, had been provoking Dump Matsumoto, a female professional wrestler who is well known as a heel, by abusing her over the phone. On 19 April, while he was provoking her as usual, Matsumoto suddenly burst into the studio with a Shinai in her hand. Kataoka fled around the studio, then timidly repeated his apology to her. Seeing this, Onyanko Club members Sayuri Kokushō, Mika Nagoya, Satomi Fukunaga, and Sonoko Kawai broke into tears. This happening is considered one of the highlights of the program.

==== Smoking scandal and single releases ====
Less than three weeks from the launch of the show, six members were caught in photos taken by a photographer of tabloid magazine Shūkan Bunshun while they were hanging out and smoking in a kissaten (Japanese-style café) near Fuji TV's old headquarters in Shinjuku, Tokyo. They stopped appearing on the show from 18 April. Eventually, five of them were officially dismissed from the group without announcement as a result of underage smoking as of 25 April; one member was not smoking in the incident.

The group's debut single "Sailor Fuku o Nugasanai de" was premiered on Yūyake Nyan Nyan on 3 June. Lead vocalists (hereinafter referred to as "front vocals") for the single were Eri Nitta (number 4), Miharu Nakajima (number 5), Satomi Fukunaga (number 11) and Kazuko Utsumi (number 13). Released by Canyon Records on 5 July, the single debuted at number 34 on the Oricon's Japanese single chart (the national single chart) and peaked at number five in its sixth week of release in August. A day before the single's release date, a release and handshake event was scheduled at Sunshine City in Ikebukuro, Tokyo. The event was expected to have an attendance of about 500 people. However, over 4,000 people showed up at the site. As a result of reported injury and concerns over possible stampede, the event was canceled at the last minute before a scheduled start time.

In the same month, the group's member Sonoko Kawai (number 12) made her appearance as a supporting character in the episodes 11 and 12 of Fuji TV's live-action TV series Sukeban Deka. Subsequently, it was announced on Yūyake Nyan Nyan that Kawai's first solo single would be released in September. The single "Namida no Jasmine LOVE" and its B-side "Koi no Chapter A to Z" were premiered on Yūyake Nyan Nyan on 12 August and 19 August, respectively. The B-side features four Onyanko Club members as backing vocals: Sayuri Kokusho (number 8), Mika Nagoya (number 9), Mamiko Takai (number 16) and Sanae Jōnouchi (number 17). In late August, producers of the show Yūyake Nyan Nyan teamed up with producers of the live-action TV series Sukeban Deka and held a special audition on Yūyake Nyan Nyan to look for a new Onyanko Club member who would play a main character in a sequel to the TV series. The winner of the audition was Akie Yoshizawa, who was assigned number 25. A day before the release of Kawai's first single, a release event entitled "Nyan Touch Love Party" for the single was held at Yomiuri Land EAST in Inagi, Tokyo on 31 August.

Released by CBS/Sony Records on 1 September, Kawai's first single debuted at number five on the chart and topped the chart for the following two consecutive weeks. On 21 September, the group's first studio album Kick Off was released by Canyon Records. The album was directed by Hiroshi Watanabe (music producer) and contained 10 songs whose music was composed by several musicians, such as Jun Sato, Ken Takahashi, Etsuko Yamakawa, Kiyonori Matsuo and Tsugutoshi Goto, who all composed and arranged most of the group's and members' songs thereafter. All lyrics of the album were written by Yasushi Akimoto. The album reached number two on the Oricon's Japanese album chart and remained in the top 100 for 30 weeks. On 30 September, the group's first subgroup Ushiroyubi Sasaregumi made its television debut on Yūyake Nyan Nyan. Its members were Mamiko Takai and Yukiko Iwai (number 19).

The official fan club "Konyanko Club" run by Fujipacific Music was launched on 1 October. The number of fan club members peaked at about 190,000 during its operation. On 5 October, Onyanko Club had its first concert entitled "Kick Off" at Hibiya Yagai Ongakudo in Chiyoda, Tokyo. It was recorded and released as a video by Pony Inc. in the following month.

On the same day as the first concert, Ushiroyubi Sasaregumi's first single "Ushiroyubi Sasaregumi" was released by Canyon Records. The single and its B-side were used as the opening theme and ending theme, respectively, of Fuji TV's anime High School! Kimengumi, which was adaptation from the manga series. One of the reasons why Takai and Iwai were selected for the subgroup was that their images matched the anime's two girl characters named Kawa Yui and Uru Chie. Originally the subgroup was named "Kiwi-Gumi". 30,000 copies of the first single's front cover insert were printed with the name before Kazuji Kasai, a producer of Yūyake Nyan Nyan, decided to change it to Ushiroyubi Sasaregumi, which was part of the song's lyrics written by Akimoto. The first single peaked at number five on the Japanese single chart. On 21 October, Onyanko Club's second single "Oyoshi ni Natte ne Teacher" was released by Canyon Records. It debuted at number two on the single chart.

On 1 November, Yoshizawa's first solo single "Naze? no Arashi" was released by For Life Records under the name of "Yoshizawa Akie with Onyanko Club". Four Onyanko Club members Aki Kihara (number 6), Mika Nagoya, Harumi Tomikawa (number 14) and Ruriko Nagata (number 18) were selected as backing vocals for the single. Although their backing vocals actually were not recorded in the single, the members were pictured on the back cover of the 7-inch single and always performed with Yoshizawa on Yūyake Nyan Nyan and in the single release events as well as Onyanko Club's concerts. The song was used as the ending theme of Fuji TV's live-action TV series Sukeban Deka II: Shōjo Tekkamen Densetsu for the episodes 1 to 15. Yoshizawa played one of the three main characters of the TV series aired from 7 November 1985, to 23 October 1986. The single peaked at number eight on the single chart.

In November, producers of Yūyake Nyan Nyan teamed up with producers of Nippon Broadcasting System's radio show Miyake Yuuji no Yangu Paradaisu (Yuuji Miyake's Young Paradise) and held a special audition on Yūyake Nyan Nyan to look for new Onyanko Club members who would be campaign girls for the radio show. The winner of the audition was Mutsumi Yokota, who was assigned number 28. Minayo Watanabe, Chiaki Mikami and Yuko Yajima, who all were runners-up of the audition, also became Onyanko Club members and were assigned numbers 29, 30 and 31, respectively. Note that in November, the program was only aired for about 10 days due to the broadcast of 1985 FIVB Volleyball Men's World Cup and 1985 FIVB Volleyball Women's World Cup.

In the fall and winter of 1985, Kawai expanded her solo activities with her second single "Ochiba no Crescendo" released on 21 November and her first solo album Sonoko released on 5 December both by CBS/Sony Records. She also started appearing as a supporting character in Fuji TV's drama TV series The Mirror of Janus (ヤヌスの鏡), which was adaptation from the manga series, aired from 4 December 1985, to 16 April 1986, and had her first solo concert at Gold Hall at Shinagawa Prince Hotel in Shinagawa, Tokyo on 28 December. The concert was recorded and released as a video by CBS/Sony Home Video in March 1986.

=== 1986 ===
Premiered on Yūyake Nyan Nyan on 16 December 1985, and released by Canyon Records on 1 January 1986, Onyanko Club member number 4 Eri Nitta's first solo single "Fuyu no Operagrasu" debuted at number one on the single chart and remained number one for the four consecutive weeks. The number of its sales exceeded that of any of Onyanko Club-related singles released earlier. On 21 January, Ushiroyubi Sasaregumi's second single "Banana no Namida" was released by Canyon Records. It debuted at number one on the single chart and was used as the ending theme of Fuji TV's anime High School! Kimengumi. In the same month, Onyanko Club member number 8 Sayuri Kokusho started performing her first solo single "Valentine Kiss" on Yūyake Nyan Nyan. Two Onyanko Club members Mako Shiraishi (number 22) and Minayo Watanabe were selected as backing vocals for the single. Released by CBS/Sony Records under the name of "Kokusho Sayuri with Onyanko Club" on 1 February, the single debuted at number two on the single chart.

In February, it was announced on Yūyake Nyan Nyan that the group's two members Miharu Nakajima and Sonoko Kawai would "graduate" from the group in April. Nakajima, who was graduating from high school in March, decided to retire from the music and entertainment industry and go to college to become a dental hygienist, while Kawai would move on to pursue her solo career as a singer and later a singer-songwriter. The Japanese word "sotsugyou" (卒業, "graduation") was used by the group for the first time in the Japanese pop music industry to describe departure of members from an idol group or a band. The reason for the use of the Japanese word was that the group and its activities were revolving around a concept that it was a student club that engaged in show business activities as extracurricular activities.

As one of the rules for Onyanko Club members was that they had to attend high school and maintain good grades to be able to remain in the group. There were members who were dismissed from the group by producers of Yūyake Nyan Nyan in violation of the rule by quitting school. Members also had to take their time off from appearing on the daily TV show and participating in other activities of the group during their respective schools' midterm exams and final exams as well as during times for exam preparation. Moreover, having to give priority to their studies over the group's show business activities resulted in significant restrictions on several member's activities. For example, Mutsumi Yokota had to refrain from appearing on the daily TV show since winning the aforementioned audition until she graduated from her high school in March 1986 as a result of the school's restrictions on her show business activities. For the same reason, Harumi Tomikawa also was not allowed to appear on the TV show from January to May 1986 even though she was able to participate in the group's certain activities, such as photo shoots, recording sessions and concert performances.

Onyanko Club's third single "Jā ne" was released by Canyon Records on 21 February. It was named after Japanese word "jā ne (じゃあね)", which is a casual way of saying "goodbye", and was a farewell song to Nakajima, who was leaving the group in April. Moreover, it was originally planned to be released under the name of "Nakajima Miharu with Onyanko Club" as her first and last solo single. However, Nakajima suggested releasing it as the group's third single. It debuted at number one on the single chart. On 1 March, Yoshizawa's second single "Kisetsu Hazure no Koi" was released by For Life Records. It topped the single chart for two consecutive weeks. The B-side of the single is "Kaiin Bangou no Uta", which literally means "The Song of Membership Numbers". It was performed by and recorded with all 22 remaining members of Onyanko Club at that time. The song is credited to Onyanko Club and consists of four choruses and 22 verses, each verse sung by each member individually about herself for approximately 14 seconds. The music of the song was composed by Akira Mitake, who composed many of the group's and members' songs. The lyrics of the song was written by Akimoto. On 10 March, the group's second studio album Yume Catalogue was released by Canyon Records. It topped the Oricon's Japanese album chart. The second album features songs sung by various combinations of members, some of whom had solo vocal parts for the first time in the group's recordings, such as "Suki ni Nattemo Kurenai" sung by Aki Kihara, Mika Nagoya and Rika Tatsumi (number 15) and "Ren'ai Omimai Moushiagemasu" sung by Harumi Tomikawa, Sanae Jounouchi and Ruriko Nagata.

The group's first nationwide concert tour began at Hokkaido Kosei Nenkin Kaikan in Sapporo, Hokkaido on 16 March. Subsequently, they performed in Hiroshima, Nagoya, Sendai, Osaka and Tokyo and had 14 shows in total with a total of 96,673 attendees in the whole tour. Tickets of the first concert tour didn't get to general sale as they were sold out to fan club "Konyanko Club" members only. On 21 March, Kawai's third single "Aoi Stashion" was released by CBS/Sony Records. It topped the single chart for two consecutive weeks and eventually became the most successful single out of all of the group's and member's singles released while the group was active. On Yūyake Nyan Nyan aired on 31 March, a "graduation ceremony" for Nakajima and Kawai was held, which was recorded earlier as on the same day the group was having two shows a day at Nippon Budokan in Chiyoda, Tokyo as part of the nationwide concert tour. On 1 April, which was the final date of the tour, Nakajima and Kawai concluded their activities as Onyanko Club members with three shows a day at Nippon Budokan. The concert at Nippon Budokan was recorded and aired on Fuji TV on 5 April as well as released as a video by Pony Inc. in May 1986.

On the same day as the final date of the concert tour, Nyangilas' first single "Watashi wa Rika-chan" was released by Warner-Pioneer. The subgroup's members were Aki Kihara, Mika Nagoya, Rika Tatsumi and Mako Shiraishi. Prior to the subgroup formation, there was a segment on Yūyake Nyan Nyan aired in November 1985 where the show's hosts and panelists had a debate over whether Kihara, Nagoya and Tatsumi should form a subgroup and have their own songs for release. Although the three members were up for the idea, at that time it was generally perceived that they were not good singers or exceptionally popular members compared to other members, such as Sonoko Kawai and Eri Nitta. At the same time they were perceived as more humorous and cheerful than other members. Among the panelists, Yasushi Akimoto, who later wrote lyrics of all of Nyangilas' songs including its album songs, supported the idea, and eventually producers of Yūyake Nyan Nyan decided to make it happen with Shiraishi added, who they thought would make the subgroup more appealing to wider audiences. The first single was released on April Fools' Day, which was intended as a joke, and went straight to number one on the single chart, keeping popular Japanese boy band Shonentai's much anticipated second single off from the number-one spot. Tatsumi later said that as both singles were released by the same record label, the boy band's A&R executive got mad at her and her bandmates, saying that the boy band was supposed to get the number-one spot.

Nitta's second single "Koi no Rope wo Hodokanaide" was released by Canyon Records on 10 April. Originally its B-side "Pink no Ribbon" was decided to be a A-side. However, Nitta objected to it, and as a result Tsugutoshi Goto, who was the composer and arranger of both songs, had to revise "Koi no Rope wo Hodokanaide" for making it suitable for the A-side. It topped the single chart for two consecutive weeks. On 21 April, Onyanko Club's fourth single "Otto Chikan!" was released by Canyon Records. Front vocals for the single were Satomi Fukunaga, Kazuko Utsumi, Sanae Jounouchi, Ruriko Nagata and Mutsumi Yokota. It topped the single chart.

Fuji TV's weekly live television variety show Yūshoku Nyan Nyan starring the group and featuring presenters, one of whom was Kawai, was launched on 2 May. It was aired from 7 p.m. to 7:30 p.m. every Friday and was very similar to Yūyake Nyan Nyan in their contents except that the weekly show was intended to promote Musukko Club, which was an all-boy idol group and intended as a boy version of Onyanko Club. The weekly show was short-lived and lasted until 19 September. In the same month, Ushiroyubi Sasaregumi's third single "Zousan no Sukyantee" and Kokusho's second single "Natsu wo Matenai" were released by Canyon Records and CBS/Sony Records, respectively. Both singles topped the single chart.

Satomi Fukunaga's first solo single "Kaze no Invitation" was released by Canyon Records on 21 May. Prior to her performance of the song for promotion on Yūyake Nyan Nyan since the mid-May, it had already been premiered two months earlier during the group's first nationwide tour in March. On 25 May, a release event entitled "Satomi Invitation" for the single was held at Yomiuri Land EAST with a total of about 6,500 attendees, 1,500 of whom were lining up overnight for entry. The single debuted at number one on the single chart.

Onyanko Club member number 17 Sanae Jounouchi's first solo single "Ajisai Bashi" was released by CBS/Sony Records on 11 June. The single was categorized as enka, which is a Japanese music genre and considered as traditional Japanese popular music as opposed to other music genres influenced by Western pop and rock music. It debuted at number one on the Oricon's Japanese single chart. It was the first instance in the chart's history that a single in the category of enka went straight to number one on the single chart in the first week of release. As of 2023 the single remains as the only debut single in the category of enka that debuted at number one on the single chart.

Nyangilas' second single "Jibun de Yuunomo Nandesukeredo" was released by Warner-Pioneer on 21 June. It went straight to number one on the single chart, making all of Nyangilas' singles number-one singles. On 25 June, Mamiko Takai's first solo single "Cinderella-tachi e no Dengon" was released by Canyon Records while she still was the member of Ushiroyubi Sasaregumi. It debuted at number one on the single chart.

Onyanko Club member number 29 Minayo Watanabe's first solo single "Hitomi ni Yakusoku" was premiered on Yūyake Nyan Nyan on 2 July. A release event entitled "The First and Last Touch in Budokan" for the single was held at Nippon Budokan with a total of about 12,000 attendees on 5 July. On 10 July, Onyanko Club's third album Panic the World was released as a double album by Canyon Records. It consists of the original studio album with 10 newly released songs and a greatest hits compilation album with 11 songs previously released by Canyon Records, CBS/Sony Records, For Life Records and Warner-Pioneer. The double album reached number three on the Oricon's album chart. Meanwhile, Watanabe's first single was released by CBS/Sony Records on 16 July and debuted at number one on the single chart.

The group's second nationwide concert tour entitled "Onyanko Panic" began at Yokohama Stadium in Yokohama, Kanagawa on 19 July. In the stadium concert, the group announced on stage that five members Eri Nitta, Mika Nagoya, Satomi Fukunaga, Akie Yoshizawa and Kumiko Susan Yamamoto (number 32) would "graduate" from the group in September. Nitta, Nagoya, Fukunaga and Yoshizawa would move on to pursue their solo careers as a singer and/or actress while Yamamoto decided to retire from the music and entertainment industry and finish college. On 21 and 22 July, the group had more stadium concerts at Hankyu Nishinomiya Stadium in Nishinomiya, Hyogo. For the second tour, they subsequently performed in Hiroshima, Nagoya, Shizuoka, Fukuoka, Niigata, Fukui, Nagano, Sendai and Sapporo in August and in Tokyo in September. On 21 July, Onyanko Club's fifth single "Osaki ni Shitsurei" was released by Canyon Records. Front vocals for the single were Harumi Tomikawa, Yukiko Iwai, Tomoko Fukawa (number 33) and Marina Watanabe (number 36). The single went straight to number one on the single chart.

Onyanko Club's movie Onyanko the Movie: Kiki Ippatsu! starring all members as the group was released in theaters nationwide by Toho Pictures on 23 August. It was directed by Masato Harada and played as a double feature with film Sorobanzuku starring Japanese comedy duo Tunnels, who also was a regular on Yūyake Nyan Nyan. The group's film includes scenes from the concert at Yokohama Stadium, rehearsals and backstage.

In partnership with the show Yūyake Nyan Nyan, teen magazine Seventeen ran its annual idol/model audition entitled "1986 Miss Seventeen with Onyanko" in August. The winner of the audition was Noriko Kaise, who was assigned number 41. Makiko Saito, Toshie Moriya and Naoko Takada, who all were runners-up of the audition, also became Onyanko Club members and were assigned numbers 42, 43 and 44, respectively. They made their television debut on the show on 29 September.

Fukunaga's second solo single "Heart no Ignition" was premiered on the weekly show Yūshoku Nyan Nyan on 12 September. The song was used as the ending theme of Fuji TV's live-action TV series Sukeban Deka III: Shōjo Ninpō-chō Denki for the episodes 1 to 8. Fukunaga played a supporting character in the episodes 1 to 20 of the TV series, which had a total of 42 episodes aired from 30 October 1986, to 29 October 1987. Released by Canyon Records on 1 October 1986, the single peaked at number two on the single chart.

On Yūyake Nyan Nyan aired on 26 September, a "graduation ceremony" for Nitta, Nagoya, Fukunaga, Yoshizawa and Yamamoto was held. It was recorded earlier as on the same day the group was having concerts at Nippon Budokan in Tokyo as part of the second nationwide concert tour. On 25 and 26 September, which were the final dates of the tour, Nitta, Nagoya, Fukunaga, Yoshizawa and Yamamoto concluded their activities as Onyanko Club members with the group's concerts at Nippon Budokan. Also, the subgroup Nyangilas disbanded as a result of Nagoya's departure from Onyanko Club. The concert on 26 September was recorded and aired on Fuji TV on 3 November as well as released as a DVD in October 2003 by Pony Canyon.

In September, Onyanko Club B-Gumi, which was a junior version of Onyanko Club and consisted of junior high school girls, was formed. "B-Gumi" means "class B". The members were Mitsuko Yoshimi (B-Gumi number 1), Miyuki Sugiura (B-Gumi number 2), Kumiko Miyano (B-Gumi number 3) and Hiroko Tominaga (B-Gumi number 4), all of whom were runners-up of the audition "1986 Miss Seventeen with Onyanko" held in August, as well as Mayumi Yamazaki (B-Gumi number 5), who won a weekly audition on the TV show Yūyake Nyan Nyan on 25 September. The group made its television debut on the show on 29 September.

Onyanko Club member number 36 Marina Watanabe's first solo single "Shinkokyu-shite" was released by Epic/Sony Records under the name of "Watanabe Marina with Onyanko Club" on 8 October. Two Onyanko Club members Shizuka Kudo (number 38) and Akiko Ikuina (number 40) were selected as backing vocals for the single. It debuted at number one on the Oricon's Japanese single chart. In the chart's history at that time, she became the youngest female singer at her age of 15 years and 11 months who had a debut single that went straight to number one on the single chart in the first week of release. This record was not broken for 14 years and five months.

Onyanko Club's sixth single "Koi wa Kuesuchon" was released by Canyon Records on 1 November. Front vocals for the single were Yukiko Iwai, Ruriko Nagata, Mako Shiraishi and Akiko Ikuina. The single and its B-side were used as the opening theme and ending theme, respectively, of Fuji TV's anime Anmitsu Hime aired from 5 October 1986, to 27 September 1987. The single topped the single chart.

Onyanko Club member number 13 Kazuko Utsumi's first solo single "Aoi Memories" was released by Canyon Records on 7 November. The single and its B-side were used as part of the soundtrack to Fuji TV's anime Touch, which was adaptation from the manga series. The single debuted at number three on the single chart. Prior to joining Onyanko Club, Utsumi used to be a child actress in the 70s and early 1980s and made many one-off appearances on TV drama series and live-action series, such as Kamen Rider Super-1 (episode 3) and Chojin Barom-1 (episode 32) to name few. She also attended a music school established by Masaaki Hirao, who was a critically acclaimed singer-songwriter and music producer in the Japanese pop music industry, and took vocal lessons in the pre-Onyanko Club years. It was one of the reasons why she had many lead vocal parts in the group's earlier recordings.

Compilation album Merry X'mas for You was released by CBS/Sony records on 5 December. It contains six songs and consists of newly released song "Merry X'mas for You" sung together by CBS/Sony Records artists Sonoko Kawai, Sayuri Kokusho, Sanae Jounouchi and Minayo Watanabe as well as Epic/Sony Records artist Marina Watanabe, and five previously released songs, each sung individually by them. The album reached number three on the Oricon's Japanese album chart. In the meantime, television advertisements featuring Onyanko Club member number 40 Akiko Ikuina for Japanese convenience store Lawson's chicken nugget product "Karaage Kun" were premiered on-air on 8 December. In the advertisements, song "Heart ni Bokin wo" was used. At that time, it was generally expected by fans that the song would be released as Ikuina's debut solo single because her name was credited as the singer for the song in the ad and also because the version used in the ad was sung by Ikuina only. However, it later ended up being re-recorded/re-produced as the group's song and released as one of the eleven songs on Onyanko Club's fourth studio album Side Line in early 1987.

As part of her first solo concert tour entitled "E-AREA", Nitta had a concert at Nippon Budokan on 18 December. A concert at Nakano Sun Plaza in Nakao, Tokyo on 3 November for the concert tour was recorded and released as a video by Pony Inc. in January 1987. Kokusho also had a concert at Ryougoku Kokugikan in Sumida, Tokyo on 24 December as the final show of her first solo concert tour entitled "Dash Kokusho!" It was recorded and released as a video by CBS/Sony Home Video in April 1987.

On Yūyake Nyan Nyan aired on 25 December, a "graduation ceremony" for Mami Yumioka (number 34), Takako Okamoto (number 35) and Maki Takabatake (number 39) was held. All the three members decided to retire from the music and entertainment industry. Few months before, they already were set to leave the group as they were not pictured on the cover of the group's single "Koi wa Kuesuchon" released in early November. Okamoto later said in an interview that she initially was interested in the music and entertainment industry but felt she didn't have confidence in pursuing a solo career as an entertainer in the future and wanted to live an ordinary life as a high school student like most people do.

By the end of 1986, singles of the group, its members, "graduated" members and subgroups topped the Oricon's Japanese single chart in 36 weeks out of the 52 weeks in the year. Out of the total 46 singles that topped the chart during 1986, 30 singles were Onyanko Club-related ones. All of their studio albums released in the year were successful on the Oricon's Japanese album chart as well, with the group's second album Yume Catalogue, Nitta's first solo album ERI and Kawai's two albums Siesta and Mode de Sonoko all having reached number one on the album chart.

=== 1987 ===
On Yūyake Nyan Nyan aired on 5 January, it was announced that the group's five members Aki Kihara, Sayuri Kokusho, Kazuko Utsumi, Rika Tatsumi and Mamiko Takai would "graduate" from the group in April. Kokusho, Utsumi and Takai would move on to pursue their solo careers while Kihara and Tatsumi decided to retire from the music and entertainment industry. Onyanko Club's seventh single "No More Ren'ai Gokko" was premiered on Yūyake Nyan Nyan on 9 January. Front vocals for the single were Harumi Tomikawa, Ruriko Nagata, Yukiko Iwai and Mako Shiraishi. Released by Canyon Records on 21 January, the single debuted at number one on the single chart. On the same day as the single's release date, Takai's first solo album Itoguchi, which contains her first three singles released in the previous year, was released by Canyon Records. It debuted at number one on the Oricon's Japanese album chart.

Ushiroyubi Sasaregumi's sixth and last single "Kashiko" was released by Canyon Records on 21 February. It topped the single chart and became the subgroup's fifth consecutive single to reach number one on the chart. The single and its B-side were used as the opening theme and ending theme, respectively, of Fuji TV's anime High School! Kimengumi. On the same day as the release date of the subgroup's last single, Onyanko Club's fourth studio album Side Line was released by Canyon Records. The album features songs in which newer members, such as Shizuka Kudo, Noriko Kaise and Makiko Saito, had solo vocal parts for the first time in the group's recordings, such as "Dare no Seikana" sung by Iwai, Kudo and Ikuina and "One-side Game" sung by Shiraishi, Ikuina, Kaise and Saito as front vocals. Five days after the release of the group's fourth album, Marina Watanabe's first solo album MARINA was released by Epic/Sony Records on 26 February. Both albums topped the album chart. Prior to the release of Watanabe's first solo album, a release event entitled "Sweet Little Sixteen" for the album was held at Nippon Budokan on 15 February with a total of about 10,000 attendees who pre-ordered the album and won tickets to the event.

Ushiroyubi Sasaregumi's compilation album $\infty$ (Unlimited) was released by Canyon Records on 11 March. The album consists of all of its six singles, the sixth single's B-side and four previously unreleased songs. It topped the album chart. With a little less than a month before Ushiroyubi Sasaregumi would disband as a result of Takai's departure from Onyanko Club, Takai's fourth solo single "Kagerou" and another Ushiroyubi Sasaregumi member Yukiko Iwai's first solo single "Tenshi no Bodyguard" were premiered on Yūyake Nyan Nyan on 9 March. On the same day, Onyanko Club member number 15 Rika Tatsumi's first and last solo single "Sonna Tsumorija Nakattanoni" was premiered on the show as well. Takai's fourth single released by Canyon Records and Tatsumi's first single released by Warner-Pioneer both on 18 March reached number one and number 34 on the single chart, respectively. Two days later, a "graduation ceremony" for four Onyanko Club members Toshie Moriya (number 43), Naoko Takada (number 44), Yumiko Yoshida (number 45) and Sanae Nakajima (number 46) as well as two Onyanko Club B-Gumi members Hiroko Tominaga and Mayumi Yamazaki was held on Yūyake Nyan Nyan on 20 March. Their "graduation" was not announced in advance, and also their specific reasons for leaving the groups were not revealed. Although some of the members continued to pursue their careers in the music and entertainment industry, they eventually faded out from the industry or went under the radar except Yamazaki, who had four solo singles released between 1988 and 1992.

The first solo single of Iwai, whose nickname was "Yuuyu", was released by Canyon Records under the name of "Yuuyu with Onyanko Club" on 25 March. Three Onyanko Club members Ruriko Nagata, Mutsumi Yokota and Tomoko Fukawa were selected as backing vocals for the single. It debuted at number two on the single chart. On 28 March, the group's third nationwide concert tour entitled "Onyanko Sailing Yumekoujyou" began at Osaka-jo Hall in Osaka. They subsequently performed at arenas in Fukuoka, Nagoya and Tokyo. The whole tour drew a total of some 200,000 attendees.

On Yūyake Nyan Nyan aired on 30 March, a "graduation ceremony" for Kihara, Kokusho, Utsumi, Tatsumi and Takai was held. On 4 and 5 April, which were the final dates of the tour, Kihara, Kokusho, Utsumi, Tatsumi and Takai concluded their activities as Onyanko Club members with the group's concerts at Yoyogi National Gymnasium in Shibuya, Tokyo. The concerts were recorded and released as a video by Pony Inc. in May. Also on 3 June, live album Onyanko Sailing Yumekoujyou '87 LIVE of the concerts was released in three formats: vinyl, cassette and compact disc, which were released by Canyon Records, Epic/Sony Records and CBS/Sony Records, respectively. The album in each format contains a slightly different set of tracks.

As a new school year started in April, Onyanko Club B-Gumi members Mitsuko Yoshimi, Miyuki Sugiura and Kumiko Miyano, who all became high school students, were advanced to Onyanko Club on 6 April. Yoshimi, Sugiura and Miyano were assigned numbers 49, 50 and 51, respectively. Prior to the advancement, they participated in Onyanko Club's third nationwide concert tour in March and April and made their concert debut.

Onyanko Club's third subgroup Ushirogami Hikaretai started performing its first single "Toki no Kawa wo Koete" on Yūyake Nyan Nyan on 13 April. Its members were Shizuka Kudo, Akiko Ikuina and Makiko Saito. It was formed as a successor to Ushiroyubi Sasaregumi, which disbanded on the final date of Onyanko Club's concert tour earlier in the same month. Like Ushiroyubi Sasaregumi's singles, the first single of Ushirogami Hikaretai and its B-side, with music composed by Tsugutoshi Goto and lyrics written by Yasushi Akimoto, were used as the opening theme and ending theme, respectively, of Fuji TV's anime High School! Kimengumi. In the meantime, Wakako Suzuki won a weekly audition on Yūyake Nyan Nyan on 17 April and became the 52nd Onyanko Club member. Within the following two months it turned out that she was the last member to join the group. Onyanko Club's eighth single "Katatsumuri Samba" was premiered on Yūyake Nyan Nyan on 28 April. Front vocals for the single were Harumi Tomikawa, Shizuka Kudo, Mitsuko Yoshimi and Miyuki Sugiura. Ushirogami Hikaretai's first single released on 7 May and Onyanko Club's eighth single released on 21 May both by Canyon Records debuted at number one on the single chart. On 7 May, Yūyake Nyan Nyan's 500th episode was aired.

On Yūyake Nyan Nyan aired on 15 June, it was announced that Onyanko Club would disband after its final concert in September and that Yūyake Nyan Nyan's final episode would be aired on 31 August. In the following month, Marina Watanabe's fourth single "Natsuyasumi Dakeno Side Seat" was released by Epic/Sony Records on 15 July. Two weeks later, Minayo Watanabe's fifth single "Amaryllis" was released by CBS/Sony Records on 29 July. Both singles topped the chart. "Amaryllis" became Minayo Watanabe's fifth consecutive single that debuted at number one on the chart. In the chart's history as of 2023, she is the only female singer who has the five consecutive number-one singles since her solo debut.

Released by Canyon Records on 29 July, Yukiko Iwai's first solo album Yuuyu Kousen debuted at number one on the Oricon's LP chart. A week later, Onyanko Club's fifth and final studio album Circle was released as a double album on 5 August by Kirigirisu Records, a label established for the group and owned jointly by Canyon Records, For Life Records, CBS/Sony Records and EPIC/Sony Records. The first disc consists of 14 newly released songs: four songs sung individually by the group's four members who made their solo debut earlier, seven songs sung individually by seven "graduated" members, one song sung by the subgroup Ushirogami Hikaretai and two instrumentals. The second disc contains 12 newly released songs sung by various combinations of the group's members. The double album reached number two on the Oricon's album chart.

The group's fourth and final nationwide concert tour entitled "Onyanko Club Kaisan Kinen Zenkoku Jyudan Final Concert" began at Hokkaido Kosei Nenkin Kaikan in Sapporo, Hokkaido on 1 August. Subsequently, they performed in Hiroshima, Fukuoka, Nagoya, Fukui, Nagoya (the second visit), Kooriyama, Niigata, Nagano and Osaka in August and in Tokyo in September. At concerts in each of the cities except Tokyo, one to four "graduated" members made guest appearances and performed a few of their own songs.

On 12 August, Ushirogami Hikaretai's second single "Anata wo Shiritai" was released by Canyon Records. The single and its B-side were used as the opening theme and ending theme, respectively, of Fuji TV's anime High School! Kimengumi. It debuted at number two on the single chart. Two days before the release of Ushirogami Hikaretai's second single, Onyanko Club's ninth single "Wedding Dress" was premiered on Yūyake Nyan Nyan on 10 August. Front vocals for the single were Harumi Tomikawa, Ruriko Nagata, Mako Shiraishi, Mutsumi Yokota and Tomoko Fukawa. Released by Kirigirisu Records on 21 August, the single debuted at number two on the single chart.

After two years and five months of its run, the show Yūyake Nyan Nyan was ended with an extended two-hour live broadcast on 31 August. Most of past Onyanko Club members except dismissed members made their appearance on the final episode. Also, a "graduation ceremony" for the 19 remaining members was held. On the same day as the show's finale, Shizuka Kudo's first solo single "Kindan no Telepathy" was released by Canyon Records. It debuted at number one on the single chart. The group concluded its activities with its final concerts at Yoyogi National Gymnasium in Shibuya, Tokyo on 19 and 20 September. They had two shows a day on the 19th and three shows a day on the 20th. At the final concerts, 11 "graduated" members reunited with the remaining members on stage and performed a few of the group's songs together toward the end of each show as well as "graduated" members' songs. Part of the afternoon show on the 20th was broadcast live on Fuji TV. The whole evening show on the 20th was recorded and released as a video by Pony Canyon on 31 October. By the time of the disbandment, 43 of 71 singles of the group, its members, "graduated" members and subgroups topped the Oricon's Japanese single chart.

== Post-disbandment ==
Members who had their solo singles and/or albums earlier and the subgroup Ushirogami Hikaretai continued to expand their activities with more music releases and media appearances. Several members had their first solo singles after the disbandment. On 21 November 1987, Onyanko Club member number 48 Kayo Agatsuma's first solo single, "Private wa Dangerous", was released by CBS/Sony Records. It reached number nine on the single chart. Onyanko Club B-Gumi member number 5 Mayumi Yamazaki's first solo single "Hitomi wo Mitsumete" was released by Polydor Records (Japan) on 1 April 1988. Ushirogami Hikaretai member Akiko Ikuina's first solo single "Mugiwara de Dance" was released by Pony Canyon on 21 May 1988. The single and its B-side were used as the opening theme and ending theme, respectively, of Fuji TV's anime Tsuide ni Tonchinkan, which was adaptation from the manga series. It reached number eight on the single chart. Another Ushirogami Hikaretai member Makiko Saito's first solo single "Yaritai Houdai" was released by Pony Canyon on 21 July 1988. It reached number 28 on the single chart.

Sayuri Kokusho, Minayo Watanabe, Marina Watanabe and Akiko Ikuina went on to have successful careers as actresses, singers, and/or TV personalities throughout the remainder of the decade and 1990s, appearing on variety TV shows and films. Sanae Jounouchi continued having music releases constantly and a successful career as an enka singer. All of them are active in the entertainment industry as of 2023. Ikuina later became a member of the House of Councillors, having been elected from the Tokyo at-large district on 10 July 2022.

Shizuka Kudo went on to have chart-topping hits in the 1980s and 1990s. Rika Tatsumi graduated from Tokai University and launched a career as a sales representative at Pony Canyon promoting artists' releases including Kudo's in the Tokyo and Nagoya areas.

Eri Nitta found a career as a writer and columnist after retiring into private life in 1990. She later re-entered the show business as a TV personality in 1993. Miharu Nakajima continued working as a dental hygienist before getting married in 1997. Aki Kihara and Mika Nagoya moved to the Netherlands and Hong Kong, respectively, to study, work, and they eventually each got married and settled in those locations. Harumi Tomikawa became a water sports instructor at JAL Private Resort Okuma in Okinawa after having worked as a commercial model and TV personality for several years. Kumiko Susan Yamamoto graduated from Bunkyo Gakuin College and has worked for group companies of the Central Japan Railway Company thereafter. Makiko Saito married the chief executive officer of the Sujahta Meiraku Group in 1998.

The group's 10th single "Shoumi Kigen", its first one in 15 years, was released by Pony Canyon on 20 November 2002. 14 members who participated in recording of the single were Nitta, Kihara, Kokusho, Nagoya, Utsumi, Tomikawa, Tatsumi, Jounouchi, Iwai, Shiraishi, Yokota, Minayo Watanabe, Yamamoto and Fukawa. The new release project came along in response to good sales of five-disc DVD box set Onyanko Club Saishuu-ban: The Final Episode released by Pony Canyon on 17 April 2002. More members, namely Yumioka, Okamoto, Kaise, Yuriko Yamamori (number 47), Agatsuma, Sugiura and Miyano, joined the reunion for performances of the single on TV shows around the time of the single's release. Subsequently, there have been several brief reunions, including one on an episode of Hey! Hey! Hey! Music Champ in 2012.

Onyanko Club's 126-CD box set Kessei Sanjyusshuunen Kinen CD-BOX Single Record Fukkoku Nyan Nyan (結成30周年記念CD-BOX シングルレコード復刻ニャンニャン) was released by Pony Canyon on 18 March 2015 to commemorate the 30th anniversary of the group's formation. It includes all of the group's, three subgroups' and 16 members' singles released by Canyon Records, CBS/Sony Records, Epic/Sony Records, For Life Records and Warner-Pioneer between 5 July 1985 and 6 September 1989. Each of the 7-inch singles was replicated as a 12-cm compact disc with a scaled-down original front cover insert or sleeve, inner paper sleeve and inner plastic sleeve. Each CD contains an A-side and B-side of a single as well as their instrumental (karaoke) tracks, except for the "Merry X'mas for You" bonus CD, which contains only the song and its instrumental track. There are 251 songs and their 251 instrumental versions on 126 CDs. Additionally some CDs include extra audio tracks spoken by members. The box set was limited to pre-order by 16 January 2015 although a small number of copies went on general sale after the release date.

=== Members ===
Listed in order of joining Onyanko Club. Members 1 to 11 were the original members of the group when it started on 1 April 1985, and were assigned member numbers randomly. Subsequent members of the group were assigned numbers based on the order of their joining. Members 12 to 16 joined during April 1985.

Membership number	Name	Native	Birth date (age)	Joining date	Leaving date	Notes
1	Mika Okuda (奥田美香)	Tokyo	28 February 1968 (age 58)	1 April 1985	25 April 1985	The original member, dismissed from the group on 25 April 1985, through underage smoking referred to as the Shūkan bunshun smoking scandal. Still, she continued her own show business activities and she was approached to make her record debut on Polydor Japan, but it never materialized. In 1988, she appeared nude in Playboy magazine. In 1991, she started the entertainment agency Yunnu Project featuring Dial Q2, along with Chīko, a former member of the idol group Shōjo-tai (少女隊).
2	Michiko Enokida (榎田道子)	Tokyo	4 May 1967 (age 59)	1 April 1985	25 April 1985	The original member, dismissed from the group on 25 April 1985, through the Shūkan Bunshun Smoking Scandal. In 1997, she auditioned for the TV variety show Asayan, but was not selected. In 2017, she appeared on the TV program Explosive Reports! The Friday (爆報！THEフライデー) to give more details regarding the scandal. In 2023, she ran for the city council election in Wakō, the location of her beauty salon, but was not elected.
3	Kayoko Yoshino (吉野佳代子)	Saitama	3 April 1967 (age 59)	1 April 1985	25 April 1985	The original member, dismissed from the group on 25 April 1985, through the Shūkan Bunshun Smoking Scandal. It is said that had she remained, her beauty and cheerfulness likely would have made her a popular member. In 1986, she appeared as a model in a magazine. She was the only dismissed member whose conversations and close-ups were not included in the official DVDs featuring early footage of Yūyake Nyan Nyan.
4	Eri Nitta (新田恵利)	Saitama	17 March 1968 (age 58)	1 April 1985	26 September 1986	The original member, in the second "graduating group" of Onyanko Club, married an employee of Fuji TV, took a break from entertainment but is now working in the field again. She is regarded as the face of Onyanko Club.
5	Miharu Nakajima (中島美春)	Tokyo	1 October 1967 (age 59)	1 April 1985	31 March 1986	The original member, in the first "graduating group" of Onyanko Club. She became a dental hygienist after graduating from the group. She then married the manager of Japanese owarai group Tunnels.
6	Aki Kihara (樹原亜紀)	Kanagawa	30 March 1969 (age 57)	1 April 1985	30 March 1987	The original member, in the fifth "graduating group" of Onyanko Club, member of Nyangilas. She was the only one of the six members involved in the Shūkan Bunshun Smoking Scandal not to be fired. She subsequently moved to the Netherlands and became a cook at a Japanese restaurant. She had two children after her marriage with a Dutch artist.
7	Mamiko Tomoda (友田麻美子)	Tokyo	8 January 1968 (age 58)	1 April 1985	25 April 1985	The original member, dismissed from the group on 25 April 1985, through the Shūkan Bunshun Smoking Scandal. She is said to have been positioned as the ace of Onyanko Club. When she was about 30 years old, she started working on handmade bags. Eventually, she became a popular designer with Chieko Kuroda (黒田知永子), a popular fashion model, as a client. In 2016, she appeared on the TV program "Explosive Reports! The Friday" to give more details regarding the scandal. It is said that she has smoked cigarettes without repentance since her dismissal.
8	Sayuri Kokushō (国生さゆり)	Kagoshima	22 December 1966 (age 59)	1 April 1985	30 March 1987	The original member, in the fifth "graduating group" of Onyanko Club, still working in entertainment. In 1995, she admitted at a press conference that she had intimated with singer and actor Tsuyoshi Nagabuchi. She subsequently married twice, first a former junior high school classmate and then a businessman, but both resulted in divorces. She is said to have shown leadership as a former athlete who was strict on hierarchy during her Onyanko Club days.
9	Mika Nagoya (名越美香)	Saitama	13 April 1966 (age 60)	1 April 1985	26 September 1986	The original member, in the second "graduating group" of Onyanko Club, member of Nyangilas. After graduation, she played the role of a geisha girl on the popular show Takeshi's Castle. She then moved to Hong Kong, and had a daughter after her marriage with a local pilot.
10	Mayumi Satō (佐藤真由美)	Saitama	25 September 1967 (age 59)	1 April 1985	25 April 1985	The original member, dismissed from the group on 25 April 1985, through the Shūkan Bunshun Smoking Scandal. In 1986, she reportedly was runner-up at the Miss Ice Cream Contest. She is also said to have been a model.
11	Satomi Fukunaga (福永恵規)	Tokyo	26 January 1967 (age 59)	1 April 1985	26 September 1986	The original member, in the second "graduating group" of Onyanko Club, had four solo singles and two solo albums, married after retiring from entertainment. She then went on to become a director of the entertainment agency Office Nisshin (オフィス日新).
12	Sonoko Kawai (河合その子)	Aichi	20 June 1965 (age 61)	5 April 1985	31 March 1986	One of the first three members who joined the group by the audition, the first member to went solo, in the first "graduating group" of Onyanko Club, married bassist, songwriter Tsugutoshi Gotō after retiring from entertainment. She subsequently had a son. She is described as having been a beautiful honor student or a singing Licca-chan during her Onyanko Club days.
13	Kazuko Utsumi (内海和子)	Tokyo	16 February 1967 (age 59)	5 April 1985	30 March 1987	One of the first three members who joined the group by the audition, was a child actress in the 70s, in the fifth "graduating group" of Onyanko Club, had four solo singles, a solo album and a nude photobook after Onyanko Club broke up. Her only daughter, Yulianne (ゆりあんぬ), also became an idol.
14	Harumi Tomikawa (富川春美)	Chiba	2 September 1968 (age 58)	5 April 1985	20 September 1987	One of the first three members who joined the group by the audition, the longest member of Onyanko Club when the group broke up, was supposed to have a solo single while being in Onyanko Club, which was aborted as a result of her high school's restrictions on her Onyanko Club activities. After graduation, she continued her own show business activities including Takeshi's Castle. She then moved to Okinawa to work at the JAL Private Resort Okuma (JALプライベートリゾートオクマ). She had two children after her marriage.
15	Rika Tatsumi (立見里歌)	Tokyo	14 November 1965 (age 60)	19 April 1985	30 March 1987	Member of Nyangilas, had a solo single, married in 1991, has a son, once worked for Pony Canyon after graduated from Tōkai University, was an editor of a magazine, worked for an advertising agency.
16	Mamiko Takai (高井麻巳子)	Fukui	28 December 1966 (age 59)	26 April 1985	30 March 1987	Member of Ushiroyubi Sasaregumi, retired from the entertainment business after her marriage with lyric writer Yasushi Akimoto in 1988 and finally had a daughter in 2001. Akimoto later became the producer of AKB48 Group.
17	Sanae Jōnouchi (城之内早苗)	Ibaraki	17 May 1968 (age 58)	10 May 1985	20 September 1987	Member when the group broke up, currently an enka singer, married a television producer in 2004. She is regarded as the best singer among the members of Onyanko Club.
18	Ruriko Nagata (永田ルリ子)	Gifu	23 June 1967 (age 59)	17 May 1985	20 September 1987	Member when the group broke up, had nickname Ruri-ruri. She was eager to make her solo debut, but was rejected by chief director Kazuji Kasai. In 1988, she married an employee of a television production company. In the 21st century, she started refusing to give video permissions. As a result, whenever Onyanko Club footage is shown on TV, her face is always covered with a mosaic.
19	Yukiko Iwai (岩井由紀子)	Kanagawa	26 May 1968 (age 58)	21 June 1985	20 September 1987	Member when the group broke up, member of Ushiroyubi Sasaregumi, had stage name "Yuuyu" for a while after Onyanko Club broke up, married in 1997 and retired from the entertainment business. She subsequently had two children.
20	Yōko Teramoto (寺本容子)	Tokyo	21 December 1969 (age 56)	19 July 1985	10 September 1985	Her high school did not allow entertainment activities, so she had no choice but to drop out. However, the act of having dropped out of high school was itself considered a violation of the group's rules, and she was forced to leave the group in September 1985. Still, she continued her own show business activities, but retired after her marriage in 1996.
21	Tamaki Gomioka (五味岡たまき)	Kōchi	19 January 1970 (age 56)	26 July 1985	20 September 1985	She told Kasai that she did not enjoy the Onyanko Club activities at all, that she was simply sleepy. Therefore, she left the group in September 1985. She then resumed her own show business activities in 1987. She was supposed to have a solo single entitled Don't Become Cheap (チープにならないで, Chīpu ni Naranai de) in 1988, which was aborted, suddenly retired from entertainment shortly afterward.
22	Mako Shiraishi (白石麻子)	Tokyo	12 June 1969 (age 57)	26 July 1985	20 September 1987	Member when the group broke up, member of Nyangilas, worked for Jaguar Japan after graduation, mother of four children, currently a yoga instructor as well as a child therapist.
23	Kaori Hayashi (林香織)	Hyōgo	8 February 1969 (age 57)	2 August 1985	27 March 1986	Osaka regional member, graduated during the same tour as 5 and 12. She then went on to work at a cosmetics company.
24	Fumiyo Mita (三田文代)	Hiroshima	6 January 1967 (age 59)	16 August 1985	27 March 1986	Hiroshima regional member, graduated with Kaori (24), was member 611 of the Momoko Club (a 1980s variety show on TBS), was once studying theatre in New York City.
25	Akie Yoshizawa (吉沢秋絵)	Tokyo	20 October 1968 (age 58)	30 August 1985	20 September 1986	Made her acting debut as Yukino Yajima in Sukeban Deka II: Shōjo Tekkamen Densetsu, released several solo singles and albums, retired from entertainment in 1992.
26	Yoshie Akasaka (赤坂芳恵)	Tokyo	20 July 1968 (age 58)	27 September 1985	4 October 1985	She auditioned without permission from her high school. Due to complaints from the school, she was forced to leave the group after only one week on the program. She then became a model and retired after her marriage in 1994. She was member 2142 of the Momoko Club.
27	Aki Matsumoto (松本亜紀)	Tokyo	23 November 1969 (age 56)	25 October 1985	25 October 1985	Due to complaints from her high school, she, like Akasaka, left the group. In her case, she never appeared on the program even for just one day. She then became a tarento and even a nightclub singer. She subsequently had a daughter, but did not marry. She was member 1861 of the Momoko Club.
28	Mutsumi Yokota (横田睦美)	Chiba	26 September 1967 (age 59)	29 November 1985	20 September 1987	Member when the group broke up, the winner of the Young Paradise (ヤングパラダイス) campaign girl contest. After graduation, she continued her own show business activities including Takeshi's Castle. Currently a yoga instructor.
29	Minayo Watanabe (渡辺美奈代)	Aichi	28 September 1969 (age 57)	29 November 1985	20 September 1987	Member when the group broke up, runner-up of the Young Paradise campaign girl contest, still working in entertainment, mother of two sons.
30	Chiaki Mikami (三上千晶)	Tokyo	28 June 1969 (age 57)	29 November 1985	March 1986	Joined after becoming runner-up of the Young Paradise campaign girl contest. Kasai explained only that one of the reasons she left the group in the spring of 1986 was because of school club activities. She graduated from junior college and then became a flight attendant for JAL.
31	Yūko Yajima (矢島裕子)	Kanagawa	15 December 1968 (age 57)	29 November 1985	February 1986	Joined after becoming runner-up of the Young Paradise campaign girl contest. Kasai explained only that she left the group for the same reason as Mikami. She then reportedly became a medical worker.
32	Susan Kumiko Yamamoto (山本スーザン久美子)	Tokyo	26 June 1966 (age 60)	13 December 1985	26 September 1986	The only mixed-race member, in the second "graduating group" of Onyanko Club. She then went on to work at JR Tōkai and then at its affiliated publishing company. She is known to be an avid fan of Takarazuka Revue.
33	Tomoko Fukawa (布川智子)	Kanagawa	30 August 1968 (age 58)	17 January 1986	20 September 1987	Member when the group broke up, sister of Toshikazu Fukawa (布川敏和) from Japanese boy band Shibugakitai. She had three children after her marriage. In 2011, she resumed her own show business activities under the name Tomoko Ogino (荻野智子, Ogino Tomoko). In addition, her daughter Kokoro Ogino (荻野心) also became an idol.
34	Mami Yumioka (弓岡真美)	Tokyo	15 September 1970 (age 56)	10 January 1986	25 December 1986	In the third "graduating group" of Onyanko Club, joined after graduating from junior high school on 14 March 1986. She left show business after graduating from the group because Kasai judged that she was unsuitable for entertainment activities outside of Onyanko Club. She subsequently got a job in the medical field. She had two children after her marriage.
35	Takako Okamoto (岡本貴子)	Tokyo	1 March 1971 (age 55)	10 January 1986	25 December 1986	In the third "graduating group" of Onyanko Club, joined at the same time as Mami Yumioka. She left show business after graduating from the group for the same reason as Yumioka. She then went on to work at a confectionery company. She had two children after her marriage.
36	Marina Watanabe (渡辺満里奈)	Tokyo	18 November 1970 (age 55)	27 March 1986	20 September 1987	Member when the group broke up, still works in entertainment, married Jun Nagura from owarai conte group Neptune in 2005, and subsequently had two children.
37	Kaori Ōnuki (大貫かおり)	Kanagawa	17 May 1970 (age 56)	9 May 1986	12 May 1986	She appeared on stage one day only after joining Onyanko Club and soon left the group. She subsequently claimed that the main reason for this was that she decided she was unlikely to be able to cope any longer with the stalking behavior of her enthusiastic fans. She was member 1809 of the Momoko Club, currently a tarento and model. She published a book of nude photographs. In addition, she became famous for her role as a dominatrix in V-Cinema. She then opened a members-only pub.
38	Shizuka Kudō (工藤静香)	Tokyo	14 April 1970 (age 56)	23 May 1986	20 September 1987	Member when the group broke up, member of Ushirogami Hikaretai, was member 480 of the Momoko Club, currently a singer, had two children after her marriage with Takuya Kimura from Japanese boy band SMAP.
39	Maki Takabatake (高畠真紀)	Tokushima	21 April 1968 (age 58)	30 May 1986	25 December 1986	In the third "graduating group" of Onyanko Club. She graduated from Tōkai University and then became a flight attendant for ANA.
40	Akiko Ikuina (生稲晃子)	Tokyo	28 April 1968 (age 58)	13 June 1986	20 September 1987	Member when the group broke up, member of Ushirogami Hikaretai, made her solo debut after Onyanko Club broke up, became a regular member of the cast of Abarenbō Shōgun for several seasons, still works in entertainment and became a politician. She had a daughter after her marriage.
41	Noriko Kaise (貝瀬典子)	Gunma	5 March 1970 (age 56)	10 August 1986	20 September 1987	Member when the group broke up, the winner of the 1986 Miss Seventeen Contest. She continued her own show business activities after graduation. In 1994, she served as a promotional model for NEC.
42	Makiko Saitō (斉藤満喜子)	Hiroshima	19 September 1970 (age 56)	10 August 1986	20 September 1987	Member when the group broke up, member of Ushirogami Hikaretai, runner-up of the 1986 Miss Seventeen Contest, made her solo debut after Onyanko Club broke up, married in 1998 and retired from entertainment. She subsequently had two children.
43	Toshie Moriya (守屋寿恵)	Kanagawa	11 June 1970 (age 56)	10 August 1986	20 March 1987	In the fourth "graduating group" of Onyanko Club, runner-up of the 1986 Miss Seventeen Contest. She continued her own show business activities after graduation and was supposed to release a solo single, but as a result did not materialize. She had two children after her marriage.
44	Naoko Takada (高田尚子)	Chiba	29 August 1970 (age 56)	10 August 1986	20 March 1987	In the fourth "graduating group" of Onyanko Club, received a special award in the 1986 Miss Seventeen Contest. She had three children after her marriage.
45	Yumiko Yoshida (吉田裕美子)	Saitama	3 January 1971 (age 55)	19 September 1986	20 March 1987	In the fourth "graduating group" of Onyanko Club. She was recognized for her superb Limbo. After graduation, she continued her own show business activities including an appearance in a FamilyMart commercial.
46	Sanae Nakajima (中島早苗)	Tokyo	27 October 1970 (age 56)	25 September 1986	20 March 1987	In the fourth "graduating group" of Onyanko Club, was member 1319 of the Momoko Club, had a role in Uchū Keiji Gavan as a child. After graduation, she continued her own show business activities including an appearance in a Clearasil Japan commercial.
47	Yuriko Yamamori (山森由里子)	Kanagawa	30 November 1970 (age 55)	24 October 1986	20 September 1987	Member when the group broke up, was accepted into the group on her second try. After graduation, she worked at a department store and then at a budget hotel. She had two children after her marriage.
48	Kayo Agatsuma (我妻佳代)	Miyagi	25 July 1968 (age 58)	23 January 1987	20 September 1987	Made her solo debut after the group broke up, sister of idol Naomi Serizawa (芹沢直美). She had two children after her marriage, but divorced. In 2003, she opened a members-only bar in Roppongi.
49	Mitsuko Yoshimi (吉見美津子)	Chiba	25 December 1971 (age 54)	10 August 1986	20 September 1987	Member No. 1 of Onyanko Club B-Gumi, recipient of a special award in the 1986 Miss Seventeen Contest, was member 1956 of the Momoko Club. In 1993, she published a book of nude photographs. She then changed her name to Mitsuko Imai (今井美津子, Imai Mitsuko) and continued her own show business activities, mainly as an actress, until she retired.
50	Miyuki Sugiura (杉浦美雪)	Aichi	14 October 1971 (age 55)	10 August 1986	20 September 1987	Member No. 2 of Onyanko Club B-Gumi, recipient of a special award in the 1986 Miss Seventeen Contest, became a race queen after Onyanko Club broke up, currently a model and actress.
51	Kumiko Miyano (宮野久美子)	Aichi	13 December 1971 (age 54)	10 August 1986	20 September 1987	Member No. 3 of Onyanko Club B-Gumi, recipient of a special award in the 1986 Miss Seventeen Contest, formed idol group "Kiss" after Onyanko Club broke up, currently working as a wedding moderator.
52	Wakako Suzuki (鈴木和佳子)	Miyazaki	26 January 1969 (age 57)	17 April 1987	20 September 1987	The last member of Onyanko Club. She subsequently became a model.
B-Gumi 4	Hiroko Tominaga (冨永浩子)	Saitama	1 May 1971 (age 55)	10 August 1986	20 March 1987	Member No. 4 of Onyanko Club B-Gumi, recipient of a special award in the 1986 Miss Seventeen Contest, in the fourth "graduating group" of Onyanko Club. She was not promoted to an official member of Onyanko Club after graduating from junior high school in March 1987 and retired from show business.
B-Gumi 5	Mayumi Yamazaki (山崎真由美)	Kanagawa	1 December 1971 (age 54)	25 September 1986	20 March 1987	Member No. 5 of Onyanko Club B-Gumi, in the fourth "graduating group" of Onyanko Club. She, like Tominaga, was not promoted to an official member of Onyanko Club after graduating from junior high school in March 1987. She then made her solo debut, became a gravure model, worked with Yellowcab (イエローキャブ) for a short time, now a housewife and a lecturer on Hawaiian quilts
Trainee	Yolinda Yan (ヨリンダ・ヤン)	Hong Kong	14 July 1969 (age 57)	13 July 1987	31 July 1987	Trainee member of Onyanko Club, only non-Japanese member, later became a popular cantopop singer in her native Hong Kong, active from late 1980s to mid 1990s

== Discography ==
=== Singles ===
1. "Sailor Fuku wo Nugasanai de" ("Don't Make Me Take Off My Sailor Suit") (セーラー服を脱がさないで, Sērāfuku o Nugasanai de) / Premature Generation (早すぎる世代, Haya Sugiru Sedai) (1985-07-05, 7A0502 (EP))
  - Lead vocalists (hereinafter referred to as "front vocals") are Nitta (#4), Nakajima (#5), Fukunaga (#11) and Utsumi (#13). It debuted at number 34 on the Oricon's Japanese single chart, peaked at number five and remained charted for 17 weeks.
2. "Oyoshi ni Natte ne Teacher" ("Better Be Good, Teacher") (およしになってねTEACHER, Oyoshi ni Natte Tīchā) / Teddy Bear Time: The Sweet Scent of a Young Girl (テディベアの頃-少女の香り-, Tedi Bea no Goro: Shōjo no Kaori) (1985-10-21, 7A0530 (EP))
  - Front vocals are Nitta, Nakajima, Fukunaga and Utsumi. The B-side was sung by Nitta as a lead vocal, Nakajima, Fukunaga and Utsumi as backing vocals. It debuted at number two on the Oricon's Japanese single chart and remained charted for 15 weeks.
3. "Jā ne" ("See Ya") (じゃあね, Jā ne) / Uh-oh-oh-oh (アレレレ) (1986-02-21, 7A0555 (EP))
  - Front vocals are Nakajima for the A-side, Nitta, Nakajima, Fukunaga and Utsumi for the B-side. It debuted at number one on the Oricon's Japanese single chart and remained charted for nine weeks.
4. "Otto Chikan!" ("Uh-oh Pervert!") (おっとCHIKAN!, Otto Chikan!) / Memory of a Beautiful Woman (思い出美人, Omoide Bijin) (1986-04-21, 7A0575 (EP))
  - Front vocals are Fukunaga, Utsumi, Jōnouchi (#17), Nagata (#18), Yokota (#28) for the A-side and Utsumi for the B-side. It debuted at number one on the Oricon's Japanese single chart and remained charted for eight weeks.
5. "Osaki ni Shitsurei" ("Excuse Me Until Next Time") (お先に失礼, Osaki ni Shitsurei) / Summer Print (プリントの夏, Purinto no Natsu) (1986-07-21, 7A0607 (EP))
  - The theme song of film Onyanko the Movie: One Shot Danger! (おニャン子 ザ・ムービー 危機イッパツ!, Onyanko za Mūbī: Kiki Ippatsu!) released by Toho Pictures.
  - Front vocals are Tomikawa (#14), Iwai (#19), Fukawa (#33), Watanabe (#36) for the A-side and Utsumi for the B-side. It debuted at number one on the Oricon's Japanese single chart and remained charted for nine weeks.
6. "Koi wa Question" ("Love is a Question") (恋はくえすちょん, Koi wa Kuesuchon) / Anmitsu Great Strategy (あんみつ大作戦, Anmitsu Dai Sakusen) (1986-11-01, 7A0646 (EP))
  - Opening and ending themes for Anmitsu Hime anime series.
  - Front vocals are Nagata, Iwai, Shiraishi (#22) and Ikuina (#40). It debuted at number one on the Oricon's Japanese single chart and remained charted for seven weeks.
7. "No More Ren'ai Gokko" ("No More Make-Believe Love") (NO MORE 恋愛ごっこ, No Moa Ren'ai Gokko) / Good Night to Only You (あなただけおやすみなさい, Anata Dake Oyasumi Nasai) / Onyanko Message (おニャン子メッセージ, Onyanko Messēji) (1987-01-21, 7A0676 (EP), 10P3042 (cassette)
  - Front vocals are Tomikawa, Nagata, Iwai and Shiraishi for the A-side. The B-side was sung by all members at the time of the release. The "Onyanko Message" is found only on the cassette. It debuted at number one on the Oricon's Japanese single chart and remained charted for six weeks.
8. "Katatsumuri Samba" ("Snail Samba") (かたつむりサンバ], Katatsumuri Sanba) / Pistils and Stamens (めしべとおしべ, Meshibe to Oshibe) (1987-05-21, 7A0718 (EP))
  - Front vocals are Tomikawa, Kudō (#38), Yoshimi (#49), Sugiura (#50) for the A-side, Nagata, Shiraishi, Kaise (#41) and Agatsuma (#48) for the B-side. It debuted at number one on the Oricon's Japanese single chart and remained charted for five weeks.
9. "Wedding Dress" ("Wedding Dress") (ウェディングドレス, Uedingu Doresu) / Please Treat Me Well (私をよろしく, Watashi o Yososhiku) (1987-08-21, 7A0758 (EP))
  - Front vocals are Tomikawa, Nagata, Shiraishi, Yokota and Fukawa. It debuted at number two on the Oricon's Japanese single chart and remained charted for seven weeks.
10. "Shōmikigen" ("Best-before Date") (ショーミキゲン) / Classmates (同級生, Dōkyūsei) (2002-11-20, OCCA-70026 (CD))
  - Front vocals are Nitta, Kokushō (#8), Utsumi, Jōnouchi, Iwai and Watanabe (#29). It debuted at number 48 on the Oricon's Japanese single chart and remained charted for five weeks.

=== Albums ===
==== Studio albums ====
- KICK OFF (1985)
- Yume Catalogue (夢カタログ) (1986)
- Panic the World (1986)
- Side Line (1987)
- Circle (1987)

==== Live albums ====
- Onyanko Sailing Yume Koujou '87 LIVE (おニャン子Sailing夢工場'87 LIVE) (1987)

==== Compilations ====
- Super Best (1986)
- NON-STOP Onyanko (1986) (1993; CD re-release)
- Kahou (家宝) (1987)
- Onyanko Club Best (1987)
- Forever Idol Best Series: Onyanko Club (1989)
- Best Selection (1989)
- ULTRA NYANKO OMOTE SPECIAL (1997)
- ULTRA NYANKO URA SPECIAL (1997)
- Onyanko Club A-sides Collection volumes 1, 2, 3, 4 & 5 (1999)
- Onyanko Club B-sides Collection volumes 1, 2, 3, 4 & 5 (1999)
- EURO Onyanko (2000)
- My Kore! (Myこれ!) series
  - My Kore! Ction: Onyanko Club BEST (2001; digitally remastered)
  - My Kore! Choice 14: Yume Catalog + Single Collection (2008)
  - My Kore! Lite: Onyanko Club (2010)
- Onyanko Club Mini Best (2002)
- Onyanko Club Solo & Units Mini Best (2002)
- 30–35 VOL. 3 "Onyanko Club" Tokushū (30–35 VOL.3 「おニャン子クラブ」特集) (2005)
- Debut Album ni Hari wo Otoshite... Onyanko Club-hen (デビューアルバムに針を落として... おニャン子クラブ編) (2006)
- Onyanko Club SINGLES Complete (2007)
- The Premium Best Onyanko Club (2012)

==== Box sets ====
- Onyanko Club Daizenshū (おニャン子クラブ大全集) (2005) (2008; re-release)
- Kessei Sanjū Shūnen Kinen CD-BOX Single Record Fukkoku Nyan Nyan (結成30周年記念CD-BOX シングルレコード復刻ニャンニャン) (2015)

== Concerts ==
Throughout the span of Onyanko, it had 1 solo concert and 4 nationwide tours.

Year	Name	Details
1985	First Concert KICK OFF	1 Performance October 5 - Hibiya Open-Air Concert Hall Setlist: 1. Sailor Fuku wo Nugasanaide / Onyanko Club; 2. Hayasugiru Sedai / Onyanko Club; 3. Natsu no Christmas / Eri Nitta・Miharu Nakajima・Satomi Fukunaga・Kazuko Utsumi・Mika Nagoya・Mamiko Takai; 4. Houkago ni Ochikonda Shoujo / Onyanko Club; 5. Ai no Rinri Shakai / Onyanko Club; 6. FEN wo Kikasete/ Eri Nitta・Miharu Nakajima; 7. Shh! Ai wa Oshizuka ni… / Kazuko Utsumi・Mamiko Takai・Sonoko Kawai・Yukiko Iwai; 8. Teddy Bear no Koro -Shoujo no Kaori- / Eri Nitta＋Onyanko Club; 9. Ijiwaru ne Darlin' / Miharu Nakajima・Mika Nagoya・Ruriko Nagata・Aki Kihara・Harumi Tomikawa・Sanae Jonouchi・Mamiko Takai・Rika Tatsumi; 10. LIKE A CHERRY BOY / Onyanko Club; 11. Ushiroyubi Sasaregumi / Ushiroyubi Sasaregumi; 12. Jogakusei no Ketsui / Ushiroyubi Sasaregumi; 13. Naze？no Arashi / Akie Yoshizawa with Onyanko Club; 14. Namida no Jasmine LOVE / Sonoko Kawai; 15. Sayonara Natsu no Lychee / Sonoko Kawai with Onyanko Club; 16. Koi no Chapter AtoZ / Sonoko Kawai with Onyanko Club; 17. Oyoshi ni Natte ne TEACHER / Onyanko Club; 18. Makka na Jitensha / Onyanko Club; 【Encore】 E-01. Sailor Fuku wo Nugasanaide / Onyanko Club

=== 40th Anniversary Concert - Final Legend ===
This reunion concert took place July 5, 2025, celebrating 40 years since 1985, the year that the group was recruited and debuted. Eri Nitta, Aki Kihara, Harumi Tomikawa, Rika Tatemi, Asako Shiraishi, Mutsumi Yokota, Tomoko Nunokawa, Kayo Wagatsuma, Miyuki Sugiura all sang on this concert.

== Subgroups ==
=== Ushiroyubi Sasaregumi ===
Ushiroyubi Sasaregumi (うしろゆびさされ組) was the first subgroup with Mamiko Takai (#16) and Yukiko Iwai aka "Yuuyu" (#19) and released six singles and three albums from 1985 to 1987.

=== Nyangilas ===
Nyangilas (ニャンギラス, Nyangirasu) was the second of three offshoot groups within Onyanko Club. They had the shortest run with only two singles and one album. Members consisted of Aki Kihara (#6), Mika Nagoya (#9), Rika Tatsumi (#15) and Mako Shiraishi (#22).

=== Ushirogami Hikaretai ===
Ushirogami Hikaretai (うしろ髪ひかれ隊) consisted of Shizuka Kudo (#38), Akiko Ikuina (#40) and Makiko Saito (#42) and released five singles, two studio albums and one live album in 1987 and 1988.

== See also ==
- Musukko Club, an all-male group formed in May 1986 following the popularity of Onyanko Club.
