= No More Renai Gokko =

Single by Onyanko Club
- Language: Japanese
- A-side: "Koi wa Question"
- B-side: "Anata Dake Oyasumi Nasai"
- Released: January 21, 1987
- Label: Canyon
- Composer: Tsugutoshi Gotō
- Lyricist: Yasushi Akimoto

Onyanko Club singles chronology
"Koi wa Question" (1986)	"No More Renai Gokko" (1987)	"Katatsumuri Samba" (1987)

"No More Renai Gokko" (NO MORE 恋愛ごっこ) is the 7th single by the Japanese idol girl group Onyanko Club. It was released in Japan on January 21, 1987.

== Track listing ==
All lyrics are written by Yasushi Akimoto.

No.	Title	Music	Length
1.	"No More Renai Gokko" (NO MORE 恋愛ごっこ)	Tsugutoshi Gotō
2.	"Anata Dake Oyasumi Nasai" (あなただけ おやすみなさい)	Ken Takahashi

== Charts ==
=== Weekly charts ===
Chart (1987)	Peak position
Japan (Oricon)	1

=== Year-end charts ===
Chart (1987)	Peak position
Japan (Oricon)	83

== See also ==
- 1987 in Japanese music
