= Yume Catalogue =

Studio album by Onyanko Club
- Released: March 10, 1986
- Genre: J-pop; kayōkyoku; teen pop
- Language: Japanese
- Label: Canyon

Onyanko Club chronology
Kick Off (1985)	Yume Catalogue (1986)	Panic the World (1986)

Singles from Yume Catalogue
- 1. "Oyoshi ni Natte ne Teacher" Released: October 21, 1986

Yume Catalogue (夢カタログ; Dream Catalogue) is the second studio album by the Japanese girl idol girl group Onyanko Club. It was released in Japan on March 10, 1986.

== Track listing ==
All lyrics, except "Yume no Hanataba", by Yasushi Akimoto.

No.	Title	Lyrics	Length
1.	"Oyoshi ni Natte ne Teacher" (およしになってねTEACHER)
2.	"Seiza Uranai de Hitomi o Tojite" (星座占いで瞳を閉じて)
3.	"Seaside Session" (シーサイド・セッション)
4.	"Suki ni Natte mo Kurenai" (好きになってもくれない)
5.	"Linda" (LINDA)
6.	"Alelele" (アレレレ)
7.	"Renai Omimai Mōshiagemasu" (恋愛御見舞申し上げます)
8.	"Umbrella Angel" (アンブレラ・エンジェル)
9.	"Mado kara Miteru P.T.A." (窓から見てるP・T・A)
10.	"Yume no Hanataba" (夢の花束)	Haruo Hayashi

== Charts ==
=== Weekly charts ===
Chart (1986)	Peak position
Japan (Oricon)	1

== See also ==
- 1986 in Japanese music
