= Oyoshi ni Natte ne Teacher =

Single by Onyanko Club

from the album Yume Catalogue
- Language: Japanese
- A-side: "Oyoshi ni Natte ne Teacher"
- B-side: "Teddy Bear no Kei (Shōjo no Kaori)"
- Released: October 21, 1985
- Genre: J-pop; kayōkyoku; teen pop
- Label: Canyon
- Composer: Jun Satō
- Lyricist: Yasushi Akimoto

Onyanko Club singles chronology
"Sailor Fuku o Nugasanai de" (1985)	"Oyoshi ni Natte ne Teacher" (1985)	"Jā ne" (1986)

"Oyoshi ni Natte ne Teacher" (およしになってねTEACHER) is the 2nd single by the Japanese idol girl group Onyanko Club. It was released in Japan on October 21, 1985.

== Outline ==
The song is about a high school girl who nearly flunks her math exam and uses her charm to seduce a male teacher, but refuses to cross the line. The lyrics has been criticized as "justifying child prostitution".

== Track listing ==
All lyrics are written by Yasushi Akimoto; all music is composed by Jun Satō.

No.	Title	Artist(s)	Length
1.	"Oyoshi ni Natte ne Teacher" (およしになってねTEACHER)
2.	"Teddy Bear no Kei (Shōjo no Kaori)" (テディベアの頃 -少女の香り-)	Eri Nitta + Onyanko Club (Miharu Nakajima, Satomi Fukunaga, Kazuko Utsumi)

== Charts ==
=== Weekly charts ===
Chart (1985)	Peak position
Japan (Oricon)	2

=== Year-end charts ===
Chart (1985)	Peak position
Japan (Oricon)	89

== See also ==
- 1985 in Japanese music
