= Osaki ni Shitsurei =

Single by Onyanko Club
- Language: Japanese
- A-side: "Osaki ni Shitsurei"
- B-side: "Print no Natsu"
- Released: July 21, 1986
- Label: Canyon
- Composer(s): Tsugutoshi Gotō
- Lyricist(s): Yasushi Akimoto

Onyanko Club singles chronology
"Otto Chikan!" (1986)	"Osaki ni Shitsurei" (1986)	"Koi wa Question" (1986)

"Osaki ni Shitsurei" (お先に失礼) is the 5th single by the Japanese idol girl group Onyanko Club. It was released in Japan on July 21, 1986.

== Outline ==
The single, although not being released with, was used as the main theme for Onyanko the Movie: Close Call!, starring Onyanko Club. This song marked the first time that Yukiko Iwai became one of the lead vocalists.

This would also be the second instance of Kazuko Utsumi singing a B side, as she did with Omoide Bijin on the single Otto CHIKAN!

== Track listing ==
All lyrics are written by Yasushi Akimoto.

No.	Title	Music	Length
1.	"Osaki ni Shitsurei" (お先に失礼)	Tsugutoshi Gotō
2.	"Print no Natsu" (プリントの夏)	Jun Satō

== Charts ==
=== Weekly charts ===
Chart (1986)	Peak position
Japan (Oricon)	1

=== Year-end charts ===
Chart (1986)	Peak position
Japan (Oricon)	69

== See also ==
- 1986 in Japanese music
