= Katatsumuri Samba =

Single by Onyanko Club
- Language: Japanese
- A-side: "Katatsumuri Samba"
- B-side: "Meshibe to Oshibe"
- Released: May 21, 1987
- Label: Canyon
- Composer: Tsugutoshi Gotō
- Lyricist: Yasushi Akimoto

Onyanko Club singles chronology
"No More Renai Gokko" (1987)	"Katatsumuri Samba" (1987)	"Wedding Dress" (1987)

"Katatsumuri Samba" (かたつむりサンバ) is the 8th single by the Japanese idol girl group Onyanko Club. It was released in Japan on May 21, 1987. It held the record for being the worst-sold number 1 single for a while.

== Track listing ==
All lyrics are written by Yasushi Akimoto; all music is composed by Tsugutoshi Gotō.

No.	Title	Length
1.	"Katatsumuri Samba" (かたつむりサンバ)
2.	"Meshibe to Oshibe" (めしべとおしべ)

== Charts ==
=== Weekly charts ===
Chart (1987)	Peak position
Japan (Oricon)	1

== See also ==
- 1987 in Japanese music
