= Jā ne =

Single by Onyanko Club

from the album Panic the World
- Language: Japanese
- A-side: "Jā ne"
- B-side: "Alelele"
- Released: February 21, 1986
- Genre: J-pop
- Label: Canyon
- Composer(s): Ken Takahashi
- Lyricist(s): Yasushi Akimoto

Onyanko Club singles chronology
"Oyoshi ni Natte ne Teacher" (1985)	"Jā ne" (1986)	"Otto Chikan!" (1986)

"Jā ne" (じゃあね; "See Ya") is the third single by the Japanese idol girl group Onyanko Club. It was released in Japan on February 21, 1986.

== Outline ==
This song was written for the graduation of Miharu Nakajima from Onyanko Club in March 1986. Sonoko Kawai would graduate with her, however, this song focuses on Nakajima's graduation, as Kawai did not decide to graduate until shortly after Nakajima, and she would continue to work as a solo artist after this, but Nakajima will retire from the entertainment industry on this occasion. Therefore, on the record jacket, Nakajima is emphasized and Kawai is not in the photo. According to an official, Kawai herself was agreeable to this treatment.

== Track listing ==
All lyrics are written by Yasushi Akimoto.

No.	Title	Music	Length
1.	"Jā ne" (じゃあね)	Ken Takahashi
2.	"Alelele" (アレレレ)	Jun Satō

== Charts ==
=== Weekly charts ===
Chart (1986)	Peak position
Japan (Oricon)	1

=== Year-end charts ===
Chart (1986)	Peak position
Japan (Oricon)	23

== Cover versions ==
- The Nolans covered the song in English as "Johnny" in their 1991 album Tidal Wave (Samishii Nettaigyo).

== See also ==
- 1986 in Japanese music
