= Koi wa Question =

- Reverse side cover

Single by Onyanko Club

from the album NON-STOP Oyanko Club
- Language: Japanese
- A-side: "Koi wa Question"
- B-side: "Anmitsu Daisakusen"
- Released: November 1, 1986
- Label: Canyon
- Composer(s): Akira Mitake
- Lyricist(s): Yasushi Akimoto

Onyanko Club singles chronology
"Osaki ni Shitsurei" (1986)	"Koi wa Question" (1986)	"No More Renai Gokko" (1987)

"Koi wa Question" (恋はくえすちょん) is the 6th single by the Japanese idol girl group Onyanko Club. It was released in Japan on November 1, 1986. This song is considered one of Onyanko Club's most accomplished works. The song serves as the opening theme song for the 1986-1987 anime television series Anmitsu Hime. The single's second track "Anmitsu Daisakusen" serves as the show's ending theme.

== Track listing ==
All lyrics are written by Yasushi Akimoto.

No.	Title	Music	Length
1.	"Koi wa Question" (恋はくえすちょん)	Akira Mitake
2.	"Anmitsu Daisakusen" (あんみつ大作戦)	Hiroshi Nagasawa

== Charts ==
=== Weekly charts ===
Chart (1986)	Peak position
Japan (Oricon)	1

== See also ==
- 1986 in Japanese music
