= Ushirogami Hikaretai =

Japanese idol J-pop band

Ushirogami Hikaretai (うしろ髪ひかれ隊) was a Japanese idol J-pop band, active from 1987 to 1988. It was the third sub-group of Onyanko Club, consisting of three of its members: Shizuka Kudō, Akiko Ikuina, and Makiko Saitō, the group debuted during the "Onyanko Yumekojo Sailing 87'" tour.

== Biography ==
In April 1987, a new sub-group, Ushirogami Hikaretai, was formed to replace Ushiroyubi Sasaregumi, which was disbanded when Mamiko Takai graduated from Onyanko Club, and Shizuka Kudō, Akiko Ikuina, and Makiko Saitō were selected as its members. Initially, Noriko Kaise (貝瀬典子) was to be selected over Saitō, but it was concluded that Kaise was not suitable to be a member. At the time of its formation, Ikuina was considered the main figure. In May 1987, their debut song, Toki no Kawa wo Koete (時の河を越えて), was released. This song was the theme song for the anime High School! Kimengumi and ranked number one on the Oricon charts. The quality of this song is highly acclaimed, and some consider it the best Onyanko Club-related song. In July 1987, they hosted a radio show, Tokyo Best Hit (TOKYOベストヒット), along with TV personality Tsutomu Sekine. Although Onyanko Club disbanded in September 1987, Ushirogami Hikaretai continued its activities, and they held concerts, but their activities were suspended in May 1988. As a result, they released five singles and three albums, as well as a video of their concert held at the Tokyo Kōsei Nenkin Kaikan.

Kazuji Kasai (笠井一二, Kasai Kazuji), chief director of the variety show Yūyake Nyan Nyan ("Sunset Meow Meow") (夕やけニャンニャン), said their teamwork was pretty good. Musician Kenzō Saeki (サエキ けんぞう), who wrote the lyrics for Ushirogami Hikaretai's songs, noted that unlike other Onyanko Club songs, their songs were of very high quality because they were based on music that had been meticulously developed under the famous director Yūzō Watanabe (渡辺有三). He also considered them to be the legitimate successor of Candies.

In October 2008, its producer Yasushi Akimoto announced its re-formation as Watarirouka Hashiritai with four members from his new production AKB48, the modern successor of Onyanko Club. So far, Watarirouka Hashiritai has performed the second Blue Dragon (anime) opening Aoi Mirai (青い未来).

== Members ==
=== Shizuka Kudō ===
Shizuka Kudō (工藤静香, Kudō Shizuka, born April 14, 1970, in Ginza, Tokyo, Japan)

=== Akiko Ikuina ===
Akiko Ikuina (生稲晃子, Ikuina Akiko, born April 28, 1968, in Setagaya, Tokyo, Japan)

=== Makiko Saitō ===
Makiko Saitō (斎藤満喜子, Saitō Makiko, born September 19, 1970, in Hiroshima, Japan)

Her trademark was her very thick eyebrows, a trait she possessed from birth. After enrolling at Hiroshima Municipal Misuzugaoka Junior High School (美鈴が丘中学), she was a member of the track and field team. She also had an interest in the entertainment industry and auditioned for a number of shows, and at one point was an assistant on a local radio program. In April 1986, she enrolled at Shintoku Girls' High School (進徳女子高校), and in August 1986, she was selected as one of the runners-up at the Miss Seventeen contest sponsored by Shūeisha. The audition was a joint project with Yūyake Nyan Nyan ("Sunset Meow Meow") (夕やけニャンニャン), a variety show featuring the then very popular idol group Onyanko Club. This led her to become a member of Onyanko Club, and she started living in a dormitory in Tokyo with other Onyanko Club members who had also come from rural areas like her. She also attended Horikoshi High School, where many celebrities have been enrolled. In April 1987, she was selected as a member of the sub-group Ushirogami Hikaretai. In May 1988, Ushirogami Hikaretai went on hiatus. In July 1988, she made her solo debut with a song called Yaritai hōdai (やりたい放題, Yaritai hōdai) and also became one of the hosts of a TV show called Sing! Idol Dome (歌え!アイドルどーむ).

Subsequently, she often appeared on variety shows. As a reporter for a popular quiz show called Naruhodo! The World, she visited more than 25 countries. In 1998, She married Haruo Hibi (日比治雄, Hibi Haruo), the president of Meiraku Group (めいらくグループ), a food company, and had two children. In August 2021, she made her first public appearance since her marriage on a TV show hosted by Nobuo Serizawa, a professional golfer with whom she used to work on a golf program.

== Discography ==
Singles

- 1987.05.07: Toki no Kawa wo Koete
- 1987.08.12: Anata wo Shiritai
- 1987.11.11: Mobius no Koibito
- 1988.02.25: Horane, Haru ga Kita
- 1988.04.29: Kyou wa Saikou!

Albums

- 1987.09.05: Ushirogami Hikaretai
- 1988.03.05: BAB
- 1988.07.06: Hora ne, Haru ga Kita – First Concert (live)

== Videos ==
- メイドインハワイ [Made in Hawaii] (Videotape) (in Japanese). Tokyo, Japan: Pony Canyon. 1988-03-10. ASIN B000064NYM.
- ほらね春が来たファースト・コンサート'88 [You see, spring has come. First concert'88] (Videotape) (in Japanese). Tokyo, Japan: Pony Canyon. 1988-07-06. ASIN B000UVIYIE.
