= Musukko Club =

Japanese idol group

Musukko Club (息っ子クラブ) was a short-lived male spin-off idol group of Onyanko Club. They made their debut in 1986 with the song Boku-tachi no Season, and broke up after their February 15, 1987 concert at Nippon Budokan. The seven members of the group were Ken Iwashiro, Shūsuke Namiki, Yoshinori Satō, Yōji Sawamukai, Kō Shimizu, Hirotoshi Shinozaki and Hiromitsu Shizuku. After 3 decades, the group reunited in 2016 and has been active ever since.

== Discography ==
=== Singles ===
- Boku-tachi no Season/Kanojo wa Girlfriend, Epic/Sony, 07•5H-313, Single
- Chotto Karai Aitsu/Kimagure na Kimi ga Suki, Epic/Sony, 07•5H-332, Single

=== Albums ===
Songs that do not indicate a specific vocalist are sung by the entire group.

- 7 Junk Boys, Epic/Sony, 28•3H-266, LP

A1. Zenryaku I Love You
A2. Boku-tachi no Season
A3. Meisō no Machi (Yōji Sawamukai)
A4. Jungle Boy (Hiromitsu Shizuku)
A5. Kanojo wa Girlfriend (Yoshinori Satō)
A6. Ai no Mune o Hatte
B1. Chotto Karai Aitsu
B2. Hoshi no Dōbōsha (Ken Iwashiro)
B3. Me-Cha-She (Shūsuke Namiki & Hirotoshi Shinozaki)
B4. Onshitsu Sodachi no Melon-tachi (Kō Shimizu)
B5. Kimagure na Kimi ga Suki (Yoshinori Satō)

A CD by the same title was released as well, with one extra track:

- 7 Junk Boys, Epic/Sony, 32•8H-102, January 21, 1987, CD

1. Zenryaku I Love You
2. Boku-tachi no Season
3. Meisō no Machi (Yōji Sawamukai)
4. Jungle Boy (Hiromitsu Shizuku)
5. Kanojo wa Girlfriend (Yoshinori Satō)
6. Ai no Mune o Hatte
7. Chotto Karai Aitsu
8. Hoshi no Dōbōsha (Ken Iwashiro)
9. Me-Cha-She (Shūsuke Namiki & Hirotoshi Shinozaki)
10. Onshitsu Sodachi no Melon-tachi (Kō Shimizu)
11. Kimagure na Kimi ga Suki (Yoshinori Satō)
12. Kimi o Idaite Mitai (CD version of Chotto Karai Aitsu)

== Video releases ==
7 Junk Boys, Epic/Sony, VHS, 30 minutes, ¥4500
This video of their final concert features the following songs:

1. Boku-tachi no Season
2. Zenryaku I Love You
3. Meisō no Machi
4. Jungle Boy
5. Me-Cha-She
6. Hoshi no Dōbōsha
7. Onshitsu Sodachi no Melon-tachi
8. Kanojo wa Girlfriend
9. Boku-tachi no Season (reprise)
10. Chotto Karai Aitsu
