= Yukiko Iwai (singer) =

Japanese singer and actress (born 1968)

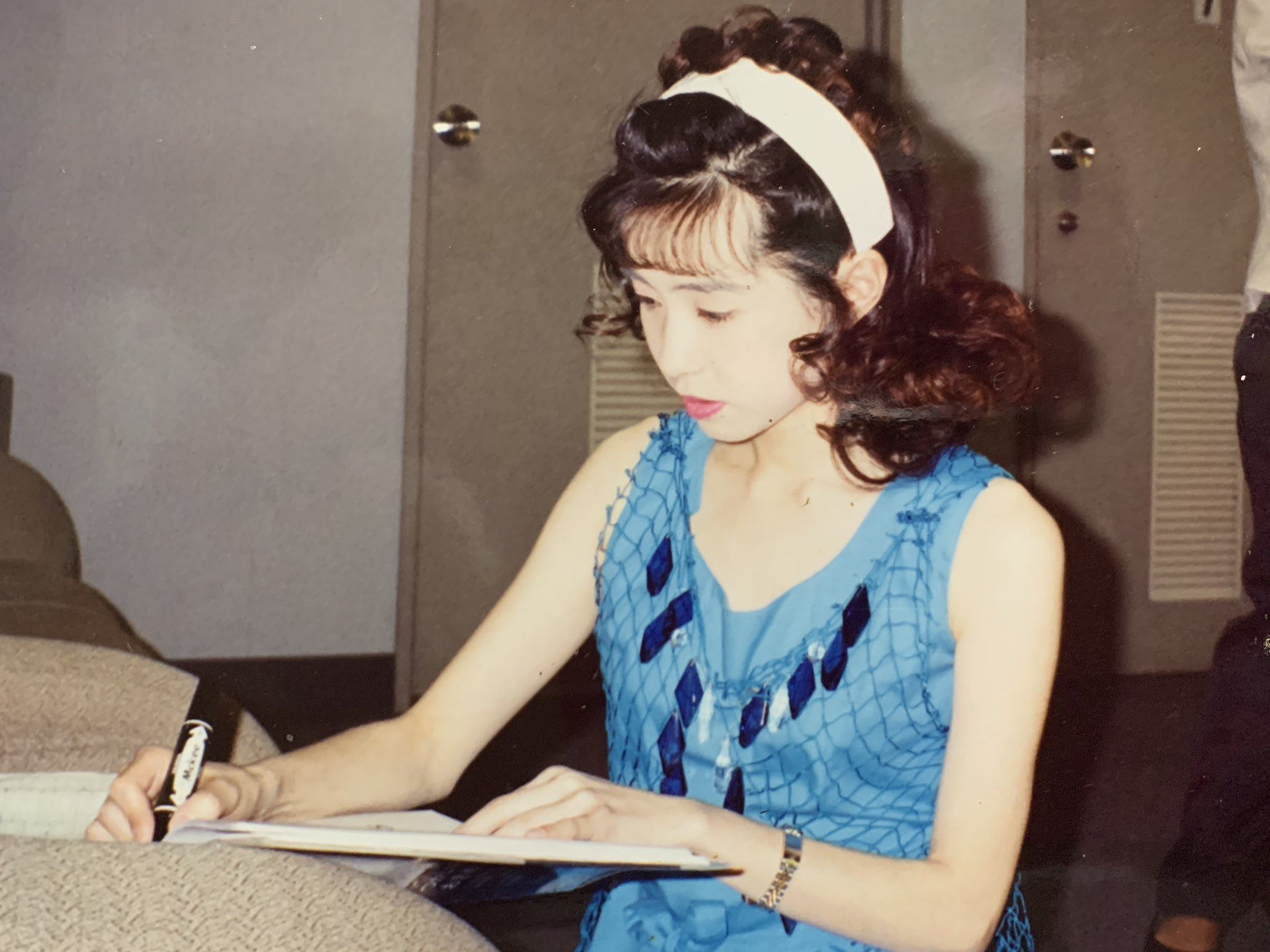
- Yukiko Iwai in 1993

Background information
- Also known as: Yūyu (ゆうゆ, Yūyu)
- Born: 岩井 由紀子; 26 May 1968 (age 57)
- Origin: Yokohama, Japan
- Genres: Jpop
- Occupations: Singer, actor
- Years active: 1987–1997
- Label: Pony Canyon

Yukiko Iwai (岩井 由紀子, Iwai Yukiko), also known by the nickname Yūyu (ゆうゆ, Yūyu), is a Japanese singer and actress born 26 May 1968 in Yokohama, Kanagawa Prefecture, Japan. Iwai was a member of the all-girl pop group Onyanko Club (from 21 June 1985 until 31 August 1987), and she was the shortest of all the members at 150 centimetres (4 ft 11 in). She was also half of the pop group Ushiroyubi Sasaregumi, a spin-off group of Onyanko Club. She graduated from Kaetsu Women's Junior High and High School (嘉悦女子高校) (now Kaetsu Ariake Junior High and High School), but left Kaetsu Women's Junior College (嘉悦女子短大) (now Kaetsu University Junior College) before she finished. She has an older sister, Akiko, who is four years older than her and is said to look just like her.

== Biography ==
She moved to Funabashi, Chiba Prefecture after her parents divorced when she was younger. She made her media debut in 1985 as a gravure model in Model Graphix (モデルグラフィックス), a magazine for which her older sister was on the editorial committee.

On 21 June 1985, she became the 19th member of Onyanko Club after auditioning on the TV program Yūyake Nyan Nyan, and she appeared on the cover of their first album, Kick Off. Shortly afterward, she and Mamiko Takai, also a member of Onyanko Club, formed the group Ushiroyubi Sasaregumi. She has been called by the nickname "Yūyu" since she was a little girl, and she was also called by that name on the program. Yukiko Iwai performed the lead vocals for Onyanko Club's fifth single, Osaki ni Shitsurei, released in July 1986. From that point, she became the main vocalist for the majority of their albums, and was considered central to the success of the group.

She made her solo debut with the single Angel Bodyguard(天使のボディーガード, Tenshi no Bodīgādo) on 25 March 1987. In April of that same year, Ushiroyubi Sasaregumi was disbanded because Takai graduated from Onyanko Club and moved on to other things. It was said that she and Takai did not get along, which she subsequently admitted on a TV program. Iwai felt that Takai was privileged by Yasushi Akimoto, a lyricist and broadcast writer at the time, which was also not amusing to her. The person she was closest to in Onyanko Club was Minayo Watanabe, who was a year younger than her, and Iwai claimed that unlike the other members, she treated even the younger members as equals. Onyanko Club itself disbanded in August later that year, and Iwai began working for Watanabe Productions (Nabe Pro) along with fellow Onyanko Club member Sonoko Kawai. She also began working under her nickname "Yūyu", turning it into a stage name.

Immediately after Yukiko Iwai turned solo, it became a "winter era of idols" in a reaction to the boom of Onyanko Club, and she retired from singer activity with Peter Pan Again (もう一度ピーターパン, Mōichido Pītā Pan) issued in February 1989. Since then, she has appeared in variety shows such as Quiz! Age Difference Doesn't Matter (クイズ!年の差なんて) and played an active role as an image character of the game software company Taito. In 1994, she changed her stage name back to her real name "Yukiko Iwai", but by this time her activity was sluggish.

In 1997, she married a businessman after she split with entertainer Hideyuki Nakayama, with whom she had been dating for many years. At this time, she refused to hold a press conference with the media, saying she had nothing else to say. Then, she virtually retired from the entertainment industry. Note that she expressed her admiration for DINK after Takai's marriage and stated that she loathed children. However, she had two children after her marriage. In 2002, she participated in the reunion event of Onyanko Club. Since then, however, she has not been seen in public.

== Discography ==
Singles

- 1987.03.25 : Angel Bodyguard(天使のボディーガード, Tenshi no Bodīgādo) (with Onyanko Club)
- 1987.07.22 : -3 °C (-3 °C, Mainasu Sando)
- 1987.10.28 : Full Moon of Twenty-five Cent (25セントの満月, Nijūgo Sento no Mangetsu)
- 1988.01.21 : I Cannot Follow ~Good Luck, Boyfriend~ (ついて行けない ~がんばれボーイフレンド~, Tsuite Ikenai ~Gambare Boyfriend~)
- 1988.04.21 : Around the Left Chest (左胸あたり, Hidarimune Atari)
- 1988.07.27 : I Intend to Goodbye (サヨナラ志願, Sayonara Shigan)
- 1988.11.30 : Gangster of the Starry Sky (星空のギャングスター, Hoshizora no Gangster)
- 1989.02.08 : Peter Pan Again (もう一度ピーターパン, Mōichido Pīta Pan)
  The opening theme of "the Adventures of Peter Pan". The coupling song "Dream, Open Sesame!" (夢よ開けゴマ!, Yume yo Hirake Goma) is the ending theme of "the Adventures of Peter Pan".

Albums

- 1987.07.29 : Yūyu Ray (ゆうゆ光線)
- 1987.12.16 : No! (いやっ!)
- 1988.07.21 : Summer Tasty (Summer Tasty)
- 1988.07.21 : It's thick! (こってるネ!, Kotteru Ne!)

Compilations

- 1989.03.21 : It's the Best! (ベストだもんね!, Best Damon Ne!)
- 2002.02.20 : My Favorite! Colle!ction Yūyu Best (MY これ!クション ゆうゆ BEST, My Kore!kushon YuuYu Best)
- 2007.08.17 : Yūyu Singles Complete (ゆうゆSINGLESコンプリート, Yūyu Singles Complete)

== Appearance on TV ==
Variety shows

- Sing! Idol Dome (歌え!アイドルどーむ) (from October 1987 to September 1988)
- Quiz! Age Difference Doesn't Matter (クイズ!年の差なんて) (from October 1988 to September 1994)

Anime

- High School! Kimengumi (from October 1985 to September 1987)
  As the spin-off group Ushiroyubi Sasaregumi.
- The Adventures of Peter Pan (from January 1989 to December 1989)
  As the singer of theme songs.

== Videos ==
- ゆうゆファーストコンサート ボクらは元気なゆうゆ印 [Yūyu First Concert We're the energetic Yūyu faction] (Videotape) (in Japanese). Tokyo, Japan: Pony Canyon. 1 March 1988. ASIN B011HMAAJ0.
- ボンジョールノ! ゆうゆ イタリア・パック・ツアー [Buon giorno! Yūyu Italian pack tour] (Videotape) (in Japanese). Tokyo, Japan: Pony Canyon. 10 August 1987.

== Video games ==
- Yūyu no Quiz de Go! Go! (Taito arcade game released in 1991, ported for the Super Famicom in 1992)
