= Sailor Fuku o Nugasanai de =

Single by Onyanko Club

from the album Kick Off
- Language: Japanese
- English title: Don't Make Me Take Off My Sailor Uniform
- B-side: "Haya Sugiru Sedai"
- Released: July 5, 1985
- Recorded: 1985
- Genre: J-pop; kayōkyoku; teen pop
- Length: 3:48
- Label: Canyon
- Composer: Jun Satō
- Lyricist: Yasushi Akimoto
- Producers: Hiroshi Ishida; Kazuji Kasai; Hiroshi Watanabe

Onyanko Club singles chronology
"Sailor Fuku o Nugasanai de" (1985)	"Oyoshi ni Natte ne Teacher" (1985)

"Sailor Fuku o Nugasanai de" (セーラー服を脱がさないで, Sērā Fuku o Nugasanai de; lit. "Don't Make Me Take Off My Sailor Uniform") is the debut single by Japanese idol girl group Onyanko Club. It was released by Canyon Records on July 5, 1985. Its music was composed by Jun Satō, and its lyrics were written by Yasushi Akimoto.

== Background ==
The song describes a school girl's desire to explore her sexuality.

At the time of the single's release, Onyanko Club had 14 members. Lead vocalists (hereinafter referred to as "front vocals") for the single were Eri Nitta (number 4), Miharu Nakajima (number 5), Satomi Fukunaga (number 11) and Kazuko Utsumi (number 13). Of the 14 members, several members, such as Utsumi, Mika Nagoya (number 9) and Sanae Jounouchi (number 17), had experience in the performing arts prior to joining the group. Utsumi was selected as one of the front vocals because in the pre-Onyanko Club years she had taken vocal lessons at a music school established by Masaaki Hirao, who was a critically acclaimed singer-songwriter and music producer in the Japanese pop music industry. Also, certain members, namely Sayuri Kokusho (number 8), Sonoko Kawai (number 12) and Jounouchi, were left out of selection for front vocals because they already were under contract with CBS/Sony Records.

On July 4, 1985, a day before the single's release, a single release and handshake event was scheduled at Sunshine City in Ikebukuro, Tokyo, which was the mecca of the idol scene at the time. The event was expected to have an attendance of about 500 people. However, over 4,000 people showed up at the site. As a result of reported injuries and concerns over possible stampede, the event was canceled at the last minute before the group was set to appear on stage.

== Commercial performance ==
The single debuted at number 34 and peaked at number five on the Oricon's Japanese singles chart and The Best Ten's singles charts. It landed on number 35 on the Oricon's 1985 year-end singles chart. By June 1986, over 510,000 copies were sold.

== Track listing ==
All lyrics are written by Yasushi Akimoto; all music is composed and arranged by Jun Satō.

7-inch vinyl
No.	Title	Length
1.	"Sailor Fuku o Nugasanai de" (Sērā Fuku o Nugasanai de (セーラー服を脱がさないで; lit. "Don't Make Me Take Off My Sailor Uniform"))	3:48
2.	"Haya Sugiru Sedai" ((早すぎる世代; lit. "A Generation Too Early"))	3:36

== Charts ==
=== Weekly charts ===
Chart (1985)	Peak position
Japan (Oricon)	5
Japan (The Best Ten)	5

=== Year-end charts ===
Chart (1985)	Peak position
Japan (Oricon)	35

== Cover versions ==
- Shōko Hamada covered the song in her 2007 covers album Hamashō Album ~O teate Shimashōko~.
- Cover Song Dolls covered the song in their 2007 self-titled album.
- AKB48 covered the song in the 2010 variety program Show Battle.
- VIP Tenchō covered the song in their album No.
- Long Vacation featuring Arimi Matsuno, Maki Miyamae, and Qlair covered the song in the 2012 album Long Vacation 20th Anniversary Collection Vol. 4.

== See also ==
- 1985 in Japanese music
