= Minayo Watanabe =

Japanese idol and singer (born 1969)

- Born: September 28, 1969 (age 57)
- Origin: Nishiharu, Aichi Prefecture, Japan
- Genres: J-pop, pop
- Occupations: Idol, singer
- Years active: 1985–present
- Formerly of: Onyanko Club

Minayo Watanabe (渡辺 美奈代; born September 28, 1969) is a Japanese idol and singer. She debuted as member number 29 of the idol group Onyanko Club. As she was one of the most popular members, in 1986 she started releasing solo songs. Her solo career continued after the group disbanded in 1987.

== Biography ==
She has an elder brother, an elder sister, and a younger sister. She was born in Gifu Prefecture, but moved to Nishikasugai District in Aichi Prefecture when she was two years old. Her father owned a construction company. Once she enrolled at Tenjin Junior High School (天神中学校), she became obsessed with table tennis.

In April 1985, she enrolled at Inazawa Girls' High School (稲沢女子高校) in the local area and also attended a celebrity training school in Nagoya. This led to her being scouted by CBS Sony Records. She also joined Burning Production (バーニングプロダクション), a leading entertainment agency, thus she quit high school and moved to Tokyo. Note that since Burning Production had limited the number of celebrities belonging to the agency, Megumi Mori (森恵), who was waiting for her debut as a singer, was released to its affiliate agency after Watanabe, who was highly favored by Ikuo Suhō (周防郁夫), the president of Burning Production, joined the agency. In November 1985, she auditioned for the variety show Yūyake Nyan Nyan("Sunset Meow Meow") (夕やけニャンニャン) on Fuji TV and was accepted along with Mutsumi Yokota (横田睦美), Chiaki Mikami (三上千晶), and Yūko Yajima (矢島裕子). Unlike usually, the audition at this time was a joint project with the popular radio program Young Paradise (ヤングパラダイス), featuring comedian Yūji Miyake (三宅裕司) as DJ, and they were also looking for a poster girl for the radio program. In December 1985, she and Yokota became regular performers on a radio program called Onyanko no Abunai Yorudayo (おニャン子のアブない夜だよ), featuring Sonoko Kawai and Sayuri Kokushō as DJs.

In February 1986, when Kokushō made her solo debut with the song Valentine Kiss, she and Mako Shiraishi served as backing vocalists. In March 1986, Kawai and Kokushō left the radio program, and Shiraishi was joined as a new DJ. Shortly thereafter, Watanabe caused controversy by saying on the program that "the old ladies were no longer here". In response, Kawai retorted, "When Minayo-chan turns 20, will you be able to maintain your youthfulness like I have?" In April 1986, she enrolled at Horikoshi High School, where many celebrities have attended. In July 1986, a large-scale Handshake Event (握手会, Akushukai) was held at the Nippon Budokan, and she shook hands with 12,000 fans who gathered there. Shortly thereafter, she made her solo debut with the song Hitomi ni Yakusoku (瞳に約束), which ranked No. 1 on the Oricon in its first appearance. As a result, she had five consecutive No. 1 songs since her debut as a solo singer. In November 1986, she released her debut album called Alfalfa (Alfalfa).

In January 1987, she suddenly started crying while singing her new song Too Adult (Too Adult) on Yūyake Nyan Nyan. The reason was that she was emotionally unstable due to a poor rehearsal for a popular singing show called Yoru no Hit Studio (夜のヒットスタジオ). In April 1987, she started a radio program called Senobishite Rouge (背のびしてルージュ, Senobishite Rūju). She remained with the group until September 1987, when Onyanko Club disbanded. She was positioned as a new leader of Onyanko Club. She was considered a legitimate beauty among the Onyanko Club members, many of whom were said to be not very good looking. In addition, Yasushi Akimoto, who was deeply involved with Onyanko Club, described her as "like she was born to be an idol." Since her debut as a solo singer in July 1986, she remained one of the most popular members of the group. She and another popular member, Marina Watanabe, were referred to as W Watanabe (W渡辺, Daburu Watanabe), and the two were frequently compared.

After the disbandment of Onyanko Club, she often appeared not only as a singer but also on variety shows such as Ken Shimura's I'm All Right (志村けんのだいじょうぶだぁ). In the mid-1990s, she released several semi-nude photo books. In 1996, she married Masaki Yajima (矢島昌樹, Yajima Masaki), a member of the rockabilly band Hot Sox, and had two children. When she gave birth to her first son in 1997, she released a video of the birth. In 2002, she participated in the reunion of Onyanko Club. She has since continued her entertainment career while also being involved in a nail salon and an interior design store. In addition, her two sons also made their debut in the entertainment industry.

== Discography ==
=== Singles ===
No	Title	Release date	Oricon Weekly Singles Chart	Album
1	"Hitomi ni Yakusoku" (瞳に約束)	July 16, 1986	1	Alfalfa
2	"Yuki no Kaerimichi" (雪の帰り道)	October 15, 1986	1	Alfalfa
3	"TOO ADULT"	January 15, 1987	1	Hopping
4	"PINK no CHAO" (PINKのCHAO)	April 15, 1987	1	Hopping
5	"Amaryllis" (アマリリス)	July 29, 1987	1	Frill
6	"Girls on the Roof" (ガールズ・オン・ザ・ルーフ)	November 18, 1987	2	Frill
7	"Ryote Ippai no Memory" (両手いっぱいのメモリー)	February 26, 1988	10	Kiss! Kiss! Kiss!
8	"Chotto Fallin' Love" (ちょっとFallin’Love)	May 18, 1988	6	My Boy
9	"Daite Ageru" (抱いてあげる)	August 3, 1988	6	The Heart of Love
10	"Ii ja Nai" (いいじゃない)	November 9, 1989	13	The Heart of Love
11	"Ai ga Nakucha, ne!" (愛がなくちゃ、ネッ!)	January 21, 1989	14	Kiss! Kiss! Kiss!
12	"Winter Spring, Summer Fall" (Winterスプリング、Summerフォール)	June 14, 1989	14	Kiss! Kiss! Kiss!
13	"Romance Kōitten" (恋愛(ロマンス)紅一点)	November 22, 1989	34	Kiss! Kiss! Kiss!
14	"Pizzicato Princess" (ピチカートプリンセス)	August 22, 1990	43	Will
15	"Hanako no Kekkon" (Hanakoの結婚)	August 23, 1991	90	Will
16	"Ofuro de GO!" (オフロでGO!)	April 26, 1995		—
17	"Iroiro Attakedo" (いろいろあったけど)	April 24, 1996		—

=== Albums ===
==== Studio albums ====
No	Title	Release date
1	Alfalfa (アルファルファ)	November 29, 1986
2	Hopping (ホッピング)	May 28, 1987
3	Frill (フリル)	December 21, 1987
—	Sweet Little Songs: Mini-album	July 1, 1988
4	My Boy: Utae! Taiyō - a summer place (My Boy -歌え! 太陽- a summer place)	August 19, 1988
5	The Heart of Love: Koishiteru to, Ii ne (the Heart of Love ~恋してると、いいね~)	February 10, 1989

==== Best-of albums ====
Title	Release date	Oricon Weekly Albums Chart
Kiss! Kiss! Kiss!: Minayo Watanabe Best (KISS! KISS! KISS! -MINAYO WATANABE BEST-)	December 21, 1989	31
Will: Minayo Selections (WILL ~MINAYO SELECTIONS~)	October 21, 1991	
Watanabe Minayo Best Collection (渡辺美奈代ベスト・コレクション)	July 21, 1997	
Golden Best - Watanabe Minayo Singles (GOLDEN☆BEST 渡辺美奈代 SINGLES)	November 20, 2002	

== Videos ==
- 壁の向うに誰かいる! [Someone is behind the wall!] (Videotape) (in Japanese). Tokyo, Japan: BMG JAPAN (BMG JAPAN). 1992-02-05. ASIN B000064MWD.
- スリル [Thrill] (Videotape) (in Japanese). Tokyo, Japan: BMG JAPAN (BMG JAPAN). 1993-02-05. ASIN B00005FSYA.
