= Sanae Jōnouchi =

Japanese singer and actress (born 1968)

- 城之内早苗
- Born: 17 May 1968 (age 57); Kamisu, Ibaraki Prefecture, Japan

Sanae Kimura (Japanese: 木村 早苗; born 17 May 1968), known by her birth name of Sanae Jōnouchi (Japanese: 城之内早苗), is a Japanese enka singer, actress and radio presenter.

== Life and career ==
Born in Kamisu, while in her second year of junior high school Jōnouchi made her singing debut participating in the 'All Japan Enka Championship', a music competition organized by Tokyo 12 Channel (now TV Tokyo) and CBS Sony. In 1985 she entered the popular idol group Onyanko Club, and in 1986 she made her solo record debut with the single Ajisai-bashi; the song topped the Oricon Singles Chart, the first song in the enka genre to achieve this result. After the group disbanded, she appeared in several television shows, started an acting career on stage, and hosted the radio program Jōnouchi sanae no hātofuru daiarī ("Sanae Jonouchi's Heartful Diary"). In 1995, she married the television director and producer Tadahiro Kimura.

In 2016, Jōnouchi was the recipient of the Japan Society of Composers Excellence Award at the 58th Japan Record Awards. On 23 October 2019, she released Sanae Uta, her first studio album in 32 years.
