= Kick Off (album) =

Studio album by Onyanko Club
- Released: September 21, 1985
- Genre: J-pop; kayōkyoku; teen pop
- Language: Japanese
- Label: Canyon

Onyanko Club chronology
Kick Off (1985)	Yume Catalogue (1986)

Singles from Kick Off
- 1. "Sailor Fuku o Nugasanai de" Released: July 5, 1985

Kick Off (stylized as KICK OFF) is the first studio album by the Japanese idol girl group Onyanko Club. It was released in Japan on September 21, 1985.

== Track listing ==
All lyrics are written by Yasushi Akimoto.

No.	Title	Length
1.	"Ijiwaru ne Darlin'" (いじわるねDarlin')
2.	"Makka na Jitensha" (真赤な自転車)
3.	"Shh! Ai wa Oshizuka ni..." (シーッ!愛はお静かに…)
4.	"Sailor Fuku o Nugasanai de" (セーラー服を脱がさないで)
5.	"Natsu no Christmas" (夏のクリスマス)
6.	"Ai no Rinri Shakai" (愛の倫理社会)
7.	"Haya Sugiru Sedai" (早すぎる世代)
8.	"Fen o Kikasete" (FENを聴かせて)
9.	"Like a Cherry Boy" (LIKE A CHERRY BOY)
10.	"Hōkago ni Ochikonda Shōjo" (放課後に落ち込んだ少女)

== Charts ==
=== Weekly charts ===
Chart (1985)	Peak position
Japan (Oricon)	2

== See also ==
- 1985 in Japanese music
