= Marina Watanabe =

Japanese actress, singer, and TV-personality (born 1970)

Marina Watanabe (渡辺 満里奈, Watanabe Marina, born November 18, 1970) is a Japanese actress, singer, and TV-personality. She was born in Ota, Tokyo, Japan, and is currently married to Jun Nagura of the comedy trio Neptune. She is a former Japanese idol singer who is now known as a television commentator and author who speaks about fashion, travel, personal health, and contemporary issues.

== History ==
=== Biography ===
Marina Watanabe was born and raised in Kamata, Tokyo. It is said that her father named his daughter "Marina", an unusual name in Japan which comes from Latin, because he enjoyed yachting. On the other hand, it is also said that her mother decided chose this name.

When she was 14 years old, she entered the Miss Seventeen Contest co-sponsored by CBS Sony and Shueisha at the encouragement of her mother and older sister, but was not selected. However, CBS Sony invited her to take singing lessons for a while. In March 1986, she was discovered by star agents, and subsequently passed her audition tests to become an idol in the same year. Soon after, she joined the all-girl idol group Onyanko Club. It was during her time within the group that she made her debut. Her debut song "Shin Koukyuu Shite" (to breathe deep) became a number one song on Oricon charts, and later got her in the record books for setting the record for the youngest singer to have a number 1 Oricon hit (a record that stood for 15 years until it was broken by a member of the Morning Musume group in 2001). She was 15-years and 11-months old at the time.

After her idol club was disbanded, Watanabe continued to participate in various variety shows as a singer. Initially she used mainstream idol clothing in her performances. However, because she decided to purchase her own clothes and design her performance style while abandoning traditional idol styles, she became more popular. Later, she was found to have talent as a comedian, thus she decided to take on more diverse roles such as that of a variety show announcer with a comedic yet sophisticated touch. It was from this period on that others started to notice that she was trying to hide or down-play the fact that she once was a member of an idol group.

Throughout the 1990s she continued to build broad networks within the subculture genre of Japan as both an announcer and celebrity, which eventually led to her rising popularity.

Currently, she is famous in Japan for her essays and books concerning her hobbies of fashion, travel, and personal health. She is also known widely as a "Taiwan-know-all".

=== Personal life ===
After marriage to her husband in 2005, her official name was changed to Nagura Marina, as she adopted her husband's surname "Nagura". However, she continues to work with her old maiden name, Watanabe Marina. She gave birth to her first child, a son, in December 2008. She gave birth to a daughter on June 24, 2010.

== Discography ==
=== Singles ===
- "Shin Koukyuu Shite" (1986)
- "Howaito Rabitto no Meseeji" (1987)
- "Marina no Natsu" (1987)
- "Natsuyasumi dake no Saidosheeto" (1987)
- "Chiisana Breakin' my heart" (1987)
- "Mitsumete agetai" (1988)
- "Natsu no Tanpen" (1988)
- "Mou Yume kara Samenaide" (1988)
- "Calendar" (1989)
- "Niji no Shounen" (1989)
- "Mune ga Ippai" (1989)
- "Atarashii Kimochi" (1990)
- "Daisukina Shatsu" (1990)
- "Shiawase no Rinkaku" (1991)
- "Birthday Boy" (1992)
- "Ureshii Yokan" (1995)
- "Taiyou to Hanauta" (1997)

=== Albums ===
- Marina (1987)
- Evergreen (1987)
- Christmas Tales (1987)
- Diary (1988)
- Sunny Side (1988)
- Miss (1989)
- Two of Us (1989)
- A Piece of Cake! (1990)
- Funny Face (1990)
- Mood Moonish (1991)
- Ring-a-Bell (1996)
- Watanabe Marina Best Collection (1997)

== Television appearances ==
=== TV dramas ===
- Kangofu Akademi-, Fuji TV 1987
- Osana Tsuma! Mama ha Abunai 17sai!, Fuji TV 1987
- Tokimekizakari, Fuji TV 1988
- Shinkon Monogatari, NTV 1988
- Yonimo Kimyouna Monogatari , Fuji TV 1990, 1991, 1992
- Waru, Yomiuri TV 1992
- O-cha no Ma, Yomiuri TV 1993
- Kachou-san no Kainen, TBS 1993
- Moshimo Negai ga Kanasu nara, TBS 1994
- Kami-san no Waruguchi 2, TBS 1995
- Dear U-man, TBS 1996
- Piichina Kankei, NTV 1999
- Face ~ Mishiranu Koibito, NTV 2001

=== Film ===
- Out (2023)

=== Variety shows ===
- Yuuyake Nyan Nyan, Fuji TV
- Tonneruzu no mina-san no Okage desu, Fuji TV
- Gakkou e Ikkou!, TBS
- Zenigata Kintarou, TV Asahi
- Takeshi no Daredemo Pikaso, TV Tokyo
- Doubutsu Kisou Tengai, TBS
- Oshare Kankei, NTV
- Janguru TV ~ Tamori no Kisoku ~, TBS
- Puromomania, Fuji TV

== Radio appearances ==
- Watanabe Marina Kaze no Marina (FM Yokohama)
- Across The View (J-Wave)
- Tipness presents Watanabe Marina Boo-Star Rocket ~fit for life~ (Tokyo FM)

== Books ==
- Marina no Tamashii
- Marina no Tabibukure – Tawawa Taiwan –
- Amatsuyu na Gohoubi
- Piratisu Michi
