= Eri Nitta =

Japanese singer

Eri Nitta (新田 恵利, Nitta Eri; married name Eri Nagayama (長山 恵利, Nagayama Eri), March 17, 1968 in Kamifukuoka (now part of Fujimino), Saitama Prefecture, Japan) is a Japanese singer, actress, lyricist, and tarento. She made her professional debut as the fourth member of the all-female singing group Onyanko Club in 1985. She made her solo debut with the hit song Winter Opera Glasses (冬のオペラグラス, Fuyu no Opera Gurasu) on January 1, 1986. Nitta performed the opening and ending theme songs for the first 14 episodes of the Little Women anime television series from Nippon Animation.

Nitta attended and graduated from Fujimino Municipal Fukuoka Junior High School and Saitama Prefectural Fukuoka High School.

== History ==
Nitta made her first appearance as the fourth member of Onyanko Club in April 1985 with an appearance on the group's Fuji TV variety show Yūyake Nyan Nyan. While she initially wanted to quit show business soon after starting, she suddenly became the most senior member of the group on April 25, 1985, following the Shūkan bunshun smoking scandal in which five members (including the first three members) of Onyanko Club were fired.

In July of that same year, she made her debut as one of Onyanko Club's lead singers with the song Don't Make Me Take Off My Sailor Suit (セーラー服を脱がさないで, Sērāfuku o Nugasanai de). From that point, she was considered the "face" of Onyanko Club due to her popularity. After graduating from high school, she continued working in the entertainment field and signed with the talent management firm Bond Planning (株式会社ボンド企画, Kabushiki Kaisha Bondo Kikaku).

She made her solo debut on January 1, 1986, with the hit single Winter Opera Glasses, which reached number one on the Oricon charts and sold over 300,000 copies. This was the record for a debut single for a female solo artist until Oricon changed their rules regarding what was considered a "debut" for people who had previously been a member of a group; Yuki Uchida now holds the record for a debut single for a female solo artist. Nitta was given the title "The Million Dollar Smile" on her single covers, and her smile was referred to as the "Nitta Trump", due to the extraordinary price she commanded due to her popularity. She began to regularly release singles and albums from that point.

Just before her solo debut, her father suddenly died of pneumonia on December 24, 1985, after collapsing with a high fever on the set of a movie in Hawaii. During the year following the breakup of Onyanko Club in 1987, as her popularity began to wane, Nitta adopted the pen name of Eri (絵梨) (using kanji different from those used in her real name) and began writing lyrics for her own songs. In March 1990, she retired from the entertainment world after telling people she wanted to become a lyricist. She wrote the lyrics for the songs on her last single.

In 1994, Nitta released a photo book and essay in which she returned to show business. On August 8, 1996 (just before Fuji TV moved to their present location in Odaiba), a reunion event was held for the Yūyake Nyan Nyan TV series. Nitta later married the Fuji TV employee who was in charge of the event.

Together with many of the original members of Onyanko Club, Nitta released the single, Shōmikigen (ショーミキゲン) in 2002. On December 5 that same year, the newly reunited members performed the title song as well as Don't Make Me Take Off My Sailor Suit during the 2002 FNS Kayōsai event on Fuji TV. Takashi Okamura, one half of the comedy duo Ninety-nine, is a huge fan of Nitta, and she performed in the "Uta no Onēsan" (歌のお姉さん) section of his Tobukusuri variety show. Several years later, during the "Fuji TV 24-hour Police" parody segment of the Mecha-Mecha Iketeru! variety show, Nitta's husband was "shamefully arrested" as the "Onyanko Thief" (due to his having married Nitta). In a segment for the same show in 1999, Nitta fan and tarento Thane Camus and owarai duo Asarido visited Nitta's home.

Nitta has since worked as an actress, author, and essayist, as well as participating in the Tokyo community radio program Ginza Radiocity. She has also participated, along with fellow idols such as Toshikazu Fukawa and Chiemi Hori, in programming discussing the 1980s idol star movement. In 2007, she participated in the ōendan for the inauguration of the Kama Burning Heroes, a baseball club started by Rakyō Ide, an owarai performer and member of the talent group Takeshi Gundan.

== Discography ==
=== Singles ===
Year	Title	Details	Peak chart position (Oricon)
1986	"Fuyu no Opera Glasses" (冬のオペラグラス)	Released: January 1, 1986; B-side: "Romance wa Guuzen no Shiwaza" (with Onyanko Club) (ロマンスは偶然のしわざ)	#1
1986	"Koi no Rope wo Hodokanaide" (恋のロープをほどかないで)	Released: April 10, 1986; B-side: "Pink no Ribbon" (ピンクのリボン)	#1
1986	"Fushigi na Tejina no You ni" (不思議な手品のように)	Released: August 1, 1986; B-side: "Hoshi no Tegami" (星の手紙)	#1
1986	"Naisho de Love Story" (内緒で浪漫映画(ラブ・ストーリー))	Released: November 14, 1986; B-side: "Gin'iro no Souvenir" (銀色のスーベニール)	#1
1987	"Wakakusa no Shoutaijou" (若草の招待状)	Released: February 14, 1987; Ending theme to the anime Tales of Little Women; B-side: "Yuuhi to Kaze no Melody" (夕陽と風のメロディ)	#3
1987	"Circus Romance" (サーカス・ロマンス)	Released: June 17, 1987; B-side: "Panama no Chapeau" (パナマのシャポー)	#8
1987	"Deja Vu"	Released: September 5, 1987; B-side: "Chigasaki ni Se wo Mukete" (茅ヶ崎に背を向けて)	#15
1988	"WHO?"	Released: January 21, 1988; B-side: "Kare wo Akiramete" (彼をあきらめて)	#21
1988	"Rock and Roll Love Letter" (ロックンロール・ラブレター)	Released: July 21, 1988; Cover of Bay City Rollers' song; B-side: "Natsu no Koikaze" (夏の恋風)	#61
1988	"Sayonara no Kaze" (さよならの風)	Released: November 21, 1988; B-side: "Mobius no Futari" (メビウスの二人)	#72
1990	"Prologue -Iidasenakute-" (プロローグ -いいだせなくて-)	Released: February 21, 1990; B-side: "Mafuyu no Penny Lane" (真冬のペニーレーン)	—

=== Albums ===
==== Studio albums ====
- ERI (1986) (1990, re-release)
- E-AREA (1987)
- ritardando (1987)
- Image (1987)

==== Compilation albums ====
- Nitta Eri Best (新田恵利 ベスト) (1987)
- Nitta Eri BEST 16 (新田恵利 BEST 16) (1989)
- Last Message (1990)
- My Kore! (Myこれ!) series
  - My Kore! Ction: Nitta Eri BEST (Myこれ!クション 新田恵利BEST) (2002)
  - My Kore! Ction: Nitta Eri BEST 2 (Myこれ!クション 新田恵利BEST 2) (2003)
  - My Kore! Choice 17: E-AREA + Singles Collection (Myこれ!チョイス 17 E-AREA + シングルコレクション) (2008)
  - My Kore! Lite: Nitta Eri (Myこれ!Lite 新田恵利) (2010)
- Nitta Eri SINGLES Complete (新田恵利 SINGLESコンプリート) (2007)

=== Other songs ===
- "Manatsu no Arbeit" (真夏のアルバイト) (duet with Junichi Mogi) (2005)
