= List of mental disorders in the DSM-5 and DSM-5-TR =

This is a list of mental disorders as defined in the DSM-5, the fifth edition of the Diagnostic and Statistical Manual of Mental Disorders, and their corresponding ICD-10-CM diagnostic codes. Published by the American Psychiatric Association, it was released in 2013, superseding the DSM-IV-TR. This list also includes updates featured in the text revision of the DSM-5, the DSM-5-TR, which was published in 2022, as well as updates made to the ICD-10-CM since the DSM-5-TR was published.

== Neurodevelopmental disorders ==
=== Intellectual disability ===
- F70 Mild intellectual developmental disorder (mild intellectual disability) (Note: Listed as mild intellectual disability (mild intellectual developmental disorder) in the DSM-5)
- F71 Moderate intellectual developmental disorder (moderate intellectual disability) (Note: Listed as moderate intellectual disability (moderate intellectual developmental disorder) in the DSM-5)
- F72 Severe intellectual developmental disorder (severe intellectual disability) (Note: Listed as severe intellectual disability (severe intellectual developmental disorder) in the DSM-5)
- F73 Profound intellectual developmental disorder (profound intellectual disability) (Note: Listed as profound intellectual disability (profound intellectual developmental disorder) in the DSM-5)
- F88 Global developmental delay
- F79 Unspecified intellectual developmental disorder (unspecified intellectual disability) (Note: Listed as unspecified intellectual disability (unspecified intellectual developmental disorder) in the DSM-5)

=== Communication disorders ===
- F80.9 Language disorder
- F80.0 Speech sound disorder
- F80.81 Childhood-onset fluency disorder (stuttering)
- F80.89 Social (pragmatic) communication disorder
- F80.9 Unspecified communication disorder

=== Autism spectrum disorder ===
- F84.0 Autism spectrum disorder

=== Attention-deficit/hyperactivity disorder ===
- F90.2 Attention-deficit/hyperactivity disorder, combined presentation
- F90.0 Attention-deficit/hyperactivity disorder, predominantly inattentive presentation
- F90.1 Attention-deficit/hyperactivity disorder, predominantly hyperactive/impulsive presentation
- F90.8 Other specified attention-deficit/hyperactivity disorder
- F90.9 Unspecified attention-deficit/hyperactivity disorder

=== Specific learning disorder ===
- F81.0 Specific learning disorder with impairment in reading
- F81.81 Specific learning disorder with impairment in written expression
- F81.2 Specific learning disorder with impairment in mathematics

=== Motor disorders ===
- F82 Developmental coordination disorder
- F98.4 Stereotypic movement disorder

==== Tic disorders ====
- F95.2 Tourette's disorder
- F95.1 Persistent (chronic) motor or vocal tic disorder
- F95.0 Provisional tic disorder
- F95.8 Other specified tic disorder
- F95.9 Unspecified tic disorder

=== Other neurodevelopmental disorders ===
- F88 Other specified neurodevelopmental disorder
- F89 Unspecified neurodevelopmental disorder

== Schizophrenia spectrum and other psychotic disorders ==
- F21 Schizotypal (personality) disorder
- F22 Delusional disorder
- F23 Brief psychotic disorder
- F20.81 Schizophreniform disorder
- F20.9 Schizophrenia
- F25.0 Schizoaffective disorder, bipolar type
- F25.1 Schizoaffective disorder, depressive type
- F06.2 Psychotic disorder due to another medical condition, with delusions
- F06.0 Psychotic disorder due to another medical condition, with hallucinations
- F06.1 Catatonia associated with another mental disorder
- F06.1 Catatonia due to another medical condition
- F06.1 Unspecified catatonia
- F28 Other specified schizophrenia spectrum and other psychotic disorder
- F29 Unspecified schizophrenia spectrum and other psychotic disorder

== Bipolar and related disorders ==
- F31.11 Bipolar I disorder, current or most recent episode manic, mild
- F31.12 Bipolar I disorder, current or most recent episode manic, moderate
- F31.13 Bipolar I disorder, current or most recent episode manic, severe
- F31.2 Bipolar I disorder, current or most recent episode manic, with psychotic features
- F31.73 Bipolar I disorder, current or most recent episode manic, in partial remission
- F31.74 Bipolar I disorder, current or most recent episode manic, in full remission
- F31.9 Bipolar I disorder, current or most recent episode manic, unspecified
- F31.0 Bipolar I disorder, current or most recent episode hypomanic
  - F31.73 Bipolar I disorder, current or most recent episode hypomanic, in partial remission
  - F31.74 Bipolar I disorder, current or most recent episode hypomanic, in full remission
  - F31.9 Bipolar I disorder, current or most recent episode hypomanic, unspecified
- F31.31 Bipolar I disorder, current or most recent episode depressed, mild
- F31.32 Bipolar I disorder, current or most recent episode depressed, moderate
- F31.4 Bipolar I disorder, current or most recent episode depressed, severe
- F31.5 Bipolar I disorder, current or most recent episode depressed, with psychotic features
- F31.75 Bipolar I disorder, current or most recent episode depressed, in partial remission
- F31.76 Bipolar I disorder, current or most recent episode depressed, in full remission
- F31.9 Bipolar I disorder, current or most recent episode depressed, unspecified
- F31.9 Bipolar I disorder, current or most recent episode unspecified
- F31.81 Bipolar II disorder
- F34.0 Cyclothymic disorder
- F06.33 Bipolar and related disorder due to another medical condition, with manic features
- F06.33 Bipolar and related disorder due to another medical condition, with manic- or hypomanic-like episode
- F06.34 Bipolar and related disorder due to another medical condition, with mixed features
- F31.89 Other specified bipolar and related disorder
- F31.9 Unspecified bipolar and related disorder

== Depressive disorders ==
- F34.8 Disruptive mood dysregulation disorder
- F32.0 Major depressive disorder, single episode, mild
- F32.1 Major depressive disorder, single episode, moderate
- F32.2 Major depressive disorder, single episode, severe
- F32.3 Major depressive disorder, single episode, with psychotic features
- F32.4 Major depressive disorder, single episode, in partial remission
- F32.5 Major depressive disorder, single episode, in full remission
- F32.9 Major depressive disorder, single episode, unspecified
- F33.0 Major depressive disorder, recurrent episode, mild
- F33.1 Major depressive disorder, recurrent episode, moderate
- F33.2 Major depressive disorder, recurrent episode, severe
- F33.3 Major depressive disorder, recurrent episode, with psychotic features
- F33.41 Major depressive disorder, recurrent episode, in partial remission
- F33.42 Major depressive disorder, recurrent episode, in full remission
- F33.9 Major depressive disorder, recurrent episode, unspecified
- F34.1 Persistent depressive disorder (dysthymia)
- N94.3 Premenstrual dysphoric disorder
- F06.31 Depressive disorder due to another medical condition with depressive features
- F06.32 Depressive disorder due to another medical condition with major depressive-like episode
- F06.34 Depressive disorder due to another medical condition with mixed features
- F32.8 Other specified depressive disorder
- F32.9 Unspecified depressive disorder
- F39 Unspecified mood disorder (Note: Only in the DSM-5-TR)

== Anxiety disorders ==
- F93.0 Separation anxiety disorder
- F94.0 Selective mutism
- F40.218 Specific phobia, animal
- F40.228 Specific phobia, natural environment
- F40.230 Specific phobia, blood
- F40.231 Specific phobia, injections and transfusions
- F40.232 Specific phobia, other medical care
- F40.233 Specific phobia, injury
- F40.248 Specific phobia, situational
- F40.298 Specific phobia, other
- F40.10 Social anxiety disorder (social phobia)
- F41.0 Panic disorder
- F40.00 Agoraphobia
- F41.1 Generalized anxiety disorder
- F06.4 Anxiety disorder due to another medical condition
- F41.8 Other specified anxiety disorder
- F41.9 Unspecified anxiety disorder

== Obsessive-compulsive and related disorders ==
- F42 Obsessive-compulsive disorder
- F45.22 Body dysmorphic disorder
- F42 Hoarding disorder
- F63.2 Trichotillomania (hair-pulling disorder)
- L98.1 Excoriation (skin-picking) disorder
- F06.8 Obsessive-compulsive and related disorder due to another medical condition
- F42 Other specified obsessive-compulsive and related disorder
- F42 Unspecified obsessive-compulsive and related disorder

== Trauma- and stressor-related disorders ==
- F94.1 Reactive attachment disorder
- F94.2 Disinhibited social engagement disorder
- F43.10 Posttraumatic stress disorder
- F43.0 Acute stress disorder
- F43.21 Adjustment disorder, with depressed mood
- F43.22 Adjustment disorder, with anxiety
- F43.23 Adjustment disorder, with mixed anxiety and depressed mood
- F43.24 Adjustment disorder, with disturbance of conduct
- F43.25 Adjustment disorder, with mixed disturbance of emotions and conduct
- F43.20 Adjustment disorder, unspecified
- F43.81 Prolonged grief disorder (Note: Formerly coded as F43.8)
- F43.89 Other specified trauma- and stressor-related disorder
- F43.9 Unspecified trauma- and stressor-related disorder

== Dissociative disorders ==
- F44.81 Dissociative identity disorder
- F44.0 Dissociative amnesia
  - F44.1 Dissociative amnesia with dissociative fugue
- F48.1 Depersonalization/derealization disorder
- F44.89 Other specified dissociative disorder
- F44.9 Unspecified dissociative disorder

== Somatic symptom and related disorders ==
- F45.1 Somatic symptom disorder
- F45.21 Illness anxiety disorder
- F44.4 Conversion disorder (functional neurological symptom disorder) with weakness or paralysis
- F44.4 Conversion disorder (functional neurological symptom disorder) with abnormal movement
- F44.4 Conversion disorder (functional neurological symptom disorder) with swallowing symptoms
- F44.4 Conversion disorder (functional neurological symptom disorder) with speech symptom
- F44.5 Conversion disorder (functional neurological symptom disorder) with attacks or seizures
- F44.6 Conversion disorder (functional neurological symptom disorder) with anesthesia or sensory loss
- F44.7 Conversion disorder (functional neurological symptom disorder) with mixed symptoms
- F54 Psychological factors affecting other medical conditions
- F68.10 Factitious disorder
- F45.8 Other specified somatic symptom and related disorder
- F45.9 Unspecified somatic symptom and related disorder

== Feeding and eating disorders ==
- F98.3 Pica, in children
- F50.83 Pica, in adults (Note: Formerly coded as F50.8 and F50.89)
- F98.21 Rumination disorder in infants, children, and adolescents (Note: Code formerly applied to all ages)
- F50.84 Rumination disorder in adults
- F50.8 Avoidant/restrictive food intake disorder
- F50.01 Anorexia nervosa, restricting type (Note: Code no longer used as of 1 October 2024)
  - F50.010 Anorexia nervosa, restricting type, mild
  - F50.011 Anorexia nervosa, restricting type, moderate
  - F50.012 Anorexia nervosa, restricting type, severe
  - F50.013 Anorexia nervosa, restricting type, extreme
  - F50.014 Anorexia nervosa, restricting type, in partial remission
  - F50.014 Anorexia nervosa, restricting type, in full remission
  - F50.019 Anorexia nervosa, restricting type, unspecified
- F50.02 Anorexia nervosa, binge-eating/purging type
  - F50.020 Anorexia nervosa, binge-eating/purging type, mild
  - F50.021 Anorexia nervosa, binge-eating/purging type, moderate
  - F50.022 Anorexia nervosa, binge-eating/purging type, severe
  - F50.023 Anorexia nervosa, binge-eating/purging type, extreme
  - F50.024 Anorexia nervosa, binge-eating/purging type, in partial remission
  - F50.024 Anorexia nervosa, binge-eating/purging type, in full remission
  - F50.029 Anorexia nervosa, binge-eating/purging type, unspecified
- F50.2 Bulimia nervosa
  - F50.20 Bulimia nervosa, unspecified
  - F50.21 Bulimia nervosa, mild
  - F50.22 Bulimia nervosa, moderate
  - F50.23 Bulimia nervosa, severe
  - F50.24 Bulimia nervosa, extreme
  - F50.25 Bulimia nervosa, in partial remission
  - F50.25 Bulimia nervosa, in full remission
- F50.81 Binge-eating disorder (Note: Formerly coded as F50.8)
  - F50.810 Binge-eating disorder, mild
  - F50.811 Binge-eating disorder, moderate
  - F50.812 Binge-eating disorder, severe
  - F50.813 Binge-eating disorder, extreme
  - F50.814 Binge-eating disorder, in partial remission
  - F50.814 Binge-eating disorder, in partial remission
  - F50.819 Binge-eating disorder, unspecified
- F50.8 Other specified feeding and eating disorder
- F50.9 Unspecified feeding and eating disorder

== Elimination disorders ==
- F98.0 Enuresis
- F98.1 Encopresis
- N39.498 Other specified elimination disorder with urinary symptoms
- R15.9 Other specified elimination disorder with fecal symptoms
- R32 Unspecified elimination disorder with urinary symptoms
- R15.9 Unspecified elimination disorder with fecal symptoms

== Sleep-wake disorders ==
- G47.00 Insomnia disorder
- G47.10 Hypersomnolence disorder
- G47.419 Narcolepsy without cataplexy but with hypocretin deficiency
- G47.411 Narcolepsy with cataplexy but without hypocretin deficiency
- G47.419 Autosomal dominant cerebellar ataxia, deafness, and narcolepsy
- G47.419 Autosomal dominant narcolepsy, obesity, and type 2 diabetes
- G47.429 Narcolepsy secondary to another medical condition

=== Breathing-related sleep disorders ===
- G47.33 Obstructive sleep apnea hypopnea
- G47.31 Idiopathic central sleep apnea
- R06.3 Cheyne-Stokes breathing
- G47.37 Central sleep apnea comorbid with opioid use
- G47.34 Idiopathic sleep-related hypoventilation
- G47.35 Congenital central alveolar hypoventilation
- G47.36 Comorbid sleep-related hypoventilation
- G47.21 Circadian rhythm sleep-wake disorder, delayed sleep phase type
- G47.22 Circadian rhythm sleep-wake disorder, advanced sleep phase type
- G47.23 Circadian rhythm sleep-wake disorder, irregular sleep-wake type
- G47.24 Circadian rhythm sleep-wake disorder, non-24-hour sleep-wake type
- G47.26 Circadian rhythm sleep-wake disorder, shift work type
- G47.20 Circadian rhythm sleep-wake disorder, unspecified type

=== Parasomnias ===
- F51.3 Non-rapid eye movement sleep arousal disorder, sleepwalking type
- F51.4 Non-rapid eye movement sleep arousal disorder, sleep terror type
- F51.5 Nightmare disorder
- G47.52 Rapid eye movement sleep behavior disorder
- G25.81 Restless legs syndrome
- G47.09 Other specified insomnia disorder
- G47.00 Unspecified insomnia disorder
- G47.19 Other specified hypersomnolence disorder
- G47.10 Unspecified hypersomnolence disorder
- G47.8 Other specified sleep-wake disorder
- G47.9 Unspecified sleep-wake disorder

== Sexual dysfunctions ==
- F52.32 Delayed ejaculation
- F52.21 Erectile disorder
- F52.31 Female orgasmic disorder
- F52.22 Female sexual interest/arousal disorder
- F52.6 Genito-pelvic pain/penetration disorder
- F52.0 Male hypoactive sexual desire disorder
- F52.4 Premature (early) ejaculation
- F52.8 Other specified sexual dysfunction
- F52.9 Unspecified sexual dysfunction

== Gender dysphoria ==
- F64.2 Gender dysphoria in children
- F64.1 Gender dysphoria in adolescents and adults
- F64.8 Other specified gender dysphoria
- F64.9 Unspecified gender dysphoria

== Disruptive, impulse-control, and conduct disorders ==
- F91.3 Oppositional defiant disorder
- F63.81 Intermittent explosive disorder
- F91.1 Conduct disorder, childhood-onset type
- F91.2 Conduct disorder, adolescent-onset type
- F91.9 Conduct disorder, unspecified onset
- F60.2 Antisocial personality disorder
- F63.1 Pyromania
- F63.3 Kleptomania
- F91.8 Other specified disruptive, impulse-control, and conduct disorder
- F91.9 Unspecified disruptive, impulse-control, and conduct disorder

== Substance-related and addictive disorders ==
=== Substance-related disorders ===
==== Alcohol-related disorders ====
- F10.10 Alcohol use disorder, mild
- F10.20 Alcohol use disorder, moderate
- F10.20 Alcohol use disorder, severe
- F10.129 Alcohol intoxication with mild use disorder
- F10.229 Alcohol intoxication with moderate or severe use disorder
- F10.929 Alcohol intoxication without use disorder
- F10.239 Alcohol withdrawal without perceptual disturbances
- F10.232 Alcohol withdrawal with perceptual disturbances
- F10.159 Alcohol-induced psychotic disorder, with mild use disorder
- F10.259 Alcohol-induced psychotic disorder, with moderate or severe use disorder
- F10.929 Alcohol-induced psychotic disorder, without use disorder
- F10.14 Alcohol-induced bipolar and related disorder, with mild use disorder
- F10.24 Alcohol-induced bipolar and related disorder, with moderate or severe use disorder
- F10.94 Alcohol-induced bipolar and related disorder, without use disorder
- F10.14 Alcohol-induced depressive disorder, with mild use disorder
- F10.24 Alcohol-induced depressive disorder, with moderate or severe use disorder
- F10.94 Alcohol-induced depressive disorder, without use disorder
- F10.180 Alcohol-induced anxiety disorder, with mild use disorder
- F10.280 Alcohol-induced anxiety disorder, with moderate or severe use disorder
- F10.980 Alcohol-induced anxiety disorder, without use disorder
- F10.182 Alcohol-induced sleep disorder, with mild use disorder
- F10.282 Alcohol-induced sleep disorder, with moderate or severe use disorder
- F10.982 Alcohol-induced sleep disorder, without use disorder
- F10.181 Alcohol-induced sexual dysfunction, with mild use disorder
- F10.281 Alcohol-induced sexual dysfunction, with moderate or severe use disorder
- F10.921 Alcohol-induced sexual dysfunction, without use disorder
- F10.121 Alcohol intoxication delirium, with mild use disorder
- F10.221 Alcohol intoxication delirium, with moderate or severe use disorder
- F10.921 Alcohol intoxication delirium, without use disorder
- F10.131 Alcohol withdrawal delirium, with mild use disorder
- F10.231 Alcohol withdrawal delirium, with moderate or severe use disorder
- F10.931 Alcohol withdrawal delirium, without use disorder
- F10.26 Alcohol-induced major neurocognitive disorder, amnestic-confabulatory type, with moderate or severe use disorder
- F10.96 Alcohol-induced major neurocognitive disorder, amnestic-confabulatory type, without use disorder
- F10.27 Alcohol-induced major neurocognitive disorder, nonamnestic-confabultatory type, with moderate or severe use disorder
- F10.97 Alcohol-induced major neurocognitive disorder, nonamnestic-confabulatory type, without use disorder
- F10.188 Alcohol-induced mild neurocognitive disorder, with mild use disorder
- F10.288 Alcohol-induced mild neurocognitive disorder, with moderate or severe use disorder
- F10.988 Alcohol-induced mild neurocognitive disorder, without use disorder
- F10.99 Unspecified alcohol-related disorder

==== Caffeine-related disorders ====
- F15.929 Caffeine intoxication
- F15.93 Caffeine withdrawal
- F15.980 Caffeine-induced anxiety disorder
- F15.982 Caffeine-induced sleep disorder
- F15.99 Unspecified caffeine-related disorder

==== Cannabis-related disorders ====
- F12.10 Cannabis use disorder, mild
  - F12.11 Cannabis use disorder, mild, in early remission
  - F12.11 Cannabis use disorder, mild, in sustained remission
- F12.20 Cannabis use disorder, moderate
  - F12.21 Cannabis use disorder, moderate, in early remission
  - F12.21 Cannabis use disorder, moderate, in sustained remission
- F12.20 Cannabis use disorder, severe
  - F12.21 Cannabis use disorder, severe, in early remission
  - F12.21 Cannabis use disorder, severe, in sustained remission
- F12.129 Cannabis intoxication, without perceptual disturbances, with mild use disorder
- F12.229 Cannabis intoxication, without perceptual disturbances, with moderate or severe use disorder
- F12.929 Cannabis intoxication, without perceptual disturbances, without use disorder
- F12.122 Cannabis intoxication, with perceptual disturbances, with mild use disorder
- F12.222 Cannabis intoxication, with perceptual disturbances, with moderate or severe use disorder
- F12.922 Cannabis intoxication, with perceptual disturbances, without use disorder
- F12.288 Cannabis withdrawal (Note: Not coded in the DSM-5-TR)
  - F12.159 Cannabis withdrawal, with mild use disorder
  - F12.259 Cannabis withdrawal, with moderate or severe use disorder
  - F12.959 Cannabis withdrawal, without use disorder
- F12.180 Cannabis-induced anxiety disorder, with mild use disorder
- F12.280 Cannabis-induced anxiety disorder, with moderate or severe use disorder
- F12.980 Cannabis-induced anxiety disorder, no use disorder
- F12.188 Cannabis-induced sleep disorder, with mild use disorder
- F12.288 Cannabis-induced sleep disorder, with moderate or severe use disorder
- F12.988 Cannabis-induced sleep disorder, without use disorder
- F12.121 Cannabis intoxication delirium, with mild use disorder
- F12.221 Cannabis intoxication delirium, with moderate or severe use disorder
- F12.921 Cannabis intoxication delirium, without use disorder
- F12.921 Pharmaceutical cannabis receptor agonist-induced delirium
- F12.99 Unspecified cannabis-related disorder

==== Hallucinogen-related disorders ====
- F16.10 Phencyclidine use disorder, mild
  - F16.11 Phencyclidine use disorder, mild, in early remission
  - F16.11 Phencyclidine use disorder, mild, in sustained remission
- F16.20 Phencyclidine use disorder, moderate
  - F16.21 Phencyclidine use disorder, moderate, in early remission
  - F16.21 Phencyclidine use disorder, moderate, in sustained remission
- F16.20 Phencyclidine use disorder, severe
  - F16.21 Phencyclidine use disorder, severe, in early remission
  - F16.21 Phencyclidine use disorder, severe, in sustained remission
- F16.10 Other hallucinogen use disorder, mild
  - F16.11 Other hallucinogen use disorder, mild, in early remission
  - F16.11 Other hallucinogen use disorder, mild, in sustained remission
- F16.20 Other hallucinogen use disorder, moderate
  - F16.21 Other hallucinogen use disorder, moderate, in early remission
  - F16.21 Other hallucinogen use disorder, moderate, in sustained remission
- F16.20 Other hallucinogen use disorder, severe
  - F16.21 Other hallucinogen use disorder, severe, in early remission
  - F16.21 Other hallucinogen use disorder, severe, in sustained remission
- F16.129 Phencyclidine intoxication, with mild use disorder
- F16.229 Phencyclidine intoxication, with moderate or severe use disorder
- F16.929 Phencyclidine intoxication, without use disorder
- F16.129 Other hallucinogen intoxication, with mild use disorder
- F16.229 Other hallucinogen intoxication, with moderate or severe use disorder
- F16.929 Other hallucinogen intoxication, without use disorder
- F16.983 Hallucinogen persisting perception disorder
- F16.159 Phencyclidine-induced psychotic disorder, with mild use disorder
- F16.259 Phencyclidine-induced psychotic disorder, with moderate or severe use disorder
- F16.959 Phencyclidine-induced psychotic disorder, without use disorder
- F16.14 Phencyclidine-induced bipolar and related disorder, with mild use disorder
- F16.24 Phencyclidine-induced bipolar and related disorder, with moderate or severe use disorder
- F16.94 Phencyclidine-induced bipolar and related disorder, without use disorder
- F16.14 Phencyclidine-induced depressive disorder, with mild use disorder
- F16.24 Phencyclidine-induced depressive disorder, with moderate or severe use disorder
- F16.94 Phencyclidine-induced depressive disorder, without use disorder
- F16.180 Phencyclidine-induced anxiety disorder, with mild use disorder
- F16.280 Phencyclidine-induced anxiety disorder, with moderate or severe use disorder
- F16.980 Phencyclidine-induced anxiety disorder, without use disorder
- F16.121 Phencyclidine intoxication delirium, with mild use disorder
- F16.221 Phencyclidine intoxication delirium, with moderate or severe use disorder
- F16.921 Phencyclidine intoxication delirium, without use disorder
- F16.159 Other hallucinogen-induced psychotic disorder, with mild use disorder
- F16.259 Other hallucinogen-induced psychotic disorder, with moderate or severe use disorder
- F16.959 Other hallucinogen-induced psychotic disorder, without use disorder
- F16.14 Other hallucinogen-induced bipolar and related disorder, with mild use disorder
- F16.24 Other hallucinogen-induced bipolar and related disorder, with moderate or severe use disorder
- F16.94 Other hallucinogen-induced bipolar and related disorder, without use disorder
- F16.14 Other hallucinogen-induced depressive disorder, with mild use disorder
- F16.24 Other hallucinogen-induced depressive disorder, with moderate or severe use disorder
- F16.94 Other hallucinogen-induced depressive disorder, without use disorder
- F16.180 Other hallucinogen-induced anxiety disorder, with mild use disorder
- F16.280 Other hallucinogen-induced anxiety disorder, with moderate or severe use disorder
- F16.980 Other hallucinogen-induced anxiety disorder, without use disorder
- F16.121 Other hallucinogen intoxication delirium, with mild use disorder
- F16.221 Other hallucinogen intoxication delirium, with moderate or severe use disorder
- F16.921 Other hallucinogen intoxication delirium, without use disorder
- F16.921 Ketamine or other hallucinogen-induced delirium (Note: When ketamine or other hallucinogen is taken as prescribed)
- F16.99 Unspecified phencyclidine-related disorder
- F16.99 Unspecified hallucinogen-related disorder

==== Inhalant-related disorders ====
- F18.10 Inhalant use disorder, mild
  - F18.11 Inhalant use disorder, mild, in early remission
  - F18.11 Inhalant use disorder, mild, in sustained remission
- F18.20 Inhalant use disorder, moderate
  - F18.21 Inhalant use disorder, moderate, in early remission
  - F18.21 Inhalant use disorder, moderate, in sustained remission
- F18.20 Inhalant use disorder, severe
  - F18.21 Inhalant use disorder, severe, in early remission
  - F18.21 Inhalant use disorder, severe, in sustained remission
- F18.129 Inhalant intoxication, with use disorder, mild
- F18.229 Inhalant intoxication, with use disorder, moderate or severe
- F18.929 Inhalant intoxication, without use disorder
- F18.159 Inhalant-induced psychotic disorder, with mild use disorder
- F18.259 Inhalant-induced psychotic disorder, with moderate or severe use disorder
- F18.959 Inhalant-induced psychotic disorder, without use disorder
- F18.14 Inhalant-induced depressive disorder, with mild use disorder
- F18.24 Inhalant-induced depressive disorder, with moderate or severe use disorder
- F18.94 Inhalant-induced depressive disorder, without use disorder
- F18.180 Inhalant-induced anxiety disorder, with mild use disorder
- F18.280 Inhalant-induced anxiety disorder, with moderate or severe use disorder
- F18.980 Inhalant-induced anxiety disorder, without use disorder
- F18.121 Inhalant intoxication delirium, with mild use disorder
- F18.221 Inhalant intoxication delirium, with moderate or severe use disorder
- F18.921 Inhalant intoxication delirium, without use disorder
- F18.17 Inhalant-induced major neurocognitive disorder, with mild use disorder
- F18.27 Inhalant-induced major neurocognitive disorder, with moderate or severe use disorder
- F18.97 Inhalant-induced major neurocognitive disorder, without use disorder
- F18.188 Inhalant-induced mild neurocognitive disorder, with mild use disorder
- F18.288 Inhalant-induced mild neurocognitive disorder, with moderate or severe use disorder
- F18.988 Inhalant-induced mild neurocognitive disorder, without use disorder
- F18.99 Unspecified inhalant-related disorder

==== Opioid-related disorders ====
- F11.10 Opioid use disorder, mild
  - F11.11 Opioid use disorder, mild, in early remission
  - F11.11 Opioid use disorder, mild, in sustained remission
- F11.20 Opioid use disorder, moderate
  - F11.21 Opioid use disorder, moderate, in early remission
  - F11.21 Opioid use disorder, moderate, in sustained remission
- F11.20 Opioid use disorder, severe
  - F11.21 Opioid use disorder, severe, in early remission
  - F11.21 Opioid use disorder, severe, in sustained remission
- F11.129 Opioid intoxication, without perceptual disturbances, with mild use disorder
- F11.229 Opioid intoxication, without perceptual disturbances, with moderate or severe use disorder
- F11.929 Opioid intoxication, without perceptual disturbances, without use disorder
- F11.122 Opioid intoxication, with perceptual disturbances, with mild use disorder
- F11.222 Opioid intoxication, with perceptual disturbances, with moderate or severe use disorder
- F11.922 Opioid intoxication, with perceptual disturbances, without use disorder
- F11.23 Opioid withdrawal
- F11.14 Opioid-induced depressive disorder, with mild use disorder
- F11.24 Opioid-induced depressive disorder, with moderate or severe use disorder
- F11.94 Opioid-induced depressive disorder, without use disorder
- F11.188 Opioid-induced anxiety disorder, with mild use disorder (Note: Formerly coded as F11.180)
- F11.288 Opioid-induced anxiety disorder, with moderate or severe use disorder (Note: Formerly coded as F11.280)
- F11.988 Opioid-induced anxiety disorder, without use disorder (Note: Formerly coded as F11.980)
- F11.182 Opioid-induced sleep disorder, with mild use disorder
- F11.282 Opioid-induced sleep disorder, with moderate or severe use disorder
- F12.982 Opioid-induced sleep disorder, without use disorder
- F11.181 Opioid-induced sexual dysfunction, with mild use disorder
- F11.281 Opioid-induced sexual dysfunction, with moderate or severe use disorder
- F11.921 Opioid-induced sexual dysfunction, without use disorder
- F11.121 Opioid intoxication delirium, with mild use disorder
- F11.221 Opioid intoxication delirium, with moderate or severe use disorder
- F11.921 Opioid intoxication delirium, without use disorder
- F11.188 Opioid withdrawal delirium, with mild use disorder
- F11.288 Opioid withdrawal delirium, with moderate or severe use disorder
- F11.988 Opioid withdrawal delirium, without use disorder
- F11.921 Opioid-induced delirium when opioid medication taken as prescribed
- F11.988 Opioid-induced delirium during withdrawal from opioid medication taken as prescribed
- F11.99 Unspecified opioid-related disorder

==== Sedative-, hypnotic-, or anxiolytic-related disorders ====
- F13.10 Sedative, hypnotic, or anxiolytic use disorder, mild
  - F13.11 Sedative, hypnotic, or anxiolytic use disorder, mild, in early remission
  - F13.11 Sedative, hypnotic, or anxiolytic use disorder, mild, in sustained remission
- F13.20 Sedative, hypnotic, or anxiolytic use disorder, moderate
  - F13.21 Sedative, hypnotic, or anxiolytic use disorder, moderate, in early remission
  - F13.21 Sedative, hypnotic, or anxiolytic use disorder, moderate, in sustained remission
- F13.20 Sedative, hypnotic, or anxiolytic use disorder, severe
  - F13.21 Sedative, hypnotic, or anxiolytic use disorder, severe, in early remission
  - F13.21 Sedative, hypnotic, or anxiolytic use disorder, severe, in sustained remission
- F13.129 Sedative, hypnotic, or anxiolytic intoxication, with mild use disorder
- F13.229 Sedative, hypnotic, or anxiolytic intoxication, with moderate or severe use disorder
- F13.929 Sedative, hypnotic, or anxiolytic intoxication, without use disorder
- F13.239 Sedative, hypnotic, or anxiolytic intoxication, without perceptual disturbances (Note: Only in the DSM-5)
- F13.232 Sedative, hypnotic, or anxiolytic intoxication, with perceptual disturbances
- F13.130 Sedative, hypnotic, or anxiolytic withdrawal, without perceptual disturbances, with mild use disorder
- F13.230 Sedative, hypnotic, or anxiolytic withdrawal, without perceptual disturbances, with moderate or severe use disorder
- F13.930 Sedative, hypnotic, or anxiolytic withdrawal, without perceptual disturbances, without use disorder
- F13.132 Sedative, hypnotic, or anxiolytic withdrawal, with perceptual disturbances, with mild use disorder
- F13.232 Sedative, hypnotic, or anxiolytic withdrawal, with perceptual disturbances, with moderate or severe use disorder
- F13.932 Sedative, hypnotic, or anxiolytic withdrawal, with perceptual disturbances, without use disorder
- F13.159 Sedative-, hypnotic-, or anxiolytic-induced psychotic disorder, with mild use disorder
- F13.259 Sedative-, hypnotic-, or anxiolytic-induced psychotic disorder, with moderate or severe use disorder
- F13.959 Sedative-, hypnotic-, or anxiolytic-induced psychotic disorder, without use disorder
- F13.14 Sedative-, hypnotic-, or anxiolytic-induced bipolar and related disorder, with mild use disorder
- F13.24 Sedative-, hypnotic-, or anxiolytic-induced bipolar and related disorder, with moderate or severe use disorder
- F13.94 Sedative-, hypnotic-, or anxiolytic-induced bipolar and related disorder, without use disorder
- F13.14 Sedative-, hypnotic-, or anxiolytic-induced depressive disorder, with mild use disorder
- F13.24 Sedative-, hypnotic-, or anxiolytic-induced depressive disorder, with moderate or severe use disorder
- F13.94 Sedative-, hypnotic-, or anxiolytic-induced depressive disorder, without use disorder
- F13.180 Sedative-, hypnotic-, or anxiolytic-induced anxiety disorder, with mild use disorder
- F13.280 Sedative-, hypnotic-, or anxiolytic-induced anxiety disorder, with moderate or severe use disorder
- F13.980 Sedative-, hypnotic-, or anxiolytic-induced anxiety disorder, without use disorder
- F13.182 Sedative-, hypnotic-, or anxiolytic-induced sleep disorder, with mild use disorder
- F13.282 Sedative-, hypnotic-, or anxiolytic-induced sleep disorder, with moderate or severe use disorder
- F13.982 Sedative-, hypnotic-, or anxiolytic-induced sleep disorder, without use disorder
- F13.181 Sedative-, hypnotic-, or anxiolytic-induced sexual dysfunction, with mild use disorder
- F13.281 Sedative-, hypnotic-, or anxiolytic-induced sexual dysfunction, with moderate or severe use disorder
- F13.921 Sedative-, hypnotic-, or anxiolytic-induced sexual dysfunction, without use disorder
- F13.121 Sedative-, hypnotic-, or anxiolytic intoxication delirium, with mild use disorder
- F13.221 Sedative-, hypnotic-, or anxiolytic intoxication delirium, with moderate or severe use disorder
- F13.921 Sedative-, hypnotic-, or anxiolytic intoxication delirium, without use disorder
- F13.131 Sedative-, hypnotic-, or anxiolytic withdrawal delirium, with mild use disorder
- F13.231 Sedative-, hypnotic-, or anxiolytic withdrawal delirium, with moderate or severe use disorder
- F13.931 Sedative-, hypnotic-, or anxiolytic withdrawal delirium, without use disorder
- F13.921 Sedative-, hypnotic-, or anxiolytic-induced delirium when sedative, hypnotic, or anxiolytic medication taken as prescribed
- F13.931 Sedative-, hypnotic-, or anxiolytic-induced delirium during withdrawal from sedative, hypnotic, or anxiolytic medication taken as prescribed
- F13.27 Sedative-, hypnotic-, or anxiolytic-induced major neurocognitive disorder with moderate or severe use disorder
- F13.97 Sedative-, hypnotic-, or anxiolytic-induced major neurocognitive disorder without use disorder
- F13.188 Sedative-, hypnotic-, or anxiolytic-induced mild neurocognitive disorder with mild use disorder
- F13.288 Sedative-, hypnotic-, or anxiolytic-induced mild neurocognitive disorder with moderate or severe use disorder
- F13.988 Sedative-, hypnotic-, or anxiolytic-induced mild neurocognitive disorder without use disorder
- F13.99 Unspecified sedative-, hypnotic-, or anxiolytic-related disorder

==== Stimulant-related disorders ====
- F15.10 Stimulant use disorder, mild, amphetamine-type substance
  - F15.11 Stimulant use disorder, mild, in early remission, amphetamine-type substance
  - F15.11 Stimulant use disorder, mild, in sustained remission, amphetamine-type substance
- F14.10 Stimulant use disorder, mild, cocaine
  - F14.11 Stimulant use disorder, mild, in early remission, cocaine
  - F14.11 Stimulant use disorder, mild, in sustained remission, cocaine
- F15.10 Stimulant use disorder, mild, other or unspecified stimulant
  - F15.11 Stimulant use disorder, mild, in early remission, other or unspecified stimulant
  - F15.11 Stimulant use disorder, mild, in sustained remission, other or unspecified stimulant
- F15.20 Stimulant use disorder, moderate, amphetamine-type substance
  - F15.21 Stimulant use disorder, moderate, in early remission, amphetamine-type substance
  - F15.21 Stimulant use disorder, moderate, in sustained remission, amphetamine-type substance
- F14.20 Stimulant use disorder, moderate, cocaine
  - F14.21 Stimulant use disorder, moderate, in early remission, cocaine
  - F14.21 Stimulant use disorder, moderate, in sustained remission, cocaine
- F15.20 Stimulant use disorder, moderate, other or unspecified stimulant
  - F15.21 Stimulant use disorder, moderate, in early remission, other or unspecified stimulant
  - F15.21 Stimulant use disorder, moderate, in sustained remission, other or unspecified stimulant
- F15.20 Stimulant use disorder, severe, amphetamine-type substance
  - F15.21 Stimulant use disorder, severe, in early remission, amphetamine-type substance
  - F15.21 Stimulant use disorder, severe, in sustained remission, amphetamine-type substance
- F14.20 Stimulant use disorder, severe, cocaine
  - F14.21 Stimulant use disorder, severe, in early remission, cocaine
  - F14.21 Stimulant use disorder, severe, in sustained remission, cocaine
- F15.20 Stimulant use disorder, severe, other or unspecified stimulant
  - F15.21 Stimulant use disorder, severe, in early remission, other or unspecified stimulant
  - F15.21 Stimulant use disorder, severe, in sustained remission, other or unspecified stimulant
- F15.129 Stimulant intoxication, amphetamine or other stimulant, without perceptual disturbances, with mild use disorder
- F15.229 Stimulant intoxication, amphetamine or other stimulant, without perceptual disturbances, with moderate or severe use disorder
- F15.929 Stimulant intoxication, amphetamine or other stimulant, without perceptual disturbances, without use disorder
- F14.129 Stimulant intoxication, cocaine, without perceptual disturbances, with mild use disorder
- F14.229 Stimulant intoxication, cocaine, without perceptual disturbances, with moderate or severe use disorder
- F14.929 Stimulant intoxication, cocaine, without perceptual disturbances, without use disorder
- F15.122 Stimulant intoxication, amphetamine or other stimulant, with perceptual disturbances, with mild use disorder
- F15.222 Stimulant intoxication, amphetamine or other stimulant, with perceptual disturbances, with moderate or severe use disorder
- F15.922 Stimulant intoxication, amphetamine or other stimulant, with perceptual disturbances, without use disorder
- F14.122 Stimulant intoxication, cocaine, with perceptual disturbances, with mild use disorder
- F14.222 Stimulant intoxication, cocaine, with perceptual disturbances, with moderate or severe use disorder
- F14.922 Stimulant intoxication, cocaine, with perceptual disturbances, without use disorder
- F15.23 Stimulant withdrawal, amphetamine or other stimulant
  - F15.13 Stimulant withdrawal, amphetamine or other stimulant, with mild use disorder
  - F15.23 Stimulant withdrawal, amphetamine or other stimulant, with moderate or severe use disorder
  - F15.93 Stimulant withdrawal, amphetamine or other stimulant, no use disorder
- F14.23 Stimulant withdrawal, cocaine
  - F14.13 Stimulant withdrawal, cocaine, with mild use disorder
  - F14.23 Stimulant withdrawal, cocaine, with moderate or severe use disorder
  - F14.93 Stimulant withdrawal, cocaine, without use disorder
- F15.159 Amphetamine-type substance (or other stimulant)-induced psychotic disorder, with mild use disorder
- F15.259 Amphetamine-type substance (or other stimulant)-induced psychotic disorder, with moderate or severe use disorder
- F15.959 Amphetamine-type substance (or other stimulant)-induced psychotic disorder, without use disorder
- F14.159 Cocaine-induced psychotic disorder, with mild use disorder
- F14.259 Cocaine-induced psychotic disorder, with moderate or severe use disorder
- F14.959 Cocaine-induced psychotic disorder, without use disorder
- F15.14 Amphetamine-type substance (or other stimulant)-induced bipolar and related disorder, with mild use disorder
- F15.24 Amphetamine-type substance (or other stimulant)-induced bipolar and related disorder, with moderate or severe use disorder
- F15.94 Amphetamine-type substance (or other stimulant)-induced bipolar and related disorder, without use disorder
- F14.14 Cocaine-induced bipolar and related disorder, with mild use disorder
- F14.24 Cocaine-induced bipolar and related disorder, with moderate or severe use disorder
- F14.94 Cocaine-induced bipolar and related disorder, without use disorder
- F15.14 Amphetamine-type substance (or other stimulant)-induced depressive disorder, with mild use disorder
- F15.24 Amphetamine-type substance (or other stimulant)-induced depressive disorder, with moderate or severe use disorder
- F15.94 Amphetamine-type substance (or other stimulant)-induced depressive disorder, without use disorder
- F14.14 Cocaine-induced depressive disorder, with mild use disorder
- F14.24 Cocaine-induced depressive disorder, with moderate or severe use disorder
- F14.94 Cocaine-induced depressive disorder, without use disorder
- F15.180 Amphetamine-type substance (or other stimulant)-induced anxiety disorder, with mild use disorder
- F15.280 Amphetamine-type substance (or other stimulant)-induced anxiety disorder, with moderate or severe use disorder
- F15.980 Amphetamine-type substance (or other stimulant)-induced anxiety disorder, without use disorder
- F14.180 Cocaine-induced anxiety disorder, with mild use disorder
- F14.280 Cocaine-induced anxiety disorder, with moderate or severe use disorder
- F14.980 Cocaine-induced anxiety disorder, without use disorder
- F15.188 Amphetamine-type substance (or other stimulant)-induced obsessive-compulsive and related disorder, with mild use disorder
- F15.288 Amphetamine-type substance (or other stimulant)-induced obsessive-compulsive and related disorder, with moderate or severe use disorder
- F15.988 Amphetamine-type substance (or other stimulant)-induced obsessive-compulsive and related disorder, without use disorder
- F14.188 Cocaine-induced obsessive-compulsive and related disorder, with mild use disorder
- F14.288 Cocaine-induced obsessive-compulsive and related disorder, with moderate or severe use disorder
- F14.988 Cocaine-induced obsessive-compulsive and related disorder, without use disorder
- F15.182 Amphetamine-type substance (or other stimulant)-induced sleep disorder, with mild use disorder
- F15.282 Amphetamine-type substance (or other stimulant)-induced sleep disorder, with moderate or severe use disorder
- F15.982 Amphetamine-type substance (or other stimulant)-induced sleep disorder, without use disorder
- F14.182 Cocaine-induced sleep disorder, with mild use disorder
- F14.282 Cocaine-induced sleep disorder, with moderate or severe use disorder
- F14.982 Cocaine-induced sleep disorder, without use disorder
- F15.181 Amphetamine-type substance (or other stimulant)-induced sexual dysfunction, with mild use disorder
- F15.281 Amphetamine-type substance (or other stimulant)-induced sexual dysfunction, with moderate or severe use disorder
- F15.981 Amphetamine-type substance (or other stimulant)-induced sexual dysfunction, without use disorder
- F14.181 Cocaine-induced sexual dysfunction, with mild use disorder
- F14.281 Cocaine-induced sexual dysfunction, with moderate or severe use disorder
- F14.981 Cocaine-induced sexual dysfunction, without use disorder
- F15.121 Amphetamine-type substance (or other stimulant) intoxication delirium, with mild use disorder
- F15.221 Amphetamine-type substance (or other stimulant) intoxication delirium, with moderate or severe use disorder
- F15.921 Amphetamine-type substance (or other stimulant) intoxication delirium, without use disorder
- F14.121 Cocaine intoxication delirium, with mild use disorder
- F14.221 Cocaine intoxication delirium, with moderate or severe use disorder
- F14.921 Cocaine intoxication delirium, without use disorder
- F15.921 Amphetamine-type (or other stimulant) medication-induced delirium
- F15.188 Amphetamine-type substance (or other stimulant)-induced mild neurocognitive disorder, with mild use disorder
- F15.288 Amphetamine-type substance (or other stimulant)-induced mild neurocognitive disorder, with moderate or severe use disorder
- F15.988 Amphetamine-type substance (or other stimulant)-induced mild neurocognitive disorder, without use disorder
- F14.188 Cocaine-induced mild neurocognitive disorder, with mild use disorder
- F14.288 Cocaine-induced mild neurocognitive disorder, with moderate or severe use disorder
- F14.988 Cocaine-induced mild neurocognitive disorder, without use disorder
- F15.99 Unspecified stimulant-related disorder, amphetamine or other stimulant
- F14.99 Unspecified stimulant-related disorder, cocaine

==== Tobacco-related disorders ====
- Z72.0 Tobacco use disorder, mild
- F17.200 Tobacco use disorder, moderate
  - F17.201 Tobacco use disorder, moderate, in early remission
  - F17.201 Tobacco use disorder, moderate, in sustained remission
- F17.200 Tobacco use disorder, severe
  - F17.201 Tobacco use disorder, severe, in early remission
  - F17.201 Tobacco use disorder, severe, in sustained remission
- F17.203 Tobacco withdrawal
- F17.208 Tobacco-induced sleep disorder, with moderate or severe use disorder
- F17.209 Unspecified tobacco-related disorder

==== Other (or unknown) substance-related disorders ====
- F19.10 Other (or unknown) substance use disorder, mild
  - F19.11 Other (or unknown) substance use disorder, mild, in early remission
  - F19.11 Other (or unknown) substance use disorder, mild, in sustained remission
- F19.20 Other (or unknown) substance use disorder, moderate
  - F19.21 Other (or unknown) substance use disorder, moderate, in early remission
  - F19.21 Other (or unknown) substance use disorder, moderate, in sustained remission
- F19.20 Other (or unknown) substance use disorder, severe
  - F19.21 Other (or unknown) substance use disorder, severe, in early remission
  - F19.21 Other (or unknown) substance use disorder, severe, in sustained remission
- F19.129 Other (or unknown) substance intoxication, with mild use disorder
- F19.229 Other (or unknown) substance intoxication, with moderate or severe use disorder
- F19.929 Other (or unknown) substance intoxication, without use disorder
- F19.120 Other (or unknown) substance intoxication, without perceptual disturbances, with mild use disorder
- F19.220 Other (or unknown) substance intoxication, without perceptual disturbances, with moderate or severe use disorder
- F19.920 Other (or unknown) substance intoxication, without perceptual disturbances, without use disorder
- F19.122 Other (or unknown) substance intoxication, with perceptual disturbances, with mild use disorder
- F19.222 Other (or unknown) substance intoxication, with perceptual disturbances, with moderate or severe use disorder
- F19.922 Other (or unknown) substance intoxication, with perceptual disturbances, without use disorder
- F19.239 Other (or unknown) substance withdrawal
- F19.130 Other (or unknown) substance withdrawal, without perceptual disturbances, with mild use disorder
- F19.230 Other (or unknown) substance withdrawal, without perceptual disturbances, with moderate or severe use disorder
- F19.930 Other (or unknown) substance withdrawal, without perceptual disturbances, without use disorder
- F19.132 Other (or unknown) substance withdrawal, with perceptual disturbances, with mild use disorder
- F19.232 Other (or unknown) substance withdrawal, with perceptual disturbances, with moderate or severe use disorder
- F19.932 Other (or unknown) substance withdrawal, with perceptual disturbances, without use disorder
- F19.159 Other (or unknown) substance-induced psychotic disorder, with mild use disorder
- F19.259 Other (or unknown) substance-induced psychotic disorder, with moderate or severe use disorder
- F19.929 Other (or unknown) substance-induced psychotic disorder, without use disorder
- F19.14 Other (or unknown) substance-induced bipolar and related disorder, with mild use disorder
- F19.24 Other (or unknown) substance-induced bipolar and related disorder, with moderate or severe use disorder
- F19.94 Other (or unknown) substance-induced bipolar and related disorder, without use disorder
- F19.14 Other (or unknown) substance-induced depressive disorder, with mild use disorder
- F19.24 Other (or unknown) substance-induced depressive disorder, with moderate or severe use disorder
- F19.94 Other (or unknown) substance-induced depressive disorder, without use disorder
- F19.180 Other (or unknown) substance-induced anxiety disorder, with mild use disorder
- F19.280 Other (or unknown) substance-induced anxiety disorder, with moderate or severe use disorder
- F19.980 Other (or unknown) substance-induced anxiety disorder, without use disorder
- F19.188 Other (or unknown) substance-induced obsessive-compulsive and related disorder, with mild use disorder
- F19.288 Other (or unknown) substance-induced obsessive-compulsive and related disorder, with moderate or severe use disorder
- F19.988 Other (or unknown) substance-induced obsessive-compulsive and related disorder, without use disorder
- F19.182 Other (or unknown) substance-induced sleep disorder, with mild use disorder
- F19.282 Other (or unknown) substance-induced sleep disorder, with moderate or severe use disorder
- F19.982 Other (or unknown) substance-induced sleep disorder, without use disorder
- F19.181 Other (or unknown) substance-induced sexual dysfunction, with mild use disorder
- F19.281 Other (or unknown) substance-induced sexual dysfunction, with moderate or severe use disorder
- F19.921 Other (or unknown) substance-induced sexual dysfunction, without use disorder
- F19.121 Other (or unknown) substance intoxication delirium, with mild use disorder
- F19.221 Other (or unknown) substance intoxication delirium, with moderate or severe use disorder
- F19.921 Other (or unknown) substance intoxication delirium, without use disorder
- F19.131 Other (or unknown) substance withdrawal delirium, with mild use disorder
- F19.231 Other (or unknown) substance withdrawal delirium, with moderate or severe use disorder
- F19.931 Other (or unknown) substance withdrawal delirium, without use disorder
- F19.921 Other (or unknown) medication-induced delirium when other (or unknown) medication taken as prescribed
- F19.931 Other (or unknown) medication-induced delirium during withdrawal from other (or unknown) medication taken as prescribed
- F19.17 Other (or unknown) substance-induced major neurocognitive disorder, with mild use disorder
- F19.27 Other (or unknown) substance-induced major neurocognitive disorder, with moderate or severe use disorder
- F19.97 Other (or unknown) substance-induced major neurocognitive disorder, without use disorder
- F19.188 Other (or unknown) substance-induced mild neurocognitive disorder, with mild use disorder
- F19.288 Other (or unknown) substance-induced mild neurocognitive disorder, with moderate or severe use disorder
- F19.988 Other (or unknown) substance-induced mild neurocognitive disorder, without use disorder
- F19.99 Unspecified other (or unknown) substance-related disorder

=== Non-substance-related disorders ===
- F63.0 Gambling disorder

== Neurocognitive disorders ==
- F05 Delirium due to another medical condition
- F05 Delirium due to multiple etiologies
- F05 Other specified delirium (Note: Formerly coded as R41.0)
- F05 Unspecified delirium

=== Major and mild neurocognitive disorders ===
==== Major or mild neurocognitive disorder due to Alzheimer's disease ====
- F02.A Probable major neurocognitive disorder due to Alzheimer's disease, mild
- F02.B Probable major neurocognitive disorder due to Alzheimer's disease, moderate
- F02.C Probable major neurocognitive disorder due to Alzheimer's disease, severe
- F02.81 Probable major neurocognitive disorder due to Alzheimer's disease, with behavioral disturbance (Note: Code no longer used as of 1 October 2022)
  - F02.x11 Probable major neurocognitive disorder due to Alzheimer's disease, with agitation
  - F02.x4 Probable major neurocognitive disorder due to Alzheimer's disease, with anxiety
  - F02.x3 Probable major neurocognitive disorder due to Alzheimer's disease, with mood symptoms
  - F02.x2 Probable major neurocognitive disorder due to Alzheimer's disease, with psychotic disturbance
  - F02.x18 Probable major neurocognitive disorder due to Alzheimer's disease, with other behavioral or psychological disturbance
- F02.80 Probable major neurocognitive disorder due to Alzheimer's disease, without behavioral disturbance
  - F02.x0 Probable major neurocognitive disorder due to Alzheimer's disease, without accompanying behavioral or psychological disturbance
- F03.A Possible major neurocognitive disorder due to Alzheimer's disease, mild
- F03.B Possible major neurocognitive disorder due to Alzheimer's disease, moderate
- F03.C Possible major neurocognitive disorder due to Alzheimer's disease, severe
- G31.9 Possible major neurocognitive disorder due to Alzheimer's disease
- G31.84 Mild neurocognitive disorder due to Alzheimer's disease

==== Major or mild frontotemporal neurocognitive disorder ====
- F02.A Probable major neurocognitive disorder due to frontotemporal lobar degeneration, mild
- F02.B Probable major neurocognitive disorder due to frontotemporal lobar degeneration, moderate
- F02.C Probable major neurocognitive disorder due to frontotemporal lobar degeneration, severe
- F02.81 Probable major neurocognitive disorder due to frontotemporal lobar degeneration, with behavioral disturbance
  - F02.x11 Probable major neurocognitive disorder due to frontotemporal lobar degeneration, with agitation
  - F02.x4 Probable major neurocognitive disorder due to frontotemporal lobar degeneration, with anxiety
  - F02.x3 Probable major neurocognitive disorder due to frontotemporal lobar degeneration, with mood symptoms
  - F02.x2 Probable major neurocognitive disorder due to frontotemporal lobar degeneration, with psychotic disturbance
  - F02.x18 Probable major neurocognitive disorder due to frontotemporal lobar degeneration, with other behavioral or psychological disturbance
- F02.80 Probable major neurocognitive disorder due to frontotemporal lobar degeneration, without behavioral disturbance
  - F02.x0 Probable major neurocognitive disorder due to frontotemporal lobar degeneration, without accompanying behavioral or psychological disturbance
- G31.9 Possible major neurocognitive disorder due to frontotemporal lobar degeneration
- F03.A Possible major neurocognitive disorder due to frontotemporal lobar degeneration, mild
- F03.B Possible major neurocognitive disorder due to frontotemporal lobar degeneration, moderate
- F03.C Possible major neurocognitive disorder due to frontotemporal lobar degeneration, severe
- G31.84 Mild neurocognitive disorder due to frontotemporal lobar degeneration

==== Major or mild neurocognitive disorder with Lewy bodies ====
- F02.A Probable major neurocognitive disorder with Lewy bodies, mild
- F02.B Probable major neurocognitive disorder with Lewy bodies, moderate
- F02.C Probable major neurocognitive disorder with Lewy bodies, severe
- F02.81 Probable major neurocognitive disorder with Lewy bodies, with behavioral disturbance
  - F02.x11 Probable major neurocognitive disorder with Lewy bodies, with agitation
  - F02.x4 Probable major neurocognitive disorder with Lewy bodies, with anxiety
  - F02.x3 Probable major neurocognitive disorder with Lewy bodies, with mood symptoms
  - F02.x2 Probable major neurocognitive disorder with Lewy bodies, with psychotic disturbance
  - F02.x18 Probable major neurocognitive disorder with Lewy bodies, with other behavioral or psychological disturbance
- F02.80 Probable major neurocognitive disorder with Lewy bodies, without behavioral disturbance
  - F02.x0 Probable major neurocognitive disorder with Lewy bodies, without accompanying behavioral or psychological disturbance
- G31.9 Possible major neurocognitive disorder with Lewy bodies
- F03.A Possible major neurocognitive disorder with Lewy bodies, mild
- F03.B Possible major neurocognitive disorder with Lewy bodies, moderate
- F03.C Possible major neurocognitive disorder with Lewy bodies, severe
- G31.84 Mild neurocognitive disorder with Lewy bodies

==== Major or mild vascular neurocognitive disorder ====
- F01.A Probable major vascular neurocognitive disorder, mild
- F01.B Probable major vascular neurocognitive disorder, moderate
- F01.C Probable major vascular neurocognitive disorder, severe
- F01.51 Probable major vascular neurocognitive disorder, with behavioral disturbance
  - F01.x11 Probable major vascular neurocognitive disorder, with agitation
  - F01.x4 Probable major vascular neurocognitive disorder, with anxiety
  - F01.x3 Probable major vascular neurocognitive disorder, with mood symptoms
  - F01.x2 Probable major vascular neurocognitive disorder, with psychotic disturbance
  - F01.x18 Probable major vascular neurocognitive disorder, with other behavioral or psychological disturbance
- F01.50 Probable major vascular neurocognitive disorder, without behavioral disturbance
  - F01.x0 Probable major vascular neurocognitive disorder, without accompanying behavioral or psychological disturbance
- G31.9 Possible major vascular neurocognitive disorder
- F03.A Possible major vascular neurocognitive disorder, mild
- F03.B Possible major vascular neurocognitive disorder, moderate
- F03.C Possible major vascular neurocognitive disorder, severe
- G31.84 Mild vascular neurocognitive disorder

==== Major or mild neurocognitive disorder due to traumatic brain injury ====
- F02.A Major neurocognitive disorder due to traumatic brain injury, mild
- F02.B Major neurocognitive disorder due to traumatic brain injury, moderate
- F02.C Major neurocognitive disorder due to traumatic brain injury, severe
- F02.81 Major neurocognitive disorder due to traumatic brain injury, with behavioral disturbance
  - F02.x11 Major neurocognitive disorder due to traumatic brain injury, with agitation
  - F02.x4 Major neurocognitive disorder due to traumatic brain injury, with anxiety
  - F02.x3 Major neurocognitive disorder due to traumatic brain injury, with mood symptoms
  - F02.x2 Major neurocognitive disorder due to traumatic brain injury, with psychotic disturbance
  - F02.x18 Major neurocognitive disorder due to traumatic brain injury, with other behavioral or psychological disturbance
- F02.80 Major neurocognitive disorder due to traumatic brain injury, without behavioral disturbance
  - F02.x0 Major neurocognitive disorder due to traumatic brain injury, without accompanying behavioral or psychological disturbance
- G31.84 Mild neurocognitive disorder due to traumatic brain injury

==== Major or mild neurocognitive disorder due to HIV infection ====
- F02.A Major neurocognitive disorder due to HIV infection, mild
- F02.B Major neurocognitive disorder due to HIV infection, moderate
- F02.C Major neurocognitive disorder due to HIV infection, severe
- F02.81 Major neurocognitive disorder due to HIV infection, with behavioral disturbance
  - F02.x11 Major neurocognitive disorder due to HIV infection, with agitation
  - F02.x4 Major neurocognitive disorder due to HIV infection, with anxiety
  - F02.x3 Major neurocognitive disorder due to HIV infection, with mood symptoms
  - F02.x2 Major neurocognitive disorder due to HIV infection, with psychotic disturbance
  - F02.x18 Major neurocognitive disorder due to HIV infection, with other behavioral or psychological disturbance
- F02.80 Major neurocognitive disorder due to HIV infection, without behavioral disturbance
  - F02.x0 Major neurocognitive disorder due to HIV infection, without accompanying behavioral or psychological disturbance
- G31.84 Mild neurocognitive disorder due to HIV infection

==== Major or mild neurocognitive disorder due to prion disease ====
- F02.A Major neurocognitive disorder due to prion disease, mild
- F02.B Major neurocognitive disorder due to prion disease, moderate
- F02.C Major neurocognitive disorder due to prion disease, severe
- F02.81 Major neurocognitive disorder due to prion disease, with behavioral disturbace
  - F02.x11 Major neurocognitive disorder due to prion disease, with agitation
  - F02.x4 Major neurocognitive disorder due to prion disease, with anxiety
  - F02.x3 Major neurocognitive disorder due to prion disease, with mood symptoms
  - F02.x2 Major neurocognitive disorder due to prion disease, with psychotic disturbance
  - F02.x18 Major neurocognitive disorder due to prion disease, with other behavioral or psychological disturbance
- F02.80 Major neurocognitive disorder due to prion disease, without behavioral disturbance
  - F02.x0 Major neurocognitive disorder due to prion disease, without accompanying behavioral or psychological disturbance
- G31.84 Mild neurocognitive disorder due to prion disease

==== Major or mild neurocognitive disorder due to Parkinson's disease ====
- F02.A Probable major neurocognitive disorder due to Parkinson's disease, mild
- F02.B Probable major neurocognitive disorder due to Parkinson's disease, moderate
- F02.C Probable major neurocognitive disorder due to Parkinson's disease, severe
- F02.81 Major neurocognitive disorder probably due to Parkinson's disease, with behavioral disturbance
  - F02.x11 Probable major neurocognitive disorder due to Parkinson's disease, with agitation
  - F02.x4 Probable major neurocognitive disorder due to Parkinson's disease, with anxiety
  - F02.x3 Probable major neurocognitive disorder due to Parkinson's disease, with mood symptoms
  - F02.x2 Probable major neurocognitive disorder due to Parkinson's disease, with psychotic disturbance
  - F02.x18 Probable major neurocognitive disorder due to Parkinson's disease, with other behavioral or psychological disturbance
- F02.80 Major neurocognitive disorder probably due to Parkinson's disease, without behavioral disturbance
  - F02.x0 Probable major neurocognitive disorder due to Parkinson's disease, without accompanying behavioral or psychological disturbance
- F03.A Possible major neurocognitive disorder due to Parkinson's disease, mild
- F03.B Possible major neurocognitive disorder due to Parkinson's disease, moderate
- F03.C Possible major neurocognitive disorder due to Parkinson's disease, severe
- G31.9 Major neurocogitive disorder possibly due to Parkinson's disease
- G31.84 Mild neurocognitive disorder due to Parkinson's disease

==== Major or mild neurocognitive disorder due to Huntington's disease ====
- F02.A Major neurocognitive disorder due to Huntington's disease, mild
- F02.B Major neurocognitive disorder due to Huntington's disease, moderate
- F02.C Major neurocognitive disorder due to Huntington's disease, severe
- F02.81 Major neurocognitive disorder due to Huntington's disease, with behavioral disturbance
  - F02.x11 Major neurocognitive disorder due to Huntington's disease, with agitation
  - F02.x4 Major neurocognitive disorder due to Huntington's disease, with anxiety
  - F02.x3 Major neurocognitive disorder due to Huntington's disease, with mood symptoms
  - F02.x2 Major neurocognitive disorder due to Huntington's disease, with psychotic disturbance
  - F02.x18 Major neurocognitive disorder due to Huntington's disease, with other behavioral or psychological disturbance
- F02.80 Major neurocognitive disorder due to Huntington's disease, without behavioral disturbance
  - F02.x0 Major neurocognitive disorder due to Huntington's disease, without accompanying behavioral or psychological disturbance
- G31.84 Mild neurocognitive disorder due to Huntington's disease

==== Major or mild neurocognitive disorder due to another medical condition ====
- F02.A Major neurocognitive disorder due to another medical condition, mild
- F02.B Major neurocognitive disorder due to another medical condition, moderate
- F02.C Major neurocognitive disorder due to another medical condition, severe
- F02.81 Major neurocognitive disorder due to another medical condition, with behavioral disturbance
  - F02.x11 Major neurocognitive disorder due another medical condition, with agitation
  - F02.x4 Major neurocognitive disorder due to another medical condition, with anxiety
  - F02.x3 Major neurocognitive disorder due to another medical condition, with mood symptoms
  - F02.x2 Major neurocognitive disorder due to another medical condition, with psychotic disturbance
  - F02.x18 Major neurocognitive disorder due to another medical condition, with other behavioral or psychological disturbance
- F02.80 Major neurocognitive disorder due to another medical condition, without behavioral disturbance
  - F02.x0 Major neurocognitive disorder due to another medical condition, without accompanying behavioral or psychological disturbance
- G31.84 Mild neurocognitive disorder due to another medical condition

==== Major or mild neurocognitive disorder due to multiple etiologies ====
- F02.A Major neurocognitive disorder due to multiple etiologies, mild
- F02.B Major neurocognitive disorder due to multiple etiologies, moderate
- F02.C Major neurocognitive disorder due to multiple etiologies, severe
- F02.81 Major neurocognitive disorder due to multiple etiologies, with behavioral disturbance
  - F02.x11 Major neurocognitive disorder due another medical condition, with agitation
  - F02.x4 Major neurocognitive disorder due to multiple etiologies, with anxiety
  - F02.x3 Major neurocognitive disorder due to multiple etiologies, with mood symptoms
  - F02.x2 Major neurocognitive disorder due to multiple etiologies, with psychotic disturbance
  - F02.x18 Major neurocognitive disorder due to multiple etiologies, with other behavioral or psychological disturbance
- F02.80 Major neurocognitive disorder due to multiple etiologies, without behavioral disturbance
  - F02.x0 Major neurocognitive disorder due to multiple etiologies, without accompanying behavioral or psychological disturbance
- G31.84 Mild neurocognitive disorder due to multiple etiologies

==== Unspecified neurocognitive disorder ====
- R41.9 Unspecified neurocognitive disorder

== Personality disorders ==
=== Cluster A personality disorders ===
- F60.0 Paranoid personality disorder
- F60.1 Schizoid personality disorder
- F21 Schizotypal personality disorder

=== Cluster B personality disorders ===
- F60.2 Antisocial personality disorder
- F60.3 Borderline personality disorder
- F60.4 Histrionic personality disorder
- F60.81 Narcissistic personality disorder

=== Cluster C personality disorders ===
- F60.6 Avoidant personality disorder
- F60.7 Dependent personality disorder
- F60.5 Obsessive-compulsive personality disorder

=== Other personality disorders ===
- F07.0 Personality change due to another medical condition
- F60.89 Other specified personality disorder
- F60.9 Unspecified personality disorder

== Paraphilic disorders ==
- F65.3 Voyeuristic disorder
- F65.2 Exhibitionistic disorder
- F65.81 Frotteuristic disorder
- F65.51 Sexual masochism disorder
- F65.52 Sexual sadism disorder
- F65.4 Pedophilic disorder
- F65.0 Fetishistic disorder
- F65.1 Transvestic disorder
- F65.89 Other specified paraphilic disorder
- F65.9 Unspecified paraphilic disorder

== Other mental disorders ==
- F06.8 Other specified mental disorder due to another medical condition
- F09 Unspecified mental disorder due to another medical condition
- F99 Other specified mental disorder
- F99 Unspecified mental disorder
- Z03.89 No diagnosis or condition

== Medication-induced movement disorders and other adverse effects of medication ==
- G21.11 Antipsychotic medication- and other dopamine receptor blocking agent-induced Parkinsonism (Note: Listed as neuroleptic-induced Parkinsonism in the DSM-5)
- G21.19 Other medication-induced Parkinsonism
- G21.0 Neuroleptic malignant syndrome
- G24.02 Medication-induced acute dystonia
- G25.71 Medication-induced acute akathisia
- G24.01 Tardive dyskinesia
- G24.09 Tardive dystonia
- G25.71 Tardive akathisia
- G25.1 Medication-induced postural tremor
- G25.79 Other medication-induced movement disorder
- T43.205A Antidepressant discontinuation syndrome, initial encounter
- T43.205D Antidepressant discontinuation syndrome, subsequent encounter
- T43.205S Antidepressant discontinuation syndrome, sequelae

== Other conditions that may be a focus of clinical attention ==
=== Suicidal behavior and nonsuicidal self-injury ===
- T14.91XA Suicidal behavior, initial encounter (Note: Formerly coded as T14.91A)
- T14.91XD Suicidal behavior, subsequent encounter (Note: Formerly coded as T14.91D)
- Z91.51 History of suicidal behavior
- R45.88 Current nonsuicidal self-injury
- Z91.52 History of nonsuicidal self-injury

=== Relational problems ===
==== Problems related to family upbringing ====
- Z62.820 Parent-child relational problem
  - Z62.820 Parent-child relational problem, parent-biological child
  - Z62.821 Parent-child relational problem, parent-adopted child
  - Z62.822 Parent-child relational problem, parent-foster child
  - Z62.898 Parent-child relational problem, other caregiver-child
- Z62.891 Sibling relational problem
- Z62.29 Upbringing away from parents
- Z62.898 Child affected by parental relationship distress

==== Other problems related to primary support group ====
- Z63.0 Relationship distress with spouse or intimate partner
- Z63.5 Disruption of family by separation or divorce
- Z63.8 High expressed emotion level within family
- Z63.4 Uncomplicated bereavement

=== Abuse and neglect ===
==== Child physical abuse ====
- T74.12XA Child physical abuse, confirmed, initial encounter
- T74.12XD Child physical abuse, confirmed, subsequent encounter
- T76.12XA Child physical abuse, suspected, initial encounter
- T76.12XD Child physical abuse, suspected, subsequent encounter
- Z69.010 Encounter for mental health services for victim of child abuse by parent
- Z69.020 Encounter for mental health services for victim of nonparental child abuse
- Z69.810 Personal history (past history) of physical abuse in childhood
- Z69.011 Encounter for mental health services for perpetrator of parental child abuse
- Z69.021 Encounter for mental health services for perpetrator of nonparental child abuse

==== Child sexual abuse ====
- T74.22XA Child sexual abuse, confirmed, initial encounter
- T74.22XD Child sexual abuse, confirmed, subsequent encounter
- T76.22XA Child sexual abuse, suspected, initial encounter
- T76.22XD Child sexual abuse, suspected, subsequent encounter
- Z69.010 Encounter for mental health services for victim of child sexual abuse by parent
- Z69.020 Encounter for mental health services for victim of nonparental child sexual abuse
- Z69.810 Personal history (past history) of sexual abuse in childhood
- Z69.011 Encounter for mental health services for perpetrator of parental child sexual abuse
- Z69.021 Encounter for mental health services for perpetrator of nonparental child sexual abuse

==== Child neglect ====
- T74.02XA Child neglect, confirmed, initial encounter
- T74.02XD Child neglect, confirmed, subsequent encounter
- T76.02XA Child neglect, suspected, initial encounter
- T76.02XD Child neglect, suspected, subsequent encounter
- Z69.010 Encounter for mental health services for victim of child neglect by parent
- Z69.020 Encounter for mental health services for victim of nonparental child neglect
- Z69.810 Personal history (past history) of neglect in childhood
- Z69.011 Encounter for mental health services for perpetrator of parental child neglect
- Z69.021 Encounter for mental health services for perpetrator of nonparental child neglect

==== Child psychological abuse ====
- T74.32XA Child psychological abuse, confirmed, initial encounter
- T74.32XD Child psychological abuse, confirmed, subsequent encounter
- T76.32XA Child psychological abuse, suspected, initial encounter
- T76.32XD Child psychological abuse, suspected, subsequent encounter
- Z69.010 Encounter for mental health services for victim of child psychological abuse by parent
- Z69.020 Encounter for mental health services for victim of nonparental child psychological abuse
- Z69.810 Personal history (past history) of psychological abuse in childhood
- Z69.011 Encounter for mental health services for perpetrator of parental child psychological abuse
- Z69.021 Encounter for mental health services for perpetrator of nonparental child psychological abuse

==== Spouse or partner violence, physical ====
- T74.11XA Spouse or partner violence, physical, confirmed, initial encounter
- T74.11XD Spouse or partner violence, physical, confirmed, subsequent encounter
- T76.11XA Spouse or partner violence, physical, suspected, initial encounter
- T76.11XD Spouse or partner violence, physical, suspected, subsequent encounter
- Z69.11 Encounter for mental health services for victim of spouse or partner violence, physical
- Z91.410 Personal history (past history) of spouse or partner violence, physical
- Z69.12 Encounter for mental health services for perpetrator of spouse or partner violence, physical

==== Spouse or partner violence, sexual ====
- T74.21XA Spouse or partner violence, sexual, confirmed, initial encounter
- T74.21XD Spouse or partner violence, sexual, confirmed, subsequent encounter
- T76.21XA Spouse or partner violence, sexual, suspected, initial encounter
- T76.21XD Spouse or partner violence, sexual, suspected, subsequent encounter
- Z69.11 Encounter for mental health services for victim of spouse or partner violence, sexual
- Z91.410 Personal history (past history) of spouse or partner violence, sexual
- Z69.12 Encounter for mental health services for perpetrator of spouse or partner violence, sexual

==== Spouse or partner neglect ====
- T74.01XA Spouse or partner neglect, confirmed, initial encounter
- T74.01XD Spouse or partner neglect, confirmed, subsequent encounter
- T76.01XA Spouse or partner neglect, suspected, initial encounter
- T76.01XD Spouse or partner neglect, suspected, subsequent encounter
- Z69.11 Encounter for mental health services for victim of spouse or partner neglect
- Z91.410 Personal history (past history) of spouse or partner neglect
- Z69.12 Encounter for mental health services for perpetrator of spouse or partner neglect

==== Spouse or partner abuse, psychological ====
- T74.31XA Spouse or partner abuse, psychological, confirmed, initial encounter
- T74.31XD Spouse or partner abuse, psychological, confirmed, subsequent encounter
- T76.31XA Spouse or partner abuse, psychological, suspected, initial encounter
- T76.31XD Spouse or partner abuse, psychological, suspected, subsequent encounter
- Z69.11 Encounter for mental health services for victim of spouse or partner psychological abuse
- Z91.410 Personal history (past history) of spouse or partner psychological abuse
- Z69.12 Encounter for mental health services for perpetrator of spouse or partner psychological abuse

==== Adult abuse by nonspouse or nonpartner ====
- T74.11XA Adult physical abuse by nonspouse or nonpartner, confirmed, initial encounter
- T74.11XD Adult physical abuse by nonspouse or nonpartner, confirmed, subsequent encounter
- T76.11XA Adult physical abuse by nonspouse or nonpartner, suspected, initial encounter
- T76.11XD Adult physical abuse by nonspouse or nonpartner, suspected, subsequent encounter
- T74.21XA Adult sexual abuse by nonspouse or nonpartner, confirmed, initial encounter
- T74.21XD Adult sexual abuse by nonspouse or nonpartner, confirmed, subsequent encounter
- T76.21XA Adult sexual abuse by nonspouse or nonpartner, suspected, initial encounter
- T76.21XD Adult sexual abuse by nonspouse or nonpartner, suspected, subsequent encounter
- T74.31XA Adult psychological abuse by nonspouse or nonpartner, confirmed, initial encounter
- T74.31XD Adult psychological abuse by nonspouse or nonpartner, confirmed, subsequent encounter
- T76.31XA Adult psychological abuse by nonspouse or nonpartner, suspected, initial encounter
- T76.31XD Adult psychological abuse by nonspouse or nonpartner, suspected, subsequent encounter
- Z69.81 Encounter for mental health services for victim of nonspousal adult abuse
- Z69.82 Encounter for mental health services for perpetrator of nonspousal adult abuse

=== Educational and occupational problems ===
- Z55.9 Academic or educational problem
- Z55.0 Illiteracy and low-level literacy
- Z55.1 Schooling unavailable and unattainable
- Z55.2 Failed school examinations
- Z55.3 Underachievement in school
- Z55.4 Educational maladjustment and discord with teachers and classmates
- Z55.8 Problems related to inadequate teaching
- Z55.9 Other problems related to education and literacy
- Z56.82 Problem related to current military deployment status
- Z56.0 Unemployment
- Z56.1 Change of job
- Z56.2 Threat of job loss
- Z56.3 Stressful work schedule
- Z56.4 Discord with boss and workmates
- Z56.5 Uncongenial work environment
- Z56.6 Other physical and mental strain related to work
- Z56.81 Sexual harassment on the job
- Z56.9 Other problem related to employment

=== Housing and economic problems ===
- Z59.0 Homelessness
  - Z59.01 Sheltered homelessness
  - Z59.02 Unsheltered homelessness
- Z59.10 Inadequate housing (Note: Formerly coded as Z59.0)
- Z59.2 Discord with neighbor, lodger, or landlord
- Z59.3 Problem related to living in a residential institution
- Z59.4 Lack of adequate food or safe drinking water
  - Z59.41 Food insecurity (Note: Formerly coded as F59.41)
  - Z58.6 Lack of safe drinking water
- Z59.5 Extreme poverty
- Z59.6 Low income
- Z59.7 Insufficient social or health insurance or welfare support (Note: Listed as insufficient social insurance or welfare support in the DSM-5)
  - Z59.71 Insufficient health insurance
  - Z59.72 Insufficient welfare support
- Z59.9 Unspecified housing or economic problem
- Z59.9 Other housing problem
- Z59.9 Other economic problem

=== Other problems related to the social environment ===
- Z60.2 Problem related to living alone
- Z60.3 Acculturation difficulty
- Z60.4 Social exclusion or rejection
- Z60.5 Target of (perceived) adverse discrimination or persecution
- Z60.9 Other problem related to social environment (Note: Listed as unspecified problem related to social environment in the DSM-5)

=== Problems related to crime or interaction with the legal system ===
- Z65.4 Victim of crime
- Z65.0 Conviction in civil or criminal proceedings without imprisonment
- Z65.1 Imprisonment or other incarceration
- Z65.2 Problems related to release from prison
- Z65.3 Problems related to other legal circumstances

=== Problems related to psychosocial, personal, and environmental circumstances ===
- Z72.9 Problems due to lifestyle
- Z64.0 Problems related to unwanted pregnancy
- Z64.1 Problems related to multiparity
- Z64.4 Discord with social service provider, including probation officer, case manager, or social services worker
- Z65.4 Victim of terrorism or torture
- Z65.5 Exposure to disaster, war, or other hostilities
- Z65.8 Other problem related to psychosocial circumstances
- Z65.9 Unspecified problem related to unspecified psychosocial circumstances

=== Problems related to access to medical and other health care ===
- Z75.3 Unavailability or inaccessibility of health care facilities
- Z75.4 Unavailability or inaccessibility of other helping agencies

=== Circumstances of personal history ===
- Z91.49 Personal history of psychological trauma
- Z91.82 Personal history of military deployment
- Z91.89 Other personal risk factors

=== Other health service encounters for counseling and medical advice ===
- Z31.5 Genetic counseling
- Z70.9 Sex counseling
- Z71.3 Dietary counseling
- Z71.9 Other counseling or consultation

=== Additional conditions or problems that may be a focus of clinical attention ===
- Z60.0 Phase of life problem
- Z65.8 Moral, religious, or spiritual problem (Note: Formerly listed as religious or spiritual problem)
- Z72.811 Adult antisocial behavior
- Z72.810 Child or adolescent antisocial behavior
- Z91.19 Nonadherance to medical treatment
- E66.9 Overweight or obesity
- Z76.5 Malingering
- Z91.83 Wandering associated with a mental disorder
- R41.83 Borderline intellectual functioning
- R41.81 Age-related cognitive decline
- R45.89 Impairing emotional outbursts

== Sources ==
- American Psychiatric Association (2013). Diagnostic and Statistical Manual of Mental Disorders (Fifth ed.). Arlington, VA: American Psychiatric Publishing. ISBN 978-0-89042-555-8.
- American Psychiatric Association, ed. (2022). Diagnostic and Statistical Manual of Mental Disorders, Fifth Edition, Text Revision (DSM-5-TR). Washington, DC, USA: American Psychiatric Publishing. ISBN 978-0-89042-575-6.
- American Psychiatric Association (2025). "DSM-5-TR Update".
