= Persona Live 2026: Awakenings =

Musical concert tour

- Tour by Sega
- Promotional artwork of Persona Live 2026: Awakenings
- Location: North America
- Start date: January 23, 2026
- End date: January 24, 2026
- No. of shows: 3

Persona Live 2026: Awakenings was a North American concert tour of the Persona Music Experience series by Sega. The concerts featured music from Persona 5, Persona 5 Tactica, Persona 5: The Phantom X, and Persona 3 Reload.

== Announcement ==
The first announcement of the US concerts was made in July 2025 at Anime Expo in Los Angeles, California. Later that year, on November 3, Atlus announced a concert date on their social media platforms. However, three days later, due to overwhelming demand, an additional date was added. Wesley LeBlanc, Senior Associate Editor of Game Informer, wrote that the limited run of shows suggests "a test run for a wider U.S. tour." Ticket sales began on November 5 with pre-sale tickets, and on November 7, they were available to the public.

== Reception ==
Senior writer of Anime Corner, Jay Gibbs, wrote, "This show was amazing... It was good in a way that left me simultaneously incredibly happy with what I got while also wanting more." Executive Editor of Smash Pad, Danreb Victorio, rated the performance with four stars out of five and wrote, "It was definitely a treat seeing these vocal performances live." The writer of The-O Network, Ken Dubois, described the highlight of the concert as, "The energetic choreography of the live dancers and the audience's palpable enthusiasm."

== Personal ==
Along with the musicians, dancers dressed as several characters from Persona 5 and Persona 3 Reload performed alongside the main performers.

== Tour dates ==
List of 2026 concerts
Date (2026	City	Country	Venue	Attendance
23 January	Los Angeles	United States	Dolby Theatre	3,400
24 January (2 Shows)	Los Angeles	United States	Dolby Theatre	3,400
