= Sexual harassment in Japan =

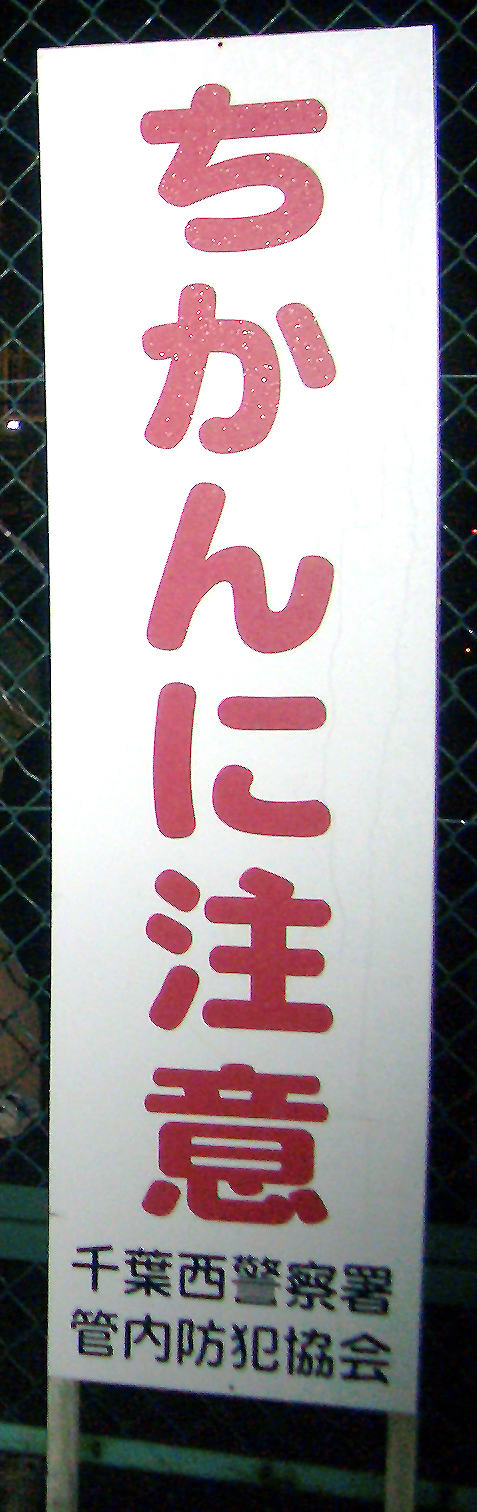
SexPublic sign in Chiba, Japan, warning of chikan

Sexual harassmant in Japan (Japanese: セクハラ) is a widespread social problem. The Department of Labor received 11,289 consultations regarding sexual harassment (approximately 60% from female workers, 5% from male workers, and 35% from others) in 2014. However, given the generally low rate of reported sexual offenders (about 10%), the dark figure of sexual harassers is believed to be substantial, with 34.7% of full-time employees experiencing sexual harassment, according to the Japan Institute for Labor Policy and Training.

It appeared most dramatically in Japanese discourse in 1989, when a court case in Fukuoka ruled in favor of a woman who had been subjected to the spreading of sexual rumors by a co-worker. When the case was first reported, it spawned a flurry of public interest: 10 books were published, including English-language feminist guidebooks to 'how not to harass women' texts for men. Sekuhara was named 1989's 'Word of the Year'. The case was resolved in the victim's favor in 1992, awarding her about $13,000 in damages, the first sexual harassment lawsuit in Japanese history. Laws then established two forms of sexual harassment: taika-gata, in which rewards or penalties are explicitly linked to sexual acts, and kankyo-gata, in which the environment is made unpleasant through sexual talk or jokes, touching, or hanging sexually explicit posters. This applies to everyone in an office, including customers.

== See also ==
- Chikan
