= Kurt Freund =

Czech-Canadian physician and sexologist (1914–1996)

- Freund circa 1966
- Born: 17 January 1914; Chrudim, Kingdom of Bohemia
- Died: 23 October 1996 (aged 82); Toronto, Ontario, Canada
- Citizenship: Czechoslovakia, Canada
- Education: Charles University in Prague
- Known for: Penile plethysmograph, courtship disorder
- Scientific career
- Fields: Sexologist
- Workplaces: Department of Psychiatry at Charles University in Prague, Clarke Institute of Psychiatry

Kurt Freund (17 January 1914 – 23 October 1996) was a Czech-Canadian physician and sexologist best known for developing the penile plethysmograph (a measurement of sexual arousal in males), research studies in pedophilia, and for the "courtship disorder" hypothesis as a taxonomy of certain paraphilias (voyeurism, exhibitionism, toucherism, frotteurism, and what he called "preferential rape"). After unsuccessful attempts to change men's sexual orientation, he advocated against conversion therapy and in favor of the decriminalization of homosexuality.

== Early life ==
Freund was born into a German-speaking Jewish family in Chrudim, then part of the Kingdom of Bohemia, later Czechoslovakia, now in the Czech Republic. He married Anna Hlounová, a non-Jewish Czech pianist and music teacher, on 13 January 1942. In 1943, they divorced in order to protect Anna and their newborn daughter Helen from anti-Jewish and anti-miscegenation legislation implemented by the German Nazi Occupiers. They remarried after the war in 1945, and Anna gave birth to a son, Peter, in 1948. Many of Freund's relatives were murdered in the Holocaust, including his parents Heinrich and Hella, and his brother Hans.

== Research ==
In 1948, Freund joined the Department of Psychiatry at Charles University in Prague. Freund received his M.D. at Charles University of Prague, and later a D.Sc. degree there in 1962. He carried out post-doctoral research and later both research and clinical work at Charles University's Sexological Institute. Freund fled to Canada in 1968, in the wake of the Prague Spring. Freund then began plethysmography studies of male sexual orientation at the Centre for Addiction and Mental Health (then called the Clarke Institute of Psychiatry) in Toronto, where much of the research and published data using PPG originated. The Kurt Freund Laboratory at that centre is named after him.

=== Homosexuality ===
Between 1950 and 1953, Freund treated 67 men for homosexual tendencies. Some of his patients voluntarily sought to change their sexual orientation, while others received remission of prosecution or legal penalties so that they could undergo the experiment. Taking a behaviorist perspective, he attempted to reinforce heterosexual feelings while punishing homosexual ones in order to change sexual orientation. Patients were given nausea-inducing drugs while exposed to images of other men, then given testosterone injections and exposed to photographs of naked women. Freund followed up with his patients in 1956 and 1958, concluding that the experiment was not a success. His empirical data showed some of the first evidence that sexual orientation conversion therapy was generally futile. He demonstrated that even homosexually oriented men who appeared to have given up sexual relations with other men and established heterosexual marriages were still aroused by images of men rather than women. Freund also challenged contemporary psychoanalytic theories of male homosexuality that suggested it was due to a fear or aversion to women.

In 1957, he began to advocate for the decriminalization of homosexuality, which happened in Czechoslovakia in 1961 following an official recommendation signed by Freund and other psychiatrists. Like other researchers at the time, however, he continued to see homosexuality as a pathology. In 1977, he apologized for his attempt to change sexual orientation, writing that if his experiment "has 'helped' at all, has helped clients to enter into marriages that later became unbearable or almost unbearable" and expressing doubt that homosexuality should be considered an illness because of the chance that "reasonable social changes may virtually abolish all specific distress of homosexual persons". Freund advised his patients to make peace with their sexual orientation.

=== Penile plethysmography ===
Around 1953, Freund began to develop a device for penile plethysmography to measure blood flow to the penis, building on earlier attempts to create such a device. He was initially commissioned to detect recruits attempting to evade military service by falsely claiming to be homosexual. Over his career, he refined the penile plethysmograph as part of a broad program of research on male sexual interest. Sex offenders could sometimes suppress arousal through concentration or surreptitiously causing themselves pain, similar to methods for producing false results on a polygraph (lie detector). During one experiment, he found that 17% of heterosexuals or homosexuals were able to pretend to be the other sexual orientation during the test. Although he recognized its limitations, Freund continued to advocate for the use of the device to measure male sexual arousal, not only sexual orientation but also pedophilia. During the 1960s, he published several papers informing other researchers to recreate and use the device.

There was controversy regarding potential abuses of devices to measure sexual interests, following fears that it might lead to discrimination against gay men. Phallometric testing has been shown, however, to be one of the most accurate, if not the single most accurate, methods of identifying the sexual offenders that are most likely to commit new sexual offenses against children. On the other hand, another study concluded that "although the validity of the technique for research and clinical assessment is now established, justification for the routine use of the technique must await a proper standardization of the technique and the publication of reliable norms."

=== Paraphilias and sex offenders ===
Initially focused on homosexuality, Freund later expanded his study to pedophilia, rape, transsexuality, and paraphilia. He developed the theory of courtship disorder, explaining paraphilias such as exhibitionism, voyeurism, telephone scatologia, frotteurism, and biastophilia (a preference for rape) as disorders of the normal courtship process. He focused on detection and diagnosis of sex offenders, particularly preference pedophiles, with a view to more appropriate treatment guidelines.

== Death ==
Freund was diagnosed with cancer in 1994 and was a member of Dying with Dignity. When his health deteriorated in 1996, he took a lethal cocktail of muscle relaxants, sleeping pills and wine. Freund was cremated, and his ashes were scattered on the lawn across from his office at the Clarke Institute in Toronto and on the grounds of Psychiatric Hospital Bohnice in Prague, where he had worked for many years in Czechoslovakia.

== Selected publications ==
- Freund, K., J. Diamant, and V. Pinkava. 1958. "On the validity and reliability of the phalloplethysmographic (Php) diagnosis of some sexual deviations." Rev Czech Med 4:145-51.
- Freund, K. 1963. "A Laboratory Method For Diagnosing Predominance of Homo- Or Hetero-Erotic Interest in Male." Behav Res Ther 21:85-93.
- Freund, K. 1962. Homosexualita u muže (Homosexuality in man), Praha: Státní zdravotnické nakladatelství (State Medical Publisher), 274 pp., 3000 copies.
  - Freund, K. 1963. Die Homosexualität beim Mann, 1st ed., Leipzig : S. Hirzel Verlag, 275 pp.
  - Freund, K. 1965. Die Homosexualität beim Mann, 2nd, expanded ed., Leipzig : S. Hirzel Verlag, 321 pp.
- Freund, K. 1965. "A simple device for measuring volume changes of the male genital organ." Československá psychiatrie 61:164-6.
- Freund, K. 1967. "Diagnosing homo- or heterosexuality and erotic age-preference by means of a psychophysiological test." Behav Res Ther 5:209-28.
- Freund, K. 1974. "Male homosexuality: an analysis of the pattern." in Understanding Homosexuality: Its biological and psychological bases, edited by J. A. Lorraine. Lancaster, England: Medical and Technical Publishing Company, Inc.
- Freund, K. 1977. "Should homosexuality arouse therapeutic concern?" J Homosex 2:235-40.
- Freund, K. 1977. "Psychophysiological assessment of change in erotic preferences." Behavioral Research and Therapy 15:297-301.
- Freund, K. 1978. "A conceptual framework for the study of anomalous erotic preferences." J Sex Marital Ther 4:3-10.
- Freund, K., S. Chan, and R. Coulthard. 1979. "Phallometric diagnosis with 'nonadmitters'." Behav Res Ther 17:451-7.
- Freund, K., B. W. Steiner, and S. Chan. 1982. "Two types of cross-gender identity." Arch Sex Behav 11:49-63.
- Freund, K. and R. Blanchard. 1983. "Is the distant relationship of fathers and homosexual sons related to the sons' erotic preference for male partners, or to the sons' atypical gender identity, or to both?" J Homosex 9:7-25.
- Freund, K., H. Scher, and S. Hucker. 1983. "The courtship disorders." Arch Sex Behav 12:369-79.
- Freund, K., H. Scher, I. G. Racansky, K. Campbell, and G. Heasman. 1986. "Males disposed to commit rape." Arch Sex Behav 15:23-35.
- Freund, K. and R. Blanchard. 1986. "The concept of courtship disorder." J Sex Marital Ther 12:79-92.
- Freund, K., Wilson, R. & Rienzo, D. (1987). A comparison of sex offenders against male and female minors. Journal of Sex & Marital Therapy, 13, 260–264.
- Freund, K., Wilson, R. & Rienzo, D. (1988). Signs of feigning in the phallometric test. Behaviour Research & Therapy, 26, 105–112.
- Freund, K., Wilson, R. & Rienzo, D. (1988). The value of self-reports in the study of voyeurism and exhibitionism. Annals of Sex Research, 1, 243–262.
- Freund, K., Wilson, R. & Rienzo, D. (1989). Heterosexuality, homosexuality, and erotic age preference. The Journal of Sex Research, 26, 107–117.
- Freund, K. & Wilson, R. (1990). Mapping the boundaries of courtship disorder. Journal of Sex Research, 27, 589–606.
- Freund, K., Wilson, R. & Dickey, R. (1990). Does sexual abuse in childhood causes pedophilia? An exploratory study. Archives of Sexual Behavior, 19, 557–568.
- Freund, K. & Wilson, R. (1991). Assessment of the sensitivity and specificity of a phallometric test: An update of "Phallometric diagnosis of pedophilia". Psychological Assessment, 3, 254–260.
- Freund, K., Wilson, R., Dickey, R., & Rienzo, D. (1991). Erotic gender differentiation in pedophilia. Archives of Sexual Behavior, 20, 555–566.
- Freund, K., Wilson, R. & Dickey, R. (1991). Sex offenses against female children perpetrated by men who are not pedophiles. Journal of Sex Research, 28, 409–423.
- Freund, K., Wilson, R., & Dickey, R. (1991). The types of heterosexual gender identity disorder. Annals of Sex Research, 4, 93–105.
- Freund, K. & Wilson, R.J. (1992). The proportions of heterosexual and homosexual pedophiles among sex offenders against children. Journal of Sex & Marital Therapy, 18, 34–43.
- Freund, K. & Wilson, R.J. (1993). Gender identity disorder and courtship disorder. Archives of Sexual Behavior, 22, 13–21.
- Freund, K. and M. Kuban. 1993. "Toward a testable developmental model of pedophilia: the development of erotic age preference." Child Abuse Negl 17:315-24.
