= Scatologia =

Scatologia may refer to:

- Scatology, the study of feces
- Telephone scatologia, making obscene telephone calls
