= Otto Chikan! =

Single by Onyanko Club
- Language: Japanese
- A-side: "Otto Chikan!"
- B-side: "Omoide Bijin"
- Released: April 21, 1986
- Label: Canyon
- Composer(s): Hiro Nagasawa
- Lyricist(s): Yasushi Akimoto

Onyanko Club singles chronology
"Jā ne" (1986)	"Otto Chikan!" (1986)	"Osaki ni Shitsurei" (1986)

"Otto Chikan!" (おっとCHIKAN!) is the 4th single by the Japanese idol girl group Onyanko Club. It was released in Japan on April 21, 1986.

== Outline ==
This song praises the high school girl bullying a nerdy-looking man by accusing him of being a molester when the man truly wanted to give the girl a love letter.

The song was banned from being commercially used on television sometime after its release.

The lyrics are considered extremely offensive in light of the 21st century, where molestation crimes have been severely punished and false accusations of molestation have also become a problem. On the other hand, at the time this was released, music critic Kyōko Sugimura (杉村京子, Sugimura Kyōko) commented as follows. "The content depicted in the lyrics can be forgiven because it is a cute bullying by a high school girl. This is a mischievous song".

== Track listing ==
All lyrics are written by Yasushi Akimoto.

No.	Title	Music	Length
1.	"Otto Chikan!" (おっとCHIKAN!)	Hiro Nagasawa
2.	"Omoide Bijin" (思い出美人)	Masami Tsuchiya

== Charts ==
=== Weekly charts ===
Chart (1986)	Peak position
Japan (Oricon)	1

=== Year-end charts ===
Chart (1986)	Peak position
Japan (Oricon)	44

== See also ==
- 1986 in Japanese music
