= Persona 5: The Phantom X =

2025 video game

- Developer: Black Wings Game Studio (Note: Additional work and support by P-Studio)
- Publisher: Sega: CN: Perfect World
- Directors: Yusuke Nitta; Zhen Wang; Yuta Sakai
- Producers: Lao V / "Vulpe"; Yohsuke Uda; Jun Matsunaga
- Designer: Zhen Wang
- Artists: Xiao Le; Shigenori Soejima
- Writers: Yi Wen; Yusuke Nitta
- Composers: BlackWings Audio (Note: Yifu Sun, Masanori Akita, MovingPoint, Lorne Cui, Oran, Sewind, and Simai Wang); Ryota Kozuka
- Series: Persona
- Engine: Unity
- Platforms: Android; iOS; Windows
- Release: June 26, 2025
- Genres: Role-playing, social simulation
- Mode: Single-player

Persona 5: The Phantom X (Note: Chinese: 女神异闻录：夜幕魅影; pinyin: Nǚshén Yìwénlù: Yèmù Mèiyǐng; lit. 'Alternate Tale of the Goddess: Phantom of the Night') is a 2025 role-playing video game developed by Black Wings Game Studio and published by Perfect World in China and Sega worldwide. It is a spin-off of Persona 5 (2016), which is part of Atlus' Persona series and the larger Megami Tensei franchise.

As with other Persona games, it combines elements of social simulation and dungeon crawling and turn-based combat. The game takes place in modern-day Tokyo and follows a group of characters that wield the power of Persona, a physical manifestation of one's psyche that is strengthened in battle by forging bonds with others. The game follows a high-school student, codenamed "Wonder", as he seeks to retake the hopes and desires of humanity after almost losing them himself. As he undertakes this mission, he uses his free time to raise stats and forge bonds with characters, while also dedicating time to explore the alternate world known as the Metaverse.

Staff members from Persona 5 and the enhanced version Persona 5 Royal are involved in the development, including series producer Kazuhisa Wada as project supervisor, artist Shigenori Soejima designing the protagonist Wonder, and Ryota Kozuka composing the main theme. The cognitive versions of the people met in the city, along with the Phantom Thieves of Hearts from Persona 5 and the Specialized Extracurricular Execution Squad from Persona 3 (Note: The depiction of the Phantom Thieves and SEES members are lifted from Persona 5 Royal and Persona 3 Reload), can be summoned for use in the Metaverse through a gacha system.

The game received positive reviews during its worldwide launch, with critics praising its gameplay, graphics, and story for being similar to the mainline Persona titles, but criticized the writing, particularly for an early-game antagonist, and unbalanced rewards on launch compared to the Chinese release. The game was nominated for Best Mobile Game at The Game Awards 2025, and won Mobile Game of the Year at the 29th Annual D.I.C.E. Awards.

== Gameplay ==
Wonder, the game's protagonist, has two alternating lifestyles: a normal student life (top) and exploring otherworldly locations (bottom).

To accommodate the format of a free-to-play game created primarily for mobile devices, Persona 5: The Phantom X adapts the Persona mechanics with various changes. Like the main titles, it combines elements of social simulation and dungeon crawling. However, in place of the Calendar system, both activities now require energy that replenishes over time or is restored using currency, similar to other mobile games.

As the male silent protagonist (who is named by the player, though he is canonically named Nagisa Kamishiro (Note: His last name is spelled "Kamisiro" due to the eight character limit for both first and last names in the English version.), but also given the codename Wonder) attending the school in modern-day Tokyo, players experience the story events, answer questions in class, and freely explore the city after school or during days off in order to engage in various activities. Some help Wonder earn experience points or money, while others improve his social stats, such as Knowledge or Courage, which affect the gameplay in other ways. Additionally, players can consult the "City Schedule" feature to see the list of suggested activities and available rewards.

The game also features multiple characters that Wonder can interact with in Tokyo using the "Confidant" system. Compared to the main series, it was heavily reworked: the number of ranks has increased, but not every rank results in unique dialogue conversations. The cognitive versions of Confidants also appear as special units that can be summoned using the gacha system.

Like Persona 5, the dungeon crawling portion takes place in the Metaverse, a realm created from subconscious desires that consists of Mementos and Palaces. Mementos is the procedurally generated location consisting of multiple floors that is primarily used for grinding and completing daily quests, while the Palaces are the story-related levels ruled by various bosses.

The battle gameplay remains faithful to the Persona series, using the turn-based system with the "1 more" mechanic when striking enemies' weaknesses. However, unlike the main series, activating "1 more" is always followed by specific skills instead of giving the player complete control over their additional action, and not all enemies can be "downed" in one turn, as some were given a meter that dictates the necessary number of attacks. When all enemies are down, the player can perform a powerful "All-Out Attack".

== Synopsis ==
During an escape from Sae's Casino in the Metaverse (Note: As depicted in Persona 5.), Joker was attacked by a masked assailant. The assailant unmasks himself as Nagisa, who proceeds to shoot him. Nagisa then awakens from his bed, revealing it to be a dream.

While sleeping in class at Kokatsu Academy, Nagisa is drawn into the Velvet Room, taking the form of a tunnel submerged in a sea, and it is occupied by Igor and his assistant, Merope. Igor cites Nagisa's knowledge of choice as his reason for bringing him to the Velvet Room.

Nagisa wakes up in the classroom and begins to see weird experiences around him that lead him to lose desire, such as trying and failing to ask two students to move from the stairs they are blocking, or helping someone who has just jumped off a building. On his way home from school, Nagisa notices a weird app installed on his phone and encounters a talking owl, Lufel. Nagisa accidentally taps the app and brings himself and Lufel to the Metaverse, a supernatural realm representing the unconscious desires of humanity. Lufel explains that humanity's hopes and desires are being stolen, including Nagisa's. While attempting to leave the Metaverse, the pair are attacked by Shadows, creatures formed from warped desires who attack humans on sight. Nagisa awakens his Persona, Jánošík, and is able to defeat the shadows with Lufel's help, allowing them to return to the real world.

Realizing his potential, Lufel recruits Nagisa to help him reclaim the desire of the masses. Lufel points out to Nagisa a former baseball player, Takeyuki Kiuchi, who intentionally rams into women in the subway, and says that in order to stop him, they must enter Kiuchi's Palace within the Metaverse and steal his treasure, an object which is the source of warped desires. On his way to school the following day, Nagisa meets with his classmate Motoha Arai and her best friend, Tomoko Noge, who aspires to play baseball professionally after Motoha abruptly quit baseball. Tomoko saves Motoha from being rammed by Kiuchi, but she herself is thrown onto the tracks, causing a career-ending injury that prevents her from playing baseball.

Nagisa and Lufel enter Kiuchi's palace and discover that Motoha has also accidentally entered the palace, and awakens to her Persona after being physically and verbally berated by a Shadow form of Kiuchi. While traversing through Kiuchi's palace, they discover that Motoha hitting a slider thrown by Kiuchi, along with a scandal resulting from Kiuchi's purchasing of an escort, forced him off the baseball team and into an office job, leading to his misogynistic desires. Nagisa, Lufel, and Motoha are able to defeat Shadow Kiuchi and steal his treasure, resulting in Kiuchi turning himself in to the police. As Kiuchi was brought in, Nagisa began to experience weird visions of the future, showing what would have happened had they failed to stop Kiuchi's crimes.

Resolving to reclaim the desires of the masses, the trio works together as the Phantom Thieves, meeting new allies and fighting against more nefarious palace rulers. As the Phantom Thieves reclaim desires and change the target's hearts, Nagisa's visions became more frequent and extreme, implying that not everything is what it seems.

== Development ==
Perfect World Games first teased the project with a trailer in April 2021. Titled Code Name: X, it was claimed to be the first mobile entry in a “famous Japanese console game series” that has sold over 10 million copies worldwide. The footage was noted to feature the aesthetic and music reminiscent of Persona 5, but the ties to the Persona series were not officially confirmed. The connection was later discovered through image filenames on the website and the binary code at the end of the trailer, which was translated to Persona 5X.

Persona 5: The Phantom X was developed by Black Wings Game Studio, a subsidiary of Perfect World, under the supervision of the series developer P-Studio (Atlus) and their parent company Sega. The Persona staff provided input on the game's story and setting, and directly presented ideas regarding the characterization of the Phantom Thieves, which were then turned into original characters by Black Wings staff.

The general producer of the Persona series Kazuhisa Wada worked as the supervisor of the project. The business producer Yohsuke Uda served as the game's producer from the Atlus side, and scenario planner Yusuke Nitta, who previously worked on Persona 5 Royal, Persona 5 Strikers and Persona 5 Tactica, is credited as the development director and lead scenario planner.

=== Music ===
The opening theme, "Ambitions and Visions", was composed by Ryota Kozuka of Atlus Sound Team, with lyrics by Jasmine Webb. According to sound director Qing Yao, it helped to define the musical style of the game, "inheriting the punk and rock" of the original game and "expanding into a fast tempo J-pop direction." The rest of the music was created in-house by BlackWings Audio Station staff, with song lyrics by AkimR. After completing the basic composition and arrangement, the music was sent to supervisors at Atlus for checks and edits. When the result satisfied both parties, Atlus scheduled recordings with Persona 5 vocalist Lyn. Original music from Persona 5 and Persona 3 Reload by Shoji Meguro was included. The first volume of the soundtrack, containing 21 tracks, was released on April 12, 2024.

== Release ==
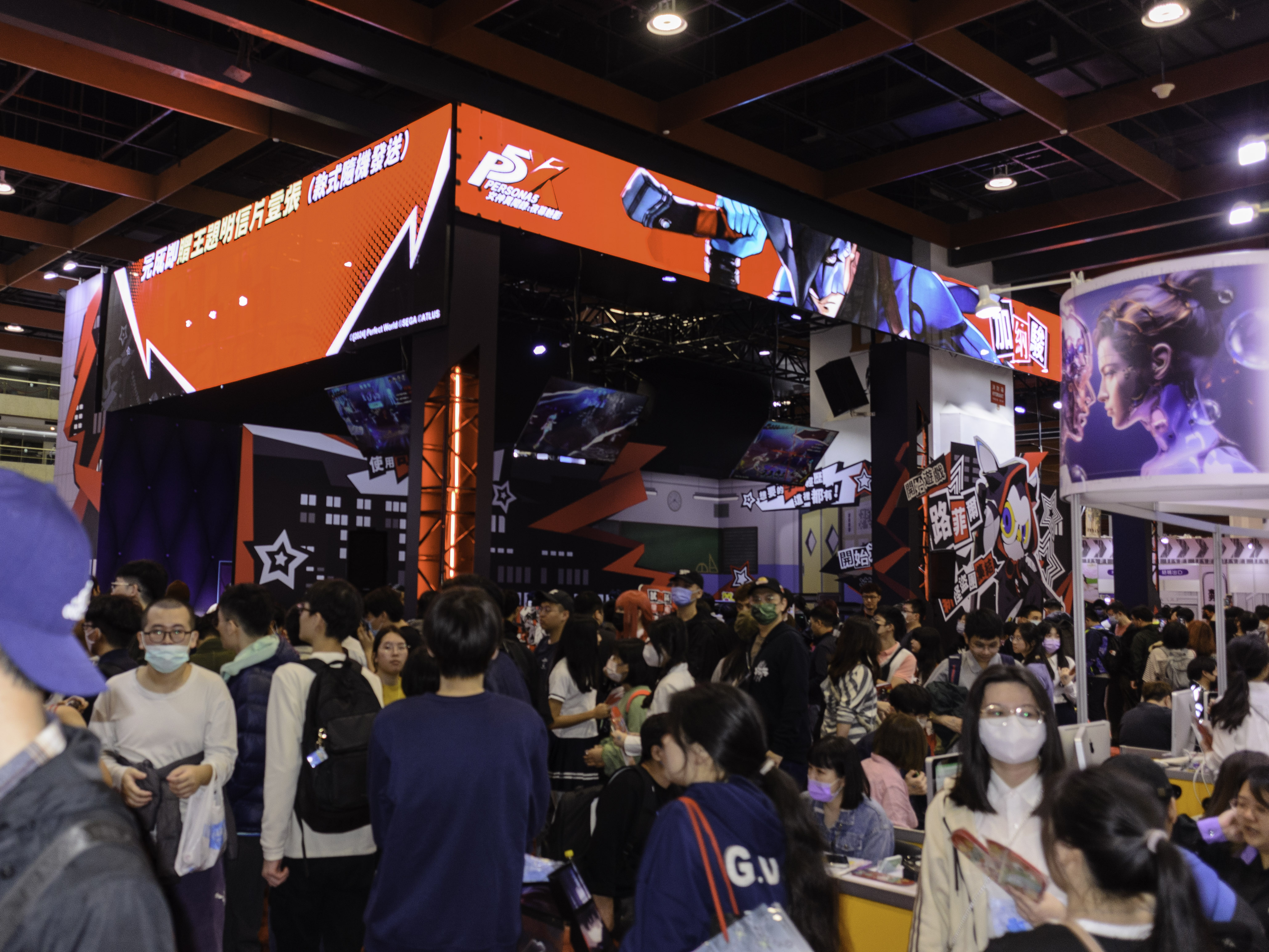
Persona 5: The Phantom X being promoted at the 2024 Taipei International Comics & Animation Festival

The game was revealed for Android and iOS on March 16, 2023. Perfect World operates the game in China. The first small-scale closed beta test, titled 'Infiltration Test', was held shortly after the announcement from March 29 to March 31, 2023. While Perfect World did not announce the PC version at the time, the beta was available for Windows, in addition to Android. The second, 'Awakening Test', ran from August 18 to August 31, 2023. The final closed beta test, 'Heart Stealing Test', was held from January 16 to January 30, 2024.

An open beta test began on April 12, 2024, in mainland China, and official launch on April 18, 2024, in Taiwan, Hong Kong, Macau, and South Korea.

As part of their Tokyo Game Show presentation in September 2024, Atlus announced that they will release Persona 5: The Phantom X in Japan, stating it will be available on Android, iOS, Steam and Google Play Games. A closed beta test was held from November 29 to December 5, 2024. The game was launched in Japan and other territories on June 26, 2025, with preload made available a day before the release. In Southeast Asia, the game was released on July 3, 2025.

== Reception ==
Reception

Aggregate score
Aggregator	Score
OpenCritic	67% recommend

At launch, Persona 5: The Phantom X received positive reviews. Several critics positively noted that elements of Persona 5: The Phantom X, including its battle mechanics, graphics, and story, closely resembled those of the original Persona 5. Sarah Thwaites of IGN wrote that Persona 5: The Phantom X felt "like an uncanny reflection of Persona 5".

The game's writing was met with mixed reception. Thwaites and Vice writer Brent Koepp praised the main cast of characters. However, the first antagonist, Kiuchi (nicknamed the Subway Slammer) was mocked by players through memes. Connor Makar of Eurogamer noted that while Kiuchi was based on real cases of men ramming into others in Japan, Kiuchi stating "the whole Subway is mine for the Slammin'" made it difficult to take him seriously. Persona 5: The Phantom X's Director Yusuke Nitta also criticized Kiuchi and said that the writer behind Kiuchi was no longer on the development team.

The global version of the game initially received negative reviews from players due to changes to the rewards that are deemed inferior compared to the Chinese version. The devs has since responded to by promising more rewards and rectifying reward discrepancies moving forward

The game was nominated for Best Mobile Game at The Game Awards 2025, and won Mobile Game of the Year at the 29th Annual D.I.C.E. Awards.
