= Other specified paraphilic disorder =

Psychiatric diagnosis

Other specified paraphilic disorder is the term used by the fifth edition of the Diagnostic and Statistical Manual of Mental Disorders (DSM-5) to refer to any of the many other paraphilic disorders that are not explicitly named in the manual. Along with unspecified paraphilic disorder, it replaced the DSM-IV-TR category paraphilia not otherwise specified (PNOS). In the revised DSM-5-TR published in 2022 no changes have been made regarding Other specified paraphilic disorder.

Examples listed by the DSM-5 are telephone scatologia (sexual arousal to obscene phone calls), necrophilia (corpses), zoophilia (animals), coprophilia (feces), klismaphilia (enemas), and urophilia (urine). Partialism was considered a Paraphilia NOS in the DSM-IV, but was subsumed into fetishistic disorder by the DSM-5. In order to be diagnosable, the interest must be recurrent and intense, present for at least six months, and cause marked distress or impairment in important areas of functioning. When a specific paraphilic disorder cannot be identified or the clinician chooses not to specify it for some other reason, the unspecified paraphilic disorder diagnosis may be used instead.

== See also ==
- Courtship disorder
- Erotic target location error
- List of paraphilias
