= Frotteurism =

Paraphilic interest in rubbing

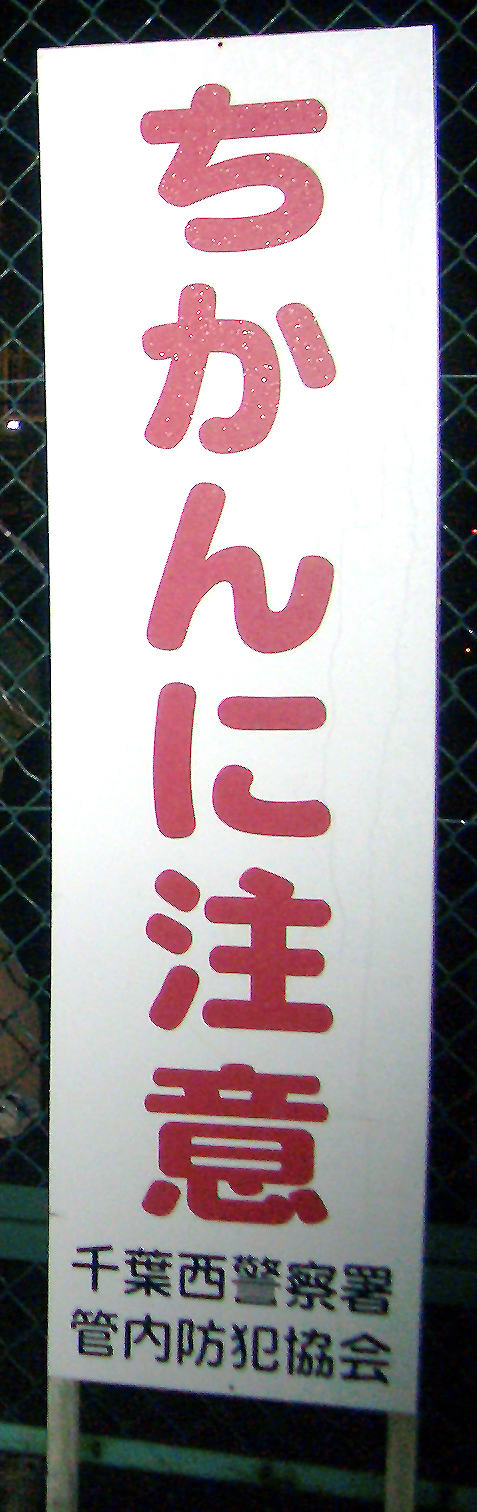
A sign outside of a bicycle parking lot in Chiba, Japan, warns "Beware of Chikan"

Frotteurism is a paraphilic interest in rubbing, usually one's pelvic area or erect penis, against a non-consenting person for sexual pleasure. It may involve touching any part of the body, including the genital area. A person who practices frotteuristic acts is known as a frotteur.

Toucherism is sexual arousal based on grabbing or rubbing one's hands against an unexpecting (and non-consenting) person. It usually involves touching breasts, buttocks or genital areas, often while quickly walking across the victim's path. Some psychologists consider toucherism a manifestation of frotteurism, while others distinguish the two. In clinical medicine, treatment of frotteuristic disorder involves cognitive behavioral therapy coupled with the administration of an selective serotonin reuptake inhibitor.

== Etymology and history ==
Frotteuristic acts were probably first interpreted as signs of a psychological disorder by French psychiatrist Valentin Magnan, who described three acts of "frottage" in an 1890 study. "Frottage" derives from the French verb frotter, meaning "to rub". Frotteur is a French noun literally meaning "one who rubs". It was popularized by German sexologist Richard von Krafft-Ebing in his book Psychopathia Sexualis, borrowing from Magnan's French terminology. Clifford Allen later coined frotteurism in his 1969 textbook of sexual disorders.

The Diagnostic and Statistical Manual of Mental Disorders called this sexual disorder by the name frottage until the third edition (DSM III-R), but changed to frotteurism in the fourth edition, and now uses frotteuristic disorder in the fifth edition. Nevertheless, the term frottage still remains in some law codes where it is synonymous with the term frotteurism.

== Symptoms and classification ==
The professional handbook of the American Psychiatric Association (APA), the Diagnostic and Statistical Manual of Mental Disorders, fifth edition, lists the following diagnostic criteria for frotteuristic disorder.

- Over a period of at least 6 months, recurrent and intense sexual arousal from touching or rubbing against a nonconsenting person, as manifested by fantasies, urges, or behaviors.
- The individual has acted on these sexual urges with a nonconsenting person, or the sexual urges or fantasies cause clinically significant distress or impairment in social, occupational, or other important areas of functioning.

If the individual has not acted on their interest and experiences no distress or impairment, they are considered to have a frotteuristic sexual interest, but not frotteuristic disorder. Some sexologists distinguish between frotteurism (as pelvic rubbing) and toucherism (as groping with hands), but the DSM does not. Sexologist Kurt Freund described frotteurism and toucherism as courtship disorders that occur at the tactile stage of human courtship.

== Etiology ==
There is no consensus as to the reason for why one would partake in frotteurism but there are many theories. Such theories include neurophysiologic abnormalities, mental disorders, psycho-social factors and sexual excitement. Brain injuries and monoamine pathway abnormalities have been proposed as neurophysiological factors contributing to frotteurism as they can affect dopamine and serotonin pathways, which are associated with impulse control and sexual behaviors. Some comorbid mental disorders that can be associated with frotteurism are social anxiety, substance abuse, and a presence of other paraphilia symptoms. As for psycho-social factors, abnormal sexual stimuli growing up, sexual abuse, or poor parenting have been proposed as contributing factors. This can be seen with a theory that describes it as a way to fantasize the perpetrator and the victim as having an exclusive and caring relationship.

== Diagnosis ==
In order to determine if someone is suffering from frotteuristic disorder, the individual goes through a set of clinical interviews and diagnostic criteria that are based on DSM-5. In some cases, laboratory workup and imaging are ordered to exclude other possible causes. Interviewing the individual is used to determine their history, such as any family history, sexual abuse, psychiatric disorders, chronic physical illness, or substance abuse. In younger individuals, a clinician may gather information about their academic performance, family dynamics, and any other home or developmental factors that may contribute to behavioral difficulties.

== Prevalence and legality ==
The prevalence of frotteurism is unknown. The DSM estimates that 10–14% of men seen in clinical settings for paraphilias or hypersexuality have frotteuristic disorder, indicating that the population prevalence is lower. However, frotteuristic acts, as opposed to frotteuristic disorder, may occur in up to 30% of men in the general population. The majority of frotteurs are male and the majority of victims are female, although female on male, female on female, and male on male frotteurs exist. This activity is often done in circumstances where the victim cannot easily respond, in a public place such as a crowded train or concert. Marco Vassi's story "Subway Dick" is an example of such acts in a train.

Usually, such nonconsensual sexual contact is viewed as a criminal offense: a form of sexual assault albeit often classified as a misdemeanor with minor legal penalties. Conviction may result in a sentence or psychiatric treatment.

== See also ==
- Eve teasing
- Forcible touching
- Groping
- Masturbation
- Non-penetrative sex
- Sexual harassment
- Butsukari otoko
