= Paraphilic coercive disorder =

Type of paraphilia

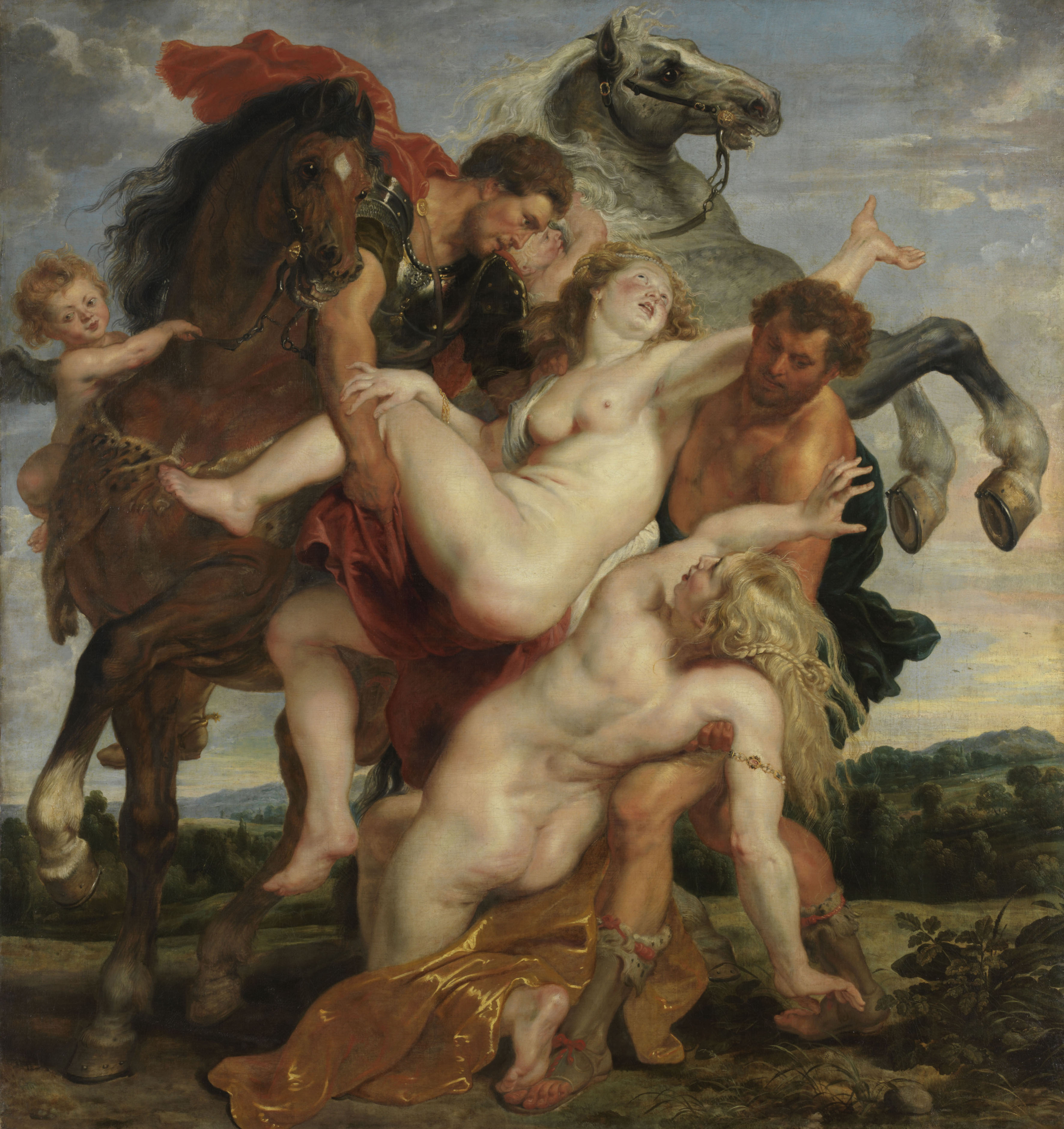
Peter Paul Rubens - The Rape of the Daughters of Leucippus

Paraphilic coercive disorder, also paraphilic rape, is a paraphilia in which sexual arousal is dependent on, or is responsive to, the act of sexually assaulting a nonconsenting person, especially a stranger.

In Greek, the disorder is known as biastophilia (from biastes, "rapist" + -philia) and in Latin raptophilia (from Latin rapere, "to seize"). Some dictionaries consider the terms synonymous, while others distinguish raptophilia as the paraphilia in which sexual arousal is responsive to actually raping the victim.

== Type of sexual sadism ==
The source of the arousal in these paraphilias is the victim's terrified resistance to the assault, and in this respect it is considered to be a milder variation of sexual sadism. Some scholar propose that paraphilic coercive disorders fall along an "agonistic continuum" with sexual sadism at the continuum's most extreme end.

== Inclusion as diagnosis in DSM and ICD ==
Paraphilic coercive disorder was proposed but rejected for inclusion in the Diagnostic and Statistical Manual of Mental Disorders, Fifth Edition. The diagnosis had also been rejected, under the name paraphilic rapism, for the DSM-III-R. The diagnosis has been included, however, in the International Classification of Diseases as "other paraphilic disorder involving non-consenting individuals."

It has been criticized because of the difficulty of reliably distinguishing between paraphilic rapists and non-paraphilic rapists. A similar diagnosis has been made under the term other specified paraphilic disorder, non-consent and used in sexually violent predator civil commitment proceedings.

== Definition in Czechoslovakia ==
A standard concept in Czechoslovak sexology is pathologic sexual aggressivity instead. This term is strongly distinguished from sadism. This disorder is understood as a coordination anomaly of the sexual motivation system (SMS), a "courtship disorder" according to Kurt Freund or displacement paraphilia by John Money, or a missing segment of SMS.

== See also ==
- Penile plethysmograph#Biastophilia
- Rape fantasy
- Serial rape
