= Chikan (body contact) =

Japanese term referring to sexual harassment

A typical form of chikan

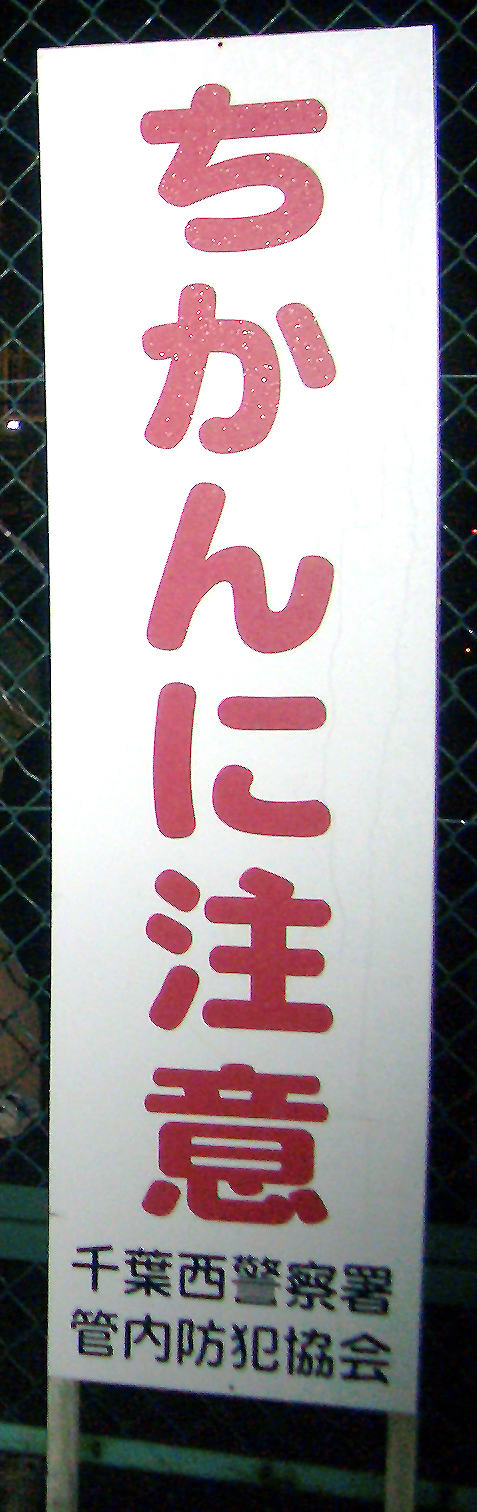
A sign outside of a bicycle parking lot in Chiba, Japan, warns "Beware of Chikan!"

Chikan (痴漢, チカン, or ちかん) is a Japanese term for sexual harassment or other obscene acts conducted against the victim's will, or a person who commits such an act. The term is frequently used to describe men who take advantage of the crowded conditions on the public transit systems to sexually grope people. While the term is not defined in the Japanese legal system, vernacular use describes acts that violate several laws. The corresponding neologism referring to female molesters is chijo.

In clinical psychology, the desire is called frotteurism. While women on crowded trains in Japan are the most frequent targets of chikan, sexual predators in Japan can take advantage of people in other situations as well. One such situation (warned against in the sign pictured) is bicycle parking lots, where a molester will wait until a victim is bent over, unlocking their bicycle lock, and then grope them from behind. Chikan often features in Japanese pornography, along with other non-consensual themes. As part of the effort to combat chikan, some railway companies have designated women-only passenger cars.

In fiscal year 2024, there were 2,254 arrests for molestation, of which 1,321 were in stations and trains, and 1,203 arrests for voyeurism, including 1,000 on escalators and stairs in stations. Victims of molestation may be disinclined from reporting their victimization, psychologically unable to ride the train, and/or suffer other ongoing trauma consequences.

== Description ==
Chikan is the act of touching or hugging someone on a train, in an elevator, or on a street at night, or of exhibitionism of the lower half of one's body and enjoying seeing the other person's reaction, which is a sex crime. Basically meaning non-lethal sexual assault, sexual violence, and the person who commits it.

BBC News reports that the word chikan has spread around the world, so much so that foreign molestation and voyeurism groups are targeting Japanese trains.

The British government has posted for its citizens traveling to Japan, “Female passengers travelling on commuter trains have experienced inappropriate behaviour. This includes touching and upskirting – taking photos or videos from below when women walk or stand nearby.” The travel advisory posted by the Canadian government states, "Inappropriate physical contact may occur on busy subways and trains."

More than half of such crimes occur on trains. Railway companies encourage passengers to use the emergency alert system without hesitation if groping occurs. In some cases, perpetrators who flee onto train tracks are arrested for both the (crime of) indecent assault and obstruction of business by force. Some repeat offenders have also been found traveling back and forth in crowded cars, committing both groping and fare evasion.

Molestation has also been reported at live music venues, prompting some organizers to introduce gender-segregated areas to prevent such incidents.

== History ==
In 2010 Japanese police recommended squatting to prevent further harm, raising the voice to attract attention, and calling 110. The Metropolitan Police Department has a system that can receive video if a 110 is made, depending on the situation. It is also recommended to drop an item or flash a smartphone to attract attention. This crime often targets younger individuals, with many victims experiencing it first during middle or high school.

In October 2017, a woman living in France published a novel titled TCHIKAN, based on her experiences of being groped during her junior high school years in Japan. She said that the sexual violence she endured while commuting to school caused severe psychological distress, leading to self-harm and suicidal thoughts.

In March 2023, the government announced a "Policy Package to Eradicate Groping," which included more detailed investigations and analysis of such crimes, guidance to prevent repeat offenses, promotion of the national consultation hotline "#8103," and accommodations for students who are late or absent from school or exams due to victimization. The summary clearly stated: "Groping is a serious crime. It is an act that tramples on personal dignity and must never be tolerated".

Since July 2023, any non-consensual physical contact has been criminalized as a (crime of) indecent assault, and arrests have resulted from emergency calls placed from trains.

During the January exam season, a trend of social media posts inciting sexual violence against test-takers—referred to as "Chikan Chance Day"—prompted the Minister of Gender Equality to announce in January 2024 that victims could take makeup exams and dress casually. The minister also urged victims to speak up without hesitation. In March 2024, a man was referred to prosecutors for repeatedly posting inciting messages on social media despite police warnings. Some victims reported being so shaken by being groped on the way to exams that they failed and had to repeat a year.

In 2025, a woman who had suffered habitual molestation from her second day in high school created a “Chikan Prevention Badge". The organization distributing these badges, the “Chikan Prevention Action Center,” publishes key facts and precautions about groping specifically for students.

== Incidents ==
On the Osaka Metro Midosuji Line, an 18-year-old girl was raped on a platform in 2019 as a result of escalating molestation on the train. On this train line, there was also a rape case in 1988 due to an accusation of molestation and recrimination.

In April 2023, there was an incident on the JR Saikyo Line. A woman had her underwear lowered by a group of men and was touched on the lower half of her body. The man (38) fled the tracks, but was arrested six months later based on security camera footage.

=== Male victimization ===
Boxer Kenshiro Teraji was molested by a middle-aged man in May 2022. Teraji is the light flyweight champion of the World Boxing Council, but he still had difficulty raising his voice or resisting due to fear and shame. Based on this experience, he said that he realized that female victims were more scared than he had thought, and requested that people offer support to victims and stop teasing them or asking why they did not resist or raise their voices.

In May 2023, two men, an organization employee (56) and a part-time worker (44), were arrested based on analysis of security camera images after they conspired to pinch a high school boy (16) and touch his chest and put their hands in his underwear for several minutes on a February night in a train traveling on the JR Saikyo Line from Shinjuku Station. The victim was reportedly so shocked that he could no longer use the train line. The perpetrator was a habitual molester.

== Statistics ==
The National Police Agency reports that about 2,000 to 3,000 chikans are arrested each year.

According to the National Police Agency's survey on crime victimization in 2024, 51.3% of sexual victims do not consult anyone about their sexual victimization. In addition, “compensation from the perpetrator” only happens in 0.8% of cases.

Molestation, like other sex crimes, has a high dark count. For example, according to a survey conducted by the Center for the Deterrence of Molestation Activities, 3% of molestation victims reported the crime. In addition, according to data conducted by the National Police Agency, 89.1% of those who were victims of molestation in the past year did not report or consult with the police.

=== Male victimization ===
NHK's survey of 292 male victims of sexual assault found that the majority of victims were in their 20s, and about 70% had not consulted anyone. The majority were physical contact, with “touched on the body over clothing” (195 respondents) and “directly touched on the body” (142 respondents). Seventy percent of the perpetrators were male, 16.4% were female, and 10% were multiple perpetrators. The perpetrators said that nearly 60% of them were acquaintances, with supervisors, seniors, and teachers also prominent.

== See also ==
- Butsukari otoko
- Frotteurism
- "Otto Chikan!"
- Saikyō Line
