= Unspecified paraphilic disorder =

Psychiatric diagnosis

Unspecified paraphilic disorder is a DSM-5 category of paraphilic disorders that is used when a specified paraphilic disorder cannot be identified or the clinician chooses not to specify it for some other reason. Along with other specified paraphilic disorder, it replaced the DSM-IV-TR category of paraphilia not otherwise specified (PNOS).

== See also ==
- List of paraphilias
