= Courtship disorder =

Theoretical construct in sexology

Courtship disorder is a theoretical construct in sexology developed by Kurt Freund in which a certain set of paraphilias are seen as specific instances of anomalous courtship instincts in humans. The specific paraphilias are biastophilia (paraphilic rape), exhibitionism, frotteurism, telephone scatologia, and voyeurism. According to the courtship disorder hypothesis, there is a species-typical courtship process in humans consisting of four phases, and anomalies in different phases result in one of these paraphilic sexual interests. According to the theory, instead of being independent paraphilias, these sexual interests are individual symptoms of a single underlying disorder.

== Courtship disorder hypothesis ==
According to the courtship disorder hypothesis, there is a species-typical courtship process in humans consisting of four phases. These phases are: "(1) looking for and appraising potential sexual partners; (2) pretactile interaction with those partners, such as by smiling at and talking to them; (3) tactile interaction with them, such as by embracing or petting; (4) and then sexual intercourse."

The associations between these phases and these paraphilias were first outlined by Kurt Freund, the originator of the theory: A disturbance of the search phase of courtship manifests as voyeurism, a disturbance of the pretactile interaction phase manifests as exhibitionism or telephone scatologia, a disturbance of the tactile interaction phase manifests as toucheurism or frotteurism, and the absence of the courtship behavior phases manifests as paraphilic rape (i.e., biastophilia). According to Freund, these paraphilias "can be conceptualized as a preference for a pattern of behavior or erotic fantasy in which one of these four phases of sexual interaction is intensified and distorted to such an extent that it appears to be a caricature of the normal, while the remaining phases are either omitted entirely or are retained only in a vestigial way."

Freund noted that troilism (a paraphilia for observing one's sexual/romantic partner sexually interacting with a third party, usually unbeknownst to the third party) might also be a courtship disorder, troilism being a variant of voyeurism.

Appropriate behaviors depend on the social and cultural context, including time and place. Some behaviors that are unacceptable under most circumstances, such as public nudity or sexual contact between dancers, may be accepted or even encouraged during celebrations like Carnival or Mardi Gras. Where such cultural festivals alter normative courtship behaviors, the signs of courtship disorder may be masked or altered.

== Evidence and acceptance of the theory ==
Paraphilias within the Courtship Disorder spectrum co-occur with each other more frequently than with paraphilias outside the courtship disorder spectrum. The courtship disorder model offers an underlying common cause for these paraphilias in men to explain this co-occurrence.

Courtship disorder is widely cited by sexologists and forensic scientists as one of the predominant models of the paraphilias. Murphy and Page wrote that "The 'Courtship Disorder Theory' of Freund is one of the only theories specific to exhibitionism." According to Lavin (2008), "Freund's theory, more than the others, makes it clear that the ordering of activities ... has clinical significance."

Another theoretically based taxonomy of the paraphilias was proposed by John Money, who described the range of paraphilic interests as lovemaps.

== See also ==
- John Hinckley Jr.
