= Sexual sadism disorder =

Paraphilia in which a subject derives gratification from inflicting pain

- Other names: Sexual sadism, sadistic sex, non-consensual sadomasochism
- Specialty: Psychology, psychiatry, clinical psychology
- Complications: Sexual torture, rape, homicide, mutilation
- Differential diagnosis: Rape, sexual coercion, sexual grooming, paraphilia, prostitution, sadomasochism, conduct disorder, torture, sexual bullying, sexual abuse, genital mutilation, pornography, child pornography, sexual addiction, pornography addiction

Sexual sadism disorder is the condition of experiencing sexual arousal in response to the pain, suffering or humiliation of other people. Several other terms are used to describe the condition, and it may overlap with other conditions that involve inflicting pain. It is distinct from situations in which consenting individuals use mild or simulated pain or humiliation for sexual excitement. The words sadism and sadist are derived from the French writer and libertine Marquis de Sade, who wrote several novels depicting sexualized torture and violence.

== Related terms and conditions ==
=== Current terminology ===
Sexual sadism disorder is the term employed by the current version of the Diagnostic and Statistical Manual (DSM-5) of the American Psychiatric Association. It refers to the "recurrent and intense sexual arousal from the physical or psychological suffering of another person, as manifested by fantasies, urges, or behaviors" (p. 696). It is classified as one of the paraphilias, called an "algolagnic disorder" (p. 685), which is one of the "anomalous activity preferences" (p. 685). The formal diagnosis of Sexual Sadism Disorder would apply if the individual has acted on these urges with a non-consenting person or if the urges cause significant distress to the individual.

Coercive sexual sadism disorder is the term used by the current version of the International Classification of Diseases (ICD-11). The diagnosis requires a pattern of sexual arousal that is directed at non-consenting persons. The patient must also have either acted on these thoughts or be markedly distressed by them. Consensual sadism and masochism are specifically excluded from the diagnosis. According to the respective working group, consensual arousal patterns as such do not represent mental disorders, and have been therefore deleted from the classifications of disorders.

Paraphilic coercive disorder refers to the preference for non-consenting over consenting sexual partners. It differs from sexual sadism disorder in that although the individual with this disorder may inflict pain or threats of pain in order to gain the compliance of the victim, the infliction of pain is not the individual's actual goal. The condition is typically described as a paraphilia and continues to undergo research, but does not appear in the current DSM or ICD. Alternate terms for the condition have included Biastophilia, Coercive Paraphilic Disorder, and Preferential Rape.

BDSM or "bondage/discipline dominance/submission sadomasochism" is a colloquial term referring to the subculture of individuals who willingly engage in consenting forms of mild or simulated pain or humiliation. It is not currently a diagnosable condition in either the DSM or ICD system. Alternative terms have included Bondage and Discipline (B&D), Domination and Submission (D&S), and Sadism and Masochism (S&M). In scientific research, this sexual preference has also been called the hyperdominance pattern of sexual behavior. Unlike individuals with sexual sadism disorder or paraphilic coercive disorder, individuals with hyperdominance seek to provoke pleasure in their partner(s) with pain, humiliation, or both.

=== Previous terminology ===
Sadomasochism appeared in the previous version of the International Classification of Diseases (ICD-10) of the World Health Organization. It refers to the "preference for sexual activity that involves bondage or the infliction of pain or humiliation" (p. 172), and divides sadomasochism into sadism and masochism according to whether the individual prefers to be the provider or recipient of it. The ICD-10 specifies that mild forms of sadomasochism "are commonly used to enhance otherwise normal sexual activity" (p. 172), and that the diagnosis would apply only if the behavior is preferred or required for sexual gratification. The condition is classified as one of the disorders of sexual preference, which includes the paraphilias (p. 170).

Sexual sadism is the term previously employed by the DSM-III-R, DSM-IV, and DSM-IV-TR, where it was classified as a paraphilia. In these versions of the DSM, sexual sadism pertained only to the infliction of real (not simulated) suffering (p. 530). The condition was renamed sexual sadism disorder in DSM-5.

Sexual sadism was the term employed in the DSM-III, classifying the condition as a paraphilia. The DSM-III noted that "the imagery in a Paraphilia, such as simulated bondage, may be playful and harmless and acted out with a mutually consenting partner [...] In more extreme form, paraphilic imagery is acted out with a nonconsenting partner, and is noxious and injurious to the partner" (p. 267). In DSM-III, sexual sadism could be diagnosed if the individual:

1. repeatedly and intentionally inflicted suffering on a nonconsenting person, to experience sexual excitement
2. repeatedly or exclusively preferred simulated or mild suffering with a consenting sexual partner
3. employs extensive, permanent, or potentially fatal suffering to achieve sexual excitement, regardless of the consent of the other person.

Sadism was the term employed by the DSM-II. In that manual, the condition was classified as a sexual deviation, which was used to describe "individuals whose sexual interests are directed primarily toward […] coitus performed under bizarre circumstances" (p. 44). The term "paraphilia" did not exist in the DSM-II, and diagnoses did not have specific criteria until DSM-III.

Sexual sadism was the phrase mentioned in DSM-I as one of the sexual deviations (p. 39), but neither it (nor any of the other sexual deviations) received a specific label or diagnostic criteria. The term paraphilia did not exist in the DSM-II, and diagnoses did not have specific criteria until DSM-III.

Sadistic personality disorder does not actually refer to any sexual interest, and instead refers to the pervasive disregard for the well-being of other people. It is usually associated with a history of violence and criminality (which can include, but is not limited to sexual crimes).

== Features ==
With paraphilic coercive disorder, the individual employs enough force to subdue a victim, but with sexual sadism disorder, the individual often continues to inflict harm regardless of the compliance of the victim, which sometimes escalates not only to the death of the victim, but also to the mutilation of the body. What is experienced by the sadist as sexual does not always appear obviously sexual to non-sadists: sadistic rapes do not necessarily include penile penetration of the victim. In a survey of offenses, 77% of cases included sexual bondage, 73% included anal rape, 60% included blunt force trauma, 57% included vaginal rape, and 40% included penetration of the victim by a foreign object. In 40% of cases, the offender kept a personal item of the victim as a souvenir.

On personality testing, sadistic rapists apprehended by law enforcement have shown elevated traits of impulsivity, hypersexuality, callousness, and psychopathy. Psychologists Park Dietz, Robert R. Hazelwood, and Janet Warren have argued that criminal sexual sadists differ from non-offending sexual sadists in levels of empathy, not in the severity of their sadism.

Although there appears to be a continuum of severity from mild (hyperdominance or BDSM) to moderate (paraphilic coercive disorder) to severe (sexual sadism disorder), it is unclear if they are genuinely related or only appear related superficially. The Agonistic Continuum Scale (TACS) measures this proposed continuum of sexual sadism as a dimensional construct, with four subscales measuring four facets of sexual sadism: Coercion and Power, Bondage and Humiliation, Physical Violence, and Killing.

Very little is known about how sexual sadism disorder develops. A 2022 systematic review theorized that sexual sadism, alongside other "deviant" sexual interests, originates from an interplay of various factors, including excitation transfer between emotions and sexual arousal, classical and operant conditioning, problems with “normative” sexuality, and social learning.

Most of the people diagnosed with sexual sadism disorder come to the attention of authorities by committing sexually motivated crimes. Surveys have also been conducted to include people who are interested in only mild and consensual forms of sexual pain/humiliation (BDSM).

Most people with full-blown sexual sadism disorder are male, whereas the sex ratio of people interested in BDSM is closer to 2:1 male-to-female.

People with sexual sadism disorder are at an elevated likelihood of having other paraphilic sexual interests.

== See also ==
- Sexual masochism disorder
- Sadomasochism
- Marquis de Sade, after whom sadism is named
- Leopold von Sacher-Masoch, after whom masochism is named
- Biastophilia, the paraphilia for rape
- Lust murder
- Sadistic personality disorder
- Zoosadism, equivalent paraphilia for non-human animals
