= Obscene phone call =

Unsolicited telephone call

An obscene phone call is an unsolicited telephone call where a person uses profane and/or sexual language to interact with someone who may be known to them or may be a complete stranger. Making obscene telephone calls for sexual arousal or other sexual pleasure is known as telephone scatologia and is considered a form of exhibitionism.

== Status as a paraphilia ==
Telephone scatologia is usually classed as a paraphilia from a psychiatric viewpoint. It is in the DSM-5 as an other specified paraphilic disorder. Related psychiatric terms (such as coprophilia) were coined in Australia, the United States, and Germany; most of the pertinent literature is North American. From the viewpoint of the recipient of the calls, obscene calls may be considered to be a form of sexual harassment, stalking, or both.

== Legal consequences ==
In some U.S. states, making obscene telephone calls is a Class 1 Misdemeanor. In the United Kingdom, obscene phone calls are punishable by a fine of up to £5,000 or up to six months in prison under the Criminal Justice and Public Order Act 1994.

== See also ==
- Courtship disorder
- Dirty talk
- Phone sex
- Prank call
- Sexual harassment
- Strip search phone call scam
