= Butsukari otoko =

Japanese term for assault by force in a crowded space

Butsukari otoko (Japanese: ぶつかり男; lit. 'bumping man') is a Japanese term that refers to a person who deliberately collides with passersby in crowded public places, such as train stations. Perpetrators described as butsukari otoko are often men in their forties or older, and it has been reported that while targets may include men, smaller women are more frequently targeted.

In May 2018, a video of a butsukari otoko at Shinjuku Station was disseminated on Twitter, YouTube, etc. In the wake of this, similar victim reports occurred. JR East, in response, labelled such attacks as disruptive behaviour and increased monitoring by security guards and station staff.

The motives of individuals described as butsukari otoko have been speculated to include venting frustrations arising from stressful social lives, and some perpetrators have intentionally collided with women in an attempt to touch their breasts.

== Etymology ==
Butsukari otoko have been alternatively called takkuru otoko (タックル男, 'tackle men'), taiatari otoko (体当たり男, 'ramming men') and butsukari ojisan (ぶつかりおじさん, 'bumping old men').

== Types ==
According to a special feature on Morning Show which aired in May 2018, butsukari otoko are mainly classified into 5 patterns.

- A butsukari otoko of the "following type" follows a woman that he has targeted and bumps into her.
- A butsukari otoko of the "pick-a-fight" type stands firm with his feet set apart when a woman turns around.
- A butsukari otoko of the "my-own-way type" ignores the flow of people.
- A butsukari otoko of the "attacking type" sticks his leg out, among other actions.
- A butsukari otoko of the "slugger type" punches unsuspecting women in the eye.

== Gender variations ==
=== Butsukari onna ===
While the term butsukari otoko specifically refers to men, intentional bumping is increasingly documented as a gender-neutral form of physical harassment or assault in Japan. Social discourse and media reports have used the term butsukari onna (ぶつかり女, "bumping woman") to describe female perpetrators of similar behavior.

In February 2026, a high-profile incident occurred at Shibuya Crossing in Tokyo, where a woman was filmed intentionally shoving a young girl to the ground before walking away. This incident, which involved a Taiwanese family on vacation, has sparked significant international outrage and renewed calls for stricter enforcement against intentional bumping as a public safety issue rather than a social nuisance.

== Arrests ==
- September 26, 2019, Nijūbashimae Station, 49-year-old man, three women injured.
- July 10, 2020, Kamata Station, 45-year-old man, six women harmed.

== Law ==
In the event that they deliberately launched a ramming attack against passers-by, etc., there is a possibility that they will be charged with the following crimes.

- Battery – For the act of ramming itself.
- Bodily harm – In cases where they have wounded the other party.
- Anti-nuisance ordinance violation – In cases where molestation is the purpose.
- Deception – In cases where they pretended that their smartphones, glasses, laptops, tablet devices, luxury watches and luxury bags were damaged or got scratched, or their brand-name luxury suits and coats got a stain or were torn, pressed them for a cleaning fee, repair bill, compensation for items and payment of settlement money, and swindled them out of their cash.

In addition, there are also cases where civil claims for compensation for damages are possible. Moreover, in the event that a pregnant woman had suffered an injury, bodily harm charges can also be applied for the fetus.

== See also ==
- Violence against women
- Harassment
- Chikan (body contact)
- Staged crash
