= Hole in the Wall =

Hole in the Wall, or variants, may refer to:

== Places ==
=== Geological features ===
- Burrow Beach, a beach in County Dublin, Ireland, also known as Hole-in-the-Wall Beach
- Hole-in-the-Wall (Wyoming), a mountain pass in Big Horn Mountains, US, known as an outlaw hangout in the American Wild West
- Hole-in-the-Wall, a geologic formation in Mojave National Preserve, California, US
- Hole-in-the-Wall (Eastern Cape), an natural arch in South Africa
- Hole-in-the-Wall Provincial Park, British Columbia, Canada
- Hole-in-the-Wall, a geologic formation on Grand Manan Island, New Brunswick, Canada
- Hole-in-the-Wall, a rock arch at Rialto Beach, Washington, US
- Hole in the Wall, a cave in Mount Cory (Alberta), Canada
- Hole-in-the-wall, a site of the lighthouse in Abaco Islands, The Bahamas

=== Settlements ===
- Hole-in-the-Wall, Herefordshire, a settlement in England
- Hole-in-the-Wall, Seaham Harbour, a harbour in County Durham, England

== Pubs and restaurants ==
- Hole In The Wall, the name of several very small pubs
- Hole-in-the-Wall (saloon), a 19th century saloon in New York City, US
- The Hole in the Wall, Bodmin, a pub in Cornwall, England
- Hole in the Wall, Sliema, a restaurant and bar in Malta
- Hole in t'Wall, a nickname of New Hall Inn, Bowness on Windermere, England

== Arts and entertainment ==
=== Film ===
- The Hole in the Wall (1921 film), an American silent film
- The Hole in the Wall (1929 film), a remake of the 1921 film
- A Hole in the Wall (1930 film), a French comedy
- A Hole in the Wall (1950 film), a French comedy
- A Hole in the Wall (1982 film), an Argentine film
- Hole in the Wall (2016 film), a South African drama

=== Music ===
- "Hole in the Wall", a 1966 album and its title song by The Packers
- Hole in the Wall (band), a Norwegian country-rock band
- "Hole in the Wall", a song by Béla Fleck and the Flecktones from the 1991 album Flight of the Cosmic Hippo
- "A Hole in the Wall", a song by KMFDM from the 1993 album Angst (KMFDM album)

=== Television ===
- Brain Wall, popularly known as Hole in the Wall, a component of Japanese game show series Tonneruzu no Minasan no Okage deshita
  - Hole in the Wall (American game show), 2008–2009, 2010–2012
  - Hole in the Wall (Australian game show), 2008
  - Hole in the Wall (British game show), 2008–2009
  - Hole in the Wall (Philippine game show), 2009–2010
  - Hole in the Wall (Polish game show), 2009
  - Hole in the Wall (Vietnamese game show), 2014–2020
- "Hole in the Wall" (Justified), a 2013 episode of Justified

=== Other uses in arts and entertainment ===
- The Hole in the Wall Theatre, a former theatre in Perth, Western Australia
- Hole in the Wall (video game), based on the American game show
- Hole in the Wall, a Minecraft minigame played in MC Championship

== Other uses ==
- ATM (automated teller machine), in colloquial British English
- The Hole in the Wall, a 1999 educational experiment and subsequent development of minimally invasive education

== See also ==
- Hole in the Wall Gang (disambiguation)
- Hole-in-the-Wall Falls, a waterfall in Starvation Creek State Park, Oregon, US
- SeriousFun Children's Network, formerly known as The Association of Hole In The Wall Camps
