= Nyangilas =

Japanese girl group

- Origin: Tokyo, Japan
- Genres: Pop
- Years active: April 1986–September 1986
- Labels: Warner Pioneer
- Members: Rika Tatsumi (立見里歌); Aki Kihara (樹原亜紀); Mika Nagoya (名越美香); Mako Shiraishi (白石麻子)

Nyangilas (ニャンギラス, Nyangirasu) is a Japanese idol Jpop band created in 1986 as a four-member sub-group Onyanko Club.

== History ==
=== Formation ===
During November and December 1985, on Yūyake Nyan Nyan("Sunset Meow Meow") (夕やけニャンニャン), a Fuji TV program featuring Onyanko Club, discussions about the record debut of three unorthodox members, Rika Tatsumi(立見里歌, Tatsumi Rika), Aki Kihara(樹原亜紀, Kihara Aki), and Mika Nagoya(名越美香, Nagoya Mika), with opinions from the audience, took place under the name "Onyanko AID: Love Saves Onyanko!".

These three members were considered more comical characters than idols. Yasushi Akimoto, a lyricist and broadcast writer at the time, expressed his approval of their debut. It was then decided that a subgroup called Nyangilas would be formed with the addition of Mako Shiraishi(白石麻子, Shiraishi Mako). In April 1986, they debuted with a novelty song called Watashi wa Rika-chan (私は里歌ちゃん), which became the number one on the Oricon chart in its first appearance.

=== Second single ===
In June 1986, their second single, Jibunde Iunomo Nandesukedo (自分で言うのもなんですけど), was released, which also went to number one. in August 1986, their album, Saisho de Saigo (最初で最後), was released.

=== Break up ===
In September 1986, Nagoya graduated from Onyanko Club, and Nyangilas also disbanded. They have continued to communicate with each other after Onyanko Club disbanded in September 1987, and in May 2013, they all gathered at the Tower Records Shibuya store for a special talk show.

== Members ==
=== Aki Kihara ===
Aki Kihara (樹原亜紀, Kihara Aki, born March 30, 1969, in Kanagawa, Japan)

Kihara, then a freshman at Nakanobu Gakuen High School (中延学園高校), appeared on All Night Fuji High School Girl Special, which aired twice in February and March 1985. She then was selected as a member of Onyanko Club for some reason, and she made regular appearances on the TV program Yūyake Nyan Nyan featuring Onyanko Club, which launched on April 1, 1985.

However, about two weeks after the program started, a major scandal occurred. She and five other members, Mika Okuda (奥田美香, Okuda Mika), Michiko Enokida (榎田道子, Enokida Michiko), Kayoko Yoshino (吉野佳代子, Yoshino Kayoko), Mamiko Tomoda (友田麻美子, Tomoda Mamiko), and Mayumi Sato (佐藤真由美, Sato Mayumi), were photographed smoking in a coffee shop by a man from the weekly magazine Shūkan Bunshun. Although the published photograph only showed Mika Okuda smoking, the other members also admitted to smoking. On the contrary, Kihara stubbornly denied it. As a result, the five members who admitted smoking were dismissed from Onyanko Club, but Kihara was only suspended for two weeks. Since these five were considered core members of the group, the scandal changed the form and fate of Onyanko Club. On the other hand, no official explanation was ever given by the program's officials as to why she was the only one who was able to escape dismissal. They mentioned the scandal several times, but never about Kihara. The truth is still a mystery as to whether or not her repudiation had any effect on her avoiding dismissal.

She was one of the least popular members of Onyanko Club. Kihara herself admitted that she would never have been selected as a member of Onyanko Club if she had participated in the open audition called "The Scout: Where's Idols" held on Yūyake Nyan Nyan. On the other hand, her unique personality was appreciated by those around her, as her way of looking at things and thinking was different from the other members. She was regarded as one of the three most unorthodox characters in Onyanko Club, along with Rika Tatsumi and Susan Kumiko Yamamoto(山本スーザン久美子, Yamamoto Susan Kumiko). She was 173 cm tall, which was a very non-standard height for an idol at the time. Therefore, before she became a member of Onyanko Club, she was a model for the fashion magazine Olive, along with singer Minako Honda.

In April 1987, she graduated from Onyanko Club along with Sayuri Kokushō, Mamiko Takai, Rika Tatsumi, and Kazuko Utsumi(内海和子, Utsumi Kazuko). She then became a writer and wrote articles for the idol magazine DUNK, as well as for the subculture magazine Takarajima and the music information magazine Oricon. Moreover, for a time she lived in London with Mika Nagoya. She then backpacked throughout Asia. She also became a cook in a Japanese restaurant in Rotterdam, the Netherlands. There she married Dutch artist Geert Mul, became a housewife, and had two children.

=== Mika Nagoya ===
Mika Nagoya (名越美香, Nagoya Mika, born April 13, 1966, in Ōmiya, Saitama, Japan)

Nagoya, then a junior in the part-time course at Tokyo Metropolitan Yoyogi High School (東京都立代々木高校), also appeared on All Night Fuji High School Girl Special. Tsurutarō Kataoka, one of the hosts of the program, repeatedly pointed out that she resembled Mitsuko Yorichika(頼近美津子, Yorichika Mitsuko), an anchor who was married to the president of Fuji TV at the time and was the talk of the town. She then was invited by the program's officials to become a member of Onyanko Club and made regular appearances on Yūyake Nyan Nyan. Among the Onyanko Club members, along with Aki Kihara, she was regarded as having an excellent sense of fashion. As an old-timer, she is said to have often picked on the newer members, but it is believed that she was misunderstood as such because, unlike the others, she said what needed to be said clearly to them. She was petite at 153 cm and cried a lot, but was said to be one of the smarter members of Onyanko Club.

In September 1986, she graduated from Onyanko Club along with popular members such as Eri Nitta, Satomi Fukunaga, and Akie Yoshizawa. She then appeared on several TV programs, including Takeshi's Castle. Moreover, for a time she lived in London with Aki Kihara. There she met and married a Hong Kong pilot and had one child. Afterwards, she became a stylist in Hong Kong. She also formed an a cappella unit called SHEEPS.

=== Rika Tatsumi ===
Rika Tatsumi (立見里歌, Tatsumi Rika, born November 14, 1965, in Meguro, Tokyo, Japan)

In April 1984, Tatsumi enrolled at Tokai University after graduating from Tokyo Metropolitan Yoyogi High School (東海大学付属相模高校). In October of that year, she was selected as the grand prix winner of the university's idol contest. This led her to appear on Fuji TV's popular mid night program, All Night Fuji, and then became a member of All Nighters, a female college student idol group exclusive to the program. In March 1985, she graduated from All Nighters.

In April 1985, she was invited by a Fuji TV producer to appear the audition for Yūyake Nyan Nyan. Although candidates scoring more than 100 points would be accepted for the audition, she scored 142 points which made her a member of Onyanko Club. This score was never broken afterwards. Subsequently, however, when she realized that she was not suited to be an idol, she decided to pursue her own existence as a comedy-esque character. Thus, she became a unique representative of the unorthodox members of Onyanko Club.

In a segment called Hello, I, Rika-chan (もしもし私リカちゃん, Moshimoshi Watashi Rikachan), which started in January 1986, she and others, including Kazuko Utsumi, a student at Toita Women's College, answered quizzes given by the music critic Masanori Ito. They gave a series of inexplicable answers, such as the current president of the United States is Abraham Lincoln, the capital of the United Kingdom is Paris, and the meaning of the English word "Temptation" is temporary halt. They were criticized from various quarters for their intellect, which is unbecoming of college students. Tatsumi subsequently claimed on a radio program that she had just made the mistakes intentionally. In June 1986, in a segment called "Don't brag!! (新・エバってんじゃねえよ!!, Shin Ebattenjanēyo!)", The bickering suddenly started between her and Takaaki Ishibashi of the comedy duo Tunnels. On this occasion, Ishibashi became incensed and stormed out, then left the studio on his own.

In March 1987, she made her solo debut with the song I didn't mean to (そんなつもりじゃなかったのに, Sonnatsumorijanakattanoni). In April 1987, she graduated from Onyanko Club along with Sayuri Kokushō, Mamiko Takai, Aki Kihara, and Kazuko utsumi. In March 1988, she graduated from Tokai University and went to work for Pony Canyon, which released many Onyanko Club records. She then got married and had one child, but got divorced. Since then, she has been involved in several companies, including an advertising agency and a cosmetics related business.

=== Mako Shiraishi ===
Mako Shiraishi (白石麻子, Shiraishi Mako, born June 12, 1969, in Edogawa, Tokyo, Japan)

Shiraishi went through a number of auditions related to the entertainment industry when she was in junior high school. She was offered a chance to make her debut as a singer by the music school she was affiliated with at the time after she enrolled at Tokyo Metropolitan Koiwa High School (東京都立小岩高校) in April 1985. However, she participated in the audition for Yūyake Nyan Nyan and was accepted in July 1985. Then, with the recommendation of her music school teacher, she chose to join Onyanko Club instead of becoming a solo singer. According to the program's chief director, Kazuji Kasai, he was convinced that Shiraishi was absolutely essential to Onyanko Club, so he accepted her at his strong insistence. However, even though Shiraishi and Ruriko Nagata(永田ルリ子, Ruriko Nagata) were eager to make their solo debuts, Kasai refused on the grounds that they were not suitable for it. On the other hand, it is said that when she and Minayo Watanabe were the backing vocalists for Sayuri Kokushō's Valentine Kiss released in February 1986, she was approached by CBS Sony Records about making her solo debut, but she allegedly declined the offer.

According to Yasushi Akimoto, at first she vehemently refused to join Nyangilas. In front of Rika Tatsumi and staff members of the program, she cried and complained that she did not want to join such an unorthodox comedy subgroup. However, she was persuaded by Kasai and others that even such a subgroup needed a cute girl like you, and she agreed to join reluctantly. On the other hand, she herself flatly denied the story. Although she could not make her solo debut as a result, she did serve as the lead vocalist on several Onyanko Club songs. She remained with the group instead of graduating until September 1987, when Onyanko Club disbanded. She is described as the epitome of the bright, cute, normal girl and played a prominent supporting role in Onyanko Club.

She had four children after she got married in 1992. Entering the 2010s, she returned to the front of the stage and appeared in several television commercials. She also became a therapist for infants and a yoga instructor.

== Reaction ==
In reaction to their first single, music critic Kyōko Sugimura (杉村京子, Sugimura Kyōko) commented that "I believe that because Onyanko Club is at the peak of its popularity, it is in a lucky position to be allowed to release such an extremely silly song that pokes fun at people. However, if they were not members of Onyanko Club, even someone like me, who is as gentle as an angel, would surely give them a flying kick from behind and then hit them in the secret holes".

Akina Nakamori, a leading idol at the time, had an overt loathing for Nyangiras, also affiliated with Warner Pioneer. Nakamori sternly reprimanded one of the employees, saying, "Don't you feel ashamed that a world-class record company is promoting a group like that? Actually, Nakamori's staff members were also in charge of Nyangiras, but their names were not mentioned anywhere on the Nyangiras album because they did not want her to know this fact. Incidentally, Tatsumi was aware that they were loathed by Nakamori.

On the other hand, there was also an opinion that the song itself was highly accomplished, despite the emphasis on Rika Tatsumi's terrible singing. Akira Mitake, who actually composed the song, praised himself for the cool song, which sounds like a fusion of rock and roll and the idol trio Candies.

== Discography ==
=== Singles ===
- Watashi wa Rika-chan (April 1, 1986)
- Jibun de Yūnomo Nan Desukeredo (June 21, 1986)

=== Albums ===
- Saisho de Saigo ~First & Last~ (August 25, 1986)
