= All Night Fuji =

Japanese television variety show

- Genre: Variety show
- Story by: Yasushi Akimoto
- Directed by: Kazuji Kasai; Kōichi Minato (港浩一)
- Starring: All Nighters; Naomi Akimoto; Mari Torigoe (鳥越マリ); Tsurutarō Kataoka; Tunnels; Iyo Matsumoto; Yumi Asō; Masashi Tashiro; Haruko Sagara
- Country of origin: Japan
- Original language: Japanese
- No. of episodes: 404

Production
- Producer: Hiroshi Ishida (石田弘)
- Production company: Fuji Television

Original release
- Network: Fuji TV
- Release: April 2, 1983 – March 30, 1991

All Night Fuji (オールナイトフジ) is a Japanese television show aired from April 2, 1983, to March 30, 1991, on Fuji TV. A total of 404 episodes were aired. The program's average rating was 3.5%, and its highest rating was 7.2% on March 25, 1989. The ratings were described as exceptional for a midnight program.

== Program history ==
On April 2, 1983, Fuji TV launched All Night Fuji. It aired every Saturday at midnight. The program did not have a fixed ending time and was different for each episode. At times, the program would air until after 5:00 AM. The first hosts were female jazz singer Naomi Akimoto and actress Mari Torigoe. Subsequently, comedian Tsurutarō Kataoka, idol Iyo Matsumoto, and actress Yumi Asō became hosts. The comedy duo Tunnels(Takaaki Ishibashi and Noritake Kinashi) also made regular appearances. In addition, many female college students appeared on the program, and they were called All Nighters (オールナイターズ, Ōrunaitāzu). The program featured information on foreign music, surfing, and skiing, as well as broadcasts of Owarai and mini-concerts. Famous musicians such as Madonna, Cyndi Lauper, and Wham! also performed on the program. Wham!'s George Michael mentioned that the program was one of the most memorable events of his stay in Japan because he enjoyed it a lot. On the other hand, the program also had an obscene aspect, with female college students introducing pornographic videos and reporting massage parlor, No-pan kissa, Sex shop, and the like.

An arousing camera commercial featuring Kumamoto University female student Yoshiko Miyazaki (宮崎美子, Miyazaki Yoshiko) in 1980 and a radio program called Miss DJ Request Parade (ミスDJリクエストパレード), featuring female college students as DJs, which launched in 1981, led to the rise of the female college student craze in Japan. And it reached its zenith with the arrival of All Night Fuji. According to the producer Hiroshi Ishida, the program was initiated with the intention of producing a silly show based on the school festival groove. In fact, not a few people made fun of All Night Fuji owing to the inauthenticity and obscenity of the female college students. When comedian Beat Takeshi appeared on the program in September 1983, he abused female college students to their faces. Science fiction writer Takeshi Kamewada (亀和田武, Kamewada Takeshi) also made similar criticisms of them. Even Tsurutarō Kataoka, one of the hosts of the program, remarked in a weekly magazine that he hated female college students on the program because they were all idiots. In response, they fought back by publishing a book titled We're not Idiots, This is All Night Fuji (私たちはバカじゃない―オールナイトフジで～す, Watashitachi wa bakajanai―Ōrunaitofujidēsu).

In October 1984, similar programs such as TV Pirate Channel (TV海賊チャンネル) on Nippon TV, Midnight in Roppongi (ミッドナイトin六本木) on TV Asahi and The Exciting Night (夜はエキサイティング) on TV Tokyo started airing at about the same time slot, influenced by All Night Fuji. Only Hello! Midnight (ハロー! ミッドナイト) on TBS TV, hosted by singer-songwriter Chiharu Matsuyama, turned its back on this line and was a strait-laced program talking about politics and economics instead of showing naked women.

In early 1985, the obscene and extreme contents of these midnight programs became a problem in the House of Representatives, and the Ministry of Posts and Telecommunications (now the Ministry of Internal Affairs and Communications) demanded that all programs refrain from airing such material. At about the same time, the revised Businesses Affecting Public Morals Regulation Act came into effect, which tightened regulation of the sex industry. Thus, starting in April 1985, All Night Fuji was forced to change direction to a variety program that did not include a lot of overt sexually explicit material. The program continued until March 1991, with several changes of hosts.

In April 2023, after 40 years since its first broadcast, All Night Fuji was revived under the name All Night Fujiko (オールナイトフジコ, Ōrunaito Fujiko). Kōichi Minato, the program's iconic director, became president of Fuji TV, and he decided to revive the program after consulting with Yasushi Akimoto, who had once been the program's scriptwriter. They felt the need to revive the heat of that era in the present day. Akimoto is the general producer of the program, and TV personality Nobuyuki Sakuma(佐久間宣行, Sakuma Nobuyuki) serves as the host. The program airs for two hours every Friday midnight. In January 2025, Minato resigned due to Fuji Television sexual harassment scandal. Therefore, the program was terminated in March 2025.

== All Nighters ==
An idol group called All Nighters was formed by a large number of female college students who appeared on All Night Fuji. Their song, "Leave us as college girls (女子大生にさせといて, Joshidaisei ni sasetoite)" became the theme song for the program. Its first subgroup, Okawari Sisters (おかわりシスターズ) (Miki Yamazaki (山崎美貴, Yamazaki Miki), Hasumi Matsuo (松尾羽純, Matsuo Hasumi), and Tomoko Fukaya (深谷智子, Fukaya Tomoko)), made their record debut in February 1984 with the song Love Encore (恋をアンコール, Koi wo ankōru). Of the three, Yamazaki and Matsuo were originally in charge of introducing pornographic videos. Whenever they introduced a video, host Tsurutarō Kataoka, would say Okawari! (おかわり, Okawari) (meaning "Introduce more videos!"), which led to the name of the subgroup. The second subgroup, Oazuke Sisters (おあずけシスターズ, Oazuke Shisutāzu) (Seiko Kataoka (片岡聖子, Kataoka Seiko) and Akiko Inoue (井上明子, Inoue Akiko)), also debuted in May with the song Tokyo Kan Kan Girl '84 (東京カンカン娘'84, Tōkyō kan kan musume hachijūyon). All Nighters released two albums in 1984, which included songs by subgroups such as Onedari Sisters (おねだりシスターズ, Onedari Shisutāzu), Otetsuki Sisters (おてつきシスターズ, Otetsuki Shisutāzu), and Yomawari Sisters (よまわり姉妹, Yomawari Shimai). On August 8, 1984, at their concert held at Yomiuriland East, Hasumi Matsuo of Okawari Sisters shouted, I love you all! (みんな、大好き！, Minna Daisuki!) is considered to be one of the most quotable phrases in the history of idols. On March 30, 1985, almost all the early members of All Nighters graduated from the program, and along with them, the most popular subgroup, Okawari Sisters, also disbanded. Among them, only Miki Yamazaki remained with the program and was promoted to one of the hosts.

All Nighters is considered the origin of the Idol groups formed by a large number of girls. Onyanko Club, which became the biggest female idol group of the 1980s, followed the methodology of All Nighters. This was due to the fact that both groups were produced by Hiroshi Ishida, Kazuji Kasai and Kōichi Minato.

== All Night Fuji High School Girl Special ==
On February 23 and March 16, 1985, All Night Fuji High School Girl Special We, too, ain't idiots was aired in the evening on two separate occasions. These special episodes were hosted by Tsurutarō Kataoka and novice idols Yuki Saitō and Mariko (真璃子, Mariko). Many high school girls gathered in the studio to answer obscene quizzes and engage in Puroresu. Some of them went out on the town and forced male passersby to wear sailor suits. They also repeatedly committed shameless acts, such as taking off the underwear of male passersby and stamping a seal on their buttocks, and forcibly kissing them. Of the five who were subsequently dismissed for the Shūkan bunshun smoking scandal, Kayoko Yoshino (吉野佳代子, Yoshino Kayoko) and Mamiko Tomoda (友田麻美子, Tomoda Mamiko) revealed the existence of their boyfriends. Yoshino even called herself "Fashion Massage". Yuki Saitō claimed that the high school girls who appeared on the program were a completely different race from her, that they and she were like oil and water, and that she could not understand their excessive fuss at all. Additionally, Bishōjo Contest was held and Sayuri Kokushō was named the grand prix winner. Onyanko Club was then formed by 11 girls, including Kokushō, who were selected from among many high school girls who appeared on the program. They became the exclusive idol group for Yūyake Nyan Nyan("Sunset Meow Meow") (夕やけニャンニャン), which started airing on April 1, 1985. Rika Tatsumi, who was accepted into Onyanko Club at the audition in mid-April 1985, was one of All Nighters. Likewise, Kazuko Utsumi(内海和子, Utsumi Kazuko) was a student at Toita Women's College at the time she was accepted into Onyanko Club in early April, which led to her appearing on All Night Fuji for a while as well.

In 1988, The New High School Girl Special was aired three times during the daytime on July 30, August 27, and September 24. However, this special program did not lead to the derivation of an idol group like Onyanko Club. Still, Hiromi Nagasaku, one of the high school girls who appeared on the program, subsequently became a member of the popular idol group Ribbon.

== Unexpected happenings ==
On April 1, 1984, Akiko Matsumoto, a female idol at the time, shouted the broadcast-prohibited term "Omanko" (おまんこ; Japanese slang for female genitalia). The reason was that host Tsurutarō Kataoka and rakugo storyteller Tsurukō Shōfukutei (笑福亭鶴光, Shōfukutei Tsurukō) threatened to reveal that her boyfriend was a bisexual male celebrity if she did not utter the term. This remark led to Matsumoto getting very little work in the entertainment industry for two years.

On January 19, 1985, Tunnels performed their new song, Ikki! (一気!). During the performance, Takaaki Ishibashi toppled one of the TV cameras, causing it to break. The TV camera was an expensive one, costing 15 million yen (approximately US$300,000 at the time), but was covered by the insurance company.

A woman by the name of Meg the Numb Blowfish (しびれフグのメグ, Shibirefugu No Megu), who works at a massage parlor in Kabukichō, Tokyo, applied for the program under the false name of Chie Shinozaki (篠崎千絵, Shinozaki Chie), pretending to be a female student at Aoyama Gakuin University. The program's officials, however, could not see through it and hired her as a member of All Nighters. In June 1985, she was dismissed from All Nighters after her true identity was exposed by the weekly magazine Shūkan Bunshun.

== See also ==
- All Night Nippon
