= Iyo Matsumoto =

Japanese singer and actress (born 1965)

- Also known as: Kozono Iyo (小園伊代), legal name
- Born: Matsumoto Iyo (松本伊代); June 21, 1965 (age 61); Ōta, Tokyo, Japan
- Genres: J-pop, Kayokyoku
- Occupations: TV personality; singer; actress
- Years active: 1981–present
- Spouse: Hiromi (1993–present)

YouTube information
- Channel: 松本伊代
- Years active: 2021–present
- Subscribers: 19.4 thousand
- Views: 29.8 million
- Last updated: April 9, 2026

Iyo Matsumoto (松本伊代, Matsumoto Iyo; born June 21, 1965), married name Iyo Kozono (小園伊代, Kozono Iyo), is a Japanese TV personality, singer and actress who achieved significant success as a pop idol in the early 1980s. She is currently signed to the Production No Title agency.

== Early life ==
Matsumoto was born in Ōta, Tokyo, Japan. She attended Morimura Academy (森村学園, Morimura Gakuen) from kindergarten through middle school and continued to Horikoshi High School, a private high school in the Nakano section of Tokyo. She completed her studies at Toita Women's College also in the city.

== Career ==
Matsumoto debuted in the entertainment business in 1981 when she was 15 years old, after being scouted by the agency Bond Kikaku while shopping in Shinjuku. Dubbed "Toshihiko Tahara's little sister", her singing career was launched in October the same year with the single "Sentimental Journey" which was an instant hit, making it to no. 9 on the Oricon Chart. The single went on to sell over 300,000 copies, and remains her biggest hit.

In 1982, she was awarded the Newcomer Prize at the 24th Japan Record Awards., along with many other newcomer awards from various TV stations. On January 1, 1983, Matsumoto became the youngest artist to hold a concert in Nippon Budokan at the age of 17 years and 6 months. The record was broken that September by Sayuri Iwai, at 15 years and 1 month.

From 1984 to 1986, Matsumoto hosted the midnight TV show All Night Fuji, while steadily releasing four singles each year.

After the peak of her pop idol career in the late 80s, she shifted her focus onto becoming a TV presenter as well as doing other work, and was well received. In 1992, she starred in the Tokyo TV drama Kinono Watashi Ni Sayonara (Goodbye to the Old Me) Four years later she participated as a judge on Iron Chef. She teamed up with fellow idols Yū Hayami and Chiemi Hori in 2005 to form the unit Cutie☆Mommy, with whom she released two singles.

In 2009, she released Sweet 16 Box, a box set that compiled all of the albums from her idol career and a bonus CD and DVD. Included was her first new song in 19 years, titled "Watashi no Koe wo Kiite" (私の声を聞いて), written by Ami Ozaki.

As a 30-year commemoration of her debut, in 2012 she held a concert at the Shinagawa Prince Hotel's Stellar Ball and released a best-of album which included a handshake ticket.

On January 13, 2016, while filming a travel programme with Hayami, both of them allegedly trespassed onto the track of the Sanin Main Line near Saga-Arashiyama Station in Kyoto without authorization and were almost prosecuted. Both Matsumoto and Hayami were heavily criticized by the media and held separate press conferences apologising after the incident was made public. After the situation was assessed, and both were acknowledged as unaware of the regulations, the charge was dropped.

In 2017, the unit Cutie☆Mommy was renewed, this time with Hiroko Moriguchi replacing Chiemi Hori, and was renamed Cutie☆MoriMori. In February 2024, the unit released a new single, entitled "Soro Soro Fuyu desu nee" (It's almost winter, isn't it?), produced by Noritake Kinashi and written by George Tokoro. The single was billed under each singer's individual discography, particularly on RecoChoku and Apple Music.

== Personal life ==
In 1993, she married Japanese comedian Hiromi. She is the mother of two sons: the eldest is actor Ryo Kozono.

== Discography ==
=== Singles ===
List of singles, with selected chart positions
Year	Single	Peak chart positions	Formats
Year	Single	JPN Physical	Formats
1981	"Sentimental Journey" （センチメンタル・ジャーニー）	9	CD, LP, Cassette
1982	"Love Me Tender" （ラブ・ミー・テンダー）	11	CD, LP, Cassette
1982	"TV no Kuni kara Kirakira" （TVの国からキラキラ）	15	CD, LP, Cassette
1982	"Otona ja Nai no" （オトナじゃないの）	16	CD, LP, Cassette
1982	"Dakishimetai" （抱きしめたい）	9	CD, LP, Cassette
1983	"Chinese Kiss" （チャイニーズ・キッス）	12	CD, LP, Cassette
1983	"Taiyou ga Ippai" （太陽がいっぱい）	12	CD, LP, Cassette
1983	"Koi no Biorhythm" （恋のバイオリズム）	16	CD, LP, Cassette
1983	"Toki ni Ai wa" （時に愛は）	8	CD, LP, Cassette
1984	"Koi no KNOW-HOW" （恋のKNOW-HOW）	10	CD, LP, Cassette
1984	"Nagareboshi ga Suki" （流れ星が好き）	24	CD, LP, Cassette
1984	"Shyness Boy" （シャイネスボーイ）	24	CD, LP, Cassette
1984	"Believe" （ビリーヴ）	11	CD, LP, Cassette
1985	"Anata ni Kaeritai (Dancin' In the Heart)" （あなたに帰りたい）	16	CD, LP, Cassette
1985	"Ponytail wa Musubanai" （ポニーテイルは結ばない）	21	CD, LP, Cassette
1985	"Gekka Bijin" （月下美人）	30	CD, LP, Cassette
1986	"Last Kiss wa Hoho ni Shite" （Last Kissは頬にして）	22	CD, LP, Cassette
1986	"Shinjikata wo Oshiete" （信じかたを教えて）	17	CD, LP, Cassette
1986	"Sayonara wa Watashi no Tame ni" （サヨナラは私のために）	18	CD, LP, Cassette
1987	"Omoide wo Kirei ni Shinaide" （思い出をきれいにしないで）	23	CD, LP, Cassette
1987	"Suteki na Jealousy" （すてきなジェラシー）	19	CD, LP, Cassette
1988	"Samishisa nara Hitotsu" （淋しさならひとつ）	23	CD, LP, Cassette
1988	"Sonatine/Nakanaide Gatsby" （泣かないでギャツビー）	83	CD, LP, Cassette
1989	"Kanashikute Yarikirenai" （悲しくてやりきれない）	57	CD, Cassette
1990	"Kitto Wasureru kara" （きっと忘れるから）	-	CD, Cassette
"—" denotes items which did not chart

=== Digital singles ===
Year	Single	Reference
2013	"Watashi no Koe wo Kiite"	
2015	"Sentimental Journey: Mada 50sai ver."	
2021	"Sentimental Journey: 40th Anniversary Version"	
2021	"Kutenai Hotel"	
2021	"Love Me Tender"	
2022	"Toki ni Ai wa (2022 New Vocal Version)"	
2022	"Shinjikata wo Oshiete (2022 New Vocal Version)"	
2024	"Chotto Suteki na Journey"	
2024	"Soro soro Fuyu desu nee"	

=== Albums ===
List of albums, with selected chart positions
Title	Album details	Peak positions
Title	Album details	JPN Oricon
Sentimental I-Y-O	Released: December 5, 1981; Label: Victor Entertainment; Formats: CD, LP, Cassette tape, digital download, streaming	8
Something I-Y-O	Released: April 21, 1982; Label: Victor Entertainment; Formats: CD, LP, Cassette tape, digital download, streaming	4
Only Seventeen	Released: October 5, 1982; Label: Victor Entertainment; Formats: CD, LP, Cassette tape, digital download, streaming	4
Endless Summer	Released: June 21, 1983; Label: Victor Entertainment; Formats: CD, LP, Cassette tape, digital download, streaming	7
Yume Hitotsu Shinkirou	Released: December 5, 1983; Label: Victor Entertainment; Formats: CD, LP, Cassette tape, digital download, streaming	16
Sugar Rain	Released: March 5, 1984; Label: Victor Entertainment; Formats: CD, LP, Cassette tape, digital download, streaming	17
Sentimental Dance Club	Released: August 21, 1985; Label: Victor Entertainment; Formats: CD, LP, Cassette tape, digital download, streaming	26
Tenshi no Baka	Released: September 5, 1986; Label: Victor Entertainment; Formats: CD, LP, Cassette tape, digital download, streaming	33
Kaze no You ni	Released: December 16, 1987; Label: Victor Entertainment; Formats: CD, LP, Cassette tape, digital download, streaming	67
Private File	Released: January 21, 1989; Label: Victor Entertainment; Formats: CD, LP, Cassette tape, digital download, streaming	97
Innocence	Released: October 21, 1989; Label: Victor Entertainment; Formats: CD, Cassette tape, digital download, streaming	-
Mariage: Mou Wakakunai kara	Released: January 21, 1991; Label: Victor Entertainment; Formats: CD, Cassette tape, digital download, streaming	-
"—" denotes items which did not chart

=== Cover albums ===
List of cover albums, with selected chart positions
Title	Album details	Peak positions
Title	Album details	JPN Oricon
Treasure Voice (40th Anniversary Song Book) Dedicated to Kyōhei Tsutsumi	Released: December 22, 2021; Label: Victor Entertainment; Formats: CD, digital download, streaming	2
"—" denotes items which did not chart

=== Live albums ===
List of live albums, with selected chart positions
Title	Album details	Peak positions
Title	Album details	JPN Oricon
Iyo in Budokan	Released: January 1, 1983; Label: Victor Entertainment; Formats: CD, LP, Cassette tape, digital download, streaming	13

=== Compilation albums ===
List of albums, with selected chart positions
Title	Album details	Peak positions
Title	Album details	JPN Oricon
Believe	Released: December 21, 1984; Label: Victor Entertainment; Formats: CD, LP, Cassette tape, digital download, streaming	17
Review Super Best	Released: November 21, 1985; Label: Victor Entertainment; Formats: CD, LP, Cassette tape, digital download, streaming	-
Single Collection	Released: March 5, 1986; Label: Victor Entertainment; Formats: CD, LP, Cassette tape, digital download, streaming	44
Complete Single Collection	Released: November 21, 1986; Label: Victor Entertainment; Formats: CD, LP, Cassette tape, digital download, streaming	-
Matsumoto Iyo CD FILE VOL.1/2/3	Released: December 16, 1987; Label: Victor Entertainment; Formats: CD, LP, Cassette tape, digital download, streaming	-
The Best REFILL	Released: November 21, 1989; Label: Victor Entertainment; Formats: CD, Cassette tape, digital download, streaming	-
Matsumoto Iyo CD FILE VOL.4	Released: June 21, 1990; Label: Victor Entertainment; Formats: CD, Cassette tape, digital download, streaming	-
Siesta: The Best	Released: November 7, 1990; Label: Victor Entertainment; Formats: CD, Cassette tape, digital download, streaming	-
Matsumoto Iyo Zenkyokushuu	Released: December 1, 1993; Label: Victor Entertainment; Formats: CD, digital download, streaming	-
Matsumoto Iyo Best of Best	Released: October 26, 1994; Label: Victor Entertainment; Formats: CD, digital download, streaming	-
New Best One	Released: August 4, 1999; Label: Victor Entertainment; Formats: CD, digital download, streaming	-
Matsumoto Iyo Best Selection	Released: March 24, 2005; Label: Victor Entertainment; Formats: CD, digital download, streaming	-
Matsumoto Iyo Golden Best	Released: September 16, 2009; Label: Victor Entertainment; Formats: CD, digital download, streaming	-
Always I-Y-O (30th Anniversary BEST ALBUM)	Released: September 26, 2012; Label: Victor Entertainment; Formats: CD, digital download, streaming	217
YAPPARI I・Y・O'16	Released: September 28, 2016; Label: Victor Entertainment; Formats: CD, digital download, streaming	-
"—" denotes items which did not chart

=== Box sets ===
List of box sets, with selected chart positions
Title	Album details	Peak positions
Title	Album details	JPN Oricon
Matsumoto Iyo Box	Released: March 24, 2003; Label: Victor Entertainment; Formats: 4CD+3DVD	-
Sweet 16 Box: Original Album Collection	Released: September 23, 2009; Label: Victor Entertainment; Formats: 15CD+2DVD	-
"—" denotes items which did not chart

=== Other appearances ===
List of non-studio album or guest appearances that feature Iyo Matsumoto
Title	Year	Artist	Album/Single
"BOYFRIEND A GOGO"	2007	-	Beautiful Katamari Original Soundtrack
"Ima ga Ichiban Suki"	2022	Yu Hayami	Affection: YU HAYAMI 40th Anniversary Collection
"Shinjikata wo Oshiete (2022 New Vocal Version)"	2023	Tetsuji Hayashi	50th Anniversary Special A Tribute of Hayashi Tetsuji: Saudade
"Cécille"	2026	AKB48	Nagori Zakura (名残り桜)
