= Yaen =

J-pop group

- Origin: Japan
- Genres: J-pop
- Years active: April 29, 1998–May 13, 2001
- Label: Avex Trax
- Members: Taka; Nori; Terurin; Kan; Naru Naru; Jerry; Baca; Syu; Hossy; Gote; Takaku
- Past members: CA; Yoshiroucchi; Kanbara; Yan

Yaen (野猿, lit. "Wild Monkey") was a Japanese pop group composed of Takaaki Ishibashi and Noritake Kinashi of the comedy duo The Tunnels, and nine staff members from their television variety show The Tunnels' Thanks to Everyone. From 1998 to 2001, Yaen released three studio albums, eleven singles, and four concert videos, all of which reached the top ten on the Oricon charts.

== History ==
Yaen was created by music producers Akimoto Yasushi and Tsugutoshi Gotō, who wrote parody songs for The Tunnels beginning in the 1980s. The group was originally formed for the purpose of performing a parody version of a KinKi Kids song on the music variety show Utaban, but subsequently signed with the record label Avex Trax and made their debut as a legitimate pop group on April 29, 1998. The group's name is derived from Hotel Yaen, a famous love hotel located in Tokyo.

Despite their novel origins, Yaen achieved considerable mainstream success: the group released three studio albums, eleven singles, and four concert videos, all of which reached the top ten on the Oricon charts. The group sold three million albums, and performed at Kōhaku Uta Gassen in two consecutive years. Several of the group's singles were choreographed by Sam, Etsu, and Chiharu from TRF. Yaen announced on February 8, 2001 that they would disband, citing a desire by its members to return to their original jobs. The group formally disbanded on May 13, 2001, following their final concert at Yoyogi National Gymnasium. Several of the group's members continued to work at The Tunnels' Thanks to Everyone in their original roles, and made occasional appearances on the series.

In 2009, Yaen reunited to mark the 21st anniversary of The Tunnels, where they participated in a one-off televised performance in which they attempted to replicate the choreography to their singles from memory. On March 9, 2011, in commemoration of the tenth anniversary of the group's disbandment, Yaen's songs were released on the digital streaming platform Recochoku. On September 17, 2019, Taka announced the formation of B Pressure, a pop group composed of himself, Terurin, and Kanchan.

== Members ==
Original roles on The Tunnels' Thanks to Everyone are noted in parentheses.

- Taka (Takaaki Ishibashi), vocals (host)
- Nori (Noritake Kinashi), vocals (host)
- Terurin (Teruchika Hirayama), vocals (acrylic decorations)
- Kan (Norihito Kannami), vocals (costumes)
- Naru Naru (Kazuhiro Narui), dancer (large props)
- Jerry (Ikuomi Iizuka), dancer (special effects)
- Baca (Takashi Ohhara), dancer (large props)
- Shu (Takahisa Amino), dancer (props)
- Hossy (Michiaki Hoshino), dancer (driver)
- Gote (Kazumichi Handa), dancer (photographer)
- Takaku (Seiji Takaku), dancer (camera crane)

Past members:

- CA (Chika Arai) (voiceover)
- Yoshiroucchi (Yoshiro Asano) (writer)
- Takashi Kanbara (director)
- Yan (Kazuya Ota) (director)

== Discography ==
=== Studio albums ===
- Staff Roll (March 10, 1999)
- Evolution (March 1, 2000)
- Tesshū (March 14, 2001)

=== Singles ===
- "Get Down" (April 29, 1998)
- "Sakebi" (September 17, 1998)
- "Snow Blind" (December 16, 1998)
- "Be Cool!" (February 24, 1999)
- "Selfish" (August 4, 1999)
- "Yozora wo Machinagara" (November 10, 1999)
- "First Impression" (February 2, 2000)
- "Chicken Guys" (May 31, 2000)
- "Taiyo no Kaseki" (October 12, 2000)
- "Star" (January 24, 2001)
- "Fish Fight!" (February 28, 2001)

=== Tour and concert recordings ===
- Yaen Concert In Yokohama Arena 1999 (July 7, 1999)
- Yaen 2000GTR Budokan Limited Inter Cooler Daihappyokai (July 19, 2000)
- Yaen Video Clips and History: The Greatest Hits (May 3, 2001)
- Kanzen Tesshu 4-jikan Densetsu (July 25, 2001)
