= Hiromi (comedian) =

Japanese television and radio presenter

- ヒロミ
- Born: Hiromi Kozono; 13 February 1965 (age 61); Hachiōji, Tokyo, Japan
- Education: Shōwa First Technical High School; The Open University of Japan
- Occupations: Comedian, television presenter, radio personality, actor, businessman, triathlete, racing driver
- Years active: 1986–
- Agent: Be Company
- Known for: Waratte Iitomo!; Vocabula Tengoku series; Mogumogu Gumbo; Hakkutsu! Aruaru Daijiten
- Height: 1.75 m (5 ft 9 in)
- Spouse: Iyo Matsumoto (m. 1993)
- Children: Ryo Kozono (eldest son)

Hiromi (ヒロミ; born 13 February 1965, in Hachiōji, Tokyo, Japan) is a Japanese comedian, television presenter, radio personality, actor, businessman, triathlete, and racing driver. He is the president of Be Company. His full name is Hiromi Kozono (小園 浩己, Kozono Hiromi).

While Be Company is from Production Jin Riki-sha, Hiromi is represented with Tanabe Agency and later Production No Title since 2008. His wife is singer Iyo Matsumoto. Hiromi's eldest son is tarento Ryo Kozono.

== Auto racing ==
Hiromi made his debut in the Super GT championship in 2004 as one of Team Gaikokuya's drivers in the GT300 class, partnering former GT300 champion Yoshimi Ishibashi in the team's Porsche 911 GT3. He failed to score a championship point and secured a best finish of 18th place in the fifth round at Twin Ring Motegi. Two years later in February 2006, he announced his return to the series as part of the 06H Project, driving one of Jim Gainer's Ferrari 360 in the GT300 class for the full-season. He once again failed to score a championship point in 2006, scoring a best finish of 14th in the fourth round at Sepang.

=== Racing records ===
==== Complete JGTC/Super GT results ====
(key) (Races in bold indicate pole position) (Races in italics indicate fastest lap)

Year	Team	Car	Class	1	2	3	4	5	6	7	8	9	DC	Pts
2004	Team Gaikokuya	Porsche 911 GT3	GT300	TAI; Ret	SUG; 23	SEP; 20	TOK	MOT; 18	AUT; 23	SUZ; 24			NC	0
2006	Jim Gainer Racing	Ferrari 360	GT300	SUZ; 19	OKA; 16	FUJ; Ret	SEP; 14	SUG; Ret	SUZ; Ret	MOT; 19	AUT	FUJ; 22	NC	0

== Filmography ==
=== Television ===
==== TV drama ====
Year	Title	Role	Network
1990	Christmas Eve	Sugisaku Maekawa	TBS
1994	Ari Yosaraba	Senichi's student	TBS
1997	Kare	Rinichi Osawa	KTV
1997	Producer ni Naritai	Natsume	TBS
1999	Teppen	Yusuke Muraki	TV Asahi
2001	Omae no Yukichi ga Naite iru	Takaaki Ohira	TV Asahi
2006	Shin Momotarō Samurai	Minokichi	TV Asahi
2016	Soshite, Dare mo Inaku Natta	Tatsuo Tajima	NTV

==== TV programs ====
Year	Title	Role	Notes	Ref.
1992	Waratte Iitomo!		Wednesday regular	
1992	Waratte Iitomo! Tokudai-gō			
1992	Waratte Iitomo Special Issue			
1992	Tamori no Vocabula Tengoku	MC		
1992	Oshiete! Galileo			
1993	Quiz Sekai wa Show by Shobai!!		Quasi-regular appearances	
1993	Sanma no Nan Demo Derby			
1993	Mogumogu Gumbo	MC		
1993	Beat Takeshi no Tsukuri Kata			
1993	Challenge Dai Maō			
1994	All Night Fuji			
1994	Sekai no Chō Gōka Chinpin Ryōri			
1994	TV Oja Mammoth	MC		
1994	Uta no Naruki	MC		
1994	Takeshi, Tokoro no Dracula ga Neratteru			
1994	Detekoi!! Mūchasu	MC		
1994	TV Digest	MC		
1995	Kozono Sōken	MC		
1995	Shinshun Yokubō Quiz: Onna wa Dokyō Otoko wa IQ	MC		
1995	Monomane Battle	MC		
1995	Quiz 21! Jack o Nerae			
1995	Honakin Data Land	MC		
1995	Saidai Kōyaku Show	MC		
1995	Jinnai & Hiromi no M's na Yoru	MC		
1996	Zenryaku Hiromi-sama	MC		
1996	Geinō-kai Dai Boke-darake no Tensai Quiz-ō Kettei-sen	MC		
1996	Musume wa Yaran zo! Watashitachi, Kekkon o Hantai sa Retemasu Kappuru Dai Shūgō	MC		
1996	Senryū Yakusha	MC		
1996	Beat Takeshi no TV Tackle			
1996	The Bingo Star	MC		
1996	Apa: Hiromi no Otona no Asobikata	MC		
1996	Kamisama!! Bomb!	MC		
1996	Kamioka, Hiromi no Hana mo Arashi mo	MC		
1996	Hakkutsu! Aruaru Daijiten	MC		
1997	U.S	MC		
1997	Bilibili Sasete	MC		
1997	Pleasure for You	MC		
1997	Dan Totsu!! Heisei King	MC		
1998	Romihi	MC		
1998	8-ji da J	MC		
1998	Atsumare! Nandemo Emi Gakkō	MC		
1998	Rasuchan	MC		
1999	Shinshutsukibotsu! Takeshimu Ken		Quasi-regular appearances	
1999	Hiromi no America Jūdan 6000 km!! Mississippi-gawa Gekirei no Kawa Kudari 15-kakan! Ase to Namida			
1999	Voca TV: Kagirinaku Vocabula ni Chikai Tengoku Owarai Survival Onsen Tsuā Dai Sakusen	MC		
1999	Nenmatsu Jumbo Nama Tokuban! Noritake Hiromi to yu Kaina Nakama ga TV de Yaritakatta Koto 50	MC		
1999	Snow Beat	MC		
1999	Hirosupo	MC		
2000	Songura	MC		
2000	Shin Baka Naoko Ken ni Katsu! Manatsu Keanzu de Hiromi no Danjuku	MC		
2000	Tokoro, Noritake, Hiromi no Konna Bangumi Dame desu ka?	MC		
2000	Naoko, Hiromi & Monomane Gundan no Yoshi Ikuzō-sama go Settai Gōka Onsen Tour	MC		
2000	Revenge Night	MC		
2000	Tamago no Yakata	MC		
2000	The! Oishii Bangumi	MC		
2001	The Gentei-hin	MC		
2001	Hiromi & Masaru Hanada no Tsuri Baka Chūbō-tai: Fuyu no Gourmet − Mansai Hiromi vs Masaru Hanada Nabe Ryōri Taiketsu	MC		
2001	GT ni Ikou!	MC		
2001	Osuto!? World	MC		
2001	Tokyo Tenshi	MC		
2001	Chīsana Koi Mitsuketa	MC		
2001	Satappachi: Furutachi no Kaimono Boogie!!			
2004	Go Etsu Dōseki	MC		
2004	Koichi, Kiichi, Hiromi mo Dai Kōfun! Chō Gōka Athlete Sō Shutsuen!! Kinashi Noritake Major Seiha no Tabi	MC		
2004	Naniwa no Geinin ga Tōkon Chūnyū! Takada, Hiromi, Katsumura ga Tanomukara Kanbenshitekure Dai Settai SP	MC		
2005	Geneki Kyōshi 1000-hito Dai Kokuhaku! Sensei Datte Ningen Nanda! Ganbare! Honō no Ōen	MC		
2007	Quiz! Doko Made Shitteru?! Hokkaido Kettei! Joshidai-sei Queen	MC		
2010	Nippon! Chōjin Hero Hakken-den	MC		
2011	Yūmeijin no Jōhō: Kaitori Senmon Warau Shichiya	MC		
2012	Warattame Tengoku		Quasi-regular appearance	
2012	Kineshi Mesen! Nori Sun no Hawaii			
2014	Shitemiru TV! Kyo-kun no Susume		Quasi-regular appearances	
2014	Bankuruwase	MC		
2014	Tokyo Memories: Ano Toki Ano Machi de Ano Nakama to	MC		
2014	Shutsubotsu! Japan desu yo	MC		
2014	The! Ningensei Derby	MC		
2014	Katsuma o Sagase: Arima Kinen Clinic	MC		
2014	Deep Girl	MC		
2014	Zen Ryaku, Tsuki no Uekara	MC		
2014	News na Bansan-kai			
2014	Wide na Show		Quasi-regular appearances	
2015	Bijo-tachi no Nichiyōbi	MC		
2015	Hatto Shita Note no Kai: Jinsei ga Chotto Tanoshiku Naru Kizuki	MC		
2015	Nazo Toki! My Name	MC		
2015	Saikyō No. 1 Kettei-sen Magic-ō	MC		
2015	Nihon o Imaichido Sentaku Shi Sōrō.	MC		
2015	Hiromi & Junior no Ittai Nan Nanda!? Happyōkai	MC		
2015	Yononaka Nametemashita!! Hansei Shimasu Kansha × Joshi	MC		
2015	Hiromi no Fan Sōkai	MC		
2015	Utsucchata Eizou GP	MC		
2015	Uchi no Gaya ga Sumimasen!	MC		
2015	Noritake, Fumiya, Hiromi ga Iku! Camping kā Gasshuku: Deai, Fureai, Shiawase Tabi	MC		
2015	Uta ga Umai Ōzakettei-sen Special	MC		
2015	Yacchimatta TV	MC		
2015	Aki no Sakidori Mono Tours	MC		
2015	Tsukkomi! The World	MC		
2015	Oja Map!!		Quasi-regular appearances	
2015	Downtown Now		Quasi-regular appearances	
2015	Masahiro Nakai no Mininaru Toshokan		Quasi-regular appearances	
2015	Hokunetsu Live: Vivit		Friday regular	
2015	Ariyoshi Seminar		Corner regular	
2016	High Noon TV Viking!		Tuesday regular	
2016	Hiromi no Hachiōji Rehome SP	MC		
2016	Zutto Hikkakattemashita	MC		
2016	Chō Nippon Suki Gaikoku Hito No 1 Kettei-sen: Quiz Japon	MC		
2016	Asobi no Gakkō: Hiromi ga Oshieru Otona Life	MC		
2018–2022	Tuesday Surprise	MC	Program ended in 2021, with 2 specials after that.	
2022–2023	The purachina risuto ~ sutā ga umareta densetsu no meibo ~ (THEプラチナリスト～スターが生まれた伝説の名簿～)	MC	Co-hosted with Masahiro Nakai	
2023–	Hiromi no osekkai	MC		
2023–	Aiba Hiromi no okomaridesu kā? [ja]	MC	4 specials, regular program from September 2025	

=== Radio ===
Year	Title	Network
1994	Hiromi no Zakenja Night	TBS Radio
1995	Dokusen! Hiromi Club	TBS Radio
1995	Hiromi no E Jan Yoh	TBS Radio
1997	Hiromi no All Night Nippon	NBS

=== Films ===
Year	Title	Role	Notes
1993	Nakayubi Hime: Ore Tacha Dō Naru?		
1997	30	Restaurant staff	
2006	Chōfu Kūkō		
2006	Charlotte's Web	Goose Gory	Japanese dub

=== Internet series ===
Year	Title	Website	Notes
2015	Hiromi no "Hiro wa Mada 50 Dakara"	Niconico Live	MC
2016	Hiromi no Bike Kaitai Show	Niconico Live	MC

=== Direct-to-video ===
Year	Title	Role	Notes
1991	Heisei Renai Daizukan Nihonichi Pants o Nuganai Otoko	Rokuro	Lead role
2003	Jitsuroku Nagoya Yakuza Sensō: Tōitsu e no Michi		

=== Advertisements ===
Title
Wilson Chō Bōsui
NTT DoCoMo Docomo no Info
Otsuka Pharmaceutical Pocari Sweat "Fupadamu"
Japan Energy
Sumitomo Bussan Links
SoftBank Mobile "Gotōji"
Toyo Suisan Hot Noodle
Toyota Corolla
Nihon Sports Shinkō Center Toto
Lion Corporation Smile Vin
Livedoor
Links
Rohto Pharmaceutical

== Works ==
=== DVD ===
Year	Title
2010	163 Channel Jiyūbito DVD: Restart Vol. 1

=== Discography ===
Year	Title
1996	"Furimuke"
2001	"Vintage"
2001	"Itte Koi No Chara"
2015	"Tomoyo"

== Bibliography ==
Year	Title
1994	Bibitten Janē yo! Bōzōzoku Renai-ron
1997	Hiromi no Snowboard Yarouze!!
2009	Jiyūbito: Hiromi-ryū Asobi no Kyōhon
2015	Īwake Shinai Ikikata
