= Brain Wall =

Japanese television franchise

Brain Wall (脳カベ, Nōkabe) is a component of the Japanese variety show The Tunnels' Thanks to Everyone. Video clips from the show proliferated on video-sharing websites and the concept was eventually adopted by several other countries. It became popularly known to non-Japanese speakers and YouTube fans as simply Human Tetris or Hole in the Wall, named for its involvement of the physical body and a supposed close resemblance to the rules of the video game Tetris.

== Game rules ==
The rules of the game are the same, and how points are awarded varies from country to country.

- Contestants wearing helmets and elbow and knee pads and a silver (or gold in some countries) spandex unitard stand on the "Play Area". A Styrofoam wall, 4 metres (13 ft) wide by 2.3 metres (7.5 ft) tall, consisting of cut-outs resembling Tetris blocks, is revealed and moves towards the contestants in a 15 metres (49 ft) path. They have to make use of their wits in seconds to assume the position that will allow them to fit through the opening(s). Later episodes involve the use of more complicated shapes, such as words, gymnastic positions, shapes from popular culture, and even above-ground-level shapes. Contestants usually have to twist and bend their bodies with agility and dexterity to fit through the hole in the wall. In several versions such as Cambodia and Vietnam, there was a round that featured a giant boxing glove shaped wall, while the players (who wore boxing costume) must complete a challenge presented by the show. If successful, the wall stops and the team earns points; otherwise, the wall pushed all players into the pool and the team receives no points.
- If contestants fail to fit through the hole, they are pushed by the wall into a pool of water that is 1.5 metres (4.9 ft) deep behind them and no points are awarded.
- Contestants play in teams and only win points if they are able to fit though the wall. Points are awarded if the contestant(s) in the round are able to successfully cross the Styrofoam wall completely, except in the following situations :
  - No points are awarded if any of the contestants fall into the water due to any reason, even if they successfully pass through the wall. (There have been instances where the wall is cleared but contestants find themselves trapped over the water)
  - No points are awarded if the contestants crash through the styrofoam wall causing it to break apart.

The first component of the game involves a solo contestant, while later components involve groups of two people or more.

== International versions ==
The production rights to the show outside Japan is owned by Fremantle and the program has been produced in over 45 countries.

Country	Name	Host	Network	First day aired
Albania	Sfida	Ilda Bejleri and Denard Xhillari	DigitAlb	2016
(Arab League) Arab world	جدار جبار; Jidar Jabbar	Mansour El Ghassani (Season 1, 2010)	Abu Dhabi TV	September 20, 2010
(Arab League) Arab world	جدار جبار; Jidar Jabbar	Said Al Memari (Season 2, 2011)	Abu Dhabi TV	September 20, 2010
Argentina	El muro infernal	Alejandro Wiebe	Telefe	March 3, 2008
Australia	Hole in the Wall	Jules Lund	Nine Network	August 6, 2008
Brazil	De cara no muro	Fausto Silva	Rede Globo	May 2009
Belgium (Flemish)	Hole in the Wall	Roos van Acker	VT4	September 2009
Bulgaria	Дупка в Стената; Dupka v Stenata	Rumen Lukanov	Nova TV	July 18, 2008
Cambodia	Hole in the Wall: ល្បែងជ្រែកជញ្ជាំង	Udom Vivath; Sarita Reth; VJ Anbe (2011–2013); Tim Ratha (2013–2015)	CTN (2011–2013); MyTV (2013–2015)	September 10, 2011
Canada (French)	Le mur	Benoît Gagnon	V	September 3, 2009
Chile	La muralla infernal	Javiera Contador and José Miguel Viñuela	Megavisión	2009
Chile	La muralla infernal	Fernando Godoy and Lucila Vit	Megavisión	2009
Croatia	Pazi, zid!	Mia Kovačić	Nova TV	2008
Colombia	Duro contra el mundo	Carlos Calero	RCN TV	February 4, 2008
Colombia	Duro contra el mundo	Maleja Restrepo	RCN TV	August 20, 2022
Costa Rica	Ojo con la pared	Nancy Dobles	Teletica	June 2, 2012
China	动洞墙	Zhu Zhen (朱楨) and Xue Zhi Qian (薛之謙)	SMG	
China	正大综艺-墙来啦	Qiang Zhi (人强子) and Xun Zhu (朱迅)	CCTV	September 19, 2010
Denmark	Hul i hovedet	Uffe Holm	TV3+	
Estonia	Auk Seinas	Tõnis Milling	TV3	Spring 2009
Egypt	الجدار الكبير; El-Giddar El-Kebir	Ahmed Essam	DMC	2020
Finland	Reikä seinässä	Mari Kakko	Nelonen	March 15, 2009
France	Le Mur Infernal	Laurence Boccolini	TMC	November 12, 2007
Germany	Ab Durch die Wand	Sonja Zietlow and Dirk Bach	RTL	October 18, 2009
Greece	Μια τρύπα στο νερό Mia trypa sto neró	George Pyrpasopoulos	Mega TV	December 13, 2008
Hong Kong	大咕窿	Yishan Ng; Calinda Yuen-wai Chan; Dickson Wong	TVB Jade	May 9, 2009
Hungary	Kalandra fal!	Balázs Sebestyén and János Vadon and Majka and Joci Pápai and Bence Istenes	RTL	May 4, 2009
India	Hole in the Wall	Cyrus Sahukar	Pogo	July 28, 2008
Indonesia	Hole in the Wall	Pandji Pragiwaksono	RCTI	December 17, 2007
Indonesia	Hole in the Wall	Steny Agustaf (Mom Edition)	RCTI	2008
Indonesia	Hole in the Wall	Indra Herlambang	RCTI	June 26, 2023
Indonesia	Hole in the Wall	Yossi Mokalu; Udjo Permato	Global TV	February 27, 2009
Israel	ראש בקיר; Rosh Bakir	Shai Goldstein and Daror Rafaeli	Channel 10	2008
Japan	脳カベ; Nōkabe	Tunnels, Toshihiro Itō and Asami Miura (servant)	Fuji TV	July 26, 2006
Lithuania	Skylė sienoje	Aistė Paškevičiūtė and Džiugas Siaurusaitis	TV3	2008
Malaysia	Bolos	Zizan Razak	Astro Ria	2008
Mexico	Aguas con el muro	Martín Altomaro and María Inés	Azteca Trece	May 11, 2008
Netherlands	Hole in the wall	Beau van Erven Dorens and Gerard Joling	SBS6	October 10, 2009
Norway	Ylvis møter veggen	Kjetil André Aamodt and Kjersti Idem along with Ylvis	TVNorge	September 15, 2008
Paraguay	El muro	Roberto Willis	Canal 13	November 2008
Peru	Tecsuperate	George Slebi	Panamericana Televisión	June 2009
Philippines	Hole in the Wall	Ogie Alcasid and Michael V.	GMA Network	April 20, 2009
Poland	Hole in the Wall	Adam Małczyk, Adam Grzanka and Michał Pałubski	TV4	March 7, 2009
Portugal	Salve-se Quem Puder	Diana Chaves and Marco Horácio	SIC and SIC K	June 1, 2009
Romania	Vedete-n Figuri	Dan Fintescu and Dina Marina	Prima TV	January 16, 2009
Russia	Стенка на стенку Stenka na Stenku	Vasily Utkin, Gennady Bachinsky and Sergey Stillavin (2007); Ivan Urgant and Alexander Tsekalo (2007–2008)	Channel One	October 6, 2007
South Korea	지화자; Jiwhaza	Choi Gwi-hwan	SBS	April 14, 2007
Spain	El Muro Infernal	Julian Iantzi	La Sexta	July 4, 2008
Sweden	Hål i väggen	Johan Petersson (Season 1, 2008); Erik Ekstrand, Mackan Edlund (Season 2, 2009-2010)	TV6	September 14, 2008
Taiwan	齊天大勝; Who's the Winner; Topic: Hole in the Wall 爆衝型人	Jacky Wu	TTV	June 16, 2007 – September 29, 2007
Thailand	เกมกำแพงซ่า; Game-Kampang-Zaa; Crazy Wall Game	Kanchai Kamnerdploy (September 3, 2011 – March 24, 2012)	Channel 7	September 3, 2011
Thailand	เกมกำแพงซ่า; Game-Kampang-Zaa; Crazy Wall Game	Kanchai Kamnerdploy (September 3, 2011 – March 24, 2012)	Channel 7	2012
Thailand	เกมกำแพงซ่า; Game-Kampang-Zaa; Crazy Wall Game	Wattana Kumthorntip (March 25, 2012 – March 30, 2014); Somjit Jongjohor (October 13, 2012 – March 30, 2014)	Channel 7	2012
Thailand	เกมกําแพงซ่า น็อกเอาท์ Game-Kampang-Zaa-Knockout; Crazy Wall Knockout Game	Wattana Kumthorntip (March 25, 2012 – March 30, 2014); Somjit Jongjohor (October 13, 2012 – March 30, 2014)	Channel 7	2012
Thailand	เกมกําแพงซ่า น็อกเอาท์ Game-Kampang-Zaa-Knockout; Crazy Wall Knockout Game	Wattana Kumthorntip (March 25, 2012 – March 30, 2014); Somjit Jongjohor (October 13, 2012 – March 30, 2014)	Channel 7	2013
Thailand	เกมกำแพงซ่า สไตรค์ Game-Kampang-Zaa-Strike; Crazy Wall Strike Game	Wattana Kumthorntip (March 25, 2012 – March 30, 2014); Somjit Jongjohor (October 13, 2012 – March 30, 2014)	Channel 7	2013
Thailand	เกมกำแพงซ่า สไตรค์ Game-Kampang-Zaa-Strike; Crazy Wall Strike Game	Wattana Kumthorntip (March 25, 2012 – March 30, 2014); Somjit Jongjohor (October 13, 2012 – March 30, 2014)	Channel 7	2014
Turkey	Bak Şu Duvara	Behzat Uygur	Star TV	2009
Ukraine	Море по коліно More po kolino	Dmytro Perepelkin	ICTV	August 29, 2010
United Kingdom	Hole in the Wall	Dale Winton	BBC One	September 20, 2008
United Kingdom	Hole in the Wall	Anton du Beke	BBC One	September 26, 2009
United States	Hole in the Wall	Brooke Burns and Mark Thompson	FOX	September 7, 2008
United States	Hole in the Wall	Teck Holmes	Cartoon Network	October 6, 2010
Uruguay	El Muro	Roberto Larrañaga	Canal 10	December 2008
Vietnam	Người đi xuyên tường	Hoài Linh and Đại Nghĩa (Season 1 and 2); Nguyên Khang (Season 3 and 4); Liêu Hạ Trinh (Season 3); Diệu Nhi (Season 4)	VTV3	December 26, 2014
Vietnam	Người đi xuyên tường nhí (Kids version)	Ốc Thanh Vân and Đình Toàn	HTV7	July 2017
