= Yazima Beauty Salon =

Japanese comedy musical group

Yazima Beauty Salon (矢島美容室, Yajima Biyō Shitsu)
- Origin: Japan
- Genres: J-pop
- Years active: 2008–2010
- Label: avex trax
- Members: Margaret Camelia Yazima; Naomi Camelia Yazima; Strawberry Camelia Yazima

Yazima Beauty Salon (矢島美容室, Yajima Biyō Shitsu) was a Japanese vocal group consisting of DJ Ozma and the owarai group Tunnels in character and in drag depicting a group of women they found scouting for talent in Las Vegas, Nevada. The group is on the Avex Trax label.

== Members ==
Margaret Camellia Yazima (マーガレット・カメリア・ヤジマ, Māgaretto Kameria Yajima)
The 36-year-old matriarch of the Yazima family portrayed by Noritake Kinashi (木梨 憲武, Kinashi Noritake) worked as a nude dancer in Las Vegas before being "discovered" by DJ Ozma and the Tunnels. She has been working as a dancer since she was 19. In Japanese, her name is written as Margaret Yazima (矢島マーガレット, Yajima Māgaretto).
Naomi Camellia Yazima (ナオミ・カメリア・ヤジマ, Naomi Kameria Yajima)
The blond 18-year-old (originally 17-year-old) daughter of the Yazima family portrayed by DJ Ozma who reluctantly worked with her mother as a dancer before being "discovered" by DJ Ozma and the Tunnels. She "mastered" the Japanese language soon within her "arrival" in Japan, unlike her mother. In Japanese, her name is written as Naomi Yazima (矢島ナオミ, Yajima Naomi) although she signs as Naomi (直美).
Strawberry Camellia Yazima (ストロベリー・カメリア・ヤジマ, Sutoroberī Kameria Yajima)
The 12-year-old (originally 11-year-old) daughter of the Yazima family portrayed by Takaaki Ishibashi (石橋 貴明, Ishibashi Takaaki) who constantly seeks out her father by calling out "Papa! Daddy!" (「パパ!ダディ!」, "Papa! Dadi!"). She is the only flat-chested member of the group due to her "age" but has extensive armpit hair and wears her hair in an afro. In Japanese, her name is written as Strawberry Yazima (矢島ストロベリー, Yajima Sutoroberī).

== Discography ==
=== Singles ===
1. "Nihon no Mikata -Nevada Kara Kimashita-" (ニホンノミカタ－ネバダカラキマシタ－, Nihon no Mikata -Nebada Kara Kimashita-; translated as "Friends of Japan -We Come From Nevada-") - October 29, 2008
  - The group's debut single peaked at #3 on the Oricon Weekly Charts and subsequently was certified as a gold record by the Recording Industry Association of Japan in November. The song went on to become the #2 requested song in karaoke parlors for 2008, between Shuchishin's debut single at #1 and GReeeeN's "Kiseki" at #3. The song was also used in a commercial for Lotte's SPASH chewing gum and it ranked as the #3 best song to appear in a commercial, after Orange Range's "Oshare Banchou feat. Soy Sauce" for Glico's Pocky at #1 and Arashi's "Boku ga Boku no Subete" for KDDI's au BOX. The song is also included in the "Nanairo no Nico Nico Douga" medley.
  - The single sold over 140,000 copies.
2. "SAKURA -Haru o Utawa Nevada-" (SAKURA－ハルヲウタワネバダ－, Sakura -Haru o Utawa Nebada-; translated as "Cherry Blossom -A Nevada Spring Song-") - March 25, 2009
  - The highest "SAKURA -Haru o Uta wa Nevada-" reached on the Oricon was #5 for the weekly rankings. It reached #14 for April 2009's monthly rankings. The song is akin to other sakura-themed songs released in Japan during the time of the trees' blooming.
  - So far the single has sold 34,179 copies.
3. "Hamaguri Bomber" (はまぐりボンバー, Hamaguri Bonbā; translated as "Common Orient Clam Bomber") - July 8, 2009
  - This new single was advertised as a summertime hit, singing about the beach and other summer activities.
  - The single was ranked as #9 on the weekly Oricon chart and has sold a total of 25,116 copies.
4. "Megami no Chikara" (メガミノチカラ; translated as "The Power of Megami (Goddess)") - February 10, 2010
  - The song is performed in a disco style. On the cover, the three members appear as golden Liberties.
  - Peaking at #12, the single sold 9,012 copies according to the Oricon chart.
5. "Idol Mitai ni Utawasete" (アイドルみたいに歌わせて, Aidoru Mitai ni Utawasete; "Let Me Sing Like an Idol") - April 21, 2010
  - This song is to be used as the theme song for their debut film and features Seiko Matsuda as a featured vocalist and credited as "Princess Seiko" (プリンセス・セイコ, Purinsesu Seiko).
  1. "Idol Mitai ni Utawasete"
  2. "Idol Mitai ni Utawasete (KARAOKE)"
  3. "Idol Mitai ni Utawasete (Princess Seiko de Utaou! ver. (プリンセス・セイコで歌おう! ver., Purinsesu Seiko de Utaou! ver.; Sing as Princess Seiko! ver.))
  4. "Idol Mitai ni Utawasete (Margaret de Utaou! ver.)"
  5. "Idol Mitai ni Utawasete (Strawberry de Utaou! ver.)"
  6. "Idol Mitai ni Utawasete (Naomi de Utaou! ver.)"
  7. "Idol Mitai ni Utawasete (Yazima Beauty Salon de Utaou! ver.)"

=== Albums ===
1. Okayui Tokoro wa Gozaimasen ka? (おかゆいところはございませんか?; lit. "Do You Have an Itchy Spot?"; a common phrase of a hairdresser when shampooing) - March 3, 2010
  - CD
    1. "Nihon no Mikata -Nevada Kara Kimashita-"
    2. "Megami no Chikara"
    3. "YAZIMA Damashii -Okayui Tokoro wa Gozaimasen ka-" (YAZIMA魂 -おかゆいところはございませんか-; "Yazima Soul -Do You Have an Itchy Spot?")
    4. "mama ni Zettai Koishiteru" (mamaに絶対恋してる; "I Absolutely Love Mama")
    5. "Ichigo Tsubutsubu ROCK'N'ROLL" (イチゴ ツブツブ ROCK’N’ROLL; "Strawberry, Lumpy Rock'N'Roll")
    6. "Naomi no Yume" (ナオミの夢; "Naomi's Dream")
    7. "Tsume no Saki Made Anata Datta" (爪の先まであなただった; "To the Tip of Your Nails")
    8. "Hamaguri Bomber"
    9. "SAKURA -Haru o Utawa Nevada-"
    10. "Nihonjin ni Naritai" (ニホンジンニナリタイ; "What Japanese are Made Of")
    11. "MURI -Jitsu wa Eigo ga Hanasenai-" (ジツハエイゴガハナセナイ; "Impossible -The Truth is We Can't Speak English-")
  - DVD
    1. "Nihon no Mikata -Nevada Kara Kimashita-" Music Video
    2. "SAKURA -Haru o Utawa Nevada-" Music Video
    3. "Hamaguri Bomber" Music Video
    4. "Megami no Chikara" Music Video
    5. "Yazima Dance Studio -Dance Lession Video-" (矢島舞踏室 -Dance Lesson Video-, Yajima Butō Shitsu -Dance Lesson Video-)

=== Soundtracks ===
1. Yazima Beauty Salon The Movie Music Album (矢島美容室 THE MOVIE MUSIC ALBUM, Yajima Biyō Shitsu Za Mūbī Myūjikku Arubamu) - April 28, 2010
  1. "Land On The Earth"
  2. "MIRACLE" - Yazima Beauty Salon
  3. "Place In Your Heart" - Aisa
  4. "Beautiful Morning"
  5. "Amazing Angel" - Lionel Ritchio (ライオネル・リチ男, Raioneru Richio; Takaaki Ishibashi)
  6. "Blow"
  7. "Waiting For Love" - Nine Mackenzie (ニーヌ・マッケンジー, Nīnu Makkenjī; DJ Ozma)
  8. "Sweet Seventeen" - Nine Mackenzie
  9. "Jealousy"
  10. "Sweet My Friend"
  11. "Eiga Mitai na Koishitai" (映画みたいな恋したい; "Love You Like a Movie") - Yazima Beauty Salon
  12. "Ultimate Choice"
  13. "Half Moon" - BRIGHT
  14. "Memories"
  15. "Margaret Starting!"
  16. "Naomi Run Away"
  17. "don't cry strawberry" - Strawberry
  18. "Cocktail for Tonight"
  19. "Raspberry Starting!"
  20. "Long to visit Tokyo"
  21. "Princess SEIKO"
  22. "Flower of Stage"
  23. "Naomi Starting!"
  24. "Daddy! Come Back!"
  25. "Departure"
  26. "Second Coming of Strawberry"
  27. "Pink no Bomber" (ピンクのボンバー, Pinku no Bonbā) - Yazima Beauty Salon
  28. "My Best Friend"
  29. "Sunshine Smile"
  30. "Nihon no Mikata -Nevada Kara Kimashita-" - Yazima Beauty Salon
  31. "Idol Mitai ni Utawaste" - Yazima Beauty Salon feat. Princess Seiko (Seiko Matsuda)

== Film ==
A film titled Yazima Beauty Salon The Movie: Reaching a Nevada Dream (矢島美容室 THE MOVIE ～夢をつかまネバダ～, Yajima Biyō Shitsu THE MOVIE ~Yume o Tsukama Nebada~) was released on April 29, 2010. The film describes the "history" of the band as they win a talent contest and then travel to Japan to find Margaret's husband and the girls' father Tokujirō (徳次郎). Other than the band (Takaaki Ishibashi, Noritake Kinashi, DJ Ozma), the film also stars Meisa Kuroki, Yusuke Yamamoto, Ayaka Wilson, Kazuma Sano, Dante Carver, Kanako Yanagihara, Atsushi Itō, Kaba.chan, Yutaka Mizutani, Ren Osugi, Seiko Matsuda, Fuji Television announcer Toshiyuki Makihara, among others. There were also special Hello Kitty as caricatures of the band produced for the film.
