= Jiwhaza =

2007 South Korean game show

- Hangul: 작렬! 정신통일
- Hanja: 炸裂! 精神統一
- RR: Jangnyeol! Jeongsintongil
- MR: Changnyŏl! Chŏngsint'ongil

Jiwhaza, also known as Burst! Mental concentration (작렬! 정신통일), was a South Korean game show known mainly for its oddball humor. It was broadcast in 90-minute episodes on Seoul Broadcasting System (SBS) every Saturday from April 14, 2007, to September 15, 2007.

The show was hosted by the SBS announcer Choi Gwi-hwan and had two teams of celebrity contestants, each captained by regulars Hyun Young and Kim Yong-man. It was divided into a series of loosely scripted challenges; the team with the winning final score would take "Jeongshin Tongil gwan" ("정신통일관") for that episode. Guests on the teams included Tablo, Chae Yeon, Tei, Bada, various members of Shinhwa, DBSK, CSJH, SNSD, Fly to the Sky and Super Junior.

A regular segment on the show was "the wall", an adaptation of the Brain Wall from the Japanese Tunnels game show. The segment had a moving wall advancing on a contestant standing at the edge of a pool of water. Contestants must jump, dodge or otherwise pass through a hole in the wall to avoid being knocked into the pool. Some of the more difficult walls required acrobatic skill to pass and used humorous cutouts of ballet poses, flying kicks and handstands.

Another regular segment (dropped towards the end of the series) was the "earthquake room", in which contestants on a padded platform were each given a pile of cushions. They were then asked to solve a series of visual puzzles, but could only give their answer while kneeling on a complete pile of cushions. This often resulted in tumblehouse slapstick because of the rocking motion of the platform and constant fighting over cushions; foam rocks were also thrown at the contestants and the platform tilted violently whenever a wrong answer was given.

The show suffered from poor ratings over its run and, despite frequent changes to its format by SBS writers, it was axed after 22 episodes.
