= Mamiko Takai =

Japanese idol from the eighties (born 1966)

- Born: December 28, 1966 (age 59); Obama, Fukui Prefecture, Japan
- Occupations: Singer, actress
- Spouse: Yasushi Akimoto (m. 1988)
- Children: 1

Mamiko Takai (高井麻巳子, Takai Mamiko, born December 28, 1966) is a Japanese idol from the eighties, who debuted in 1985 with the J-pop girl band Onyanko Club, and its first sub-group, duo Ushiroyubi Sasaregumi with her co-worker Yukiko Iwai. She quit those two bands in 1987, becoming a solo artist, and released four albums before marrying producer Yasushi Akimoto and subsequently retiring. Her older sister Masayo made her record debut in July 1986 as a part of a 20-member dance group named Dee-Dee (Dee-Dee). She has two other younger sisters.

== Biography ==
Takai's family owned a local bike shop. She played softball at Obama Municipal Junior High School (小浜市立小浜中学). After entering Fukui Prefectural Wakasa High School (福井県立若狭高校), she became popular among the students and was dubbed Miss Jakkō (ミス若高, Misu Jakkō) (Jakkō is an abbreviation for Wakasa High School). At that time, she dreamed of becoming an actress in the future. After graduating from high school, she moved to Tokyo to attend Joshibi Junior College. On April 15, 1985, she was approached by Katsunobu Itō (伊藤克信, Itō Katsunobu), a reporter for the variety show "Yūyake Nyan Nyan"(Sunset Meow Meow) (夕やけニャンニャン), while she was shopping in Harajuku. This led to an audition for that show, which was accepted, and she became a member of Onyanko Club. Note that since she already was affiliated with an entertainment agency, some say that her being approached in Harajuku was a staged act disguised as a coincidence. She became a center of attention as soon as she joined Onyanko Club because she was considered a legitimate beauty. In October 1985, she teamed up with Yukiko Iwai and made their record debut as Ushiroyubi Sasaregumi.

In June 1986, she made her solo debut with the song "Cinderella-tachi e no Dengon" (シンデレラたちへの伝言), which became number one on the Oricon chart in its first appearance. This song was very different from surrealistic novelty songs of Ushiroyubi Sasaregumi, and was a ballad with a calm and quiet tone. Since then, three more of her songs reached number one in a row. On July 6, 1986, a large-scale Handshake Event (握手会, Akushukai) was held at Osaka-jō Hall and she shook hands with 16,000 fans who gathered there. In October 1986, her radio program, Smiling Message (微笑伝言・ほほえみメッセージ, Bishōdengon Hohoemimessēji), was launched on Nippon Broadcasting System. In December 1986, Tōhō premiered the movie Women in love (恋する女たち), in which she co-starred with Yuki Saitō and Haruko Sagara. In this film she played the role of a fun-loving disco queen. In reality, however, she had never been to a disco, and her character was considered to be sober and reserved, the opposite of a playful person, which made her role terribly perplexing to her fans. She also starred in the idol dramas Daddy Longlegs (あしながおじさん, Ashinaga Ojisan) and Secret Half Moon (ないしょのハーフムーン, Naisho no Hāfumūn). In April 1987, she graduated from Onyanko Club along with Sayuri Kokushō, Aki Kihara, Rika Tatsumi, and Kazuko Utsumi (内海和子, Utsumi Kazuko). Along with this, Ushiroyubi Sasaregumi also disbanded. She mentioned that Onyanko Club's first concert, held at Hibiya Open-Air Concert Hall in October 1985, was one of the most memorable events for her as a member of the group.

She then became a solo singer and actress. She was oriented more toward acting than singing. As an actress, she appeared in dramas such as Wait until it's hot (熱くなるまで待って, Atsukunarumade Matte) and The stories of the snapping anchors (アナウンサーぷっつん物語, Anaunsā Puttsunmonogatari). In addition, she starred in the drama The Wizard of Oba (オバの魔法使い, Oba no Mahōtsukai). In July 1987, she released two videos: a feature-length promotional video titled Clockwork Fantômas (時計仕掛けの小悪魔(ファントマ), Tokeijikake no Fantoma) filmed in Southern Europe and a video titled Mamiko Takai First Concert DO・RA・MA (高井麻巳子ファースト・コンサート DO・RA・MA, Takai Mamiko Fāsuto Konsāto Dorama) featuring her first solo concert at NHK Hall in June of that year. She also published a photo book titled Soleil (ソレイユ, Soreiyu), taken in Southern Europe. On May 23, 1988, just three weeks after the official fan club was formed, she married Yasushi Akimoto and retired from the entertainment industry.

They then lived in New York for a year and a half. In March 2001, after 13 years of marriage, she finally had a baby girl. In the 2000s, she published three books of essays on food under the name of Mamiko Akimoto: Ordering for two people living together (二人暮らしのお取り寄せ, Futarigurashi no Otoriyose), Sweets to order at tea time (お茶の時間のお取り寄せ, Ocha no Jikan no Otoriyose), and Happy Orders (幸福のお取り寄せ, Kōfuku no Otoriyose). Moreover, in December 2002, she and her husband published a picture book titled Elephant Cat (ぞうネコ, Zouneko). In October 2013, they invited Shinzō Abe, then Prime Minister, to their home and served him dinner. She also became an statutory auditor of Yasushi Akimoto's office.

== Relationship with Yukiko Iwai ==
She and Yukiko Iwai, who were partnered in Ushiroyubi Sasaregumi, were said by those around them to be not on good terms with each other. However, at least in the early days, it is considered otherwise. They often took a cab home together after appearing on Yūyake Nyan Nyan at the time, since they were going home in the same direction. When Ushiroyubi Sasaregumi disbanded, they both said that it was a very pleasant memory and that they loved this subgroup. Kazuji Kasai, chief director of Yūyake Nyan Nyan, supervisor of Onyanko Club, explained the relationship between the two as follows. "This subgroup was originally formed by our decision without regard to their wishes. So it is true that there were differences in orientation between the two, but they were not as incompatible as they were said to be."

However, Iwai subsequently admitted on a TV program that she and Takai did not get along well. She mentioned that since they were in different groups, they spent little time together and had no conversations with each other outside of work. Iwai felt that Takai was privileged by Akimoto, which was also not amusing to her. Iwai made a curt comment about the successive marriages of Takai and Ruriko Nagata (永田ルリ子, Nagata Ruriko), saying that they should not have rushed into marriage since they were only 21 years old. Note that Eri Nitta, one of the most popular members of Onyanko Club, considered Takai to be one of her best friends. On the other hand, Takai herself recalled that when she was in Onyanko Club, there were no members she was particularly close to, and she was frequently alone.

== Takai's characteristics and Yasushi Akimoto ==
Many of Takai's fans interpreted her sudden marriage as Akimoto forcibly taking her away from them. Although they directed their uncontrollable anger toward Akimoto, sometimes even directly harassing him, they accepted this fact over time. In the summer of 1986, she was secretly being stalked by the paparazzi of the photo magazine Friday, which was brought to her attention by one of her most enthusiastic fans. She was also stalked by Akimoto when she and Aki Kihara went to see the movie Year of the Dragon at midnight. On this occasion, Akimoto approached Takai at the movie theater, feigning coincidence. On the other hand, actress Yuki Saitō, who admits to being Takai's close friend, In her collection of essays, About people whom I like (私の好きなあの人のコト, watashi no Sukina Anohitonokoto), she claimed that, contrary to popular perception, Takai was in fact actively courting Akimoto. He wrote many lyrics for the members of Onyanko Club, but only one song was written for her.

In addition, when Akimoto talked with her in the summer of 1986, he made the following comments about her. "She is naive because she was nurtured by the warm love of her family. Such characteristics of hers make her very clean image stand out in the greasy entertainment industry. While Sonoko Kawai and Eri Nitta will definitely have affairs, she will never commit adultery." In July 1985, when the members of Onyanko Club stayed at a hotel near Oiso Long Beach (大磯ロングビーチ) in Ōiso, Kanagawa, While all of them excitedly watched the pornographic videos, the "pure-hearted" Takai was the only one who was shocked into silence by them. She was considered by the members of Onyanko Club to be the most feminine of the group. Her plain, unassuming, ordinary manner was described as her greatest appeal. On the other hand, Akimoto and others described her as having an awkward and quirky side, despite her calm outward appearance.

== Singles ==
Year	Title	Details	Peak chart position (Oricon)
1986	"Cinderella-tachi e no Dengon" (シンデレラたちへの伝言)	Released: June 25, 1986; B-side: "Kowarekaketa Piano" (こわれかけたピアノ)	#1
1986	"Melody" (メロディ)	Released: September 21, 1986; B-side: "Toki no Tsugegoto" (時のつげごと)	#1
1986	"Yakusoku" (約束)	Released: December 21, 1986; B-side: "Haru wa Na Nomi" (春は名のみ)	#1
1987	"Kagerō" (かげろう)	Released: March 18, 1987; B-side: "Nemuri no Opera" (眠りのオペラ)	#1
1987	"Jōnetsu Rainbow" (情熱れいんぼう)	Released: June 10, 1987; B-side: "Yūgure no Piano" (夕暮れのピアノ)	#2
1987	"Usotsuki" (うそつき)	Released: September 21, 1987; B-side: "Jūgatsu no Tabibito" (十月の旅人)	#2
1987	"Tender Rain" (テンダー・レイン)	Released: December 16, 1987; B-side: "Hoshi no Seseragi" (星のせせらぎ)	#3
1988	"Komorebi no Season" (木洩れ陽のシーズン)	Released: April 6, 1988; B-side: "Kegarenaki Itazura" (汚れなき悪戯)	#12

== Albums ==
=== Studio albums ===
- Itoguchi (いとぐち) (1987)
- Kokoro Biyori (こころ日和) (1987)
- Watashi no Mama de... (私のままで…) (1988)
- Message (1988)

=== Compilation albums ===
- My Kore! (Myこれ!) series
  - My Kore! Ction: Takai Mamiko BEST (Myこれ!クション 高井麻巳子BEST) (2002)
  - My Kore! Lite: Takai Mamiko (Myこれ!Lite 高井麻巳子) (2010)
- Ushiroyubi Sasaregumi Uta no Daihyakka Sono 2: Takai Mamiko (うしろゆびさされ組★うたの大百科 その2 高井麻巳子) (2004)
- Takai Mamiko SINGLES Complete (高井麻巳子 SINGLESコンプリート) (2004)

== Videos ==
- 高井麻巳子ファースト・コンサート DO・RA・MA [Mamiko Takai First Concert DO・RA・MA] (Videotape) (in Japanese). Tokyo, Japan: Pony Canyon. 1987-07-21.
- 時計仕掛けの小悪魔(ファントマ) [Clockwork Fantômas] (Videotape) (in Japanese). Tokyo, Japan: Pony Canyon. 1987-07-05.
