= Trygve Thue =

Norwegian guitarist and music producer (1950–2022)

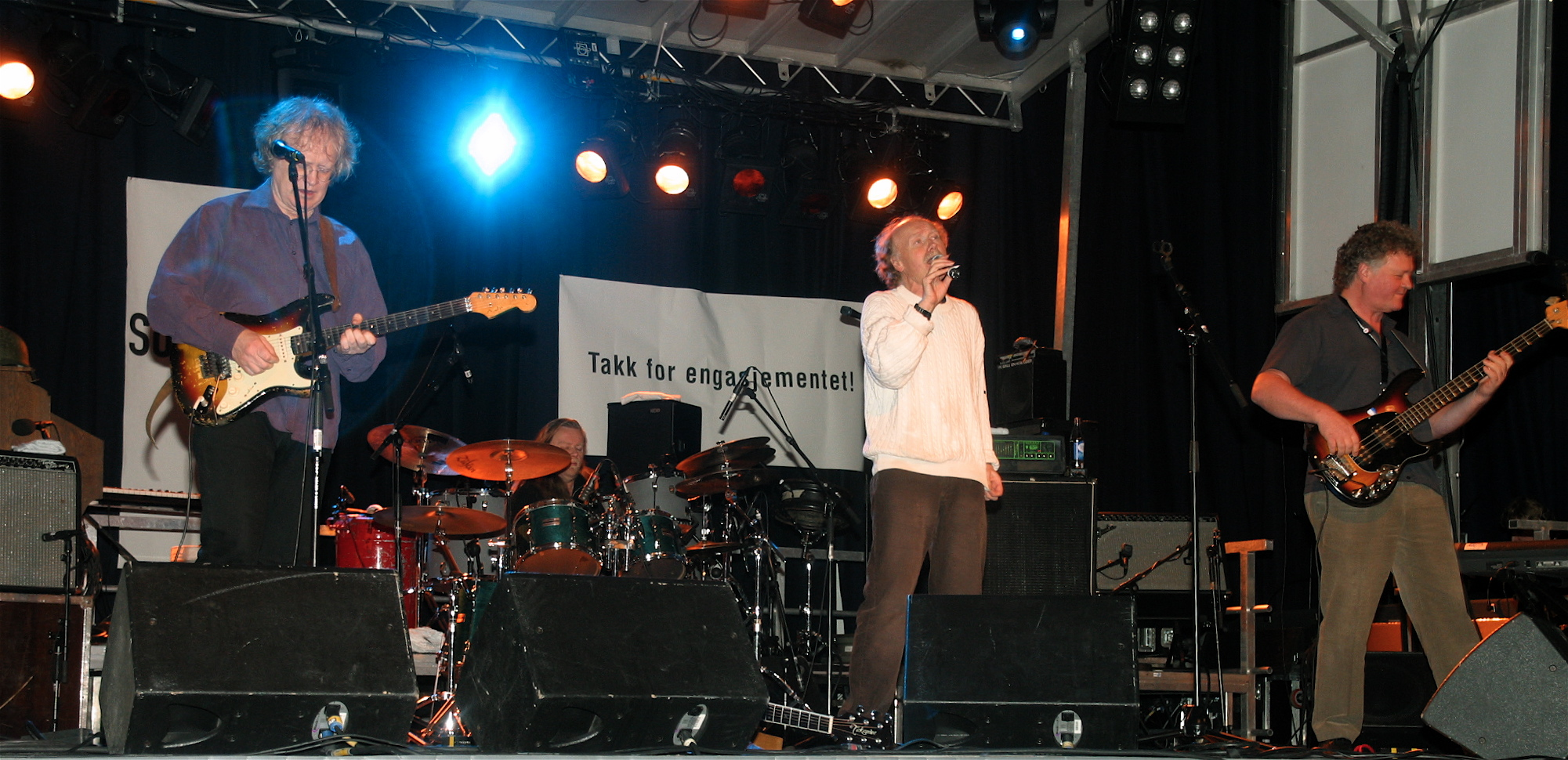
- Thue with Saft in 2005; Photo by Nina Aldin Thune

Background information
- Born: 21 June 1950; Bergen, Hordaland, Norway
- Origin: Norway
- Died: 14 April 2022 (aged 71)
- Genres: Rock, pop music
- Occupations: Musician, composer
- Instruments: Guitar, vocals
- Labels: Tylden & Co

Trygve Thue (21 June 1950 – 14 April 2022) was a Norwegian guitarist and music producer, and an original member of the Norwegian band Saft. He was the brother of the folk singer Ove Thue.

== Career ==
Thue was born in Bergen and received his first musical accolades with "Freeze on His Back" in the boys choir Folkeskolens Guttekor in 1958 in Bergen. His background as choir boy often gave him a competitive advantage in polyphonic singing and instrumental harmonies, a result of his many hours in the studio making albums such as Jan Eggum's "En Natt Forbi" and "Bare Nerver" in which he both wrote and sang the voices in the choir.

From 1976 and onwards he ran his own studio, Bergen Lydstudio, where he produced records for artists like Bjørn Eidsvåg, Jan Eggum, Johannes Kleppevik, Nurk Twins, Hole in the Wall, Cactus, Ivar Medaas, Sissel Kyrkjebø, Knutsen & Ludvigsen, Gustav Lorentzen, Lollipop, Ole Paus, Bergen Blues Band, Rolv Wesenlund and Harald Heide-Steen Jr., Ole Amund Gjersvik, Mads Eriksen, Rune Larsen and Fabel . In addition, he recorded the Magna Carta album Live in Bergen 1978, and around 200 other albums.

== Discography (a selection) ==
Solo albums

- 1975: Brødrene Thue (RCA Victor)
- 1994: Jeg – En Beach Boy (Tylden & Co)

Collaborations

Within Saft

- 1971: Saft (Polydor Records)
- 1971: Horn (Polydor Records)
- 1973: Stev, Sull, Rock & Rull (Philips Records)

Within Hole in the Wall

- 1972: Hole in the Wall (Sonet Records)

With Jan Eggum

- 1975: Jan Eggum (CBS Records)
- 1976: Trubadur (CBS Records)

Within The Lollipops

- 1989: Lollipop (Mariann Records), with Rune Larsen and Tor Endresen
- 1990: Lollipop 2 (Mariann Records), with Rune Larsen, Tor Endresen and Karoline Krüger
- 1991: Lollipop Jukebox (Lollipop Records)

Within Bergen Blues Band

- 2010: The Best of Bergen Blues Band (Hungry Records)
