= Hole in the Wall Gang (disambiguation) =

The Hole in the Wall Gang was an outlaw gang in the American Wild West.

"Hole in the Wall Gang" can also refer to:

- Hole in the Wall Gang (comedy), a Northern Irish comedy group
- The Hole in the Wall Gang, a group of Las Vegas criminals in the 1970s and 80s formed by Anthony Spilotro
- Hole in the Wall Gang Camp, a summer camp for children with serious illnesses

== See also ==
- Hole in the Wall (disambiguation)
