= Erik Moll =

- Born: Erik Møll; 7 September 1948 (age 77); Wisconsin, US
- Origin: Norway
- Occupations: Singer, songwriter, composer
- Instruments: Guitar, vocals
- Labels: EMM Records; Fire Ant Records; Sonet Records
- Website: www.erikmoll.com

Erik Moll (born 7 September 1948) is an American-born Norwegian-singer-songwriter, inspired by the tradition-based styles such as traditional folk, country, blues, swing, gypsy, tex-mex, calypso and rock music.

== Biography ==
Moll moved to Bergen, Norway in 1961, picked up the guitar, and started writing his own songs. He performed his music on local bars and venues in Bergen in the 1960s. In the 1970s he started the Bergen-based band Hole in the Wall together with his friend Rune Walle. They released the self-titled debut album in 1972. From 1973 he was four years in California joining in with the bands «Happy Valley» and «The Remnants». Back in Norway he organized a new edition of the «Hole in the Wall» and the second album Rose Of Barcelona (1979) was released.

In the 1980s he joined the Norwegian band «NRI» in Copenhagen, had his own «Erik Moll Band», led the Bergen calypso group «Bolingo» (with a self-titled single in 1983), played a lot of solo concerts, and also established the hitherto latest edition of the «Hole in the Wall». He was part of Norway's first performance of the musical Hair at the National Theatre (1970), and has participated in several plays, movies and television commercials in addition to playing concerts, festivals, clubs, TV appearances and radio broadcasts in Norway and elsewhere.

The 1990s he was in Austin, Texas, where he wrote songs for Rita Eriksen, Lynni Treekrem and several other Norwegian artists. In Texas, he appeared locally and released four albums on his own label two of which also is distributed in Scandinavia. He toured southern Norway in 1999 with trio from Austin and then moved back to Bergen. He also picked up the collaboration with former «Hole in the Wall» band member, Arve Håland and is leading the band «Texanos» in addition to the solo career.

Moll has been heater for a number of famous artists such as Willie Nelson, Taj Mahal, New Riders of the Purple Sage, Rick Danko, Tom Paxton, Loudon Wainwright and Stephen Grossman. He is also involved in a number of compilations from both the United States and Norway.

== Honors ==
- 2015: Spellemannprisen in the Country category for the album Many Years To Go

== Discography (in selection) ==
=== Solo albums ===
- 1982: Crazy Lovin’ (Royton)
- 1988: Wayward Ways (EMM Records)
- 1994: In The Shadow (Fire Ant Records)
- 1998: Most Of All (Fire Ant Records)
- 2003: Come What May (EMM Records)
- 2008: Good To Go (EMM Records)
- 2010: Fram Til I Dag (EMM Records)
- 2015: Many Years To Go (EMM Records)

=== Collaborations ===
Within Hole in the Wall

- 1972: Hole in the Wall (Sonet Records)
- 1978: Rose Of Barcelona (Mercury Records)

With Erik Hokkanen

- 1992: Erik & Erik (Fire Ant Records)
