= Utaban =

Japanese television series

Utaban (うたばん) was a Japanese music variety show, broadcast weekly from October 15, 1996 until March 23, 2010 on TBS and its affiliates. The name of the show is an abbreviation of "uta bangumi" (歌番組), meaning "music program". A special version of the show, running for two hours, was occasionally aired under the name Tokuban (とくばん), an abbreviation of "tokubetsu bangumi" (特別番組), meaning "special program".

The show's theme song, played during the opening sequence and closing credits, was "These Boots Are Made for Walkin'" by Nancy Sinatra.

== History ==
The show was first broadcast on October 16, 1996. Originally supposed to be called "J-Pop Hour", it was hosted by Takaaki Ishibashi, of comedy duo Tunnels, and Masahiro Nakai, leader of boy band SMAP. Hello! Project idol group Morning Musume were frequent guests on the show, at one point appearing almost weekly.

Nakai was briefly replaced by TBS announcer Shin'ichirō Azumi in late June 2006, due to conjunctivitis.

After 13 and a half years on air, the show made its final broadcast on March 23, 2010. It was reformatted into a new show called The Music Hour (ザ・ミュージックアワー), also hosted by Ishibashi and Nakai, which aired on TBS from April 20 to September 14, 2010.

== Performers ==
=== Moderators (MC) ===
- Takaaki Ishibashi
- Masahiro Nakai

=== Others ===
- Shinji Suzuki (鈴木 慎治; Kagaku-kun (化学くん))
- Kō Chūbachi (中鉢 功; Bachikō (鉢功), Chū-chan (中ちゃん))
- Ayu Yamanouchi (山内 あゆ; a TBS announcer)
