= Tonneruzu no Minasan no Okage deshita =

Japanese variety show, 1997–2018

- Also known as: The Tunnels' Thanks to Everyone
- Japanese: とんねるずのみなさんのおかげでした
- Presented by: Tunnels; Toshihiro Itō
- Country of origin: Japan
- Original language: Japanese

Production
- Running time: 54 minutes
- Production company: Fuji Television

Original release
- Network: FNS (Fuji TV)
- Release: June 26, 1997 – March 22, 2018

Related
- とんねるずのみなさんのおかげです (Tonneruzu no Minasan no Okage desu) (1988—1997)

The Tunnels' Thanks to Everyone (とんねるずのみなさんのおかげでした, Tonneruzu no Minasan no Okage deshita) is a Japanese television variety and game show that aired on Fuji Television in Japan, starring the Japanese owarai duo Tunnels. It is the origin of the international Brain Wall television franchise, and the J-pop group Yaen.

== Recurring segments ==
=== Pit drops ===
The premise of the dokkiri segment is unsuspecting victims on a golf course falling into large hidden traps, which then in turn is scored as a golf game by Takaaki Ishibashi's host "AO-Ki" (a play on Isao Aoki's name) based on how spectacular the fall was. Starting with the fourth season, the golf setting was exchanged to waterfronts, with the goal being getting the targets into the water.
