= Hole in the Wall (Vietnamese game show) =

Vietnamese game show

- Vietnamese: Người đi xuyên tường
- Genre: Game show
- Based on: Brain Wall, part of The Tunnels' Thanks to Everyone by Fuji TV
- Directed by: Nguyễn Ngọc Phú
- Presented by: Hoài Linh; Đại Nghĩa; Nguyên Khang; Liêu Hà Trinh; Diệu Nhi
- Country of origin: Vietnam
- Original language: Vietnamese
- No. of seasons: 4
- No. of episodes: 71

Production
- Executive producers: Lại Văn Sâm; Nguyễn Tùng Chi; Tạ Bích Loan
- Producer: Nguyễn Hồng Hạnh
- Running time: 1 hour
- Production company: Vietba Media

Original release
- Network: VTV3
- Release: December 26, 2014 – January 9, 2020

Hole in the Wall Vietnam (Vietnamese: Người đi xuyên tường) was a game show that first aired on 26 December 2014. The show was based on the Japanese game show Nōkabe (脳カベ) (meaning Brain Wall), in which players must contort themselves to fit through cutout holes of varying shapes in a large polystyrene wall moving towards them as they stand in front of a swimming pool. The final episode aired on January 9, 2020.

In the first two seasons, comedian Hoài Linh and host Đại Nghĩa served as the original hosts. In the third season, they were replaced by two hosts Nguyên Khang and Liêu Hà Trinh. In the fourth season, Liêu Hà Trinh was replaced by actress and hostess Diệu Nhi.

In the first two seasons and the Kids version, two opposing teams face five challenges. The winning team faces an imposing wall in the final round. If they pass the wall, they win the game. When the show was revival as family version since the third season in 2018, the format was also modified, in which the Speed Wall and Winner Wall rounds were replaced by two Storm Wall rounds, thus the team with more points after all rounds was guaranteed as the winning team of this episode and won a guaranteed prize.

== Original version (VTV3, 2014-2016) ==
=== Gameplay ===
The game consists of two teams of three people. A hobby, occupation, or a location may serve as the team names. Two lifeguards — one male, and one female — sit poolside. The contestants wear silver Spandex zentai unitards and red or blue helmets, elbow pads and knee pads. Contestants must jump through the hole without breaking it and without falling into the water. At least one foot must be in the play area at all times. A replay is shown after each wall has passed. If a wall is not cleared, a diagram is shown of the best method. The game consists of five rounds: Solo Wall, Double Wall, Triple Wall, Speed Wall, and the Winner Wall.

==== Solo Wall ====
After each team is announced, the team captain enters the play area. After a three-second countdown, the wall is shown. If the captain fails to "clear" the wall, either by falling into the pool or damaging the wall as it passes, the team earns zero points. Clearing the wall earns ten points. The opposing team captain then tries a different wall.

==== Double Wall ====
The two non-captains on each team then compete on a Double Wall. If both players clear the wall, the team earns twenty points. If either player fails to clear, they earn zero points.

==== Triple Wall ====
The whole team competes in the Triple Wall. The team scores thirty points if all three clear the wall. If any player fails to clear, the team earns zero points.

==== Speed Wall ====
Depending on the type of challenge selected, a random number of players is chosen for the round. The wall moves twice as fast as before. If a team member falls into the pool or breaks a section of the wall, the team earns zero points. If they succeed, the team earns points dependent on the number of players in play. The winning team gets 10 million VND, while the losing team gets 5 million VND.

==== Extra Wall ====
If both teams tie, players compete in the bonus round to found the winning team.

==== Winner Wall ====
After four rounds, a number of members from the winning teams face the final challenge, which is also randomized. Before the final round, the winning team will make a bet ranging from 1 million VND to all of the winning cash. If they succeed, the winning team will earn bonus cash, depending on what they had bet. If not, they will lose the money that they used to bet. They also get a trophy at the end.

In the second season, the losing team can be make a bet. If the winning team won this round, the losing team also earn bonus cash too, otherwise they will lose the money that they used to bet if the winning team did not win this round.

== Kids version (HTV7, 2017) ==
Hole in the Wall Kids
- Vietnamese: Người đi xuyên tường nhí
- Genre: Game show
- Directed by: Nguyễn Ngọc Phú
- Presented by: Đình Toàn; Ốc Thanh Vân
- Country of origin: Vietnam
- Original language: Vietnamese
- No. of seasons: 1
- No. of episodes: 13

Production
- Executive producer: Ngô Hồng
- Producer: Nguyễn Hồng Hạnh
- Running time: 1 hour
- Production company: Vietba Media

Original release
- Network: HTV7
- Release: July 11 – October 3, 2017

Due to the success of the show, a spin-off children version called Người đi xuyên tường nhí (also known as Hole in the Wall Kids) was premiered in HTV7 from July 11 to October 3, 2017. Unlike the original version, the game consists of two teams of three children only. Đình Toàn and Ốc Thanh Vân served as two hosts of this children spin-off.

=== Gameplay ===
The format was similar to the original version, except that the betting bonus cash in the Winner Wall was removed.

==== Speed Wall ====
The round was the same, except the winning team gets 15 million VND, while the losing team gets 10 million VND.

==== Winner Wall ====
After four rounds, a number of members from the winning teams face the final challenge, which is also randomized. If they succeed, the winning team will earn 5 million VND bonus cash. If not, their guaranteed prize was remain the same. They also get a trophy at the end.

== Family version (VTV3, 2018-2020) ==
From 2018 to 2020, the show was revived in VTV3 as the family version, with some major changes of the format. Unlike the original version, two families of three members each play, similar to the Cartoon Network's revival of the US version. One member of each team is a child, and the second member must be the child's parent or guardian. The third member can either be one of the child's friends/siblings or a second parent/guardian. Also, in the last two rounds, the contestants wear red or blue shorts/dress and boxing gloves.

=== Gameplay ===
The first three rounds were similar to the original and kids versions. The major changes was the last two rounds, in which the Speed and Winner Wall were replaced by two Storm Wall rounds, thus making the single team bound round was officially removed. The team with more points after all rounds was guaranteed as the winning team of this episode and won a guaranteed prize.

==== Storm Wall ====
In two Storm Wall rounds, the polystyrene wall was replaced by a giant red boxing glove shaped wall with faster speed, while the players must complete a challenge presented by the show. The types of tasks featured in this round include solving puzzles, performing math problems, singing karaoke, and more. If successful, the wall stops and the team earns 60 points (90 points in the second Storm Wall round); otherwise, the wall pushed all players into the pool and the team receives no points.

After all rounds, the winning team gets 20 million VND and a trophy, while the losing team gets 10 million VND.

==== Extra Wall ====
The format was same as the original and kids version, except it was placed after the second Storm Wall round.
