= Carlos Calero =

Colombian television presenter

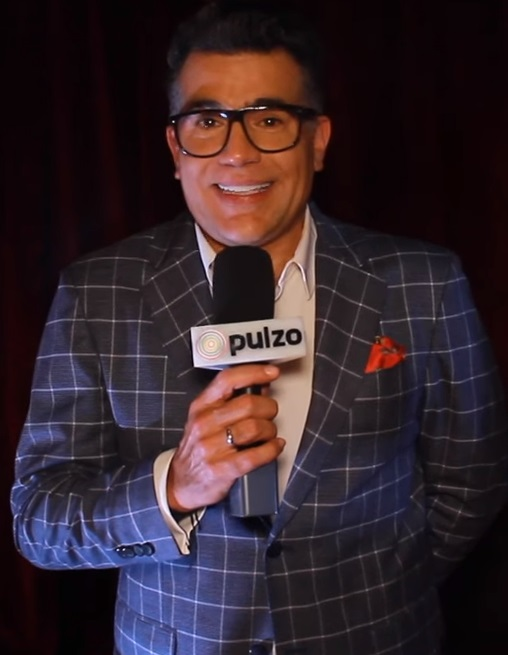
- Carlos Calero in 2022
- Born: Carlos Alberto Calero Salcedo; June 29, 1969 (age 57); Barranquilla, Colombia
- Education: Jorge Tadeo Lozano University
- Occupations: Presenter entertainer
- Years active: 1998–2016; 2018–Presente

Carlos Alberto Calero Salcedo (Barranquilla, Atlántico, June 29, 1969) is a Colombian host and presenter. He was consul of Colombia in San Francisco, United States, although at the end of 2017 the Administrative Court of Cundinamarca annulled decree 1617 of October 2016, by means of which the renowned presenter had been appointed as consul of Colombia in San Francisco.
