= Hole-in-the-Wall, Seaham Harbour =

Coordinates: 54°50′17″N 1°19′41″W

The Marquess of Londonderry proposed the building of a new harbour at a rocky inlet at Dalden Ness, Seaham, and work began in November 1828. Previously this rocky inlet was known by the locals as "the black hole". Mariners using the harbour colloquially referred to it as the "hole-in-the-wall" because it was hewn out of the actual cliffs unlike many typical harbour constructions. George Head in 1836 wrote "To a stranger casually passing this little harbour, appearances certainly indicate its thriving condition; the new south dock is already open and the staithes basin is a striking picture of the economy of space....The works are interesting owing to their dissimilarity from harbours in general, which are usually formed within a bight or bay. Here a bluff headland of limestone has been scooped hollow and as the cliffs are lofty, the vessels ride with their topgallant-mast heads below the summit".
