= The Hole in the Wall, Bodmin =

Pub in Bodmin, Cornwall

Coordinates: 50.471911°N 4.718811°W

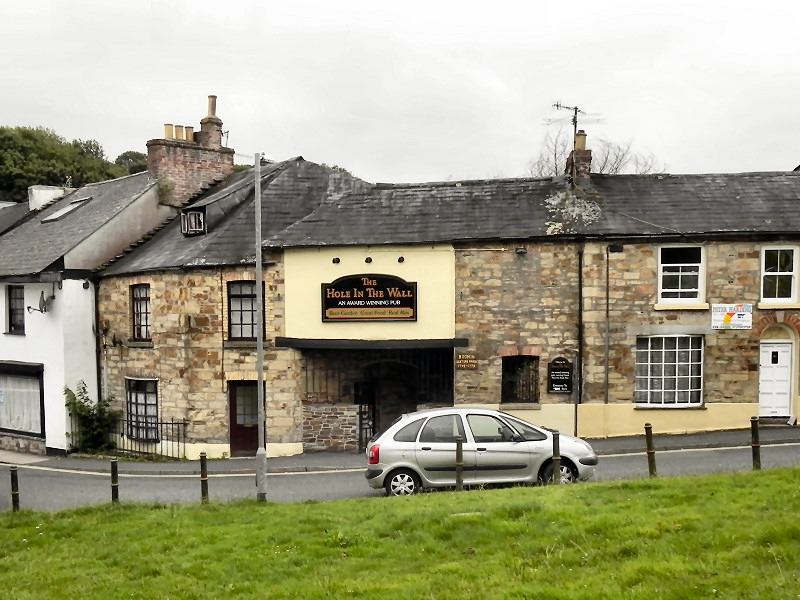
The Hole in the Wall pub in Bodmin, pictured in 2010

The Hole in the Wall is a pub in Bodmin, Cornwall, England. It has been awarded the Cornish Pub of the Year award by CAMRA three times.
