= Hole in the Wall (band) =

Hole In The Wall
- Origin: Bergen, Hordaland
- Genres: Country Rock, Rock, Country, Folk
- Years active: 1971–73, 1978-79, 1984-85
- Labels: Mercury Records; Sonet Records

Hole In The Wall (initiated 1971 in Bergen, Norway) was a Norwegian country rock band, established by Erik Moll and Rune Walle.

== Biography ==
From a historical perspective, the band can be placed among the pioneers of the Roots revival in Norway. The group existed in three different eras, with different musicians. The name of the group refers to a gang of outlaws in the US Wild West, which had taken its name from a remote mountain pass called Hole-in-the-Wall in the mountains Johnson County, Wyoming where the outlaws had their hideout.

The music was a mix of American country music, traditional folk music, psychedelia and rock'n'roll. The first album was innovative by Norwegian standards, and can be compared to the music of bands like Fairport Convention, Grateful Dead and Buffalo Springfield. One of the band members, Rune Walle, was later recruited to the Ozark Mountain Daredevils. Musicians of this first album was besides Moll, Walle and Thue, Anne Bolstad (fiddle and vocals), Ketil Sand (guitar), Arve Håland (accordion), Tom Sætre (guitar), Elisabeth Braarvig (cello), Jens Braarvig (bass) and Leif Jensen (drums). The music was composed by Moll and Walle, with Thue, Harald Are Lund and Nils Bjarne Kvam as producers.

The first lineup of Hole In The Wall was based on a group of Hippies living in a collective in Brgen. In 1972 the band was reorganized to a permanent lineup, but had split up by 1973. Thue along with Rune Walle, Kaare Øivind Moldestad and Gunnar Bergstrøm, started a new edition of Saft. Moll went back to US, his second home country, and was part of the Happy Valley String Band (1974-77). Life in California gave many great musical experiences, but not much in the way of earnings.

In 1978 Moll returned to Norway to form a new Hole In The Wall releasing a new album. Trygve Thue was producer for the second album Rose Of Barcelona (1978), where the material was composed by Moll. Thue also played lead guitar on the album together with other guests artists like Gunnar Bergstrøm (drums), Tom Harry Halvorsen (piano) and Magne Lunde (drums). The following year he was back in California, where he joined the band The Remnants, but again with no commercial success .

Moll formed a third edition of Hole In the Wall with his old friend Rune Walle, who had recently returned from the US, after playing six years with the band Ozark Mountain Daredevils. New music was composed, but no record companies would invest in the music that five years later was designated as Roots music. Hole In the Wall split once again, this time for good.

Moll left for the US again, changed his surname from Møll to Moll, and broke through as a solo artist and song writer for among others, Norwegian artist Steinar Albrigtsen. Walle continued on his own, while the other band members were conspicuous in many other contexts. Gundersen initiated the Gjøa Studio, and became one of key actors in the so-called Bergen Wave comprising artists like Sergeant Petter and Julian Berntzen, by the way the son of Lasse Berntzen, part of the 1978 lineup off Hole In the Wall.

== Band members ==
First lineup

- Erik Moll – vocals, guitar
- Rune Walle – vocals, guitar, piano
- Trygve Thue – lead guitar
- Harald Dyb – accordion
- Kaare Øivind Moldestad – bass
- Gunnar Bergstrøm – drums

Second lineup

- Erik Moll – vocals, guitar
- Lasse Berntzen – guitar, accordion
- Inge Glambek – mandolin, banjo, vocals
- Garmen de la Nuez – vocals, percussion
- Bjørn Aarland – bass
- Stein Nilsen – fiddle

Third lineup

- Erik Moll – vocals, guitar
- Rune Walle – vocals, guitar, piano
- Gunnar Bergstrøm – trommer
- Kåre Sandvik – piano
- Hans Petter Gundersen – gitarist
- Atle Mjørlaug – bassist

== Discography ==
- 1972: Hole In the Wall (Sonet Records)
- 1978: Rose Of Barcelona (Mercury Records)
