= DJ Ozma =

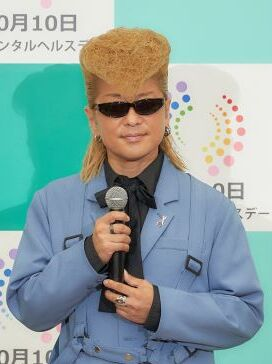
- Show Ayanocozey in 2023

Background information
- Also known as: DJ Ozma; Show Ayanocozey; Naomi Camellia Yazima
- Born: Nao Baba (馬場 直, Baba Nao); Roppongi, Tokyo, Japan
- Genres: Dance, pop, hip-hop
- Years active: As DJ Ozma: 2006 – 2008, 2011. As Show Ayanocozey: 1997 - present
- Label: EMI Music Japan to Avex Group
- Member of: Kishidan; Yazima Beauty Salon
- Website: www.dj-ozma.com

Nao Baba (Japanese: 馬場 直, Hepburn: Baba Nao), known professionally as DJ Ozma (stylized DJ OZMA) and legally as Sumitada Ozumano (尾妻野 純直, Ozumano Sumitada), is a Japanese pop singer and musical artist. He is also known as Show Ayanocozey of the rock band Kishidan and Naomi Camelia Yazima of the drag queen pop group Yazima Beauty Salon.

== Career ==
Ozma first came to prominence in early 2006 and is notorious for his performance at the 57th NHK Kōhaku Uta Gassen, during which his female dancers stripped themselves of their outer clothing on stage to reveal unitards painted to resemble the nude female body while wearing a patch resembling a mushroom which covered the genitals. The station had to later clarify, in light of complaints, that the dancers were clothed, despite their appearance. For this performance, Ozma received a lifetime ban from performing at the NHK.

During his three years of performing, DJ Ozma predominately covered other artists, usually K-Pop such as "Chō!" (超!), a cover of the song 가 (Go) by the late Korean pop singer U;Nee, and "One Night", a cover of the Korean song of the same name by DJ Doc. Ozma most frequently covered songs from the K-Pop group Koyote, including "Junjou ~Sunjon~", Ozma's version of "Sunjeong." Among Ozma's covers of songs originally by Japanese musicians, Ozma drew from hide's "Ever Free" and New RoTe'Ka's "DRINKIN' BOYS" which would be performed both live and in the music video with KING, Pancho, and other male dancers (but not Ozma himself) dancing in the nude, with red fans used to block their genitals. This music video has inspired numerous fan-made versions. Ozma would also cover his own songs from Kishidan with "Boys Bravo!", "Asa ga Kuru Tabi", "Koibito", and "One Night Carnival" serving as the B-Sides to the first four of Ozma's singles. Kishidan's "Sayonara December" (さよならDecember) was also covered in a completely different style for an album release. However, Kishidan could be said to have covered DJ Ozma when they performed the Ramones' Do You Remember Rock 'n' Roll Radio? live, a song that Ozma had originally covered as a bonus track for his final album.

Ozma did record original songs, mostly coming on the later albums. In late 2008, Ozma collaborated with Ravex on the song "I Rave U" as part of the 20th anniversary of the Avex Group Record Label, having just switched from Universal Music Japan to join Avex in September of that year. Several of Ozma's original songs became movie theme songs: "Lie-Lie-Lie" was used for Naruto Shippuden the Movie, "Ninkimono de Ikou!" for Crayon Shin-chan: The Storm Called: The Hero of Kinpoko, and "Masurao" for Mr. Tadano's Secret Mission: From Japan with Love.

DJ Ozma is better known in Japan for his performances as Show Ayanocozey (綾小路 翔, Ayanokōji Shō) in the rock band Kishidan, which utilized a retro Bōsōzoku image, and bizarre theatrics at concerts. Kishidan was first formed in 1997, but went on hiatus during the DJ Ozma years. The group came to prominence in the 2000s after releasing the now iconic song "One Night Carnival". Prior to Ozma's controversial NHK Kōhaku Uta Gassen performance, Kishidan was invited to perform "One Night Carnival" during two consecutive years. Ozma's other alter-ego was playing 16-year-old girl Naomi Camellia Yazima (ナオミ・キャメリア・矢島, Naomi Kyameria Yajima) in Yazima Beauty Salon. As Ayanocozey, he joined the promotional super-group FANTA, releasing the single "Fantastic Love".

== The DJ OZMA "Family" ==
When performing as DJ Ozma, he was backed up by Yaoh "KING" Junichi (Binetsu Danji's Teruya Hoshikuzu) who served as the second vocalist, and Pancho (Kishidan's Hikaru Saotome) who performed rap sections. The Ozma family also had a series of back up dancers:

The OZ-MAX, female vocalists and dancers, occasionally having solo songs: Ayami (Nakazato Ayami, a future member of SDN48), Miki, Mariko, Yukko, and Chiharu. The OZ-MAX originally numbered four, before Yukko was added making five, all of whom were formerly Kishidan backdancers. The OZ-MAX frequently had solo verses in songs, especially Ozma covers of Koyote songs which required female voices. The covers of "Boys Bravo!", "Koibito", and "PRISM" were all performed exclusively by the OZ-MAX, although "Boys Bravo!" was a solo for Ayami. Ayami, Mariko, and Yukko have continued to perform as Kishidan backdancers, but Miki and Chiharu had departed by the time DJ Ozma had "resurrected" in 2011.

The OZ-MATE, six male backup dancers: Mine, Mamoru, TSURU-G, Hiroki, Kochi, and Choleste (a.k.a. Cholesterol-kun).

The OZ-MANIACS, various other personalities: MC Korea (Nishikiori Junpei of Binetsu Danji), MC Maji, So What? Brothers (who replaced MC Maji after the Maji character left the group following the LUV-XURY tour), Takuya Noro, ODAWARA JOE (who was also Maki Seigo for the second generation DJ Ozma prank), etc.

== Retirement and Resurrection ==
While on tour for his third album in 2008, he announced that he would be retiring from performing as DJ Ozma. While the retirement of DJ Ozma was true, Ozma set up an elaborate hoax during his announcement press conference. He introduced Maki Seigo, a supposed part-time video store worker and friend from Ozma's past, and stated that Maki would continue on as a second generation of DJ Ozma in a "pure, correct and beautiful" way. Maki would be joined by Mine of the OZ-MATE, who would step into the part of Yaoh "Prince" Junichi, thereby replacing Yaoh "KING" Junichi as second vocalist. Pancho would remain on board as Pancho. One month later, at the farewell concert "Ozma Forever Forever Ozma" (OFFO), Maki was given a video introduction, and he awkwardly walked onstage in street clothes, addressing the audience briefly before being forced offstage as dancers began performing the song "Spiderman". Thus, the entire Maki announcement and subsequent plan for a second generation of DJ Ozma was revealed to be a prank.

Following the OFFO concert of December 13, 2008, the DJ Ozma persona "retired" on December 13, 2008, but he continued to perform as part of Yazima Beauty Salon, listed as its producer and its main lyricist, and reunited with Kishidan.

DJ Ozma was revived in December 2011 with the release of a new single, Chinkonka. This coincided with the Kishidan release of My Way a single cover to commemorate the 10th anniversary of Kishidan. In addition to competing for sales, a joint concert was held in late December, Kishidan vs DJ OZMA, to parody both the supposed rivalry of Ozma and Ayanocozey, and Ozma's denial that his two alter egos are the same people. Ayanocozey performed both his Kishidan and DJ Ozma alter egos (as did KING, Pancho, and the backdancers). However, in a callback to the OFFO concert, during sections where both Ayanocozey and Ozma appeared onstage and singing together, Ozma was played by Maki Seigo, who at one point, proclaimed again that he would step into a 2nd generation of DJ Ozma. Maki then immediately announced his retirement and, as was the case during OFFO, followed again by "Spiderman".

On November 17, 2013, Ozma (announcing it as Ayanocozey) admitted that Ayanocozey and Ozma were "the same character".

On December 12, 2020, it was announced that Ozma had tested positive for COVID-19.

== Discography ==
=== Albums ===
- I ♡ Party People (2006-11-15)
- I ♡ Party People 2 (2007-12-5)
- I ♡ Party People 3 (2008-12-31)
- Single Collection 2006-2008 A-Side Trax (2008-12-31)

=== Singles ===
- "Age Age Every Knight"|アゲ♂アゲ♂EVERY☆騎士|Age Age Eburi Naito| (2006)
- "Sunjon"/ "Junjyou-Sunjeong”|純情～スンジョン～"|| (2006)
- "One Night" (2006)
- "Shippū Jinrai (Inochi BOM-BA-YE)"|疾風迅雷～命BOM-BA-YE～"||(2007)
- "E.Yo.Ne!!" (2007)
- "Lie-Lie-Lie" (2007)
- "Spiderman" (2007)
- "Tokyo Boogie Back" (2007)
- "Ninkimono de Ikō!"|人気者で行こう(2008)
- "Masurao" (2008)
- "Chinkonka"|珍魂歌|(2011)
