= Hole in the Wall (video game) =

2011 video game

- Developer: Ludia
- Publisher: Microsoft Game Studios
- Platform: Xbox 360 (Xbox Live Arcade)
- Release: August 24, 2011
- Genre: Party (Trivia)
- Modes: Single-player, multiplayer

Hole in the Wall is a trivia party game based on the American game show that first aired on the Fox Broadcasting Company in 2008–2009 before getting picked up by Cartoon Network in 2010. It was developed by Ludia and published by Microsoft Game Studios for Xbox Live Arcade in 2011.

== Reception ==
Reception

Aggregate score
Aggregator	Score
Metacritic	47/100

Review scores
Publication	Score
4Players	40%
Electronic Gaming Monthly	2/10
Eurogamer	3/10
GamePro	3/5
GameSpot	5.5/10
GameZone	5/10
IGN	5/10
Official Xbox Magazine (US)	2/10
411Mania	7/10

The game received "generally unfavorable reviews" according to the review aggregation website Metacritic.

Since its release, the game sold 21,196 units worldwide by the end of 2011.
