= Takaaki Ishibashi =

Japanese comedian (born 1961)

- 石橋 貴明
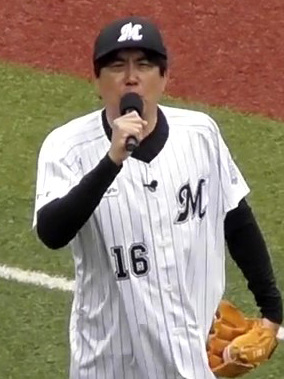
- Ishibashi in May 2021
- Born: October 22, 1961 (age 65); Katsushika, Tokyo, Japan
- Occupations: Comedian; actor; singer
- Years active: 1984–present
- Height: 1.82 m (6 ft 0 in)
- Spouses: Unknown (m. 1988; div. 1998); Honami Suzuki (m. 1998; div. 2021)
- Children: 4
- Website: Takaaki Ishibashi on Instagram; Takaaki Ishibashi on X Taka Channel on YouTube

Takaaki Ishibashi (石橋 貴明, Ishibashi Takaaki; born October 22, 1961) is a Japanese comedian, singer and actor. He is best known as a member of Tunnels and Yaen with his partner Noritake Kinashi.

== Early life ==
Born in Katsushika, Tokyo, Japan. When he was in the first grade of elementary school, his father's factory, Ishibashi Kasei, went bankrupt. Ishibashi and his family moved to a one room apartment without a bath in Narimasu, Itabashi. At that time Ishibashi experienced poverty. Later, their financial situation improved and Ishibashi went on to a private school, Teikyo High School. Ishibashi was a member of the baseball team in high school. He hit it off with a classmate, Noritake Kinashi, who was on the soccer team, and they became friends, later forming the comedy duo "Tunnels". After graduating from high school in 1980, he worked as a hotelier at the Century Hyatt Tokyo (currently Hyatt Regency Tokyo). However, he retired after four months. In 1982, Ishibashi and Kinashi won the grand prix at the "Owarai Star Tanjo!".

When Ishibashi told his parents that he wanted to retire from the hotel and become an entertainer, his mother cried. His father gave him a reprieve, saying, "Just work hard for four years as if you were in university." Ishibashi then worked very hard together with Noritake Kinashi. But before he turned 22, his father died. Four years had passed, and they had not yet sold out, but they were scheduled to appear on the variety show All Night Fuji. As a result, they got their break on this variety show All Night Fuji a little over four years later and became popular entertainers.

== Career ==
In the mid-1980s, Tunnels's appearances on the variety show All Night Fuji and the show Yuyake Nyan Nyan with the female idol Onyanko Club made them well known among young people, and a Dating game show Neruton Benikujiradan hosted by them that started in 1987, became a big hit, establishing their popularity. In 1988, the programs that bear their name began, and Tunnels reached the peak of its fame and popularity in 1990s.

In addition to working with Kinashi as Tunnels, Ishibashi was also active on an individual basis as a host, actor, and singer, as well as a solo artist. Ishibashi was a regular top-ranked actor and TV personality in the high taxpayer rankings, which were publicly available in Japan until 2005, and he and his partner Kinashi appeared at the top of the rankings. In the 20-year ranking of entertainers' lifetime earnings since 1980, he ranked second, following Tetsuya Komuro, who ranked first.

As an actor, Ishibashi is known for playing Isuro Tanaka in the film Major League II and Taka Tanaka in Major League: Back to the Minors. At the time of Hideo Nomo's move to Major League Baseball, many figures in Japanese professional baseball were openly skeptical of his chances of success. Takaaki Ishibashi, however, was among the few public figures who supported him. As Ishibashi later recalled, "People in the Japanese baseball community and the media were saying that there was no way Nomo could succeed in the major leagues," yet he continued to encourage Nomo throughout his challenge.

As a singer, Ishibashi has also his music career as a member of the Japanese vocal group Yazima Beauty Salon and member of Yaen. Yaen also participated in the 51st Kohaku Uta Gassen in 2000.

Tunnels is said to have reached his prime from the 1990s to the 2000s. Compared to the relatively calm Kinashi, Ishibashi is particularly violent, his unprecedented style of performing, such as breaking sets during singing performances. and Ishibashi became popular among young people for their "violent artistic style", acting like big shots and lashing out at guests.

On the music program Utaban, which Ishibashi and Masahiro Nakai were the hosts of, Ishibashi was known for making fun of the members of Morning Musume, a Japanese female idol group, on this program. It is said that he gave the group members strange nicknames, such as "Johnson", "Ka-san" (mom) or "Yasuda Daimyo-jin" (God Yasuda), which contributed to raise their profile. However, Ishibashi especially often teased one of the members, Kei Yasuda, by describing her appearance as a Kappa, a Japanese Yōkai (monster), and other such remarks about her appearance, which often made viewers displeasure, because Ishibashi seemed to be bullying her. Ishibashi said that producer Tsunku thanked him for raising the members' profile with this nickname, but Yasuda herself later said that it made it difficult for her to find a marriage partner.

In the autumn of 2016, it was reported that the Broadcasting Ethics and Program Improvement Organization (BPO) had deliberated on October 25 of the same year due to the large number of protests from viewers about the content of the broadcast of All Comedians Comedy Carnival 2016 Autumn on TBS TV, where Ishibashi served as the emcee. Complaints were made about a game in the program in which a comedian stripped naked and touched his crotch, saying that it was not a good idea to direct that if he stripped naked, it would be funny.

Ishibashi was also criticised in 2017 when he revived a 30-year-old character that played on homophobic stereotypes.

Eventually, Ishibashi's old artistic style came to be shunned by viewers, and his television appearances began to decline. In 2017, he was voted "No. 1 comedian to dislike" for the second consecutive year.

In June 2020, Ishibashi launched the YouTube channel Taka Channel, which surpassed 1 million subscribers in July.

In March 2021, Ishibashi's regular programming on television ended and it was reported that he no longer appeared regularly on terrestrial television. One of the reasons for the drastic decrease in his appearances was reportedly due in part to his high guarantees, and he commented that he would be working on YouTube for the future.

== Personal life ==
In 1988, Ishibashi married a civilian woman and had a daughter, but they divorced in October 1998. In November 1998, Ishibashi married actress Honami Suzuki (鈴木 保奈美). The couple later had three daughters. In July 2021, the couple announced they were divorcing. He has several nicknames such as "Taka-san" and "Taka-chan".

=== Health ===
On April 3, 2025, Ishibashi announced through his official YouTube channel that he has early-stage esophageal cancer and would need to be hospitalized and undergo surgery. He also announced that he would be taking a break from entertainment activities for the time being until he regains his strength.
