= Toita Women's College =

Coordinates: 35°38′3.8″N 139°44′58.8″E

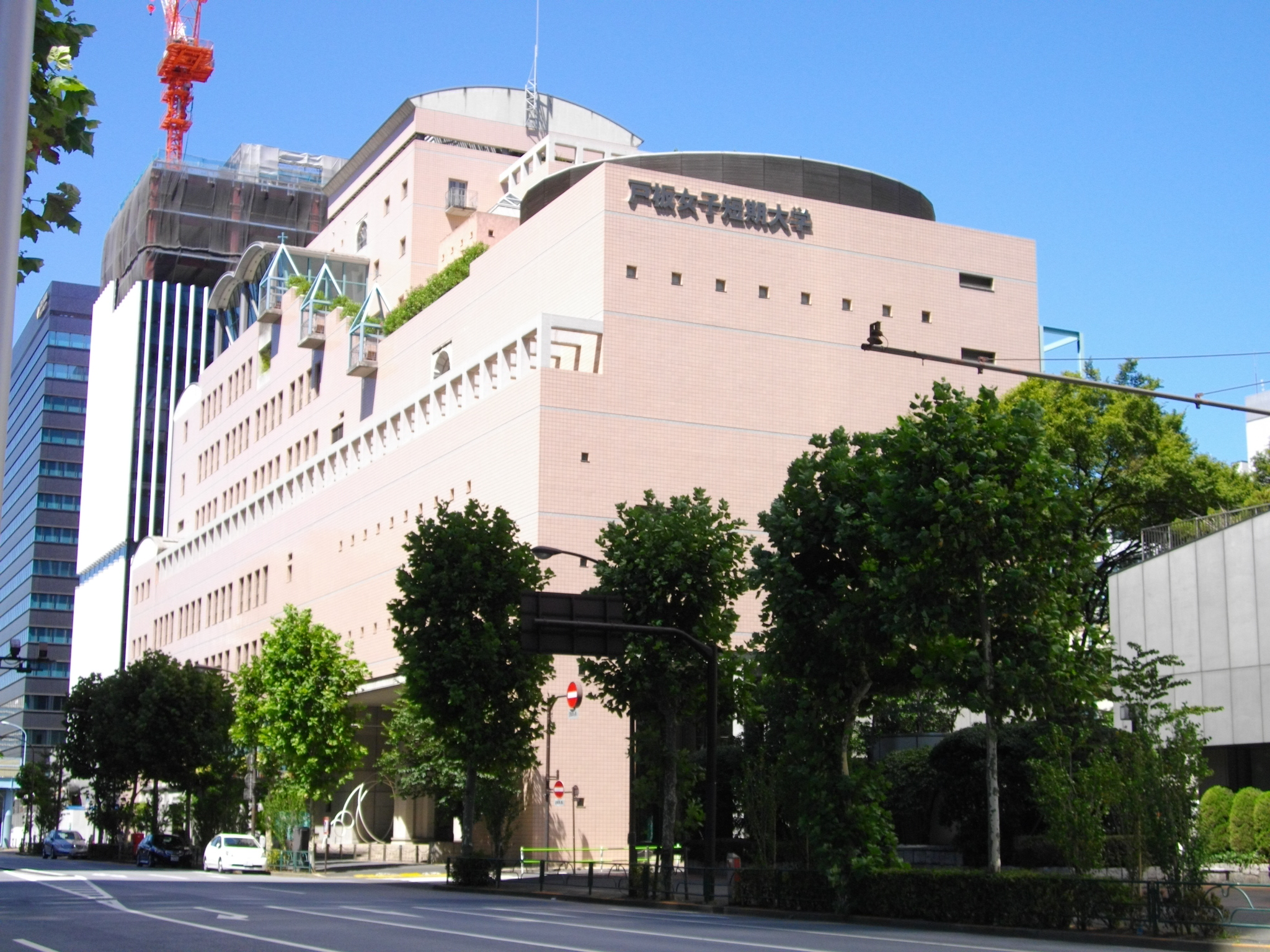
Toita Women's College

Toita Women's College (戸板女子短期大学, Toita joshi tanki daigaku) is a private women's junior college in Tokyo, Japan, established in 1950.
