= Noritake Kinashi =

Japanese comedian

- 木梨 憲武
- Born: 9 March 1962 (age 63); Chitosedai, Setagaya, Tokyo, Japan
- Other names: Nori-san (ノリさん); Nori-chan (ノリちゃん); Slennut no chaichī no hou (ずるねんとのちゃいちーの方, Zurunento no chaichī no hou)
- Education: Teikyo High School; Owarai Star Tanjō
- Occupations: Comedian; actor; singer; artist
- Years active: 1980–
- Agent: Arrival
- Style: Manzai; conte
- Television: Kinashi Mesen! Nori sun no Hawaii; Amai Kekkon; Kinashi Cycle; Mirai Sōzō-dō
- Height: 1.77 m (5 ft 10 in)
- Spouse: Narumi Yasuda (m. 1994)
- Partner: Takaaki Ishibashi
- Relatives: Morisho Kinashi (cousin)
- Website: KinashiNoritake_Com Noritake Kinashi

Noritake Kinashi (木梨 憲武, Kinashi Noritake; born 9 March 1962) is a Japanese comedian, actor, singer and artist. He is the short member of the comedy duo Tunnels, with whom he was a member of the pop group Yaen. His partner is Takaaki Ishibashi. He is the executive vice president of the entertainment office Arrival.

Kinashi's wife is actress Narumi Yasuda. His cousin is Liberal Democratic Party Suginami lawmaker Morisho Kinashi.

== Works ==
=== Creations ===
Kinashi had seven solo exhibitions by 2013. His style of painting is abstract based on the color red, sketching letters in landscapes, and still life drawings with simple color expression. While using his exhibitions via the interactive method of the Internet, he can also handle character designs in video games.

Year	Title	Type
1994	Taiyō Nikonika-ten	Exhibition
1996	Sendai The 77 Bank	Savings passbook
1996	Noritarou nō, e hon'nō, hagaki nō	Picture book
1997	Marvel Super Heroes vs. Street Fighter	Character design, voice (Norimaro)
1997	Tosanoumi Toshio	Apron
1998	Tokyo Metro	Poster
2000	Noritake Kinashi no Tenran-kai	Exhibition
2002	Score-ten	Exhibition
2003	Go With The Flow-ten	Exhibition
2003	Dai 114-kai Anda Pandan-ten	Exhibition
	Adagio Lounge classics	CD jacket
	Tsugutoshi Goto do not disturb	Album cover
	Kiichi Nakai Nikki	Book cover
2006	Shigeo Nagashima from Mizuno Corporation 3-Ban T-shirts	T-shirt design
2008	Noritake Kinashi: Iro no Sekai-ten in Kyoto	Exhibition
2008	Noritake Kinashi Echibition	Exhibition
2008	AFWP 2008 Japan Dai San-kai Sekai Heiwa Bijutsu Saiten	Exhibition
2009	Tokyo! Tokyo!! Tokyo!!! Ten	Exhibition
2010	Noritake Kinashi Spot Aoyama Tokyo 2010	Exhibition
2013	Noritake Kinashi Bijutsukan 2 Ai to Kibō to Hikari to Kapiolani Kōen to Watashi to Kyoto	Exhibition
2014	Noritake Kinashi-ten×20 years Inspiration: Shunkan no Kōkishin	Exhibition
2015	Noritake Kinashi Solo Exhibition	Exhibition

=== Discography ===
Year	Title
1996	Kenzaburō & George Yamamoto "Roman"
2002	Noritake Kinashi+Kiyoshiro Imawano "Ganbare Nippon"
2006	Ajisai "Futaridake no Sekai"

Delivery

Year	Title
2015	Fumiya Fujii & Noritake & Hiromi "Tomoyo"

=== Videos ===
Year	Title
2003	Ryōma no Tsuma to sono Otto to Aijin
2004	Noritake Guide Free Live
2005	Noritake Guide 2 Peace Live
2006	Noritake Guide 3 –99975 Party Live–
2007	Noritake Guide 4 One Half Live

== Filmography ==
(except guest appearance programmes)

=== Current appearances ===
Year	Title	Network	Notes	Ref.
2012	Kinashi Mesen! Nori sun no Hawaii	BS Fuji	Appeared three times annually	
2015	Yutaka-san to Noritake-chan! Tabi suru Aibō	TV Asahi		
2015	Noritake-Fumiya-Hiromi ga Iku! Camping Car Gasshuku: Deai-fureai shiawase tabi	Fuji TV		

=== Former appearances ===
==== TV programmes ====
Regular programmes

Year	Title	Network	Notes
2001	Kinashi Cycle	Fuji TV	
2002	Kinashi Guide Shūmatsu no Tatsujin	Fuji TV	
2005	Genseki	TBS	
2005	10 Karat	TBS	Appeared once a month
2006	Mirai Sōzō-dō	NTV	
2009	Ochanomizu Hakase	TBS	

=== Special programmes ===
Only for clarification (excluding guest appearance programmes)

Year	Title	Network
1993	Noritake Kinashi no Soccer da!	TV Asahi
1999	Nenmatsu Jumbo Nama Tokuban! Noritake-Hiromi to yu kaina Nakama ga TV de yaritakatta koto 50	TV Asahi
2000	Noritake Kinashi no Tenran-kai	Fuji TV
2000	Tokoro-Noritake-Hiromi no konna Bangumi Damedesuka?	TV Asahi
2002	Noritake Kinashi no Sekai no Soccer ga yattekimasu. Watashitachi no Kokorogamae	Fuji TV
2002	Jidan: W-hai Hideo Fensetsu "10" no Keifu	Fuji TV
2004	Oretachi no Zen Ei Open	TV Asahi
2005	Noritake Kinashi no Vs	TV Asahi
2011	BS Asahi Kaikyoku 10-shūnen Special Noritake Kinashi no Design ttena nda!? Gaudi no Ai shita machi Barcelona-hen	BS Asahi
2011	Iwai! Noritake Kinashi Seitan 50-shūnen hajimete no Kinashi	TV Asahi
2013	Noritake Kinashi New York MOMA no Nazo: Art ni naru Mono naranai Mono	BS Asahi
2015	Yutaka-san to Noritake-chan! Tabi suru Aibō	TV Asahi
2015	Kinashi no E wa Sekai e! 53-Sai Shinjin Gaka no NY Funtō-ki	Fuji TV
2016	Soccer W Hai Ajia Saishū Yosen Ōen Bangumi: Supporters	TV Asahi

=== TV dramas ===
Year	Title	Role	Network	Notes	Ref.
1997	3-Ban Table no Kyaku		Fuji TV	Also directed	
1998	Amai Kekkon	Kitaro Tadano	Fuji TV	Lead role	
1999	Restru Deka	Igarashi	TBS		
1999	Koichimin Kane	Ken Nabeshima	Fuji TV	Lead role	
2001	Natsuyasumi no Santa-san		NTV		
2004	Otōto	Night train conductor	TV Asahi	Episode 3	
2004	Ningendamono: Mitsuo Aida Monogatari	Mitsuo Aida	TV Asahi	Lead role	
2010	Wagaya no Rekishi	Ken'ichi Enomoto	Fuji TV		
2015	Yonimo Kimyōna Monogatari 25 Shūnenkinen! Aki no 2-shū Renzoku Special Kessaku Fukkatsu-hen: Omoide o Uru Otoko		Fuji TV		

=== Film ===
Year	Title	Role	Notes
2002	Ryōma no Tsuma to sono Otto to Aijin		
2004	University of Laughs		Hidden cast
2006	Memories of Tomorrow		Cameo
2008	Postman		Special guest
2015	Initiation Love		Cameo
2018	Inuyashiki	Ichiro Inuyashiki	Lead role

=== Animated films ===
Year	Title	Role	Notes
2003	Finding Nemo	Marlin	Japanese dub
2013	Walking with Dinosaurs	Patchi	Japanese dub
2016	Finding Dory	Marlin	Japanese dub

=== Stage ===
Year	Title
2004	Noritake Guide Free Live
2005	Noritake Guide II Peace Live
2012	Noritake Guide 5.0

== Bibliography ==
Year	Title	ISBN	Notes	Ref.
1997	Noritarou nō, e honnō, hagaki nō.	ISBN 4895883183		
1997	Noritarou nō, nuri e nō, hagaki nō.	ISBN 4895883191		
2016	Iru yo!!		Kiyomi Sawa did the shrimp animation	
2016	Dō shiyō...		Kiyomi Sawa did the shrimp animation	
2016	Mainichi.		Kiyomi Sawa did the shrimp animation	
