= Tunnels (comedy duo) =

Japanese comedy duo

The Tunnels (とんねるず, Tonneruzu) are an owarai duo with a long history composed of Tokyo-born Takaaki Ishibashi (石橋 貴明, Ishibashi Takaaki) and Noritake Kinashi (木梨 憲武, Kinashi Noritake). Both of them attended Teikyō High School (帝京高等学校) where Ishibashi, the taller of the two, participated in baseball, and Kinashi participated in soccer.

They originated not as a manzai duo, so much as an ippatsu gag and monomane act. During the early 1980s, they became immensely popular with young Japanese audiences, appearing in several television shows, but their popularity exploded with their show The Tunnels' Thanks to Everyone. Many times they absorbed more than 30% of nationwide television viewers, a great feat for any television show. They then turned their attention to creating music, spawning a string of hit singles that also generated massive sales and attention.

They created many words and expressions that resonated with the youth of Japan included such as moto-kare (元カレ) and moto-kano (元カノ), which are abbreviations meaning "ex-boyfriend" and "ex-girlfriend". Both phrases are still in popular use today. Also, their tendency to use inside jokes that only the show's staff would understand and laugh at created a sur-like response from the audience, inciting nervous laughter from a confused audience, while the staff laughed loudly on-mike.

Interest in the group quickly mellowed in 1990, as Tunnels took a half year vacation from the show, and Ucchan Nanchan replaced them. They returned later saying, "We are sorry to have laid the burden on Ucchan Nanchan," but were never really accepted back by the public. As groups such as Downtown and U-tchan Nan-chan became more popular with young audiences, Tunnels changed their focus to talk and interview-related shows.

Recently, they have teamed with DJ Ozma to "produce" the group Yazima Beauty Salon, who the three found in America. In reality, Ozma and the Tunnels are the members of Yazima Beauty Salon, cross-dressing and performing in character as Margaret Camelia Yazima (Kinashi) and Strawberry Camelia Yazima (Ishibashi).

== Filmography ==
=== Television shows ===
- Tonneruzu no Minasan no Okage deshita (1997–2018)
