= List of Japanese films of 1988 =

A list of films released in Japan in 1988 (see 1988 in film).

Title	Director	Cast	Genre	Notes
A Chaos of Flowers				
Akira	Katsuhiro Otomo		Science fiction	Animated film
Bakayaro! I'm Plenty Mad	Eriko Watanabe; Tetsuya Nakashima; Takahito Hara; Yukihiko Tsutsumi	Narumi Yasuda, Haruko Sagara		
The Discarnates	Nobuhiko Obayashi			Entered into the 16th Moscow International Film Festival
Dragon Ball: Mystical Adventure				
Guinea Pig: Android of Notre Dame			Horror	
Guinea Pig: Mermaid in a Manhole			Horror	Part of the Guinea Pig films series; Direct-to-video
Esper Mami: Hoshizora no Dancing Doll			Magical girl, family, drama	
Grave of the Fireflies	Isao Takahata		—N/a	Animated feature
Hare Tokidoki Buta	Toshio Hirata		family, comedy	
Hope and Pain	Yoji Yamada			Entered into the 39th Berlin International Film Festival
Kamen Rider Black: Hurry to Evil Island				
Kamen Rider Black: Fear! Evil Monster Mansion				
Mobile Suit Gundam: Char's Counterattack	Yoshiyuki Tomino	Toru Furuya	Science fiction	
My Neighbor Totoro	Hayao Miyazaki		—N/a	Animated feature
Rock yo shizukani nagareyo	Shunichi Nagasaki	Kenichi Okamoto, Shoji Narita, Kazuya Takahashi, koyo Maeda	Coming-of-age story	
Saint Seiya: The Heated Battle of the Gods				
Saint Seiya: Legend of Crimson Youth				
The Silk Road	Junya Sato	Toshiyuki Nishida, Koichi Sato, Anna Nakagawa	—N/a	
Sukeban Deka the Movie 2: Counter-Attack from the Kazama Sisters	Hideo Tanaka	Yui Asaka, Yuka Onishi, Yuma Nakamura		
Tatakae!! Ramenman the Movie				
A Taxing Woman's Return	Juzo Itami	Nobuko Miyamoto, Rentarō Mikuni, Toru Masuoka	—N/a	
Tokyo: The Last Megalopolis	Akio Jissoji			
Tora-san's Salad-Day Memorial	Yoji Yamada	Kiyoshi Atsumi	Comedy	40th in the Otoko wa Tsurai yo series
Umi e, See You	Koreyoshi Kurahara	Ken Takakura, Junko Sakurada, Nenji Kobayashi	Action, Drama	
Wuthering Heights	Yoshishige Yoshida			Entered into the 1988 Cannes Film Festival
Urusei Yatsura Movie 5 – The Final Chapter	Osamu Dezaki		—N/a	Animated feature
Yojo no jidai				

== See also ==
- 1988 in Japan
- 1988 in Japanese television
