= Sukeban Deka The Movie =

- Theatrical poster
- Directed by: Hideo Tanaka
- Written by: Izo Hashimoto; Tokio Tsuchiya
- Based on: Sukeban Deka by Shinji Wada
- Starring: Yoko Minamino; Shinobu Sakagami; Yui Asaka; Masato Ibu; Keizo Kanie
- Music by: Ichirô Nitta
- Production companies: Toei Company; Fuji Television
- Distributed by: Toei Company
- Release date: February 14, 1987 (Japan)
- Running time: 93 minutes
- Country: Japan
- Language: Japanese

Sukeban Deka The Movie (Japanese: スケバン刑事) is a live action Japanese film that was released in 1987. This is a sequel to the TV series Sukeban Deka II: Shōjo Tekkamen Densetsu, based on the manga series Sukeban Deka written and illustrated by Shinji Wada. It stars Yoko Minamino and Yui Asaka, who were also in the TV series. The movie was followed by Sukeban Deka II in 1988.

== Plot ==
After the events of the Sukeban Deka II TV series, the now 18-year-old Yoko Godai has abandoned her special agent Saki Asamiya name to return to her normal life and is studying for college entrance exams. However, she accidentally bumps into a young man named Kazuo Hagiwara escaping from a group of hitmen, and learns that he comes from Sankou Academy, a private school located in a remote island known as Hell's Castle. The school is ruled by the evil headmaster Hattori, a terrorist who is trying to brainwash students into his loyal agents. They are then attacked and captured in a bus driven by Sankou Academy henchmen, who proceed to submit Saki to electric torture, but they manage to escape.

Now knowing they are in danger, Saki enlists the help of her long time friend Kyoko "Marble Okyo" Nakamura, and all together they meet Megumi Kato, the sister of a friend of Kazuo, Kikuo, who failed to escape with him from Sankou. They are also joined by Yoko's own successor as Saki Asamiya, the plucky Yui Kazama from Sukeban Deka III, who has been sent by the Dark Inspector. However, before they can do a move, they are attacked by a helicopter sent by Hattori, and Kazuo dies shielding Saki before she can destroy it with her old yo-yo.

After reuniting with Yoko's other friend Yukino Yajima, the group plans a raid in Sankou Gakuen to take down Hattori. They are contacted by Yoko's former caretaker Nishiwaki, who reveals Hattori is actually a former revolutionary leader, Jishu Kita, thought to be dead after the Dark Inspector defeated him five years before. Hattori has returned now supported by a mysterious political fixer, the Mastermind, and is trying to stage a fascist coup d'etat in Japan. Nishiwaki also gives Yoko an improved version of her weapon, a quadruple weighted yo-yo with 16 times the power of her previous weapon but also the risk to inflict irreparable damage to her arm.

The team successfully infiltrates the island through its shore, but they are captured when Megumi turns out to be a traitor, betraying them in return for the chance to see her brother Kikuo again. The girls are introduced to Hattori, who is revealed to be a cyborg when he defeats Saki in a duel with his in-built weapons. However, Megumi changes sides again upon discovering that Kikuo has been lobotomized and helps them to escape. The team fights their way through Gakuan Academy and its elite juvenile fighters, and Megumi sacrifices her life to save Saki from a lethal dart thrown by Hattori, making up for her betrayal.

While the rest of her team prepares to blow up the island, Asamiya fights Hattori again, but this time the Sukeban Deka defeats him with her new yo-yo, almost crushing her own arm in the process, and kills him with electricity. The Sankou Academy is destroyed for good, freeing the students, and the Mastermind commits suicide to avoid being arrested by the Dark Inspector. At the end of the film, Yoko parts ways with Nishiwaki, who jokes this time it is really a goodbye, and walks away followed by Okyo and Yukino.

== Cast ==
- Yoko Minamino as Yōko Godai / Saki Asamiya II / Sukeban Deka II
- Yui Asaka as Yui Kazama / Saki Asamiya III / Sukeban Deka III
- Haruko Sagara as Kyōko Nakamura / "Okyō"
- Akie Yoshizawa as Yukino Yajima
- Ayako Kobayashi as Megumi Katō
- Masatō Ibu as Hattori
- Keizō Kanie as Nishiwaki
- Goro Kataoka as Kagenuma
- Shinobu Sakagami as Kazuo Hagiwara
- Katsumi Muramatsu as Mr. Kōsaka
- Tetta Sugimoto as Kikuo Katō
- Yayoi Tanaka as Yuri Shirai
- Hiroyuki Nagato as Dark Inspector
- Taketoshi Naito as the Mastermind
- Shinji Wada as the yo-yo seller (cameo)
- Yuka Onishi as Yuka Kazama (cameo)
- Yuma Nakamura as Yuma Kazama (cameo)
