= Akie Yoshizawa =

Japanese idol, singer, and actress

Akie Yoshizawa (吉沢 秋絵, Yoshizawa Akie, born October 20, 1968, in Tokyo, Japan) is a former Japanese idol, singer and actress in the 1980s. She made her debut in 1985, simultaneously selected as a member of Jpop female band Onyanko Club and as an actress in the TV series Sukeban Deka II as one of the three main parts. This led to appearances by her band in two episodes. She released a few solo discs before she retired, and married in 1996.

== Biography ==
She was born in Higashimurayama, a suburb of Tokyo, but subsequently moved to Sayama in Saitama Prefecture.

In August 1985, she auditioned for the variety show Yūyake Nyan Nyan("Sunset Meow Meow") (夕やけニャンニャン) on Fuji TV and was accepted. Unlike usually, the audition at this time also served as a recruitment for the regular cast of the TV drama Sukeban Deka II. Therefore, she was selected not only to be a member of Onyanko Club, but also to appear regularly in that drama as one of the two semi-lead actresses who support the lead actress, Yōko Minamino, along with Haruko Sagara. Moreover, the winner of this audition was also promised to sing the theme song for Sukeban Deka II. In November 1985, she became the second Onyanko Club member, after Sonoko Kawai, to make her solo debut with the song Naze? no Arashi (なぜ?の嵐). More strictly speaking, the song was released under the name Akie Yoshizawa with Onyanko Club. Whenever she sang this song on TV, she was supported by Onyanko Club members Aki Kihara, Mika Nagoya, Harumi Tomikawa (富川春美), and Ruriko Nagata (永田ルリ子).

In March 1986, she released a new theme song for the drama, Kisetsu Hazure no koi (季節はずれの恋), which ranked No. 1 on the Oricon chart in its first appearance. The B-side of the song was Membership Number Song (会員番号の唄), in which all the members of Onyanko Club introduced themselves. In June 1986, she released her first solo album, Her summer (彼女の夏, Kanojo no Natsu). In September 1986, she graduated from Onyanko Club along with popular members such as Eri Nitta and Satomi Fukunaga. In addition, a song titled Me in the Mirror (鏡の中の私, Kagami no naka no Watashi) was released as a single to commemorate her graduation. Nitta showed up only morning classes at Saitama Prefectural Fukuoka High School (埼玉県立福岡高校) she attended, while Yoshizawa properly stayed until her classes at Saitama Prefectural Sayama Seiryō High School (埼玉県立狭山青陵高校), which she attended, finished at 3:15 p.m. Therefore, she somehow managed to arrive 15 minutes before 5:00 p.m., when Yūyake Nyan Nyan was to be broadcast. In October 1986, her radio program called Just a little happening (ちょっとハプニング, Chotto Hapuningu) started on Nippon Broadcasting System. In November 1986, she starred in an idol drama called What's Michael (ホワッツマイケル), written by manga artist Makoto Kobayashi. In December 1986, she released her first song as a solo artist, Meteor marionette (流星のマリオネット, Ryūsei no Marionetto).

In April 1987, she enrolled at Akikusa Gakuen Junior College (秋草学園短期大学). In August 1987, Tōei premiered a movie called Meimon! Takonishi Ōendan (名門!多古西応援団), in which she played the heroine. She also released a song called Fireworks in the Rain (雨の花火, Ame no Hanabi), the theme song for the movie. Moreover, she hosted Pao Pao Channel (パオパオチャンネル) on TV Asahi, a variety show for children, along with TV personality Junji Takada (高田純次).

In 1991, she retired from the entertainment industry and became a writer for a fashion magazine. She then became an editor at a publishing house, Shufu to Seikatsusha (主婦と生活社). In 1993, she published a book titled I'm sorry, God!! (神様、ごめんなさい!!, Kamisama Gomennasai) In 1996, she married and lived abroad for a time before returning home.

== Discography ==
Singles

- Naze? no Arashi - 1985
- Kisetsuhazureno Koi - 1986
- Kagami no Naka no Watashi - 1986
- Ryuuseino Marionette - 1986
- Signal no Mukouni - 1987
- Ame no Hanabi - 1987
- Anata yori Sutekina Hito - 1990

Albums

- Kanojo no Natsu - 1986
- Aoi Tori o Sagashite - 1987
- Charming - 1987

Compilations

- Milky Mind - 1988
- Paris e Ikkitai - 1992
- Kanojo no Natsu + Single Collection

== Videos ==
- 硝子の少数意見 [Minority Opinion by Glass] (Videotape) (in Japanese). Tokyo, Japan: BMG JAPAN (BMG JAPAN). 1987-02-05. ASIN B00005L2W8.
