= List of Space Sheriff Gavan episodes =

This is the list of Space Sheriff Gavan episodes.

== Episodes ==
No.	Title	Directed by	Written by	Original release date
1	"Demon Fortress Under Tokyo"; Transliteration: "Tōkyō Chitei no Kai Yōsai" (Japanese: 東京地底の怪要塞)	Yoshiaki Kobayashi	Shōzō Uehara	March 5, 1982
2	"The Stolen Japanese Islands"; Transliteration: "Nusumareta Nihon Rettō" (Japanese: 盗まれた日本列島)	Yoshiaki Kobayashi	Shōzō Uehara	March 12, 1982
3	"Oh No! Stop Dr. Kuroboshi's BEM Project"; Transliteration: "Taihen da! Kuroboshi-Hakase no Bemu Keikaku o Soshi Seyo" (Japanese: 大変だ！黒星博士のベム計画を阻止せよ)	Yoshiaki Kobayashi	Shōzō Uehara	March 19, 1982
4	"The Demon Helmet That Calls For Death"; Transliteration: "Shi o Yobu Majin Kabuto" (Japanese: 死を呼ぶ魔人兜)	Atsuo Okunaka	Shōzō Uehara	March 26, 1982
5	"Mimi Cries, The Deadly Poison Cobra Bullet Hits Retsu"; Transliteration: "Mimī wa Naku Mōdoku Kobura Dan ga Retsu ni Meichū" (Japanese: ミミーは泣く 猛毒コブラ弾が烈に命中)	Atsuo Okunaka	Shōzō Uehara	April 9, 1982
6	"The Geniuses of the Makuu School"; Transliteration: "Makū Juku no Tensai-tachi" (Japanese: 魔空塾の天才たち)	Yoshiaki Kobayashi	Shōzō Uehara	April 16, 1982
7	"A Monster Hides, a Girl Kissed a Petal"; Transliteration: "Kaibutsu ga Hisomu Hanabira ni Shōjo wa Kuchidzuke Shita" (Japanese: 怪物がひそむ花びらに少女は口づけした)	Yoshiaki Kobayashi	Shōzō Uehara	April 30, 1982
8	"Good or Evil? The Silver-Masked Great Hero"; Transliteration: "Seigi ka Akuma ka? Gin Masuku Dai Hīrō" (Japanese: 正義か悪魔か？銀マスク大ヒーロー)	Atsuo Okunaka	Shōzō Uehara	May 7, 1982
9	"The Beautiful Puppet Spy"; Transliteration: "Utsukushii Ningyō Supai" (Japanese: 美しい人形スパイ)	Atsuo Okunaka	Shōzō Uehara	May 14, 1982
10	"Crush the Human Crusher Corps!"; Transliteration: "Ningen Kurasshā Butai o Gekiha Seyo!" (Japanese: 人間クラッシャー部隊を撃破せよ！)	Atsuo Okunaka	Shōzō Uehara	May 28, 1982
11	"Is Father Alive? The Mysterious SOS Signal"; Transliteration: "Chichi wa Ikite Iru no ka? Nazo no Esu Ō Esu Shingō" (Japanese: 父は生きているのか？謎のSOS信号)	Hideo Tanaka	Shōzō Uehara	June 4, 1982
12	"Go to the Amusement Park! UFO Boys' Big Pinch"; Transliteration: "Yūenchi e Kyūkō Seyo! Yūfō Shōnen Dai Pinchi" (Japanese: 遊園地へ急行せよ！UFO少年大ピンチ)	Hideo Tanaka	Shōzō Uehara	June 11, 1982
13	"Danger, Retsu! The Great Reversal"; Transliteration: "Ayaushi Retsu! Dai Gyakuten" (Japanese: 危うし烈！大逆転)	Atsuo Okunaka	Shōzō Uehara	June 18, 1982
14	"A Parting of Love And Sadness, The Final Blow!!"; Transliteration: "Ai to Kanashimi no Wakare Todome no Ichigeki!!" (Japanese: 愛と悲しみの別れ とどめの一撃!!)	Atsuo Okunaka	Shōzō Uehara	June 25, 1982
15	"Illusion? Shadow? Makuu City"; Transliteration: "Maboroshi? Kage? Makū Toshi" (Japanese: 幻？影？魔空都市)	Yoshiaki Kobayashi	Shōzō Uehara	July 2, 1982
16	"My First Love is a Jewel's Radiance. Goodbye, Galaxy Express"; Transliteration: "Hatsukoi wa Hōseki no Kagayaki Sayōnara Ginga Tokkyū" (Japanese: 初恋は宝石の輝き さようなら銀河特急)	Yoshiaki Kobayashi	Shōzō Uehara	July 9, 1982
17	"The Running Time Bomb! The Bad Guy Who Rode a Police Bike"; Transliteration: "Hashiru Jigen Bakudan! Shirobai ni Notta Ansatsusha" (Japanese: 走る時限爆弾！白バイに乗った暗殺者)	Yoshiaki Kobayashi	Susumu Takaku	July 16, 1982
18	"Princess Contest, Nonsense Dragon Palace"; Transliteration: "Otohimesama Kontesuto Hachamecha Ryūgūjō" (Japanese: 乙姫様コンテスト ハチャメチャ竜宮城)	Atsuo Okunaka	Shōzō Uehara	July 23, 1982
19	"Jochaku at 6:00 AM! Z Beam Charge Complete"; Transliteration: "Gozen Rokuji Jōchaku! Zetto Bīmu Chāji Kanryō" (Japanese: 午前6時蒸着！Zビームチャージ完了)	Atsuo Okunaka	Shōzō Uehara	July 30, 1982
20	"The Mysterious? Emergency Hospital! Humanity's Great Collapse Approaches"; Transliteration: "Nazo? No Kyūkyū Byōin! Jinrui no Dai Metsubō ga Semaru" (Japanese: なぞ？の救急病院！人類の大滅亡が迫る)	Hideo Tanaka	Mikio Matsushita	August 6, 1982
21	"The Dancing, Prickly Great Pinch: Operation Honey!"; Transliteration: "Odotte Chikuri Dai Pinchi Hanī Sakusen yo!" (Japanese: 踊ってチクリ大ピンチ ハニー作戦よ！)	Hideo Tanaka	Shōzō Uehara	August 20, 1982
22	"Golden Mask and Younger Sister: The Yacht Running Toward the Sun"; Transliteration: "Ōgon Kamen to Imōto Taiyō ni Mukatte Hashiru Yotto" (Japanese: 黄金仮面と妹 太陽に向って走るヨット)	Yoshiaki Kobayashi	Shōzō Uehara	September 3, 1982
23	"The Beauty's Cries That Cut Through the Night! The Phantom Coach in the Fog"; Transliteration: "Yami o Saku Bijo no Himei! Kiri no Naka no Yūrei Basha" (Japanese: 闇を裂く美女の悲鳴！霧の中の幽霊馬車)	Yoshiaki Kobayashi	Shōzō Uehara	September 10, 1982
24	"Mimi's Nightmare!? The Howling, Cut-Up Demonbeast"; Transliteration: "Mimī no Akumu ka!? Hoeru Kirisaki Majū" (Japanese: ミミーの悪夢か!?吠える切り裂き魔獣)	Hideo Tanaka	Shōzō Uehara	September 17, 1982
25	"The Suspiciously Flickering Underwater Flower. Wakaba in Danger"; Transliteration: "Ayashiku Yurameku Suichūka Wakaba ga Abunai" (Japanese: 怪しくゆらめく水中花 わかばが危ない)	Hideo Tanaka	Kazue Abe	October 1, 1982
26	"I Saw The Doll! The True Identity of the Poison Gas Killer Corps"; Transliteration: "Ningyō wa Mita!! Dokugasu Satsujin Butai no Shōtai" (Japanese: 人形は見た！！毒ガス殺人部隊の正体)	Yoshiaki Kobayashi	Shōzō Uehara	October 8, 1982
27	"The Teachers are Weird! A School Full of Weirdness"; Transliteration: "Sensei-tachi ga Hen da! Gakkō wa Kaiki ga Ippai" (Japanese: 先生たちが変だ！学校は怪奇がいっぱい)	Yoshiaki Kobayashi	Shōzō Uehara	October 15, 1982
28	"The Dark Sea of Space, Wandering Witch Monica"; Transliteration: "Ankoku no Uchū no Umi Samayoeru Majo Monika" (Japanese: 暗黒の宇宙の海 さまよえる魔女モニカ)	Hideo Tanaka	Susumu Takaku; Tatsuro Nagai	October 22, 1982
29	"Blitzkrieg Magic Battle! A Program of Assassination"; Transliteration: "Dengeki Majikku Kassen! Ansatsu no Puroguramu" (Japanese: 電撃マジック合戦！暗殺のプログラム)	Hideo Tanaka	Shōzō Uehara	October 29, 1982
30	"Don Horror's Son Has Returned to Makuu Castle"; Transliteration: "Don Horā no Musuko ga Makūjō ni Kaettekita" (Japanese: ドンホラーの息子が魔空城に帰って来た)	Yoshiaki Kobayashi	Shōzō Uehara	November 5, 1982
31	"Listening to the Angel's Song, the Princess Who Became a Doll"; Transliteration: "Tenshi no Uta ga Kikoeru Ningyō ni Sareta Ōjo" (Japanese: 天使の歌が聞こえる 人形にされた王女)	Yoshiaki Kobayashi	Shōzō Uehara	November 12, 1982
32	"The Mysterious Underground Maze Target is WX1"; Transliteration: "Nazo no Chitei Meiro Tāgetto wa Daburu Ekkusu Wan" (Japanese: 謎の地底迷路 ターゲットはWX-1)	Hideo Tanaka	Shōzō Uehara	November 19, 1982
33	"A New Monster is Born: The Boy Who Picked up an Alien"; Transliteration: "Shin Kaubutsu Tanjō Eirian o Hirotta Shōnen" (Japanese: 新怪物誕生 エイリアンを拾った少年)	Hideo Tanaka	Shōzō Uehara	November 26, 1982
34	"Memories are Tears of Stars: a Fatherless Child, a Motherless Child"; Transliteration: "Omoide wa Hoshi no Namida Chichi no Nai Ko Haha no Nai Ko" (Japanese: 思い出は星の涙 父のない子 母のない子)	Takeshi Ogasawara	Shōzō Uehara	December 3, 1982
35	"The Young Lion of Makuu. San Dorva's Opposition"; Transliteration: "Makū no Wakajishi San Doruba no Hankō" (Japanese: マクーの若獅子 サンドルバの反抗)	Takeshi Ogasawara	Shōzō Uehara	December 10, 1982
36	"The Roadshow of Resentment. The Film Studio is Makuu Space"; Transliteration: "Urami no Rōdoshō Satsueijo wa Makū Kūkan" (Japanese: 恨みのロードショー 撮影所は魔空空間)	Hideo Tanaka	Shōzō Uehara	December 17, 1982
37	"The Funny Tomboy Princess' Earth Adventure Trip"; Transliteration: "Otenba Hyōkin Hime no Chikyū Bōken Ryokō" (Japanese: おてんばひょうきん姫の地球冒険旅行)	Hideo Tanaka	Tomomi Tsutsui	December 24, 1982
38	"The Surrounded Transport Corps; the Righteous Sun Sword"; Transliteration: "Hōi Sareta Yusō Butai Seigi no Taiyō Tsurugi" (Japanese: 包囲された輸送部隊 正義の太陽剣)	Takafumi Hattori	Shōzō Uehara	January 14, 1983
39	"When I Returned From School, My House was a Makuu Base"; Transliteration: "Gakkō Kara Kaettara Boku no Uchi wa Makū Kichi" (Japanese: 学校から帰ったらぼくの家はマクー基地)	Takafumi Hattori	Shōzō Uehara	January 21, 1983
40	"The Decisive Battle of the Valley of Doom. You're a Space Sheriff Too!"; Transliteration: "Shi no Tani no Dai Kessen Kimi mo Uchū Keiji da!" (Japanese: 死の谷の大決戦 君も宇宙刑事だ！)	Takeshi Ogasawara	Tomomi Tsutsui	January 28, 1983
41	"Makuu City is a Battlefield of Men; The Red Hourglass of Life"; Transliteration: "Makū Toshi wa Otoko no Senjō Akai Seimei no Sunadokei" (Japanese: 魔空都市は男の戦場 赤い生命の砂時計)	Takeshi Ogasawara	Tsuyo Hayashi	February 4, 1983
42	"Retsu! Hurry! Dad!"; Transliteration: "Retsu yo Isoge! Chichi yo" (Japanese: 烈よ急げ！父よ)	Hideo Tanaka	Shōzō Uehara	February 11, 1983
43	"Reunion"; Transliteration: "Saikai" (Japanese: 再会)	Hideo Tanaka	Shōzō Uehara	February 18, 1983
44	"The Head of Don Horror"; Transliteration: "Don Horā no Kubi" (Japanese: ドンホラーの首)	Hideo Tanaka	Shōzō Uehara	February 25, 1983

== See also ==
- Space Sheriff Gavan: The Movie
