= Shamo (manga) =

Japanese manga series by Izo Hashimoto and Akio Tanaka

- First volume cover, featuring Ryo Narushima

軍鶏
- Genre: Crime; Martial arts; Thriller
- Manga
- Written by: Akio Tanaka; Izo Hashimoto (vol. 1–25) (Note: Hashimoto was credited as writer until the 25th volume (as seen on the original covers); from the 26th volume onwards, Tanaka is credited as the sole author, and later reissues of volumes 20–25 no longer credit Hashimoto.)
- Illustrated by: Akio Tanaka
- Published by: Futabasha (1998–2003); Kodansha (2004–2015)
- Magazine: Weekly Manga Action (1998–2003); Evening (2004–2015)
- Original run: July 1998 – January 2015
- Volumes: 34
- Live-action film
- Shamo (2007)
- icon

Shamo (Japanese: 軍鶏; lit. 'Gamecock') is a Japanese manga series written by Akio Tanaka and Izo Hashimoto and illustrated by Tanaka. It was first serialized in Futabasha's seinen manga magazine Weekly Manga Action from 1998 to 2003, before transferring to Kodansha's seinen manga magazine Evening in 2004. It was discontinued in 2007 due to creative differences but returned in 2011, concluding serialization in 2015. It tells a story of a boy who killed his parents and turned himself into a cold-blooded martial artist. The manga inspired a Hong Kong film adaptation released in 2007.

== Plot ==
Ryo Narushima (成嶋 亮, Narushima Ryō), a gifted high school student on track to attend the Tokyo University, murders his parents in a sudden act of violence. Convicted at 16, he is sent to a reformatory where he endures brutal assaults until Kenji Kurokawa (黒川健児, Kurokawa Kenji), a former revolutionary imprisoned for an attempted assassination of the Prime Minister, teaches him karate. Ryo survives, hones his skills, and is released after two years—but not before viciously retaliating against his tormentors.

Now free, Ryo drifts through Tokyo's criminal underworld, working as a gigolo and ambushing gangsters to refine his fighting abilities. He enters the Banryukai karate tournament, using psychological warfare and blackmail to secure victory. Despite backlash over his ruthless tactics, Banryukai leader Kensuke Mochizuki (望月 謙介, Mochizuki Kensuke) validates his win, acknowledging Ryo's skill.

Ryo's next challenge is Naoto Sugawara (菅原 直人, Sugawara Naoto), a top Banryukai (番竜会, Banryūkai) fighter. To provoke him, Ryo rapes Sugawara's girlfriend, forcing a televised showdown at the Tokyo Dome. After grueling steroid-enhanced training, Ryo—despite being outmatched—unleashes a hidden left-handed assault, nearly defeating Sugawara before collapsing. Their feud culminates in a brutal rematch at an abandoned temple, where Ryo leaves Sugawara hospitalized with a critical neck injury.

Later, Ryo attracts the attention of Toma Takahara (高原 東馬, Takahara Tōma), a former ballet dancer obsessed with "saving" him. After Ryo's physical decline from steroid abuse, he competes in a grappling tournament organized by Mochizuki, facing Toma's team. Though weakened by a stab wound mid-event, Ryo psychologically dismantles Toma before passing out from blood loss. The aftermath sees Mochizuki ousted and the Banryukai fractured, while Kurokawa dies mysteriously.

In the final story arc, Ryo begins a relationship with a woman whose father hires assassins to kill him. After defeating one attacker, Ryo succumbs to his injuries in a forest, his fate ambiguously symbolized by tattered remnants of his crow-patterned shirt.

== Media ==
=== Manga ===
Originally authored by Izo Hashimoto (writer) and Akio Tanaka (illustrator), Shamo started in Futabasha's seinen manga magazine Weekly Manga Action in July 1998. After Manga Action ceased publication (though it later resumed), the series moved to Kodansha's seinen manga magazine Evening in 2004. The series was put on hold in 2007 due in part to creative differences. In June 2008, Tanaka sued Hashimoto for ¥150 million (about US$1.4 million) in a Tokyo District Court copyright dispute. Tanaka claimed he was the true creator of the story and characters and not Hashimoto. The series resumed in Evening on July 26, 2011. It finished on January 13, 2015. Futabasha released 19 tankōbon volumes from October 12, 1998, to June 19, 2003. Kodansha published Volumes 21–34 from June 23, 2005, to February 23, 2015, and collected the first 19 volumes into seven new-edition volumes, released from June 23 to September 23, 2011.

==== Volumes ====
No.	Japanese release date	Japanese ISBN
1	October 12, 1998	978-4-575-82383-7
2	December 5, 1998	978-4-575-82394-3
3	March 12, 1999	978-4-575-82416-2
4	June 9, 1999	978-4-575-82432-2
5	February 28, 2000	978-4-575-82452-0
6	March 28, 2000	978-4-575-82488-9
7	April 22, 2000	978-4-575-82492-6
8	May 27, 2000	978-4-575-82499-5
9	August 8, 2000	978-4-575-82509-1
10	November 11, 2000	978-4-575-82525-1
11	February 26, 2001	978-4-575-82551-0
12	May 28, 2001	978-4-575-82572-5
13	September 28, 2001	978-4-575-82607-4
14	November 19, 2001	978-4-575-82627-2
15	March 18, 2002	978-4-575-82663-0
16	July 18, 2002	978-4-575-82709-5
17	November 12, 2002	978-4-575-82760-6
18	March 19, 2003	978-4-575-82816-0
19	June 19, 2003	978-4-575-82845-0
20	June 23, 2005	978-4-06-352113-9
21	June 23, 2005	978-4-06-352114-6
22	October 21, 2005	978-4-06-352128-3
23	March 23, 2006	978-4-06-352140-5
24	August 23, 2006	978-4-06-352159-7
25	November 22, 2006	978-4-06-352169-6
26	October 21, 2011	978-4-06-352381-2
27	March 23, 2012	978-4-06-352402-4
28	August 23, 2012	978-4-06-352429-1
29	February 22, 2013	978-4-06-352447-5
30	June 21, 2013	978-4-06-352463-5
31	December 20, 2013	978-4-06-352491-8
32	May 23, 2014	978-4-06-354512-8
33	September 22, 2014	978-4-06-354537-1
34	February 23, 2015	978-4-06-354558-6

=== Live-action film ===
A live-action film adaptation was released in 2007. It was directed by Cheang Pou-soi and starred Shawn Yue.
