= List of Space Sheriff Shaider episodes =

This is the list of Space Sheriff Shaider episodes.

== Episodes ==
No.	Title	Directed by	Original release date
1	"The Fushigi World"; Transliteration: "Fushigikai" (Japanese: 不思議界)	Shinichiro Sawai	March 2, 1984
2	"Dance, Petpet"; Transliteration: "Odore, Petopeto!" (Japanese: 踊れペトペト!)	Shinichiro Sawai	March 9, 1984
3	"Annie Doesn't Listen"; Transliteration: "Anī Ōtōnashi" (Japanese: アニー応答なし)	Hideo Tanaka	March 16, 1984
4	"The Children Who Became Dogs"; Transliteration: "Inu ni Natta Kodomotachi" (Japanese: 犬になった子供達)	Hideo Tanaka	March 23, 1984
5	"Suddenly! Lazy People"; Transliteration: "Totsuzen! Namakemono" (Japanese: 突然! なまけもの)	Hideo Tanaka	March 30, 1984
6	"Strange Cooking Counterattack"; Transliteration: "Fushigi Ryouri no Gyakushuu" (Japanese: 不思議料理の逆襲)	Michio Konishi	April 13, 1984
7	"Have You Seen the Girls' Hallucination?"; Transliteration: "Mitaka Gyaru Hengen" (Japanese: 見たかギャル変幻)	Michio Konishi	April 20, 1984
8	"Rebellious Girl From the Stars"; Transliteration: "Hoshi kara no Hikō Shōjo" (Japanese: 星からの非行少女)	Hideo Tanaka	April 27, 1984
9	"I Hate the Blue Boys Band!"; Transliteration: "Aogaki Tai Daikirai" (Japanese: 青ガキ隊大キライ)	Hideo Tanaka	May 4, 1984
10	"House of Twilight"; Transliteration: "Towairaito no Ie" (Japanese: トワイライトの家)	Makoto Tsuji	May 11, 1984
11	"Leave It to Annie"; Transliteration: "Anī ni Omakase" (Japanese: アニーにおまかせ)	Makoto Tsuji	May 18, 1984
12	"Perfect-Score Genta's True Identity?"; Transliteration: "Hyakuten Genta no Shōtai?" (Japanese: 百点源太の正体?)	Hideo Tanaka	May 25, 1984
13	"The Gold Medal Tricked People"; Transliteration: "Kin Medaru Shikakenin" (Japanese: 金メダル仕掛け人)	Hideo Tanaka	June 1, 1984
14	"The Love Mutant"; Transliteration: "Koi no Myūtanto" (Japanese: 恋のミュータント)	Yoshiaki Kobayashi	June 8, 1984
15	"Marine Blue of the Seashore"; Transliteration: "Nagisa no Marin Burū" (Japanese: 渚のマリンブルー)	Yoshiaki Kobayashi	June 15, 1984
16	"The Surprised Alien Life Form"; Transliteration: "Tamageta Isei Seibutsu" (Japanese: たまげた異星生物)	Hideo Tanaka	June 22, 1984
17	"The Mysterious Writings of the Space Sheriffs"; Transliteration: "Ginga Keisatsu no Nazomoji" (Japanese: 銀河警察の謎文字)	Hideo Tanaka	June 29, 1984
18	"The Fallen Empire Swallowed by the Pacific Ocean"; Transliteration: "Nazoga Nazoyobu Taiheiyō" (Japanese: 謎が謎呼ぶ太平洋)	Takeshi Ogasawara	July 6, 1984
19	"Annie In Danger"; Transliteration: "Anī Kiki Ippatsu" (Japanese: アニー危機一髪)	Takeshi Ogasawara	July 13, 1984
20	"The Fushigi Song"; Transliteration: "Fushigi Songu" (Japanese: 不思議ソング)	Makoto Tsuji	July 20, 1984
21	"Oh No! The Beast Family"; Transliteration: "Yāda! Chinjū Kazoku" (Japanese: ヤーダ! 珍獣家族)	Makoto Tsuji	July 27, 1984
22	"The Merman Calls the Ocean of Mysteries"; Transliteration: "Ningyo ga Yobu Umi no Kai" (Japanese: 人魚が呼ぶ海の怪)	Takeshi Ogasawara	August 3, 1984
23	"The Great Escape With Wounds All Over"; Transliteration: "Kizudarake no Dai Dassō" (Japanese: 傷だらけの大脱走)	Takeshi Ogasawara	August 24, 1984
24	"The Beautiful Poe's Mask"; Transliteration: "Utsukushiki Pō no Kamen" (Japanese: 美しきポーの仮面)	Yoshiaki Kobayashi	August 31, 1984
25	"Esper Queen"; Transliteration: "Esupā Kuīn" (Japanese: エスパークイーン)	Yoshiaki Kobayashi	September 7, 1984
26	"Great Crash Into the Demon Zone"; Transliteration: "Makai Zōn Ōatari" (Japanese: 魔界ゾーン大当り)	Michio Konishi	September 21, 1984
27	"The Demon Island Deathmatch"; Transliteration: "Desumatchi no Matō" (Japanese: デスマッチの魔島)	Michio Konishi	September 28, 1984
28	"The Demon Palace's Backstabbing Brothers"; Transliteration: "Makyū no Uragiri Kyodai" (Japanese: 魔宮の裏切り兄弟)	Hideo Tanaka	October 5, 1984
29	"Police Woman with a Hundred Faces"; Transliteration: "Hyakumensō da yo Onna Keiji" (Japanese: 百面相だよ女刑)	Hideo Tanaka	October 12, 1984
30	"The Message of Life Slicing the Sky"; Transliteration: "Kū wo Saku Inochi no Kōshin" (Japanese: 空を裂く命の交信)	Takeshi Ogasawara	October 19, 1984
31	"Canned Beast Bargain"; Transliteration: "Mōjū Kanzume Bāgen" (Japanese: 猛獣缶詰バーゲン)	Takeshi Ogasawara	October 26, 1984
32	"Our Melody"; Transliteration: "Boku to Kimi no Merodi" (Japanese: 僕と君のメロディ)	Yoshiaki Kobayashi	November 2, 1984
33	"The Walking Puppet Master"; Transliteration: "Sanpo-suru Hukuwajutsushi" (Japanese: 散歩する腹話術師)	Yoshiaki Kobayashi	November 9, 1984
34	"Kubilai's Secret"; Transliteration: "Kubirai no Himitsu" (Japanese: クビライの秘密)	Hideo Tanaka	November 16, 1984
35	"The Mysterious Golden Arrow"; Transliteration: "Nazo wo Iru Ōgon no Ya" (Japanese: 謎を射る黄金の矢)	Hideo Tanaka	November 23, 1984
36	"It's the Maddening Age of Yumecom"; Transliteration: "Yumekon Kyō Jidai da" (Japanese: ユメコン狂時代だ)	Takeshi Ogasawara	November 30, 1984
37	"Roaring Beam Gun"; Transliteration: "Hoero Bīmu Gan" (Japanese: 吼えろビームガン)	Takeshi Ogasawara	December 7, 1984
38	"Demon Girl Cinderella"; Transliteration: "Mashōjo Shinderera" (Japanese: 魔少女シンデレラ)	Shinichiro Sawai	December 14, 1984
39	"The Masked Dancing Choir"; Transliteration: "Kamen ga Odoru Seikatai" (Japanese: 仮面が踊る聖歌隊)	Shinichiro Sawai	December 21, 1984
40	"Vavilos S.O.S."; Transliteration: "Babirosu-gou Esu Ō Esu" (Japanese: バビロス号SOS)	Michio Konishi	December 28, 1984
41	"Direct Attack on the Female Journalist"; Transliteration: "Chokugeki Jajauma Musume" (Japanese: 直撃じゃじゃ馬娘)	Michio Konishi	January 11, 1985
42	"The 6th Grade Class 0 Strangeness"; Transliteration: "Rokunen Zero-Gumi no Fushigi" (Japanese: 6年0組の不思議)	Minoru Yamada	January 18, 1985
43	"Our Fuuma"; Transliteration: "Bokunchi No Fūma" (Japanese: ぼくンちのフーマ)	Minoru Yamada	January 25, 1985
44	"The Great Invasion"; Transliteration: "Fuki Areru Daishinryaku" (Japanese: 吹き荒れる大侵略)	Michio Konishi	February 1, 1985
45	"The Fire Breathing Golden Idol"; Transliteration: "Hi o Haku Ōgon Kyozō" (Japanese: 火を吐く黄金巨像)	Michio Konishi	February 8, 1985
46	"Phantom Showtime"; Transliteration: "Maboroshi no Shōtaimu" (Japanese: 幻のショータイム)	Michio Konishi	February 15, 1985
47	"Twelve Thousand Years of Darkness"; Transliteration: "Ichiman Nisennen no Ankoku" (Japanese: 一万二千年の暗黒)	Takeshi Ogasawara	February 22, 1985
48	"Justice – Friendship – Love"; Transliteration: "Seigi – Yūjō – Ai." (Japanese: 正義・友情・愛)	Takeshi Ogasawara	March 1, 1985
49	"The Three Space Sheriffs – Gavan, Sharivan, Shaider Great Gathering!"; Transliteration: "Sannin no Uchū Keiji: Gyaban, Shariban, Shaidā Daishūgō!" (Japanese: 3人の宇宙刑事 ギャバン シャリバン シャイダー大集合!)	Takeshi Ogasawara	March 8, 1985

== See also ==
- The Space Sheriff Spirits
