= 1988 in Japanese television =

Events in 1988 in Japanese television.

== Debuts ==
Show	Station	Premiere Date	Genre	Original Run
Choujuu Sentai Liveman	TV Asahi	February 27	tokusatsu	February 27, 1988 – February 18, 1989
City Hunter 2	Yomiuri TV	April 2	anime	April 2, 1988 – July 14, 1989
Dennou Keisatsu Cybercop	Nippon TV	October 2	tokusatsu	October 2, 1988 - July 5, 1989
Don Don Domel and Ron	TV Tokyo	April 5	anime	April 5, 1988 – March 27, 1989
Kamen Rider Black RX	MBS	October 23	tokusatsu	October 23, 1988 – September 24, 1989
Kiteretsu Daihyakka	Fuji TV	March 27	anime	March 27, 1988 - June 9, 1996
Legendary Armor Samurai Troopers	TV Asahi	April 30	anime	April 30, 1988 – March 4, 1989
Mashin Hero Wataru	Nippon TV	April 15	anime	April 15, 1988 – March 31, 1989
Sekai Ninja Sen Jiraiya	TV Asahi	January 24	tokusatsu	January 24, 1988 – January 22, 1989
Soreike! Anpanman	Nippon TV	October 3	anime	October 3, 1988 - present
Transformers: Super-God Masterforce	Nippon TV	April 12	anime	April 12, 1988 – March 7, 1989

== Ongoing shows ==
- Music Fair, music (1964–present)
- Mito Kōmon, jidaigeki (1969-2011)
- Sazae-san, anime (1969–present)
- Ōoka Echizen, jidaigeki (1970-1999)
- FNS Music Festival, music (1974-present)
- Panel Quiz Attack 25, game show (1975–present)
- Doraemon, anime (1979-2005)
- Dragon Ball, anime (1986–1989)
- Saint Seiya, anime (1986–1989)
- Esper Mami, anime (1987-1989)

== Endings ==
Show	Station	Ending Date	Genre	Original Run
Masked Ninja: Akakage	Nippon TV	March 22	anime	October 13, 1987 – March 22, 1988
Choujinki Metalder	TV Asahi	January 17	tokusatsu	March 16, 1987 – January 17, 1988
City Hunter	Yomiuri TV	March 28	anime	April 6, 1987 – March 28, 1988
Fist of the North Star 2	Fuji TV	February 18	anime	March 13, 1987 – February 18, 1988
Hikari Sentai Maskman	TV Asahi	February 20	tokusatsu	February 28, 1987 – February 20, 1988
Kamen Rider Black	MBS	October 9	tokusatsu	October 4, 1987 – October 9, 1988
Maison Ikkoku	Fuji TV	March 2	anime	March 26, 1986 – March 2, 1988
Oraa Guzura Dado 2	TV Tokyo	September 20	anime	October 12, 1987 – September 20, 1988
Transformers: The Headmasters	Nippon TV	March 25	anime	July 3, 1987 – March 25, 1988

== See also ==
- 1988 in anime
- List of Japanese television dramas
- 1988 in Japan
- List of Japanese films of 1988
