= Shamo (film) =

2007 Hong Kong film by Soi Cheang

- Film poster
- Traditional Chinese: 軍雞
- Simplified Chinese: 军鸡
- Hanyu Pinyin: Jūnjī
- Jyutping: Gwan1 Gai1
- Directed by: Soi Cheang
- Written by: Szeto Kam-Yuen; Izo Hashimoto
- Based on: Shamo by Izo Hashimoto and Aikio Tanaka
- Produced by: Sam Leong; Shin Yoneyama; Izo Hashimoto; Toji Kato; Hirofumi Ogoshi
- Starring: Shawn Yue; Annie Liu; Francis Ng; Masato; Bruce Leung
- Cinematography: Edmund Fung
- Edited by: Kong Chi-leung
- Music by: Patrick Lo
- Production companies: Same Way Production; Art Port; Pony Canyon
- Distributed by: Gala Film Distribution
- Release dates: 3 December 2007 (Taipei Golden Horse Film Festival); 6 March 2008
- Running time: 105 minutes
- Country: Hong Kong
- Language: Cantonese

Shamo is a 2007 Hong Kong martial arts film directed by Soi Cheang, based on the Japanese manga series Shamo by Akio Tanaka and Izo Hashimoto. The film stars Shawn Yue as a student who murders his parents, and, while in prison, is trained to become a violent, professional fighter by a fellow inmate played by Francis Ng.

== Cast ==
- Shawn Yue as Ryo Narushima
- Annie Liu as Megumi
- Francis Ng as Kenji Kurokawa
- Masato as Naoto Sugawara
- Ryo Ishibashi as Principal Saeki
- Dylan Kuo as Ryuichi Yamazaki
- Bruce Leung as Kensuke Mochizuki
- Pei Pei as Natsumi Narushima
- Zing Chau as Kouhei Fujiyoshi

== Accolades ==
Accolades
Ceremony	Category	Recipient	Outcome
44th Golden Horse Awards	Best Adapted Screenplay	Szeto Kam-Yuen, Izo Hashimoto	Nominated
44th Golden Horse Awards	Best Action Choreography	Jack Wong	Nominated
44th Golden Horse Awards	Best Cinematography	Edmund Fung	Nominated

== See also ==
- List of boxing films
