= Nagare Hagiwara =

Actor and TV Personality

- 萩原 流行
- Born: Mitsuo Hagiwara (萩原 光男); 8 April 1953; Tokyo
- Died: 22 April 2015 (aged 62); Suginami, Tokyo
- Occupations: Actor, TV personality
- Years active: 1982–2015
- Spouse: Mayumi Hagiwara

Mitsuo Hagiwara (萩原 光男, Hagiwara Mitsuo; 8 April 1953 – 22 April 2015), better known by his stage name Nagare Hagiwara (萩原 流行, Hagiwara Nagare), was a Japanese actor and TV personality.

== Death ==
On 22 April 2015, two weeks after his 62nd birthday, Hagiwara died in a road accident in Suginami, Tokyo, while riding his motorbike.

== Filmography ==
=== Cinema ===
- Fall Guy (1982) - Yuji
- Theater of Life (1983) - Actor portraying Kira no Nikichi
- Legend of the Eight Samurai (1983) - Yōnosuke
- Usugeshô (1985) - Tateishi
- Kizudarake no kunshô (1986) - Kataoka
- Jittemai (1986)
- Sukeban Deka the Movie 2: Counter-Attack from the Kazama Sisters (1988) - Yoda
- Onimaru (1988) - Hidemaru
- Asobi no jikan wa owaranai (1991) - Local TV Producer
- Kantsubaki (1992) - Tamura
- Kowagaru hitobito (1994) - Station employee A
- Ai no shinsekai (1994) - Sawanobori
- Mâkusu no yama (1995)
- Gokudo no onna-tachi: Akai kizuna (1995) - Shuzo Goto
- Joker (1998) - Ara
- Gunro no keifu (1999) - Shinjo
- Sagishi ippei (1999) - Ippei
- Sagishi ippei 2 (2000) - Ippei
- Sagishi ippei 3 (2000) - Ippei
- Gin no otoko 2 (2001)
- Hoshi ni negai wo (2003)
- Waru (2006)
- Kuishimbô! ohgui kaigan hen (2007) - Hunter george
- Famîyu: Furansupan to watashi (2008)
- Hitomi o tojite (2013) - Jin

=== TV drama ===
- Sukeban Deka III (1986–1987, TV Movie)
- Garo Gold Storm Sho (2015) (Principal)
