= Izo Hashimoto =

Japanese screenwriter and film director (1954–2026)

- Born: February 21, 1954; Shimane Prefecture, Japan
- Died: May 12, 2026 (aged 72); Kumamoto Prefecture, Japan
- Occupations: Film director, screenwriter

Izo Hashimoto (橋本 以蔵, Hashimoto Izō; February 21, 1954 – May 12, 2026) was a Japanese screenwriter and film director.

== Biography ==
In 1984, Hashimoto made his directorial debut with the independent film Pasokon Wars Isami, after which he began writing for television with the hit drama series Sukeban Deka.

He co-wrote the screenplays for Katsuhiro Otomo's Akira and Shinji Aoyama's EM Embalming.

Hashimoto died of rectal cancer on May 12, 2026 at the age of 72.

== Filmography ==
=== As director ===
- Pasokon Wars Isami (1984)
- Meimon Takonishi Oendan (1987)
- CF Girl (1989)
- Lucky Sky Diamond (1990)
- Evil Dead Trap 2 (1992)
- Driving High (1993)
- Puru-puru: Tenshi Teki Kyujitsu (1993)
- Teito Monogatari Gaiden (1995)
- Kagerō 2 (1996)

=== As screenwriter ===
- Barrow Gang BC (1985)
- Sukeban Deka (1985-1987)
- Sukeban Deka The Movie (1987)
- The Drifting Classroom (1987)
- To-y (1987)
- Sukeban Deka the Movie 2: Counter-Attack from the Kazama Sisters (1988)
- Akira (1988)
- Spirit Warrior (1988)
- CF Girl (1989)
- Aoki Densetsu Shoot! (1994)
- Kagerō 2 (1996)
- Black Jack (1996)
- Kenka Ramen (1996)
- Onna Horishi Azami (1998)
- EM Embalming (1999)
- Rinjin wa Hisoka ni Warau (1999)
- The Guys from Paradise (2001)
- Ah! Ikkenya Puroresu (2004)
- Jitensha Shounenki (2006)
- Shamo (2007)
