= Yoko Minamino =

Japanese actress and singer (born 1967)

- 南野 陽子
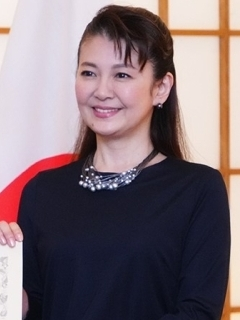
- Minamino in 2023
- Born: June 23, 1967 (age 59); Itami, Hyōgo, Japan
- Other name: Nanno (Idol nickname)
- Education: Horikoshi High School
- Occupations: Actress; singer
- Years active: 1984–present
- Spouse: Unknown (m. 2011; div. 2023)
- Musical career
- Genres: J-pop; Kayōkyoku
- Instrument: Vocals
- Labels: Sony Music Japan (1995); Sony Japan (from 1989)

Yoko Minamino (Japanese: 南野 陽子, Hepburn: Minamino Yōko; born June 23, 1967), also known as Nanno (ナンノ), is a Japanese actress and singer. She is best known for playing Saki Asamiya in the second season of the live action Sukeban Deka television series. Though currently independent, Minamino was previously under the S1 Company, Southern Field, Sweet Basil and K Dash Group talent agencies.

== Early life and education ==
Minamino was scouted during high school when she went to see a public recording. Moving from Hyōgo to Tokyo when she was seventeen, Minamino attended Horikoshi High School with Minako Honda and Yukiko Okada, graduating in 1986.

== Career ==
Minamino made her debut television role in 1984 in Meimon Shiritsu Jōshi Kōkō. She began working for the talent agency S1 Company at this time. Despite being a mostly unknown face in Japanese entertainment, Minamino was given an unusually large number of photos in a seinen manga magazine.

This led to her being cast in 1985 in the role of Saki Asamiya in the second season of Fuji TV's Sukeban Deka, a popular live action TV series about a juvenile delinquent being forced to go undercover for the police in a high school known for its rough gangs. This role made Minamino an instant star, and many phrases from this season became fashionable. She was also nominated at the 11th Annual Japan Academy Prize event as "Rookie of the Year" for her performance in the movie version released in 1987. Her "Saki Asamiya" character was used in a wide range of adverts.

She made her singing debut on her 18th birthday in 1985 with her song Hazukashi Sugite (恥ずかし過ぎて; Too Shy to Say). Along with Shizuka Kudo, Miho Nakayama, and Yui Asaka, Minamino was considered one of the Four Divas (四天王, Shitennō) of the time until she temporarily suspended her career in 1992. In 1988 she played two roles, including the starring role, in the Taiga drama Takeda Shingen. That same year, she reached the number one spot for sales of publicity photo shots sold, setting a new record. Minamino was also honored by the country of Grenada in 1988 when they issued postage stamps featuring two different head shots.

In 1989, Minamino switched talent agencies, moving from S1 Company to the private Southern Field agency. In the 1992 film Kantsubaki, she made her first nude appearance, closely followed by her second in Watashi o Daite, Soshite Kiss-shite that same year. Minamino was nominated for the 16th Annual Japan Academy Prize for "Outstanding Performance by an Actress in a Leading Role" (basically "Best Actress") for her performances in both of these films.

Minamino has appeared in interviews and photo shoots in Shueisha's Weekly Playboy magazine since 1984. In the 1989-08-01 issue, she appeared on the cover.

== Other ventures ==
In January 2023, Minamino was appointed as a goodwill ambassador to Cambodia. She had previously visited the country in 1989 to film a television program.

== Personal life ==
In November 2023, her husband was arrested on suspicion of embezzling ¥15 million. One week later, Minamino filed for divorce.

== Filmography ==
=== Film ===
| Year | Title | Role | Notes | Ref. |
|---|---|---|---|---|
| 1987 | Sukeban Deka The Movie | Saki Asamiya | Lead role | |
| 1987 | Haikara-San: Here Comes Miss Modern | Benio Hanamura | Lead role | |
| 1988 | Bodaiju: Lindenbaum | Mami Nakahara | Lead role | |
| 1990 | The Pale Hand | Ayako Kosawa | Lead role | |
| 1990 | Gold Rush | Masami Sanokawa | Lead role | |
| 1991 | Fukuzawa Yukichi | Nobu | | |
| 1992 | Kantsubaki | Sadako Otani | Lead role | |
| 1992 | Heaven's Sin | Bookstore worker | Cameo | |
| 1992 | The Rocking Horseman | Passenger seat girl | Cameo | |
| 1992 | Hold Me and Kiss Me | Keiko Goda | Lead role | |
| 1993 | Driving High! | Kaoru Misumi | | |
| 1995 | Three Straits | Chizuru Sato | | |
| 1997 | Hissatsu Shimatsunin | Kamome | | |
| 1997 | Hissatsu Shimatsunin II | Kamome | | |
| 1997 | Hissatsu Shimatsunin III | Kamome | | |
| 1998 | The Great End: Bonno | Takako Ishigura | Lead role | |
| 2000 | Eki ni Sumi Yoshi | Yōko Kitano | Lead role | |
| 2001 | Taiga no Itteki | Ami Kawamura | | |
| 2001 | Sennen no Koi Story of Genji | Oborozukuyo | | |
| 2003 | New Battles Without Honor and Humanity/Murder | Hidemi Watanabe | | |
| 2004 | Ghost Shout | Aiko Yatabe | | |
| 2005 | Shinku | Michiko Ibara | | |
| 2009 | Donjū | Junko Mama | | |
| 2011 | Soredemo Hana wa Saiteiku "Edelweiss" | Kanako Andō | | |
| 2011 | Omurice | | | |
| 2021 | A Morning of Farewell | Yūko Wakabayashi | | |
| 2023 | Nemesis: The Mystery of the Golden Spiral | Akira Himura | | |
| 2026 | Goodbye My Car | Shizue Yasuda | | |

=== Television ===
==== Television series ====
| Year | Title | Role | Notes | Ref. |
|---|---|---|---|---|
| 1984–1985 | Meimon Shiritsu Joshi Kōkō | Yōko Kitano | Debut | |
| 1985–1986 | Sukeban Deka II: Shōjo Tekkamen Densetsu | Saki Asamiya | | |
| 1986 | Toki ni wa Issho ni | Kiyo Tagawa | | |
| 1987 | Ariesu no Otome-tachi | Kaori Mizuho | Lead role | |
| 1988 | Takeda Shingen | Okoko, Koihime | Taiga drama | |
| 1988 | Netsuppoi no! | Madoka Nanjō | Lead role | |
| 1988 | Oikaketai no! | Akira Shiratori | Lead role | |
| 1989–1990 | Aitsu ga Trouble | Reiko Misaki | Lead role | |
| 1990 | Geinō Shakai | | | |
| 1992 | What I Can Do For You | Akiko Sekine | | |
| 1993 | I Love You! | Shino Kuji | | |
| 1994 | Ō-Edo Fūunden | Sonoko | | |
| 1995 | Yureru Omoi | Kanako Yokozawa | Lead role | |
| 1996 | Shōgun no Onmitsu! Kage Jūhachi | Kunoichi no Miki | Lead role | |
| 1996 | Kitto Dareka ni Au Tame ni | | Episode 12 | |
| 1997 | Shinkansen '97 Love Story | Kyōko Tsumura | | |
| 1998 | Unnecessary Person | Ai Miyamoto | | |
| 1999 | Shin Nanbu Daikichi Kōban Nikki | | | |
| 2001 | The Woman of Science Research Institute | Misaki Kano | Season 3 Episode 1 | |
| 2002 | Ikkaku Senkin Yume Kazoku | Haruka Sugiura | Lead role, Ai no Gekijō | |
| 2002 | Haru ga Kita | Miyo | | |
| 2003 | Ikkaku Senkin Yume Kazoku 2 | Haruka Sugiura | Lead role, Ai no Gekijō | |
| 2005 | Ya • Ku • So • Ku | Yoko Ide | Lead role, Drama 30 | |
| 2006 | Yaoh | Kōko Suizenji | Episode 1 | |
| 2006 | 7 Female Lawyers | Chiharu Tashiro | | |
| 2007 | Weekly Akagawa Jirō | | Episodes 7–13 | |
| 2008 | Scrap Teacher: Teacher Rebirth | Akimi Gotokuji | | |
| 2018 | Segodon | Ikushima | Taiga drama | |
| 2020 | Hanzawa Naoki | Miyuki Hirayama | Episodes 1–4 | |
| 2020 | The Woman of Science Research Institute | Shizue Azai | Season 20 Episode 9 | |
| 2021 | Nemesis | Akira Himura | | |
| 2022 | Muchaburi! I Can't Believe I'm Going To Be President | Haruno | Episode 4 | |
| 2023–2024 | Kamen Rider Gotchard | Tamami Ichinose | | |

==== One-shot dramas ====
| Year | Title | Role | Notes | Ref. |
|---|---|---|---|---|
| 1985 | The Girl Who Leapt Through Time | Kazuko Yoshimaya | Lead role | |
| 1986 | Sailor-fuku Ren'ai Kyōshitsu: Ai no Lesson A! B! C! | | | |
| 1987 | Fujiko Fujio's Dream Camera 2 "Blue Train Blues" | Masami Otagiri | Lead role | |

== Discography ==
As of 2023, Minamino released 10 original albums, 15 compilation albums, 22 physical singles, 2 digital single and 13 home-video releases.

=== Singles ===
List of singles, with selected chart positions
| Year | Single | Peak chart positions | Formats |
| Year | Single | JPN Physical | Formats |
|---|---|---|---|
| 1985 | "Hazukashi Sugite" （恥ずかしすぎて） | 57 | CD, LP, Cassette |
| 1985 | "Sayonara no Memai" （さよならのめまい） | 15 | CD, LP, Cassette |
| 1986 | "Kanashimi Monument" （悲しみモニュメント） | 6 | CD, LP, Cassette |
| 1986 | "Kaze no Madrigal" （風のマドリガル） | 5 | CD, LP, Cassette |
| 1986 | "Approach" （接近 (アプローチ)） | 6 | CD, LP, Cassette |
| 1987 | "Rakuen no Door" （楽園のDoor） | 1 | CD, LP, Cassette |
| 1987 | "Hanashi Kaketakatta" （話しかけたかった） | 1 | CD, LP, Cassette |
| 1987 | "Pandora no Koibito" （パンドラの恋人） | 1 | CD, LP, Cassette |
| 1987 | "Aki no Indication" （秋のIndication） | 1 | CD, LP, Cassette |
| 1987 | "Haikara-san ga Tōru" （はいからさんが通る） | 1 | CD, LP, Cassette |
| 1988 | "Toiki de Net" （吐息でネット） | 1 | CD, LP, Cassette |
| 1988 | "Anata o Aishitai" （あなたを愛したい） | 1 | CD, LP, Cassette |
| 1988 | "Aki kara mo, Soba ni Ite" （秋からも、そばにいて） | 1 | CD, LP, Cassette |
| 1989 | "Namida wa Doko e Itta no" （涙はどこへいったの） | 2 | CD, LP, Cassette |
| 1989 | "Trouble Maker" （トラブル・メーカー） | 2 | CD, LP, Cassette |
| 1989 | "Film no Mukōgawa" （フィルムの向こう側） | 1 | CD, LP, Cassette |
| 1990 | "Doublegame" （ダブルゲーム） | 3 | CD, Cassette |
| 1990 | "Hen na no!!" （へんなの!!） | 11 | CD, Cassette |
| 1990 | "Mimi o Sumashite Goran" （耳をすましてごらん） | 7 | CD, Cassette |
| 1990 | "Kiss-shite Loneliness" （KISSしてロンリネス） | 9 | CD, Cassette |
| 1991 | "Natsu no Obaka-san" （夏のおバカさん） | 17 | CD, Cassette |
| 2005 | "Haikara-san ga Tōru / Toiki de Net" （はいからさんが通る/吐息でネット） | 74 | CD |

=== Digital singles ===
| Year | Single | Reference |
|---|---|---|
| 2022 | "Saishū Order" | |
| 2023 | "Ashita E no Niji" | |

=== Studio albums ===
List of albums, with selected chart positions
| Title | Album details | Peak positions |
| Title | Album details | JPN Oricon |
|---|---|---|
| Gelato | Released: April 21, 1986; Label: CBS-Sony; Formats: CD, LP, Cassette tape, digital download, streaming | 2 |
| Virginal | Released: November 1, 1986; Label: CBS-Sony; Formats: CD, LP, Cassette tape, digital download, streaming | 2 |
| Bloom | Released: May 2, 1987; Label: CBS-Sony; Formats: CD, LP, Cassette tape, digital download, streaming | 2 |
| Garland | Released: November 1, 1987; Label: CBS-Sony; Formats: CD, LP, Cassette tape, digital download, streaming | 1 |
| Global | Released: March 21, 1988; Label: CBS-Sony; Formats: CD, LP, Cassette tape, digital download, streaming; note:first press included a bonus disc titled Nanno Compatibility Diagnosis Game | 3 |
| Snowflakes | Released: December 14, 1988; Label: CBS-Sony; Formats: CD, LP, Cassette tape, digital download, streaming | 2 |
| Gauche | Released: July 12, 1989; Label: CBS-Sony; Formats: CD, LP, Cassette tape, digital download, streaming | 1 |
| Dear Christmas | Released: December 1, 1989; Label: CBS-Sony; Formats: CD, digital download, streaming | 5 |
| Gather | Released: June 23, 1990; Label: CBS-Sony; Formats: CD, digital download, streaming | 7 |
| Natsu no Obaka-san | Released: July 1, 1991; Label: CBS-Sony; Formats: CD, digital download, streaming | 13 |

=== Compilation albums ===
List of albums, with selected chart positions
| Title | Album details | Peak positions |
| Title | Album details | JPN Oricon |
|---|---|---|
| Nanno Singles | Released: March 21, 1988; Label: CBS-Sony; Formats: CD, LP, Cassette tape, | 1 |
| My Favorite Song series: Yoko's Favorites | Released: July 21, 1988; Label: CBS-Sony; Formats: CD, LP, Cassette tape, digital download, streaming; Note:includes a mini album featuring "B-side" songs with commentary | 7 |
| Nanno Songless | Released: July 15, 1990; Label: CBS-Sony; Formats: CD, LP, Cassette tape | 34 |
| NANNO Singles II | Released: January 1, 1991; Label: CBS-Sony; Formats: CD, LP, Cassette tape, digital download, streaming | 9 |
| Diamond Smile/Pearl Tears | Released: March 25, 1992; Label: CBS-Sony; Formats: CD, LP, Cassette tape, digital download, streaming | 51, 52 |
| Affairs of Yesterday | Released: June 21, 1992; Label: CBS-Sony; Formats: CD, LP, Cassette tape, digital download, streaming; Note: featuring songs selected by Minamino herself | 79 |
| Dear My Best | Released: November 21, 1992; Label: CBS-Sony; Formats: CD; Note: featuring songs selected by Minamino herself | - |
| Golden J-Pop: The Best Minamino Yoko | Released: August 21, 1998; Label: CBS-Sony; Formats: CD | - |
| 2000 My Best Yoko Minamino | Released: June 21, 2000; Label: CBS-Sony; Formats: CD | - |
| Dream Price 1000 Minamino Yoko Rakuten no Door | Released: October 9, 2001; Label: CBS-Sony; Formats: CD | - |
| Golden Best Minamino Yoko Singles III | Released: June 17, 2003; Label: CBS-Sony; Formats: CD, digital download, streaming | - |
| Nanno Anniversary 25th | Released: November 11, 2010; Label: CBS-Sony; Formats: CD, digital download, streaming | - |
| ReFined Songs Collection: Nanno 25th Anniversary | Released:February 9, 2011; Label: CBS-Sony; Formats: CD, digital download, streaming | 95 |
| Golden Idol Minamino Yoko 30th Anniversary | Released: February 9, 2015; Label: CBS-Sony; Formats: CD | 38 |
| Nanno Singles Collection 1985-1991+1 | Released: February 9, 2015; Label: CBS-Sony; Formats: digital download, streaming | - |
| Four Seasons Nanno Selection | Released: December 8, 2021; Label: CBS-Sony; Formats: CD, digital download, streaming | 37 |
"—" denotes items which did not chart

=== Box set ===
List of albums, with selected chart positions
| Title | Album details | Peak positions |
| Title | Album details | JPN Oricon |
|---|---|---|
| NANNO BOX | Released: June 22, 2005; Label: CBS-Sony; Formats: 10CD+1DVD | 142 |
| Nanno Soundtracks + Songless | Released: June 21, 2006; Label: CBS-Sony; Formats: 6CD, digital download | - |
"—" denotes items which did not chart

=== Soundtracks ===
List of albums, with selected chart positions
| Title | Album details | Peak positions |
| Title | Album details | JPN Oricon |
|---|---|---|
| Sukeban Deka II: Shōjo Tekkamen Densetsu Original Soundtrack | Released: May 21, 1986; Label: CBS-Sony; Formats: CD, LP, Cassette tape | - |
| Sukeban Deka Original Soundtrack | Released: March 5, 1987; Label: CBS-Sony; Formats: CD, LP, Cassette tape | - |
| Haikara-san ga Tōru Original Soundtrack | Released: December 21, 1987; Label: CBS-Sony; Formats: CD, LP, Cassette tape | - |
| Badaiju: Rindenbaumu Original Soundtrack | Released: August 13, 1988; Label: LP; Formats: CD, LP, Cassette tape | - |
| ORE Special Collection: 5-nin no Idol-tachi | Released: 1988; Label: CBS-Sony; Formats: CD, LP, Cassette tape | - |
| Bakumatsu 2001 Original Soundtrack | Released: October 23, 2001; Label: CBS-Sony; Formats: CD, LP, Cassette tape | - |
| Sukeban Deka Last Memorial: Asamiya Saki yo Eien ni | Released: September 20, 2006; Label: CBS-Sony; Formats: CD; Notes:also features Yuki Saitō and Yui Asaka | - |
"—" denotes items which did not chart

=== Home-video DVD ===
List of albums, with selected chart positions
| Title | Album details | Peak positions |
| Title | Album details | JPN Oricon |
|---|---|---|
| Tokimeki, kudasai | Released: June 21, 1986; Label: CBS-Sony; Formats: VHS, LD | - |
| First Concert | Released: November 1, 1986; Label: CBS-Sony; Formats: VHS, LD | - |
| Nanno Club | Released: July 22, 1987; Label: CBS-Sony; Formats: VHS, LD | - |
| Summer Concert | Released: November 21, 1987; Label: CBS-Sony; Formats: VHS, LD | - |
| Colorful Ave | Released: August 1, 1988; Label: CBS-Sony; Formats: VHS, LD | - |
| ETE DU CINEMA YOKO MINAMINO SUMMER CONCERT '88 | Released: December 21, 1988; Label: CBS-Sony; Formats: VHS, LD | - |
| Omoi no mama ni YOKO MINAMINO SUMMER CONCERT '89 | Released: November 22, 1989; Label: CBS-Sony; Formats: VHS, LD | - |
| Just Sweet Love | Released: November 24, 1989; Label: CBS-Sony; Formats: VHS, LD | - |
| Hen Nano! | Released: September 21, 1990; Label: CBS-Sony; Formats: VHS | - |
| Abend/Toki no Nagare ni | Released: November 21, 1990; Label: CBS-Sony; Formats: VHS | - |
| Dear my Best | Released: November 21, 1992; Label: CBS-Sony; Formats: VHS | - |
| NANNO DVD BOX | Released: September 28, 2005; Label: CBS-Sony; Formats: 12DVD | - |
| NANNO 30th&31st Anniversary | Released: February 22, 2017; Label: CBS-Sony; Formats: DVD | - |
| Minamino Yoko The Best Ten collection | Released: June 26, 2024; Label: CBS-Sony; Formats: Blu-Ray | - |
"—" denotes items which did not chart

== Commercial tie-ins ==
Minamino has performed the theme songs for multiple television series and movies, and her music has been used in many commercials. Following is a list of some of them.

| Song title | Japanese title | Description of use | Notes |
|---|---|---|---|
| Sayonara no Memai | さよならのめまい | Insert song for Sukeban Deka II: Shōjo Tekkamen Densetsu series | for Fuji TV |
| Approach | 接近 (アプローチ) | Theme song for Toki o Kakeru Shōjo | for Fuji TV |
| Kanashimi Monument | 悲しみモニュメント | Theme song for Sukeban Deka II: Shōjo Tekkamen Densetsu series | for Fuji TV |
| Kaze no Madrigal | 風のマドリガル | Theme song for Sukeban Deka II: Shōjo Tekkamen Densetsu series | for Fuji TV |
| Rakuen no Door | 楽園のDoor | Theme song for the movie Sukeban Deka | |
| Yuki no Kahen(Hana) | 雪の花片 | Commercial for the Onkyo "Radian" midi hi-fi system | |
| Hiruyasumi no Yūutsu | 昼休みの憂鬱 | Commercial for Fujitsu Personal Computers FM77AV40EX model | |
| Aki no Indication | 秋のIndication | Commercial for Cecil Chocolate from Glico | |
| Haikara-san ga Tōru | はいからさんが通る | Used multiple times: 1. Theme song for the movie Haikara-san ga Tōru; 2. Commercial for Fujicolor film from Fujifilm | |
| Ame no Mukōgawa | 雨のむこうがわ | Commercial for the Onkyo "Radian" midi hi-fi system | |
| Toiki de Net | 吐息でネット | Commercial for "Fitnet Lipstick" and the "Spring Bazaar" from Kanebo | |
| Aki kara mo, Soba ni Ite | 秋からも、そばにいて | Commercial for "Almond Chocolate" and "Pocky" from Glico | |
| Carib ni Ikitai | カリブに行きたい | Commercial for the FM77AV40EX computer by Fujitsu Personal Computers | |
| Anata o Aishitai | あなたを愛したい | Used multiple times: 1. Theme song from the movie Badaiju: Rindenbaumu; 2. Commercial for JR West "WENS" service | |
| Just Sweet Love | | Commercial for "Cecil Chocolate" from Glico | |
| Lift no Shita de Aimashō | リフトの下で逢いましょう | Commercial for "Ski Train JR Spur-gō" for JR West | |
| Namida wa Doko e Itta no | 涙はどこへいったの | Commercial for "WENS" service from JR West | |
| Hitomi no Naka no Mirai | 瞳のなかの未来 | Opening theme song for the NHK series Aoi Blink | |
| Summer Fragrance | サマー・フレグランス | Commercial for JR West | |
| Mimi o Sumashite Goran | 耳をすましてごらん | Theme song for Itsuka Mita Aoi Sora on Nippon Television | |
| Omoi no Mama ni (new version) | 思いのままに | Message song for the NTV Nippon Television 24-Hour "TV-Ai wa Chikyū o Sukū" campaign | |
| Kiss-shite Loneliness | KISSしてロンリネス | Commercial for "Cool, Nikki, Basshon" candy drops from Asadaame | |
| Lonely Blue | | Commercial for the Nagoya Railroad "MediaCard" | |

== Video ==
- Tokimeki, Kudasai (1986-06-21)
- First Concert (1986-11-01)
- Nanno Club (1987-07-22)
- Summer Concert (1987-11-21)
- From Summer Concert (1987-11-21)
- Colorful Ave. (1988-08-01)
- Etu du Cinema Yoko Minamino Summer Concert '88 (1988-12-21)
- Omoi no Mama ni: Yoko Minamino Summer Concert '89 (1989-11-22)
- Just Sweet Love (1989-11-24, promo item never offered for sale)
- Abend (1990-11-21)
- Toki no Nagare ni: The Last Day of Tour 1991 in Sunplaza Hall by Yoko Minamino (1991-11-21)
- Dear My Best (1992-11-21)
- Nanno DVD Box (2005-09-28, complete compilation of her performances in movies)

== Books ==
=== Photo ===
- Yōko o Hitorijime... (陽子をひとりじめ…) (April 1986, Kodansha, Photographer: Seiichi Nomura)
- Sukeban Deka II Shashinshū (スケバン刑事II写真集) (September 1986, Hakusensha, Photographer: Ryū Ōmatsu)
- Eiga Sukeban Deka Shashinshū: Ai no Sailor-fuku Senshi (映画スケバン刑事写真集 愛のセーラー服戦士) (1987, Bandai Visual)
- Ki no Mama Tenshi Fūrai (生のまま天使風来) (November 1988, Wani Books, Photographer: Seiichi Nomura)
- My Dear (January 1991, CBS-Sony Shuppan, Photographers: Seiichi Nomura, et al.)
- Great (April 1991, Kodansha, Photographers: Hajime Sawatari, et al.)
- Flowers (October 2004, Shueisha, Photographer: Yorihito Yamauchi)

=== Other ===
- Tsukiyo no Kushami (月夜のくしゃみ) (September 1989, Kadokawa Shoten)

== Awards ==
| Year | Award | Category | Work(s) | Result |
|---|---|---|---|---|
| 1988 | 11th Japan Academy Prize | Newcomer of the Year | Sukeban Deka The Movie | Won |
| 1988 | 42nd Mainichi Film Awards | Newcomer Award | Sukeban Deka The Movie and Haikara-San: Here Comes Miss Modern | Won |
| 1988 | 12th Elan d'or Awards | Newcomer of the Year | Herself | Won |
| 1993 | 14th Yokohama Film Festival | Best Actress | Kantsubaki, Watashi o Daite, Soshite Kiss-shite | Won |
| 1993 | 16th Japan Academy Prize | Best Actress | Kantsubaki | Nominated |
