= Dotsuitarunen =

- Theatrical release poster

Japanese name
- Kana: どついたるねん
- Directed by: Junji Sakamoto
- Written by: Junji Sakamoto
- Produced by: Genjiro Arato
- Starring: Hidekazu Akai; Haruko Sagara; Akaji Maro; Yoshio Harada
- Cinematography: Norimichi Kasamatsu
- Edited by: Kazuhiro Hara
- Production company: Genjiro Arato Pictures
- Distributed by: Cinema Placet
- Release date: November 11, 1989 (Japan)
- Running time: 110 minutes
- Country: Japan
- Language: Japanese

Dotsuitarunen (Japanese: どついたるねん), also known as Knockout, is a 1989 Japanese film directed by Junji Sakamoto.

== Cast ==
- Hidekazu Akai
- Haruko Sagara
- Akaji Maro
- Yoshio Harada

== Awards and nominations ==
11th Yokohama Film Festival

- Won: Best Film
- Won: Best New Director - Junji Sakamoto
- Won: Best Supporting Actor - Yoshio Harada
- Won: Best Supporting Actress - Haruko Sagara
- Won: Best Newcomer - Hidekazu Akai
