= Ninja Captor =

Japanese tokusatsu TV series

- Title card
- Genre: Tokusatsu
- Created by: Saburo Yatsude
- Developed by: Masaru Igami
- Directed by: Hideo Tanaka
- Starring: Daisuke Ban, Hiroyuki Satou, Sanpei Godai, Sen Utsumi, Yuuko Matsuyou, Taikou Rin, Kenji Ushio, Ai Nogawa
- Narrated by: Goro Naya
- Opening theme: "Fight! Ninja Captor" by Ichirou Mizuki, Mitsuko Horie, Koorogi '73
- Ending theme: "Captors of the Open Skies" by Ichirou Mizuki, Mitsuko Horie, Koorogi '73
- Composer: Akihiro Komori
- Country of origin: Japan
- No. of episodes: 43

Production
- Running time: 30 minutes

Original release
- Network: Tokyo Channel 12
- Release: April 7, 1976 – January 26, 1977

Ninja Captor (忍者キャプター, Ninja Kyaputā) is a Japanese tokusatsu TV series which aired from April 7, 1976, to January 26, 1977. It appeared on TV Tokyo, Channel 12, and was produced by Toei Company, Ltd. Ninja Captor is similar to Toei's own Super Sentai series (it has been sometimes included in Super Sentai chronology as the second installment) and aired during the run of Himitsu Sentai Gorenger.

== Story ==
The character Daisuke Izumo graduates from Fuma Ninja Army, a secret army aiming for the conquest of Japan. He instead escapes and becomes the leader of the "Captor," a ninja team supervised by Mujin Tendo. The Captor team's mission is to battle the ninja sent out by the general of the Fuma Ninja Army, Retsufu Fuma.

== Captor team ==
- Fire-Ninja Captor 7 (火忍キャプター7, Ka-Nin Kyaputā Sebun)/Daisuke Izumo (出雲 大介, Izumo Daisuke). 21 years old. Although he is an elite graduate student of the Fūma Ninja Group, he turns against them when General Retsufū Fūma begins aiming for conquest in Japan. He decides to become a ninja, and is appointed as the leader of the Captors by the former teacher Mujin Tendō.
  - Weapon: Fire Wheel Bullet (火輪弾, Hi Rindan)
  - Technique: Fire Escape (火遁, Hi Ton)
  - Color: Red
  - Element: Fire
- Wind-Ninja Captor 6 (風忍キャプター6, Kaze-Nin Kyaputā Shikkusu)/Keita Izumi (泉 敬太, Izumi Keita). 15 years old. He one of the youngest Captors and a third-year middle school student. He is very friendly and trusts his classmates strongly, but he is reckless and often stumbles in his efforts. After Nindo Kurayami dies in the final episode, he and Maria are engaged to be married.
  - Weapon: Wind Shell (風貝, Kaze Kai)
  - Color: Green
  - Element: Air
- Gold-Ninja Captor 5 (金忍キャプター5, Kane-Nin Kyaputā Faibu)/Noboru Oyama (大山 昇, Ōyama Noboru). 17 years old. A high school student who is a ninja in training and is responsible for the maintenance of Captor Car and Captor Machine. He also works part-time at the electronics store.
  - Weapon: Disk (円盤, Enban)
  - Color: Yellow
  - Element: Metal
- Ground-Ninja Captor 4 (土忍キャプター4, Tsuchi-Nin Kyaputā Fō)/Dan Kurokawa (黒川 団, Kurokawa Dan). 23 years old. Has extraordinary hearing ability. He is in charge of operating the Captor Machine. He usually works out at the wrestling gym and works part-time in the transportation industry.
  - Weapon: Ground Staff (土棒, Tsuchi Bō)
  - Color: Brown
  - Element: Earth
- Flower-Ninja Captor 3 I (初代花忍キャプター3, Shodai Hana-Nin Kyaputā Surī)/María Sakurakoji (桜小路 マリア, Sakurakōji Maria). 15 years old. She poses as Keita's guardian and has a bright personality. Keita refers to her as his wife. After the devastation of the Fūma Ninja Group, she is invited to attend ninja society college in the United States. After Nindo Kurayami is killed in the final episode, she and Keita are engaged to be married.
  - Weapon: Flower Nunchaku (花ヌンチャク, Hana Nunchaku)
  - Color: Pink
  - Element: Nature
- Flower-Ninja Captor 3 II (二代目花忍キャプター3, Nidaime Hana-Nin Kyaputā Surī)/Miki Tendō (天堂 美樹, Tendō Miki): 15 years old. Mujin's granddaughter. Initially not a Captor, she becomes Maria's successor after Maria attends college in the United States.
- Water-Ninja Captor 2 (水忍キャプター2, Mizu-Nin Kyaputā Tsū)/Sakon Shijo (四条 左近, Shijō Sakon). 22 years old. A third-year student of the Naboku University who also works as a swimming instructor.
  - Weapon: Rapid Stream Gun (激流砲, Gekiryū Hō)
  - Color: Blue
  - Element: Water
- Thunder-Ninja Captor 1 (雷忍キャプター1, Rai-Nin Kyaputā Wan)/Saburobei Fukuro (袋 三郎兵衛, Fukuro Saburōbē). 45 years old. A sentimental butler of Mujin Tendō and the oldest of the Captors. He hates dust and likes to keep the house tidy. He is also good at finding things by using his nose.
  - Weapon: Electric Rope (電気縄, Denki Jō)
  - Color: Orange
  - Element: Thunder

== Staff ==
- Created by Saburo Yatsude
- Produced by Toru Hirayama, Kohito Ono, Bakosu Kondo
- Directed by Hideo Tanaka, Atsuo Okunaka, Daisuke Yamazaki, Kyomi Nakamura
- Teleplays by Masaru Igami, Shukei Nagasaka, Chikusa Enda, Mikio Matsushita
- Character Design by Yuki Hijiri
- Action Choreography by Kazutoshi Takahashi
- Music by Akihiro Omori
- Theme Songs: Opening "Fight! Ninja Captors", and Ending "Captors of the Open Skies" (vocals by Ichirou Mizuki, Mitsuko Horie, Koorogi '73)

== Cast ==
- Daisuke Izumo: Daisuke Ban (伴 大介, Ban Daisuke) (as Naoya Ban (伴 直弥, Ban Naoya))
- Keita Izumi: Hiroyuki Satō (佐藤 宏之, Satō Hiroyuki)
- Noboru Ōyama: Sanpei Godai (伍代 参平, Godai Sanpei) (as Yoshiyuki Fujie (藤江 喜幸, Fujie Yoshiyuki))
- Dan Kurokawa: Sen Utsumi (宇津海 仙, Utsumi Sen)
- María Sakurakōji: Yūko Matsuba (松葉 夕子, Matsuba Yūko)
- Miki Tendō: Ai Nogawa (野川 愛, Nogawa Ai)
- Sakon Shijō: Taikō Rin (林 大興, Rin Taikō)
- Saburōbei Fukuro: Kenji Ushio (潮 健児, Ushio Kenji)
- Mujin Tendō(1-37): Makoto Tagiri (高桐 真, Tagiri Makoto)
- Hakūn Togakushi(37-43): Takamaru Sasaki (佐々木 孝丸, Sasaki Takamaru)
- Jūrō Ōmori: Nobuyuki Nakano (中野 宣之, Nakano Nobuyuki)
- Hyōdai Kōtō: Kuhisa Nakayama (中山 久史, Nakayama Kuhisa)
- Kansuke Yamahara: Shōtoshi Ōyama (大山 正明, Ōyama Shōtoshi)
- Tamibe Itō: Kyōhito Fuyama (富山 匡人, Fuyama Kyōhito)
- Magoyatsu Imura: Masahiro Kamiya (神谷 政浩, Kamiya Masahiro)
- Kenta Yaki: Ikki Onoda (斧田 一規, Onada Ikki)
- Ayame Mizuno: Misaki Suzuki (鈴木 美咲, Suzuki Misaki)
- Retsufū Fūma/Nindō Kurayami: Shinzō Hotta (堀田 眞三, Hotta Shinzō)
- Officer Kageyama: Jōriki Gono (五野 上力, Gono Jōriki)
- Officer Sanada: Sanji Kojima (小島 三児, Kojima Sanji)
- Officer Hattori: Iwao Dan (団 巌, Dan Iwao)
- Narrator: Goro Naya (納谷 悟朗, Naya Gorō)

== Episode list ==
1. The Seven Ninjas Rise at the Tokyo Tower (東京タワーに立つ七人の忍者, Tokyō Tawā ni Tatsu Shichi Nin no Ninja)
2. The Secret of the Rocket Ninja Arts (ロケット忍法の秘密, Roketto Ninpō no Himitsu)
3. The Ninjas Disappeared in the Walls of the Building!? (ビルの壁に忍者が消えた!?, Biru no Kabe ni Ninja ga Kieta!?)
4. The Sky-flying Octopus Ninja! Dogfight!! (空飛ぶタコ忍者! 空中戦!!, Soratobu Tako Ninja! Kūchūsen!!)
5. The Captor Massacre Strategy (キャプター皆殺し作戦, Kyaputā Minnagoroshi Sakusen)
6. A Great Escape! Ninja Lessons!! (大脱走! 忍者塾!!, Dai Dassō! Ninja Juku!)
7. Mystery: The Stolen Face?! (ミステリー・ぬすまれた顔!?, Misuterī・Nusumareta Kao?!)
8. Crash! Highway Ninja War (激突! ハイウェー忍者戦, Gekitotsu! Haiuē Ninja Sen)
9. Friend or Foe? The Woman Ninja (敵か味方か? 女忍者, Teki ka Mikata ka? Onna Ninja)
10. Mystery! Robot Usage (怪奇! ロボット使い, Kaiki! Robotto Tsukai)
11. The Poisonous Gas Ninja is Immortal (毒ガス忍者は不死身, Doku Gasu Ninja wa Fujimi)
12. SOS Wind-Nin Captor 6 (SOS風忍キャプター6, Esu Ō Esu Kaze Nin Kyaputā Shikkusu)
13. The Great Treasure of Illusion (まぼろしの大秘宝, Maboroshi no Dai Hihō)
14. Fire-Nin Captor Dies Twice (火忍キャプターは二度死ぬ, Ka Nin Kyaputā wa Nido Shinu)
15. The Ogre from the Manji Valley! (まんじ谷から鬼が来た!, Manji Tani kara Oni ga Kita!)
16. The Daughter of the Hidden Ninja is a Classmate (隠れ忍者の娘は同級生, Kakure Ninja no Musume wa Dōkyūsei)
17. Aiming at the Fake Note Expert (狙われたニセ札名人, Nerawareta Nise Satsu Meijin)
18. Ninja Arts! Kabutomushi Change!! (忍法! カブト虫変化!!, Ninpō! Kabutomushi Henga)
19. Fuma Boy Ninja is a Close Friend (親友は風魔少年忍者, Shin'yū wa Fūma Shōnen Ninja)
20. Ninja Skills Expert of the Black Piano (黒いピアノの忍術師, Kuroi Piano no Ninjutsu Nori)
21. Decisive Battle at Fuma's Graveyard is a Campsite! (キャンプ場は風魔の墓場の決戦!, Kyanpu Shō wa Fūma no Hakaba no Kessen!)
22. Fuma Appeared in the Ghost Residence!! (お化け屋敷に風魔が出た!!, Obake Yashiki ni Fūma ga Deta!!)
23. Priest Roadperson! Ground-Nin! Comparing Techniques (ニュドオ道人! 土忍! 術くらべ, Nyudō Michi Jin! Tsuchi Nin! Shutsu Kurabe)
24. Fire-Nin is working on the Underworld Whistle (火忍をあやつる地獄笛, Ka Nin o Ayatsuru Jigoku Fue)
25. Dreadful! Keita Betrayed!! (大変! 敬太が裏切った!!, Taihen! Keita ga Uragitta!!)
26. Retsufu Fuma! Die!! (風魔烈風! 死す!!, Fūma Retsufū! Shisu!!)
27. A New Enemy! Koka Ninja Group (新しい敵! 甲賀忍者団!, Atarashī Teki! Koka Ninja Dan!)
28. Enrollment: Tendo Ninja Lessons (入門 天堂忍者塾, Nyūmon Tendō Ninja Juku)
29. Conjurer of Riddle! The Card Talks!? (謎の手品師! カードがしゃべる!?, Nazo no Teshinashi! Kādo ga Shaberu!?)
30. The Black Trap of the Ninja Technique Residence (忍術屋敷の黒い罠, Ninjutsu Yashiku no Kuroi Wana)
31. Izuyama's confrontation!! (伊豆山の対決!!, Izuyama no Taiketsu!!)
32. Play-off of the Distant Seas!! (絶海の決戦!!, Sekkai no Kessen!!)
33. Great Pursuit! Ninja Bus! (大追跡! 忍者バス!, Dai Tsuiseki! Ninja Basu!)
34. The Demonic Hands comes out the Telephone Receiver! (電話器から悪魔の手が出る!, Denwa ki kara Akuma no Te ga Deru!)
35. The Terrifying Butterfly Human (恐怖の蝶人間, Kyōfu no Chō Ningen)
36. Seven Countenance is Grim Reaper (死神は七面相, Shinigami wa Nana Mensō)
37. The End of Mujin Tendo (天堂無人の最後, Tendō Mujin no Saigo)
38. Hakun Togakushi's Assassination Plot!! (戸隠白雲暗殺計画!!, Togakushi Hakūn Ansatsu Keikaku!!)
39. The Sense Power Ninja Aims for the Children of ESP (念力忍者が超能力の子供を狙う, Nenriki Ninja ga Chōnōryoku no Kodomo o Newau)
40. Careful! New Year's Present from Ninjas!? (御用心! 忍者からのお年玉!?, Goyōjin! Ninja kara no Otoshidama!?)
41. Laughing Dolls (笑う人形, Warau Ningyō)
42. Dark Glass! Ninja Classroom?! (やみがらす! 忍者教室!?, Yami Garasu! Ninja Kyūshitsu?!)
43. The End of Nindo Kurayami (暗闇忍堂の最期, Kurayami Nindō no Saigo)

== International broadcast ==
- In Thailand, the series aired on Channel 7 from 10:00 to 10:30 on Saturdays and Sundays entitled chet ninja (7 นินจา, "7 ninjas") around 1983–1984.
