= Sukeban Deka =

Japanese manga series

- Cover of the first tankōbon volume, featuring Saki Asamiya

スケバン刑事
- Genre: Action, Detective
- Manga
- Written by: Shinji Wada
- Published by: Hakusensha
- Imprint: Hana to Yume Comics
- Magazine: Hana to Yume
- Original run: 1975 – 1982
- Volumes: 22
- Television drama
- Directed by: Tarō Sakamoto; Hideo Tanaka; Michio Konishi; Morio Maejima
- Written by: Noboru Sugimura; Tokio Tsuchiya; Akira Umino; Umihiko Tōno; Ichirō Yamanaka; Izō Hashimoto
- Studio: Fuji Television; Toei Company
- Original network: FNS (Fuji TV)
- Original run: April 11, 1985 – October 30, 1985
- Episodes: 24
- Television drama

Sukeban Deka II: Shōjo Tekkamen Densetsu
- Directed by: Hideo Tanaka, Toshio Ōi, Tarō Sakamoto, Morio Maejima
- Written by: Tokio Tsuchiya, Izō Hashimoto, Noboru Sugimura, Hiroshi Toda, Ichirō Yamanaka
- Studio: Fuji Television; Toei Company
- Original network: FNS (Fuji TV)
- Original run: November 7, 1985 – October 23, 1986
- Episodes: 42
- Television drama

Sukeban Deka III: Shōjo Ninpō-chō Denki
- Directed by: Hideo Tanaka, Toshio Ōi, Tarō Sakamoto, Morio Maejima
- Written by: Tokio Tsuchiya, Izō Hashimoto, Masayoshi Azuma, Junki Takegami, Kazuhiko Gōdo
- Studio: Fuji Television; Toei Company
- Original network: FNS (Fuji TV)
- Original run: October 30, 1986 – October 29, 1987
- Episodes: 42
- Original video animation
- Directed by: Hirota Takeshi
- Produced by: Kazuyoshi Hirose
- Written by: Hirota Takeshi
- Music by: Takatsugu Takao
- Studio: Sido Limited
- Licensed by: ADV Films
- Released: April 21, 1991 – July 21, 1991
- Runtime: 50 minutes each
- Episodes: 2
- Live-action films
- Sukeban Deka The Movie (1987); Counter-Attack from the Kazama Sisters (1988); Yo-Yo Girl Cop (2006)
- Manga

Sukeban Deka If
- Written by: Shinji Wada
- Published by: Media Factory
- Imprint: MF Comics
- Published: June 23, 2004
- Volumes: 1
- Manga

Toki o Kakeru Sukeban Deka
- Written by: Saori Muronaga
- Published by: Akita Shoten
- Magazine: Monthly Princess
- Original run: January 6, 2021 – present
- Manga

Re: Sukeban Deka
- Written by: Ashibi Fukui
- Published by: Akita Shoten
- Magazine: Monthly Princess
- Original run: February 5, 2021 – present
- Manga

Sukeban Deka Pretend
- Written by: Sai Ihara
- Illustrated by: Shingi Hosokawa
- Published by: Akita Shoten
- Magazine: Monthly Princess
- Original run: August 6, 2021 – present

Sukeban Deka (スケバン刑事(デカ), lit. 'Delinquent Girl Detective') is a Japanese manga series written and illustrated by Shinji Wada. It was serialized in Hana to Yume from 1975 to 1982 and collected into 22 volumes. Sukeban Deka has been adapted into three live-action television series, an original video animation (OVA) series, and three feature films, the last of which was released as Yo-Yo Girl Cop in 2006. It has also inspired four spin-off manga: Sukeban Deka If (スケバン刑事if), a short story collection published in 2004, and Toki o Kakeru Sukeban Deka (時をかけるスケバン刑事), Re: Sukeban Deka (Re:スケバン刑事), and Sukeban Deka Pretend (スケバン刑事 Pretend), three ongoing series that premiered in Monthly Princess in 2021.

== Plot ==
A 16-year-old sukeban (delinquent schoolgirl) named Saki Asamiya is offered by the police to become an undercover detective to escape prison. She initially refuses, so the police blackmail her by offering to pardon her mother, who is on death row for killing her husband, eventually forcing her to accept. Put under the tutelage of officer Kyouichiro Jin, she is given a metal yo-yo that doubles as a weapon as well as a police badge, and is made to infiltrate high schools around Japan to investigate and stop criminal activities. Her first destination is her former school, Takanoha High School, where Saki's place has been taken by the three Mizuchi sisters and their ring of illegal activities.

== Characters ==
Saki Asamiya (麻宮 サキ, Asamiya Saki)
The bitter heroine of the story, a natural born fighter who enjoys getting into scuffles with various people. Saki is blackmailed into becoming a secret investigator. She never backs down and is very stubborn. Her main weapon is a steel loaded yo-yo capable to function as a weapon.
Kyoichiro Jin (神 恭一郎, Jin Kyōichirō)
Saki's mentor in the police, a long-haired, English-Japanese man who worked for Scotland Yard. He is cold-blooded and protective of Saki.
Dark Director (暗闇 警視, Kurayami Keishi)
The man who recruited Saki, a shady police officer who is in charge of the Sukeban Deka program.
Natsu Asamiya (麻宮 ナツ, Asamiya Natsu)
Saki's mother. She only loved her other daughter Miyuki and abused Saki as a result, and was arrested for beating her husband to death in front of Saki. Despite Saki's efforts to save her from execution, Natsu hates her, especially after Miyuki's death, and later joins Shigaraki in order to have Saki dead. In the TV series, she is a completely different character. She never abused Saki and was not guilty of her husband's death, although she certainly thought so and could not forgive herself for it.
Sanpei Nowaki (野分 三平, Nowaki Sanpei)
Saki's ardent admirer, who calls her "his goddess" and follows her all over the school campus.
Junko Yuina (唯名 純子, Yuina Junko)
Saki's best friend. A shy, quiet girl, Junko is a talented artist and she is seen as a threat by Emi Mizuchi who vows to sabotage her. In the OVA after Emi finds her beautiful painting, she has it stolen. Junko is kidnapped, forcefully drugged and then left dead on train tracks. Her death makes Saki's mission personal. In the manga, she was killed by Ayumi and her gang, who made it look like a suicide initially, but Saki noticed that Junko was bitten by a venomous snake.
Agura (アグラ)
Saki's rival in prison. Agura is a tough, masculine looking woman who dislikes Saki at first but then begins to respect her. Eventually she is released from reform school with Chie, and acts as her bodyguard. She only appeared in the manga.
Chie Mishio (美汐 千江, Mishio Chie) / Chii (チイ, Chī)
Saki's kind friend in prison. She only appeared in the manga. She has a pleasant demeanor and is less aggressive than the other girls. She is released from reform school and returns to high school. Chie joins a biology club that loves to collect insects, and since then discovered a species of butterfly that was named after her. She and Agura are eventually involved in a missing persons case that Saki investigates.
Kaoru (カオル)
Saki's hyper friend who is also very vulnerable and ends up being attacked a lot by the other girls in the prison. To help Saki escape from prison, she ends up seducing the prison warden who is a lesbian. She used to be in a drama club, and often played the roles of men. She only appeared in the manga.
Mio Kaido (海堂 美尾, Kaidō Mio)
Jin's partner. She only appeared in the manga.
Hikuidori
A scheming, sly cellmate of Saki's. She has a mole under one eye. Hikuidori becomes friends with Saki at first but then betrays her and turns out to be an informant of Remi's. She only appeared in the manga.
Gozo Mizuchi (海槌 剛三, Mizuchi Gōzō)
The patriarch of the antagonist Mizuchi crime family. Gozo uses his influence to control his family's power over Takanoha High school. He is a politician, and frames his rivals for the crimes committed by his daughters.
Emi Mizuchi (海槌 詠巳, Mizuchi Emi)
The youngest sister who is an artist. Emi is an egomaniac who sees herself as a great artist when at best her talent is borderline, which leads her to use her father's influence to bribe judges and copy the works of other artists. Emi steals Junko's work and copies from it to win an art contest. In the OVA she is killed along with her father by a brainwashed assassin sent by Remi. In the manga, Emi is shot by an assassin sent by Remi but survives and is taken to the hospital.
Ayumi Mizuchi (海槌 亜悠巳, Mizuchi Ayumi)
The dark haired middle child of the Mizuchi family. She has four hulking bodyguards who follow her around for protection. Ayumi is a drug addict and dealer, and is extremely greedy. However, she is the least evil out of the Mizuchi sisters. Despite her cold demeanor, she is loyal to her father and sisters. In both the OVA and manga, she is betrayed and killed by Remi, who gives her a malfunctioning shotgun that backfires, and steals all her money. In the manga, Ayumi rides a motorcycle and controls her own biker gang. She bets on the races for money, and anything goes, including harming the other racers, using traps, or killing other racers. Her favorite tactic is to throw venomous snakes at racers behind her, which bite and kill them.
Remi Mizuchi (海槌 麗巳, Mizuchi Remi)
The eldest daughter, a beautiful blonde who is completely ruthless and sociopathic. When Remi first arrives at the high school, many of the students admire her because of her striking beauty. She is a former friend to Saki, but she serves as a deadly antagonist to her. She seems to be the least dangerous of the three sisters but in fact is the most. She is responsible for Junko's death, setting up Ayumi's death to steal her money with a malfunctioning shotgun to fight Saki, and a brainwashed assassin to kill her father Gozo and sister Emi. She refers to Saki about their "blood of madness" but the drama version expands on it by using Saki's mother's past. Throughout the manga series, Remi goes as far to impersonate Saki's sister Miyuki. She even cruelly murders Sanpei to get revenge on Saki as well.
The Elite Four (四天王, Shitenno)
Ayumi's four bodyguards. Only one does all the talking. He is the tallest and his weapon is a wooden sword.
Another bodyguard uses brass knuckles, the third uses a bike chain, and the fourth bodyguard uses a pair of nunchucks. They appear in the OVA only.
Ayumi's followers
In the manga, Ayumi's followers are two girls, one named Chibi and the other one's name is not mentioned. Chibi is small and thin with dark hair while the other girl has feathered blonde hair and is obese. These two girls are very skilled fighters.
Remi's followers
In the OVA, Remi's control method is explained as computer programs and drugs.
Aoko Narumi (鳴海 碧子, Narumi Aoko)
Her true name being Aoko Shigaraki, she is the adoptive granddaughter of Ro and a former close friend of Remi Mizuchi. Trained by Natsu to defeat Saki, she seeks revenge for the death of Remi.
Rou Shigaraki (信楽 老, Shigaraki Rō)
The elderly founder of the world-famous evil organization Cat (Neko), he's implied to be superhuman, as he has been alive since the Tokugawa shogunate. He manipulates Aoko into following his plans.
Kazuhiko Haniwa (埴輪 一彦, Haniwa Kazuhiko)
The leader of the Blue Wolf League (青狼会, Seiroukai), a sinister organization bent on controlling the schools of the country. He allies dangerously with Shigaraki.

== Media ==
=== Manga ===
The creation of Sukeban Deka was the result of a misunderstanding between the author Shinji Wada and the editors at Hakusensha. Wada was developing a high school drama, but the publisher expected a detective story starring a high school student. At an impasse, Wada decided to combine the two concepts. Wada first published a pilot chapter titled "Kōsha wa Moete Iruka?" (校舎は燃えているか？, lit. "Is the School Building Burning?") in the August 5, 1975 (No. 15) issue of Hana to Yume magazine. Later, Sukeban Deka became a serial, starting in the January 5, 1976 (No. 1) issue of the same magazine, released in 1975. Disappointed that he could never end a complete serial before, Wada planned earlier in production a dramatic final scene in which the protagonist would die. The last chapter of this original planning was serialized in the December 20, 1977 (No. 24) issue, and was followed by an epilogue in the January 20, 1978 (No. 2) issue.

Following Sukeban Deka's conclusion, Wada started a new serial, Pygmalio, in the March 20, 1978 (No. 6) issue of Hana to Yume. However, after one year of serialization, the series was poorly received by readers, and Wada stopped it to restart Sukeban Deka. Wada dubbed it as "part 2", and Sukeban Deka resumed in the February 5, 1979 (No. 3) issue, announced as a "new series". The manga ran regularly in Hana to Yume until its December 5, 1982 (No. 24) issue.

Since the original serialization, Sukeban Deka has been printed in four different collected editions; the original twenty-two volume tankōbon publication started on April 20, 1976, and ended on April 25, 1983. Hakusensha released a six-volume aizōban edition between March 3, 1987, and April 29, 1987, and a twelve-volume bunkoban edition between March 23, 1995, and June 21, 1995. The last reprint was done by Media Factory, who published twelve collected volumes between August 23, 2004, and July 23, 2005.

During their panel at Otakon 2026, KiraKira Media announced that they had licensed the series for English publication and will add it to their Omoi app.

==== Spin-offs ====
Wada published two Sukeban Deka short stories set in a parallel universe in the October 1998 and May 1999 issues of Hakusensha's Melody magazine. He published two more installments in the March and April 2003 issues of Media Factory's Monthly Comic Flapper magazine. Media Factory later collected the chapters in a tankōbon volume titled Sukeban Deka If (スケバン刑事if), which they published under the MF Comics imprint on June 23, 2004.

In 2021, almost a decade after Wada's death, Akita Shoten launched three spin-off manga series in Monthly Princess magazine. The first, Toki o Kakeru Sukeban Deka (時をかけるスケバン刑事, lit. "The Delinquent Girl Detective Who Leapt Through Time"), is written and illustrated by Saori Muronaga. It was serialized from the February 2021 issue of Monthly Princess on January 6, 2021, to the July 2023 issue on June 6, 2023. The second, Re: Sukeban Deka (Re:スケバン刑事), is written and illustrated by Ashibi Fukui. It was serialized from the March 2021 issue of the magazine on February 5, 2021, to the August 2025 issue on July 4, 2025. The third, Sukeban Deka Pretend (スケバン刑事 Pretend), is written by Sai Ihara and illustrated by Shingi Hosokawa. It was serialized from the September 2021 issue of Monthly Princess on August 6, 2021, to the April 2024 issue on March 6, 2024.

=== Television series ===
The television series, though technically one series made up of three seasons, are essentially self-contained and separate, aside from sharing the same basic themes and premise, and starring popular Japanese idol singers in the main roles, each one replacing the previous as the new Saki Asamiya, taking on her cover identity and yo-yo weapon.

Sukeban Deka, the first series from 1985, starred Yuki Saito as the titular character Saki Asamiya. Saito's own song "Shiroi Honō" was used as the theme song. Actress Yasuko Endō played Ayumi Mizuchi. Lasting 24 episodes, the series adapted the first part of the manga and was relatively faithful to it, only changing minor points, though it deviated more towards its conclusion. Unlike the manga, where Saki died at the end of a late arc unrelated to the Mizuchi sisters, the series produced an early ending in which Saki seemingly died in a burning building along with her enemy Remi Mizuchi.

The popularity of the first series allowed it to be followed up by Sukeban Deka II: The Legend of the Girl In The Iron Mask (スケバン刑事II 少女鉄仮面伝説) in November 1985. This sequel starred Yoko Minamino, as Saito chose not to return in order to focus on her singing career. In accordance, although the series did base most of its storylines in the second part of the manga, Minamino portrayed an original character named Yoko Godai, a mysterious girl from Kansai forced to wear iron masks for most of her childhood. Yoko was liberated from the mask by a police agent named Nishiwaki (Keizo Kanie) that offered her a place in the Sukeban Deka program, and she accepted in exchange for help to find her disappeared dad. In the process, Yoko would be given the name of her presumably dead predecessor, Saki Asamiya, and a similar yo-yo weapon.

Sukeban Deka II contained connections to the first series, as Hiroyuki Nagato returned periodically to his role as the Dark Director, while Nishiwaki was revealed to be a former coworker of Kyoichiro Jin. However, in a departure from both the first series and manga, where Saki worked alone most of the time, Sukeban Deka II added two sidekicks for the main character: Yukino Yajima (Akie Yoshizawa), the refined heiress of a rich family from Kyoto who was also a Japanese martial arts expert, and Kyoko "Marble Okyo" Nakamura (Haruko Sagara), a street-wise Osaka native who excelled at street fighting and the usage of marbles as weapons. Despite those changes, the series actually surpassed the first in popularity, lasting 42 episodes and bringing the possibility of a third installment.

After the closure of the second season, Toei conceived an independent spin-off named Sukeban Ninpocho (スケバン忍法帖) to air before Sukeban Deka III. It would be based around ninjas, taking inspiration from Sho Kosugi's ninja cinema and Shinji Wada's own manga Ninja Flight, as well as from Star Wars. However, early into production it was decided to merge both Ninpocho and III into a single series. The result was the official third season, Sukeban Deka III: Ninja Girl Romance (スケバン刑事III 少女忍法帖伝奇). Launched in October 1986, it starred Yui Asaka as another original character after Minamino declined to return. Yui Kazama, a country girl from Kyushu who was recruited by the Dark Director and given the role of the third Saki Asamiya.

In the story, Yui, the youngest of the Kazama sisters and known as the Great Sukeban in Miyazaki, was sent to Tokyo by her foster parent, the monk Osho Taian (Hiroyuki Tanaka). She joined her long lost sisters, Yuka (Yuka Onishi) and Yuma (Yuma Nakamura), at Seiryu Academy and together, they inherited the family's ninja art. Their mission was to confront Koji Kashin, a mysterious entity who had been lurking in the shadows for centuries, intending to shroud and dominate the world in darkness. Transformed into a trio of kunoichi, they battled Koji Kashin and his army, aided by their mentor Kazuya Yoda (Nagare Hagiwara) and the agent Reia Kido (Satomi Fukunaga). Towards the end of the story, it is revealed that Yui has a twin sister named Sho, who was taken by Koji Kashin and given psychic abilities. Sho was cursed to stop growing physically at the age of 10 and initially opposed Yui but later learned of their kinship. Yui herself rarely used the Saki Asamiya moniker and showed a very different personality compared to Saki and Yoko, and the series was more focused on fantasy than serious urban crime drama.

Despite a strong premiere and an ambitious length of 42 episodes scheduled in advance, Sukeban Deka III rapidly lost its momentum and didn't do well. During its airing the first feature movie of the franchise was released, Sukeban Deka The Movie, which acted as a crossover between II and III (it also starred Ayako Kobayashi, the winner of a national audition grand prix), but it didn't help the franchise to recover its success. Ninja Girl Romance had its last episode in October 1987, and it was only followed by the feature film Sukeban Deka the Movie 2: Counter-Attack from the Kazama Sisters, which featured the characters in a more traditional plot and gave conclusion to their series.

=== Feature films ===
Two feature films of the TV series were made, followed by a sequel 18 years later.

- Sukeban Deka The Movie was released in 1987 during the release of Sukeban Deka III. Although it featured characters from both the second and third seasons, starring Yoko Minamino and Yui Asaka, the movie was more of a sequel to Sukeban Deka II.
- Sukeban Deka the Movie 2: Counter-Attack from the Kazama Sisters (1988). The movie starred Yui Asaka and served as the third series's finale.
- Sukeban Deka: Code Name = Asamiya Saki, was released in 2006. It was directed by Kenta Fukasaku and starred Aya Matsuura as the new Saki. Her fellow Hello! Project members Rika Ishikawa, Erika Miyoshi and Yui Okada from Biyuden, and Masae Ōtani from Melon Kinenbi also starred in the movie. Hiroyuki Nagato and Yuki Saito from the original Sukeban Deka TV series made special appearances, implying she was the original Saki Asamiya. Out of all three movies, this title is most known and is more accessible, due to it being released on DVD in the U.S. by Magnolia, and in the UK by 4Digital Asia. For its American and UK distribution, the movie was retitled Yo-Yo Girl Cop.

=== Original video animation ===
Released in 1991, the original video animation (OVA) follows closely the events of the first volumes of the manga. It is drawn in the style of the manga, particularly the character designs. One such example is the style of the Mizuchi sisters' eyes, an example being Reimi Mizuchi, whose eyes would often shift to show off a more villainous appearance, or would narrow like a snake's.

Saki Asamiya is given a chance to delay her mother's execution by working as an undercover cop and infiltrating Takanoha High School to investigate some mysterious deaths among the student body. Once there, she comes face-to-face with the powerful Mizuchi sisters, who moved in and have taken control after her previous expulsion.

=== Video games ===
Two games based on the TV series were made at the time: Sukeban Deka II, developed and published in 1987 by Sega for the Master System, and Sukeban Deka III, developed by Shouei System and published by Toei Animation in 1988 for the Famicom. Both were only released in Japan.

== Reception ==
The original manga has been described as a "massively popular gang girl series", and has sold over 20 million copies in Japan. Erica Friedman of Yuricon classified it as "one of the three classic girl-gang series" along with Hana no Asuka-gumi! and Yajikita Gakuen Dōchūki. Moreover, Friedman said Sukeban Deka influenced both and is "the origin of the whole girl-gang madness that filled the 1980s". She also stated the series paved the way for series such as Revolutionary Girl Utena and PreCure. The series' popularity has proven to be longstanding as the TV drama's DVD rerelease sold 130,000 copies in 2005, which prompted Toei to produce the third live-action film. By 2013, it still had impact on popular culture with the TV drama ending inspiring the anime ending of Kill la Kill.

Regarding the content, Friedman commented on the atypical level of violence and sex for a shōjo manga. She also noted the mix of shōnen and shōjo art style, and concluded that it is a shōjo that can appeal for the shōnen public. Carlos Ross, writing about the OVA for THEM Anime Reviews, stated that Sukeban Deka "is Asian action drama faithfully translated into the cel medium, and done well, to boot." Chris Beveridge, writing for Mania Entertainment, felt the OVA was "a middle of the road release". Helen McCarthy in 500 Essential Anime Movies states that the characters "are nicely drawn", the blossoming relationship between Saki and Sanpei "is handled convincingly", and that "teenagers will relate to the story's themes of betrayal, powerlessness, and being an outsider". Jonathan Clements and Helen McCarthy's The Anime Encyclopedia description of the series said it had an "essential silliness", although it is an "entertaining one-joke knockabout".
