= Yuka Onishi =

Japanese actress

Yuka Onishi or Ohnishi (大西結花, Ōnishi Yuka, born July 6, 1968, in Toyonaka-shi, Osaka prefecture, Japan) is a Japanese actress and idol singer in the 1980s, notable in the west for her role in the TV series Sukeban Deka III in 1987 and its following movies, Sukeban Deka: The Movie and Sukeban Deka II.

== Discography ==
=== Albums ===
- 1986.07.01 : Abunai Tightrope
- 1987.08.31 : Take a Chance - Summer Bright
- 1988.03.25 : Le reve
- 1988.11.25 : Peppermint Mocha
- 1989.05.25 : Bridge
- 1989.10.25 : Resistance
- 1991.07.25 : One Way Call
- 2002.07.30 : Reshipi ("recipe", mini-album)

Compilations

- 1987.03.25 : Shadow Hunter - Yuka Collection
- 1987.04.25 : Shadow Hunter - Yuka File #1 (with new songs)
- 1987.12.21 : Greetings From the Big West - Yuka File #2 (mini-album with new songs)
- 1988.07.01 : Memory - Onishi Yuka Best
- 1988.10.25 : Summer Concert '88 Le reve de l'ete (live)
- 1989.06.25 : Best of Best
- 2004.12.22 : Golden Best

=== Singles ===
- 1985.02.25 : Arabesque Romanesque
- 1985.07.25 : Hankoki
- 1985.12.10 : Yasashikute Kanashikute
- 1986.05.25 : Abunai Tightrope
- 1987.02.25 : Shadow Hunter
- 1987.06.25 : Chance wa Ichido dake
- 1987.09.23 : Kanashimi no Shangrila
- 1988.02.10 : Mimosa no Kiseki
- 1988.06.08 : Nagisa Toori no Discotech
- 1988.10.25 : Tulip no Tsubomi
- 1989.04.25 : Suki ni shite...
- 1989.09.25 : Midnight TV
- 1991.07.25 : Gozen Niji no SA-YO-NA-RA
- 1993.01.21 : Hoshizora no Shita de
- 1998.06.20 : Fly Away

== Filmography ==
- Typhoon Club (1985)

(to add)
