= Bakayaro! I'm Plenty Mad =

- Theatrical release poster
- バカヤロー! 私、怒ってます
- Directed by: Eriko Watanabe; Tetsuya Nakashima; Takahito Hara; Yukihiko Tsutsumi
- Written by: Yoshimitsu Morita
- Starring: Narumi Yasuda; Haruko Sagara
- Edited by: Isao Tomita
- Music by: Masanori Sasaji
- Release date: October 15, 1988 (Japan)
- Running time: 94 minutes
- Country: Japan
- Language: Japanese

Bakayaro! I'm Plenty Mad (Japanese: バカヤロー! 私、怒ってます) is a 1988 episodic Japanese film directed by Eriko Watanabe, Tetsuya Nakashima, Takahito Hara and Yukihiko Tsutsumi.

== Awards and nominations ==
13th Hochi Film Award

- Won: Best Actress - Narumi Yasuda
