= Sukeban Deka the Movie 2: Counter-Attack from the Kazama Sisters =

- Theatrical poster
- Directed by: Hideo Tanaka
- Screenplay by: Izo Hashimoto
- Based on: Sukeban Deka by Shinji Wada
- Produced by: Masaharu Nakasone; Osamu Tezuka; Asao Tsunoda
- Starring: Yui Asaka; Yuka Onishi; Yuma Nakamura; Kosuke Toyoharu; Masaki Kyomoto
- Music by: Ichirô Nitta
- Production companies: Fuji Television; Toei Company
- Distributed by: Toei Company
- Release date: February 11, 1988 (Japan)
- Running time: 90 minutes
- Country: Japan
- Language: Japanese

Sukeban Deka the Movie 2: Counter-Attack from the Kazama Sisters (Japanese: スケバン刑事 風間三姉妹の逆襲, Hepburn: Sukeban Deka Kazama San Shimai no Gyakushū) is a live action Japanese film that was released in 1988. The is a sequel to the TV series Sukeban Deka III: Shōjo Ninpō-chō Denki, based on the manga series Sukeban Deka which was written and illustrated by Shinji Wada. It stars the TV series's lead Yui Asaka.

The movie was followed by a third, unrelated movie entitled Yo-Yo Girl Cop in the year 2006.

== Synopsis ==
After the events of Sukeban Deka III, the 17-year-old Saki Asamiya III, Yui Kazama, works for the Juvenile Security Bureau, an expansion of the Sukeban Deka project. This organization is led by politician Kuraudo Sekine, who fights juvenile crime in drastic manners that include summary executions, as reflected by his student agents's triple-bladed yo-yo weapons. However, when Sekine's methods become too zealous, Yui refuses to undertake undercover missions for them and quits the bureau.

Yui tries to resume her normal life along with her older sisters Yuka and Yuma, but she eventually returns to action after learning Sekine and his agents are staging terrorist attacks and blaming them on a gang called the Outcast League. After they discover that Sekine's actual goal is to overthrow the Japanese government, the Kazama sisters are forced to team up with the outcasts and their disenchanted leader Kei to stop Sekine.

== Cast ==
- Yui Asaka as Yui Kazama / Sukeban Deka III
- Yuka Onishi as Yuka Kazama
- Yuma Nakamura as Yuma Kazama
- Masaki Kyomoto as Kuraudo Sekine
- Kosuke Toyohara as Kyosuke Bando
- Minako Fujishiro as Tohko Agawa
- Hiroyuki Nagato as Dark Inspector
- Nagare Hagiwara as Kazuya Yoda
- Shinjirō Ehara as Secretary of Justice
- Mamiko Tayama as Kei
- Koji Tanaka as Goro
- Gannosuke Yamamoto as Kaita
- Yosuke Inozaki as Jun
- Takeshi Iwase as Taro
- Kippei Shiina as JSB agent
