= Yui Asaka =

Japanese singer, idol and actress (born 1969)

Yui Asaka 浅香 唯
- Also known as: Yui
- Born: Aki Kawasaki (川崎 亜紀); December 4, 1969 (age 56); Miyazaki, Miyazaki, Japan
- Genres: Idol pop, Pop-rock, Kayōkyoku,
- Occupations: Singer, idol, actresses
- Years active: 1984–
- Labels: Warner Music Japan (1985–1993, 2020–); Merdack (1997–1998)
- Spouse: Takahiro Nishikawa
- Website: http://www.yui-asaka.com/index2.html

Yui Asaka (浅香 唯, Asaka Yui; born December 4, 1969) is a Japanese singer, idol and actress. She debuted with the single "Natsu Shojo" in 1985 under Warner Music Japan, and made her acting debut with the main role in the third series of Sukeban Deka in 1987.

== Biography ==
Yui was born in Miyazaki, Miyazaki, Japan, and attended Nakano High School. In 1984, she was the Grand Prix Winner for a Young Girls Comics Magazine. Yui was featured as the main character of the comic "Shooting Star". A year later, she debuted as a singer with the single Natsu Shoujo. Up until the end of 1986, Asaka enjoyed a moderately successful career as a singer and an idol.

Her fame grew when she starred in the third series of cult TV Show Sukeban Deka in 1987. In 1989, she starred as the heroine in the live movie adaptation of the popular manga Yawara! A Fashionable Judo Girl. Capitalising on this exposure, Asaka started to write her own songs, starting with the single "Self Control".

In 1993, problems arose when her management began limiting her rights concerning her stage name (Yui Asaka). Asaka decided to temporarily withdraw from the limelight and took a break from show business. Her former label Hummingbird was acquired by Warner Music Japan the following year. She returned to the music scene in 1997 as Yui (not to be confused with another Japanese singer called Yui). Soon after, Asaka reconciled with her agency and was allowed to perform under the name "Yui Asaka" once more. Asaka decided to focus on her acting career, frequently appearing in Japanese TV dramas and variety shows (see full discography below).

In 2020, she released her first digital single Light a Shine which was her first new music release in fifteen years. In 2022, music from her idol years was added to the music streaming services.

== Discography ==
As of 2023, Asaka has released 14 original albums, 5 compilation albums, 25 physical singles, 1 digital single and 6 home-video releases.

=== Studio albums ===
List of albums, with selected chart positions
Title	Album details	Peak positions
Title	Album details	JPN Oricon
Crystal Eyes	Released: February 21, 1986; Label: Humming Bird; Warner; Formats: CD, LP, Cassette tape, digital download, streaming	-
Star Lights	Released: February 28, 1987; Label: Humming Bird; Warner; Formats: CD, LP, cassette, digital download, streaming	8
Candid Girl	Released: June 1, 1988; Label: Humming Bird; Warner; Formats: CD, LP, cassette, digital download, streaming	3
Herstory	Released: December 1, 1988; Label: Humming Bird; Warner; Formats: CD, LP, cassette, digital download, streaming	3
Melody Fair	Released: March 1, 1989; Label: Humming Bird; Warner; Formats: CD, LP, cassette, digital download	2
Pride	Released: November 11, 1989; Label: Humming Bird; Warner; Formats: CD, cassette, digital download, streaming	7
Nude Songs	Released: February 28, 1990; Label: Humming Bird; Warner; Formats: CD, cassette, digital download, streaming	4
Open Your Eyes: Nude Songs Vol.2	Released: July 4, 1990; Label: Humming Bird; Warner; Formats: CD, cassette, digital download, streaming	10
No Lookin' Back	Released: December 5, 1990; Label: Humming Bird; Warner; Formats: CD, cassette, digital download, streaming	10
Glass no Miyako	Released: August 21, 1991; Label: Humming Bird; Warner; Formats: CD, cassette, digital download	23
Stay	Released: February 26, 1992; Label: Humming Bird; Warner; Formats: CD, cassette, digital download, streaming	28
Joker	Released: August 21, 1992; Label: Humming Bird; Warner; Formats: CD, cassette, digital download, streaming	47
Contrast	Released: February 24, 1993; Label: Humming Bird; Warner; Formats: CD, digital download, streaming	63
"—" denotes items which did not chart.

=== Compilation albums ===
List of albums, with selected chart positions
Title	Album details	Peak positions
Title	Album details	JPN Oricon
Present	Released: December 1, 1987; Label: Humming Bird; Warner; Formats: CD, LP, Cassette tape, digital download, streaming	4
Thanks a lot	Released: February 27, 1991; Label: Humming Bird; Warner; Formats: CD, Cassette tape, digital download, streaming	18
Single Collection	Released: November 25, 1992; Label: Humming Bird; Warner; Formats: CD, digital download, streaming	69
Asaka Yui Daizenshou	Released: November 25, 1992; Label: Warner; Formats: CD, digital download, streaming	-
Crystals: 25th Anniversary Best	Released: November 25, 1992; Label: Warner; Formats: CD, digital download, streaming	236
"—" denotes items which did not chart.

=== Live albums ===
List of albums, with selected chart positions
Title	Album details	Peak positions
Title	Album details	JPN Oricon
Anniversary 2824	Released: December 1, 1993; Label: Humming Bird; Warner; Formats: CD, LP, Cassette tape, digital download, streaming	-
1989.8.23 Yui Asaka Special Live in Osaka	Released: June 21, 2022; Label: Warner; Formats: digital download, streaming	-
"—" denotes items which did not chart.

=== Singles ===
List of singles, with selected chart positions
Year	Single	Peak chart positions	Formats
Year	Single	JPN Physical	Formats
1985	"Natsu Shoujo" （夏少女）	120	CD, LP, Cassette, digital download, streaming
1985	"Futari no Moon River" （ふたりのMoon River）	105	CD, LP, Cassette, digital download, streaming
1986	"Yappashi...H!" （ヤッパシ...H!）	111	CD, LP, Cassette, digital download, streaming
1986	"Complex Banzai!!" （コンプレックスBanzai!!）	121	CD, LP, Cassette, digital download, streaming
1986	"10gatsu no Christmas" （10月のクリスマス）	88	CD, LP, Cassette, digital download, streaming
1987	"Star"	9	CD, LP, Cassette, digital download, streaming
1987	"Hitomi ni Storm" （瞳にStorm）	4	CD, LP, Cassette, digital download, streaming
1987	"Niji no Dreamer" （虹のDreamer）	1	CD, LP, Cassette, digital download, streaming
1987	"Remember" （with Onishi Yuka and Nakamura Yuma)	1	CD, LP, Cassette, digital download, streaming
1988	"Believe Again"	2	CD, LP, Cassette, digital download, streaming
1988	"C-Girl"	1	CD, LP, Cassette, digital download, streaming
1988	"Cecile" （セシル）	1	CD, LP, Cassette, digital download, streaming
1988	"Melody"	2	CD, LP, Cassette, digital download, streaming
1989	"True Love"	1	CD, LP, Cassette, digital download, streaming
1989	"Neverland ~ Yawara! Main Theme" （Neverland～Yawara!メインテーマ～）	2	CD, Cassette, digital download, streaming
1989	"Koi no Rock n' Roll Circus" （恋のロックンロール・サーカス）	4	CD, Cassette, digital download, streaming
1989	"Dream Power"	3	CD, Cassette, digital download, streaming
1990	"Chance!"	7	CD, Cassette, digital download, streaming
1990	"Boyfriend wo Tsukurou" （ボーイフレンドをつくろう）	10	CD, Cassette, digital download, streaming
1990	"Self Control"	13	CD, Cassette, digital download, streaming
1991	"Koi no Upside-Dow" （恋のUpside-Down）	32	CD, Cassette, digital download, streaming
1992	"Itoshii Hito to Nemuritai" （愛しい人と眠りたい）	42	CD, digital download, streaming
1993	"Hitori" （ひとり）	-	CD, digital download, streaming
1997	"Ring Ring Ring"	129	CD
1998	"Bukiyou na Tenshi" （器用な天使）	-	CD
2005	"Egao no Watashi" （笑顔の私）	196	CD
"—" denotes items which did not chart

=== Digital single ===
Year	Single	Reference
2021	"Light a Shine: Tsuki Wa Zutto Miteiru"	

=== Home video ===
List of home-video releases, with selected chart positions
Title	Album details	Peak positions
Title	Album details	JPN Oricon
Only Yui	Released: July 3, 1987; Label: Warner; Formats: VHS, LD, DVD	-
Candid Girl	Released: July 1, 1988; Label: Warner; Formats: VHS, LD, DVD	-
Fun!Fan!Fun! Yui Graffiti	Released: January 1, 1989; Label: Warner; Formats: VHS, LD	-
Rock n' Roll Circus'89 Asaka Yui Sparkling Live	Released: December 16, 1989; Label: Warner; Formats: VHS, LD, DVD	-
Self Control	Released: November 18, 1990; Label: Warner; Formats: VHS, LD	-
Yui Asaka Live 2020: Happy Birthday 35th Anniversary	Released: November 18, 1990; Label: Warner; Formats: Blu-ray	-
"—" denotes items which did not chart

== Filmography ==
=== Dramas ===
- 1985: Ikkyuusan
- 1987: Sukeban Deka III: Shoujo Ninpou Chou Denki
- 1988: Kanou Juuban Shoubu!
- 1990: AD Boogie
- 1991: Yo ni mo Kimyou na Monogatari
- 1992: Saimon Selection
- 1992: Nani mo Ienakute
- 1999: Yo ni mo Kimyou na Monogatari '99 Aki no Tokubetsuhen "Wafuku no Shoujo"
- 2000: Tadaima Manshitsu
- 2000: Quiz
- 2000: Kyoto Gion Irimuko Keijijikenbo 6
- 2001: Handoc!!!
- 2002: Kamaitachi no Yoru
- 2003: Satsujin Roke
- 2004: Rikon Yoteibi
- 2005: Mama! I Love You
- 2006: Virus Panic 2006 Natsu -Machi wa Kansenshita-
- 2011: Taira no Kiyomori

=== Films ===
- 1987: Sukeban Deka: The Movie
- 1988: Sukeban Deka: Kazama San Shimai no Gyakushū
- 1989: YAWARA!
- 2001: Dosaken Mahjong Jigoku
- 2010: Kurosawa Eiga
