= Shinji Wada =

Japanese manga artist (1950–2011)

- 和田 慎二
- Born: 岩本 良文 (Yoshifumi Iwamoto); April 19, 1950; Kure, Hiroshima, Japan
- Died: July 5, 2011 (aged 61)
- Known for: Manga

Shinji Wada (和田 慎二, Wada Shinji; April 19, 1950 – July 5, 2011) was a Japanese manga artist in Kure, Hiroshima Prefecture, Japan, and best known for the creation of the Sukeban Deka franchise in 1979.

== History ==
When Hakusensha published Sukeban Deka in 1979, Wada's work became very popular. He was commissioned to create the OAV series and a TV series that spawned three seasons, including two live-action movies.

As of 2007, he had been involved in creating his latest manga Crown. He was previously involved in creating Sukeban Deka: Codename = Asamiya Saki. Wada died in July 2011 due to ischaemic heart disease.

== Works ==
=== Manga ===
Author and artist unless otherwise noted.

- Ai to Shi no Sunadokei (1971-1973, Bessatsu Margaret, Shueisha)
- Waga Tomo Frankenstein (1972-1975, Bessatsu Margaret, Shueisha)
- Gin'iro no Kami no Arisa (1973, Bessatsu Margaret, Shueisha)
- Daitōbō (1974, Bessatsu Margaret, Shueisha)
- Hidari no Me no Akuryō (1975, Hana to Yume, Hakusensha)
- Midori Iro no Sunadokei (1975, Monthly Comics Mimi, Kodansha)
- Vanilla Essence no Gogo (1975, Hana to Yume, Hakusensha)
- Chōshōjo Asuka (1975-2000, Margaret (Shueisha), Hana to Yume (Hakusensha), and Comic Flapper (Media Factory))
- Arabian Kyōsōkyoku (1976, Princess, Akita Shoten)
- Kuma-san no Shiki (1976, Bessatsu Margaret, Shueisha)
- Sukeban Deka (1976-1982, Hana to Yume, Hakusensha)
- Asagi Iro no Densetsu (1976-1990, LaLa and Hana to Yume, Hakusensha)
- Ramu-chan no Sensō (1978, Princess, Akita Shoten)
- Pygmalio (1978-1990, Hana to Yume, Hakusensha)
- Kyōfu no Fukkatsu (1980, Princess, Akita Shoten)
- Ninja Hishō (1980-2002, Hana to Yume (Hakusensha), Monthly ComiComi (Hakusensha), Duo, Comic Flapper (Media Factory))
- Cabbage Batake o Tōri Nukete (1982, Petit Apple Pie, Tokuma Shoten)
- Kaitō Amaryllis (1991-1995, Hana to Yume, Hakusensha)
- Shōjozame (1996-1999, Hana to Yume, Hakusensha)
- Lady Midnight (2001-2002, Mystery Bonita, Akita Shoten)
- Kugutsushi Rin (2006-current, The Puppet Master Rin, Akita Shoten)

=== Collaborative manga ===
- Kami ni Se o Muketa Otoko (1992–1994, art by Shōko Hamada, Serie Mystery, Hakusensha)
- White Dragon (1997–1998, art by Yū Kinutani, Comic Nora, Gakken)
- Blaze (1999–2000, art by Sakaki Hashimoto, Mystery Bonita, Akita Shoten)
- Crown (2005–2008, art by You Higuri, Princess, Akita Shoten)
- Norowareta Kotō

=== Anime ===
- Crusher Joe (OAV, special guest designer on Goby)
- Pygmalio (original creator)

=== TV ===
- Sukeban Deka (OAV, original creator)
- Sukeban Deka (series 1–3, original creator)
- Sukeban Deka (movie, original creator)
- Sukeban Deka: Kazama Sanshimai no Gyakushuu (original creator)
- Sukeban Deka: Codename = Asamiya Saki (original creator)
