= Hideo Tanaka (director) =

Japanese film director (1933–2011)

Hideo Tanaka (田中秀夫, Tanaka Hideo; 24 November 1933 – 9 July 2011) was a Japanese filmmaker, actor, and screenwriter. He is known for his work in several adaptations of Shinji Wada's manga series Sukeban Deka as well as television series and movies from the Metal Hero Series. Tanaka died of stomach cancer on July 9, 2011.

== Film ==
- Ojoosama deka (Gal the Cop) (1990), Direct-to-video
- Sukeban Deka: Kazama Sanshimai no Gyakushuu (1988), aka Girl Gang Boss Detective: Revenge of the Three Kazama Sisters (Japanese informal title) or Sukebandeka the Movie 2: Counter-Attack from the Kazama Sisters (USA: DVD box title)
- Sukeban Deka (1987), aka High School Superheroine (Japan: English title)

== TV ==
- Hana no Asuka gumi (1988), aka Radiant Asuka Class, 10 episodes
- Sukeban Deka III: Shôjo ninpô-chô denki: Sanshimai Mottomo Kiken na Tabi: Yattsu no Shi no Wana (1987), TV Special
- Space Sheriff Shaider (1984-1985), 13 episodes
- Space Sheriff Sharivan (1983-1984), 23 episodes
- Uchuu Keiji Gavan (1982), aka Space Sheriff Gavan, 15 episodes
- Spider-Man (1978), 2 episodes
- Ganbare! Red Vickies (1978, with Hiroko Hayashi), 13 episodes
- Kaiketsu Zubat (1977), aka Swift Hero Zubat and Vigilante Zubat (literal English title), 17 episodes
- Ninja kyaputaa (1976), aka Ninja Captor (literal English title), 17 episodes
