= Haruko Sagara =

Japanese actress and singer (born 1968)

- Born: March 1, 1968 (age 58); Kōriyama, Fukushima, Japan
- Occupation: Actress
- Years active: 1985–2002

Haruko Sagara (相楽 晴子, Sagara Haruko; born March 1, 1968, in Koriyama, Fukushima, Japan) is a Japanese actress and ex-idol singer in the 1980s.

She debuted in 1985 with her role as Okyo in the cult TV series Sukeban Deka II. She won the Award for Best Supporting Actress at the 11th Yokohama Film Festival for Dotsuitarunen. After some 10 movies, 20 TV series, 10 singles and 2 albums, she quit her career in 1995 to settle in Los Angeles, where she married an American, becoming Haruka Haynes. In 2008, she opened a travel agency in Hawaii.

== Filmography ==
- 1985-1986 : Sukeban Deka II : Shōjo Tekkamen Densetsu (TV series) : 'Okyō' / Kyōko Nakamura
- 1986 : Koisuru Onnatachi : Teiko Shima
- 1987 : Sukeban Deka The Movie : 'Okyō' / Kyōko Nakamura
- 1987 : Ariesu no Otome-tachi (TV series) : Keiko Tsugawa
- 1987 : Hissatsu 4: Urami harashimasu : Omitsu
- 1988 : Marilyn ni aitai : Rie (cameo)
- 1988 : Hana no Asuka-gumi! (TV series) : Yoko (Episode 12)
- 1988 : Bakayaro! I'm Plenty Mad : Shizuka Atsugi (Episode 1)
- 1989 : Dotsuitarunen : Takako Kamoi
- 1989 : Harasu no ita hibi
- 1989 : Godzilla vs. Biollante : TV reporter
- 1990 : Yonimo kimyō na monogatari (TV series)
- 1990 : Maria no ibukuro : Shoko
- 1990 : Ruten no umi : Naoko
- 1990 : Saraba itoshino yakuza : Kimiko Takanashi
- 1991 : Kinyoubi no shokutaku (TV movie)
- 1991 : Shin dosei jidai : Miyako Morino
- 1991 : AD Bugi (TV series) : Naoko Kōsaka
- 1993 : If: Moshimo (TV series)
- 1995 : Endless Waltz : Lily
- 2001 : Ashita ga aru sa (TV series)
- 2002 : Ashita ga aru sa: The Movie : Sadayo Hamada (TV movie)

== Discography ==
=== Albums ===
First album

1986/07/01 : Bitter Kiss

Tracks

1. Gozen Reiji no Sandbag (午前SANDBAG)
2. Teenage of Last
3. Odorasete Tonight (踊らせてトゥナイト) (2nd single)
4. Minor Boy (まいなぁBOY)
5. Kiss de Long Goodbye (KissでLong Good-bye)
6. Sutekina Hitomi no Pretender (ステキな瞳のPretender)
7. Virgin Heart (ヴァ－ジン・ハ－ト) (1st single)
8. Funky Monky Town
9. Bitter Kiss o Kimasasete (ビタ－・キッスをきめさせて)
10. Cool Cat to Yobareta (Cool Catと呼ばれた)
11. Bye Bye Game (バイ・バイ・ゲ－ム)

Second album

1990/08/29 : Dainigakushô - Second Movement (第二楽章 ―セカンド・ムーヴメント―)

Tracks

1. Kaze no Invention (風のインヴェンション) (9th single)
2. Aru Ai no Hôkaku (ある愛の報告)
3. Hotel Blanche no Gogo (HOTEL BLANCHEの午後)
4. Hoho ni Soyo Kaze (ほほにそよ風)
5. Sayonara Natsu (さよなら夏)
6. again
7. 24ji no Bride (24時のBRIDE)
8. Rakuen (楽園) (B side from single)
9. Tôi Koibito (遠い恋人)
10. Station yori Ai o Komete (ステイションより愛をこめて)
11. moon-light tears

=== Compilation ===
2005/11/30 : Idol Miracle Bible : Sagara Haruko - Best Tune (アイドルミラクルバイブル 相楽晴子 Best Tune)

Tracks Disc 1

1. Virgin Heart (ヴァ－ジン・ハ－ト) (1st single / from 1st album)
2. Abunai Junction (あぶないジャンクション) (B side from 1st single)
3. Odorasete Tonight (踊らせてトゥナイト) (2nd single / from 1st album)
4. Yappa Onna (ヤッパ・オンナ) (B side from 2nd single)
5. Gozen Reiji no Sandbag (午前SANDBAG) (from 1st album)
6. Teenage of Last (from 1st album)
7. Minor Boy (まいなぁBOY) (from 1st album)
8. Kiss de Long Goodbye (KissでLong Good-bye) (from 1st album)
9. Sutekina Hitomi no Pretender (ステキな瞳のPretender) (from 1st album)
10. Funky Monky Town (from 1st album)
11. Bitter Kiss o Kimasasete (ビタ－・キッスをきめさせて) (from 1st album)
12. Cool Cat to Yobareta (Cool Catと呼ばれた) (from 1st album)
13. Bye Bye Game (バイ・バイ・ゲ－ム) (from 1st album)
14. Seaside Mint Blue (3rd single)
15. 出発つこころに I Need You (出発つこころに I Need You) (B side from 3rd single)
16. Mokuyôbi ni wa Kiss o (木曜日にはKISSを) (4th single)
17. Semi Sweet Shock (セミ・スィート・ショック) (B side from 4th single)
18. Bladerunner (ブレード・ランナー) (5th single)
19. Ushiromuki no Love (うしろむきのLOVE) (B side from 5th single)

Tracks Disc 2

1. Nemureru Nagisa no Season (眠れる渚のSEASON) (6th single)
2. Tokyo Marionette (東京マリオネット) (7th single)
3. Happy End ni Yoroshiku (ハッピーエンドによろしく) (B side from 7th single)
4. Midnight Call (MID-NIGHT CALL) (8th single)
5. ? (惚れてんねん) (B side from 8th single)
6. Kaze no Invention (風のインヴェンション) (9th single / from 2nd album)
7. Rakuen (楽園) (B side from 9th single / from 2nd album)
8. Aru Ai no Hôkaku (ある愛の報告) (from 2nd album)
9. Hotel Blanche no Gogo (HOTEL BLANCHEの午後) (from 2nd album)
10. Hoho ni Soyo Kaze (ほほにそよ風) (from 2nd album)
11. Sayonara Natsu (さよなら夏) (from 2nd album)
12. again (from 2nd album)
13. 24ji no Bride (24時のBRIDE) (from 2nd album)
14. Tôi Koibito (遠い恋人) (from 2nd album)
15. Station yori Ai o Komete (ステイションより愛をこめて) (from 2nd album)
16. moon-light tears (from 2nd album)
17. Senaka (背中) (10th single)

=== Singles ===
1. 1986/05/02 : Virgin Heart
  A - Virgin Heart (ヴァージン・ハート) (from 1st album, Bitter Kiss)
  B - Abunai Junction (あぶないジャンクション)
2. 1986/10/10 : Odorasete Tonight
  A - Odorasete Tonight (踊らせてトゥナイト) (from 1st album, Bitter Kiss)
  B - Yappa Onna (ヤッパ・オンナ)
3. 1987/02/05 : Seaside Mint Blue
  A - Seaside Mint Blue
  B - 出発つこころに I Need You (出発つこころに I Need You)
4. 1987/05/21 : Mokuyôbi ni wa Kiss o
  A - Mokuyôbi ni wa Kiss o (木曜日にはKISSを)
  B - Semi Sweet Shock (セミ・スィート・ショック)
5. 1988/02/26 : Bladerunner
  A - Bladerunner (ブレード・ランナー)
  B - Ushiromuki no Love (うしろむきのLOVE)
6. 1988/09/01 : Nemureru Nagisa no Season
  A - Nemureru Nagisa no Season (眠れる渚のSEASON)
  B - Herb Rain o Mô Sukoshi (ハーブレインをもう少し)
7. 1989/04/19 : Tokyo Marionette
  A - Tokyo Marionette (東京マリオネット)
  B - Happy End ni Yoroshiku (ハッピーエンドによろしく)
8. 1989/11/15 : Midnight Call
  A - Midnight Call (MID-NIGHT CALL)
  B - ? (惚れてんねん)
9. 1990/07/25 : Kaze no Invention
  A - Kaze no Invention (風のインヴェンション) (from 2nd album, Dainigakushô - Second Movement)
  B - Rakuen (楽園) (from 2nd album, Dainigakushô - Second Movement)
10. 1994/11/02 : Senaka
  A - Senaka (背中)
  B - Senaka (original karaoke) (背中（オリジナルカラオケ）)
