= Best (Akina Nakamori album) =

Greatest hits album by Akina Nakamori
- Released: April 1, 1986
- Recorded: 1982–1985
- Genres: J-pop; kayōkyoku; pop rock
- Length: 52:48
- Language: Japanese
- Label: Warner Pioneer

Akina Nakamori chronology
D404ME (1985)	Best (1986)	Fushigi (1986)

Singles from Best
- 1. "Sand Beige (Sabaku e)" Released: 19 June 1985; 2. "Solitude" Released: 8 October 1985

Best is the second greatest hits album by Japanese singer Akina Nakamori, released on April 1, 1986, by Warner Pioneer.

== Background ==
It contains all the singles released between 1982 and 1985: from the "Slow Motion" to "Solitude".

The singles "Sand Beige (Sabaku e)" and "Solitude" were recorded in the album for first time. Although "Meu amor é..." was included in the studio album D404ME, the original version was recorded for first time as well.

== Promotion ==
=== Singles ===
"Sand Beige (Sabaku e)" is the twelfth single released on 16 June 1985. It's her second A-side song with the far east rhythm instrumentation. The small part of the refrain performed in the Egyptian dialect. The single debuted at number 1 on Oricon Single Weekly Chart and became the seventh best sold single in 1985. In The Best Ten ranking, it debuted on number 2 and stayed at number 8 in the yearly chart.

It has received three awards: award in the 11th Nihon TV Ongakusai, in the 18th Japan Cable Awards and in the 18th Zennihon Yuusen Housou Taishou.

"Solitude" is the thirteenth single released on 9 October 1985. The single debuted at number 1 on Oricon Single Weekly Chart and became the 35th best sold single in 1985. In The Best Ten ranking, it debuted on number 2 and stayed at number 29 in the yearly chart.

It has received three awards: Yokohama Music Festival Award at the Yokohama Music Festival, Gold Award and Best Singing Award in the Zen Nihon Kayou Ongakusai and Broadcast Music Producer Federation Award in the 16th Japan Music Awards.

== Chart performance ==
The album debuted at number 1 on the Oricon Weekly Album Charts and remained in the same position for three consecutive weeks. LP Record version charted 23 weeks, Cassette tape charted 96 weeks and CD version charted 62 weeks. The album remained at number 6 on the Oricon Album Yearly Charts in 1986. The album totally sold more than 770,000 copies. It won the Grand Prix Album of the Year and the Best Album of the Year – Pop (Solo) at the 1st Japan Gold Disc Awards.

== Track listing ==
No.	Title	Lyrics	Music	Arrangement	Length
1.	"Slow Motion" (スローモーション)	Etsuko Kisugi	Takao Kisugi	Motoki Funayama	4:06
2.	"Second Love" (セカンド・ラブ)	E. Kisugi	T. Kisugi	Mitsuo Hagita	4:22
3.	"Twilight (Yūgure Dayori)" (トワイライト -夕暮れ便り-)	E. Kisugi	T. Kisugi	Hagita	4:40
4.	"Kita Wing" (北ウイング)	Chinfa Kan	Tetsuji Hayashi	Hayashi	4:35
5.	"Southern Wind" (サザン・ウインド)	E. Kisugi	Kōji Tamaki	Ichizō Seo	3:50
6.	"Sand Beige (Sabaku e)" (Sand Beige -砂漠へ-)	Eiko Kyo	Takashi Tsushimi	Akira Inoue	4:37
7.	"Solitude"	Reiko Yukawa	Yukihide Takekawa	Satoshi Nakamura	4:25
8.	"Meu amor é..." (ミ・アモーレ)	Kan	Naoya Matsuoka	Matsuoka	3:52
9.	"Kazari ja Nai no yo Namida wa" (飾りじゃないのよ涙は)	Yōsui Inoue	Y. Inoue	Hagita	4:10
10.	"Jukkai (1984)" (十戒 (1984))	Masao Urino	Masayoshi Takanaka	Hagita; Takanaka	3:35
11.	"Kinku" (禁区)	Urino	Haruomi Hosono	Hagita; Hosono	3:47
12.	"½ no Shinwa" (½の神話)	Urino	Yoshiyuki Ohsawa	Hagita	3:18
13.	"Shōjo A" (少女A)	Urino	Hiroaki Serizawa	Hagita	3:31
Total length:					52:48

2023 remaster reissue
No.	Title	Lyrics	Music	Arrangement	Length
14.	"Tsubaki Juliana" (椿姫ジュリアーナ)	Ikki Matsumoto	Takashi Satou	Akira Inoue	4:02
15.	"Again"	Mai Arai	Arai	Satoshi Nakamura	4:27
Total length:					52:48

== Release history ==
Year	Format(s)	Serial number	Label(s)	Ref.
1986	LP, CT, CD	L-13030, LKG-5030, 32XL-150	Warner Pioneer	
1989	Gold CD	36L2-5104	Warner Pioneer	
1991	CD	WPCL-419	Warner Pioneer	
2006	CD, digital download	WPCL-10285	Warner Pioneer	
2012	Super Audio CD, CD hybrid	WPCL-11143	Warner Pioneer	
2018	LP, CD	WPJL-10092, WPCL-12904	Warner Pioneer	
2020	LP	BRIDGE-307/08	Bridge Inc.	
2023	2CD, 2CD+CT+2LP	WPCL-13472/3, WPZL-32050/4	Warner Pioneer	

Notes:

- 2006 re-release includes 24-bit digitally remastered sound source
- 2012 and 2014 re-release includes subtitles in the tracks "2012 remaster"
- 2022 re-release includes lacquer remaster which includes subtitles in the tracks "2022 lacquer remaster" along with original karaoke version of the tracks

== See also ==
- 1986 in Japanese music
