= Fantasy (Gensoukyoku) =

Studio album by Akina Nakamori
- Released: 23 March 1983
- Recorded: 1982–1983
- Genre: Idol Kayokyoku
- Length: 38:24
- Language: Japanese
- Label: Warner Pioneer
- Producer: Misako Nohara

Akina Nakamori chronology
Variation (Hensoukyoku) (1982)	Fantasy (Gensoukyoku) (1983)	New Akina Etranger (1984)

Singles from Fantasy (Gensoukyoku)
- 1. "Second Love" Released: 10 November 1983

Fantasy (Gensoukyoku) is the third studio album by Japanese singer Akina Nakamori. It was released on 23 March 1983 under the Warner Pioneer label. The album includes the hit single "Second Love".

== Background ==
Fantasy (Gensoukyoku) is the first studio album released in 1983.

The music production team consisted of a main arranger, Mitsuo Hagita, Akira Ootsu, Kisugi siblings Etsuko and Takao, Shizuka Ijūin, Masao Urino, Hiroaki Serizawa and Toshiyuki Kimori.

"Akina Kara" is a recorded speech message from Nakamori herself with background music.

== Promotion ==
=== Single ===
The album consists of one promotional single, "Second Love". The single achieved the biggest success along with its previous release, "Shoujo A", in her debut year. The single debuted at number 1 on the Oricon Single Weekly Chart and remained on the yearly chart at number 8. In The Best Ten Rankings, the single debuted at number 1 and remained in the 1982 yearly chart at number 62 and the 1983 yearly chart at number 33. The single received a reward for its composition in the Composition Awards and an Excellent Star Award from the National Cable Broadcasting Awards.

=== Music home video ===
On 1 May 1985, the second music home video Hajimemashita Nakamori Akina was released. This was Nakamori's third debut anniversary. The music video clips were filmed in United States, mainly in Los Angeles and Santa Monica. The filming of the music home video began before her debut, between 11 and 17 March 1982. From the original Fantasy album, was recorded only "Second Love".

== Stage performances ==
Akina performs "Second Love" in her live tours very often and considered to be one of her personal favorite songs.

Most of the songs were performed in the live tour Milky Way in 1983, such as "Ruriiro no Yoru he", "Nigiwai no Kisetsu he", "Kizudarake no Love" and "Aitsu wa Joke".

"Aventure" and "More Motto Koishite" were performed in the live tour Rainbow Shower in 1983.

"Me wo Tojite Excursion" was performed in the live Rainbow Shower in 1983 and Yume 91 Akina Nakamori Special Live in 1991.

== Chart performance ==
The album reached number one on the Oricon Album Weekly Chart for four consecutive weeks, charted 26 weeks and sold over 615,700 copies. The album was ranked at number 4 on the Oricon Album Yearly Chart in 1983.

== Track listing ==
All tracks arranged by Mitsuo Hagita.

No.	Title	Lyrics	Music	Length
1.	"Akina Kara..." (明菜から……。)		Hagita	2:17
2.	"Ruriiro no Yoru e" (瑠璃色の夜へ)	Etsuko Kisugi	Juichi Sase	3:40
3.	"Aventure" (アバンチュール Abanchuuru)	Maiko Okazaki	Kazumi Mori	4:16
4.	"Nigiwai no Kisetsu e" (にぎわいの季節へ)	Akira Ootsu	Toshiyuki Kimori	4:09
5.	"Kizudarake no Love" (傷だらけのラブ Kizudarake no Rabu)	Shizuka Ijūin	Fujimaru Yoshino	3:32
6.	"Me wo Tojite (Excursion)" (目をとじて小旅行（イクスカーション） Me wo Tojite Shouryokou (Ikusukaashon))	Mayumi Shinozuka	Yasuhiko Shigemura	4:36
7.	"Second Love" (セカンド・ラブ Sekando Rabu)	E. Kisugi	T. Kisugi	4:26
8.	"Shishunki" (思春期)	Masao Urino	Hiroaki Serizawa	3:56
9.	"More Motto Koishite" (Moreもっと恋して)	Ayumi Date	Yoshihiro Yonekura	4:05
10.	"Aitsu wa Joke" (アイツはジョーク Aitsu wa Jooku)	Tsuzuru Nakasato	Kuniko Fukushima	3:27
Total length:				38:24

2022 Remaster Issue
No.	Title	Lyrics	Music	Length
11.	"Kagami no Naka no J" (鏡の中のJ)	Yoshiko Miura	Ken Sato	3:34
Total length:				41:58

== Covers ==
=== Second Love covers ===
- Takao Kisugi self-covered the song on his 1983 album Visitor.
- Hong Kong singer Sara Lee covered the song in Cantonese as "teoi3 bin3" (蛻変, "Metamorphosis") on her 1985 album lei5 lai6 jeoi5 lyun2 kuk1 zaap6 (李麗蕊恋曲集, Sara Lee's Love Songs).
- Yukari Itō covered the song on her 2002 cover album Touch Me Lightly.
- Ai Nonaka (as Minoru Izumi) covered the song on the 2005 cover album Mansuri Moe on Vocal Collection Vol. 1.
- Chiyo covered the song in 2007.
- Mika Suzuki covered the song on the 2007 various artists cover album 80's Hit Parade.
- Colega Bossa Club covered the song on their 2008 album Futokoro Mellow J Bossa Winter Lounge.
- Risa covered the song in 2008.
- Junichi Inagaki and Yu-ki covered the song on Inagaki's 2008 cover album Otoko to Onna: Two Hearts Two Voices.
- Julee Karan covered the song on her 2011 cover album Torch.
- Yoshimi Iwasaki covered the song on her 2013 cover album The Reborn Songs: Cyclamen.
- Natsuki Morikawa covered the song on her 2016 cover album J: Sentimental Cover.
- Ayano Kudō covered the song as the B-side of her 2017 single "Koi Goyomi".
- Kim Jae-joong covered the song on his 2020 cover album Love Covers II.

=== Other covers ===
- Hong Kong singer 心泛春潮 covered Ruriiro no Yoru e in Cantonese as "林玉鳳" as part of compilation album Hong Kong district singing contest released in 1984 under Pansonic label.

== Release history ==
Year	Format(s)	Serial number	Label(s)	Ref.
1983	LP, CT, SD, CD	L-12570, LKF-8070, SDM-15007, 35XL-1	Warner Pioneer	
1985	CD	32XL-84	Warner Pioneer	
1991	CD	WPCL-412	Warner Pioneer	
1996	CD	WPC6-8184	Warner Pioneer	
2006	CD, digital download	WPCL-10278	Warner Pioneer	
2012	Super Audio CD, CD hybrid	WPCL-11136	Warner Pioneer	
2014	CD	WPCL-11724	Warner Pioneer	
2018	LP	WPJL-10085	Warner Pioneer	
2022	2CD	WPCL-13414/5	Warner Pioneer	

Notes:

- 2006 re-release includes 24-bit digitally remastered sound source
- 2012 and 2014 re-release includes subtitles in the tracks "2012 remaster"
- 2022 re-release includes lacquer remaster which includes subtitles in the tracks "2022 lacquer remaster" along with original karaoke version of the tracks

== See also ==
- 1983 in Japanese music
