= Meikyo: Tribute to Akina Nakamori =

Compilation album by Various artists
- Released: May 1, 2025
- Recorded: 2025
- Genre: J-pop; kayōkyoku; city pop; pop rock
- Language: Japanese
- Label: Warner Japan

Meikyo: Tribute to Akina Nakamori (中森明菜 Tribute Album "明響", Nakamori Akina Tribute Album "Meikyo") is a tribute album consisting of songs originally performed by Akina Nakamori, released on her debut anniversary on 1 May 2025 by Warner Music Japan. The album contains cover versions of some of Nakamori's hit singles from 1982 to 1988. It is also Nakamori's first official release under WMJ with her approval for the first time since her last single with the label in 1991.

The album peaked at No. 12 on Oricon's Weekly Albums chart.

== Background ==
On 24 February 2025, it was announced that a tribute album will be released to celebrate Nakamori's 43rd anniversary in the music industry. Singers Ado, Juju, Yu Shirota, Kōji Tamaki, Shiori Tamai, Masayuki Suzuki, Yo Hitoto, Mika Nakashima and pop-duo Chemistry provided their own covers. On the same day of the announcement, the participating artists and Nakamori herself published comments regarding their involvement in the album's recording. On 14 March 2025, Gyubin, Toki Asako, East of Eden, and Hoshikuzu Scat were announced to provide covers for the album. On 28 March, the official lineup was announced and cover artwork by Shun Nakao was published.

The album's title Meikyo (明響 (めいきょう)) uses the kanji Akira (明) and Hibiki (響) and is short for "Make Akina Resonate!" (明菜を響かせる！, Akina wo Hibikaseru!) or "Akina Resonates!" (明菜が響く！, Akina ga Hibiku!).

The album was released in two editions: a standard CD edition and a limited 2CD edition, in which the second disc includes remastered versions of the original tracks.

== Promotion ==
Prior to the album's release, a special live event "Akina Nakamori Tribute Concert Meikyo" (中森明菜 Tribute Concert 明響) was held on 1 May 2025 at Line Cube Shibuya, to promote the album. Some of the artists involved in the album also performed on the said concert. The announcement was made on the same day as the album's release.

== Track listing ==
Single CD/Deluxe edition disc 1
No.	Title	Lyrics	Music	Cover artist(s)	Length
1.	"Slow Motion" (スローモーション, Surō Mōshon)	Etsuko Kisugi	Takao Kisugi	Shiori Tamai (Momoiro Clover)	4:02
2.	"Shōjo A" (少女A, "Girl A")	Masao Urino	Hiroaki Serizawa	Yu Shirota	3:33
3.	"Second Love" (セカンド・ラブ, Sekando Rabu)	E. Kisugi	T. Kisugi	Toki Asako	4:44
4.	"Twilight (Yūgure Dayori)" (トワイライト -夕暮れ便り-, Towairaito -Yūgure Dayori-, "Twilight (Twilight News)")	E. Kisugi	T. Kisugi	Gyubin	4:11
5.	"Kita Wing" (北ウイング, Kita Uingu, "North Wing")	Chinfa Kan	Tetsuji Hayashi	Yo Hitoto	4:23
6.	"Southern Wind" (サザン・ウインド, Sazan Uindo)	E. Kisugi	Kōji Tamaki	Kōji Tamaki	4:00
7.	"Jukkai (1984)" (十戒 (1984), Jukkai Ichi Kyū Hachi Yon, "Ten Commandments (1984)")	Urino	Masayoshi Takanaka	Ado	3:34
8.	"Kazari ja Nai no yo Namida wa" (飾りじゃないのよ涙は, "The Tears Are Not a Decoration")	Yōsui Inoue	Inoue	Masayuki Suzuki	5:09
9.	"Meu amor é..." (ミ・アモーレ, Mi Amōre, "My Love is...")	Kan	Naoya Matsuoka	Chemistry	3:57
10.	"Desire (Jōnetsu)" (DESIRE -情熱-)	Yoko Aki	Kisaburō Suzuki	Juju	4:20
11.	"Tango Noir"	Kayoko Fuyumori	Takashi Tsushimi	East of Eden	4:08
12.	"Nanpasen" (難破船, "Shipwreck")	Tokiko Kato	Kato	Mika Nakashima	4:31
13.	"Tattoo" (T-Groove Remix)	Yuri Moriko	Anri Sekine	Hoshikuzu Scat	4:15

Notes

- "Southern Wind" was originally re-recorded in 2024 by Kōji Tamaki on his self-cover album Tamaki Kōji no Ongaku Sekai.
- "Desire" was originally re-recorded in 2023 by Juju on her cover album Snack Juju: Yoru no Request.

Disc 2: Akina Nakamori Best (2025 Remaster)
No.	Title	Lyrics	Music	Arrangement	Length
1.	"Slow Motion"	E. Kisugi	T. Kisugi	Motoki Funayama	4:07
2.	"Shōjo A"	Urino	Serizawa	Mitsuo Hagita	3:33
3.	"Second Love"	E. Kisugi	T. Kisugi	Hagita	4:24
4.	"Twilight (Yūgure Dayori)"	E. Kisugi	T. Kisugi	Hagita	4:42
5.	"Kita Wing"	Kan	Hayashi	Hayashi	4:33
6.	"Southern Wind"	E. Kisugi	Tamaki	Ichizō Seo	3:51
7.	"Jukkai (1984)"	Urino	Takanaka	Takanaka; Hagita	3:36
8.	"Kazari ja Nai no yo Namida wa"	Inoue	Inoue	Hagita	4:10
9.	"Meu amor é..."	Kan	Matsuoka	Matsuoka	3:52
10.	"Desire (Jōnetsu)"	Aki	Suzuki	Kazuo Shiina	4:24
11.	"Tango Noir"	Fuyumori	Tsushimi	Satoshi Nakamura	4:09
12.	"Nanpasen"	Kato	Kato	Kei Wakakusa	4:27
13.	"Tattoo"	Moriko	Sekine	Eurox	3:56

== Release history ==
Year	Format(s)	Serial number	Label(s)	Ref.
2025	CD; CD2	WPCL13648; WPCL13646	Warner Music Japan	

== Charts ==
Weekly charts

Chart (2025)	Peak position
Japanese Albums (Oricon)	12
