= 1983 in Japanese music =

In 1983 (Shōwa 58), Japanese music was released on records and performed in concerts, and there were charts, awards, contests and festivals.

During that year, Japan continued to have the second largest music market in the world, and the value of tapes and records made there was $1.198 billion.

== Awards, contests and festivals ==
The 12th Tokyo Music Festival was held on 27 March 1983. The 25th Osaka International Festival (Japanese: 大阪国際フェスティバル) was held from 8 April to 8 May 1983. The 25th Yamaha Popular Song Contest was held on 15 May 1983. The 26th Yamaha Popular Song Contest was held on 2 October 1983. The 14th World Popular Song Festival was held from 29 to 30 October 1983. The final of the 12th FNS Music Festival was held on 20 December 1983. The 25th Japan Record Awards were held on 31 December 1983. The 34th NHK Kōhaku Uta Gassen was held on 31 December 1983.

The 32nd Otaka prize was won by Toshi Ichiyanagi.

== Concerts ==
Yumi Matsutoya had a concert at the Nippon Budokan on 6 July 1983.

== Number one singles ==
The following reached number 1 on the weekly Oricon Singles Chart:

Issue date	Song	Artist(s)
3 January	"3 Nenme no Uwaki"	Hiroshi & Kibo
10 January	"3 Nenme no Uwaki"	Hiroshi & Kibo
17 January	"Second Love"	Akina Nakamori
24 January	"Second Love"	Akina Nakamori
31 January	"Midnight Station"	Masahiko Kondō
7 February	"Midnight Station"	Masahiko Kondō
14 February	"Himitsu no Hanazono"	Seiko Matsuda
21 February	"Himitsu no Hanazono"	Seiko Matsuda
28 February	"Pierrot"	Toshihiko Tahara
7 March	"½ no Shinwa"	Akina Nakamori
14 March	"½ no Shinwa"	Akina Nakamori
21 March	"½ no Shinwa"	Akina Nakamori
28 March	"½ no Shinwa"	Akina Nakamori
4 April	"½ no Shinwa"	Akina Nakamori
11 April	"½ no Shinwa"	Akina Nakamori
18 April	"Yagiri no Watashi"	Takashi Hosokawa
25 April	"Yagiri no Watashi"	Takashi Hosokawa
2 May	"Yagiri no Watashi"	Takashi Hosokawa
9 May	"Manatsu no Ichibyo"	Masahiko Kondō
16 May	"Tengoku no Kiss"	Seiko Matsuda
23 May	"Megumi no Hito"	Rats & Star
30 May	"Shower na Kibun"	Toshihiko Tahara
6 June	"Tantei Monogatari / Sukoshi Dake Yasashiku"	Hiroko Yakushimaru
13 June	"Tantei Monogatari / Sukoshi Dake Yasashiku"	Hiroko Yakushimaru
20 June	"Tantei Monogatari / Sukoshi Dake Yasashiku"	Hiroko Yakushimaru
27 June	"Tantei Monogatari / Sukoshi Dake Yasashiku"	Hiroko Yakushimaru
4 July	"Tantei Monogatari / Sukoshi Dake Yasashiku"	Hiroko Yakushimaru
11 July	"Tantei Monogatari / Sukoshi Dake Yasashiku"	Hiroko Yakushimaru
18 July	"Tantei Monogatari / Sukoshi Dake Yasashiku"	Hiroko Yakushimaru
25 July	"Tameiki Rockabilly"	Masahiko Kondō
1 August	"Tameiki Rockabilly"	Masahiko Kondō
8 August	"Tameiki Rockabilly"	Masahiko Kondō
15 August	"Glass no Ringo / Sweet Memories"	Seiko Matsuda
22 August	"Saraba... Natsu"	Toshihiko Tahara
29 August	"Saraba... Natsu"	Toshihiko Tahara
5 September	"Flashdance... What a Feeling"; Japanese title: (フラッシュダンス...ホワット・ア・フィーリング)	Irene Cara
12 September	"Flashdance... What a Feeling"; Japanese title: (フラッシュダンス...ホワット・ア・フィーリング)	Irene Cara
19 September	"Kinku"	Akina Nakamori
26 September	"Cat's Eye"	Anri
3 October	"Cat's Eye"	Anri
10 October	"Cat's Eye"	Anri
17 October	"Cat's Eye"	Anri
24 October	"Cat's Eye"	Anri
31 October	"Glass no Ringo / Sweet Memories"	Seiko Matsuda
7 November	"Hitomi wa Diamond / Aoi Photograph"	Seiko Matsuda
14 November	"Royal Straight Flash"	Masahiko Kondō
21 November	"Hitomi wa Diamond / Aoi Photograph"	Seiko Matsuda
28 November	"Loving"	Toshihiko Tahara
5 December	"Loving"	Toshihiko Tahara
12 December	"Loving"	Toshihiko Tahara
19 December	"Love Is Over"	Ouyang Fei Fei
26 December	"Love Is Over"	Ouyang Fei Fei

== Number one albums and LPs ==
Music Labo

The following reached number 1 on the Music Labo chart:

- 10 January and 17 January: Seventeen - Akina Nakamori
- 24 January and 31 January: Variation (Hensoukyoku) - Akina Nakamori
- 7 February and 14 February: Eve Only - Toshihiko Tahara
- 21 February and 28 February: Another Page - Christopher Cross
- 7 March and 14 March: Reincarnation - Yumi Matsutoya
- 21 March: Yokan - Miyuki Nakajima
- 4 April, 11 April, 25 April and 2 May: Fantasy (Gensoukyoku) - Akina Nakamori
- 18 April: Rising - Masahiko Kondō
- 9 May, 16 May and 24 May: No Damage - Motoharu Sano
- 30 May: Momentos - Julio Iglesias
- 6 June: Uwakina Bokura - Yellow Magic Orchestra
- 13 June and 20 June: Utopia - Seiko Matsuda
- 27 June, 4 July and 11 July: Melodies - Tatsuro Yamashita
- 18 July, 25 July, 1 August and 8 August: Kireyi - Southern All Stars
- 15 August, 5 September, 12 September, 19 September, 26 September, 3 October, 10 October, 17 October, 23 October, 30 October and 7 November: Soundtrack of "Flashdance"
- 22 August and 29 August: New Akina Etranger - Akina Nakamori
- 14 November, 21 November: Nemurenai Jidai - Chiharu Matsuyama
- 28 November: Seiko Plazza - Seiko Matsuda
- 5 December: Colour by Numbers - Culture Club
- 12 December and 19 December: Voyager - Yumi Matsutoya
- 26 December: Canary - Seiko Matsuda

Cash Box

The following reached number 1 on the Cash Box of Japan chart:

- 15 January: Kinyiro No Ribon - Seiko Matsuda
- 29 January: Variation (Hensoukyoku) - Akina Nakamori
- 5 March: Shylights - Junichi Inagaki
- 12 March and 19 March: Another Page - Christopher Cross
- 2 April and 9 April: Reincarnation - Yumi Matsutoya
- 7 May: Fantasy (Gensoukyoku) - Akina Nakamori
- 28 May: Vitamin - EPO
- 16 July: Utopia Seiko Matsuda
- 13 August, 20 August and 3 September: Kireyi - Southern All Stars
- 24 September, 29 October, 5 November, 12 November and 10 December: Soundtrack of "Flashdance"
- 17 December: Seiko Plazza - Seiko Matsuda

Oricon

The following reached number 1 on the Oricon LP chart:

- 6 June: Naughty Boys - Yellow Magic Orchestra
- 4 July: Melodies - Tatsuro Yamashita
- 22 August and 29 August: New Akina Etranger - Akina Nakamori

== Annual charts ==
Eisaku Ōkawa's Sazanka No Yado was number 1 in the Oricon annual singles chart.

== Music industry ==
Polydor Japan introduced the uniform coding system.

== Film and television ==
The music of Merry Christmas, Mr. Lawrence, by Ryuichi Sakamoto, won the 38th Mainichi Film Award for Best Music. The music of The Geisha and Kairei (Japanese: 海嶺) and Sensei (all from 1983), by Masaru Sato, won the 7th Japan Academy Film Prize for Best Music (awarded in 1984). Musicals include Toshi in Takarazuka – Love Forever.

== Idols ==
The expression "Fusaku No 83-nen-gumi" (Japanese: 不作の83年組) has been used to described a group of idols who debuted in 1983. "Okami Seven" (Japanese: お神セブン) is a group of idols who debuted in 1983.

== Overseas ==
The song Forbidden Colours, by David Sylvian and Ryuichi Sakamoto, reached number 16 on the UK singles chart, and also charted in Ireland, Australia and Iceland. The single Merry Christmas Mr. Lawrence, by Ryuichi Sakamoto, reached number 93 on the UK singles chart, and also charted in Australia and New Zealand. The album Merry Christmas Mr. Lawrence, by Ryuichi Sakamoto, reached number 36 on the UK albums chart, and also charted in Australia, New Zealand, Sweden, Iceland and the Netherlands.

== Debuts ==
- April: Azumi Inoue released her debut single "Star Storm" (Japanese: スターストーム). The song is included in her first album "Space Fantasy" (Japanese: スペースファンタジー).
- Hiromi Koide

== Other singles released ==
- Twilight (Yūgure Dayori) by Akina Nakamori
- Toki O Kakeru Shōjo by Tomoyo Harada
- Ai No Jidai by Saki Kubota
- Summer Suspicion by S. Kiyotaka & Omega Tribe
- Haru na no ni by Yoshie Kashiwabara
- "O-kay" by Mico
- 23 April: Koukiatsu Girl by Tatsuro Yamashita
- 21 November: Tasogare Dancing by Miki Asakura.

== Other albums released ==
- Service by Yellow Magic Orchestra
- Timely!! by Anri
- Nefertiti by Saki Kubota
- Lunatic Doll and Romantic Night by Mari Hamada
- Photographs and Jive Jive by Casiopea
- The Law of Devil's Land and Live-Loud-Alive: Loudness in Tokyo by Loudness
- Holy Expedition by Bow Wow
- The Water of the Rainbow by T-Square
- Can I Sing? by Masayoshi Takanaka

== See also ==
- Timeline of Japanese music
- 1983 in Japan
- 1983 in music
- w:ja:1983年の音楽
