= Utahime Double Decade =

Compilation album by Akina Nakamori
- Released: December 4, 2002
- Recorded: 2002
- Studio: On-Air Azabu Studio; Victor Studio; Burnish Stone Recording Studio
- Genre: J-pop; jazz; salsa; tango; ska; bossa nova
- Length: 55:55
- Language: Japanese
- Label: Universal Music Japan
- Producer: Akina Nakamori; Satoshi Takebe

Akina Nakamori chronology
Resonancia (2002)	Utahime Double Decade (2002)	I Hope So (2003)

Utahime Double Decade (歌姫ダブル・ディケイド, Utahime Daburu Dikeido) is a compilation album by Japanese entertainer Akina Nakamori, released through Universal Music Japan on December 4, 2002 to commemorate Nakamori's 20th anniversary. Produced by Nakamori and Satoshi Takebe, the album consists of self-covers of her singles from the Warner Pioneer era in different styles such as jazz, big band, salsa, tango, ska, and bossa nova.

== Background ==
In mid-September 2002, Nakamori planned to release an original album by the end of the year, but following her summer tour, she decided to revisit her old hits as part of her 20th anniversary celebration. The album features collaborations with Yōichi Murata, Ken Morimura from Orquesta del Sol, Masahiko Kitahara from Tokyo Ska Paradise Orchestra, and Akira Senju.

The album cover features an illustration of Nakamori cosplaying as Jessica Rabbit as a play on the album title using the initials "D.D".

Nakamori performed the new version of "Kazari ja Nai no yo Namida wa" on NHK's 53rd Kōhaku Uta Gassen, making her first appearance on the New Year's Eve special in 14 years.

== Chart performance ==
The album peaked at No. 8 on Oricon's weekly albums chart and charted for 10 weeks. It sold over 83,000 copies.

== Track listing ==
No.	Title	Lyrics	Music	Arrangement	Length
1.	"Double Decade Delivery #1" (Instrumental)		Yōichi Murata	Murata	0:21
2.	"Tattoo [Big Band]"	Yuri Moriko	Anri Sekine	Murata	3:56
3.	"Meu amor é... [Salsa]" (Mi Amōre (ミ・アモーレ))	Chinfa Kan	Naoya Matsuoka	Ken Morimura	4:29
4.	"Tango Noir [Tango]"	Kayoko Fuyumori	Takashi Tsushimi	Satoshi Takebe	4:55
5.	"Kita Wing [Salsa]" (Kita Uingu (北ウイング; "North Wing"))	Kan	Tetsuji Hayashi	Morimura	4:40
6.	"Sand Beige (Sabaku e) [Full Orchestra]" ((SAND BEIGE -砂漠へ-; "Sand Beige (To the Desert)"))	Eiko Kyō	Takashi Tsushimi	Akira Senju	4:42
7.	"Desire (Jōnetsu) [Ska]" (DESIRE -情熱-)	Yoko Aki	Kisaburō Suzuki	Takebe; Masahiko Kitahara (horns)	4:37
8.	"Second Love [Unplugged]" (Sekando Rabu (セカンド・ラブ))	Etsuko Kisugi	Takao Kisugi	Takebe	4:45
9.	"Mizu ni Sashita Hana [Unplugged]" ((水に挿した花; "Flowers in Water"))	Natsumi Tadano	Junko Hirotani	Takebe	4:43
10.	"Shōjo A [Ska]" ((少女A; "Girl A"))	Masao Urino	Hiroaki Serizawa	Toshiya Shimizu; Kitahara (horns)	3:52
11.	"Eki [Full Orchestra]" ((駅; "Station"))	Mariya Takeuchi	Takeuchi	Senju	4:43
12.	"Kazari ja Nai no yo Namida wa [Big Band]" ((飾りじゃないのよ涙は; "The Tears Are Not a Decoration"))	Yōsui Inoue	Y. Inoue	Murata	4:10
13.	"Double Decade Delivery #2" (Instrumental)		Murata	Murata	1:19
14.	"Slow Motion [Bossa Nova]" (Surō Mōshon (スローモーション))	E. Kisugi	T. Kisugi	Takebe	4:26
Total length:					55:55

== Release history ==
Year	Format(s)	Serial number	Label(s)	Ref.
2002	CD	UMCK-1139	UMJ	
2017	UHQCD	UPCH-7266	UMJ	
2023	CD	UPCY-7871	UMJ	
2024	2LP	UPJY-9375/6	UMJ	
