= Variation (Hensoukyoku) =

Studio album by Akina Nakamori
- Released: October 27, 1982
- Recorded: 1982
- Genres: J-pop; kayōkyoku
- Length: 44:08
- Language: Japanese
- Label: Reprise Records
- Producer: Hiroo Oda

Akina Nakamori chronology
Prologue (Jomaku) (1982)	Variation (Hensoukyoku) (1982)	Fantasy (Gensoukyoku) (1983)

Singles from Variation (Hensoukyoku)
- 1. "Shōjo A" Released: July 28, 1982

Variation (Hensoukyoku) (Japanese: バリエーション〈変奏曲〉, Hepburn: Bariēshon (hensōkyoku)) is the second studio album by Japanese entertainer Akina Nakamori. It was released on October 27, 1982, by Warner Pioneer under the Reprise Records label. The album includes the controversial hit single "Shōjo A". It became Nakamori's first number-one album on the Oricon Weekly Albums Chart and her best-selling album.

== Background ==
Variation (Hensoukyoku) is Nakamori's second studio album, released in 1982, three months after the release of her debut album.

The music production team consisted of main arrangers Mitsuo Hagita and Kei Wakakusa, Kisugi siblings Etsuko and Takao, Masao Urino, Hiroaki Serizawa, Yukinojo Mori and Yoshitaka Minami.

Although the album consists of twelve tracks, "Introduction" and "Ending" are instrumental songs written and arranged by Kei Wakakusa.

== Promotion ==
=== Single ===
The album had one promotional single, "Shōjo A". The single debuted at number 5 on the Oricon Single Weekly Charts and remained on the yearly chart at number 34. In The Best Ten Rankings, the single debuted at number 3 and remained on the 1982 yearly chart at number 13.

=== Music home video ===
On 1 May 1985, Nakamori's third debut anniversary, the second music home video Hajimemashita Nakamori Akina was released. The music video clips were filmed in the United States, mainly in Los Angeles and Santa Monica. Filming began before her debut, between 11 and 17 March 1982. Songs recorded from the original Variation album were "Moroi Gogo", "Maerchen Location", "Bye Bye Lullaby", "Shoujo A", "Sakihokoru Hana Ni" and "Aishū Magic".

== Stage performances ==
"Shoujo A" has been performed very often in the music television programs Yoru no Hit Studio, The Best Ten and various live tours.

Most of the songs were performed in the live tour Milky Way in 1983, including "Cancel", "Moroi Gogo", "Aishū Magic", "Bye Bye Lullaby", "Catastrophe no Amagasa", "Maerchen Location" and "Sakihokoru Hana Ni".

"Yokohama Akuma" and "Dai Nanakan (Septieme Sens)" were performed in the live tour Rainbow Shower in 1983.

"Catastrophe no Amagasa" was performed again in the acoustic live Akina Nakamori: 21 Seiki he no Tabidachi in 2000.

== Chart performance ==
The album reached number one on the Oricon Album Weekly Chart for three consecutive weeks, charted 34 weeks and sold over 742,900 copies. It is Nakamori's best sold album. The album was ranked at number 8 on the Oricon Album Yearly Chart in 1983.

== Track listing ==
Side A
No.	Title	Lyrics	Music	Arranger(s)	Length
1.	"Introduction" (Intorodakushon (イントロダクション))		Kei Wakakusa	Wakakusa	1:46
2.	"Cancel!" (Kyanseru! (キャンセル！))	Masao Urino	Kazuhiko Izu	Mitsuo Hagita	3:24
3.	"Moroi Gogo" ((脆い午後; "Fragile Afternoon"))	Tsuzuru Nakasato	Noboru Mimuro	Hagita	4:21
4.	"Aishū Magic" (Aishū Majikku (哀愁魔術(マジック); "Sorrowful Magic"))	Yukinojo Mori	Yasuo Kosugi	Hagita	4:32
5.	"Sakihokoru Hana ni..." ((咲きほこる花に……; "For Blooming Flowers..."))	Etsuko Kisugi	Takao Kisugi	Wakakusa	4:37
6.	"Yokohama A-ku-ma" ((ヨコハマA・KU・MA; "Yokohama D-e-v-i-l"))	Nakasato	Yoshitaka Minami	Hagita	3:42

Side B
No.	Title	Lyrics	Music	Arrangement	Length
1.	"Märchen Location" (Meruhen Rokēshon (メルヘン・ロケーション; "Fairy Tale Location"))	Nakasato	Mimuro	Hagita	4:37
2.	"Shōjo A" ((少女A; "Girl A"))	Urino	Hiroaki Serizawa	Hagita	3:34
3.	"Dainana-kan (Septième Sens)" (Dainana-kan (Settiēmu Sansu) (第七感（セッティエーム・サンス）; "Seventh Sense"))	Mayumi Shinozuka	Minami	Hagita	4:12
4.	"Bye Bye Lullaby" (Bai Bai Rarabai (X3(バイバイ)ララバイ))	Mori	Kosugi	Hagita	3:43
5.	"Catastrophe no Amagasa" (Katasutorofi no Amagasa (カタストロフィの雨傘; "Umbrella of Catastrophe"))	Shinozuka	Tsunehiro Izumi	Wakakusa	4:56
6.	"Ending" (Endingu (エンディング))		Wakakusa	Wakakusa	0:44
Total length:					44:08

2022 Remaster Issue
No.	Title	Lyrics	Music	Arranger(s)	Length
13.	"Yume Handan" (Yume Handan (夢判断))	Nakasato	Mimuro	Hagita	3:24
Total length:					47:39

== Covers ==
=== Shōjo A ===
- Singaporean singer Dawn Yip covered the song in Mandarin as "Bùyào liú xià" (不要留下, "Don't Stay") on her 1983 album of the same name.
- Taiwanese singer Anna Lin covered the song in Mandarin as "Dānshēn nǚláng" (単身女郎, "Single Girl") on her 1983 album Ānnà (安娜). This version was then covered by Chinese singer Yáng Jūnzǐ on her 1986 album Tiàowǔ jiē (跳舞街, Dancing Street) and by Wú xiǎo yún on her 1988 album of the same name.
- Chinese singer Du Du covered the song in Mandarin as "Shàonǚ A" on her 1985 album of the same name.
- Taiwanese singer Annie Yi covered the song in Mandarin as "Xuǎn cuò diànyǐng xuǎn cuò nǐ" (選錯電影選錯你, "You're in the Wrong Movie") on her 1990 album Jǐn jǐn yǒngbào wǒ (緊緊擁抱我, Hold Me Tightly).
- Tak Matsumoto covered the song on his 2003 cover album The Hit Parade, with Azumi Uehara on vocals.
- Miu Nakamura covered the song as the B-side of her 2007 single "Miumiu no Toiki ~Tsuyogaru Ai no Katachi~".
- Ryoko Shiraishi (as Sayoko Arashiyama) covered the song as an insert song in episodes 12 and 13 of the 2008 anime Natsu no Arashi!
- Keisuke Kuwata covered the song on the 2009 live video Shōwa Hachijūsan-nen do! Hitori Benishiro Uta Gassen.
- Janet Kay covered the song in English on her 2012 cover album Idol Kay.
- You Kikkawa covered the song on her 2012 cover album Vocalist?
- Tomomi Itano covered the song as the B-side of the Theater Edition release of her 2013 single "1%".
- Ken Hirai covered the song on his 2014 cover album Ken's Bar III.
- Split BoB covered the song as the B-side of their 2015 single "Mayakashi Shōjo".
- Hitomi Arai covered the song in 2020.

== Release history ==
Year	Format(s)	Serial number	Label(s)	Ref.
1982	LP, CT	L-12550, LKF-8050	Warner Pioneer	
1983	SD, CD	SDM-15004, 35XL-6	Warner Pioneer	
1985	CD	32XL-79	Warner Pioneer	
1991	CD	WPCL-411	Warner Pioneer	
1996	CD	WPC6-8183	Warner Pioneer	
2006	CD, digital download	WPCL-10277	Warner Pioneer	
2012	Super Audio CD, CD hybrid	WPCL-11135	Warner Pioneer	
2014	CD	WPCL-11723	Warner Pioneer	
2018	LP	WPJL-10084	Warner Pioneer	
2022	2CD	WPCL-13387/8	Warner Pioneer	

Notes:

- 2006 re-release includes 24-bit digitally remastered sound source
- 2012 and 2014 re-release includes subtitles in the tracks "2012 remaster"
- 2022 re-release includes lacquer remaster which includes subtitles in the tracks "2022 lacquer remaster" along with original karaoke version of the tracks

== See also ==
- 1982 in Japanese music
