= Prologue (Jomaku) =

Studio album by Akina Nakamori
- Released: July 1, 1982
- Recorded: February 1982 (Los Angeles)
- Genre: J-pop; kayōkyoku
- Length: 38:58
- Language: Japanese
- Label: Reprise Records
- Producer: Hiroo Oda

Akina Nakamori chronology
Prologue (Jomaku) (1982)	Variation (Hensoukyoku) (1982)

Singles from Prologue (Jomaku)
- 1. "Slow Motion" Released: May 1, 1982

Prologue (Jomaku) (プロローグ〈序幕〉, Purorōgu (Jomaku); Prologue (Introduction)) is the debut studio album by Japanese entertainer Akina Nakamori. It was released on July 1, 1982, by Warner Pioneer under the Reprise Records label. The album includes the debut single "Slow Motion". It was recorded in Los Angeles, three months before Nakamori's debut.

== Background ==
Prologue (Jomaku) is the first studio album released in 1982, two months after the release of her debut single "Slow Motion".

The early production of the album began in February and was finished within 5 days. There were five candidate songs to be chosen as a debut single: Slow Motion, Ginga Densetsu, Anata no Portrait, T-Shirt Sunset and Jōken Hansha. From among them, Slow Motion was chosen. During that time, most of the idols had debuted with an uptempo single, while the production staff wanted to make a difference in Nakamori's case and made a debut with a slow ballad.

The music production team consisted of Motoki Funayama, siblings Etsuko and Takao Kisugi, Mayumi Shinozuka, Tsuzuru Nakasato, Yuji Ohno and Shizuka Ijūin.

== Promotion ==
=== Single ===
The album consists of one promotional single "Slow Motion". The single itself wasn't such a huge success as the following single, Shoujo A. The single debuted at number 30 on Oricon Single Weekly Charts and charted 39 weeks.

=== Music home video ===
On May 1, 1985, a second music home video was released Hajimemashita Nakamori Akina. It was released on Nakamori's third debut anniversary. The music videoclips were filmed in the United States, mainly in Los Angeles and Santa Monica. The filming of the music home video began before her debut, between the 11th and 17 March 1982. From the original album Prologue, was recorded Bon Voyage, Slow Motion, Ginga Densetsu and T-Shirt Sunset.

== Stage performances ==
Akina performs Slow Motion in all of her live tours. Some of the songs were performed in the first live tour Milky Way in 1983, such as Anata no Portrait, Ginga Densetsu, and Down Town Story. Bon Voyage, Jōken Hansha, T-Shirt Sunset A-Gata Melancholy, and Imāju no Kageri were performed in the live tour Rainbow Shower in 1983.

== Chart performance ==
The album reached number five on the Oricon Album Weekly Chart for four consecutive weeks, charted 47 weeks and sold over 453,100 copies.

== Track listing ==
Side A
No.	Title	Lyrics	Music	Arrangement	Length
1.	"Anata no Portrait" (Anata no Pōtorēto (あなたのポートレート; "Your Portrait"))	Etsuko Kisugi	Takao Kisugi	Mitsuo Hagita	4:20
2.	"Bon Voyage"	Mayumi Shinozuka	Eriko Tsukayama	Kazuo Ootani	3:46
3.	"Image no Kageri" (Imāju no Kageri (イマージュの翳り, "Drifting Image"))	Shinozuka	Juichi Sase	Hagita	4:08
4.	"Jōken Hansha" ((条件反射; "Conditional Reflection"))	Noboru Mimuro	Nakasato	Funayama	4:03
5.	"T-Shirt Sunset" (Tīshatsu San Setto (Tシャツ・サンセット))	Masamitsu Tayama	Nakasato	Funayama	3:12

Side B
No.	Title	Lyrics	Music	Arrangement	Length
1.	"Ginga Densetsu" ((銀河伝説; "Legend of the Galaxy"))	Shinozuka	Sase	Funayama	3:42
2.	"Slow Motion" (Surō Mōshon (スローモーション))	E. Kisugi	T. Kisugi	Funayama	4:06
3.	"A-gata Melancholy" (Ē-gata Merankorī (A型メランコリー; "Type-A Melancholy"))	Masao Urino	Nakasato	Hagita	3:13
4.	"Hitokakera no Emerald" (Hito kakera no Emerarudo (ひとかけらのエメラルド; "A Piece of Emerald"))	Alice Satō	Yuji Ohno	Kazuo Otani	4:19
5.	"Downtown Story" (Dauntaun Su to〜ri〜 (ダウンタウンすと〜り〜))	Shizuka Ijūin	Kuniko Fukushima	Otani	4:13

== Covers ==
=== Slow Motion ===
- Takao Kisugi self-covered the song on his 1983 album Visitor.
- Ryuichi Kawamura covered the song on his 2006 cover album Evergreen ~Anata no Wasuremono~.
- Mika Orihara covered the song as the B-side of her 2007 single "Oririn Trance ~Heartful Voice~".
- Rie Kugimiya (as Mizore Shizuyuki) covered the song in the 2008 anime Rosario + Vampire.
- Acid Black Cherry covered the song on their 2008 cover album Recreation.
- Donna Fiore covered the song on her 2008 cover album Fiore.
- Sara Takatsuki covered the song on bump.y's cover compilation album Sweet Hits.
- Takeshi Tsuruno covered the song on his 2012 cover album Tsuruno Uta 2.
- Yūji Nakada covered the song on his 2014 cover album Song Composite.
- Hideaki Tokunaga covered the song on his 2015 cover album Vocalist 6.
- Magokoro Brothers covered the song on their 2016 cover album Pack to the Future.

=== Anata no Portrait ===
- Takao Kisugi self-covered the song on his 2011 album Hitasurani.

== Release history ==
Year	Format(s)	Serial number	Label(s)	Ref.
1982	LP, CT	L-12531, LKF-8042	Warner Pioneer	
1983	SD, CD	SDM-15001, 35XL-5	Warner Pioneer	
1985	CD	32XL-103	Warner Pioneer	
1991	CD	WPCL-410	Warner Pioneer	
1996	CD	WPC6-8182	Warner Pioneer	
2006	CD, digital download	WPCL-10276	Warner Pioneer	
2012	Super Audio CD, CD hybrid	WPCL-11134	Warner Pioneer	
2014	CD	WPCL-11722	Warner Pioneer	
2018	LP	WPJL-10083	Warner Pioneer	
2022	2CD	WPCL-13385/6	Warner Pioneer	

Notes:

- 2006 re-release includes 24-bit digitally remastered sound source
- 2012 and 2014 re-release includes subtitles in the tracks "2012 remaster"
- 2022 re-release includes lacquer remaster which includes subtitles in the tracks "2022 lacquer remaster" along with original karaoke version of the tracks

== See also ==
- 1982 in Japanese music
