= New Akina Etranger =

Studio album by Akina Nakamori
- Released: August 10, 1983
- Recorded: 1983
- Genre: Idol kayōkyoku
- Length: 41:06
- Language: Japanese
- Label: Warner Pioneer
- Producer: Yuuzou Shimada

Akina Nakamori chronology
Fantasy (Gensoukyoku) (1983)	New Akina Etranger (1983)	Best Akina Memoires (1983)

New Akina Etranger is the fourth studio album by Japanese singer Akina Nakamori. It was released on August 10, 1983, under the Warner Pioneer label. It was Nakamori's first album to receive an award for The Album of the Year in the 25th Japan Record Awards.

== Background ==
New Akina Etranger is the second studio album released in 1983, five months after the release of the album Fantasy.

The music production team consists of collaborators who produced music for the former idol singer, Momoe Yamaguchi, such as Mitsuo Hagita, Shinji Tanimura and Yoko Aki along with previous collaborators such as Takao and Etsuko Kisugi, Masao Urino and Haruomi Hosono.

It's Nakamori's first album which doesn't include any single tracks. All 10 tracks are newly recorded album tracks.

== Promotion ==
=== Drama theme song ===
Sukoshi Dake no Scandal was promoted as the theme song to the Japanese television drama Ruriiro Generation, which was broadcast on Nippon TV.

=== Music Home Video ===
On December 12, 1983, the music home video New Akina Etranger in Europe was released. It's Nakamori's first video release to be published. The music videoclips were filmed in various places of Europe, such as Paris, Geneva and Rome. Aside of the album tracks, it also includes a filmed recording of the single Kinku, which wasn't released in the original album but instead to the first compilation album Best Akina Memorial.

== Stage performances ==
Nakamori performed most of the songs from the album at her Rainbow Shower live tour in 1983, such as Sayonara ne, Sukoshi dake Scandal, Stripe, Wakurabairo no Love Song and Toki ni wa Ennui.

She performed Venus Tanjou at her first dinner show Dinner Show 1996: An evening with Miss Akina Nakamori.

== Chart performance ==
The album reached number one on the Oricon Album Weekly Chart for two consecutive weeks, charted 16 weeks and sold over 482,100 copies. The album was ranked at number 10 on the Oricon Album Yearly Chart in 1983. In December 1983 it was nominated in 25th Japan Record Awards and won the title The Album of the Year.

== Track listing ==
All tracks are arranged by Mitsuo Hagita, except "Mon Amour (Glass ni Hanbun no Tasogare)" by Haruomi Hosono.

No.	Title	Lyrics	Music	Length
1.	"Sayonara ne"	Etsuko Kisugi	Takao Kisugi	4:26
2.	"Venus Tanjou"	Yoko Aki	Kazuo Saitsu	4:49
3.	"Sukoshi Dake Scandal"	Sho	Sho	3:40
4.	"Kanshou Kiko"	Shinji Tanimura	Tanimura	4:11
5.	"Renaissance: Yasashisa de Kaete"	Masao Urino	Haruomi Hosono	3:27
6.	"Mon Amour (Glass ni Hanbun no Tasogare)"	Urino	Hosono	4:11
7.	"Stripe"	E. Kisugi	T. Kisugi	4:37
8.	"Wakurabairo no Love Song"	Taku	Taku	4:47
9.	"Toki ni wa Ennui"	Aki	Saitsu	3:07
10.	"Kakugo no Aki"	Tanimura	Tanimura	3:51

== Covers ==
=== Kanshou Kikou ===
- Shinji Tanimura, original composer of the song covered during his live tour recital 2022 The Singer: Yume no Sono Saki and was released as a live album "Live at National Theatre of Japan" in 2022.

== Release history ==
Year	Format(s)	Serial number	Label(s)	Ref.
1983	LP, CT, CD, SD	L-12580, LKF-8080, 35XL-15, SDM-15010	Warner Pioneer	
1985	CD	32XL-95	Warner Pioneer	
1991	CD	WPCL-413	Warner Pioneer	
1996	CD	WPC6-8185	Warner Pioneer	
2006	CD, digital download	WPCL-10279	Warner Pioneer	
2012	Super Audio CD, CD hybrid	WPCL-11137	Warner Pioneer	
2014	CD	WPCL-11725	Warner Pioneer	
2018	LP	WPJL-10086	Warner Pioneer	
2022	2CD, 2CD+BD	WPCL-13416/7, WPZL-32020/2	Warner Pioneer	

Notes:

- 2006 re-release includes 24-bit digitally remastered sound source
- 2012 and 2014 re-release includes subtitles in the tracks "2012 remaster"
- 2022 re-release includes lacquer remaster which includes subtitles in the tracks "2022 lacquer remaster" along with original karaoke version of the tracks

== See also ==
- 1983 in Japanese music
