= Shōjo A =

Single by Akina Nakamori

from the album Variation (Hensoukyoku)
- Language: Japanese
- B-side: "Yume Handan"
- Released: July 28, 1982
- Recorded: 1982
- Genre: J-pop; kayōkyoku
- Length: 3:34
- Label: Reprise Records
- Composer: Hiroaki Serizawa
- Lyricist: Masao Urino
- Producer: Hirō Oda

Akina Nakamori singles chronology
"Slow Motion" (1982)	"Shōjo A" (1982)	"Second Love" (1982)

Music videos
- "Shōjo A" (Live) on YouTube

"Shōjo A" (少女A, Shōjo Ē; lit. "Girl A") is the second single by Japanese entertainer Akina Nakamori. Written by Masao Urino and Hiroaki Serizawa, the single was released on July 28, 1982 by Warner Pioneer through the Reprise label. It was also the first single from her second studio album Variation (Hensoukyoku).

== Background ==
"Shōjo A" was the first hit single penned by Urino, who made his debut in 1981 with Chanels' "Hoshikuzu no Dance Hall" (星くずのダンス・ホール, Hoshikuzu no Dansu Hōru; "Stardust Dance Hall"). The idea of the song came from producer Yūzō Shimada, who read Tōkō Kon's book Akutarō (悪太郎) and wanted Nakamori to record a song with the concept of "anti-society". The title refers to an anonymous girl and has nothing to do with "A" being Akina. The lyrics were based on those from an abandoned song titled "Lolita" (ロリータ, Rorīta), which was to have been recorded by Kenji Sawada. Urino drew some inspiration from Momoe Yamaguchi's 1978 single "Playback Part 2".

Nakamori has re-recorded "Shōjo A" for the 2002 self-cover compilation Utahime Double Decade and the 2006 compilation Best Finger 25th Anniversary Selection. In 2010, she re-recorded the song for the pachinko machine CR Nakamori Akina: Utahime Densetsu ~Koi Moni Dome nara~ (CR中森明菜・歌姫伝説〜恋も二度目なら〜; CR Akina Nakamori: Utahime Legend ~If Love Is For the Second Time~).

== Chart performance ==
"Shōjo A" became Nakamori's breakthrough hit, peaking at No. 5 on Oricon's weekly singles chart and selling over 396,000 copies.

== Awards ==
"Shōjo A" earned Nakamori the Newcomer Award at the 13th Japan Music Awards, the 8th Nippon Television Music Festival, the 8th All Japan Kayo Music Festival, the 9th Yokohama Music Festival, and the 15th Japan Cable Awards, the 15th All Japan Cable Broadcasting Awards. She also won the 9th ABC Kayo Rookie Grand Prix Silver Award, the 12th Ginza Music Festival Professional Jury Encouragement Award, the 8th All Japan Kayo Music Festival Newcomer Encouragement Award, the 15th Shinjuku Music Festival Jury Special Encouragement Award, and the 11th FNS Song Festival Outstanding Rookie Award.

== Track listing ==
All music is arranged by Mitsuo Hagita.

Original release
No.	Title	Lyrics	Music	Length
1.	"Shōjo A" ((少女A; "Girl A"))	Masao Urino	Hiroaki Serizawa	3:34
2.	"Yume Handan" ((夢判断; "Dream Judgment"))	Tsuzuru Nakasato	Noboru Mimuro	3:27
Total length:				7:01

1998 reissue bonus track
No.	Title	Lyrics	Music	Length
3.	"Shōjo A (Live Version)" ((少女A(LIVE VERSION)))	Urino	Serizawa

== Charts ==
Weekly charts

Chart (1982)	Peak position
Japan (Oricon)	5
Japan (The Best Ten)	3
Japan (The Top Ten)	3

Year-end charts

Chart (1982)	Peak position
Japan (Oricon)	34
Japan (The Best Ten)	12
Japan (The Top Ten)	8

== Cover versions ==
- Singaporean singer Dawn Yip covered the song in Mandarin as "Bùyào liú xià" (不要留下, "Don't Stay") on her 1983 album of the same name.
- Taiwanese singer Anna Lin covered the song in Mandarin as "Dānshēn nǚláng" (単身女郎, "Single Girl") on her 1983 album Ānnà (安娜). This version was then covered by Chinese singer Yáng Jūnzǐ on her 1986 album Tiàowǔ jiē (跳舞街, Dancing Street) and by Wú xiǎo yún on her 1988 album of the same name.
- Chinese singer Du Du covered the song in Mandarin as "Shàonǚ A" on her 1985 album of the same name.
- Taiwanese singer Annie Yi covered the song in Mandarin as "Xuǎn cuò diànyǐng xuǎn cuò nǐ" (選錯電影選錯你, "You're in the Wrong Movie") on her 1990 album Jǐn jǐn yǒngbào wǒ (緊緊擁抱我, Hold Me Tightly).
- Tak Matsumoto covered the song on his 2003 cover album The Hit Parade, with Azumi Uehara on vocals.
- Miu Nakamura covered the song as the B-side of her 2007 single "Miumiu no Toiki ~Tsuyogaru Ai no Katachi~".
- Ryoko Shiraishi (as Sayoko Arashiyama) covered the song as an insert song in episodes 12 and 13 of the 2009 anime Natsu no Arashi!
- Keisuke Kuwata covered the song on the 2009 live video Shōwa Hachijūsan-nen do! Hitori Benishiro Uta Gassen.
- Janet Kay covered the song in English on her 2012 cover album Idol Kay.
- You Kikkawa covered the song on her 2012 cover album Vocalist?
- Tomomi Itano covered the song as the B-side of the Theater Edition release of her 2013 single "1%".
- Ken Hirai covered the song on his 2014 cover album Ken's Bar III.
- Split BoB covered the song as the B-side of their 2015 single "Mayakashi Shōjo".
- Hitomi Arai covered the song in 2020.
- Yu Shirota covered the song in Nakamori's 2025 tribute album "Nakamori Akina Tribute Album: Meikyo"

== Release history ==
Year	Format(s)	Serial number	Label(s)	Ref.
1982	7inch LP	L-1616	Warner Pioneer	
1988	8cm CD, CT	10SL-131, 10L5-4041	Warner Pioneer	
1998	12cm CD	WPC6-8659	Warner Pioneer	
2008	Digital download	-	Warner Pioneer	
2014	Digital download - remaster	-	Warner Pioneer	

== See also ==
- 1982 in Japanese music
