= Second Love (song) =

Single by Akina Nakamori

from the album Fantasy (Gensoukyoku)
- Language: Japanese
- B-side: "Kagami no Naka no J"
- Released: November 10, 1982
- Recorded: 1982
- Genre: J-pop; kayōkyoku
- Length: 4:25
- Label: Reprise Records
- Composer: Takao Kisugi
- Lyricist: Etsuko Kisugi
- Producer: Misako Nohara

Akina Nakamori singles chronology
| "Shōjo A" (1982) | "Second Love" (1982) | "½ no Shinwa" (1983) |

Music videos
- "Second Love" (Live) on YouTube

"Second Love" (セカンド・ラブ, Sekando Rabu) is the third single by Japanese entertainer Akina Nakamori. Written by Etsuko Kisugi and Takao Kisugi, the single was released on November 10, 1982, by Warner Pioneer through the Reprise label. It was also the lead single from her third studio album Fantasy (Gensoukyoku).

== Background ==
"Second Love" was originally written for Junko Ohashi as a follow-up to her 1981 hit single "Silhouette Romance" (シルエット・ロマンス, Shiruetto Romansu), but was passed on to Nakamori. Following the success of Nakamori's second single "Shōjo A", the director of her talent agency wanted the next single to be "Cancel!" (キャンセル！, Kyanseru!), as it was also written by Masao Urino. However, the rest of the agency were not enthusiastic about releasing the song, and it was decided that "Second Love" would be the third single instead. Akira Terabayashi, who was Nakamori's promotion manager at the time, wanted to show listeners her wide musical range with "Second Love".

Nakamori has re-recorded "Second Love" for the 1995 compilation True Album Akina 95 Best and the 2002 self-cover compilation Utahime Double Decade. In 2010, she re-recorded the song for the pachinko machine CR Nakamori Akina: Utahime Densetsu ~Koi Moni Dome nara~ (CR中森明菜・歌姫伝説〜恋も二度目なら〜; CR Akina Nakamori: Utahime Legend ~If Love Is For the Second Time~).

== Chart performance ==
"Second Love" became Nakamori's first No. 1 on Oricon's weekly singles chart and sold over 766,000 copies, becoming the biggest-selling single in her career.

== Awards ==
"Second Love" earned Nakamori the Excellent Star Award at the 16th All Japan Wired Broadcasting Awards. In addition, the single earned Takao Kisugi the Grand Prix at the 3rd Japan Composition Awards.

== Track listing ==
All music is arranged by Mitsuo Hagita.

Original release
| No. | Title | Lyrics | Music | Length |
|---|---|---|---|---|
| 1. | "Second Love" (Sekando Rabu (セカンド・ラブ)) | Etsuko Kisugi | Takao Kisugi | 4:25 |
| 2. | "Kagami no Naka no J" ((鏡の中のJ; "J in the Mirror")) | Yoshiko Miura | Ken Satō | 3:34 |
| Total length: | | | | 7:59 |

1998 reissue bonus track
| No. | Title | Lyrics | Music | Length |
|---|---|---|---|---|
| 3. | "Second Love (Live Version)" ((セカンド・ラブ(LIVE VERSION))) | E. Kisugi | T. Kisugi |

== Charts ==
| Chart (1982) | Peak position |
|---|---|
| Japan (Oricon) | 1 |

== Cover versions ==
- Takao Kisugi self-covered the song on his 1983 album Visitor.
- Hong Kong singer Sara Lee covered the song in Cantonese as "Tuì biàn" (蛻変, "Metamorphosis") on her 1985 album Lǐlìruǐ liàn qǔ jí (李麗蕊恋曲集, Sara Lee's Love Songs).
- Yukari Itō covered the song on her 2002 cover album Touch Me Lightly.
- Ai Nonaka (as Minoru Izumi) covered the song on the 2005 cover album Mansuri Moe on Vocal Collection Vol. 1.
- Chiyo covered the song in 2007.
- Mika Suzuki covered the song on the 2007 various artists cover album 80's Hit Parade.
- Colega Bossa Club covered the song on their 2008 album Futokoro Mellow J Bossa Winter Lounge.
- Risa covered the song in 2008.
- Junichi Inagaki and Yu-ki covered the song on Inagaki's 2008 cover album Otoko to Onna: Two Hearts Two Voices.
- Julee Karan covered the song on her 2011 cover album Torch.
- Yoshimi Iwasaki covered the song on her 2013 cover album The Reborn Songs: Cyclamen.
- Natsuki Morikawa covered the song on her 2016 cover album J: Sentimental Cover.
- Ayano Kudō covered the song as the B-side of her 2017 single "Koi Goyomi".
- Kim Jae-joong covered the song on his 2020 cover album Love Covers II.
- Toki Asako covered the song in Nakamori's 2025 tribute album "Nakamori Akina Tribute Album: Meikyo".

== Release history ==
| Year | Format(s) | Serial number | Label(s) | Ref. |
|---|---|---|---|---|
| 1982 | 7inch LP | L-1620 | Warner Pioneer | |
| 1988 | 8cm CD, CT | 10SL-132, 10L5-4042 | Warner Pioneer | |
| 1998 | 12cm CD | WPC6-8660 | Warner Pioneer | |
| 2008 | Digital download | - | Warner Pioneer | |
| 2014 | Digital download - remaster | - | Warner Pioneer | |

== See also ==
- 1982 in Japanese music
