= Vocalist? =

Studio album by You Kikkawa
- Released: November 7, 2012
- Recorded: 2012
- Genre: J-pop; dance-pop
- Length: 49:50
- Language: Japanese
- Label: Universal J
- Producer: Hachioji P; DarvishP; KEI; Nishizawasan P; Junky; Yairi; MSR; colete; Kameria; T-Pocket

You Kikkawa chronology
One for You! (2012)	Vocalist? (2012)	Two You (2013)

Limited Edition cover

Vocalist? (ボカリスト?, Bokarisuto?) is a cover album by Japanese singer You Kikkawa. Released through Universal J on November 7, 2012, the album features covers of popular J-pop songs from the 1980s to the 2000s. The album cover features an anime-style caricature of Kikkawa. A limited edition release features a real picture of Kikkawa as the album cover and includes a DVD containing Miku Miku Dance (MMD) version music videos for "Koko kara Hajimarunda!" and "Darling to Madonna".

The album peaked at No. 40 on Oricon's albums chart.

== Track listing ==
CD
No.	Title	Lyrics	Music	Original artist	Length
1.	"Watashi ga Obasan ni Natte mo" ((私がオバさんになっても; "Even If I Become an Old Lady"))	Chisato Moritaka	Hideo Saitō	Chisato Moritaka	4:27
2.	"Itoshisa to Setsunasa to Kokoro Zuyosa to" ((恋しさと せつなさと 心強さと; "Of the Beloved, of Sadness, of Responsibility"))	Tetsuya Komuro	Komuro	Ryōko Shinohara with t.komuro	4:02
3.	"Kaze wa Akiiro" ((風は秋色; "The Wind Is the Color of Fall"))	Yoshiko Miura	Yūichirō Oda	Seiko Matsuda	4:12
4.	"Secret Base ~Kimi ga Kureta Mono~" ((Secret Base~君がくれたもの~; "Secret Base ~What You Gave Me~"))	Norihiko Machida	Machida	Zone	5:20
5.	"Maji de Koisuru Gobyōmae" ((MajiでKoiする5秒前; "5 Seconds Before a Serious Love"))	Takeshi Fujii	Fujii	Ryōko Hirosue	4:01
6.	"Samishii Nettaigyo" ((淋しい熱帯魚; "Lonely Tropical Fish"))	Neko Oikawa	Masaya Ozeki	Wink	4:10
7.	"17-sai" (Jūnana-sai (17才; "17 Years Old"))	Mieko Arima	Kyōhei Tsutsumi	Chisato Moritaka	3:44
8.	"Daite Hold on Me!" ((抱いてHOLD ON ME!; "Hold Me Hold on Me!"))	Tsunku	Tsunku	Morning Musume	4:22
9.	"Shōjo A" ((少女A; "Girl A"))	Masao Urino	Hiroaki Serizawa	Akina Nakamori	3:38
10.	"Natsuiro no Nancy" ((夏色のナンシー; "Summer Colored Nancy"))	Miura	Tsutsumi	Yu Hayami	3:31
11.	"Sotsugyō" ((卒業; "Graduate"))	Takashi Matsumoto	Tsutsumi	Yuki Saitō	4:22
12.	"Love Namidairo" ((LOVE涙色; "Love (The Color of Tears)"))	Tsunku	Tsunku	Aya Matsuura	4:01
Total length:					49:50

Limited Edition Bonus DVD
No.	Title	Lyrics	Music	Length
1.	"Koko kara Hajimarunda! (MMD Ver.)" ((ここから始まるんだ!; "Let's Start Here!"))	SmileR	SmileR
2.	"Darling to Madonna (MMD Ver.)" ((ダーリンとマドンナ; "Darling and Madonna"))	SmileR	SmileR

== Charts ==
Chart (2012)	Peak position
Japanese Albums (Oricon)	40
