= Idol Kay =

Studio album by Janet Kay
- Released: May 23, 2012
- Recorded: 2012
- Genre: Reggae
- Length: 46:13
- Label: Universal Music Japan

Janet Kay chronology
Lovin' You... More (2003)	Idol Kay (2012)	Dramatic Lovers (2012)

Idol Kay (アイドル・ケイ, Aidoru Kei) is a cover album by British singer Janet Kay. Released through Universal Music Japan on 23 May 2012, the album features English-language reggae covers of popular J-pop songs from the 1970s, 1980s, and 1990s.

== Track listing ==
No.	Title	Lyrics	Music	Original artist	Length
1.	"Akai Sweet Pea" (Akai Suīto Pī (赤いスイートピー, "Red Sweet Pea"))	Takashi Matsumoto	Karuho Kureda	Seiko Matsuda	3:41
2.	"Yume no Naka e" ((夢の中へ, "Into a Dream"))	Yōsui Inoue	Y. Inoue	Yōsui Inoue	2:42
3.	"Samishii Nettaigyo" ((淋しい熱帯魚, "Lonely Tropical Fish"))	Neko Oikawa	Masaya Ozeki	Wink	3:22
4.	"Waku Waku Sasete" ((WAKU WAKUさせて, "Excite Me More"))	Matsumoto	Kyōhei Tsutsumi	Miho Nakayama	2:51
5.	"Arashi no Sugao" ((嵐の素顔, "The True Face of the Storm"))	Yoshiko Miura	Tsugutoshi Gotō	Shizuka Kudo	3:46
6.	"Shōjo A" ((少女A, "Girl A"))	Masao Urino	Hiroaki Serizawa	Akina Nakamori	3:01
7.	"Sushi Kui Nee!" ((スシ食いねェ!, "I Don't Eat Sushi!"))	Fumiko Okada; S.I.S.	TZ	Shibugakitai	4:08
8.	"Machibuse" ((まちぶせ))	Yumi Arai	Arai	Hitomi Ishikawa	2:51
9.	"Sailor Fuku to Kikanjū" (Sērā Fuku to Kikanjū (セーラー服と機関銃, "Sailor Uniform and Machine Gun"))	Etsuko Kisugi	Takao Kisugi	Hiroko Yakushimaru	4:04
10.	"Love Machine (feat. Ai Takahashi)" (Rabu Mashīn (LOVEマシーン))	Tsunku	Tsunku	Morning Musume	4:13
11.	"Gakuen Tengoku" ((学園天国, "School Heaven"))	Yū Aku	Daisuke Inoue	Finger 5	3:43
12.	"Toshishita no Otokonoko" ((年下の男の子, "Younger Boy"))	Kazuya Senke	Yūsuke Hoguchi	Candies	3:26
13.	"Love Machine [Soft Punk Mix]"	Tsunku	Tsunku	Morning Musume	4:54
