= Sand Beige (Sabaku e) =

Single by Akina Nakamori

from the album Best
- Language: Japanese
- English title: Sand Beige (To the Desert)
- B-side: "Tsubaki Juliana"
- Released: June 19, 1985
- Recorded: 1985
- Genre: J-pop; kayōkyoku
- Length: 4:37
- Label: Reprise Records
- Composer: Takashi Tsushimi
- Lyricist: Eiko Kyo
- Producer: Yūzō Shimada

Akina Nakamori singles chronology
"Akaitori Nigeta" (1985)	"Sand Beige (Sabaku e)" (1985)	"Solitude" (1985)

Music videos
- "Sand Beige (Sabaku e)" (Live) on YouTube

"Sand Beige (Sabaku e)" (SAND BEIGE -砂漠へ-, Sando Beiji -Sabaku e-; lit. "Sand Beige (To the Desert)") is the 12th single by Japanese entertainer Akina Nakamori. Written by Eiko Kyo and Takashi Tsushimi, the single was released on June 19, 1985, by Warner Pioneer through the Reprise label. It was also the lead single from her second compilation album Best.

== Background ==
The theme of "Sand Beige (Sabaku e)" is a farewell trip, with the lyrics based on travel photos and tour guide books that Nakamori collected over the years. The foreign lyrics written in katakana are in Egyptian Arabic. The jacket photo was taken in Manila.

Nakamori has re-recorded "Sand Beige (Sabaku e)" for the 2002 self-cover compilation Utahime Double Decade.

== Chart performance ==
"Sand Beige (Sabaku e)" became Nakamori's ninth No. 1 on Oricon's weekly singles chart and sold over 460,700 copies.

== Track listing ==
All music is arranged by Akira Inoue.

Original release
No.	Title	Lyrics	Music	Length
1.	"Sand Beige (Sabaku e)" (Sando Beiji -Sabaku e- (SAND BEIGE -砂漠へ-; lit. "Sand Beige (To the Desert)"))	Eiko Kyo	Takashi Tsushimi	4:37
2.	"Tsubaki Juliana" (Tsubaki Juriāna (椿姫ジュリアーナ; "Camelia Juliana"))	Ikki Matsumoto	Takashi Satō	4:02
Total length:				8:39

1998 reissue bonus track
No.	Title	Lyrics	Music	Length
3.	"Sand Beige (Sabaku e) (Live Version)" ((SAND BEIGE -砂漠へ-(LIVE VERSION)))	Kyo	Tsushimi

== Charts ==
Chart (1985)	Peak position
Japan (Oricon)	1

== Release history ==
Year	Format(s)	Serial number	Label(s)	Ref.
1985	7inch LP	L-1669	Warner Pioneer	
1988	8cm CD, CT	10SL-142, 10L5-4051	Warner Pioneer	
1998	12cm CD	WPC6-8668	Warner Pioneer	
2008	Digital download	-	Warner Pioneer	
2014	Digital download - remaster	-	Warner Pioneer	

== See also ==
- 1985 in Japanese music
