= Solitude (Akina Nakamori song) =

Single by Akina Nakamori

from the album Best
- Language: Japanese
- B-side: "Again"
- Released: October 9, 1985
- Recorded: 1985
- Genre: J-pop; kayōkyoku
- Length: 4:25
- Label: Reprise Records
- Composer: Yukihide Takekawa
- Lyricist: Reiko Yukawa
- Producer: Yūzō Shimada

Akina Nakamori singles chronology
| "Sand Beige (Sabaku e)" (1985) | "Solitude" (1985) | "Desire (Jōnetsu)" (1986) |

Music videos
- "Solitude" (Live) on YouTube

"Solitude" (ソリチュード, Sorichūdo) is the 13th single by Japanese entertainer Akina Nakamori. Written by Reiko Yukawa and Yukihide Takekawa, the single was released on October 9, 1985, by Warner Pioneer through the Reprise label. It was also the second single from her second compilation album Best.

The single became Nakamori's 10th No. 1 on Oricon's weekly singles chart and sold over 335,800 copies.

== Track listing ==
All music is arranged by Satoshi Nakamura.

Original release
| No. | Title | Lyrics | Music | Length |
|---|---|---|---|---|
| 1. | "Solitude" | Reiko Yukawa | Yukihide Takekawa | 4:25 |
| 2. | "Again" | Mai Arai | Arai | 4:29 |
| Total length: | | | | 8:54 |

1998 reissue bonus track
| No. | Title | Lyrics | Music | Length |
|---|---|---|---|---|
| 3. | "Solitude" (Live Version) | Yukawa | Takekawa |

== Charts ==
| Chart (1985) | Peak position |
|---|---|
| Japan (Oricon) | 1 |

== Release history ==
| Year | Format(s) | Serial number | Label(s) | Ref. |
|---|---|---|---|---|
| 1985 | 7inch LP | L-1670 | Warner Pioneer | |
| 1988 | 8cm CD, CT | 10SL-143, 10L5-4052 | Warner Pioneer | |
| 1998 | 12cm CD | WPC6-8670 | Warner Pioneer | |
| 2008 | Digital download | - | Warner Pioneer | |
| 2014 | Digital download - remaster | - | Warner Pioneer | |

== See also ==
- 1985 in Japanese music
