= Slow Motion (Akina Nakamori song) =

Single by Akina Nakamori

from the album Prologue (Jomaku)
- Language: Japanese
- B-side: "Jōken Hansha"
- Released: May 1, 1982
- Recorded: 1982
- Genre: J-pop; kayōkyoku
- Length: 4:07
- Label: Reprise Records
- Composer: Takao Kisugi
- Lyricist: Etsuko Kisugi
- Producer: Hirō Oda

Akina Nakamori singles chronology
"Slow Motion" (1982)	"Shōjo A" (1982)

Music videos
- "Slow Motion" (Live) on YouTube

"Slow Motion" (スローモーション, Surō Mōshon) is the debut single by Japanese entertainer Akina Nakamori. Written by Etsuko Kisugi and Takao Kisugi, the single was released on May 1, 1982, by Warner Pioneer through the Reprise label. It was also the first single from her debut studio album Prologue (Jomaku).

== Background ==
"Slow Motion" was recorded in Los Angeles, with the studio sessions filmed for the TV special Hajimemashite, Nakamori Akina (はじめまして 中森明菜; Nice to Meet You, Akina Nakamori), released in 1985.

The B-side is "Jōken Hansha", which was the lead song in Prologue (Jomaku).

Nakamori has re-recorded "Slow Motion" for the 1995 compilation True Album Akina 95 Best and the 2002 self-cover compilation Utahime Double Decade. In 2010, she re-recorded the song for the pachinko machine CR Nakamori Akina: Utahime Densetsu ~Koi Moni Dome nara~ (CR中森明菜・歌姫伝説〜恋も二度目なら〜; CR Akina Nakamori: Utahime Legend ~If Love Is For the Second Time~).

== Chart performance ==
"Slow Motion" peaked at No. 30 on Oricon's weekly singles chart and sold over 174,000 copies.

== Awards ==
"Slow Motion" earned Nakamori the Newcomer Awards at the 1st Megalopolis Kayo Festival, the 15th All-Japan Wired Broadcasting Awards, and the 10th KBC Newcomer Song Music Festival.

== Track listing ==
All music is arranged by Motoki Funayama.

Original release
No.	Title	Lyrics	Music	Length
1.	"Slow Motion" (Surō Mōshon (スローモーション))	Etsuko Kisugi	Takao Kisugi	4:07
2.	"Jōken Hansha" ((条件反射; "Conditional Reflection"))	Tsuzuru Nakasato	Noboru Mimuro	4:03
Total length:				8:10

1998 reissue bonus track
No.	Title	Lyrics	Music	Length
3.	"Slow Motion (Live Version)" ((スローモーション(LIVE VERSION)))	E. Kisugi	T. Kisugi

== Charts ==
Chart (1982)	Peak position
Japan (Oricon)	30

== Cover versions ==
- Takao Kisugi self-covered the song on his 1983 album Visitor.
- Ryuichi Kawamura covered the song on his 2006 cover album Evergreen ~Anata no Wasuremono~.
- Mika Orihara covered the song as the B-side of her 2007 single "Oririn Trance ~Heartful Voice~".
- Rie Kugimiya (as Mizore Shizuyuki) covered the song in the 2008 anime Rosario + Vampire.
- Acid Black Cherry covered the song on their 2008 cover album Recreation.
- Donna Fiore covered the song on her 2008 cover album Fiore.
- Sara Takatsuki covered the song on bump.y's cover compilation album Sweet Hits.
- Takeshi Tsuruno covered the song on his 2012 cover album Tsuruno Uta 2.
- Yūji Nakada covered the song on his 2014 cover album Song Composite.
- Hideaki Tokunaga covered the song on his 2015 cover album Vocalist 6.
- Magokoro Brothers covered the song on their 2016 cover album Pack to the Future.
- Shiori Tamai covered the song in Nakamori's 2025 tribute album "Nakamori Akina Tribute Album: Meikyo"

== Release history ==
Year	Format(s)	Serial number	Label(s)	Ref.
1982	7inch LP	L-1600	Warner Pioneer	
1988	8cm CD, CT	10SL-130, 10L5-4040	Warner Pioneer	
1998	12cm CD	WPC6-8658	Warner Pioneer	
2008	Digital download	-	Warner Pioneer	
2014	Digital download - remaster	-	Warner Pioneer	
2022	7inch LP+BD	WPZL-31955/6	Warner Pioneer	

== See also ==
- 1982 in Japanese music
