= Hatsumi Shibata =

Japanese jazz and pop singer (1952–2010)

- Also known as: Hatsumi Kanna, Mamanika
- Born: Hatsumi Hosogo
- Origin: Tokyo, Japan
- Genres: Jazz, Pop music
- Occupation: Singer
- Years active: 1968-2010
- Label: Nippon Columbia

Hatsumi Shibata (しばたはつみ; April 11, 1952 – March 27, 2010) was a Japanese singer. She also went by the earlier stage name Hatsumi Kanna, Mamanika.

== Career ==
Born in Shinjuku, Tokyo, she was an only child. Her father was the jazz pianist Yasushi Shibata and her mother a vocalist. Iyo Matsumoto was a second cousin.

From the age of 9, she started singing at the officers' club in the US military camp. In 1967, when she was 15, she sang a commercial song for a fashion maker. She debuted as Hatsumi Kanna in 1968 with Victor with the song Otome no Kisetsu/B-Side: Koi to Umi to Taiyo to.

After graduating from Rissho Gakuen High School, she lived in the United States for two years, before returning to Japan and debuting Hatsumi Shibata in 1974 with Nippon Columbia with the single Gokey.

In the 1970s, she studied under the jazz pianist Yuzuru Sera, before releasing the 1975 album The Woman Who Sings the Blues. Her 1977 single My Luxury Night became a hit at number 17 on the Oricon charts. She was an active live concert performer as a jazz vocalist both in Japan, the United States and other countries.

On March 27, 2010, she died aged 57 of a heart attack.

== Awards ==
- 1968- 1st Shinjuku Music Festival Gold Award (Hatsumi Kanna)
- 1975- 1st Spain Mallorca Music Festival Runner-up, Simpatico Award
- 1975 - 4th Nakano Sunplaza Music Festival Jury Encouragement Award
- 1975 - 4th Tokyo Music Festival Domestic Tournament Golden Canary Award
- 1975 - 4th Tokyo Music Festival World Tournament, Bronze Prize, Foreign Jury Award
- 1977- 9th TV Awards Special Award " Sound in "S" "
- 1981 - The 10th Tokyo Music Festival World Tournament Best Singing Award
- 1996- 12th Japan Jazz Vocal Award Grand Prize
