= Takao Kisugi =

Japanese singer and songwriter (born 1950)

Takao Kitsugi Takao Kisugi 来生たかお
- Born: Takao Kisugi (来生孝夫); November 16, 1950 (age 75); Tokyo, Japan
- Genres: Kayōkyoku, Idol Kayōkyoku, New Music, Enka, Pop
- Occupations: Composer, singer-songwriter
- Instruments: piano, acoustic guitar
- Years active: 1972–present
- Label: Universal Music
- Website: http://www.kisugitakao.com/

Takao Kisugi (来生 たかお, Kisugi Takao), born November 16, 1950, in Tokyo, Japan, is a Japanese singer and songwriter. In 1974, he debuted as a songwriter and in 1976 made his solo debut as a singer. He often collaborates on songs with his sister, Etsuko Kisugi, who is a lyricist. In 1982, on the third Japan Composition Award, he received the "Best Composer" music award for the song Second Love. In his career, spanning over 45 years, he composed over 400 songs.

== Career ==
Kisugi started work with Yosui Inoue's band in 1972. He debuted as a singer-songwriter with the single Asai Yume, released in 1976. His popularity and fame increased in 1979 after the release of a domestic hit, My Luxury Night, performed by Hatsumi Shibata. In the 1980s, he produced many hits of the kayōkyoku genre, including "Second Love", "Silhouette Romance", and "Goodbye Day". His best known song as a performer, Yume no Tochu (夢の途中), was covered by teen-age idol Hiroko Yakushimaru as Sailor Fuku to Kikanju (セーラー服と機関銃) for the movie of the same name, and became a huge success. He recorded the first ending song of Maison Ikkoku, "Ashita Hareru ka". In 1991, he wrote and recorded the song "What a Way (To Show I Love You)" with Gilbert O'Sullivan. Another song on which they collaborated, "Can't Think Straight", was featured on the Japanese edition of O'Sullivan's studio album Sound of the Loop.

== Musical style ==
=== Influences ===
He said that his own songwriting had been deeply influenced by The Beatles and Gilbert O'Sullivan from western music and by Hiroshi Inoue from eastern music. Other influences include Francis Ray, Henry Mancini, and Burt Bacharach.

== Discography ==
=== Albums ===
==== Studio albums ====
Title	Album details	Peak chart positions
Title	Album details	JPN Oricon
Asai Yume (浅い夢)	Released: 21 October 1976; Label: Kitty; Formats: CD, Cassette tape, LP, digital download	-
Zigzag (グザグ)	Released: 21 October 1977; Label: Kitty; Formats: CD, Cassette tape, LP, digital download	-
By My Side	Released: 1 January 1978; Label: Kitty; Formats: CD, Cassette tape, LP, digital download	-
At Random	Released: 1 July 1980; Label: Kitty; Formats: CD, Cassette tape, LP, digital download	-
Sparkle	Released: 21 July 1981; Label: Kitty; Formats: CD, Cassette tape, LP, digital download	54
Yume no Tochu (夢の途中)	Released: 10 December 1981; Label: Kitty; Formats: CD, Cassette tape, LP, digital download	2
Yuhodo (遊歩道)	Released: 1 November 1982; Label: Kitty; Formats: CD, Cassette tape, LP, digital download	12
Ordinary	Released: 25 July 1983; Label: Kitty; Formats: CD, Cassette tape, LP, digital download	12
Romantic Cinematic	Released: 10 August 1984; Label: Kitty; Formats: CD, Cassette tape, LP, digital download	18
Only Yesterday	Released: 25 November 1985; Label: Kitty; Formats: CD, Cassette tape, LP, digital download	18
I Will...	Released: 25 September 1986; Label: Kitty; Formats: CD, Cassette tape, LP, digital download	18
Étranger	Released: 25 November 1987; Label: Kitty; Formats: CD, Cassette tape, LP, digital download	26
With Time	Released: 25 November 1988; Label: Kitty; Formats: CD, Cassette tape, LP, digital download	28
Something Else	Released: 25 November 1989; Label: Kitty; Formats: CD, Cassette tape, digital download	74
Eien no Shunkan (永遠の瞬間)	Released: 25 April 1991; Label: Kitty; Formats: CD, Cassette tape, digital download	31
Passage	Released: 26 November 1993; Label: Kitty Enterprise; Formats: CD, Cassette tape, digital download	82
Another Story	Released: 2 November 1994; Label: Kitty Enterprise; Formats: CD, digital download	-
Purity	Released: 21 February 1997; Label: Nippon Columbia; Formats: CD, digital download, streaming	-
Dear My Company	Released: 10 November 2000; Label: Kitty Mme; Formats: CD, digital download	-
Égalité	Released: 17 November 2004; Label: Any; Formats: CD, digital download	-
Avantage	Released: 19 October 2005; Label: Any; Formats: CD, digital download	-
Yoin (余韻)	Released: 10 October 2008; Label: Any; Formats: CD, digital download, streaming	-
Hitasura ni (ひたすらに)	Released: 12 December 2010; Label: Any; Formats: CD, digital download, streaming	-
Tsuioku (追憶)	Released: 10 November 2021; Label: Any; Formats: CD, digital download, streaming	-

==== Self-cover albums ====
Title	Album details	Peak chart positions
Title	Album details	JPN Oricon
Visitor	Released: 21 October 1983; Label: Kitty; Formats: CD, Cassette tape, LP, digital download	18
Labyrinth	Released: 1 December 1984; Label: Kitty; Formats: CD, Cassette tape, LP, digital download	17
Labyrinth II	Released: 25 October 1991; Label: Kitty; Formats: CD, Cassette tape, digital download	68
Yume Yori Took he: Melodies & Stories (夢より遠くへ -melodies & stories-)	Released: 1 November 1995; Label: Kitty; Formats: CD, digital download	-

==== Live albums ====
Title	Album details	Peak chart positions
Title	Album details	JPN Oricon
Try to Remember	Released: 25 June 2008; Label: Any; Formats: CD, digital download	-
40th Anniversary Symphonic Concert 2015-2016: Yume no Ato saki (40th Anniversary Symphonic Concert 2015-2016 ～夢のあとさき～)	Released: 17 January 2018; Label: Any; Formats: CD, digital download	-

==== Compilation albums ====
Title	Album details	Peak chart positions
Title	Album details	JPN Oricon
Biography	Released: 1 August 1979; Label: Kitty; Formats: LP, Cassette tape	-
Biography II	Released: 25 April 1982; Label: Kitty; Formats: LP, Cassette tape	-
Songs	Released: 25 April 1982; Label: Kitty; Formats: LP, Cassette tape	-
The Ballads	Released: 1 December 1982; Label: Kitty; Formats: LP, Cassette tape	-
Songs Vol.2	Released: 1 March 1983; Label: Kitty; Formats: LP, Cassette tape	-
Takao Graffiti	Released: 1 December 1984; Label: Kitty; Formats: LP, Cassette tape	-
Takao Graffiti II	Released: 25 April 1986; Label: Kitty; Formats: LP, Cassette tape	-
Best Selections	Released: 1 December 1987; Label: Kitty; Formats: LP, Cassette tape	-
Goodbye Day	Released: 1 July 1989; Label: Kitty; Formats: CD, Cassette tape	42
Theme Songs	Released: 13 September 1992; Label: Kitty Enterprise; Formats: CD, Cassette tape	-
Futari no Basho Ballad Selection (二人の場所 Ballad Selection)	Released: 25 July 1996; Label: Kitty Enterprise; Formats: CD	-
Special 1800 (スペシャル1800)	Released: 21 November 1996; Label: Kitty Enterprise; Formats: CD	-
The Best of Takao Kisugi Yume no Tochuu ni (The Best of TAKAO KISUGI 夢の途中に…)	Released: 25 May 1997; Label: Kitty Enterprise; Formats: CD	-
Single Collection I 1976-1984	Released: 10 June 1998; Label: Kitty Enterprise; Formats: CD	-
Single Collection II 1984-1995	Released: 10 June 1998; Label: Kitty Enterprise; Formats: CD	-
Treasure Collection	Released: 30 June 1999; Label: Kitty Enterprise; Formats: CD	-
Super Value	Released: 19 December 2001; Label: Kitty Mme; Formats: CD	-
Golden Best Kisugi Takao Biography (GOLDEN☆BEST 来生たかお BIOGRAPHY)	Released: 26 November 2003; Label: Universal International; Formats: CD	-
Golden Best Kisugi Takao Visitors (GOLDEN☆BEST 来生たかお VISITORS)	Released: 2 June 2004; Label: Universal J; Formats: CD	-
CD & DVD The Best	Released: 29 June 2005; Label: Universal J; Formats: CD	-
Best 10	Released: 9 November 2005; Label: Universal J; Formats: CD	-
Best&Best	Released: 9 December 2006; Label: Universal Music Japan; Formats: CD	-
Kisugi Takao: Miwaku no Hitto Shuu (来生たかお 〜魅惑のヒット集〜)	Released: 15 December 2006; Label: Universal Music Japan; Formats: CD	-
Best Slow Motion (BEST スローモーション)	Released: 19 June 2007; Label: Universal Music Japan; Formats: CD	-
The Premiums Best Kisugi Takao (ザ・プレミアム・ベスト 来生たかお)	Released: 18 March 2009; Label: USM Japan; Formats: CD	-
Yume no Ato saki (夢のあとさき)	Released: 27 January 2016; Label: Any; Formats: CD	-
Kisugi Takao 40 Shuunen Kinen Sakuhin Shuu Works (来生たかお40周年記念作品集 "WORKS")	Released: 8 June 2016; Label: Universal Music Japan; Formats: CD	-

==== Box sets ====
Title	Album details	Peak chart positions
Title	Album details	JPN Oricon
Kisugi Takao Osakuhinshuu Times Go By (来生たかお作品集 Times Go By)	Released: May 2001; Label: Any; Formats: 11CDs	-
Kisugi Takao Odaizenshuu (来生たかお大全集)	Released: 21 March 2007; Label: Universal Music Japan; Formats: CDs	-

=== Singles ===
Year	Album	Chart positions (JP)	Label
1976	Asai Yume (浅い夢)	-	Kitty
1977	Yaketa Natsu (灼けた夏)	-	Kitty
1977	Naga Ame (長雨-ながあめ-)	-	Kitty
1978	Akage no Rinjin (赤毛の隣人)	-	Kitty
1978	Katasumi ni Hitori (片隅にひとり)	-	Kitty
1979	Soshite, Hiru Sagari (そして、昼下り)	-	Kitty
1979	Anata dake Good Night (あなただけGood Night)	-	Kitty
1980	Hon no Nostalgy (ほんのノスタルジー)	-	Kitty
1981	Tonikaku, Ashita (とにかく、あした)	-	Kitty
1981	Goodbye Day	-	Kitty
1981	Yume no Tochuu-Sailo Fuku to Kikanjuu (夢の途中-セーラー服と機関銃-)	4	Kitty
1982	Kibun wa Gyaku Kousen/Silhouette Romance (気分は逆光線-シルエット・ロマンス)	-	Kitty
1982	Giwaku (疑惑)	-	Kitty
1983	Mukuchi na Yoru (無口な夜)	-	Kitty
1983	Toiki no Hibi (吐息の日々)	-	Kitty
1984	Sotto Midnight (そっとMIDNIGHT)	-	Kitty
1984	Shiroi Mayoi (白いラビリンス（迷い）)	-	Kitty
1985	Haguresouna Tenshi (はぐれそうな天使)	42	Kitty
1986	Ashita Hareruka (あした晴れるか)	57	Kitty
1986	Farewell (フェアウェル)	-	Kitty
1987	Toki wo Sakasete (時を咲かせて)	-	Kitty
1988	Oración: Inori (ORACIÓN -祈り-)	96	Kitty
1989	Katarizuku Ai ni (語りつぐ愛に)	-	Kitty
1989	Silent Memory	-	Kitty
1990	Yume yori Tooku he (夢より遠くへ)	-	Kitty
1991	Deate Yokatta (出会えてよかった)	-	Kitty
1992	Tameiki no Ato de (ため息のあとで)	-	Kitty
1992	Aisuru Jikan ni (愛する時間に)	-	Kitty
1993	Futari no Basho (二人の場所)	-	Kitty Enterprise
1994	Yawaraka na Shigeki (やわらかな刺激)	-	Kitty Enterprise
1994	Eien naru Jousho (永遠なる序章)	-	Kitty Enterprise
1997	Kawaita Kiseki (渇いた季節)	-	Nippon Columbia
1998	Dokomademo Koigokoro (どこまでも恋心)	-	Nippon Columbia
1998	Hozue no Koufuku (頬杖の幸福)	-	Nippon Columbia
2000	Chijou no Speed (地上のスピード)	-	Kitty Mme
2002	Day by Day	-	Spinich

==== Collaboration single ====
Year	Album	Chart positions (JP)	Label
1988	Oración: Inori (ORACIÓN -祈り-): with Yuki Saito	4	Pony Canyon

=== Other appearances ===
List of non-studio album or guest appearances that feature Takao Kisugi
Year	Artist	Title	Album/Single	Label
1972	Yōsui Inoue		Danzetsu	Polydor
1978	Yumi Matsutoya	Convert 1954	Ryuusenkei '80	Universal Music
1981	Keiko Mizukoshi	Kataranai	Jiggle	Polydor
1982	Kaori Momoi	Single Night, Nejiretta Heart, Oose	Show?	Sony Music
1983	Masayoshi Takanaka	Noon	Can I Sing?	Kitty
1988	Tetsuya Tsujihata	Early in the Morning: Shiawase no Asa	Presents For Lovers Vol.2	-
1991	Gilbert O'Sullivan	Can't Think Straight	Sounds of the Loop	Unison Square Music

Notes: "Can't Think Straight" was featured only on the Japanese edition of the album. For the worldwide issue, its guest vocal was replaced by Peggy Lee.

== Videography ==
=== Live albums ===
Release	Title	Serial No.+Format	Label
21 April 1983	Kisugi Takao Live Much more...	W00V-6019(VHS); LNK-303(LD)	Kitty
21 March 1985	Labyrinth Kisugi Takao with Paul Mauriat	CSMV-0049(VHS); VHM-58075(VHD); SM058-0043(LD)	Kitty
3 December 1989	Takao Kisugi The Video Something Else	KFV-002(VHS)	Kitty
23 May 1991	Kisugi Takao Concert Tour: Eien no Shunkan	KTVV-1002(VHS); KTLV-1002(LD)	Kitty
26 September 1993	Takao Kisugi Acoustic Tracks	KTVV-1026(VHS); KTLV-1026(LD)	Kitty
25 October 1995	Takao Kisugi Live Asai Yume Kara	KTVV-1044(VHS); KTLV-1044(LD)	Kitty
27 June 2005	Best of Concert Films 1983-1995	UMBK-9120/4 (DVD)	Universal Sigma
16 November 2006	Takao Kisugi 30th Anniversary X'mas Concert 2005 avantage	TEND-1116/8 (2DVD)	Ten Years
24 December 2011	Takao Kisugi 35th Anniversary Solo Live Premium Stand Alone 2011 at Suntory Hall	TEND-1119 (DVD)	Ten Years

== Songwriting credits ==
=== 1970s ===
Show more

List of songs written for other artists, showing year released and album name
Year	Title	Artist(s)	Album/Single	Label
1974	"Yoidore Tenshi no Polka"	Yuka Kamebuchi	Touch Me, Yuka	Polydor
1975	"Shuushifu", "Highway"	Teruhiko Aoi	Shuushifu	Polydor
1975	"Uwa no Sora"	Kahori Takeda	Uwa no Sora	Kitty
1977	"Shuumaku (Epilogue)"	Teruhiko Aoi	Feeling In	Teichiku
1977	"Surechigai Highway"	Seri Ishikawa	Kimagure	Nippon Phonogram
1977	"Ashita no Kaze"	Seri Ishikawa	Seri First Live	Nippon Phonogram
1977	"My Luxury Night"	Hatsumi Shibata	My Luxury Night	Nippon Columbia
1977	"Meguriai"	Mamiko Takada	Fukigenna Tenshi	Kitty
1977	"April Wave"	Masayoshi Takanaka	Takanaka	Kitty
1977	"Ai no Ashiato", "Boku wa Uchuu Hikoushi Part I/PartII", "Younenki kara no Dasshutsu"	Flying Kitty Band	5・4・3・2・1・0	Kitty
1978	"Hitotsuki no Nochi", "My Little Bird"	Matsumoto Hakuō II	Feeling In	Bourbon
1978	"Sore ga Suteki", "Koi no Moyougae"	Tomoko Ogawa	Sore ga Suteki	Nippon Phonogram
1978	"Kininarunoni", "Shoufu Ichiwa"	Kaori Momoi	Two	Nippon Phonogram
1978	"Shiren"	Teruhiko Saigō	Shiren	Nippon Crown
1978	"Ima kara Hitori", "Nise Don Juan"	Sumiko Yamagata	Emerald Shower	Nippon Columbia
1978	"Hohoemi no Tobira"	Tomokazu Miura	Hohoemi no Tobira	CBS Sony
1978	"Tadayoi no Naka de"	Momoe Yamaguchi	Cosmos Uchuu	CBS Sony
1978	"Koi no Swing"	Maria Anzai	Koi no Swing	Victor
1978	"Honnori Aishite", "Silhouette"	Yukari Ito	Yukari Anata no Tonari ni	Victor
1979	"In The Mood", "Nanogori no Scat", "Enryo Shinaide"	Yukari Itou	Anata Shika Mienai	Victor
1979	"A Distance", "Hoshigatari"	Hiromi Ōta	Feelin' Summer	Victor
1979	"Kurayami ni Sayonara", "Honkijanai nara"	Hatsue Katou	Feelin' Summer	Nippon Phonogram
1979	"Sugite Iku to..."	Kaori Momoi	Watashi	Nippon Phonogram
1979	"Kagami no Mukougawa", "Hakkiri Shiteyo"	Tomoko Kuwae	Born Free	SMS
1979	"Koibito no Ryoubun"	Tomoko Kuwae	Neppuu	SMS
1979	"Usuku Ragari"	Rumiko Koyanagi	Spain no Ame	SMS
1979	"Shinayakana Ai"	Teruhiko Saigō	Shinayakana Ai	Nippon Crown
1979	"Sekiranun", "Nitamono Doushi"	Yosuke Tagawa	Aozora Meguri	Victor
1979	"Sayonara no Etude"	Mariko Takahashi	Hitori Aruki	Victor
1979	"2Bai Ureshii Nichiyoubi"	Cherish	2Bai Ureshii Nichiyoubi	Victor
1979	"Tsubame", "Renka"	Peggy Hayama	Renka: Manyou no Kokoro wo Motomete	King
1979	"Utsukushii Onna: Emeraldas", "Otokotachi no Ballad"	Yoshito Machida	Utsukushii Onna: Emeraldas	Nippon Columbia
1979	"Aoi Shousou", "Illusion", "Sasayaki Game", "Sore Dake no?", "Nanataba in Tokyo", "Hakubo", "Hito no Kimochi wo Shiranaide", "My Way wo Kuchizusaminagara", "Nagisa Meguri"	Tomokazu Miura	Sobyou Dessan	CBS Sony
1979	"Odayakana Kouzu", "Suiyoubi no Cuole"	Momoe Yamaguchi	A Face in a Vision	CBS Sony
1979	"Get Free"	Momoe Yamaguchi	L.A. in Blue	CBS Sony

=== 1980s ===
Show more

List of songs written for other artists, showing year released and album name
Year	Title	Artist(s)	Album/Single	Label
1980	"Bokura no Diary"	H20	Bokura no Diary	Kitty
1980	"Now! What's happen?", "Salad Biyori"	Mariko Tsubota	Diary Tsubota Mariko II	King
1980	"Nanigenaku Futari", "Namida no Memoir"	Kaoru Sudou	Chef's Special	CBS Sony
1980	"Nanairo no Tanuki", "Shoka no Kareha"	Tomokazu Miura	Ki Ika Ai	CBS Sony
1980	"Koi wa Senrigan", "Yami no Kaori"	Momoe Yamaguchi	This is my trial	CBS Sony
1980	"Ai wa Korekara", "Subete Kiri no Naka"	Mariko Takahashi	Sunny Afternoon	Victor
1980	"Daybreak", "Saigetsu no Mado", "Monologue no Kugatsu", "Yuunagi", "Rumble"	Mariko Takahashi	Monologue	Victor
1981	"City Polka"	Yoshimi Iwasaki	Weather Report	Canyon
1981	"Silhouette Romance"	Junko Ohashi	Silhouette Romance	Philips
1981	"Sailor Fuku to Kikanjuu", "Atarimae no Niji"	Hiroko Yakushimaru	Sailor Fuku to Kikanjuu	Kitty
1981	"Anata no Me"	Ouyang Fei Fei	Still stay in love	Polydor
1981	"Haru no Yokan"	BG4	Jarin Ko Chie	CBS Sony
1981	"Koishichai soune"	Kaori Momoi	Five	Nippon Phonogram
1981	"Koi ni Cheerio", "Banka"	Tomoko Saitou	20Ans Vantan	Teichiku
1981	"Tsumi na Ame: So sad rain", "Yowasete! Dandy"	Eri Hayakawa	City	Teichiku
1981	"Alone", "Kiss me more"	Ikue Sakakibara	Ready Lady Ikue Jishin II	Nippon Columbia
1981	"Yarusena Ai", "Shien"	Yuri Shimazaki	After Hour	Nippon Columbia
1981	"Tasogare no Machi kara", "Mahiru no Omoi", "Tea for Memory"	Mariko Takahashi	Tenderness	Victor
1981	"Morning"	Mariko Takahashi	Lovendow	Victor
1981	"Sasurai City", "Gosan (Mistake)"	Kazuhiro Nishimatsu	Good Times	Victor
1981	"Sasoi Ame", "Hanamuke"	Yukio Hashi	Sasoi Ame	Victor
1982	"Slow Motion"	Akina Nakamori	Slow Motion (Akina Nakamori song)	Reprise
1982	"Anata no Portrait"	Akina Nakamori	Prologue (Jomaku)	Reprise
1982	"Saki Hokoru Hana ni"	Akina Nakamori	Variation (Hensoukyoku)	Reprise
1982	"Second Love"	Akina Nakamori	Second Love (song)	Reprise
1982	"Good-bye Again"	Keiko Masuda	Koisuru Tomodachi	Reprise
1982	"Windy Night", "Love me please"	Agape House	Agape House	CBS Sony
1982	"Onna de Are, Odoko de are"	Hiromi Go	My Collection	CBS Sony
1982	"Present", "Himawari no Oka", "Sunset Beach"	Seiko Matsuda	Pineapple	CBS Sony
1982	"Little Birthday"	Kaoru Sudou	Amazing Toys	CBS Sony
1982	"Nejireta Heart De", "Signal Night"	Kaori Momoi	Nejireta Heart De	CBS Sony
1982	"Elevator no Onna", "Samishikumo nakute", "Paradox Blues", "Murasakiiro no...", "Oose"	Kaori Momoi	Show?	CBS Sony
1982	"Tomedonaku"	Seri Ishikawa	MÖBIUS	Philips
1982	"Karisome", "Slow Memory"	Ikue Sakakibara	Slow Memory Ikue Jishin III	Nippon Columbia
1982	"Mono Omoi Season", "Yuuyami no Futari"	Keiko Saito	Mono Omoi Season	Teichiku
1982	"Pepper Flower Love"	Mizue Takada	Glass no Hana/Ai no Owari ni	Teichiku
1982	"Kanashii Kurai Honto no Hanashi"	Tomoyo Harada	Kanashii Kurai Honto no Hanashi	Canyon
1982	"Tokimeki no Accident"	Tomoyo Harada	Tokimeki no Accident	Canyon
1982	"Aenai Yoru ni wa"	Miki Matsubara	Aya	Pony
1982	"Taiyou no Mistress", "Kinuiro no Yume"	Yumi Takigawa	Yume Migokochi	Taurus
1982	"Farewell"	Mariko Takahashi	Dear	Victor
1982	"Ame Nishi Nonde", "Made wo Minagara"	Los Indios	Ame Nishi Nonde	Polydor
1982	"Moetsukite Desire"	Tazumi Toyoshima	Moetsukite Desire	Kitty
1982	"One More Night"	Takako Mamiya	Love Trip	Kitty
1983	"Twilight (Yūgure Dayori)"	Akina Nakamori	Twilight (Yūgure Dayori)	Reprise
1983	"Sayonara Ne", "Stripe"	Akina Nakamori	New Akina Etranger	Reprise
1983	"Vacation"	Asuka Suita	Vacation	Reprise
1983	"Kataomoi Garden", "Koi wa Yakimoki koto"	Asuka Suita	Inspiration	Reprise
1983	"Yume hodo Himitsu"	Kumiko Takeda	Communication	Reprise
1983	"Koi naraba Sukoshi...", "Sasayakana Imagination", "Madoi no Fuukei"	Naoko Kawai	Album	Nippon Columbia
1983	"Straw Touch no Koi", "Wakakusa Iro no Kokoro de"	Naoko Kawai	Straw Touch no Koi	Nippon Columbia
1983	"Baramado"	Naoko Kawai	It's a Beautiful Day	Nippon Columbia
1983	"Gimonfu", "Tsumetai kara Hero"	Naoko Kawai	Gimonfu	Nippon Columbia
1983	"Amai Kotoba de", "Tsuki Akari ni Tsutsumarete"	Masatoshi Nakamura	Born New	Nippon Columbia
1983	"Manazashi no Kanata", "Waratte yo Moonlight"	Hibari Misora	Waratte yo Moonlight	Nippon Columbia
1983	"Binetsu Kana"	Maiko Itō	Binetsu Kana	CBS Sony
1983	"Shiawase no Basho"	Kaoru Sudou	Drops	CBS Sony
1983	"Miami Gogo 5ji"	Seiko Matsuda	Utopia	CBS Sony
1983	"Wink", "Silvery Moonlight", "Parties Queen"	Seiko Matsuda	Canary	CBS Sony
1983	"Itoshii Ashita: Afureru Ai ni"	Izumi Yukimura	Itoshii Ashita: Afureru Ai ni	CBS Sony
1983	"Watashi Takanna Koro"	Michiko Kawai	Watashi Takanna Koro	Kitty
1983	"Soba ni ite Hoshii"	Yasuko Kuwata	Tokimeki	Toshiba Emi
1983	"Yoru ni Aosamete"	Naoko Ken	Standard ni Kanashikute	Canyon
1983	"Aisaretagatteiru Kuseni"	Keiko Sato	Aisaretagatteiru Kuseni	Teichiku
1983	"Tomadoi Ame"	Mizue Takada	Toorisugita Kaze	Teichiku
1983	"Maboroshi Hodo ni", "Melancholy Harbor"	Ruiko Kuruhashi	Thanks	Polydor
1983	"Monument"	Shoko Sawada	Nagareru Kisetsu no Naka de	Nippon Crown
1983	"Ki ga Ikisouna Sora"	Reona Hirota	Daijoubu My Friend	East World
1983	"Bus no Mado kara"	Yutaka Mizutani	Lucky	For Life
1983	"Yaketsuku Memory"	Tooru Watanabe	Yaketsuku Memory	Epic
1984	"Natsu Hazama", "Mabushii Futari de"	Akina Nakamori	Anniversary	Reprise
1984	"Shiroi Labyrinth", "Horizon"	Akina Nakamori	Possibility	Reprise
1984	"Hodou no Ballerina"	Reina Muramoto	Street Scandal	East World
1984	"Hatachi Koseiha"	Reona Hirota	Hatachi Koseiha	East World
1984	"Aitakatta"	Yoshiko Tanaka	Yoshiko	Victor
1984	"Otoko to Onna no Memory"	Shinichi Mori	Hito wo Koi Uru Uta	Victor
1984	"Yoru ni Kanpai"	Toshihiko Tahara	Toshi 10r New York	Canyon
1984	"Futari no Symphony", "Kaze no Kokyuu"	Nagisa Katahira	Futari no Symphony	King
1984	"Hitori ni Somaru"	Sayuri Yoshinaga	Yume Zakuri: Tengoku no Eki	Kitty
1984	"My Joyful Heart"	Yasuko Kuwata	My Joyful Heart	Toshiba Emi
1984	"Ai ni Iku Kataomoi"	Yasuko Kuwata	Ai ni Iku Kataomoi	Toshiba Emi
1984	"Sonna Futari de"	Yasuko Kuwata	Vacation	Toshiba Emi
1984	"Glass no Love Letter"	Yasuko Kuwata	Glass no Love Letter	Toshiba Emi
1984	"Shunrai no Kanata kara"	Naoko Kawai	Ai: Naoko no Wakakusa pro no Tabi Dream of Journey	Nippon Columbia
1984	"Kiwotsukete Natsu", "Shiokaze no Yakusoku", "Mebius no Tameiki"	Naoko Kawai	Summer Delicacy	Nippon Columbia
1984	"Ai wo Azukete"	Tadahime Kiyohara	Ai wo Azukete	Nippon Columbia
1984	"Ame ni Sentimental"	Masatoshi Nakamura	Monday Morning Blues	Nippon Columbia
1984	"Anata de Nakereba"	Hibari Misora	Suisen no Uta Misora Hibari Pops wo Utau	Nippon Columbia
1985	"Isoganaide"	Maiko Ito	Chiisana Drama	CBS Sony
1985	"Motto Shinjitsu", "Shinjugai no Namida"	Maiko Ito	Motto Shinjitsu	CBS Sony
1985	"Sayonara no Memai"	Yoko Minamino	Sayonara no Memai	CBS Sony
1985	"Byakuya no Valerie"	Shibugakitai	Burrow Gang	CBS Sony
1985	"Ai Yori Tooku"	Satomi Morimura	Ai Yori Tooku	CBS Sony
1985	"Hoshi no Dejavu"	Tomoyo Harada	Soushun Monogatari	CBS Sony
1985	"Glass no Adiantum"	Noriko Matsumoto	Bellflower	CBS Sony
1985	"Modorenai Hibi"	Masahiko Minoya	Modorenai Hibi	CBS Sony
1985	"Prologue Again", "Mou Mori he wa Kaeranai"	Yukari Usami	Kuuki ni Naritai	Canyon
1985	"Little Days"	Mizue Takada	Ai no Monologue	Teichiku
1985	"Ame no Himawari"	Morio Kazama	Tokyo Samishigariya	Nippon Columbia
1985	"Ai no Sanaka de", "Koufuku"	Masatoshi Nakamura	Ouvas-tu？	Nippon Columbia
1985	"Sayonara wa Iranai"	Kunihiko Mitamura	Sound Track	Nippon Columbia
1985	"Mou Soko Made no Kisetsu"	Youki Kudoh	Only You	Humming Bird
1985	"Kojin Seikatsu Privacy"	Mikako Hashimoto	Kojin Seikatsu Privacy	Reprise
1985	"Ame no Road Show"	Yuki Saito	Axia	Pony
1985	"Yuki Akari no Machi"	Yuki Saito	Yuki no Danshou Sound Sketch	Pony
1985	"Christmas Avenue", "Bamboo Boat"	Hiroko Yakushimaru	Yume Juuya	East World
1986	"Two Call", "Nageki no Puzzle"	Kaoru Akimoto	Cologne	Victor
1986	"Shiroi Yoru"	Seiko Matsuda	Supreme	CBS Sony
1986	"Ai wo Oshiete"	Mai Yamane	Embassy	Teichiku
1986	"With"	Kazuki Kosakai	With	For Life
1986	"Nichiyou wa Dame", "Yume de wa Night", "Tsuioku no Koi"	Kazuki Kosakai	The Nextdoor Boy	For Life
1986	"Cosmos Tsuuhin"	Yuki Saitou	Glass no Koudou	Canyon
1986	"Anata no Koe wo Kitta Yoru"	Yuki Saitou	Chime	Canyon
1986	"Oikaze no Pony Tale"	Yuki Saitou	May	Canyon
1986	"Odoru Fuji Dancing Prince", "Rival wa Nido Nock suru"	Toshihiko Tahara	Otoko...Itai	Canyon
1986	"Hito Natsu no Actress", "Wagamama"	Miho Nakayama	Summer Breeze	King
1986	"Hitomi de Kataomoi", "Sensitive Heart"	Saori Yagi	Hitomi de Kataomoi	King
1986	"Sayoko", "Kin no Nami, Gin no Suna"	Mami Yamase	Ribbon	King
1986	"Tamerai no Whisper"	Shouko Minami	Sophisticated	Kitty
1986	"Atsui Kaze no Sayonara", "Mabayui no Joshou"	Minako Fujishiro	Atsui Kaze no Sayonara	Futureland
1986	"Yumeiro no Message", "Tsubasa ni Notte"	Tomomi Nishimura	Yumeiro no Message	East World
1986	"Mietemasuka, Yume", "Drama"	Tomomi Nishimura	Mietemasuka, Yume	East World
1986	"Fushigi Shinjite", "Hoshi no Hababata"	Tomomi Nishimura	Yumeiro no Shunkan	East World
1987	"Oritsumu Yoru"	Takenori Emoto	Sutekina Jealousy	Polydor
1987	"Remember"	Kazama Sanshimai	Remember	Hummingbird
1987	"Isso Anata ni", "Kisetsu ni Break"	Rie Hatada	Premier	Reprise
1987	"Rakuen no Door", "Yoru no Higashigawa"	Yoko Minamino	Rakuen no Door	CBS Sony
1987	"Sayonara no Shigeki", "Hana Sakedomo"	Yoshie Kashiwabara	Aishuu	East World
1987	"Natsu wo Matasete"	Tomomi Nishimura	Hajimemashite Ai	East World
1987	"Memorial", "Kimi he no Diary"	Tomomi Nishimura	Pocket ni Ai	East World
1987	"Another Day", "Musical Night"	Kazuki Kosakai	Someone Like You: Anata ni Nita Hito	For Life
1987	"Hitomi ni Tenki Ame"	Naoko Shimada	Prologue	Nippon Columbia
1987	"Watashi, Hakken"	Saori Yagi	Purity	King
1987	"Okureta Love Song"	Saori Yagi	Okureta Love Song	King
1987	"Soyo Kaze Time", "Harukaze Ihen"	Saori Yagi	Moon & Love	King
1987	"Natsu no Yoru no Yume"	Yumi Yamagata	Wind for mind	King
1988	"19Ji no Lunar"	Yui Asaka	Believe Again	Hummingbird
1988	"Anata wo Miteitai"	Izumi Igarashi	Sunao ni Narenakute	Teichiku
1988	"Gomenne..."	Ai Yasunara	I Love You	Teichiku
1988	"Tameiki Nuance"	Rika Himenogi	Fairy Tale	Canyon
1988	"Natsuiro no Focus"	Miki Fujitani	Foundation through the year	Reprise
1988	"Kage", "Yume Yori Subayaku"	Chiyo Okumura	Kage	Nippon Columbia
1988	"Kagami no Naka no Watashi", "Keshigomu de Keshita Jealousy"	Naoko Shimada	Tanpopo no Sougen	Nippon Columbia
1988	"Prologue Kareha no Rondo"	Kunihiko Mitamura	Rondo	Nippon Columbia
1988	"Shitsurenza", "Owaranai Yume"	Kaori Moritani	Shitsurenza	Nippon Columbia
1988	"Stanger Shingan"	Kazuki Kosakai	Pocket no Suna	For Life
1988	"Oración: Inori", "Hanakaze"	Yuki Saitou	Oración: Inori	Canyon
1988	"Sutekina Tanin", "Yureru Omoi"	Yasunori Sugahara	Yumehito yo	Apolon
1988	"Omoi no Kakera"	Noriko Matsumoto	Ame to Suiyoubi	CBS Sony
1988	"Aisuru koto wo Manabu noni"	Yashiki Takajin	Aisuru koto wo Manabu noni	Victor
1988	"Race no Cardigan"	Kaori Sakagami	Race no Cardigan	East World
1988	"Mitsu no Tsuki", "Lemon wo Kajirinagara"	Kaori Sakagami	Kisetsu no Prologue	East World
1988	"Hoshizora Kaisen"	Ryouko Sano	Hoshizora Kaisen	BMG Victor
1988	"Hisashi no Introduction"	Ryouko Sano	Espressivo: Taisetsuna Tomodachi he	BMG Victor
1989	"Sorezore no Hohoemi", "Ima no mama ga Ii"	Shoko Inoue	Kanojo no Shima	Taurus
1989	"John to Merry no tame ni"	Shoko Inoue	Mary Laurent no Shima	Taurus
1989	"Setogiwa", "Ame no Kotoba"	Kazuki Kosakai	Marginal	For Life
1989	"Kimi no Keshiki", "Mahiru no Eien", "Usually"	Kazuki Kosakai	Zattou	For Life
1989	"Koi no Bamen"	Noriko Sakai	All Right	Victor
1989	"Table Monogatari", "Eien..."	Akira Fuse	Mosaic	Victor
1989	"10gatsu no Soda Mizu"	Kaori Sakagami	Natsu Yasumi	East World
1989	"Kataritsugu Ai ni"	Hiroko Yakushimaru	Kataritsugu Ai ni	East World
1989	"Tsubame ga Tonda Sora"	Hiroko Yakushimaru	Lover's Concerto	East World
1989	"Please stop rainy day", "Kansoukyoku no ato de"	Reiko Sada	Hitori Aruki	CBS Sony
1989	"Concerto"	Project C	Silent Mebius Music Album Caution	Kitty
1989	"Kanashii no wa Komaru no", "Long Hair to Kawa Jacket"	Kaori Moritani	Kanashii no wa Komaru no	Nippon Columbia
1989	"Felt no Pen Case"	Megumi Mori	Yume Miru Jikan	Nippon Columbia
1989	"Kinenbi"	Sumika Yamanaka	Naze	Nippon Columbia
1989	"Tabun Koishiteru", "Gimonfu"	Sumika Yamanaka	Genki shitemasuka...	Nippon Columbia

=== 1990s ===
Show more

List of songs written for other artists, showing year released and album name
Year	Title	Artist(s)	Album/Single	Label
1990	"Anata Jishin"	Reiko Sada	Kimi wo Shinjite	CBS Sony
1990	"Mujin Eki"	Mamiko Tayama	Mujin Eki	Sony
1990	"I Love You wa Kumo ni Nosete"	Hikaru Genji	Cool Summer	Pony Canyon
1990	"Mezame", "Yureru Gogo"	Nami Hirai	Mezame	Vap
1990	"Glowing Up", "Kimi no Kaze"	Mitsuko Horie	Glowing Up	Columbia
1990	"Lonesome Day"	Hiroko Yakushimaru	Heart's Delivery	Toshiba Emi
1990	"Gekka Kou: Moonlight Rose"	Sumika Yamanaka	Haru Hana Zakari: Sumika no Haru/Natsu Collection	Nippon Columbia
1991	"Long Distance Love"	Satoshi Ikeda	Wish	Teichiku
1991	"Ichinen Mae no Koibito"	Wink	Queen Of Love	Polystar
1991	"What A Way（To Show I Love You）"	Gilbert	What A Way（To Show I Love You）	Toshiba Emi
1991	"Kiramekiza"	Saeko Shuu	Ashita mo Ii koto aru youni	Toshiba Emi
1991	"Dokomademo Yasashiku"	Yuri Kunizane	New Faces	Nippon Columbia
1991	"Sotto Cool Down"	Kazuki Kosakai	Oo no Otona ga...	For Life
1991	"Utsuroi"	Yūko Kotegawa	Bonté	Pony Canyon
1991	"Over the Dreams"	Hikaru Genji	Victory	Pony Canyon
1991	"After Love", "Nagareru"	Mariko Takahashi	Sweet Journey	Victor
1991	"Himawari", "Hirusagari no Jouji"	Goro Noguchi	Meigaza	New Taurus
1991	"Atatakai Ame", "Umi ni Katarikakete", "Kenka no Ato de", "Haru wa Mada Awaku", "Mada Yume Dake no"	Nami Hirai	Yume no silhouette	Vap
1991	"Kagayakitai Kara", "Ochitekuru Toki no Mukou ni"	Nami Hirai	Kagayakitai Kara	Vap
1991	"My Birthday wish come true"	Ruiko Kuruhashi	For your anniversary	Vap
1992	"Seventeen"	A.S.A.P	Vacation Hot Lovin	Nippon Columbia
1992	"Wakakusa no Sasayaki"	Akane Oda	Akane Hakusho	Nippon Columbia
1992	"Kaiten Mokuba"	Masahiro Kuwana	Kaiten Mokuba	Alpha
1992	"Roman Shashinkan"	Masahiro Kuwana	Hyakumannin ni Hitori no Onna	Alpha
1992	"Sarigenai Yoru ni"	Hiroyuki Sanada	Sarigenai Yoru ni	Victor
1992	"Mizu no Toiki"	Mariko Takahashi	Lady Coast	Victor
1992	"No Control"	Masayuki Suzuki	Fair Affair	Epic Sony
1992	"Riyuu wo Kikasete"	Yuri Nakae	Memoir	BMG Victor
1992	"Hitoribocchi no Kokuhaku","Tsubame ni natte Tondechau yo"	Yayoi Niijima	Sucré	Pony Canyon
1992	"Hoshi wa Nakanai"	Yayoi Niijima	Hoshi wa Nakana	Pony Canyon
1993	"Matteirukara", "Mood"	Yashiki Takajin	Mood: Yume Miru Otoko no Tame ni	Polystar
1993	"Anata he no Omoi"	Wink	Brunch Saki Hokore Itoshisayo	Polystar
1993	"Anata wo Wakaritai", "Tayumanai Yoru ni", "Modoru Kokoro"	Nami Hirai	Tenohira no Tenhenshuu	Vap
1993	"Merry Christmas Wish"	A.S.A.P	Merry Christmas Wish	Nippon Columbia
1993	"Sky: Itoshisa ni Tokete"	Yuki Aya	Sky: Itoshisa ni Tokete	Polydor
1993	"Sayonara wo Maki Modoshite"	Yuki Aya	Heart Strings	Polydor
1993	"Soko ni Inai Anata"	Seijirou Shimomura	Soko ni Inai Anata	Polydor
1994	"Ojiichan no Kouwagi", "Sakura wa Haru no Tegami"	Hiroshi Itsuki	Heisei no Do-yo	Tokuma Japan Communications
1994	"Yume no Naka"	Hekiru Shiina	Shiena	Sony
1994	"Kanashiku Akaku"	Takeshi Kaga	Otoko to Onna de Itai yoru	Toshiba Emi
1994	"Kokoro no Ashioto"	Chiyono Yoshino	Hadashi no Ballerina	Toshiba Emi
1994	"Hagureta Senaka"	Yashiki Takajin	Yasashii Onna ni wa Doku ga aru	Polystar
1994	"Ii Kagari"	Yashiki Takajin	Naitara Make	Polystar
1994	"Arashi no Naka Sakebu Koe ni"	Nami Hirai	Cavendish no Oka to Kumo	Vap
1994	"Kuchibiru Dakeshika Anata wo Shiranai"	Zhou Bingqian	Love Songs	Victor
1994	"Sazanami no Kisetsu"	Mizugi Ooura	...and one	NEC Avenue
1995	"Sokokara Korekara no Kisetsu"	Yukari Itou	Beautiful Days	Alpha
1995	"2nen Ato no Propose"	Junko Iwao	Hajimemashite	Pony Canyon
1995	"Hizashi no Kiooku"	Kazuki Kosakai	With K	For Life
1995	"Umi wo Daki"	Akira Kobayashi	Best Hit Zenkyokushuu Vol.2	Sony Records
1996	"Flight Schedule"	Kye Eun-Sook	Ai Hitotsu Yume Hitotsu	Taurus
1996	"Omoide Yori Kono Shunkan"	Yashiki Takajin	Moshi mo Yume ga Kanau naraba	Polystar
1996	"Sweet Moonlight"	Cherish	Wonderful Days	Victor
1996	"Hi goto Yoru goto"	Cherish	Ai to wa Yuuki Dakara	Victor
1996	"Ai no Nagori"	Emiko Shiratori	Grace Kioku no Kakeratachi	Funhouse
1996	"Ima wa Omoidaseru"	Marcia Kazue Otsuru	Days	Nippon Columbia
1996	"Tamerai no Aki"	Chiyoko Shimakura	Kokoro Kasanegi	Nippon Columbia
1997	"Aurora no Adagio"	Kei Ogura	Aurora no Adagio	Nippon Columbia
1997	"Heavenly Blue", "Sayonara no Machi de"	Ran Takano	Heavenly Blue	Polydor
1997	"Matteagete"	Yashiki Takajin	Yureta Rowami	Polystar
1998	"Omoidenite"	Yashiki Takajin	Omoidenite	Polystar
1999	"Tooi Umi"	Masashi Sada	Twenty Five Reasons	Teichiku
1999	"Birthday Card"	Mariko Takahashi	Two for nine	Victor

=== 2000s-present ===
Show more

List of songs written for other artists, showing year released and album name
Year	Title	Artist(s)	Album/Single	Label
2000	"Toki wo Kagayakasete"	Junko Yagami	Toki wo Kagayakasete	Webkoo
2001	"Shiawase wo Mou Ichido"	Yashiki Takajin	Yashiki Takajin Anthology	Polystar
2001	"Another Birthday"	Takako Matsu	Koishii Hito	Universal Music Japan
2002	"Natsu no Rakugaki"	Takako Matsu	Clover	Universal Music Japan
2002	"Hibiki Au Kokoro"	EPO	Hibiki Au Kokoro	-
2003	"Futari no After Noon"	Junko Ohashi	June	Vap
2004	"Kuchizuke"	Kumiko	Watashi wa Aozora	Avex io
2005	"Hatsukoi"	Club Morita	Hatsukoi	Pony
2006	"Thirties days"	September	25-Ji no Shara	Foa
2007	"Shiosai"	Youko Nagisa	Novella d'amore	Teichiku
2008	"Juujiro"	Chicken Garlic Steak	Air Acapella III	U-Can
2009	"Koisedomo Aisedomo", "Utsukushii Gokai"	Naoki Kawamoto	Koisedomo Aisedomo	Rise Music
2009	"Oyasumi"	Masayuki Suzuki	Still Gold	Epic
2009	"Tomodachi Mood"	Satomi Morimura	Idol Miracle Bible Series 80-86 Girls	Sony Music
2016	"Unbalance"	Minami Takahashi	Aishitemo Ii desuka?	Universal Music Japan
2017	all songs	V.A	One Week	Ten Years
2018	"Koiginu"	Satoshi Hayashibe	Koiginu	Avex trax
2021	"Sea Wind"	Mai Kuraki	Unconditional Love	Northern Music
2023	"Ashita no Peace"	KinKi Kids	P album	Johnny's
