= 25th Japan Record Awards =

1983 Japanese music awards ceremony

- Date: 31 December 1983
- Venue: Imperial Garden Theater, Tokyo
- Hosted by: Keizo Takahashi, Keiko Takeshita

Television/radio coverage
- Network: TBS

The 25th Japan Record Awards were given in a ceremony held on 31 December 1983. They recognized accomplishments by musicians from that year.

The audience rating was 32.7%. Takashi Hosokawa, who had won the grand prize in the 24th Japan Record Awards in 1982, won the grand prize again in the 25th Japan Record Awards in 1983. No singer had previously won the grand prize twice in two years.

== Award winners ==
- Japan Record Award:
  - Takashi Hosokawa for "Yagiri no Watashi"
- Best Vocalist:
  - Masako Mori
- Best New Artist:
  - The Good-Bye

== See also ==
- 1983 in Japanese music
