= Junichi Inagaki =

Japanese popular music singer (born 1953)

Junichi Inagaki 稲垣 潤一
- Born: July 9, 1953 (age 72); Sendai, Miyagi, Japan
- Genres: J-pop
- Occupation: Singer
- Instrument(s): Vocals drums
- Years active: 1982–present
- Labels: Toshiba EMI; Fun House/BMG Victor/BMG Japan; Teichiku Entertainment; Universal Music Japan
- Website: j-inagaki.com

Junichi Inagaki (Japanese: 稲垣 潤一, Hepburn: Inagaki Jun'ichi; born July 9, 1953) is a Japanese popular music singer.

== Biography ==
Inagaki was born and raised in Sendai, the capital of Miyagi Prefecture, and graduated from Miyagi Prefectural Technical High School. One of his earliest musical influences was Stevie Wonder. While a student in middle school, he joined a local band called Faces as a vocalist and drummer. Later, he also performed in bands that entertained United States military personnel stationed in Yokosuka and Tachikawa. Beginning with his commercial debut single "Rainy Regret" (雨のリグレット Ame no riguretto) in 1982, Inagaki released a series of popular hits.

Inagaki's music became especially well known throughout the 1980s and 1990s. His songs have appeared on several drama programs and numerous commercial advertisements on Japanese television. His 1992 ballad "When The Christmas Carols Play" (クリスマスキャロルの頃には Kurisumasu kyaroru no koro ni wa) was featured on the TBS drama series Homework (ホームワーク), and remains one of the most popular holiday songs in Japan.

As of 2010, Inagaki continues to tour in Japan, and performed in Tokyo, Osaka, and Nagoya in June 2010. In a rare performance abroad, he held a private concert in San Francisco sponsored by the Japanese Chamber of Commerce of Northern California on January 11, 2009.

Inagaki's first wife of more than 30 years died in 2006. He remarried in October 2007, and hosted a wedding reception in Tokyo for family and close friends in March 2008.

== Discography ==
=== Original studio albums ===
Year	Title	Release date
1982	246:3AM	July 21, 1982
1983	Shylights; Japan Record Award for one of the 10 Best Albums of 1983	February 1, 1983
1983	J.I.	September 1, 1983
1984	Personally	May 19, 1984
1985	No Strings	May 1, 1985
1986	Realistic; Japan Record Award for Outstanding Album	March 1, 1986
1987	Mind Note	March 4, 1987
1988	Edge of Time	April 25, 1988
1989	Heart & Soul	April 19, 1989
1990	Self Portrait	April 4, 1990
1991	Will	April 3, 1991
1992	Sketch of Heart	May 20, 1992
1993	For my Dearest	March 24, 1993
1994	Signs of Trust	April 6, 1994
1995	J's Dimension	June 14, 1995
1996	Primary	September 21, 1996
1997	V.O.Z.	November 21, 1997
2000	My One	June 21, 2000
2001	endless chain	November 21, 2001
2002	Junichi Inagaki	November 21, 2002
2011	Just For You... (たったひとりの君へ… Tatta hitori no kimi e)	April 20, 2011

=== Compilation and live albums ===
Year	Title	Release date
1983	J. Live	December 21, 1983
1985	Complete	August 22, 1985
1985	Ballad Selection/P.S. I Want to Give You A Hug (抱きしめたい Dakishimetai)	September 29, 1986
1988	16 Candles	December 1, 1988
1990	New Best Now Complete	September 27, 1990
1992	On Television	December 2, 1992
1998	Super Best Collection	September 30, 1998
1999	Super Best/Single Hits Collection	January 21, 1999
1999	Super Best/Album Favorite Collection	January 21, 1999
2001	Love Ballad Best Collection/P.S. I Want to Give You A Hug (抱きしめたい Dakishimetai)	August 22, 2001
2002	Love Beat Best Collection/Dramatic Rain (ドラマティック・レイン)	January 23, 2002
2002	Super Best Single Hits Collection; Released on DVD Audio only.	December 18, 2002
2003	Slow Songs (スロー ソングス)	November 26, 2003
2005	Complete Single Collection	December 16, 2005
2007	Rainy Voice 〜greatest hits & mellow pop〜	September 5, 2007
2009	Ballad Best (バラードベスト)	March 11, 2009

=== Cover and duet albums ===
Year	Title	Release date
1986	Another Page	July 2, 1986
1990	Ten	December 1, 1990
1996	Revival	December 4, 1996
1999	FM AOR	March 25, 1999
2004	Revival II	November 3, 2004
2005	Unchained Melody	December 23, 2005
2008	A Man and A Woman (男と女 Otoko to onna) Two Hearts Two Voices	November 19, 2008
2009	A Man and A Woman 2 (男と女2 Otoko to onna 2)	October 28, 2009
2009	A Man and A Woman 2 (男と女2 Otoko to onna 2) Special Edition	October 28, 2009
2010	A Man and A Woman 3 (男と女3 Otoko to onna 3)	September 29, 2010
2010	A Man and A Woman 3 (男と女3 Otoko to onna 3) Special Edition	September 29, 2010

=== Singles ===
Year	Title	Release date
1982	"Rainy Regret (雨のリグレット Ame no riguretto)"	January 21, 1982
1982	"246:3AM"	July 21, 1982
1982	"Dramatic Rain (ドラマティック・レイン)"	October 21, 1982
1983	"Escape (エスケイプ)"	March 1, 1983
1983	"Summer Horn (夏のクラクション Natsu no kurakushon)"	July 21, 1983
1983	"Long Version (ロング・バージョン)"	November 1, 1983
1983	"Ocean Blue (オーシャン・ブルー)"	April 28, 1984
1985	"Blue-Jean' Pierrot (ブルージン・ピエロ)"	March 21, 1985
1985	"Bachelor Girl (バチェラー・ガール)"	July 1, 1985
1986	"A Dozen Excuses (1ダースの言い訳 1 dāsu no iiwake)"	February 21, 1986
1987	"Thinking of the Beach Club (思い出のビーチクラブ Omoide no bīchikurabu)" TBS Japan Songwriting Award Grand Prize	April 22, 1987
1987	"A Ballad For You (君のためにバラードを Kimi no tame ni barādo wo)"	October 5, 1987
1988	"Southern Cross (サザンクロス)"	March 5, 1988
1988	"1-2-3"	July 25, 1988
1989	"Seventy Colors Girl (セブンティー・カラーズ・ガール)"	January 25, 1989
1989	"You Don't Know (君は知らない Kimi wa shiranai)"/ "An Afternoon With You (君に逢いたい午後 Kimi ni aitai gogo)"	May 25, 1989
1989	"Unrequited Love 1969 (1969の片想い 1969 no kataomoi)"	October 25, 1989
1990	"Shine On Me"	March 25, 1990
1990	"Honesty From The Heart (心からオネスティー Kokoro kara onesutī)"/ "The Closest Stranger (いちばん近い他人 Ichiban chikai tanin)"	June 1, 1990
1990	"They Don't Say Merry Christmas (メリークリスマスが言えない Merī kurisumasu ga ienai)"	November 1, 1990
1991	"Second Kiss/Rewind (セカンド・キス／リワインド)"	April 3, 1991
1991	"Farewell My Love (さらば愛しき人よ Saraba aishiki hito yo)"/"Congratulations"	June 26, 1991
1991	"They Don't Say Merry Christmas (メリークリスマスが言えない Merī kurisumasu ga ienai)" (Re-release)	November 1, 1991
1991	"A Dozen Excuses (1ダースの言い訳 1 dāsu no iiwake)"/"April" (Re-release)	December 21, 1991
1992	"You're Everything (あなたがすべて Anata ga subete)"	March 1, 1992
1992	"Only You in the World (世界でたったひとりの君に Sekai de tatta hitori no kimi ni)"	May 20, 1992
1992	"When The Christmas Carols Play (クリスマスキャロルの頃には Kurisumasu kyaroru no koro ni wa)" Japan Gold Disc Award, One of the Year's Five Best Singles	October 28, 1992
1993	"I'm Still Here (僕ならばここにいる Boku naraba koko ni iru)"	January 13, 1993
1993	"Marathon Race (マラソンレース)"	June 10, 1993
1993	"When The Christmas Carols Play (クリスマスキャロルの頃には Kurisumasu kyaroru no koro ni wa)"/ "They Don't Say Merry Christmas (メリークリスマスが言えない Merī kurisumasu ga ienai)" (Re-release)	November 26, 1993
1994	"After The Kiss (キスなら後にして Kisu nara ato ni shite)"	March 24, 1994
1994	"They Don't Say Merry Christmas (メリークリスマスが言えない Merī kurisumasu ga ienai)" (Remix version)/ "Eternal Kiss (永遠より長いキス Eien yori nagai kisu)"	November 26, 1994
1995	"Don't Talk (語らない Kataranai)"	May 25, 1995
1996	"Rainy Days, Windy Nights (雨の朝と風の夜に Ame no asa to kaze no yoru ni)"	August 21, 1996
1997	"Starting Over"	May 21, 1997
1997	"Endless Love Song (終わらないLOVE SONG Owaranai LOVE SONG)"	October 22, 1997
1998	"J's Love Song"	October 21, 1998
1999	"Small Miracle (小さな奇蹟 Chīsa na kiseki)"	October 21, 1999
2000	"The Way Your Eyes Look (君の瞳はそのままに Kimi no hitomi wa kono mama ni)"	February 23, 2000
2000	"They Don't Say Merry Christmas (メリークリスマスが言えない Merī kurisumasu ga ienai)" (Re-release)	November 21, 2000
2001	"Prayer"	October 24, 2001
2002	"On the Canary Islands (カナリア諸島にて Kanaria shotō ni te)"/ "Endless Chain-With You Time Flies (きみという時の流れよ Kimi to iu toki no nagare yo)"	February 27, 2002
2002	"Platinum Astronauts (プラチナ・アストロノーツ)"	June 26, 2002
2002	"Tokyo Elegy"	October 23, 2002
2007	"Grown-Up Summer Scene (大人の夏景色 Otona no natsu keshiki)"	July 4, 2007
2008	"A Message From Sayonara (サヨナラからのメッセージ Sayonara kara no messēji)"	February 6, 2008
2008	"Can't Stop The Sadness (悲しみがとまらない Kanashimi ga tomaranai)" Duet with Yuki Koyanagi. Cover version of song originally released by Anri in 1983.	November 5, 2008
2009	"When The Christmas Carols Play (クリスマスキャロルの頃には Kurisumasu kyaroru no koro ni wa)" Duet with Kohmi Hirose. Remake of song originally released by Inagaki in 1992.	November 18, 2009
2011	"The More I Think of It, The Sweeter It Gets (思い出す度 愛おしくなる Omoi dasu tabi ito oshiku naru)" Duet with Midori Karashima.	February 23, 2011
