= Mitsuo Hagita =

Mitsuo Hagita Mitsuo Hagita 萩田光雄
- Born: 萩田光男; June 16, 1946 (age 80); Shizuoka, Japan
- Genres: Kayōkyoku, Idol Kayōkyoku, New Music, Pop
- Occupations: arranger, composer, music producer
- Years active: 1973–present
- Website: http://www.face-music.co.jp/2_artist/hagita.htm

Mitsuo Hagita (萩田光雄, Hagita Mitsuo), born June 16, 1946, in Shizuoka, Japan, is a Japanese arranger, composer and musical producer.

== Biography ==
After graduating from the Keio University, he set his goal to be arranger and composer. In 1973, he made his debut as an arranger with the song "Hitoribocchi no Heya" by Masa Takagi. He won an award for Best Arrangement on the Japan Record Awards for two consecutive years - 1975 and 1976. Since 1976, he is member of the copyright collection society JASRAC and music association Japan Composers & Arrangers Association. On the same year, he released his first solo work Secret Love. In the span of 45 years of his career, he arranged over 4,000 songs. He is considered as one of the most renovated and representative music arranger in the Japanese music industry.

== Discography ==
=== Albums ===
==== Studio albums ====
| Title | Album details | Peak chart positions |
| Title | Album details | JPN Oricon |
|---|---|---|
| Secret Love | Released: 1976; Label: Tower to the people; Formats: LP, CD | - |

==== Compilation albums ====
| Title | Album details | Peak chart positions |
| Title | Album details | JPN Oricon |
|---|---|---|
| Oto no Majutsushi: Composer/Arranger Hagita Mitsuo no Sekai | Released: 2021; Label: GT Music; Formats: 5-CD | - |

== Works ==
=== Anime ===
- Wata no Kunihoshi (1984)
- Giant Gorg (1984)
- Record of Lodoss War (OVA, 1990)
- Mobile Suit Gundam 0083: Stardust Memory (OVA, 1991)
- Sakura Diaries (TV, 1997)

=== Movies ===
- Kaseki no Kouya (1982)
- Miyuki (1983)
- Haikara-San: Here Comes Miss Modern (1987)

== Songwriting credits ==
=== 1970s ===
Show more

List of songs written for other artists, showing year released and album name
| Year | Title | Artist(s) | Album/Single |
|---|---|---|---|
| 1977 | "Playback Part 2" | Momoe Yamaguchi | Playback Part 2 |

=== 1980s ===
Show more

List of songs written for other artists, showing year released and album name
| Year | Title | Artist(s) | Album/Single |
|---|---|---|---|
| 1987 | "Aki no Indication" | Yoko Minamino | Aki no Indication |

=== 1990s ===
Show more

List of songs written for other artists, showing year released and album name
| Year | Title | Artist(s) | Album/Single |
|---|---|---|---|
| 1996 | "Take me Higher" | V6 | Take me Higher |

=== 2000s-present ===
Show more

List of songs written for other artists, showing year released and album name
| Year | Title | Artist(s) | Album/Single |
|---|---|---|---|
| 2009 | "Fuyu Koihana" | Yukimi Hanasaki | Fuyu Koihana |

== Publications ==
=== Books ===
| Title | Author | Release | Publisher | ISBN |
|---|---|---|---|---|
| Nippon no Henkyokuka Kayoukyoku New Music Jidai wo sasaeta Arranger tachi (ニッポンの編曲家 歌謡曲／ニューミュージック時代を支えたアレンジャーたち) | collective author | 2016 | DU BOOKS | ISBN 978-4-907583-79-8 |
| Hit Kyoku no Ryourijin Sakkyokuka Hagita Mitsuo no Jidai (ヒット曲の料理人 編曲家萩田光雄の時代) | collective author | 2018 | Rittor Music | ISBN 978-4845632084 |
| Ongaku to Keiyaku Shita Otoko (音楽と契約した男): feature interview with Hagita | Ichizo Seo | 2020 | Yamaha Music Entertainment Holdings | ISBN 978-4636963052 |

=== Magazine ===
| Title | Author | Release | Publisher | ISBN |
|---|---|---|---|---|
| Hayashi Tetsuji Zen Shigoto (林哲司全仕事): features interview with Hagita | Tetsuji Hayashi | 2001 | Ongaku no Yuusha | ISBN 4-276-23715-7 |
