= Hiroaki Serizawa =

Japanese singer and songwriter

Hiroaki Serizawa (芹澤廣明 Serizawa Hiroaki January 3, 1948 - ) is a Japanese singer and songwriter. He has released albums under two other similar names: Hiro Serizawa (芹沢ヒロ and 芹沢 廣, both said Serizawa Hiro). He has released music for many Mitsuru Adachi anime series, including Touch and Hiatari Ryōkō!

In the 1980s he was a composer and producer for the group The Checkers.
