= Masao Urino =

Japanese screenwriter

Masao Urino 売野雅勇
- Born: 22 February 1951 (age 75); Ashikaga, Tochigi, Japan
- Other name: Reiji Asō (麻生麗二 Asō Reiji)
- Occupations: Songwriter and film director

Masao Urino (売野 雅勇, Urino Masao; born 22 February 1951 in Ashikaga, Tochigi Prefecture, Japan) is a Japanese lyricist, script writer, and film director. He has written lyrics for many musical groups and individual artists, sometimes under the pseudonym Reiji Asō (麻生 麗二, Asō Reiji).

After graduating from Tochigi Prefectural Ashikaga High School, he graduated in 1974 with a degree in literature from Sophia University. After graduating, he worked as a copy writer for the advertising firm Mannensha (萬年社), which went bankrupt in 1999. Due to missing an error in an advertisement in a national newspaper, though, he was forced to do other work. While working at Tōkyū Agency International (now Frontage), he made his lyricist debut with the 1981 Chanels song Hoshi Kuzu no Dance Hall.

In 1982, he had a big hit with the Akina Nakamori song Shōjo A. From there, he wrote the lyrics for a series of hit songs sung by Hiroaki Serizawa, and for the J-pop group The Checkers (Namida no Request). He has written lyrics for artists including Hidemi Ishikawa, Jun'ichi Inagaki, Daisuke Inoue, Hiromi Iwasaki, Yoshimi Iwasaki, Tomio Umezawa, Yukiko Okada, Yōko Oginome, Carlos Toshiki & Omega Tribe, Naoko Kawai, Yuri Kunizane, Masahiko Kondō, Kiyotaka Sugiyama, Tomomi Nishimura, Yū Hayami, Chiemi Hori, Junko Miyama, and others.

Urino made his directorial and script writing debut in 1990 with the film Cinderella Express.

== Works ==
Song title	Romanized title	Performed by	Date
夏のクラクション	Natsu no Klaxon	Junichi Inagaki	1983-07-21
シー･サイド･ショット	Seaside Shot	Junichi Inagaki	1983-07-21
Maria	Maria	Junichi Inagaki	1983-09-01
悲しきダイアモンドリング	Kanashiki Diamond Ring	Junichi Inagaki	1984-05-19
恋のプラネットサーカス	Koi no Planet Circus	Junichi Inagaki	1984-05-19
十戒 (1984)	Jukkai (1984)	Akina Nakamori	1984-07-25
ブルージン･ピエロ	Bruisin' Pierro	Junichi Inagaki	1985-03-21
優しさが瞳にしみる	Yasashisa ga Hitomi ni Shimeru	Junichi Inagaki	1985-03-21
水の星へ愛をこめて	Mizu no Hoshi e Ai wo Komete	Hiroko Moriguchi	1985-08-07
八月のジプシー	Hachigatsu no Gypsy	Hidemi Ishikawa	1985-08-25
Sea Loves You～キッスで殺して	Sea Loves You: Kiss de Koroshite	Hidemi Ishikawa	1985-08-25
赤いスピード・スター	Akai Speed Star	Hidemi Ishikawa	1985-12-18
哀しみのカーニバル	Kanashimi no Carnival	Hidemi Ishikawa	1985-12-18
サイレンの少年～遠くで抱きしめて～	Siren no Shōnen: Tōku de Dakishimete	Hidemi Ishikawa	1985-12-18
ウインター・リポート	Winter Report	Hidemi Ishikawa	1985-12-18
A Glass of the Sorrow	A Glass of the Sorrow	Junichi Inagaki	1986-03-01
Rain Glass	Rain Glass	Hidemi Ishikawa	1986-07-09
Shadow Summer	Shadow Summer	Hidemi Ishikawa	1986-07-09
六本木純情派	Roppongi Junjōha	Yōko Oginome	1986-10-29
湾岸太陽族	Wangan Taiyōzoku	Yōko Oginome	1987-03-03
思い出のビーチクラブ	Omoide no Peach Club	Junichi Inagaki	1987-03-04
さよならの果実たち	Sayonara no Kajitsutachi	Yōko Oginome	1987-06-21
素敵な勇気	Suteki na Yūki	Hidemi Ishikawa	1987-07-13
デス・トラップ	Death Trap	Hidemi Ishikawa	1987-10-14
北風のキャロル	Kitakaze no Carol	Yōko Oginome	1987-10-27
ストレンジャーtonight	Stranger Tonight	Yōko Oginome	1988-01-21
スターダスト・ドリーム	Stardust Dream	Yōko Oginome	1988-04-27
Memory Flickers	Memory Flickers	Junichi Inagaki	1989-01-25
ミスティー･ブルー	Misty Blue	Junichi Inagaki	1989-01-25
セブンティー･カラーズ･ガール	Seventy Colors Girl	Junichi Inagaki	1989-01-25
悲しみは優し過ぎて	Kanashimi wa Yasashisugite	Junichi Inagaki	1989-04-19
Misty Blue	Misty Blue	Junichi Inagaki	1989-04-19
湘南ハートブレイク	Shōnan Heartbreak	Yōko Oginome	1989-06-07
ユア・マイ・ライフ	You're My Life	Yōko Oginome	1989-09-27
Love Is Hard Business	Love Is Hard Business	Junichi Inagaki	1991-04-03
Truth	Truth	Junichi Inagaki	1991-04-03
Pretend	Pretend	Junichi Inagaki	1992-05-20
夜汽車よ悲しみを乗せて	Yogisha yo Kanashimi wo Nosete	Junichi Inagaki	1992-05-20
真夏の果てまで	Manatsu no Hate made	Junichi Inagaki	1996-08-21
夏が行くよ	Natsu ga Yuku yo	Junichi Inagaki	1996-08-21
