= 50th Anniversary Special A Tribute of Hayashi Tetsuji: Saudade =

2023 tribute album

Compilation album by Various Artists
- Released: November 8, 2023
- Recorded: 2023
- Genres: Kayōkyoku; city pop
- Language: Japanese
- Label: VAP

50th Anniversary Special A Tribute of Hayashi Tetsuji: Saudade is a tribute album consisting of songs written by Tetsuji Hayashi, released on November 8, 2023 by VAP. The album contains re-recorded and cover versions of some of Hayashi's hit songs written throughout his 5-decade career as a composer and songwriter.

== Background ==
On September 11, 2023, it was announced that a tribute album will be released to celebrate Hayashi's 50th anniversary in the music industry. Singers Akina Nakamori, Tomoyo Harada, Kiyotaka Sugiyama and Iyo Matsumoto, who previously worked with Hayashi, will be featured in the album with their re-recorded Hayashi-penned songs. While Junichi Inagaki, Shoko Nakagawa, Yu Sakai, Pii, Sumire Uesaka, GOOD BYE APRIL, Keizo Nakanishi and Yukino Matsuki will also provide their own covers. The album is set to release in 2 editions: a standard CD edition and a limited CD+DVD combo in which the DVD will contain a mix of video footages, including a live session, music videos and an interview. Further details regarding the release are yet to be announced.

== Promotion ==
Prior to the album's release, Hayashi held his 50th anniversary concert on November 5, 2023 at the Tokyo International Forum to promote the album. Some of the artists involved in the album also performed for the said concert. The announcement was made four days after announcing the album's release.

From October 19 to November 4, 2023, VAP uploaded teaser videos previewing the songs on their official YouTube channel. In addition, each of the artists have expressed their felicitations to Hayashi and shared their messages either recorded or written through an official statement. To further promote the album, two songs were released. On October 6, 2023, Pii released her cover of Mariya Takeuchi's 1979 single "September", and GOOD BYE APRIL's version of S. Kiyotaka & Omega Tribe's 1983 debut single "Summer Suspicion" which was released on October 25, 2023.

Included in the album is Nakamori's self-cover of her 1984 single "Kita Wing". The full version of the song was broadcast on selected radio stations in Japan on October 30, 2023. The said classical rendition is her first song released in six years since she had been on hiatus after the release of her albums Akina and Cage in 2017. During an interview on the making of the album, Hayashi didn't expected Nakamori to be part of the recording, thus, crediting the producers for the initiative.

== Commercial performance ==
The album debuted at number 7 on the Oricon Daily Album Chart.

== Track listing ==
No.	Title	Original Performer	Length
1.	"Kita Wing: Classic (北ウイング)" (cover by Nakamori)	Akina Nakamori^{[a]}	6:20
2.	"Kanashimi ga Tomaranai (悲しみがとまらない)" (cover by Junichi Inagaki and Yuki Koyanagi)	Anri	4:47
3.	"Summer Suspicion" (cover by GOOD BYE APRIL)	S. Kiyotaka & Omega Tribe	4:45
4.	"September" (covered by Pii)	Mariya Takeuchi	4:25
5.	"Dang Dang 気になる (Kininaru)" (cover by Sumire Uesaka)	Yuma Nakamura	3:55
6.	"Tengoku ni Ichiban Chikai Shima (天国にいちばん近い島) 2017" (cover by Harada)	Tomoyo Harada^{[a]}	6:31
7.	"Shinjikata wo Oshiete (信じかたを教えて)2022 New Vocal Version" (cover by Matsumoto)	Iyo Matsumoto^{[a]}	4:00
8.	"Sotsugyoushiki: Graduation (卒業)" (cover by Yukino Matsugi)	Momoko Kikuchi	3:47
9.	"Kanashii Iro yane (悲しい色やね)" (cover by Keizou Nakanishi)	Masaki Ueda	4:47
10.	"Glass no Palm Tree (ガラスのPALM TREE)" (cover by Shoko Nakagawa and Hyadain Drive)	S. Kiyotaka & Omega Tribe	4:30
11.	"Mayonaka no Door: Stay with Me (真夜中のドア)" (covered by Yu Sakai feat. Shingo Suzuki)	Miki Matsubara	4:53
12.	"Kanashimi ga Ippai (悲しみがいっぱい)" (covered by Kiyotaka Sugiyama)	Tetsuji Hayashi	4:29

Notes

- ^{^a} signifies an original performer who re-recorded the song
- Tracks 2, 6, 7 and 11 are excluded in the digital version release. Thus, its tracklist differs from the physical standard edition.
- "Kanashimi ga Tomaranai (悲しみがとまらない)" was originally covered and recorded in 2008 by Junichi Inagaki and Yuki Koyanagi for their album Otokoto Onna: Two Hearts Two Voices (男と女 -TWO HEARTS TWO VOICES-).
- "Tengoku ni Ichiban Chikai Shima (天国にいちばん近い島)" was originally re-recorded in 2017 by Tomoyo Harada for her album Ongaku To Watashi (音楽と私).
- "Shinjikata wo Oshiete (信じかたを教えて)" was originally re-recorded in 2022 by Iyo Matsumoto and was released as a single.
- "Mayonaka no Door: Stay with Me (真夜中のドア)" was originally covered and recorded in 2022 by Yu Sakai and Shingo Suzuki for Sakai's album City Pop Lovers.

== Charts ==
Chart (2023)	Peak position
Japanese Albums (Oricon) - Daily	7
Japanese Albums (Oricon) - Weekly	17

== Release history ==
Year	Format(s)	Serial number	Label(s)	Ref.
2023	CD; CD+DVD digital	VPCC-86471; VPCC-86470	VAP	
