= 1984 in Japanese music =

In 1984 (Shōwa 59), Japanese music was released on records and performed in concerts, and there were charts, awards, contests and festivals.

During that year, Japan continued to have the second largest music market in the world.

== Awards, contests and festivals ==
The 13th Tokyo Music Festival was held on 1 April 1984. The 26th Osaka International Festival (Japanese: 大阪国際フェスティバル) was held from 13 to 25 April 1984. The 27th Yamaha Popular Song Contest was held on 13 May 1984. The 28th Yamaha Popular Song Contest was held on 7 October 1984. The final of the 15th World Popular Song Festival was held on 28 October 1984. The final of the 13th FNS Music Festival was held on 18 December 1984. The 26th Japan Record Awards were held on 31 December 1984. The 35th NHK Kōhaku Uta Gassen was held on 31 December 1984.

The 33rd Otaka prize was won by Akira Miyoshi.

== Concerts ==
A Super Rock '84 concert was held in Seibu Stadium. The farewell concert of Saki Kubota was held at Kudan Kaikan in Tokyo on 26 November 1984.

== Number one singles ==
The following reached number 1 on the weekly Oricon Singles Chart:

Issue date	Song	Artist(s)
2 January	"Moshimo Ashita ga..."	Warabe
9 January	"Moshimo Ashita ga..."	Warabe
16 January	"Moshimo Ashita ga..."	Warabe
23 January	"Moshimo Ashita ga..."	Warabe
30 January	"Moshimo Ashita ga..."	Warabe
6 February	"Moshimo Ashita ga..."	Warabe
13 February	"Rock'n Rouge"	Seiko Matsuda
20 February	"Rock'n Rouge"	Seiko Matsuda
27 February	"Rock'n Rouge"	Seiko Matsuda
5 March	"Rock'n Rouge"	Seiko Matsuda
12 March	"Ichiban Yarō"	Masahiko Kondō
19 March	"Wine Red no Kokoro"	Anzen Chitai
26 March	"Wine Red no Kokoro"	Anzen Chitai
2 April	"Nagisa no Haikara Ningyo / Kaze no Magical"	Kyōko Koizumi
9 April	"Katsu!"	Shibugakitai
16 April	"Katsu!"	Shibugakitai
23 April	"Southern Wind"	Akina Nakamori
30 April	"Southern Wind"	Akina Nakamori
7 May	"Southern Wind"	Akina Nakamori
14 May	"Kanashikute Jealousy"	The Checkers
21 May	"Jikan no Kuni no Alice / Natsu Fuku no Eve"	Seiko Matsuda
28 May	"Jikan no Kuni no Alice / Natsu Fuku no Eve"	Seiko Matsuda
4 June	"Kishidō"	Toshihiko Tahara
11 June	"Kishidō"	Toshihiko Tahara
18 June	"Kejime Nasai"	Masahiko Kondō
25 June	"Kejime Nasai"	Masahiko Kondō
2 July	"Meikyū no Andorōra / Dunk"	Kyōko Koizumi
9 July	"Meikyū no Andorōra / Dunk"	Kyōko Koizumi
16 July	"Amaoto wa Chopin no Shirabe"	Asami Kobayashi
23 July	"Amaoto wa Chopin no Shirabe"	Asami Kobayashi
30 July	"Amaoto wa Chopin no Shirabe"	Asami Kobayashi
6 August	"Jukkai (1984)"	Akina Nakamori
13 August	"Pink no Mozart"	Seiko Matsuda
20 August	"Ao ni Kaita Ren'ai Shōsetsu"	Toshihiko Tahara
27 August	"Jukkai (1984)"	Akina Nakamori
3 September	"Hoshikuzu no Stage"	The Checkers
10 September	"Hoshikuzu no Stage"	The Checkers
17 September	"Hoshikuzu no Stage"	The Checkers
24 September	"Eien ni Himitsu sa" (永遠に秘密さ)	Masahiko Kondō
1 October	"Yamato Nadeshiko Shichi Henge"	Kyōko Koizumi
8 October	"Yamato Nadeshiko Shichi Henge"	Kyōko Koizumi
15 October	"Yamato Nadeshiko Shichi Henge"	Kyōko Koizumi
22 October	"Tengoku ni Ichiban Chikai Shima"	Tomoyo Harada
29 October	"Koibito-tachi no Pavement"	The Alfee
5 November	"Woman "W no Higeki" Yori"	Hiroko Yakushimaru
12 November	"Heart no Earring"	Seiko Matsuda
19 November	"Heart no Earring"	Seiko Matsuda
26 November	"Kazari ja Nai no yo Namida wa"	Akina Nakamori
3 December	"Julia ni Shōshin"	The Checkers
10 December	"Julia ni Shōshin"	The Checkers
17 December	"Julia ni Shōshin"	The Checkers
24 December	"Julia ni Shōshin"	The Checkers
31 December	"The Stardust Memory"	Kyōko Koizumi

== Number one albums and LPs ==
Music Labo

The following reached number 1 on the Music Labo chart:

- 9 January: Canary - Seiko Matsuda
- 16 January, 23 January, 30 January and 6 February: Best Akina Memoires - Akina Nakamori
- 13 February and 20 February: Timely!! - Anri
- 27 February and 5 March: Kokinshū - Hiroko Yakushimaru
- 12 March, 19 March, 26 March, 30 April and 7 May: Thriller - Michael Jackson
- 2 April, 9 April, 16 April, 23 April: Each Time - Eiichi Ohtaki
- 14 May, 21 May and 28 May: Anniversary - Akina Nakamori
- 4 June and 11 June: Visitors - Motoharu Sano
- 18 June, 19 June and 25 June: Tinker Bell - Seiko Matsuda
- 2 July and 9 July: The Best Year of My Life - Off Course
- 16 July and 23 September: Ninkimono De Ikou - Southern All Stars
- 1 October: Ocean Side - Momoko Kikuchi
- 8 October: Triad - Mariko Takahashi
- 15 October: La Vie En Rose - Kōji Kikkawa
- 22 October and 29 October: Possibility - Akina Nakamori
- 5 November: Hajimemashite - Miyuki Nakajima
- 12 November, 19 November and 26 November: Seiko Town - Seiko Matsuda
- 3 December: Make It Big - Wham!
- 10 December: No Side - Yumi Matsutoya
- 17 December: Motto Checkers - Checkers
- 24 December: Windy Shadow - Seiko Matsuda
- 31 December: 9.5 Carats - Yōsui Inoue

Oricon

The following reached number 1 on the Oricon LP chart:

- 9 January, 16 January, 23 January and 30 January: Best Akina Memoires - Akina Nakamori
- 6 February, 13 February and 20 February: Timely!! - Anri
- 27 February and 5 March: Kokinshū - Hiroko Yakushimaru
- 12 March, 19 March, 23 April and 30 April: Thriller - Michael Jackson
- 26 March: Touch Me, Seiko - Seiko Matsuda
- 2 April, 9 April and 16 April: Each Time - Eiichi Ohtaki
- 7 May: Variety - Mariya Takeuchi
- 14 May, 21 May and 28 May: Anniversary - Akina Nakamori
- 4 June and 11 June: Visitors - Motoharu Sano
- 18 June and 25 June: Tinker Bell - Seiko Matsuda
- 10 September: Footloose: Original Soundtrack

== Annual charts ==
The highest selling record was Warabe's Moshimo Ashita ga... which was number 1 in the Oricon annual singles chart.

Akina Nakamori was number 1 on the Music Labo top pop album artist chart. Checkers were number 1 on the Music Labo top pop singles artist chart.

== Film and television ==
The music of MacArthur's Children (1984), by Shin'ichirō Ikebe, won the 39th Mainichi Film Award for Best Music and the 8th Japan Academy Film Prize for Best Music (awarded in 1985). The music of Nausicaä of the Valley of the Wind is by Joe Hisaishi. The music of The Return of Godzilla is by Reijiro Koroku. The music of Macross: Do You Remember Love? is by Kentarō Haneda, and includes the song Ai Oboete Imasu ka by Mari Iijima. Big Wave, the soundtrack album of the film "Big Wave", is by Tatsuro Yamashita. The soundtrack of Urusei Yatsura includes "Chance On Love" by Cindy (Mayumi Yamamoto: 山本真裕美). Saint Four appeared in The Audition.

The thousandth episode of Music Fair was broadcast on 1 April 1984.

== Classical music ==
The Saito Kinen Orchestra was founded.

== Debuts ==
- Yōko Nagayama
- Youki Kudoh released her debut single "Yasei Jidai" (野生時代)

== Other singles released ==
- Kita Wing by Akina Nakamori
- Otomodachi and Pianissimo De... by Saki Kubota
- Tsugunai by Teresa Teng
- Kimi no Heart wa Marine Blue by S. Kiyotaka & Omega Tribe
- Mirai Kōkai (Sailing), Sayonara kara Hajimaru Monogatari and December Memory by Yōko Oginome
- Ora Tōkyō sa Iguda by Yoshi Ikuzō
- Never by Mie
- Crazy Night by Loudness
- 16 May: Mein Tēma - Hiroko Yakushimaru
- 5 November: Hero: Holding Out for a Hero by Miki Asakura.

== Other albums released ==
- Silent Love by Akina Nakamori
- Suspense by Pink Lady
- Never by Mie
- After Service by Yellow Magic Orchestra
- S-F-X by Haruomi Hosono
- Yoruno Sokowa Yawarakana Maboroshi by Saki Kubota
- Teens Romance by Yōko Oginome
- Misty Lady by Mari Hamada
- The Soundgraphy and Down Upbeat by Casiopea
- Another Game and Scuba by P-Model
- Disillusion by Loudness
- Adventures and Stars and the Moon by T-Square
- Natsu Zen Kai by Masayoshi Takanaka

== History ==
On 14 May 1984, the Checkers had three songs in the top ten of the Oricon singles chart.

== See also ==
- Timeline of Japanese music
- 1984 in Japan
- 1984 in music
- w:ja:1984年の音楽
