= Kita Wing =

Single by Akina Nakamori

from the album Anniversary
- Language: Japanese
- English title: North Wing
- B-side: Namida no Katachi no Earring (First release); Refrain (Second release)
- Released: January 1, 1984 (First release); December 15, 1984 (Second release)
- Recorded: 1983
- Genre: J-pop; kayōkyoku
- Length: 4:39
- Label: Reprise Records
- Composer: Tetsuji Hayashi
- Lyricist: Chinfa Kan
- Producer: Yūzō Shimada

Akina Nakamori singles chronology
"Kinku" (1983)	"Kita Wing" (1984)	"Southern Wind" (1984)

Music videos
- "Kita Wing" (Live) on YouTube

"Kita Wing" (北ウイング, Kita Uingu; lit. "North Wing") is the seventh single by Japanese entertainer Akina Nakamori. Written by Chinfa Kan and Tetsuji Hayashi, the single was released on January 1, 1984, by Warner Pioneer through the Reprise label. It was also the lead single from her fifth studio album Anniversary.

== Background ==
Nakamori approached songwriters Kan and Hayashi after listening to S. Kiyotaka & Omega Tribe's 1983 single "Summer Suspicion". During the songwriting process, proposed titles included "Midnight Flight" (ミッドナイトフライト, Middonaito Furaito) and "Yakan Hikō" (夜間飛行; lit. "Night Flight") before Nakamori settled with "Kita Wing", which she revealed was influenced by Yumi Matsutoya's "Chuo Freeway" (中央フリーウェイ, Chūō Furīuei). "Kita Wing" refers to the North Wing of Narita International Airport's Terminal 1, with the lyrics referencing Japan Airlines Flight 401 flying to London Heathrow Airport via Anchorage.

Nakamori, Kan, and Hayashi collaborated again on a sequel song titled "Dramatic Airport (Kita Wing Part II)" (ドラマティック・エアポート -北ウイング Part II-), which was featured on Nakamori's sixth studio album Possibility.

Nakamori has re-recorded "Kita Wing" for the 2002 self-cover compilation Utahime Double Decade and the 2006 compilation Best Finger 25th Anniversary Selection. In 2010, she re-recorded the song for the pachinko machine CR Nakamori Akina: Utahime Densetsu ~Koi Moni Dome nara~ (CR中森明菜・歌姫伝説〜恋も二度目なら〜; CR Akina Nakamori: Utahime Legend ~If Love Is For the Second Time~). She re-recorded the song for the third time in 2023 as part of Tetsuji Hayashi's tribute album 50th Anniversary Special A Tribute of Hayashi Tetsuji: Saudade with the subtitle Classic. This marks the first time in six years since her hiatus that she released new music.

== Chart performance ==
"Kita Wing" peaked at No. 2 on Oricon's weekly singles chart and sold over 614,200 copies.

== Track listing ==
All lyrics are written by Chinfa Kan, except where indicated; all music is composed and arranged by Tetsuji Hayashi, except where indicated.

Original release
No.	Title	Length
1.	"Kita Wing" (Kita Uingu (北ウイング; "North Wing"))	4:39
2.	"Namida no Katachi no Earring" (Namida no Katachi no Iyaringu (涙の形のイヤリング; "Teardrop-shaped Earrings"))	4:28
Total length:		9:07

Second release
No.	Title	Lyrics	Music	Arrangement	Length
1.	"Kita Wing"				4:39
2.	"Refrain" (Ri-fu-re-i-n (リ・フ・レ・イ・ン))	Gorō Matsui	Ryō Matsuda	Mitsuo Hagita	4:57
Total length:					9:36

1998 reissue bonus track
No.	Title	Length
3.	"Kita Wing (Live Version)" ((北ウイング(LIVE VERSION)))

== Charts ==
Chart (1984)	Peak position
Japan (Oricon)	2

== Cover versions ==
- Kream covered the song on their 1996 album Time Machine ni Onegai.
- Chinephile covered the song on their 2003 cover album Kayomania.
- Akiko Matsumoto covered the song on her 2013 compilation album King of Pops 2.
- Penicillin covered the song as the B-side of their 2014 single Sol.
- Mami Ayukawa covered the song on her 2014 album 1984.
- Sora Amamiya covered the song on her 2021 cover album Covers: Sora Amamiya Favorite Songs.
- Yo Hitoto covered the song in Nakamori's 2025 tribute album "Nakamori Akina Tribute Album: Meikyo".

== Release history ==
Year	Format(s)	Serial number	Label(s)	Ref.
1984	7inch LP	L-1663	Warner Pioneer	
1988	8 cm CD, CT	10SL-136, 10L5-4046	Warner Pioneer	
1998	12 cm CD	WPC6-8664	Warner Pioneer	
2008	Digital download	-	Warner Pioneer	
2014	Digital download - remaster	-	Warner Pioneer	

== See also ==
- 1984 in Japanese music
