= Possibility (album) =

Studio album by Akina Nakamori
- Released: 10 October 1984
- Recorded: 1984
- Studio: Aoi Studio; Cherry Island Studio
- Genre: Idol kayokyoku, pop
- Length: 40:43
- Language: Japanese
- Label: Warner Pioneer
- Producer: Yuuzou Shimada

Akina Nakamori chronology
Anniversary (1984)	Possibility (1984)	Silent Love (1985)

Singles from Possibility
- 1. "Southern Wind" Released: 11 April 1984; 2. "Jukkai (1984)" Released: 25 July 1984

Possibility is the sixth studio album by Japanese singer Akina Nakamori. It was released on 10 October 1984 under the Warner Pioneer label. The album includes the hit singles "Jukkai (1984)" and "Southern Wind", as well as the continuation of single Kita Wing - Dramatic Airport.

== Background ==
Possibility is the second studio album released in 1984, five months after the previous studio album Anniversary.

The music production team consist of a long-term collaborators from Nakamori's debut times, such as a Mitsuo Hagita, siblings Etsuko and Takao Kisugi, Gorō Matsui, Kōji Tamaki (member of Anzen Chitai), Tetsuji Hayashi and Ryou Matsuda.

Album track Dramatic Airport (Kita Wing part 2) is the sequel track to the single Kita Wing, which was released in January 1984.

== Promotion ==
=== Single ===
"Southern Wind" was released on 11 April 1984, her second single in 1984. The single debuted at number one on the Oricon Single Weekly Chart and became the tenth best-selling single of 1984. In The Best Ten ranking, it debuted at number one and stayed at number 14 in the yearly chart.

It received four awards: Pop Award in the 5th Megapolis Kayousai, Star Award (for first half year) in the 17th International Japan Cable Broadcasting Award, special award from the Yomiuri television and First-half Wired Grand Prize in the 17th Japan Cable Awards.

"Jukkai (1984)" was released on 25 July 1985, her third and final single of 1984. The single debuted at number one on the Oricon Single Weekly Chart and became the sixth best-selling single of 1984. In The Best Ten ranking, it debuted at number one and stayed at number eight in the yearly chart. In the Top Ten rankings, the single debuted at number one and stayed at number six in the yearly chart.

It received multiple awards: Grand Prix in the 10th Nippon Television Music Festival, Yokohama Music Award in the 11th Yokohama Music Festival, Golden Grandprix in International Music Festival from TV Asahi, Best Broadcast Music Award in the 15th Japan Kayou Awards, Most Requested Singer Award in the 17th Japan Cable Award and Kayo Music Award in the 13th FNS Music Festival.

On 15 December 1984, "Kita Wing" was released in a special single edition Kita Wing/Refrain.

== Stage performances ==
On the Fuji TV music television program Yoru no Hit Studio Jukkai four times. In the TBS television program The Best Ten, she performed Southern Wind and Jukkai regularly in year 1984.

Dramatic Airport, Blue Misty Rain and October Storm has been performed in the live tour Bitter and Sweet in 1985.

Southern Wind was performed not very often unlike successor single: it has been performed in Bitter and Sweet in 1985, Light and Shade in 1986, Akina Index: The 8th Anniversary in 1989, Akina Yume Special Live in 1991, Music Fiesta Tour in 2002, A-1 Tour in 2004 and Empress at CLUBeX Special Live in 2005.

Jukkai is a well-known performed single in the live tours and dinner shows: it has been performed in Bitter and Sweet in 1985, Light and Shade in 1986, Akina Index: The 8th Anniversary in 1989, Akina Yume Special Live in 1991, Symphonic Concert in 1998, ALL ABOUT AKINA 20th Anniversary in 2000, Music Fiesta Tour in 2002 and A-1 Tour in 2004.

== Chart performance ==
The album reached number one on the Oricon Album Weekly Chart for two consecutive weeks, selling over 629,200 copies. The album was ranked at number 18 on the Oricon Album Yearly Chart in 1984.

== Track listing ==
No.	Title	Lyrics	Music	Arranger(s)	Length
1.	"Southern Wind"	Etsuko Kisugi	Kōji Tamaki	Ichizō Seo	3:52
2.	"Aki wa Pastel Touch"	E. Kisugi	Masayoshi Takanaka	Takanaka; Seo	4:08
3.	"October Storm"	Chinfa Kan	Tetsuji Hayashi	Mitsuo Hagita	3:34
4.	"Refrain"	Gorō Matsui	Ryo Matsuda	Hagita	4:58
5.	"Horizon"	E. Kisugi	Takao Kisugi	Hagita	4:20
6.	"Aishū no Midnight"	Masako Arikawa	Tamaki	Hagita	4:35
7.	"Jukkai (1984)"	Masao Urino	Takanaka	Takanaka; Hagita	3:36
8.	"Shiroi Labyrinth"	E. Kisugi	T. Kisugi	Hagita	4:17
9.	"Blue Misty Rain"	Arikawa	Matsuda	Hagita	3:43
10.	"Dramatic Airport (Kita Wing Part II)"	Kan	Hayashi	Hagita	4:12

2022 remaster issue
No.	Title	Lyrics	Music	Arranger(s)	Length
11.	"Yume Haruka"	Mayo Shouno	Masami Koizumi	Hagita	3:47
12.	"Korekara Naturally"	SEYMOUR	Noboru Mimuro	Kei Wakakusa	4:27

== Covers ==
=== Southern Wind ===
- Hong Kong singer Alan Tam covered Southern Wind in Chinese, was included in the cover album Magic Cover released in 1984 under Polygram Records.

=== Jukkai ===
- Jacky Cheung recorded a Cantonese version of the song titled "Guk Ngoi Yan" (局外人; "Foreigner") in his 1985 album Smile.
- Maika Misaki covered the song in her 2012 album 10 Carat.
- Romi Park covered the song in her 2013 compilation single "Twinkle Voice ~Goe no Okuri mono~".
- Noriko Shiina covered the song in her 2013 compilation single "King of Pops".
- Aural Vampire covered the song in their 2015 EP "Mimic Your Hairstyle".

=== Shiroi Labyrinth ===
- Japanese singer-songwriter, Takao Kisugi covered song in his solo single under same title and later included on the album Labyrinth in 1984.

== Release history ==
Year	Format(s)	Serial number	Label(s)	Ref.
1984	LP, CT, CD	L-12592, LKF-8092, 35XL-47	Warner Pioneer	
1985	CD	32XL-105	Warner Pioneer	
1991	CD	WPCL-416	Warner Pioneer	
1996	CD	WPC6-8187	Warner Pioneer	
2006	CD, digital download	WPCL-10282	Warner Pioneer	
2012	Super Audio CD, CD hybrid	WPCL-11140	Warner Pioneer	
2014	CD	WPCL-11727	Warner Pioneer	
2018	LP	WPJL-10089	Warner Pioneer	
2022	2CD	WPCL-13440/1	Warner Pioneer	

Notes:

- 2006 re-release includes 24-bit digitally remastered sound source
- 2012 and 2014 re-release includes subtitles in the tracks "2012 remaster"
- 2022 re-release includes lacquer remaster which includes subtitles in the tracks "2022 lacquer remaster" along with original karaoke version of the tracks

== See also ==
- 1984 in Japanese music
