= Kimi no Heart wa Marine Blue =

1984 single by S. Kiyotaka & Omega Tribe

Single by S. Kiyotaka & Omega Tribe

from the album River's Island
- B-side: Ai o Maki Modoshite (愛を巻き戻して)
- Released: January 21, 1984
- Genre: City pop; album-oriented rock
- Length: 4:52
- Label: VAP
- Composer: Tetsuji Hayashi
- Lyricist: Chinfa Kan
- Producer: Koichi Fujita

S. Kiyotaka & Omega Tribe singles chronology
"Asphalt Lady" (1983)	"Kimi no Heart wa Marine Blue" (1984)	"Riverside Hotel" (1984)

"Kimi no Heart wa Marine Blue" (Japanese: 君のハートはマリンブルー, Hepburn: Kimi no Hāto wa Marinburū) is a single by Japanese band S. Kiyotaka & Omega Tribe released by VAP on January 21, 1984. Produced by Koichi Fujita and written by Tetsuji Hayashi and Chinfa Kan, the song helped the band be "properly recognized as [a band]" after the poor sales of the band's previous single, "Asphalt Lady". It peaked at 12th place on the Oricon Singles Chart.

== Background ==
After the poor sales of the band's previous single, "Asphalt Lady", the production team refocused their efforts on better compositions for future songs including "Kimi no Heart wa Marine Blue". Fujita composed a "sorrowful sound" as well as leaning into the image of the sea that was present in their debut single, "Summer Suspicion".

While recording, Fujita made vocalist Kiyotaka Sugiyama do multiple takes and gave detailed criticisms for every vocal take, telling Sugiyama to "paint a picture" in his head and "be the hero of the story" while singing.

== Commercial performance ==
The single peaked at 12th place on the Oricon Singles Chart and was ranked at 45th place on Oricon's year-end chart. Although never entering the top 10 on the Oricon charts, the song was featured on the shows The Top Ten (ザ・トップテン) and The Best Ten (ザ・ベストテン); it peaked at 14th place on The Best Ten before going down to 39th place in the second half of 1984 while it reached 7th place on The Top Ten. Spending 23 weeks on the Oricon charts, the single helped the band's sophomore album, River's Island, double its sales from the previous album, Aqua City.

== Performances and other usage ==
The song was used as the theme song for the TBS show Toshigoro Kazoku (年ごろ家族), starring Ken Utsui and running from January 10, 1984, to March 27, 1984. The song made its debut on the Fuji TV show Yoru no Hit Studio (夜のヒットスタジオ) on April 9, 1984. The song is one of Sugiyama's most self-covered songs during live performances after becoming a solo artist.

== Track listing ==
Single
No.	Title	Lyrics	Music	Arrangement	Length
1.	"Kimi no Heart wa Marine Blue (君のハートはマリンブルー)"	Chinfa Kan	Tetsuji Hayashi	Hayashi	4:52
2.	"Ai o Maki Modoshite (愛を巻き戻して)"	Yasushi Akimoto	Kiyotaka Sugiyama	Ken Shiguma	4:10

== Charts ==
=== Weekly charts ===
Chart (1984)	Peak position
Oricon Singles Chart	12

=== Year-end charts ===
Chart (1984)	Peak position
Oricon	45

== See also ==
- 1984 in Japanese music
