= Jukkai (1984) =

Single by Akina Nakamori

from the album Possibility
- Language: Japanese
- English title: Ten Commandments (1984)
- B-side: "Kore kara Naturally"
- Released: July 25, 1984
- Recorded: 1984
- Studio: Aoi Studio; Cherry Island Studio; Warner-Pioneer Studios
- Genre: J-pop; pop rock; kayōkyoku
- Length: 3:36
- Label: Reprise Records
- Composer: Masayoshi Takanaka
- Lyricist: Masao Urino
- Producer: Yūzō Shimada

Akina Nakamori singles chronology
"Southern Wind" (1984)	"Jukkai (1984)" (1984)	"Kazari ja Nai no yo Namida wa" (1984)

Music videos
- "Jukkai (1984)" (Live) on YouTube

"Jukkai (1984)" (十戒 (1984), Jukkai Ichi Kyū Hachi Yon; lit. "Ten Commandments (1984)") is the ninth single by Japanese entertainer Akina Nakamori. Written by Masao Urino and Masayoshi Takanaka, the single was released on July 25, 1984 by Warner Pioneer through the Reprise label. It was also the second single from her sixth studio album Possibility.

== Background ==
The B-side "Kore kara Naturally" was featured in the compilation albums Complete Single Collection: First Ten Years and Mou Hitori no Akina.

Earlier live and TV performances of the song were known for Nakamori's black outfit and backwards bend.

Nakamori performed the song on the 35th Kōhaku Uta Gassen, making her second appearance on NHK's New Year's Eve special.

Nakamori has re-recorded "Jukkai (1984)" for the 2006 compilation Best Finger 25th Anniversary Selection. In 2010, she re-recorded the song for the pachinko machine CR Nakamori Akina: Utahime Densetsu ~Koi Moni Dome nara~ (CR中森明菜・歌姫伝説〜恋も二度目なら〜; CR Akina Nakamori: Utahime Legend ~If Love Is For the Second Time~).

== Chart performance ==
"Jukkai (1984)" sold 611,500 copies and became Nakamori's fifth No. 1 hit on Oricon's singles chart and was ranked No. 6 in Oricon's 1984 year-ending chart. It also hit No. 1 on The Best Ten's singles chart and landed on No. 8 on The Best Ten's 1984 year-ending chart.

== Awards ==
The song earned Nakamori her first Grand Prix at the Nippon Television Music Festival in 1984.

== Track listing ==
Original release
No.	Title	Lyrics	Music	Arrangement	Length
1.	"Jukkai (1984)" ((十戒 (1984); "Ten Commandments (1984)"))	Masao Urino	Masayoshi Takanaka	Takanaka; Mitsuo Hagita	3:36
2.	"Kore kara Naturally" ((これからNaturally; "Naturally from Now On"))	Seymour	Noboru Mimuro	Kei Wakakusa	4:27
Total length:					8:03

1998 reissue bonus track
No.	Title	Lyrics	Music	Arrangement	Length
3.	"Jukkai (1984) (Live Version)" ((十戒（1984）(LIVE VERSION); "Ten Commandments (1984) (Live Version)"))	Urino	Takanaka	Takanaka; Hagita

== Charts ==
=== Weekly charts ===
Chart (1984)	Peak position
Japan (Oricon)	1
Japan (The Best Ten)	1
Japan (The Top Ten)	1

=== Year-end charts ===
Chart (1984)	Position
Japan (Oricon)	6
Japan (The Best Ten)	8
Japan (The Top Ten)	6

== Personnel ==
- Akina Nakamori – vocals
- Masayoshi Takanaka – guitar, keyboard, synthesizer
- Ken Yajima – guitar
- Haruo Togashi – keyboard
- Joe Strings – string orchestra
- Eve – backing vocals

== Cover versions ==
- Jacky Cheung recorded a Cantonese version of the song titled "Guk Ngoi Yan" (局外人; "Foreigner") in his 1985 album Smile.
- Maika Misaki covered the song in her 2012 album 10 Carat.
- Romi Park covered the song in her 2013 compilation single "Twinkle Voice ~Goe no Okuri mono~".
- Noriko Shiina covered the song in her 2013 compilation single "King of Pops".
- Aural Vampire covered the song in their 2015 EP "Mimic Your Hairstyle".
- Ado covered the song in Nakamori's 2025 tribute album "Nakamori Akina Tribute Album: Meikyo".

== Release history ==
Year	Format(s)	Serial number	Label(s)	Ref.
1984	7inch LP	L-1665	Warner Pioneer	
1988	8cm CD, CT	10SL-138, 10L5-4048	Warner Pioneer	
1998	12cm CD	WPC6-8666	Warner Pioneer	
2008	Digital download	-	Warner Pioneer	
2014	Digital download - remaster	-	Warner Pioneer	

== See also ==
- 1984 in Japanese music
