= Anniversary (Akina Nakamori album) =

Studio album by Akina Nakamori
- Released: 1 May 1984
- Recorded: 1984
- Studio: Aoi Studio; Cherry Island Studio; Compass Point Studios
- Genre: Idol Kayokyoku
- Length: 44:41
- Language: Japanese
- Label: Warner Pioneer; Reprise Records
- Producer: Yuuzou Shimada

Akina Nakamori chronology
| Best Akina Memoires (1983) | Anniversary (1984) | Possibility (1984) |

Singles from Anniversary
- 1. "Kita Wing" Released: 1 January 1984

Anniversary is the fifth studio album by Japanese singer Akina Nakamori. It was released on 1 May 1984 under the Warner Pioneer label. It was released on her second debut anniversary. The album includes the hit singles "Kita Wing" and first song written by Akina herself, Yume wo Misasete.

== Background ==
Anniversary is the first studio album released in 1984.

The music production team consist of a long-term collaborators from Nakamori's debut times, such as a Mitsuo Hagita, siblings Etsuko and Takao Kisugi, Amii Ozaki, Kōji Tamaki (a future member of Anzen Chitai), Yoshiko Miura and Haruomi Hosono.

Unlike previous album New Akina Etranger, which had heavy influence of later's Momoe Yamaguchi music production team and European-oriented album style, Anniversary has more summer and tropical style according to interview from the magazine The Television.

== Promotion ==
=== Single ===
"Kita Wing" was released on 1 January 1984, her first single in 1984. The single debuted at number two on the Oricon Single Weekly Chart and became the ninth best-selling single of 1984. In The Best Ten ranking, it debuted at number one and stayed at number 11 in the yearly chart.

It received three rewards: special composition award in the 4th Japan Composition Award, Best Hit Award in the 13th FNS Music Festival and Best Singing Award in the 26th Japan Record Awards.

On 15 December 1984, "Kita Wing" was released as a special edition Kita Wing/Refrain.

== Stage performances ==
In the TBS television program The Best Ten, she performed Kita Wing five times.

Most of the songs have been performed on the live tour Ongaku Kanshō-kai: Aitaina Aerukana, such as "Easy", "Asylum", "Shut Out", "100 Celsius Vacation", "Natsu Basama", "Yume wo Misasete" and "Melancholy Fiesta".

"Kita Wing" was performed in Bitter and Sweet in 1985, Akina Index: The 8th Anniversary in 1989, Akina Yume Special Live in 1991, Symphonic Concert in 1998 and AKINA NAKAMORI A-1 tour in 2004.

"Mabushii Futari" was performed in the Akina's first dinner show Xmas An evening with Miss Akina Nakamori in 1996.

"Asylum" was performed in the Akina Yume Special Live in 1991 and in the special cover live Empress at CLUB EX in 2005.

== Chart performance ==
The album reached number one on the Oricon Album Weekly Chart for three consecutive weeks, charted 21 weeks and selling over 483,400 copies. The album was ranked at number 13 on the Oricon Album Yearly Chart in 1984.

== Track listing ==
| No. | Title | Lyrics | Music | Arranger(s) | Length |
|---|---|---|---|---|---|
| 1. | "Asylum" | Yoshiko Miura | Kōji Tamaki | Ichizou Seo | 4:03 |
| 2. | "Mabushii Futari de" | Etsuko Kisugi | Takao Kisugi | Kei Wakakusa | 5:01 |
| 3. | "Easy" | Amii Ozaki | Ozaki | Seo | 4:07 |
| 4. | "Yume wo Misasete" | Akina Nakamori | J. Smith | Wakakusa | 4:33 |
| 5. | "Kita Wing" | Chinfa Kan | Tetsuji Hayashi | Hayashi | 4:39 |
| 6. | "100°C Vacance" | Masao Urino | Haruomi Hosono | Seo | 4:25 |
| 7. | "Natsu Hazama" | E. Kisugi | T. Kisugi | Seo | 4:47 |
| 8. | "Melancholy Fiesta" | E. Kisugi | Juichi Sase | Mitsuo Hagita | 3:31 |
| 9. | "Ballerina" | Ozaki | Ozaki | Wakakusa | 3:43 |
| 10. | "Shut Out" | Masako Arikawa | Wataru Kuniyasu | Wakakusa | 4:12 |

2022 remaster reissue
| No. | Title | Lyrics | Music | Arranger(s) | Length |
|---|---|---|---|---|---|
| 1. | "Namida no Katachi no Earring" | Kan | Hayashi | Hayashi | 4:28 |

== Covers ==
=== Kita Wing ===
- Kream covered the song on their 1996 album Time Machine ni Onegai.
- Chinephile covered the song on their 2003 cover album Kayomania.
- Akiko Matsumoto covered the song on her 2013 compilation album King of Pops 2.
- Penicillin covered the song as the B-side of their 2014 single "Sol".
- Sora Amamiya covered the song on her 2021 cover album Covers: Sora Amamiya Favorite Songs.

=== Mabushii Futari de ===
Japanese singer-songwriter, Takao Kisugi covered the song in his solo album Labyrinth in 1984.

== Release history ==
| Year | Format(s) | Serial number | Label(s) | Ref. |
|---|---|---|---|---|
| 1984 | LP, CT, CD | L-12591, LKF-8091, 35XL-40 | Warner Pioneer | |
| 1985 | CD | 32XL-73 | Warner Pioneer | |
| 1991 | CD | WPCL-415 | Warner Pioneer | |
| 1996 | CD | WPC6-8186 | Warner Pioneer | |
| 2006 | CD, digital download | WPCL-10281 | Warner Pioneer | |
| 2012 | Super Audio CD, CD hybrid | WPCL-11139 | Warner Pioneer | |
| 2014 | CD | WPCL-11726 | Warner Pioneer | |
| 2018 | LP | WPJL-10088 | Warner Pioneer | |
| 2022 | 2CD | WPCL-13438/9 | Warner Pioneer | |

Notes:

- 2006 re-release includes 24-bit digitally remastered sound source
- 2012 and 2014 re-release includes subtitles in the tracks "2012 remaster"
- 2022 re-release includes lacquer remaster which includes subtitles in the tracks "2022 lacquer remaster" along with original karaoke version of the tracks

== See also ==
- 1984 in Japanese music
