= Warabe =

Warabe may refer to:

- Warabe (group), a Japanese musical grup
- Warabe (album), an album of Kodo
- Warabe uta, a Japanese musical genre
- Faysal Ali Warabe, Somali politician
