= Best Akina Memoires =

Greatest hits album by Akina Nakamori
- Released: December 21, 1983
- Recorded: 1982–1983
- Genre: Idol kayōkyoku
- Length: 46:07
- Language: Japanese
- Label: Warner Pioneer
- Producer: Yoshiaki Tanaka

Akina Nakamori chronology
New Akina Etranger (1983)	Best Akina Memoires (1983)	Anniversary (1984)

Singles from Best Akina Memoires
- 1. "½ no Shinwa" Released: 23 February 1983; 2. "Twilight (Yūgure Dayori)" Released: 1 June 1983; 3. "Kinku" Released: 7 September 1983

Best Akina Memoires is the first greatest hits album by Japanese singer Akina Nakamori. It was released on 21 December 1983 through Warner Pioneer. It was released on the same day as the first music home video New Akina Etranger in Europe. The album consists of all singles released during years 1982-1983 and small number of a popular album tracks.

== Background ==
The album contains all the singles released between 1982 and 1983: from Nakamori's debut "Slow Motion" to her seventh single "Kinku".

The singles "½ no Shinwa", "Twilight (Yūgure Dayori)" and "Kinku" were recorded in the album for first time.

== Promotion ==
=== Singles ===
"'½ no Shinwa" is the fourth single released on 23 February 1983. The single debuted at number 1 on Oricon Single Weekly Chart and became the 13th best sold single in 1983. In The Best Ten ranking, it debuted on number 1 and stayed at number 13 in the yearly chart.

It has received Pop Prize in the television music award Megapolis Festival

"Twilight (Yūgure Dayori)" is the fifth single released on 1 June 1983. The single debuted at number 2 on Oricon Single Weekly Chart and became the 19th best sold single in 1985. In The Best Ten ranking, it debuted on number 1 and stayed at number 27 in the yearly chart.

It has received Gold Dove Award in the 9th Nippon Television Music Festival.

"Kinku" is the sixth single released on 7 September 1983. Although it was never recorded in the album before, in the Music Home Video New Akina Etranger in Europe is recorded the recording footage of the single. The single debuted at number 1 on Oricon Single Weekly Chart and became the 17th best sold single in 1985. In The Best Ten ranking, it debuted on number 1 and stayed at number 10 in the yearly chart.

It has received six awards: Yokohama Music Festival Award in the 10th Yokohama Music Festival, Professional Jury Award in the 9th International Music Festival, Broadcast Music Award in the 14th Japan Music Awards, Golden Idol Award in the 25th Japan Record Awards, Cable Music Award and Most Requested Singer Award in the 16th Japan Cable Awards, Outstanding Star Award and Yomiuri TV Grand Prize in the 16th International Japan Cable Streaming Award.

== Chart performance ==
The album debuted at number 1 on the Oricon Weekly Album Charts and remained in the same position for five consecutive weeks and charted for 24 weeks. The album remained at number 6 on the Oricon Album Yearly Charts in 1984. The album totally sold more than 700,000 copies.

== Track listing ==
All tracks are arranged by Mitsuo Hagita, except where indicated.

No.	Title	Lyrics	Music	Arrangement	Length
1.	"Kinku"	Masao Urino	Haruomi Hosono	Hagita; Hosono	3:50
2.	"Twilight (Yūgure Dayori)"	Etsuko Kisugi	Takao Kisugi		4:43
3.	"Cancel!"	Urino	Kazuhiko Izu		3:27
4.	"Anata no Portrait"	E. Kisugi	T. Kisugi		4:21
5.	"Ruriiro no Yoru he"	E. Kisugi	Juichi Sase		3:41
6.	"Shōjo A"	Urino	Hiroaki Serizawa		3:37
7.	"Sukoshi dake Scandal"	Sho	Sho		3:41
8.	"Slow Motion"	E. Kisugi	T. Kisugi	Motoki Funayama	4:10
9.	"Ginga Densetsu"	Mayumi Shinozuka	Sase		3:43
10.	"½ no Shinwa"	Urino	Yoshiyuki Ohsawa		3:22
11.	"Yokohama Akuma"	Tsuzuru Nakasato	Yoshitaka Minami		3:44
12.	"Second Love"	E. Kisugi	T. Kisugi		4:25
Total length:					46:07

2022 remaster issue
No.	Title	Lyrics	Music	Arrangement	Length
1.	"Nukumori"	Azuki Inoue	Inoue	Hagita	4:34
2.	"Drive"	Jun Horie	Horie	Hagita	4:43
3.	"Ame no Requiem"	Rui Serizawa	Koji Tamaki	Hagita	4:40
Total length:					60:02

== Cover versions ==
=== ½ no Shinwa ===
- Yoshiyuki Ohsawa, original composer of the song covered and released s 1994 single and was included in the album Collage released on the same year.

=== Twilight (Yūgure Dayori) ===
- Takao Kisugi, original composer of the song, covered on his 1983 album Visitor.

=== Kinku ===
- Pai Bing-bing covered the song on her 1984 album Zuìxīn dōngyáng jīnqǔ (最新東洋金曲). Her version is a mix of Taiwanese, Mandarin, and Japanese.
- Hong Kong singer Sara Lee covered the song in Cantonese as "Liàn'ài rèxiàn" (戀愛熱線, "Love Hotline") on her 1985 album Gàobié lǐlìruǐ (告別李麗蕊, Farewell to Li Lirui).
- Leslie Cheung covered the song in Cantonese as "Dì yī cì" (第一次, "The First Time") on his 1985 album Wèi nǎi zhōngqíng (為妳鍾情, My Love for You). He also covered it in Mandarin as "Bèiqì mìngyùn" (背棄命運, "Betrayal of Fate") on his 1986 Taiwan album Yīngxióng běnsè dāngnián qíng (英雄本色當年情, The True Nature of the Hero) and Mandarin-language Hong Kong album Àimù (愛慕, Love).
- Morio Agata covered the song on his 1993 cover album Imitation Gold.

== Release history ==
Year	Format(s)	Serial number	Label(s)	Ref.
1983	LP, CT	L-12590, LKF-8090	Warner Pioneer	
1984	CD, SD	35XL-35, SDM-15012	Warner Pioneer	
1985	CD	32XL-96	Warner Pioneer	
1989	Gold CD	36L2-5112	Warner Pioneer	
1991	CD	WPCL-414	Warner Pioneer	
2006	CD, digital download	WPCL-10280	Warner Pioneer	
2012	Super Audio CD, CD hybrid	WPCL-11138	Warner Pioneer	
2018	LP, CD	WPJL-10087, WPCL-12903	Warner Pioneer	
2022	2CD	WPCL-13418/9	Warner Pioneer	

Notes:

- 2006 re-release includes 24-bit digitally remastered sound source
- 2012 re-release includes subtitles in the tracks "2012 remaster"
- 2022 re-release includes lacquer remaster which includes subtitles in the tracks "2022 lacquer remaster" along with original karaoke version of the tracks

== See also ==
- 1983 in Japanese music
