= Yoshiyuki Ohsawa =

Japanese singer and songwriter (born 1957)

Yoshiyuki Ohsawa 大澤 誉志幸 大沢 誉志幸
- Born: Yoshiyuki Ohsawa; 3 October 1957 (age 69); Kōenji, Suginami-ku, Tokyo, Japan
- Genres: J-pop; R&B; Pop rock; Funk; Soul; City pop; AOR; Bossa nova
- Occupations: Singer-songwriter, Composer, Guitarist, Record producer
- Years active: 1978–present
- Labels: Victor (1981–1982); Epic Sony (1983–1994); East West Japan (1995–1998); Rentrak Japan (2002–2005); Universal Sigma (2008); Continental Star (2011–present)
- Website: ohsawayoshiyuki.com

Yoshiyuki Ohsawa (大澤 誉志幸, Ohsawa Yoshiyuki; born 3 October 1957) is a Japanese singer-songwriter and record producer.

His well-known major hits are "Soshite Boku wa Tohō ni Kureru" (そして僕は途方に暮れる) (1984), "Sonoki xxx (mistake)" (その気×××) (1984), and he also scored a hit with "Go Go Heaven" (ゴーゴーヘブン) (1987), which served as the second opening theme for the television anime series City Hunter.

Among the well-known songs Ohsawa wrote for other artists are Akina Nakamori's "½ no Shinwa" (1983), Kenji Sawada's "Omae ni Check In" (おまえにチェックイン) (1982) and "Hare Nochi Blue Boy" (晴れのちBLUE BOY) (1983), and Masayuki Suzuki's "Garasu-goshi ni Kieta Natsu" (ガラス越しに消えた夏) (1986).

== Career ==
In 1976, Yoshiyuki Ohsawa enrolled in the Department of History, Faculty of Letters at Komazawa University. Deeply influenced by R&B artists such as Otis Redding and John Colbert, he formed the rock band Cloudy Sky in 1978 during his third year of university, serving as its vocalist and guitarist. Following graduation, the Cloudy Sky made their major-label debut under Victor in April 1981, but failed to produce any hit songs and disbanded in 1982.

Following the band's disbandment, Ohsawa wrote single tracks for artists such as Akina Nakamori, Kenji Sawada; the massive success of these releases earned him widespread recognition as a talented songwriter.

In June 1983, Ohsawa made his solo debut as a singer-songwriter under Epic Sony. The massive success of his 1984 release "Soshite Boku wa Tohō ni Kureru" and other tracks further raised his profile as a vocalist. His husky vocals were also praised for their charm.

Alongside releasing numerous solo albums of his own, he continued to write songs for a wide range of artists—including Koji Kikkawa and Ann Lewis—while also producing albums for performers such as Masayuki Suzuki and Masahiro Motoki.

In 1988, he conceptualized and produced a Christmas album Dance To Christmas (Dance To Christmas) that brought together artists including Gwinko, Masayuki Suzuki, The Bubblegum Brothers (バブルガム・ブラザーズ), Kyoko (杏子), and Kiyomi Suzuki (鈴木聖美), which garnered widespread attention.

Since 2012, he has been holding the WATARI DORI Tour, (later renamed the SASURAI Tour), traveling across Japan.

In November 2026, Ohsawa announced the cancellation of all performances of his 2026 Christmas tour, part of his annual SASURAI Tour, due to poor health.

== Discography ==
=== Albums ===
==== Studio albums ====
- Mazui rhythm de bell ga naru (1983)
- SCOOP (1984)
- CONFUSION (1984)
- in・Fin・ity (1985)
- LIFE (1986) – Mini album
- SCRAP STORIES (1987)
- Serious Barbarian (1989)
- Serious Barbarian II (1989)
- Rakuen: Serious Barbarian III (1990)
- NAÏVE (1992)
- MASQUERADE (1993)
- Love Healing (1995)
- Loveduce (1997)
- Love Life (1998)
- Y (2003)

==== Live album ====
- The Night (1998)

==== Self Cover albums ====
- Collage (1994)
- Season's greetings 〜Haru〜 (2008)
- Season's greetings II 〜Yunagi〜 (2008)
- Suigetsu Kyoka (2011)

==== Best albums ====
- Frenzy (1984)
- Frenzy^{2} (1985)
- Y〜naïve collection (1992)
- I.D Y BEST COLLECTION (1998)
- GOLDEN☆BEST Ohsawa Yoshiyuki I.D Y II Y COOOL BEST COLLECTION (Mizu no naka no Knife) (2002)
- THE LEGEND (2003)
- TraXX -Yoshiyuki Ohsawa Single Collection- (2010)
- FRENZY / Frenzy^{2} (2013)
- Ohawa Yoshiyuki Song Book (2017) - Re-recorded in a new version, and also includes brand-new tracks. Disc 2 features tracks composed by Ohsawa for other artists, each performed by its original recording artists.

==== Collaboration albums ====
- Dance To Christmas (1988) - with Various Artists
- & Friends (2013) - with Kumiko Yamashita (山下久美子)
- & Friends II (2014) - ditto
- Celebrate Christmas 〜& Friends II (2023) - ditto

==== Compilation mini-albums ====
- Favorites (2004) – Cover album of favorite songs
- Ashita wa kitto Hallelujah (2012) – Re-recorded album sharing its title with an album released during the Cloudy Sky era.

=== Singles ===
- "Kanojo niwa Wakaranai (Why don't you know)" (1983)
- "e-Escape" (1983)
- "Heartbreak Neurosis" (1984)
- "Sonoki xxx (mistake)" (1984)
- "Soshite Boku wa Tohō ni Kureru" (1984)
- "Kanojo wa Future-rhythm" (1985)
- "Koi ni just can't wait" (1985)
- "Crawl" (1986)
- "Go Go Heaven" (1987)
- "Kimi no Sumu Machikado" (1988)
- "Karui Kimochi" (1988) - Unreleased commercial song. Distributed exclusively to fan club members.
- "Dance To Christmas" (1988) – Collaboration single
- "Stop & Give me Love" (1989)
- "Standard Lover" (1989)
- "G" (1989)
- "REAL ACTION" (1989)
- "Tsuki to Jungle" (1990)
- "Zutto amai Kuchibiru" (1990)
- "Wasure rarenakute" (1992)
- "naïve/Niji wo Koete" (1992)
- "Hatsukoi" (1993) - The theme song of the anime film Bonobono
- "Angelic Baby" (1993)
- "Namida no Kawarini" (1993)
- "½ no Shinwa" (1994) - Self Cover
- "Garasu-goshi ni Kieta Natsu" (1994) - Self Cover
- "Aisuru Chikara 〜Ashita e, Mirai e〜" (1995)
- "Amai Kankei" (1995)
- "Setsunai toki wa Boku ga Iru 〜Subarashii Sekai〜" (1995)
- "Candle wo Kesanaide" (1996) - Duet with Caoli Cano
- "Lovejenic" (1997)
- "Topaz" (1998)
- "Summer Breeze 〜Kokoro ga Kaeru Basho〜" (2002)
- "Natsu no Owari no Gogo" (2005)
- "Soshite Boku wa Tohō ni Kureru (25th ver.)" (2008)
- "Pink Spider" (2013) - Duet with DIE, hide tribute Cover
- "Soshite Boku wa Tohō ni Kureru (2023 movie ver.)" (2022)

== Notable songwriting credits for other singers ==
- Beat Takeshi
  - "Daita Koshi ga CHA CHA CHA" (1984)
  - "BIG na Kibun de Utawasero" (1985)
  - "Kanashii kibun de joke" (1985)

others

- Chara
  - "Pretty in Pink" (1993)
- 14 Karat Soul
  - "Kierra, For You" (1992)
  - "Kleenex, For You" (1993)
- Hiromi Go
  - "Bion LANGUAGE" (1984)
  - "Onna Shiteru" (1984)
- Tomoyo Harada
  - "Tsuzukete" (1985)
- Seri Ishikawa
  - "Eien no ½"
  - "Minazuki no Carmen"
- Kōji Kikkawa
  - "LA VIE EN ROSE" (1984)
  - "No No Circulation" (1984)

others

- Kyoko Koizumi
  - "Eien no Tomodachi" (1993)
  - others
- Ruriko Kubou
  - "Plastic Man Life" (1990)
  - "Young Girl Blue" (1990)
- Ann Lewis
  - "Bara no Kiseki" (1984)

others

- Keiko Masuda
  - "Raspberry" (1995)
- Seiko Matsuda
  - "Ame no Coney Island" (1986)
- Masahiro Motoki
  - "17 nichi me no Kodoku" (1986)
  - "Manatsu no yoru ni Tango" (1991)
- Akina Nakamori
  - "½ no Shinwa" (1983)
- Yōko Oginome
  - "Namida wa Speed Yurasukara" (1986)
  - "Natsu no Stage Light" (1986)
- Hiroyuki Sanada
  - "Kizu darake no Crash" (1984)
- Kenji Sawada
  - "Omae ni Check In" (1982)
  - "Hare Nochi Blue Boy" (1983)

many others

- Masayuki Suzuki
  - mother of pearl (1986) - Produced album
  - "Garasu-goshi ni Kieta Natsu" (1986)
  - "Private hotel" (1990)
  - "MIDNIGHT TRAVELER" (1993)
- Satomi Takasugi
  - "Tohku Hanaretemo" (2007)
- UP-BEAT
  - "Kiss… Ikinari Tengoku" (1986)
- Kumiko Yamashita
  - "Don't Delay" (1981)
  - "Jidai okure no Koigokoro" (1982)
  - "Kocchi wo omuki yo Sophia" (1983)
  - "Choi machi Baby Nagori no Kiss ga" (1983)

many others

- Aki Yashiro
  - "AKI'S HOLY NIGHT" (2001)

== Film appearances ==
- Hong Kong Paradise (1990) - Role: Himuro

== See also ==
- And So I'm at a Loss

== Sources ==
- Ohsawa, Yoshiyuki (January 10, 1987). Curve in New York (in Japanese). CBS Sony Publisher. ISBN 978-4-7897-0268-3.
- Kimura, Yutaka (January 31, 2020). ジャパニーズ・シティ・ポップ―ディスク・コレクション [Japanese City Pop: Disc Collection] (in Japanese) (expanded ed.). Shinko Music Entertainment. ISBN 978-4-401-64877-1.
