= Chinfa Kan =

Japanese writer (born 1953)

Chinfa Kan 康 珍化
- Also known as: Shirusu Morita
- Born: Kang Jin-hwa (강진화); June 24, 1953 (age 73); Hamamatsu, Shizuoka, Japan
- Genres: J-pop; kayōkyoku; pop rock; city pop
- Occupation: Lyricist
- Years active: 1979–present

Chinfa Kan (康 珍化, Kan Chinfa) (born June 24, 1953) is a Japanese lyricist of Korean descent.

== Biography ==
Chinfa Kan was born in Hamamatsu, Shizuoka, Japan, as a second-generation Zainichi. He graduated from Shizuoka Prefectural Hamamatsu-Nishi Senior and Junior High Schools. While attending Waseda University, he took up tanka writing and participated in the college's short song festivals. Kan made his debut as a lyricist in 1979 with Ann Lewis' "Shampoo", which was composed, arranged, and produced by Tatsuro Yamashita. He then wrote numerous hit songs with Tetsuji Hayashi. Kan also wrote lyrics for artists such as Hiromi Go, The Checkers, Agnes Chan, Akina Nakamori, Kyōko Koizumi, Anri, Miho Nakayama, KinKi Kids, Mika Nakashima, and BoA.

In 1984, Kan won the Best Lyrics Award for Mariko Takahashi's "Momoiro Toiki" at the 26th Japan Record Awards. A year later, he won the Grand Prix for Nakamori's "Meu amor é..."

Kan also wrote screenplays for the films Inamura Jane (1990) and Tokyo no Kyūjitsu (1991).

== Works ==
=== Lyrics ===
Anri

- "Kanashimi ga Tomaranai"

BoA

- "Kimochi wa Tsutawaru"
- "Valenti"
- "Quincy"
- "Merry Chri"

Agnes Chan

- "Kaettekita Tsubame"

Cindy

- “Surprise”
- ”Special Ever Happened”
- "Watashitachi o Shinjite Ite"
- "Tenshi no Kimochi"
- ”Must Be Lucky - Ai no Kuni He”
- ”Rose Color”

The Checkers

- "Gizagiza Heart no Komoriuta"
- "Kamisama Help!"

Rina Chinen

- "Club Zipangu"

Hiromi Go

- "Goldfinger '99"
- "Ienai yo"
- "Kemono wa Hadaka ni Naritagaru"
- "Koi wa Shumishumi"
- "Mirror Ball Fantasy"

Gospellers

- "Atarashii Sekai"

Tomoyo Harada

- "Tengoku ni Ichiban Chikai Shima"
- "Aijō Monogatari"
- "Sōshun Monogatari"

Tetsuji Hayashi

- "Kanashimi ga Ippai"

Hikaru Genji

- "Tsurugi no Mai"
- "Lila no Saku koro Barcelona"

Hiromi Iwasaki

- "Suteki na Kimochi"
- "Hatachi no Koi"

Yoshimi Iwasaki

- "Touch"

Momoko Kikuchi

- "Mō Aenai ka mo Shirenai"

KinKi Kids

- "Zenbu Dakishimete"
- "Ame no Melody"
- "Natsu no Ōsama"

Kyoko Koizumi

- "Makka na Onna no Ko"
- "Adesugata Namida Musume"
- "Nagisa no Haikara Ningyo"
- "Yamato Nadeshiko Shichihenge"
- "Koi no Beginner"
- "Presentation"
- "Flapper"
- "Kaze no Falsetto"

Masahiko Kondō

- "Aa, Gutto"
- "Naite Mirya Ijan"

Shizuka Kudo

- "Futari ni Sasete"

Iyo Matsumoto

- "Dakishimetai"
- "Chinese Kiss"

Mie

- "Call Girl -Maria at Dawn-"

Yoko Minamino

- "Hazukashi Sugite"
- "Approach"
- "Namida wa Doko e Itta no"
- Snowflakes

Hiroko Moriguchi

- "Sumire no Kimochi (Try Me Again)"

Akina Nakamori

- "Kita Wing"
- "Namida no Katachi no Earring"
- "October Storm"
- "Dramatic Airport (Kita Wing Part II)"
- "Meu amor é..."
- "Akaitori Nigeta"

Masatoshi Nakamura

- "Hitori Botchi no Yoru Sora ni"

Mika Nakashima

- "Cry No More"

Miho Nakayama

- "Mermaid"
- "Witches"
- "Rosécolor"

Yōko Oginome

- "Sayonara kara Hajimaru Monogatari"

Yukiko Okada

- "Oka no Ue no High School"
- "Shiokaze no Love Letter"
- "Koi no Doubles"
- "Me wo Samashite, Darling"
- "Anata wo Wasureru Mahō ga Areba"
- "Shōyō Note"

Takako Ōta

- "Wasure China no Aoi Tori"

Pink Lady

- "Body & Soul"

Hideki Saijo

- "Natsu no Imōto"
- "Whispering Night"

Noriko Sakai

- "Namida ga Tomaranai (How! Aw! Ya!)"
- "Karui Kimochi no Julia"
- "Nagisa no Pitecan Trops"

Junko Sakurada

- "Utsukushii Natsu"

Kenji Sawada

- "Dear"
- "Sutezerifu"

Hitomi Shimatani

- "Papillon"
- "Ichiba ni Ikō"
- "Splash"
- "Yasashii Kiss no Mitsukekata"
- "Shanti"
- "Pasio"

Shonentai

- "Kimi Dake ni"

Stardust Revue

- "Stay My Blue (Kimi ga Koishikute)"
- "Shichigatsu Nanoka"

Kiyotaka Sugiyama

- "Nagisa no Subete"

S. Kiyotaka & Omega Tribe

- "Summer Suspicion"
- "Asphalt Lady"
- "Kimi no Heart wa Marine Blue"
- "Riverside Hotel"
- "Futari no Natsu Monogatari"
- "Silence ga Ippai"
- "Glass no Palm Tree"

Mizue Takada

- "China Lights"

Mariko Takahashi

- "Momoiro Toiki"

Eriko Tamura

- "Ningyo no T-shirt"

Misato Watanabe

- "I'm Free"

Wink

- "Kekkon Shiyoune"

Tatsuro Yamashita

- "Shampoo"
- "Hajimete no Shiawase"

Takuro Yoshida

- "Tomo Ari"
- "Zenbu Dakishimete"

Tokusatsu themes

- "Choudenshi Bioman"
- "Ultraman Gaia!"

=== Screenplays ===
- Inamura Jane (1990, film)
- Tokyo no Kyūjitsu (1991, film)
- Down the World: Mervil's Ambition (1994, video game)
- Galerians (1999, video game)
- Galerians: Rion (2002, OVA)
