= Southern Wind =

Single by Akina Nakamori

from the album Possibility
- Language: Japanese
- B-side: "Yume Haruka"
- Released: April 11, 1984
- Recorded: 1983
- Genre: J-pop; kayōkyoku; pop rock
- Length: 3:52
- Label: Reprise Records
- Composer: Kōji Tamaki
- Lyricist: Etsuko Kisugi
- Producer: Yūzō Shimada

Akina Nakamori singles chronology
"Kita Wing" (1984)	"Southern Wind" (1984)	"Jukkai (1984)" (1984)

Music videos
- "Southern Wind" (Live) on YouTube

"Southern Wind" (サザン・ウインド, Sazan Uindo) is the eighth single by Japanese entertainer Akina Nakamori. Written by Etsuko Kisugi and Kōji Tamaki, the single was released on April 11, 1984, by Warner Pioneer through the Reprise label. It was also the lead single from her sixth studio album Possibility.

The single became Nakamori's fourth No. 1 on Oricon's weekly singles chart and sold over 543,900 copies.

== Track listing ==
Original release
No.	Title	Lyrics	Music	Arrangement	Length
1.	"Southern Wind" (Sazan Uindo (サザン・ウインド))	Etsuko Kisugi	Kōji Tamaki	Ichizō Seo	3:52
2.	"Yume Haruka" ((夢遥か; "Dream Far Away"))	Maya Shōno	Masami Koizumi	Mitsuo Hagita	3:47
Total length:					7:39

1998 reissue bonus track
No.	Title	Lyrics	Music	Length
3.	"Southern Wind (Live Version)" ((サザン・ウインド(LIVE VERSION)))	Kisugi	Tamaki

== Charts ==
Chart (1984)	Peak position
Japan (Oricon)	1

== Covers ==
Hong Kong singer Alan Tam covered the song in Chinese, was included in the cover album Magic Cover released in 1984 under Polygram Records.

Original composer of the song, Kōji Tamaki covers the song in the 2024 self-cover album "Tamaki Kōji no Ongaku Sekai" and in Nakamori's 2025 tribute album "Nakamori Akina Tribute Album: Meikyo".

== Release history ==
Year	Format(s)	Serial number	Label(s)	Ref.
1984	7inch LP	L-1664	Warner Pioneer	
1988	8cm CD, CT	10SL-137, 10L5-4047	Warner Pioneer	
1998	12cm CD	WPC6-8665	Warner Pioneer	
2008	Digital download	-	Warner Pioneer	
2014	Digital download - remaster	-	Warner Pioneer	

== See also ==
- 1984 in Japanese music
