= ½ no Shinwa =

Single by Akina Nakamori

from the album Best Akina Memoires
- Language: Japanese
- English title: Half the Myth
- B-side: "Nukumori"
- Released: February 23, 1983
- Recorded: 1982
- Genre: J-pop; kayōkyoku
- Length: 3:20
- Label: Reprise Records
- Composer: Yoshiyuki Ohsawa
- Lyricist: Masao Urino
- Producer: Yoshiaki Tanaka

Akina Nakamori singles chronology
"Second Love" (1982)	"½ no Shinwa" (1983)	"Twilight (Yūgure Dayori)" (1983)

Music videos
- "½ no Shinwa" (Live) on YouTube

"½ no Shinwa" (1/2の神話, Nibun no Ichi no Shinwa; lit. "Half the Myth") is the fourth single by Japanese entertainer Akina Nakamori. Written by Masao Urino and Yoshiyuki Ohsawa, the single was released on February 23, 1983, by Warner Pioneer through the Reprise label. It was also the lead single from her first greatest hits album Best Akina Memoires.

== Background ==
"½ no Shinwa" was originally titled "Furyō ½" (不良1/2, Furyō Nibun no Ichi; lit. "Half as Bad"), but NHK executives insisted to have the title changed under the network's strict broadcasting regulations. Lyricist Urino was dissatisfied with the title change, as he felt it hindered the impact of the song.

Composer Ohsawa self-covered "½ no Shinwa" on his 1994 album Collage. Nakamori has re-recorded the song for the 2006 compilation Best Finger 25th Anniversary Selection. In 2010, she re-recorded the song for the pachinko machine CR Nakamori Akina: Utahime Densetsu ~Koi Moni Dome nara~ (CR中森明菜・歌姫伝説〜恋も二度目なら〜; CR Akina Nakamori: Utahime Legend ~If Love Is For the Second Time~).

== Chart performance ==
"½ no Shinwa" became Nakamori's second No. 1 on Oricon's weekly singles chart and sold over 573,100 copies.

== Track listing ==
All music is arranged by Mitsuo Hagita.

Original release
No.	Title	Lyrics	Music	Length
1.	"½ no Shinwa" (Nibun no Ichi no Shinwa (1/2の神話; "Half the Myth"))	Masao Urino	Yoshiyuki Ohsawa	3:20
2.	"Nukumori" ((温り; "Warmth"))	Azusa Inoue	Inoue	4:34
Total length:				7:54

1998 reissue bonus track
No.	Title	Lyrics	Music	Length
3.	"½ no Shinwa (Live Version)" ((1/2の神話(LIVE VERSION)))	Urino	Ohsawa

== Charts ==
Chart (1983)	Peak position
Japan (Oricon)	1

== Release history ==
Year	Format(s)	Serial number	Label(s)	Ref.
1983	7inch LP	L-1660	Warner Pioneer	
1988	8cm CD, CT	10SL-133, 10L5-4043	Warner Pioneer	
1998	12cm CD	WPC6-8661	Warner Pioneer	
2008	Digital download	-	Warner Pioneer	
2014	Digital download - remaster	-	Warner Pioneer	

== See also ==
- 1983 in Japanese music
