= Kinku (song) =

Single by Akina Nakamori

from the album Best Akina Memoires
- Language: Japanese
- English title: Forbidden Zone
- B-side: "Ame no Requiem"
- Released: September 7, 1983
- Recorded: 1983
- Genre: J-pop; kayōkyoku
- Length: 3:48
- Label: Reprise Records
- Composer: Haruomi Hosono
- Lyricist: Masao Urino
- Producer: Yoshiaki Tanaka

Akina Nakamori singles chronology
"Twilight (Yūgure Dayori)" (1983)	"Kinku" (1983)	"Kita Wing" (1984)

Music videos
- "Kinku" (Live) on YouTube

"Kinku" (禁区; lit. "Forbidden Zone") is the sixth single by Japanese entertainer Akina Nakamori. Written by Masao Urino and Haruomi Hosono, the single was released on September 7, 1983, by Warner Pioneer through the Reprise label. It was also the third single from her first greatest hits album Best Akina Memoires.

== Background ==
Nakamori performed the song on the 34th Kōhaku Uta Gassen, making her debut on NHK's New Year's Eve special. In 2010, she re-recorded the song for the pachinko machine CR Nakamori Akina: Utahime Densetsu ~Koi Moni Dome nara~ (CR中森明菜・歌姫伝説〜恋も二度目なら〜; CR Akina Nakamori: Utahime Legend ~If Love Is For the Second Time~).

== Chart performance ==
"Kinku" became Nakamori's third No. 1 on Oricon's weekly singles chart and sold over 511,000 copies.

== Track listing ==
Original release
No.	Title	Lyrics	Music	Arrangement	Length
1.	"Kinku" ((禁区; "Forbidden Zone"))	Masao Urino	Haruomi Hosono	Mitsuo Hagita; Hosono	3:48
2.	"Ame no Requiem" (Ame no Rekuiemu (雨のレクイエム; "Requiem of the Rain"))	Rui Serizawa	Kōji Tamaki	Hagita	4:43
Total length:					8:31

1998 reissue bonus track
No.	Title	Lyrics	Music	Length
3.	"Kinku (Live Version)" ((禁区(LIVE VERSION)))	Urino	Hosono

== Charts ==
Chart (1983)	Peak position
Japan (Oricon)	1

== Cover versions ==
=== Kinku ===
- Pai Bing-bing covered the song on her 1984 album Zuìxīn dōngyáng jīnqǔ (最新東洋金曲). Her version is a mix of Taiwanese, Mandarin, and Japanese.
- Hong Kong singer Sara Lee covered the song in Cantonese as "Liàn'ài rèxiàn" (戀愛熱線, "Love Hotline") on her 1985 album Gàobié lǐlìruǐ (告別李麗蕊, Farewell to Li Lirui).
- Leslie Cheung covered the song in Cantonese as "Dì yī cì" (第一次, "The First Time") on his 1985 album Wèi nǎi zhōngqíng (為妳鍾情, My Love for You). He also covered it in Mandarin as "Bèiqì mìngyùn" (背棄命運, "Betrayal of Fate") on his 1986 Taiwan album Yīngxióng běnsè dāngnián qíng (英雄本色當年情, The True Nature of the Hero) and Mandarin-language Hong Kong album Àimù (愛慕, Love).
- Morio Agata covered the song on his 1993 cover album Imitation Gold.

=== Ame no Requiem ===
- Koji Tamaki covered the song on his 2025 self-cover album "Tamaki Koji no Ongaku Sekai II".

== Release history ==
Year	Format(s)	Serial number	Label(s)	Ref.
1983	7inch LP	L-1662	Warner Pioneer	
1988	8cm CD, CT	10SL-135, 10L5-4045	Warner Pioneer	
1998	12cm CD	WPC6-8663	Warner Pioneer	
2008	Digital download	-	Warner Pioneer	
2014	Digital download - remaster	-	Warner Pioneer	

== See also ==
- 1983 in Japanese music
