= Twilight (Yūgure Dayori) =

Single by Akina Nakamori

from the album Best Akina Memoires
- Language: Japanese
- English title: Twilight (Twilight News)
- B-side: "Drive"
- Released: June 1, 1983
- Recorded: 1983
- Genre: J-pop; kayōkyoku
- Length: 4:44
- Label: Reprise Records
- Composer: Takao Kisugi
- Lyricist: Etsuko Kisugi
- Producer: Yoshiaki Tanaka

Akina Nakamori singles chronology
"½ no Shinwa" (1983)	"Twilight (Yūgure Dayori)" (1983)	"Kinku" (1983)

Music videos
- "Twilight (Yūgure Dayori)" (Live) on YouTube

"Twilight (Yūgure Dayori)" (トワイライト -夕暮れ便り-, Towairaito -Yūgure Dayori-; lit. "Twilight (Twilight News)") is the fifth single by Japanese entertainer Akina Nakamori. Written by Etsuko Kisugi and Takao Kisugi, the single was released on June 1, 1983, by Warner Pioneer through the Reprise label. It was also the second single from her first greatest hits album Best Akina Memoires.

The single peaked at No. 2 on Oricon's weekly singles chart and sold over 429,600 copies.

== Track listing ==
All music is arranged by Mitsuo Hagita.

Original release
No.	Title	Lyrics	Music	Length
1.	"Twilight (Yūgure Dayori)" (Towairaito -Yūgure Dayori- (トワイライト -夕暮れ便り-; "Twilight (Twilight News)"))	Etsuko Kisugi	Takao Kisugi	4:44
2.	"Drive" (Doraibu (ドライブ))	Jun Horie	Horie	4:43
Total length:				9:27

1998 reissue bonus track
No.	Title	Lyrics	Music	Length
3.	"Twilight (Yūgure Dayori) (Live Version)" ((トワイライト -夕暮れ便り-(LIVE VERSION)))	E. Kisugi	T. Kisugi

== Charts ==
Chart (1983)	Peak position
Japan (Oricon)	2

== Cover versions ==
- Gyubin covered the song in Nakamori's 2025 tribute album "Nakamori Akina Tribute Album: Meikyo".

== Release history ==
Year	Format(s)	Serial number	Label(s)	Ref.
1983	7inch LP	L-1661	Warner Pioneer	
1988	8cm CD, CT	10SL-134, 10L5-4044	Warner Pioneer	
1998	12cm CD	WPC6-8662	Warner Pioneer	
2008	Digital download	-	Warner Pioneer	
2014	Digital download - remaster	-	Warner Pioneer	

== See also ==
- 1983 in Japanese music
