= And So I'm at a Loss =

And So I’m at a Loss
- Theatrical release poster
- Japanese: そして僕は途方に暮れる
- Directed by: Daisuke Miura
- Written by: Daisuke Miura
- Produced by: Keisuke Konishi; Yasuhiro Masaoka; Takeshi Sawa
- Starring: Taisuke Fujigaya; Atsuko Maeda; Akiyoshi Nakao; Mieko Harada; Etsushi Toyokawa
- Cinematography: Kosuke Haruki; Taku Nagase
- Music by: Kazuhisa Uchihashi; Yoshiyuki Ohsawa "Soshite Boku wa Tohou ni Kureru"
- Production companies: Amuse Inc. Digital Frontier
- Distributed by: Happinet Phantom Studios
- Release dates: 28 October 2022 (Tokyo); 13 January 2023 (Japan)
- Running time: 122 minutes
- Country: Japan
- Language: Japanese
- Box office: $382,793

And So Iʼm at a Loss (そして僕は途方に暮れる, Soshite Boku wa Tohou ni Kureru) is a 2022 Japanese drama film written and directed by Daisuke Miura and starring Taisuke Fujigaya, Atsuko Maeda, Akiyoshi Nakao, Mieko Harada and Etsushi Toyokawa. It was released on 13 January 2023.

== Cast ==
- Taisuke Fujigaya as Yūsuke Sugawara
- Atsuko Maeda as Maho Yonaga
- Akiyoshi Nakao
- Mieko Harada
- Etsushi Toyokawa
- Karina Nose
- Shūhei Nomura as Katō

== Production ==
The film was announced in March 2021. The trailer of the film was released on 29 December 2022.

== Release ==
The film was screened at the 35th Tokyo International Film Festival on 28 October 2022 and Hawaii International Film Festival on 5 April 2023.

== Reception ==
James Hadfield of The Japan Times and Wendy Ide of Screen Daily reviewed the film.
