= Kokinshū (album) =

Studio album by Hiroko Yakushimaru
- Released: February 14, 1984
- Genre: pop, kayokyoku
- Length: 35:53 (original edition)
- Language: Japanese
- Label: Toshiba EMI/East World
- Producer: Hiroshi Ōkawa, Munetake Koga, Kazumi Harasawa

Hiroko Yakushimaru chronology
Kokinshū (1984)	Yume Jūwa (1985)

Kokinshū (古今集) is the debut studio album by Japanese singer and actress Hiroko Yakushimaru, released in 1984.

== Track listing ==
Side one
No.	Title	Lyrics	Music	Arranger	Length
1.	"Genki o Dashite (元気を出して)"	Mariya Takeuchi	Mariya Takeuchi	Kazuo Shiina	3:58
2.	"Tsubuyaki no Onpu (つぶやきの音符)"	Etsuko Kisugi	Yoshitaka Minami	Akira Inoue	2:40
3.	"Triangle (トライアングル)"	Mariya Takeuchi	Mariya Takeuchi	Kazuo Shiina	3:35
4.	"Carmel no Garou Nite (カーメルの画廊にて)"	Reiko Yukawa	Katsuo Ohno	Shirō Sagisu	3:38
5.	"Nemuri no Sakamichi (眠りの坂道)"	Etsuko Kisugi	Yoshitaka Minami	Akira Inoue	4:15

Side two
No.	Title	Lyrics	Music	Arranger	Length
6.	"Shiroi Sanpomichi (白い散歩道)"	Taeko Ōnuki	Taeko Ōnuki	Nobuyuki Shimizu	4:28
7.	"Jeanne d'Arc ni Naresō (ジャンヌダルクになれそう)"	Yōko Aki	Akira Inoue	Akira Inoue	4:32
8.	"Tsuki no Opera (月のオペラ)"	Taeko Onuki	Taeko Onuki	Nobuyuki Shimizu	3:58
9.	"Adolescence (Jūdai Kōki) (アドレサンス(十代後期))"	Yōko Aki	Akira Inoue	Akira Inoue	4:01

Bonus tracks
No.	Title	Lyrics	Music	Arranger	Length
10.	"Tantei Monogatari (探偵物語)"	Takashi Matsumoto	Eiichi Ohtaki	Akira Inoue	3:56
11.	"Sukoshi Dake Yasashiku (すこしだけ やさしく)"	Takashi Matsumoto	Eiichi Ohtaki	Akira Inoue	4:40
12.	"Sailor-fuku to Kikanjū (セーラー服と機関銃)"	Etsuko Kisugi	Takao Kisugi	Akira Inoue	4:44
13.	"Tantei Monogatari (探偵物語) (strings version)"	Takashi Matsumoto	Eiichi Ohtaki	Akira Inoue	3:55

== Charts ==
=== Weekly charts ===
Year	Country	Chart	Position	Sales
1984	Japan	Oricon Weekly LP Albums Chart (top 100)	1	477,000
1984	Japan	Oricon Weekly CT Albums Chart (top 100)	1	477,000

=== Year-end charts ===
Chart (1984)	Position
Japanese Oricon Albums Chart	12

== See also ==
- 1984 in Japanese music
