= Futari no Natsu Monogatari =

1985 single by S. Kiyotaka & Omega Tribe

Single by S. Kiyotaka & Omega Tribe

from the album Another Summer
- B-side: "Farewell Call"
- Released: March 6, 1985
- Genre: Album-oriented rock; city pop
- Length: 3:57
- Label: VAP
- Composer: Tetsuji Hayashi
- Lyricist: Chinfa Kan
- Producer: Koichi Fujita

S. Kiyotaka & Omega Tribe singles chronology
"Riverside Hotel" (1984)	"Futari no Natsu Monogatari" (1985)	"Silence ga Ippai" (1985)

"Futari no Natsu Monogatari Never Ending Summer" (Japanese: ふたりの夏物語 Never Ending Summer, Hepburn: Futari no Natsu Monogatari Nebā Endingu Samā) is a single by Japanese band S. Kiyotaka & Omega Tribe released by VAP on March 6, 1985. Recognized as the band's most popular and their signature song, it emerged as a collaboration between Omega Tribe and Japan Airlines. Written by Tetsuji Hayashi and Chinfa Kan, it was composed and recorded in three days while the band was on tour.

== Background and release ==
The song was composed by Tetsuji Hayashi with lyrics by Chinfa Kan as a collaboration between the band and Japan Airlines's JALPAK '85 campaign. Hayashi had been occupied composing songs for other artists, while the band was on tour. However, after the collaboration was settled, Hayashi was assigned an advertising slogan, which would later serve as the song's chorus. The duo finished the song in just two days, prompting the band to be called from their tour to record it on the final day. The song would be used in commercials for Japan Airlines that same year.

The single was included in the band's fourth album, Another Summer, with minor adjustments made to the mixing. Later, it was included in the remix album Another Summer Remix and various compilation albums by the band.

== Commercial performance ==
The single was the band's top-selling hit, with 380,000 copies sold and a peak at No. 5 on the Oricon charts. In 2013, the song would appear on Billboard Japan Hot 100, peaking at 97. It also appeared on Billboard Japan Adult Contemporary chart at 14.

The song also made appearances on Tokyo Broadcasting System's Uta no Top Ten and Nippon TV's The Top Ten. However, due to the band disbanding at the end of 1985, it was absent from the end-of-year program.

== Performances and impact ==
The band performed "Futari no Natsu Monogatari Never Ending Summer" as part of Japan's Live Aid concert broadcast on July 13, 1985. The song was the ending theme for the 1986 TV Asahi drama Mama Haha VS Mama Musume, iede Reijō no Kagai Jugyō koi mo Wakare Momonja-shō!

Patrick St. Michel of The Japan Times described the song as one that "still inspire warm memories for those who came of age during Japan’s period of extravagance" alongside "Summer Suspicion". It has also been described as the band's signature song, with the band performing the song on reunion tours. The song has also been performed at Hayashi's 50th anniversary performance at the Tokyo International Forum.

== Track listing ==
=== Single ===
Side A/B
No.	Title	Lyrics	Music	Arrangement	Length
1.	"Futari no Natsu Monogatari Never Ending Summer" (ふたりの夏物語 Never Ending Summer)	Chinfa Kan	Tetsuji Hayashi	Hayashi	3:57
2.	"Farewell Call"	Yasushi Akimoto	Shinji Takashima	Ken Shiguma	4:47

== Charts ==
=== Weekly charts ===
Chart (1985)	Peak position
Oricon Singles Chart	5

Chart (2013)	Peak position
Billboard (Japan Hot 100)	97
Billboard (Adult Contemporary)	14

=== Year-end charts ===
Chart (1985)	Peak position
Oricon	15

== See also ==
- 1985 in Japanese music
