= Tetsuji Hayashi =

Japanese composer and musician (born 1949)

Tetsuji Hayashi 林 哲司
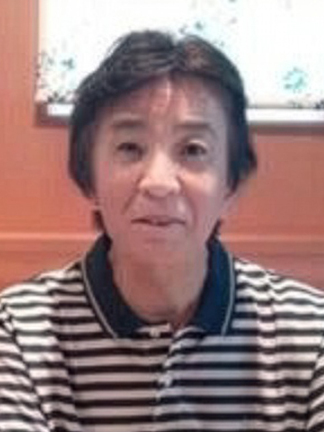
- Hayashi in 2019

Background information
- Born: August 20, 1949 (age 76); Fuji, Shizuoka, Japan
- Genres: City pop; J-pop
- Occupations: Composer; singer-songwriter; arranger
- Years active: 1973–present
- Website: www.hayashitetsuji.com
- Education: Nihon University

Tetsuji Hayashi (林 哲司, Hayashi Tetsuji; born August 20, 1949) is a Japanese composer, singer-songwriter, and arranger known for his influential contributions to the development of J-pop and city pop during the 1980s. He was exposed to Western pop music from an early age, sparking his passion for music. He honed his skills as a composer and arranger, and in 1978, he composed Mariya Takeuchi's debut album, Beginning, followed by her hit single "September" in 1979 and "Mayonaka no Door" for Miki Matsubara that same year. His collaborations extended to other prominent artists such as S. Kiyotaka & Omega Tribe, Masaki Ueda and Junichi Inagaki.

Despite initially planning retirement in 2008, Hayashi returned to the spotlight due to fan support at a commemorative concert. Since then, he has continued to compose and produce music. His legacy was celebrated with the release of the compilation album 50th Anniversary Special A Tribute of Hayashi Tetsuji: Saudade in 2023, accompanied by a concert showcasing his impact.

== Early life and education ==
Tetsuji Hayashi was born on August 20, 1949, in Fuji, Shizuoka, as the youngest of five siblings. His father ran a paper mill. Exposed to Western pop music from an early age, he and his brother were lent an acoustic guitar by an employee of his father's. He attended Shizuoka Prefectural Fuji High School and was inspired by school band performances and the style of the Beatles. He begged his parents for an electric guitar to join a circle of seniors. Around this time, he began composing, admiring Yūzō Kayama and imitating others, eventually writing 200 songs as a student. By the time he was 20, he entered the Yamaha Music School, sponsored by the Yamaha music magazine Light Music, which he would later go on to edit.

== Career ==
=== Early career ===
In 1972, he submitted his song "Sore ga Koi no Owari Nara" to the 3rd World Popular Song Festival hosted in Chile, which helped him debut as a singer-songwriter in April 1973. He met singer Junko Ohashi before her debut in June 1974, and provided her with the songs "Kyashī no Uwasa" and "Rainy Saturday & Coffee Break." In 1975, businessmen from Fuji Pacific Music showcased a demo tape of Hayashi's work, including songs by Ohashi, at Midem in Cannes, France. The song "Sore ga Koi no Owari Nara" became a favorite of Chas Peate, the producer of the British rock band Jigsaw, and would be included as a song in Pieces of Music, under the name "If I Have To Go Away." Originally planned to be only included in Jigsaw's album, the song was deemed more complete than expected and was released as a single in 1977, charting in both the United Kingdom and the United States.

=== Composing hits ===
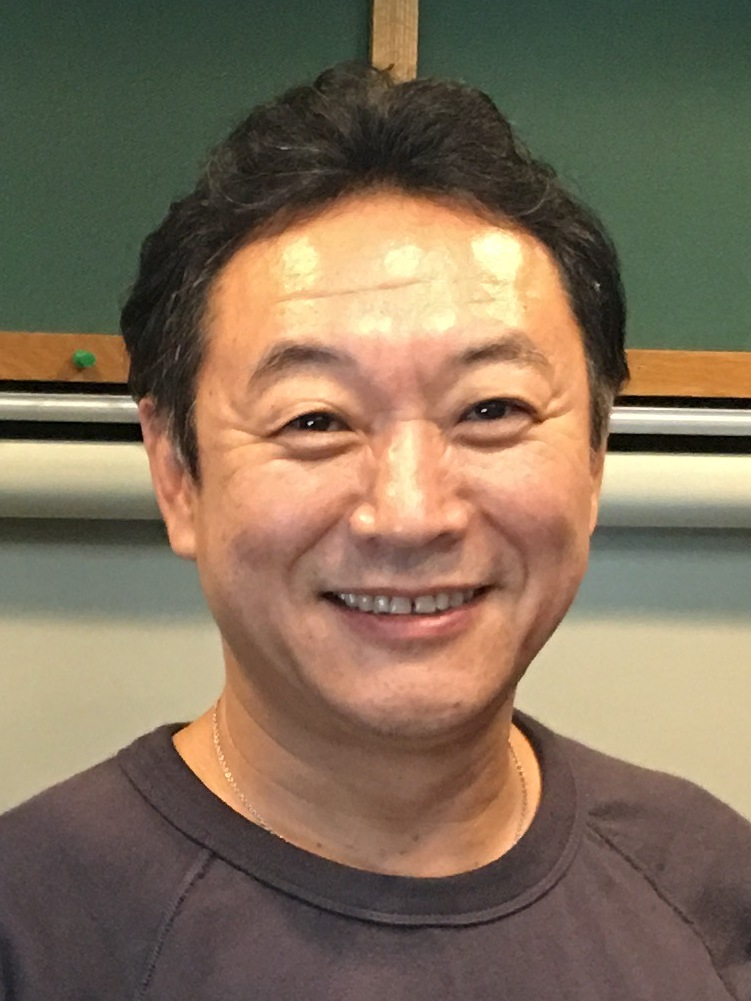
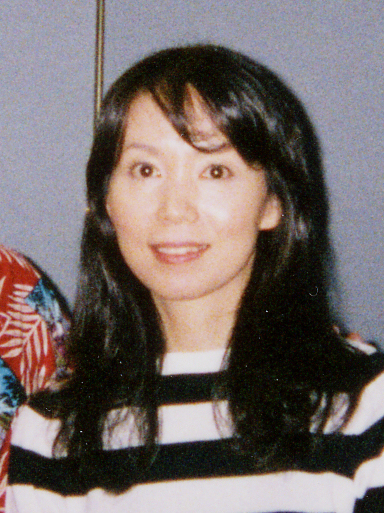
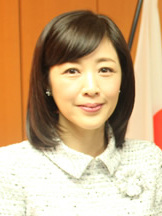
Hayashi has composed songs for Kiyotaka Sugiyama, Mariya Takeuchi, and Momoko Kikuchi.

In 1978, he helped compose the song "Goodbye Summer Breeze" for Mariya Takeuchi's debut album Beginning. The following year, he wrote "September," Takeuchi's third single, which earned her the Japan Record Award for Best New Artist at the 21st Japan Record Awards in December 1979. That same year, he composed the song "Mayonaka no Door" for Miki Matsubara. The single's commercial success significantly boosted the popularity of both Matsubara and Hayashi. In 1984 he also took part in the composition of the third opening theme of the 1981 anime Urusei Yatsura, "Pajama Jama Da".

Back in 1983, he became involved with the band S. Kiyotaka & Omega Tribe, which was part of the Omega Tribe project by Koichi Fujita with Kiyotaka Sugiyama as the lead singer. He contributed to writing all of their singles and multiple other songs, including "Summer Suspicion" (1983), "Kimi no Heart wa Marine Blue" (1984), and "Futari no Natsu Monogatari" (1985), the latter of which was completed in two days. He convinced the group to record a final album after they had voted to split up, resulting in the 1985 album First Finale.

That same year he became involved with Omega Tribe, he met Junichi Inagaki and later provided the songs "Maria" and "Idasenakute" for Inagaki's third album J.I., as well as providing the song "Kanashī Iroyane" for Masaki Ueda. After he wrote "Summer Suspicion," idol Akina Nakamori requested that he write a song for her. She asked for something between the strong "Shōjo A" and the gentle "Second Love." Although Hayashi found this a challenging request, he wrote the song "Kita Wing". He also became widely active as a music director and producer of film and drama soundtracks and events. In 1987, he contributed to the film Hachikō Monogatari by both singing and composing music for its soundtrack.

=== Retirement plans and rejoining music ===
By 2008, Hayashi had decided to retire, but on October 23, 2008, he appeared at a concert to commemorate the 35th anniversary of his career at the Tokyo International Forum. With guests such as Sugiyama, Ueda, Inagaki, and Takeuchi (the latter of whom was invited as a secret guest), the support from his fans at the event changed Hayashi's mind about retiring. He returned to work as a producer and composer, collaborating with Sugiyama on the 2011 album Kiyotaka Sugiyama meets Tetsuji Hayashi Reunited. The following year, he wrote the song "Namidame no Alice" for Shiori Tamai, which became known as a "divine song" among fans. In 2018, he formed The Band Eight and began working as a performer within the band. In July of the same year, he started the "Song File Live" series, which delivers his hit songs to his fans, with Kiyotaka Sugiyama as the first guest.

In November 2021, he composed the song "Watching Over You" by Peach & Apricot, a duo formed by Mariya Takeuchi and Anri. This marked the first collaboration between Hayashi and Takeuchi since 1981's "Ichigo no Yuuwaku," and his first collaboration with Anri since 1983's "You Are Not Alone." In March 2023, his song "Hidarimune no Seiza" was included in the compilation album Pacific Breeze 2: Japanese City Pop, AOR & Boogie 1972-1986, compiled and released by Light in the Attic Records. In September 2023, VAP announced the album 50th Anniversary Special A Tribute of Hayashi Tetsuji: Saudade to be released on November 8, 2023. The album features multiple artists Hayashi had ties to, including Shoko Nakagawa, Akina Nakamori, and Kiyotaka Sugiyama. Prior to the album's release, Hayashi held his 50th anniversary concert on November 5, 2023, at the Tokyo International Forum to promote the album. The concert featured performances by S. Kiyotaka & Omega Tribe, Asako Toki and Emi Meyer.

== Artistry ==
Hayashi has stated that he didn't like traditional enka songs, describing them as having few melodic changes. He believed that songs should have more musicality. Collaborator Kiyotaka Sugiyama, who first met Hayashi during his time as the lead singer of S. Kiyotaka & Omega Tribe, stated that Hayashi's melodies sounded easy but were actually difficult to perform. Due to the resurgence of city pop in the 2010s and 2020s, songs he wrote, particularly "Mayonaka no Door," gained renewed popularity. In 2020, Indonesian singer and YouTuber Rainych covered the song, and it reached number 49 on the Oricon charts. During an interview with NHK, he said that he believed the reason for the song's resurgence was that people were now accustomed to streaming music.

== Discography ==
- Bruges (1973)
- Back Mirror (1977)
- Summer Wine (1980)
- Nine Stories ~Longtime Romance~ (1986)
- Time Flies (1988)
- Islands In The Stream (1990)
- Paris, Moscow, Beijing (1992)
- Pop × Art (1992)
- Yesterday Alone (2025)
