= Saint Four =

Japanese female idol group

Saint Four セイントフォー
- Origin: Tokyo, Japan
- Genres: J-pop; dance-pop
- Years active: 1984–1987; 2018–present
- Labels: Riv.Star Records; Solid Records
- Members: Saori Iwama; Noriko Hamada; Yukie Suzuki
- Past members: Yumiko Itaya; Jun Iwao
- Website: www.theater-project.com/company-1

Saint Four (セイントフォー, Seinto Fō) is a Japanese female idol group. Founded in 1984, the group was known for their color-coordinated outfits and use of acrobatics on stage.

== History ==
Saori Iwama, Noriko Hamada, Yukie Suzuki, and Yumiko Itaya were selected among 30,000 applicants by talent agency Nichigei Project (日芸プロジェクト, Nichigei Purojekuto) to form the idol group that would become Saint Four. The quartet made their debut in the 1984 film The Audition, which cost ¥4 billion yen to produce. Saint Four's debut single "Fushigi Tokyo Cinderella" (不思議Tokyoシンデレラ; "Magical Tokyo Cinderella") peaked at No. 35 on Oricon's singles chart and sold over 200,000 copies. Their second single "Taiyō wo Dakishimero" (太陽を抱きしめろ; "Embrace the Sun") sold over 150,000 copies while their debut album The Audition sold over 300,000 copies. The quartet inspired Kazuhiko Shimamoto to create the character team Battle Four (戦闘フォー, Sentō Fō) in his manga Blazing Transfer Student.

After the release of the group's third single "Heart Jack War" (ハートジャックWAR) and third album We're Saint Four: Saint Four III (We're Saint Four~セイントフォーIII~) in September 1985, Nichigei Project sued Riv.Star Records for nonpayment of royalties. In September 1986, the Tokyo District Court ordered Riv.Star Records to pay Nichigei Project ¥388 million in compensation. Itaya left the group that year and was replaced by Jun Iwao.

On January 18, 1987, after two years and two months of activity, Saint Four performed their final concert at Maison Franco-Japonaise in Shibuya before disbanding.

=== Post-disbandment ===
Following the disbandment of Saint Four, Iwama continued her career as an actress. Hamada and Suzuki formed the rock duo Pink Jaguar (ピンクジャガー, Pinku Jagā). The duo released two singles and one studio album before going their separate ways in 1989 and pursuing careers as actresses. After leaving Saint Four, Itaya released several nude gravure books and videos before getting married and leaving the entertainment industry for good. Iwao continued her career as an actress and anime voice actress under her real name Junko Iwao.

After interviewing Hamada and Suzuki, professional interviewer Gō Yoshida concluded that Saint Four was a scam, with the members paying a registration fee between ¥300,000 and ¥400,000, and they were not paid the monthly salary of ¥30,000. In addition, members were fined ¥100 for using certain words such as "E~" (え〜; lit. "Huh?"), "Usso~" (うっそ〜; lit. "Not true!"), and "Yada~" (やだ〜; lit. "No!").

On March 17, 2013, Iwama, Hamada, and Suzuki performed a reunion show at Kennedy House Ginza, marking their first show together in 26 years. While there were talks about a full Saint Four reunion, the TBS variety show Bakuho! The Friday (爆報! THE フライデー) announced on April 10, 2015 that Itaya could not be contacted.

=== Reunion ===
In 2018, Iwama, Hamada, and Suzuki reformed Saint Four as a trio and released two compilation albums on May 16. Toki no Tabibito (時の旅人; Time Travelers) consists of two new songs and nine self-covers while Complete Collection 1984–1986 compiles the group's classic songs. In addition, the trio performed their first reunion show at Kennedy House Ginza on June 17.

In August 2021, Saint Four announced the suspension of activities due to the COVID-19 pandemic.

== Members ==
=== Current members ===
- Saori Iwama (岩間 沙織, Iwama Saori) (born July 7, 1964) (1984–1987; 2018–present)

- Nickname: Fashionable Saori (ファッショナブル・サオリ)
- Color: Green

- Noriko Hamada (浜田 範子, Hamada Noriko) (born February 22, 1965) (1984–1987; 2018–present)

- Nickname: Dramatic Noriko (ドラマティック・ノリコ)
- Color: Pink

- Yukie Suzuki (鈴木 幸恵, Suzuki Yukie) (born May 15, 1966) (1984–1987; 2018–present)

- Nickname: Exciting Yukie (エキサイティング・ユキエ)
- Color: Blue

=== Former members ===
- Yumiko Itaya (板谷 祐三子, Itaya Yumiko) (born March 5, 1968) (1984–1986)

- Nickname: Passionate Yumiko (パッショネート・ユミコ)
- Color: Red

- Jun Iwao (いわお 潤, Iwao Jun) (born February 18, 1970) (1986–1987)

== Discography ==
=== Singles ===
List of singles, with selected chart positions
Title	Date	Peak chart positions	Sales (JPN)	RIAJ certification	Album
Title	Date	Oricon Singles Charts	Sales (JPN)	RIAJ certification	Album
"Fushigi Tokyo Cinderella"	November 5, 1984	35	200,000	Gold	The Audition
"Taiyō wo Dakishimero"	March 21, 1985	15	150,000		Taiyō wo Dakishimero
"Hi! Sensei"	July 21, 1985	35			We're Saint Four: Saint Four III
"Heart Jack War"	September 21, 1985	46			The Best of Saint Four

=== Studio albums ===
Year	Information	Oricon weekly peak position	Sales	RIAJ certification
1984	The Audition: Released: November 21, 1984; Label: Riv.Star Records; Formats: LP, cassette, CD	—	300,000	Gold
1985	Taiyō wo Dakishimero: Released: May 21, 1985; Label: Riv.Star Records; Formats: LP, cassette, CD	—		
1985	We're Saint Four: Saint Four III: Released: September 21, 1985; Label: Riv.Star Records; Formats: LP, cassette, CD	—		

=== Compilations ===
Year	Information	Oricon weekly peak position	Sales	RIAJ certification
1985	Saint Four Best Hits 14: Released: August 21, 1985; Label: Riv.Star Records; Formats: LP, cassette, CD	—		
1985	The Best of Saint Four: Released: November 21, 1985; Label: Riv.Star Records; Formats: LP, cassette, CD	—		
2002	My Colle! Saint Four Best: Released: October 17, 2002; Label: Pony Canyon; Formats: CD	—		
2018	Toki no Tabibito: Released: May 16, 2018; Label: Solid Records; Formats: CD, digital	225		
2018	Complete Collection 1984–1986: Released: May 16, 2018; Label: Solid Records; Formats: CD, digital	120		

== Filmography ==
=== Film ===
- The Audition (ザ・オーディション) (November 17, 1984)
- Yaru to Kya Yaru ze! Come Back Hero (やるときゃやるぜ! COME BACK HERO; I'll Do It When I Do It! Come Back Hero) (August 1987)
