= Noriko Shiina =

Japanese actress (born 1982)

- 椎名 法子
- Born: 22 November 1982 (age 43); Katano, Osaka, Japan
- Other name: shiina (as a singer)
- Occupations: Actress; tarento; singer
- Years active: 1997–
- Known for: "Aozora dake ga Sora janai"; Tokumei Kakarichō Hitoshi Tadano
- Height: 1.57 m (5 ft 2 in)
- Spouse: Kiyoshi Saito
- Musical career
- Genres: J-pop
- Instruments: Vocals; guitar
- Label: For Life Records

Noriko Shiina (椎名 法子, Shīna Noriko; born 22 November 1982, Japan) is a Japanese actress, tarento, and singer.

Shiina is represented with Someday. She graduated from Horikoshi High School. Shiina's husband is former footballer Kiyoshi Saito.

== Discography ==
=== Singles ===
Year	Title	Notes
1999	"Aozora dake ga Sora janai"	
1999	"Isu"	Gōgai!! Bakushō Dai Mondai ending theme; Lotte Shayuki advert song
2000	"Do Re Mi Fa So La Shi Do"	Lion Ban Watery Gel Deodorant advert song
2001	"P.S. Good-Bye"	shin D-ryo theme song
2001	"Ōkina anata chīsana watashi / Canaria"	"Ōkina anata chīsana watashi" used for Hey! Hey! Hey! ending theme and Chintai Jūtaku News Chintai advert
2002	"Koi no Fūsen / smile"	"Koi no Fūsen" used for Ax Music-Factory "Ax Power Play #061" theme song
2002	"propose"	Romihī ending theme
2009	"Dakara Warau 'nda"	As Noriko Shiina; ending themes for Saishū Keikoku! Takeshi no Hontō wa Kowai Katei no Igaku, Ima-chan no "Jitsuwa...", Masuda Onchū; Keikiizu Blue Tribz advert song

=== Albums ===
Year	Title
2002	shiina

=== Videography ===
Year	Title
2001	Premio

== Filmography ==
=== TV drama ===
Year	Title	Role	Network	Notes
1999	L×I×V×E	Sayaka Shimazaki	TBS	
1999	Best Friend	Mai Kano	TV Asahi	
2000	Densetsu no Kyōshi	Jū Ni-sha Gakuen student	NTV	
2000	Namida o fuite		Fuji TV	
2001	Platonic Sex	Mai	Fuji TV	
2002	Home & Away	Mikako	Fuji TV	Episode 8
2003	Anata no Jinsei o Hakobi shimasu	Toshiko Iwaki	TBS	
2004	Kekkon no Katachi	Sana Soma	NHK	
2006	Tokumei Kakarichō Hitoshi Tadano	Japan TV announcer, Hiroko Seo	TV Asahi	
2007	Otoko no Kosodate		ABC, TV Asahi	
2008	Murina Renai		KTV	Episode 1; Guest
2009	Tsure ga Utsu ni Narimashite	Kurokawa	NHK	
2010	Shōfu to Shukujo	Naomi	THK	
2010	Face Maker	Kanae Kashiwagi	YTV	

=== TV variety ===
Year	Title	Network	Notes
2002	Melodix!	TV Tokyo	MC
2003	Kinji rareta Asobi	Fuji TV	As Ana Magano in "Joshi-ana ga yame rarenai"
2007	Masuda Onchū	ABC	

=== Advertisements ===
Year	Title	Notes
1998	Lotte La France	
1999	Lotte Shayuki	
	Honda Clean 4	
2000	Lion Ban Select	Co-starred with Nana Katase and Risa Goto
2000	Lion Watery Gel	
2000	Alpen	
2001	Pizza-La Winter Club	

=== Internet series ===
Year	Title
2007	Ossu! Ore Bu

=== Films ===
Year	Title	Role
1999	GTO	Izumi Kawagoe
2005	Princess Raccoon	Monaka
2008	Tokumei Kakarichō Hitoshi Tadano: Saigo no Gekijō-ban	Hiroko Seo

=== Photobooks ===
Year	Title
2001	tabiato
2002	Nao ka"u aloha

=== Stage ===
Year	Title	Notes
2008	Kūkan Jelly: Neko-me Club	
2009	Kūkan Jelly: Neko-me Club 2 –Natsuda! Umida! Vacation da!–	
2009	Zapper Neppū-tai: Neppū Suteki Butai vol. 4 "Wakiyaku no Tsuki"	
2010	Zapper Neppū-tai: Neppū Suteki Butai vol. 6 "Value na Jikan"	
2010	Akihito Nakatsuru Lovers Vol. 2: Haiiro no Kanata	
2011	Zapper Neppū-tai: Neppū Futeki Butai vol. 4 "Trillion Monster	Scheduled guest
