= Masaki Ueda =

Japanese singer and composer (born 1949)

- 上田正樹
- Born: 7 July 1949 (age 76); Kyoto, Japan

Masaki Ueda (Japanese: 上田正樹; born 7 July 1949) is a Japanese R&B and soul singer and composer.

== Life and career ==
Born in Kyoto, the son of a doctor, Ueda spent part of his childhood with his grandparents in Himeji, Hyōgo, as both his parents became infected with tuberculosis. When his father died and his mother recovered and remarried he moved to Takayama City, Gifu. He became interested in music in 1966, after having attended a concert of The Animals in Nagoya, and subsequently formed his first student band, with whom he performed a folk repertoire.

While still a student at Gifu University, in 1972 Ueda made his record debut with the single "Kin'iro no taiyō ga moeru asa ni" ("In the morning when the golden sun burns"). In 1974 he formed a band, Masaki Ueda & South To South, with whom he recorded an album; the group disbanded in 1976 and Ueda reprised his solo career. Ueda's major hit was the 1983 song "Kanashii iro ya ne" (悲しい色やね, "Sad Colors"), whose lyrics in 1988 inspired a film with the same title directed by Yoshimitsu Morita, in which Ueda also appeared. His 1999 single "Hands of Time" became a hit in South Korea, selling over 200,000 copies. In 2001, Ueda's duet with Indonesian singer Reza Artamevia in the song "Forever Peace", also known as "Biar Menjadi Kenangan", topped the Indonesian singles chart. His song "Somewhere Sometime" was chosen as the theme song of the 2007 NHK drama series Shin Machiben. In 2022, he held a national tour to celebrate his 50 years of career.
