= Warabe (group) =

J-pop musical group (1982-1985)

- Warabe in 1982

Background information
- Origin: Japan
- Genre: J-pop
- Years active: 1982 – 1985
- Label: For Life Record

Warabe (わらべ) was a J-pop musical trio active between 1982 and 1985.

== History of the band ==
The group was established as part of the Net TV's variety show Kinchan no Doko Made Yaru no? hosted by Kinichi Hagimoto. The group consisted of Atsumi Kurasawa, Tomoko Takabe and Mami Takahashi and made the first appearance in the show in September 1982. Warabe's biggest hit was the song ""Moshimo Ashita ga..." ("If tomorrow...") which topped the Oricon Singles Chart for six weeks and was reported to have sold more than 970,000 copies.

In June 1983, the weekly magazine Focus published a photograph of Tomoko Takabe allegedly smoking on her bed. Following the incident she was suspended, and took part in the program on the phone expressing her remorse and singing " Medaka no Kyôdai"; her segment of the show recorded a massive 42 percent share of viewers. She was supposed to return but two months later Takabe's ex-boyfriend, who had provided the photo to the magazine, committed suicide, and she decided to withdraw from the program and from the group. The two remaining members eventually disbanded the group in 1985.

Warabe were number 9 on the 1984 Music Labo top pop singles artist chart.

== Group members ==
- Atsumi Kurasawa (Japanese: 倉沢 淳美, born 20 April 1967), nicknamed Kanae.
- Tomoko Takabe (Japanese: 高部 知子, born 27 August 1967), nicknamed Nozomi.
- Mami Takahashi (Japanese: 高橋 真美, born 20 September 1967), nicknamed Tamae.

== Discography ==
=== Singles ===
- "Medaka No Kyodai" (Japanese: めだかの兄妹) (1982). Oricon singles chart number 3. Music Labo singles chart number 6
- "Moshimo Ashita Ga..." (Japanese: もしも明日が…。) (1984). Oricon singles chart number 1. This song was number 2 on the 1984 Music Labo top pop singles annual chart.
- "Moshimo Ashita Ga... Ondo-hen" (Japanese: もしも明日が…。音頭編) (1984). Oricon singles chart number 45.
- "Tokei O Tomete" (Japanese: 時計をとめて) (1984). Oricon singles chart number 6. Music Labo singles chart number 8.

=== Albums ===
- 1983 : Nozomi, Kanae, Tamae - Medaka no Kyôdai
- 1984 : Moshi mo Ashita ga...
- 1995 : Medaka no Kyôdai (Compilation)
- 2011 : Imokin Trio & Warabe - Golden Best (Compilation)
