= S. Kiyotaka & Omega Tribe =

Japanese city pop band

- S. Kiyotaka & Omega Tribe c. 1983–1985; L–R: Kiyotaka Sugiyama, Takao Oshima, Shinji Takashima, Toshitsugu Nishihara, Kenji Yoshida, and Keiichi Hiroishi

Background information
- Also known as: Tony Taguchi & Cutie Panchos (1978–1979); Cutie Panchos (1979–1983)
- Origin: Tokyo, Japan
- Genres: Album-oriented rock; city pop
- Years active: 1978–1985; 2018–present
- Label: VAP
- Spinoff of: Omega Tribe
- Members: Kiyotaka Sugiyama; Shinji Takashima; Toshitsugu Nishihara; Takao Oshima; Kenji Yoshida
- Past members: Keiichi Hiroishi

S. Kiyotaka & Omega Tribe (杉山清貴&オメガトライブ, Sugiyama Kiyotaka & Omega Toraibu) is a Japanese band from Yokohama, Japan. It consists of lead vocalist Kiyotaka Sugiyama, rhythm guitarist Shinji Takashima, lead guitarist Kenji Yoshida, keyboardist Toshitsugu Nishihara, bassist Takao Oshima, drummer Keiichi Hiroishi.

The start of the Omega Tribe project, the band first came together as Cutie Panchos (きゅうてぃぱんちょす, Kiyuuti Panchosu) in 1978 consisting of high schoolers who frequented a live house. After their performance at the 19th and 20th Yamaha Popular Song Contests, they were scouted by Koichi Fujita, who produced their discography alongside composer Tetsuji Hayashi. During their three-year career, the band released five studio albums, Aqua City (1983), River's Island (1984), Never Ending Summer (1984), Another Summer (1985), and First Finale (1985). Their songs "Summer Suspicion" (1983) and "Futari no Natsu Monogatari" (1985) are considered Sugiyama's signature songs during his era as Omega Tribe's vocalist.

The band members did not participate in the recordings of the songs as they were instead performed by studio musicians, and the disconnect between the members and the production team eventually led to their breakup in 1985 at the peak of their popularity. The band have since had multiple reunion performances since their disbandment, but have not done any new recordings due to Fujita's death in 2009. They have been described as one of the bands that fueled the city pop sound.

== History ==
=== 1978–1983: Cutie Panchos ===
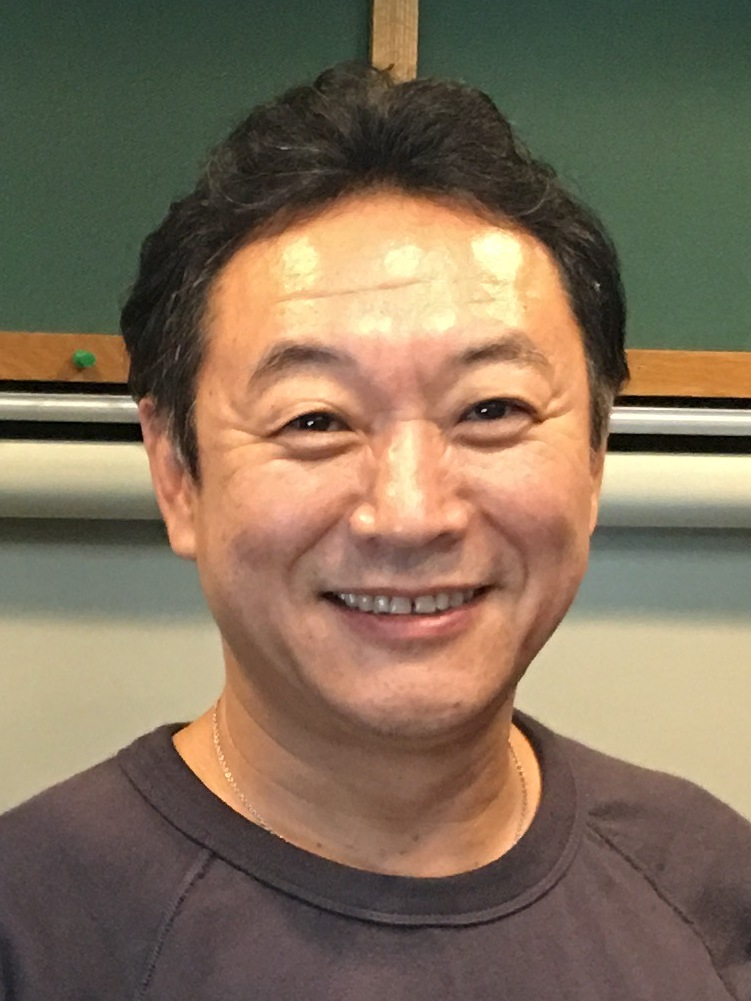
Singer Kiyotaka Sugiyama (pictured in 2019) refused to become a solo act after being scouted by producer Koichi Fujita.

The band that would become S. Kiyotaka & Omega Tribe was formed in December 1978 as Tony Taguchi & Cutie Panchos by Shinji Takashima, Kenji Yoshida, Masato Taguchi, and Keiichi Hiroishi. In 1979, Kiyotaka Sugiyama joined as their vocalist after previously providing vocals as a temporary member. By 1980, the name was shortened to Cutie Panchos with the formation of a new group consisting of 17 members. Later that year, Akira Senju joined the band as a keyboardist, replacing the previous keyboardist who had stopped due to exams, and the band entered the 20th Popcon with the song "Nori Okureta 747" that was written before Senju joining.

They were defeated in the preliminaries, and with their defeat, Senju left the band to pursue a solo debut through university. Mohri and Nagasawa later left the band to form Sugar in 1981. In 1982, bassist Takao Oshima and jazz keyboardist Toshitsugu Nishihara joined Cutie Panchos, and with them joining, the final lineup of Cutie Panchos was formed. Although they were defeated in the 20th Popcon, their performance caught the attention of producer Koichi Fujita. Fujita feared that the band's talent, especially Sugiyama's voice, would go to waste since they didn't win the 20th Popcon, and approached the band to play music that would be different from what they had played up to that point. Fujita had originally considered asking Sugiyama to become a solo artist, but Sugiyama refused as he didn't want to leave the band.

=== 1983–1984: Formation and debut ===
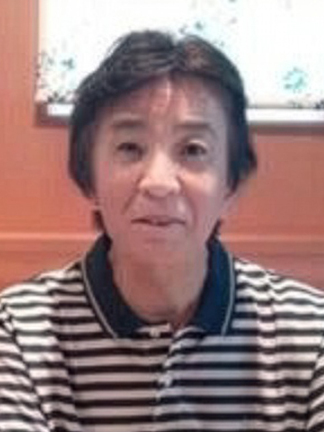
Tetsuji Hayashi (pictured in 2019) was scouted by Koichi Fujita to help compose the band's songs.

Fujita asked BMG Victor director Uji Okamura to help scout composer Tetsuji Hayashi to help with the band's songs. Hayashi and his lyricist, Chinfa Kan, initially presented the songs "Umikaze Tsushin" and "A.D. 1959" based on the band's soft rock background, but Fujita rejected the songs and asked for a piece that was "more Japanese" and melancholic, which resulted in "Summer Suspicion". Prior their debut, it was decided that the band would debut on the label VAP instead of BMG Victor, and that they would choose another name other than Cutie Panchos. The name Omega Tribe was suggested by Hawaiian DJ Kamasami Kong, but was among the bottom of the list out of multiple candidates. The members liked the name Tykes, but it was Fujita who chose the name Omega Tribe for the group.

A month before the release of the single, the song was performed by the band at the 12th Tokyo Music Festival on March 23, 1983 at Nakano Sunplaza. The band also appeared on the show Apple City 100 and promoted the song before its release. The band officially debuted with "Summer Suspicion" on April 21, 1983, and had their first charting at 100th place on the Oricon Singles Chart on May 23, 1983. The single peaked at 9th place on Oricon by August 22, 1983, with the song peaking at 39th on Oricon's end-of-the-year charts.

S. Kiyotaka & Omega Tribe released their debut album, Aqua City, on September 21, 1983, which peaked at 4th place on the Oricon Albums Chart. The next month, on October 21, 1983, they released their second single "Asphalt Lady" to a lackluster commercial performance, selling only 60,000 copies compared to the previous 360,000 copies of "Summer Suspicion". The song's performance led the production team to focus their efforts on better compositions for future songs.

=== 1984–1985: Final albums and disbandment ===
The band released their third single "Kimi no Heart wa Marine Blue" on January 21, 1984, which had a "sorrowful sound" and an image of the sea that was present "Summer Suspicion", with the single reaching 12th place on the Oricon charts. On March 21, 1984, the band released their sophomore album, River's Island. On October 21, 1984, they released "Riverside Hotel", riding on the popularity of "Kimi no Heart wa Marine Blue"; they later released their third album Never Ending Summer on December 21, 1984. The band started production of their fourth studio album by February 1985, cutting down on the orchestral and brass sounds and replacing it with the Moog Polymoog and the Yamaha DX7. They released the single, "Futari no Natsu Monogatari" on March 6, 1985, with the single peaking at number 4 on the Oricon Singles Chart.

Although at the peak of their popularity by the single's release, Sugiyama started a discussion about potentially disbanding due to a dissonance between the band members and the production team. Although on good terms, the difference in direction between the members and the team made them eventually support the disbandment unanimously. Takashima and Nishihara had expressed opposition to the disbandment before joining the rest of the members. Yoshida soon left in April 1985, with the band releasing their fourth album Another Summer on July 1, 1985. They notified Fujita of their decision, and although disappointed, he accepted knowing that Sugiyama wouldn't change his decision. He instead allowed Takashima and Nishihara to stay in the project in a successor band with a new vocalist.

The compilation album Single's History, released on October 23, 1985, was originally supposed to be their final album, but Hayashi felt dissatisfied having the band break up at the peak of their popularity. As a compromise, Hayashi asked for the band to record a final album for the sake of the fans. They began developing a final album by August, with the name for the final tour and album being suggested by Hayashi. The band began their First Finale Tour on October 4, releasing their fifth album First Finale on December 11 and disbanding by December 24, 1985.

=== 2018–present: Reunions and touring ===
With the resurgence of city pop, in the 2010s, VAP began releasing compilation albums more frequently. In 2019, they released Omega Tribe Groove, a compilation and remix album that included newly recorded vocals by the members. VAP also started producing remix versions of their discography in preparation for the band's 40th anniversary, beginning with Aqua City Remix in 2021 and ending with First Finale Remix in 2023.

The band has reunited several times since their disbandment but has not produced any new music since the passing of Fujita in 2009. In 2004, at Sugiyama's request, the band reunited for three performances called the First Finale 2, which included all the members including Yoshida. In 2013, they reunited again for the band's 30th anniversary. The band returned to touring in 2018, reuniting to perform at Hibiya Open-Air Concert Hall to commemorate their 35th anniversary in 2018 and later going on a tour from February 2 to April 21, 2019. In 2021, the band held a performance Tachikawa Stage Garden without a live audience due to the COVID-19 pandemic in Japan, with Takashima absent. In 2023, they announced their final tour to take place in Spring 2024. Drummer Keiichi Hiroishi was absent from the performances due to poor health, and he was replaced on the tour by drummer Yukio Ogawa.

On March 16, 2025, drummer Keiichi Hiroishi died due to a cerebral hemorrhage, prompting lead singer Kiyotaka Sugiyama to express his condolences. Months later, the band announced a memorial concert in his honor, which sold out the venue. Following the concert on July 19, 2025, the band revealed plans for a national memorial tour set to begin on September 12.

== Band members ==
=== Classic lineup ===
- Kiyotaka Sugiyama (杉山 清貴) – lead vocals (1983–1985, 2018–present)
- Shinji Takashima (高島 信二) – guitar (1983–1985, 2018–present)
- Toshitsugu Nishihara (西原 俊次) – keyboards (1983–1985, 2018–present)
- Takao Oshima (大島 孝夫) – bass (1983–1985, 2018–present)
- Keiichi Hiroishi (廣石 恵一) – drums (1983–1985, 2018–2025; died 2025)
- Kenji Yoshida (吉田 健二) – guitar (1983–1985, 2018–present)

=== Touring members ===
- Tetsuya Osaka (大阪 哲也) – keyboards (1984–1985, 2018–present)
- Junya Kondo (近藤 淳也) – saxophone, percussion (2018–present)
- Yukio Ogawa (小川 幸夫) – drums (2024–present)

== Discography ==
=== Studio albums ===
List of studio albums with chart positions and sales
Title	Album details	Peak chart positions
Title	Album details	Oricon
Aqua City	Released: September 21, 1983; Label: VAP; Formats: LP, cassette	4
River's Island	Released: March 21, 1984; Label: VAP; Formats: LP, cassette	3
Never Ending Summer	Released: December 21, 1984; Label: VAP; Formats: LP, cassette	8
Another Summer	Released: July 1, 1985; Label: VAP; Formats: LP, cassette	1
First Finale	Released: December 11, 1985; Label: VAP; Formats: LP, cassette, CD	1

== Awards and nominations ==
=== Tokyo Music Festival ===
Year	Nominee / work	Award	Result
1983	"Summer Suspicion"	Domestic Tournament Golden Apple Award	Won
1983	"Summer Suspicion"	World Tournament TBS Award	Won

== See also ==
- Omega Tribe
