= Kiyotaka Sugiyama =

Japanese singer-songwriter (born 1959)

Kiyotaka Sugiyama 杉山 清貴
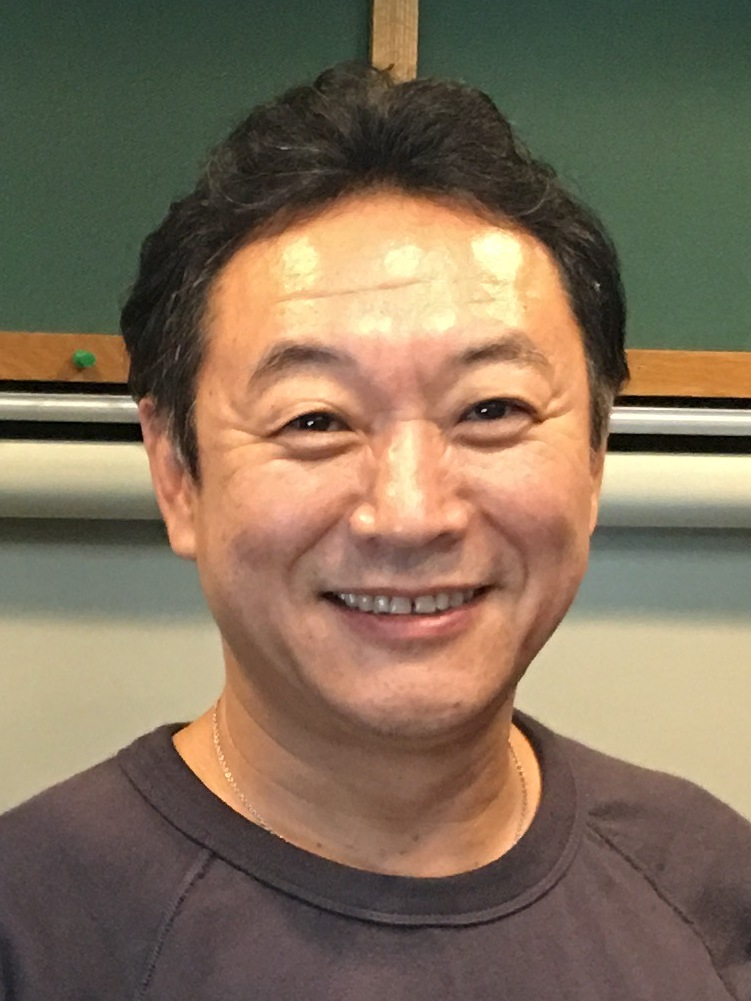
- Sugiyama in 2019

Background information
- Born: July 17, 1959 (age 67); Isogo-ku, Yokohama, Japan
- Origin: Yokohama, Japan
- Genres: City pop; soft rock; J-pop
- Occupation: Singer-songwriter
- Instrument: Acoustic guitar
- Years active: 1978–present
- Labels: VAP; Warner Music Japan; King Records
- Member of: S. Kiyotaka & Omega Tribe
- Website: islandafternoon.com
- Spouse: Yuko Yanagisawa (m. 1985, divorced)
- Children: 1

Japanese name
- Kanji: 杉山 清貴
- Hiragana: すぎやま きよたか
- Katakana: スギヤマ キヨタカ
Transcriptions
- Romanization: Sugiyama Kiyotaka

Kiyotaka Sugiyama (杉山 清貴, Sugiyama Kiyotaka; born July 17, 1959) is a Japanese singer-songwriter known for being the lead vocalist of S. Kiyotaka & Omega Tribe. Debuting in 1983 with the band, Sugiyama began his solo career in 1986 after the band's disbandment the previous year. As the lead singer of S. Kiyotaka & Omega Tribe, he was the lead voice on songs such as "Summer Suspicion" and "Futari no Natsu Monogatari", while as a solo artist he has had multiple hit songs including "Sayonara Ocean", "Saigo no Holy Night", and "Mizu no Naka no Answer".

Sugiyama has currently released a total of 27 albums throughout his solo career, with his debut album Beyond… (1986) reaching 1st place on the Oricon charts, with subsequent albums in the 80s also being in the top ten of the album charts. Sugiyama has been described as one of the artists who shaped city pop's image, utilizing newer synths and his vocals.

== Early life ==
Sugiyama was born on July 17, 1959, in Isogo-ku, Yokohama; his father was a police officer and his mother was a shamisen and dance teacher. He started listening to music at an early age after being inspired by western rock music like The Beatles, saving up money in order to buy their albums. His first instrument was an electric guitar, later buying an acoustic guitar after listening to Japanese folk music. He formed a band with his classmates in junior high and started writing songs, performing at a school festival in his third year. After he graduated from high school, he worked at a live house.

== Career ==
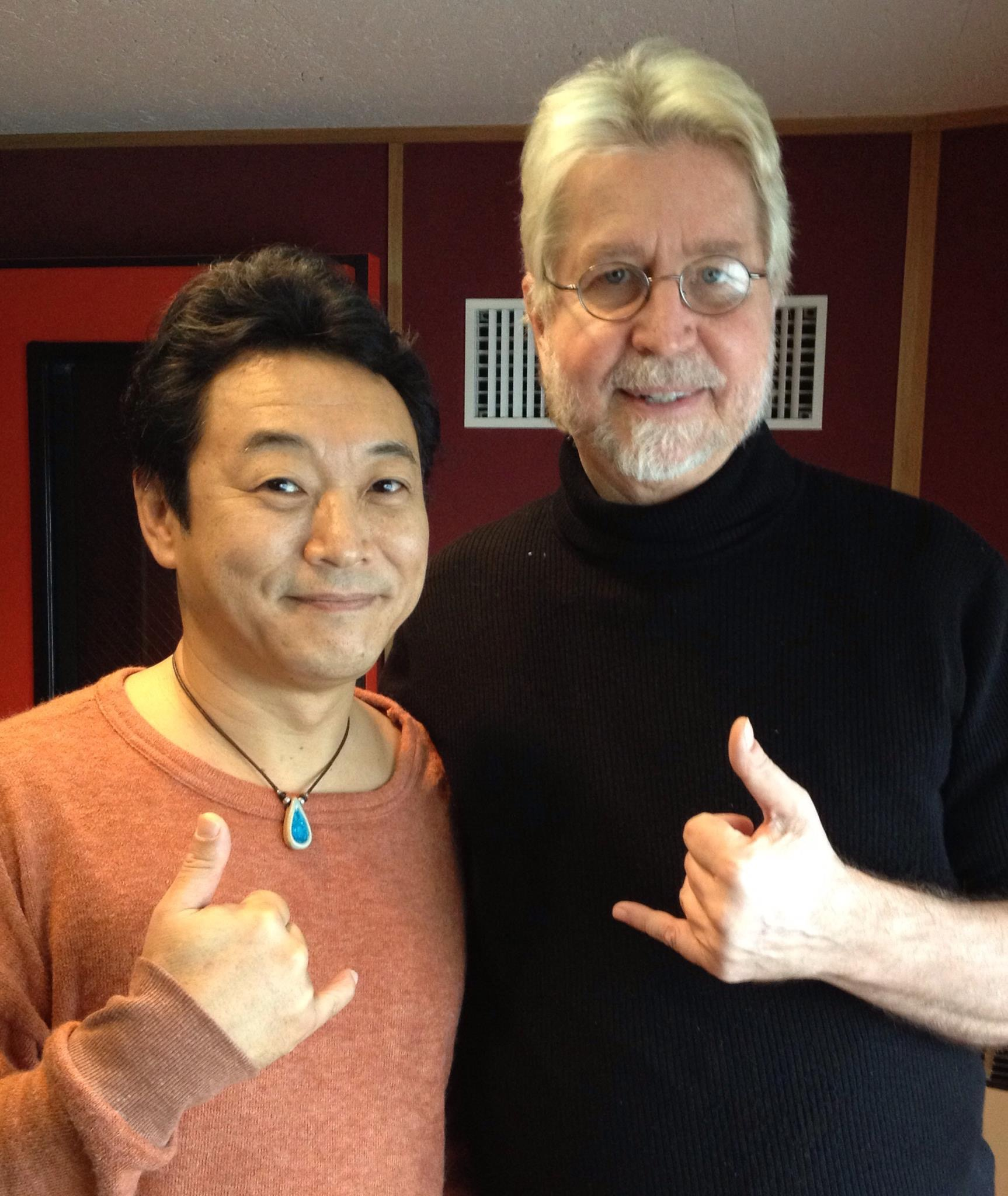
Sugiyama with DJ Kamasami Kong, who gave the name "Omega Tribe" to the group in the '80s.

In 1979, he joined the band Cutie Panchos, which was made of high schoolers who frequented a live house, becoming their lead vocalist. The band participated in the 19th and 20th Yamaha Popular Song Contests held in 1980, winning an award in the 19th Popcon but losing in the 20th Popcon. By 1982, the final lineup of Cutie Panchos was formed, with the band being scouted by Koichi Fujita; the band would debut as S. Kiyotaka & Omega Tribe with "Summer Suspicion" in 1983. The band lasted two years, breaking up at the peak of their popularity due to discontent from session musicians doing all of the recordings instead of the band members themselves.

After the disbandment of S. Kiyotaka & Omega Tribe, Sugiyama debut as a solo act in 1986 with the single "Sayonara Ocean" followed by his debut album, Beyond…, which peaked at 1st place on the Oricon Albums Chart. His follow-up single "Saigo no Holy Night", reached 2nd place on the Oricon Singles Chart. While a solo artist at VAP, he befriended fellow singer Momoko Kikuchi, portraying her brother in the 1986 movie Aidoru o Sagase. He released the singles "Mizu no Naka no Answer" and "Shade" in 1987 and "Kaze no Lonely Way" in 1988, all three reaching 1st place on the Oricon Singles Chart making them his only singles to be his number one singles. In 1989, he wrote the song "Last Train" for Carlos Toshiki & Omega Tribe's 1989 album Be Yourself, transferring to Warner Pioneer at the request of Triangle Production alongside Carlos Toshiki & Omega Tribe and later transferring from Triangle Production to Horipro.

On May 30, 1990, Sugiyama was transferred from VAP to Warner Music Japan and released his fifth album Sprinkle, reaching 1st place on the Oricon charts. In 1996, he started annually performing at Hibiya Open-Air Concert Hall during tours. In 2000, he was transferred back to VAP and later left Horipro to establish the company Masterwork Co., Ltd, which later became Island Afternoon Co., Ltd. In 2004, he and other members of S. Kiyotaka & Omega Tribe reunited for the first time for a concert.

In 2013, he released the album I Am Me which featured self covers of S. Kiyotaka & Omega Tribe and his solo career songs. In 2016, Sugiyama celebrated his 30th anniversary of his solo debut with a concert at Hibiya Open-Air Concert Hall and released the album Ocean. The next year, he released the album Driving Music. In 2018, Sugiyama and S. Kiyotaka & Omega Tribe reunited for a national tour for the band's 35th anniversary, with Sugiyama also having a solo tour for his own anniversary of debut. In 2020, Sugiyama released the album Rainbow Planet, his first album in three years, but had to postpone a tour due to the COVID-19 pandemic in Japan. In 2023, the 40th anniversary of his debut with S. Kiyotaka & Omega Tribe, he released the album Freedom and the compilation album All Time Best which compiled various singles throughout his career.

== Artistry ==
Sugiyama was inspired by The Beatles and other western rock music after listening to them at a friend's house as a child, switching his instrument from a shamisen to guitar after being inspired by Beatles member George Harrison and his Fender Stratocaster. He was also interested by Japanese folk rock, including artists Takuro Yoshida and Yōsui Inoue. In high school, he became obsessed with American rock and was in a school band that mimicked the style of Santana. While as part of Cutie Panchos, he and the band were inspired by The Doobie Brothers and mimicked their style. He also was a smoker and drinker in an attempt to get his voice deeper like Otis Redding, quitting both in 2011 in order to help his voice.

== Personal life ==
Sugiyama met former singer Yuko Yanagisawa, the sister of comedian Shingo Yanagisawa, in 1980, with the two marrying in 1985 and having a daughter, Maho, the next year. In 1990, the family emigrated to Hawaii, living in Hawaiʻi Kai, obtaining permanent residency in 1992 while Sugiyama travelled to and from Japan and Los Angeles to record. During his time in Hawaii, he learned about surfing and began practicing bodyboarding. Sugiyama and Yanagisawa divorced, with Sugiyama returning his permanent residency and moving back to Japan in 2006 while Yanagisawa and Maho stayed in the United States.

Sugiyama is known for his use of sunglasses during performances and for his public image. He first began wearing sunglasses to hide a swollen face due to heavy drinking the night before a performance for S. Kiyotaka & Omega Tribe. The crowd reacted positively to the style, and he began using sunglasses to the point it where it became his trademark look. During his later career, he began taking off his sunglasses and showing his face without them.

Sugiyama is a fan of anime, his early aspirations as a child was to become a manga artist prior to becoming a musician. He has written multiple songs based on being inspired from anime; he created the song "Boys of Eternity" for the 1988 OVA Shounan Bakusouzoku and 2022 single "Nightmare" was inspired by the anime Call of the Night, writing the song as if it was its theme song.

== Discography ==
=== Studio albums ===
List of studio albums with chart positions
Title	Album details	Peak chart positions	
Title	Album details	Oricon	Billboard
Beyond…	Released: July 2, 1986; Label: VAP; Format: LP, CD	1	47
Realtime to Paradise	Released: March 21, 1987; Label: VAP; Format: LP, CD	1	50
Kona Weather	Released: December 19, 1987; Label: VAP; Format: LP, CD	2	51
Here & There	Released: May 17, 1989; Label: VAP; Format: LP, CD	2	—
Listen to My Heart	Released: November 8, 1989; Label: VAP; Format: CD	4	—
Sprinkle	Released: May 30, 1990; Label: Warner Pioneer; Format: CD	1	—
Moonset – Yasashina Narumade	Released: June 12, 1991; Label: Warner Music Japan; Format: CD	4	—
Island Afternoon	Released: June 10, 1992; Label: Warner Music Japan; Format: CD	7	—
Kanata Kara no Kaze	Released: September 25, 1992; Label: Warner Music Japan; Format: CD	19	—
Add Water	Released: July 25, 1994; Label: WEA Japan; Format: CD	14	—
Rhythm from the Ocean	Released: September 25, 1995; Label: WEA Japan; Format: CD	29	—
Rainbow Shave Ice	Released: July 10, 1996; Label: WEA Japan; Format: CD	30	—
Honolulu City Lights	Released: June 25, 1997; Label: WEA Japan; Format: CD	81	—
Harvest Story	Released: October 25, 1997; Label: WEA Japan; Format: CD	91	—
Ocean Side Company	Released: July 21, 2000; Label: VAP; Format: CD	40	—
Zampa	Released: July 21, 2001; Label: VAP; Format: CD	67	—
Heaven's Shore	Released: November 21, 2001; Label: VAP; Format: CD	96	—
Aloe Vera 99%	Released: July 24, 2002; Label: VAP; Format: CD	80	—
Hula Moon Sessions	Released: April 23, 2003; Label: VAP; Format: CD	44	—
Shima Kara no Tegami, Umi Kara no Henji.	Released: December 3, 2003; Label: VAP; Format: CD	76	—
Bay Area Kids	Released: August 4, 2004; Label: VAP; Format: CD	78	—
The Sunshine Band	Released: July 26, 2006; Label: VAP; Format: CD	63	—
Favorite Eternal Numbers – Desperado	Released: July 25, 2007; Label: VAP; Format: CD	82	—
Style	Released: December 19, 2007; Label: VAP; Format: CD	112	—
Favorite Eternal Numbers II – Asu ni Kakeru Hashi	Released: November 5, 2008; Label: VAP; Format: CD	73	100
Veteran	Released: July 17, 2009; Label: VAP; Format: CD	49	66
Island Afternoon II Pacific Rim	Released: February 10, 2010; Label: VAP; Format: CD	49	80
Kiyotaka Sugiyama Meets Tetsuji Hayashi Reunited	Released: April 6, 2011; Label: VAP; Format: Digital download, streaming, CD	54	50
I Am Me	Released: April 17, 2013; Label: King Records; Format: Digital download, streaming, CD	25	20
Island Afternoon III Da Kine of Da Buds	Released: June 25, 2014; Label: King Records; Format: Digital download, streaming, CD	60	62
Ocean	Released: July 6, 2016; Label: King Records; Format: Digital download, streaming, CD	34	30
Driving Music	Released: July 19, 2017; Label: King Records; Format: Digital download, streaming, CD	24	23
My Song My Soul	Released: July 19, 2017; Label: King Records; Format: Digital download, streaming, CD	21	16
Rainbow Planet	Released: May 13, 2020; Label: King Records; Format: Digital download, streaming, CD	10	9
Freedom	Released: May 10, 2023; Label: King Records; Format: Digital download, streaming, CD	11	9

== Filmography ==
Year	Title	Role	Notes
1986	Aidoru o Sagase	Yasuo Fujitani	Special appearance
2003	Heart of the Sea	Himself	Made for the Japan Surfing Federation
