= Nippon Television Music Festival =

Japanese music award

- Awarded for: Outstanding achievements in the record industry
- Country: Japan
- Presented by: Nippon Television
- First award: 1975
- Final award: 1990
- Website: http://www.ntv.co.jp/

The Nippon Television Music Festival (日本テレビ音楽祭, Nihon Terebi Ongaku-sai) was an annual music awards show produced by Nippon Television.

== Grand Prix winners ==
| Year | Winner | Song | Ref. |
|---|---|---|---|
| 1975 | Hiroshi Itsuki | "Chikumagawa" (千曲川) | |
| 1976 | Goro Noguchi | "Kirameki" (きらめき) | |
| 1977 | Sayuri Ishikawa | "Notohantō" (能登半島) | |
| 1978 | Pink Lady | "Southpaw" (サウスポー) | |
| 1979 | Hideki Saijo | "Hop Step Jump" (ホップ・ステップ・ジャンプ) | |
| 1980 | Aki Yashiro | "Ame no Bojō" (雨の慕情) | |
| 1981 | Akira Terao | "Ruby no Yubi Wa" (ルビーの指環) | |
| 1982 | Hiromi Iwasaki | "Seibo-tachi no Lullaby" (聖母たちのララバイ) | |
| 1983 | Takashi Hosokawa | "Yagiri no Watashi" (矢切の渡し) | |
| 1984 | Akina Nakamori | "Jikkai (1984)" (十戒 (1984)) | |
| 1985 | Masahiko Kondō | "Yumehan" (夢絆) | |
| 1986 | Akina Nakamori | "Desire -Jōnetsu-" (DESIRE -情熱-) | |
| 1987 | Masahiko Kondō | "Orokamono" (愚か者) | |
| 1988 | No ceremony | | |
| 1989 | Hikaru Genji | "Taiyō ga Ippai" (太陽がいっぱい) | |
| 1990 | Grand Prix is abolished | | |

== See also ==
- Star Tanjō!
