= Summer Suspicion =

1983 single by S. Kiyotaka & Omega Tribe

Single by S. Kiyotaka & Omega Tribe

from the album Aqua City
- B-side: "Nagisa no Sea-dog" (渚のSea-dog)
- Released: April 21, 1983
- Genre: Album-oriented rock; city pop
- Length: 4:34
- Label: VAP
- Composer(s): Tetsuji Hayashi
- Lyricist(s): Chinfa Kan
- Producer(s): Koichi Fujita

S. Kiyotaka & Omega Tribe singles chronology
"Summer Suspicion" (1983)	"Asphalt Lady" (1983)

Music video
- "Summer Suspicion" on YouTube

"Summer Suspicion" (Japanese: サマー・サスピション, Hepburn: Samā Sasupishon) is the debut single by Japanese band S. Kiyotaka & Omega Tribe released by VAP on April 21, 1983. Produced by Koichi Fujita and written by Tetsuji Hayashi and Chinfa Kan, the song is made to have a "domestic Japanese melancholy" by the request of Fujita after rejecting two previous songs by Hayashi and Kan. It peaked at 9th place on the Oricon Singles Chart in 1983.

== Background and release ==
Tetsuji Hayashi, an industry veteran, was contacted by BMG Victor director Uji Okamura to be a composer for a new band called Cutie Panchos (きゅうてぃぱんちょす, Kyutipanchosu). He was introduced to producer Koichi Fujita, who had scouted the band from their performance at the 1980 Yamaha Popular Song Contest, and Hayashi was tasked to create a song for their debut. Working with lyricist Chinfa Kan, they created the songs "Umikaze Tsushin" (海風通信) and A.D. 1959, both based on the band's yacht rock sound, but the songs were rejected by Fujita who wanted a song that was "more Japanese" and melancholic, more akin to Southern All Stars.

With an image of the summer and the sea seen at the time from magazines such as Brutus and Popeye, Hayashi and Kan wrote "Summer Suspicion" to fit Fujita's view of the band, though Fujita himself did not know what type of music would be made until the completion of the song. The band's image of the sea was also present in the record jackets, with the jackets of both "Summer Suspicion" and later Aqua City having none of the members present, but instead, the beach.

During recording, Fujita made lead singer Kiyotaka Sugiyama re-record vocals several times in order to get the right vocal quality that Fujita wanted. Before the release of the single, it was decided that instead of being called Cutie Panchos, it would be renamed to S. Kiyotaka & Omega Tribe, with the label that would be debuting them changing from BMG Victor to VAP, which had started two years prior.

The B-side, "Nagisa no Sea-dog", is a revised version of the song "Furafura Natsu Yōki", which was made by the band while as Cutie Panchos.

== Composition ==
The song has been described as a "uniquely domestic Japanese melancholy" due to Hayashi's composition, based around the album-oriented rock at the time. Chinfa Kan wrote the lyrics without any mentions of the beach or ocean, but instead, wrote the lyrics about two lovers are in a car during a drive.

== Commercial performance ==
Upon release, the single was a hit and debuted at 100th place on the Oricon Singles Chart on May 23, 1983, entering the top ten of the chart on August 22, 1983 and peaking at 9th place. The song peaked at 39th place for Oricon's end of the year charts. The song made its first appearances on the shows The Top Ten (ザ・トップテン) and The Best Ten (ザ・ベストテン) on July 11, 1983 and August 4, 1983. It peaked at 8th place on The Top Ten and 9th place on The Best Ten, with the song being at 53rd place on the end of the year charting from The Best Ten.

The song was awarded two Tokyo Music Festival awards, the Domestic Tournament Golden Apple Award after their performance on March 23, 1983 and the World Tournament TBS Award on March 27, 1983. The single was certified gold by the Recording Industry Association of Japan.

== Performances and other usage ==
A month before the release of the single, the song was performed by the band at the 12th Tokyo Music Festival on March 23, 1983 at Nakano Sunplaza. The band also appeared on the show Apply City 100 (アップルシティ500) and promoted the song before its release. During the groups First Finale Tour in 1985, "Summer Suspicion" was the last song performed on the set list; a recording of the song is published on VAP's YouTube as the official video.

Sugiyama has covered the song multiple times in his live albums throughout the years, including an orchestral version with Akira Senju, who was previously in Cutie Panchos before leaving in 1980. The song was also covered by Hayashi on his 1988 album Time Flies, as well as being covered in English by American singers Jon Otis, on Beach Pops for You, and Joey McCoy, on Summer Time Memories.

In 1992, a thoroughbred racehorse from the Shadai Stallion Station was named Summer Suspicion (マーサスピション) after the song, making its debut in 1995 and winning the Aoba Sho that same year.

== Track listing ==
Single
No.	Title	Lyrics	Music	Arrangement	Length
1.	"Summer Suspicion"	Chinfa Kan	Tetsuji Hayashi	Hayashi	4:34
2.	"Nagisa no Sea-dog (渚のSea-dog)"	Showichi Yoshida (as Show)	Kiyotaka Sugiyama	Tsugutoshi Gotō	3:56

== Charts ==
=== Weekly charts ===
Chart (1983)	Peak position
Oricon Singles Chart	9

=== Year-end charts ===
Chart (1983)	Peak position
Oricon	39

== See also ==
- 1983 in Japanese music
