= List of city pop artists =

The following is a list of artists and bands associated with the city pop music genre (not necessarily solely city pop artists). While the genre is associated with the 1970s and 1980s, there are a few artists who are associated with the genre despite not being active until after the peak period.

Groups and artists with aliases are listed by the first letter in their name, and individuals are listed by their surname.

- AB'S
- Yasuhiro Abe
- Yasuko Agawa
- Anri
- Tomoko Aran
- Nobuo Ariga
- Maria Asahina
- Awesome City Club
- Mami Ayukawa
- Benzo
- The Boom
- Bread and Butter
- Buzz
- Caoli Cano
- Carlos Toshiki & Omega Tribe
- Carnation
- Casiopea
- Cero
- Char
- Cindy
- Circus
- Jake H. Concepcion
- EPO
- Fluid
- Fujii Kaze
- Junk Fujiyama
- Toko Furuuchi
- Hiromi Go
- Good Bye April
- Great 3
- Yoshiko Goshima
- Gospellers
- Naoko Gushima
- Gwinko
- Kingo Hamada
- Happy End
- Miyuki Hatakeyama
- Kumiko Hara
- Tetsuji Hayashi
- Hi-Fi Set
- Eiko Hiraiwa
- Junko Hirotani
- Hitomitoi
- Atsuko Hiyajo
- Mai Hoshimura
- Haruomi Hosono
- Ice
- Hiroaki Igarashi
- Mari Iijima
- Masanori Ikeda
- Miki Imai
- Junichi Inagaki
- Akira Inoue
- Mutsumi Inoue
- Shōzō Ise
- Ayumi Ishida
- Akemi Ishii
- Ginji Ito
- Mayumi Itsuwa
- Hiromi Iwasaki
- Asami Kado
- Toshiki Kadomatsu
- Kaita
- Hiroshi Kamayatsu
- Kimiko Kasai
- Kazuhiko Katō
- Naomi Kawashima
- Ritsuko Kazami
- Momoko Kikuchi
- Keiko Kimura
- The King Tones
- Jin Kirigaya
- Kirinji
- Kaori Kishitani
- Takao Kisugi
- Izumi Kobayashi
- Yurie Kokubu
- Chu Kosaka
- Makoto Kubota
- Yoji Kubota
- Sayuri Kume
- Ruiko Kurahashi
- Kengo Kurozumi
- Seishiro Kusunose
- Masahiro Kuwana
- Yoko Kuzuya
- Lamp
- Lily
- Lucky Tapes
- Magokoro Brothers
- Takako Mamiya
- Keiko Maruyama
- Miki Matsubara
- Seiko Matsuda
- Noriko Matsumoto
- Takashi Matsumoto
- Kiyonori Matsuo
- Makoto Matsushita
- Masataka Matsutoya
- Yumi Matsutoya
- Yoshitaka Minami
- Moomin
- Mother Goose
- Keiko Murakoshi
- Kunio Muramatsu
- Kazuhito Murata
- Meiko Nakahara
- Rie Nakahara
- Akina Nakamori
- Hiroyuki Namba
- never young beach
- Atsuko Nina
- Mikiko Noda
- Goro Noguchi
- Nona Reeves
- Yoko Oda
- Junko Ohashi
- Taeko Ohnuki
- Yoshiyuki Ohsawa
- Eiichi Ohtaki
- Original Love
- Hiromi Ōta
- Amii Ozaki
- Kenji Ozawa
- Paris Match
- Pizzicato Five
- Platinum 900
- Rainych
- Rajie
- Round Table
- Ryusenkei
- S. Kiyotaka & Omega Tribe
- Sadistics
- Ryuichi Sakamoto
- Kenjiro Sakiya
- Hideki Saijo
- Motoharu Sano
- Hiroshi Sato
- Nanako Sato
- Seiko Sato
- Sentimental City Romance
- The Shamrock
- Takako Shirai
- Shōgun
- Mayo Shono
- Kumi Showji
- Sing Like Talking
- Smooth Ace
- Tomoko Soryo
- Southern All Stars
- Spank Happy
- Spicysol
- Stardust Revue
- Kaoru Sudō
- Sugar Babe
- Sugar Soul
- Masamichi Sugi
- Kiyotaka Sugiyama
- Masayuki Suzuki
- Shigeru Suzuki
- Toru Suzuki
- Yasuhiro Suzuki
- T-Square
- Michiko Takada
- Yukihiro Takahashi
- Hiroyuki Takami
- Masayoshi Takanaka
- Hiroshi Takano
- Mariya Takeuchi
- Yumi Tanimura
- Akira Terao
- Tin Pan Alley
- Hitomi Tohyama
- Asako Toki
- Tokyo Q Channel
- Tomita Lab
- Carlos Toshiki
- Tazumi Toyoshima
- Masaki Ueda
- Kanako Wada
- Machiko Watanabe
- Shinpei Watanabe
- Wink
- Junko Yagami
- Momoe Yamaguchi
- Sumiko Yamagata
- Tatsuhiko Yamamoto
- Ryohei Yamanashi
- Mai Yamane
- Tatsuro Yamashita
- Yasuha
- Yellow Magic Orchestra
- Yogee New Waves
- Yutaka Yokokura
- Minako Yoshida
- Yoshino Fujimal
