= 56709 =

Cocktail bar in Queens, New York

- Interactive map of the 56709 area

General information
- Location: 42-45 27th Street, Queens, New York, United States
- Coordinates: 40.749°N 73.9407°W

56709 is a city pop–themed bar in Long Island City of Queens in New York City. Named after a lyric in "Telephone Number" by Junko Ohashi, it serves cocktails based around city pop hits and musicians and is decorated in memorabilia from eighties Japan. In addition to food and drink, it also hosts DJ sets.

== History ==
56709 opened on June 12, 2025 in a space behind the Taiwanese restaurant Gulp, formerly occupied by 929, a Cantopop and Mandopop–themed bar. Established by the same team, 56709 had been envisioned as a "sister spot" to 929, continuing its mission of "celebrating music, cocktails and Asian pop culture."

Chen Haoran, one of the co-founders of 929 and Gulp, came up with the name after looking through his city pop collection, putting on Ohashi's record, and listening to its chorus, which included the numbers "5–6–7–0–9."
