= 929 (bar) =

Cocktail bar in New York City

- Interactive map of the 929 area

General information
- Location: 56 E 41st Street 1st Floor, Manhattan, New York, United States
- Coordinates: 40.7517°N 73.9789°W

929 is a Cantopop and Mandopop–themed cocktail bar in New York City. Originally established in Long Island City, Queens, it moved to Hue House in Midtown Manhattan in 2025.

== History ==
929 was founded by Chen Haoran, Sean Yang, and Jeff Liu. Chen had moved to the United States when he was 11 and stayed connected to his roots through his music collection. As adults, he, Yang, and Liu decided to found an establishment honoring the music of their upbringing.

929 opened on May 6, 2023 in Long Island City; its opening party included a lion dance. It launched simultaneously with Gulp, a Taiwanese restaurant which Chen co-owns with William Guo. Both were opened in the same building, with the 929 hidden behind a curtain inside of Gulp. Paying homage to Cantopop and Mandopop of the eighties and nineties, it was bedecked in posters and memorabilia of Hong Kong singers like Faye Wong, and each cocktail on its menu was named after hit songs.

In June 2025, 929's Long Island City location closed, after which the space was repurposed for 56709, a city pop–themed bar and 929's "sister spot." Later, in November, the teams behind 929 and Gulp created Hue House, an Asian cultural hub in Midtown which included a third Gulp location, a new location for 929, as well as other Asian establishments.
