= Atsuko Hiyajo =

Japanese singer (born 1971)

Atsuko Hiyajo 比屋定 篤子
- Born: 24 December 1971 (age 54); Naha, Okinawa, Japan
- Genre: Pop
- Occupation: Singer
- Instrument: Vocals
- Years active: 1997–present
- Labels: Sony Music Entertainment Japan; Happiness Records

Atsuko Hiyajo (Japanese: 比屋定 篤子, Hepburn: Hiyajō Atsuko; born 24 December 1971) is a Japanese singer and radio personality. Born in Naha, she performed for a band while at Musashino Art University, as well as her own concerts in Tokyo. Making her major label debut in 1997, she released several albums and singles with Epic Records Japan and Sony Music Entertainment Japan in the 1990s and 2000s. Following her return to Okinawa, she began working as an independent musician, collaborating with Ryusenkei and other musicians, and served as the Wednesday host for RBC iRadio's At BBS. One of her songs, "Maware Maware", received renewed popularity from the city pop boom of the 2010s.

== Biography ==
Hiyajo was born on 24 December 1971 in Naha and was educated at Okinawa Prefectural Naha High School and Musashino Art University. She performed for a band and joined a Latin Music Research Society during her time at university.

Hiyajo's music career began when she started performing her own concerts in Tokyo and composing original content. In 1997, she released her first major-label release with "Koyoi Kono Mama". One of her songs, "Mebius" (1998), was the ending theme of the TBS travel show Sekai Ururun Taizaiki. In addition to her singles, she released three albums with Epic Records Japan and Sony Music Entertainment Japan. Writing for Popeye, Ryohei Matsunaga remarked that "Hiyajo's expansive, soaring vocals possess a timeless appeal that transcends fleeting trends—a voice instantly recognizable even from a distance."

Hiyajo returned to Okinawa in 2001, but continued to make live performances and newer musical releases. She collaborated with Ryusenkei, with one example being the song "Natural Woman" (2009). In 2015, she released an album with Yuko Sato, Ryukyu Standard, through Tuff Beats; covering Ryukyuan children's songs, it was described by Eiko Kamoshida of Intoxicate as "embod[ying] a deep sense of nostalgia for Okinawa". She performed "Okinawa Wawawa", a 2016 ending theme for Shimajirō no Wow!. In 2017, she released her album Kaze to Uroko. She also formed the trio Fin-Tong with Hiroaki Sugawara and Shigeharu Sasago.

Outside of her career as a musical artist, Hiyajo has worked as a radio DJ, once serving as the Wednesday host for RBC iRadio's At BBS.

Some of Hiyajo's music has regained popularity amidst the city pop boom of the 2010s. Such growing demand from the city pop boom resulted in a 2017 seven-inch single re-release of her 1998 song "Maware Maware". "Maware Maware" became popular after the city pop boom came to South Korea, with Matsunaga attributing its popularity to the efforts of Japanese musician Yohei Hasegawa. It also appeared in the 2024 city pop compilation City Pop Groovy '90s: Girls & Boys. Additionally, her album Sasayakareta Yume no Hanashi was re-released by Sony Music Japan in 2022 as part of their Aldelight City Pop Collection series, and received a vinyl re-release as part of the City Pop on Vinyl 2026 series in July 2026.

== Discography ==
=== Albums ===
Title	Details
Nostalgia (のすたるじあ)	Released: 12 December 1997; Label: Epic Records Japan
Sasayakareta Yume no Hanashi (ささやかれた夢の話)	Released: 20 February 1999; Label: Sony Music Associated Records
Lua Laranja (ルア・ラランジャ)	Released: 1 October 1999; Label: Sony Music Associated Records
Hiyajō (ひやじょう)	Released: 20 February 2004; Label: Happiness Records
Live+ (stylized as LIVE +)	Released: 3 May 2006; Label: Happiness Records
A Million Smiles (in all-caps)	Released: 21 November 2007; Label: Happiness Records
Kinō to Chigau Kyō: Hiyajōatsuko Best & Rare (昨日と違う今日～比屋定篤子ベスト&レア)	Released: 23 November 2016; Label: Sony Music Direct
Kaze to Uroko (風と鱗)	Released: 13 December 2017; Label: Happiness Records

=== Singles ===
Title	Details
"Koyoi Kono Mama" (今宵このまま)	Released: 21 June 1997; Label: Epic Records Japan
"Kimi no Sumu Machi ni Tonde Ikitai" (君の住む街にとんで行きたい)	Released: 22 October 1997; Label: Epic Records Japan
"Sweet Rhapsody"	Released: 22 April 1998; Label: Epic Records Japan
"Maware Maware" (まわれ まわれ)	Released: 1 August 1998; Label: Sony Music Associated Records
"Mebius" (メビウス)	Released: 21 November 1998; Label: Sony Music Associated Records
"Nanairo Shinwa" (七色神話)	Released: 23 July 1999; Label: Sony Music Associated Records
"Orenji-iro no Gogo ni" (オレンジ色の午後に)	Released: 22 September 1999; Label: Sony Music Associated Records
