= Yasuko Agawa =

Japanese singer and actress

- 阿川 泰子
- Born: 佐藤 康子; Yasuko Satō; 16 October 1951 (age 74); Kamakura, Japan
- Other name: Tomoe Mari
- Occupations: Singer; actress; television personality
- Musical career
- Genres: Jazz
- Instrument: Vocals
- Labels: Victor Entertainment; Nippon Crown

Yasuko Agawa (Japanese: 阿川 泰子, Hepburn: Agawa Yasuko; born 16 October 1951) is a Japanese singer, actress, and television personality. Born in Kamakura, she drew inspiration from music that she listened to while recuperating from a childhood illness. After spending a year at the Bungakuza Theatre Institute, she had a brief acting career before leaving due to creative differences. She became a jazz vocalist for clarinetist Shoji Suzuki, before releasing dozens of solo albums with Victor Entertainment. She has achieved widespread popularity in the Japanese jazz scene, and her music has attained enduring popularity among DJs and appeared in several city pop compilations. She was also a regular on the Nippon Television talk show Oshare 30-30.

== Biography ==
=== Early life and acting career ===
Yasuko Agawa was born Yasuko Satō (佐藤 康子, Satō Yasuko). on 16 October 1951 (Note: When she made her debut in 1978, her management agency—acting on its own directives—listed her birth year as 1953.) in Kamakura, the only daughter of a Yōga painter based in the city. She often moved schools, being raised in Yuigahama and, from the third grade of elementary school onward, Naka-ku, Nagoya. Initially, she aspired to become a competitive swimmer and enrolled in Sugiyama Jogakuen Junior High School—a prestigious institution renowned for its swimming program. She often stayed home due to her childhood illness, listening to music that would inspire her future career; in a Town News interview, she recalled: "For humans, negatives can become positives. Even the jazz and FEN (Far East Network) that I listened to while holed up at home have become fuel for my current work". She subsequently graduated from Sugiyama Jogakuen Senior High School.

Agawa studied at the Bungakuza Theatre Institute, where she was part of the 12th class and was a classmate of Yūsaku Matsuda, but withdrew after one year. She began an acting career, portraying Keiko Nonomiya in Evil of Dracula (1974), Kida's daughter in Prophecies of Nostradamus (1974), and Yuri Yamamoto in Terror of Mechagodzilla (1975). She also had minor roles in Karei-naru Ichizoku (1974) and Seishun no Mon (1975). She also appeared in television dramas, including Taiyō ni Hoero!. Her stage name was Tomoe Mari (麻里 とも恵, Mari Tomoe). However, she eventually quit the acting profession, stating, "I detest being a minor player who is made to appear nude—especially when I am not even the lead actress".

=== Music career ===
After receiving recognition for performing at a film wrap party, Agawa started a career as a jazz singer. One of her earliest jobs in jazz music was as a singer for clarinetist Shoji Suzuki, before debuting as a solo singer. Her first album Yasuko: Love-Bird was released by Victor Entertainment in 1978, and she subsequently released dozens of albums with them. Released in 1980, her fourth album Journey achieved sales of 90,000 copies—driven primarily by an audience of office workers. She beat the record hold by Kimiko Kasai at 50,000; around that time, domestic music albums outside of the new music genre rarely sold well, with even kayōkyoku star Kenji Sawada seeing album sales fall short of 50,000 copies. Her album Sunglow was selected as a Best Ten Album at the 23rd Japan Record Awards. She also appeared on the Nippon Television talk show Oshare 30-30 as a regular.

Agawa's music became popular among DJs in the 1990s, particularly those specializing in jazz music. It gained popularity in London, where Dingwalls' Patrick Forge and Gilles Peterson were among those who spun her records. Her song "Skindo-Le-Le", a cover produced by its original performer - Brazilian-American group Viva Brasil - become popular in the DJ scene, becoming "treasured as a definitive 'killer track' by club-jazz DJs" and "an anthem of the London club jazz scene". In 2007, Tatsuo Sunaga released a remixed album of Agawa's music, named Re-mode: Club Jazz Digs Yasuko Agawa.

In addition to her dozens of albums with Victor Entertainment, Agawa released two albums from Nippon Crown in December 2004: Anklet and Tiara. She has made two appearances at the Jazz in Kamakura festival, including in 2012. In September 2014, she performed at a dinner show whose organizers donated 50,000 yen worth of proceeds to the Kids Support Project Committee. She currently hosts a Crossover Night concert series in conjunction with Billboard Live.

=== Themes, legacy, and personal life ===
Writing for Mikiki, Waltzanova said that Agawa's music "incorporated elements of Latin, Brazilian, and AOR styles, refusing to be confined solely within the 'jazz' category". Waltzanova described Agawa's 1982 cover of "New York Afternoon" as "the definitive prototype for the many 'salon jazz vocal' interpretations that would follow." Her music collaborators included Ivan Lins, Sérgio Mendes, Pino Palladino, Joe Sample, Al Schmitt, and Yann Tomita.

Agawa relied on television programming and commercials as a medium for sustaining her widespread popularity during the 1970s and 1980s; writing for Tower Records' Bounce magazine, Shuichi Iketani attributed her popularity to her "glamorous presence and subtly sweet singing style". In 1982, Weekly Asahi reported that she was one of the key figures responsible for sparking the jazz boom of her era. Agawa recalled of her growing demand as a singer: "There were times I would hop between five different jazz clubs in a single night to sing. Since most bands' vocal sets consisted of only about three songs, people used to tease me, saying, 'If you've got a repertoire of three songs, you can make a living just fine!'"

Retrospectively, Toru Hashimoto called her "Japan's most famous female jazz singer", and Sadao Watanabe described her as a "leading figure in Japan's jazz and fusion boom". Other nicknames she has been described by include the "Sugar Voice" (シュガー・ボイス), the "Idol of the Salaryman Set" (ネクタイ族のアイドル) and the "Idol of the Gentlemen's Crowd" (オジサマ族のアイドル).

Agawa was among several artists re-evaluated as part of the city pop genre in the 2010s. In 2019, Victor Entertainment released Free Soul: Yasuko Agawa as part of its Free Soul series. Her song "L.A. Night" appeared on the 2019 city pop compilation Pacific Breeze: Japanese City Pop, AOR and Boogie 1976–1986. She was one of several artists featured in the Light Mellow Deluxe compilation series released in December 2025.

Agawa is a fan of baseball player Yutaka Enatsu, as well as the Yomiuri Giants baseball team; reportedly, magazine articles centered around her would resemble game reports. She is also a fan of the Karatsu Kunchi festival in Karatsu, Saga. In 2010, she attended the Bungakuza Theatre Institute's 50th anniversary, where she reunited with other Bungakuza alumni.

== Discography ==
Title	Details
Yasuko: Love-Bird (stylized as Yasuko "Love-Bird")	Released: 25 January 1978; Label: Victor Entertainment
Flyin' Over	Released: 25 August 1978; Label: Victor Entertainment
Sweet Menu (stylized in all-caps)	Released: 5 February 1980; Label: Victor Entertainment
Journey (stylized in all-caps)	Released: 21 November 1980; Label: Victor Entertainment
Sunglow (stylized in all-caps)	Released: 21 June 1981; Label: Victor Entertainment
Soft Wings (stylized in all-caps)	Released: 5 February 1982; Label: Victor Entertainment
Fine!	Released: 21 September 1982; Label: Victor Entertainment
Night Line	Released: 21 September 1983; Label: Victor Entertainment
Gravy	Released: 21 June 1984; Label: Victor Entertainment
All Right With Me (stylized in all-caps)	Released: 21 January 1985; Label: Victor Entertainment
Lady September	Released: 21 August 1985; Label: Victor Entertainment
Melodies (stylized in all-caps)	Released: 5 August 1986; Label: Victor Entertainment
Ms. Mystery (stylized in all-caps)	Released: 1 May 1987; Label: Victor Entertainment
Ouro do Manaus (stylized as OURO do MANAUS)	Released: 9 March 1988; Label: Victor Entertainment
When the World Turns Blue (stylized in all-caps)	Released: 21 February 1989; Label: Victor Entertainment
Oshare 30-30 (オシャレ30・30)	Released: 21 August 1989; Label: Victor Entertainment
Dancing Lover's Nite: Miss A (stylized as 「DANCING LOVER'S NITE」MISS A)	Released: 21 November 1989; Label: Victor Entertainment
Your Songs (stylized in all-caps)	Released: 21 June 1990; Label: Victor Entertainment
Come in Christmas (stylized in all-caps)	Released: 7 November 1990; Label: Victor Entertainment
My Duke (stylized in all-caps)	Released: 21 September 1991; Label: Victor Entertainment
Le Cinema	Released: 26 August 1992; Label: Victor Entertainment
In Autumn (stylized in all-caps)	Released: 21 August 1993; Label: Victor Entertainment
Amizade (stylized in all-caps)	Released: 24 August 1994; Label: Victor Entertainment
Beauty And The Beast	Released: 23 November 1994; Label: Victor Entertainment
Close to You (stylized in all-caps)	Released: 21 June 1996; Label: Victor Entertainment
Echoes	Released: 18 December 1996; Label: Victor Entertainment
Tea for Two	Released: 22 September 1997; Label: Victor Entertainment
L.A. Night (stylized in all-caps)	Released: 1 May 2000; Label: Victor Entertainment
Other World	Released: 17 March 2001; Label: Victor Entertainment
We've Got Mail (stylized in low-caps)	Released: 17 December 2003; Label: Victor Entertainment
Anklet	Released: 15 December 2004; Label: Nippon Crown
Tiara	Released: 15 December 2004; Label: Nippon Crown
Re-Mode Club Jazz Digs: Yasuko Agawa (stylized as re-mode club jazz digs YASUKO AGAWA)	Released: 23 May 2007; Label: Victor Entertainment
Tatsuo Sunaga Digs: Best of Yasuko Agawa (stylized as TATSUO SUNAGA digs BEST of YASUKO AGAWA)	Released: 23 May 2007; Label: Victor Entertainment
Meu Romance	Released: 16 July 2008; Label: Victor Entertainment
Yasuko Agawa: Miss-A-Mixture (stylized in all-caps)	Released: 16 July 2008; Label: Victor Entertainment
Yasuko Agawa: Smooth Latin Best (stylized as Yasuko Agawa Smooth Latin Best)	Released: 16 September 2009; Label: Victor Entertainment
Agawa Yasuko: Selection Standard Best (阿川泰子セレクション・スタンダード・ベスト)	Released: 19 May 2010; Label: Victor Entertainment
Crossover Night: Unchained Melody (クロスオーヴァー・ナイト～アンチェインド・メロディ～)	Released: 19 November 2014; Label: Victor Entertainment
Golden Best Agawa Yasuko: Contemporary Selection (ゴールデン☆ベスト 阿川泰子-Contemporary Selection)	Released: 27 May 2015; Label: Victor Entertainment
Adlib Presents: Victor Wa-Fusion Premium Best 10th Avenue +2 (ADLIB presents ビクター和フュージョン・プレミアム・ベスト 10th AVENUE +2)	Released: 25 July 2018; Label: Victor Entertainment
Adlib Presents: Victor Wa-Fusion Premium Best Best Jazz Ballad (ADLIB presents ビクター和フュージョン・プレミアム・ベスト Best JAZZ BALLAD)	Released: 25 July 2018; Label: Victor Entertainment
Free Soul: Yasuko Agawa (stylized as Free Soul Yasuko Agawa)	Released: 6 March 2019; Label: Victor Entertainment
Light Mellow Deluxe: Agawa Yasuko (Light Mellow Deluxe 阿川泰子)	Released: 24 December 2025; Label: Victor Entertainment

== Filmography ==
- Karei-naru Ichizoku (1974)
- Evil of Dracula (1974), Keiko Nonomiya
- Prophecies of Nostradamus (1974), Kida's daughter
- Seishun no Mon (1975)
- Terror of Mechagodzilla (1975), Yuri Yamamoto
- Taiyō ni Hoero!
