= Lamp (band) =

Japanese indie band

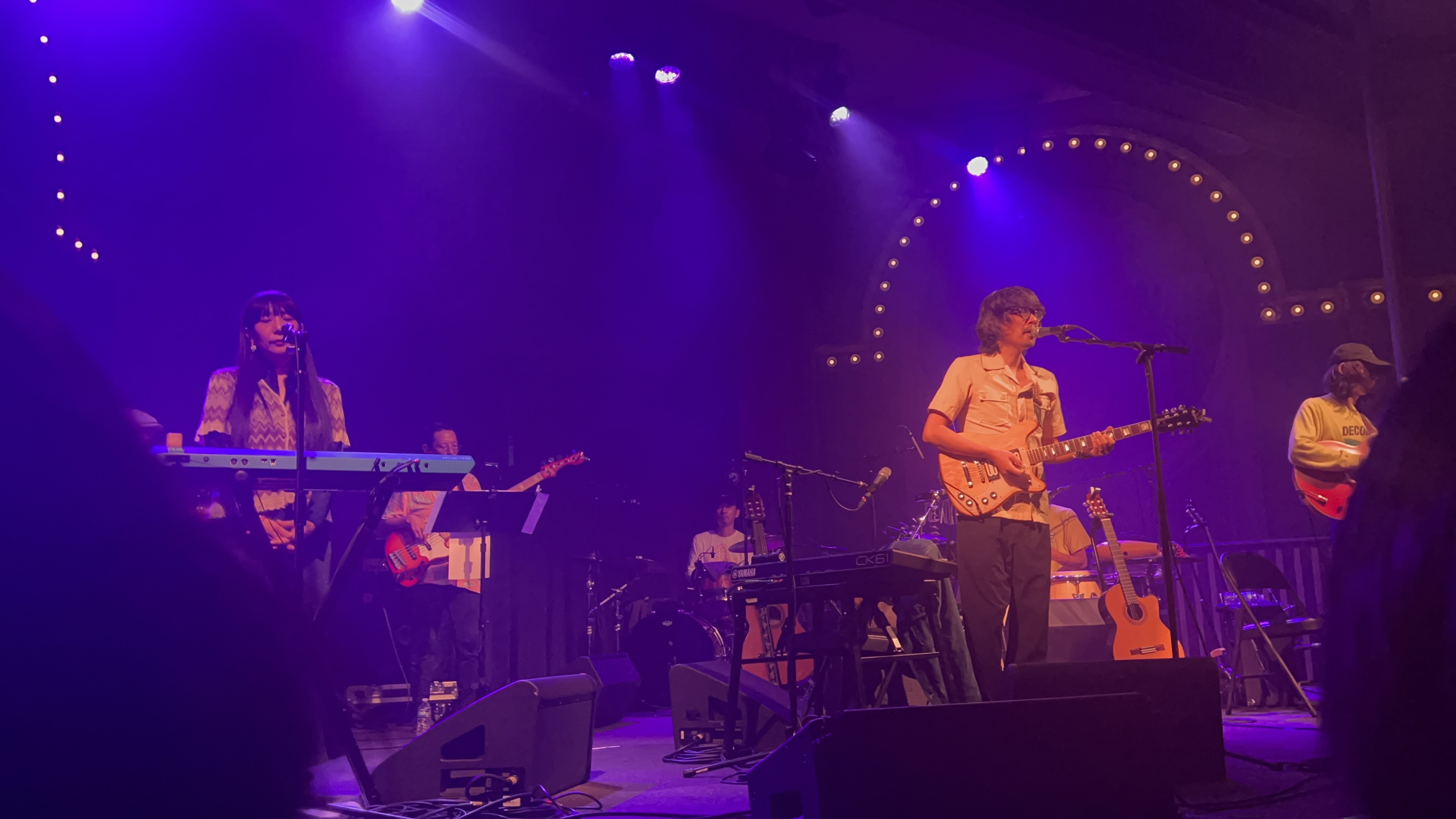
- Lamp playing at the McMenamins Crystal Ballroom in Portland, OR in 2024 (from left to right: Kaori Sakakibara, Yusuke Nagai, and Taiyō Someya)

Background information
- Origin: Tokyo, Japan
- Genres: Shibuya-kei; jazz pop; city pop; bossa nova; indie pop; dream pop
- Years active: 2000–present
- Labels: Botanical House; Polystar; Motel Bleu
- Members: Taiyo Someya (染谷太陽); Yusuke Nagai (永井祐介); Kaori Sakakibara (榊原香保里)
- Website: lampweb.jp

Lamp (Japanese: ランプ) are a Japanese indie pop band formed in 2000, composing of guitarist Taiyo Someya, and vocalists and multi instrumentalists Yusuke Nagai and Kaori Sakakibara.

A shared interest in 1960s American and British music inspired the trio to co-write songs together. After writing enough songs for a demo tape, they played their first show in 2001 in a small bar in Japan. In 2002 they signed a record deal in 2002 with now-defunct label Motel Bleu, and released their debut album Soyokaze Apartment Room 201 a year later.

Despite Lamp recording and releasing multiple albums throughout the decade, their popularity in their early years was restricted to Asia only, with the band exclusively performing music in Japan, China, South Korea, and Taiwan. In 2021, however, their song "Yume Utsutsu" ("Half Asleep") was used in multiple TikTok videos which went viral. Subsequently, their music received widespread popularity in the West.

== History ==
=== Formation ===
As a child, Someya was introduced to a wide variety of music, as his father Aoshi Someya was a music producer who was a part of the Japanese rock band Murahachibu. While attending high school, Someya was a part of a folk music club, and was introduced to Nagai who was also a part the club. Initially Someya did not think much of him, until he witnessed him performing a solo version of The Beatles song "Hey Jude." Someya later became friends with Nagai, and formed a short-lived band together.

While in university, Someya and Nagai would often use a Multitrack recorder to create cover songs. Someya would often visit local HMV stores around Shinjuku, Shibuya and Kanda-Jinbōchō and listen to French pop and Bossa nova records. During Someya's second year of university, he visited a friend from high school and asked him if he knew anyone who liked the same music and could sing. Someya's friend later introduced him to Sakakibara, where they both became friends. Someya introduced Nagai to Sakakibara, and later decided to form a band together.

In February 2000, they began to co-write songs. After writing enough songs for a demo tape, they played their first show in 2001 in a small bar in Japan.

In 2002, they signed a record deal with Motel Bleu, a currently defunct record label.

=== 2003–2011: Early years and first six albums ===
On 9 April 2003, Lamp released their debut album, Soyokaze Apartment Room 201 (そよ風アパートメント201). Someya has cited manga artist Yoshiharu Tsuge as influence for the first album's lyrics.

On 11 February 2004, they released their second album, For Lovers (恋人へ). Despite selling less than their first album, For Lovers became a fan favorite over the years.

On 25 May 2005, they released their third album, At Komorebi St. (木洩陽通りにて).

On 7 March 2007, they released their compilation album, Afterglow (残光).

On 3 December 2008, they released their fourth album, Lamp Phantasma (ランプ幻想).

On 4 August 2010, they released their fifth album, The Poetry Of August (八月の詩情).

On 9 February 2011, they released their sixth album, Tōkyō Utopia Communications (東京ユウトピア通信). The album cover was drawn by manga artist Ouji Suzuki.

=== 2014–2019: Botanical House, Tours, Yume, Her Watch. ===
On 5 February 2014, Lamp released their seventh album, Yume (ゆめ). The album cover was drawn by illustrator Sēichi Hayashi (林静一). In 2014, they started their own label Botanical House. They performed at Beatram Music Festival in Toyama Castle Park. They collaborated with San Francisco-based band The Bilinda Butchers on their debut album, Heaven.

On 13 March 2015, they released their compilation album, Ame ni Hana (雨に花).

In December 2015, they performed at Hello Indie in Sendai.

In 2017, they toured in China, including Shenzhen, Beijing, and Shanghai. On 20 April, they performed in Taipei.

On 15 May 2018, they released their eighth album, Her Watch (彼女の時計). The album cover was drawn by the artist oyasmur.

In July 2018, they released the single, "Tabibito/Place in my dream (旅人／夢の国)". In August 2018, they released the split single, "Blue/Girlfriend (ブルー／Girlfriend)," a collaboration with The Bilinda Butchers. In August and September, Lamp held the Lamp Asia Tour 2018 "A Distant Shore", performing in cities such as Beijing, Tokyo, Fukuoka, Seoul, Hong Kong, and Taipei. In October, they performed at Kirari Music Festival in Fujimi.

=== 2019–present: Stardust In Blue, Dusk to Dawn, widespread mainstream popularity, and North American tour ===
On 8 September 2020, they released Stardust In Blue with vocalist Kaede and features vocals from UWANOSORA. They have background vocals on all tracks except for Jupiter, which only has Kaede and UWANOSORA.

In 2021, a TikTok video containing the band's song Yume Utsutsu (ゆめうつつ), which translates to "Half Asleep", went viral on the platform. This caught the attention of Someya who was intending to venture out with the band to North America to introduce their music to western audiences.

On 10 October 2023, they released their ninth album, Dusk to Dawn (一夜のペーソス). In an interview with Tokion, it is stated that the album has been in development since 2019. In the process of creating the album, Taiyo Someya ended up writing many more songs than expected, hence the 20 songs on the track list. Due to his large songwriting contribution, this was the first album where Someya credited himself as the producer.

In August 2024, the band embarked on their debut North American tour, "FUTURE BEHIND ME", as well as supporting acts for the singer Mitski.

== Style and influences ==
Lamp's style has been described as Shibuya-kei, city pop, and café music, but they have also been described as difficult to place into one genre. The band often incorporates elements of bossa nova, jazz, soul, and funk into their music. They have cited Brazilian music, The Beatles, The Beach Boys, and Simon & Garfunkel as influences.

== Members ==
- Taiyō Someya (染谷大陽) – guitar, keyboards
- Yusuke Nagai (永井祐介) – vocals, guitar, bass, keyboards
- Kaori Sakakibara (榊原香保里) – vocals, flute, accordion, keyboards

== Discography ==
=== Studio albums ===
- Soyokaze Apartment Room 201, そよ風アパートメント201 (2002)
- For Lovers, 恋人へ (2004)
- At Komorebi St., 木洩陽通りにて (2005)
- Lamp Phantasma, ランプ幻想 (2008)
- The Poetry Of August, 八月の詩情 (2010)
- Tōkyō Utopia Communications, 東京ユウトピア通信 (2011)
- Yume, ゆめ (2014)
- Her Watch, 彼女の時計 (2018)
- Stardust In Blue, 秋の惑星、ハートはナイトブルー。(2020)
- Dusk to Dawn, 一夜のペーソス (2023)

=== Live album ===
- "A Distant Shore" Asia Tour 2018 (2019)
- “A Distant Shore” Live in Tokyo Kinema Club (2018)

=== Compilations ===
- The Rain and The Flower, 雨に花 (2005)
- The Rain and The Flower, 雨に花 (2015, 2017)
- The shine that never returns, デモ音源集 戻らない輝きは (2018)

=== Singles ===
- "Tabibito/Place in my dream, 旅人／夢の国" (2018)
- Blue/Girlfriend, ブルー／Girlfriend" (2018)

=== Other charted songs ===
List of songs, with selected chart positions, showing year released and album name
Title	Year	Peaks	Album
Title	Year	US Ja.	Album
"ゆめうつつLamp"	2008	15 (Note: "ゆめうつつLamp" did not chart on the US Japan Songs chart until 2023.)	Lamp Phantasma
"二十歳の恋"	2008	18 (Note: "二十歳の恋" did not chart on the US Japan Songs chart until 2024.)	Lamp Phantasma

=== Other works ===
- Margaret, マーガレット (2006)
- Rain, long‐continued rain, 雨、降り続く雨 (2014)
- One night, 或る夜 (2014)
- Fantasy/Train window, Fantasy／車窓 (2018)
- Memories of Soda Pop, ソーダ水の想い出 (2018)
- Aru Yoru, 或る夜 (2020)

== Bibliography ==
- SONG BOOK 2003-2007 (2016)
- SONG BOOK Vol.2 2008-2011 (2020)
- Lamp "Akari Tsushin" Winter 2021 Issue #1 (2021)
- Lamp "Akari Tsushin" Spring 2021 Issue #2 (2021)
- Lamp "Akari Tsushin" Summer 2021 Issue #3 (2021)
