= Kankyō Ongaku =

2019 compilation album

Kankyō Ongaku: Japanese Ambient, Environmental & New Age Music 1980-1990

Compilation album by Various artists
- Released: February 15, 2019
- Genre: Ambient
- Label: Light in the Attic
- Compilers: Spencer Doran; Yosuke Kitazawa; Douglas Mcgowan; Matt Sullivan

Kankyō Ongaku: Japanese Ambient, Environmental & New Age Music 1980-1990 (Japanese: 環境音楽, transl. Environmental Music) is a 2019 compilation of ambient music produced in Japan between 1980 and 1990, compiled by Spencer Doran. It was released on February 15, 2019 through Light in the Attic Records. Upon release, Kankyō Ongaku received universal acclaim. It was nominated for the Grammy Award for Best Historical Album at the 62nd Annual Grammy Awards and Best Re-Issue at the 2020 Libera Awards.

== Background and release ==
"Kankyō Ongaku", a Japanese term for ambient environmental music composed for specific environments, was coined in the 1960s. Following the popularity of Erik Satie's furniture music, and the ambient music of John Cage and Brian Eno in the 1970s in Japan, the genre grew in popularity. Doran cited the use of natural sounds in traditional Japanese music and meditation as an affinity with Satie's music. Much of the album's music was recorded during the Japanese asset price bubble and sponsored by various corporations. Spencer Doran, half of electronic music duo Visible Cloaks, published Fairlights, Mallets and Bamboo (Japan, 1980-86), an ambient compilation mix in 2010. Doran released Music Interiors, a mix which he described as an early version of the album, in 2011. Doran stated that he aimed to the impact of environmental music on Japanese popular culture and the socio-economic impact of the economic bubble in music.

Kankyō Ongaku was published as part of Light in the Attic Records' Japan Archival series. It released compilation albums Even A Tree Can Shed Tears: Japanese Folk & Rock 1969-1973 in 2017 and Pacific Breeze: Japanese City Pop, AOR and Boogie 1976–1986 in 2019. It was also the label's third ambient music multi-disk box set in the previous 10 years. The album was announced in November 2018, with the label noting that it would be the first time the recordings on the album would be available outside of Japan. The album was released as a 3LP vinyl box set and a 2CD book package.

=== Artwork ===
The box set features images in the outer slipcase and inner sleeves by photographer Osamu Murai of the Iwasaki Art Museum, designed by architect Fumihiko Maki.

== Music ==
The album is a compilation of "environmental music", music composed for specific environments. The music selected draws inspiration from Japanese traditions such as toki no kane (transl. temple bells), Erik Satie's furniture music, and Brian Eno's ambient music. Many songs incorporate sounds from nature, such as running water, and traditional Japanese instruments.

Satoshi Ashikawa's "Still Space" was composed for Art Vivant, a record and book store. Yoshio Ojima's "Glass Chattering" was selected from a collection of works played inside The Spiral, a building in Tokyo. Hideki Matsutake’s "Nemureru Yoru" was selected from a sleep aid cassette. It has a white noise instrumental, evoking a passing subway train, and a voice counting sheep. Joe Hisaishi's "Islander" begins with a synthesizer riff and incorporates "Philip Glass-esque organs." Yoshiaki Ochi's "Ear Dreamin" incorporates marimbas and synthesized choir vocals. Masashi Kitamura & Phonogenix's "Variation III" mixes wave sounds with ambient synths and occasional chū-daiko percussion. Interior's "Park" utilizes dry sticks to create a sound similar to a record scratch. Yoshio Suzuki's "Meet Me In The Sheep Meadow" was produced using a Oberheim OB-8. Toshi Tsuchitori's "Ishiura" incorporates volcanic sanukaito stones to produce bell-like tones.

Yasuaki Shimizu's "Seiko 3" was composed for a Seiko watch commercial. Inoyama Land's "Apple Star" contains a delay effect run through a water tank. Hiroshi Yoshimura's "Blink" was composed for the Hara Museum of Contemporary Art and contains a piano instrumental. Akira Ito's "Praying for Mother / Earth Part 1" mixes the sound of a brook with synth chords and bird sounds. Jun Fukamachi's "Breathing New Life" was composed for a fashion show. It mixes elements of traditional percussion with modern electronic instrumentation. Takashi Toyoda's "Snow" transposes biofeedback from brain waves in its composition. Takashi Kokubo's "A Dream Sails Out to Sea - Scene 3" was selected from a promotional LP included with Sanyo air conditioning units. It was composed to convey a beach atmosphere. Haruomi Hosono's "Original BGM" was commissioned as background music for department store Muji.

== Critical reception ==
Professional ratings
Aggregate scores
Source	Rating
Metacritic	88/100
Review scores
Source	Rating
AllMusic	4/5 stars
Exclaim!	9/10
Financial Times	4/5 stars
Pitchfork	8.5/10
PopMatters	9/10
Slant	4.5/5 stars
Uncut	4.5/5 stars

According to the review aggregator Metacritic, Kankyō Ongaku: Japanese Ambient, Environmental & New Age Music 1980-1990 received "universal acclaim" based on a weighted average score of 88 out of 100 from 9 critic scores.

Gabriel Szatan's review for Resident Advisor concludes that the album is "the kind of music you could imagine spending the rest of your life listening to." Jake Cole of Slant concludes his review stating: "By showcasing an artistic fusion of the tranquil with the bustling, the primal with the technologically advanced, the compilation shows how much work has already been done to find ways of summarizing and celebrating the potential of this new reality." Mark Richardson's review for Pitchfork described the album as "deeply satisfying, sustaining a consistent mood while offering a number of textures and styles." Writing for The Quietus, Robin Turner stated that the "tracks here promote a warmth that feels somewhere close to paradise." Chris Ingalls of PopMatters described the album as "a warm, poignant, deeply immersive set that is sure to please fans of the genre but quite honestly belongs in every home." AllMusic's Paul Simpson described the album as "fascinating and eye-opening, and far more than just pleasant, unassuming musical wallpaper." Bandcamp Daily ranked the album the 38th best album of 2019, with Joshua Minsoo Kim praising the album's "simplicity and quietude".

=== Awards ===
Awards and nominations for Kankyō Ongaku
Ceremony	Year	Category	Result	Ref.
Grammy Awards	2020	Best Historical Album	Nominated	
Libera Awards	2020	Best Re-Issue	Nominated	

== Track listing ==
Disc 1
No.	Title	Music	Length
1.	"Still Space"	Satoshi Ashikawa	3:59
2.	"Glass Chattering"	Yoshio Ojima	5:56
3.	"Nemureru Yoru (Karaoke Version)"	Hideki Matsutake	6:26
4.	"Islander"	Joe Hisaishi	5:13
5.	"Ear Dreamin"	Yoshiaki Ochi	4:45
6.	"Variation III"	Masashi Kitamura & Phonogenix	3:35
7.	"Park"	Interior	4:06
8.	"Nube"	Yoichiro Yoshikawa	2:15
9.	"Meet Me In The Sheep Meadow"	Yoshio Suzuki	3:26
10.	"Ishiura (Abridged)"	Toshi Tsuchitori	5:13
11.	"Tomoshibi (Abridged)"	Shiho Yabuki	2:37
12.	"Chaconne"	Toshifumi Hinata	4:29

Disc 2
No.	Title	Music	Length
1.	"Seiko 3"	Yasuaki Shimizu	1:19
2.	"Apple Star"	Inoyama Land	6:01
3.	"Blink"	Hiroshi Yoshimura	4:44
4.	"See the Light (Abridged)"	Fumio Miyashita	6:50
5.	"Praying for Mother / Earth Part 1"	Akira Ito	4:13
6.	"Breathing New Life"	Jun Fukamachi	4:57
7.	"Snow"	Takashi Toyoda	5:00
8.	"Loom"	Yellow Magic Orchestra	5:23
9.	"A Dream Sails Out To Sea - Scene 3"	Takashi Kokubo	6:48
10.	"Umi No Sunatsubu"	Masahiro Sugaya	1:12
11.	"Original BGM"	Haruomi Hosono	15:55
