= Naoko Gushima =

Japanese singer-songwriter

- 具島直子
- Occupation: Singer-songwriter

Naoko Gushima (具島直子, Gushima Naoko) is a Japanese singer-songwriter. Her debut album, miss.G, debuted in 1996. Gushima is one of many musicians in Japan who have enjoyed renewed attention due to an explosion in interest in city pop since the 2010s, leading to many of her albums being pressed again in the 2020s, as well as the release of her 2023 EP, Prism.

== Early life and education ==
At the age of four, Gushima began playing the piano. She dropped out of university at the age of 21 to pursue a music career after having met musician and vocal trainer Bobby Kirigaya.

== Career ==
In 1996, Gushima released her debut album, miss.G, under the label Toshiba EMI. With production backing from Kirigaya, she subsequently released Quiet Emotion in 1997, Mellow Medicine in 1999, and Mystic Spice in 2007.

In 2009, Gushima released a best of album called Magic Wave.

In 2019, to commemorate the 40th anniversary of Tower Records in Japan, the franchise reissued limited-edition, remastered CDs for three of Gushima's albums, along with albums by other artists. In 2021, Tower Records re-released colored vinyls of miss.G and Quiet Emotion, followed by a vinyl re-release of Mystic Spice in 2023.

In 2023, Gushima released Prism, her first EP, and release of any kind, since Mystic Spice in 2007. It includes a remix of "Candy," from miss.G, from the Japanese producer Yaffle.

== Discography ==
=== Studio albums ===
- miss.G (1996)
- Quiet Emotion (1997)
- Mellow Medicine (1999)
- Mystic Spice (2007)

=== Extended Plays ===
- Prism (2023)

=== Compilation albums ===
- Magic Wave (2009)
