= Hitomi Tohyama =

Japanese singer (born 1957)

Hitomi Tohyama 当山ひとみ
- Also known as: Hitomi "Penny" Tohyama
- Born: 28 December 1957 (age 68); Koza, Okinawa
- Genres: City pop; funk
- Label: Nippon Columbia
- Website: https://ameblo.jp/shineon-penny/

Hitomi Tohyama (当山 ひとみ, Tōyama Hitomi; born 28 December 1957), also known as Hitomi "Penny" Tohyama, is a Japanese singer from Okinawa City. Raised in California, where she attended Oakland High School, she released several albums and singers with Nippon Columbia in the 1980s. Her music regained popularity as part of the 21st-century city pop wave.

== Early life and education ==
Hitomi Tohyama, a native of Koza, Okinawa, was born on 28 December 1957, daughter of a United States Armed Forces officer of Chinese, Filipino, and Spanish descent. Originally raised in Okinawa when it was still part of the United States Civil Administration of the Ryukyu Islands, she and her parents moved to California while she was in junior high school, and she enrolled at Oakland High School; her song "SFO-Oakland" was inspired by her experiences from that time.

During her youth, Tohyama was interested in Motown music and Philadelphia soul. Tohyama's older sister Myrah Kay, also a musician, inspired her to take up a career in singing after she performed the song "Sunny" at her sister's club. She obtained the nickname Penny from her "petite frame".

== Music career ==
What I found fascinating was that she sang several songs in English. She was incredibly skilled, just like an American singer. She sang in a soul style, with a rich, powerful voice that contrasted with her petite frame. (Note: 私が面白いと思ったのは、彼女が何曲かを英語で歌っていたことだ。それは実に上手で、アメリカ人が歌うのとまったく変わらなかった。彼女はソウルのスタイルで歌った。その小柄な体つきとは対照的に、豊かで力のみなぎった声で。)

— Bryan Farrell on Tohyama.

Tohyama's music career began after she became a choral singer for Rie Ida's band Auction, later joining the chorus trio Joy. Prior to her solo debut, her first record release was with Katsuya Kobayashi's disco project Ecstacy E.Z., performing alongside Auction member Yoshihiro Yonekura who would later be one of her songwriters.

Raised primarily in an English-speaking environment, (Note: Tohyama was raised by her father and older sister in the United States, in contrast to her mother being a speaker of the Okinawan language.) Tohyama did not learn Japanese until she began performing professionally in Japan, where her producer Hikaru Kanematsu asked her to do so. Despite her initial frustration with being required to sing in Japanese, she later learned the language, and by 1988, she sung in Japanese "more than half the time".

In 1981, Tohyama made her debut with Nippon Columbia, releasing her album Just Call Me Penny and her single "So Many Times (Doa-Goshi no Good Song)" that year. She later released several more original albums: Next Door, Sexy Robot (both 1983), and Watch Out (1988). She also worked with Mike Baird, Eric Gale, Randy Jackson, and Richard Tee for a 1988 overseas recording session in Los Angeles, where she recorded her album Imagination that year. Her 1986 song "Ikisaki wa Oshienai" was the theme song for the TV Asahi variety show Beichō/Meiko no Omoshiro Nippon. She also performed the ending song for the 1987 animated film Wicked City, "7 Course no Prologue", as well as an insert song.

Ed Cunningham of Tokyo Weekender says that synth-funk was "a relatively common feature" of Tohyama's music. Bryan Harrell of Asahigraph said that Tohyama's singing has a "nostalgic 1970s soul feel" and "captivates and draws listeners into a world of love." Yu Onoda of Mikiki by Tower Records called her "a veteran of the disco scene". Theron Martin of Anime News Network described her Wicked City songs as an "unrema[r]kable adult contemporary style typical of late '80s/early '90s anime OVAs and movies". Tohyama herself cited Motown as an inspiration for her music.

Tohyama was also a radio personality, appearing in ABC Radio's Midnight Best Sound and FM Yokohama's Marine Fantasia.

== Later life ==
Tohyama's music regained popularity with the 21st century resurgence of city pop. Her song "Tuxedo Connection" appeared on WYMS' Sound Travels show on city pop in February 2019. Her song "Exotic Yokogao" appeared in the 2019 compilation album Pacific Breeze: Japanese City Pop, AOR and Boogie 1976–1986. Onoda said that "pursu[ing] a singing style that combined melody and groove rather than relying on vocal ability" may have contributed to her rise in the city pop wave.

In January 2024, Night Tempo released remixes of her songs "Cathy" and "Exotic Profile" as part of his Showa Groove series. On 6 March 2024, Nippon Columbia released Tohyama's greatest hits album Pretty Penny Hitomi Tohyama: The Best and Rare, featuring remixes from Dimitri from Paris and Muro in addition to previous existing hits.

== Discography ==
=== Albums ===
Title	Details
Just Call Me Penny	Released: May 1981; Label: Nippon Columbia
Heart Full Of L.A. Mind	Released: February 1982; Label: Nippon Columbia
On The Radio	Released: August 1982; Label: Nippon Columbia
Next Door	Released: February 1983; Label: Nippon Columbia
Sexy Robot	Released: October 1983; Label: Nippon Columbia
Five Penny's	Released: March 1985; Label: Nippon Columbia
Human Voice	Released: October 1985; Label: Nippon Columbia
Lady Ballad	Released: March 1986; Label: Nippon Columbia
Hello Me	Released: July 1986; Label: Nippon Columbia
One Scene	Released: 21 April 1987; Label: Nippon Columbia
Imagination	Released: March 1988; Label: Nippon Columbia
Watch Out!	Released: 1988; Label: Nippon Columbia
After 5:00 Story	Released: 1989; Label: Nippon Columbia
Munasawagi	Released: 21 August 1992; Label: Nippon Columbia

=== Singles ===
Title	Details
"Doa-goshi no Good Song (So Many Times) / SFO-Oakland"	Released: May 1981; Label: Nippon Columbia
"Symphony / Midnight Express"	Released: October 1981; Label: Nippon Columbia
"I Don't Think I Can Wait / Office Date"	Released: March 1982; Label: Nippon Columbia
"Our Lovely Days / My Guy"	Released: July 1982; Label: Nippon Columbia
"Good-Bye / Exotic Yokogao"	Released: March 1983; Label: Nippon Columbia
"Try To Say / Sexy Robot"	Released: October 1983; Label: Nippon Columbia
"Kanojo ni wa Wakaranai / Air Pocket"	Released: March 1985; Label: Nippon Columbia
"Behind You / Try To Say"	Released: June 1985; Label: Nippon Columbia
"School Band / You Are The One"	Released: October 1985; Label: Nippon Columbia
"Ginga no Katasumi de / I Belong To You"	Released: February 1986; Label: Nippon Columbia
"Ikisaki wa Oshienai / Hello Me"	Released: June 1986; Label: Nippon Columbia
"7 Course no Prologue"	Released: 1 June 1987; Label: Nippon Columbia
