= Pacific Breeze: Japanese City Pop, AOR and Boogie 1976–1986 =

Compilation album by Various artists
- Released: May 3, 2019
- Genre: City pop
- Label: Light in the Attic
- Producer: Andy Cabic, Zach Cowie, Yosuke Kitazawa, Mark "Frosty" McNeill, Matt Sullivan
- Compiler: Andy Cabic, Zach Cowie, Yosuke Kitazawa, Mark "Frosty" McNeill, Matt Sullivan

Pacific Breeze: Japanese City Pop, AOR and Boogie 1976–1986 is a 2019 compilation album. The album was released by Light in the Attic Records on May 3, 2019, as the third part of their Japan Archival Series, starting with Even a Tree Can Shed Tears: Japanese Folk & Rock 1969–1973.

== Production ==
Pacific Breeze: Japanese City Pop, AOR and Boogie 1976–1986 was part of the American Light in the Attic Records label's reissuing of Japanese music. This release was a follow-up to releases by artists such as Haruomi Hosono, and a Kankyo Ongaku collection of 1980s ambient music. Although the label claimed it to be the first compilation of city pop outside of Japan, BGP and Cultures of Soul had previously released archival compilations of the genre.

The music on the album was compiled and produced by Andy Cabic, Zach Cowie, a DJ and music supervisor, Yosuke Kitazawa, who oversees Light in the Attic's Japanese music series, Mark "Frosty" McNeill, founder of the online radio station Dublab, and Matt Sullivan.

== Style ==
The music on the album has been described as city pop, a slick commercial sound of music from late 1970s and early 1980s Japan. Although the genre is often described as being about Japan embracing an affluent consumerist lifestyle, Mark "Frosty" McNeill stated that the style is "more of a vibe classification than a collective movement." Forty years later, the genre had seen what James Hadfield of Rolling Stone described as "something of a resurgence as pop music adjusts to a new technological paradigm dominated by streaming." Kitazawa stated that there were "no restrictions on style or a specific genre that we wanted to convey with these songs, this was music made by city people, for city people."

== Release ==
Pacific Breeze: Japanese City Pop, AOR and Boogie 1976–1986 was released by Light in the Attic Records on May 3, 2019. The album was released on compact disc and vinyl with special editions that included a beach towel and a poster. The cover art of the album was by Hiroshi Nagai, whose artwork was featured on several city pop album covers of the 1980s.

== Critical reception ==
Professional ratings
Review scores
Source	Rating
AllMusic	3.5/5 stars
Pitchfork	8.0/10
PopMatters	8/10 stars

Hadfield of The Japan Times stated that Studio Mule's Midnight in Tokyo series would be a better place to seek more hidden gems of the genre, but that "Pacific Breeze has its share of curios." The review noted that Mariya Takeuchi's "Plastic Love" was "mercifully absent" as well as other more "principal architects of the city pop sound, including Eiichi Ohtaki and Tatsuro Yamashita, and it undermines the compilation’s claim to provide a definitive overview in the manner of Kankyo Ongaku." The review concluded that the album would be "best approached as an expertly sequenced mixtape rather than an exercise in musicology, and its arrival just before summer feels perfectly timed." Chris Ingalls of PopMatters found that the album "covers a wide range of styles to the extent that there's virtually something here for every taste. It's impeccably executed and lovingly curated and the perfect soundtrack for a sunny day off with the ocean breeze in your hair."

== Track listing ==
Track listing adapted from liner notes.

1. Tomoko Soryo – "I Say Who"
2. Taeko Ohnuki – "Kusuri Wo Takusan"
3. Minako Yoshida – "Midnight Driver"
4. Nanako Sato – "Subterranean Futari Bocci"
5. Haruomi Hosono – "Sports Men"
6. Izumi Kobayashi – "Coffee Rumba"
7. F.O.E. – "In My Jungle"
8. Akira Inoue, Hiroshi Sato, Masataka Matsutoya – "Sun Bathing"
9. Hiroshi Satoh – "Say Goodbye"
10. Yukihiro Takahashi – "Drip Dry Eyes"
11. Masayoshi Takanaka – "Bamboo Vendor"
12. Shigeru Suzuki – "Lady Pink Panther"
13. Haruomi Hosono, Takahiko Ishikawa, Masataka Matsutoya – "Bride of Mykonos"
14. Yasuko Agawa – "L.A. Night"
15. Hitomi Tohyama – "Exotic Yokogao"
16. Tazumi Toyoshima – "Machibouke"

== Credits ==
Credits adapted from liner notes.

- Andy Cabic – compiler, producer
- Zach Cowie – compiler, producer
- Yosuke Kitazawa – compiler, producer, licensing, bios
- Mark "Frosty" McNeill – compiler, producer, liner notes
- Matt Sullivan – compiler, producer, executive producer
- Josh Wright – executive producer
- Patrick McCarthy – project manager
- Lydia Hystop – proofreading
- Dave Cooley – remastering
- Elysian Masters – remastering
- Hiroshi Nagai – cover art
- D.Norsen Design – design and layout
