= Hue House =

Asian cultural hub in Midtown

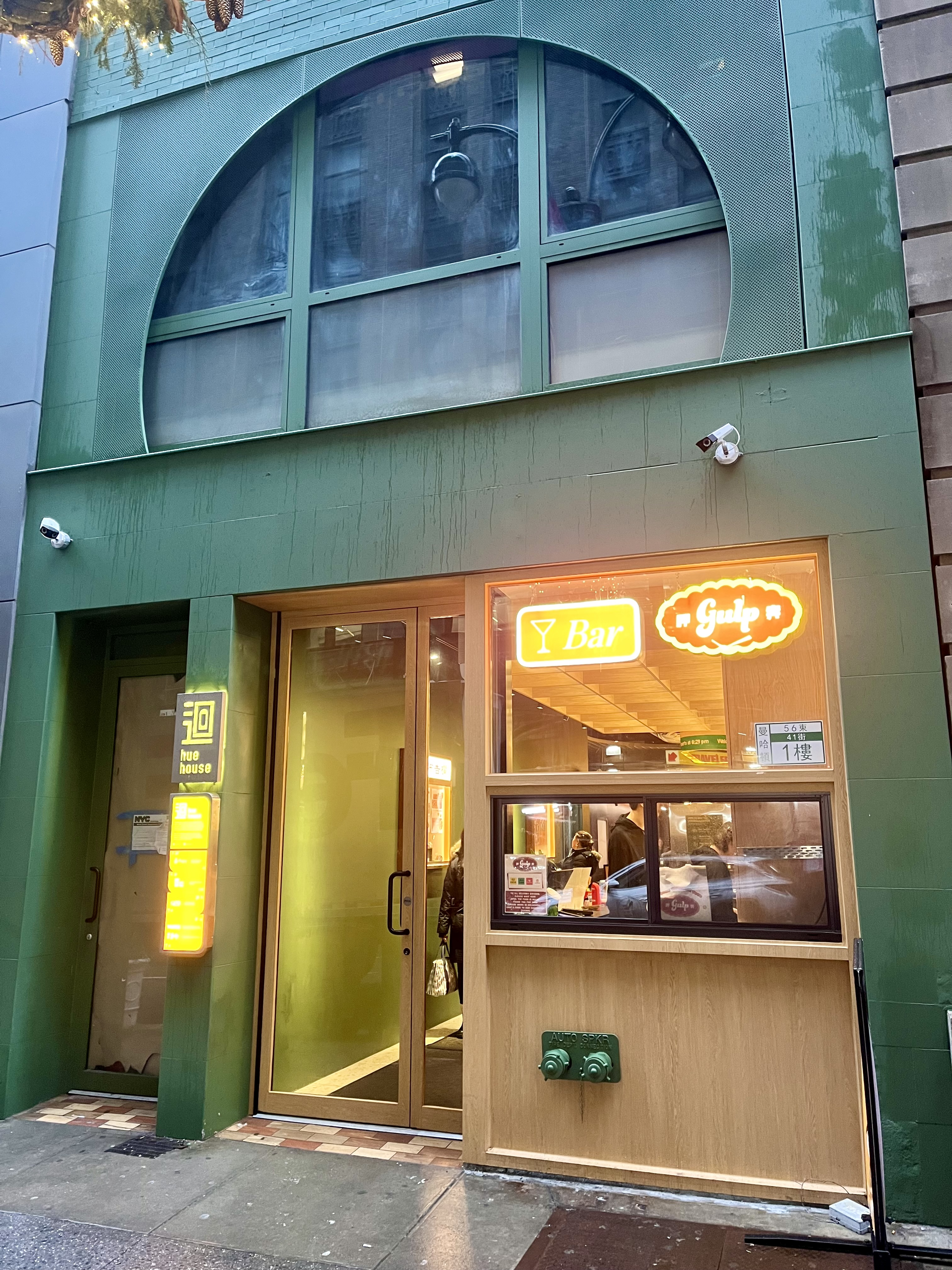
- The building in 2025
- Interactive map of the Hue House area

General information
- Location: 56 E 41st Street, Manhattan, New York, United States
- Coordinates: 40.7517°N 73.9789°W

Hue House is a four-story complex in Midtown Manhattan housing several Asian establishments. Founded in order to provide a central hub for Asian culture and community, its name is derived from "迴," a Chinese character "symbolizing flow, return, and homecoming."

== History ==
In November 2025, Hue House opened in Midtown as a collaborative effort between 929 and Gulp. With it came a third location for Gulp, a new location for 929, and a new restaurant called Traveler, with other businesses forthcoming.

== Establishments ==
=== Floor One ===
- Gulp, a Taiwanese restaurant
- Traveler, a seasonally rotating Asian restaurant

=== Floor Two ===
- 929, a Cantopop and Mandopop–themed bar

==== Floor Three ====
- Apt.Hue, a forthcoming coffee and tea shop and retail space

==== Floor Four ====
- Puyu, a Chinese spa
