= Iwasaki Art Museum =

- 岩崎美術館
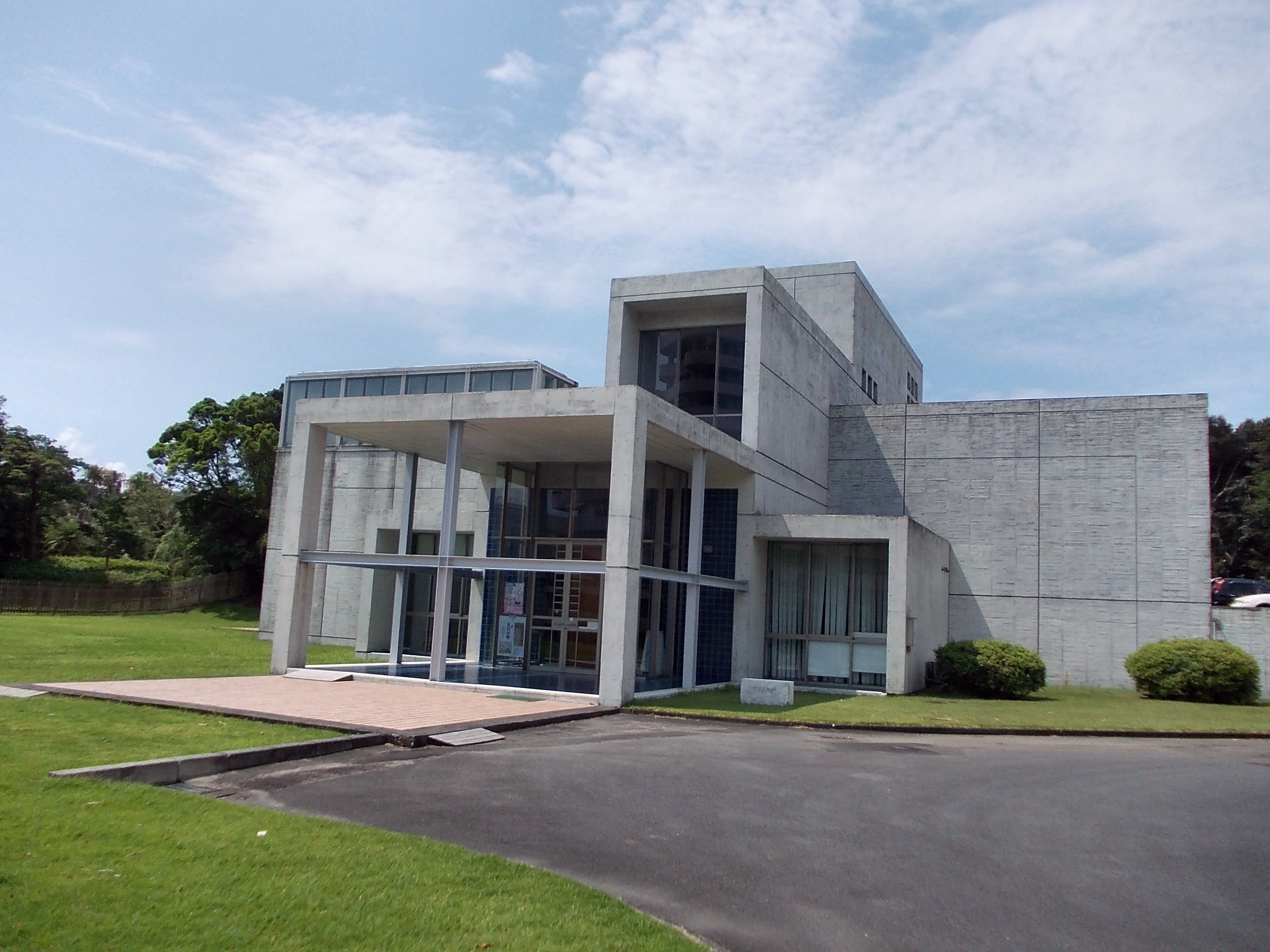
- Interactive map of the Iwasaki Art Museum area

General information
- Location: 3755 Jūni-chō, Ibusuki, Kagoshima Prefecture, Japan
- Coordinates: 31°13′19″N 130°39′16″E
- Opened: 28 April 1983

Design and construction
- Architect: Fumihiko Maki

Website
- Official website

Iwasaki Art Museum (岩崎美術館, Iwasaki bijutsukan) opened in Ibusuki, Kagoshima Prefecture, Japan, in 1983. Located in the gardens of a resort hotel and designed by Fumihiko Maki, the museum's collection includes works by Kuroda Seiki and Fujishima Takeji, as well as Western painters. The adjacent Iwasaki Yoshie Craft Gallery (岩崎芳江工芸館) was established by the bequest of Iwasaki Yoshie, wife of the museum's founder businessman Iwasaki Yohachirō (岩崎與八郎), and opened in 1998. It houses objects including Satsuma ware and folk art from Papua New Guinea.

Pictures of Iwasaki Art Museum were used as the album art for the ambient music collection Kankyō Ongaku: Japanese Ambient, Environmental & New Age Music 1980-1990

== See also ==
- Reimeikan
- Kagoshima City Museum of Art
- List of Cultural Properties of Japan - paintings (Kagoshima)
