= Tazumi Toyoshima =

Japanese singer (born 1954)

Tazumi Toyoshima 豊島 たづみ
- Born: 26 November 1954 (age 71)
- Origin: Fukuoka Prefecture, Japan
- Genres: R&B; City pop
- Occupation: Singer
- Instrument: Vocals
- Label: Polydor Records

Tazumi Toyoshima (Japanese: 豊島 たづみ, Hepburn: Toyoshima Tazumi; born 26 November 1954) is a Japanese singer. She released five albums with Polydor Records in the 1970s and 1980s, and her 1979 single "Tomadoi Twilight" peaked at #19 on the Oricon Singles Chart. Her music enjoyed renewed popularity due to the city pop wave of the 2010s and 2020s, including a 2015 album as part of the Light Mellow series.

== Biography ==
Tazumi Toyoshima, a native of Fukuoka Prefecture, was born on 26 November 1954. She was a fan of American-British singer Scott Walker when she was a girl. While attending university as a Chinese literature major, she appeared in several television commercials.

Toyoshima's debut album Chigire Gumo was released by Polydor Records in 1977. She subsequently released four more albums: Tomadoi Twilight (1979), Still Night (1979), Shukujo no Tashinami (1980), and Lonely One (1981). She performed "Tomadoi Twilight", the theme song of the TBS drama Tatoeba, Ai, and after it was released as a single peaked at #19 on the Oricon Singles Chart. Her experiences with live performances included the Tokyo Music Festival. She also worked as a radio personality, hosting TAZZ no Mellow Night on FM Fukuoka and Young Plaza 3:00 AM on TBS Radio.

In October 1982, after giving birth to a child, Toyoshima retired from singing to devote herself to life as a full-time housewife. She made a comeback to music as a "kitchen singer" in 2007, and she released a new album produced by Jirō Yoshida in 2009, named Kitchen kara Ai wo Komete. In 2018, she released Saikai: Don'na Ashita mo Dakishimetai, where she "portrays the lives of couples who have spent many years together, while also singing of a profound philosophy of life". Writing for UtaTen, Toshikazu Kanazawa called the album an "ambitious return to her roots: Japanese AOR" and "Saikai" a "killer tune that strikes right to the heart of mature women".

Amidst the city pop wave of the 2010s and 2020s, Toyoshima returned to popularity. She received her own album within Kanazawa's Light Mellow series in 2015. Her song "Machibouke" appeared on the 2019 city pop compilation Pacific Breeze: Japanese City Pop, AOR and Boogie 1976–1986; Chris Ingalls of PopMatters said that the song possessed "slinky sophistication". Her song "Tomadoi Twilight" was sampled in Jeezy's 2014 song "Seen It All"; Cardo, who produced the Jeezy song, remarked Toyoshima's song "just made [him] picture the Japan night life and the culture, with the neon lights and the people".

Toyoshima has a son and two daughters with her Dutch husband, and they live in Kamakura. She also owns a Shiba Inu named Dontaku (ドンタク).

== Discography ==
=== Albums ===
Title	Year	Details	Peak chart positions	Sales
Title	Year	Details	JPN	Sales
Chigire Gumo (ちぎれ雲)	1977	Released: 1977; Label: Polydor	—	—
Tomadoi Twilight (とまどいトワイライト)	1979	Released: 1979; Label: Polydor	—	—
Still Night (in all-caps)	1979	Released: 1979; Label: Polydor	—	—
Shukujo no Tashinami (淑女のたしなみ)	1980	Released: 1980; Label: Polydor	—	—
Lonely One (in all-caps)	1981	Released: 1981; Label: Polydor	—	—
Kitchen kara Ai wo Komete (キッチンから愛をこめて)	2009	Released: 17 June 2009; Label: Kamland	—	—
Light Mellow: Toyoshima Tazumi (LIGHT MELLOW 豊島たづみ)	2015	Released: 18 November 2015; Label: Ultra-Vybe	—	—

=== Singles ===
Title	Year	Details	Peak chart positions	Sales
Title	Year	Details	JPN	Sales
"Tomadoi Twilight" (とまどいトワイライト)	1979	Released: 1 February 1979	19	—
