= Tatsuhiko Yamamoto =

Japanese singer-songwriter (born 1954)

- Born: 山本 達彦; March 4, 1954 (age 72); Shinjuku, Tokyo, Japan
- Genres: J-Pop, Rhythm and blues, Jazz
- Occupations: Singer-songwriter, composer
- Instruments: Vocals, piano, guitar
- Years active: 1974–present
- Labels: Universal Music Japan (1978 - 1981); EMI Music Japan (1982 - 1988); Alfa Records (1990 - 1994); Ariola Japan (1996); Wonder Entertainment (1996 - 1997); Silence (1999 - present)
- Website: www.tatsuhiko-yamamoto.jp

Tatsuhiko Yamamoto (山本達彦, Yamamoto Tatsuhiko; born March 4, 1954) is a Japanese singer-songwriter and composer born in Shinjuku, Tokyo. He is considered to have helped pioneer the city pop genre.

== Early life and career ==
Yamamoto first began singing in the Tokyo Boys' Choir during his second year at Gyosei Primary School. After merging with the corresponding girls' choir, the group went on a goodwill tour through North America in 1964. During this tour, the group performed on The Ed Sullivan Show. Yamamoto has been open about having come from a supportive home that allowed him to pursue his interests freely. He also noted his own perfectionism as a child, stating that it took him until middle school to find his stride.

While attending Seikei University, he formed a band called Orange (オレンジ). Despite early initial success, including a win at the Nippon TV band contest, the band soon dissolved in 1976, two years after the release of their debut single. After graduating, Yamamoto embarked on a solo career, debuting with Sudden Wind in 1978.

== Solo success ==
Yamamoto saw continued commercial success throughout the 1980s and early 1990s, with his albums regularly appearing within the Top 20 of the Japanese Oricon Chart and being used in advertisements. Musically, those works are considered to be of the AOR and city pop genres, a mix of various sounds incorporating disco, rhythm and blues, soft rock, and jazz. He has noted the influence that his uncle's musical tastes had on him growing up and, toward the end of the 1990s and into the new millennium, experimented more with piano-driven jazz and bossa nova.

In 1999, he launched his own label, Silence.

== Influences ==
Yamamoto has cited Sergio Mendes, Jimmy Webb, Burt Bacharach, and Donny Hathaway as influences, noting that the late-1960s constitutes the time most "vibrant" to him.

== Discography ==
- Sudden Wind (1978)
- Memorial Rain (1979)
- Poker Face (1981)
- I Love You So (1982)
- Le plein soleil (1982)
- Romantic View (1983)
- Martini Hour (1983)
- Music (1984)
- My Favorites (1985)
- Mediterranee (1985)
- To Be (1986)
- Spectra (1986)
- Boom Days (1987)
- Heart Notes (1988)
- Next (1990)
- Once in My Life (1991)
- Loved One (1991)
- Sweet (1992)
- 夏がはじまる日 (1993)
- Trade Wind (1994)
- Les impressions d'un café (カフェの光景~暮色のパリ~) (1996)
- Lost Hour (1996)
- Come Rain Come Shine (1997)
- Conversations With Myself (2000)
- Final Beginnings (2000)
- Conversations With Myself II (2000)
- Conversations With Myself III (2001)
- La plage (2002)
- Croissant (2003)
- torso (2006)
- Le ciel (2008)
- Libido Game (2009)
