= EPO (singer) =

Eiko Miyagawa 宮川榮子
- Also known as: EPO
- Born: Eiko Sato; May 12, 1960 (age 66); Tokyo
- Genres: City pop, Kayōkyoku, Funk, Folk
- Labels: RCA Records, Dear Heart, Midi, Virgin Records, Toshiba EMI, Kitty Records, Warner Music Japan, Hoy-Hoy Records, Sony Music Japan, Eponica Record
- Spouse: Masahiko Miyagawa (2008–present)
- Website: www.eponica.net

Eiko Miyagawa (宮川榮子), née Eiko Sato (佐藤栄子), born May 12, 1960), known professionally as EPO, is a Japanese singer, songwriter and alternative medicine therapist who had success in the Japanese music industry in the 1980s and 1990s. Known as one of the "RCA Three Girls" in the mid-1980s alongside artists Taeko Onuki and Mariya Takeuchi on the same label, she is a prominent figure in the city pop genre that saw a revival in the late 2010s and early 2020s.

== Early life and education ==
Eiko Sato was born in Tokyo on May 12, 1960. She attended Setagaya Municipal Tamon Elementary School, where she was given the nickname 'Epo' by a friend, a mispronunciation of 'Eiko', which would later become her stage name. Sato attended Shinsei Junior High School and Matsubara High School, also in Setagaya.

During her time in Matsubara High School, Sato formed a band with classmates Nobuyuki Shimizu and Yoshiyuki Sahashi, with Sato singing backing vocals, writing and arranging songs, and playing piano. Shimizu and Sahashi would go on to become independently successful, Shimizu as a producer and keyboardist, and Sahashi as a guitarist. The two would also be frequent musical collaborators with Sato across her career as a solo artist. In 1977, in her second year of high school, Sato enrolled at the Japan Women's College of Physical Education, while recording music part-time as a session singer.

Sato had a negative relationship with her mother throughout her childhood and teenage years, and struggled with her mother's aggressive behavior caused by mental health issues. Due to her dyfunctional home life, Sato moved out at 19 years old.

== Music career ==
=== Debut–1980s ===
In 1979, Sato, working with RCA Records, (Note: Also known as RVC Records in Japan and referred to as such in some sources.) recorded vocals for the chorus of Mariya Takeuchi's single "September". The song's vocal arrangement is credited to Sato, but she only sang on the chorus, with Shigeki Miyata actually arranging the vocals. This was done to promote Sato's musical ability, as she was due to make her debut as a solo artist with RCA. Sato dropped out of Japan Women's College of Physical Education in her second year to focus on progressing her musical career.

Sato debuted as EPO on March 21, 1980, releasing a cover of Japanese band Sugar Babe's "Down Town" (stylised in all caps), a single, and an album sharing the same name. Sato was a fan of Sugar Babe, and shared a label with one of its members, Tatsuro Yamashita. Prior to the release of "Down Town", Sato was struggling with choosing a debut song. By chance, she encountered Yamashita in the lobby of RCA's recording studios, and asked him directly if she could cover "Down Town" for her debut single as EPO, to which he agreed. EPO's cover of "Down Town" was used as the ending theme of sketch comedy TV show Oretachi Hyokin-Zoku, as Yamashita is said to have refused permission for Sugar Babe's version to be used.

On November 21, 1980, EPO's second album Goodies (stylised in all caps) was released with the single "Park Avenue 1981". Some songs on Goodies were recorded in Los Angeles and New York in the United States, and featured musical contributions from both American and Japanese artists such Luther Vandross and Sugar Babe band member Taeko Onuki, both of whom performed backing vocals.

EPO's third album JOEPO ~ 1981KHz was released on September 21, 1981. A concept album, it was recorded in the style of a radio program, with songs interspersed with jingles.

EPO released her fourth album, Uwasa ni Naritai (うわさになりたい, lit. "I Want To Become a Rumour", stylised as う・わ・さ・に・な・り・た・い), on May 21, 1982, which included a new version of "Down Town". It also included the single "Girl in Me", written by Ray Parker Jr., who originally wrote the song as "Bringing Out the Girl in Me" for British soul singer Maxine Nightingale in 1979.

On April 5, 1983, EPO released her fifth album, Vitamin E・P・O (stylised in all caps). This would be her first album released under the Dear Heart label, a sub-label of RCA founded by producer Shigeki Miyata that would later become the Midi Inc. record label. The album reached number 1 on the Cash Box LPs chart and number 2 on the Music Labo albums chart. The album's single, "U, Fu, Fu, Fu" (う、ふ、ふ、ふ) became EPO's most successful single, and was used in a commercial for Shiseido cosmetics. "U, Fu, Fu, Fu" peaked at number 7 on the Oricon Weekly Singles Chart and sold 263,000 copies in 1983. Another song from Vitamin E・P・O, "Doyō no Yoruwa Paradise" (土曜の夜はパラダイス (lit. "Saturday Night is Paradise") was once again used as the ending theme for Oretachi Hyokin-Zoku. Her success at this time lead to her being called one of the "RCA Three Girls" (RCA三人娘), referring to EPO, Mariya Takeuchi, and Taeko Onuki, who were popular artists under the label.

On February 21, 1984, EPO released her sixth album, Hi・Touch-Hi・Tech (stylised in all caps). The album contained a self-cover of "Kuchibiru Nude" (くちびるヌード (lit. "Lips Nude"), a song which EPO had written for idol singer Chika Takami earlier the same year. EPO began writing songs for other idol singers around this time up until the end of the 1980s, including Yukiko Okada, Noriko Matsumoto, Akina Nakamori, Kyoko Koizumi, Miho Nakayama, and Hiroko Yakushimaru. Hi・Touch-Hi・Tech was EPO's final album under RCA records.

On March 21, 1985, EPO released Harmony (Hāmonī (ハーモニー), her seventh album overall and her first album under the Midi Inc. label, which included a cover version of Ryuichi Sakamoto's "Tibetan Dance".

On June 5, 1986, EPO released her eighth album Pump!Pump! (stylised in all caps), her first self-produced album.

EPO released her ninth album, Go Go EPO, on April 21, 1987. On December 5, 1987, EPO released her tenth album, Poptracks (stylised in all caps), a cover album of largely Japanese pop songs by her musical contemporaries, such as Tatsuro Yamashita and Minako Yoshida, as well as songwriter Yumi Matsutoya.

The same year, EPO moved to London, England, and released her eleventh album, Freestyle (stylised in all caps), on August 21, 1988. Freestyle was recorded between London and Tokyo, and became EPO's best-selling album, peaking at number 9 on the Oricon Chart. The following year, on March 21, 1989, EPO's first live album, Sparks, was released with recordings from her Freestyle tour in Japan.

On July 21, 1989, EPO released her twelfth album, Supernatural. While all the songs on Supernatural were recorded in Japanese (with the exception of an English version of the track "Everybody Knows"), the album was produced entirely in London.

=== 1990s ===
In 1991, EPO, having signed with Virgin Records in the UK, released her thirteenth album, Fire and Snow, on March 6. The album was produced by two English music producers, Steve Lovell and Steve Power.

EPO returned to Japan the same year, and released her fourteenth album Wica the following year on September 16, 1992, her first album under the Toshiba EMI label. EPO met Shigeharu Sasago, guitarist for the Brazilian music inspired band Choro Club, while working on Wica. Sasago would become a frequent musical collaborator with EPO.

On February 24, 1993, EPO released her fifteenth album, EPO Works, an acoustic self-cover album. On March 9, 1994, EPO released her sixteenth album, Voice of Ooparts, which would be her final album to appear on the Oricon Chart, peaking at number 36.

EPO released her second live album, UVA EPO Works Vol. 2, on September 27, 1995. The album contains live recordings from a month-long South American tour the same year with Choro Club and percussionist Ryo Watanabe. (Note: Another source says this tour took place in 1994, but 1995 is the year referenced most often.)

On April 9, 1997, EPO released her seventeenth album Dance (stylised in all caps), her first album under Kitty Records. On March 11, 1998, EPO released her eighteenth album, Soul Kitchen. This album contained the song "Bleeding Heart", which EPO wrote about the pain and grief she experienced from her mother's treatment of her. On her website, EPO wrote that this period of time around 1998 was "a period of great turmoil." Her father died during the production of her nineteenth album, Peach, released on June 16, 1999.

=== 2000s–2010s ===
On July 25, 2001, EPO released her twentieth album, Air (stylised in all lower case). The album contains several live recordings of self-covers. Following the release of Air, EPO would not release a new album until 2009.

On July 8, 2009, EPO released her twenty-first album Aqua Nome, her first album released by her independent label, Eponica Record. Inspired by various musical genres and world cultures, Aqua Nome includes the sounds of the morin khuur, oud, harmonium, and Mongolian throat singing. The album also includes contributions from past collaborators Shigeharu Sasago and Ryo Watanabe.

In 2011, EPO was scheduled to play two live shows on March 25 and 26 at the music venue Suidobashi Tokyo Club as part of her 30th anniversary tour. However, due to the 2011 Tōhoku earthquake and tsunami, these concerts became fundraising concerts in aid of relief efforts in the aftermath of the disaster. The shows were recorded and released as two separate live albums. Later the same year, EPO released two more live albums of recordings from concerts with the soft rock band Sentimental City Romance.

On December 4, 2013, EPO released her twenty-second album, Sacred Note〜Shinseina Oboegaki〜 (Sacred Note〜神聖な覚え書き〜).

On September 16, 2015, EPO released her twenty-third album, Ai wo～Love is On～ (愛を～Love is On～), to commemorate the 35th anniversary of her debut.

On July 5, 2017, EPO released Aquanome Live at Valley of Gangala in Okinawa, her sixth live album. EPO performed her first show at the historic Gangala Valley in Okinawa in 2016, and continued to perform there annually until 2020.

=== 2020s ===
Due to the COVID-19 pandemic in 2020, EPO had to postpone her plans to commemorate the 40th anniversary of her debut, including a live tour. The same year, EPO's music was made available on music streaming platforms, which, coinciding with the rise in popularity of city pop, began to receive increased attention via streaming from outside Japan.

On September 24, 2024, EPO's six albums released under RCA Records were re-issued on CD as part of Sony Music's Aldelight City Pop Collection.

On September 19 and September 21, 2025, EPO Best Hit Live 45th Anniversary PARTY!!, two live shows commemorating EPO's 45th debut anniversary, were performed in Tokyo and Osaka respectively. Both shows were fully sold out. Long-time collaborators and former classmates Nobuyuki Shimizu and Yoshiyuki Sahashi formed part of EPO's band for the shows.

On October 1, 2025, EPO released her twenty-fourth studio album, Epoful, as part of her 45th anniversary commemorations.

On May 31, 2026, EPO performed a Tiny Desk Concert, in a collaboration with American broadcater NPR and Japanese broadcaster NHK. She performed alongside Nobuyuki Shimizu, Yoshiyuki Sahashi, and four members of Good Bye April (stylised in all caps), a Japanese city pop inspired band who had collaborated with EPO previously.

== Artistry ==
EPO has cited Karen Carpenter as a major influence on her music, having referred to her as a "role model". Other western artists such as The Eagles, The Raspberries, and Barry Manilow influenced her work, as did songwriters Roger Nichols and Paul Williams. She has also cited jazz and soul music by African American artists as an influence across her discography. Experimental Japanese artists such as Yumi Matsutoya and soft rock band Sugar Babe, particularly Taeko Onuki, contrasted against the traditional music mainstream of Japan in the 1970s and 1980s, also served as a major influence for EPO.

In the early 1990s, EPO was introduced to the band Choro Club by a Brazilian mutual friend, who brought her to one of the band's rehearsals. EPO, having had an existing love for Brazilian music, went on to collaborate with Choro Club many times from the 1990s onwards.

== Therapeutic career ==
Due to her traumatic childhood and conflicts with her family, EPO began hypnotherapy in the late 90s. Following from this experience, she began studying to become an alternative medicine therapist. She earned a certification in the pseudoscientific practice of neuro-linguistic programming (NLP) from the National NLP Association in Japan in 2003. She later learned of American energy healing author Barbara Brennan, and travelled to America to continue her studies in alternative medicine, earning a certification from the American Board of Hypnotherapy in 2004, and began studying at the Barbara Brennan School of Healing in Miami, Florida in 2006. She graduated in 2010.

EPO runs her own therapy practice together with her husband, MUSIC&DRAMA, which she opened in Hayama, Kanagawa in April 2004.

== Personal life ==
EPO has been open about her estrangement from her family. In 2019, she published an article in women's magazine Fujin Kōron alleging physical and verbal abuse from her mother, enabled by her father, and her strained relationship with her brother. EPO has said that in 1987, her mother charged at her with a kitchen knife. After the attack, she lost consciousness, and was diagnosed with acute stress disorder in hospital. Her father died in the late 1990s, and she stopped all contact with her mother and brother in the early 2000s. Her mother died in 2017, and her brother died in 2021. She only learned that her mother had been diagnosed with mental health issues after her death from her medical records.

EPO met her husband, actor Masahiko Miyagawa, in 2003. The pair were co-stars in a stage production of The Little Prince. They married in 2012. (Note: Another source says they got married in 2008, but 2012 is the year referenced most often.) EPO was very close with her parents-in-law, and helped evacuate them to Okinawa after the 2011 Tōhoku earthquake. EPO and Miyagawa chose to remain in Okinawa after the earthquake, and have lived there ever since. Miyagawa also studied alternative medicine with EPO in America.

== Legacy ==
EPO and her discography has garnered interest and praise as part of the city pop revival of the early 2020s, with NHK calling her "one of the genre's most celebrated singers". Her music has received increased international attention since her music became available on music streaming services in September 2020. On November 25, 2025, EPO performed alongside artists such as Kiyotaka Sugiyama, Naomi Akimoto, and Yurie Kokubu as part of BS Asahi's "City Pop Studio" show, promoting the music of artists that received renewed interest due to the city pop revival. The programme aired for the first time in November 2023, and EPO has performed on every broadcast since its inception.

== Discography ==
EPO discography
- Studio albums: 24
- Live albums: 7
- Compilation albums: 12
- Singles: 25

=== Albums ===
==== Studio albums ====
Title	Details	Peak chart positions
Title	Details	Japan (Oricon)
Down Town	Released: March 21, 1980; Label: RCA Records	—
Goodies	Released: November 21, 1980; Label: RCA Records	—
JOEPO ~ 1981KHz	Released: September 21, 1981; Label: RCA Records	—
U・Wa・Sa・Ni・Na・Ri・Ta・I (う・わ・さ・に・な・り・た・い)	Released: May 21, 1982; Label: RCA Records	—
Vitamin E・P・O	Released: April 5, 1983; Label: RCA Records / Dear Heart	—
Hi・Touch-Hi・Tech	Released: February 21, 1984; Label: RCA Records / Dear Heart	—
Harmony	Released: February 21, 1984; Label: Dear Heart/Midi Inc.	—
Pump!Pump!	Released: June 5, 1986; Label: Dear Heart/Midi Inc.	—
Go Go EPO	Released: April 21, 1987; Label: Dear Heart/Midi Inc.	—
Poptracks	Released: December 5, 1987; Label: Dear Heart/Midi Inc.	15
Freestyle	Released: August 21, 1988; Label: Dear Heart/Midi Inc.	9
Supernatural	Released: July 21, 1989; Label: Dear Heart/Midi Inc.	27
Fire & Snow	Released: March 6, 1991; Label: Virgin Records	20
Wica	Released: September 16, 1992; Label: Toshiba EMI	38
EPO Works	Released: February 24, 1993; Label: Toshiba EMI	46
Voice of Ooparts	Released: March 9, 1994; Label: Toshiba EMI	36
Dance	Released: April 9, 1997; Label: Kitty Records	—
Soul Kitchen	Released: March 11, 1998; Label: Kitty Records	—
Peach	Released: June 16, 1999; Label: Kitty Records	—
Air	Released: July 21, 2001; Label: Warner Music Japan	—
Aqua Nome	Released: July 8, 2009; Label: Eponica Record	—
Sacred Note〜Shinseina Oboegaki〜 (Sacred Note〜神聖な覚え書き〜)	Released: December 4, 2013; Label: Eponica Record	—
Ai wo 〜Love is On〜 (愛を 〜Love is On〜)	Released: September 16, 2015; Label: Eponica Record	—
Epoful	Released: October 1, 2025; Label: Eponica Record	—
"—" denotes a recording that did not chart.

==== Live albums ====
Title	Details	Peak chart positions
Title	Details	Japan (Oricon)
Sparks	Released: March 21, 1989; Label: RCA Records	44
UVA EPO Works Vol. 2	Released: September 27, 1995; Label: RCA Records	—
Music Temple Tōhoku Kantō Daishinsai Fukkō Shien Live Vol. 1 (Music Temple 東北関東大震災復興支援 Live Vol. 1)	Released: March 25, 2011; Label: Hoy-Hoy Records	—
Music Temple Tōhoku Kantō Daishinsai Fukkō Shien Live Vol. 2 (Music Temple 東北関東大震災復興支援 Live Vol. 2)	Released: March 26, 2011; Label: Hoy-Hoy Records	—
EPO with Sentimental City Romance / Hit Parade Paradise (EPO with センチメンタルシティロマンス / ヒット・パレード・パラダイス)	Released: July 12, 2011; Label: Hoy-Hoy Records	—
EPO with Sentimental City Romance / Hit Parade Paradise Summer (EPO with センチメンタルシティロマンス / ヒット・パレード・パラダイス SUMMER)	Released: July 28, 2012; Label: Hoy-Hoy Records	—
Aquanome Live at Valley of Gangala in Okinawa	Released: July 5, 2017; Label: Eponica Record	—
"—" denotes a recording that did not chart.

==== Compilation Albums ====
Title	Details	Peak chart positions
Title	Details	Japan (Oricon)
The Best Station JOEPO 1980-1984	Released: March 21, 1989; Label: RCA / Dear Heart	—
The Very Best of EPO	Released: December 5, 1986; Label: Dear Heart / Midi Inc.	—
The Ballads	Released: December 10, 1989; Label: Dear Heart / Midi Inc.	47
CM Tracks	Released: November 21, 1990; Label: Dear Heart / Midi Inc.	—
Single Tracks	Released: November 1, 1991; Label: Midi Inc.	—
The Best 1980-1990	Released: December 21, 1992; Label: Midi Inc.	—
Kaui-Uta no Tani (カウイ 唄の谷 )	Released: December 7, 1994; Label: Toshiba EMI	—
Epocha 1980-1986	Released: June 23, 1999; Label: RCA Ariola	—
Travessia ~ EPO'S Best 1980-1999	Released: December 1, 1999; Label: Midi Inc.	—
Golden☆Best EPO (ゴールデン☆ベスト EPO)	Released: April 20, 2005; Label: Midi Inc.	—
Golden☆Best EPO EMI YEARS (ゴールデン☆ベスト EPO EMI YEARS)	Released: February 23, 2011; Label: Toshiba EMI	—
Golden☆Best EPO ～The BEST 80’s Director’s Edition～	Released: December 7, 2011; Label: Sony Music Direct	—
"—" denotes a recording that did not chart.

=== 1980s ===
Year	Title	Peak chart positions	Album
Year	Title	Japan (Oricon)	Album
1980	"Down Town"	—	Down Town
1980	"Park Avenue 1981"	—	Goodies
1982	"Girl in Me"	—	Uwasa ni Naritai
1982	"Doyō no Yoruwa Paradise" (土曜の夜はパラダイス)	—	Vitamin E・P・O
1983	"U, Fu, Fu, Fu," (う、ふ、ふ、ふ)	7	Vitamin E・P・O
1984	"Koi wa High-Touch - High-Tech" (恋はハイ・タッチ–ハイ・テック)	—	Hi・Touch-Hi・Tech
1985	"Watashi ni Tsuite" (私について)	—	Harmony
1985	"Ongaku no Yōna Kaze" (音楽のような風)	—	Pump!Pump!
1985	"12 Tsuki no April Fool" (12月のエイプリール・フール)	—	Pump!Pump!
1986	"Nagisa no Monument" (渚のモニュメント)	—	Pump!Pump!
1986	"Taiyō ni Pump! Pump!" (太陽にPump! Pump!)	—	Pump!Pump!
1986	"Alley Cats" (アレイ・キャッツ)	—	Pump!Pump!
1987	"Down Town Rhapsody" (Down Townラプソディー)	—	Go Go EPO
1987	"Kuroi Hitomi no Girlfriend" (黒い瞳のガールフレンド)	—	Go Go EPO
1987	"Yumemi Chinatown" (夢見ちゃいなタウン)	—	Poptracks
1987	"San-Banme no Shiawase" (三番目の幸せ)	—	Poptracks
1989	"Futari no Destiny" (ふたりのDestiny)	—	'Non-album single'
1989	"Everybody Knows"	—	Supernatural
"—" denotes a recording that did not chart or was not released in that territory.

=== 1990s - 2000s ===
Year	Title	Peak chart positions	Album
Year	Title	Japan (Oricon)	Album
1990	"Life in Tokyo"	—	'Non-album single'
1991	"Hoshi ni Narenakatta Namida" (星に なれなかった 涙)	—	Fire & Snow
1991	"When 2 R In Love"	—	Fire & Snow
1992	"Aru Chō, Kaze ni Fukarete" (ある朝、風に吹かれて)	24	EPO Works
1996	"Kibō no Basu ni Notte" (希望のバスに乗って)	—	Dance
1997	"Seiki Kare no Hito" (聖き彼の人)	—	Dance
2006	"We Can"	—	'Non-album single'
"—" denotes a recording that did not chart or was not released in that territory.
