= Kingo Hamada =

Japanese singer-songwriter (born 1953)

Kingo Hamada 濱田 金吾
- Born: January 17, 1953 (age 73); Shinjuku, Tokyo, Japan
- Genres: J-pop; city pop
- Occupations: Vocalist; composer
- Instruments: Bass guitar, guitar, keyboards
- Years active: 1974–present
- Labels: Air Records; Alfa Moon; Toshiba EMI
- Website: kingohamada.com

Kingo Hamada (濱田 金吾, Hamada Kingo) (born January 17, 1953) is a Japanese singer-songwriter.

== Life and career ==
Hamada was a member of the folk group Craft before pursuing a solo career.

At one point, when Shōgo Hamada, who was not related to Kingo, was becoming popular, the latter's agency and record label gave him the tagline "When you think of Hamada, you think of Kingo" (ハマダといえば、キンゴで〜す, Hamada to ieba, Kingo de〜su).

== Impact ==
In 2017, "Crystal Dolphin" by Engelwood sampled "Machi no Dorufin" from Hamada's 1982 midnight cruisin' album. "Crystal Dolphin" later became a popular Internet meme. The original song, Machi No Dorufin, gained widespread prominence as a result of Engelwood's sample.

== Discography ==
=== Singles ===
Title	B-Side	Details
MAY SICK	"SUNRISE-SUNSET"	Released: January 21, 1980; Label: Air Records; Format: EP
HOTEL SURF-RIDER	"LONELY WIND"	Released: June 21, 1981; Label: Air Records; Format: EP
Portrait Woman	"Ondine"	Released: February 2, 1981; Label: Air Records; Format: LP
N.Y.CITY MARATHON	"SENTIMENTAL MOMENT"	Released: November 5, 1981; Label: Air Records; Format: EP
GATSBY WOMAN	"SO, I LOVE YOU"	Released: August 10, 1983; Label: Alfa Moon; Format: EP
Kokoro no mama ni Once Again	"Cool Heart"	Released: August 22, 1985; Label: Toshiba EMI/Eastworld; Formats: EP

=== Studio albums ===
Title	Details
Manhattan in the Rain	Released: January 21, 1980; Label: Air Records; Format: LP
Gentle Travelin'	Released: February 21, 1981; Label: Air Records; Format: LP
Feel the Night	Released: November 5, 1981; Label: Air Records; Format: LP
midnight cruisin'	Released: October 21, 1982; Label: Alfa Moon; Format: LP
Mugshot	Released: August 24, 1983; Label: Alfa Moon; Format: LP
Heart Cocktail	LP Released: March 1, 1985; CD Released: March 21, 1985; Label: Toshiba EMI/Eastworld; Formats: LP, CD
Fall in Love	LP Released: October 19, 1985; CD Released: December 21, 1985; Label: Toshiba EMI/Eastworld; Formats: LP, CD

=== Compilation albums ===
Title	Details
From NY to LA	Released: March 5, 1986; Label: Air Records; Format: LP
Best Collection ~Moon Years~	Released: February 27, 2002; Label: East West Japan; Format: CD
Kingo Hamada Golden☆Best	Released: July 26, 2006; Label: BMG Japan; Format: CD
