= Gulp (restaurant) =

Taiwanese restaurant

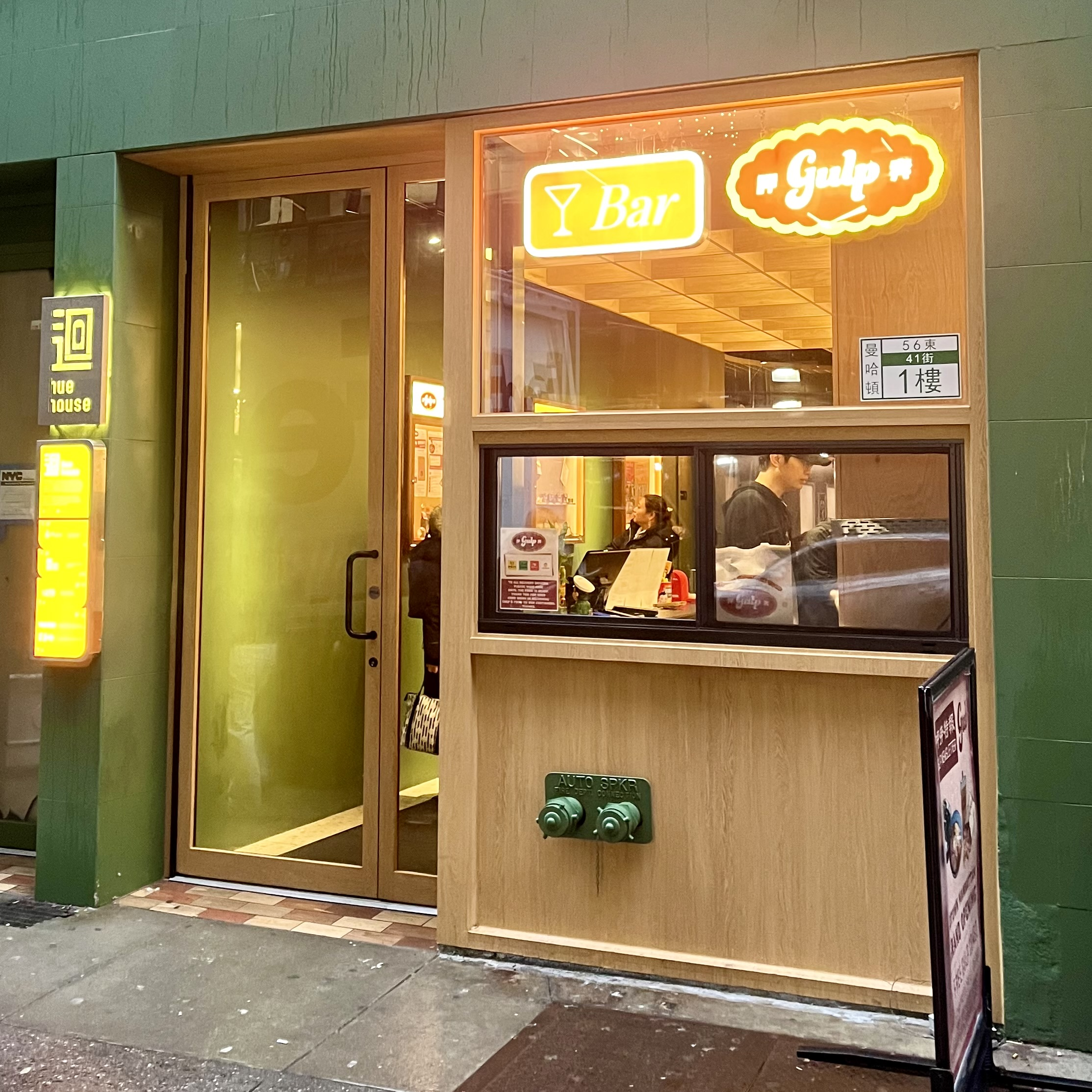
- The Hue House location in 2025
- Interactive map of Gulp

Restaurant information
- Location: 56 E 41st Street, Manhattan, New York, United States
- Coordinates: 40.7517°N 73.9789°W

Gulp is a Taiwanese restaurant. It has two locations in New York City, New York and one in Jersey City, New Jersey. On July 28, 2025, Eater named Gulp's Taiwanese breakfast in its best dishes of the week.

== History ==
In May 2023, Gulp opened its first location in Long Island City with an accompanying Cantopop and Mandopop–themed bar in the back called 929. It was a three-way partnership between William Guo, Haoran Chen, and Jeff Liu.

In June 2025, Gulp opened its second location in Jersey City, in a space formerly used by a bubble tea shop.

In November 2025, the team behind Gulp and 929 launched Hue House, an Asian cultural hub in Midtown Manhattan which includes several Asian establishments. There, a third location for Gulp was opened.
