= Eiko Hiraiwa =

Japanese singer-songwriter (1971-2021)

Eiko Hiraiwa 平岩 英子
- Born: 17 February 1971; Hiroshima, Japan
- Died: 31 March 2021 (aged 50)
- Genres: Pop
- Occupation: Singer-songwriter
- Instrument: Vocals
- Years active: 1995–2000
- Labels: Epic Records Japan; Village Records
- Spouse: Akiro Arishima

Eiko Hiraiwa (平岩 英子, Hiraiwa Eiko; 17 February 1971 – 31 March 2021) was a Japanese singer-songwriter. After studying Dalcroze eurhythmics as a child and college student, she made her major-label debut in 1995. She released several singles and albums with Epic Records Japan and Village Records until 2000, entering into a hiatus afterwards.

== Biography ==
Eiko Hiraiwa was born on 17 February 1971 in Hiroshima, and started studying eurhythmics and piano as a young child. She graduated from Hiroshima Music High School and the Kunitachi College of Music, where she continued her eurhythmics studies. Following an audition where a demo tape of hers reached the attention of Japan's record industry, she joined Epic Records Japan and made her major label debut with the single "Watashi ga Watashi de aru Toki" (私が私である時), released on 21 July 1995; she also released her debut album Deep Breath with that same label the same day. Asahigraph called it "a refreshing album that revitalizes the listener's heart", remarking that it "showcases her talents not only as a vocalist but also in songwriting and vocal arrangement".

Hiraiwa released three more albums with Epic Records - Airium (1997), Eureka (1998), and Vesta (1998) - as well as six singles: "Kaze ni Fukarete" (1995), "Cara Cara", "Snow Field: Kowareru hodo Omotteita" (both 1996), "Sotsugyō" (1997), and "Natsu no Kōsui" (1998). In 2000, she released an album Nudy Camera and a single "Naiteiru Hito" under a different label, Village Records, and afterwards her musical career entered into a hiatus. CDJournal remarked that she became known for a "clear, crystalline vocal style", as well as "refreshing vocals and a sound characterized by acoustic textures".

In addition to her singing career, Hiraiwa wrote two songs: Hiraiwa's "Kinō Mita Yume no yō ni" and Ryōko Hirosue's "Aoi Sora ni Ukabu Tsuki no Yō ni".

Hiraiwa was married to Akiro Arishima. She died on 31 March 2021. Her 1997 song "Kinō Mita Yume no yō ni" appeared in the 2024 city pop compilation City Pop Groovy '90s: Girls & Boys.

== Discography ==
=== Albums ===
Title	Details
Deep Breath	Released: 21 July 1995; Label: Epic Records Japan
Airium	Released: 21 May 1997; Label: Epic Records Japan
Eureka (ユリイカ)	Released: 21 January 1998; Label: Epic Records Japan
Vesta (stylized in all-caps)	Released: 18 July 1998; Label: Epic Records Japan
Nudy Camera (stylized in small-caps)	Released: 22 November 2000; Label: Village Records

=== Singles ===
Title	Details
"Watashi ga Watashi de aru Toki" (私が私である時)	Released: 21 July 1995; Label: Epic Records Japan
"Kaze ni Fukarete" (風に吹かれて)	Released: 21 October 1995; Label: Epic Records Japan
"Cara Cara" (カラカラ)	Released: 21 September 1996; Label: Epic Records Japan
"Snow Field: Kowareru hodo Omotteita" (Snow Field～こわれるほど想っていた～)	Released: 21 November 1996; Label: Epic Records Japan
"Sotsugyō" (卒業)	Released: 21 February 1997; Label: Epic Records Japan
"Natsu no Kōsui" (夏の香水)	Released: 21 June 1998; Label: Epic Records Japan
"Naiteiru Hito" (泣いている人)	Released: 21 September 2000; Label: Village Records
