= Ryusenkei =

Japanese music project

Ryusenkei (stylized in all caps) is a Japanese music project that began as a band in 2001. After 2006, it was a solo effort led by Kunimondo Takiguchi with numerous guest members rotating in and out. Later, in the 2020s, Takiguchi rebranded the project to have Ryusenkei spelled out in Latin script rather than kanji, and in 2024, an album titled Illusion was released with Sincere, a solo singer-songwriter, as its second official member alongside Takiguchi.

== History ==
The group formed in 2001, as Ryūsenkei (流線形) in kanji, and released their debut album, City Music, in 2003. From 2006 and onward, Ryūsenkei dissolved as a group but remained a solo effort maintained by Takiguchi with guest vocalists.

On November 11, 2020, Takiguchi and musician Hitomitoi released a collaborative album, titled Talio, under the name of Ryūsenkei/Hitomitoi (流線形/一十三十一), for the NHK drama Talio: Avenger Buddies. The album was released under the Japanese label JVCKenwood Victor Entertainment.

In August 2022, Ryusenkei released a mini album, Incomplete, with both original songs and covers sung by guest vocalist Yasuyuki Horigome. On March 18 and 21, 2023, Ryusenkei and Horigome performed a live set in Osaka and Japan, respectively, with an accompanying band.

On July 24, 2024, Ryusenkei released an album titled Illusion on the Alfa Music label newly rebooted by Takiguchi, marking the project's first album with the solo artist Sincere as an official member alongside Takiguchi. The project also changed its name from Ryūsenkei (流線形) in kanji to Ryusenkei in Latin script, with all capital letters. In the lead-up to Illusion's release, Ryusenkei had released the English single "Moon Pulse," as well as "Super Generation," the latter of which came with an accompanying music video directed by Hiroto Sawato. The duo had also held an in-store event at the Shibuya location of Tower Records which included autographs and Sincere's first-ever live performance.

== Critical reception ==
Ryusenkei is one of the projects considered to be at the front of Japan's city pop genre, with Takiguchi oftentimes named to be one of its frontmen. However, Takiguchi has turned down such a label, stating that he doesn't think about his music in terms of city pop, nor is he interested in calling his music by such a term.
