= Tomoko Soryo =

Japanese singer (born 1952)

Tomoko Soryo 惣領 智子
- Born: Tomoko Yoshihara; 17 September 1952 (age 73)
- Origin: Tokyo, Japan
- Genres: City pop
- Occupations: Singer; songwriter; composer
- Instrument: Vocals
- Labels: RCA Records; Toshiba-EMI; Polystar
- Formerly of: Brown Rice; Tinna
- Spouse: Yasunori Soryo (divorced) Toshiro Abe (m. 1991)

Tomoko Soryo (Japanese: 惣領 智子, Hepburn: Sōryō Tomoko; born 17 September 1952) is a Japanese singer. After serving as a member of Brown Rice in the early-1970s United States, she returned to Japan and released several albums, some of which were with her husband Yasunori Soryo or as part of the duo Tinna. Following her retirement, her work regained popularity with the 2010s boom of city pop.

== Life and career ==
Tomoko Soryo, a native of Tokyo, was born on 17 September 1952, and was educated at the Kunitachi College of Music. In 1971, she made her singing debut as part of the group Brown Rice, and in 1972 started performing in the United States alongside them.

After Brown Rice disbanded in 1975, Soryo then returned to Japan to make her solo debut under producer Yasunori Soryo. She subsequently released two albums Yasashiku Aishite (1976) and City Lights by the Moonlight (1977). In 1978, a greatest hits album named Tomoko Now and Then was released, marking the first time her songs Aventure and Kagerou were released. These three albums were released under RCA Records Japan. She released several singles such as Owari no Nai Uta / Dekiru Koto wa Hitotsu (1978), the former of which was the theme song of the TBS drama Ai ga Watashi o. She also released a soundtrack album for Bourbon Records.

Following her first two albums, Soryo and fellow Brown Rice member Mariko Takahashi formed the musical duo Tinna, releasing four albums together as part of Toshiba-EMI's Express record label. In 1981, she released her album It's About Time under Express. She produced her fourth album Momentary with Yasunori Soryo, released under Polystar's Popstar label.

In addition to being a singer, Soryo was a songwriter and composer. She wrote the vast majority of the content in It's About Time, and she wrote every non-English word and composed almost every track in Momentary.

After her singing career ended, Soryo settled in Okinawa in 2001, and she started a career as a meditation instructor in 2002. In March 2017, Sony Music Japan released Tomoko Soryo: RCA Years, a two-disc compilation album featuring her work with RCA.

== Personal life ==
Soryo lived in Setagaya before moving next to Lake Hatori in Ten-ei, Fukushima. She was manager of the adult guesthouse Pig Bear Club (ピッグ・ベア・クラブ), where she would often hold after-dinner live performances for the guests.

She was married to Yasunori Soryo, leader of Brown Rice, until they divorced. Originally known as Tomoko Yoshihara (吉原 智子, Yoshihara Tomoko) during her time with Brown Rice, she adopted her husband's surname after they married. In 1991, she married Toshiro Abe.

== Legacy and themes ==
With the 2010s boom of city pop, Soryo's music regained popularity. Her song "I Say Who" was included in the 2019 city pop compilation Pacific Breeze: Japanese City Pop, AOR and Boogie 1976–1986, becoming that album's first track. Her fourth original album, Momentary, was re-released on 19 April 2023. In September 2023, Toshikazu Kanazawa's Light Mellow series released an album centered on Soryo in response to that growing demand. Some of her releases, including It's About Time or her Tinna releases, received their first CD editions.

Masayuki Baba of Mikiki called Soryo "a nostalgic figure for the new music and city pop generations of the late 1970s". Chris Ingalls of PopMatters said that "I Say Who", "with its sugary harmonies, electric piano, and swooping strings, brings the sounds of ’70s disco to downtown Tokyo." CD Journal noted that the titular song of City Lights by the Moonlight was retrospectively "highly acclaimed as a masterpiece of the city pop genre".

Baba remarked that It’s About Time is "packed with the kind of high-quality pop music that perfectly captured the spirit of the era", and that her "exhilarating pop sounds" in her Light Mellow album "transcend the boundaries of time". Baba also said that "her signature vocal style", particularly within her post-Tinna albums, was "a voice brimming with refreshing clarity". CD Journal noted that Soryo's "growth, both as a woman and as an artist, was an inevitable evolution, and one cannot help but be entranced by these songs and her beautiful voice".

Regarding Soryo's genre, CD Journal said that she made a debut album contemporary transition between folk music and new music, and though her second album drew on electric instruments, horns, and string instruments, before "significantly expanding her artistic scope" with It's About Time.

== Discography ==
=== Original albums ===
Title	Details
Yasashiku Aishite	Released: 1976; Label: RCA Records
City Lights by the Moonlight	Released: 1977; Label: RCA Records
It's About Time (stylized in all-caps)	Released: 1981; Label: Express
Momentary	Released: 25 August 1989; Label: Polystar

=== Compilation albums ===
Title	Details
Tomoko Now and Then	Released: 1978; Label: RCA Records
Tomoko Soryo: RCA Years	Released: 30 March 2017; Label: Sony Music Japan
Light Mellow: Tomoko Soryo	Released: 20 September 2023; Label: Steps Records

=== Singles ===
Title	Year	Details	Peak chart positions	Sales	Ref.
Title	Year	Details	JPN	Sales	Ref.
"Owari no Nai Uta" (終りのない歌)	1978	Released: 5 July 1978; Label: BMG Victor	21	—	
"Tsubasa" (翼)	1989	Released: 25 August 1989; Label: Polystar	—	—	
"Hana" (花)	1990	Released: 21 December 1990; Label: Polystar	—	—	
