= Murahachibu ostracism =

Japanese shunning punishment

Murahachibu (村八分) refers to punishment in rural communities for residents who violate rules or customs. It is a form of collective ostracism in which villagers join together to sever social ties with the offender.

By extension, the term is also used to refer to actions that exclude specific individuals from a community or bully certain group members.

== Etymology ==
The etymology of the word is obscure. Mura means village, while hachibu is written with characters meaning "eight parts". A popular folk etymology suggests that those ostracized were banned from all village activities except two parts, namely funerals and firefighting. However, there is little historical evidence to support this, and the word may instead be a corruption of hajiku (はじく), "to shun".

== Overview ==
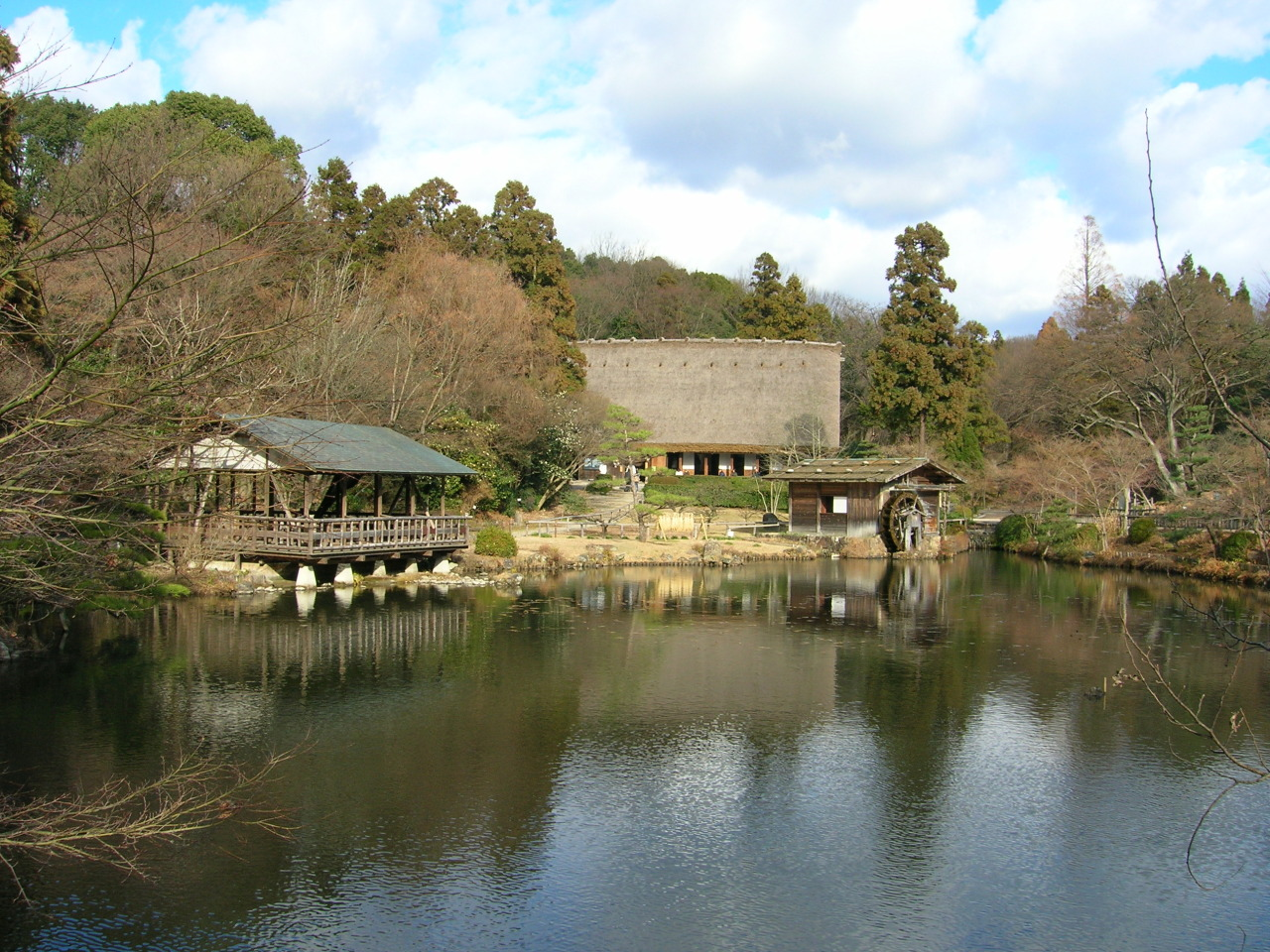
House from Rural Village.

Murahachibu were well-known self-governing sanctions imposed by village (mura in Japanese) communities during the Edo period (1603–1868). There were three levels of punishment in order of severity of the offense: fines, severing ties, and expulsion.

Generally, fines, the lightest penalty, were applied. On the other hand, social exclusion and expulsion denied the household's membership in the village and were very fierce sanctions.

Expulsion could mean complete removal from the village, sometimes even prohibiting the individual from residing in nearby areas. Often, however, expelled people were forced to the outskirts of the village, leading to solitary life in an isolated house.

The rupture associated with murahachibu not only included the severing of social ties but also involved active persecutory actions, such as forcing the individuals to wear a red hood, attaching ropes to them, causing distress by ringing bells in an adjacent area, or tying their door with bamboo. Additionally, according to regions, various supplementary sanctions were imposed, such as prohibiting access to communal mountain lands and resources.

A notable post-war incident occurred in 1952 in Ueno Village (current Fujinomiya City), Fuji District, Shizuoka Prefecture, the Ueno Village Murahachibu Incident. A high school girl who reported village-wide fraud in a House of Councilors by-election was subjected to murahachibu along with her family.
