= Shoji Suzuki =

Shoji Suzuki (鈴木 章治, Suzuki Shōji; August 16, 1932 – September 10, 1995) was a Japanese jazz clarinet player and band leader nicknamed the "Benny Goodman of Japan".

== Life ==
Shoji Suzuki was born in Yokohama City, Kanagawa Prefecture. His father Saburo was a violin player who performed in an orchestra that accompanied silent films. His elder brother Toshio was a piano player, and his younger brothers both Koich and Masao were clarinet and saxophone players. Shoji Suzuki started his professional musician life as an alto saxophone player for a cabaret in 1947. Then he was also a member of Toriro Miki's Band formed by Toriro Miki. He entered Azumanians that was a jazz clarinet player Matsujiro Azuma's band in 1949, he came under the influence of Matsujiro Azuma and became a jazz clarinet player. He entered Hachiro Matsui And Tokyo Jive in 1950. After he played and learned dixieland jazz in Fumio Nanri And His Hot Peppers, he entered Misao Ikeda's Rhythm Kings. He formed his band Rhythm Aces with a vibraphone player Saburo Nambe, a piano player Yoshitaka Akimitsu, a drum player Isamu Harada and so on in 1953.

== Shoji Suzuki And Rhythm Aces activity ==
Benny Goodman's Band came to Tokyo Japan in January 1957, Benny Goodman and Peanuts Hucko, the lead alto saxophone player of Benny Goodman's Band, listened to Shoji Suzuki And Rhythm Aces playing in a club in Ginza, Tokyo. Benny Goodman acclaimed that he was an excellent star with a personality of his own. Peanuts Hucko favored "Suzukake No Michi" that Shoji Suzuki And Rhythm Aces was playing, Peanuts Hucko as a clarinet player attended Shoji Suzuki And Rhythm Aces recording and recorded "Suzukake No Michi" (鈴懸の径, means "Platanus Road") at the Radio Tokyo Hall in Yūrakuchō, Tokyo, on January 17, 1957. This recording broke the record of jazz record sales in Japan. By this opportunity, Shoji Suzuki And Rhythm Aces increased in further popularity, they played at Eddie Condon's Club in New York City during three weeks in 1966 and realized to hold a concert at the Carnegie Hall in 1982. Shoji Suzuki died on September 10, 1995, in Japan.
