= City pop =

1970s Japanese pop music genre

- Native name: シティ・ポップ
- Stylistic origins: Pop; new music; funk; R&B; disco; electronic; soft rock; yacht rock; AOR; jazz fusion; boogie; soul; Okinawan; bossa nova; Latin; Caribbean; Polynesian
- Cultural origins: Mid-1970s, Japan
- Derivative forms: Vaporwave; future funk; pop kreatif

Other topics
- J-pop

City pop (Japanese: シティ・ポップ, Hepburn: shiti poppu) is a loosely defined form of Japanese pop music that emerged in the mid-1970s and peaked in popularity during the 1980s. It was originally termed as an offshoot of Japan's Western-influenced "new music", but came to include a range of styles—including funk, disco, R&B, AOR, soft rock, and boogie—that were associated with Japan's nascent economic boom and leisure class. It was identified with new technologies such as the Walkman, cars with built-in cassette decks and FM stereos, and various electronic musical instruments.

There is no consensus among scholars regarding the definition of city pop. In Japan, the term referred to music that projected an "urban" feel and whose target demographic was urbanites. Many city pop artists did not embrace Japanese influences, and instead largely drew from American funk, soft rock and boogie. Some songs feature tropical flourishes or elements taken from disco, jazz fusion, Okinawan, Latin and Caribbean music.

The singer-songwriter Tatsuro Yamashita, one of the most successful city pop artists, is sometimes called the "king" of city pop. The band Yellow Magic Orchestra and its members are also credited for influencing the styles of mixing and arrangement that became central to the genre.

City pop lost its mainstream appeal after the 1980s and was derided by later Japanese generations. In the early 2010s, partly through the influence of music-sharing blogs and Japanese reissues, city pop gained an international online following and became important to the sample-based microgenres known as vaporwave and future funk.

== Definitions ==
Definitions of "city pop" have varied and many of the artists labelled with the genre have played in styles that are significantly different from each other. Yutaka Kimura, an author of numerous books about city pop, defined the genre as "urban pop music for those with urban lifestyles". In 2015, Ryotaro Aoki wrote in The Japan Times:

The term was originally used to describe an offshoot of the emerging Western-influenced "new music" of the 1970s and '80s. "City pop" referred to the likes of Sugar Babe and Eiichi Ohtaki, artists who scrubbed out the Japanese influences of their predecessors and introduced the sounds of jazz and R&B—genres said to have an "urban" feel—to their music. ... The term has drifted in and out of the musical lexicon ever since. ... With a term as vague and broad as city pop, it's natural that no one seems to be agreeing on what the label actually means anymore.

Jon Blistein of Rolling Stone concurred that city pop was "less a strict genre term than a broad vibe classification". According to Japan Archival Series supervisor Yosuke Kitazawa, there "were no restrictions on style or a specific genre that we wanted to convey with these songs" but that it "was music made by city people, for city people". Kitazawa identified two distinct styles that exemplified city pop: "the former a lush, tropical romp, the latter a thumping rug-cutter".

PopMatters' Chris Ingalls categorized city pop as "a type of soft rock/AOR/funk", while Pitchfork's Joshua Minsoo Kim called it "a vague descriptor for Japanese music that incorporated jazz and R&B". Wax Poetics' Ed Motta wrote, "City pop is really AOR and soft rock but with some funk and boogie too. Because when you hear funkier city pop tunes, you hear not only the influence, but in some parts they steal from groups like Skyy, BB&Q Band, and those kinda American boogie and funk groups." An Electronic Beats writer characterized city pop as Japan's "answer to synth pop and disco".

== Origins ==
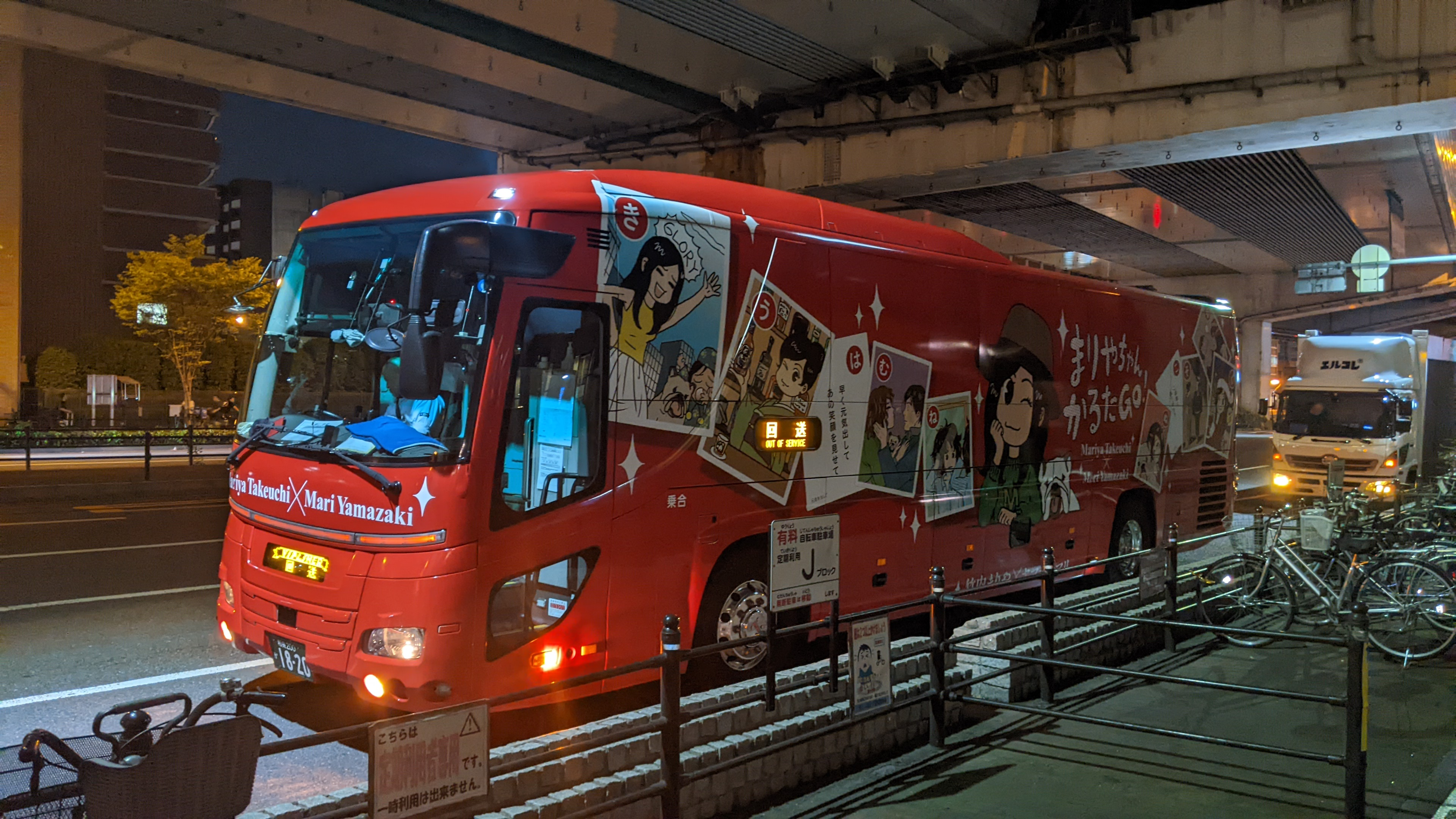
A VIP Liner bus with drawings of the city pop singer Mariya Takeuchi by Mari Yamazaki

The catchphrase for the Japanese promotion of Terry Melcher's second album, Royal Flush (1976), was "Mellow (Mexican Country Hollywood) City Pop!". The Higurashi single "Orange Train" (1977) and the Tomoko Soryo album City Lights by the Moonlight (1977) were marketed with the phrase "city pops". In July 1977, an article in the music magazine Record Geijutsu introduced Minako Yoshida, Takao Kisugi, Tatsuro Yamashita, and Jun Fukamachi, Yoninbayashi, Junko Ohashi (Minoya Central Station), and others as "city pops" musicians. The term "city pops" began to be used as a music genre. Furthermore, some Japanese music and entertainment magazines described Eric Carmen as "New York City Pop style" and the Alessi Brothers, who came to Japan, as the leaders of "American City Pops".

"City pop(s)" is a Japanese-made English term that record companies and music magazine editors began using in the late 1970s to promote and review music with an urban and sophisticated atmosphere. Its usage was not strict, and it was sometimes used for songs and musicians classified as Japanese folk rock (フォークソング, lit. 'folk song') rather than city pop from today's perspective. At that time, the term "city pops" was used more often than "city pop". The term "city music" was also used. For example, the term was used in an article introducing Sugar Babe (active period: 1973–1976) and its members Taeko Onuki and Tatsuro Yamashita after its breakup. City music was also used for Yoshitaka Minami, Yumi Arai, Minako Yoshida, and Akiko Yano. Sugar Babe's 1975 album Songs is said to be a pioneer of city pop, although the term was not in widespread use at the time.

In a book published in 2002, music critic Yutaka Kimura redefined city pop(s) as "Japanese city pop", attributing its origin to Happy End (1969–1972), despite Happy End being an unsuccessful band with little influence at the time. This is criticized as a "Happy End historical view" (はっぴいえんど史観), although each member of Happy End was active in the Japanese rock and pop music scene after the band broke up. The term "city pop" has since become predominant, probably due to the popularity of the term "J-pop" that spread in the 1990s.

Musically, city pop applies songwriting and arranging techniques commonly found in jazz – such as major seventh and diminished chords – that are drawn directly from the American soft rock of the era (bands such as Steely Dan and the Doobie Brothers). Yutaka cited the band Happy End as "ground zero" for the genre, whereas Motta traces it to the mid-1970s with the work of Haruomi Hosono and Tatsuro Yamashita. Vice contributor Rob Arcand similarly credited Hosono as a "key influence" on city pop. In the mid-1970s, Hosono founded the band Tin Pan Alley, which fused southern R&B, northern soul and jazz fusion with Hawaiian and Okinawan tropical flourishes. In the view of Fact Mag's Mikey I.Q. Jones, this led to the style of music that would be dubbed "city pop". Hawaiian singer Carrie Ann Inaba, who briefly sang in the genre in the late 1980s before returning to the United States, remarked that the Japanese music industry of the era placed little artistic emphasis on the vocalists, reducing them to a "face (that) becomes a logo they sell."

The genre became closely tied to the tech boom in Japan during the 1970s and 1980s. Some of the Japanese technologies which influenced city pop included the Walkman, cars with built-in cassette decks and FM stereos, and various electronic musical instruments such as the Casio CZ-101 and Yamaha CS-80 synthesizers and the Roland TR-808 drum machine. According to Blistein, electronic instruments and gadgets "allowed musicians to actualise the sounds in their heads" and cassette decks "allowed fans to dub copies of albums". According to Blistein: "An opulent amalgamation of pop, disco, funk, R&B, boogie, jazz fusion, Latin, Caribbean and Polynesian music, the genre was inextricably tied to a tech-fueled economic bubble and the wealthy new leisure class it created."

== Popularity ==
City pop became a distinct regional genre that peaked in popularity during the 1980s. According to Vice, the most popular figures of the genre were "accomplished composers and producers in their own right, with artists like Tatsuro Yamashita and Toshiki Kadomatsu incorporating complex arrangements and songwriting techniques into their hits. The booming economy also made it easier for them to get label funding". Yamashita is sometimes referred to as the "king" of city pop. City pop also influenced instrumental jazz fusion bands such as Casiopea and T-Square, which subsequently influenced Japanese video game music. City pop's influence also spread to Indonesia, leading to the development of a local style known as pop kreatif. The genre lost mainstream appeal after the 1980s. In the description of Kitazawa, "Many Japanese people who grew up with this kind of music considered city pop as cheesy, mainstream, disposable music, going so far as calling it 'shitty pop'."

=== 21st century resurgence ===
Since the 2010s, city pop has seen a resurgence with artists such as Mariya Takeuchi gaining an international online following, as well as becoming a touchstone for the sample-based microgenres known as vaporwave and future funk. Kim credited "Blogspot blogs and Japanese reissues" circa 2010 with "introduc[ing] music nerds to a strain of AOR, funk, disco, and yacht rock trafficked under the amorphous term ... The music had largely been neglected by Westerners and derided by many Japanese as cheesy, but as YouTube algorithms launched songs into the wider collective consciousness, city pop surged in popularity ..." In 2020, The Japan Times contributor Patrick St. Michel reported that, "Abroad, boutique labels are reissuing rare records or releasing compilations, though millions have largely experienced city pop through songs such as [Takeuchi's 1984 song] "Plastic Love" or the seemingly endless playlists backed by anime snippets on YouTube." Another song of the genre that similarly regained popularity was "Mayonaka no Door (Stay with Me)" by Miki Matsubara in 2020, eventually taking the No. 1 spot on Spotify's global viral chart for the week of 10–16 December and breaking Apple Music's J-pop top 10 in 92 different markets. Artist Ginger Root has cited city pop as influential on his music. It has been said that the city pop boom was the beginning of a period of increased interest in Showa retro. In parallel with its global boom, Japanese city pop has sparked a revival of Indonesia's dormant pop kreatif genre, which has seen renewed popularity among the country's youth under the colloquial term, "Indonesian City Pop."

In 2022, Universal Music Japan reissued limited editions of a total of 107 albums from the 1970s and '80s under "City Pop Selections by Universal Music", showing the resurgence of popularity of the city pop genre. Another collection is the Aldelight City Pop Collection (2023) from Sony Music. Compilation albums include Pacific Breeze: Japanese City Pop, AOR and Boogie 1976–1986 (2019), City Pop Story - Urban & Ocean (2023), (Note: The CD is catalogue number MHCL-30829〜30. The vinyl LP, with extra tracks, is catalogue number MHJL 288~9.) City Music Tokyo (2023), City Pop Stories - '70s & '80s (2024), and City Pop Groovy '90s - Girls & Boys (2024).

== See also ==
- List of city pop artists
- Beach music, contemporary R&B, enka, new jack swing, urban contemporary, yacht rock, sophisti-pop: related music genres
- Pop kreatif: Indonesian derivative of Japanese city pop
- Video game music

== Bibliography ==
- Kimura, Yutaka, ed. (2011). ジャパニーズ･シティ･ポップ (ディスク･コレクション) [Japanese City Pop (Disc Collection)] (in Japanese) (Shohan ed.). Tōkyō: Shinko Music Entertainment. ISBN 978-4-401-63618-1.
- Kurimoto, Hitoshi (23 February 2022). 「シティポップの基本」がこの100枚でわかる! [The "basics of city pop" can be found in these 100 albums!] (in Japanese). Seikaisha. ISBN 978-4-06-527086-8.
- Shibasaki, Yuji; Kishino, Yuichi; Sommet, Moritz; Kato, Ken; Hasegawa, Yohei (22 April 2022). Shibasaki, Yuji (ed.). シティポップとは何か [What is City Pop?] (in Japanese). Kawade Shobo Shinsha. ISBN 978-4-309-29160-4.
