= Genki o Dashite =

1984 song by Hiroko Yakushimaru

Song by Hiroko Yakushimaru

from the album Kokinshū
- Released: February 14, 1984
- Genre: J-pop
- Length: 4:00
- Songwriter: Mariya Takeuchi

Genki o Dashite (元気を出して, Cheer Up) is a song written by Japanese singer-songwriter Mariya Takeuchi and first recorded by Hiroko Yakushimaru from her debut album Kokinshū (古今集) (1984). Takeuchi recorded her own version for her album Request (1987) which was released as the album's fifth single in 1988.

The song later appeared on her greatest hits albums Love Collection (2000) and Hiroko Yakushimaru Golden Best (薬師丸ひろ子 ゴールデン☆ベスト) (2002).

== Mariya Takeuchi version ==
"Genki o Dashite"

Single by Mariya Takeuchi

from the album Request
- B-side: "Oh No, Oh Yes!"
- Released: November 28, 1988
- Genre: J-pop
- Length: 4:45
- Label: Moon Records
- Songwriter: Mariya Takeuchi
- Producer: Tatsuro Yamashita

Mariya Takeuchi singles chronology
"After Years/Eki" (1987)	"Genki o Dashite" (1988)	"Single Again" (1989)

Japanese singer-songwriter Mariya Takeuchi recorded her own version for her self-cover album, Request (1987). It was originally released as the B-side of her single Yume no Tsuzuki (夢の続き, Dream Sequel) in 1987. The song also features Hiroko Yakushimaru on background vocals, the same singer who first recorded the song three years earlier.

After being selected as the commercial song for watchmaker Seiko's Dolce & Exceline (ドルチェ&エクセリーヌ) range in 1988, the song was released as the album's fifth single. Its B-side, Oh No, Oh Yes!, also appearing on Request, is a cover of a song Takeuchi wrote for singer Akina Nakamori's album Crimson (1986).

While it did not charted well at the time of its release, the song has been recognized as one of Takeuchi's signature songs which is now frequently covered by other artists.

The song was rerecorded later in 2008, dubbed as "'08 New Remaster", for her 2008 single, Shiawase no Monosashi/Ureshukute Samishii Hi (Your Wedding Day) (幸せのものさし/うれしくてさみしい日(Your Wedding Day), Ruler of Happiness/Day of Happiness and Sadness (Your Wedding Day)). It is also featured on her compilation albums Impressions (1994) and Expressions (2008).

=== Track listing ===
No.	Title	Writer(s)	Arranger	Length
1.	"Genki o Dashite (元気を出して, Cheer Up)"	Mariya Takeuchi	Tatsuro Yamashita	4:45
2.	"Oh No, Oh Yes!"	Mariya Takeuchi	Tatsuro Yamashita	5:18

=== Chart Rankings ===
==== Oricon Charts (Japan) ====
Release	Chart	Peak position	First week sales	Sales total	Chart run
November 28, 1988	Oricon Daily Singles Chart				
November 28, 1988	Oricon Weekly Singles Chart	70	1,740	12,920	7 weeks
November 28, 1988	Oricon Yearly Singles Chart				

== Shimatani Hitomi version ==
"Genki o Dashite"

Single by Hitomi Shimatani

from the album Gate: Scena III
- B-side: "Tsuki no Inori"
- Released: June 4, 2003
- Genre: J-pop
- Length: 3:35
- Label: Avex Trax
- Songwriter: Mariya Takeuchi
- Producer: Ōno Hiroaki

Hitomi Shimatani singles chronology
"Akai Sabaku no Densetsu" (2003)	"Genki o Dashite" (2003)	"Perseus" (2003)

Hitomi Shimatani covered this song and released it as her 11th single on June 4, 2003. It was as a theme song for 7 of the 27 serial dramas in NHK's special NHK Yoru no Renzoku Dorama serial dramas, over a period of 6 and 1/2 months.

Shimatami performed the song at the 54th Kōhaku Uta Gassen annual New Year's Eve music variety show at the end of 2003.

The song appears on her third album Gate: Scena III as the Gate Version. This version is the version used for her 2003 greatest hits album, Delicious!: The Best of Hitomi Shimatani. The original version appears on her second greatest hits album, Best & Covers, released in 2009.

=== Track listing ===
No.	Title	Writer(s)	Arranger	Length
1.	"Genki o Dashite (元気を出して, Cheer Up)"	Mariya Takeuchi	Tatsuro Yamashita	3:35
2.	"Tsuki no Inori (ツキノイノリ, Moon Prayer)"	Mizue, Yasunari Kawabata	Keiji Tanabe	5:00
3.	"Genki o Dashite (Instrumental) (元気を出して, Cheer Up)"	Mariya Takeuchi	Tatsuro Yamashita	3:35
4.	"Tsuki no Inori (Instrumental) (ツキノイノリ, Moon Prayer)"	Mizue, Yasunari Kawabata	Keiji Tanabe	5:00

=== Chart Rankings ===
==== Oricon Charts (Japan) ====
Release	Chart	Peak position	First week sales	Sales total	Chart run
June 4, 2003	Oricon Daily Singles Chart				
June 4, 2003	Oricon Weekly Singles Chart	10	15,908	40,843	10 weeks
June 4, 2003	Oricon Yearly Singles Chart				

=== Various charts ===
Chart	Peak position
CDTV Top 100	11

== Other cover versions ==
- Rowena Cortes (1987, Cantonese, 手掌上的電話號碼, album 露雲娜'87, Hong Kong)
- Patrick Tam (1989, Cantonese, 泡沫裏的夢, album 為你解悶, Hong Kong)
- Jessica：Lín Yŭpíng (1991, Mandarin, 清醒之後(Pinyin: Qīngxĭng-Zhī Hòu), album Jiŭbié Chóngféng, Taiwan)
- Eric Martin (2003, Compilation album Sincerely...II〜Mariya Takeuchi Songbook〜)
- Cyndi Wang (2005, Mandarin, 打起精神來(Pinyin: Dăqĭ Jīngshén Lái), album Cyndi with U, Taiwan)
- Chara (2009, single Kataomoi B-side)
- Junichi Inagaki (2009, single Christmas Carol no Koro ni B-side)
- Hiromi Iwasaki (2006, album Dear Friends III)
- Juju (2008, single Yasashisa de Afureru You ni B-side)
- Shizuka Kudō (2002, album Shōwa no Kaidan Vol.1)
- Mana Kana (2009, album Futari no Uta 2)
- Mitsuki (2008, single Natsu no Montage B-side)
- Aoi Teshima (2008, album Niji no Kashū)
- Hideaki Tokunaga (2007, album Vocalist 3)
