= Uta Monogatari (album) =

Greatest hits album by Hiroko Yakushimaru
- Released: March 2, 2011
- Recorded: 1981–1991, 2010
- Genre: Pop
- Length: 127:31
- Language: Japanese
- Label: EMI Music Japan

Hiroko Yakushimaru chronology
Essential Best (2007)	Uta Monogatari (2011)

Uta Monogatari (歌物語) is the double retrospective CD of Japanese actress/singer Hiroko Yakushimaru. It was released by EMI Music Japan in March 2011 to celebrate her 30-year career as a recording artist, with 30 of the songs that Yakushimaru herself selected.

This collection mainly consists of the efforts from her EMI era when Yakushimaru had enjoyed successful recording career, and also includes the single version of her biggest hit "Sailor Suit and Machine Gun"—the original take of the song had rarely appeared on her previous compilations, because it was the sole material that she released via Kitty Records. Disc one is closed with a new song "Boku no Takaramono" which she recorded for the first time in 12 years. It was featured on a film Wasao starring her, and also released as a single.

None of the works released by BMG Funhouse during the late 1990s was featured on the album. The works collaborated with her former spouse Koji Tamaki were also completely disregarded, including top-ten hit single "Mune no Furiko" in 1987.

== Track listing ==
Disc 1: Songs & Stories
No.	Title	Lyrics	Music	Arranger	Length
1.	"Sailor-fuku to Kikanjū (セーラー服と機関銃, Yume no Tochū; 「夢の途中」)" (Single version)	Etsuko Kisugi	Takao Kisugi	Katz Hoshi	4:34
2.	"Tantei Monogatari (探偵物語)"	Takashi Matsumoto	Eiichi Ohtaki	Akira Inoue	3:56
3.	"Sukoshi Dake Yasashiku (すこしだけ やさしく)"	Takashi Matsumoto	Eiichi Ohtaki	Akira Inoue	4:41
4.	"Main Theme (メイン・テーマ)"	Takashi Matsumoto	Yoshitaka Minami	Masao Ōmura	3:26
5.	"Woman (W no Higeki Yori) (Woman "Wの悲劇"より)"	Takashi Matsumoto	Karuho Kureta	Masataka Matsutoya	3:53
6.	"Anata o Motto Shiritakute (あなたを・もっと・知りたくて)"	Takashi Matsumoto	Kyōhei Tsutsumi	Satoshi Takebe	3:53
7.	"Suteki na Koi no Wasurekata (ステキな恋の忘れ方)"	Yōsui Inoue	Yōsui Inoue	Satoshi Takebe	4:28
8.	"Sasayaki no Step (ささやきのステップ)"	Takashi Matsumoto	Ken Satō	Motoki Funayama	4:18
9.	"Hitomi de Hanashite (瞳で話して)"	Takashi Matsumoto	Tetsuya Tsujihata	Akira Inoue	4:01
10.	"Shinshi Dōmei (紳士同盟)"	Yōko Aki	Ryūdō Uzaki	Satoshi Takebe	3:59
11.	"Hard Day's Rag (ハードデイズ・ラグ)"	Yōko Aki	Shigeru Umebayashi	Satoshi Takebe	3:20
12.	"Jidai (時代)"	Miyuki Nakajima	Miyuki Nakajima	Motoki Funayama	3:52
13.	"Kataritsugu Ai ni (語りつぐ愛に)"	Etsuko Kisugi	Takao Kisugi	Satoshi Takebe	4:10
14.	"Kaze ni Notte (風に乗って)"	Chika Ueda	Chika Ueda	Nobuyuki Shimizu	4:20
15.	"Yūgure o Tomete (夕暮れを止めて)"	Miki Fūdō	Seishirō Kusunose	Nobuyuki Shimizu	5:01
16.	"Boku no Takaramono (僕の宝物)"	Chiharu Tamashiro	Shōgo Kaida	Akira Inoue	4:52
Total length:					66:52

Disc 2: Hearts & Stories
No.	Title	Lyrics	Music	Arranger	Length
1.	"Primavera"	Oroshi Momiji	Masao Ōmura	Masao Ōmura	4:34
2.	"A Lover's Concerto"	Tokiko Iwatani (Japanese lyrics), Denny Randell, Sandy Linzer	Denny Randell, Sandy Linzer	Satoshi Takebe	3:57
3.	"Akai Hana, Aoi Hana (赤い花、青い花)"	Takashi Matsumoto	Haruomi Hosono	Haruomi Hosono, Miharu Koshi, Yasuharu Konishi	4:22
4.	"Destiny"	Taeko Ōnuki	Ryūichi Sakamoto	Ryūichi Sakamoto, Shinobu Narita	4:22
5.	"Samishii Hito ni Naranaide (さみしい人にならないで)"	Eiko Kyo	Chika Ueda	Akira Inoue	4:48
6.	"Mikansei (未完成)"	Miyuki Nakajima	Miyuki Nakajima	Kazuo Shiina	5:12
7.	"Hyaku-tsubu no Namida (100粒の涙)"	Takashi Matsumoto	Kyōhei Tsutsumi	Satoshi Takebe	4:03
8.	"Bamboo Boat (バンブー・ボート)"	Minako Yoshida	Takao Kisugi	Kazuo Shiina	3:59
9.	"Utakata (うたかた)"	Minako Yoshida	Chika Ueda	Hiroki Inui	4:26
10.	"Ten ni Hoshi, Chi ni Hana (天に星、地に花)"	Takashi Matsumoto	Kyōhei Tsutsumi	Hiroshi Shinkawa	3:05
11.	"Ame wa Yamanai (雨は止まない)"	Amii Ozaki	Amii Ozaki	Akira Inoue	4:10
12.	"Ame ni Sarawarete (雨にさらわれて)"	Ryō Aska	Ryō Aska	Taisuke Sawachika	5:17
13.	"Genki o Dashite (元気を出して)"	Mariya Takeuchi	Mariya Takeuchi	Kazuo Shiina	3:59
14.	"Toki no Okurimono (時の贈り物)"	Minako Yoshida	Minako Yoshida	Minako Yoshida	4:27
Total length:					60:41

== Chart positions ==
Chart	Position
Japanese Oricon Weekly Albums Chart (top 300)	43
