= Friday Night Plans =

Japanese singer

- Born: January 1996 (age 30); Tokyo
- Genres: J-pop; electronic
- Occupation: Singer
- Years active: 2017–present
- Label: Miya Terrace
- Members: Masumi

Friday Night Plans is a musical act led by Japanese vocalist Masumi (born January 1996), who is the group's sole member. The act made its recording debut as a guest performer on StarRo and AmPm's 2017 single, "Maybe". Friday Night Plans debuted as a performing act the following year with its 2018 cover of Mariya Takeuchi's 1984 song "Plastic Love", which entered the Japanese Oricon at number 30. It is also known for its 2019 song "Honda", which was used in Japanese advertising for Honda Vezel vehicles.

== Biography ==
Masumi was born in Tokyo to a Japanese father and Filipina mother. She spent most of her childhood in Tokyo, only visiting the Philippines once every few years. Masumi wanted to become a singer after listening to her mother singing Mariah Carey and Whitney Houston songs, and became interested in Western music in junior high school, especially after watching MTV Japan every day and becoming a fan of Justin Bieber. Masumi began attending a vocal training school in high school.

Masumi was discovered on Instagram by Japanese singer Taichi Mukai around June 2017, who liked her cover song performances she had posted. This led to Masumi being scouted to sing on a collaborative song between producer StarRo and electronic duo AmPm entitled "Maybe", which was released in November 2017. Without having a stage name before the song's release, Masumi decided to go with Friday Night Plans, reminding herself of the feeling of excitement in her childhood making plans with friends (and wanting the name to evoke excitement in listeners).

Masumi met Tepppei in March 2018 after a suggestion by her record label director, and in July 2018 Friday Night Plans released their first single, "Happy Birthday", produced by Tepppei. The pair worked together for much of 2018 and 2019, including on the project's cover of Mariya Takeuchi's "Plastic Love" (2018), which became one of the project's most popular songs, and the Complex EP released in November 2019, which was entirely produced by Tepppei. Outside of this, Friday Night Plans released Location: Los Angeles in August 2018, a collection of demos not produced by Tepppei, which were recorded by Masumi during a trip to Los Angeles in June.

In 2019, Friday Night Plans released the song "Honda", a song used in commercials for Honda Vezel, which became the act's first single to chart on the Billboard Japan Hot 100 chart. This, along with her follow-up single "Unknown" were produced by Dr. Pay.

== Artistry ==
Friday Night Plans' music has a wide range of influences, including Justin Bieber, Nigerian-Canadian musician Odie, and Korean R&B singer-songwriter Dean.

== Discography ==
=== Extended plays ===
Title	Details	Peak chart positions
Title	Details	JPN Oricon
Location: Los Angeles	Released: August 31, 2018; Label: Miya Terrace, Kissing Fish Records; Formats: Digital download, streaming, 12" record	146
Complex	Released: November 15, 2019; Label: Miya Terrace; Formats: digital download, streaming	—
"—" denotes items that did not chart.

=== Singles ===
==== As lead artist ====
List of singles, with selected chart positions
Title	Year	Peak chart positions		Album
Title	Year	JPN Oricon	JPN Hot	Album
"Happy Birthday"	2018	—	—	Non-album singles
"UU"	2018	—	—	Non-album singles
"Dig In!"	2018	—	—	Non-album singles
"I'm Out"	2018	—	—	Non-album singles
"Plastic Love"	2018	30	— (Note: "Plastic Love" did not enter the Billboard Japan Hot 100 chart, but peaked at number 40 on the Billboard Japan Top Single Sales physical chart.)	Non-album singles
"Just One Wish"	2018	—	—	Non-album singles
"Prism" (Friday Night Plans, JJJ, Stuts)	2019	—	—	Non-album singles
"All the Dots"	2019	—	—	Complex
"Decoy"	2019	—	—	Complex
"Honda"	2019	43	71	Non-album singles
"Unknown"	2020	43	— (Note: "Unknown" did not enter the Billboard Japan Hot 100 chart, but peaked at number 63 on the Billboard Japan Top Single Sales physical chart as a part of the "Honda" / "Unknown" single.)	Non-album singles
"Kiss of Life"	2020	—	—	Non-album singles
"—" denotes items that did not chart.

==== As featured artist ====
Title	Year	Album
"Maybe" (StarRo & AmPm featuring Friday Night Plans)	2017	Non-album singles
"Ain't Nothing" (TaeyoungBoy featuring Friday Night Plans)	2018	Non-album singles
"See You Later" (Chocoholic featuring Friday Night Plans)	2019	Rewrite
"Down for Whatever" (Kilder featuring Friday Night Plans)	2020	Don’t Hide

=== Guest appearances ===
List of non-single guest appearances with other performing artists
Title	Year	Other artist(s)	Album
"White"	2019	TaeyoungBoy	Howl of Youngtimz
"Last Peace"	2019	Mukai Taichi	27
"Trepanation"	2021	Millennium Parade	THE MILLENNIUM PARADE
