= Kenka wo Yamete =

Single by Naoko Kawai

from the album Album
- Language: Japanese
- B-side: "Tasogare Blue"
- Released: September 1, 1982
- Genre: J-pop; Kayōkyoku; sentimental ballad
- Length: 4:29
- Label: Nippon Columbia
- Composer: Mariya Takeuchi
- Lyricist: Mariya Takeuchi

Naoko Kawai singles chronology
"Natsu no Heroine" (1982)	"Kenka wo Yamete" (1982)	"Invitation" (1982)

"Kenka wo Yamete" (Japanese: けんかをやめて; lit. 'Stop Fighting') is a song by Japanese singer Naoko Kawai, which would be later inserted into her 1983 album Album. Written by Mariya Takeuchi, it is her 10th single since her debut in 1980.

While being on a hiatus from singing at that time, and also just being married to Tatsuro Yamashita, Takeuchi saw Kawai singing "Smile for Me'' (スマイル・フォー・ミー, Sumairu・fō・mī), her fifth single at that time, on television and thought that "she would surely suit a more mellow song" and that "Kenka wo Yamete" (lit. 'Stop fighting') would become one of Kawai's song someday. In the end, she received an offer by Nippon Columbia, Kawai's label, to write a song for her, and proposed this one.

Inspired by the Mary MacGregor song, "Torn Between Two Lovers", which involves a love triangle with a woman weighing the odds between two boyfriends, Takeuchi's work was influenced by Western pop music she listened when she was a child.

When released originally in 1982, it peaked at #5 on the Oricon singles chart for 14 weeks, and sold 215,000 copies. It ranked overall at the 64th place on Oricon's 1982 year-end chart.

It resurged after an appearance in the 2022 anime film Suzume.

== Track listing ==
7-inch vinyl

No.	Title	Lyrics	Music	Arranger	Length
1.	"Kenka wo Yamete" ((けんかをやめて; "Stop Fighting"))	Mariya Takeuchi	Takeuchi	Nobuyuki Shimizu	4:29
2.	"Tasogare Blue" (Tasogare Burū (黄昏ブルー; "Twilight Blue"))	Machiko Ryu	Koji Makaino	Kei Wakakusa	4:26

== Charts ==
Chart (1982)	Peak position
Japanese Oricon Singles Chart	5

== Awards ==
- Gold Award at the 24th Japan Record Awards.

== Cover versions ==
Kenka wo Yamete

- Takeuchi self-covered the song for her 7th original studio album, "REQUEST" (1987).

== See also ==
- 1982 in Japanese music
