= Rodel Naval =

Filipino singer and actor (1953–1995)

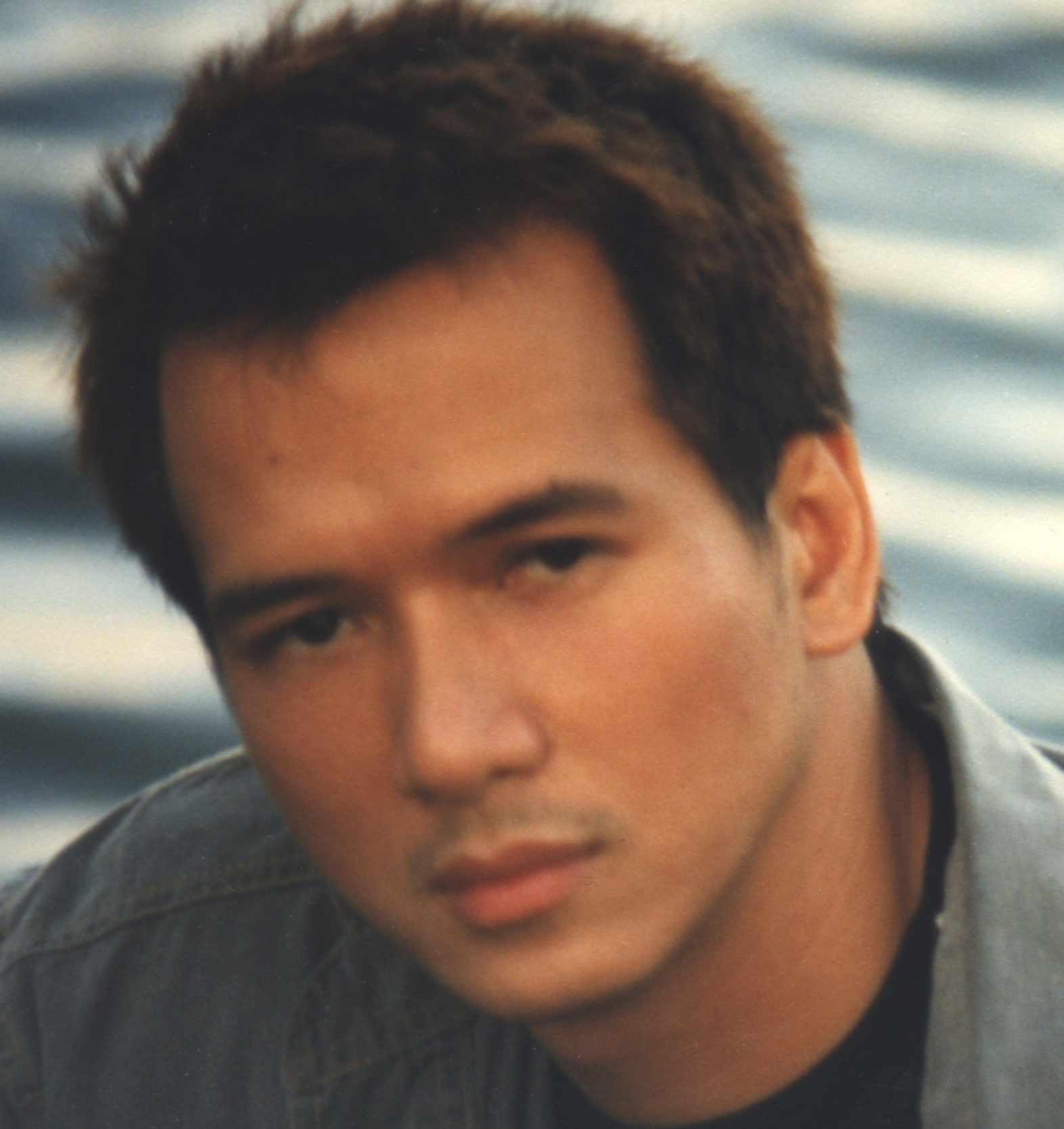

Background information
- Born: February 16, 1953; Manila, Philippines
- Died: June 11, 1995 (aged 42) Toronto, Ontario, Canada
- Genres: Pop
- Occupations: Actor, singer, songwriter
- Years active: 1975–1995
- Labels: Independent; ex-distributors: Ivory, Alpha

Rodel Belvis Naval (February 16, 1953 – June 11, 1995) was a Filipino actor, singer, and songwriter. He is best remembered for such songs as "Lumayo Ka Man Sa Akin" and "Muli".

== Background ==
Rodel (or Ody as he was called by those who knew him) was born in Manila, Philippines on February 16, 1953. He was the fifth of seven siblings. The siblings had a special sense of closeness to each other although they were never really into demonstrative displays. They would go on family outings and visit their many different relatives. Family outings on weekends and holidays were numerous. They often took trips to the Beaches and their favorite beaches were those in Bataan, their father's hometown.

The family had very strong musical inclinations. They were artists at heart. More often than not, playing piano piece, or guitar chords filled the air in their home. As children, their mother was insistent that they had piano lessons. Rodel began his lessons when he was seven years old. Although Rodel loved music, he would get very impatient with all the theory and the discipline required in learning to play the piano. He felt he did not need them because he had the gift of learning a musical piece through ouido or "playing by ear." He was the last child in a family of seven to emigrate to Canada in 1980.

In Canada, he performed at the Grandstand of the Canadian National Exhibition (CNE), commonly known as The Ex. It is open in August each year, closing on Canadian Labour Day. After a year in Canada, Naval moved to Los Angeles, California, performing at such venues as the Wilshire Ebell Theatre, the Scottish Rite Temple, and the Ambassador Hotel. He also performed at Imperial Palace in Las Vegas.

In 1989, Naval returned to the Philippines and released a cassette album titled Finally I Found Love. In early December, his mother died and he immediately flew to Canada. After a month he went to Japan to perform. While having lunch in a restaurant, he heard the song "Single Again" and he fell in love with this song. He got the urge to write the lyrics based on the melody of "Single Again". Due to loneliness because of his mother's recent death, he was able to write the lyrics in 15 minutes.

After a brief stint in Japan, he returned to the Philippines in 1990 ready to produce the album that was to become his magnum opus. The single "Lumayo Ka Man" (in English - "Even If You Go Away"), released on Ivory Records, is a Tagalog adaptation of the 1989 song "Single Again", originally by Japanese singer Mariya Takeuchi. "Lumayo Ka Man" soared triple platinum within two months. In late 1992, he released the album titled Once Again with songs performed both in English and Tagalog.

In 1993, Naval became ill and returned to Canada for medical diagnosis. While there, he joined the musical production, Miss Saigon, performing the role of assistant commissar. He became increasingly ill but continued to perform musically, giving two concerts in April 1994, one in Toronto and the other in Los Angeles.

== Death and legacy ==
On June 11, 1995, Naval died in Toronto, Canada, at the age of 42. It was initially reported that he had suffered from pneumocystis pneumonia. His family confirmed a year later on a Filipino television show hosted by Inday Badiday that his death was the result of complications related to AIDS.

Naval was interred at Pine Hills Cemetery, Scarborough, Toronto. In an interview before his death, he spoke about his struggle with AIDS, "Maybe there is a purpose to all of this, and if I can help others because of what happened to me, let it be so."

In 1997, Rodel Naval Care Outreach (RoNaCo) was founded by two of Naval's sisters – Delia and Rosalie – to help the poverty-stricken areas of Manila affected by HIV.

== Singles ==
- "Lumayo Ka Man" (cover of the Japanese song "Single Again" by Mariya Takeuchi; also covered by Bugoy Drilon, Liezl Garcia and Cesar Montano)
- "Muli" (covered by Bugoy Drilon, Janno Gibbs, Angeline Quinto and others)
