= Single Again =

Single Again may refer to:

- "Single Again" (Mariya Takeuchi song), a 1989 song by Mariya Takeuchi
- "Single Again" (Trina song), a 2007 song by Trina
- "Single Again" (Big Sean song), a 2019 song by Big Sean
- "Single Again" (Josh Ross song), a 2024 song by Josh Ross
- "Single Again", a 2019 song by Scott H. Biram
