= Variety (Mariya Takeuchi album) =

1984 studio album by Mariya Takeuchi

Studio album by Mariya Takeuchi
- Released: 25 April 1984
- Recorded: July 1983–January 1984
- Genre: J-pop
- Length: 42:14
- Language: Japanese, English
- Label: Moon Records
- Producer: Tatsuro Yamashita

Mariya Takeuchi chronology
| Viva Mariya! (1982) | Variety (1984) | Request (1987) |

Singles from Variety
- 1. "Mou Ichido" Released: April 10, 1984; 2. "Mersey Beat de Utawasete" Released: August 25, 1984; 3. "Plastic Love" Released: March 25, 1985

Variety is the sixth studio album by Japanese singer-songwriter Mariya Takeuchi. It was released on 25 April 1984 through Moon Records. Variety is considered as Takeuchi's "comeback" album after being on hiatus since 1981, and is the first album entirely written by her. The album is produced by Takeuchi's husband, Tatsuro Yamashita.

To international audiences, Variety is known for containing "Plastic Love" which, although only seeing moderate success in Japan when it was released as a single in 1985, saw a resurgence in popularity internationally in 2017 after a remix was uploaded to YouTube.

== Production and release ==
Takeuchi's five albums released before Variety were mostly written by other songwriters which, although they featured industry stars such as Haruomi Hosono and members of Toto, left her feeling "exhausted". She went on hiatus at the end of 1981 due to a sore throat, as well as to marry Yamashita in 1982.

During her break, Yamashita left his record label, RCA Records, for the newly-founded Moon Records. Meanwhile, Takeuchi began writing some of the songs which would be included in Variety. Yamashita originally planned for Takeuchi's comeback album to be written by other songwriters, but changed his mind after listening to some of Takeuchi's work. A promotional single, "Mou Ichido", was released on 10 April 1984, followed by a full release on 25 April. The album topped the Oricon Albums Chart.

A 30th Anniversary edition of the album was released on 19 November 2014. The version included a previously unreleased track, "Aka no Enamel" (赤のエナメル), both club remixes from the single release of "Plastic Love", and karaoke versions of four tracks.

The 30th Anniversary edition of the album became available on music streaming services like Apple Music and Spotify on 3 November 2021, the same date when the 2021 vinyl reissue was released.

== Track listing ==
All tracks are written by Mariya Takeuchi.

| No. | Title | Arrangement | Length |
|---|---|---|---|
| 1. | "Mou Ichido" (もう一度) | Tatsuro Yamashita | 4:06 |
| 2. | "Plastic Love" (プラスティック・ラブ) | Tatsuro Yamashita | 4:51 |
| 3. | "Honki de Only You (Let's Get Married)" (本気でオンリーユー) | Tatsuro Yamashita | 3:53 |
| 4. | "One Night Stand" | Tatsuro Yamashita; Nobutaka Tsugei (background vocal arrange) | 3:57 |
| 5. | "Broken Heart" | Tatsuro Yamashita | 3:55 |
| 6. | "Night at the Amphitheater" (アンフィシアターの夜) | Tatsuro Yamashita; Kazuo Shiina (horn arrange) | 3:33 |
| 7. | "Todokanu Omoi" (とどかぬ想い) | Tatsuro Yamashita | 3:34 |
| 8. | "Mersey Beat de Utawasete" (マージービートで唄わせて) | Tatsuro Yamashita | 3:19 |
| 9. | "Mizu to Anata to Taiyō to" (水とあなたと太陽と) | Tatsuro Yamashita | 3:29 |
| 10. | "Going Steady" (ふたりはステディ) | Tatsuro Yamashita | 3:27 |
| 11. | "Shetland ni Hoho wo Uzumete" (シェットランドに頬をうずめて) | Tatsuro Yamashita; Hiroki Inui (strings arrange) | 3:42 |
| Total length: | | | 42:14 |

30th Anniversary Edition bonus tracks
| No. | Title | Length |
|---|---|---|
| 12. | "Aka no Enameru [Previously Unreleased]" (赤のエナメル) | 2:55 |
| 13. | "Plastic Love [12” Extended Club Mix]" | 9:18 |
| 14. | "Plastic Love [12” Original Length Remix]" | 4:55 |
| 15. | "Plastic Love [Karaoke]" | 4:56 |
| 16. | "Honki de Only You (Let's Get Married) [Karaoke]" (本気でオンリーユー) | 3:59 |
| 17. | "Night at the Amphitheater [Previously Unreleased Karaoke]" (アンフィシアターの夜) | 3:38 |
| 18. | "Mersey Beat de Utawasete [Previously Unreleased Karaoke]" (マージービートで唄わせて) | 3:21 |
| Total length: | | 75:16 |

== Personnel ==
Mou Ichido (もう一度)

- Tatsuro Yamashita - Acoustic Guitar, Electric Guitar, Electric Piano, Emulator, Percussion, Backing Vocals
- Koki Ito - Bass
- Jun Aoyama - Drums
- Hiroyuki Namba - Acoustic Piano

Plastic Love (プラスティック・ラブ)

- Mariya Takeuchi, Taeko Onuki - Backing Vocals
- Tatsuro Yamashita - Electric Guitar, Acoustic Piano, Synthesizer, Percussion, Emulator, Backing Vocals
- Koki Ito - Bass
- Jun Aoyama - Drums
- Yasuhara Nakanashi - Electric Piano
- Joe Katoh Group - Strings
- Ernie Watts, Takeru Muraoka - Tenor Saxophone
- Tadanori Konakawa, Yoshio Oikawa - Trombone
- Hitoshi Yokoyama, Susumu "Shin" Kazuhara - Trumpet
- Syunzo Sunahara - Baritone Saxophone

Honki De Only You (Let's Get Married) (本気でオンリーユー)

- Tatsuro Yamashita - Acoustic Piano, Electric Sitar, Vibraphone, Drums, Percussion, Backing Vocals, Other (Bowwow!)
- Koki Ito - Bass
- Joe Katoh Group - Strings
- Ryuichi Sakamoto - Synthesizer (Pipe Organ)
- Ernie Watts - Tenor Saxophone

One Night Stand

- Mariya Takeuchi - Acoustic Piano
- Tatsuro Yamashita - Electric Guitar
- Chuei Yoshikawa - Acoustic Guitar
- Tokuo Nakano, Yutaka Hosoi - Backing Vocals
- Koki Ito - Bass
- Akihiro Noguchi - Drums, Backing Vocals
- Nobutaka Tsugei - Pedal Steel Guitar, Backing Vocals

Broken Heart

- Tatsuro Yamashita - Electric Guitar, Synthesizer, Percussion
- Jim Haas, John Joyce, Stan Farber - Backing Vocals
- Koki Ito - Bass
- Jun Aoyama - Drums
- Tsunehide Matsuki - Electric Guitar
- Hiroshi Sato - Acoustic Piano, Electric Piano
- Masami Nakagawa - Flute
- Keiko Yamakawa - Harp
- Motoya Hamaguchi - Percussion
- Ernie Watts, Takeru Muraoka - Tenor Saxophone
- Tadanori Konakawa, Yoshio Oikawa - Trombone
- Hitoshi Yokoyama, Susumu "Shin" Kazuhara - Trumpet
- Syunzo Sunahara - Baritone Saxophone

Night At The Amphitheater (アンフィシアターの夜)

- Tatsuro Yamashita - Electric Guitar, Hammond Organ, Backing Vocals
- Jim Haas, John Joyce, Kazuhito Murata, Kazuo Shiina, Stan Farber - Backing Vocals
- Koki Ito - Bass
- Jun Aoyama - Drums
- Yoshihiro Matsuuma - Electric Guitar
- Motoya Hamaguchi - Percussion
- Yasuhara Nakanishi - Acoustic Piano
- Shigeo Fuchino - Tenor Saxophone
- Tadanori Konakawa, Shigeharu Mukai - Trombone
- Toshio Araki, Susumu "Shin" Kazuhara - Trumpet
- Syunzo Sunahara - Baritone Saxophone

Todokanu Omoi (とどかぬ想い)

- Tatsuro Yamashita - Acoustic Guitar, Electric Guitar, Acoustic Piano, Electric Piano, Hammond Organ, Percussion
- Jim Haas, John Joyce, Stan Farber - Backing Vocals
- Koki Ito - Bass
- Jun Aoyama - Drums
- Chuck Findley - Flugelhorn
- Motoya Hamaguchi - Percussion

Mersey Beat De Utawasete (マージービートで唄わせて)

- Mariya Takeuchi - Organ Solo
- Tatsuro Yamashita - Acoustic Guitar, Electric Guitar, 12-String Electric Guitar, Percussion
- Ginji Ito, Kazuhito Murata, Masamichi Sugi - Backing Vocals
- Koki Ito - Bass
- Yutaka Uehara - Drums
- Hiroyuki Namba - Organ

Mizu To Anata To Taiyo To (水とあなたと太陽と)

- Tatsuro Yamashita - Vibraphone
- Koki Ito - Bass
- Yutaka Uehara - Drums
- Masami Nakagawa - Flute
- Motoya Hamaguchi - Percussion
- Hiroyuki Namba - Acoustic Piano
- Unknown (possibly Tatsuro Yamashita or Chuei Yoshikawa) - Acoustic Guitar

Going Steady (ふたりはステディ)

- Tatsuro Yamashita - Acoustic Piano, Electric Piano, Acoustic Guitar, Electric Guitar, Hammond Organ, Synthesizer, Harpsichord, Percussion, Backing Vocals
- Koki Ito - Bass
- Jun Aoyama - Drums
- Motoya Hamaguchi - Percussion
- Ryuichi Sakamoto - Synthesizer
- Hiroshi Yaginuma - Alto Saxophone
- Shigeo Fuchino, Takeru Muraoka - Tenor Saxophone
- Ernie Watts - Tenor Saxophone Solo
- Syunzo Sunahara - Baritone Saxophone

Shetland Ni Hoho O Uzumete (シェットランドに頬をうずめて)

- Tatsuro Yamashita - Electric Guitar, Synthesizer
- Chuei Yoshikawa - Acoustic Guitar
- Koki Ito - Bass
- Jun Aoyama - Drums
- Keiko Yamakawa - Harp
- Motoya Hamaguchi - Percussion
- Yasuhara Nakanishi - Acoustic Piano, Electric Piano
- Ohno Group - Strings
- Shigeharu Mukai - Trombone

== Charts ==
=== Weekly charts ===
| Year | Album | Chart | Position | Sales |
|---|---|---|---|---|
| 1984 | Variety | Oricon Weekly LP Albums Chart | 1 | 316,000 |
| 1984 | Variety | Oricon Weekly CT Albums Chart | 2 | 167,000 |
| 2014 | Variety "30th Anniversary Edition" | Oricon Weekly Albums Chart | 13 | — |
| 2021 | Variety "2021 Vinyl Edition" | Oricon Weekly Albums Chart | 6 | — |

=== Year-end charts ===
| Year | Album | Chart | Position | Sales |
|---|---|---|---|---|
| 1984 | Variety | Oricon Yearly Albums Chart | 11 | 481,000 |

== See also ==
- 1984 in Japanese music
