= List of Oricon number-one singles of 1985 =

The highest-selling singles in Japan are ranked in the Oricon Singles Chart, which in 1985 was published in what was then called Oricon Weekly magazine. The data are compiled by Oricon based on each singles' physical sales. This list includes the singles that reached the number one place on that chart in 1985.

== Oricon Weekly Singles Chart ==
Issue date	Song	Artist(s)	Ref.
January 7	"The Stardust Memory"	Kyōko Koizumi	
January 14	"The Stardust Memory"	Kyōko Koizumi	
January 21	"You Gotta Chance: Dance de Natsu wo Dakishimete"	Kōji Kikkawa	
January 28	"You Gotta Chance: Dance de Natsu wo Dakishimete"	Kōji Kikkawa	
February 4	"You Gotta Chance: Dance de Natsu wo Dakishimete"	Kōji Kikkawa	
February 11	"Tenshi no Wink"	Seiko Matsuda	
February 18	"Tenshi no Wink"	Seiko Matsuda	
February 25	"Yoisho!" (ヨイショッ!)	Masahiko Kondō	
March 4	"Cinderella wa Nemurenai"	The Alfee	
March 11	"Sotsugyō: Graduation"	Momoko Kikuchi	
March 18	"Mi Amore (Meu amor é...)"	Akina Nakamori	
March 25	"Mi Amore (Meu amor é...)"	Akina Nakamori	
April 1	"Ano Ko to Scandal"	The Checkers	
April 8	"Ano Ko to Scandal"	The Checkers	
April 15	"Ano Ko to Scandal"	The Checkers	
April 22	"Tokonatsu Musume"	Kyōko Koizumi	
April 29	"Tokonatsu Musume"	Kyōko Koizumi	
May 6	"Nikumare Sōna New Face"	Kōji Kikkawa	
May 13	"Akaitori Nigeta"	Akina Nakamori	
May 20	"Boy no Kisetsu"	Seiko Matsuda	
May 27	"Boy no Theme"	Momoko Kikuchi	
June 3	"Boy no Theme"	Momoko Kikuchi	
June 10	"Ima Dakara"	Yumi Matsutoya, Kazumasa Oda, Kazuo Zaitsu	
June 17	"Ima Dakara"	Yumi Matsutoya, Kazumasa Oda, Kazuo Zaitsu	
June 24	"Debut / Manhattan Joke"	Naoko Kawai	
July 1	"Sand Beige (Sabaku e)"	Akina Nakamori	
July 8	"Dancing Shoes"	Seiko Matsuda	
July 15	"Ore-tachi no Rockabilly Night"	The Checkers	
July 22	"Ore-tachi no Rockabilly Night"	The Checkers	
July 29	"Ore-tachi no Rockabilly Night"	The Checkers	
August 5	"Majo"	Kyōko Koizumi	
August 12	"Kanashimi ni Sayonara"	Anzen Chitai	
August 19	"Kanashimi ni Sayonara"	Anzen Chitai	
August 26	"Kareinaru Kake"	Toshihiko Tahara	
September 2	"Kanashimi ni Sayonara"	Anzen Chitai	
September 9	"Kanashimi ni Sayonara"	Anzen Chitai	
September 16	"Namida no Jasmine Love"	Sonoko Kawai	
September 23	"Namida no Jasmine Love"	Sonoko Kawai	
September 30	"Heart of Rainbow: Ai no Niji wo Watatte / Blue Pacific"	The Checkers	
October 7	"Mō Aenai Kamo Shirenai"	Momoko Kikuchi	
October 14	"Mō Aenai Kamo Shirenai"	Momoko Kikuchi	
October 21	"Solitude"	Akina Nakamori	
October 28	"Koi ni Ochite: Fall in Love"	Akiko Kobayashi	
November 4	"Koi ni Ochite: Fall in Love"	Akiko Kobayashi	
November 11	"Kami-sama Help!"	The Checkers	
November 18	"Koi ni Ochite: Fall in Love"	Akiko Kobayashi	
November 25	"Koi ni Ochite: Fall in Love"	Akiko Kobayashi	
December 2	"Nantettatte Idol"	Kyōko Koizumi	
December 9	"Koi ni Ochite: Fall in Love"	Akiko Kobayashi	
December 16	"Koi ni Ochite: Fall in Love"	Akiko Kobayashi	
December 23	"Kamen Butōkai"	Shonentai	
December 30	"Koi ni Ochite: Fall in Love"	Akiko Kobayashi	

== See also ==
- 1985 in Japanese music
