= Plastic Love =

1984 song by Mariya Takeuchi

- 2021 reissue single artwork, originally used for 1980 "Sweetest Music" single

Single by Mariya Takeuchi

from the album Variety
- Language: Japanese, English
- Released: March 25, 1985
- Recorded: 1984
- Studio: Onkio Haus (Tokyo, Japan)
- Genre: City pop
- Length: 4:53
- Label: Moon
- Songwriter: Mariya Takeuchi
- Producer: Tatsuro Yamashita

Mariya Takeuchi singles chronology
"Mersey Beat de Utawasete" (1984)	"Plastic Love" (1985)	"Koi no Arashi" (1986)

Alternative cover
- Original 1985 single cover

Music video
- "Plastic Love" on YouTube

"Plastic Love" (Japanese: プラスティック・ラブ, Hepburn: Purasutikku Rabu) is a song by the Japanese singer Mariya Takeuchi from her 1984 album Variety. Written by Takeuchi and arranged by Tatsuro Yamashita, it was released as the album's third single on March 25, 1985. "Plastic Love" is a city pop song; its upbeat arrangement contrasts with melancholic lyrics that describe a woman who embraces a hollow, hedonistic lifestyle after being scorned by a lover.

Upon its initial release, the single reached number 86 on the Oricon Singles Chart and sold around 10,000 copies. In the late 2010s, an eight-minute remix of "Plastic Love" went viral after being frequently recommended by the YouTube algorithm. By 2019, it had received over 22 million views, and it received over 55 million views by 2021 before being removed due to a copyright strike. A reissue of Takeuchi's original single on 12 inch vinyl peaked at number five on the Oricon Singles Chart in 2021, and became the best–selling analog single of 2022 in Japan; Warner Music Japan also released a music video for the song.

The popularity of "Plastic Love" has led to an international resurgence of interest in city pop, and is regarded as the best-known song in the genre alongside Miki Matsubara's 1979 single "Mayonaka no Door (Stay with Me)". It has been covered and remixed numerous times, including the Japanese idol group Juice Juice, whose version reached number three on the Oricon Singles Sales chart in 2021 and number 85 on Oricon's 2022 year–end Singles Chart.

== Recording ==
"Plastic Love" was recorded for Takeuchi's sixth studio album, Variety (1984), a "comeback" record for Takeuchi. Unlike on previous albums, where she generally performed songs written by others, all of the songs on Variety were written by Takeuchi. Because she was pregnant while she recorded the album, Takeuchi was unable to experience the "excess" of pre bubble-era Japan. During this period, she wrote songs "because it was fun". In an interview with The Japan Times, Takeuchi explained her songwriting process as wanting to write songs of different genres, like rock, folk, and country music. For "Plastic Love", she "wanted to write something danceable, something with a city pop sound. I wanted to write something that had 16 beats and lyrics capturing what life in a city was like".

"Plastic Love" was recorded and mixed at Onkio Haus in Ginza, Tokyo. It was written by Takeuchi and arranged by Tatsuro Yamashita; Yamashita also produced the song and performed backing vocals. Yamashita mixed the song with Yasuo Sato.

== Composition ==
Plastic Love
A sample of the chorus of "Plastic Love". The song has been described as the "best-known example of city pop" by Collin Marshall of Open Culture.

"Plastic Love" is a city pop song, and has been described as the "best-known example" of the genre. City pop as a genre is associated with the strong Japanese economy of the 1970s and 1980s, being musically tied to the "cosmopolitan lifestyle" and blending numerous genres of western popular music together. According to New York Times writer David Leonhardt, the genre "often pairs shimmery vocals with funky production", resulting in an "effervescent sound". Miranda Remington of Pen Magazine International described the song as being "arguably [Takeuchi's] most euphoric number". The song pairs a "funk bassline and flamboyant brass" with "soaring vocals".

In contrast to the song's upbeat arrangement, the song's lyrics are melancholic. Most of the song's lyrics are in Japanese, although portions of the chorus ("Don't worry" and "I'm sorry") as well as the closing refrain ("I’m just playing games/I know it’s plastic love/Dance to the plastic beat/Another morning comes") are in English. "Plastic Love" depicts a woman who has been scorned by a lover and becomes convinced that true love does not exist. Instead, she treats love as a game. According to Takeuchi, the song's character "lost the man she truly loves" and "couldn’t shake the feelings of loneliness that the loss created." Ryan Bassil of Vice described the song as "ode to a specific breed of loneliness: of being broken yet surrounded, lost to the night in fancy shoes and dresses; seeking out love beneath glowing lights while tip-toeing around the fear of commitment".

== Reception ==
"Plastic Love" was originally released as a 12-inch vinyl single on March 25, 1985. The release featured an "Extended Club Mix" as well as a new remix of the song. The single met with only moderate success in Japan, peaking at number 86 on the Oricon Singles Chart. It sold less than 10,000 copies, although it performed respectably in karaoke distribution.

On November 3, 2021, "Plastic Love" was re-released as a single on 12–inch vinyl to commemorate "Record Day", a day to encourage people to purchase analog records. The release included the "Extended Club Mix" featured on the 1985 single as well as the original version of the song. It debuted at number five on the Oricon Singles Chart for the week of November 15, selling a total of 14,000 copies in its first week exclusively on analog. Simultaneously, a reissue of Variety charted at number six on the Oricon Albums Chart, also exclusively based on analog sales. According to Oricon, this was an unusually strong performance; it is rare for singles to chart in the top ten purely off of analog sales, despite the increase of popularity of vinyl records. The single spent 28 weeks on the chart in total. According to SoundScan Japan, "Plastic Love" was the best-selling analog single of 2021 in Japan. SoundScan credited the song with popularizing city pop overseas.

== Legacy ==
=== Fan remix ===
In 2017, an eight-minute version was uploaded by the YouTube account Plastic Lover. The video did not feature an official remix of the song, but rather a fan-made version of the original that loops several parts of the song to extend its length. The origin of the remix is unclear; according to Plastic Lover, the video was a re-upload of an existing video that had been taken down.

Between 2017 and 2019, the video was picked up by the YouTube recommendation algorithm and went viral, acquiring over 22 million views. The song became "near-inescapable" on YouTube, where it frequently appeared in the "recommended" feed. It was briefly removed due to a copyright strike from Alan Levenson, the photographer responsible for the video's thumbnail; the photograph was originally used for Takeuchi's 1980 single "Sweetest Music", not "Plastic Love", and was used without permission. According to Plastic Lover, Levenson was barraged by hateful messages, some of which were antisemitic, and was initially "unwilling to negotiate". He ultimately agreed to lift the copyright strike once he was credited as photographer. By February 2021, the video had over 55 million views on YouTube. The video was eventually removed from YouTube due to a separate copyright claim.

Thomas Calkins of Vassar College's Musical Urbanism noted the strong connection fans had to the specific upload by Plastic Lover, and outrage at its removal, as a social phenomenon; "users could’ve moved on to any number of clones of the video, or the myriad remixes and copies. For some listeners, that digital copy had specific meanings that others did not... What the Plastic Love phenomenon suggests is that through this threat of loss, even digital copies can have a kind of aura for music listeners". Levenson's "Sweetest Music" photograph has become strongly associated with "Plastic Love" due to the remix video; the 2021 re-issue of the single used the Levenson photograph. Kotaku writer Brian Ashcroft attributed the song's renewed success to a "combination of the now iconic photo, the instantly catchy vibes, and the earworm appeal of Takeuchi’s performance".

=== City pop resurgence ===
The belated popularity of "Plastic Love" has been cited as a key factor in city pop's increasing popularity among western audiences. Writing for Billboard Japan in April 2022, Hitoshi Kurimoto described "Plastic Love", as well as Miki Matsubara's "Mayonaka no Door (Stay with Me)", as "representative tracks that have become resurgent hits" in the city pop genre. Kurimoto noted a common pattern among city pop songs, including "Plastic Love", of being first discovered by the underground club music community – specifically the vaporwave and future funk sub–genres – before acquiring wider popularity due to uploads to YouTube and social media platforms like TikTok. Ryutaro Amano of Mikiki felt the song had become synonymous with future funk. The "breakout popularity" of city pop led record labels in Japan to re–issue albums as well as to issue new features and music videos, with sales in the genre "flourishing" on both CD and vinyl formats.

Because "Plastic Love" was not officially available on streaming platforms until November 2020, it has been described as an "invisible hit song". In October 2018, Colin Marshall of Open Culture described the song as having become the "best-known example of city pop". In February 2021, Cat Zhang of Pitchfork said that "nearly every young city pop fan I’ve talked to has cited “Plastic Love” as their gateway to the genre, and the YouTube algorithm as their route". NME writer Tanu Raj noted the song, along with "Stay with Me" and Takako Mamiya's "Midnight Joke", functioned a "gateway for a younger generation to discover [city pop]". According to Miranda Remington of Pen Magazine International, "mashups with famous Western songs; fan-made English-language lyrics; and most prevalently, retro-futuristic ‘vaporwave’ takes" have circulated "ubiquitously" online. She felt "Plastic Love" and its fan-made remixes had become an "important site of virtual commentary, as urban love stories for those who yearn for an idealised past from the present".

Takeuchi has expressed surprise at the song's popularity among foreign listeners. In an interview with The Japan Times, she said that "it never occurred to me to try to (release) work in the West... Considering that it was mostly performed in Japanese, we figured it would be impossible to go abroad", and was curious about how the city pop "movement" began. Shoumik Hassin of Bdnews24 felt the song connected with audiences because of its "melancholy" vibe, pairing the "shiny, plastic surfaces" of city pop with "hints of confusion, yearning, and loneliness"; "even in a language you might not know, and amid the bouncy beat and the bright brass, it feels like taking a smoking break and getting slightly too honest." In Heichi Magazine, Joni Zhu noted the appearance of "Plastic Love" as expressing "a yearning for an eternal 1980s, and a Japanified future when Japanese trademarks would dominate the world". The popularity of "Plastic Love" in the 2020s is an example of Showa retro.

=== Copyright dispute ===
In 2018, K-pop singer Yubin released a teaser for "City Love", the first single from an upcoming album titled City Woman. Listeners claimed the song was similar to "Plastic Love". On June 8, 2018, Yubin's label, JYP Entertainment, announced the song would be pulled from the album due to "copyright controversies" and that the album's release would be postponed. In an interview with The Japan Times, Korean producer Night Tempo said JYP Entertainment had brought him in to try and produce a song similar to "Plastic Love", and alleged the label had based "City Love" off of his own remix of "Plastic Love".

== Music video ==
On May 18, 2019, Warner Music Japan released a short music video for "Plastic Love", covering the first 1:49 of the song. The video was directed by Kyoutaro Hayashi and does not feature Takeuchi. Hayashi described the goal for the video as combining the modern era with the era that "Plastic Love" was created in. Vice writer Lex Celera described the video, which depicts a woman and a man briefly crossing paths and a glance in a hotel, as capturing "the exact mood the song projects: a gentle shifting between loneliness and adventure, coupled with a sense of nostalgia and a loss for something you’ve never had".

A full version of the video was released on Takeuchi's Souvenir the Movie – Mariya Takeuchi Theater Live video album in November 2020. The full video was released on YouTube on November 11, 2021. Starring Japanese actors Sawa Nimura and Shuhei Uesugi.

== Other versions ==
"Plastic Love" has been covered by a number of artists. Hong Kong singer Anita Mui covered the song in 1987 on her album Flaming Red Lips (Chinese: 烈焰紅唇; Jyutping: lit6 jim6 hung4 seon4), under the title Seeking Love (Chinese: 尋愛; Jyutping: cam4 oi3). Taiwanese indie pop musician 9m88 covered the song in 2018. A cover of "Plastic Love" by eill was used as the theme song for the 2021 Japanese film Sensei, Would You Sit Beside Me?.

In 2018, Friday Night Plans released a cover of "Plastic Love". It spent three weeks on the Oricon Singles Chart, peaking at number 30, and number 40 on the Billboard Japan Top 100 Top Single Sales chart. In December 2021, Japanese idol group Juice=Juice released a cover of "Plastic Love" as a triple-a side single with "Familia" and "Future Smile". The single spent eight weeks on the Oricon Singles Chart, peaking at number three, and number eight on the Billboard Japan Hot 100. It ranked at number 85 on the 2022 year-end Oricon Singles Chart.

At the "Bunnies Camp 2024 Tokyo Dome" fan meeting held at the Tokyo Dome on June 26 and 27, 2024, NewJeans member Hyein covered the song.

== Track listing ==
12" single (1985)

1. "Plastic Love" (Extended Club Mix) – 9:15
2. "Plastic Love" (New re–mix) – 4:51

12" single (2021)

1. "Plastic Love" (Extended Club Mix) – 9:15
2. "Plastic Love" (Original Version) – 4:53

== Credits and personnel ==
Credits are adapted from the liner notes of the 1985 release.

Musicians

- Electric guitar, acoustic piano, synthesizer, percussion, emulator, background vocals: Tatsuro Yamashita
- Electric piano: Yasuharu Nakanishi
- Background vocals: Mariya Takeuchi, Taeko Ohnuki
- Bass: Koki Ito
- Drums: Jun Aoyama
- Trumpet: Shin Kazuhara, Hitoshi Yokoyama
- Trombone: Tadanori Konakawa, Yoshio Oikawa
- Tenor sax: Takeru Muraoka
- Baritone sax: Syunzo Sunahara
- Strings: Joe Katoh Group
- Tenor sax (solo): Ernie Watts

Production

- Produced by Tatsuro Yamashita for Smile Company
- Words and music by Mariya Takeuchi
- Arranged and edited by Tatsuro Yamashita
- Associate producer: Nobumasa Uchida
- Recording engineer: Yasuo Satoh
- Mixed by Tatsuro Yamashita, Yasuo Satoh
- Second engineer: Shigeru Takise
- Recorded and mixed at Onkio Haus
- Disk mastering engineer: Mitsuru "Teppei" Kasai
- Mastering studio: CBS/Sony Shinanomachi Studio
- Masterrights owned by Smile Company
- Executive producer: Ryuzo "Junior" Kosugi
- Art director: Kenichi Hanada

== Charts ==
=== Mariya Takeuchi ===
1985 weekly chart performance
Chart (1985)	Peak position
Japan (Oricon)	86

2021 weekly chart performance
Chart (2021)	Peak position
Japan (Oricon)	5
Japan (Japan Hot 100)	82
Japan Top Singles Sales (Billboard Japan)	5

=== Friday Night Plans ===
2018 weekly chart performance
Chart (2018)	Peak position
Japan (Oricon)	30
Japan Top Singles Sales (Billboard Japan)	40

=== Juice=Juice ===
2021 weekly chart performance
Chart (2021)	Peak position
Japan (Oricon)	3
Japan (Japan Hot 100)	5

2022 year-end chart performance for
Chart (2022)	Peak position
Japan (Oricon)	85

== See also ==
- 1985 in Japanese music
- "Mayonaka no Door", a city pop song that saw a resurgence in 2020
- Shōwa nostalgia
