= StarRo =

starRo
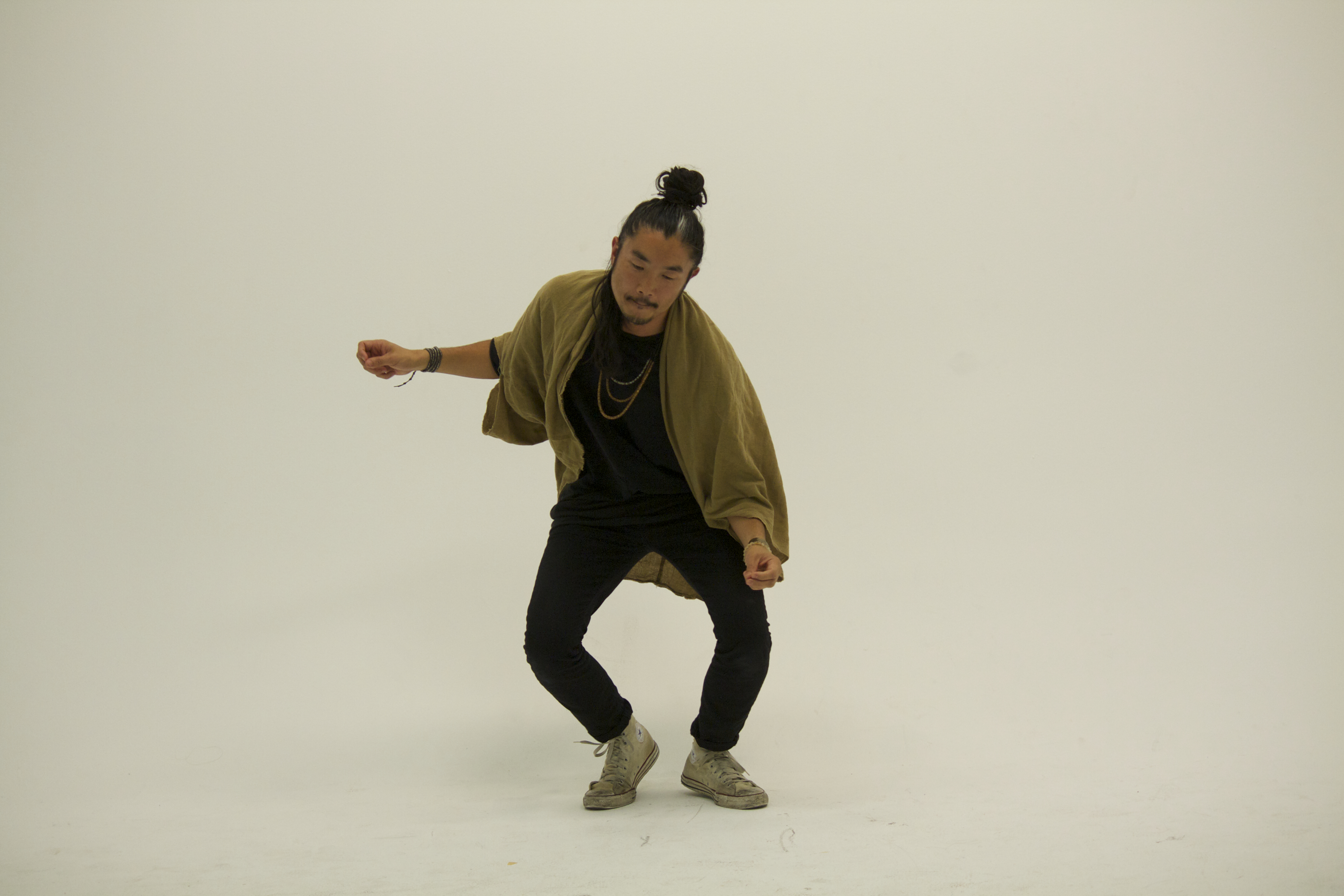

Background information
- Born: Shinya Mizoguchi; Japan
- Origin: Los Angeles, California, United States
- Genres: Hip hop; R&B; electronic
- Occupation: Record producer

starRo is the moniker of Grammy nominated R&B producer Shinya Mizoguchi. His debut album Monday was released world wide October 20, 2016 and subsequently rose to the top of the charts in Japan. In 2016 he became the first Grammy nominated producer from Japan rising him to fame in his country of origin. Uproxx later wrote, "starRo may well be one of the first, true SoundCloud producers to be nominated for a Grammy." The LA-based, Japanese-born producer also became the first to host a Beats1 Radio show focused on Tokyo culture. Since then, he produced for a number of Japanese and Korean R&B/Hip Hop stars including the Korean group Common Cold (Mad Clown and Justhis) called "WASH!WASH!" which went to number 3 in Korea and received critical acclaim in Korea.

== Awards and nominations ==
Year	Nominee / work	Award	Result
2016	Heavy Star Movin' by The Silver Lake Chorus	Grammy Award for Best Remixed Recording, Non-Classical	Nominated

== Discography ==
=== Albums ===
- Monday (2016)

=== EP ===
- Komorebi (2011)
- Soulection White Label: 004 (2013)
- Emotion (2015)

=== Singles ===
- "Touching the Void" (2013)
- "Waiting" (2014)
- "California" (2014)
- "House Party" (2015)
- "I Will" (2015)
- "Relapse" (2016)
- "Milk" (2016)
- "Yams" (2016)

=== Remixes ===
Title	Year	Artist
"Temple" (starRo remix)	2014	Sunni Colon
"The One" (starRo remix)	2015	JMSN
"Heavy Star Movin'" (starRo remix)	2016	The Silver Lake Chorus
"Hear You Now" (starRo remix)	2018	Taali
