= Naoko Kawai =

Japanese pop singer

Naoko Kawai 河合奈保子
- Born: Nahoko Kawai 河合奈保子; July 24, 1963 (age 63); Sumiyoshi, Osaka, Japan
- Genres: J-pop
- Occupations: Singer, songwriter, composer
- Instruments: Vocals, keyboards, guitar, mandolin
- Years active: 1980–1996
- Label: Nippon Columbia
- Spouse: Takayasu Kanehara (m. 1996)

Naoko Kawai (河合奈保子) (born 24 July 1963) is a Japanese former pop idol, singer-songwriter, and composer who was active in the 1980s. Kawai was from the same generation as Seiko Matsuda, Yoshimi Iwasaki, Junko Mihara and Yoshie Kashiwabara, who all debuted in 1980. After her marriage in 1996, she changed her maiden surname to Naoko Kanehara (金原奈保子) and completely suspended music activities. Since then, Kawai has resided in Australia.

== Early life ==
Naoko was born in Sumiyoshi-ku in Osaka. She is the eldest daughter of her family and has a sister who is three years younger. In elementary school, she started to play the piano, and in high school was part of the folk-song club as part of her after-school activities. In 1979, Naoko applied to compete in the "Hideki Younger Brother/Sister Recruitment Audition" contest held by talent agency Geiei, named after the singer Hideki Saijo. In the audition application tape, she sang Anri's 'Olivia wo Kikinagara'. She won the final tournament held at Nakano Sunplaza with a performance of Mako Ishino's 'Haru La! La! La!'.

== Career ==
=== 1980-1984 ===
In June 1980, she debuted with the single "Ooki na Mori no Chiisana Ouchi" under Nippon Columbia. Her nickname during the debut was "the little Hideki's sister". Two months later in August 1980, her second single "Young Boy" became one of her first career hits. The single not only debuted at number 13 on the Oricon Weekly charts and remained in Yearly Charts at number 80, but also won multiple awards: New Artist Award at the 22nd Japan Record Awards, Judge's Encouragement Award at the 7th ABC Kayo Shinnin Grand Prix, Newcomer Award at the 7th Yokohama Music Festival, Excellent Newcomer Award at the 8th FNS Music Festival and 6th Zen Nihon Kayō ongakusai, Enthusiastic Performance Award at the 10th Ginza Music Festival, and Silver Award at the Shinjuku Music Festival. In October 1980, she released her first original album Love, which included 2 singles with its b-side tracks and 6 newly written songs. The album debuted at number 7 on the Oricon Weekly charts. In December, she released her third single, "Aishitemasu". The single debuted at number 14 on the Oricon Weekly chart and stayed at number 83 in the 1981 yearly Oricon Charts. In the same month, her first live album Live was released, which includes recordings from her first concert held in October at Mielparque Tokyo.

In January 1981, Naoko launched a concert tour, the "1981 Shin Haru Tour", which lasted the whole month. In March 1981, she released her fourth single 17-sai ("Seventeen"). The single debuted at number 11 on the Oricon Weekly charts and stayed at number 75 in the 1981 yearly Oricon Charts. The same month, she launched her second concert tour, the "1981 Spring Tour", which ran until May. In May 1981, she released her second album Twilight Dream, fully arranged by Motoki Funayama. It includes 2 previously released singles with its b-side tracks and 6 newly written tracks. The album debuted at number 2 on the Oricon Weekly charts. Her fifth single, "Smile For Me", was released in June 1981, and became one of the most recognizable songs of her career. The single debuted at number 4 and stayed at number 59 in the 1981 yearly Oricon Charts. She received the Golden Dove Award at the 7th Nippon Television Music Festival and the Golden Idol prize at the 23rd Japan Record Awards. In July 1981, she launched her third concert tour "Kawai Naoko: Natsu" which ran until August. In August 1981, she released her third original album, Diary, which debuted at number 3 on the Oricon Weekly Charts. Soon after finishing the summer tour, Naoko launched her fourth "Kawai Naoko Concert" in September, which lasted the whole month. During the same month, she released her sixth single, "Moonlight Kiss", which debuted at number 11 on the Oricon Weekly charts and remained at number 95 on the 1981 yearly charts. It received a Golden Award at the 7th Zen Nihon Kayō ongakusai. In November 1981, the recording label released her first compilation album Angel, which debuted at number 6 on the Oricon Weekly charts. In December 1981, she released her seventh single "Love Letter," which debuted at number 11 on the Oricon Weekly Charts and remained at number 61 on the 1982 yearly charts. In the same month, she made an appearance on the new-year television program Kōhaku Uta Gassen for the first time.

=== 1985-1990 ===
One of her representative singles is 'Half Moon Serenade'.

Her 1985 single 'Debut/Manhattan Joke' reached first place in the Oricon Weekly Singles Chart.

In 1987, Kawai took part in the pop-music contest "Intertalent 87" held in Prague, Czechoslovakia and won the "Prize of the Deputy Prime Minister 87" Supraphon Award and prize for 3rd place in the contest. The special single "Looking For Love" bundled Izayoi Monogatari has been released in the country under recording label Suprahon. "Looking For Love" was composed by Czech composer Karel Svoboda.

She also notably appeared on two Jackie Chan songs in his 1988 studio album, 'Jackie Chan'.

== Personal life ==
In 1996, she married hair and makeup artist Takayasu Kanehara after a 100-day courtship. She has an only-child her daughter Kaho, who debuted in 2013 as a singer, however soon after suspended activities in order to focus on school.

== Discography ==
=== Albums ===
List of albums, with selected chart positions
Title	Album details	Peak positions
Title	Album details	JPN Oricon
Love	Released: October 10, 1980; Label: Nippon Columbia; Formats: CD, LP, Cassette tape, digital download, streaming	7
Twilight Dream	Released: May 10, 1981; Label: Nippon Columbia; Formats: CD, LP, Cassette tape, digital download, streaming	2
Diary	Released: August 10, 1981; Label: Nippon Columbia; Formats: CD, LP, Cassette tape, digital download, streaming	3
Summer Heroine	Released: July 21, 1982; Label: Nippon Columbia; Formats: CD, LP, Cassette tape, digital download, streaming	6
Album	Released: January 21, 1983; Label: Nippon Columbia; Formats: CD, LP, Cassette tape, digital download, streaming	1
Sky Park	Released: June 1, 1983; Label: Nippon Columbia; Formats: CD, LP, Cassette tape, digital download, streaming	2
Half Shadow	Released: October 2, 1983; Label: Nippon Columbia; Formats: CD, LP, Cassette tape, digital download, streaming	4
Summer Delicacy	Released: June 1, 1984; Label: Nippon Columbia; Formats: CD, LP, Cassette tape, digital download, streaming	6
Daydream Coast	Released: August 28, 1984; Label: Nippon Columbia; Formats: CD, LP, Cassette tape, digital download, streaming	3
Sayonara Monogatari: THE LAST SCENE and AFTER	Released: December 5, 1984; Label: Nippon Columbia; Formats: CD, LP, Cassette tape, digital download, streaming	11
Stardust Garden	Released: March 5, 1985; Label: Nippon Columbia; Formats: CD, LP, Cassette tape, digital download, streaming	4
9 1/2 Half	Released: December 12, 1985; Label: Nippon Columbia; Formats: CD, LP, Cassette tape, digital download, streaming	10
Scarlet	Released: October 21, 1986; Label: Nippon Columbia; Formats: CD, LP, Cassette tape, digital download, streaming	4
JAPAN as waterscapes	Released: June 24, 1987; Label: Nippon Columbia; Formats: CD, LP, Cassette tape, digital download, streaming	7
Members Only	Released: April 1, 1988; Label: Nippon Columbia; Formats: CD, LP, Cassette tape, digital download, streaming	15
Calling You	Released: November 21, 1989; Label: Nippon Columbia; Formats: CD, Cassette tape, digital download, streaming	66
Bookend	Released: June 1, 1990; Label: Nippon Columbia; Formats: CD, Cassette tape, digital download, streaming	71
Engagement	Released: November 21, 1993; Label: Nippon Columbia; Formats: CD, digital download, streaming	-
nahoko Oto: blue/orange (released as Nahoko)	Released: April 26, 2006; Label: TBA; Formats: digital download	-
nahoko Oto (released as Nahoko)	Released: November 2, 2006; Label: TBA; Formats: digital download	-
"—" denotes items which did not chart

=== Eps ===
List of EPs, with selected chart positions
Title	Album details	Peak positions
Title	Album details	JPN Oricon
Beautiful Day	Released: July 24, 1983; Label: Nippon Columbia; Formats: CD, LP, Cassette tape, digital download, streaming	7
Bara Ado	Released: September 21, 1987; Label: Nippon Columbia; Formats: CD, LP, Cassette tape, digital download, streaming	42
Timeless: Naoko special mix	Released: October 10, 1987; Label: Nippon Columbia; Formats: CD, LP, Cassette tape, digital download, streaming	39
Fabric Voices	Released: September 21, 1987; Label: Nippon Columbia; Formats: CD, LP, Cassette tape, digital download, streaming	56

=== Live albums ===
List of live albums, with selected chart positions
Title	Album details	Peak positions
Title	Album details	JPN Oricon
LIVE	Released: December 10, 1980; Label: Nippon Columbia; Formats: CD, LP, Cassette tape	10
Naoko in concert	Released: February 25, 1982; Label: Nippon Columbia; Formats: CD, LP, Cassette tape	9
Brilliant	Released: November 21, 1982; Label: Nippon Columbia; Formats: CD, LP, Cassette tape	12
NAOKO THANKSGIVING PARTY	Released: October 21, 1988; Label: Nippon Columbia; Formats: CD, LP, Cassette tape	47
"—" denotes items which did not chart

=== Compilation albums ===
List of compilation albums, with selected chart positions
Title	Album details	Peak positions
Title	Album details	JPN Oricon
Angel	Released: November 25, 1981; Label: Nippon Columbia; Formats: CD, LP, Cassette tape	5
Kawai Naoko Zenkyokushuu	Released: September 21, 1982; Label: Nippon Columbia; Formats: CD, LP, Cassette tape	25
Prism (Angel II)/Collection	Released: December 21, 1983; Label: Nippon Columbia; Formats: CD, LP, Cassette tape	7
Ai Naoko no Wakakusairo no Tabi	Released: March 21, 1984; Label: Nippon Columbia; Formats: CD, LP, Cassette tape	7
Naoko22/Collection II	Released: July 24, 1985; Label: Nippon Columbia; Formats: CD, LP, Cassette tape	7
Zenkyokushuu Namida no Hollywood	Released: May 21, 1986; Label: Nippon Columbia; Formats: CD, LP, Cassette tape	37
Pure Gold	Released: March 21, 1989; Label: Nippon Columbia; Formats: CD, LP, Cassette tape	99
Kawai Naoko Sakuhinshuu Masterpieces	Released: May 1, 1989; Label: Nippon Columbia; Formats: CD, LP, Cassette tape	88
NAOKO KAWAI Super Twin DX	Released: December 1, 1990; Label: Nippon Columbia; Formats: CD, Cassette tape	-
Kawai Naoko Best Selection I/Kawai Naoko Best Selection II	Released: September 21, 1993; Label: Nippon Columbia; Formats: CD	-
Kawai Naoko Single Collection	Released: December 6, 2006; Label: Nippon Columbia; Formats: CD	-
Kawai Naoko Golden Best	Released: March 3, 2010; Label: Nippon Columbia; Formats: CD	-
Kawai Naoko Golden Best A-side/B-side collection	Released: January 23, 2013; Label: Nippon Columbia; Formats: CD	-
Golden Idol Naoko Kawai	Released: July 30, 2014; Label: Nippon Columbia; Formats: CD	-
Watashi ga Sukina Naoko Kawai	Released: August 26, 2015; Label: Nippon Columbia; Formats: CD, digital download, streaming	-
Masaaki Omura Works: Masaaki Omura Sakushin Shuu	Released: September 21, 2022; Label: Nippon Columbia; Formats: CD, digital download, streaming	-
Kawai Naoko COLLECTION Vol.1 1980-1984/COLLECTION Vol.2 1985-1993	Released: December 3, 2022; Label: Nippon Columbia; Formats: LP	-
Masao Urino Works: Masao Urino Sakushin Shuu	Released: July 12, 2023; Label: Nippon Columbia; Formats: CD, digital download, streaming	-
"—" denotes items which did not chart

=== Box set ===
List of compilation albums, with selected chart positions
Title	Album details	Peak positions
Title	Album details	JPN Oricon
Jewel Box	Released: September 29, 2001; Label: Nippon Columbia; Formats: CD+DVD set	-
Jewel Box 2	Released: February 1, 2003; Label: Nippon Columbia; Formats: CD+DVD set	286
NAOKO PREMIUM	Released: December 19, 2007; Label: Nippon Columbia; Formats: CD+DVD set	250
NAOKO LIVE PREMIUM	Released: February 18, 2009; Label: Nippon Columbia; Formats: CD+DVD set	189
"—" denotes items which did not chart

=== Singles ===
List of singles, with selected chart positions
Year	Single	Peak chart positions	Formats
Year	Single	JPN Physical	Formats
1980	"Ooki na Mori no Chiisana Ouchi" （大きな森の小さなお家）	36	CD, LP, Cassette
1980	"Young Boy" （ヤング・ボーイ）	13	CD, LP, Cassette
1980	"Aishitemasu" （愛してます）	14	CD, LP, Cassette
1981	"17-sai" （17才）	11	CD, LP, Cassette
1981	"Smile for me " （スマイル・フォー・ミー）	4	CD, LP, Cassette
1981	"Moonlight Kiss" （ムーンライト・キッス）	11	CD, LP, Cassette
1981	"Love Letter" (ラブレター)	11	CD, LP, Cassette
1982	"Ai wo Kudasai" (愛をください)	7	CD, LP, Cassette
1982	"Natsu no Heroine" （夏のヒロイン）	7	CD, LP, Cassette
1982	"Kenka wo Yamete" （けんかをやめて）	5	CD, LP, Cassette
1982	"Invitation" （インビテーション）	8	CD, LP, Cassette
1983	"Straw Touch no Koi" （ストロー・タッチの恋）	9	CD, LP, Cassette
1983	"Escalation" （エスカレーション）	3	CD, LP, Cassette
1983	"Unbalance" （UNバランス）	4	CD, LP, Cassette
1983	"Gimonfu" （疑問符）	4	CD, LP, Cassette
1984	"Soyokaze no Melody" （微風のメロディー）	7	CD, LP, Cassette
1984	"Control" （コントロール）	7	CD, LP, Cassette
1984	"Kuchibiru no Privacy" （唇のプライバシー）	4	CD, LP, Cassette
1984	"Kita Eki no Solitude" （北駅のソリチュード）	6	CD, LP, Cassette
1985	"Jealous Train" （ジェラス・トレイン）	6	CD, LP, Cassette
1985	"Debut/Manhattan Joke" （デビュー／マンハッタン・ジョーク）	1	CD, LP, Cassette
1985	"Lavender Lips" （ラヴェンダー・リップス）	5	CD, LP, Cassette
1985	"Through The Window" （月に降る雪）	7	CD, LP, Cassette
1986	"Namida no Hollywood" （涙のハリウッド）	7	CD, LP, Cassette
1986	"Setsuna no Natsu" （刹那の夏）	10	CD, LP, Cassette
1986	"Halfmoon Serenade" （ハーフムーン・セレナーデ）	6	CD, LP, Cassette
1987	"Omoide no Coney's Island" （想い出のコニーズ・アイランド）	-	CD, LP, Cassette
1987	"Izayoi Monogatari" （十六夜物語）	10	CD, LP, Cassette
1988	"Kanashii Hito" （悲しい人）	21	CD, LP, Cassette
1988	"Harbour Light Memories" （ハーバー・ライト・メモリズ）	18	CD, LP, Cassette
1989	"Kanashimi no Anniversar" （悲しみのアニバァサリー）	74	CD, Cassette
1990	"Mi Rai" （美・来）	74	CD, Cassette
1990	"Nemuru, Nemuru, Nemuri" （眠る・眠る・眠る）	97	CD, Cassette
1994	"Yume no Ato Kara" （夢の跡から）	60	CD

=== Home-video ===
List of compilation albums, with selected chart positions
Title	Album details	Peak positions
Title	Album details	JPN Oricon
Brilliant: Lady Naoko in Concert	Released: November 21, 1982; Label: Nippon Columbia; Formats: VHS, LD, DVD	-
Beautiful Days in Gōkan	Released: September 1, 1983; Label: Nippon Columbia; Formats: VHS, LD, DVD	-
Kawai Naoko Ai no Concert	Released: December 1, 1983; Label: Nippon Columbia; Formats: VHS, LD, DVD	-
Daydream Coast	Released: August 28, 1984; Label: Nippon Columbia; Formats: VHS, LD	-
SUMMER SPECIAL in EAST'84	Released: December 1, 1984; Label: Nippon Columbia; Formats: VHS, LD, DVD	-
STARDUST GARDEN	Released: March 21, 1985; Label: Nippon Columbia; Formats: VHS, LD	-
Kanden suruzo Atsui Natsu NAOKO EAST'85	Released: September 21, 1985; Label: Nippon Columbia; Formats: VHS, LD, DVD	-
Fantastic Journey 91/2	Released: December 12, 1985; Label: Nippon Columbia; Formats: VHS, LD	-
NAOKO '86 Stardust Paradise in EAST	Released: September 1, 1986; Label: Nippon Columbia; Formats: VHS, LD, DVD	-
Scarlet	Released: December 10, 1986; Label: Nippon Columbia; Formats: VHS, LD	-
Earth Arc Geiei Festival Budokan ga Moeta	Released: January 25, 1987; Label: Nippon Columbia; Formats: VHS, LD	-
Tsukiyo Kyūden My Song For You	Released: September 10, 1987; Label: Nippon Columbia; Formats: VHS, LD, DVD	-
NAOKO THANKSGIVING PARTY	Released: November 21, 1989; Label: Nippon Columbia; Formats: LD, DVD	-
THE LOVER in ME: ALONE AGAIN	Released: February 21, 1990; Label: Nippon Columbia; Formats: VHS	-
Pure Moments: NAOKO KAWAI DVD COLLECTION	Released: March 30, 2002; Label: Nippon Columbia; Formats: VHS	-
Kawai Naoko Live Best: Kenka wo Yamete	Released: August 31, 2016; Label: Nippon Columbia; Formats: VHS	17
Kawai Naoko Premium Collection: NHK Kōhaku Uta Gassen and Let's Go Young etc.	Released: August 30, 2017; Label: Nippon Columbia; Formats: VHS	13
NAOKO ETERNAL SONGS	Released: December 23, 2020; Label: Nippon Columbia; Formats: VHS	-
"—" denotes items which did not chart

== Books ==
- [1981.01.15] Hessatsu Kindai Eiga Kawai Naoko Tokushuugou (別冊近代映画 河合奈保子特集号)
- [1981.03.01] Yume 17sai Ai Kokoro wo Komete Naoko Yori (夢・17歳・愛 心をこめて奈保子より)
- [1981.06.26] Soyokaze no Message (そよ風のメッセージ)
- [1981.08.05] KAWAI Naoko Photo Message (KAWAI奈保子フォトメッセージ)
- [1981.10.15] Tokimeki no Message (ときめきのメッセージ)
- [1982.03.27] Hohoemi Step (ほほえみステップ)
- [1982.07.01] Hessatsu Kindai Eiga Kawai Naoko PART 3 (別冊近代映画 河合奈保子スペシャルPART3)
- [1982.08.01] Summer Heroine (さまーひろいん)
- [1982.12.20] Idol Byakka 3 Kawai Sonoko (アイドル百科3 河合奈保子)
- [1983.02.23] Cherry Pink no Petit Heart (チェリーピンクのプチハート)
- [1983.04.05] NAOKO IN BANGKOK Kawai Naoko Shashinshuu PART 4 (NAOKO IN BANGKOK 河合奈保子写真集PART4)
- [1983.05.20] Wataboushi Tonda Naoko no Toubyou Sketch (わたぼうし翔んだ 奈保子の闘病スケッチ)
- [1983.10.20] Suteki na Jikan (素敵な時間)
- [1984.01.20] Last Prelude (らすと・ぷれりゅうど)
- [1984.04.15] NAOKO IN AUSTRALIA Kawai Naoko Shashinshuu PART 5 (NAOKO IN AUSTRALIA 河合奈保子写真集PART5)
- [1984.06.10] Otona no Shibatsueki Sugisaru Ai wo Kotoba ni (大人の始発駅 過ぎ去る愛を言葉に)
- [1984.10.25] NAOKO 5TH ANNIVERSARY
- [1985.07.06] LOVELY SUMMER
- [1985.07.15] Naoko Kawai Naoko Shashinshuu PART 6 (奈保子 河合奈保子写真集PART6)
- [1986.01.15] NAOKO TRANS AMERICA Kawai Naoko Sashinshuu PART 7 (NAOKO TRANS AMERICA 河合奈保子写真集PART)
- [1986.03.25] Sunshine Venus
- [1986.06.25] Kawai Naoko Shashinshuu (河合奈保子写真集)
- [1986.12.25] Bessatsu Scola (36) Kawai Sonoko Shashinshuu Scarlet (別冊スコラ（36）河合奈保子写真集 スカーレット)
- [1987.12.25] Treffen
