= Mizue =

- Gender: Female

Origin
- Origin: Japanese
- Meaning: Different meanings depending on the kanji used

Mizue (written: 瑞枝 or みづえ in hiragana) is a feminine Japanese given name. Notable people with the name include:

- Mizue Hoshi (星 瑞枝; born 1985), Japanese alpine skier
- Mizue Sawano (born 1941), Japanese artist
- Mizue Takada (高田 みづえ; born 1960), Japanese singer and idol

== Fictional characters ==
- Mizue Sakimoto (崎本 水枝), character in the video game series La Corda d'Oro
- Mizue Shisui (酒々井 水絵), character in the anime series Psycho-Pass

== See also ==
- Mizue Station, a railway station in Edogawa, Tokyo, Japan
