= Single Again (Mariya Takeuchi song) =

1989 song by Mariya Takeuchi

Single by Mariya Takeuchi

from the album Quiet Life
- Language: Japanese
- B-side: "Hey! Baby"
- Released: September 12, 1989
- Genre: J-pop; kayōkyoku
- Length: 4:26
- Label: Moon
- Songwriter: Mariya Takeuchi
- Producer: Tatsuro Yamashita

Mariya Takeuchi singles chronology
"Genki wo Dashite" (1988)	"Single Again" (1989)	"Kokuhaku" (1990)

Music video
- "Single Again" on YouTube

"Single Again" (Japanese: シングル・アゲイン, Hepburn: Shinguru Agein) is a song by Japanese singer-songwriter Mariya Takeuchi from her eighth studio album Quiet Life (1992). Her 18th single overall, it was released on September 12, 1989 as the first single from the album through Moon Records. Takeuchi wrote the song and produced by her husband Tatsuro Yamashita.

== Background ==
"Single Again" was used as the eighth opening theme of NTV's Kayō Suspense Gekijō (火曜サスペンス劇場, Kayō Sasupensu Gekijō; Tuesday Suspense Theater). The song is about a woman's feelings when she hears rumors of a divorced man marrying another woman, thus making her feel "single again".

== Chart performance ==
"Single Again" peaked at No. 2 on Oricon's weekly singles chart. It was certified platinum by the RIAJ in May 1992.

== Track listing ==
All tracks are written by Mariya Takeuchi.

7" vinyl / 8 cm CD single
No.	Title	Arrangement	Length
1.	"Single Again" (Shinguru Agein (シングル・アゲイン))	Tatsuro Yamashita; Katsuhisa Hattori (strings)	4:26
2.	"Hey! Baby"	Yamashita	3:50
Total length:			8:16

== Charts ==
Chart (1989)	Peak position
Japan (Oricon Singles Chart)	2

== Certification ==
Region	Certification	Certified units/sales
Japan (RIAJ)	Platinum	400,000^{^}
^{^} Shipments figures based on certification alone.

== Cover versions ==
- Kaori Kozai covered the song on her 1990 compilation album Koibune: Best Hits.
- Sammi Cheng covered the song in Cantonese as "Líbié" (離別, "Parting") on her 1990 album Sammi.
- Rodel Naval covered the song in Tagalog as "Lumayo Ka Man" ("Even If You Go Away") in 1990.
- Grasshopper covered the song in Cantonese as "Yuánliàng wǒ shì wǒ" (原諒我是我, "Forgive Me for Being Myself") on their 1993 album Shìjiè huì biàn dé hěn měi (世界會變得很美, The World Will Become Beautiful). They also recorded the song in Mandarin as "Wùhuì" (誤會, "Misunderstanding") on their 1994 album Ànliàn de dàijià (暗戀的代價, The Price of Secret Love).
- Akina Nakamori covered the song on her 2002 covers album Zero Album: Utahime 2.
- Phoebe Snow covered the song in English on the 2002 tribute album Sincerely: Mariya Takeuchi Songbook.
- Hideaki Tokunaga covered the song on his 2006 covers album Vocalist 2.
- Yasushi Nakanishi covered the song on his 2007 covers album Standards.
- Yūji Nakada covered the song on his 2014 covers album Song Composite.
- Juju covered the song on her 2014 covers album Request II.
