= Mariya Takeuchi =

Japanese singer and songwriter (born 1955)

Mariya Takeuchi 竹内 まりや
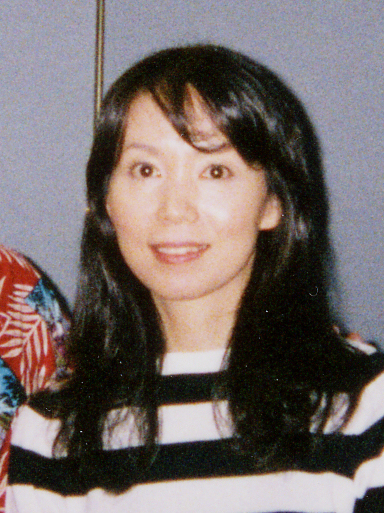

Background information
- Also known as: Miyabi, MAKO (as a lyricist)
- Born: Takeuchi Mariya; 20 March 1955 (age 71); Kizukiminami, Taisha-machi, Hikawa-gun (Current: Izumo-shi), Shimane Prefecture, Japan
- Genres: J-pop; Kayōkyoku; city pop; funk; soul; disco
- Occupations: Singer-songwriter, record producer
- Years active: 1978–present
- Labels: RCA (1978–1982); Alfa Moon (1984–1987); Moon / MMG (1987–1993); Moon / East/West Japan (1994–1997); Moon / Warner Music Japan (1998–present)
- Spouse: Tatsuro Yamashita (m. 1982)
- Children: 1
- Website: mariyat.co.jp

Mariya Takeuchi (竹内 まりや, Takeuchi Mariya; born 20 March 1955) is a Japanese singer-songwriter and record producer. Regarded as the "Queen of City Pop", Takeuchi is one of the best-selling music artists in Japan with over 16 million records sold. Internationally, her 1985 song "Plastic Love" became a sleeper hit and the catalyst of the 21st century revival of city pop.

Takeuchi was born in Taisha, Hikawa district, now the city of Izumo, Shimane, and attended Keio University. She signed with RCA in 1978, releasing five albums under the label which appeared on the Oricon Charts, including her chart-topping third effort Love Songs (1980). She terminated her contract with RCA in 1981 and announced a temporary hiatus. In 1982, she married singer and songwriter Tatsuro Yamashita. She signed with Moon Records in 1984, and internationally released her sixth studio album Variety that same year to commercial success. She has since released seven more studio albums and one live album. All of her works have continued to appear on the Oricon Charts, and since 2001, each one of her albums have topped it.

Takeuchi has stayed with the Moon record label, working with the different branches since signing in 1984; since 1998, she has also been signed with Warner Music Japan. Her single "Inochi no Uta" (いのちの歌; Song of Life), when re-recorded in 2020, made her the oldest Japanese singer to have a single top the Oricon Charts.

== Early life ==
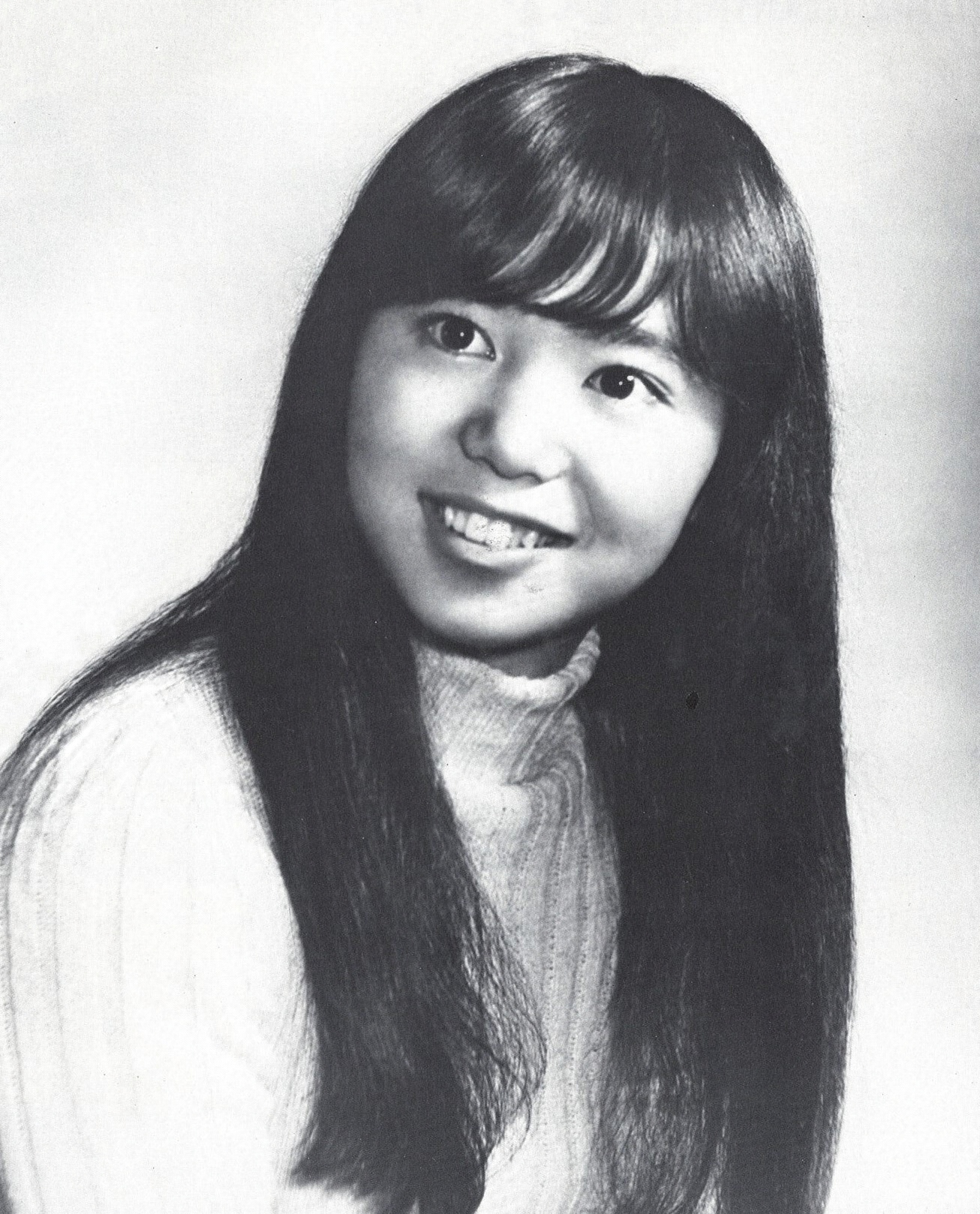
Takeuchi's yearbook photo, 1973

Takeuchi was born in Taisha in the Hikawa district of Shimane Prefecture in Japan. She grew up in the family Shinise Ryokan (Japanese long-established inn) business by the name of Takenoya, that her paternal great-grandfather Shigezo Takeuchi (竹内繁蔵) founded in 1877. Her family always played records from all over the world. She had already learned to play piano and guitar by third grade, but the Beatles left an impression that inspired her to travel.

In 1972, for her third year of high school, she studied in Rock Falls, Illinois, United States, as an international exchange student through the AFS Intercultural Programs. Her nickname was Mako, as one of the AFS yearbooks has a caption that reads Mariya "Mako" Takeuchi. She entered the Japanese Keio University in 1974, majoring in English literature and won a nationwide English recitation contest by The Japan Times in the spring of that year.

== Career ==
=== Debut and early success ===
Takeuchi joined the music club of her university and there she was invited to participate in Masamichi Sugi (杉真理)'s recordings and in March 1978 so-called the omnibus album Loft Sessions (ロフト・セッションズ) recordings. In August that year she signed up with the RCA recording label, and in November her debut single "Modotte oide, Watashi no Jikan" (戻っておいで・私の時間; Please come back, my time), and her debut album Beginning were released. The 1979 singles "Dream of You: Lemon Lime no Aoi Kaze" (ドリーム・オブ・ユー〜レモンライムの青い風〜; Dream of You: Blue Breeze of Lemon Lime) and "September" were hits, and with that she won the 1979 Japan Record Awards, Tokyo Music Festival, Japan Music Awards, Shinjuku Music Festival, and Ginza Music Festival best new artist awards as a singer. The 1980 single "Fushigi na Peach Pie" (不思議なピーチパイ; Mysterious Peach Pie) was also another hit. Takeuchi has had one song "Apple Papple Princess" (アップル・パップル・プリンセス) (1981) that appear on the NHK program Minna no Uta.

=== Hiatus and songwriting for others ===
From the late 1970s to the early 1980s, she recorded five albums and several singles. Those recordings featured dozens of prominent Japanese and North American songwriters, instrumentalists and producers, including Kazuhiko Katō, Tetsuji Hayashi, Shigeru Suzuki, Masamichi Sugi, Takashi Matsumoto, Al Capps, Peter Allen, David Lasley, Alan O'Day, David Foster, Jim Keltner, Jay Graydon, Steve Lukather, Jeff Porcaro, David Hungate, and a fellow RCA artist and her future partner and husband, Tatsuro Yamashita. One of her songs from the 1980 album Miss M (Miss M), "Heart to Heart" (music by Roger Nichols), was given English lyrics and a new title, "Now". It was recorded by the Carpenters, released in 1983, and was the last recording by Karen Carpenter before her death. At the end of 1981, after the release of her fifth album Portrait (PORTRAIT), she announced she was going to take a break for a while and paused holding concerts and new releases, and got married six months later. While taking a break she continued composing for numerous different idols and singers such as Naoko Kawai, Hiroko Yakushimaru, Yukiko Okada, Akina Nakamori, Miho Nakayama, Hiromi Iwasaki, Masahiko Kondo, among many others.

=== Return and chart success ===
Several of these songs scored top-ten on the Oricon, such as "Kenka wo Yamete" (けんかをやめて; Stop the Fighting) and "Invitation" performed by Naoko Kawai, "Dreaming Girl: Koi, Hajimemashite" (-Dreaming Girl- 恋、はじめまして; Dreaming Girl: Love, Nice to Meet You) performed by Yukiko Okada, and "Iro: White Blend" (色・ホワイトブレンド; Color: White Blend) performed by Miho Nakayama. Takeuchi has often re-recorded those songs for her own album. "Eki" (駅; Station), a song originally written for the album by Akina Nakamori, became known by the composer's recorded version, and had been covered by many artists. "Genki wo Dashite", a song first recorded by Hiroko Yakushimaru, is recognized as one of Takeuchi's notable compositions. The song was later covered by Hitomi Shimatani in 2003, and became a moderate hit.

Since her return to the Japanese music industry in 1984, she has recorded seven successful studio albums that mainly consist of her self-written songs, and all of them had reached No. 1 on the Japanese Oricon chart. As a singer-songwriter, she has produced eight top-ten hit singles on the Oricon chart, including "Single Again" (シングル・アゲイン), "Kokuhaku" (告白; Confession), "Junai Rhapsody" (純愛ラプソディ; Pure Love Rhapsody), "Kon'ya wa Hearty Party" (今夜はHearty Party; Hearty Party Tonight), and her only No. 1 hit "Camouflage" (カムフラージュ). In addition to her work as a performer, she has continued writing songs and lyrics for other singers, including Ryōko Hirosue, Takako Matsu, Riho Makise, Seiko Matsuda, Masayuki Suzuki and Tackey & Tsubasa.

Several of these songs scored top-ten on the Oricon, such as "Maji de Koi suru 5 byō mae" (MajiでKoiする5秒前; 5 Seconds Before I Fall in Love Seriously) performed by Ryōko Hirosue, "Miracle Love" performed by Riho Makise, "Minna Hitori" (みんなひとり; Everybody is Alone) performed by Takako Matsu, and "Minna no Happy Birthday" (みんなのハッピーバースデイ; Everyone's Happy Birthday) performed by Mana Ashida.

=== Legacy and resurgence ===
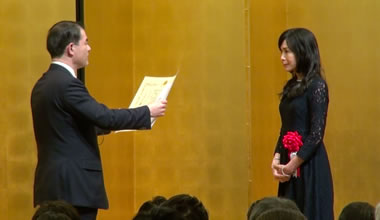
Takeuchi in 2019

Up to September 2014, Takeuchi had released 12 studio albums, 42 singles, several compilations and a live album which was recorded in 2000. Her total sales have been estimated at more than 16 million units by 2009. Her 1994 compilation, Impressions, sold more than 3 million copies in Japan alone, and became her best-selling album. In addition to her musical career, she has also managed her family's Ryokan Takenoya since May 2018 "until the next generation can take over".

Outside of Japan, she is best known for the city pop song "Plastic Love" from her number-one album Variety (1984). At the time of the song's release, Takeuchi had not considered attempting to release her music in the Western world, stating in a 2018 interview, "Considering that [the song] was mostly performed in Japanese, we figured it would be impossible to go abroad." The song went viral after it was uploaded to YouTube during the mid-late 2010s. Popularized overseas via the vaporwave and future funk scenes, the song has received more than 67 million views on YouTube as of June 2021. It has received critical acclaim, with Noisey calling it "the best pop song in the world" and Gorillaz co-creator Damon Albarn calling it "a wonder woman slab of Japanese funk". K-pop singer Yubin's "City Love" is also based on this song. The Blessed Madonna closed a Resident Advisor November 2017 mix with a rendition of this song as well. Chai released a cover of the song in 2020. "Plastic Love" has also inspired numerous fan art and videos. On 17 May 2019, Warner Music Japan released on YouTube a short version of a music video for the song, 35 years after its initial release. A longer, five minute version was subsequently released on 11 November 2021.

=== Recent work ===
In 2021, Takeuchi formed a new duo called Peach & Apricot with Anri, a Japanese pop singer-songwriter. "Peach" refers to Takeuchi's popular hit "Fushigi na Peach Pie" (不思議なピーチパイ; Mysterious Peach Pie), while "Apricot" comes from Anri's debut album title Apricot Jam. On 3 November 2021, they released their first song together, "Watching Over You". The lyrics were written by Takeuchi, while the music was composed and arranged by Tetsuji Hayashi. The song marks the first collaboration between Hayashi and Takeuchi in 40 years since "Ichigo no Yuuwaku", and Hayashi's first with Anri in 38 years since "You Are Not Alone".

== Personal life ==
Her husband is Tatsuro Yamashita, a singer-songwriter and record producer, whom she married in 1982. They have one daughter. Takeuchi has a niece.

Kiyoshi Matsuo, a Japanese record producer, who had mentioned Johnny Kitagawa's sexual harassment allegations in various media, had his management contract terminated in the middle of the period by Smile Company, to which he had belonged. He stated that Takeuchi and her husband Tatsuro Yamashita, who also belong to the company, agreed with the company's policy.

== Discography ==
=== Albums ===
Year	Title	Label	Chart positions (JP)	Certifications	Sales
1978	Beginning	RCA	17		113,000
1979	University Street	RCA	7		236,000
1980	Love Songs	RCA	1		358,000
1980	Miss M	RCA	14		73,000
1981	Portrait	RCA	14		103,000
1984	Variety	Moon Records (Warner Music Japan)	1		483,000
1987	Request	Moon Records (Warner Music Japan)	1	IFPI Hong Kong: Gold	1,072,000
1992	Quiet Life	Moon Records (Warner Music Japan)	1	RIAJ: 3× Platinum (old threshold)	1,155,000
2000	Souvenir: Mariya Takeuchi Live (live album)	Moon Records (Warner Music Japan)	3	RIAJ: Platinum (old threshold)	335,000
2001	Bon Appetit!	Moon Records (Warner Music Japan)	1	RIAJ: 3× Platinum (old threshold)	1,224,000
2004	Longtime Favorites (cover album)	Moon Records (Warner Music Japan)	1	RIAJ: Platinum	348,000
2007	Denim	Moon Records (Warner Music Japan)	1	RIAJ: 2× Platinum	466,000
2014	Trad	Moon Records (Warner Music Japan)	1	RIAJ: Platinum	262,000
2024	Precious Days	Moon Records (Warner Music Japan)	1		129,349

=== Compilations ===
Year	Title	Label	Certifications	Sales
1982	Viva Mariya!!	RCA		32,000
1990	Morning Glory	Moon Records		21,000
1994	Impressions	Moon Records	RIAJ: 3× Million	3,052,000
2008	Expressions	Moon Records	RIAJ: Million	947,000
2008	Sincerely... The Mariya Takeuchi Songbook Complete Edition (English covers of her songs by various artists)	Universal Music		
2013	Mariya's Songbook (Songs written for various singers)	Moon Records		
2019	Turntable (Other best songs that did not collected in Expressions, and Mariya's rarities, Premium covers)	Moon Records	RIAJ: Gold	128,456
2019	Yukiko Okada, Mariya's Songbook (Songs written for Yukiko Okada)	Pony Canyon		

=== Singles ===
Year	Title	Chart positions (JP)	Album
1978	"Modotte oide, Watashi no Jikan" (戻っておいで･私の時間; Please Come Back, My Time)	84	BEGINNING
1979	"Dream of You: Lemon Lime no Aoi Kaze" (ドリーム・オブ・ユー〜レモンライムの青い風〜; Dream of You: Blue Breeze of Lemon Lime)	30	UNIVERSITY STREET
1979	"September" (SEPTEMBER)	39	LOVE SONGS
1980	"Fushigi na Peach Pie" (不思議なピーチパイ; Mysterious Peach Pie)	3	LOVE SONGS
1980	"Futari no Vacance" (二人のバカンス; Vacation for Two)	42	Miss M
1980	"Sweetest Music" (SWEETEST MUSIC)	did not chart	Miss M
1981	"Ichigo no Yūwaku" (イチゴの誘惑; Temptation of Strawberry)	80	PORTRAIT
1981	"Special Delivery: Tokubetsu Kokubin" (SPECIAL DELIVERY〜特別航空便; Special Delivery: Special Airmail)	did not chart	PORTRAIT
1981	"Natalie" (NATALIE) / "Apple Papple Princess" (アップル・パップル・プリンセス)	70	PORTRAIT (#1); Turntable (#2)
1984	"Mou Ichido" (もう一度; Once Again) / "Honki de Only You (Let's Get Married)" (本気でオンリーユー (Let's Get Married); Seriously, Only You (Let's Get Married))	20	VARIETY
1984	"Mersey Beat de Utawasete" (マージービートで唄わせて; Sing with Mersey Beat)	78	VARIETY
1985	"Plastic Love" (プラスティック・ラヴ)	5	VARIETY
1986	"Koi no Arashi" (恋の嵐; Love Storm)	20	REQUEST
1986	"Toki no Tabibito" (時空の旅人; Time Traveller)	46	REQUEST
1987	"Yume no Tsuzuki" (夢の続き; Continuation of the Dream)	43	REQUEST
1987	"Eki" (駅; Station) / "After Years" (AFTER YEARS)	55	REQUEST (#1); Quiet Life (#2)
1988	"Genki o Dashite" (元気を出して; Cheer Up)	70	REQUEST
1989	"Single Again" (シングル・アゲイン)	2	Quiet Life
1990	"Kokuhaku" (告白; Confession)	3	Quiet Life
1992	"Manhattan Kiss" (マンハッタン・キス)	11	Quiet Life
1992	"Uchi ni Kaerō (My Sweet Home)" (家に帰ろう (マイ・スイート・ホーム); Let's Go Home (My Sweet Home))	18	Quiet Life
1993	"Shiawase no Sagashikata" (幸せの探し方; How to Find Happiness)	42	Quiet Life
1994	"Ashita no Watashi" (明日の私; I in Tomorrow)	19	Impressions
1994	"Junai Rhapsody" (純愛ラプソディ; Pure Love Rhapsody)	5	Impressions
1994	"Honki de Only You (Let's Get Married)" (本気でオンリーユー (Let's Get Married); Seriously, Only You (Let's Get Married)') / "Forever Friends" (Forever friends)(Re-issue)	48	VARIETY (#1); Quiet Life (#2)
1995	"Kon'ya wa Hearty Party" (今夜はHearty Party; Hearty Party Tonight)	3	Bon Appetit!
1996	"Lonely Woman" (ロンリー・ウーマン) / "Tell me, tell me" (Tell me, tell me)	13	Bon Appetit!
1998	"Camouflage" (カムフラージュ) / "Winter Lovers" (WINTER LOVERS)	1	Bon Appetit!
1999	"Tenshi no Tameiki" (天使のため息; Sigh of an Angel) / "Soulmate wo Sagasite" (ソウルメイトを探して; Looking for My Soulmate)	6	Bon Appetit!
2001	"Mayonaka no Nightingale" (真夜中のナイチンゲール; Midnight Nightingale)	7	Bon Appetit!
2001	"Mainichi ga Special" (毎日がスペシャル; Every Day is a Special Day)	40	Bon Appetit!
2001	"Nostalgia" (ノスタルジア)	30	Bon Appetit!
2006	"Henshin" (返信; Reply) / ""Synchronicity (Suteki na Guzen)" (シンクロニシティ (素敵な偶然); Synchronicity (Wonderful Coincidence))	8	Denim
2006	"Slow Love" (スロー・ラヴ)	30	Denim
2006	"Ashita no Nai Koi" (明日のない恋; Love Without Tomorrow)	19	Denim
2007	"Chance no Maegami" (チャンスの前髪; The Fortune by the Forelock) (duet with Yuko Hara) / "Jinsei no Tobira" (人生の扉; Doors of Life)	23	Expressions (#1); Denim (#2)
2008	"Shiawase no Monosashi" (幸せのものさし; Measure of Happiness) / "Ureshikute Samishii Hi (Your Wedding Day)" (うれしくてさみしい日 (Your Wedding Day); Happy and Lonely Day (Your Wedding Day))	6	Expressions
2008	"Enishi no Ito" (縁の糸; Thread of Fate)	12	TRAD
2010	"Whisky ga Osuki desho" (ウイスキーが、お好きでしょ; You Like Whiskey)	18	TRAD
2012	"Inochi no Uta" (いのちの歌; Song of Life)	10	TRAD
2013	"Tasogare Diary" (たそがれダイアリー; Twilight Diary)	15	TRAD
2013	"Dear Angie: Anata wa Makenai" (Dear Angie〜あなたは負けない; Dear Angie: You Won't Lose) / "Sorezore no Yoru" (それぞれの夜; Respective Night)	7	TRAD
2013	"Your Eyes" (Your Eyes) (download limited)		TRAD
2014	""Aloha Shiki Renai Sinan" (アロハ式恋愛指南; Aloha Style Love Instruction) (download limited)		TRAD
2014	"Shizukana Densetsu (legend)" (静かな伝説 (レジェンド); Quiet Legend (legend))	10	TRAD
2016	"Let It Be Me" (レット・イット・ビー・ミー) (duet with Tatsuro Yamashita) (download limited)		Expressions
2016	"Kyo no Omoi" (今日の想い; Today's Feelings) (download limited)		
2018	"Chiisana Negai" (小さな願い; Little Wish) / "Ima wo Ikiyou (Seize the Day)" (今を生きよう (Seize the Day); Let's Live Today (Seize the Day))	6	
2019	"Tabi no Tsuzuki" (旅のつづき; Continuation of the Journey)	3	
2020	"Inochi no Uta (Special Edition)" (いのちの歌 (スペシャル・エディション); Song of Life (Special Edition))	1	

=== Songwriting credits for other singers ===
Year	Singer	Title	Chart positions (JP)	Album (Mariya's self-cover)
1980	Ann Lewis	"LINDA" (リンダ)		PORTRAIT
1982	Naoko Kawai	"Kenka wo Yamete" (けんかをやめて; Stop the Fighting)	5	REQUEST
1982	Naoko Kawai	"Invitation" (Invitation)	8	
1982	Chiemi Hori	"Machi Bouke" (待ちぼうけ; Waiting For)	26	
1982	Hiromi Iwasaki	"My Darling" (My Darling)*Music only	14	
1982	Keiko Masuda	"55 page no Kanashimi" (55ページの悲しみ; Sadness on Page 55)		
1982	Keiko Masuda	"Rasen Kaidan" (らせん階段; Spiral Staircase)		
1982	KINYA	"Namida no Date" (涙のデイト; Tears of Date)		
1983	Masahiro Kuwana	"Sweet Rain" (Sweet Rain)		
1984	Hiroko Yakushimaru	"Genki wo Dashite" (元気を出して; Cheer Up)	1; *Album chart	REQUEST
1984	Hiroko Yakushimaru	"Triangle" (トライアングル)	1; *Album chart	Turntable
1984	Yukiko Okada	"First Date" (ファースト・デイト)	20	Turntable
1984	Yukiko Okada	"Akogare" (憧れ; Yearning)		Turntable
1984	Yukiko Okada	"Dreaming Girl: Koi, Hajimemashite" (-Dreaming Girl- 恋、はじめまして; Dreaming Girl: Love, Nice to Meet You)	7	Turntable
1984	Yukiko Okada	"Little Princess" (リトル プリンセス)	14	
1984	Yukiko Okada	"Sayonara: Natsuyasumi" (さよなら・夏休み; Goodbye: Summer Vacation)		
1985	Hiroko Yakushimaru	"Kako karano Tegami" (過去からの手紙; The Letter from the Past)*Lyrics only	2; *Album chart	
1985	Yukiko Okada	"Kanashii Yokan" (哀しい予感; Sad Premonition)	7	
1985	Yukiko Okada	"Koibitotachi no Calendar" (恋人たちのカレンダー; Lovers' Calendar)	7	
1985	Yukiko Okada	"Lonesome Season" (ロンサム・シーズン)		Quiet Life
1986	Akina Nakamori	"Eki" (駅; Station)	1; *Album chart	REQUEST
1986	Akina Nakamori	"OH NO, OH YES!" (OH NO, OH YES!)	1; *Album chart	REQUEST
1986	Akina Nakamori	"Yakusoku" (約束; Promise)	1; *Album chart	Turntable
1986	Akina Nakamori	"Aka no Enamel" (赤のエナメル; Enamel of Red)	1; *Album chart	VARIETY; 30th Anniversary Edition
1986	Akina Nakamori	"Mick Jagger ni Hohoemi wo" (ミック・ジャガーに微笑みを; Smile for Mick Jagger)	1; *Album chart	Mariya's Songbook (First Limited Edition); Demo source
1986	Miho Nakayama	"Iro White Blend" (色・ホワイトブレンド; Colored White Blend)	5	REQUEST
1986	Miho Nakayama	"Tokimeki no Season" (ときめきの季節; Season of Excitement)	5	Mariya's Songbook (First Limited Edition); Demo source
1986	Eri Morishita	"Hey! Baby" (Hey! Baby)		Turntable
1986	Eri Morishita	"Manatsu no Date" (真冬のデイト; Midwinter Date)		Turntable
1986	Masahiko Kondō	"Eve no Kokuhaku" (イヴの告白; Eve's Confession)*Lyrics only		
1987	Hiroko Yakushimaru	"Afternoon Tea" (アフタヌーン・ティー)	3; *Album chart	
1987	Satomi Fukunaga	"Natsu no Intro" (夏のイントロ; Intro of Summer)	14	Mariya's Songbook (First Limited Edition); Demo source
1988	Hiroko Yakushimaru	"Shugakusho" (終楽章; Final Movement)	8; *Album chart	Denim
1988	Masayuki Suzuki	"Guilty" (Guilty)*Lyrics only	12; *Album chart	
1988	Masayuki Suzuki	"Misty Mauve" (Misty Mauve)*Lyrics only	12; *Album chart	
1991	Riho Makise	"Miracle Love" (Miracle Love)	4	Turntable
1997	Ryōko Hirosue	"Maji de Koi suru 5 byō mae" (MajiでKoiする5秒前, 5 Seconds Before I Fall in Love Seriously)	2	Turntable
1997	Ryōko Hirosue	"Tomadoi" (とまどい; Bewildered)	2	Bon Appetit!
1997	Ryōko Hirosue	"Koi no Counsel" (恋のカウンセル; Love Counsel)	3; *Album chart	
1997	Ryōko Hirosue	"Iidase nakute" (言い出せなくて; It's Hard to Say)	3; *Album chart	
2004	Tackey & Tsubasa	"You & I" (You & I)*Lyrics only	2; *Album chart	
2006	Takako Matsu	"Minna Hitori" (みんなひとり; Everybody is Alone)	10	Denim
2007	Takako Matsu	"Reunion" (リユニオン)	10; *Album chart	TRAD
2008	Mitsuki Takahata	"Natsu no Montage" (夏のモンタージュ; Summer Montage)	30	TRAD
2009	ManaKana	"Inochi no Uta" (いのちの歌; Song of Life)*Lyrics only	18	TRAD
2011	Seiko Matsuda	"Tokubetsu na Koibito" (特別な恋人; Special Lover)	14	TRAD
2011	Seiko Matsuda	"Koe dake Kikasete" (声だけ聞かせて; Let Me Hear Just Your Voice)	14	Turntable
2011	Mana Ashida	"Minna no Happy Birthday" (みんなのハッピーバースデイ; Everyone's Happy Birthday)	8; *Album chart	
2011	Aya Matsuura	"Subject: Sayonara" (Subject:さようなら; Subject: Goodbye)		
2017	Saori Hayami	"Yume no Hate made" (夢の果てまで; To the End of the Dream)	21	
