= Hiroko Yakushimaru =

Japanese actress and singer

- 薬師丸 ひろ子
- Born: Hiroko Yakushimaru (薬師丸博子); June 9, 1964 (age 62); Shibuya, Tokyo, Japan
- Occupations: Actress, singer
- Years active: 1978–present
- Spouse: Kōji Tamaki (m. 1991; div. 1998)

YouTube information
- Channel: 薬師丸ひろ子
- Years active: 2021-present
- Subscribers: 68.1 thousand
- Views: 42.7 million
- Last updated: April 15, 2025

Hiroko Yakushimaru (薬師丸 ひろ子, Yakushimaru Hiroko; born June 9, 1964) is a Japanese actress and singer.

== Biography ==
After passing the audition for the film produced by Haruki Kadokawa, she began her acting career. Along with teen idols Tomoyo Harada and Noriko Watanabe who debuted from Kadokawa Haruki Corporation, she was often dubbed as one of "Kadokawa Sannin-musume" in her early career.

Yakushimaru made her acting debut in the 1978 movie Never Give Up. In 1981, she came into prominence with Sailor Suit and Machine Gun, the film where she played the leading role. She also recorded the same-titled theme song for the film, which hit No. 1 on Oricon in late 1981 and stayed there until January 18, 1982.

Since rising to fame, Yakushimaru has gained success as both an actress and a pop singer, mainly during the 1980s. She had also worked as a prolific recording artist until her marriage with Kōji Tamaki, the leader of the band Anzen Chitai. According to the Japanese Oricon chart, combined sales of her singles and albums have been estimated approximately 5.9 million copies to date.

== Filmography ==
=== Film ===
Year	Title	Role	Notes
1978	Never Give Up 野性の証明 (Yasei no Shomei)	Yoriko Nagai	
1979	G.I. Samurai (戦国自衛隊, Sengoku Jieitai)	Young samurai	
1980	Toward the Terra	Jonah Matsuka (voice)	
1980	Tonda Couple (翔んだカップル)	Kei Yamaba (leading role)	Yokohama Film Festival for Best Actress Award (Character); Japan Academy Prize for Popularity Award
1981	Nerawareta Gakuen (ねらわれた学園)	Yuka Mitamura (leading role)	
1981	Sailor Suit and Machine Gun (セーラー服と機関銃, Sailor-Fuku to Kikanju)	Izumi Hoshi (leading role)	Japan Academy Prize for Popularity Award (Character)
1982	Yosooi no Machi (装いの街)	Kayoko Ōdate (leading role)	
1983	Detective Story (探偵物語, Tantei Monogatari)	Naomi Arai (leading role)	
1983	Legend of the Eight Samurai (里見八犬伝, Satomi Hakkenden)	Shizu-hime (leading role)	
1984	Main Theme	Shibuki Ogasawara (leading role)	
1984	W's Tragedy (Wの悲劇, W no Higeki)	Shizuka Mita (leading role)	Blue Ribbon Award for Best Actress; Nominated – Japan Academy Prize for Outstanding Performance by an Actress in a Leading Role; Japan Academy Prize for Popularity Award (Character)
1985	Yabanjin no Yo ni (野蛮人のように)	Tamako Arisugawa (leading role)	
1986	Cabaret	waitress (cameo)	
1986	Shinshi Dōmei (紳士同盟)	Etsuko Kirino (leading role)	
1988	Downtown Heroes	Fusako Nakahara (leading role)	
1989	Ready! Lady	Ryoko Takahashi (leading role)	
1990	Byōin e Ikō (病院へ行こう)	Midori Yoshikawa (leading role)	
1990	Tasmania Monogatari (タスマニア物語)	Naoko Hirashima	Japan Academy Prize for Popularity Award (Character)
1992	Kira Kira Hikaru (きらきらひかる)	Shoko Kishida (leading role)	
1993	Nurse Call	Kozue Igarashi (leading role)	
1997	Magnitude: Asu e no Kakehashi (マグニチュード 明日への架け橋)	Yoko Hioki	
2003	Kisarazu Cat's Eye: Nihon Series (木更津キャッツアイ 日本シリーズ)	Mirei Asada	
2004	Lakeside Murder Case	Minako Namiki	
2005	Princess Raccoon (オペレッタ狸御殿, Operetta Tanuki-Goten)	O'Hagi no Tsubone	
2005	Tetsujin 28-Gō (鉄人28号)	Yoko Kaneda	
2005	Always: Sunset on Third Street	Tomoe Suzuki	Japan Academy Film Prize for Outstanding Performance by an Actress in a Supporting Role; Blue Ribbon Award for Best Supporting Actress; Kinema Junpo Year-End – Best Supporting Actress for Domestic Film; Hochi Film Award for Best Supporting Actress
2006	Aogeba Tōtoshi (あおげば尊し)	Mari Minegishi	
2006	Kisarazu Cat's Eye: World Series (木更津キャッツアイ ワールドシリーズ)	Mirei Asada	
2006	Arigatō (ありがとう)	Yoshiko Iida	
2007	Bubble Fiction: Boom or Bust	Mariko Tanaka	
2007	Always: Sunset on Third Street 2	Tomoe Suzuki	Nominated – Japan Academy Prize for Outstanding Performance by an Actress in a Leading Role
2007	Megane	Morishita ("Megane"'s Friend)	
2008	Utatama	Yuko Senuma	
2009	Heaven's Door	Mariko Shiraishi	
2010	A Good Husband (今度は愛妻家)	Sakura Kitami	Nominated – Japan Academy Prize for Outstanding Performance by an Actress in a Leading Role
2010	Hanamizuki	Ryoko Hirasawa	
2011	Wasao (わさお)	Setsuko Kikutani (leading role)	
2012	Always: Sunset on Third Street 3	Tomoe Suzuki	
2015	Sinbad: A Flying Princess and a Secret Island	Sinbad's Mother (voice)	
2017	Destiny: The Tale of Kamakura	Shizuka	
2017	The 8-Year Engagement	Hatsumi Nakahara	
2018	Cafe Funiculi Funicula	Kayo Kōtake	
2019	Black School Rules	Virginia Woolf	
2020	Mio's Cookbook	Ohyaku	
2022	Riverside Mukolitta	(voice)	
2022	Tombi: Father and Son	Taeko	
2024	Last Mile	Natsuyo Misumi	
2024	Blue Period	Masako Saeki	
2026	Sukiyaki	Iku Oshima	

=== Television ===
Year	Title	Role	Notes
1978	Teki ka? Mikata ka? 3 tai 3 (敵か?味方か?3対3)	Third daughter of the wife	
1979	Yosooi no Machi (装いの街)	Kayoko Ōdate (leading role)	It was released in cinemas later.
1997	Mrs. Cinderella	Mizuho Kayama (leading role)	
2000	Ren’ai Chudoku (恋愛中毒, Love addiction)	Miu Minazuki (leading role)	
2000	Africa Pole Pole	Naoko	
2002	Mama no Idenshi (ママの遺伝子, Mom's gene)	Nanami Fujiki (leading role)	
2002	Honkon Myōjō Mei (香港明星迷, Hong Kong star fans)	Satomi Kudo (leading role)	
2002	Kisarazu Cat's Eye	Mirei Asada	
2004	Black Jack ni Yoroshiku ~Namida no Gan Byōtō-hen (ブラックジャックによろしく 〜涙のがん病棟編〜, Say hello to Black Jack: The part of the tragic cancer ward)	Yoshie Tsujimoto	
2004	Ningen da mono ~Mitsuo Aida Story~ (にんげんだもの〜相田みつを物語〜)	Chie Aida (leading role)	
2005	Tiger & Dragon	Katsuko Shiraishi	Guest of Episode 6
2005	1 Litre no Namida (1リットルの涙, 1 Liter of Tears)	Shioka Ikeuchi	
2005	Umeko	Momoko Kawai	
2007	Byakkotai	Shige Sakai	
2007	1 Litre no Namida: Special Edition – Tsuioku	Shioka Ikeuchi	
2007	Papa no Namida de Ko wa Sodatsu (パパの涙で子は育つ, The child grew up with tears of dad)	Fumika Kawamura	
2008	Aiba Monogatari (愛馬物語, Favorite horse story)	Sachiko Nozoe	
2008	Homeless Chūgakusei (ホームレス中学生, Homeless junior high student)	Keiko Tamura	
2008	Sen no Kaze ni natte Drama Special "Nadeshiko-tai ~Shōjo tachi dake ga Mita Tokkōtai – Fūinsareta 23 nichikan~" (千の風になって ドラマスペシャル「なでしこ隊〜少女達だけが見た特攻隊・封印された23日間〜)	Tome Torihama	
2008	Aruga mama no Kimi de Ite (あるがままの君でいて)	Yuka Enomoto	
2009	Senjō no Melody (戦場のメロディ, Melody of battlefield)	Hamako Watanabe (leading role)	
2010	Unubore Deka (うぬぼれ刑事, Conceit detective)	Nobuko Maehara	Guest of Episode 5
2010	Gekai Suma Hisayoshi (外科医 須磨久善, Surgeon Hisayoshi Suma)	Chiyoko Suma	
2010	Q10	Kuriko Yanagi	
2011	Zenkai Girl (全開ガール, Girl full throttle)	Shoko Sakuragawa	
2012	Tsuma ga Otto wo Okuru Toki (妻が夫をおくるとき, When a wife sees off her husband)	Fukuko Ishii (leading role)	
2012	Kurumaisu de Boku wa Sora wo Tobu (車イスで僕は空を飛ぶ, I fly in the sky by my wheelchair)	Haruko Hasebe	
2013	Amachan	Hiromi Suzuka	Asadora
2016	Yuriko-san no Ehon (百合子さんの絵本, Yuriko's picture book)	Yuriko Onodera	
2018	Unnatural	Natsuyo Misumi	Special appearance
2019	Idaten	Marie	Taiga drama
2020	Yell	Mitsuko Sekiuchi	Asadora
2022	Lost Man Found (拾われた男)	Yamamura	

== Discography ==
=== Albums ===
==== Studio albums ====
Year	Album details	Chart positions	Label
Year	Album details	JPN	Label
1982	Seishun no Memoire (青春のメモワール) (featuring monologue by Hiroko Yakushimaru): Collection of excerpts from the motion pictures that Yakushimaru starred in: Never Give Up (1978) and Nerawareta Gakuen (1981); Released: April 21, 1982	1	Nippon Columbia
1984	Kokinshū (古今集): 1st studio album; Released: February 14, 1984	1	Toshiba EMI/East World
1985	Yume Jūwa (夢十話): 2nd studio album; Released: August 8, 1985	2	Toshiba EMI/East World
1986	Hana Zukan (花図鑑): 3rd studio album; Released: June 9, 1986	2	Toshiba EMI/East World
1987	Hoshi Kikō (星紀行): Live album; Released: July 7, 1987	3	Toshiba EMI/East World
1988	Sincerely Yours: 5th studio album; Released: April 6, 1988	8	Toshiba EMI/East World
1989	Lover's Concerto: 6th studio album; Released: February 15, 1989	2	Toshiba EMI/East World
1990	Heart's Delivery: 7th studio album; Released: March 28, 1990	3	Toshiba EMI/East World
1991	Primavera: 8th studio album; Released: March 13, 1991	13	Toshiba EMI/East World
1998	Koibumi: Love Letter (恋文): 9th studio album; Released: February 2, 1998	—	BMG Funhouse
2018	Etoile: 10th studio album; Released: May 9, 2018	18	Victor Entertainment Japan
2024	Tree: 11th studio album; Released: January 24, 2024	17	Victor Entertainment Japan
"—" denotes releases that did not chart.

==== Compilation albums ====
Year	Album	Chart positions (JP)	Label
1986	Best Collection	7	Toshiba EMI/East World
1988	Sentence (Sentence～セ・ン・テ・ン・ス～, Se N Te N Su)	18	Toshiba EMI/East World
2000	Love Collection: 1981–2000	—	BMG Funhouse
2011	Uta Monogatari (歌物語)	43	EMI Music Japan
2021	Indian Summer	23	Victor Entertainment Japan
"—" denotes releases that did not chart or the information is unknown.

==== Cover albums ====
Year	Album	Chart positions (JP)	Label
2013	Toki no Tobira (時の扉)	24	EMI Music Japan
2016	Cinema Songs	28	Victor Entertainment Japan

==== Live albums ====
Year	Album	Chart positions (JP)	Label
1987	First Live: Hoshi Kikō (ファースト・ライヴ 星紀行)	94	Toshiba EMI/East World
2017	Best Songs 1981–2017: Live in Kasuga-taisha	34	Victor Entertainment Japan
2020	Yakushimaru Hiroko 2019 Concert	56	Victor Entertainment Japan
2023	Yakushimaru Hiroko 2022 Concert	—	Victor Entertainment Japan
2024	Yakushimaru Hiroko 2023 Concert	26	Victor Entertainment Japan
2026	Yakushimaru Hiroko 2024 Concert	44	Victor Entertainment Japan
"—" denotes releases that did not chart or the information is unknown.

==== Instrumental albums ====
Year	Album	Label
1986	Yakshimaru Hiroko Song Book Vol.1 (薬師丸ひろ子・ソング・ブック Vol.1): Music arranged by Akira Inoue	Toshiba EMI/East World
1987	Yakshimaru Hiroko Song Book Vol.2 (薬師丸ひろ子・ソング・ブック Vol.2): Music arranged by Mitsuo Hagita	Toshiba EMI/East World
1988	Yakshimaru Hiroko Song Book Vol.3 (薬師丸ひろ子・ソング・ブック Vol.3): Music arranged by Katsuhisa Hattori	Toshiba EMI/East World

==== Box sets ====
Year	Album	Label
2021	Yakushimaru Hiroko 40th Anniversary Box	Victor Entertainment Japan

=== Singles ===
Year	Album	Chart positions (JP)	Label
1981	"Sailor-fuku to Kikanjū" (セーラー服と機関銃)	1	Kitty Records
1983	"Tantei Monogatari" (探偵物語)	1	Toshiba EMI/East World
1983	"Main Theme" (メイン・テーマ) (1983)	2	Toshiba EMI/East World
1984	"Woman (W no Higeki Yori)" (Woman "Wの悲劇"より)	1	Toshiba EMI/East World
1985	"Anata o Motto Shiritakute" (あなたを・もっと・知りたくて)	2	Toshiba EMI/East World
1985	"Ten ni Hoshi, Chi ni Hana" (天に星.地に花.) (New remix long version)	12	Toshiba EMI/East World
1985	"Suteki na Koi no Wasurekata" (ステキな恋の忘れ方)	4	Toshiba EMI/East World
1986	"Sasayaki no Step" (ささやきのステップ)	3	Toshiba EMI/East World
1986	"Shinshi Dōmei" (紳士同盟)	2	Toshiba EMI/East World
1987	"Mune no Furiko" (胸の振子)	8	Toshiba EMI/East World
1988	"Shūgakushō" (終楽章)	10	Toshiba EMI/East World
1988	"Jidai" (時代)	9	Toshiba EMI/East World
1989	"Kataritsugu Ai ni" (語りつぐ愛に)	6	Toshiba EMI/East World
1989	"Windy Boy"	12	Toshiba EMI/East World
1990	"Te o Tsunaideite" (手をつないでいて) (1990)	35	Toshiba EMI/East World
1991	"Kaze ni Notte" (風に乗って)	35	Toshiba EMI/East World
1997	"Kōsaten (Sō, Sore ga Sō)" (交叉点 〜そう それがそう〜)	51	BMG Funhouse
1997	"Koibumi (Aishū-hen)" (恋文 〜哀愁篇〜)	—	BMG Funhouse
1998	"Smile Smile Smile" (smile スマイル smile)	—	BMG Funhouse
2000	"Love Holic"	—	BMG Funhouse
2011	"Boku no Takaramono" (僕の宝物)	169	EMI Music Japan
"—" denotes releases that did not chart.

==== Digital single ====
Year	Single	Reference
2016	"Senshi no Kyuushi"	
2021	"Come Back To Me: Eien no Yokogao"	
2023	"Suteki wo Atsumete"	
2023	"Toki no Michishirube"	
2024	"Kimi to Watashi no Uta"	

=== Video albums ===
Year	Album	Chart positions (JP)	Format
1987	Hoshi Kikō: Futari no Kaeru Basho (星紀行 〜二人の帰る場所〜)	-	LD, VHS, DVD, BD, CDV
1988	Tea Party: Sotsugyo Kinen (Tea Party－卒業記念－)	-	VHS, LD
1990	Heart's Delivery	-	VHS, LD, DVD, BD
2014	Toki no Tobira: 35th Anniversary Concert (時の扉)	-	DVD, BD
2015	Premium Acoustic Night Toki no Tobira: Look For A Star (時の扉)	-	DVD, BD
2018	Yakushima Hiroko Concert 2018 (薬師丸ひろ子コンサート)	-	DVD, BD
2020	Yakushima Hiroko Concert 2019 (薬師丸ひろ子コンサート)	-	DVD, BD
2022	Live at GLORIA CHAPEL 2021	-	DVD, BD
2023	Yakushima Hiroko Concert 2022 (薬師丸ひろ子コンサート)	-	DVD, BD
"—" denotes releases that did not chart.
