= Akina Nakamori singles discography =

- Singles: 54
- Promotional singles: 8

The singles discography of Japanese recording artist Akina Nakamori consists of 54 singles and eight promotional recordings.

To date, Nakamori has sold more than 25.7 million records nationwide. She has 22 No. 1 singles and 18 No. 1 albums, being the nineteenth best-selling artist in Japan of all-time.

== As lead artist ==
=== 1980s ===
List of singles as lead artist, with selected chart positions and certifications, showing year released and album name
Title	Year	Peak chart positions	Sales	RIAJ Certifications	Album
Title	Year	JPN	Sales	RIAJ Certifications	Album
"Slow Motion"	1982	30	174,500		Prologue
"Shōjo A"	1982	5	395,500	Gold	Variation
"Second Love"	1982	1	765,600	Platinum	Fantasy
"½ no Shinwa"	1983	1	573,100	Platinum	Best Akina Memoires
"Twilight (Yūgure Dayori)"	1983	2	429,600	Platinum	Best Akina Memoires
"Kinku"	1983	1	511,000	Platinum	Best Akina Memoires
"Kita Wing"	1984	2	614,200	Platinum	Anniversary
"Southern Wind"	1984	1	543,900	Platinum	Possibility
"Jukkai (1984)"	1984	1	611,500	Platinum	Possibility
"Kazari ja Nai no yo Namida wa"	1984	1	624,800	Platinum	Bitter and Sweet
"Meu amor é..."	1985	1	630,700	Platinum	D404ME
"Akaitori Nigeta" (Note: Special release exclusively on 12-inch EP.)	1985	1	353,700	Gold	Non-album single
"Sand Beige (Sabaku e)"	1985	1	460,700	Platinum	Best
"Solitude"	1985	1	335,800	Gold	Best
"Desire (Jōnetsu)"	1986	1	516,000	Platinum	CD'87
"Gypsy Queen"	1986	1	357,600	Gold	CD'87
"Fin"	1986	1	318,300	Gold	CD'87
"Nonfiction Ecstasy" (Note: Special release exclusively on cassette.)	1986	1	61,700		Best II
"Tango Noir"	1987	1	358,100	Gold	CD'87
"Blonde"	1987	1	301,400	Gold	Best II
"Nanpasen"	1987	1	413,000	Platinum	Best II
"Al-Mauj"	1988	1	296,600	Gold	Best II
"Tattoo"	1988	1	296,800	Gold	Best II
"I Missed the Shock"	1988	3	311,200	Gold	Best II
"Liar"	1989	1	274,700	Gold	Cruise

=== 1990s ===
List of singles as lead artist, with selected chart positions and certifications, showing year released and album name
Title	Year	Peak chart positions	Sales	RIAJ Certifications	Album
Title	Year	JPN	Sales	RIAJ Certifications	Album
"Dear Friend"	1990	1	547,900	Platinum	Best III
"Mizu ni Sashita Hana"	1990	1	339,800	Gold	Best III
"Futari Shizuka: Tenkawa Densetsu Satsujin Jiken yori"	1991	3	483,700	Gold	Best III
"Everlasting Love" / "Not Crazy to Me"	1993	10	129,300	Gold	Lyricism: Ballad Collection
"Kataomoi" / "Aibu"	1994	17	133,900		Utahime
"Yoru no Doko ka de (Night Shift)"	1994	14	118,000		Non-album singles
"Gekka"	1994	8	137,400	Gold	Non-album singles
"Genshi, Onna wa Taiyō Datta"	1995	15	100,200		La Alteración
"Tokyo Rose" (As Akina)	1995	32	35,700		True Album Akina 95 Best
"Moonlight Shadow: Tsuki ni Hoero"	1996	14	112,500	Gold	Shaker
"Appetite"	1997	46	29,400		Shaker
"Kisei (Never Forget)"	1998	19	94,900		Spoon
"Kon'ya, Nagareboshi"	1998	66	12,000		Spoon
"Tomadoi"	1998	40	10,400		Will
"Ophelia"	1999	29	38,500		Will
"Trust Me"	1999	57	4,600		Will

=== 2000s ===
List of singles as lead artist, with selected chart positions and certifications, showing year released and album name
Title	Year	Peak chart positions	Sales	RIAJ Certifications	Album
Title	Year	JPN	Sales	RIAJ Certifications	Album
"It's Brand New Day"	2001	—	—		Resonancia
"The Heat (Musica Fiesta)"	2002	20	14,700		Resonancia
"Days"	2003	30	10,100		I Hope So
"Akai Hana"	2004	40	5,100		Best Finger 25th Anniversary Selection
"Hajimete Deatta Hi no Yō ni"	2004	50	6,200		Best Finger 25th Anniversary Selection
"Rakka Ryūsui"	2005	43	5,000		Best Finger 25th Anniversary Selection
"Hana yo Odore"	2006	23	10,400		Destination
"Diva Single Version"	2009	50	1,600		Diva

=== 2010s–2020s ===
List of singles as lead artist, with selected chart positions and certifications, showing year released and album name
Title	Year	Peak chart positions		Sales	RIAJ Certifications	Album
Title	Year	JPN CD	JPN Hot	Sales	RIAJ Certifications	Album
"Crazy Love"	2010	—	—	—		All Time Best: Original
"Rojo (Tierra)"	2015	8	11	25,400		Fixer
"Unfixable"	2015	20	50	8,500		Fixer
"Fixer (While the Women Are Sleeping)"	2016	32	—	4,300		Fixer
"Gomen to, Suki to"	2026	7	67	11,096		TBA

== Promotional singles ==
List of promotional singles, showing year released and album name
Title	Year	Album
"Don't Tell Me This Is Love"	1985	My Best Thanks
"The Look That Kills"	1987	Cross My Palm
"Farewell"	1988	Stock
"Heartbreak"	1988	Femme Fatale
"Close Your Eyes"	1989	Cruise
"Sweet Rain"	2014	All Time Best: Original
"Gypsy Queen (Jazz)"	2024	TBA
"Blonde (Jazz)"	2024	TBA
"Slow Motion (Jazz)"	2024	TBA
"Tattoo (Jazz)"	2024	TBA
"Kita Wing (Jazz)"	2024	TBA
"Fin (Jazz)"	2024	TBA

== See also ==
- Akina Nakamori albums discography
- List of best-selling music artists in Japan
