= Timeline of Japanese music =

This page is a timeline of Japanese music and also indexes the individual year in Japanese music pages.

== 1870s ==
- 1878 - Demonstration of phonograph by James Alfred Ewing at Tokyo Imperial University on 16 November
- 1879 - Demonstration of phonograph by James Alfred Ewing at Tokyo Chamber of Commerce on 28 March

== 1880s ==
- 1888 - Kimigayo adopted as national anthem

== 1890s ==
- 1897 - Gunkan kōshinkyoku

== 1900s ==
- 1901 - Kōjō no Tsuki

== 1910s ==
- 1910 - Nipponophone founded
- 1911 - Tokyo Philharmonic Orchestra founded
- 1912 (Meiji 45 / Taishō 1) - First Japanese symphony: Kachidoki to Heiwa by Kōsaku Yamada
- 1914 - Katyusha's Song
- 1915 - Gondola no Uta

== 1920s ==
- 1921 - Inno Meiji by Kōsaku Yamada; Sendō Kouta; Nanatsu no Ko
- 1923 - Omocha No March
- 1926 (Taishō 15 / Shōwa 1)
- 1927 - Akatombo

== 1930s ==
- 1931 - King Records founded
- 1932 - Seki Taneko releases "Akemi no Uta" (あけみの唄), composed by Masao Koga, with lyrics by Hara Asao
- 1934 - Nagauta Symphony
- 1938 - Tabi No Yokaze by Misao Matsubara (alias "Miss Columbia")

== 1940s ==
- 1940 - Kurofune
- 1942 - Japan Phonogram Record Cultural Association founded
- 1943 - Akira Ifukube's Kishi Mai march
- 1945 - Kōhaku Ongaku Shiai
- 1946 - First Mainichi Film Award for Best Music; First broadcast of NHK Nodo Jiman
- 1947 - Osaka Philharmonic Orchestra founded; Shizuko Kasagi released Tokyo Boogie-Woogie; lack of suitable locations for jukeboxes; First Students' Music Concour

== 1950s ==
- 1951 - First Kōhaku Uta Gassen; New Symphony Orchestra became NHK Symphony Orchestra; Toho Symphony Orchestra became Tokyo Symphony Orchestra
- 1952 - First Otaka prize on 26 December
- 1953 - Omoide No Warutsu by Izumi Yukimura
- 1954 - Godzilla includes music by Akira Ifukube
- 1955 - Film musicals include Janken Musume
- 1956 - Japan Philharmonic Orchestra founded
- 1957 - Best selling single: Yūrakuchō de Aimashō by Frank Nagai
- 1958 - 20,000 people attended record festival; First Osaka International Festival of Music, Drama and Arts
- 1959 - 1st Japan Record Awards

== 1960s ==
- 1960 - Sega 1000 jukebox; 5,616 new record releases; Tokyo Kosei Wind Orchestra founded
- 1961 - First broadcast of Minna no Uta; Sapporo Symphony Orchestra founded; 50 record labels from 9 companies
- 1962 - First broadcast of Shichiji ni aimashō; Yomiuri Nippon Symphony Orchestra founded
- 1963 - Sukiyaki reaches number 1 in the USA; estimated 5,000 jukeboxes; 56 million records produced
- 1964 - First broadcast of Music Fair; Third largest record market
- 1965 - Tokyo Metropolitan Symphony Orchestra founded; electric boom (Japanese: エレキブーム, ereki būmu)
- 1966 - Nagoya Philharmonic Orchestra founded
- 1967 - Oricon founded; $96 million records production; Japanese musicians sell more records than foreigners; Hibari Misora released Makkana Taiyō
- 1968 - First broadcast of Yoru no Hit Studio; CBS/Sony founded; First Japan Cable Awards; First soul music festival
- 1969 - First Yamaha Popular Song Contest; 2nd largest record market; Suntory Music Award founded; First broadcast of NTV Kōhaku Uta No Best Ten

== 1970s ==
- 1970 - First World Popular Song Festival; First publication of Music Labo; First Japan Music Awards; approx start of jukebox boom; 11,000 jukeboxes; Kanagawa Philharmonic Orchestra founded;
- 1971 - Debut of Saori Minami, Mari Amachi and Rumiko Koyanagi; Gagaku revival reported
- 1972 - First Tokyo Music Festival; First broadcast of Best 30 Kayōkyoku; Hiroshima Symphony Orchestra founded; New Japan Philharmonic founded;
- 1973 - "Shura No Hana" (Japanese: 修羅の花) by Meiko Kaji; Candies released first single
- 1974 - First FNS Music Festival; Nippon Music Foundation established; debut of Chieko Matsumoto
- 1975 - 44,000 jukeboxes; First Nippon Television Music Festival
- 1976 - Number one singles include Oyoge! Taiyaki-kun and Kita no Yadokara
- 1977 - Debut of Mizue Takada
- 1978 - First broadcast of The Best Ten; Candies Final Carnival concert
- 1979 - Number one singles include Chameleon Army, Young Man (Y.M.C.A.) and Ihojin.

== 1980s ==
- 1980 - Number one singles include Ihojin and I'm in the Mood for Dancing
- 1981 - A Long Vacation
- 1982 - Number one singles include Matsu wa and Second Love
- 1983 - Number one singles include Second Love, ½ no Shinwa, Flashdance... What a Feeling, Kinku and Cat's Eye
- 1984 - Number one singles include Southern Wind, Amaoto wa Chopin no Shirabe, Jukkai (1984) and Kazari ja Nai no yo Namida wa
- 1985 - Number one singles include Meu amor é..., Akaitori Nigeta and Sand Beige (Sabaku e)
- 1986 - First broadcast of Music Station; number one singles include Desire (Jōnetsu), Gypsy Queen, Fin, Jā ne, Otto Chikan!, Osaki ni Shitsurei, Koi wa Question and Aozora no Kakera
- 1987 - Number one singles include No More Renai Gokko, Tango Noir, Katatsumuri Samba, Blonde, Sayonara no Kajitsutachi, Kindan no Telepathy, Nanpasen and Catch Me
- 1988 - Number one singles include Stranger Tonight, Al-Mauj, You're My Only Shinin' Star, Stardust Dream, Tattoo, Fu-ji-tsu, Mermaid, Mugon... Iroppoi and Witches
- 1989 (Shōwa 64 / Heisei 1) - Number one singles include Koi Hitoyo, Ai ga Tomaranai (Turn It Into Love), Rosécolor, Namida wo Misenaide ~Boys Don't Cry~, Liar, Arashi no Sugao, Return to Myself, Diamonds, Sekai de Ichiban Atsui Natsu, Samishii Nettaigyo, Kōsa ni Fukarete and One Night in Heaven (Mayonaka no Angel)

== 1990s ==
- 1990 - Debut of Rumi Shishido; Sherry (pseudonym of Izumi Kato) released OVA song "Kaze No Fantasia" (Japanese: 風のファンタジア)
- 1991 - First Akutagawa Memorial Prize; debut of Mi-Ke
- 1992 - Moonlight Densetsu; debut of Manish
- 1993 - First broadcast of Count Down TV; The Boom released Shima Uta (Original Version)
- 1994 - First broadcast of Hey! Hey! Hey! Music Champ; Seek album
- 1996 - First broadcast of Utaban; debut of dos
- 1997 - First Toru Takemitsu Composition Award
- 1998 - First broadcast of Channel A

== 2000s ==
- 2004 - First broadcast of Bokura no Ongaku; Hitomi o Tojite was annual number 1 single; Utada Hikaru Single Collection Vol. 1 was annual number 1 album
- 2005 - First broadcast of J-Melo
- 2006 - First broadcast of Idoling!!!; First broadcast of Rock Fujiyama
- 2007 in Japanese music
- 2008 in Japanese music
- 2009 in Japanese music

== 2010s ==
- 2010 in Japanese music
- 2011 in Japanese music
- 2012 in Japanese music
- 2013 in Japanese music
- 2014 in Japanese music
- 2015 in Japanese music
- 2016 in Japanese music
- 2017 in Japanese music
- 2018 in Japanese music
- 2019 (Heisei 31 / Reiwa 1)

== 2020s ==
- 2020 in Japanese music
- 2021 in Japanese music
- 2022 in Japanese music
- 2023 in Japanese music
- 2024 in Japanese music
- 2025 in Japanese music
- 2026 in Japanese music

== See also ==
- List of Oricon number-one singles
- List of Oricon number-one albums
- List of best-selling singles in Japan by year
- List of best-selling albums in Japan by year
