= Best II (Akina Nakamori album) =

Compilation album by Akina Nakamori
- Released: December 24, 1988
- Recorded: 1986−1988
- Genre: J-pop
- Length: 41:18
- Language: Japanese
- Label: Warner Pioneer

Akina Nakamori chronology
Femme Fatale (1988)	Best II (1988)	Cruise (1989)

Singles from Best II
- 1. "Nonfiction Ecstasy" Released: 19 June 1986; 2. "Blonde" Released: 3 June 1986; 3. "Nanpasen" Released: 30 September 1987; 4. "Al-Mauj" Released: 27 January 1988; 5. "Tattoo" Released: 18 May 1988; 6. "I Missed the Shock" Released: 1 November 1988

Best II is the fourth compilation album by Japanese singer Akina Nakamori.

== Background ==
The compilation album contains all the singles released between 1986 and 1988: from the single Nonfiction Ecstasy until latest single released in 1988 I Missed The Shock during that time. The singles Nonfiction Ecstasy, Nanpasen, Blonde, Al-Mauj, Tattoo and I Missed The Shock were recorded in the album for first time. A three different album jackets were published in the CD, Vinyl and Cassette Tape.

== Promotion ==
=== Singles ===
Nonfiction Ecstasy is the Nakamori's first and only compact cassette single released on 10 November 1986. The single was released with the limited number of copies. The single debuted at number 1 on Oricon Single Weekly Chart.

Blonde is the eighteenth single released on 3 June 1987. Later, the English version of the single with English lyrics The Look That Kills was recorded in the studio album Cross My Palm. The single debuted at number 1 on Oricon Single Weekly Chart and became the 7th best sold single in 1985. In The Best Ten ranking, it debuted on number 1 and stayed at number 15 in the yearly chart. It has received cable music award in the 20th Japan Cable Awards.

Nanpasen is the nineteenth single released on 30 September 1987. The original song was performed and written by Tokiko Kato in 1984. Tokiko herself sent Nakamori demo tape and asked her to perform this single. After watching celebration of Nakamori's 22nd birthday, Tokiko assumed to herself that the song is suitable for Nakamori to perform. The single debuted at number 1 on Oricon Single Weekly Chart and became the 6th best sold single in 1987 and 81st best sold single in 1988. In The Best Ten ranking, it debuted on number 1 and stayed at number 7 in the 1987 yearly chart and at number 79 in the 1988 yearly chart.

It has received multiple music awards: Gold Award from Pop Category in 17th Ginza Music Festival, Special Award in the 13th National Kayo Music Festival, Best Broadcast Music Award and Broadcast Music Special Federation Award in the 18th Japan Music Awards, Most Requested Singer Award in the 20th Japan Cable Awards, Excellent Star Award and Most Requested Award in the 20th National Cable Broadcasting Award, Best Singing Award in the 16th FNS Music Festival, Gold award and Special public Award in the 29th Japan Record Awards, The Best Single of the Year Award in the 2nd Japan Gold Disc Award.

Al-Mauj is the twentieth single released on 27 January 1988. It's Nakamori's third single with the motive of the oriental sound, which is since Gypsy Queen and Sand Beige. The title comes from the Arabic language and it means "wave". The song was originally recorded by the original composer of the song, Takashi Satō as "Déraciné" (デラシネ, Derashine) on his 1987 album Mizu no Naka no Taiyō (水の中の太陽, lit. Sun in the Water). The title of the song has been changed and as well as lyrics content-from the men point of the view to the women. The single debuted at number 1 on Oricon Single Weekly Chart and became the 14th best sold single in 1988. In The Best Ten ranking, it debuted on number 1 and stayed at number 18 in the yearly chart.

Tattoo is the twenty-first single released on 18 May 1988. The music producer is Anri Sekine from the Eurox, who previously worked on the Nakamori's first self-produce album Fushigi. Nakamori herself wanted to avoid a mini skirt and doesn't like them to wear, however she stated that it suits the atmosphere of this song. In the media it was used as a commercial song to the Orient Watch. The single debuted at number 1 on Oricon Single Weekly Chart and became the 13th best sold single in 1988. In The Best Ten ranking, it debuted on number 1 and stayed at number 9 in the yearly chart.

It has received three music awards: Pops Megalopolis Award and Pops Grand Prix Award in the 7th Megapolis Music Festival, Yomiuri TV Grand Prize in the 21st National Cable Broadcasting Award and Gold Award in the 30th 30th Japan Record Awards.

I Missed The Shock is the twenty-second single released on 1 November 1988. The writer Qumico Fucci worked with Nakamori in the studio album Femme Fatale. Originally, I Missed the Shock was originally to be released B-side song of the early promoted single, Bilitis. The single debuted at number 3 on Oricon Single Weekly Chart and became the 57th best sold single in 1988 and the 53rd best sold single in 1989. In The Best Ten ranking, it debuted on number 3 and stayed at number 39 in the yearly chart.

It has received three music awards: Cable Music Award in the 21st Japan Cable Awards, double awards Best Singing Award and Best Kayo Music Award in the 17th FNS Music Festival and Excellent Star award in the 21st National Cable Broadcasting Award.

== Chart performance ==
It went to No.2 on the Japanese album chart on the week of release and remained at No.1 for two weeks. The album charted for 32 weeks. The album remained at number 4 on the Oricon Album Yearly Charts in 1989.

== Track list ==
No.	Title	Lyrics	Music	Arrangement	Length
1.	"Nonfiction Ecstasy"	Kazuko Sakata	Sakata	Kazuo Shiina	3:32
2.	"Tattoo"	Yuri Moriko	Anri Sekine	Eurox	3:57
3.	"Desire (Jōnetsu)"	Yoko Aki	Kisaburō Suzuki	Shiina	4:24
4.	"Tango Noir"	Kayoko Fuyumori	Takashi Tsushimi	Satoshi Nakamura	4:09
5.	"Blonde"	Biddu; Winston Sella; Keiko Asō	Biddu; Sella	Nakamura	3:53
6.	"I Missed the Shock"	Qumico Fucci	Fucci	Eurox	4:10
7.	"Al-Mauj"	Akira Ootsu	Takashi Satou	Satoshi Takebe	4:08
8.	"Fin"	Ikki Matsumoto	Ken Satou	Jun Satou	4:11
9.	"Gypsy Queen"	Matsumoto	Wataru Kuniyasu	Shingo Kobayashi	4:29
10.	"Nanpasen"	Tokiko Kato	Kato	Kei Wakakusa	4:25
Total length:					41:17

2023 remaster reissue

No.	Title	Lyrics	Music	Arrangement	Length
11.	"Amish" (Āmisshu (清教徒（アーミッシュ）))	Yasushi Akimoto	Toshinobu Kubota	Satoshi Takebe	3:44
12.	"Koiji" ((恋路; "Romance"))	Natsuko Kisugi	Tetsuji Hayashi	Mitsuo Hagita	5:09
13.	"Bara Ichiya" ((薔薇一夜; "One Night of Roses"))	Akira Ōtsu	Kisaburō Suzuki	Kazuo Ōtani	4:43
14.	"Le Poison" (Lu Puazon (小悪魔（ル・プアゾン）))	Keiko Asō	Masatoshi Nishimura	Jun Miyake	3:50
15.	"Bilitis"	Eiko Kyo	Akihiro Yoshimi	Satoshi Takebe	4:20

== Cover versions ==
=== Blonde ===
- Hongkong singer Samantha Lam covered the song in Chinese under title "Shang Xin Xi Yuan" in 1988 released under Hongkong's Sony BMG Music Entertainment recording label.

=== Nanpasen ===
- Anita Mui covered the song in Cantonese as "Wúrén yuàn ài wǒ" (無人願愛我, "No One Wants to Love Me") on her 1988 album Mèng lǐ gòng zuì (夢裡共酔, In the Dream).
- Yolinda Yan covered the song in Cantonese on her 1988 album Wú bàn de wǔ (無伴的舞, Unaccompanied Dance).
- Kaori Momoi covered the song on her 1993 cover album More Standard.
- Tomomi Kahara covered the song on her 2014 cover album Memories 2: Kahara All Time Covers. It was featured in the Takashi Miike film Over Your Dead Body.
- Aya Shimazu covered the song on her 2017 cover album Singer 4.
- Kousuke Atari covered the song on his 2019 album Kanasha.
- Ms. Ooja covered the song on her 2020 cover album Nagashi Ooja: Vintage Song Covers.
- Okayu covered the song on her 2021 cover album Okayu Uta: Cover Songs.
- Crazy Ken Band covered the song on their 2021 cover album Sukinanda yo.
- Fuyumi Sakamoto covered the song on her 2021 cover album Love Emotion.

=== Tattoo ===
- Kiyoharu covered the song on her 2007 single "Tattoo".

=== I Missed The Shock ===
- Qumico Fucci, original composer of the song covered the song on her 1994 album "Kanashii Lion".

=== Tango Noir ===
- Cantonese singer Yolinda Yan covered the song in Cantonese on her 1988 album Wú bàn de wǔ (無伴的舞, Unaccompanied Dance).

== Release history ==
Year	Format(s)	Serial number	Label(s)	Ref.
1988	LP, CT, CD	28L1-49, 28L4-49, 32L2-49	Warner Pioneer	
1989	Gold CD	36L2-5105	Warner Pioneer	
1991	CD	WPCL-427	Warner Pioneer	
2006	CD, digital download	WPCL-10291	Warner Pioneer	
2012	Super Audio CD, CD hybrid	WPCL-11149	Warner Pioneer	
2018	LP, CD	WPJL-10098, WPCL-12905	Warner Pioneer	
2020	LP	BRIDGE-309/10	Bridge Inc.	
2023	2CD, 2CD+CT+2LP, 2LP	WPCL-1352/6, WPZL-32104/8, WPJL-10203/4	Warner Pioneer	

Notes:

- 2006 re-release includes 24-bit digitally remastered sound source
- 2012 and 2014 re-release includes subtitles in the tracks "2012 remaster"
- 2023 re-release includes lacquer remaster which includes subtitles in the tracks "2023 lacquer remaster" along with original karaoke version of the tracks

== See also ==
- 1988 in Japanese music
