= Cruise (Akina Nakamori album) =

Studio album by Akina Nakamori
- Released: 25 July 1989
- Recorded: April 1989
- Studio: The Hit Factory
- Genre: J-pop
- Length: 44:38
- Language: Japanese
- Label: Warner Pioneer

Akina Nakamori chronology
Best II (1988)	Cruise (1989)	Best III (1992)

Singles from Cruise
- 1. "Liar" Released: 25 April 1989

Cruise is the fourteenth studio album by Japanese singer Akina Nakamori. It was released on 25 July 1989 under the Warner Pioneer label. The album includes lead single Liar. It was released after Nakamori's suicide attempt and a fashion book which was released in limited editions.

While Nakamori was still recording in United States, Nakamori herself ditched the abrasive and overproduction of her previous albums such as Stock and Femme Fatale but except for a few tracks such as Ranbi and a newly reissued track Blue On Pink which it features more guitar solos.

Cruise is a ballad album that incorporates genres such as smooth jazz, sophisti-pop, r&b and adult contemporary while most of the lyrical content such as Nakamori disillusioned with love, infidelity and personal relationships which many of her songwriters had interpreted her personal status as well.

After the album was released, it became her most highest charting album for several weeks after Crimson, this was her final studio album with Warner until her return in 2024 before her departure to MCA Victor during hiatus.

== Background ==
Cruise was the final studio album released under the label of Warner Pioneer until she returned in 2024.

The album was recorded at The Hit Factory Studio in New York, 3-4 April 1989. The album content is similar to her previously released studio album Crimson, which has only slow and medium melodies and singing with whisper voice (with the exception of Liar, which in the chorus part she used vibrato).

The title track Akai Fushigi was once used in the earlier published track list of the studio album Fushigi. It's unknown whenever the melody line is same or different during that time.

As well as domestic music writers, several international writers were involved in the recording of Cruise, such as a Brazilian singer-songwriter Osny Mello and British songwriter Nicky Wood.

After the album's release, Nakamori took a one-year hiatus from her music activities and made her comeback in 1990 with the single Dear Friend. However, her hiatus had violated the terms of her contract with Warner Pioneer, resulting in the contract not being renewed. Nakamori's next studio album was therefore not released until 1993, under the MCA Records label.

In 1999, numerous tracks from the album were remixed for inclusion in the limited-edition box set "Collection 1982-1991." In a 2024 reissue of the album, the mixes will be included and available to public for the first time since its release with subtitle Collection 1982-1991 version with the exception of Sayonara ja Owaranai (has a different intro) and Close Your Eyes (Akina's vocals were lowered and the volume of the instruments can be heard clearly).

== Promotion ==
=== Single ===
It consists only one previously released single, Liar. It includes renewed arrangement with the change of a few instrumental sections. The original version of Liar is included in the third Best compilation album series in 1992. It's Nakamori's first album in 4 years which includes at least one leading single, previous studio albums had only new recorded tracks.

== Stage performances ==
In Fuji TV music television program Yoru no Hit Studio, Nakamori performed Liar twice between April and May. In TBS music television program The Best Ten, she performed Liar six times between May and June. In NTV music television program Top Ten she performed it five times between May and June. On 9 July, two days before suicide attempt, she performed it in music television reward program Megapolis Kayou Matsuri.

The single Liar was performed many times during her live performances between 1989 and 2003. For the first time, it was performed during special live East Live Index in April 1989, both live album and live DVD were released later. Ame ga Futteta, Ranka, Close your eyes, Singer and Liar were performed in Nakamori's live Yume 91 Akina Nakamori Special Live in 1991. In the live album Listen to me were recorded more tracks than in the DVD of live Yume 91 Akina Nakamori Special Live. Liar as only song was performed in special live Nakamori Akina True Live in 1995 and All About Akina 20th Anniversary It's Brand New Day in 2000. Rakka and Ame ga Futteta were performed in live tour Nakamori Akina 2000: 21 Seiki he no Tabidachi. Liar and Ranka were in the live tour I hope so in 2003.

== Chart performance ==
The single Liar debuted at number 1 on the Oricon Single Weekly Chart and charted for 20 weeks. The single remained at number 28 on the Oricon Album Yearly Chart in 1989. The single debuted at number 2 on The Best Ten Weekly Chart and kept the same position for consecutive two weeks. The single debuted at number 2 on the Uta no Top Ten Weekly Chart.

The album reached at number 1 on the Oricon Album Weekly Chart and remained in the same position for the three weeks. The other released version debuted at number 1 as well. Vinyl Record version charted 15 weeks, Cassette tape charted 17 weeks and CD version charted 13 weeks. The album remained at number 31 on the Oricon Album Yearly Chart in 1989.

== Track listing ==
No.	Title	Lyrics	Music	Arranger(s)	Length
1.	"Uragiri"	Ikki Matsumoto	Daisuke Inoue	Satoshi Takebe	4:46
2.	"Akai Mystery" (赤い不思議(ミステリー))	Akiko Kosaka	Kosaka	Kazuo Shiina	3:47
3.	"Sayonara ja Owaranai" (さよならじゃ終わらない)	Gorō Matsui	Kōji Tamaki	Takebe	3:42
4.	"Liar"	Mitsuko Shiramine	Kazuya Izumi	Akira Nishihira	4:33
5.	"Ranka" (乱火)	Akira Ootsu	Kisaburō Suzuki	Kōji Makaino	4:28
6.	"Close Your Eyes"	Masako Arikawa	Osny Melo	Satoshi Nakamura	3:37
7.	"Standing in Blue"	Show	Melo	Nakamura	5:32
8.	"Kaze wa Sora no Kanata" (風は空の彼方)	Qumico Fucci	Nick Wood	Nishihira	4:37
9.	"Singer"	Show	Melo	Nakamura	4:30
10.	"Ame ga Futteta..." (雨が降ってた…)	Yuuho Iwasato	Chika Ueda	Kei Wakakusa	5:05

2024 remaster reissue

No.	Title	Lyrics	Music	Arrangement	Length
11.	""Liar" (single version)"	Shiramine	Izumi	Nishihira	4:35
12.	"Blue On Pink"	Yoshiko Miura	Wataru Kuniyasu	Wakakusa	3:42
13.	"Uragiri" (Collection 1982-1991 Version)	Matsumoto	Inoue	Takebe
14.	"Akai Mystery" (Collection 1982-1991 Version)	Kosaka	Kosaka	Shiina
15.	"Standing in Blue" (Collection 1982-1991 Version)	Show	Melo	Nakamura
16.	"Kaze wa Sora no Kanata" (Collection 1982-1991 Version)	Qumico Fucci	Nick Wood	Nishihira
17.	"Singer" (Collection 1982-1991 Version)	Show	Melo	Nakamura

Notes:

- "Uragiri," "Liar," and "Singer" are stylised in all uppercase, whereas "Standing in Blue" is stylized in proper case.

== Covers ==
=== Liar ===
- Japanese singer Rina Ito covered in her 2010 album Hey-Say.

=== Uragiri ===
- Singer-songwriter and original composer of the song, Daisuke Inoue self-covered the track in the studio album "Blue Diamond" released in 1990.

=== Close your eyes ===
- Hong Kong singer Cherrie Choi covered "Close your eyes" in Chinese and released it as a single in the 1990. The single reached number one on the Ultimate Song Chart and remained number one for two weeks.

== Release history ==
Year	Format(s)	Serial number	Label(s)	Ref.
1989	LP, CT, CD	25L1-80, 25L4-80, 29L2-80	Warner Pioneer	
1991	CD	WPCL-428	Warner Pioneer	
2006	CD, digital download	WPCL-10292	Warner Pioneer	
2012	Super Audio CD, CD hybrid	WPCL-11150	Warner Pioneer	
2014	CD	WPCL-11735	Warner Pioneer	
2018	LP	WPJL-10099	Warner Pioneer	
2024	CD, LP	WPCL-13535/6; WPJL-10210	Warner Pioneer	

Note:

- 2006 re-release includes 24-bit digitally remastered sound source
- 2012 and 2014 re-release includes subtitles in the tracks "2012 remaster"
- 2024 re-release includes lacquer remaster which includes subtitles in the tracks "2024 lacquer remaster" along with original karaoke version of the tracks

== See also ==
- 1989 in Japanese music
