= CD'87 =

Greatest hits album by Akina Nakamori
- Released: May 1, 1987
- Recorded: 1986−1987
- Genre: Pop
- Length: 35:41
- Language: Japanese
- Label: Warner Pioneer

Akina Nakamori chronology
Crimson (1986)	CD'87 (1987)	Cross My Palm (1987)

Singles from CD'87
- 1. "Desire (Jōnetsu)" Released: 3 February 1986; 2. "Gypsy Queen" Released: 26 May 1986; 3. "Fin" Released: 25 September 1986; 4. "Tango Noir" Released: 4 February 1987

CD'87 is the third compilation album by Japanese singer Akina Nakamori. It was released on May 1, 1987, under Warner Pioneer. The album includes four singles (her 14th through 17th singles overall) and their corresponding B-sides.

== Background ==
CD'87 was released to celebrate the fifth anniversary of Nakamori's debut. Also around that time, Nakamori was named "Artist of The Year" at the 1st Japan Gold Disc Awards. The album was released only on CD, hence its name.

Cassette-tape only single "Nonfiction Ecstasy" was not included in CD'87 but rather in the following compilation album Best II. Best II would also include CD'87's four singles. In 2023, CD'87 was remastered and reissued, this time including "Nonfiction Ecstasy" as a bonus track.

== Promotion ==
=== Singles ===
"Desire (Jōnetsu)" (originally "Desire," stylized DESIRE) is Nakamori's 14th single, released on February 3, 1986. Desire became her first song to be promoted in a television commercial, for the Pioneer media player Private CD 500AV. The single debuted at number 1 on Oricon Single Weekly Charts and became the second best-selling single in Japan in 1986. In The Best Ten ranking, it debuted at number 1 and stayed there for seven consecutive weeks; in the yearly chart, it ranked at number 2. "Desire (Jōnetsu)" received numerous awards at the 28th Japan Record Awards, the 19th Japan Cable Awards, the 12th Nippon Television Music Festival, the 13th FNS Music Festival, and the 1st Japan Gold Disc Award for "Best Single of Year."

"Gypsy Queen" is Nakamori's 15th single, released on May 26, 1986. The single debuted at number 1 on Oricon Single Weekly Chart and became the seventh best-selling single of 1986. In The Best Ten ranking, it debuted on number 1 and stayed at number 14 in the yearly chart. It received two awards at the 19th Japan Record Sales Award Grand Prize and the 5th Megapolis Kayousai.

"Fin" is Nakamori's 16th single, released on September 25, 1986. In the early announcement of the release of studio album Fushigi, both "Fin" and B-side track "Abunai Mon Amour" were listed as candidates for inclusion but were instead released here. The single debuted at number 1 on Oricon Single Weekly Chart and became the 25th best-selling single of 1986. In The Best Ten ranking, it debuted on number 1 and stayed at number 17 in the yearly chart. It has received several awards: 19th Japan Record Sales Award Grand Prize and 17th Japan Music Awards .

"Tango Noir" is Nakamori's 17th single, released on February 4, 1987. The single debuted at number 1 on Oricon Single Weekly Chart and became the second best-selling single of 1987. In The Best Ten ranking, it debuted on number 1 and stayed at number 18 in the yearly chart. It received "Best Single Of the Year" at the 2nd Japan Gold Disc Awards, as well as awards at the 14th Yokohama Ongakusai and the 20th Nihon Yuusen Housou Taishou.

== Stage performance ==
"La Bohème" is very popular among fans. Nakamori would perform it often during her live tours and on music television programs. "Abunai Mon Amour" has also been performed on various music television programs.

== Chart performance ==
The compilation album debuted at number 1 on the Oricon Weekly Album Charts and remained in the same position for two consecutive weeks. It charted for 17 weeks and sold 159,000 copies.

== Track listing ==
No.	Title	Lyrics	Music	Arrangement	Length
1.	"La Bohème"	Reiko Yukawa	Takashi Tsushimi	Kazuo Shiina	4:42
2.	"Saigo no Carmen"	Keiko Asou	Tsushimi	Satoshi Nakamura	4:31
3.	"Tango Noir"	Kayoko Fuyumori	Tsushimi	Nakamura	4:10
4.	"Desire (Jōnetsu)"	Yoko Aki	Kisaburo Suzuki	Shiina	4:25
5.	"Abunai Mon Amour"	Eiko Kyo	Suzuki	Shiina	4:47
6.	"Milonguita"	Akira Ootsu	Tetsuji Hayashi	Nakamura	4:32
7.	"Gypsy Queen"	Ikki Matsumoto	Wataru Kuniyasu	Shingo Kobayashi	4:30
8.	"Fin"	Matsumoto	Ken Satou	Jun Satou	3:52
Total length:					35:41

2023 remaster reissue
No.	Title	Lyrics	Music	Arrangement	Length
9.	"Nonfiction Ecstasy"	Kazuko Sakata	Sakata	Shiina	3:30
Total length:					39:19

== Release history ==
Year	Format(s)	Serial number	Label(s)	Ref.
1987	CD	32XL-191	Warner Pioneer	
1991	CD	WPCL-422	Warner Pioneer	
2023	CD	WPCL-13491	Warner Pioneer	

Notes:

- 2023 re-release includes lacquer remaster which includes subtitles in the tracks "2023 lacquer remaster" along with original karaoke version of the tracks

== See also ==
- 1987 in Japanese music
