= True Album Akina 95 Best =

Compilation album by Akina Nakamori
- Released: December 6, 1995
- Recorded: 1993–1995
- Studios: Ocean Way Recording; Victor Studio; Aobadai Studio; Freedom Studio; Studio MIT; Studio Jive; Sound Studio Dali; Heartbeat Recording Studio; Sound Valley
- Genres: J-pop; pop rock; dance-pop; rockabilly; kayōkyoku
- Length: 96:18
- Language: Japanese
- Label: MCA Victor
- Producer: Akina Nakamori

Akina Nakamori chronology
La Alteración (1995)	True Album Akina 95 Best (1995)	Vamp (1996)

Singles from True Album Akina 95 Best
- 1. "Tokyo Rose" Released: November 1, 1995

True Album Akina 95 Best is a compilation album by Japanese entertainer and producer Akina Nakamori, released through MCA Victor on December 6, 1995. Produced by Nakamori, the album consists of her singles from the MCA Victor era and self-covers of her singles from the Warner Pioneer era. The album is split in three discs: "Wild Disc" focuses on Nakamori's fast-paced songs, "World Disc" features songs with world music themes, and "Whisper Disc" compiles her ballads.

== Charting performance ==
The album peaked at No. 16 on Oricon's weekly albums chart and charted for seven weeks. It sold over 86,000 copies.

== Track listing ==
Disc 1: Wild Disc
No.	Title	Lyrics	Music	Arrangement	Length
1.	"Kazari ja Nai no yo Namida wa [Renewal]" ((飾りじゃないのよ涙は; "The Tears Are Not a Decoration"))	Yōsui Inoue	Y. Inoue	Kōichi Korenaga	4:22
2.	"Tokyo Rose"	Akina Nakamori; Takashi Kamisawatsu	Masaki	Brian Setzer	4:09
3.	"Tattoo [Renewal]"	Yuri Moriko	Anri Sekine	Korenaga	4:02
4.	"Gaia (Chikyū no Sasayaki)" ((Gaia 〜地球のささやき〜; "Gaia ~Whisper of the Earth~"))	Seriko Natsuno	Nittoku Inoue	Shōhei Narabe	3:18
5.	"Blonde [Renewal]"	Biddu; Winston Sela; Keiko Asō	Biddu; Sela	Nobuhiko Kashiwara	3:58
6.	"Aibu" ((愛撫; "Caress"))	Takashi Matsumoto	Tetsuya Komuro	Komuro	5:12
7.	"Desire (Jōnetsu) [Renewal]" (DESIRE -情熱-)	Yoko Aki	Kisaburō Suzuki	Yasunori Iwasaki	4:39
Total length:					29:40

Disc 2: World Disc
No.	Title	Lyrics	Music	Arrangement	Length
1.	"Meu amor é... [Renewal]" (Mi Amōre (ミ・アモーレ))	Chinfa Kan	Naoya Matsuoka	Ikurō Fujiwara	4:24
2.	"Gypsy Queen [Renewal]" (Jipushī Kuīn (ジプシー・クイーン))	Matsumoto	Wataru Kuniyasu	Minoru Mukaiya	4:20
3.	"Genshi, Onna wa Taiyō Datta" ((原始、女は太陽だった; "Primitive, the Woman Was the Sun"))	Neko Oikawa	Masaki	Iwasaki	4:47
4.	"Tango Noir [Renewal]"	Kayoko Fuyumori	Takashi Tsushimi	Fujiwara	4:33
5.	"Gekka" ((月華; "Moon Flower"))	Gorō Matsui	Shūgō Kajiwara	Akihiko Matsumoto	5:01
6.	"Futari Shizuka: Tenkawa Densetsu Satsujin Jiken yori [Renewal]" ((二人静 -「天河伝説殺人事件」より; "Two People Still: From The Legendary Tenkawa Murder Case"))	T. Matsumoto	Makoto Sekiguchi	Mukaiya	4:06
7.	"Shangrila [Bonus Track]"	Natsuno	Iwasaki	Iwasaki	5:37
Total length:					32:48

Disc 3: Whisper Disc
No.	Title	Lyrics	Music	Arrangement	Length
1.	"Slow Motion [Renewal]" (Surō Mōshon (スローモーション))	Etsuko Kisugi	Takao Kisugi	Fujiwara	5:14
2.	"Second Love [Renewal]" (Sekando Rabu (セカンド・ラブ))	E. Kisugi	T. Kisugi	Iwasaki	5:03
3.	"Liar [Renewal]"	Mitsuko Shiramine	Kazuya Izumi	Mukaiya	4:55
4.	"Kagerō" ((陽炎; "Heat Haze"))	Nakamori	Kōji Tamaki	Yūji Toriyama	4:20
5.	"Nanpasen [Renewal]" ((難破船; "Shipwreck"))	Tokiko Kato	Kato	Masahiro Sayama	4:08
6.	"Mizu ni Sashita Hana [Renewal]" ((水に挿した花; "Flowers in Water"))	Natsuko Tadano	Junko Hirotani	Fujiwara	5:15
7.	"Yokan [Renewal]" ((予感; "Premonition"))	Ryō Asuka	Asuka	Kashiwara	4:55
Total length:					33:50

== Charts ==
Chart (1995)	Peak position
Japanese Albums (Oricon)	16
