= List of Oricon number-one singles of 1988 =

The highest-selling singles in Japan are ranked in the Oricon Singles Chart, which in 1988 was published in what was then called Oricon Weekly magazine. The data are compiled by Oricon based on each singles' physical sales. This list includes the singles that reached the number one place on that chart in 1988.

== Oricon Weekly Singles Chart ==
Issue date	Song	Artist(s)	Ref.
January 4	"Glass no Jūdai"	Hikaru Genji	
January 11	"Glass no Jūdai"	Hikaru Genji	
January 18	"Glass no Jūdai"	Hikaru Genji	
January 25	"Kaze no Lonely Way"	Kiyotaka Sugiyama	
February 1	"Stranger Tonight"	Yoko Oginome	
February 8	"Al-Mauj"	Akina Nakamori	
February 15	"Al-Mauj"	Akina Nakamori	
February 22	"Kanpai"	Tsuyoshi Nagabuchi	
February 29	"You're My Only Shinin' Star"	Miho Nakayama	
March 7	"Toiki de Net"	Yoko Minamino	
March 14	"Toiki de Net"	Yoko Minamino	
March 21	"Paradise Ginga"	Hikaru Genji	
March 28	"Paradise Ginga"	Hikaru Genji	
April 4	"Paradise Ginga"	Hikaru Genji	
April 11	"Paradise Ginga"	Hikaru Genji	
April 18	"Paradise Ginga"	Hikaru Genji	
April 25	"Marrakech"	Seiko Matsuda	
May 2	"C-GIRL"	Yui Asaka	
May 9	"Stardust Dream"	Yoko Oginome	
May 16	"C-GIRL"	Yui Asaka	
May 23	"C-GIRL"	Yui Asaka	
May 30	"Tattoo"	Akina Nakamori	
June 6	"Tattoo"	Akina Nakamori	
June 13	"Fu-ji-tsu"	Shizuka Kudo	
June 20	"Fu-ji-tsu"	Shizuka Kudo	
June 27	"Anata o Aishitai"	Yoko Minamino	
July 4	"Diamond Hurricane"	Hikaru Genji	
July 11	"Diamond Hurricane"	Hikaru Genji	
July 18	"What's your name?"	Shonentai	
July 25	"Mermaid"	Miho Nakayama	
August 1	"Angel"	Kyosuke Himuro	
August 8	"Angel"	Kyosuke Himuro	
August 15	"Angel"	Kyosuke Himuro	
August 22	"Angel"	Kyosuke Himuro	
August 29	"Cecil"	Yui Asaka	
September 5	"Daybreak"	Otokogumi	
September 12	"Daybreak"	Otokogumi	
September 19	"Tabidachi wa Freesia"	Seiko Matsuda	
September 26	"Daybreak"	Otokogumi	
October 3	"Mugon... Iroppoi"	Shizuka Kudo	
October 10	"Mugon... Iroppoi"	Shizuka Kudo	
October 17	"Aki kara mo, Soba ni Ite"	Yoko Minamino	
October 24	"Tsurugi no Mai"	Hikaru Genji	
October 31	"Tsurugi no Mai"	Hikaru Genji	
November 7	"Tonbo"	Tsuyoshi Nagabuchi	
November 14	"Tonbo"	Tsuyoshi Nagabuchi	
November 21	"Jirettai ne"	Shonentai	
November 28	"Witches"	Miho Nakayama	
December 5	"Tonbo"	Tsuyoshi Nagabuchi	
December 12	"Tonbo"	Tsuyoshi Nagabuchi	
December 19	"Tonbo"	Tsuyoshi Nagabuchi	
December 26	"Tonbo"	Tsuyoshi Nagabuchi	

== See also ==
- 1988 in Japanese music
