= Akina Nakamori videography =

Japanese entertainer Akina Nakamori has released 18 concert tour videos and 5 music video compilation.

== Video albums ==
=== Concert tour videos ===
Title	Release details
Bitter and Sweet 1985 Summer Tour	Released: December 10, 1985; Label: Warner; Formats: VHS · Betamax · LD · LD single · DVD · Blu-ray
Akina East Live: Index-XXIII	Released: November 28, 1988; Label: Warner; Formats: VHS · LD · DVD · Blu-ray
Yume '91: Akina Nakamori Special Live	Released: July 25, 1991; Label: Warner; Formats: VHS · LD · DVD · Blu-ray
Live in '87: A Hundred Days	Released: August 25, 1993; Label: Warner; Formats: VHS · LD · DVD · Blu-ray
Live in '88: Femme Fatale	Released: August 25, 1993; Label: Warner; Formats: VHS · LD · DVD · Blu-ray
Utahime: Akina Nakamori Parco Theater Live	Released: March 24, 1995; Label: MCA · Universal; Formats: VHS · LD · DVD
Felicidad: Akina Nakamori Live '97	Released: September 22, 1997; Label: Victor · Universal; Formats: VHS · LD · DVD
Akina Nakamori 2001 20th Anniversary Live: It's Brand New Day	Released: September 27, 2001; Label: Tokuma Japan; Formats: VHS · DVD
Akina Nakamori Musica Fiesta Tour 2002	Released: December 4, 2002; Label: Universal; Formats: VHS · DVD
Live Tour 2003: I Hope So	Released: December 17, 2003; Label: Universal; Formats: DVD
Akina Nakamori Special Live 2005 Empress at Club eX	Released: January 11, 2006; Label: Avex; Formats: DVD
Live Tour 2006: The Last Destination	Released: January 17, 2007; Label: Universal; Formats: DVD
Akina Nakamori Special Live 2009: Empress at Yokohama	Released: August 18, 2010; Label: Universal; Formats: DVD
Fanclub Live: Aldea Bar at Tokyo 2024	Released: May 1, 2025; Label: Warner; Formats: Blu-ray · DVD

=== Music video compilations ===
Title	Release details
New Akina Étranger Akina Nakamori in Europe	Released: October 12, 1983; Label: Warner; Formats: VHS · Betamax · LD · 8mm · DVD
Hajimemashite Akina Nakamori	Released: May 1, 1985; Label: Warner; Formats: VHS · Betamax · LD · DVD
Cross My Palm	Released: December 21, 1987; Label: Warner; Formats: VHS · Betamax · LD · DVD
Apasionado	Released: July 10, 2002; Label: Universal; Formats: VHS · DVD
Clip 2002-2007 and More	Released: July 29, 2009; Label: Universal; Formats: DVD
Akina Nakamori in Yoru no Hit Studio	Released: December 22, 2010; Label: Universal; Formats: 6-DVD
The Best Ten Akina Nakamori Premium Box	Released: February 29, 2012; Label: Universal; Formats: 5-DVD
Premier Box Locus: Kōhaku Uta Gassen to Rettsugōyangu etc	Released: September 30, 2015; Label: Universal; Formats: 4-DVD

=== Box sets ===
Title	Release details
5.1 Audio Remaster DVD Collection	Contains: Live in '87 A Hundred Days, Live in '88 Femme Fatale, Yume '91 Akina Nakamori Special Live, Bitter and Sweet 1985 Summer Tour and Akina East Live Index-XXIII; Released: January 24, 2007; Label: Warner; Formats: 5-DVD
DVD Collection 2	Contains: New Akina Étranger Akina Nakamori in Europe, Hajimemashite Akina Nakamori and Cross My Palm; Released: September 5, 2007; Label: Warner; Formats: 3-DVD
The Live DVD Complete Box	Contains: Utahime: Akina Nakamori Parco Theater Live, True Live, Felicidad: Akina Nakamori Live '97, Nijūichi seiki eno tabidachi, Live Tour 2003: I Hope So, Live Tour 2006: The Last Destination and Akina Nakamori Special Live 2009: Empress at Yokohama; Released: May 4, 2016; Label: Universal; Formats: 7-DVD

== Filmography ==
Year	Title	Role	Notes	Ref.
1985	Ai Tabidachi	Yuki Koizumi		
1992	Hashire Melos!	Raisa	Voice role	

== Television ==
Year	Title	Role	Notes
1984	Hashire Seishun 42.195km: Namida to Ase no Marathon Yaō		
1987	Triangle Blues Special II	Akina	
1987	Ningen Kōsaten	Aya Kashima	Episode: "Best Friend"
1988	Akina Nakamori no Spaghetti Monogatari	Ayumi Nomura	
1989	Kisetsuhazure no Kaigan Monogatari: Sunahama no Destiny	Akina	
1989	Otoko Zanmai Onna Zanmai	Shopper	
1991	Yonimo Kimyō na Monogatari	Reiko Kubota	Episode: "Sayonara 6 Nen 2 Kumi"
1991	Mō Ichido Aitai...Wasurerarenai Koibito	Megumi Majima	
1991	Akujo A/B	Kasumi Mamiya; Shinko Kunimoto (Double role)	
1991	10 Nen Me no Christmas: Aishiteru to Watashi kara!	Misuzu Mugita	
1992	Sugao no Mama de	Kanna Tsukishima	
1993	Akujo II: Saint-Émilion Satsujin Jiken	Reiko Hida	
1993	Chance!	Kanna Tsukishima	Episode: "Happy End"; Cameo appearance
1993	Zakennayo! 5	Katsuko Morioka	Episode: "Ippanshoku OL no Hiai"
1993	Hitomi ni Hoshi na Onna tachi	Kaoru Endō	
1994-1996	Furuhata Ninzaburō	Chinami Koishikawa	Episode: "Shisha kara no Dengon" and "Kieta Furuhata Ninzaburō"
1996	Koi Monogatari: Setsunai Yoru wa Aitakute...	Michiko Nakahara	Episode: "Henshin Ganbō"
1998	Tsumetai Tsuki	Kiyoka Shiina	
1998	7 Nin no OL Sommelier	Mai Nanbara	
1999	Border: Hanzai Shinri Sōsa File	Kirie Sugishima	
2006	Primadam	Ranko Kurahashi	

== Commercials ==
Year	Company	Promoting
1982	Akashi School Uniform Company	Fuji Yacht School Uniform
1982	Canon	Mini Copier
1982	Canon	Canon Fax Mini
1983	Kao Corporation	Essential Cuticle Care Shampoo
1985	Pioneer Corporation	Private CD
1986	Canon	Family Copier
1986	Meiji	Meiji Milk Chocolate
1987	Meiji	Meiji Chocolate Lucky
1988	Orient Watch	You
1988	Pioneer Corporation	Private A5
1988	Meiji	Meiji Chocolate Almond
1988	Japan Tobacco	Mild Seven FK
1994	Bull-Dog Sauce	Tokyo no Okonomi Sauce
2001	Fancl	Fancl Aojiru
2003	Procter & Gamble	Nazo no Shampoo
2006	Daiichi Shokai	CR Akina Nakamori: Utahime Densetsu
2010	Daiichi Shokai	Tokimeki Pachinko CR Akina Nakamori: Koi mo Nidome nara

== See also ==
- Akina Nakamori singles discography
- Akina Nakamori albums discography
- List of best-selling music artists in Japan
