= 1988 in Japanese music =

In 1988 (Shōwa 63), Japanese music was released on records, and there were charts, awards, contests and festivals.

During that year, Japan continued to have the second largest music market in the world.

== Awards, contests and festivals ==
The 30th Osaka International Festival (Japanese: 大阪国際フェスティバル) was held from 5 April to 8 May 1988. The 17th Tokyo Music Festival was held in May and June 1988. The 2nd Teens' Music Festival was held on 5 August 1988. The 30th Japan Record Awards were held on 31 December 1988. The 39th NHK Kōhaku Uta Gassen was held on 31 December 1988. The 17th FNS Music Festival was held in 1988.

The 37th Otaka prize was won by Toshio Hosokawa and Toshi Ichiyanagi.

Rebecca won the grand prix for Japanese artist of the year at the 2nd Japan Gold Disc Awards.

The 19th World Popular Song Festival was scheduled for 1988 but was cancelled. The 2nd "Band Explosion" festival was scheduled for 1988 but was cancelled and held in February 1989 instead.

== Live music ==
Club Citta was established.

== Number one singles ==
Oricon

The following reached number 1 on the weekly Oricon Singles Chart:

Issue date	Song	Artist(s)
4 January	"Glass no Jūdai"	Hikaru Genji
11 January	"Glass no Jūdai"	Hikaru Genji
18 January	"Glass no Jūdai"	Hikaru Genji
25 January	"Kaze no Lonely Way"	Kiyotaka Sugiyama
1 February	"Stranger Tonight"	Yoko Oginome
8 February	"Al-Mauj"	Akina Nakamori
15 February	"Al-Mauj"	Akina Nakamori
22 February	"Kanpai"	Tsuyoshi Nagabuchi
29 February	"You're My Only Shinin' Star"	Miho Nakayama
7 March	"Toiki de Net"	Yoko Minamino
14 March	"Toiki de Net"	Yoko Minamino
21 March	"Paradise Ginga"	Hikaru Genji
28 March	"Paradise Ginga"	Hikaru Genji
4 April	"Paradise Ginga"	Hikaru Genji
11 April	"Paradise Ginga"	Hikaru Genji
18 April	"Paradise Ginga"	Hikaru Genji
25 April	"Marrakech"	Seiko Matsuda
2 May	"C-GIRL"	Yui Asaka
9 May	"Stardust Dream"	Yoko Oginome
16 May	"C-GIRL"	Yui Asaka
23 May	"C-GIRL"	Yui Asaka
30 May	"Tattoo"	Akina Nakamori
6 June	"Tattoo"	Akina Nakamori
13 June	"Fu-ji-tsu"	Shizuka Kudo
20 June	"Fu-ji-tsu"	Shizuka Kudo
27 June	"Anata o Aishitai"	Yoko Minamino
4 July	"Diamond Hurricane"	Hikaru Genji
11 July	"Diamond Hurricane"	Hikaru Genji
18 July	"What's your name?"	Shonentai
25 July	"Mermaid"	Miho Nakayama
1 August	"Angel"	Kyosuke Himuro
8 August	"Angel"	Kyosuke Himuro
15 August	"Angel"	Kyosuke Himuro
22 August	"Angel"	Kyosuke Himuro
29 August	"Cecil"	Yui Asaka
5 September	"Daybreak"	Otokogumi
12 September	"Daybreak"	Otokogumi
19 September	"Tabidachi wa Freesia"	Seiko Matsuda
26 September	"Daybreak"	Otokogumi
3 October	"Mugon... Iroppoi"	Shizuka Kudo
10 October	"Mugon... Iroppoi"	Shizuka Kudo
17 October	"Aki kara mo, Soba ni Ite"	Yoko Minamino
24 October	"Tsurugi no Mai"	Hikaru Genji
31 October	"Tsurugi no Mai"	Hikaru Genji
7 November	"Tonbo"	Tsuyoshi Nagabuchi
14 November	"Tonbo"	Tsuyoshi Nagabuchi
21 November	"Jirettai ne"	Shonentai
28 November	"Witches"	Miho Nakayama
5 December	"Tonbo"	Tsuyoshi Nagabuchi
12 December	"Tonbo"	Tsuyoshi Nagabuchi
19 December	"Tonbo"	Tsuyoshi Nagabuchi
26 December	"Tonbo"	Tsuyoshi Nagabuchi

== Number one albums ==
Music Labo

The following reached number 1 on the Music Labo chart:

- 4 January: Kona Weather - Kiyotaka Sugiyama
- 11 January, 18 January, 1 February and 8 February: Hikaru Genji - Hikaru Genji
- 25 January: Before The Diamond Dust Fades - Yumi Matsutoya
- 15 February: Moral - Boøwy
- 22 February and 29 February: Catch the Nite - Miho Nakayama
- 7 March: Best of Shonentai - Shonentai
- 14 March: Stock - Akina Nakamori
- 21 March: Never Change - Tsuyoshi Nagabuchi
- 28 March: Father's Son - Shōgo Hamada
- 11 April: Nanno Singles - Yoko Minamino
- 18 April: Down Town Mystery - Carlos Toshiki & Omega Tribe
- 25 April: Tsuki Ni Nureta Futari - Anzen Chitai
- 2 May: Heartland - Motoharu Sano with The Heartland
- 9 May: Edge of Time - Junichi Inagaki
- 16 May: Last Gigs - Boøwy
- 23 May: Citron - Seiko Matsuda
- 30 May: Beach Time - Tubu
- 6 June, 13 June and 27 June: Ribbon - Misato Watanabe
- 20 June: Playzone '88 - Shonentai
- 4 July: Bewith - Miki Imai
- 11 July: Soleil - Takako Okamura
- 18 July and 25 July: Keisuke Kuwata - Keisuke Kuwata
- 1 August: Screw - The Checkers
- 8 August and 15 August: Hi! - Hikaru Genji
- 22 August: Femme Fatale - Akina Nakamori
- 29 August: Covers - RC Succession
- 5 September: CD-Rider - Yōko Oginome
- 12 September, 19 September and 26 September: Flowers for Algernon - Kyosuke Himuro
- 3 October: Go Funk - Kome Kome Club
- 17 October and 24 October: Such a Funky Thang! - Toshinobu Kubota
- 31 October, 7 November, 14 November and 21 November: Bokuno Nakano Shonen - Tatsuro Yamashita
- 28 November: Goodbye Girl - Miyuki Nakajima
- 5 December, 12 December and 20 December: Delight Slight Light Kiss - Yumi Matsutoya
- 27 December: Best II - Akina Nakamori

Oricon

The following reached number 1 on the Oricon Albums Chart:

- 11 July: Soleil - Takako Okamura
- 18 July: Keisuke Kuwata - Keisuke Kuwata
- 1 August: Shizuka - Shizuka Kudo
- 15 August: Olive - Rebecca
- 19 December: Carol: A Day in a Girl's Life - TM Network

== Annual charts ==
Hikaru Genji's Paradise Ginga was number 1 in the Oricon annual singles chart.

== Film and television ==
The music of Rock yo shizukani nagareyo, by Hiroaki Yoshino, won the 43rd Mainichi Film Award for Best Music. The music of Tsubaki-hime (La Traviata) and Yūshun, both by Shigeaki Saegusa, won the 12th Japan Academy Film Prize for Best Music (awarded in 1989). The music of Akira is by Shoji Yamashiro, and the album is Symphonic Suite Akira by Geinoh Yamashirogumi. The music of the Dominion OVA is by Yoichiro Yoshikawa, and includes the song "Hey Boy". The music of The Last Emperor, by Ryuichi Sakamoto and others, won the Academy Award for Best Original Score at the 60th Academy Awards, which were held in 1988.

== Other singles released ==
- "I Missed the Shock" by Akina Nakamori
- "Blue Hearts Theme" and "Train-Train" by The Blue Hearts
- "Just One More Kiss" by Buck-Tick
- "Dakara Sono Te o Hanashite" by B'z
- "Get Smile", "The Mi-ha" and "Alone" by Chisato Moritaka
- "Saigo no Iiwake" by Hideaki Tokunaga
- "Heart and Soul" by Mari Hamada
- "Daite Kuretara Ii no ni" and "Koi Hitoyo" by Shizuka Kudo
- "Beyond the Time" by TM Network
- "Amaryllis" and "Ai ga Tomaranai (Turn It Into Love)" by Wink
- "Dear (Cobalt no Kanata e)" by Yōko Oginome
- 24 February: "Ai Wa Kokoro No Shigotodesu" (Japanese: 愛は心の仕事です) by Ra Mu

== Other albums and EPs released ==
- Wonder by Akina Nakamori
- Gypsy Ways by Anthem
- Train-Train by The Blue Hearts
- Seventh Heaven and Romanesque by Buck-Tick
- B'z by B'z
- Euphony and Casiopea World Live '88 by Casiopea
- Mi-ha and Mite by Chisato Moritaka
- Shámbara by Dead End
- Jealousy by Loudness
- Love Never Turns Against and Heart and Soul: The Singles by Mari Hamada
- Mind Game, Makin' Dancin' and Angel Hearts by Miho Nakayama
- Miyuki Nakajima by Miyuki Nakajima
- Lovely Times: Noriko Part III by Noriko Sakai
- Bellissima! by Pizzicato Five
- Here We Are and Let's Get Crazy by Princess Princess
- Mysterious and Gradation by Shizuka Kudo
- Turn Over, Glamour and White by Show-Ya
- Yes, No by T-Square
- Moonlight Serenade and At Heel Diamonds by Wink
- Vanishing Vision by X Japan
- Verge of Love by Yōko Oginome

== See also ==
- Timeline of Japanese music
- 1988 in Japan
- 1988 in music
- w:ja:1988年の音楽
