= Lovely Times: Noriko Part III =

1988 album by Noriko Sakai

Studio album by Noriko Sakai
- Released: 21 August 1988
- Recorded: 1988
- Genre: J-pop
- Length: 39:26
- Language: Japanese
- Label: Victor

Noriko Sakai chronology
Guanbare: Noriko Part II (1988)	Lovely Times: Noriko Part III (1988)	Blue Wind: Noriko Part IV (1989)

Singles from Lovely Times: Noriko Part III
- 1. "Ichioku no Smile (Please Your Smile)" Released: 18 May 1988

Lovely Times: Noriko Part III is the fourth studio album by Japanese entertainer Noriko Sakai. Released through Victor Entertainment on 21 August 1988, the album features the single "Ichioku no Smile (Please Your Smile)". In addition, the songs "Try Again...!" and "Active Heart" were used as the ending and opening themes, respectively, of the 1988 anime OVA series Gunbuster. Chage and Aska were involved in the album's songwriting process. The album cover was shot in London as part of Sakai's photo book Lovely Times: Noriko Sakai in Europe.

The album peaked at No. 8 on Oricon's albums chart.

== Track listing ==
All music is arranged by Motoki Funayama, except where indicated.

Side A
No.	Title	Lyrics	Music	Arrangement	Length
1.	"Beat Parade" (Bīto Parēdo (ビート・パレード))	Hiromi Mori	Eiji Nishiki	Kenji Yamamoto	4:01
2.	"Try Again...!" (Torai Agein...! (トライ Again…!))	Megumi Ogura	Nishiki		3:29
3.	"Wink ni Somete" (Uinku ni Somete (ウィンクに染めて; "Dyed in Wink"))	Kazuko Matsumoto	Chage		4:06
4.	"Pop ni Ikou yo" ((POPにいこうよ; "Let's Go to Pop"))	Mori	Nishiki	Yamamoto	4:25
5.	"Listen to Me"	Ryō Asuka	Asuka	Tomoji Sogawa	3:49

Side B
No.	Title	Lyrics	Music	Length
1.	"Fight!" (Faito! (ファイト!))	Asuka	Asuka	4:00
2.	"Active Heart" (Akutibu Hāto (アクティブ・ハート))	Mori	Nishiki	3:23
3.	"Stardust Wave"	Mori	Nishiki	3:55
4.	"1 Page no August" (Ichi Pēji no Ōgasuto (1ページのAugust; "August on Page 1"))	Matsumoto	Chage	4:26
5.	"Ichioku no Smile (Please Your Smile)" (Ichioku no Sumairu (1億のスマイル － PLEASE YOUR SMILE －; "One Hundred Million Smiles - Please Your Smile -"))	Mori	Asuka	3:52

== Charts ==
Chart (1988)	Peak position
Japanese Albums (Oricon)	8

== See also ==
- 1988 in Japanese music
