= Risa Tachibana =

Japanese idol

Risa Tachibana 立花理佐
- Born: October 19, 1971 (age 54); Nishinari-ku, Osaka, Japan
- Origin: Japan
- Occupations: Singer, actress
- Instrument: Singing
- Years active: 1986–2004, 2014–present

Risa Tachibana (立花理佐, Tachibana Risa) (born October 19, 1971) is a former Japanese idol. She is featured in the video game Risa no Yōsei Densetsu.

== Filmography ==
Film	Year	Role	Note
Maido osawagase shimasu 3	1987	Haruka Utsumi	
Don-matsugoro no daiboken	1988		
Bee Bop highschool: Koko yotaro ondo	1988	Shoko Kisaragi	
Crazy Boys	1988	Kanako Harada	
Bee Bop highschool: Koko yotaro kanketsu-hen	1988	Shoko Kisaragi	
Dai Chûshingura	1989	Okiyo	TV series
Hotaru	1989	Natsuko	
Kaze no kuni	1991		
Toppuu! Minipato tai – Aikyacchi Jankushon	1991		

Preceded by Shonentai	Japan Record Award for Best New Artist; 1987	Succeeded by Otokogumi
