= Crimson (Akina Nakamori album) =

Studio album by Akina Nakamori
- Released: 24 December 1986
- Recorded: July 1986
- Genres: Pop; synth-pop; electronic
- Length: 44:38
- Language: Japanese
- Label: Warner Pioneer

Akina Nakamori chronology
Fushigi (1986)	Crimson (1986)	CD'87 (1987)

Crimson is the tenth studio album by Japanese singer Akina Nakamori. It was released on 24 December 1986 under the Warner Pioneer label. The album includes the original version of Eki.

It was her first album to work with mostly female songwriters such as Mariya Takeuchi and Akiko Kobayashi who primarily composed of this album.

Four months after the release of Fushigi which was subtly experimental and eccentric, Nakamori returned to a conventional sound except with the experimentation of Mick Jagger Ni Hohoemio that was experimented with sound effects such as typewriting, stirring and playing an cassette tape, also Nakamori sings in a quieter, whispering tone as usually she vocalized herself with the use of falsetto.

Crimson was considered by critics it as a essential city pop album and becoming her most commercially successful album at that time. Oh No Oh Yes was becoming viral a few decades later, due to the rise of vaporwave genre and V of BTS has streamed this song during a live streamed event which Jungkook recommended, it became Nakamori's best known songs.

== Background ==
Crimson is Nakamori's second studio album released in 1986, just four months after the release of her previous studio album Fushigi. The music production team consists of two writers: Mariya Takeuchi, Akiko Kobayashi and two arrangers, Shiro Sagisu and Kazuo Shiina.

The album consist of any previously released single and includes recordings of 10 new songs. Nakamori sings with whisper or silent voice, which is not usual for the people who know her as a singer with a powerful vibrato. Each of the songs has balladic melody line, in the comparison with her previous studio album Fushigi.

Eki is one of her the most famous album tracks, however the song became more famous after Mariya Takeuchi's cover, which was released in 1987 as a B-side track for the single After Years. Takeuchi's version was used as a theme song in the movie Good-bye, Mama. In this album, arrange is provided by Shiina, while Takeuchi's version arrangement is provided by Tatsuro Yamashita. In 2002, Nakamori self-cover this song in her first self-cover album Utahime Double Decade with arrangement by Akira Senju.

Mick Jagger ni Hohoemi wo's sound effect idea was made by Nakamori herself, imagining herself in room, preparing breakfast and play from cassette tape player her own songs. The original version of Mick Jagger ni Hohoemi wo is included in the CD-Box Akina released in 1993 and in the remastered version of the album released in 2023.

== Stage performances ==
During Fuji TV's music television program Yoru no Hit Studio, Nakamori performed Mick Jagger ni Hohoemi wo, Yakusoku and Oh No, Oh Yes in 1987 and Eki in 1993 as part of the Request songs by viewers segment.

Mind Game, Mosaic no Shiro, Akai no Enamel, Pink Champagne and Jealous Candle were performed on Nakamori's live tour called A Hundred Days.

== Chart performance ==
The album reached number 1 on the Oricon Album Weekly Charts. LP Record version charted 23 weeks, Cassette tape charted 22 weeks and CD version charted 21 weeks. The album remained at number 3 on the Oricon Album Yearly Charts in 1987. As result, in the December 1987 it was nominated in 29th Japan Record Awards and won title The Album of the Year.

== Track listing ==
No.	Title	Lyrics	Music	Arranger(s)	Length
1.	"Mind Game"	Eiko Kyo	Akiko Kobayashi	Shiro Sagisu	4:59
2.	"Eki"	Mariya Takeuchi	Takeuchi	Kazuo Shiina	5:00
3.	"Yakusoku"	Takeuchi	Takeuchi	Shiina	4:05
4.	"Pink Champagne"	Yoshiko Miura	Kobayashi	Sagisu	4:04
5.	"Oh No, Oh Yes!"	Takeuchi	Takeuchi	Shiina	4:48
6.	"Exotica"	Reiko Yukawa	Kobayashi	Sagisu	4:50
7.	"Mosaic no Shiro"	Fumiko	Kobayashi	Sagisu	3:59
8.	"Jealous Candle"	Yumi Yoshimoto	Kobayashi	Sagisu	3:53
9.	"Aka no Enamel"	Takeuchi	Takeuchi	Shiina	4:23
10.	"Mick Jagger ni Hohoemi wo"	Takeuchi	Takeuchi	Shiina	4:41

2023 remaster reissue
No.	Title	Lyrics	Music	Arranger(s)	Length
11.	"Mick Jagger ni Hohoemi wo" (No SE version)	Takeuchi	Takeuchi	Shiina	2:47

Notes:

- "Mind Game," "Oh No, Oh Yes!" and "Jealous Candle" are stylised in all uppercase.
- "Mick Jagger ni Hohoemi wo" begins with an excerpt of "Aka no Enamel."

== Covers ==
=== Mariya Takeuchi covers version ===
Mariya Takeuchi covered all five songs she wrote for Nakamori.

- Eki was released at first in the single After years as a b-side track, later in her compilation albums Impression and Expression.
- Oh No, Oh Yes! was released at first in the single Genki o Dashite as a B-side track and later in the studio album Request.
- Yakusoku was released as a b-side track of single Junai Rhapsody and later in first limited edition of studio album Denim.
- Aka no Enamel was included in the reprinted version of studio album Variety in 2014 as a demo-tape
- Mick Jagger ni Hohoemi wo was included in the compilation album Mariya's Songsbook as a demo-tape as well.

=== Cover versions by other artist ===
==== Oh No Oh Yes ====
- Anita Mui: 似火探戈 (Tsi Fo Taam Gwo), 1987

==== Eki ====
- Anita Mui: 似火探戈 (Tsi Fo Taam Gwo), 1987
- Kenichi Mikawa: Golden Paradise, 1991
- Yuko Nakazawa: Nakazawa Yuuko Dai 1 Shou, 1998
- Hideaki Tokunaga: Vocalist, 2005
- Ryoko Moriyama: Haru Natsu Aki Fuyu, 2008
- Marty Friedman: Tokyo Jukebox, 2009
- Akira Fuse: Ballade II, 2010
- Juju: Snack JUJU: Yoru no Request, 2016

== Sales and certifications ==
Region	Certification	Certified units/sales
Hong Kong (IFPI Hong Kong)	Platinum	20,000^{*}
Japan	—	600,000
^{*} Sales figures based on certification alone.

== Release history ==
Year	Format(s)	Serial number	Label(s)	Ref.
1986	LP, CT, CD	L-12650, LKF-8150, 32XL-190	Warner Pioneer	
1991	CD	WPCL-421	Warner Pioneer	
1996	CD	WPC6-8191	Warner Pioneer	
2006	CD, digital download	WPCL-10287	Warner Pioneer	
2012	Super Audio CD, CD hybrid	WPCL-11145	Warner Pioneer	
2014	CD	WPCL-11731	Warner Pioneer	
2018	LP	WPJL-10094	Warner Pioneer	
2023	2CD, LP	WPCL-13476/7, WPJL-10186, WPJL-10187/8	Warner Pioneer	

Notes:

- 2006 re-release includes 24-bit digitally remastered sound source
- 2012 and 2014 re-release includes subtitles in the tracks "2012 remaster"
- 2023 re-release includes lacquer remaster which includes subtitles in the tracks "2023 lacquer remaster" along with original karaoke version of the tracks

== See also ==
- 1986 in Japanese music
