= Risa no Yōsei Densetsu =

1988 video game

- Developer: Konami
- Publisher: Konami
- Platform: Famicom Disk System
- Release: JP: May 10, 1988
- Genre: Action-adventure
- Mode: Single-player

Risa no Yōsei Densetsu (リサの妖精伝説; lit. "The Fairy Tale of Risa") is a Family Computer Disk System game, released in 1988. It stars the Japanese idol Risa Tachibana.

== Plot ==
Players play as an unnamed fan of Risa's, attending one of her concerts. The two are taken to a fantasy world where the fan must ultimately defeat Delira before they can return home.

== See also ==
- Nakayama Miho no Tokimeki High School
