= Stock (album) =

Studio album by Akina Nakamori
- Released: March 3, 1988
- Recorded: 1988
- Genre: Rock; hard rock
- Length: 44:28
- Language: Japanese
- Label: Warner Pioneer

Akina Nakamori chronology
Cross My Palm (1987)	Stock (1988)	Wonder (1988)

Stock is the twelfth studio album by Japanese singer Akina Nakamori, released on March 3, 1988. Unlike her previous albums, it has a rock influence, much like Nakamori's idol, Momoe Yamaguchi's latter albums. The main music producer is Kenji Kitajima from the rock band Fence of Defense.

== Background ==
In January 1988, inside the single "Al-Mauj" was included an inquiry letter with information about the prototype title of the upcoming studio album, Fire Water, with "Fire Starter" being a candidate for the single release. However, the title was changed to Stock and "Fire Starter" remained as an album track.

Like the previous studio albums, this does not include any promotional singles, and ten completely new songs were recorded. However, the production of songs had started three years before; these were planned to be released as singles.

Music production consisted of pop-rock-oriented musicians Kenji Kitajima from Fence of Defense, Ryo Aska from Chage and Aska, Tsugutoshi Gotō, Satoshi Nakamura, Yūko Asano, Kisaburo Suzuki, Akira Inoue and Shinji Harada.

== Stage performances ==
Nakamori performed "Farewell" on the Fuji TV music program Yoru no Hit Studio, and "Yume no Fuchi" and "Farewell" on the TV Asahi music program Music Station in early 1988.

Most of the songs have been performed only once, in the live tour Femme Fatale in 1988: "Mada Juubun Janai", "Fire Starter", "Yume no Fuchi", "Nightmare Akumu" and "Crystal Heaven".

== Chart performance ==
The album debuted at number 2 and her first full-length album not to reach on number 1 since Prologue on the Oricon Weekly Album Chart and charted for 16 weeks, selling 395,000 copies. It remained at number 14 on the 1988 Yearly Album Chart.

== Track listing ==
No.	Title	Lyrics	Music	Arrangement	Length
1.	"Farewell"	Eiko Kyo	Ken Satou	Satoshi Nakamura, Kenji Kitajima	4:25
2.	"Yume no Fuchi"	Ryo Aska	Tsugutoshi Gotō	Gotō, Nakamura	4:56
3.	"Crystal Heaven"	Yuko	Takashi Tsushimi	Masaki Matsuhara	4:46
4.	"Mada Jūbun ja nai"	Alice Satou	Tetsuji Hayashi	Matsuhara, Kitajima	4:19
5.	"Fire Starter"	Sandii	Makoto Kubota	Kitajima, Kunio Muramatsu	4:10
6.	"Nightmare (Akumu)"	Akira Ootsu	Kitajima	Kitajima, Fence of Defense	4:23
7.	"I Wanna Chance"	Kyo	Kisaburo Suzuki	Kitajima, Akira Inoue	4:33
8.	"Poison Lips"	Reiko Yukawa	Tsushimi	Kitajima, Hiroshi Shinkawa	4:01
9.	"Shōjo Densetsu"	Fumiko	Shinji Harada	Kitajima, Shingo Kobayashi	4:22
10.	"Foggy Relation"	Miyuki Nagai	Jun Satou	Kitajima, Satou	4:33
Total length:					44:28

Notes:

- All English titles are stylised in all uppercase.

== Release history ==
Year	Format(s)	Serial number	Label(s)	Ref.
1988	LP, CT, CD	L-12652, LKF-8152, 32XL-193	Warner Pioneer	
1991	CD	WPCL-424	Warner Pioneer	
2006	CD, digital download	WPCL-10289	Warner Pioneer	
2012	Super Audio CD, CD hybrid	WPCL-11147	Warner Pioneer	
2014	CD	WPCL-11733	Warner Pioneer	
2018	LP	WPJL-10096	Warner Pioneer	
2023	2CD	WPCL-13494/5	Warner Pioneer	

Notes:

- 2006 re-release includes 24-bit digitally remastered sound source
- 2012 and 2014 re-release includes subtitles in the tracks "2012 remaster"
- 2023 re-release includes lacquer remaster which includes subtitles in the tracks "2023 lacquer remaster" along with original karaoke version of the tracks

== See also ==
- 1988 in Japanese music
