= Femme Fatale (Akina Nakamori album) =

Studio album by Akina Nakamori
- Released: 3 August 1988
- Recorded: Los Angeles, 1988
- Genre: Pop
- Length: 44:40
- Language: Japanese
- Label: Warner Pioneer

Akina Nakamori chronology
Wonder (1988)	Femme Fatale (1988)	Best II (1988)

Femme Fatale is the thirteenth studio album by Japanese singer Akina Nakamori. It was released on 3 August 1988 under the Warner Pioneer label. The album consist mainly of western arrangers that evokes to the listeners the danceable melody line in western style, which was not so well common and popular in Japan during late 80s.

== Background ==
Femme Fatale was Nakamori's third studio album released in year 1988, after two months from previous mini album Wonder.

The album consist of any previously released single and includes 10 new songs recorded. While the previous studio albums "Wonder" had relaxing and studio album "Stock" hard-rock melody line, this album has the main the danceable melody line.

The music production team consist of main music arranger, Kazuo Shiina (expect of track 10) who previously collaborated with Nakamori in the studio album Crimson. This album includes many western arrangers as Jon Lind, Joey Carbone and Mark Goldenberg; and musicians Peter Frampton, Michael Thompson and Steve Farris.

Two tracks were written by Qumico Fucci, who write for Nakamori single "Tattoo". Due to the unknown reasons, the single wasn't included in the album and instead released in the compilation album Best II. The album track "Reversion (Desire)" has been recorded with the Synclavier.

The album has been positively praised by the critics. Writer Yukiko Kitajima points out Nakamori's singing in the very sensual way.

In the weekly journal of Oricon Weekly Charts, the editors praised for Nakamori experimenting with the various vocal range performance, including shouting (La Liberte), sensual (Dakishimeteite) and whisper chanting (Femme Fatale).

== Stage performances ==
In Fuji TV music television program Yoru no Hit Studio, Nakamori performed So Mad, Dakishimete and La Liberte. In Asahi TV music television program Music Station, Nakamori performed So Mad.

So Mad, Dakishimeteite and La Liberte were performed in Nakamori's live tour Femme Fatale in 1988.

== Chart performance ==
The album reached number 1 on the Oricon Weekly Album Charts and sold over 268,800 copies. The sales numbers makes Nakamori's the lowest sold album during her stay in the recording label Warner Pioneer. The album remained at number 30 on the Oricon Album Yearly Charts in 1988. It's Nakamori's second album (after Stock, #14), which remained in the Yearly Album Charts in 1988.

== Track listing ==
No.	Title	Lyrics	Music	Arranger(s)	Length
1.	"Reversion (Desire)"	Kei Michiyuki	Alan Gorrie, Diana Miller	Scott Wilk, Kazuo Shiina	4:39
2.	"Heartbreak"	Kumiko Aoki	Masayuki Kuzuguchi	Jon Lind, Shiina	4:12
3.	"Dakishimeteite (Love Is My Favorite Lesson)"	Kayoko Fuyumori	Junie Morrison	Mark Goldenberg, Shiina	4:32
4.	"Femme Fatale"	Aoki	Nick Wood	Lind, Shiina	4:33
5.	"I Know Kodoku no Sei"	Qumico Fucci	Fucci	Goldenberg, Shiina	4:34
6.	"La Liberté"	Yuriko Mori	Joey Carbone	Carbone, Shiina	4:36
7.	"So Mad"	Fuyumori	Anri Sekine	Wilk, Shiina	4:20
8.	"Paradise Lost (Love Is In Fashion)"	Mori	Robert Etoll, Michael Des Barres	Goldenberg, Shiina	4:09
9.	"Move Me (Strictly Confidential)"	Yoshiko Hamada	Etoll, Peter Bliss	Wilk, Shiina	4:07
10.	"Jive"	Fucci	Takashi Tsushimi	Jun Miyake	4:04
Total length:					43:40

== Covers ==
Hong Kong male group Grasshopper covered Heartbreak in Cantonese version and was recorded in the album Our Grasshopper in 1989 under Universal Music Group.

== Release history ==
Year	Format(s)	Serial number	Label(s)	Ref.
1989	LP, CT, CD	L-12653, LKF-8153, 32XL-195	Warner Pioneer	
1991	CD	WPCL-426	Warner Pioneer	
2006	CD, digital download	WPCL-10290	Warner Pioneer	
2012	Super Audio CD, CD hybrid	WPCL-11148	Warner Pioneer	
2014	CD	WPCL-11734	Warner Pioneer	
2018	LP	WPJL-10097	Warner Pioneer	
2023	2CD	WPCL-13509/10	Warner Pioneer	

Note:

- 2006 re-release includes 24-bit digitally remastered sound source
- 2012 and 2014 re-release includes subtitles in the tracks "2012 remaster"
- 2023 re-release includes lacquer remaster which includes subtitles in the tracks "2023 lacquer remaster" along with original karaoke version of the tracks

== See also ==
- 1988 in Japanese music
