= Keisuke Kuwata (album) =

Studio album by Keisuke Kuwata
- Released: 9 July 1988
- Recorded: July 1987 – May 1988, at the Victor Aoyama Studio (Tokyo, Japan)
- Genre: Rock, pop, adult contemporary
- Length: 48:20
- Language: Japanese, English
- Label: Victor Entertainment/Taishita
- Producer: Keisuke Kuwata, Takeshi Kobayashi, Takeshi Fujii

Keisuke Kuwata chronology
Keisuke Kuwata (1988)	Kodoku no Taiyō (1994)

Singles from Keisuke Kuwata
- 1. "Itsuka Dokoka de (I Feel the Echo)" Released: 6 October 1987; 2. "Kanashii Kimochi" Released: 16 March 1988

Keisuke Kuwata is the debut solo studio album recorded by Keisuke Kuwata, the frontman of the Japanese rock band Southern All Stars. It was released by Taishita label under the Victor Entertainment in July 1988, shortly after the 10th anniversary of the band.

== Track listing ==
All tracks are written by Keisuke Kuwata.

No.	Title	Length
1.	"Kanashimi no Prisoner (哀しみのプリズナー)"	4:16
2.	"Ima demo Kimi o Aishiteru (今でも君を愛してる)"	3:27
3.	"Robō no Ie nite (路傍の家にて)"	3:33
4.	"Dear Boys"	3:18
5.	"Heart ni Burei Bijin (ハートに無礼美人) (Get out of My Chevvy)"	3:39
6.	"Itsuka Dokoka de (いつか何処かで) (I Feel the Echo)"	5:19
7.	"Big Blonde Boy"	3:44
8.	"Blue (こんな夜には眠れない, Konna Yoru ni wa Nemurenai)"	4:50
9.	"Tōi Machikado (遠い街角) (The Wanderin' Street)"	3:57
10.	"Kanashii Kimochi (悲しい気持ち) (Just a Man in Love)"	3:54
11.	"Aibu to Satsui no Kōsaten (愛撫と殺意の交差点)"	3:36
12.	"Dareka no Kaze no Ato (誰かの風の跡)"	4:44

== Personnel ==
- Keisuke Kuwata – vocals, chorus, produce, arrangement
- Takeshi Kobayashi – keyboards, synthesizer, synth bass, background vocals, produce, arrangement
- Takeshi Fujii – drum programming, synth programming, sequencing, computer programming, produce, arrangement

Additional players

- Satoshi Kadokura – synthesizer, synth bass, co-arrangement on track 11
- Susumu Osada – guitar
- Sueaki Harada – acoustic guitar, electric guitar, ukulele
- Makoto Saito – acoustic guitar
- Toshiaki Usui – acoustic guitar
- Junichi Kawauchi – acoustic guitar
- Jun Shimoyama – guitar
- Jin Takuma – bass
- Tatsuhiko Hizawa – bass
- Hideo Yamaki – snare, cymbals
- Soul Toul – mallet cymbals
- Osamu Matsumoto – trombone

Guest vocalists

- Ann Lewis – chorus
- Mariya Takeuchi – chorus
- Yūko Hara – chorus
- Masamichi Sugi – chorus
- Haruko Kuwana – chorus
- Yūki Kuwata – shout

== Accolades ==
=== Japan Record Awards ===
Year	Nominee / work	Award	Result
1988	Keisuke Kuwata	Excellent Albums	Won

== Charts ==
=== Weekly charts ===
Chart (1988)	Position	Sales
Japanese Oricon Albums Chart	1	655,000+

=== Year-end charts ===
Chart (1988)	Position
Japanese Albums Chart	6
