= Nonfiction Ecstasy =

Single by Akina Nakamori

from the album Best II
- Language: Japanese
- B-side: "Fin (Karaoke); Abunai Mon Amour (Karaoke)"
- Released: November 10, 1986
- Recorded: 1986
- Genre: J-pop; kayōkyoku
- Length: 3:30
- Label: Reprise Records
- Songwriter: Kazuko Sakata

Akina Nakamori singles chronology
"Fin" (1986)	"Nonfiction Ecstasy" (1986)	"Tango Noir" (1987)

"Nonfiction Ecstasy" (ノンフィクション エクスタシー, Nonfikushon Ekusutashī) is a single by Japanese entertainer Akina Nakamori. Written by Kazuko Sakata, the single was released on November 10, 1986, by Warner Pioneer through the Reprise label. This was Nakamori's only single to be released exclusively on cassette format. It was also the lead single from her fourth compilation album Best II.

The single became Nakamori's 14th No. 1 on Oricon's weekly singles chart and sold over 61,700 copies.

== Track listing ==
Side A
No.	Title	Lyrics	Music	Arrangement	Length
1.	"Nonfiction Ecstasy" (Nonfikushon Ekusutashī (ノンフィクション エクスタシー))	Kazuko Sakata	Sakata	Kazuo Shiina	3:30
2.	"Nonfiction Ecstasy" (Karaoke)

Side B
No.	Title	Lyrics	Music	Arrangement	Length
1.	"Fin (Karaoke)"	Ikki Matsumoto	Ken Satō	Jun Satō
2.	"Abunai Mon Amour (Karaoke)" ((危ないMON AMOUR; "My Dangerous Love"))	Eiko Kyo	Kisaburō Suzuki	Kazuo Shiina

== Charts ==
Chart (1986)	Peak position
Japan (Oricon)	1

== See also ==
- 1986 in Japanese music
