= Tokyo Rose (song) =

Single by Akina Nakamori

from the album True Album Akina 95 Best
- Language: Japanese
- B-side: "Yasashii Kankei"
- Released: November 1, 1995
- Recorded: 1995
- Studio: Ocean Way Recording
- Genre: J-pop; rockabilly
- Length: 4:46
- Label: MCA Victor
- Composer: Masaki
- Lyricists: Akina Nakamori; Takashi Kamisawatsu
- Producer: Brian Setzer

Akina Nakamori singles chronology
"Genshi, Onna wa Taiyō Datta" (1995)	"Tokyo Rose" (1995)	"Moonlight Shadow: Tsuki ni Hoero" (1996)

"Tokyo Rose" (トーキョー・ローズ, Tōkyō Rōzu) is the 32nd single by Japanese entertainer Akina Nakamori (credited as "Akina"). Written by Nakamori, Takashi Kamisawatsu, and Masaki and produced by Brian Setzer, the single was released on November 1, 1995, by MCA Victor. This was the first single to be co-written by Nakamori. It was also the lead single from her compilation album True Album Akina 95 Best.

The single peaked at No. 32 on Oricon's weekly singles chart and sold over 35,700 copies. It was Nakamori's first single since her 1982 debut "Slow Motion" to miss the top-30, and her first single to sell under 50,000 copies.

== Track listing ==
All music is arranged by Brian Setzer.

Original release
No.	Title	Lyrics	Music	Length
1.	"Tokyo Rose"	Akina Nakamori; Takashi Kamisawatsu	Masaki	4:10
2.	"Yasashii Kankei" ((優しい関係; "Friendly Relationship"))	Seriko Natsuno	Setzer	3:22
3.	"Tokyo Rose" (Original Karaoke)			4:10
4.	"Yasashii Kankei" (Original Karaoke)			3:22
Total length:				15:04

== Personnel ==
- Brian Setzer – guitar
- Johnny Baz – bass
- Bill Bateman – drums

== Charts ==
Chart (1995)	Peak position
Japan (Oricon)	32
