= Cross My Palm =

Studio album by Akina Nakamori
- Released: August 25, 1987
- Recorded: April 1987 (New York)
- Genres: J-pop; adult contemporary; pop rock; synth-pop
- Length: 46:46
- Language: English
- Labels: Warner Pioneer, Atlantic Records

Akina Nakamori chronology
CD'87 (1987)	Cross My Palm (1987)	Stock (1988)

Cross My Palm is the eleventh studio album by Japanese singer Akina Nakamori, released on 25 August 1987 by Warner Pioneer. It was Nakamori's first English-language album.

== Background ==
Cross My Palm is the second studio album to be recorded in the United States, five years after her debut album Prologue (Jomaku) and the first studio album to be produced by western musicians and writers as David Batteau, Tony Humecke, Roger Daltrey, Julia Downes and Sandy Stewart.

Nakamori's inspiration for the album came from American films such as Top Gun and Footloose.

"Modern Woman" is a cover of "Femmes d'aujourd'hui" by French singer Jeanne Mas and the title track is a cover of the song by British writer Chris Morris.

"The Look That Kills" is an English-language self-cover of her 1987 No. 1 hit "Blonde". The single was released two months before the album's release. While the melody line resembles to the original, she performs it in the higher key tune than original, arrangement is slightly renewed and is sixteen seconds shorter.

== Marketing ==
=== Pioneer Corporation's television commercial ===
"Modern Woman" was used by Pioneer Corporation in a commercial to promote the Private CD770D mini component stereo system.

=== Music video album ===
Four months after the release of album, a companion music video album was released on 21 December 1987. The video album features Nakamori as a musician who aims to go professional. It was filmed in New York City between 13 and 24 April 1987. "No More" includes a new remixed intro not found in the album version. The video received an award at the AVA Digital Content Grand Prix in 1987.

=== Photo book ===
The companion photo book Akina Nakamori Visual Book Cross My Palm (中森明菜写真集 VISUAL BOOK Cross My Palm, Nakamori Akina shashin-shū Bijuaru Bukku Kurosu Mai Pāmu) was released on 24 December 1987.

== Stage performances ==
On Fuji TV's music show Yoru no Hit Studio, Nakamori performed "Soft Touch" in Paris in 1989. She performed "The Look That Kills" on the 25 December 1987 episode of TV Asahi's Music Station.

Some tracks were performed in her live shows as well: During the live tour for A Hundred Days in 1987 she performed "Soft Touch", "Political Moves", and "The Look That Kills". She performed "Cross My Palm", "My Position", "Soft Touch", "The Look That Kills" and "No More" in the 1991 special live show "Yume".

== Chart performance ==
Cross My Palm hit No. 1 on Oricon's weekly albums chart and sold 347,700 copies. The album remained at number 19 on Oricon's yearly albums chart in 1987.

The album was released in the United States in 1989 under Atlantic Records; however, it sold poorly in the country, peaking at No. 90 on the Billboard 200.

== Reception ==
The reviewer in Cash Box said the songs in the album were between the kind of songs sung by Taylor Dayne, and the kind sung by Paula Abdul.

== Track listing ==
No.	Title	Lyrics	Music	Length
1.	"Cross My Palm"	Barrie Corbett; John De Plesses	Chris Morris	3:42
2.	"Political Moves"	Julia Downes; Roger Bruno; Ellen Schwartz	Downer; Bruno; Schwartz	4:27
3.	"Slave for Love"	David Batteau; Don Freeman	Batteau; Freeman	3:54
4.	"Easy Rider"	Batteau; Danny Sembello; Gardner Cole	Batteau; Sembello; Cole	4:13
5.	"Modern Woman"	Jeanne Mas	Romano Musumarra; Roberto Zaneli	4:12
6.	"The Look that kills"	Biddu; Winston Sela	Biddu; Sela	3:38
7.	"Soft Touch"	Steve Skaith; Steve Jeffries	Skaith; Jeffries	3:34
8.	"My Position"	Humecke; Batteau; Robin Lane	Humecke; Batteau; Lane	3:37
9.	"The Touch of Heartache"	Jill Colucci; Bruno; Schwartz	Colucci; Bruno; Schwartz	4:13
10.	"House of Love"	Sandy Steward	Steward	4:51
11.	"No More"	Skaith; Jeffries	Skaith; Jeffries	3:10
12.	"He's Just in Love with the Beat"	Roy Freeland; Bruno; Schwartz	Freeland; Bruno; Schwartz	3:15
Total length:				46:46

2023 remaster reissue
No.	Title	Lyrics	Music	Length
13.	"Cross My Palm" (movie Cross My Palm version)	Barrie Corbett; John De Plesses	Chris Morris	3:27
14.	"The Touch of Heartache" (movie Cross My Palm version)	Jill Colucci; Bruno; Schwartz	Colucci; Bruno; Schwartz	4:07
15.	"Easy Rider" (movie Cross My Palm version)	Batteau; Danny Sembello; Gardner Cole	Batteau; Sembello; Cole	4:19
16.	"House of Love" (movie Cross My Palm version)	Sandy Steward	Steward	4:30
17.	"Political Moves" (movie Cross My Palm version)	Julia Downes; Roger Bruno; Ellen Schwartz	Downer; Bruno; Schwartz	4:16
18.	"The Look that kills" (movie Cross My Palm version)	Biddu; Winston Sela	Biddu; Sela	3:35
19.	"Soft Touch" (movie Cross My Palm version)	Steve Skaith; Steve Jeffries	Skaith; Jeffries	4:33
20.	"No More" (movie Cross My Palm version)	Skaith; Jeffries	Skaith; Jeffries	3:58
Total length:				79:00

Notes:

- "Modern Woman" is titled as "Modern Woman (Femme d'aujourd'hui)" in the album liner notes.

== Release history ==
Year	Format(s)	Serial number	Label(s)	Ref.
1987	LP, CT, CD	L-12651, LKF-8151, 32XL-192	Warner Pioneer	
1989	LP, CT, CD	82037-1, 82037-4, 82037-2	Atlantic Records	
1991	CD	WPCL-423	Warner Pioneer	
2006	CD, digital download	WPCL-10288	Warner Pioneer	
2012	Super Audio CD, CD hybrid	WPCL-11147	Warner Pioneer	
2014	CD	WPCL-11733	Warner Pioneer	
2018	LP	WPJL-10095	Warner Pioneer	
2023	2CD	WPCL-13492/3	Warner Pioneer	

Notes:

- 2006 re-release includes 24-bit digitally remastered sound source
- 2012 and 2014 re-release includes subtitles in the tracks "2012 remaster"
- 2023 re-release includes lacquer remaster which includes subtitles in the tracks "2023 lacquer remaster" along with original karaoke version of the tracks
