= 29th Japan Record Awards =

1987 Japanese music awards ceremony

- Date: 31 December 1987
- Venue: Nippon Budokan, Tokyo
- Hosted by: Hiroshi Sekiguchi

Television/radio coverage
- Network: TBS

The 29th Japan Record Awards were held on 31 December 1987. They recognized accomplishments by musicians from the previous year.

The audience rating was 29.4%.

== Award winners ==
- Japan Record Award:
  - Masahiko Kondo for "Orokamono"
- Best Vocalist:
  - Miyako Otsuki
- Best New Artist:
  - Risa Tachibana
- Best Album:
  - Tsuyoshi Nagabuchi for "LICENSE"

== See also ==
- 1987 in Japanese music
