= Al-Mauj =

Single by Akina Nakamori

from the album Best II
- Language: Japanese
- B-side: "Bara Hitoyo"
- Released: January 27, 1988
- Recorded: 1987
- Genre: Arabic music
- Length: 4:07
- Label: Reprise Records
- Composer: Takashi Satō
- Lyricist: Akira Ōtsu

Akina Nakamori singles chronology
"Nanpasen" (1987)	"Al-Mauj" (1988)	"Tattoo" (1988)

Music videos
- "Al-Mauj" (Live) on YouTube

"Al-Mauj" (アルマージ, Al Māji) (stylized as آلموج) is the 20th single by Japanese entertainer Akina Nakamori. Written by Akira Ōtsu and Takashi Satō, the single was released on January 27, 1988, by Warner Pioneer through the Reprise label. It was also the fourth single from her fourth compilation album Best II.

== Background ==
"Al-Mauj" is Arabic for "wave". The song was originally recorded by Takashi Satō as "Déraciné" (デラシネ, Derashine) on his 1987 album Mizu no Naka no Taiyō (水の中の太陽; lit. Sun in the Water). The jacket photo was taken in Mykonos. On live TV performances, Nakamori had her microphone stand wrapped with rubber snakes.

== Chart performance ==
"Al-Mauj" became Nakamori's 18th No. 1 on Oricon's weekly singles chart and sold over 296,600 copies.

== Track listing ==
All lyrics are written by Akira Ōtsu.

Original release
No.	Title	Music	Arrangement	Length
1.	"Al-Mauj" (Al Māji (AL-MAUJ（アルマージ）))	Takashi Satō	Satoshi Takebe	4:07
2.	"Bara Hitoyo" ((薔薇一夜; "One Night of Roses"))	Kisaburō Suzuki	Kazuo Ōtani	4:43
Total length:				8:50

1998 reissue bonus track
No.	Title	Music	Length
3.	"Al-Mauj (Live Version)" ((AL-MAUJ（アルマージ）(LIVE VERSION)))	Satō

== Charts ==
Chart (1988)	Peak position
Japan (Oricon)	1

== Release history ==
Year	Format(s)	Serial number	Label(s)	Ref.
1988	7inch LP, 8cm CD, CT	L-1755, 10SL-100, 10L5-4059	Warner Pioneer	
1998	12cm CD	WPC6-8677	Warner Pioneer	
2008	Digital download	-	Warner Pioneer	
2014	Digital download - remaster	-	Warner Pioneer	

== See also ==
- 1988 in Japanese music
