= Blonde (Akina Nakamori song) =

Single by Akina Nakamori

from the album Best II
- Language: Japanese
- B-side: "Amish"
- Released: June 3, 1987
- Recorded: 1987
- Genre: J-pop; kayōkyoku; city pop
- Length: 3:53
- Label: Reprise Records
- Composers: Biddu; Winston Sela
- Lyricists: Biddu; Winston Sela; Keiko Asō

Akina Nakamori singles chronology
"Tango Noir" (1987)	"Blonde" (1987)	"Nanpasen" (1987)

Music videos
- "Blonde" (Live) on YouTube

"Blonde" (ブロンド, Burondo) is the 18th single by Japanese entertainer Akina Nakamori. Written by Biddu, Winston Sela, and Keiko Asō, the single was released on June 3, 1987, by Warner Pioneer through the Reprise label. It was also the second single from her fourth compilation album Best II.

== Background ==
"Blonde" is the Japanese-language version of the song "The Look That Kills", which was from Nakamori's 1987 English-language album Cross My Palm. It was given a different arrangement by Satoshi Nakamura. On live TV performances, Nakamori wore a costume designed by Hermès.

Nakamori has re-recorded "Blonde" for the 1995 compilation True Album Akina 95 Best.

== Chart performance ==
"Blonde" became Nakamori's 16th No. 1 on Oricon's weekly singles chart and sold over 301,400 copies.

== Track listing ==
Original release
No.	Title	Lyrics	Music	Arrangement	Length
1.	"Blonde"	Biddu; Winston Sela; Keiko Asō	Biddu; Sela	Satoshi Nakamura	3:53
2.	"Amish" (Āmisshu (清教徒（アーミッシュ）))	Yasushi Akimoto	Toshinobu Kubota	Satoshi Takebe	3:44
Total length:					7:37

1998 reissue bonus track
No.	Title	Lyrics	Music	Length
3.	"Blonde" (Live Version)	Biddu; Sela; Asō	Biddu; Sela

== Cover versions ==
- Hongkong singer Samantha Lam covered the song under title "Shang Xin Xi Yuan" in 1988 released under Hongkong´s Sony BMG Music Ent recording label.

== Charts ==
Chart (1987)	Peak position
Japan (Oricon)	1

== Release history ==
Year	Format(s)	Serial number	Label(s)	Ref.
1987	7inch LP	L-1754	Warner Pioneer	
1988	8cm CD, CT	10SL-148, 10L5-4057	Warner Pioneer	
1998	12cm CD	WPC6-8675	Warner Pioneer	
2008	Digital download	-	Warner Pioneer	
2014	Digital download - remaster	-	Warner Pioneer	

== See also ==
- 1987 in Japanese music
