= Tokiko Kato =

Japanese singer, composer, lyricist, actress and activist (born 1943)

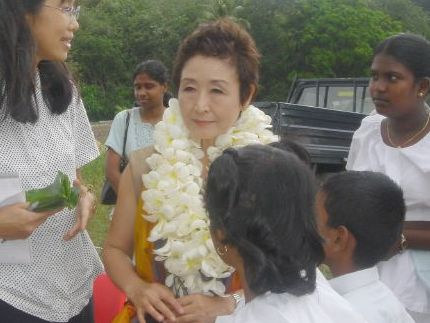

Background information
- Born: Tokiko Kato (加藤 登紀子, Katō Tokiko); December 27, 1943 (age 82)
- Origin: Harbin, Manchukuo
- Genres: Chanson, pop, Kayōkyoku, new wave, folk
- Occupation: Singer-songwriter
- Years active: 1966–present
- Labels: Polydor Records; Universal Music Group

Tokiko Kato (加藤 登紀子, Katō Tokiko; born December 27, 1943) is a Japanese singer, composer, lyricist, actress and activist.

She was born in Harbin, Manchukuo, to Japanese parents. She graduated from the University of Tokyo. She worked as a visiting professor at Josai International University. Her career and personal life became deeply intertwined with Japan's radical 1960s student and peace movements. 1972 she married Toshio Fujimoto, leader of the student movement, who was in jail.

While being held hostage by hijackers on All Nippon Airways Flight 857, Kato used her cell phone to keep in contact with police during the hijacking.

In the late summer of 2023, as geopolitical tensions simmered between China and Japan, she staged a concert for peace in Harbin,.

== Discography ==
=== Album ===
- 私の中のひとり (1970), Polydor Records
- この世に生まれてきたら (1974), Polydor Records
- いく時代かがありまして (1975), Polydor Records
- 回帰船 (1976), Polydor Records
- さびた車輪 (1977) Kitty Records
- A Siren Dream (1983), Polydor Records
- 日本哀歌集 (1983), Polydor Records
- La Femme qui vient de Cypango (1991), Universal
- Hana (1995), Universal
- Tokiko Poesie 2000, Universal/Polygram
- World Of 2001, Sony
- Tokiko Songs 2001, Sony
- Tokiko Dance Odore Toki Wo Wasurete 2001, Sony
- Okinawajohka 2003, Universal
- Cypango 2004, Sony
- Ima Ga Ashita To Deau Toki 2004, Universal
- Doko Ni Itemo Watashi 2005, Universal
- Prime Selection Kato Tokiko 2006, Universal
- Chansons Tokiko France Joka 2006, Teichiku Records
- Kono Yo Ni Umarete Kitara 2006, Universal
- Manatsuno Yoruno Concert 2007, Universal

=== Singles ===
- Nanpasen (1984), gifted to Akina Nakamori in 1987

=== Live and collaborations ===
- Live – Tokiko Kato and Kiyoshi Hasegawa (1978), Polydor Records
- Miłość ci wszystko wybaczy – Tokiko Kato and Ryuichi Sakamoto (1982), Polydor Records
- Songs from the Cold Seas – Hector Zazou (1994), Columbia Records

== Filmography ==
=== Films ===
- Izakaya Chōji (1983) as Shigeko
- Hachikō Monogatari (1987) as Tamiko
- Hana no Kisetsu (悲しき天使) (1990)
- Porco Rosso (1992) as Madame Gina (voice)
- Open House (1998) as Tokiko
- Ori Ume (折り梅) (2002)
- Mokuyo Kumikyoku (木曜組曲) (2002) as Eiko
- Let's Talk About the Old Times (2022) as herself

=== Television ===
1. Walkers: maigo no otona-tachi (ウォーカーズ〜迷子の大人たち) (4 episodes, 2006) as Michiyo Yamashita
2. Tōfu Pro-Wrestling (豆腐プロレス, Tōfu puroresu) (2017) narration
