= Liar (Akina Nakamori song) =

Single by Akina Nakamori

from the album Cruise
- Language: Japanese
- B-side: "Blue on Pink"
- Released: April 25, 1989
- Recorded: 1988
- Genre: J-pop; kayōkyoku
- Length: 4:35
- Label: Reprise Records
- Composer: Kazuya Izumi
- Lyricist: Mitsuko Shiramine

Akina Nakamori singles chronology
"I Missed the Shock" (1988)	"Liar" (1989)	"Dear Friend" (1990)

Music videos
- "Liar" (Live) on YouTube

"Liar" (ライアー, Raiā) is the 23rd single by Japanese entertainer Akina Nakamori. Written by Mitsuko Shiramine and Kazuya Izumi, the single was released on April 25, 1989, by Warner Pioneer through the Reprise label. It was also the lead single from her 14th studio album Cruise.

== Background ==
"Liar" was recorded and released at a time Nakamori experienced a crisis in both her career and personal life. Despite being a chart-topper and award-winner, she saw her record sales steadily declining in favor of newer idol singers. Furthermore, she was in a very unstable relationship with Masahiko Kondō. It was revealed through the tabloid Friday that Nakamori had been funding Kondō's side hobbies such as auto racing and that he owed her and her former talent agency tens of millions of yen. In July 1989, three months after the release of the single, Nakamori attempted to commit suicide amidst rumors of Kondō having an affair with Seiko Matsuda. This led to the "Golden Screen Incident" months later, when both Nakamori and Kondō held a press conference in front of a gold-colored backdrop (which is traditionally used to announce engagements) to explain the events leading to Nakamori's suicide attempt. In the aftermath of the press conference, both Nakamori and Kondō were dropped from the lineup of the 40th Kōhaku Uta Gassen while Nakamori was shunned by the industry, leading to her alcohol and smoking addiction during the 1990s.

Nakamori has re-recorded "Liar" for the 1995 compilation True Album Akina 95 Best.

== Chart performance ==
"Liar" became Nakamori's 20th No. 1 on Oricon's weekly singles chart and sold over 274,700 copies. It was also certified Gold by the RIAJ.

== Track listing ==
Original release
No.	Title	Lyrics	Music	Arrangement	Length
1.	"Liar"	Mitsuko Shiramine	Kazuya Izumi	Akira Nishihira	4:35
2.	"Blue on Pink"	Yoshiko Miura	Wataru Kuniyasu	Kei Wakakusa	3:42
Total length:					8:17

1998 reissue bonus track
No.	Title	Lyrics	Music	Length
3.	"Liar" (Live Version)	Shiramine	Izumi

== Charts ==
Chart (1989)	Peak position
Japan (Oricon)	1

== Certification ==
Region	Certification	Certified units/sales
Japan (RIAJ)	Gold	200,000^{^}
^{^} Shipments figures based on certification alone.

== Release history ==
Year	Format(s)	Serial number	Label(s)	Ref.
1989	7inch LP, 8cm CD, CT	06L7-4070, 09L3-4070, 09L5-4070	Warner Pioneer	
1998	12cm CD	WPC6-8680	Warner Pioneer	
2008	Digital download	-	Warner Pioneer	
2014	Digital download - remaster	-	Warner Pioneer	

== See also ==
- 1989 in Japanese music
