= Fin (song) =

Single by Akina Nakamori

from the album CD'87
- Language: Japanese
- B-side: "Abunai Mon Amour"
- Released: September 25, 1986
- Recorded: 1986
- Genre: J-pop; kayōkyoku
- Length: 4:27
- Label: Reprise Records
- Composer: Ken Satō
- Lyricist: Ikki Matsumoto
- Producer: Yūzō Shimada

Akina Nakamori singles chronology
"Gypsy Queen" (1986)	"Fin" (1986)	"Nonfiction Ecstasy" (1986)

Music videos
- "Fin" (Live) on YouTube

"Fin" (フィン) is the 16th single by Japanese entertainer Akina Nakamori. Written by Ikki Matsumoto and Ken Satō, the single was released on September 25, 1986, by Warner Pioneer through the Reprise label. It was also the third single from her third compilation album CD'87.

The single became Nakamori's 13th No. 1 on Oricon's weekly singles chart and sold over 318,300 copies.

== Track listing ==
Original release
No.	Title	Lyrics	Music	Arrangement	Length
1.	"Fin"	Ikki Matsumoto	Ken Satō	Jun Satō	4:10
2.	"Abunai Mon Amour" ((危ないMON AMOUR; "My Dangerous Love"))	Eiko Kyo	Kisaburō Suzuki	Kazuo Shiina	4:46
Total length:					8:56

1998 reissue bonus track
No.	Title	Lyrics	Music	Length
3.	"Fin" (Live Version)	Matsumoto	K. Satō

== Charts ==
Chart (1986)	Peak position
Japan (Oricon)	1

== Release history ==
Year	Format(s)	Serial number	Label(s)	Ref.
1986	7inch LP	L-1752	Warner Pioneer	
1988	8cm CD, CT	10SL-145, 10L5-4054	Warner Pioneer	
1998	12cm CD	WPC6-8672	Warner Pioneer	
2008	Digital download	-	Warner Pioneer	
2014	Digital download - remaster	-	Warner Pioneer	

== Cover versions ==
- Hong Kong singer Sandy Lamb covered in Cantonese the song titled "晴天雨天" and was released on her album Chi Xin in 1987.

== See also ==
- 1986 in Japanese music
