= I Missed the Shock =

Single by Akina Nakamori

from the album Best II
- Language: Japanese
- B-side: "Bilitis"
- Released: November 1, 1988
- Recorded: 1988
- Genre: J-pop; kayōkyoku; pop rock
- Length: 4:09
- Label: Reprise Records
- Songwriter: Qumico Fucci

Akina Nakamori singles chronology
"Tattoo" (1988)	"I Missed the Shock" (1988)	"Liar" (1989)

Music videos
- "I Missed the Shock" (Live) on YouTube

"I Missed the Shock" is the 22nd single by Japanese entertainer Akina Nakamori. Written by Qumico Fucci, the single was released on November 1, 1988, by Warner Pioneer through the Reprise label. It was also the sixth single from her fourth compilation album Best II.

== Background ==
"I Missed the Shock" was written by Qumico Fucci (福士 久美子, Fukushi Kumiko), who was a member of the band Sherbets. It was arranged by the band Eurox, who were involved in Nakamori's 1986 album Fushigi. On live performances of the song, Nakamori wore a costume that she found on an Isetan department store magazine advertisement. Costume designer Mariko Koga was initially reluctant to provide it to Nakamori, but she saw Nakamori's enthusiasm and gave it to her. The costume was featured in Nakamori's Femme Fatale tour in 1989.

Nakamori also performed the song on the 39th Kōhaku Uta Gassen, making her sixth appearance on NHK's New Year's Eve special. She would not appear on the special again until 2002.

Fucci later covered the song on her 1994 album Sad Lion (悲しいライオン, Kanashī Raion).

== Chart performance ==
"I Missed the Shock" peaked at No. 3 on Oricon's weekly singles chart and sold over 311,200 copies, ending a streak of 16 No. 1 singles from 1984 to 1988.

== Track listing ==
Original release
No.	Title	Lyrics	Music	Arrangement	Length
1.	"I Missed the Shock"	Qumico Fucci	Fucci	Eurox	4:09
2.	"Bilitis"	Eiko Kyo	Akihiro Yoshimi	Satoshi Takebe	4:20
Total length:					8:29

1998 reissue bonus track
No.	Title	Lyrics	Music	Length
3.	"Tattoo" (Live Version)	Moriko	Sekine

== Charts ==
Chart (1988)	Peak position
Japan (Oricon)	3

== Release history ==
Year	Format(s)	Serial number	Label(s)	Ref.
1988	7inch LP, 8cm CD, CT	07L7-4030, 10L3-4030, 10L5-4030	Warner Pioneer	
1998	12cm CD	WPC6-8679	Warner Pioneer	
2008	Digital download	-	Warner Pioneer	
2014	Digital download - remaster	-	Warner Pioneer	

== See also ==
- 1988 in Japanese music
