= FNS Music Festival =

Television series

- Genre: Music festival
- Country of origin: Japan
- Original language: Japanese
- No. of episodes: 51 festivals

Production
- Production locations: Grand Prince Hotel New Takanawa & Fuji TV Studio
- Running time: 4 hours, 18 minutes
- Production company: Fuji Television

Original release
- Network: FNS (Fuji TV)
- Release: July 2, 1974 – present

FNS Music Festival
- Awarded for: Outstanding achievements in the record industry
- Country: Japan
- Presented by: Fuji Television
- First award: 1974
- Final award: 1990
- Website: Official Website

The FNS Music Festival (FNS歌謡祭, Efuenuesu Kayōsai) is an annual music show held among the Fuji Network System and Fuji Television since 1974. The program originated as a song contest to celebrate Fuji TV's 15th anniversary. It is commonly known as FNS, however it has no official short name.

The program and its annual specials, spanning more than 50 years, has its Spring special cancelled for the first time, due to a lack of commercial sponsors in 2025.

== Grand Prix Winners (1974–1990) ==
Year	Song	Artist
1974	"Miren"	Hiroshi Itsuki
1975	"Cyclamen no Kaori"	Akira Fuse
1976	"Kita no Yadokara"	Harumi Miyako
1977	"Tsugaru Kaikyō Fuyugeshiki"	Sayuri Ishikawa
1978	"LOVE (Dakishimetai)"	Kenji Sawada
1979	"Y.M.C.A."	Hideki Saijo
1980	"Futari no Yoake"	Hiroshi Itsuki
1981	"Ruby no Yubiwa"	Akira Terao
1982	"Nobara no Etude"	Seiko Matsuda
1983	"Yagiri no Watashi"	Takashi Hosokawa
1984	"Nagaragawa Enka"	Hiroshi Itsuki
1985	"Meu amor é..."	Akina Nakamori
1986	"Desire (Jōnetsu)"	Akina Nakamori
1987	"Oroka Mono"	Masahiko Kondo
1988	"Witches"	Miho Nakayama
1989	"Taiyō ga Ippai"	Hikaru Genji
1990	Odoru Pompokolin	B.B. Queens

== Best Singer Award ==
Year		Artist	Song
1974	1	Akira Fuse	"Tsumiki no Heya"
1974	2	Shinichi Mori	"Kita Kōro"
1975	1	Goro Noguchi	"Kanashimi no Owaru Toki"
1975	2	Akira Fuse	"Katamuita Michishirube"
1976		Harumi Miyako	"Kita no Yadokara"
1977		Sayuri Ishikawa	"Tsugaru Kaikyō Fuyugeshiki"
1978		Hideki Saijo	"Blue Sky Blue"
1979		Judy Ongg	"Miserarete"
1980		Mayumi Itsuwa	"Koibito yo"
1981		Hiromi Iwasaki	"Sumire Iro no Namida"
1982		Hiroshi Itsuki	"Chigiri"
1983		Seiko Matsuda	"Glass no Ringo"
1984		Anzen Chitai	"Wine Red no Kokoro"
1985		Anzen Chitai	"Kanashimi ni Sayonara"
1986		Akira Kobayashi	"Atsuki Kokoro ni"
1987		Akina Nakamori	"Nanpasen"
1988		Akina Nakamori	"I Missed the Shock"
1989		Takashi Hosokawa	"Kitaguni e"
1990		-	-

== Best New Artist Award ==
Year		Artist	Song
1974	1	Kiyoshi Nakajo	"Uso"
1974	2	Mineko Nishikawa	"Anata ni Ageru"
1975	1	Takashi Hosokawa	"Kokoro Nokori"
1975	2	Hiromi Iwasaki	"Romance"
1976		Yasuko Naito	"Otouto yo"
1977		Mizue Takada	"Glass Zaka"
1978		Muneyuki Satō	"Aobajō Koi Uta"
1979		Mariko Tsubota	"How! Wonderful"
1980		Toshihiko Tahara	"Hattoshite! Good"
1981		Masahiko Kondō	"Gin Gira Gin ni Sarigenaku"
1982		Shibugakitai	"100%... So Kamone!"
1983		The Good-Bye	"Kimagure one way boy"
1984		Yukiko Okada	"Dreaming Girl Koi, Hajimemashite"
1985		Minako Honda	"Temptation"
1986		Shonentai	"Kamen Butōkai"
1987		BaBe	"I Don't Know!"
1988		Sakura Yamato	"Ōshō Ichidai Koharu Shigure"
1989		Marcia	"Furimukeba Yokohama"
1990		Ninja	"Omatsuri Ninja"

== Best Hit Song Award ==
Year		Artist	Song
1974	1	Tonosama Kings	"Namida no Misao"
1974	2	Masatoshi Nakamura	"Fureai"
1975	1	Hiroshi Kamayatsu	"Waga Yoki Tomo yo"
1975	2	Akira Fuse	"Cyclamen no Kaori"
1976		Masato Shimon	"Oyoge! Taiyaki-kun"
1977		Pink Lady	"Nagisa no Sindbad"
1978		Pink Lady	"UFO"
1979		Jirō Atsumi	"Yume Oi Zake"
1980		Monta & Brothers	"Dancing All Night"
1981		Tetsuya Ryū	"Okuhida Bojō"
1982		Hiromi Iwasaki	"Madonna-tachi no Lullaby"
1983		Eisaku Ōkawa	"Sazanka no Yado"
1984		Akina Nakamori	"Kita Wing"
1985		Akina Nakamori	"Kazari ja Nai no yo Namida wa"
1986		Akina Nakamori	"Desire (Jōnetsu)"
1987		Yōko Oginome	"Roppongi Junjōha"
1988		Hikaru Genji	
1989		Princess Princess	"Diamonds"
1990			

== Audience Award ==
Year		Artist	Song
1974	1	Hiroshi Itsuki	
1974	2	Hiroshi Itsuki	
1975	1	Hiroshi Itsuki	
1975	2	Hiroshi Itsuki	
1976		Hiroshi Itsuki	
1977		Sayuri Ishikawa	"Tsugaru Kaikyō Fuyugeshiki"
1978		Momoe Yamaguchi	"Playback Part 2"
1979		Momoe Yamaguchi	"Shinayaka ni Utatte"
1980		Aki Yashiro	"Ame no Bojō"
1981		Hiroshi Itsuki	"Minato Hitori Uta"
1982		Takashi Hosokawa	"Kita Sakaba"
1983		Hiroshi Itsuki	"Sasame Yuki"
1984		Takashi Hosokawa	"Naniwa Bushi dayo Jinsei wa"
1985		Hiroshi Itsuki	"Soshite... Meguri Ai"
1986		Hiroshi Itsuki	"Naniwa Sakazuki"
1987		Hiroshi Itsuki	"Tsuioku"
1988		Hiroshi Itsuki	"Minato no Gobanchō"
1989		Sayuri Ishikawa	"Kaze no Bon Koi Uta"
1990			

== Best Kayōkyoku Award ==
Year		Artist	Song
1974	1	Goro Noguchi	"Kokuhaku"
1974	2	Momoe Yamaguchi	"Hito Natsu no Keiken"
1975	1	Momoe Yamaguchi	"Fuyu no Iro"
1975	2	Junko Sakurada	"Tenshi no Kuchibiru"
1976		Naoko Ken	"Abayo"
1977		Momoe Yamaguchi	"Kosumosu"
1978		Momoe Yamaguchi	"Playback Part 2"

== Special Award ==
Year		Artist	Song
1974	1	Michiyo Azusa	"Futari de Osake o"
1974	1	Kaguyahime	"Imōto"
1974	1	Saori Yuki	"Michishio"
1974	2	Grape	"Shōryō Nagashi"
1974	2	Kayo Ishū	"Oshiete"
1975	1	Kenji Sawada	"Pari ni Hitori"
1975	1	Down Town Boogie Woogie Band	"Smokin' Boogie" "Minato no Yōko Yokohama Yokosuka"
1975	2	Hiroshi Uchiyamada and Cool Five	"Nakanoshima Blues"
1976		Toshirō Ōmi	"Yu no Machi Elegy"
1976		Yuriko Futaba	"Ganpeki no Haha"
1976		Hibari Misora	"Zassō no Uta"
1977		Hiroshi Itsuki	
1977		Beauty Pair	
1978		Hiromi Go & Kirin Kiki	"Ringo Satsujin Jiken"
1978		Hiroshi Itsuki	5th Anniversary Special Award
1978		Akira Fuse	5th Anniversary Special Award
1978		Miyako Harumi	5th Anniversary Special Award
1978		Sayuri Ishikawa	5th Anniversary Special Award
1979		Godiego	"Beautiful Name" "Ginga Tetsu Dō 999"
1979		Akiko Kanazawa	"Tsugaru Jongara Bushi"
1980		Yellow Magic Orchestra	"Rydeen"
1980		Momoe Yamaguchi	
1981		Hiroshi Itsuki	
1982		—N/a	
1983		Kenji Sawada	10th Anniversary Special Award
1983		Hideki Saijo	10th Anniversary Special Award
1983		Hiroshi Itsuki	10th Anniversary Special Award
1984		Kenny Loggins	"Footloose"
1984		Issei Fuubi Sepia	"Zenryaku, Dō no Ue yori"
1984		Jackie Chan	"I Love You, You, You"
1985		Onyanko Club	"Sailor-fuku o Nugasanai de"
1985		Tunnels	"Ame no Nishi Azabu"
1985		Shinichi Mori	"Onna mo yō"
1986		Onyanko Club	"Melody"
1986		Akemi Ishii Finzy Kontini	"Cha-cha-cha"
1986		Saburō Kitajima	"Kita no Ryōba"
1987		Hikaru Genji	"Star Light"
1987		Sayuri Ishikawa	"Tsugaru Kaikyō Fuyugeshiki"
1987		A-ha	"The Living Daylights"
1988		Ken Shimura to Daijoubu da Family	"Unjarage"
1988		Hiroshi Itsuki	15th Anniversary Special Award
1989		Hibari Misora	"Kawa no Nagare no Yō ni"
1989		CoCo	"Equal Romance"
1990			

== Ceremonies ==
#		Date	Title	Host(s)		Mediator	Venue	Average Rating	Highest Rating
#		Date	Title	Male Host	Female Host	Mediator	Venue	Average Rating	Highest Rating
1	1	1974-07-02	1974 FNS Music Festival	Hiroshi Ogawa	Sayuri Yoshinaga	Daisuke Kobayashi	Imperial Hotel, Tokyo	26.2%	—N/a
1	2	1974-07-18	1974 FNS Music Festival	Hiroshi Ogawa	Sayuri Yoshinaga	Daisuke Kobayashi	Nihon Gekijo	34.0%	—N/a
2	1	1974-12-10	1974 FNS Music Festival	Hiroshi Ogawa	Sayuri Yoshinaga	Daisuke Kobayashi	Imperial Hotel, Tokyo		—N/a
2	2	1974-12-19	1974 FNS Music Festival	Hiroshi Ogawa	Sayuri Yoshinaga	Daisuke Kobayashi	Shinjuku Koma Theater	26.4%	—N/a
3	1	1975-07-01	1975 FNS Music Festival	Hiroshi Ogawa	Sayuri Yoshinaga	Daisuke Kobayashi; Toru Iwasa	Keio Plaza Hotel	25.9%	—N/a
3	2	1975-07-17	1975 FNS Music Festival	Hiroshi Ogawa	Sayuri Yoshinaga	Daisuke Kobayashi; Toru Iwasa	Nakano Sun Plaza	22.3%	—N/a
4	1	1975-12-02	1975 FNS Music Festival	Hiroshi Ogawa	Sayuri Yoshinaga	Daisuke Kobayashi; Toru Iwasa	Fuji TV Kawadacho Building	28.8%	—N/a
4	2	1975-12-16	1975 FNS Music Festival	Hiroshi Ogawa	Sayuri Yoshinaga	Daisuke Kobayashi; Toru Iwasa	Nakano Sun Plaza	30.3%	—N/a
5	1	1976-12-10	1976 FNS Music Festival	Hiroshi Ogawa	Yōko Asaji	—N/a	Fuji TV Kawadacho Building	—N/a	—N/a
5	2	1976-12-29	1976 FNS Music Festival	Hiroshi Ogawa	Yōko Asaji	—N/a	Nakano Sun Plaza	28.2%	—N/a
6	1	1977-12-06	1977 FNS Music Festival	Hiroshi Sekiguchi	Mari Yoshimura	—N/a	Fuji TV Kawadacho Building	30.6%	—N/a
6	2	1977-12-20	1977 FNS Music Festival	Hiroshi Sekiguchi	Mari Yoshimura	—N/a	Nakano Sun Plaza	36.0%	41.7%
7	1	1978-12-05	1978 FNS Music Festival	Shigeru Tsuyuki	Mari Yoshimura	—N/a	Nakano Sun Plaza	—N/a	—N/a
7	2	1978-12-18	1978 FNS Music Festival	Shigeru Tsuyuki	Mari Yoshimura	—N/a	Nippon Budokan	—N/a	—N/a
8	1	1979-12-04	1979 FNS Music Festival	Shigeru Tsuyuki	Mari Yoshimura	—N/a	Nakano Sun Plaza	—N/a	—N/a
8	2	1979-12-19	1979 FNS Music Festival	Shigeru Tsuyuki	Mari Yoshimura	—N/a	Nippon Budokan	—N/a	—N/a
9	1	1980-12-02	1980 FNS Music Festival	Shigeru Tsuyuki	Mari Yoshimura	—N/a	Nakano Sun Plaza	—N/a	—N/a
9	2	1980-12-16	1980 FNS Music Festival	Shigeru Tsuyuki	Mari Yoshimura	—N/a	Nippon Budokan	—N/a	—N/a
10	1	1981-12-01	1981 FNS Music Festival	Shigeru Tsuyuki	Mari Yoshimura	—N/a	Nakano Sun Plaza	26.3%	—N/a
10	2	1981-12-15	1981 FNS Music Festival	Shigeru Tsuyuki	Mari Yoshimura	—N/a	Nippon Budokan	29.2%	—N/a
11	1	1982-12-07	1982 FNS Music Festival	Shigeru Tsuyuki	Mari Yoshimura	—N/a	Nakano Sun Plaza	24.1%	—N/a
11	2	1982-12-21	1982 FNS Music Festival	Shigeru Tsuyuki	Mari Yoshimura	—N/a	Nippon Budokan	28.3%	—N/a
12	1	1983-12-06	1983 FNS Music Festival	Shigeru Tsuyuki	Mari Yoshimura	—N/a	Nakano Sun Plaza	20.1%	—N/a
12	2	1983-12-20	1983 FNS Music Festival	Shigeru Tsuyuki	Mari Yoshimura	—N/a	Nippon Budokan	26.6%	—N/a
13	1	1984-12-04	1984 FNS Music Festival	Shigeru Tsuyuki	Mari Yoshimura	—N/a	Nakano Sun Plaza	23.4%	—N/a
13	2	1984-12-18	1984 FNS Music Festival	Shigeru Tsuyuki	Mari Yoshimura	—N/a	Nippon Budokan	22.8%	—N/a
14	1	1985-12-03	1985 FNS Music Festival	Shigeru Tsuyuki	Mari Yoshimura	—N/a	Nakano Sun Plaza	19.1%	—N/a
14	2	1985-12-17	1985 FNS Music Festival	Shigeru Tsuyuki	Mari Yoshimura	—N/a	Nippon Budokan	21.2%	—N/a
15		1986-12-16	1986 FNS Music Festival	Shigeru Tsuyuki	Mari Yoshimura	—N/a	Nippon Budokan	24.4%	—N/a
16		1987-12-08	1987 FNS Music Festival	Shigeru Tsuyuki; Ichiro Furutachi	—N/a	—N/a	Nippon Budokan	24.8%	—N/a
17		1988-12-06	1988 FNS Music Festival	Shigeru Tsuyuki; Ichiro Furutachi	—N/a	—N/a	Fuji TV Kawadacho Building	—N/a	—N/a
18		1989-12-12	1989 FNS Music Festival	Shigeru Tsuyuki; Ichiro Furutachi	—N/a	—N/a	Nippon Budokan	—N/a	—N/a
19		1990-12-11	1990 FNS Music Festival	Shigeru Tsuyuki	Rieko Kusuta	—N/a	Nippon Budokan	—N/a	—N/a
20		1991-12-10	1991 FNS Music Festival	Shigeru Tsuyuki	Rieko Kusuta	—N/a	Grand Prince Hotel New Takanawa	27.6%	32.2%
21		1992-12-08	1992 FNS Music Festival	Shigeru Tsuyuki	Rieko Kusuta	—N/a	Grand Prince Hotel New Takanawa	26.4%	—N/a
22		1993-12-07	1993 FNS Music Festival	Shigeru Tsuyuki	Rieko Kusuta	—N/a	Grand Prince Hotel New Takanawa	—N/a	—N/a
23		1994-12-06	1994 FNS Music Festival	Shigeru Tsuyuki	Rieko Kusuta	—N/a	Grand Prince Hotel New Takanawa	—N/a	—N/a
24		1995-12-05	1995 FNS Music Festival	Shigeru Tsuyuki	Rieko Kusuta	—N/a	Grand Prince Hotel New Takanawa	—N/a	—N/a
25		1996-12-10	1996 FNS Music Festival	Kenji Kawabata	Rieko Kusuta	—N/a	Yokohama Arena	24.0%	—N/a
26		1997-12-11	1997 FNS Music Festival	Kenji Kawabata	Rieko Kusuta	—N/a	Yokohama Arena	21.7%	—N/a
27		1998-12-03	1998 FNS Music Festival	Kenji Kawabata	Rieko Kusuta	—N/a	Grand Prince Hotel New Takanawa	19.7%	—N/a
28		1999-12-02	1999 FNS Music Festival	Kenji Kawabata	Rieko Kusuta	—N/a	Grand Prince Hotel New Takanawa	22.2%	—N/a
29		2000-12-07	2000 FNS Music Festival	Kenji Kawabata	Rieko Kusuta	—N/a	Grand Prince Hotel New Takanawa	22.5%	—N/a
30		2001-12-06	2001 FNS Music Festival	Kenji Kawabata	Rieko Kusuta	—N/a	Grand Prince Hotel New Takanawa	16.3%	—N/a
31		2002-12-05	2002 FNS Music Festival	Kenji Kawabata	Rieko Kusuta	—N/a	Grand Prince Hotel New Takanawa	19.0%	—N/a
32		2003-12-03	2003 FNS Music Festival	Kenji Kawabata	Rieko Kusuta	—N/a	Grand Prince Hotel New Takanawa	21.2%	—N/a
33		2004-12-01	2004 FNS Music Festival	Kenji Kawabata	Rieko Kusuta	—N/a	Grand Prince Hotel New Takanawa	21.8%	—N/a
34		2005-12-07	2005 FNS Music Festival	Tsuyoshi Kusanagi	Hitomi Kuroki	Kenji Kawabata	Grand Prince Hotel New Takanawa	20.1%	—N/a
35		2006-12-06	2006 FNS Music Festival	Tsuyoshi Kusanagi	Hitomi Kuroki	Kenji Kawabata; Aya Takashima	Grand Prince Hotel New Takanawa	21.3%	—N/a
36		2007-12-05	2007 FNS Music Festival	Tsuyoshi Kusanagi	Hitomi Kuroki	Kenji Kawabata; Aya Takashima	Grand Prince Hotel New Takanawa	20.7%	—N/a
37		2008-12-03	2008 FNS Music Festival	—N/a	Hitomi Kuroki	Kenji Kawabata; Aya Takashima	Grand Prince Hotel New Takanawa	19.7%	—N/a
38		2009-12-02	2009 FNS Music Festival	Tsuyoshi Kusanagi	Hitomi Kuroki	Kenji Kawabata; Aya Takashima	Grand Prince Hotel New Takanawa	18.5%	—N/a
39		2010-12-04	2010 FNS Music Festival	Tsuyoshi Kusanagi	—N/a	Kenji Kawabata; Aya Takashima	Grand Prince Hotel New Takanawa	21.7%	29.4%
40		2011-12-07	2011 FNS Music Festival	Tsuyoshi Kusanagi	Aya Takashima	Kenji Kawabata	Grand Prince Hotel New Takanawa	19.9%	26.0%
41		2012-12-05	2012 FNS Music Festival	Tsuyoshi Kusanagi	Aya Takashima	—N/a	Grand Prince Hotel New Takanawa	18.3%	22.8%
42		2013-12-04	2013 FNS Music Festival	Tsuyoshi Kusanagi	Christel Takigawa	—N/a	Grand Prince Hotel New Takanawa	18.8%	24.4%
43		2014-12-03	2014 FNS Music Festival	Tsuyoshi Kusanagi	Aya Takashima; Ayako Kato	—N/a	Grand Prince Hotel New Takanawa; Fuji TV V5 Studio (2nd part)	15.4%	19.7%
44	1	2015-12-02	2015 FNS Music Festival	Ken Watabe	Chisato Moritaka	Shinichi Karube	Grand Prince Hotel New Takanawa	16.1%	20.3%
44	2	2015-12-16	2015 FNS Music Festival	Ken Watabe	Chisato Moritaka	Shinichi Karube	Fuji TV Special Studio	13.5%	—N/a
45	1	2016-12-07	2016 FNS Music Festival	Ken Watabe	Chisato Moritaka	Ayako Kato	Grand Prince Hotel New Takanawa	12.6%	15.7%
45	2	2016-12-14	2016 FNS Music Festival	Ken Watabe	Chisato Moritaka	Ayako Kato	Fuji TV Special Studio	11.6%	16.8%
46	1	2017-12-06	2017 FNS Music Festival	Ken Watabe	Chisato Moritaka; Ayako Kato	—N/a	Grand Prince Hotel New Takanawa	13.6%	—N/a
46	2	2017-12-13	2017 FNS Music Festival	Ken Watabe	Chisato Moritaka; Ayako Kato	—N/a	Fuji TV Special Studio	11.1%	—N/a
47	1	2018-12-05	2018 FNS Music Festival	Ken Watabe	Chisato Moritaka; Ayako Kato	—N/a	Grand Prince Hotel New Takanawa		—N/a
47	2	2018-12-12	2018 FNS Music Festival	Ken Watabe	Chisato Moritaka; Ayako Kato	—N/a	Fuji TV Special Studio		—N/a
48	1	2019-12-04	2019 FNS Music Festival	Masaki Aiba	Yūmi Nagashima	—N/a	Grand Prince Hotel New Takanawa		—N/a
48	2	2019-12-11	2019 FNS Music Festival	Masaki Aiba	Yūmi Nagashima	—N/a	Fuji TV Special Studio		—N/a
sp		2020-08-26	2020 FNS Music Festival "Natsu"	Masaki Aiba	Yūmi Nagashima	—N/a	Fuji TV Special Studio		—N/a
49	1	2020-12-02	2020 FNS Music Festival	Masaki Aiba	Yūmi Nagashima	—N/a	Fuji TV Special Studio		—N/a
49	2	2020-12-09	2020 FNS Music Festival	Masaki Aiba	Yūmi Nagashima	—N/a	Fuji TV Special Studio		—N/a
sp		2021-07-14	2021 FNS Music Festival "Natsu"	Masaki Aiba	Yūmi Nagashima	—N/a	Fuji TV Special Studio		—N/a
sp		2021-10-06	2021 FNS Music Festival "Aki"	Masaki Aiba	Yūmi Nagashima	—N/a	Fuji TV Special Studio		—N/a
50	1	2021-12-01	2021 FNS Music Festival	Masaki Aiba	Yūmi Nagashima	—N/a	Fuji TV Special Studio		—N/a
50	2	2021-12-08	2021 FNS Music Festival	Masaki Aiba	Yūmi Nagashima	—N/a	Fuji TV Special Studio		—N/a
sp		2022-03-23	2022 FNS Music Festival "Haru"	Masaki Aiba	Yūmi Nagashima	—N/a	Fuji TV Special Studio		—N/a
sp		2022-07-13	2022 FNS Music Festival "Natsu"	Masaki Aiba	Yūmi Nagashima	—N/a	Fuji TV Special Studio		—N/a
51	1	2022-12-07	2022 FNS Music Festival	Masaki Aiba	Yūmi Nagashima	—N/a	Grand Prince Hotel New Takanawa		—N/a
51	2	2022-12-14	2022 FNS Music Festival	Masaki Aiba	Yūmi Nagashima	—N/a	Fuji TV Special Studio		—N/a
sp		2023-07-12	2023 FNS Music Festival "Natsu"	Masaki Aiba	Yūmi Nagashima	—N/a			—N/a
52	1	2023-12-06	2023 FNS Music Festival	Masaki Aiba	Seika Inoue	—N/a			—N/a
52	2	2023-12-13	2023 FNS Music Festival	Masaki Aiba	Seika Inoue	—N/a			—N/a
sp		2024-07-03	2024 FNS Music Festival "Natsu"	Masaki Aiba	Seika Inoue	—N/a			—N/a
53	1	2024-12-04	2024 FNS Music Festival	Masaki Aiba	Seika Inoue	—N/a			—N/a
53	2	2024-12-11	2024 FNS Music Festival	Masaki Aiba	Seika Inoue	—N/a			—N/a
sp		2025-04	2025 FNS Music Festival "Haru"	Cancelled					
sp		2025-07-02	2025 FNS Music Festival "Natsu"	Masaki Aiba	Seika Inoue	—N/a			—N/a
54	1	2025-12-03	2025 FNS Music Festival	Masaki Aiba	Seika Inoue	—N/a			—N/a
54	2	2025-12-10	2025 FNS Music Festival	Masaki Aiba	Seika Inoue	—N/a			—N/a
sp		2026-07-01	2026 FNS Music Festival "Natsu"	Masaki Aiba	Seika Inoue	—N/a			—N/a
55	1	2026-12-02	2026 FNS Music Festival	Masaki Aiba	Seika Inoue	—N/a			—N/a
55	2	2026-12-09	2026 FNS Music Festival	Masaki Aiba	Seika Inoue	—N/a			—N/a

== International guests (1992–present) ==
- a-ha
- Jasmine Ann Allen
- Big Bang
- BoA
- BTS
- Jackie Chan
- Che'Nelle
- Alan Dawa Dolma
- Destiny's Child
- ENHYPEN
- Marty Friedman
- Girls' Generation
- Chris Hart
- Iz*One
- Jero
- Salena Jones
- K
- KARA
- Ben E. King
- Kenny Loggins
- NewJeans
- Judy Ongg
- Park Yong-ha
- Daniel Powter
- Ryu
- SHINee
- Seventeen
- Sting
- Stray Kids
- TOMORROW X TOGETHER
- Treasure
- TVXQ!
- TWICE
- TWS
- TVXQ!

== Notes ==
- 音楽・芸能賞事典 Nichigai Associates ISBN 4-8169-0923-0
- 音楽・芸能賞事典 Nichigai Associates 1990/95 ISBN 4-8169-1377-7
