= Nanpasen =

Single by Akina Nakamori

from the album Best II
- Language: Japanese
- English title: Shipwreck
- B-side: "Koiji"
- Released: September 30, 1987
- Recorded: 1987
- Genre: J-pop; kayōkyoku
- Length: 4:28
- Label: Reprise Records
- Songwriter: Tokiko Kato

Akina Nakamori singles chronology
"Blonde" (1987)	"Nanpasen" (1987)	"Al-Mauj" (1988)

Music videos
- "Nanpasen" (Live) on YouTube

"Nanpasen" (難破船; lit. "Shipwreck") is the 19th single by Japanese singer Akina Nakamori. Written by Tokiko Kato, the single was released on September 30, 1987, by Warner Pioneer through the Reprise label. It was also the third single from her fourth compilation album Best II.

== Background ==
"Nanpasen" was originally recorded by Kato on her 1984 album Saigo no Dance Party (最後のダンスパーティ, Saigo no Dansu Pāti; lit. The Last Dance Party). Three years later, she requested Nakamori to sing the song on her 22nd birthday on a live TV performance. Nakamori also performed the song on the 38th Kōhaku Uta Gassen, making her fifth appearance on NHK's New Year's Eve special.

Kato re-recorded "Nanpasen" on her 1991 compilation Tokiko Best and her 2001 compilation My Best Album Tokiko Today. Nakamori has re-recorded the song for the 1995 compilation True Album Akina 95 Best and her 2007 compilation Ballad Best: 25th Anniversary Selection.

== Chart performance ==
"Nanpasen" became Nakamori's 17th No. 1 on Oricon's weekly singles chart and sold over 413,000 copies.

== Track listing ==
Original release
No.	Title	Lyrics	Music	Arrangement	Length
1.	"Nanpasen" ((難破船; "Shipwreck"))	Tokiko Kato	Kato	Kei Wakakusa	4:28
2.	"Koiji" ((恋路; "Romance"))	Natsuko Kisugi	Tetsuji Hayashi	Mitsuo Hagita	5:09
Total length:					9:37

1998 reissue bonus track
No.	Title	Lyrics	Music	Length
3.	"Nanpasen (Live Version)" ((難破船(LIVE VERSION)))	Kato	Kato

== Charts ==
Chart (1987)	Peak position
Japan (Oricon)	1

== Cover versions ==
- Anita Mui covered the song in Cantonese as "Wúrén yuàn ài wǒ" (無人願愛我, "No One Wants to Love Me") on her 1988 album Mèng lǐ gòng zuì (夢裡共酔, In the Dream).
- Yolinda Yan covered the song in Cantonese on her 1988 album Wú bàn de wǔ (無伴的舞, Unaccompanied Dance).
- Kaori Momoi covered the song on her 1993 cover album More Standard.
- Tomomi Kahara covered the song on her 2014 cover album Memories 2: Kahara All Time Covers. It was featured in the Takashi Miike film Over Your Dead Body.
- Aya Shimazu covered the song on her 2017 cover album Singer 4.
- Kousuke Atari covered the song on his 2019 album Kanasha.
- Ms. Ooja covered the song on her 2020 cover album Nagashi Ooja: Vintage Song Covers.
- Okayu covered the song on her 2021 cover album Okayu Uta: Cover Songs.
- Crazy Ken Band covered the song on their 2021 cover album Sukinanda yo.
- Fuyumi Sakamoto covered the song on her 2021 cover album Love Emotion.
- Mika Nakashima covered the song in Nakamori's 2025 tribute album "Nakamori Akina Tribute Album: Meikyo".

== Release history ==
Year	Format(s)	Serial number	Label(s)	Ref.
1987	7inch LP	L-1755	Warner Pioneer	
1988	8cm CD, CT	10SL-149, 10L5-4058	Warner Pioneer	
1998	12cm CD	WPC6-8676	Warner Pioneer	
2008	Digital download	-	Warner Pioneer	
2014	Digital download - remaster	-	Warner Pioneer	

== See also ==
- 1987 in Japanese music
