= Gypsy Queen (song) =

Single by Akina Nakamori

from the album CD'87
- Language: Japanese
- B-side: "Saigo no Carmen"
- Released: May 26, 1986
- Recorded: 1986
- Genre: J-pop; kayōkyoku
- Length: 4:27
- Label: Reprise Records
- Composer: Wataru Kuniyasu
- Lyricist: Ikki Matsumoto
- Producer: Yūzō Shimada

Akina Nakamori singles chronology
"Desire (Jōnetsu)" (1986)	"Gypsy Queen" (1986)	"Fin" (1986)

Music videos
- "Gypsy Queen" (Live) on YouTube

"Gypsy Queen" (ジプシー・クイーン, Jipushī Kuīn) is the 15th single by Japanese entertainer Akina Nakamori. Written by Ikki Matsumoto and Wataru Kuniyasu, the single was released on May 26, 1986, by Warner Pioneer through the Reprise label. It was also the second single from her third compilation album CD'87.

== Background ==
The first day of recording occurred on 8 April 1986, on the same day, when fellow younger idol-singer Yukiko Okada committed suicide. Knowing this news, Akina was unable to start recording due to intense emotional impact, resulting recording to be finished on the last minute.

Nakamori self-covered the song twice: in 1995, under subtitle "Renewal" and was included in the compilation album True Album Akina 95 Best and in 2024 under subtitle "Jazz version".

== Chart performance ==
The single became Nakamori's 12th No. 1 on Oricon's weekly singles chart and sold over 357,600 copies.

== Track listing ==
Original release
No.	Title	Lyrics	Music	Arrangement	Length
1.	"Gypsy Queen" (Jipushī Kuīn (ジプシー・クイーン))	Ikki Matsumoto	Wataru Kuniyasu	Shingo Kobayashi	4:27
2.	"Saigo no Carmen" (Saigo no Karumen (最後のカルメン; "The Final Carmen"))	Keiko Asō	Takashi Tsushimi	Kazuo Shiina	4:28
Total length:					8:55

1998 reissue bonus track
No.	Title	Lyrics	Music	Length
3.	"Gypsy Queen (Live Version)" ((ジプシー・クイーン(LIVE VERSION)))	Matsumoto	Kuniyasu

== Charts ==
Chart (1986)	Peak position
Japan (Oricon)	1

== Cover versions ==
- Hong-Kong singer Samantha Lam covered the song in Cantonese as "教堂派對" on her 1987 album 因你別離 時光影印機 因我愛你
- Composer Wataru Kuniyasu self-covered the song on his 1988 compilation album Wataru Kuniyasu's Best Hits.
- Yuki Murakami covered the song on her 2014 album Piano Woman: Tomodachi kara.

== Release history ==
Year	Format(s)	Serial number	Label(s)	Ref.
1986	7inch LP	L-1670	Warner Pioneer	
1988	8cm CD, CT	10SL-145, 10L5-4054	Warner Pioneer	
1998	12cm CD	WPC6-8672	Warner Pioneer	
2008	Digital download	-	Warner Pioneer	
2014	Digital download - remaster	-	Warner Pioneer	

== See also ==
- 1986 in Japanese music
