= Tattoo (Akina Nakamori song) =

Single by Akina Nakamori

from the album Best II
- Language: Japanese
- B-side: "Le Poison"
- Released: May 18, 1988
- Recorded: 1988
- Genre: J-pop; kayōkyoku; dance-pop
- Length: 3:57
- Label: Reprise Records
- Composer: Anri Sekine
- Lyricist: Yuri Moriko

Akina Nakamori singles chronology
"Al-Mauj" (1988)	"Tattoo" (1988)	"I Missed the Shock" (1988)

Music videos
- "Tattoo" (Live) on YouTube

"Tattoo" (タトゥー, Tatū) is the 21st single by Japanese entertainer Akina Nakamori. Written by Yuri Moriko and Anri Sekine, the single was released on May 18, 1988, by Warner Pioneer through the Reprise label. It was also the fifth single from her fourth compilation album Best II.

== Background ==
"Tattoo" was used by Orient Watch Co. for their "Orient Clock You" commercial featuring Nakamori.

Nakamori has re-recorded "Tattoo" for the 1995 compilation True Album Akina 95 Best and the 2002 self-cover compilation Utahime Double Decade. In 2024, Nakamori re-recorded the song twice - in July with subtitle "Jazz" and in November in funky style released as a duet promotional single with Shingo Katori.

== Chart performance ==
"Tattoo" became Nakamori's 19th No. 1 on Oricon's weekly singles chart and sold over 296,800 copies.

== Track listing ==
Original release
No.	Title	Lyrics	Music	Arrangement	Length
1.	"Tattoo"	Yuri Moriko	Anri Sekine	Eurox	3:57
2.	"Le Poison" (Lu Puazon (小悪魔（ル・プアゾン）))	Keiko Asō	Masatoshi Nishimura	Jun Miyake	3:50
Total length:					7:47

1998 reissue bonus track
No.	Title	Lyrics	Music	Length
3.	"Tattoo" (Live Version)	Moriko	Sekine

== Charts ==
Chart (1988)	Peak position
Japan (Oricon)	1

== Cover versions ==
- Hoshikuzu Scat covered the song in Nakamori's 2025 tribute album "Nakamori Akina Tribute Album: Meikyo".
- Koda Kumi also covered the song for her album "Eternity: Love & Songs"

== Release history ==
Year	Format(s)	Serial number	Label(s)	Ref.
1988	7inch LP, 8cm CD, CT	L-1757, 10SL-13, 10L5-4060	Warner Pioneer	
1998	12cm CD	WPC6-8678	Warner Pioneer	
2008	Digital download	-	Warner Pioneer	
2014	Digital download - remaster	-	Warner Pioneer	

== See also ==
- 1988 in Japanese music
