= Tango Noir =

Single by Akina Nakamori

from the album CD'87
- Language: Japanese
- B-side: "Milonguita"
- Released: February 4, 1987
- Recorded: 1986
- Genre: J-pop; kayōkyoku; pop rock
- Length: 4:08
- Label: Reprise Records
- Composer: Takashi Tsushimi
- Lyricist: Kayoko Fuyumori

Akina Nakamori singles chronology
"Nonfiction Ecstasy" (1986)	"Tango Noir" (1987)	"Blonde" (1987)

Music videos
- "Tango Noir" (Live) on YouTube

"Tango Noir" (タンゴ・ノアール, Tango Noāru) is the 17th single by Japanese entertainer Akina Nakamori. Written by Kayoko Fuyumori and Takashi Tsushimi, the single was released on February 4, 1987, by Warner Pioneer through the Reprise label. It was also the fourth single from her third compilation album CD'87.

The single became Nakamori's 15th No. 1 on Oricon's weekly singles chart and sold over 358,100 copies.

== Track listing ==
All music is arranged by Satoshi Nakamura

Original release
No.	Title	Lyrics	Music	Length
1.	"Tango Noir"	Kayoko Fuyumori	Takashi Tsushimi	4:08
2.	"Milonguita"	Akira Ōtsu	Tetsuji Hayashi	4:28
Total length:				8:36

1998 reissue bonus track
No.	Title	Lyrics	Music	Length
3.	"Tango Noir" (Live Version)	Fuyumori	Tsushimi

== Cover versions ==
- Cantonese singer Yolinda Yan covered the song in Cantonese on her 1988 album Wú bàn de wǔ (無伴的舞, Unaccompanied Dance).
- East Eden covered the song in Nakamori's 2025 tribute album "Nakamori Akina Tribute Album: Meikyo".

== Charts ==
Chart (1987)	Peak position
Japan (Oricon)	1

== Release history ==
Year	Format(s)	Serial number	Label(s)	Ref.
1987	7inch LP	L-1753	Warner Pioneer	
1988	8cm CD, CT	10SL-147, 10L5-4056	Warner Pioneer	
1998	12cm CD	WPC6-8672	Warner Pioneer	
2008	Digital download	-	Warner Pioneer	
2014	Digital download - remaster	-	Warner Pioneer	

== See also ==
- 1987 in Japanese music
