= Kisaburō Suzuki (musician) =

Japanese music arranger and composer

Kisaburō Suzuki (鈴木 キサブロー, Suzuki Kisaburō, born 14 February 1953) is a Japanese J-pop songwriter and guitarist.

== Biography ==
Born in Hirosaki, Aomori Prefecture, Japan, Suzuki studied at the South Hirosaki High School.

Suzuki was most active in the 1980s and wrote for many performers. His 1982 song for you… was performed by Mariko Takahashi; a Cantonese translation of this song, 霧之戀 was performed by the Hong Kong singer Alan Tam. In 1986, his song DESIRE, performed by Akina Nakamori, won the top prize at the 28th Japan Record Awards.
