= Unbalance+Balance =

Studio album by Akina Nakamori
- Released: 22 September 1993; 4 December 2002 (as Unbalance+Balance+6)
- Recorded: 1992–1993
- Studio: Victor Studio; Music Inn; Cherry Island Studio
- Genre: J-pop
- Length: 42:47 (original); 72:46 (reissue)
- Language: Japanese
- Label: MCA Victor
- Producer: Akina Nakamori

Akina Nakamori chronology
Best III (1992)	Unbalance+Balance (1993)	Utahime (1994)

Singles from Unbalance+Balance
- 1. "Not Crazy to Me" Released: 21 May 1993; 2. "Aibu" Released: 24 March 1994

Unbalance+Balance is the fifteenth studio album by Japanese singer-producer Akina Nakamori. And her first studio album to be released during the 1990s. It was released on 22 September 1993, by MCA Victor.

The album includes the double A-side singles "Not Crazy to Me" (coupled with "Everlasting Love" and "Aibu") (coupled with "Kataomoi").

In 2002 was released re-printed version of the album Unbalance+Balance+6, which includes the original version of "Not Crazy to Me", the single "Everlasting Love", "Yoru no Dokoka de", and B-sides "Rose Bud" and "Blue Lace", which was previously unreleased from the album sessions.

== Background ==
Unbalance+Balance is Nakamori's first studio album to be released after four years and on a new recording label.

The first production of the album started in summer 1992, after Nakamori finished filming television drama Sugao no Mama de. According to recording producer, Nakamori's distanced from her casual style and along with new music production staff aimed more into contemporary style.

Some of the past musical writers were involved with the album, including Takashi Matsumoto, Makoto Sekiguchi from C-C-B, Koji Tamaki from Anzen Chitai and Brazilian singer-songwriter Osny Melo. Among new team includes well-known names as Ryuuichi Sakamoto, Nokko from Rebecca and Tetsuya Komuro. Composer Akira Senju later become the main producer of the series of cover albums "Utahime".

With this album, Nakamori began to be in the charge of producing her albums. It is her second self-produced album for the first time in seven years.

It was Nakamori's idea to write two songs with same melody yet different lyrics: Eien no Tobira was written by Natsuno Serino and Kagerou by Nakamori herself. It's Nakamori's first original song for first time in 9 years.

Aibu was later recorded as a B-side on the cover single "Kataomoi" in 1994.

== Promotion ==
=== Single ===
The album consists of one previously released single.

"Not Crazy to Me" is a B-side take from Nakamori's twenty-seventh single "Everlasting Love". It was written by Nokko and produced by Ryuuichi Sakamoto. It was released on 21 May 1993. It was Nakamori's the first single to be released in two years under new recording label. It includes a new melodical arrangement to the original. The original version was included on the reissue version of album, Unbalance+Balance+6 and the compilation album Utahime Densetsu: 90's Best.

The single debuted at number 10 on the weekly Oricon Singles Chart and was Nakamori's final single to be released in compact disc format.

== Stage performances ==
While the singles "Gekka" and "Aibu" were performed on later live tours and music television programs, the album tracks "Kurobara" was performed during the one-night live Parco Theatre Live in 1994; "Norma Jean" on the Spoon tour in 1998; and "Eien no Tobira" and "Hikaru no Nai Mangekyō" were performed for the first time on the acoustic 21 Seiki he no Tabidachi tour. Kagerou was performed very often as well: Parco Theatre Live, True Akina Live in 1995 and acoustic live tour 21 Seiki he no Tabidachi.

== Chart performance ==
The album reached at number 4 on the Oricon Album Weekly Chart charted for nine consecutive weeks with sales of 186,600 copies. Re-issue version of the album debut at number 58 on the Billboard Japan's Weekly album Charts.

== Track listing ==
Unbalance+Balance track listing
No.	Title	Lyrics	Music	Arranger(s)	Length
1.	"Eien no Tobira (永遠の扉)"	Seriko Natsuno	Koji Tamaki (Anzen Chitai)	Akira Senju	7:13
2.	"Aibu (愛撫)"	Takashi Matsumoto	Tetsuya Komuro	Komuro	5:14
3.	"Kurobara (黒薔薇)"	Matsumoto	Osny Melo	Melo	4:19
4.	"You Are Everything"	Megumi Ayukawa	Melo	Melo	4:35
5.	"Hikari no nai Mangekyō (光のない万華鏡)"	Akina Nakamori	Makoto Sekiguchi (ex.C-C-B)	Melo	1:05
6.	"Nemuru Yori Nakitai Yoru ni (眠るより泣きたい夜に)"	Natsuno	Bro.KORN	Melo	4:41
7.	"Norma Jean"	Matsumoto	Komuro	Komuro	5:31
8.	"Not Crazy to Me" (LP edit)	Nokko	Ryuuichi Sakamoto	Sakamoto	4:45
9.	"Kagerou (陽炎)"	Nakamori	Tamaki	Yuuji Toriyama	5:28

Unbalance+Balance+6 track listing
No.	Title	Lyrics	Music	Arranger(s)	Length
10.	"Everlasting Love"	Taeko Onuki	Sakamoto	Sakamoto	4:50
11.	"Not Crazy to Me"	Nokko	Sakamoto	Sakamoto	4:35
12.	"Yoru no Doko ka de (Night Shift) (夜のどこかで)"	Natsuno	Tsugutoshi Gotō	Gotō	5:46
13.	"Rose Bud"	Natsuno	Gotō	Gotō	5:15
14.	"Gekka (月華)"	Goro Matsui	Shuugou Kajiwara	Akihiko Matsumoto	5:00
15.	"Blue Lace"	Ayukawa	Akemi Krivit	Etsuko Yamakawa	4:41

== Release history ==
Year	Format(s)	Serial number	Label(s)	Ref.
1993	CT, CD, DCC	MVTD-4, MVXD-7, MVCD-9	MCA	
2002	CD, digital download	UMCK-1149	UMJ	
2017	UHQCD	UPCH-7267	UMJ	
2023	LP, CD	UPCY-7836, UPJY-9337/8	UMJ	

Notes:

- Re-releases since 2002 always includes additional 6 tracks, which were not included during its the first release time
