= Kokuhaku Jikkō Iinkai: Ren'ai Series =

Japanese Vocaloid song series

- Confession Executive Committee: Love Series

告白実行委員会〜恋愛シリーズ〜 (Kokuhaku Jikkō Iinkai: Ren'ai Shirīzu)
- Genre: Romance
- Created by: HoneyWorks
- Light novel
- Written by: Tōko Fujitani (vol. 1–6); Mari Kousaka (vol. 5, 7–)
- Illustrated by: Yamako
- Published by: Kadokawa Shoten
- Imprint: Kadokawa Beans Bunko
- Original run: February 1, 2014 – present
- Volumes: 16
- Anime television series

Our love has always been 10 centimeters apart
- Directed by: Hitoshi Nanba (Note: Credited as Chief Director (総監督, Sō Kantoku).); Takurō Tsukada
- Music by: HoneyWorks
- Studio: Lay-duce
- Licensed by: NA: Aniplex of America
- Original network: Tokyo MX, BS11
- English network: SEA: Animax Asia
- Original run: November 24, 2017 – December 30, 2017
- Episodes: 6
- Anime film

Kono Sekai no Tanoshimikata: Secret Story Film
- Directed by: Fumie Moroi
- Written by: Yoshimi Narita
- Music by: HoneyWorks; Moe Hyūga
- Studio: CLAP
- Released: December 25, 2020
- Manga

Watashi, Idol Sengen
- Written by: Mogelatte
- Illustrated by: Mogelatte
- Published by: B's Log
- Magazine: Piccoma
- Original run: March 15, 2020 – present
- Volumes: 3
- Anime television series
- Heroines Run the Show (2022)
- Anime films
- Zutto Mae Kara Suki Deshita (2016); Suki ni Naru Sono Shunkan o (2016)
- icon

Kokuhaku Jikkō Iinkai: Ren'ai Series (告白実行委員会〜恋愛シリーズ〜; transl. Confession Executive Committee: Love Series) is a Japanese romance Vocaloid song series by HoneyWorks. The project's first song on Nico Nico Douga was a music video sung by Vocaloid Gumi titled "Hatsukoi no Ehon" (初恋の絵本) that was released on November 18, 2011. The songs have spawned into various media forms including manga, novel, and anime adaptations.

Two anime films titled Zutto Mae Kara Suki Deshita and Suki ni Naru Sono Shunkan o were released in 2016. An anime television series by Lay-duce titled Our love has always been 10 centimeters apart aired from November to December 2017. A third anime film titled Kono Sekai no Tanoshimikata: Secret Story Film was released on December 25, 2020. A second anime television series titled Heroines Run the Show aired from April to June 2022.

== Plot ==
The initial plot of Kokuhaku Jikkō Iinkai tells the love stories of six third-year high school students: childhood friends Natsuki Enomoto, Yu Setoguchi, Sota Mochizuki, and Haruki Serizawa, and their later high school friends Akari Hayasaka and Mio Aida. Later in the series' lifetime, the story branches to other love and friendship dilemmas from succeeding groups of Sakuragaoka High School students. The stories focus on conflict and how hard it can be to confess one's love during youth days, the sweetness of being in love, and the hardships of maintaining the relationship as the pairs grow older or pursue their goals.

In 2019, HoneyWorks officially labelled a set of music-themed installments (which had videos from as early as 2017) as the Idol Series. While this spinoff still retains characters previously seen in the Ren'ai Series and is set in the same universe, the Idol Series is primarily about the rise and growth of different teen idol acts. Some videos will also explore the performers' backstories and their desire to better themselves. Many videos in this spinoff are diegetic, as music videos for a performer's single out of universe will be real music videos in-universe.

== Characters ==
=== Third Year Students ===
Natsuki Enomoto (榎本 夏樹, Enomoto Natsuki)
Voiced by: Haruka Tomatsu
Natsuki is the main protagonist of Zutto Mae Kara Suki Deshita and a boisterous third-year student who is friendly to everyone. She is in love with her childhood friend Yu, but she fears that if he rejects her confession, their friendship will be ruined. To save face, she lies to him by stating that he is her practice confession partner. Her main songs are "Kokuhaku Yokō Renshū" (告白予行練習), "Byōmei Koi Wazurai" (病名恋ワズライ), "Tokyo Summer Session" (東京サマーセッション), "Tokyo Winter Session" (東京ウインターセッション), "Tokyo Autumn Session" (東京オータムセッション), and "Destiny."
Yu Setoguchi (瀬戸口 優, Setoguchi Yū)
Voiced by: Hiroshi Kamiya
Natsuki's childhood friend and the president of the Movie Research Club. He is secretly in love with Natsuki, but unsure if the feeling is mutual. His main songs are "Kokuhaku Yokō Renshū ~Another Story~" (告白予行練習〜another story〜), "Terekakushi Shinshuki" (テレカクシ思春期), "Tokyo Summer Session" (東京サマーセッション), "Tokyo Winter Session" (東京ウインターセッション), "Tokyo Autumn Session" (東京オータムセッション), and "Terekakushi Kinenbi" (テレカクシ思春期).
Akari Hayasaka (早坂 あかり, Hayasaka Akari)
Voiced by: Kana Asumi
The president of the Art Club. A beautiful and nice, yet sort of clumsy girl, nobody knows what she is actually thinking. Even though she admires the concept of love, she has never experienced falling in love herself. Her main songs are "Yakimochi no Kotae ~Another Story~ (ヤキモチの答え〜another story〜), "Tokyo Summer Session" (東京サマーセッション), "Tokyo Winter Session" (東京ウインターセッション), "Tokyo Autumn Session" (東京オータムセッション), and "Watashi ga Koi o Shiru Hi" (私が恋を知る日).
Sota Mochizuki (望月 蒼太, Mochizuki Sōta)
Voiced by: Yūki Kaji
The vice president of the Movie Research Club, nicknamed "Mochita," falls in love with Akari and gets easily jealous of other guys approaching her. His main songs are "Yakimochi no Kotae" (ヤキモチの答え), "Tokyo Summer Session" (東京サマーセッション), "Tokyo Winter Session" (東京ウインターセッション), "Tokyo Autumn Session" (東京オータムセッション), and "Boku ga Namae o Yobu Hi" (僕が名前を呼ぶ日).
Miou Aida (合田 美桜, Aida Miou)
Voiced by: Aki Toyosaki
Miou is the main protagonist of Itsudatte Bokura no Koi wa 10 cm Datta and the vice president of the Art Club. A gentle, shy, and discreet girl. She is not good at talking with boys, but she gets along with Haruki. As a result of their closeness, they are rumored to be dating. They deny the rumors while struggling to confess their feelings to each other. Mio's main songs are "Hatsukoi no Ehon" (初恋の絵本), "Mirai-zu" (未来図), "Tokyo Summer Session" (東京サマーセッション), "Tokyo Winter Session" (東京ウインターセッション), "Tokyo Autumn Session" (東京オータムセッション), and "Ippun'ichibyō Kimi to Boku no" (一分一秒君と僕の).
Haruki Serizawa (芹沢 春輝, Serizawa Haruki)
Voiced by: Kenichi Suzumura, Koinu (childhood)
A member of the Movie Research Club. His blond hair and sharp eyes lead others to believe he is a bad student. He falls in love with Miou, and though they act like a couple, they are unable to confess their feelings to each other. His main songs are Hatsukoi no Ehon ~another story~" (初恋の絵本〜another story〜), "Inokori-sensei" (イノコリ先生), "Sayonara Ryo-Kataomoi" (さよなら両片想), "Tokyo Summer Session" (東京サマーセッション), "Tokyo Winter Session" (東京ウインターセッション), "Tokyo Autumn Session" (東京オータムセッション), and "Ippun'ichibyō Kimi to Boku no" (一分一秒君と僕の).
Sena Narumi (成海 聖奈, Narumi Sena)
Voiced by: Sora Amamiya
A girl who works as a model outside of school. Unbeknownst to Midori, she has noticed him too and wants to talk to him. Her main songs are "Kin'yōbi no Ohayō ~Another Story~" (金曜日のおはよう〜another story〜), "Kawaiku Naritai" (可愛くなりたい), "Nichiyōbi no Himitsu" (日曜日の秘密), and "Watashi no Tenshi" (ワタシノテンシ), which is about the relationship to her younger sister Mona.
Koyuki Ayase (綾瀬 恋雪, Ayase Koyuki)
Voiced by: Tsubasa Yonaga (2014-2023), Shun Horie (2023-present)
A member of the Horticulture Club. A boy with long hair and glasses who changed his appearance during his third year in high school after being teased for his feminine looks. Natsuki never teased him, and because of this, he is in love with her, but he is aware of Natsuki and Yu's mutual feelings toward each other. He eventually becomes a florist and finds love in college. His main songs are "Kokuhaku Rival Sengen" (告白ライバル宣言), "Senpai." (センパイ), and "Toshi no Sa Nante" (年の差なんて).
Midori Hamanaka (濱中 翠, Hamanaka Midori)
Voiced by: Gero
Haruki's best friend, who moved from Kansai before entering high school. He speaks in a Kansai dialect. He recognized Sena on his commute by train to school and has wanted to talk to her, but cannot muster the courage to do so. His main songs are "Kin'yōbi no Ohayō" (金曜日のおはよう) and "Nichiyōbi no Himitsu" (日曜日の秘密), and he is considered the co-protagonist of the Youbi (曜日) series sub-branch.

=== First Year Students ===
Hina Setoguchi (瀬戸口 雛, Setoguchi Hina)
Voiced by: Momo Asakura
Hina is the main protagonist of Suki ni Naru Sono Shunkan o and Yu's younger sister by two years. She styles her pink hair in twin pigtails. During her first year in middle school, she met Koyuki and, despite a disastrous first encounter full of misunderstandings, the two became friends, and she fell in love with him. She wants to confess her feelings, but she knows that Koyuki is in love with someone else. She later develops feelings for Kotaro and begins dating him in her twenties. Her main songs are "Ima Suki ni Naru" (今好きになる), "Sankaku Jealousy ~Another Story" (三角ジェラシー〜another story〜), "Senpai." (センパイ。), "Daikirai na Hazudatta." (大嫌いなはずだった。), and "Erande Kurete Arigatou." (選んでくれてありがとう。).
Kotaro Enomoto (榎本 虎太朗, Enomoto Kotarō)
Voiced by: Natsuki Hanae
Natsuki's younger brother by two years. He has trouble being honest, and his words sometimes end up hurting people. He is in love with Hina, but after he learns that Hina loves Koyuki, he tries to help her with her confession. He and Hina become a couple in their twenties. His main songs are "Sankaku Jealousy" (三角ジェラシー), "Ima Suki ni Naru ~Triangle Story~" (今好きになる〜triangle story〜), "Daikirai na Hazudatta." (大嫌いなはずだった。), and "Erande Kurete Arigatou." (選んでくれてありがとう。).
Arisa Takamizawa (高見沢 アリサ, Takamizawa Arisa)
Voiced by: Nao Tōyama
A girl with short bangs and a twin-tail hairstyle. In middle school, she helped her classmate avoid being bullied, but ended up getting bullied herself. She admires Sena and wears her hair the same way Sena does. She disapproves of Ken's womanizing behavior, and after criticizing his behavior, he takes an interest in her. She starts to like him, but his flirty ways and many girlfriends discourage her from acting on her feelings. Her main songs are "Heart no Shuchō" (ハートの主張) and "Ijiwaru na Deai" (イジワルな出会い).
Ken Shibasaki (柴崎 健, Shibasaki Ken)
Voiced by: Yoshimasa Hosoya (2015-2019), Takuya Eguchi (2019-present)
Kotaro's friend since middle school. He is nicknamed "Shibaken." He has a reputation for being a playboy, but he was actually a shy and sensitive person in elementary school. After Arisa scolds him for his behavior, he begins to rethink himself, realizing that his casual relationships are not serious. He breaks up with his girlfriends, intending to have Arisa as his only focus. His main song is "Ijiwaru na Deai" (イジワルな出会い) and "Namaiki Honey" (生意気ハーニー).
Kodai Yamamoto (山本 幸大, Yamamoto Kōdai)
Voiced by: Yoshitsugu Matsuoka
Kotaro and Ken's best friend, who loves to read books and seems to be very observant of other people. He secretly has a crush on Natsuki, but never tells her. He works at a cafe and eventually met his girlfriend, Juri Hattori, there. His main songs are "Lens Goshi no Keshiki" (レンズ越しの景色) and "Suki Datta Niteru Kouhai" (好きだった似てる後輩).

=== New First Year Students ===
Hiyori Suzumi (涼海 ひより, Suzumi Hiyori)
Voiced by: Inori Minase
A classmate of the idol group LIPxLIP, and eventually their junior manager and friend. Originally from the countryside, she came to Tokyo for high school and joined the Track and Field Club as Hina's junior. She has her own desire to be treated like a princess and falls in love with the princely idol Asuka Kaido at a bookstore, but her feelings are not reciprocated. She is also confessed to by her longtime childhood friend Nagisa Shiranami, but she rejects him on the grounds that she wants to focus on her work at the moment. She is hardworking, but goes at her own pace. Her main songs are the "Heroine" subseries, consisting of "Heroine Ikusei Keikaku" (ヒロイン育成計画), "Heroine Tarumono!" (ヒロインたるもの!) and "Heroine wa Heikinika." (ヒロインは平均以下.)
Yujiro Someya (染谷 勇次郎, Someya Yūjirō)
Voiced by: Kōki Uchiyama
A member of the idol group LIPxLIP. His mother married into a prestigious Kabuki theater line, but he himself was rejected as the heir in favor of his younger stepbrother Koichiro. Shares a friendly rivalry with his idol partner Aizo, although they did not get along at first. His main solo song is "Seika" (青華).
Mona Narumi (成海 萌奈, Narumi Mona)
Voiced by: Shiina Natsukawa
An up-and-coming, hard-working solo idol, using the stage name "mona". She is a rival of the idol group LIPxLIP. She gets supported by her older sister, Sena Narumi, to whom she looks up to. Her main songs are "Watashi, Idol Sengen" (私、アイドル宣言), "Fansa" (ファンサ), and "No.1".
Aizo Shibasaki (柴崎 愛蔵, Shibasaki Aizō)
Voiced by: Nobunaga Shimazaki
Ken Shibasaki's younger brother is a member of the idol group LIPxLIP. He does not like his older brother or mother, the latter because she neglects both brothers and abuses him, and the former for his womanizing. Shares a friendly rivalry with his idol partner, Yujiro, but comes to see him as an important friend. His main solo song is "YELLOW".
Juri Hattori (服部樹里, Hattori Jyuri)
Voiced by: Ayane Sakura
A bubbly gyaru Hiyori befriends during her time at Sakuragaoka High School. She meets and dates a waiter at a cafe she frequents, who turns out to be Kodai Yamamoto. Her given songs are "Kawaii ne Iwarechatta" and "Uchira, Koibito Sengen!".
Chizuru Nakamura (中村千鶴, Nakamura Chidzuru)
Voiced by: Saori Hayami
A quiet and bookish girl who befriends Hiyori and Juri. In actuality, she is a big fan of LIPxLIP, in particular Aizo, and works under the pseudonym "Chu-tan" in order to gain more money to spend on her obsession. She once exposes Hiyori's closeness to LIPxLIP to the public out of jealousy, but she is later forgiven by Hiyori, and the two make amends. Her given songs (as Chu-tan) are "Doutan Kyohi", "Oshi Goto", and "Kawaikute Gomen".

=== Other characters ===
Saku Akechi (明智 咲, Akechi Saku)
Voiced by: Hikaru Midorikawa
A teacher at Sakuragaoka Academy and the advisor of the Movie Research Club. He was Chiaki's best friend and had known Haruki since childhood. Since Chiaki's death, his relationship with Haruki has been strained. His main subject is literature, and he always wears a white coat so his clothes do not get dirty. Akechi later couples with a Sakuragaoka alumnus five years after she graduates. His main song is "Inokori Sensei" (イノコリ先生).
Chiaki Serizawa (芹沢 千秋, Serizawa Chiaki)
Voiced by: Ryohei Kimura
Haruki's late older brother and Saku's best friend. He died due to his illness. He saved Miou from drowning when she was younger. He appeared in "Inokori-sensei" (イノコリ先生). His main song is "Senkou Hanabi" (線香花火).
Ryō Ōgino (扇野 りょう, Ōgino Ryō)
Voiced by: Marina Inoue
A sports-type girl. Younger sister of the Sakuragaoka faculty member Hiro Ogino, and a Sakuragaoka alumnus in her second year of college. She is a varsity volleyball player, the best in her team, and is admired by her female juniors. While there's not a lot of information on her, she seems to have a connection with Koyuki Ayase and couples with him when he enters her college. Her given song is "Ren'ai Jōju" (恋愛成就).
Minami (南)
Voiced by: Toshiyuki Toyonaga
A cat-like boy who also performs as a YouTuber and occasionally as an idol. Has a crush on Nakuru, a girl he collaborated with for a music video, but when he confesses, he is rejected by her and asked to remain friends. He eventually confronts Nakuru's abusive boyfriend and properly dates her. Is friends with the LIP×LIP duo. His given songs are "1% no Koibito" (1%の恋人) and "Kareshi no Shikaku" (彼氏の資格).
Nagisa Shiranami
Voiced by: Junya Enoki
A childhood friend of Hiyori, and the son of a restaurant owner. While he is also a runner, he desires to take over his father's business one day and studies in Tokyo to get more culinary experience. He has been in love with Hiyori for years, but only properly tells her during high school. While he gets rejected and also agrees to focus on pursuing his dream job, it is hinted that he will pair with Hiyori in the future. His given song is "Suki na Ko ni Usotsuita." (好きな子に嘘ついた.).

== Discography ==
=== Singles ===
Release date	Title	Artist(s)
December 31, 2015	"Boku ga Namae o Yobu Hi/ Watashi ga Koi o Shiru Hi" (僕が名前を呼ぶ日/私が恋を知る日)	GUMI
April 13, 2016	"Koi Iro ni Sake" (恋色に咲け)	Sana
April 20, 2016	"Ippun'ichibyō Kimi to Boku no" (一分一秒君と僕の)	Sphere
August 14, 2016	"Terekakushi Kinenbi/Kawaiku Naritai" (テレカクシ記念日/可愛くなりたい)	Gom, Sana
December 14, 2016	"Senpai." (センパイ。)	TrySail
August 9, 2017	"Judge☆/Tsuki no Hime" (ジャッジ☆/月の姫, Jajji☆/Tsuki no Hime)	Hatsune Miku, GUMI
December 6, 2017	"Non Fantasy/Hitsuyō Fukkaketsu" (ノンファンタジー / 必要不可欠)	LIPxLIP
December 6, 2017	"Tokyo Winter Session" (東京ウインターセッション)	Haruka Tomatsu, Hiroshi Kamiya, Yūki Kaji, Kana Asumi, Kenichi Suzumura, Aki Toyosaki
January 1, 2018	"Chocokano/White Day Kiss (チョコカノ/ホワイトデーキッス, Chokokano/Howaito Dee Kissu)	Hatsune Miku, GUMI
December 1, 2018	"Chiisana Lion" (小さなライオン, Chiisana Raion)	LIPxLIP feat. Futenyan (CV. Toshiyuki Toyonaga)
December 30, 2018	LOVE	Fukase, flower
August 26, 2020	"Heroine Tarumono!/1% no Koibito" (ヒロインたるもの！/1%の恋人, Hiroin Tarumono!/1% no Koibito)	Inori Minase and Toshiyuki Toyonaga
October 21, 2020	Sis×Love/Suiyobi no Yakusoku -another story- (シス×ラブ/水曜日の約束-another story-)	Sora Amamiya and Shiina Natsukawa
November 25, 2020	Kon'yaku Sensō/Samishigariya (婚約戦争/さみしがりや)	Hiroshi Kamiya, Yūki Kaji, Kenichi Suzumura, Takuya Eguchi, and Nobunaga Shimazaki
December 23, 2020	LOVE&KISS/Kono Sekai no Tanoshimikata (LOVE& KISS/この世界の楽しみ方)	LIPxLIP

=== Albums ===
Release date	Title	Package number		Oricon highest chart
Release date	Title	Limited edition	Standard edition	Oricon highest chart
November 26, 2014	"Boku Ja Dame Desu ka? (僕じゃダメですか？)	SMCL-363〜5	SMCL-366	4
February 22, 2017	"Nando Datte, Suki." (何度だって、好き。)	SMCL-466〜8	SMCL-469	4
January 15, 2020	"Suki Sugite Yabai." (好きすぎてやばい。)	SMCL-635〜637	SMCL-638〜639	5
March 26, 2020	"Kokuhaku Jikkō Iinkai -FLYING SONGS- -Aishiteru- (告白実行委員会 -FLYING SONGS- 愛してる)	TBA	TBA	
March 26, 2020	"Kokuhaku Jikkō Iinkai -FLYING SONGS- -Koishiteru- (告白実行委員会 -FLYING SONGS- 恋してる)	TBA	TBA	
March 15, 2023	"Nee, Suki tte Itai yo. (ねえ、好きって痛いよ。)	TBA	TBA	5

== Anime adaptations ==
=== Films ===
The first film titled Zutto Mae Kara Suki Deshita opened in Japan on April 23, 2016. The film is based on the songs "Kokuhaku Yokō Renshū," "Hatsukoi no Ehon," and "Yakimochi no Kotae," which tell the third year students' love stories. The opening theme performed by CHiCO is titled "Koi Iro Sake" (恋色に咲け) and the ending theme performed by Sphere is titled "Ippun'ichibyō Kimi to Boku no."

The second film Suki ni Naru Sono Shunkan o opened in Japan on December 17, 2016. The film is based on the songs "Ima Suki ni naru" and "Sankaku Jealousy," which tell the love story of Hina Setoguchi, Kotaro Enomoto, and Koyuki Ayase. The opening sung by TrySail is titled "Senpai." and the ending song titled "Daikirai na Hazudatta." is performed by Sayuringo Gundan + Manatsu-san Respect Gundan from Nogizaka46.

Both films are produced by Qualia Animation with direction and scripts respectively by Tetsuya Yanagisawa and Yoshimi Narita. Maki Fujii serves as character designer, adapting Yamako's art and as chief animation director. HoneyWorks serves as a music producer.

In August 2020, HoneyWorks announced a new anime film with the members of LIPxLIP as the main characters. Titled Kono Sekai no Tanoshimikata: Secret Story Film, the film is a part of HoneyWorks' 10th anniversary project. It is produced by CLAP and directed by Fumie Moroi, with scripts written by Yoshimi Narita, character designs by Miwa Oshima, and music composed by Moe Hyūga alongside HoneyWorks. The film was released in Japan on December 25, 2020. The opening song is "Love & Kiss" and the ending song is "Kono Sekai no Tanoshimikata," both performed by LIPxLIP.

=== Television series ===
==== Our love has always been 10 centimeters apart (2017) ====
In March 2017, an anime television special was announced on the official HoneyWorks Twitter account. The series titled Our love has always been 10 centimeters apart (いつだって僕らの恋は10センチだった。, Itsu Datte Bokura no Koi wa 10 Senchi Datta.) was broadcast for six weeks starting on November 24, 2017, on Tokyo MX and BS11. The story focuses on Mio Aida and Haruki Serizawa, with new elements added to the plot; the series adapts the songs "Hatsukoi Ehon" and "Ippun'ichibyō Kimi to Boku." The animation is produced by Lay-duce while Takurō Tsukada serves as the director and Hitoshi Nanba serves as the chief director. The group LIPxLIP, composed of Kōki Uchiyama and Nobunaga Shimazaki, performs the opening theme "Non Fantasy" (ノンファンタジー). The main cast members as their characters (Haruka Tomatsu as Natsuki Enomoto, Hiroshi Kamiya as Yu Setoguchi, Yūki Kaji as Sota Mochizuki, Kana Asumi as Akari Hayasaka, Kenichi Suzumura as Haruki Serizawa, and Aki Toyosaki as Mio Aida) perform the ending theme "Tokyo Winter Session" (東京ウインターセッション). The final episode features a song performed by Aki Toyosaki under her character name Mio Aida titled "Re: Hatsukoi no Ehon" (Re:初恋の絵本). Aniplex of America has licensed the series for a North American release. Crunchyroll holds the rights for online streaming. On August 24, Funimation announced they would add the show to their catalog the next day.

No.	Title	Insert song(s)	Original release date
1	"Spring, First Love, Color of Cherry Blossoms"; Transliteration: "Haru, Hatsukoi, Sakurairo." (Japanese: 春、初恋、桜色。)	N/A	November 24, 2017
2	"Summer, Fireworks, Color of Love"; Transliteration: "Natsu, Hanabi, Koi no Iro." (Japanese: 夏、花火、恋の色。)	"Hitsuyō Fukaketsu" (必要不可欠) by LIPxLIP "Tokyo Summer Session" (東京サマーセッション) by sana & CHiCO	December 2, 2017
3	"Secret, Solitude, Color of Twilight"; Transliteration: "Himitsu, Kodoku, Yūgure-iro." (Japanese: 秘密、孤独、夕暮れ色。)	"Kikoemasuka" (聞こえますか) by Koinu	December 9, 2017
4	"Study Abroad, Map of the Future, Color of the Heart"; Transliteration: "Ryūgaku, Mirai-zu, Kokoro no Iro." (Japanese: 留学、未来図、心の色。)	N/A	December 16, 2017
5	"First Snow, Dreams, Color of Tears"; Transliteration: "Hatsuyuki, Yume, Namida no Iro." (Japanese: 初雪、夢、涙の色。)	N/A	December 23, 2017
6	"Graduation, Adventures, Color of the Future"; Transliteration: "Sotsugyō, Tabidachi, Mirai no Iro." (Japanese: 卒業、旅立ち、未来の色。)	"Koi to Iu Okurimono" (恋という贈り物) by Amatsuki	December 30, 2017

==== Heroines Run the Show (2022) ====
In August 2021, a second anime television series titled Heroines Run the Show: The Unpopular Girl and the Secret Task was announced. The story focuses on Hiyori Suzumi and her journey to becoming the junior manager of LIPxLIP. The series is produced by Lay-duce and directed by Noriko Hashimoto, with scripts written by Yoshimi Narita, character designs by Kaori Ishii, and music composed by Moe Hyūga. It aired from April 7 to June 23, 2022.

== Other media ==
=== Light novels ===
A light novel series adaptation is published by Kadokawa Shoten's Kadokawa Beans Bunko. The volumes are written by Tōko Fujitani up to volume 6, and then Mari Kōsaka from volume 7 onwards. Illustrations were solely done by Yamako up to volume 9, but later only provided the color illustrations; the duty was taken up by Ruia Shimakage from volume 10 onwards.

No.	Title	Japanese release date	Japanese ISBN
1	Kokuhaku Yokō Renshū (告白予行練習)	February 1, 2014	978-4-04-101203-1
"Practice1" (練習1, "Renshū 1"); "Practice2" (練習2, "Renshū 2"); "Practice3" (練習3, "Renshū 3"); "Practice4" (練習4, "Renshū 4"); "Practice5" (練習5, "Renshū 5"); "Practice6" (練習6, "Renshū 6"); "Practice7" (練習7, "Renshū 7"); "Practice8" (練習8, "Renshū 8"); "Epilogue" (エピローグ, "Epirōgu")
2	Yakimochi no Kotae (ヤキモチの答え)	June 1, 2014	978-4-04-101577-3
"Answer1" (答え1, "Kotae1"); "Answer2" (答え2, "Kotae2"); "Answer3" (答え3, "Kotae3"); "Answer4" (答え4, "Kotae4"); "Answer5" (答え5, "Kotae5"); "Answer6" (答え6, "Kotae6"); "Answer7" (答え7, "Kotae7"); "Epilogue" (エピローグ, "Epirōgu")
3	Hatsukoi no Ehon (初恋の絵本)	November 1, 2014	978-4-04-101578-0
"Chapter1" (章1, "Fumi1"); "Chapter2" (章2, "Fumi2"); "Chapter3" (章3, "Fumi3"); "Chapter4" (章4, "Fumi4"); "Chapter5" (章5, "Fumi5"); "Chapter6" (章6, "Fumi6"); "Chapter7" (章7, "Fumi7"); "Epilogue" (エピローグ, "Epirōgu")
4	Ima Suki ni Naru. (今好きになる。)	July 1, 2015	978-4-04-102511-6
5	Koi Iro Sake (恋色に咲け)	April 1, 2016	978-40-4103839-0
6	Kin'yōbi no Ohayō (金曜日のおはよう)	October 1, 2016	978-40-4102513-0
7	Heart no Shuchō (ハートの主張)	October 1, 2017	978-40-4106113-8
8	Ijiwaru na Deai (イジワルな出会い)	November 1, 2017	978-40-4106118-3
9	Boku ga Namae wo Yobu Hi (僕が名前を呼ぶ日)	October 10, 2018	978-40-4106118-3
10	Daikirai na Hazu datta. (大嫌いなはずだった。)	June 1, 2019	978-40-4108338-3
11	Non Fantasy (ノンファンタジー)	December 1, 2019	978-40-4108964-4
12	Heroine Ikusei Keikaku (ヒロイン育成計画)	January 10, 2020	978-40-4108965-1
13	Tokyo Summer Session (東京サマーセッション)	September 1, 2020	978-40-4109994-0
14	Romeo (ロメオ)	January 10, 2020	978-40-4110799-7
15	Otome-domo yo (乙女どもよ。)	December 1, 2021	978-40-4112079-8
16	Fantasia LOVE&KISS (ファンタジア LOVE&KISS)	November 1, 2022	978-40-4113127-5

=== Video game ===
A smartphone app game titled HoneyWorks Premium Live based on HoneyWorks' songs was announced alongside plans for the television anime. The game eventually was released as part of HoneyWorks' HoneyWorks Atelier project to celebrate their tenth active year, and was delayed to 2020. It was released on November 18, 2020, the 9th anniversary of their PV for "Hatsukoi no Ehon", and was initially developed by Akatsuki Inc. before development duties moved over to flaggs The game ended service at 3:00 PM on March 31, 2023.

The game is a rhythm game that prominently features the primary cast of Kokuhaku Jikkō Iinkai, both in-story and sharing the majority of songs available for the game.
