= Takane no Nadeshiko =

Japanese idol group

Background information
- Genre: J-Pop
- Labels: TAKANEKOchan MUSIC (2022–present); JVCKenwood Victor Entertainment (2024–present)
- Members: Nao Kizuki; Suu Suzumi; Momoko Hashimoto; Saran Hazuki; Erisa Higashiyama; Hina Hinahata; Momona Matsumoto; Himeri Momiyama
- Past members: Riri Haruno; Mirai Hoshiya
- Website: 高嶺のなでしこ公式サイト

Takane no Nadeshiko (Japanese: 高嶺のなでしこ) is a Japanese idol group. They debuted in 2022 with sound production by HoneyWorks. They are managed by TWIN PLANET and INCS toenter, and signed to the Victor Entertainment label.

== Overview ==
The group aims to perform at the Nippon Budokan.

The creative unit HoneyWorks serves as the sound producer. Anna Murashige (formerly of HKT48) and Yuji Maeda (President and CEO of SHOWROOM) served as audition ambassadors.

The group made their stage debut at "TIF2022" on 7 August 2022.

The group was formed in 2022 with a total of ten members: seven selected through the JDOL audition and three former members of Last Idol. The name embodies the wish for them to become a proud idol group—one that is admired by many as something unattainable, like a "lofty peak" (takane), yet possesses the refined beauty and cuteness of a traditional Japanese woman (Yamato Nadeshiko, meaning the personification of an ideal Japanese woman).

The group has been an ambassador for "Unten Menkyo Torokka!" since April 2023.

Has served as a "Dairy Farming Support Ambassador" for the Central Dairy Council's dairy support project since October 2023.

== History ==
2022
10 July: The final round of the JDOL Audition, featuring 36 finalists, was held, and the seven successful candidates who would form the new idol unit were selected.
5 August: The group name was announced. Three former members of Last Idol—Momona Matsumoto, Momoko Hashimoto, and Himeri Momiyama—joined the group.
7 August: The group made its debut at "TOKYO IDOL FESTIVAL 2022 supported by Nishitan Clinic." They performed three songs: "Anti-Fan," "Yumemusubi," and "Seishun Train" (a Last Idol cover).
7 August: The official website, online shop, and SHOWROOM account were launched.
10 August: A special debut program titled "Get to Know Us! Takane no Nadeshiko ☆ Debut Special!" was streamed on SHOWROOM. During a mini fan meeting segment, the group's abbreviation was decided as "Takaneko".
26 October: The first single, "Anti-Fan," was released.
31 October: "Takane no Nadeshiko 1st Fan Meeting" was held at Toyosu PIT.
18 November: A music video covering the HoneyWorks song "Kawaikute Gomen feat. Chu-tan (CV: Saori Hayami)" was released.
26 December: The song "Onna no Ko wa Tsuyoi" was released digitally.

2023
27 January: the digital single "Kawaikute Gomen (Takaneko ver.)" was released.
14 February: the group held its first self-organized joint concert event, "Takaneko Fes: Valentine Party 2023," at KT Zepp Yokohama.
4 April: the digital singles "Kakumei no Joou" and "Boku wa Kimi ni Narenai" were released.
13 April: the group was appointed as the new ambassador for "Unten Menkyo Torokka!".
23 April – 23 June: the "Takane no Nadeshiko Nationwide Invitation Tour 2023: First Trip" was held across six venues.
5 May: a dedicated segment titled "Takane no Nadeshiko no Yoru Osoku ni Gomen!" (Sorry for the Late Night, from Takane no Nadeshiko!) began airing on the FM NACK5 program Hit Hit Hit!!!.
4 July, the digital single "Hatsukoi no Hito." was released.
3 September: the "Takane no Nadeshiko 1st Anniversary Live: Utsukushiku Ikiro" was held at Toyosu PIT, where the group announced its major label debut for the coming winter.
16 October: the group was appointed as ambassadors for a dairy farming support project and released the digital single "Itsuka Watashi ga Mama ni Nattara".
1 November: it was announced that their major debut single, "Utsukushiku Ikiro," would be released via Victor Entertainment.

2024
1 February: Performed at "ONTEMPO Vol. 1 MACAO JAPAN SPRING FESTIVAL" held in Macau.
21 February: Released major debut single "Utsukushiku Ikiro / Koi o Shitta Sekai". Held a release event at the outdoor stage of Tokyu Kabukicho Tower in Tokyo.
6 April: Broadcast began for their own radio program, "Takane no Nadeshiko no Idol Jugyō-chū!" (produced by Music Bird).
12 May – 13 July: Held the "Takane no Nadeshiko National Tour 2024: Watashi-iro ni Somare" across six venues.
29 May: Collaborated with impressionist Hoi Kenta on the song "Kawaikute Gomen" during the "FNS Oni-Renchan Kayō-sai" special, a spin-off of the show Chidori no Oni-Renchan.
5 June: Released the digital single "Watashi Yori Suki de Ite".
14 July: Released the digital single "Mote-chen!". TikTok creators Local Campione choreographed part of the chorus, while Himeri Momiyama took on the challenge of choreographing the entire song for the first time.
15 July: Appointed as ambassadors for the double-eyelid cosmetic brand "Eye Talk".
7 August: Held the "2nd Fan Meeting: Seichō Happyō-kai" (Growth Showcase) at Toyosu PIT.
15 September – 8 November: Held the Takane no Nadeshiko 2nd Anniversary Zepp Tour 2024, titled "Matataki Sae Wasureru" (Forgetting Even to Blink), across six venues.
5 October: Broadcast began for their own radio program, "Takane no Nadeshiko no Radio-cchū no!", on FM Osaka. On December 11, the group released its second major single, "I'M YOUR IDOL / Adrenaline Game". The song was selected as the ending theme for the anime Run for the Money: The Great Mission.

2025
14 February: Held the "Takane no Nadeshiko Solo Concert 2025 ~Cute for life~ supported by KOJI" at Yoyogi National Gymnasium Second Gymnasium.
7 April: Released "Cute for life" digitally.
30 April: Released "Melancholic Honey", the first in a series of five consecutive digital releases themed "Why not fall in love this summer?", which was selected as a tie-in song for JOYSOUND.
6 May – 14 May: Held the "Takane no Nadeshiko Tokyo-Nagoya-Osaka Tour 2025 – Spring Ride –" across three venues.
26 May: Announced that Riri Haruno would be suspending her activities indefinitely.
28 May: Released "Idol Ishou" (Idol Costume), the second in the five-song digital release series, digitally.
18 June: Released "Hatsukoi no Kotae." (The Answer to First Love), the third in the five-song digital release series, digitally.
20 & 22 June: Held their first solo concerts in Guangzhou and Shanghai.
2 July: Digitally released "Life Quest", the fourth in the five-song digital release series; it was selected as the ending theme for the drama "Banshaku no Ryuugi 4 ~Summer Edition~".
31 July: Announced that Riri Haruno would be leaving the group.
7 August: Held the Takane no Nadeshiko "3rd Fan Meeting ~Our Declaration Ceremony~" at Toyosu PIT.
20 August: Digitally released "Kono Sekai wa Uso de Dekiteiru" (This World Is Made of Lies), the fifth in the five-song digital release series.
7 September: Takane no Nadeshiko held their 3rd Anniversary Concert, "A Wonderful Encounter," at Makuhari Event Hall.
7 October: Their self-titled radio program, Takane no Nadeshiko Radio Regular Performance: "Takaneko Night", began broadcasting on TOKYO FM.
On December 5, the song "Hana wa Chikai o Wasurenai" was released digitally.
On December 17, the group released their first album, Miageru Tabi ni, Koi o Suru. On the same day, a release event for the album was held at the Festival Plaza in DiverCity Tokyo Plaza.
On December 22, it was announced that Himeri Momiyama would be going on hiatus.

2026
30 January: It was announced that Himeri Momiyama would resume activities starting 14 February.
14 February – 6 May: The "Takane no Nadeshiko Live Tour – Bouquet of 9 Flowers" was held in Japan and overseas.
29 March – 10 May: A "Takane no Nadeshiko × CheerSPOT" collaboration project was conducted.
13 May: The song "Ikiteru ya Ii" was released digitally. It served as the original tie-in song for the Acecook "Acecook Harusame × Takane no Nadeshiko Campaign".
17 June: It was announced that Mirai Hoshiya would graduate from the group at the end of August.
12 August: The song "Bokura no Ao" was released digitally.
25 August: Mirai Hoshiya's graduation concert was held at Ebisu The Garden Hall.
31 August: Mirai Hoshiya graduated from the group.

== Members ==
Name	Date of birth	Place of birth	Colour	Notes
Nao Kizuki (城月菜央)	25 December 2003 (age 22)	Saitama	Yellow	Formerly of #PEXACOA
Suzumi Su (涼海すう)	22 August 2007 (age 19)	Osaka	Light blue	
Momoko Hashimoto (橋本桃呼)	28 June 2003 (age 23)	Yamaguchi	Deep pink	Former Hello! Project trainee, former 2nd-generation member of Last Idol
Saara Hazuki (葉月紗蘭)	3 March 2007 (age 19)	Mie	White	Profile and Anecdotes She decided to pursue a career as an idol after watching the Nizi Project in 2020. She cites Miihi (Miko Suzuno) of NiziU as her inspiration. She possesses a distinctive singing voice. Although she did not pass a different audition she took prior to the JDOL audition, an interviewer praised her, saying, "You have a great singing voice—you should really develop that." This encouragement eventually led her to audition for Takane no Nadeshiko.. On January 26, 2026, she appeared as the character "Nagi" in the short film Singing Ghibli Part 2: The Story of Fu and Nagi. In June 2026, she was appointed as an official ambassador for ITTY-WINTIT. Her nicknames are "Saa-san" and "Saa-chan". She is 160 cm tall. Her hobby is watching movies, and her special skill is drawing. Her fan name is "Ha-gumi," and her hashtag is #さあらいふ.
Erisa Higashiyama (東山恵里沙)	28 May 2006 (age 20)	Gifu	Orange	Former student at ZEST MUSIC SCHOOL. Profile and anecdotes Having long loved idols, she decided to pursue a career as an idol after becoming inspired by Iori Noguchi of =LOVE. She looks up to Iori Noguchi as a "textbook" for idols, learning from aspects such as the way Noguchi infuses deep emotion into her singing. Her grandmother shows her support by doing things like distributing CDs to people in the neighborhood. On September 5, 2024, the group Takane no Nadeshiko performed at Nagaragawa Stadium in Gifu Prefecture—the home prefecture of one of its members—prior to a professional baseball game between the Yomiuri Giants and the Tokyo Yakult Swallows. A member of the group provided a comment on behalf of the ensemble. }}</ref> She served as a regular personality for the TOKYO FM program "Takane no Nadeshiko Radio Regular Performance: 'Takaneko Night'."; Her nicknames are "Erisa" and "Ri-chan." Her most distinctive feature is her cheeks. She is 157 cm tall. Her favorite foods are meat, cheese, and eggs. Her fan name is "Hanjuku Tamago" (Soft-boiled Egg). Her designated hashtag is #Erisearch.
Hina Hinahata (日向端ひな)	30 October 2002 (age 24)	Kanagawa	Purple	
Momona Matsumoto (松本ももな)	12 October 2002 (age 24)	Kanagawa	Light pink	Formerly of Amorecarina, former 1st-generation member of Last Idol, member of Choux Cream Rockets
Himeri Momiyama (籾山ひめり)	22 March 2004 (age 22)	Tochigi	Blue	Captain Former 1st-generation member of Last Idol, Someday Somewhere

=== Former members ===
Name	Date of birth	Place of birth	Member colour	Notes
Riri Haruno (春野莉々)	16 January 2004 (age 22)	Nagano	Green	Halted activities starting in May 2025. Announced withdrawal on 31 July 2025.
Mikuru Hoshitani (星谷美来)	6 November 2003 (age 23)	Tokyo	Red	Graduated on 31 August 2026. Formerly of Onigokko and Negaigoto. Personal details She aspired to become an idol after being moved by the thunderous applause and cheers she received on stage during a dance recital in elementary school, realizing then how wonderful it is to perform. Within the group, she is known for her "cunningly cute" azato-kawaii persona and frequently handles lines or vocal parts with a cute style. Her nickname is "Mikurun." She is 161 cm tall. Her charming feature is the dimple that appears when she smiles. Her hobbies include cafe-hopping and driving. Her special skills are riding a unicycle (including pedaling while going downhill) and rapid-fire posing. She is the group's "sweets specialist," and her favorite foods are strawberries, crème brûlée, and omelets. Her fan base is called "Mikerun-tai" (Mikerun Squad). Her fan emojis are 🫠🏹. Her hashtag is #MainichiMikurun.

== Mascots and affiliated groups ==
An original YouTube programme, TakanekoTube, that launched on March 6, 2025, with new episodes released every Thursday. Its catchphrase is "Laughter and tears!? We're up for any challenge!". The hashtag on Twitter is "#TakanekoTube."

An official cat-themed character created by Mogeratta, an illustrator for HoneyWorks. It was unveiled in May 2024.

There are characters representing the group as a whole, as well as individual characters that reflect each member's signature color and characteristics.

The members named the characters themselves, and footage of the process has been released on YouTube.

The group's official mascot, "Tennya" means "cat heading toward the heavens" and was named by member Hinahata. The initial idea was to write it using the kanji characters for "heaven" and "cat" (Ten-Neko).

In addition to merchandise such as plush toys for each character, a mascot costume of "Tennya" appears at their solo live shows.

The group also has an official "big sister" group, TEAM SHACHI, and an official mother, Iyo Matsumoto.
