= Futari Shizuka =

"Futari Shizuka: Tenkawa Densetsu Satsujin Jiken yori"

Single by Akina Nakamori

from the album Best III
- Language: Japanese
- English title: Two People Still: From The Legendary Tenkawa Murder Case
- B-side: "Wasurete..."
- Released: March 25, 1991
- Recorded: 1990
- Genre: J-pop; kayōkyoku
- Length: 4:08
- Label: Reprise Records
- Composer: Makoto Sekiguchi
- Lyricist: Takashi Matsumoto

Akina Nakamori singles chronology
"Mizu ni Sashita Hana" (1990)	"Futari Shizuka: Tenkawa Densetsu Satsujin Jiken yori" (1991)	"Everlasting Love" (1993)

Music videos
- "Futari Shizuka: Tenkawa Densetsu Satsujin Jiken yori" (Live) on YouTube

"Futari Shizuka: Tenkawa Densetsu Satsujin Jiken yori" (二人静 -「天河伝説殺人事件」より; lit. "Two People Still: From The Legendary Tenkawa Murder Case") is the 26th single by Japanese entertainer Akina Nakamori. Written by Takashi Matsumoto and Makoto Sekiguchi, the single was released on March 25, 1991, by Warner Pioneer through the Reprise label. It was also the third single from her fifth compilation album Best III. This was Nakamori's final release under Warner Pioneer.

== Background ==
The song was released in two versions for the 1991 film Tenkawa Densetsu Satsujin Jiken (天河伝説殺人事件; lit. The Legendary Tenkawa Murder Case). The first one by Makoto Sekiguchi was titled "Tenkawa Densetsu Satsujin Jiken" and used as the film's main theme and released in his studio album Itazura (悪戯; lit. Mischief). The second version by Nakamori was retitled "Futari Shizuka" and used as an image song for the film's trailers and commercials.

The B-side is "Wasurete..." (忘れて…; lit. "Forget..."), which was co-written by Nakamori.

Shortly after the release of this single, Nakamori left Warner Pioneer following issues she had with the label. Due to various reasons, she was not allowed to record for other labels until 1993, when she signed with MCA Victor.

Nakamori has re-recorded "Futari Shizuka" for the 1995 compilation True Album Akina 95 Best.

== Chart performance ==
"Futari Shizuka" peaked at No. 3 on Oricon's weekly singles chart and sold over 483,700 copies. It was also certified Gold by the RIAJ.

== Track listing ==
Original release
No.	Title	Lyrics	Music	Arrangement	Length
1.	"Futari Shizuka: Tenkawa Densetsu Satsujin Jiken yori" ((二人静 -「天河伝説殺人事件」より; "Two People Still: From The Legendary Tenkawa Murder Case"))	Takashi Matsumoto	Makoto Sekiguchi	Akira Inoue	4:08
2.	"Wasurete..." ((忘れて…; "Forget..."))	Akina Nakamori	Kenji Hazama	Atsushi Onozawa	2:48
Total length:					6:56

1998 reissue bonus track
No.	Title	Lyrics	Music	Length
3.	"Futari Shizuka (Live Version)" ((二人静(LIVE VERSION)))	Matsumoto	Sekiguchi

== Charts ==
Chart (1991)	Peak position
Japan (Oricon)	3

== Certification ==
Region	Certification	Certified units/sales
Japan (RIAJ)	Gold	200,000^{^}
^{^} Shipments figures based on certification alone.

== Release history ==
Year	Format(s)	Serial number	Label(s)	Ref.
1991	8cm CD, CT	WPDL-4229, WPSL-4190	Warner Pioneer	
1998	12cm CD	WPC6-8683	Warner Pioneer	
2008	Digital download	-	Warner Pioneer	
2014	Digital download - remaster	-	Warner Pioneer	
