= Heroines Run the Show =

Japanese anime television series

- Heroines Run the Show: The Unpopular Girl and the Secret Task
- Key visual

ヒロインたるもの！～嫌われヒロインと内緒のお仕事～ (Hiroin Tarumono! Kiraware Hiroin to Naisho no Oshigoto)
- Genre: Comedy
- Created by: HoneyWorks
- Anime television series
- Directed by: Noriko Hashimoto
- Written by: Yoshimi Narita
- Music by: Moe Hyūga
- Studio: Lay-duce
- Licensed by: Crunchyroll
- Original network: Tokyo MX, BS Fuji, MBS, AT-X
- Original run: April 7, 2022 – June 23, 2022
- Episodes: 12
- Manga
- Illustrated by: Ruia Shimakage
- Published by: Futabasha
- Original run: June 16, 2022 – present
- Volumes: 3
- icon

Heroines Run the Show: The Unpopular Girl and the Secret Task (Japanese: ヒロインたるもの！～嫌われヒロインと内緒のお仕事～, Hepburn: Hiroin Tarumono! Kiraware Hiroin to Naisho no Oshigoto) is a Japanese anime television series produced by Lay-duce. It is based on the song "Heroine Tarumono!", part of the Kokuhaku Jikkō Iinkai: Ren'ai Series Vocaloid song project by HoneyWorks. The series aired from April to June 2022.

A manga adaptation was illustrated by Ruia Shimakage published by Futabasha on June 16, 2022.

== Synopsis ==
After leaving her rural hometown to pursue a career in track-and-field by enrolling in Tokyo's Sakuragaoka High School, Hiyori Suzumi becomes manager-in-training for the high school idol duo LIP×LIP, who happen to be her classmates. Hijinks ensue as she tries to balance track, schoolwork, making new friends, and working in secret to manage Lip×Lip.

== Characters ==
Hiyori Suzumi (涼海 ひより, Suzumi Hiyori)
Voiced by: Inori Minase (Japanese); Sarah Wiedenheft (English)
Hiyori is a first-year student and a newcomer to Tokyo. She transferred there from the countryside in order to pursue track and field. She becomes an apprentice manager to Lip×Lip after she met them during her first day at school.
Yūjirō Someya (染谷 勇次郎, Someya Yūjirō)
Voiced by: Koki Uchiyama (Japanese); Kyle Igneczi (English)
Yūjirō is a first-year student and Hiyori's classmate. He and Aizō are both members of Lip×Lip.
Aizō Shibasaki (柴崎 愛蔵, Shibasaki Aizō)
Voiced by: Nobunaga Shimazaki (Japanese); Aaron Campbell (English)
Aizō is a first-year student and Hiyori's classmate. He and Yūjirō are both members of LIP×LIP.
Juri Hattori (服部 樹里, Hattori Juri)
Voiced by: Ayane Sakura (Japanese); Morgan Lauré (English)
Juri is a first-year student and Hiyori's classmate and friend. She is a gyaru.
Chizuru Nakamura (中村 千鶴, Nakamura Chizuru)
Voiced by: Saori Hayami (Japanese); Megan Shipman (English)
Chizuru is a first-year student in Hiyori's class. She is a big fan of Lip×Lip. At one point, Chizuru became jealous of Hiyori after discovering she had become close to them.
Nagisa Shiranami (白波 渚, Shiranami Nagisa)
Voiced by: Junya Enoki
Nagisa is a former colleague and current love interest of Hiyori Suzumi who is a track-and-field runner.
Hina Setoguchi (瀬戸口 雛, Setoguchi Hina)
Voiced by: Momo Asakura (Japanese); Jill Harris (English)
Hina is a second-year student who is close friends with Kotaro and becomes friend with Hiyori. She debuted in Zutto Mae Kara Suki Deshita.
Kotarō Enomoto (榎本 虎太朗, Enomoto Kotarō)
Voiced by: Natsuki Hanae (Japanese); Dallas Reid (English)
Kotarō is a second-year student who is close friends with Hina. He debuted in Zutto Mae Kara Suki Deshita.
Ken Shibasaki (柴崎 健, Shibasaki Ken)
Voiced by: Takuya Eguchi (Japanese); Ricco Fajardo (English)
Arisa Takamizawa (高見沢 アリサ, Takamizawa Arisa)
Voiced by: Nao Tōyama
Kōdai Yamamoto (山本 幸大, Yamamoto Kōdai)
Voiced by: Yoshitsugu Matsuoka (Japanese); Anthony Bowling (English)
Sena Narumi (成海 聖奈, Narumi Sena)
Voiced by: Sora Amamiya
Mona Narumi (成海 萌奈, Narumi Mona)
Voiced by: Shiina Natsukawa

=== Full Throttle4 ===
YUI
Voiced by: Soma Saito
RIO
Voiced by: Yuma Uchida
MEGU
Voiced by: Tetsuya Kakihara
DAI
Voiced by: Toshiki Masuda
IV
Voiced by: Jun Fukuyama

== Media ==
Trailer for the anime

=== Anime ===
The anime project was announced on August 28, 2021. It is produced by Lay-duce and directed by Noriko Hashimoto, with Yoshimi Narita overseeing the series' scripts, Kaori Ishii designing the characters and serving as chief animation director, and Moe Hyūga composing the music. The series aired from April 7 to June 23, 2022, on Tokyo MX, BS Fuji, MBS, and AT-X. The opening theme song is "Julietta" by the in-story group LIP×LIP, while the ending theme song is "Tokyo Sunny Party" by Inori Minase, Ayane Sakura, and Saori Hayami. Crunchyroll streamed the series.

On April 11, 2022, Crunchyroll announced that the series would receive an English dub. It premiered on April 21 and is produced by the in-house cast in Texas.

==== Episodes ====
No.	Title	Directed by (Note: Information is taken from the ending credits of each episode.)	Written by	Storyboarded by	Original release date
1	"I Don't Understand Idols!"; Transliteration: "Aidoru nante Yō Wakaran!" (Japanese: アイドルなんてようわからん！)	Noriko Hashimoto	Yoshimi Narita	Noriko Hashimoto	April 7, 2022
2	"The Manager-in-Training Job!"; Transliteration: "Manējā Minarai no Oshigoto!" (Japanese: マネージャー見習いのお仕事！)	Takurō Tsukada	Yoshimi Narita	Namimi Sanjō	April 14, 2022
3	"Nonfantasy"; Transliteration: "Non-fantajī" (Japanese: ノンファンタジー)	Naoki Murata	Yoshimi Narita	Tomoe Makino	April 21, 2022
4	"What I Can Do"; Transliteration: "Uchi ni Dekiru Koto" (Japanese: うちにできること)	Kōji Kobayashi	Yoshimi Narita	Namimi Sanjō	April 28, 2022
5	"Idols Are Amazin'!"; Transliteration: "Aidoru tte Sugoi!" (Japanese: アイドルってすごい！)	Takurō Tsukada	Deko Akao	Hitomi Ezoe	May 5, 2022
6	"Producing Hiyori."; Transliteration: "Hiyori o Purodyūsu." (Japanese: ひよりをプロデュース。)	Akira Toba	Yoshimi Narita	Namimi Sanjō	May 12, 2022
7	"My Childhood Friend"; Transliteration: "Uchi no Osananajimi" (Japanese: うちの幼なじみ)	Hisashi Isogawa	Yoshimi Narita	Namimi Sanjō	May 19, 2022
8	"Idols Run the Show!"; Transliteration: "Aidoru Tarumono!" (Japanese: アイドルたるもの！)	Akiko Seki	Deko Akao	Satomi Nakamura; Namimi Sanjō	May 26, 2022
9	"Scandal"; Transliteration: "Sukyandaru" (Japanese: スキャンダル)	Keisuke Ōnishi	Deko Akao	Namimi Sanjō	June 2, 2022
10	"I'm Quittin' My Manager Job!"; Transliteration: "Uchi, Manējā Minarai Yamemasu!" (Japanese: うち、マネージャー見習いやめます！)	Naoki Murata	Yoshimi Narita	Tomoe Makino	June 9, 2022
11	"Battle of the Hated Heroine"; Transliteration: "Kiraware Hiroin no Tatakai" (Japanese: 嫌われヒロインの戦い)	Makoto Sokuza	Deko Akao	Namimi Sanjō	June 16, 2022
12	"Passion Is Unbeatable!"; Transliteration: "Daisuki tte Yappa Saikyō!" (Japanese: 大好きってやっぱ最強！)	Noriko Hashimoto	Yoshimi Narita	Namimi Sanjō	June 23, 2022

=== Home media ===
Volume	Release date	Included episodes	Standard product number	
Volume	Release date	Included episodes	BD	DVD
1	July 29, 2022	Episodes 1–3	HPXR-1801	HPBR-1801
2	August 26, 2022	Episodes 4–6	HPXR-1802	HPBR-1802
3	September 28, 2022	Episodes 7–9	HPXR-1803	HPBR-1803
4	October 28, 2022	Episodes 10–12	HPXR-1804	HPBR-1804

=== Manga ===
A manga adaptation was illustrated by Ruia Shimakage. The first volume was published by Futabasha on June 16, 2022. As of May 2023, the manga has published three volumes.

==== Volumes ====
No.	Release date	ISBN
1	June 16, 2022	978-4-575-44019-5
2	October 17, 2022	978-4-575-44029-4
3	May 17, 2023	978-4-575-44036-2

== See also ==
- Kawaikute Gomen, a spin-off manga by the same illustrator
