= Best III (Akina Nakamori album) =

Compilation album by Akina Nakamori
- Released: 10 November 1992
- Recorded: 1989−1991
- Genre: J-pop
- Length: 52:41
- Language: Japanese
- Label: Warner Music Japan

Akina Nakamori chronology
Cruise (1989)	Best III (1992)	Unbalance+Balance (1993)

Singles from Best III
- 1. "Akaitori Nigeta" Released: 19 June 1985; 2. "Dear Friend" Released: 17 July 1990; 3. "Mizu ni Sashita Hana" Released: 6 November 1990; 4. "Futari Shizuka: Tenkawa Densetsu Satsujin Jiken yori" Released: 25 March 1991

Best III is the fifth compilation album by Japanese singer Akina Nakamori. It was released on 10 November 1992 through Warner Music Japan label.

== Background ==
The album followed the earlier Best and Best II onto the album charts. It was released after Nakamori's departure from the Warner Music Japan. The album jacket is taken from the photo book Cruise released in 1989.

The compilation album contains all the singles released between 1989 and 1991: from the single "Liar" to "Futari Shizuka: Tenkawa Densetsu Satsujin Jiken yori" and all their B-sides. Aside of the singles, the album includes "Akaitori Nigeta" (an alternative take of "Meu amor é..."), "La Bohème" (the b-side of "Desire (Jōnetsu)"), "Eki" and "Oh No, Oh Yes!" (from the album Crimson).

== Promotion ==
=== Singles ===
Akaitori Nigeta is the special single to be released on the Nakamori's third debut anniversary. It has different name and lyrics song from "Meu amor é...". Nakamori herself refused to perform the single in the music shows, but she performed in twice: in the live tour Bitter and Sweet instead of "Meu amor é..." and NHK's music television program Young Studio. The single debuted at number 5 on the Oricon Weekly Single Charts and became the 20th best sold single in 1985. In The Best Ten ranking, it debuted on number 6 and stayed at number 45 in the yearly chart.

Dear Friend is the twenty-fourth single on 17 July 1990. It was Nakamori's first single to be released after one year of hiatus. The single debuted at number 1 on Oricon Single Weekly Chart and became the 6th best sold single in 1990.

Mizu ni Sashita Hana is the twenty-fifth single on 6 November 1990. It was promoted as a theme song to the Wednesday series of the Japanese television drama Wednesday Grand Romance. The single debuted at number 1 on Oricon Single Weekly Chart and became the 92nd best sold single in 1990 and 76th best sold single in 1991.

Futari Shizuka is the twenty-sixth single released on 25 March 1991. While the writes's version of the song, Makoto Sekiguchi (ex. C-C-B) was used as a theme song to the movie Tenkawa Densetsu Satsujin Jiken, Nakamori's version was used as a commercial song to the movie. The single debuted at number 3 on Oricon Single Weekly Chart and became the 21st best sold single in 1991.

== Chart performance ==
The album debuted at number 6 on the Oricon Weekly Album Charts and charted for 7 weeks.

== Track listing ==
No.	Title	Lyrics	Music	Arrangement	Length
1.	"Futari Shizuka: Tenkawa Densetsu Satsujin Jiken yori"	Takashi Matsumoto	Makoto Sekiguchi	Akira Inoue	4:09
2.	"Dear Friend"	Mayumi Ito	Kazuya Izumi	Izumi, Kei Wakakusa	4:41
3.	"La bohème"	Reiko Yukawa	Takashi Tsushimi	Kazuo Shiina	4:39
4.	"Eki"	Mariya Takeuchi	Takeuchi	Shiina	5:01
5.	"Blue on Pink"	Yoshiko Miura	Wataru Kuniyasu	Wakakusa	3:42
6.	"Mizu ni Sashita Hana"	Natsumi Tadano	Junko Hirotani	Akira Nishihira	4:25
7.	"Liar" (single version)	Mitsuko Shiramine	Izumi	Nishihira	4:35
8.	"Caribbean"	Miho Onishi	Izumi	Izumi	4:37
9.	"Akaitori Nigeta"	Chinfa Kan	Naoya Matsuoka	Matsuoka	5:06
10.	"Angel Eyes"	Gorō Matsui	Chika Ueda	Satoshi Nakamura, Satoshi Takebe	4:32
11.	"Wasurete..."	Akina Nakamori	Kenji Hasama	Atsushi Onozawa	2:50
12.	"Oh No, Oh Yes!"	Takeuchi	Takeuchi	Shiina	4:46
Total length:					52:41

== Covers ==
=== Dear Friend ===
- Mayumi Ito, original writer of the song covered in her 1992 album Bijin Koe (美人声).

=== Futari Shizuka ===
- Makoto Sekiguchi, original writer and composer of the song covered as a single in 1991 and included in his album Itazura (悪戯) released on the same year.

== Release history ==
Year	Format(s)	Serial number	Label(s)	Ref.
1992	CT, CD	WPTL-711, WPCL-711	Warner Pioneer	
2006	CD, digital download	WPCL-10343	Warner Pioneer	
2012	Super Audio CD, CD hybrid	WPCL-11151	Warner Pioneer	
2018	LP, CD	WPJL-10100, WPCL-12906	Warner Pioneer	
2024	2CD, 2CD+2LP+Cassette tape, 2LP	WPCL-13537/8; WPZL-32109/13; WPJL-10211/2	Warner Pioneer	

Notes:

- 2006 re-release includes 24-bit digitally remastered sound source
- 2012 and 2014 re-release includes subtitles in the tracks "2012 remaster"
- 2024 re-release includes lacquer remaster which includes subtitles in the tracks "2024 lacquer remaster" along with original karaoke version of the tracks
