= Mizu ni Sashita Hana =

Single by Akina Nakamori

from the album Best III
- Language: Japanese
- English title: Flowers in Water
- B-side: "Angel Eyes"
- Released: November 6, 1990
- Recorded: 1990
- Genre: J-pop; kayōkyoku
- Length: 4:27
- Label: Reprise Records
- Composer: Junko Hirotani
- Lyricist: Natsumi Tadano

Akina Nakamori singles chronology
"Dear Friend" (1990)	"Mizu ni Sashita Hana" (1990)	"Futari Shizuka: Tenkawa Densetsu Satsujin Jiken yori" (1991)

Music videos
- "Mizu ni Sashita Hana" (Live) on YouTube

"Mizu ni Sashita Hana" (水に挿した花; lit. "Flowers in Water") is the 25th single by Japanese entertainer Akina Nakamori. Written by Natsumi Tadano and Junko Hirotani, the single was released on November 6, 1990, by Warner Pioneer through the Reprise label. It was also the second single from her fifth compilation album Best III.

== Background ==
"Mizu ni Sashita Hana" was used as the theme song of the NTV drama series Suiyo Grand Romance (水曜グランドロマン, Suiyō Gurando Roman; lit. Wednesday Grand Romance). Nakamori has re-recorded the song for the 1995 compilation True Album Akina 95 Best and the 2002 self-cover compilation Utahime Double Decade.

== Chart performance ==
"Mizu ni Sashita Hana" became Nakamori's 22nd and final No. 1 on Oricon's weekly singles chart and sold over 339,800 copies. It was also certified Gold by the RIAJ.

== Track listing ==
Original release
No.	Title	Lyrics	Music	Arrangement	Length
1.	"Mizu ni Sashita Hana" ((水に挿した花; "Flowers in Water"))	Natsumi Tadano	Junko Hirotani	Akira Nishihira	4:27
2.	"Angel Eyes"	Gorō Matsui	Chika Ueda	Satoshi Nakamura; Satoshi Takebe	4:31
Total length:					8:58

1998 reissue bonus track
No.	Title	Lyrics	Music	Length
3.	"Mizu ni Sashita Hana (Live Version)" ((水に挿した花(LIVE VERSION)))	Tadano	Hirotani

== Charts ==
Chart (1990)	Peak position
Japan (Oricon)	1

== Certification ==
Region	Certification	Certified units/sales
Japan (RIAJ)	Gold	200,000^{^}
^{^} Shipments figures based on certification alone.

== Release history ==
Year	Format(s)	Serial number	Label(s)	Ref.
1990	8cm CD, CT	WPDL-4190, WPSL-4190	Warner Pioneer	
1998	12cm CD	WPC6-8681	Warner Pioneer	
2008	Digital download	-	Warner Pioneer	
2014	Digital download - remaster	-	Warner Pioneer	

== See also ==
- 1990 in Japanese music
