= Kawaikute Gomen =

2022 song by HoneyWorks

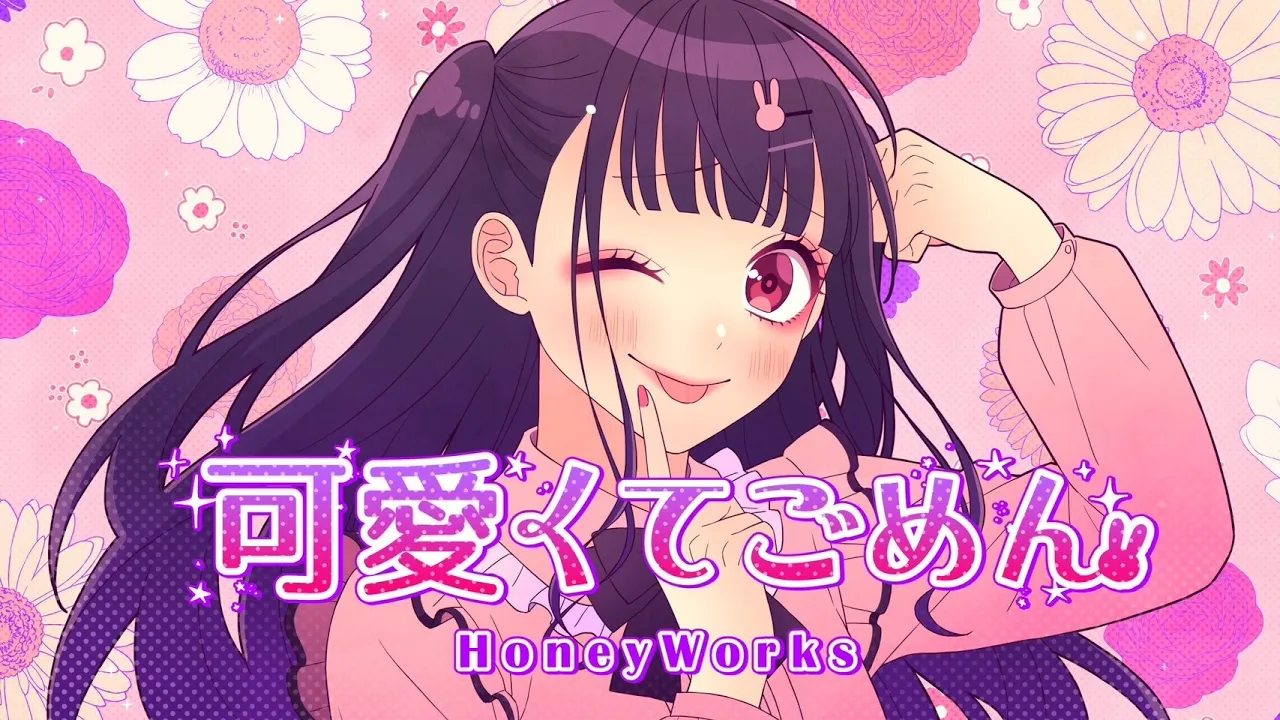

Song by HoneyWorks featuring Capi

from the album Kokuhaku Jikkō Iinkai Flying Songs: Koishiteru
- Language: Japanese
- English title: "Sorry for Being Cute"
- Released: August 13, 2022
- Genre: J-pop
- Length: 3:39
- Label: HoneyWorks
- Songwriter: Shito
- Producer: HoneyWorks

Music video
- "Kawaikute Gomen" on YouTube

"Kawaikute Gomen" (Japanese: 可愛くてごめん; lit. 'I'm Sorry for Being So Cute') is a song by the Japanese musical group HoneyWorks. Written by group member Shito, it is a pop track about "valuing ourselves more" and "being straightforward about things we love." It serves as the character song of Chizuru Nakamura, also known by her persona Chuu-tan. The character appeared in the 2022 anime series Heroines Run the Show, which is part of HoneyWorks' Kokuhaku Jikkō Iinkai: Ren'ai Series multimedia project.

The first version featuring Capi was released on August 13, 2022, as part of HoneyWorks' album Kokuhaku Jikkō Iinkai Flying Songs: Koishiteru. The second version featuring Saori Hayami, the voice of Chizuru Nakamura in the anime series, was released as a digital single on November 21 through Music Ray'n. Both versions of the song became popular on TikTok, spawning a viral dance challenge and cover versions by various artists. Capi's version peaked atop Billboard Japan's TikTok Weekly Top 20 chart and later ranked first on the year-end TikTok Songs Chart for 2023, and Hayami's version was certified gold for streaming by the Recording Industry Association of Japan.

A manga adaptation of the song by Ruia Shimakage began serialization in Line Manga in March 2024, with four tankōbon volumes published by Futabasha.

== Background and release ==
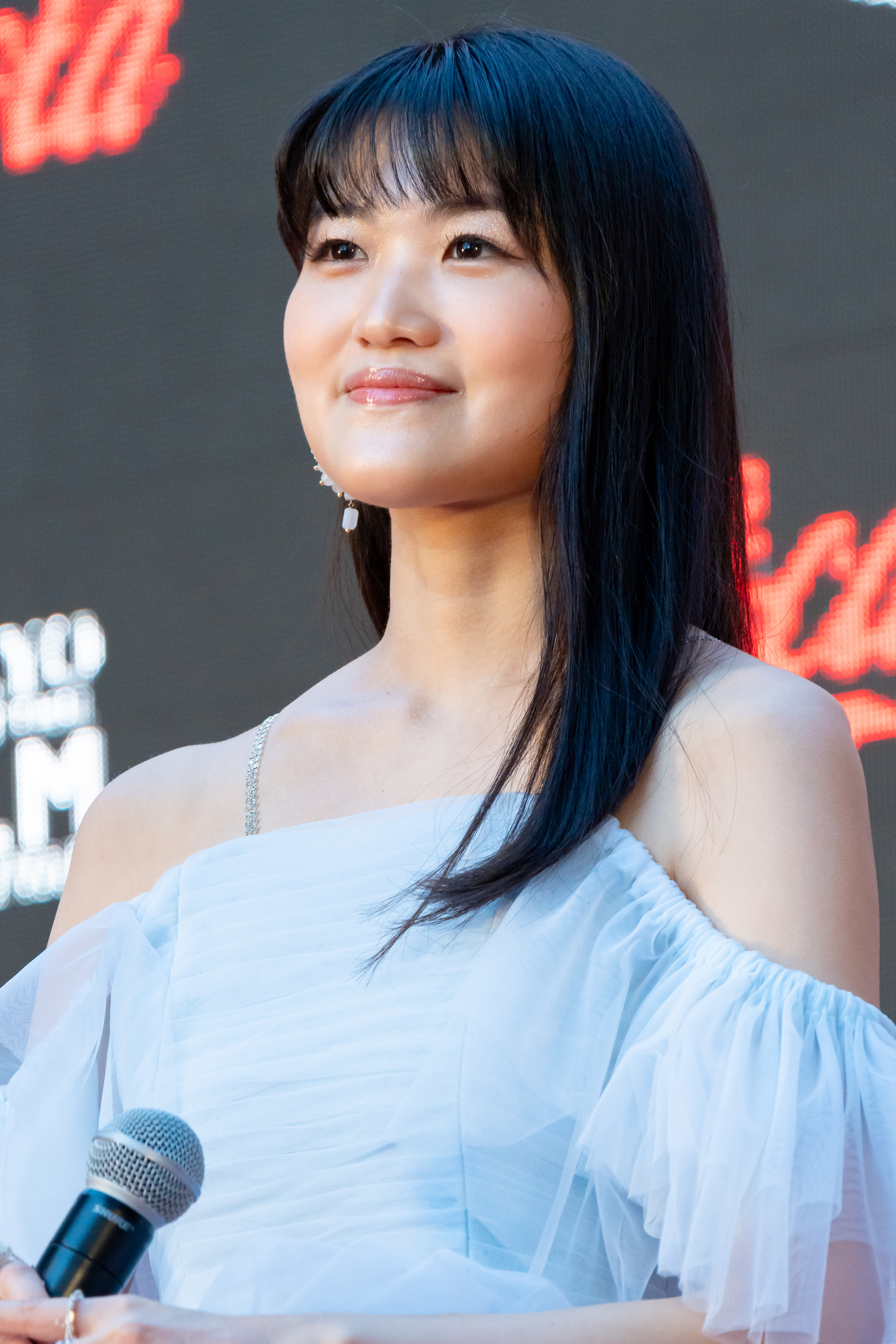
Saori Hayami voiced Chizuru Nakamura in Heroines Run the Show and performed the second version of "Kawaikute Gomen".

Chizuru Nakamura, also known by her persona Chuu-tan, is a character voiced by Saori Hayami in the anime series Heroines Run the Show (2022), a part of the Kokuhaku Jikkō Iinkai: Ren'ai Series multimedia project by the musical group HoneyWorks. In the series, Chizuru is a shy student who is a fan of the idol duo Lip×Lip. She uses her Chuu-tan persona, who has an outgoing personality, while working at a maid café or when engaging in oshikatsu for Lip×Lip.

In July 2022, HoneyWorks announced that they would release the doujin album Kokuhaku Jikkō Iinkai Flying Songs: Koishiteru at Comiket 100 on August 13. "Kawaikute Gomen", featuring Capi as the vocalist, is included as the seventh track and serves as the character song of Chuu-tan. The album was later released for download and streaming on August 28.

== Composition ==
"Kawaikute Gomen" is a pop song with a length of 3 minutes and 39 seconds and a tempo of 160 beats per minute. It was produced in Cubase and incorporates various instruments, such as the synthesizer, glockenspiel, piano, xylophone, harp, drums, guitar, and bass guitar. The recording was mixed by Satoshi Yoneda, a long-time collaborator of HoneyWorks. Group member Shito wrote the song and stated that it is about "valuing ourselves more" and "being straightforward about things we love." Shito stated that they aimed to incorporate musical elements that were popular on TikTok and other platforms, which tended to be songs with repetitive and easy-to-understand lyrics. The combination of Kawaii (可愛い; lit. 'cute') and Gomen (ごめん; lit. 'I'm sorry'), which are "words that everyone has heard, but which feel unbalanced", in the lyrics served as the song's hook.

The chorus uses Chu! (Note: A Japanese onomatopoeia for the sound of a kiss) and Gomen in repetition to refer to the charms of the song's heroine. According to Mio Komachi of The Magazine, the lyrics imply that the character likes herself and does not feel apologetic. Komachi added that "the snappy guitar strumming and obbligato create a rhythm that makes you want to dance." Real Sound writer Z11 stated that the chorus "exudes a positive attitude with high self-esteem," and described Capi's vocals as "delicate yet strong."

== Saori Hayami version ==
"Kawaikute Gomen"
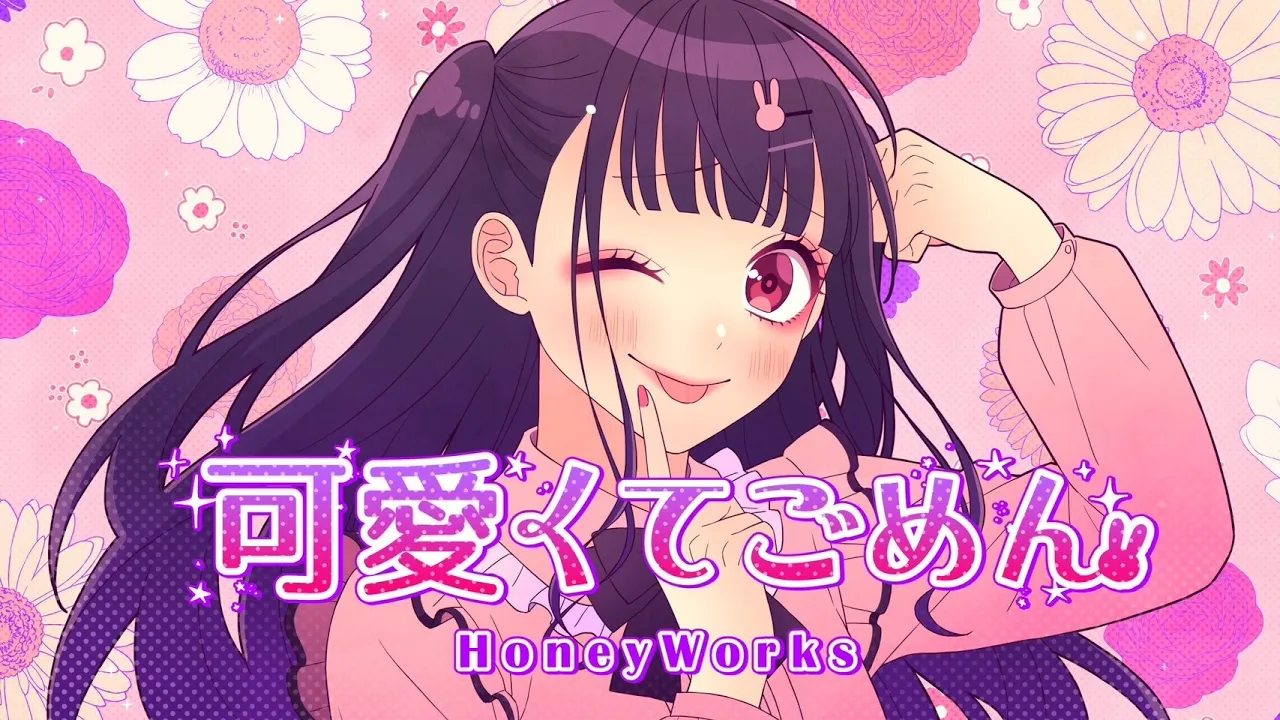

Single by HoneyWorks featuring Chuu-tan (Saori Hayami)
- Language: Japanese
- Released: November 21, 2022
- Genre: J-pop; anime song
- Length: 3:39
- Label: Music Ray'n
- Songwriter: Shito
- Producer: HoneyWorks

Music video
- "Kawaikute Gomen" on YouTube
- Music video of Saori Hayami's version: file; help
- Audio of Saori Hayami's version: file; help

On November 21, 2022, HoneyWorks released "Kawaikute Gomen" as a digital single through Music Ray'n, featuring vocals from Hayami as the character Chuu-tan. The music videos for Capi's and Hayami's versions were released three days prior; they are animated by Kanata and contain illustrations by HoneyWorks support member TMK. Hayami's version was later included in HoneyWorks' sixth album Nee, Suki tte Itai yo: Kokuhaku Jikkō Iinkai Character Song Collection, released on March 15, 2023.

== Commercial performance ==
Both versions of "Kawaikute Gomen" quickly rose to popularity on TikTok and was used as the background music for makeup videos and videos using the "Manga AI" filter. The song became the subject of an Internet challenge that went viral in Japan involving people dancing to its lyrics. In late 2022, various K-pop artists – including Seventeen, NCT, and Ive – have also released dance videos using the song. Capi's version was among the most played, liked, and shared songs by TikTok's Japanese userbase in that year. It was used on approximately four million videos and had a cumulative view count of 34.6 billion by April 2023. The song debuted at number eight on Billboard Japan's TikTok Weekly Top 20 chart dated October 12, 2022. It reached number one on the chart dated November 2 and remained at the top for six consecutive weeks. Capi's version had charted 58 times by November 2023 and ranked first on Billboard Japan's year-end TikTok Songs Chart for 2023. The song also peaked at number 41 on the Billboard Japan Hot 100 and at number 33 on the Oricon Combined Singles Chart.

Hayami's version entered at number 18 on the TikTok Weekly Top 20 chart dated February 22, 2023. It reached number 21 on Billboard Japan's Download Songs chart and number 20 on Oricon's Digital Singles Chart. The song's music video ranked first on Oricon's YouTube Chart 13 weeks after it had first charted. It had over 183 million views on YouTube by June 2026. In September 2025, the song was certified gold for streaming by the Recording Industry Association of Japan.

Capi's version was nominated for Top UGC Music for 2022 at TuneCore Japan's Independent Artist Awards. In 2023, it was nominated in the music category of the TikTok First Half Trend Awards. The song also ranked fourth in the music category of the 2023 Yahoo! Japan Search Awards. In 2024, it won the Silver Award at the JASRAC Awards for generating the second-highest royalty distribution among domestic works during the 2023 fiscal year.

== Covers and other appearances ==
"Kawaikute Gomen" was covered by various artists. The idol group Takane no Nadeshiko, whose music is produced by HoneyWorks, released an official cover of the song in 2022. The following year, actress Yuna Hoshino, singer Kohana Lam, and the VTuber agency Hololive Production collaborated with HoneyWorks for their covers. Singer Mafumafu released a cover on YouTube on June 24, 2023. Singer Ado and musician Yucco Miller also released cover versions for their respective albums Ado's Utattemita Album and Ambivalent. The song was also covered for the video games World Dai Star: Yume no Stellarium, BanG Dream! Girls Band Party!, The Idolmaster Cinderella Girls: Starlight Stage, and D4DJ Groovy Mix. Voice actress Sumire Uesaka covered "Kawaikute Gomen" as the character Alya, which served as the second ending theme for the 2024 anime series Alya Sometimes Hides Her Feelings in Russian. Girl group AKB48 covered the song, with Momoka Itō as the vocalist, as part of their 2024 cover album Nantettatte AKB48. In January 2025, voice actress Yū Sasahara covered the song as her character Puniru, which serves as the fourth installment for the 2024 anime series Puniru Is a Cute Slime's cover song project. In March, HoneyWorks released the album Haniwa Kyoku Utattemita: 10th Anniversary Seiyū Collaboration, which included a cover version by voice actress Sora Amamiya as the character Sena Narumi.

In December 2023, Hayami's version was featured in the Sega arcade game Chunithm Luminous as a playable song. The following year, the song was added to Bandai Namco Entertainment's mobile game Taiko no Tatsujin: Rhythm Connect in February, and it was released as downloadable content for Taiko no Tatsujin: Rhythm Festival in March. Hayami performed the song during the second day of the Animelo Summer Live music festival on August 31, 2024.

== Personnel ==
Credits are adapted from YouTube and Sound & Recording Magazine.

- Capi – vocals (first version)
- Saori Hayami – vocals (second version)
- Shito – songwriting
- HoneyWorks – arrangement
- Nakanishi – guitar
- Sato – bass
- Keiki Uto – piano
- Leon Yūki – drums
- Satoshi Yoneda – mixing engineer

== Charts ==
=== Weekly charts ===
Chart performance for "Kawaikute Gomen" (featuring Capi)
Chart (2022)	Peak position
Japan (Japan Hot 100)	41
Japan Combined Singles (Oricon)	33

Chart performance for "Kawaikute Gomen" (featuring Saori Hayami)
Chart (2023)	Peak position
Japan Download Songs (Billboard Japan)	21
Japan Digital Singles (Oricon)	20

=== Year-end charts ===
2023 year-end chart performance for "Kawaikute Gomen" (featuring Capi)
Chart (2023)	Position
Japan (Japan Hot 100)	94

== Certifications ==
Certifications for "Kawaikute Gomen"
Region	Certification	Certified units/sales
Japan (RIAJ) Saori Hayami version	Gold	50,000,000^{†}
^{†} Streaming-only figures based on certification alone.

== Manga adaptation ==
A manga adaptation of the song began serialization in Line Manga on March 4, 2024. It is illustrated by Ruia Shimakage, who worked on the manga adaptation of Heroines Run the Show, and contains an original story based on the events depicted in the music video of "Kawaikute Gomen" and later songs. Futabasha published four tankōbon volumes from May 16, 2024, to July 10, 2026.

No.	Release date	ISBN
1	May 16, 2024	978-4-575-44055-3
2	January 21, 2025	978-4-575-44072-0
3	November 13, 2025	978-4-575-44102-4
4	July 10, 2026	978-4-575-44128-4
