= Image song =

Song related to a fictional work, sung in-character

In the context of J-pop music, an image song or character song is a song on a tie-in single or album (often called an image album or character album) for an anime, video game, drama, manga, or other commercial product that is sometimes sung by the voice actor or actor of a character, in character with harmonies. It is meant to give a sense of the personality of the character.

Character songs are considered an important part of an anime or drama's success, as they often provide insights into a character that may otherwise go unexplored in the program itself. The series' creators may also include details about a particular character's design stages and evolution, and occasions, even design sketches; this way, fans can see for themselves how a character changed. There may also be comments from the voice actors or actors on how they feel about playing their characters. Sometimes character songs are incorporated into the anime itself, such as Kyōran Kazoku Nikki, which has each of its main characters sing a character song as the ending theme, each with its own animation. Another example is Prince of Tennis, which has the opening and ending songs for the OVA episodes sung by characters in the anime.

Character songs are not restricted to anime protagonists. Antagonists such as Zechs Merquise, Master Asia, Sailor Galaxia, Vegeta, and some villains (such as Devimon and Sousuke Aizen) also have their own character songs. In some cases, these are regarded as more interesting than those of the protagonists, as they often provide the only glimpse into a villain's character.

In addition, fans are known to buy character song albums based solely on the voice actor or actor. An example of this is Megumi Hayashibara, a well-known voice actress who has released many CDs and albums over her career, including character songs of her characters.

The first anime character song album to reach No. 1 in the Japanese Oricon weekly charts was Hōkago Tea Time (放課後ティータイム, After School Tea Time), performed by the characters from K-On! in 2009, debuting at No. 1 with sales of 67,000 copies in its first week. The K-On! characters later became the first anime image group to reach No. 1 in the Oricon singles chart in 2010, with the opening theme for the second season of the show, "Go! Go! Maniac!", which debuted at No. 1 with sales of over 83,000 copies in its first week.

== Character version ==
A related sub-type is a character version, where a voice actor or actor sings a song from the series as the character. Famous examples of this include the various versions of Neon Genesis Evangelion's theme songs, redone by the voice actresses of Rei Ayanami, Asuka Langley Soryu, and Misato Katsuragi. They are usually identified by a version tag at the end of the name (e.g., "Cruel Angel's Thesis, Ayanami Version").

== Character song ==
"Kawaikute Gomen", the character song of Chizuru Nakamura from the anime series Heroines Run the Show voiced by Saori Hayami.

Similarly, a character song can also be a song about a character, but not necessarily sung by the character's portrayer. For example, while Mazinger Z includes songs about Kouji Kabuto and his friends, they are not sung by their voice actors. Nevertheless, they still provide some insight into the character's persona.

In the Pokémon television series, Dawn and Serena's image songs were not originally sung by their voice actors either, although their voice actors' versions were later introduced.

== See also ==
- Leitmotif
