= Aibu (song) =

Single by Akina Nakamori

from the album Unbalance+Balance
- Language: Japanese
- English title: Caress
- A-side: "Kataomoi"
- Released: March 24, 1994
- Recorded: 1993
- Genre: J-pop; dance-pop
- Length: 5:13
- Label: MCA Victor
- Composer: Tetsuya Komuro
- Lyricist: Takashi Matsumoto
- Producer: Tetsuya Komuro

Akina Nakamori singles chronology
"Everlasting Love" (1993)	"Aibu" / "Kataomoi" (1994)	"Yoru no Doko ka de (Night Shift)" (1994)

"Aibu" (愛撫; lit. "Caress") is a song by Japanese entertainer Akina Nakamori. Written by Takashi Matsumoto and Tetsuya Komuro, it was released as a double-A single with "Kataomoi" on March 24, 1994, by MCA Victor. It was also the second single from her 15th studio album Unbalance+Balance.

== Background ==
"Aibu" was one of two songs written by Matsumoto and Komuro (the other being "Norma Jean") for Unbalance+Balannce, which was in production since summer 1992 to the album's release on September 22, 1993. It was originally planned to be released as Nakamori's first single under MCA Victor, but "Everlasting Love" was ultimately chosen instead. "Aibu" was eventually selected as the double A-side of "Kataomoi", a song originally made popular by Mie Nakao in the 1970s.

== Chart performance ==
"Kataomoi"/"Aibu" peaked at No. 17 on Oricon's weekly singles chart and sold over 133,900 copies.

== Track listing ==
Original release
No.	Title	Lyrics	Music	Arrangement	Length
1.	"Kataomoi" ((片想い; "Unrequited Love"))	Kazumi Yasui	Makoto Kawaguchi	Akira Senju	3:54
2.	"Aibu" ((愛撫; "Caress"))	Takashi Matsumoto	Tetsuya Komuro	Komuro	5:13
3.	"Kataomoi" (Karaoke)				3:54
4.	"Aibu" (Karaoke)				5:13
Total length:					18:14

== Charts ==
Chart (1994)	Peak position
Japan (Oricon)	17
