= Dear Friend (Akina Nakamori song) =

Single by Akina Nakamori

from the album Best III
- Language: Japanese
- B-side: "Caribbean"
- Released: July 17, 1990
- Recorded: May–June 1990
- Studio: The Hit Factory
- Genre: J-pop; kayōkyoku
- Length: 4:35
- Label: Reprise Records
- Composer: Kazuya Izumi
- Lyricist: Mayumi Itō

Akina Nakamori singles chronology
| "Liar" (1989) | "Dear Friend" (1990) | "Mizu ni Sashita Hana" (1990) |

Music videos
- "Dear Friend" on YouTube

"Dear Friend" (ディア・フレンド, Dia Furendo) is the 24th single by Japanese entertainer Akina Nakamori. Written by Mayumi Itō and Kazuya Izumi, the single was released on July 17, 1990, by Warner Pioneer through the Reprise label. It was also the lead single from her fifth compilation album Best III.

== Background ==
"Dear Friend" marked Nakamori's return to the music charts one year after her suicide attempt. According to Warner Pioneer chief producer Katsumi Fujikura, the song was selected as Nakamori's next single because it "gives courage, energy, and makes people who listen to it brighter." Nakamori recorded the song at The Hit Factory in New York City. At the same time, she traveled to the Bahamas to shoot the music video, as well as have photographs taken for her photo book My Life 1990: A-K-I-N-A Nakamori.

== Chart performance ==
"Dear Friend" became Nakamori's 21st No. 1 on Oricon's weekly singles chart and sold over 547,900 copies. It was also certified Platinum by the RIAJ.

== Track listing ==
All music is composed by Kazuya Izumi.

Original release
| No. | Title | Lyrics | Arrangement | Length |
|---|---|---|---|---|
| 1. | "Dear Friend" | Mayumi Itō | Izumi; Kei Wakakusa | 4:41 |
| 2. | "Caribbean" | Miho Onishi | Izumi | 4:35 |
| Total length: | | | | 9:16 |

1998 reissue bonus track
| No. | Title | Lyrics | Length |
|---|---|---|---|
| 3. | "Dear Friend" (Live Version) | Itō |

== Charts ==
| Chart (1990) | Peak position |
|---|---|
| Japan (Oricon) | 1 |

== Certification ==
| Region | Certification | Certified units/sales |
|---|---|---|
| Japan (RIAJ) | Platinum | 400,000^{^} |
^{^} Shipments figures based on certification alone.

== Release history ==
| Year | Format(s) | Serial number | Label(s) | Ref. |
|---|---|---|---|---|
| 1990 | 8cm CD, CT | WPDL-4173, WPSL-4173 | Warner Pioneer | |
| 1998 | 12cm CD | WPC6-8681 | Warner Pioneer | |
| 2008 | Digital download | - | Warner Pioneer | |
| 2014 | Digital download - remaster | - | Warner Pioneer | |

== See also ==
- 1990 in Japanese music
