= Run for Money: The Great Mission =

Japanese anime television series

- 逃走中 グレートミッション
- Based on: Run for Money by Fuji Television
- Written by: Tomohiro Nakayama
- Directed by: Yukio Kaizawa; Kohei Kureta
- Voices of: Showtaro Morikubo; Yumiko Kobayashi; Marina Inoue; Ryōtarō Okiayu; Kazuya Nakai; Shino Shimoji
- Narrated by: Mark Okita
- Music by: Kōtarō Nakagawa
- Opening theme: "Runaway World" by fhána
- Country of origin: Japan
- Original language: Japanese
- No. of episodes: 97

Production
- Producers: Koya Watanabe; Naoko Sagawa; Mayumi Yokomizo; Hiroyuki Sakurada; Shintarō Hashimoto; Shinji Takada
- Production companies: Fuji Television; Yomiko Advertising; Toei Animation

Original release
- Network: Fuji Television
- Release: April 2, 2023 – March 30, 2025

Run for Money: The Great Mission (逃走中 グレートミッション, Tōsōchū: Gurēto Misshon) is a Japanese anime television series based on the game show Run for Money created by Fuji Television. Produced by Toei Animation, the series serves as the second television series in the Run for Money franchise and the first to be animated and premiered on Fuji TV and other stations on April 2, 2023, and ended on March 30, 2025.

== Plot ==
In a futuristic timeline, where humanity migrated to the Moon due to Earth's climate change. Even among the lunar colonies, only one thing remains popular to the citizens, a game show called "Run for Money", an entertainment survival game in which "fugitives" are released into a limited area and must escape the pursuing android "hunters" until the time limit counts down to zero, the last one(s) standing can win a large prize. Some dream of getting rich, while others challenge themselves to test their strength.

== Cast ==
Character	Voice actor
Sawyer Tomura	Showtaro Morikubo
Hal Tomura	Yumiko Kobayashi
Luna Nishinotoin	Marina Inoue
Morris Shoemaker	Ryōtarō Okiayu
Sigma Redwing/Phantom Thief Appolon	Kazuya Nakai
Rabbi	Shino Shimoji

== Production ==
The series was announced on December 31, 2022, following a broadcast of the New Year's Eve edition of the Run for Money show. The show's principal voice cast and staff were revealed on February 9, 2022. More cast members for the show's first part as well as the show's theme song performer were revealed on March 10th of that same year. The series was directed by Yukio Kaizawa and Kohei Kureta with Tomohiro Nakayama handling series scripts and Kōtarō Nakagawa composing the music. Yoichi Onishi is credited for the character designs while Shohei Tamura handles the overall stage design.

== Soundtrack ==
The series uses one opening theme for the entire series titled "Runaway World" performed by Fhána. For episodes 1-13, the series' ending theme is titled "Fly Away" by AB6IX. For episodes 13-24, the ending theme is titled "Top Speed" by Wienners. For episodes 25-37, the ending theme is titled "Kokkishin" by Mr.forte. For episodes 38-49, the ending theme is titled "Baddest Behavior" by Tempest. For episodes 50-62, the ending theme is titled "Birimi" by ICEx. For episodes 63-74, the ending theme is titled "Taihen de Escape" by AXXX1S. For episodes 75-86, the ending theme is titled "Adrenaline Game" by Takane no Nadeshiko. Since episode 87, the ending theme is titled "Jibun Kilogram" by ALL-IN.
