= Tetsuya Yanagisawa =

Japanese animator

Tetsuya Yanagisawa (柳沢テツヤ, Yanagisawa Tetsuya) is a Japanese animator, storyboard artist, and director.

== Works (as director) ==
- Kannazuki no Miko (TV series, 2004)
- Shattered Angels (TV series, 2007)
- Heaven's Lost Property the Movie: The Angeloid of Clockwork (Film, 2011)
- High School DxD (TV series, 2012)
- World War Blue (TV series, 2012)
- High School DxD New (TV series, 2013)
- Daimidaler: Prince vs Penguin Empire (TV series, 2014)
- Bladedance of Elementalers (TV series, 2014)
- High School DxD BorN (TV series, 2015)
- Zutto Mae Kara Suki Deshita: Kokuhaku Jikkō Iinkai (Film, 2016)
- Suki ni Naru Sono Shunkan o (Film, 2016)
- Senran Kagura Shinovi Master -Tokyo Yōma-hen- (TV series, 2018)
- Orient (TV series, 2022)
- Berserk of Gluttony (TV series, 2023–present)
- I'm the Evil Lord of an Intergalactic Empire! (TV series, 2025)
- The Remarried Empress (TV series, 2027)
