= Zutto Mae Kara Suki Deshita =

Zutto Mae Kara Suki Deshita: Kokuhaku Jikkō Iinkai
- Poster

Japanese name
- Kanji: ずっと前から好きでした。～告白実行委員会～
- Directed by: Tetsuya Yanagisawa
- Screenplay by: Yoshimi Narita
- Based on: Kokuhaku Jikkō Iinkai ~Ren'ai Series~ by HoneyWorks
- Produced by: Shunsuke Saito
- Starring: Hiroshi Kamiya; Haruka Tomatsu; Yuki Kaji; Kana Asumi; Kenichi Suzumura; Aki Toyosaki; Tsubasa Yonaga
- Edited by: Aya Hida
- Production companies: Aniplex; Dentsu; Fuji Television Network; Incs Toenter; Kadokawa; Lawson; MCIP Holdings; Movic; Music Ray'n; Qualia Animation (Note: There is no evidence that a company or studio named Qualia Animation exists. However, much of the film's staff is made up of TNK's staff, including the film's animation producer, who is TNK's representative director Keisuke Kawai.)
- Distributed by: Aniplex
- Release date: April 23, 2016
- Running time: 63 minutes
- Country: Japan
- Language: Japanese
- Box office: ¥70.5 million

Zutto Mae Kara Suki Deshita: Kokuhaku Jikkō Iinkai (ずっと前から好きでした。～告白実行委員会～), also known by its English title I've Always Liked You, is a 2016 anime romance film directed by Tetsuya Yanagisawa, written by Yoshimi Narita and produced by Qualia Animation. The film is based on the Kokuhaku Jikkō Iinkai ~Ren'ai Series~ Vocaloid song project by HoneyWorks. It revolves around a group of high school friends, who struggle to confess their love.

Zutto Mae Kara Suki Deshita: Kokuhaku Jikkō Iinkai was released in Japan by Aniplex on April 23, 2016 and is available on Crunchyroll. A sequel titled Suki ni Naru Sono Shunkan o was released on December 17, 2016 in Japan.

== Plot ==
The movie is centered on a group of high school friends who struggle to confess their love. The story begins when Natsuki Enomoto confesses to her childhood friend Yu Setoguchi. The movie cuts to its opening, Blooming into the Color of Love ("Koi-iro ni Sake"). After the opening, an embarrassed Natsuki denies her love for Yu and calls it a "practice confession." The next day Natsuki is confronted by her friends, Akari Hayasaka and Mio Aida, and admits her failed confession. Her friends cheer her on and discuss Mio's love life; Mio has feelings for her close friend Haruki Serizawa. Although Mio and Natsuki are having problems confessing their love, Akari remains untroubled by the possibility of unrequited love. However, she is the main focus of a boy in her class named Sota Mochizuki, who has been in love with her since the opening ceremony of school. Sota, nicknamed Mochita by his friends, has never talked to Akari and constantly has conversations with his devilish conscience about whether to confess his love. As Sota is feeling alone in his battle to tell Akari, he notices that one of his classmates, Koyuki Ayase, is secretly in love with Natsuki. Koyuki has changed his look, no longer wearing glasses and having cut his hair.

After school, Natsuki goes over to Yu's house and plays videos game with his sister, Hina Setoguchi. When Yu arrives home they begin studying and Natsuki asks Yu what he would do if she got a boyfriend. He responds he would support her, even though he is secretly in love with her. The next day Sota musters up the courage to say good morning to Akari and tells her about her bedhead, making it the first time they have spoken to one another. She tells him it is their little secret and he falls in love with her more, pondering who she could like. At lunch, Natsuki, Mio, and Akari are talking about their guy troubles when Koyuki gives Natsuki tickets to a HoneyWorks concert. Ecstatic, she accepts and chases after him to ask him questions about merchandise while her friends question if the concert is a date or not. After school, Natsuki decides not to hang out with Yu and instead picks out her outfit for the concert. Natsuki's brother, Kotaro Enomoto, asks about Hina, whom he likes, and Natsuki teases him which results in bickering. The scene shifts to Yu's home where he is eating dinner with Hina. Hina comments on Kotaro's temper and how he will never get a girlfriend.

The next morning Yu is returning a DVD to Natsuki and learns about her concert date with Koyuki. The two fight about her outfit, but are actually fighting about their relationship. Natsuki goes to the concert and has a great time until one of the songs (Diagnosis: Lovesickness ("Byoumei Koi Wazura")) makes her realize she is in love with Yu. Koyuki walks her home and notices Natsuki looking at Yu's house. Thinking about Natsuki and Yu's previous fight, Koyuki hugs Natsuki and tries to confess, saying he would not make her sad as Yu had. Koyuki is interrupted by Yu and the two argue about their hidden feelings in front of Natsuki, who begins to cry. Yu ends the conversation by leading Natsuki home. That night, Yu tries but fails to text Natsuki about his feelings. The next morning before school, the two pretend as if nothing has happened and walk together. Once at school, Koyuki apologizes to Natsuki.

On a train to school, Sota, still thinking over Akari, sees a trio of students from another school and gives up his seat to one of them and heads over to the next train car. Akari, riding on the same train, notices his act of kindness. Later during lunch, Sota gets motivation from Koyuki and musters his courage to confess his love to Akari; she accepts his confession and they walk to a cake shop after school.

Meanwhile, Haruki gets advice from their teacher, Mr. Akechi, about his feelings for Mio. Natsuki recalls a memory of witnessing a first-year student delivering an unsuccessful confession to Yu. Troubled, Natsuki goes to Mio for advice. Afterward, she musters her own personal courage and tells Yu to wait for her. The next day after school, she gathers her courage and confesses, but Yu still thinks that he was not the one she loves. He tells her she passed her confession rehearsal and wishes her luck in the real one. As he is about to leave, he is confronted by a crying Natsuki who finally tells him that the practice was a lie and her confessions were actually real. Yu embraces her, telling her that he accepts her feelings. The ending credits, Our Fraction of a Second ("Ippun Ichibyou Kimi to Boku no"), plays.

In the mid-credits, Koyuki silently congratulates Natsuki in the background for finally confessing to Yu and getting accepted. Meanwhile, Hina is seen standing at the school lockers holding a letter, possibly a love letter that was meant for someone. After the credits, Natsuki barges into Yu's bedroom and wakes him, questioning his feelings for her since he didn't explicitly say that he loves her. After much pestering, Yu admits that he loves her. Natsuki is flustered and scolds him for saying it so abruptly, but happily hugs him.

== Cast ==
- Hiroshi Kamiya as Yu Setoguchi
- Haruka Tomatsu as Natsuki Enomoto
- Yuuki Kaji as Sota Mochizuki
- Kana Asumi as Akari Hayasaka
- Kenichi Suzumura as Haruki Serizawa
- Aki Toyosaki as Mio Aida
- Tsubasa Yonaga as Koyuki Ayase
- Momo Asakura as Hina Setoguchi
- Natsuki Hanae as Kotaro Enomoto
- Hikaru Midorikawa as Saku Akechi
- Sora Amamiya as Sena Narumi

== Production ==
The chief animation director and character designer is Maki Fujii. The opening song is "Koi-iro ni Sake" by CHiCO with HoneyWorks and the ending theme is "Ippun Ichibyou Kimi to Boku no" (一分一秒君と僕の) by HoneyWorks meets Sphere.

== Reception ==
The film was 8th placed on its opening weekend at the Japanese box office, with 50,528 admissions; it grossed ¥70.5 million.

== See also ==
- Cherry Blossom Memories (2016), another film based on a Vocaloid song
- Suki ni Naru Sono Shunkan o (2016), the sequel film based on the same Vocaloid project
