= Everlasting Love (Akina Nakamori song) =

Single by Akina Nakamori

from the album Lyricism: Ballad Collection
- Language: Japanese
- A-side: "Not Crazy to Me"
- Released: May 21, 1993
- Recorded: 1993
- Genre: J-pop
- Length: 4:52
- Label: MCA Victor
- Composer: Ryuichi Sakamoto
- Lyricist: Taeko Onuki
- Producer: Ryuichi Sakamoto

Akina Nakamori singles chronology
"Futari Shizuka: Tenkawa Densetsu Satsujin Jiken yori" (1991)	"Everlasting Love" (1993)	"Kataomoi" / "Aibu" (1994)

"Everlasting Love" (エヴァーラスティング・ラブ, Evārasutingu Rabu) is the 27th single by Japanese entertainer Akina Nakamori. Written by Taeko Onuki and Ryuichi Sakamoto, the song was released as a double-A single with "Not Crazy to Me" on May 21, 1993, by MCA Victor. It was also the lead single from her sixth compilation album Lyricism: Ballad Collection.

== Background ==
"Everlasting Love" marked Nakamori's return to the music industry after a two-year hiatus. After leaving Warner Pioneer in 1991, she resumed her acting career before moving to New York City in July 1992 to take a break from the entertainment business and improve her English skills. In the spring of 1993, Nakamori's management presented her Sakamoto's composition "Everlasting Love" and suggested she take a more contemporary direction in her music career.

== Chart performance ==
"Everlasting Love" peaked at No. 10 on Oricon's weekly singles chart and sold over 129,300 copies. It was also certified Gold by the RIAJ.

== Track listing ==
All music is composed and arranged by Ryuichi Sakamoto.

Original release
No.	Title	Lyrics	Length
1.	"Everlasting Love"	Taeko Onuki	4:52
2.	"Not Crazy to Me"	Nokko	4:38
3.	"Everlasting Love" (Karaoke)		4:52
4.	"Not Crazy to Me" (Karaoke)		4:37
Total length:			18:59

== Charts ==
Chart (1993)	Peak position
Japan (Oricon)	10

== Certification ==
Region	Certification	Certified units/sales
Japan (RIAJ)	Gold	200,000^{^}
^{^} Shipments figures based on certification alone.
