= Yoru no Doko ka de (Night Shift) =

Single by Akina Nakamori
- Language: Japanese
- English title: Somewhere in the Night (Night Shift)
- B-side: "Rose Bud"
- Released: September 2, 1994
- Recorded: 1994
- Genre: J-pop
- Length: 5:50
- Label: MCA Victor
- Composer: Tsugutoshi Gotō
- Lyricist: Seriko Natsuno

Akina Nakamori singles chronology
"Kataomoi" / "Aibu" (1994)	"Yoru no Doko ka de (Night Shift)" (1994)	"Gekka" (1994)

"Yoru no Doko ka de (Night Shift)" (夜のどこかで 〜night shift〜; lit. "Somewhere in the Night (Night Shift)") is the 29th single by Japanese entertainer Akina Nakamori. Written by Seriko Natsuno and Tsugutoshi Gotō, the single was released on September 2, 1994, by MCA Victor.

== Background ==
"Yoru no Doko ka de (Night Shift)" was used as the ending theme of the NTV news program NNN Kyō no Jiken (NNNきょうの出来事; lit. NNN Today's Event). Newscaster Yoshiko Sakurai appears on the single's jacket cover.

The B-side is "Rose Bud", which was used as the ending theme of the Fuji TV talk show Shingo & Shinsuke no Abunai Hanashi (新伍&紳助のあぶない話; lit. Shingo & Shinsuke's Dangerous Story).

== Chart performance ==
"Yoru no Doko ka de (Night Shift)" peaked at No. 14 on Oricon's weekly singles chart and sold over 118,000 copies.

== Track listing ==
All lyrics are written by Seriko Natsuno; all music is composed and arranged by Tsugutoshi Gotō.

Original release
No.	Title	Length
1.	"Yoru no Doko ka de (Night Shift)" ((夜のどこかで 〜night shift〜; "Somewhere in the Night (Night Shift)"))	5:50
2.	"Rose Bud"	5:17
3.	"Yoru no Doko ka de (Night Shift)" (Original Karaoke)	5:50
4.	"Rose Bud" (Original Karaoke)	5:17
Total length:		22:14

== Charts ==
Chart (1994)	Peak position
Japan (Oricon)	14
