= Kataomoi (Michiru Maki song) =

Song by Michiru Maki
- Language: Japanese
- English title: Unrequited Love
- A-side: "Suzu no Oto ga Kikoeru"
- Released: November 1, 1969
- Recorded: 1969
- Genre: Kayōkyoku
- Label: Toshiba EMI
- Composer: Makoto Kawaguchi
- Lyricist: Kazumi Yasui

"Kataomoi" (片想い; lit. "Unrequited Love") is a song written by Kazumi Yasui and Makoto Kawaguchi. It was originally recorded by Michiru Maki as the B-side of her 1969 single "Suzu no Oto ga Kikoeru" (鈴の音がきこえる; lit. "I Hear the Sound of Bells").

== Mie Nakao version ==
"Kataomoi"

Single by Mie Nakao
- Language: Japanese
- English title: Unrequited Love
- B-side: Sore ga Nani ni Naru (1971); Parking (1977)
- Released: November 5, 1971; June 10, 1977 (Reissue)
- Recorded: 1971
- Genre: Kayōkyoku
- Label: Victor
- Composer: Makoto Kawaguchi
- Lyricist: Kazumi Yasui

Mie Nakao singles chronology
"Shibai wa Owatta" (1971)	"Kataomoi" (1971)	"Kokoro no Tobira o Anata no Tame ni" (1972)

Alternative cover
- 1977 reissue cover

"Kataomoi" was covered by Mie Nakao and released as a single on November 5, 1971, by Victor Entertainment. The single did not chart upon its release, but requests for the song on a Sapporo radio station in March 1977 prompted Victor to reissue the single on June 10. The reissued single peaked at No. 28 on Oricon's weekly singles chart and sold over 300,000 copies.

=== Track listing ===
All music is arranged by Makoto Kawaguchi, except where indicated.

1971 release
No.	Title	Lyrics	Music	Length
1.	"Kataomoi" ((片想い; "Unrequited Love"))	Kazumi Yasui	Makoto Kawaguchi	3:15
2.	"Sore ga Nani ni Naru" ((それが何になる; "What Will It Be?"))	Kaori Shibata	Takashi Inoue	2:40

1977 reissue
No.	Title	Lyrics	Music	Arrangement	Length
1.	"Kataomoi"	Yasui	Kawaguchi
2.	"Parking" (Pākingu (駐車場（パーキング）))	Yoko Yamaguchi	Kunihiko Kase	Shunichi Makaino

=== Charts ===
Chart (1977)	Peak position
Japan (Oricon)	28

== Akina Nakamori version ==
"Kataomoi"

Single by Akina Nakamori

from the album Utahime
- Language: Japanese
- English title: Unrequited Love
- A-side: "Aibu"
- Released: March 24, 1994
- Recorded: 1993
- Genre: J-pop; kayōkyoku
- Length: 3:54
- Label: MCA Victor
- Composer: Makoto Kawaguchi
- Lyricist: Kazumi Yasui

Akina Nakamori singles chronology
"Everlasting Love" (1993)	"Kataomoi" / "Aibu" (1994)	"Yoru no Doko ka de (Night Shift)" (1994)

Akina Nakamori covered "Kataomoi" as her 28th single, released as a double-A single with "Aibu" on March 24, 1994, by MCA Victor. It was also the lead single from her first cover album Utahime. The single peaked at No. 17 on Oricon's weekly singles chart and sold over 133,900 copies.

=== Track listing ===
Original release
No.	Title	Lyrics	Music	Arrangement	Length
1.	"Kataomoi" ((片想い; "Unrequited Love"))	Kazumi Yasui	Makoto Kawaguchi	Akira Senju	3:54
2.	"Aibu" ((愛撫; "Caress"))	Takashi Matsumoto	Tetsuya Komuro	Komuro	5:13
3.	"Kataomoi" (Karaoke)				3:54
4.	"Aibu" (Karaoke)				5:13
Total length:					18:14

=== Charts ===
Chart (1994)	Peak position
Japan (Oricon)	17
