= C-C-B =

Japanese pop-rock band

- Also known as: Coconut Boys
- Origin: Japan
- Genres: J-Pop, rock
- Years active: 1982–1989, 2008
- Label: Polydor
- Past members: Watanabe Hideki; Ryu Kouji; Sekiguchi Makoto; Taguchi Tomoharu; Yonekawa Hideyuki
- Website: https://www.universal-music.co.jp/ccb/

C-C-B was a Japanese pop-rock band under Polydor Records label active in the years 1982–1989. At first, they were named CoConut Boys, however in 1985 the name changed to the initials, C-C-B. They became a nationwide success. In 2008, the band reformed once only with three members. The group's biggest hit, "Romantic ga Tomaranai", was used frequently in the Japanese television series Densha Otoko.

== History ==
=== 1982–1984: CoConut Boys ===
Although the band formation started in 1982, they would not debut until June 1983 with the single "Candy" and the image as the Japanese-made Beach Boys. It was promoted as an image song for a Zen-Noh's Yogurts commercial. After the single release, two early members, Yamashita and Yamamoto, left the band. During the year, they released their debut album Mild Weekend.

In 1984, they released their second single, "Hitomi Shoujo", with two new members, Yonekawa and Taguchi. The single was used as a commercial for Rohto Pharmaceutical's Rohto products. The B-side track, "Chili Dog ga Okiniiri", has been used as a commercial for car's brand Mazda Familia. During the year, they released their second album, Boy's Life. Neither of their two singles and albums charted.

=== 1985–1987: Commercial success and Sekiguchi's withdrawal ===
In 1985, the band name changed to the C-C-B with the Watanabe's explanation for ordinary people to find it easier to read and remember them.

After three years of no sales success and with the preparation for themselves to disband, their single "Romantic ga Tomaranai" became their biggest and best-selling single. It was used as a theme song to the Japanese television drama Maido Osawagaseshimasu. The single debuted at number 2 on the Oricon Weekly Single Rankings and remained at number 5 on Yearly Rankings. In the Best Ten rankings, they debuted at number 1 and remained at number 11 on Yearly Rankings. The single was awarded as one of the best songs of the year along with the best arrangement of the year in the 27th Japan Record Awards.

The following single, "School Girl", was not as successful as a previous, the sound reminded of their earlier times and maintained in the top 10 charts. While the single version is performed by drummer Ryu, the album version was renamed with "School Boy" and performed by Sekiguchi. The single debuted at number 6 on Oricon Single Weekly Charts and remained on number 52 on Yearly Charts. In the Best Ten rankings, the single debuted at number 5 and remained in yearly rankings at number 37.

Their third single in the 1985, "Lucky Chance wo Mou Ichido" is also one of their biggest hits. It debuted at number 3 on Oricon Single Weekly Rankings and remained number 50 on Yearly rankings, while in Best Ten Rankings it debuted at number 1 and remained in the yearly rankings at number 13. The song gave the band's first appearance on the end of the year special Kouhaku Uta Gassen. The single won the Best Ballad Song Award at the 1986's FNS Kayousai.

The fourth single of the 1985, "Kuusou Kiss" reprised role to be used as a theme song to the second season of the Japanese television drama Maido Osawagaseshimasu. While the original single version is performed by bassist Watanabe, the album version has a different arrangement and is performed by Sekiguchi. The single debuted at number 3 on Oricon Single Weekly Rankings and remained at number 28 on 1986 Yearly Rankings. In Best Ten rankings, it debuted at number 2 on weekly rankings and remained on number 36 on 1986 Yearly Rankings.

Their first single in 1986, "Genkina Broken Heart", was nominated on Number 4 at the 15th Tokyo Music Festival. The single debuted at number 2 on Oricon Single Weekly Rankings and remained at number 61 on Yearly Rankings. In the Best Ten rankings, it also debuted at number 2 on weekly charts and remained at number 28 on Yearly Charts.

Their following single, "Fushizen na Kimi ga Suki", has the main vocalist Sekiguchi instead of Watanabe or Ryu. It was also the first single to be written by members themselves. The single debuted at number 2 on Oricon Single Weekly Charts and remained at number 80 on the Yearly Charts. In Best Ten rankings, the single debuted at number 3 and remained in yearly charts at number 38. The single has received the Best Song Music Award in the 1986's FNS Music Festival.

In December, the band released "Naimononedari no I Want You" before Sekiguchi's withdrawal from the band and start of his solo career. It was used as a theme song to the regular Japanese television drama series Maido Osawagaseshimasu. The single debuted at number 1 on Oricon Single Weekly Charts, and became their first single which debuted at number 1 on weekly charts. In the yearly 1987 charts it kept on number 65. On Best Ten rankings, it debuted at number 6 on weekly rankings and remained at number 35 on the Yearly Charts.

=== 1987–1989: Sales decline and disbandment ===
On 6 April 1987, Sekiguchi officially left the band and the band started their activities as four-piece band. On 3 June 1987 they released "2 Much, I Love U" which debuted at number 2 on Oricon Single Weekly Charts and remained at number 98 on Yearly Charts. In the Best Ten ranking, it debuted at number 2 and remained on number 84 on yearly charts.

On 23 September 1987, they released "Genshoku Shitaine", which is the second single to be written by themselves. It was used in a Meiji Seika's chocolate commercial for Karukatta Wafer and as theme song to the theatrical animated film Shōri tōshu. The B-side track, "Love is Light', has been used as an insert song to the film as well. The single debuted at number 3 on Oricon Single Weekly Charts. In the Best Ten rankings, the single debuted at number 3 on weekly charts and remained at number 78 on Yearly Charts.

"Dakishimetai" has the Yonekawa in the charge of main vocalist, previously he was only in the charge of back-vocals and main guitar. Released on 2 December 1987, It debuted at number 6 on Oricon Single Weekly Charts and on number 5 on Best Ten Weekly Charts. It is also their last appearance in the Best Ten music television program. It was used as a theme song to the TBS Japanese television series Discovery of the World's Mysteries.

With fewer television appearances and lower positions in the weekly charts, the band has felt their decline in popularity with the following three final singles and change to their music style.

Although the single "Love Letter", which was released in April 1988, debuted at number 3 on Oricon Single Weekly charts, it was not as popular and recognised by the audience and the single "Shinjiteireba" was their final single to debut in Top 10 Single Weekly Charts.

On 21 April 1989, the band has announced the disbandment and four days later released final single, "Love Is Magic" debuting at number 17 on Oricon Single Weekly Charts. On 9 October, the band held the final live performance in the Budokan.

=== 1990–present: Members solo activities ===
After Sekiguchi left the band, he launched his solo activities through major recording label Pony Canon until 1992. During that time, Sekiguchi would write music for several artists including "Futari Shizuka" for Akina Nakamori. Since 2003 until 2023, he is active as a soloist under his own private music label: Luxury Records.

After band disbanded, each member launched their solo career and formed either member part of the independent bands: Ryu launched his solo activities through same recording label as during band times, Polydor Records until 1990 and was in temporal hiatus since 1993 until 1998. Since 1999 until his death in 2022, he continued his solo activities only as independent artist under his own private music label. From the 2010 until 2015, he was regularly invited to and appeared on television shows in which he sometimes performed Romantic ga Tomaranai.

Yonekawa launched his solo career in the 1990s with the vocal-guitar albums and with the following next century released only guitar solo music works. Sometimes, he provided music and participates in the music recordings for artists such as the Yellow Monkey and Eikichi Yazawa.

Watanabe formed various indie bands and was musically active until 2015, when he died.

Since the band disbanded, Taguchi performed as a studio musician and was musically active until 2015, when he was arrested.

=== 1994–2022: Reunion attempts, Taguchi's arrests and member's death ===
In 1994, the band reunited for the first time in a special broadcast of Best Ten.

In 2004, some of the members reunited under the initials Yonetawataru (ヨネタワタル) which would hide the alphabets from their surnames. In 2011, they would change the band name from katakana into kanji initials: AJ-米田渡. In 2005, the single Romantic ga Tomaranai was used as a commercial song to the Asahi Soft Drinks Canned coffee. With the increasing popularity of the song, it was used as a regular song to the television drama series Densha Otoko.

In 2007 the special skit C-C-B Goro was temporarily broadcast to the Japanese variety show SMAPxSMAP with the member Goro Inagaki with the visual copy of Ryu's outfit. On the special broadcast, the three members appeared for this occasion once in the street live to perform Romantic ga Tomaranai. In 2008, the band reunited for the first time in 19 years with three former members - Sekiguchi, Watanabe and Ryu and performed live in the Osaka, Tokyo and Nagoya. The reunion project wrapped up in 2009.

July 2015 was marked as a painful year to the members and fans. On 2 July, Taguchi was arrested for drug possession and on 13 July, Watanabe died at the age of 55 due to multiple organ failure. As the result, the unit project AJ ended. In December 2022, Ryu died at age of 60 due to a cerebral infarction. On the same month, Ryu received posthumously the Special Achievement Award at the 64th Japan Record Awards sponsored by the Japan Composers Association. On 1 August 2024, Taguchi was again arrested over drug possession. 0.585 grams of narcotics was discovered at his Adachi home.

== Members ==
CoConut Boys period

- Tatsuya Yamamoto (山本達也) — guitar, vocal
- Yasufumi Yamashita (山下康文) — guitar, vocal
- Watanabe Hideki (渡辺英樹) — bass, vocal
- Ryu Koji (笠浩二) — drums, vocal
- Sekiguchi Makoto (関口誠人) — guitar, vocal

C-C-B period

- Hideki Watanabe (渡辺英樹, Watanabe Hideki; born 1 February 1960) (1979–2015) – bass, vocal
- Koji Ryu (笠浩二, Ryu Koji; born 8 November 1962) (1982–2022) – drum, vocal
- Makoto Sekiguchi (関口誠人, Sekiguchi Makoto; born 2 May 1959) (1982–present) – guitar, vocal
- Tomoharu Taguchi (田口智治, Taguchi Tomoharu; born 27 October 1960) (1982–present) – keyboard, vocal
- Hideyuki Yonekawa (米川英之, Yonekawa Hideyuki; born 3 March 1964) – guitar, vocal
  - After Makoto's departure in 1987, he replaced his vocal parts in the previous releases.

== Discography ==
As Coconut Boys

=== Singles ===
List of singles
Year	Single	Format	Label
1983	Candy	CD, LP, Cassette	Kids
1984	Hitomi Shojo (瞳少女)	CD, LP, Cassette	Kids

=== Studio albums ===
List of studio albums
Year	Single	Format	Label
1983	Mild Weekend	CD, LP, Cassette	Kids
1984	Boy's Life	CD, LP, Cassette	Kids

As C-C-B

=== Singles ===
List of singles, with selected chart positions
Year	Single	Peak chart positions	Format	Label
Year	Single	JPN Oricon	Format	Label
1985	Romantic ga Tomaranai (Romanticが止まらない)	2	CD, LP, Cassette	Polydor Records
1985	School Girl (スクール・ガール)	8	CD, LP, Cassette	Polydor Records
1985	Lucky Chance wo Mou Ichido (Lucky Chanceをもう一度)	3	CD, LP, Cassette	Polydor Records
1985	Kuusou Kiss (空想Kiss)	3	CD, LP, Cassette	Polydor Records
1986	Genki na Broken Heart (元気なブロークン・ハート)	2	CD, LP, Cassette	Polydor Records
1986	Fushizen na Kimi ga Suki (不自然な君が好き)	2	CD, LP, Cassette	Polydor Records
1986	Naimononedari no I Want You (ないものねだりのI Want You)	1	CD, LP, Cassette	Polydor Records
1987	2 Much, I Love U.	2	CD, LP, Cassette	Polydor Records
1987	Genshoku Shitai ne (原色したいね)	3	CD, LP, Cassette	Polydor Records
1987	Dakishimetai (抱きしめたい)	6	CD, LP, Cassette	Polydor Records
1988	Love Letter (恋文（ラブレター）)	3	CD, LP, Cassette	Polydor Records
1988	Shinjite Ireba (信じていれば)	7	CD, LP, Cassette	Polydor Records
1989	Love is Magic	7	CD, LP, Cassette	Polydor Records
2005	Romantic ga Tomaranai Remix version (Romanticが止まらない)	17	CD	Universal J
2008	Romantic ga Tomaranai (Romanticが止まらない)	—	CD	After Time Records

=== Studio albums ===
List of studio albums
Release	Single	Format	Label
25 May 1985	Suteki na Beat (すてきなビート)	CD, LP, Cassette, digital download	Polydor Records
15 December 1985	Bokutachi No-No-No (僕たちNo-No-No)	CD, LP, Cassette, digital download	Polydor Records
18 June 1986	Bouken no Susume (冒険のススメ)	CD, LP, Cassette, digital download	Polydor Records
15 December 1986	Ai no Chikara Kobu (冒愛の力こぶ)	CD, LP, Cassette, digital download	Polydor Records
25 July 1987	Ishi wa Yappari Katai (石はやっぱりカタイ)	CD, LP, Cassette, digital download	Polydor Records
25 May 1988	Hashire☆Bandman (走れ☆バンドマン)	CD, LP, Cassette, digital download	Polydor Records
15 December 1988	Shinjiteireba (信じていれば)	CD, LP, Cassette, digital download	Polydor Records

=== Live albums ===
List of live albums
Release	Single	Format	Label
4 July 2014	C-C-B 1989 Kaisan Live@Nippon Budoukan (C-C-B 1989 解散ライブ@日本武道館)	CD	USM Japan

=== Compilation albums ===
List of compilation albums
Release	Single	Format	Label
25 June 1985	Tanoshii Natsuyasumi (楽しい夏休み)	CD, Cassette tape	Polydor Records
25 March 1987	MAX-MEGA-MIX	CD, Cassette tape	Polydor Records
1 June 1989	The Best of C-C-B Vol.1	CD, Cassette tape	Polydor Records
1 September 1989	The Best of C-C-B Vol.2	CD, Cassette tape	Polydor Records
25 January 1992	C-C-B Super Best	CD, Cassette tape	Polydor Records
1 November 1993	Best 2500/Romantic ga Tomaranai (ベスト2500/Romanticが止まらない)	CD	Polydor Records
26 October 1994	SINGLE COLLECTION	CD	Polydor Records
21 November 1996	Special 1800 (スペシャル1800)	CD	Polydor Records
30 June 1999	Treasure Collection	CD	Polydor Records
19 December 2001	Super Value C-C-B (スーパー・バリュー/C-C-B)	CD	Polydor Records
26 November 2003	GOLDEN☆BEST C-C-B	CD	USM Japan
18 January 2006	Prime Selection C-C-B (プライム・セレクション C-C-B)	CD	USM Japan
30 August 2006	Uta ga Utaitai！Best Hit&Karaoke C-C-B (歌が唄いたい！！ベストヒット&カラオケ C-C-B)	CD	USM Japan
22 August 2007	Essential Best C-C-B (エッセンシャル・ベスト C-C-B)	CD	USM Japan
4 June 2014	C-C-B Single&Album Best (C-C-B シングル&アルバム・ベスト)	CD	USM Japan
21 March 2018	Essential Best 1200 C-C-B (エッセンシャル・ベスト 1200 C-C-B)	CD	USM Japan
21 March 2023	C-C-B THE SINGLE COLLECTION	CD	USM Japan

== Videography ==
List of compilation video albums
Release	Single	Format	Label
25 November 1985	Adventure of C-C-B no Bouken (Adventure of C-C-B C-C-Bの大冒険)	VHS, LD, Betamax	Polydor Records
5 July 1986	C-C-B Live (C-C-B LIVE晴)	VHS, LD, Betamax	Polydor Records
25 May 1987	C-C-B LIVE TOUCH AND GO!	VHS, LD, Betamax	Polydor Records
1 September 1989	C-C-B VIDEO CLIP COLLECTION	VHS, LD, Betamax	Polydor Records
25 November 1989	C-C-B FINAL CONCERT TOUCH DOWN vol.1 / vol.2	VHS, LD, Betamax	Polydor Records
29 September 2004	C-C-B Memorial DVD Box (C-C-B メモリアル DVD BOX)	DVD	USM Japan

== Authority ==
Musicbrainz.org page ISNI
