= HoneyWorks =

Japanese musical group

- Origin: Japan
- Genres: J-pop; Pop rock; Anime song
- Years active: 2010–present
- Label: MusicRay'n (2014–present)
- Members: Gom; shito; Yamako
- Website: honeyworks.jp

HoneyWorks is a Japanese musical group consisting of songwriters Gom and shito, and illustrator Yamako. The group started uploading original Vocaloid songs to NicoNico in 2010, and released their debut album under label MusicRay'n in 2014. Since their inception, they have collaborated with a wide range of vocalists. In 2014, HoneyWorks partnered with singer CHiCO to form the unit CHiCO with HoneyWorks.

They are the creators of the Kokuhaku Jikkō Iinkai: Ren'ai Series multimedia project.

== Members ==
=== Main ===
- Gom (composer)
- shito (composer)
- Yamako (illustrator)

=== Supporting ===
- Oji (guitar, joined in 2012)
- ziro (staff, joined in 2014)
- Keiki Uto/cake (宇都圭輝) (keyboard, joined in 2014)
- AtsuyuK! (drum, joined in 2014)
- Mogelatte (モゲラッタ) (Illustrator and video editor, joined in 2014)
- Nakanishi (中西) (guitar, 2017)
- kyo (guitar)
- Leon Yuuki (裕木レオン) (drum)
- Keoru (composer)
- Hanon (vocals)
- Kotoha (vocals)
- halyosy (vocals)

==== Former ====
- Rocoru (ろこる) (illustrator, 2013–2019)
- Mario Komiya (コミヤマリオ) (composer and business assistant)

== Television ==
HoneyWorks' songs have been featured as an opening/ending song in the following anime television shows:

=== Openings ===
- 2014: "Sekai wa Koi ni Ochiteiru" for Blue Spring Ride
- 2015: "Ai No Scenario" for Magic Kaito 1412 (Episodes #13 to 24)
- 2015: "Pride Kakumei" for Gintama
- 2017: "Twins" for PriPri Chi-chan!!
- 2017: "Kyou Mo Sakura Mau Akatsuki Ni" for Gintama
- 2018: "Nostalgic Rainfall" for After the Rain
- 2019: "Otome-domo Yo" for O Maidens in Your Savage Season
- 2021: "Minikui Ikimono" for Otherside Picnic
- 2021: "Gamushara" for Boruto: Naruto Next Generations (Episode #206 onwards)
- 2022: "Himitsu Koigokoro" for Rent-A-Girlfriend
- 2024: "Kirakira" for 365 Days to the Wedding
- 2025: "Shitsumon, Koi tte Nan deshou ka? for Can a Boy-Girl Friendship Survive?
- 2025: "Kanojo wa Ima, Meikyuu no Naka" for The Mononoke Lecture Logs of Chuzenji-sensei: He Just Solves All the Mysteries
- 2025: "Senjou no Hana" for May I Ask for One Final Thing?
- 2025: "Zettai Shousan!" for A Mangaka's Weirdly Wonderful Workplace
- 2025: "Kusuguttai" for With You, Our Love Will Make It Through
- 2026: "I Love You" for You Can't Be In a Rom-Com with Your Childhood Friends!
- 2026: "Kimi ga Tomoshite Kureta Hikari wo Ima" for An Adventurer's Daily Grind at Age 29
- 2026: "Sekai Tsunagare" for Pokémon (2023)

=== Endings ===
- 2018: "Hikari Shoumeiron" for Gintama
- 2020: "Kessen Spirit" for Haikyū!! To The Top
- 2021: "Bōken no Vlog (A Vlog of the Journey)" for Edens Zero (Episodes #2 to 12)
- 2022: "Bibitto Love" for Science Fell in Love, So I Tried to Prove It
- 2024: "Kawaikute Gomen" for Alya Sometimes Hides Her Feelings in Russian
- 2025: "NinKoro Dance" feat. HaKoniwalily, for A Ninja and an Assassin Under One Roof.
- 2026: "Kimi no Tonari wa Kuuki ga Oishii" for An Adventurer's Daily Grind at Age 29

Also, a TV anime Itsu Datte Bokura no Koi wa 10 senchi Datta (Our Love Has Always Been 10 Centimeters Apart) that featured HoneyWorks' story and songs started its 6-week program on November 24, 2017.

== Movies ==
HoneyWorks songs have been featured as an opening/ending/insert song in the following movies:

- "Tsunoru Kimochi" for Principal ~Koi Suru Watashi wa Heroine desu ka?~
- "Principal No Kimi E" for Principal ~Koi Suru Watashi wa Heroine desu ka?~
- "Oni no Mori" for Jukai Mura
- "Watashi wa, watashi no koto ga suki" for Cosmic Princess Kaguya

HoneyWorks songs have been the inspiration for two movies, Zutto Mae Kara Suki Deshita and Suki ni Naru Sono Shunkan o. Both heavily incorporate the band's songs.

== Discography ==
=== Albums ===
Title	Album details	Peak chart positions
Title	Album details	JPN
初恋ノート (Hatsukoi Note)	Released: November 19, 2011	—
六弦アストロジー (Six-String Astrology)	Released: April 27, 2013	—
ずっと前から好きでした。 (I Have Always Liked You.)	Released: January 26, 2014	4
僕じゃダメですか？〜「告白実行委員会」キャラクターソング集〜 (Am I No Good? ~Confess Your Love Committee Character Song Collection~)	Released: November 26, 2014	4
ボカコレ3 (VocaColle 3)	Released: May 25, 2015	—
好きになるその瞬間を。 (The Moment You Fall in Love.)	Released: July 15, 2015	4
何度だって、好き。~告白実行委員会~ (No Matter How Many Times, I Like You. ~Confess Your Love Committee~)	Released: February 22, 2017	4
好きすぎてやばい。〜告白実行委員会キャラクターソング集〜 (I Like You So Much, It's Bad. ~Confess Your Love Committee Character Song Collection~)	Released: January 15, 2020	5
ねえ、好きっていいなよ。 〜告白実行委員会キャラクターソング集〜 (Hey, I Want to Say I Like You. ~Confess Your Love Committee Character Song Collection~)	Released: March 15, 2023	5
HoneyWorks ～告白実行委員会コンプリートベスト～ 思い出は全部青春。	Released: January 29, 2025	10
フローライト (Fluorite) (featuring HaKoniwaLily)	Released: March 11, 2026	19

=== Chico with HoneyWorks ===
==== Albums ====
	Title	Release date
1	世界はiに満ちている (Sekai wa i ni Michiteiru)	November 18, 2015
2	私を染めるiの歌 (Watashi wo Someru i no Uta)	February 28, 2018
3	瞬く世界に i を揺らせ (Matataku Sekai ni i wo Yurase)	September 16, 2020

==== Singles ====
	Single	Track listing	Release date
1	世界は恋に落ちている (The World is Falling in Love)	4 songs: 1. 世界は恋に落ちている (The World is Falling in Love); 2. color 3. 世界は恋に落ちている -instrumental-; 4. color -instrumental-	6 August 2014
2	アイのシナリオ (Ai No Scenario)	4 songs: 1. アイのシナリオ (Ai No Scenario); 2. ユキドケ; 3. アイのシナリオ (Ai No Scenario) -instrumental-; 4. ユキドケ -instrumental-	4 February 2015
3	プライド革命 (Pride Revolution)	4 songs: 1. プライド革命 (Pride Revolution); 2. ヒストリア (Historia); 3. プライド革命 (Pride Revolution) -instrumental-; 4. ヒストリア (Historia) -instrumental-	5 August 2015
4	恋色に咲け (Koiiro no Sake)	4 songs: 1. 恋色に咲け (Koiiro no Sake); 2. これ青春アンダースタンド feat.sana 3. 恋色に咲け (Koiiro no Sake) -instrumental-; 4. これ青春アンダースタンド feat.sana -instrumental-	13 April 2016
5	カヌレとウルフ (Canele and Wolf)	4 songs: 1. カヌレ (Canele); 2. ウルフ (Wolf); 3. カヌレ (Canele)-instrumental-; 4. ウルフ (Wolf) -instrumental-	14 September 2016
6	今日もサクラ舞う暁に (Kyou mo Sakura Mau Akatsuki Ni)	4 songs: 1. 今日もサクラ舞う暁に (Kyou mo Sakura Mau Akatsuki Ni); 2. ロデオ (Rodeo) feat.sana 3. 今日もサクラ舞う暁に (Kyou mo Sakura Mau Akatsuki Ni) -instrumental-; 4. ロデオ (Rodeo) feat.sana -instrumental-	26 April 2017
7	ツインズ (Twins)	4 songs: 1. ツインズ (Twins); 2. ラブホイッスル (Love Whistle); 3. ツインズ (Twins) -instrumental-; 4. ラブホイッスル (Love Whistle) -instrumental-	9 August 2017
8	ノスタルジックレインフォール (Nostalgic Rainfall)	4 songs: 1. ノスタルジックレインフォール (Nostalgic Rainfall); 2. ラズベリー＊モンスター (Raspberry＊Monster); 3. ツノスタルジックレインフォール (Nostalgic Rainfall) -instrumental-; 4. ラズベリー＊モンスター (Raspberry＊Monster) -instrumental-	24 January 2018
9	ヒカリ証明論 (Hikari Shoumeiron)	4 songs: 1. ヒカリ証明論 (Hikari Shoumeiron); 2. サイダ (Cider); 3. ヒカリ証明論 (Hikari Shoumeiron) -instrumental-; 4. サイダ (Cider) -instrumental-	8 August 2018
10	ミスター・ダーリン / ギミギミコール (Mister・Darling / Gimme Gimme Call)	4 songs: 1. ミスター・ダーリン (Mister・Darling); 2. ギミギミコール (Gimme Gimme Call); 3. ミスター・ダーリン (Mister・Darling) -instrumental- (feat. Shoko Nakagawa ver.); 4. ギミギミコール (Gimme Gimme Call) -instrumental- (feat. Sky Piece ver.)	7 November 2018
11	乙女どもよ。 (Otome-domo yo.)	4 songs: 1. 乙女どもよ。 (Otome-domo yo.); 2. 恋人ツナギ (Koibito Tsunagi); 3. 乙女どもよ。 (Otome-domo yo.) -instrumental-; 4. 恋人ツナギ (Koibito Tsunagi) -instrumental-	7 August 2019
12	決戦スピリット (Kessen Spirit)	4 songs: 1. 決戦スピリット (Kessen Spirit); 2. BGM; 3. 決戦スピリット (Kessen Spirit) -TV size-; 4. BGM -instrumental-	26 February 2020
