= D404ME =

Studio album by Akina Nakamori
- Released: 10 August 1985
- Recorded: 1985
- Genre: J-pop; kayōkyoku
- Length: 43:09
- Language: Japanese
- Label: Warner Pioneer

Akina Nakamori chronology
Bitter and Sweet (1985)	D404ME (1985)	Best (1986)

Singles from D404ME
- 1. "Meu amor é..." Released: 8 March 1985

D404ME (ディー・よんぜろよん・エムイー, Dī Yon Zero Yon Emu Ī) is the eighth studio album by Japanese singer Akina Nakamori. It was released on 10 August 1985 under the Warner Pioneer label. The album includes renewed version of the smash hit "Meu amor é...".

== Background ==
D404ME is the second studio album released in 1985, four months after her previous studio album Bitter and Sweet. The initial number and letters from the album means "Dashi Oshimi" (出し惜しみ, lit. "Unwilling").

The music production team consist a various big hit makers during 80's period such as Aska from duo Chage and Aska, Joe Hisaishi, Takashi Tsushimi, Kiyoshiro Imawano from rock band RC Succession, Taeko Ohnuki or Tsugutoshi Gotō.

In the earlier editions of newsletter from Nakamori's fanclub Milkyway, was included prototype version of lyrics of "Nocturne" and "Blue Ocean".

== Promotion ==
=== Single ===
It consists of one previously released single, "Meu amor é..." The single has received the highest claimed musical award in the 27th Japan Record Awards in 1985. The album version has subtitle New Re-mix version and includes renewed arrangement. The intro begins with the sound of acoustic instruments, while the original version starts with the heavy orchestral instrumentation. The original version of Mi Amore was included in the second compilation album "Best" in 1986.

Following studio albums for four years doesn't include any promotion single, instead they include completely new recorded album tracks.

== Stage performances ==
Endless, Allegro Vivace, Nocturne, Mona Lisa and Blue Ocean were performed in Nakamori's live tour Light and Shade in 1986. As of 2023, it doesn't exist a live footage neither it was broadcast in the TV.

None of the original album tracks (aside of original version of Mi Amore) hasn't been performed in the television music programs.

== Chart performance ==
The album reached number 1 on the Oricon Album Weekly Charts. LP Record version charted 28 weeks, Cassette tape version debuted on number 1 as well and charted 36 weeks and sold over 651,100 copies. The album remained at number 7 on the Oricon Album Yearly Charts in 1985. As result, in the December 1985 it was nominated in 27th Japan Record Awards and won title The Album of the Year.

== Track listing ==
No.	Title	Lyrics	Music	Arranger(s)	Length
1.	"Endless"	Ikki Matsumoto	Taeko Ohnuki	Akira Inoue	4:23
2.	"Nocturne"	Aska	Aska	AKAGUY	4:21
3.	"Allegro Vivace"	Yoshiko Miura	Tsugutoshi Gotō	Gotō	5:02
4.	"Kanashii Romance"	Eiko Kyo	Takashi Tsushimi	Satoshi Nakamura	4:15
5.	"Pierce"	Fumiko Okada	Yukihide Takekawa	Nakamura	4:02
6.	"Blue Ocean"	Reiko Yukawa	Nobody	Joe Hisaishi	4:01
7.	"Magnetic Love"	Epo	Ohnuki	Nobuyuki Shimizu	3:38
8.	"Star Pilot"	Tetsuya Chiaki	Kiyoshiro Imawano	Gotō	4:04
9.	"Monalisa"	Ichiko Takehana	Gotō	Gotō	5:18
10.	"Meu amor é... (New Remix Version)"	Chinfa Kan	Naoya Matsuoka	Matsuoka	4:18

2023 remaster issue
No.	Title	Lyrics	Music	Arranger(s)	Length
11.	"Meu amor é... (Single Version)"	Chinfa Kan	Naoya Matsuoka	Matsuoka	3:53
12.	"Lonely Journey"	Epo	Epo	Nobuyuki Shimizu	4:54

Notes:

- "Endless," "Blue Ocean" and "Star Pilot" are stylised in all uppercase.

== Covers ==
=== Meu amor é ===
- Naoya Matsuoka, original composed of the song released instrumental cover in 1985 album ONE LAST FAREWELL〜Naoya Matsuoka best selection. The song was reprised as a bonus track on the compilation album "Venus wo Sagase" in 1994.
- Nana Katase covered song as her fifth single, released on March 10, 2004, by Avex Trax as the lead single from her second album Extended.
- Karyudo covered the song as single released in 1996.

=== Sky Pilot ===
- Japanese singer from rock band RC Succession, Kiyoshiro Imawano covered Star Pilot under different title "Sky Pilot" and was released as a single on 21 November 1995.

=== Mona Lisa ===
- Japanese idol-singer, Miho Nakayama covered "Mona Lisa" in her first live tour Virgin Flight in 1986.

== Release history ==
Year	Format(s)	Serial number	Label(s)	Ref.
1985	LP, CT, CD	L-12594, LKF-8094, 32XL-115	Warner Pioneer	
1991	CD	WPCL-418	Warner Pioneer	
1996	CD	WPC6-8189	Warner Pioneer	
2006	CD, digital download	WPCL-10284	Warner Pioneer	
2012	Super Audio CD, CD hybrid	WPCL-11142	Warner Pioneer	
2014	CD	WPCL-11729	Warner Pioneer	
2018	LP	WPJL-10096	Warner Pioneer	
2023	2CD	WPCL-13451/2	Warner Pioneer	

Notes:

- 2006 re-release includes 24-bit digitally remastered sound source
- 2012 and 2014 re-release includes subtitles in the tracks "2012 remaster"
- 2023 re-release includes lacquer remaster which includes subtitles in the tracks "2023 lacquer remaster" along with original karaoke version of the tracks

== See also ==
- 1985 in Japanese music
