= Hideaki Tokunaga discography =

- Studio albums: 18
- Live albums: 3
- Compilation albums: 16
- Singles: 55
- Video albums: 29 (Note: This includes the music video compilation albums and concert DVDs.)
- Cover albums: 7
- Box sets: 9

The discography of the Japanese singer/songwriter Hideaki Tokunaga consists of eighteen studio albums, sixteen compilation albums, and fifty five singles released since 1986.

== Albums ==
=== Studio albums ===
Year	Information	Oricon weekly peak position	Sales	RIAJ certification
1986	Girl: Released: January 21, 1986; Label: Apollon; Formats: LP, CD, cassette	—		
1986	Radio: Released: August 21, 1986; Label: Apollon; Formats: LP, CD, cassette	—		
1987	Birds: Released: May 21, 1987; Label: Apollon; Formats: LP, CD, cassette	1		
1988	Dear: Released: April 21, 1988; Label: Apollon; Formats: LP, CD, cassette	2	188,000	
1989	Realize: Released: May 21, 1989; Label: Apollon; Formats: CD, cassette	4	266,000	Gold
1990	Justice: Released: October 9, 1990; Label: Apollon; Formats: CD, cassette	1	413,000	Platinum
1991	Revolution: Released: October 5, 1991; Label: Apollon; Formats: CD, cassette	1	478,000	Platinum
1993	Nostalgia: Released: December 10, 1993; Label: Apollon; Formats: CD, cassette	3	438,000	Platinum
1995	Taiyō no Shōnen: Released: December 8, 1995; Label: Universal Music Japan; Formats: CD, cassette	8	185,000	
1997	Bless: Released: February 26, 1997; Label: Universal Music Japan; Formats: CD, cassette	4	125,000	
1998	Honesto: Released: June 2, 1999; Label: King Records; Formats: CD	8	126,000	
2000	Remind: Released: May 24, 2000; Label: King Records; Formats: CD	13	54,000	
2003	Ai wo Kudasai: Released: February 27, 2003; Label: Universal Music Japan; Formats: CD	17	37,000	
2004	My Life: Released: September 29, 2004; Label: Universal Music Japan; Formats: CD	25	20,000	
2009	We All: Released: May 6, 2009; Label: Universal Sigma; Formats: CD	1		
2013	Statement: Released: July 17, 2013; Label: Universal Sigma; Formats: CD, digital	4		
2017	Baton: Released: July 19, 2017; Label: Universal Sigma; Formats: CD, digital	8		
2021	Love Person: Released: June 2, 2021; Label: Universal Sigma; Formats: CD, digital	3		

=== Cover albums ===
Year	Information	Oricon weekly peak position	Sales	RIAJ certification
2005	Vocalist: Released: September 14, 2005; Label: Universal Sigma; Formats: CD	5	1,000,000	Million
2006	Vocalist 2: Released: August 30, 2006; Label: Universal Sigma; Formats: CD	3	294,000	2× Platinum
2007	Vocalist 3: Released: August 15, 2007; Label: Universal Sigma; Formats: CD	1	1,000,000	Million
2010	Vocalist 4: Released: April 20, 2010; Label: Universal Sigma; Formats: CD	1		2× Platinum
2012	Vocalist Vintage: Released: May 30, 2012; Label: Universal Sigma; Formats: CD	3		Gold
2015	Vocalist 6: Released: January 21, 2015; Label: Universal Sigma; Formats: CD	3		Gold
2026	Covers: Released: January 21, 2026; Label: Nippon Columbia; Formats: CD	13	7,723	

=== Live albums ===
Year	Information	Oricon weekly peak position	Sales	RIAJ certification
1990	Hideaki Tokunaga Live: Released: July 1, 1990; Label: Apollon; Formats: CD, cassette	6	115,000	
1994	Live 1994: Released: September 14, 1994; Label: Apollon; Formats: CD, cassette	5	124,000	
2014	Statement Tour Final at Nagoya Century Hall: Released: September 3, 2014; Label: Universal Sigma; Formats: CD, digital	8		
2016	Concert Tour 2015 Vocalist & Songs 3 Final at Orix Theater: Released: June 8, 2016; Label: Universal Sigma; Formats: CD, digital	13		

=== Compilations ===
Year	Information	Oricon weekly peak position	Sales	RIAJ certification
1987	Intro.: Released: December 5, 1987; Label: Apollon; Formats: LP, CD, cassette	6	135,000	
1992	Intro.II: Released: December 4, 1992; Label: Apollon; Formats: CD, cassette	2	667,000	Platinum
1997	Ballade of Ballade: Released: November 1, 1997; Label: Bandai Music Entertainment; Formats: CD	3	330,000	Gold
1998	Single Collection (1986–1991): Released: November 21, 1998; Label: Universal Music Japan; Formats: CD	19	45,000	Gold
1998	Single Collection (1992–1997): Released: November 21, 1998; Label: Universal Music Japan; Formats: CD	27	21,000	
2001	Intro.III: Released: February 28, 2001; Label: King Records; Formats: CD	17	40,000	
2003	Self-Cover Best: Kagayaki Nagara: Released: October 1, 2003; Label: Universal Sigma; Formats: CD	16	40,000	
2006	Beautiful Ballade: Released: February 22, 2006; Label: Universal Sigma; Formats: CD	8	108,000	Gold
2008	Singles Best: Released: August 13, 2008; Label: Universal Sigma; Formats: CD	—		
2008	Singles B-side Best: Released: August 13, 2008; Label: Universal Sigma; Formats: CD	—		
2011	Vocalist & Ballade Best: Released: April 27, 2011; Label: Universal Sigma; Formats: CD, digital	2		Platinum
2016	All Time Best Presence: Released: April 13, 2016; Label: Universal Sigma; Formats: CD, digital	5		
2016	All Time Best Vocalist: Released: August 17, 2016; Label: Universal Sigma; Formats: CD, digital	2		
2018	Eien no Hate ni ~ Self-Cover Best I: Released: July 4, 2018; Label: Universal Sigma; Formats: CD, digital	7		
2019	Taiyo Gai Ippai Plein Soleil ~ Self-Cover Best II: Released: July 3, 2019; Label: Universal Sigma; Formats: CD, digital	9		

=== Box sets ===
Year	Information
2001	Ichigo Ichie: Hideaki Tokunaga 15th Anniversary Special Memorial Box: Released: December 5, 2001; Label: Universal Sigma; Formats: CD
2002	Presence 1986-1998 Complete Box: Released: November 20, 2002; Label: Universal Sigma; Formats: CD
2002	Hideaki Tokunaga Live and Clips ~Sakana-tachi no Kiroku~: Released: November 20, 2002; Label: Universal Sigma; Formats: CD
2008	Vocalist Box: Released: April 9, 2008; Label: Universal Sigma; Formats: CD
2009	Singles Best Box: Released: February 25, 2009; Label: Universal Sigma; Formats: CD
2010	2009 Live Special Edition: Released: March 31, 2010; Label: Universal Sigma; Formats: CD
2010	20th Anniversary Premium Box DVD: Released: December 29, 2010; Label: Universal Sigma; Formats: DVD
2010	20th Anniversary Premium Box Singles: Released: December 29, 2010; Label: Universal Sigma; Formats: CD
2016	All Time Best Presence: Released: April 13, 2016; Label: Universal Sigma; Formats: CD

== Singles ==
List of singles, with selected chart positions
Title	Date	Peak chart positions	Sales (JPN)	RIAJ certification	Album
Title	Date	Oricon Singles Charts	Sales (JPN)	RIAJ certification	Album
"Rainy Blue"	January 21, 1986	90	4,000		Girl
"Natsu no Radio"	May 21, 1986	—			Radio
"Birds"	May 21, 1987	—			Birds
"Kagayaki Nagara..."	July 5, 1987	4	286,000		Birds
"Kaze no Eolia"	February 24, 1988	4	163,000		Dear
"Saigo no Iiwake"	October 25, 1988	4	233,000		Realize
"Koibito"	April 21, 1989	8	141,000		Realize
"Myself -Kaze ni Naritai-" / "Kokoro no Ball"	September 21, 1989	8	80,000		Realize
"Yume wo Shinjite"	January 16, 1990	3	397,000	Platinum	Intro.II
"Kowarekake no Radio"	July 7, 1990	5	366,000	Gold	Justice
"Wednesday Moon"	April 10, 1991	1	226,000	Gold	Revolution
"Love Is All"	September 5, 1991	3	354,000	Gold	Revolution
"Revolution"	October 28, 1991	23	53,000		Revolution
"Koi no Yukue"	April 21, 1992	4	190,000	Gold	Intro.II
"I Love You"	November 2, 1992	7	310,000	Gold	Intro.II
"Mōichido ano Hi no Yō ni"	May 10, 1993	6	215,000	Gold	Nostalgia
"Friends"	August 23, 1993	5	210,000	Gold	Nostalgia
"Boku no Soba ni"	November 1, 1993	4	313,000	Gold	Nostalgia
"Eien no Hate ni"	November 9, 1994	4	274,000	Gold	Taiyō no Shōnen
"Mirai Hikō"	November 1, 1995	13	163,000	Gold	Taiyō no Shōnen
"Rough Diamond"	July 21, 1996	15	99,000		Bless
"Smile"	November 25, 1996	20	59,000		Bless
"Chikai"	January 21, 1997	15	98,000		Bless
"Jōnetsu"	July 16, 1997	—			Bless
"Rainy Blue ~1997 Track~"	November 1, 1997	—			Ballade of Ballade
"Aoi Chigiri"	January 27, 1999	14	125,000		Honesto
"Boku no Ballade"	April 28, 1999	19	48,000		Honesto
"Tsuioku" / "Koigokoro"	February 2, 2000	30	25,000		Remind
"Orion no Honoo"	April 26, 2000	26	24,000		Remind
"Tane"	November 22, 2000	34	16,000		Intro.III
"Call"	January 31, 2001	29	21,000		Intro.III
"Kimi wo Tsurete"	January 21, 2003	14	18,000		Ai wo Kudasai
"Kimi wa Kimi de Itai no ni" / "Kowarekake no Radio"	October 1, 2003	16	9,000		Self-Cover Best ~Kagayaki Nagara~
"My Life"	September 1, 2004	14	17,000		My Life
"Jidai"	August 31, 2005	28	9,000		Vocalist
"Sayonara no Wake" / "Boku ni Dekirukoto"	February 1, 2006	30	9,000		Beautiful Ballade
"Koi wo Shiteyukō"	June 28, 2006	20	11,000		Singles Best
"Yuki no Hana"	July 26, 2006	35	8,000		Vocalist 2
"Happiness"	October 4, 2006	10	10,000		Singles Best
"Koi no Ochite -Fall in Love-"	July 2, 2007	18	6,000		Vocalist 3
"Dakishimete Ageru" / "Hanataba"	April 9, 2008	6			Singles Best / We All
"Ai ga Kanashii kara"	July 16, 2008	10			Singles Best
"Chiisana Inori -P.S. I Love You"	October 8, 2008	11			We All
"Sunadokei"	April 8, 2009	6			We All
"Hello"	August 19, 2009	17			Non-album single
"Toki no Nagare ni Mi wo Makase"	March 31, 2010	11			Vocalist 4
"Haru no Yuki"	January 19, 2011	7			Non-album single
"Tasogare wo Tomete"	April 13, 2011	8			Vocalist & Ballade Best
"Ashita e Kaerō"	August 3, 2011	12			Non-album single
"Ningyō no Ie" / "Yume wa Yoru Hiraku"	May 9, 2012	20			Vocalist Vintage
"Namae no Nai Kono Ai no Tame ni" / "Hibiki"	November 21, 2012	19			Statement
"Statement" / "Anata ni Aete Yokata"	June 5, 2013	18			Statement
"Sayonara no Mukōgawa"	September 24, 2014	8			Vocalist 6
"Kimi ga Kurerumono"	March 9, 2016	14			All Time Best Presence
"Baton"	June 28, 2017	23			Baton
"—" denotes releases that did not chart.
