= Gradation (album) =

Compilation album by Shizuka Kudo
- Released: November 30, 1988
- Recorded: 1987–88
- Genre: Pop
- Length: 46:31
- Label: Pony Canyon

Shizuka Kudo chronology
Shizuka (1988)	Gradation (1988)	Joy (1989)

Gradation is the first compilation album by Japanese singer Shizuka Kudo. It was released on November 30, 1988, through Pony Canyon. The album includes all five singles released by Kudo at the time, from "Kindan no Telepathy" through "Mugon... Iroppoi", their coupling songs, as well as one new song, entitled "X'mas ga Ippai", recorded specifically for the compilation. Gradation was re-released in gold CD format on March 21, 1989.

== Commercial performance ==
Gradation debuted at number two on the Oricon Albums Chart, with 182,000 units sold. The album spent fourteen weeks in the top twenty, of which nine were spent in the top ten. It charted in the top 100 for twenty-one weeks, logging a reported total sales of 600,000 copies during its chart run, making Gradation Kudo's best-selling album. The compilation ranked at number nine on the year-end Oricon Albums Chart for the year 1989, marking her first and only entry into the year-end top ten.

== Track listing ==
All tracks composed and arranged by Tsugutoshi Gotō.

No.	Title	Lyrics	Length
1.	"Mugon... Iroppoi"	Miyuki Nakajima	3:55
2.	"Gunshū" (群衆, "Crowd")	Nakajima	4:30
3.	"Fu-ji-tsu"	Nakajima	3:48
4.	"Natsu ga Kureta Miracle" (夏がくれたミラクル, Natsu ga Kureta Mirakuru, "A Summer Miracle")	Gorō Matsui	3:57
5.	"Daite Kuretara Ii no ni"	Matsui	5:07
6.	"Yoake ni Miokurarete" (夜明けに見送られて, "Seen Off by the Daybreak")	Yasushi Akimoto	4:32
7.	"Again"	Akimoto	4:16
8.	"If" (Remix Version)	Yoshiko Miura	3:47
9.	"Kindan no Telepathy" (Remix Version)	Akimoto	3:47
10.	"Ai ga itai Yoru" (愛が痛い夜, "Nights When Love Hurts")	Akimoto	4:06
11.	"X'mas ga Ippai" (X'masがいっぱい, "Plenty of X'mas")	Matsui	4:46
Total length:			46:31

== Charts ==
=== Standard edition ===
Chart (1988–89)	Peak position	Sales
Japan Weekly Albums (Oricon)	2	600,000
Japan Yearly Albums (Oricon)	9	600,000

=== Re-issue edition ===
Chart (1989)	Peak position	Sales
Japan Weekly Albums (Oricon)	72	5,000

== Release history ==
Region	Date	Format(s)	Label	Ref.
Japan	November 30, 1988	Vinyl; CD; cassette	Pony Canyon	
Japan	March 21, 1989	Gold CD	Pony Canyon	
Various	March 9, 2016	Digital download	Pony Canyon	

== See also ==
- 1988 in Japanese music
