= Harvest (Shizuka Kudo album) =

Compilation album by Shizuka Kudo
- Released: December 6, 1989
- Recorded: 1988–89
- Genre: Pop
- Length: 45:43
- Label: Pony Canyon

Shizuka Kudo chronology
Karelia (1989)	Harvest (1989)	Rosette (1990)

Harvest (stylized as HARVEST) is the second compilation album by Japanese singer Shizuka Kudo. It was released on December 6, 1989, through Pony Canyon, merely two months after the release of the album Karelia. Harvest features the singles "Koi Hitoyo", "Arashi no Sugao" and "Kōsa ni Fukarete", their B-sides, a few select tracks from Kudo's three studio albums released at the time, Mysterious, Shizuka and Joy, as well as a new song recorded and co-written by Kudo for the album.

== Commercial performance ==
Harvest debuted at number two on the Oricon Albums Chart, with 144,000 units sold. It dropped three positions to number five the following week, with sales of 55,000 copies. It slid next to number six, where it stayed for two consecutive weeks, selling 39,000 and 65,000 copies, respectively. The album spent three more weeks inside the top ten and dropped out of the top twenty on its eleventh charting week. Harvest charted in the top 100 for twenty straight weeks, selling a reported total of 419,000 copies during its run. It ranked at number 23 on the year-end Oricon Albums Chart for the year 1990.

== Track listing ==
All tracks composed and arranged by Tsugutoshi Gotō.

No.	Title	Lyrics	Length
1.	"Kōsa ni Fukarete"	Miyuki Nakajima	3:49
2.	"Akiko" (秋子)	Nakajima	3:56
3.	"Arashi no Sugao"	Yoshiko Miura	3:30
4.	"Eien no Bōhatei" (永遠の防波堤, "The Mole of Eternity")	Keiko Asō	4:27
5.	"Koi Hitoyo"	Gorō Matsui	4:31
6.	"Non-Stop"	Matsui	3:52
7.	"Mysterious" (ミステリアス, Misuteriasu)	Miura	4:56
8.	"Passage" (パッセージ, Passēji)	Miura	4:16
9.	"Shōko o Misete" (証拠をみせて, "Show Me Proof")	Nakajima	4:35
10.	"Kiseki no Shōzō" (奇跡の肖像, "Miraculous Portrait")	Masami Tozawa	3:30
11.	"Itsumademo Futari de..." (いつまでも 二人で…, "Always, Together...")	Aeri	4:21
Total length:			45:43

== Charts ==
Chart (1989–90)	Peak position
Japan Weekly Albums (Oricon)	2
Japan Yearly Albums (Oricon)	23

== Certification ==
Region	Certification	Certified units/sales
Japan (RIAJ)	Platinum	400,000^{^}
^{^} Shipments figures based on certification alone.

== Release history ==
Region	Date	Format(s)	Label	Ref.
Japan	December 6, 1989	CD; cassette	Pony Canyon	
Various	November 7, 2012	Digital download	Pony Canyon	

== See also ==
- 1989 in Japanese music
