= 1989 in Japanese music =

In 1989 (Shōwa 64 / Heisei 1), Japanese music was released on records, and there were charts, awards, contests and festivals.

During that year, Japan continued to have the second largest music market in the world, and fourteen percent of all record sales took place in that country.

== Awards, contests and festivals ==
The 31st Osaka International Festival (Japanese: 大阪国際フェスティバル) was held from 31 January to 14 May 1989. The 2nd "Band Explosion" festival was held on 12 February 1989. The international contest of the 18th Tokyo Music Festival was held on 2 June 1989. The 3rd Teens' Music Festival was held on 3 August 1989. The final of the 20th World Popular Song Festival was held on 27 October 1989. The 3rd "Band Explosion" festival was held on 29 October 1989. The final of the 18th FNS Music Festival was held on 12 December 1989. The 31st Japan Record Awards were held on 31 December 1989. The 40th NHK Kōhaku Uta Gassen was held on 31 December 1989.

Boøwy won the grand prix for Japanese artist of the year at the 3rd Japan Gold Disc Awards.

== Concerts ==
There was a Kenji Sawada concert at the Tokyo Bay NK Hall on 13 October 1989.

== Number one singles ==
Oricon

The following reached number 1 on the weekly Oricon Singles Chart:

| Issue date | Song | Artist(s) |
|---|---|---|
| 2 January | "Tonbo" | Tsuyoshi Nagabuchi |
| 9 January | "Tonbo" | Tsuyoshi Nagabuchi |
| 16 January | "Aki" | Otokogumi |
| 23 January | "Koi Hitoyo" | Shizuka Kudo |
| 30 January | "Koi Hitoyo" | Shizuka Kudo |
| 6 February | "True Love" | Yui Asaka |
| 13 February | "Ai ga Tomaranai (Turn It into Love)" | Wink |
| 20 February | "Gekiai" | Tsuyoshi Nagabuchi |
| 27 February | "Gekiai" | Tsuyoshi Nagabuchi |
| 6 March | "Rosécolor" | Miho Nakayama |
| 13 March | "Time Zone" | Otokogumi |
| 20 March | "Chikyu wo Sagashite" | Hikaru Genji |
| 27 March | "Namida wo Misenai de (Boys Don't Cry)" | Wink |
| 3 April | "Namida wo Misenai de (Boys Don't Cry)" | Wink |
| 10 April | "Namida wo Misenai de (Boys Don't Cry)" | Wink |
| 17 April | "Be My Baby" | Complex |
| 24 April | "Be My Baby" | Complex |
| 1 May | "Gomen yo Namida" | Toshihiko Tahara |
| 8 May | "Liar" | Akina Nakamori |
| 15 May | "Arashi no Sugao" | Shizuka Kudo |
| 22 May | "Arashi no Sugao" | Shizuka Kudo |
| 29 May | "Arashi no Sugao" | Shizuka Kudo |
| 5 June | "Return to Myself (Shinai, Shinai, Natsu.)" | Mari Hamada |
| 12 June | "Diamonds" | Princess Princess |
| 19 June | "Sayonara Baby" | Southern All Stars |
| 26 June | "Diamonds" | Princess Princess |
| 3 July | "Maitta ne Konya" | Shonentai |
| 10 July | "Sekai de Ichiban Atsui Natsu" | Princess Princess |
| 17 July | "Samishii Nettaigyo" | Wink |
| 24 July | "Samishii Nettaigyo" | Wink |
| 31 July | "Taiyo ga Ippai" | Hikaru Genji |
| 7 August | "Summer Game" | Kyosuke Himuro |
| 14 August | "Rockin' My Soul" | Otokogumi |
| 21 August | "Taiyo ga Ippai" | Hikaru Genji |
| 28 August | "Taiyo ga Ippai" | Hikaru Genji |
| 4 September | "Taiyo ga Ippai" | Hikaru Genji |
| 11 September | "Taiyo ga Ippai" | Hikaru Genji |
| 18 September | "Kōsa ni Fukarete" | Shizuka Kudo |
| 25 September | "Kōsa ni Fukarete" | Shizuka Kudo |
| 2 October | "Kōsa ni Fukarete" | Shizuka Kudo |
| 9 October | "Kōsa ni Fukarete" | Shizuka Kudo |
| 16 October | "Kōsa ni Fukarete" | Shizuka Kudo |
| 23 October | "Kōsa ni Fukarete" | Shizuka Kudo |
| 30 October | "Niji o Mitakai" | Misato Watanabe |
| 6 November | "Running to Horizon" | Tetsuya Komuro |
| 13 November | "One Night in Heaven (Mayonaka no Angel)" | Wink |
| 20 November | "One Night in Heaven (Mayonaka no Angel)" | Wink |
| 27 November | "Gravity of Love" | Tetsuya Komuro |
| 4 December | "Shiroi Christmas" | Jun Sky Walker(s) |
| 11 December | "Film no Mukōgawa" | Yoko Minamino |
| 18 December | "Shoppai Mikazuki no Yoru" | Tsuyoshi Nagabuchi |
| 25 December | "Christmas Eve" | Tatsuro Yamashita |

== Number one albums ==
Music Labo

The following reached number 1 on the Music Labo chart:

- 16 January: Best II - Akina Nakamori
- 31 January: Taboo - Buck-Tick
- 7 February: Root 5 - Barbee Boys
- 20 February: Stand Up!! 5 Years Realive Document - Eikichi Yazawa
- 7 March: Hey Say - Hikaru Genji
- 27 March: Joy - Shizuka Kudo
- 10 April: Showa - Tsuyoshi Nagabuchi
- 24 April and 1 May: Like a Prayer - Madonna
- 8 May: Complex - Complex
- 22 May: Dress - TM Network
- 12 July: Naporeon Fish To Oyoguhi - Motoharu Sano
- 19 June and 26 June: Return to Myself - Mari Hamada
- 3 July: Joji - Eikichi Yazawa
- 10 July and 24 July: Otokogumi Nimaime - Otokogumi
- 17 July: Flower Bed - Misato Watanabe
- 31 July: Seven Heaven - Checkers
- 7 August, 14 August, 21 August and 4 September: Cruise - Akina Nakamori
- 11 September: Wasted Tears - Shōgo Hamada
- 18 September: Outerlimits - Show-Ya
- 25 September: Karakuri House - La-ppisch
- 9 October and 16 October: Neo Fascio - Kyosuke Himuro
- 30 October: Red Monkey Yellow Fish - Senri Oe
- 13 November: I.B.W. - Bakufu Slump
- 20 November: 5 1/2 - Kome Kome Club
- 27 November: Lovers - Princess Princess
- 4 December, 18 December and 25 December: Love Wars - Yumi Matsutoya

Oricon

The following reached number 1 on the Oricon Albums Chart:

- 16 January: Best II - Akina Nakamori
- 15 May: Especially for You: Yasashisa ni Tsutsumarete by Wink
- 29 May: Blond Saurus - Rebecca
- 24 July: Gauche - Yoko Minamino
- 18 September: Hide 'n' Seek by Miho Nakayama
- 16 October, 23 October and 30 October: The Baddest by Toshinobu Kubota

== Annual charts ==
Princess Princess' Diamonds was number 1 in the Oricon annual singles chart.

== Film and television ==
The music of Untamagiru, by Kōji Ueno, won the 44th Mainichi Film Award for Best Music. The music of Black Rain and Rikyu, both by Tōru Takemitsu, won the 13th Japan Academy Film Prize for Best Music (awarded in 1990).

Ikaten was first broadcast on 11 February 1989 during the band boom (Japanese: バンドブーム, bando būmu).

The music of Hyper Psychic Geo Garaga (aka Garaga) is by Tatsumi Yano and includes vocals by Fuyuko Kurihara (栗原冬子).

== Debuts ==
- Satomi Matsushita
- 6 September: CoCo

== Other singles released ==
- Verge of Love, Shōnan Heartbreak and You're My Life by Yōko Oginome
- The Stress and Daite by Chisato Moritaka
- Virgin Eyes by Miho Nakayama
- Kurenai and Endless Rain by X Japan
- Kimi no Naka de Odoritai by B'z
- Aozora by The Blue Hearts

== Other albums and EPs released ==
- Beauty by Ryuichi Sakamoto
- Fair Tension by Yōko Oginome
- Twin Memories by Wink
- Hijitsuryokuha Sengen and Moritaka Land by Chisato Moritaka
- Karelia and Harvest by Shizuka Kudo
- Ballads and Merry Merry by Miho Nakayama
- Kaikinetsu by Miyuki Nakajima
- Soldier of Fortune by Loudness
- Wave by T-Square
- Blue Blood by X Japan
- Off the Lock and Bad Communication by B'z
- Realize by Hideaki Tokunaga
- Sincerely by Mari Hamada
- Water in Time and Space by Susumu Hirasawa
- Zero by Dead End

== Deaths ==
- 31 January: Yasushi Akutagawa
- 24 June: Hibari Misora

== See also ==
- Timeline of Japanese music
- 1989 in Japan
- 1989 in music
- w:ja:1989年の音楽
