= Hentai Kamen (film) =

- Poster
- Japanese: HK 変態仮面
- Directed by: Yūichi Fukuda
- Written by: Yūichi Fukuda
- Based on: Kyūkyoku!! Hentai Kamen by Keishū Ando
- Starring: Ryohei Suzuki
- Music by: Eishi Segawa
- Distributed by: T-Joy
- Release dates: April 6, 2013 (Shinjuku); April 13, 2013 (Japan)
- Running time: 105 minutes
- Country: Japan
- Language: Japanese
- Box office: ¥102 million

Hentai Kamen (released as HK: Forbidden Super Hero internationally) is a 2013 Japanese superhero comedy film written and directed by Yūichi Fukuda, starring Ryohei Suzuki in the title role and based on the manga series Kyūkyoku!! Hentai Kamen created by Keishū Ando. It was released in Japan by T-Joy on April 13, 2013. A sequel titled Hentai Kamen: Abnormal Crisis was released in Japan on May 14, 2016. Media Blasters licensed the first film, and retitled it to 'Forbidden Superhero'.

== Plot ==
Kyosuke is the son of a fallen cop and a dominatrix. Although tall and strong, he has little self-confidence or fighting skills. A twist of fate leads him to a hostage situation involving the new transfer student, Aiko Himeno. During Kyosuke's infiltration to try to help save the hostages, he learns by chance that wearing women's used underwear on his face awakens the dormant powers of his dominatrix mother and, combined with the influence of his policeman father's strong sense of justice, transforms him into a superhero - Hentai Kamen.

Hentai Kamen becomes famous, with his heroics being covered by newspapers and TV. Kyosuke's relationship with Aiko also seems to be improving. However, Kyosuke battles with his new identity as despite his new abilities, he struggles to accept that he might actually be so perverted as to gain powers through wearing used women's panties.

Kyosuke and Aiko arrive at their martial arts club to find all members defeated by the new transfer student, Tamao Ogane. Kyosuke eventually transforms into Hentai Kamen, fighting and defeating Tamao and his henchmen. Tamao is rich and powerful, pooling his resources, he summoned all sorts of oddities to face Kyosuke.

The following day, Kyosuke attempted to apologize to Aiko, but she would not hear it. Kyosuke attempted to explain that he tried to get a teacher's help, but Aiko felt he did not help at all as only Hentai Kamen saved him. It was then the Goody Two-shoes Division appeared and began beating people for violating school codes. Goody Two-shoes Man was the leader of the group and none of the students could stop him. After taking Aiko to safety, Kyosuke became Hentai Kamen and fought Goody Two-shoes Man. Kyosuke was weakened when the division wrapped him in clothes, taking away his perverted powers and got him beaten. However, Hentai Kamen found pleasure in the beating and Goody Two-shoes man became unhinged and lost the fight to Kyosuke. This would only be the start in a series of unusual men all meant to bring down Hentai Kamen.

Pleasant Man arrived to the school and attempted to weaken Hentai Kamen with his pleasantness. With the feelings of pleasantness taking over him, Kyosuke used his Perverted Dance and caused Pleasant Man to freak out and choked out his pleasantness. The next would be Manly Man (aka Moho Man), a homosexual villain that attempts to love Hentai Kamen, but Kyosuke managed to escape his grasp. Just as he escaped, he found Slenderly Fit Man and challenged his fitness. It only took a simple jab to the stomach and Slenderly Fit Man was defeated. With all four assassins defeated, Tamao is angered that nobody can defeat his enemy. However, one of his men noticed that Hentai Kamen often appears when Aiko is around and they plot a new trap for him.

Kyosuke's class has a new teacher, Towatari Sensei. It was during this time, Towatari had taken an interest in Aiko as she is behind in school. During this time, a new pervert is on the loose and looks very similar to Hentai Kamen and has been randomly sexually harassing people on the streets. Destroying Kyosuke's credibility, the copycat is character assassinating Hentai Kamen and now the public thinks he is not a hero, but just a true pervert. Unwilling to let this slide, Kyosuke found and confronted his doppelganger. Unfortunately, the pervert is more experienced than Kyosuke and draws his perversion powers through humiliation. With Hentai Kamen defeated, he was warned to never appear as Hentai Kamen ever again.

With Kyosuke defeated, Tamao felt he has won the right to take over the school. However, many of the students refuse to accept his rule and it was met with limited resistance. Kyosuke searched and found Aiko and found out she has been in a hypnotic trance for some time. Kyosuke would bump into Towatari and realized he is the fake Hentai Kamen that has been defaming him. With his perverted powers weakened, Kyosuke could not call forth Hentai Kamen. Tamao had a face off with Kyosuke at their gym, while being beaten, Kyosuke realized he had to draw his powers from a different emotional spectrum and he drew it from justice. Able to draw his perverted powers from this new feeling, Kyosuke restored himself as Hentai Kamen and defeated Tamao in combat. However, Towatari still had Aiko as hostage. Challenging to a final showdown, the two perverts fought.

More energized than ever, Kyosuke had the advantage and bested himself against Towatari. Both used their groin to use their Spinning Fire attack. However, Kyosuke had the advantage and power and defeated him. With his mask ruined, Aiko finally saw Kyosuke's face underneath the panties. Aiko has been emotionally confused as she have feelings for both Kyosuke and Hentai Kamen, but knowing they are the same person explains recent events. Tamao was not done with his rampage and made a powerful robot to destroy the school. To save it, Kyosuke asked Aiko for her panties and she reluctantly obliged. Now super charged with Aiko's panties, Hentai Kamen charged himself through the balls of the robot and finally ended Tomao. In the aftermath, Kyosuke had a wet dream about Aiko while in class and had a massive erection. While being called to stand in class to read, everyone realized Kyosuke was hard and he had to embarrassingly hide his erection.

== Cast ==
- Ryohei Suzuki as Kyosuke / Hentai Kamen
- Fumika Shimizu as Aiko Himeno
- Tsuyoshi Muro
- Ken Yasuda
- Nana Katase

== Release ==
The film was released in Japan in 2013 and was screened at the Austin Fantastic Fest. It was released on Blu-Ray in the UK on 15 September 2014.

=== Box office ===
In its second week of release, it earned 17,173,040 yen (US$172,506) on 12 screens for a gross total of 23,333,119 yen (US$234,385). It grossed over 100 million yen in Japan. It grossed $133,063 in Hong Kong.

=== Critical reception ===
The film received mostly positive reviews. The Hollywood Reporter said that it "works surprisingly well in the hands of Fukuda and his appealing cast, and is especially refreshing for those who've come to resent Hollywood's reliance on comic-book properties." Twitch Film awarded it a similarly positive review, saying: "HK: Hentai Kamen has its flaws but it's a big, colourful, bizarre comedy that is a lot of fun and has enough effective visual jokes to make it well worth a watch, if only for its novelty value." Asian Filmist said: "The film’s premise is vulgar and obscene, but that’s what makes it strangely engrossing. Hentai Kamen is a departure from the typical superhero flick, but that’s also what makes it stand out (hehe)." Birth Movies Death gave the film an overall positive review, but were critical of its lack of depth, saying "displays lots of inventive variations on its premise, but never delves into it with any real depth. What you see is what you get."

== Sequel ==
The sequel Hentai Kamen: Abnormal Crisis opened in Japan on May 14, 2016.
