= Joy (Shizuka Kudo album) =

Studio album by Shizuka Kudo
- Released: March 15, 1989
- Genre: Pop soul
- Length: 37:48
- Label: Pony Canyon
- Producer: Yūzō Watanabe

Shizuka Kudo chronology
| Gradation (1988) | Joy (1989) | Karelia (1989) |

Singles from Joy
- 1. "Koi Hitoyo" Released: December 28, 1988

Joy (stylized as JOY) is the third studio album by Japanese singer Shizuka Kudo. It was released on March 15, 1989, through Pony Canyon. It is the first of three albums released by Kudo that year: it was followed by the concept album Karelia in October and the compilation album Harvest in December. A limited first pressing of Joy was released in gold CD format. Kudo has stated that Joy is one of her favorite albums she has recorded. Nanase Aikawa has also listed the album as a major influence behind her decision to pursue a musical career. Joy was re-issued in APO-CD format on December 1, 1993.

== Commercial performance ==
The standard edition of Joy debuted at number one on the Oricon Albums Chart, with 131,000 units sold in its first week, while the limited edition entered the chart at number three, with 47,000 copies sold. The standard edition dropped three positions to number four on its second week, selling 57,000 copies. It slid up to number three the following week, logging sales of 41,000 copies. It fell to number five next, where it stayed for two consecutive weeks, selling 26,000 and 19,000 copies, respectively. The album dropped to number eight the following week, then to number thirteen. It rose to number ten on its eighth week, charting one last time in the top ten. The album fell back down to number thirteen before dropping out from the top twenty the next week. The standard edition of Joy charted in the top 100 for seventeen weeks, selling a reported total of 360,000 copies during its run, while the limited edition charted for four weeks, selling a reported total of 56,000 copies. Joy, the standard edition, was ranked number 24 on the year-end Oricon Albums Chart.

== Track listing ==
All tracks composed and arranged by Tsugutoshi Gotō.

| No. | Title | Lyrics | Length |
|---|---|---|---|
| 1. | "Tenshi Mitai ni Odorasete" (天使みたいに踊らせて), "Handle Me Like an Angel") | Gorō Matsui | 4:25 |
| 2. | "Totemo Chīsana Shōshin" (とても小さな傷心, "Tiny Heartbreak") | Matsui | 2:59 |
| 3. | "Kiseki no Shōzō" (奇跡の肖像, "Miraculous Portrait") | Masami Tozawa | 3:30 |
| 4. | "Sora no Shōmen" (宇宙の正面, "The Face of the Universe") | Neko Oikawa | 3:39 |
| 5. | "Samishī Yoru ni wa Watashi o Yonde" (寂しい夜には私を呼んで, "Call Me on Your Lonely Nights") | Keiko Asō | 4:07 |
| 6. | "No No No No (Kohaku no Cocktail)" (No no no no ～琥珀のCocktail～, "No No No No (Amber Cocktail)") | Jun Taguchi | 3:01 |
| 7. | "Yume Utsutsu Jealousy" (夢うつつジェラシー, Yume Utsutsu Jerashī, "Entranced Jealousy") | Tozawa | 4:14 |
| 8. | "Garasu no Sanctuary" (硝子のサンクチュアリ, Garasu no Sankuchuari, "Glass Sanctuary") | Shintarō Hirai | 3:52 |
| 9. | "Mayonaka no Collect Call" (真夜中のコレクトコール, Mayonaka no Korekuto Kōru, "Midnight Collect Call") | Yoshiko Miura | 3:30 |
| 10. | "Koi Hitoyo" | Matsui | 4:31 |
| Total length: | | | 37:48 |

== Charts ==
=== Standard edition ===
| Chart (1989) | Peak position | Sales |
|---|---|---|
| Japan Weekly Albums (Oricon) | 1 | 360,000 |
| Japan Yearly Albums (Oricon) | 24 | 360,000 |

=== Limited edition ===
| Chart (1989) | Peak position | Sales |
|---|---|---|
| Japan Weekly Albums (Oricon) | 3 | 56,000 |

== Certification ==
| Region | Certification | Certified units/sales |
|---|---|---|
| Japan (RIAJ) | Platinum | 400,000^{^} |
^{^} Shipments figures based on certification alone.

== Release history ==
| Region | Date | Format(s) | Label | Ref. |
|---|---|---|---|---|
| Japan | March 15, 1989 | Vinyl; CD; gold CD; cassette | Pony Canyon | |
| Japan | December 1, 1993 | APO-CD | Pony Canyon | |
| Various | March 9, 2016 | Digital download | Pony Canyon | |

== See also ==
- List of Oricon number-one albums
- 1989 in Japanese music
