= Hentai Kamen: Abnormal Crisis =

- Poster
- Kanji: HK 変態仮面 アブノーマル・クライシス
- Directed by: Yūichi Fukuda
- Screenplay by: Yūichi Fukuda
- Based on: Kyūkyoku!! Hentai Kamen by Keishū Ando
- Starring: Ryohei Suzuki
- Distributed by: Toei Company
- Release date: May 14, 2016
- Running time: 118 minutes
- Country: Japan
- Language: Japanese

Hentai Kamen: Abnormal Crisis (HK 変態仮面 アブノーマル・クライシス) is a 2016 Japanese superhero action comedy film written and directed by Yūichi Fukuda, starring Ryohei Suzuki in the title role and based on the manga series Kyūkyoku!! Hentai Kamen created by Keishū Ando. The film is a sequel to 2013's Hentai Kamen. It was released in Japan by Toei Company on May 14, 2016.

== Plot ==
After surviving his battle against Tamao Ogane, Kyosuke is now in college with Aiko. However, things have not been easy. Although he promised Aiko to stop being Hentai Kamen (Pervert Mask), he always used Aiko's panties to help him transform into Hentai Kamen to stop crime. He lost his pizza delivery job after running late to defeat a duo of bank robbers. In a conversation in the campus cafeteria, Aiko told Kyosuke that although she thinks Hentai Kamen's actions are good and she actually likes his heroics, she cannot stand his perverseness and she prefers him to be normal. To ensure he keeps his promise, she demanded her panties back. Kyosuke reluctantly returned them.

Just as Kyosuke decided to retire as Hentai Kamen, all the girls in his class had missing panties. Aiko thought Kyosuke did it, but he swears he did not. The new biology teacher, Ayata Sensei, had Kyosuke privately come to her office to speak. Ayata confessed her feelings for him. Shocked at her claim, she told Kyosuke that he is her type and wants to be with him. While Kyosuke was flattered by Ayata's advances, he made it clear he is with Aiko. As he ran off, he heard a scream. When he ran to see what was happening, a classmate's panties seems to be tugged away by wind force. Kyosuke tried to grab the panties back, but Aiko walked into the situation, believing Kyosuke's perverse nature would not allow him to give up panties and ran off disappointed.

While sulking towards home, he found himself bumping into Ayata again and was invited to her place for dinner. While talking, an angry ex-boyfriend of Ayata came to kill them both. Scared for his life, he tried to hide himself in Ayata's room and looked for panties to transform with. However, he remembered Aiko's words and resisted transforming. Kyosuke managed to disarm and punch the boyfriend to scare him off. Grateful for the save, Ayata walked with Kyosuke outside and pecked him on his cheek and found Aiko witnessing the whole thing in her car. Disappointed what she saw, Aiko drove away. At home, Kyosuke noticed there had been a power outage. Kyosuke's mom appeared with candles, ready for wax play on Kyosuke when he realized the outage is not normal and he headed out to investigate. It was while following the flying panties that he found Mr. Vacuum, an agent of Tamao.

Mr. Vacuum has the ability to selectively suck used panties right off any woman and keep it in his backpack. The villain admitted this is part of the plan to take away all the women's panties so that Kyosuke have no more panties to transform with. However, Kyosuke made it clear that he will never transform into Hentai Kamen ever again. With that knowledge, Mr. Vacuum had his henchmen beat Kyosuke. In such a desperate situation, Kyosuke needed panties to survive. He realized he has Ayata's panty and decided to use it. Charged with the power of forbidden ecstasy, Hentai Kamen returns and defeats all the henchmen with his martial arts and shocking them with his electrifying groin. Mr. Vacuum attempted to suck the panty right off Kyosuke's face to de-power him, but Kyosuke powered up and fly towards Mr. Vacuum, frog-splashing his groin to Mr. Vacuum and defeating him. As Hentai Mask is about to leave, Mr. Vacuum informs Kyosuke that Tamao is still alive. While swinging back home, Kyosuke noticed he feels very weak and drained of power.

The following day, the entire campus is abuzz about Hentai Kamen. Kyosuke looked for Aiko to warn her about Tamao, but she did not believe him as no one could survive the explosion. She then brought up Kyosuke's love for being Hentai Kamen and him seeing Ayata. Aiko made it clear she will be taking a break in New York and that Kyosuke should enjoy himself with Ayata. In an abandoned building, it has been revealed Tamao's body has been destroyed, but his head survived. He has been secretly plotting against Kyosuke to prevent Hentai Kamen from ever returning. Using a mind control device, Tamao mind controlled Kyosuke's classmate, Makoto, to come to his lair to offer him power. Makoto likes Aiko and Tamao offered him the power to remove Kyosuke as an obstacle. Eager to have Aiko, Makoto quickly accepted and fused his body between a guitar, king crab, and a Dyson vacuum to become Dynoson, a powerful cybernetic mutant.

Dynoson attacked the school campus and kidnapped Ayata. With Makoto's vacuum powers, he sucked away all the panties and Kyosuke was unable to stop him. However, Ayata had her favorite pair of panties with her and gave it to Kyosuke to transform. Although he managed to transform into Hentai Kamen, Dynoson proved to be too powerful and Kyosuke was defeated. Shortly after his defeat, the panties throughout Japan continues to be sucked away. Kyosuke is too weak and powerless to stop Tamao's evil. Kyosuke believed only the power of his beloved Aiko's panties can help him attain greater perverted powers to take down Dynoson and flew to New York City to find Aiko. Using his enhanced nose, he tracked Aiko's scent to her house. Unfortunately, the place has been wrecked and Kyosuke realized Dynoson beat him to Aiko. Kyosuke found Aiko and Dynoson at Times Square and attempted to stop him. In a spoof battle of Dr. Octopus versus Spider-Man in Spider-Man 2, Dynoson and Hentai Kamen battled at the rooftops of New York as Kyosuke swings through the buildings with his bondage rope. Too weak to take down Dynoson, Tamao revealed himself in a message that he will be holding onto Aiko until Kyosuke comes for her and runs off.

Severely weakened by the battle, Kyosuke realized his body has emaciated. While resting, the dead spirit of Kyosuke's father came to him to reveal why he's so weak. His dad explains him the reason why he has weakened so greatly is Ayata's panty. He explains the power of panties gives Hentai Kamen power, but those panties are cursed and that he should not use them. His father told him that the only way to become stronger is to become even a greater pervert of justice. He advised Kyosuke to head to a secluded area in Japan to find the Great Legendary Pervert to attain greater power. At the top, he encounters the legendary pervert and he agreed to train Kyosuke to become a greater pervert.

After a week of mundane activity, Kyosuke felt it was time to master the new perverted technique to gain greater power. However, the legendary pervert told him he probably already attained it. Usually, Kyosuke cannot transform with a fresh pair of panties. However, this time he can. As Hentai Kamen, he was confused what has happened. The legendary pervert revealed his true powers by wearing a bra. In his powered form, the pervert told Kyosuke that he used to be a passive pervert, but after a week without contact with women, he has become a stoic pervert. This means his perverted sensitivity has increased to the point that he can transform even with fresh panties. He told Kyosuke that he can use the power of fresh panties to track Aiko's scent. Ready to face Tamao, the pervert asked Kyosuke to help him pay off his utilities bill while heading back down and it was then Kyosuke realized the pervert is really his grandfather. As a parting gift, Kyosuke's perverted grandfather gave him a long nosed red demon mask.

At Tamao's hidden lair, Aiko is chained and Makoto talks about marrying her. It was when he rolled down the wedding cake that Hentai Kamen came out of the cake. Armed with his long-nosed demon mask, Kyosuke wore to give himself greater power. His groin now looks like a massive masked erection. Tamao's men fired at Kyosuke, but he used his demon mask to bat off any bullets at his direction. Appearing to bat off bullets with his penis, Kyosuke defeated the shooters and faced Dynoson. With Kyosuke's new powers, he was able to defeat Makoto and face Tamao. However, Tamao had Aiko and Ayata as hostages. With Tamao's new android body, Kyosuke was beaten to death. It was then that Ayata revealed that she's an agent of Tamao the entire time. Believing Kyosuke to be dead, Aiko still had faith he is still alive somehow.

Aiko wore a fresh pair of panties to make it hers and then took it off to mask it on Kyosuke. When it did not work, Aiko thought she will have to face Tamao alone and was quickly pushed away. It was then everyone realized Kyosuke survived and now powered by Aiko's panties, his power is even greater. Tamao was fed up and transformed himself into a kaiju version of himself to kill Kyosuke. Hentai Kamen rose to the challenge by throwing himself into Tamao's giant robotic mouth, where Kyosuke traveled through Tamao's body and landed on his robotic groin area. Using all his power, Kyosuke defeated Tamao for the second time by blowing the balls off his robot. Tamao's entire body was destroyed and Kyosuke managed to rescue Aiko. Ayata managed to escape the battle by peddling away in a bike.

In the aftermath, Makoto is normal again and friends with Kyosuke and Aiko. It was while some wind blew that a girl's panties was exposed. This time, both Kyosuke and Makoto had a massive erection to lift the table. Disgusted at his reaction, Aiko walked off with Kyosuke chasing her down while still having an erection. Unknown to Kyosuke, a black substance latched onto Kyosuke.

== Cast ==
- Ryohei Suzuki as Kyosuke / Hentai Kamen
- Fumika Shimizu as Aiko Himeno
- Yūya Yagira as Tadashi Kotomi
- Tsuyoshi Muro
- Ayame Misaki
- Nana Katase
- Narushi Ikeda
- Ken Yasuda

== Reception ==
James Hadfield of The Japan Times gave the film three out of five stars, saying: "For a quick fix of trashy comic-book irreverence, this homegrown product should do the trick nicely."
