= Akaitori Nigeta =

- Type A cover

Single by Akina Nakamori
- Language: Japanese
- English title: The Red Bird Flies Away
- B-side: "Babylon (Remix Long Version)"
- Released: May 1, 1985
- Recorded: 1985
- Genre: J-pop; kayōkyoku; Latin
- Length: 5:07
- Label: Reprise Records
- Composer: Naoya Matsuoka
- Lyricist: Chinfa Kan
- Producer: Yūzō Shimada

Akina Nakamori singles chronology
"Meu amor é..." (1985)	"Akaitori Nigeta" (1985)	"Sand Beige (Sabaku e)" (1985)

Alternative cover
- Type B cover

"Akaitori Nigeta" (赤い鳥逃げた; lit. "The Red Bird Flies Away") is a single by Japanese entertainer Akina Nakamori. Written by Chinfa Kan and Naoya Matsuoka, the single was released on May 1, 1985, by Warner Pioneer through the Reprise label.

== Background ==
"Akaitori Nigeta" was originally planned as Nakamori's 11th single, but producer Yūzō Shimada rejected it, as he felt the lyrics lacked the impact to be released as a single. As a result, the lyrics were reworked into what became "Meu amor é...". With the success of "Meu amor é...", "Akaitori Nigeta" was released as a 12" EP. The single was re-released on December 21, 1985 with a different jacket cover to coincide with the release of Nakamori's mini-album My Best Thanks.

== Chart performance ==
"Akaitori Nigeta" became Nakamori's eighth No. 1 on Oricon's weekly singles chart and sold over 353,700 copies.

== Track listing ==
Original release
No.	Title	Lyrics	Music	Arrangement	Length
1.	"Akaitori Nigeta ('Meu amor é...' Latin Long Version in Another Lyrics)" ((赤い鳥逃げた(「ミ・アモーレ」別歌詞&ラテン・ロング・ヴァージョン); "The Red Bird Flies Away"))	Chinfa Kan	Naoya Matsuoka	Matsuoka	5:07
2.	"Babylon" (Remix Long Version)	Sandii	Makoto Kubota	Akira Inoue; Kubota	6:32
Total length:					11:39

== Charts ==
Chart (1985)	Peak position
Japan (Oricon)	1

== Release history ==
Year	Format(s)	Serial number	Label(s)	Ref.
1985	12inch LP	L-3601	Warner Pioneer	
1988	8cm CD	10SL-141	Warner Pioneer	
2008	Digital download	-	Warner Pioneer	
2014	Digital download - remaster	-	Warner Pioneer	

== See also ==
- 1985 in Japanese music
