= Fu-ji-tsu =

Single by Shizuka Kudo

from the album Shizuka
- Released: June 1, 1988
- Genre: Pop
- Length: 3:48
- Label: Pony Canyon
- Songwriters: Miyuki Nakajima; Tsugutoshi Gotō
- Producer: Tsugutoshi Gotō

Shizuka Kudo singles chronology
"Daite Kuretara Ii no ni" (1988)	"Fu-ji-tsu" (1988)	"Mugon... Iroppoi" (1988)

Audio sample
- "Fu-ji-tsu": file; help

"Fu-ji-tsu" (stylized in all caps) is a song recorded by Japanese singer Shizuka Kudo for her eponymous second studio album, Shizuka. It was released on June 1, 1988 through Pony Canyon as the album's leading single. The song was written by Miyuki Nakajima and composed and produced by Tsugutoshi Gotō. This collaboration with a respected singer-songwriter like Nakajima, as well as Kudo's overall shift in image, were seen as a catalyst for the end of the 1980s idol phenomenon, with Kudo's career path being regarded as the blueprint for the successful transition from idol to artist.

== Background ==
When Kudo's solo debut was in the works, she was asked by then-Pony Canyon music executive Yūzō Watanabe to choose which singer-songwriter, out of Yumi Matsutōya, Mariya Takeuchi and Miyuki Nakajima, she preferred. Kudo chose Nakajima, whom she was a big fan of. This story, which had been floated around at the time as a sort of urban legend of the music industry, actually took place and shortly thereafter Nakajima was writing songs for Kudo. "Fu-ji-tsu" marks the first collaboration between Nakajima and Tsugutoshi Gotō, who are often cited as the "golden duo" behind many of Kudo's hit singles.

== Composition ==
The song was written by Miyuki Nakajima and Tsugutoshi Gotō. It starts with an intro in B major, followed by verses in D major and choruses in E minor, and ends with a coda in G major. The tempo is 136 beats per minute. Kudo's vocals span from A_{3} to B_{4}. The title of the song, which loosely translates to "Untruth", was written in roman letters because Nakajima felt that the kanji for "fujitsu" (不実) was too heavy for the then-18-year-old Kudo to be singing about. Hyphens were added to the title in order for the song not be confused with the IT company Fujitsu. Lyrically, the song describes the feelings of two former lovers who pretend not to know each other, or tell "untruths", in the presence of their new respective significant others.

== Critical reception ==
Kudo received acclaim for her vocal performance. Her voice was cited as "well-matched" to the melancholy melody of the song. "Fu-ji-tsu" is considered by critics to be the song that established Kudo as Akina Nakamori's successor to the pop crown. Upon hearing Kudo perform her lyrics on the television show Uta no Top Ten for the first time, Nakajima phoned in during the show as special guest and described Kudo's delivery of her lyrics as "giving it a greater than life image unlike what I had initially imagined." She added that, for that reason, she was glad to have offered the song to Kudo instead of keeping it for herself.

== Chart performance ==
"Fu-ji-tsu" debuted at number-one on the Oricon Singles Chart, with 60,000 copies sold, becoming Kudo's first number-one debut since "Kindan no Telepathy". The song was recognized by Oricon as the second best-selling single of June 1988, edged out from the top spot only by Akina Nakamori's "Tattoo". The single charted for a total of twenty weeks. It became the first of eight consecutive number-one songs on the Oricon Singles Chart for Kudo.

== Track listing ==
All music is composed by Tsugutoshi Gotō.

No.	Title	Lyrics	Arranger(s)	Length
1.	"Fu-ji-tsu"	Miyuki Nakajima	Tsugutoshi Gotō	3:48
2.	"Natsu ga Kureta Miracle" (夏がくれたミラクル, Natsu ga Kureta Mirakuru, "A Summer Miracle")	Gorō Matsui	Gotō	3:56
Total length:				7:44

== Charts ==
Chart (1988)	Peak position	Sales
Japan Weekly Singles (Oricon)	1	253,000
Japan Monthly Singles (Oricon)	2	253,000
Japan Yearly Singles (Oricon)	23	253,000

== See also ==
- List of Oricon number-one singles
- 1988 in Japanese music
