= Shizuka (album) =

Studio album by Shizuka Kudo
- Released: July 21, 1988
- Genre: Pop Soul
- Length: 23:19
- Label: Pony Canyon
- Producer: Yūzō Watanabe

Shizuka Kudo chronology
Mysterious (1988)	Shizuka (1988)	Gradation (1989)

Singles from Shizuka
- 1. "Fu-ji-tsu" Released: June 1, 1988

Shizuka (静香(しずか)) is the second studio album by Japanese singer Shizuka Kudo. It was released on July 21, 1988, through Pony Canyon. The eponymous record is often cited as an EP, despite being officially regarded as her second album. Shizuka is entirely written and composed by Miyuki Nakajima and Tsugutoshi Gotō, respectively. Nakajima recorded a cover of the fifth track, "Hadashi no Lion", for her album Otogibanashi: Fairy Ring (2002). Shizuka was re-issued in gold CD on March 21, 1989, and later in APO-CD format on December 1, 1993.

== Commercial performance ==
Shizuka debuted at number one on the Oricon Albums Chart, with 69,000 units sold in its first week, making it Kudo's first album to reach the top of the chart. It spent six non-consecutive weeks in the top ten. The album charted in the top 100 for twenty weeks, selling a reported total of 265,000 copies during its run. Shizuka was ranked number 35 on the year-end Oricon Albums Chart.

== Track listing ==
All lyrics written by Miyuki Nakajima; all tracks composed and arranged by Tsugutoshi Gotō.

No.	Title	Length
1.	"Shōko o Misete" (証拠をみせて), "Show Me Proof")	4:36
2.	"Sayonara no Gyakusetsu" (さよならの逆説, "The Paradox of Goodbye")	4:28
3.	"Fu-ji-tsu"	3:49
4.	"Brilliant White" (ブリリアント・ホワイト, Buririanto Howaito)	5:15
5.	"Hadashi no Lion" (裸爪のライオン, Hadashi no Raion, "Bareclawed Lion")	5:11
Total length:		23:19

== Charts ==
Chart (1988)	Peak position	Sales
Japan Weekly Albums (Oricon)	1	265,000
Japan Yearly Albums (Oricon)	35	265,000

== Release history ==
Region	Date	Format(s)	Label	Ref.
Japan	July 21, 1988	Vinyl; CD; cassette	Pony Canyon	
Japan	March 21, 1989	Gold CD	Pony Canyon	
Japan	December 1, 1993	APO-CD	Pony Canyon	
Various	August 9, 2017	Digital download	Pony Canyon	

== See also ==
- List of Oricon number-one albums
- 1988 in Japanese music
