= Reichi Nakaido =

- Also known as: Chabo
- Born: Hideaki Kato; October 9, 1950 (age 75); Shinjuku, Tokyo, Japan
- Genres: Rock, blues, R&B
- Occupations: Musician, singer-songwriter
- Instruments: Guitar, vocals
- Years active: 1969–present
- Labels: Toshiba EMI
- Website: up-down.com

Hideaki Katō (Japanese: 加藤秀明, Hepburn: Katō Hideaki; born October 9, 1950), known professionally as Reichi Nakaido (仲井戸麗市, Nakaido Reichi) and nicknamed Chabo, is a Japanese musician and singer-songwriter. He is best known as one of the guitarists and vocalists of the rock band RC Succession. Nakaido was voted the third greatest Japanese guitarist in a 2019 poll held by goo.

== Biography ==
Nakaido was born in Shinjuku, Tokyo in 1950.

While attending high school, he formed a band named Furuido. After personnel changes, Furuido became a duo consisting of him and Yoshitaro Kanazaki. They made a record debut in 1971. Their best-known number "Sanae chan", track 11 on Furuido no Sekai was written by Nakaido. It sings about his first love Sanae in Kindergarten. Their song "Nantoka Nare", the album's seventh track, was featured as the opening theme for the anime adaptation of the manga Akagi.

Furuido disbanded in 1979, and Nakaido joined RC Succession the same year replacing Kenchi Haren. Furuido has since been described as a "legendary" folk duo. He was with RC Succession until it ceased to perform in 1990. During his tenure, the group released noted songs like "Ameagari no Yozora ni" and enjoyed its peak of success.

After 1991, Nakaido went solo performing with his own Chabo Band as well as Reiran, a duo with Kohei Tsuchiya. He performed with RC Succession partner Kiyoshiro Imawano from time to time until Imawano's death in 2009, though the band never reunited.

Nakaido composed much of the music for the anime Serial Experiments Lain, which was eventually released as a soundtrack. RC Succession's song "Tooi Sakebi" (Cry in the Distance) was used as the ending theme for the series.

== Discography ==
- 1985 Nakaido Reiichi Book
- 1990 E
- 1992 Dada
- 1994 Glad All Over (with Kiyoshiro Imawano)
- 1995 Present #1
- 1996 Present #2
- 1996 Present #3
- 1997 Great Spirit
- 1997 Soul to Soul
- 1997 Present #4
- 1999 My R&R
- 2000 Works
- 2002 Time
