= Karelia (album) =

Studio album by Shizuka Kudo
- Released: October 4, 1989
- Genre: Pop; folk
- Length: 31:05
- Label: Pony Canyon
- Producer: Yūzō Watanabe

Shizuka Kudo chronology
Joy (1989)	Karelia (1989)	Harvest (1989)

Karelia (カレリア, Kareria) is the fourth studio album by Japanese singer Shizuka Kudo. It was released on October 4, 1989, through Pony Canyon. It is a concept album inspired by the music from Finnish Karelia. The album was entirely recorded in Finland and features the Helsinki Philharmonic Orchestra as well as a choir group from the University of Helsinki. Despite being composed and produced by Tsugutoshi Gotō, Karelia lacks any trace of the signature rock style of Gotō's other compositions. The record features lyrics penned by Taeko Onuki and also includes the first song written by Kudo herself, under the pseudonym Aeri. While in Finland, Kudo created oil paintings inspired by the people and landscapes, which were incorporated into the design of the album's packaging. Karelia was re-issued in APO-CD format on December 1, 1993.

== Commercial performance ==
Karelia debuted at number two on the Oricon Albums Chart, with 131,000 units sold in its first week. It stayed at number two the following week, selling 65,000 copies. It slid to number three on its third charting week, with 33,000 copies sold. It fell to number five next, logging sales of 23,000 copies. The album held onto the top ten one last week, charting at number eight and selling 14,000 copies. It ranked at number seventeen on its sixth charting week, before dropping out of the top twenty the following week. Karelia charted in the top 100 for nine straight weeks, selling a reported total of 293,000 copies during its run. It was ranked number 39 on the year-end Oricon Albums Chart for the year 1989.

== Track listing ==
All music is composed by Tsugutoshi Gotō.

No.	Title	Lyrics	Arranger(s)	Length
1.	"Oka no Ue no Chīsana Taiyō (丘の上の小さな太陽, "The Small Sun on the Hill"): Part 1. Shōjo (少女, "Girl"); Part 2. Koi (恋, "Love"); Part 3. Dasanakatta Tegami, Haha e (出さなかった手紙・母へ, "Unsent Letter, Dear Mother")"	Taeko Onuki	Tsugutoshi Gotō; Satoshi Kadokura; Hiroaki Sugawara; Takeshi Fujī	7:57
2.	"Mizuumi" (みずうみ, "Lake")	Kumiko Yoshizawa	Gotō; Kadokura; Sugawara	4:14
3.	"Bishō no Mori" (美粧の森, "Forest of Beautification")	Aeri	Gotō; Kadokura; Sugawara	5:00
4.	"Karelia" (カレリア, Kareria)	Onuki	Gotō; Kadokura; Sugawara	4:36
5.	"La Se N" ("Spiral")	Masumi Kawamura	Gotō; Kadokura; Sugawara	7:14
6.	"Mahiru no Yume" (Instrumental; 真昼の夢, "Daydream")		Gotō; Kadokura; Fujī	2:04
Total length:				31:05

== Charts ==
Chart (1989)	Peak position
Japan Weekly Albums (Oricon)	2
Japan Yearly Albums (Oricon)	39

== Certification ==
Region	Certification	Certified units/sales
Japan (RIAJ)	Gold	200,000^{^}
^{^} Shipments figures based on certification alone.

== Release history ==
Region	Date	Format(s)	Label	Ref.
Japan	October 4, 1989	CD; cassette	Pony Canyon	
Japan	December 1, 1993	APO-CD	Pony Canyon	
Various	August 9, 2017	Digital download	Pony Canyon	

== See also ==
- 1989 in Japanese music
