= Mysterious (album) =

Studio album by Shizuka Kudo
- Released: January 21, 1988
- Genre: Pop
- Length: 37:15
- Label: Pony Canyon
- Producer: Yūzō Watanabe

Shizuka Kudo chronology
Mysterious (1988)	Shizuka (1988)

Singles from Mysterious
- 1. "Kindan no Telepathy" Released: August 31, 1987; 2. "Again" Released: December 2, 1987

Mysterious (ミステリアス, Misuteriasu) is the debut studio album by Japanese singer Shizuka Kudo. It was released on January 21, 1988, through Pony Canyon. Mysterious was re-issued in gold CD on March 21, 1991, and later in APO-CD format on December 1, 1995.

== Commercial performance ==
Mysterious debuted at number three on the Oricon Albums Chart, with 62,000 units sold in its first week. It stayed at number three the following week. The album charted in the top 100 for seventeen weeks, of which seven where spent in the top twenty, selling a reported total of 233,000 copies during its run. Mysterious was ranked number 40 on the year-end Oricon Albums Chart.

== Track listing ==
All tracks composed and arranged by Tsugutoshi Gotō.

No.	Title	Lyrics	Length
1.	"Kanashimi no Etranger" (哀しみのエトランゼ), Kanashimi no Etoranze, "Sad Stranger")	Jun Taguchi	5:16
2.	"Mysterious" (ミステリアス, Misuteriasu)	Yoshiko Miura	4:55
3.	"Kindan no Telepathy"	Yasushi Akimoto	3:47
4.	"Arashi no Yoru no Serenade" (嵐の夜のセレナーデ, Arashi no Yoru no Serenāde, "Stormy Night Serenade")	Taguchi	5:14
5.	"Passage" (パッセージ, Passēji)	Miura	4:16
6.	"Wine Hitokuchi no Uso" (ワインひとくちの嘘, Wain Hitokuchi no Uso, "Lying After One Sip of Wine")	Gorō Matsui	4:49
7.	"Again"	Akimoto	4:14
8.	"Subete wa Sore Kara" (すべてはそれから, "Everything Began With That")	Akimoto	4:44
Total length:			37:15

== Charts ==
Chart (1988)	Peak position	Sales
Japan Weekly Albums (Oricon)	3	233,000
Japan Yearly Albums (Oricon)	40	233,000

== Release history ==
Region	Date	Format(s)	Label	Ref.
Japan	January 21, 1988	Vinyl; CD; cassette	Pony Canyon	
Japan	March 21, 1989	Gold CD	Pony Canyon	
Japan	December 1, 1993	APO-CD	Pony Canyon	
Various	March 9, 2016	Digital download	Pony Canyon	

== See also ==
- 1988 in Japanese music
