= Meu amor é... =

1985 single by Akina Nakamori

Single by Akina Nakamori

from the album D404ME
- Language: Japanese
- English title: My Love
- B-side: "Lonely Journey"
- Released: March 8, 1985
- Recorded: 1984
- Genre: J-pop; kayōkyoku; Latin
- Length: 3:53
- Label: Reprise Records
- Composer: Naoya Matsuoka
- Lyricist: Chinfa Kan
- Producer: Yūzō Shimada

Akina Nakamori singles chronology
"Kazari ja Nai no yo Namida wa" (1984)	"Meu amor é..." (1985)	"Akaitori Nigeta" (1985)

Music videos
- "Meu amor é..." (Live) on YouTube

"Meu amor é..." (ミ・アモーレ, Mi Amōre; lit. "My Love is...") (alternatively spelled "Mi Amore") is the 11th single by Japanese entertainer Akina Nakamori. Written by Chinfa Kan and Naoya Matsuoka, the single was released on March 8, 1985, by Warner Pioneer through the Reprise label. It was also the lead single from her eighth studio album D404ME.

== Background ==
"Meu amor é..." was composed by Naoya Matsuoka, a Japanese Latin fusion musician and jazz pianist. The title is Brazilian Portuguese for "My love is...". In addition, the single jacket cover uses the title "Mi Amore", as the song was originally titled with the Spanish word "Mi" and the Italian word "Amore". Nakamori's follow-up single "Akaitori Nigeta" is the original version of the song with completely different lyrics.

Nakamori performed the song on the 36th Kōhaku Uta Gassen, making her third appearance on NHK's New Year's Eve special.

Matsuoka recorded "Meu amor é..." as an instrumental on his 1985 compilation album One Last Farewell: Naoya Matsuoka the Best Selection. Nakamori has re-recorded the song for the 1995 compilation True Album Akina 95 Best and the 2002 self-cover compilation Utahime Double Decade. In 2010, she re-recorded the song for the pachinko machine CR Nakamori Akina: Utahime Densetsu ~Koi Moni Dome nara~ (CR中森明菜・歌姫伝説〜恋も二度目なら〜; CR Akina Nakamori: Utahime Legend ~If Love Is For the Second Time~).

== Chart performance ==
"Meu amor é..." became Nakamori's seventh No. 1 on Oricon's weekly singles chart and sold over 630,700 copies.

== Awards ==
"Meu amor é..." won the Grand Prix at the 27th Japan Record Awards.

== Track listing ==
Original release
No.	Title	Lyrics	Music	Arrangement	Length
1.	"Meu amor é..." (Mi Amōre (ミ・アモーレ; "My Love is..."))	Chinfa Kan	Naoya Matsuoka	Matsuoka	3:53
2.	"Lonely Journey" (Ronrī Jānī (ロンリー・ジャーニー))	EPO	EPO	Nobuyuki Shimizu	4:54
Total length:					8:47

1998 reissue bonus track
No.	Title	Lyrics	Music	Length
3.	"Meu amor é... (Live Version)" ((ミ・アモーレ(LIVE VERSION)))	Kan	Matsuoka

== Charts ==
Chart (1985)	Peak position
Japan (Oricon)	1

== Release history ==
Year	Format(s)	Serial number	Label(s)	Ref.
1985	7inch LP	L-1668	Warner Pioneer	
1988	8cm CD, CT	10SL-140, 10L5-4050	Warner Pioneer	
1998	12cm CD	WPC6-8668	Warner Pioneer	
2008	Digital download	-	Warner Pioneer	
2014	Digital download - remaster	-	Warner Pioneer	

== Nana Katase version ==
"Meu amor é..."

Single by Nana Katase

from the album Extended
- Language: Japanese
- English title: My Love
- Released: March 10, 2004
- Recorded: 2003
- Genre: J-pop; dance-pop
- Length: 4:08
- Label: Avex Trax
- Composer: Naoya Matsuoka
- Lyricist: Chinfa Kan
- Producer: Shōichirō Hirata

Nana Katase singles chronology
"Necessary/Every" (2003)	"Meu amor é..." (2004)	"Kindan no Telepathy" (2004)

Nana Katase covered "Meu amor é..." as her fifth single, released on March 10, 2004, by Avex Trax as the lead single from her second album Extended. It peaked at No. 39 on Oricon's weekly singles chart.

=== Track listing ===
All lyrics are written by Chinfa Kan; all music is composed by Naoya Matsuoka; all music is arranged by Shōichirō Hirata.

CD single
No.	Title	Length
1.	"Meu amor é..." ((ミ・アモーレ; "My Love"))	4:08
2.	"Meu amor é..." (Extended Dance Mix)	5:26
3.	"Meu amor é..." (Instrumental)	4:06
Total length:		13:04

=== Charts ===
Chart (2004)	Peak position
Japan (Oricon)	39

== Other cover versions ==
- Karyudo covered the song in 1996.
- Chemistry covered the song in Nakamori's 2025 tribute album "Nakamori Akina Tribute Album: Meikyo"

== See also ==
- 1985 in Japanese music
