= RC Succession =

Rock band

- Origin: Tokyo, Japan
- Genres: Blues rock; folk rock; glam rock; rhythm and blues
- Years active: 1968–1991
- Labels: Toshiba EMI, Polydor, London, Kitty
- Past members: Kiyoshiro Imawano; Kazuo Kobayashi; Reichi Nakaido; Hirofumi Kasuga; Rei Atsumi; Kenchi Haren; Kozo Niida; Ginji Ogawa; Gee2Woo

RC Succession (Japanese: RCサクセション, Hepburn: Āru Shī Sakuseshon) was a Japanese rock band from Tokyo, formed in 1968. One of Japan's longest-running bands, it went through many line-up changes over the years with front man Kiyoshiro Imawano and bassist Kazuo Kobayashi the only constant members, before disbanding in January 1991.

In 2003, HMV ranked RC Succession at No. 16 on their list of the "Top 100 Japanese Pops Artists". In September 2007, Rolling Stone Japan rated their 1980 live album Rhapsody at No. 2 and their 1988 cover album Covers at No. 41 on its list of the "100 Greatest Japanese Rock Albums of All Time". Covers was named number 1 on Bounce's 2009 list of "54 Standard Japanese Rock Albums".

== History ==
In 1966, Imawano formed a band named the Clover with Kenchi Haren. This band broke up the following year, however, the remaining members added some new members and called it the Remainders of the Clover. This band changed members again in 1968, and this time they were renamed to The Remainders of the Clover Succession. The name was shortened and the band RC Succession was born. The group first started as a Tokyo-based folk trio in 1966 when leader Kiyoshiro Imawano was still in junior high school and playing in a Ventures copy band. The group is hard to classify, but in early years their sound was mostly R&B fashioned music played acoustically. Imawano, however, has quite a distinctive high warbling voice that is not typical of soul singers. More than a singer, he is known as a lyricist for his clever and timely lyrics. RC Succession developed a reputation early on as a strong live band, but did not have a hit record until 1972, and then not again for a long time after that. In the late 70s the group took on a more electric sound, as well as an odd glam influenced look, with Imawano in particular often appearing in loud clothing and heavy makeup. The group became part of a hot late 70s scene which included Yellow Magic Orchestra, The Plastics, and Sandii & The Sunsetz, created when these groups began interacting with foreign bands and releasing internationally. RC Succession did not catch on internationally as much as some of the others.

In 1970, RC Succession made its debut as an acoustic trio of Kiyoshiro Imawano (vo., gt.), Wassho Rinko (another name for Kazuo Kobayashi) (b.) and Kenchi Haren (gt.). After guitarist Reichi "Chabo" Nakaido joined the band in 1978 replacing Haren, their popularity grew as they strengthened their rock and roll sound. Since then, they released series of milestone numbers including "Ameagari no Yozora Ni" (1980) and "Transistor Radio" (1980).

in 1982, the band enter in part of a famous concert in 1982 called "The Day of R&B", which took place at a packed baseball stadium and included as headliners Chuck Berry and Sam Moore of Sam & Dave. The event was filmed and released as a video. Another thing in 1982 that helped establish them as a major act was a collaboration with Ryucihi Sakamoto called "Ikenai Rouge Magic". The single's jacket and promotional picture featured Imawano and Sakamoto kissing - quite a shocker at the time. The song was also used in a popular TV commercial. Among the best-known RC Succession songs are "Ameagari No Yozora Ni" and "Toranjisuta Rajio". RC Succession have often collaborated with other artists, and Imawano marks among the highlights of his career working with his heroes Booker T. & The MG's. RC Succession are also unusual in that for a Japanese pop band they are fairly political and outspoken. They are one of the few Japanese bands that regularly play benefits, and Imawano has spoken out against war, nuclear power and in favor of Tibetan freedom.

In 1988, the band recorded an album consisting of cover versions of rock and pop standards (with original Japanese lyrics) aptly named Covers. It was originally intended for a release from the band's record company Toshiba EMI, however, the release was suddenly canceled with small notice by Toshiba EMI on newspapers claiming "The album was too wonderful to be released." Two months later in August 1988, it was released by Kitty Records. Kiyoshiro revealed that there had been pressure from Toshiba to remove some of the anti-war and anti-nuclear songs from the album. The album gained wide attention due to the incident, and debuted at number one of the Oricon album chart.

Members Gee2Woo (keyboards) and Kozo Niida (drums) left the band in 1990. Kiyoshiro, Nakaido, and Kazuo Kobayashi (bass) released the album Baby a Go-Go that September with former Carmen Maki & Oz member Hirofumi Kasuga on drums. Former Vow Wow keyboardist Rei Atsumi also joined soon after. However, RC Succession held their last concert at the Nippon Budokan on December 25, 1990.

After they stopped performing, Kiyoshiro and Nakaido continued as solo artists, while other members (Kobayashi, Niida, and Gee2Woo) resumed their careers as session players. While the band never played together again, Kiyoshiro and Nakaido kept close relationships and collaborated from time to time, including the 1994 album Glad All Over which was credited to Kiyoshiro Imawano & Reichi Nakaido.

Kiyoshiro died of cancer on May 2, 2009.

== Members ==
- Kiyoshiro Imawano - vocals, guitar (1968–1991)
- Kazuo Kobayashi - bass (1968–1991)
- Reichi Nakaido - lead guitar, vocals (1978–1991)
- Hirofumi Kasuga - guitar, drums (1978, 1990–1991)
- Rei Atsumi - keyboards (1990–1991)

=== Past ===
- Kenchi Haren - guitar (1968–1977)
- Kozo Niida - drums (1978–1990)
- Ginji Ogawa - guitar (1979–1980)
- Gee2Woo - keyboards (1980–1990)

== Discography ==
=== Original albums ===
- 1972 Shoki no RC Succession (Toshiba)
- 1972 Tanoshii Yube Ni (Toshiba)
- 1976 Single Man (Polydor)
- 1980 Rhapsody (Kitty) [live album]
- 1980 Please (Kitty)
- 1981 Blue (Kitty)
- 1982 Beat Pops (London)
- 1983 OK (London)
- 1983 King of Live (London) [live album]
- 1984 Feel So Bad (Toshiba EMI)
- 1985 Heart Ace (Toshiba EMI)
- 1986 the TEARS OF a CLOWN (Toshiba EMI) [live album]
- 1988 Marvy (Toshiba EMI)
- 1988 Covers (Kitty) [cover album]
- 1988 Cobra No Nayami (Toshiba EMI) [live album]
- 1990 Baby a Go Go (Toshiba EMI)

=== Compilations ===
- 1981 EPLP (Toshiba EMI)
- 1984 EPLP-2 (Toshiba EMI)
- 1990 Best of RC Succession 1970-1980 (Toshiba EMI)
- 1990 Best of RC Succession 1981-1990 (Toshiba EMI)
- 2002 Golden Best (EMI Music Japan)
- 2005 Wonderful Days 1970-80 (USM Japan)
- 2005 Greatful Days 1981-90 (USM Japan)
