= Nana Katase =

Japanese actress, singer, and model

- 片瀬 那奈
- Born: November 7, 1981 (age 44); Kōtō, Tokyo, Japan
- Occupations: Actress; singer; fashion model
- Years active: 1998–present
- Notable credit(s): Death Note: The Last Name as Kiyomi Takada, Saikai: Yokota Megumi-san no Negai as Megumi Yokota

Nana Katase (片瀬 那奈, Katase Nana; born November 7, 1981) is a Japanese actress, singer, and fashion model. She is known for acting in Death Note 2: The Last Name (2006), Arakawa Under the Bridge (2010) and 20th Century Boys 1: Beginning of the End (2008).

Katase portrayed Kiyomi Takada in Death Note: The Last Name. She also portrayed Megumi Yokota as an adult (with Mayuko Fukuda who played the role of a younger Megumi Yokota) as one of at least thirteen Japanese citizens kidnapped by North Korea in the late 1970s and early 1980s in Saikai: Yokota Megumi-san no Negai. She also played Mayumi in the fifth installment of the PlayStation series by Sega, Yakuza.

== Filmography ==
=== Films ===
- Between Calmness and Passion (2001)
- Death Note: The Last Name (2006), Kiyomi Takada
- Calling You (2007), Ryo Harada
- 20th Century Boys 1: Beginning of the End (2008), Mika Shikishima
- 20th Century Boys 2: The Last Hope (2009), Mika Shikishima
- 20th Century Boys 3: Redemption (2009), Mika Shikishima
- Trick The Movie: Psychic Battle Royale (2010)
- Saibancho! Koko wa Choeki 4 nen de Dodesuka (2010), Prosecutor Mari Hasebe
- Gene Waltz (2011), Miki Tanaka
- Arakawa Under the Bridge (2012), Maria
- Ushijima the Loan Shark (2012), Chiaki Okubo
- Hentai Kamen (2013)
- Hentai Kamen: Abnormal Crisis (2016)
- I Am a Hero (2016), Tekko

=== TV dramas ===
- Great Teacher Onizuka Special as Yamaguchi Rika (Fuji TV, 1999)
- Tengoku no Kissa (TV Asahi, 1999)
- Koori no Sekai (Fuji TV, 1999)
- Hanamura Daisuke (Fuji TV, 2000, episode 7)
- Shinjuku Boso Kyukyutai (NTV, 2000)
- 2001 no otoko un (Fuji TV, 2001)
- Dekichatta Kekkon (Fuji TV, 2001)
- Pretty Girls (TBS, 2002)
- Kochira Hon Ikegami Sho 2 (TBS, 2003, episode 2)
- Last Christmas (TBS, 2004)
- Fukigen na Gene (Fuji TV, 2005, episodes 4-5, 7)
- Rikon Bengoshi 2 (Fuij TV, 2005)
- Jukunen Rikon (TV Asahi, 2005)
- Kobayakawa Nobuki no Koi (Fuji TV, 2006)
- Saikai (NTV, 2006)
- Teppan Shoujo Akane!! (TBS, 2006)
- Sennyu Keiji Ranbo 2 (NTV, 2007)
- Jigoku no Sata mo Yome Shidai (TBS, 2007)
- Abarenbo Mama (Fuji TV, 2007)
- Inochi no Iro Enpitsu (TV Asahi, 2007)
- Miracle Voice (TBS, 2008)
- Average (Fuji TV, 2008)
- Hokaben (NTV, 2008, episode 7)
- Average 2 (Fuji TV, 2008)
- Bloody Monday (TBS, 2008)
- Uta no Onii-san (TV Asahi, 2009)
- Choshokutei (WOWOW, 2009)
- Ghost Friends (NHK, 2009)
- Koi no Kara Sawagi Drama Special Love Stories VI (NTV, 2009)
- Naka nai to Kimeta Hi (Fuji TV, 2010)
- Pro Golfer Hana (NTV, 2010)
- Hammer Session! (TBS, 2010, episode 8)
- Yamikin Ushijima-kun (TBS, 2010)
- Diplomat Kuroda Kosaku (Fuji TV, 2011)
- Ikemen desu ne (TBS, 2011)
- Arakawa Under the Bridge (TBS, 2011)
- Kaeru no Oujo-sama (Fuji TV, 2012)

=== Video games ===
- Yakuza 5 (2012), Mayumi

== Discography ==
=== Singles ===
- 2002: Galaxy/Telepathy/Fantasy
- 2003: Babe
- 2003: Shine/Revenge
- 2003: Necessary/Every
- 2004: Meu amor é...
- 2004: Kindan no Telepathy

=== Albums ===
- 2003: Telepathy
- 2004: Extended
- 2005: Reloaded: Perfect Singles

=== DVD ===
- 2005: Reloaded: Perfect Visuals
