= Saigo no Iiwake =

Single by Hideaki Tokunaga

from the album Realize
- Language: Japanese
- English title: Last Excuse
- B-side: "Ima wa Sayonara Dake wo Iukedo"
- Released: October 25, 1988
- Recorded: 1988
- Genre: J-pop; kayōkyoku
- Length: 11:24
- Label: Apollon
- Composer: Hideaki Tokunaga
- Lyricist: Keiko Asō

Hideaki Tokunaga singles chronology
"Kaze no Eolia" (1988)	"Saigo no Iiwake" (1988)	"Koibito" (1989)

Music video
- Saigo no Iiwake on YouTube

"Saigo no Iiwake" (最後の言い訳; lit. 'Last Excuse') is the sixth single by Japanese singer-songwriter Hideaki Tokunaga. Written by Tokunaga and Keiko Asō, the single was released through Apollon on October 25, 1988.

== Background ==
Tokunaga co-wrote "Saigo no Iiwake" after experiencing a painful breakup with someone he was dating at the time. As a result of the breakup, he involuntarily shed tears while performing the song on the TBS music show The Best Ten.

The song was used as the opening theme of the Kansai TV/Fuji TV drama series Naokishō Sakka Suspense (直木賞作家サスペンス; Naoki Prize Writer Suspense). It was also featured in the 1993 film Tora-san's Matchmaker.

The song is included in Tokunaga's compilation albums Single Collection (1986~1991) (1998), Beautiful Ballade (2006), Singles Best (2008), Vocalist & Ballade Best (2011), and All Time Best Presence (2016). Tokunaga re-recorded the song in the albums Self Cover Best ~ Kagayaki Nagara~ (2003) and Eien no Hateni ~ Self Cover Best I ~ (2018).

== Chart performance ==
"Saigo no Iiwake" reached number 4 on Oricon's singles chart, number 100 on Oricon's 1988 year-ending chart and number 69 on Oricon's 1989 year-ending chart.

== Track listing ==
All music is composed by Hideaki Tokunaga.

No.	Title	Lyrics	Length
1.	"Saigo no Iiwake (最後の言い訳; "Last Excuse")"	Keiko Asō	6:17
2.	"Ima wa Sayonara Dake wo Iukedo (今はさよならだけを言うけど; "Right Now, I Just Say Goodbye")"	Hideaki Tokunaga	4:47
Total length:			11:24

== Chart position ==
Charts (1988)	Peak position
Japanese Oricon Singles Chart	4

== Cover versions ==
"Saigo no Iiwake" has been covered in Japan by Midori Karashima, Satoshi Furuya, Ruru Honda, and Junko Yamamoto.

The song also achieved popularity in the Philippines, where it was recorded in several adaptations: Ted Ito released Ikaw Pa Rin, Keempee de Leon performed My One and Only, and Maso produced both Kailanman in Tagalog and Come Back Home in English. Additionally, saxophonist Jake Concepcion issued an instrumental version.

== See also ==
- 1988 in Japanese music
