= Again (Shizuka Kudo song) =

Single by Shizuka Kudo

from the album Mysterious
- Released: December 2, 1987
- Genre: Pop
- Length: 4:15
- Label: Pony Canyon
- Songwriters: Yasushi Akimoto; Tsugutoshi Gotō
- Producer: Tsugutoshi Gotō

Shizuka Kudo singles chronology
"Kindan no Telepathy" (1987)	"Again" (1987)	"Daite Kuretara Ii no ni" (1988)

Audio sample
- file; help

"Again" is a song recorded by Japanese singer Shizuka Kudo for her debut solo studio album, Mysterious. Pony Canyon released the track as the second single from Mysterious on December 2, 1987, in both 12-inch vinyl and maxi single format.

== Background ==
"Again" was Kudo's first solo release following the disbandment of the idol girl group Onyanko Club, which she joined in 1986. The song was the ending theme for the CX teen drama and variety television series Momoiro Gakuen Toshi Sengen!!, of which Kudo herself was a cast member.

== Composition ==
"Again" was put together by the same songwriting duo as Kudo's debut single: it was written by Yasushi Akimoto and composed, arranged and produced by Tsugutoshi Gotō. The song is composed in the key of E minor and set to a tempo of 140 beats per minute. Kudo's vocals span one octave, from B_{3} to B_{4}. Lyrically, the song talks about a woman breaking off a romantic relationship because of her feelings of inadequacy.

== Critical reception ==
The song is described by CDJournal as a bouncy midtempo track with a funky and unusually complicated melody line for an idol singer's second single. Kudo was praised for matching the song with an effortless vocal performance, and for showcasing potential for breaking out of the idol mold.

== Chart performance ==
The single debuted at number three on the Oricon Singles Chart, selling 61,000 copies in its first week. It dropped to number seven the following week, with 20,000 copies sold. "Again" stayed in the top 100 for a total of twelve weeks and ranked number 53 on the year-end Oricon Singles Chart for 1987.

== Track listing ==
All music is composed by Tsugutoshi Gotō.

12" vinyl
No.	Title	Lyrics	Arranger(s)	Length
1.	"Again"	Yasushi Akimoto	Tsugutoshi Gotō	4:15
2.	"If"	Yoshiko Miura	Gotō	3;48
Total length:				8:03

Maxi single
No.	Title	Lyrics	Arranger(s)	Length
3.	"Ai ga Itai Yoru" (愛が痛い夜 "Nights When Love Hurts")	Akimoto	Gotō	4:05
Total length:				12:08

== Charts ==
Chart (1987–88)	Peak position	Sales
Japan Weekly Singles (Oricon)	3	159,000
Japan Monthly Singles (Oricon)	4	159,000
Japan Yearly Singles (Oricon)	53	159,000

== See also ==
- 1987 in Japanese music
