= Realize (album) =

Studio album by Hideaki Tokunaga
- Released: 21 May 1989
- Genre: J-pop; kayōkyoku
- Length: 51:00
- Language: Japanese; English
- Label: Apollon

Hideaki Tokunaga chronology
Dear (1988)	Realize (1989)	Hideaki Tokunaga Live (1990)

Singles from REALIZE
- 1. "Saigo no Iiwake" Released: 25 October 1988; 2. "Koibito" Released: 21 April 1989; 3. "Myself ~Kaze ni Naritai~ / Kokoro no Ball" Released: 21 September 1989

Realize (リアライズ, Riaraizu) is the fifth studio album by Japanese singer/songwriter Hideaki Tokunaga. Released on May 21, 1989, the album sold over 300,000 copies and peaked at No. 4 in Oricon's albums chart and was ranked at No. 46 in Oricon's 1989 year-ending album chart. It was also certified Gold by the RIAJ.

The album features the singles "Saigo no Iiwake", "Koibito", and "Myself ~Kaze ni Naritai~" / "Kokoro no Ball". The English-language song "You're in the Sky ~Eolia~" was used for TV commercials promoting Panasonic's Eolia air conditioner line.

== Track listing ==
All music is composed by Hideaki Tokunaga and arranged by Ichizo Seo.

No.	Title	Lyrics	Length
1.	"Kimi no Ao" ((君の青; "Your Blue"))	Hitoshi Shinohara	5:37
2.	"Nemurenai Yoru" ((眠れない夜; "Sleepless Nights"))	Hideaki Tokunaga	4:21
3.	"Lovers" (Rabāzu (ラバーズ))	Shinohara	4:26
4.	"You're in the Sky ~Eolia~"	Machiko Ryū	5:35
5.	"Soshite Hoshi ni Natta yo" ((そして星になったよ; "And It Became a Star"))	Tokunaga	4:45
6.	"Koibito" ((恋人; "Lovers"))	Tokunaga	4:54
7.	"Cobalt ni Kieta Blue" (Kobaruto ni Kieta Burū (コバルトに消えたブルー; "The Blue Disappeared into the Cobalt"))	Keiko Asō	4:52
8.	"Myself ~Kaze ni Naritai~" (Maiserufu ~Kaze ni Naritai~ (MYSELF 〜風になりたい〜; "Myself ~I Want to Be the Wind~"))	Akira Ohtsu	5:51
9.	"Saigo no Iiwake (Los Angeles Mix)" ((最後の言い訳; "Last Excuse"))	Asō	6:28
10.	"Boku no Tokei" ((僕の時計; "My Watch"))	Shinohara	4:12

== Personnel ==
- Keyboards: Ryoichi Kuniyoshi, Yu Toyama, and Nobuo Kurata
- Bass: Chiharu Mikuzuki
- Drums: Hideo Yamaki, Toru Hasebe
- Guitar: Tsuyoshi Ima, Masaki Matsubara, and Jun Kakuda
- Saxophone: Jake H. Conception
- Manipulator: Nobuhiko Nakayama, Keiji Urata, and Jun Toyama
- Chorus: Takafumi Hiyama, Yasuhiro Kido, and Junko Hirotani

== Charts ==
Chart (1989)	Peak position
Japanese Oricon Albums Chart	4

== Certification ==
Region	Certification	Certified units/sales
Japan (RIAJ)	Gold	200,000^{^}
^{^} Shipments figures based on certification alone.

== See also ==
- 1989 in Japanese music
