= Hyper Psychic Geo Garaga =

1989 Japanese animated science fiction film

Garaga
- ギャラガ HYPER-PSYCHIC-GEO GARAGA
- Directed by: Hidemi Kubo
- Screenplay by: Hidemi Kubo
- Based on: Wakusei Garaga by Satomi Mikuriya
- Music by: Tatsumi Yano
- Production company: Aubec
- Distributed by: Asmik
- Release date: October 21, 1989 (Japan)
- Running time: 100 minutes
- Country: Japan
- Language: Japanese

Garaga (ギャラガ, Gyaraga), also known as Hyper Psychic Geo Garaga, is a 1989 Japanese science fiction anime film directed and written by Hidemi Kubo. It is based on Wakusei Garaga (Planet Garaga), a manga by Satomi Mikuriya. The 100-minute film was distributed theatrically in Japan by Asmik on 21 October 1989. Its story follows the survivors of a spacecraft crash on a remote planet, where they become involved in a conflict between an indigenous telepathic people and forces seeking to conquer the planet.

== Plot ==
In the year 2755, humans travel between star systems using warp gates created from black holes, including a gate called God's Ring. During a voyage through one of these gates, the cargo ship XeBeC is sabotaged, forcing its crew and two passengers to evacuate. Their shuttle crashes in the jungle of the planet Garaga. The survivors encounter hostile, armed ape-like beings, one of which is found to have undergone biological and cybernetic modifications. Jay, a member of the ship's crew, also receives telepathic assistance from Farah, a member of the planet's indigenous Ra people.

One of the passengers, Heran, is the daughter of General Yang, a military commander in the Federation Government. Yang had considered colonizing Garaga but changed his plans after learning that the Ra lived there. His android assistant, Alf Dorf, has manipulated him into attacking the Ra, using the altered ape-like beings to make the Ra appear responsible for the violence. Dorf's wider aim is to eliminate organic life and establish robotic rule across the galaxy. The conflict involves several groups with concealed identities and competing objectives; Farah also faces betrayal within her own people.

Dorf eventually attempts to destroy Garaga using the weapons of an orbiting space station. Jay, Farah and Jay's robot pursue him. Although Dorf is defeated, he manages to activate the weapons. Farah draws upon the combined telepathic power of the Ra to stop the attack and save the planet.

== Production and release ==
The film was adapted from Satomi Mikuriya's manga Wakusei Garaga. Alongside Kubo's direction and screenplay, the production credits include Moriyasu Taniguchi as character designer and animation director, Mitsuharu Miyamae as art director, and Tatsumi Yano as composer. The film was produced by AVN and Asmik, with animation production by Aubec.

Garaga was originally planned as a low-budget original video animation (OVA) before becoming a theatrical release. Although The Encyclopedia of Science Fiction describes Garaga as an OVA, the Japanese Media Arts Database classifies it as a theatrical anime film, while Eiga.com documents its theatrical release on 21 October 1989.

Following its Japanese theatrical release on 21 October 1989, Garaga was issued on home video. The National Diet Library records a Japanese DVD edition released in March 2002. In the United States, U.S. Manga Corps distributed the film on VHS and Region 1 DVD.

== Voice cast ==
The Japanese voice cast includes:

- Toshio Furukawa as Jay M. Jay
- Michie Tomizawa as Heran
- Keiko Han as Farah
- Akira Kamiya as Onboo
- Ichirō Nagai as Bōji
- Kenichi Ogata as Neiham
- Osamu Kobayashi as General Yang
- Norio Wakamoto as Alf Dorf

== Reception ==
Carlos/Giancarla Ross, reviewing the Japanese-language version for THEM Anime Reviews, praised the film's shifting alliances, characters with hidden motives, and science-fiction ideas, including suspended animation and biological engineering. Ross found the action scenes more fluidly animated than the rest of the film, but criticized its dated visuals, music and hurried ending, arguing that the complicated plot left insufficient room to develop the characters' motivations. The reviewer awarded the anime 3 out of 5 stars, calling it a "very decent" production.

Writing in The Encyclopedia of Science Fiction in 2021, Steven Pearce likewise noted the film's many factions and concealed identities. Pearce criticized the dialogue in the English dub, while suggesting that the Japanese original might have been more thoughtful. He also commented on the substantial number of female characters, several of whom were more independently characterized than Heran, whom the reviewer criticized as a typical damsel in distress.

Film critic Grant Watson gave a more negative assessment in a 2024 review for his review website FictionMachine. He criticized the screenplay for continually introducing new opponents and plot twists without developing them effectively. Watson also found the character designs and animation poor, particularly in comparison with his expectations for a theatrically released film. Watson attributed some of the film's shortcomings to its origins as a low-budget OVA that was reworked for theatrical release, arguing that its animation remained inadequate for the cinema. He dismissed the resulting film as "absolute bottom of the barrel stuff".
