= Yume wo Shinjite =

Single by Hideaki Tokunaga
- Language: Japanese
- B-side: "Lovers"
- Released: January 16, 1990
- Recorded: 1989
- Genre: J-pop; kayōkyoku
- Length: 4:48
- Label: Apollon
- Composer: Hideaki Tokunaga
- Lyricist: Hitoshi Shinohara

Hideaki Tokunaga singles chronology
"Myself: Kaze ni Naritai / Kokoro no Ball" (1989)	"Yume wo Shinjite" (1990)	"Kowarekake no Radio" (1990)

"Yume wo Shinjite" (夢を信じて; lit. 'Believe in Your Dreams') is the ninth single of Hideaki Tokunaga, which was released on January 16, 1990. The song was the ending song of the first 26 episodes of the anime television series Dragon Quest: Legend of the Hero Abel, a loose adaptation of the hit video game Dragon Quest III.

The song peaked No. 3 on Oricon's weekly singles chart, and ranked first in the annual chart of the radio show "Ten Best National Songs". The single was originally planned for release on January 15, but since that day was the Japanese holiday Coming of Age Day, the release was postponed until January 16 because of fears that primary school children who are Dragon Quest fans would overwhelm record stores.

The song was included in a 2011 charity album produced in the aftermath of the 2011 Tōhoku earthquake and tsunami.

== Track listing ==
All lyrics are written by Hitoshi Shinohara; all music is composed by Hideaki Tokunaga.

No.	Title	Length
1.	"Yume wo Shinjite (夢を信じて; "Believe in Your Dreams")"	4:48
2.	"Lovers (ラバーズ, Rabāzu)"	4:24
Total length:		9:18

== Cover versions ==
- Hiroko Moriguchi covered the song on her 2023 album Anison Covers.

== See also ==
- 1990 in Japanese music
