= 27th Japan Record Awards =

1985 Japanese music awards ceremony

- Date: 31 December 1985
- Venue: Nippon Budokan, Tokyo
- Hosted by: Takero Morimoto, Chieko Baisho

Television/radio coverage
- Network: TBS

The 27th Annual Japan Record Awards took place at the Nippon Budokan in Chiyoda, Tokyo, 31 December 1985, starting at 6:30PM JST. The primary ceremonies were televised in Japan on TBS.

The audience rating was 31.4%.

== Award winners ==
- Japan Record Award:
  - Akina Nakamori for "Meu amor é..."
    - 1st runner-up: The Checkers for ジュリアに傷心
    - 2nd runner-up: Anzen Chitai for 悲しみにさよなら
- Best Vocalist:
  - Sayuri Ishikawa
- Best Star:
  - The Checkers
- Best New Artist:
  - Miho Nakayama
- Best Album:
  - Yōsui Inoue for "9.5 Carats"

== See also ==
- 1985 in Japanese music
