= Kiyoshiro Imawano =

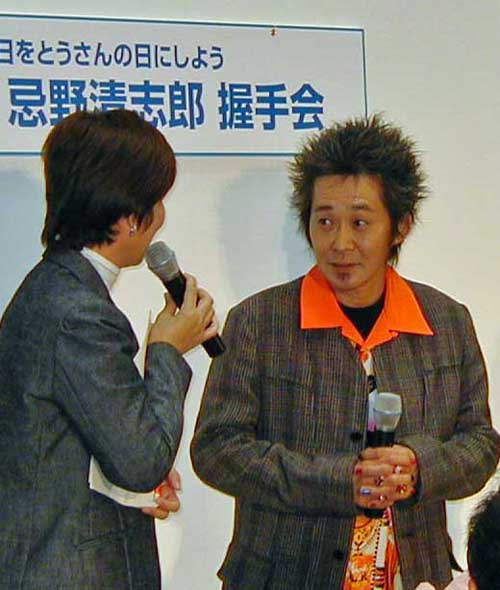
- Kiyoshiro Imawano (2003)

Background information
- Birth name: Kiyoshi Kurihara
- Born: April 2, 1951; Nakano, Tokyo, Japan
- Died: May 2, 2009 (aged 58)
- Genres: Rock, R&B, Folk rock
- Occupation(s): Singer, musician
- Instrument(s): Vocals; Guitars; Harmonica
- Years active: 1966–2009
- Labels: Toshiba EMI, Polydor Japan, Universal Music Japan, Swim Records, avex io, Warner Music Japan
- Website: kiyoshiro.co.jp

Kiyoshiro Imawano (忌野 清志郎, Imawano Kiyoshirō), born Kiyoshi Kurihara (栗原 清志, Kurihara Kiyoshi; April 2, 1951 – May 2, 2009), was a Japanese rock musician, lyricist, composer, musical producer, and actor from Tokyo, Japan. He was dubbed "Japan's King of Rock". He formed and led the influential rock band RC Succession. He wrote many anti-nuclear songs following the Chernobyl disaster in 1986. He was known for pioneering the adoption of linguistic characteristics of the Japanese language into his songs.

== Biography ==
Kiyoshiro was born in Nakano, Tokyo, Japan in 1951. While in high school, he formed a cover band named the Clovers in 1966. The band dissolved a year later, and he then formed RC Succession in 1968, which debuted on the music scene in 1970.

In 1982, Kiyoshiro collaborated with Ryuichi Sakamoto and released the single "Ikenai Rouge Magic" which became a top hit on the Oricon chart.

After RC Succession ceased to perform and record in 1991, Kiyoshiro continued as a solo singer. He recorded and performed under various unit names apart from his own such as Danger, Razor Sharp, HIS, 2 3's, Ruffy Tuffy, Mitsukiyo and Screaming Revue. With groups the Timers and Love Jets, Kiyoshiro remained anonymous using pseudonyms and fictitious characters.

In 1992, he released the album Memphis which was recorded in Memphis with Booker T. & the M.G.'s. At the time of the recording, he received an honorary citizenship from the Mayor of Memphis. Following the release of the album, Kiyoshiro toured Japan with the M.G.'s, and the Budokan concert of that tour was released on the live album Have Mercy!.

Kiyoshiro also dubbed the voice of the Lord Royal Highness of Atlantis in the Japanese version of "SpongeBob's Atlantis SquarePantis" on Nickelodeon Japan Channel. (However, on NHK Educational TV he is voiced by voice actor Yoshito Yasuhara instead.)

On July 3, 2006, Kiyoshiro confessed on his official website that he was diagnosed with throat cancer and canceled all the concerts to focus on the treatment. He made a comeback in January the following year announcing that he won the battle with cancer, however, it was revealed in July that it had spread to the left ilium, resulting in a cancellation of all shows again.

=== Death ===
On May 2, 2009, Kiyoshiro died of cancer. His funeral took place at Aoyama Sougisho on May 9, 2009. Approximately 42,000 fans visited to bid farewell, the same amount that attended Hibari Misora's funeral held at the same place. The funeral ceremony was titled The Aoyama Rock n' Roll Show and Kiyoshiro's band played in front of 1,000 people including Keisuke Kuwata, Shinobu Otake, Naoto Takenaka.

== Posthumous release ==
On June 17, 2009, the single "Oh! Radio" which is said to be Kiyoshiro's last recorded work was released. This song was written by Kiyoshiro as the campaign song for the Osaka radio station FM802 and originally sung by Shikao Suga and Shigeru Kishida of Quruli under the unit name of Radio Soul 20. The version sung by Kiyoshiro was recorded all by himself (playing guitar, bass, drums and harmonica) at his studio "Rock n' Roll Kenkyujo" sometime in early 2009, and was intended as a demo. It was first made public at his funeral, and it was decided to be released following the overwhelming demand from the fans.

== Memorial concert ==
Because Kiyoshiro was a popular performer at Japan's Fuji Rock Festival, there was a major tribute concert to his life and work held at Fuji Rock 2009, which was held two months after his death in July 2009. The Fuji Rock tribute featured many famous Japanese and international artists speaking about Imawano and singing either his songs or their own in memory of him. Some of the artists performing at the memorial included: Chara, UA, Booker T. Jones, Steve Cropper, Leyona, Hiroto Kōmoto, Masatoshi Mashima, Tortoise Matsumoto, Hamazaki Takashi, YO-KING, Char, Reichi Nakaido, Wilko Johnson, Norman Watt-Roy, and Shigeru Izumiya.

== Discography ==
For RC Succession discography, please see RC Succession discography

- 1982 Dr. Umezu & Kiyoshiro / Danger
- 1985 Danger II
- 1987 Razor Sharp
- 1987 Kiyoshiro Imawano & The Razor Sharp / Happy Heads
- 1989 The Timers / The Timers
- 1991 HIS / Nippon no Hito (unit with Haruomi Hosono and Fuyumi Sakamoto)
- 1992 Memphis
- 1992 Kiyoshiro Imawano + Booker T. & the M.G.'s / Have Mercy!
- 1992 Kiyoshiro Imawano & 2 3's / Go Go 2 3's
- 1993 Kiyoshiro Imawano & 2 3's / Music From Power House
- 1994 Magic
- 1994 Kiyoshiro Imawano & Reichi Nakaido / Glad All Over
- 1995 The Timers / Fukkatsu!! The Timers
- 1995 The Timers / Fujimi no Timers
- 1997 Kiyoshiro meets de-ga-show / Hospital
- 1997 Kiyoshiro Imawano Little Screaming Revue / Groovin' Time
- 1998 Kiyoshiro Imawano Little Screaming Revue / Rainbow Cafe
- 1999 Ruffy Tuffy
- 1999 Kiyoshiro Imawano Little Screaming Revue / Fuyu no Jujika
- 2000 Ruffy Tuffy / Natsu no Jujika
- 2000 Ruffy Tuffy / Aki no Jujika
- 2003 Love Jets / Chinguro
- 2003 King
- 2005 God
- 2006 Yumesuke
- 2008 Kanzen Fukkatsusai – Nippon Budokan Live Album
- 2008 Wanted Tour 2003–2004
- 2009 Aoyama Rock'n'Roll Show 2009.5.9 Original Soundtrack
- 2010 Baby #1

== Filmography ==
- 1986 Death Powder ... Dr. Loo
- 2001 The Happiness of the Katakuris ... Richard Sagawa
- 2002 Chicken Heart ... Sada
- 2002 "Power and Terror: Noam Chomsky in Our Times"
- 2003 1980
- 2004 Otakus in Love
- 2005 The Great Yokai War ... General Nurarihyon
- 2008 Then Summer Came
