= Extended (Nana Katase album) =

Studio album by Nana Katase
- Released: April 21, 2004
- Recorded: 2003
- Genre: J-pop; dance-pop
- Length: 34:31
- Language: Japanese
- Label: Avex Trax
- Producer: Shōichirō Hirata

Nana Katase chronology
Telepathy (2003)	Extended (2004)	Reloaded: Perfect Singles (2005)

Singles from Extended
- 1. "Meu amor é..." Released: March 10, 2004; 2. "Kindan no Telepathy" Released: March 31, 2004

Extended (エクステンデッド, Ekusutendeddo) is the second and final studio album by Japanese entertainer Nana Katase. Released by Avex Trax on April 21, 2004, the album features covers of seven popular J-pop songs from the 1980s. It was released in two editions: CD only and CD with DVD.

The album peaked at No. 24 on Oricon's weekly albums chart.

== Track listing ==
CD
No.	Title	Lyrics	Music	Original artist	Length
1.	"Meu amor é..." (Mi Amōre (ミ・アモーレ))	Chinfa Kan	Naoya Matsuoka	Akina Nakamori	4:08
2.	"Samishii Nettaigyo" ((淋しい熱帯魚, "Lonely Tropical Fish"))	Neko Oikawa	Masaya Ozeki	Wink	5:01
3.	"Tango Noir"	Kayako Fuyumori	Takashi Tsushimi	Akina Nakamori	5:46
4.	"Rock'n Rouge"	Takashi Matsumoto	Tsushimi	Seiko Matsuda	3:53
5.	"C-Girl"	Yukinojo Mori	Nobody	Yui Asaka	4:47
6.	"Kindan no Telepathy" (Kindan no Terepashī (禁断のテレパシー, "Forbidden Telepathy"))	Yasushi Akimoto	Tsugutoshi Gotō	Shizuka Kudo	4:11
7.	"Kogarashi ni Dakarete" ((木枯しに抱かれて, "Embraced by the Dry Wind"))	Toshihiko Takamizawa	Takamizawa	Kyōko Koizumi	6:45
Total length:					34:31

DVD
No.	Title	Length
1.	"Meu amor é..." (Music Video)
2.	"Kindan no Telepathy" (Music Video)
3.	"Special Interview"

== Charts ==
Chart (2004)	Peak position
Japanese Albums (Oricon)	24
