= Hideaki Tokunaga =

Japanese singer-songwriter and composer (1961-)

Hideaki Tokunaga 德永 英明
- Born: February 27, 1961 (age 65); Yanagawa, Fukuoka, Japan
- Genres: J-pop; kayōkyoku
- Occupations: Singer; songwriter
- Years active: 1986–present
- Labels: Apollon (1986–1997); King Records (1998–2001); A&M Records/Universal Music Japan (2002–present)
- Website: www.tokunagaandtonys.com

Hideaki Tokunaga (德永 英明, Tokunaga Hideaki; born February 27, 1961 in Yanagawa, Fukuoka) is a Japanese pop singer-songwriter.

Although Tokunaga failed to pass the test of Star Tanjō! in 1982, he debuted as a recording singer in 1986. After he released hit songs such as "Yume o Shinjite" (the first ending theme of the anime series Dragon Quest) and "Kowarekake no Radio" in 1990, his single "Wednesday Moon" reached No. 1 on Oricon weekly charts in 1991. He was also known for Vocalist album series, comprising his covers of female songs. Vocalist, Vocalist 2, Vocalist 3 and Vocalist 4 were released in 2005, 2006, 2007 and 2010 respectively.

Tokunaga is the first male artist to have at least one album to reach the number-one position on the Japanese Oricon weekly charts for four decades (1980s, 1990s, 2000s and 2010s).

Tokunaga also composed other singers' songs such as KinKi Kids' "Eien Ni" (from their 2007 album Phi).

Tokunaga gained high popularity in Hong Kong due to huge number of songs covered in Cantonese version by superstars such as Alan Tam, Leslie Cheung, Jackie Cheung, and Leon Lai.

== Career ==
Tokunaga took part in the Japanese television program Star Tanjō! in 1982. The program produced many Japanese stars such as Momoe Yamaguchi, Pink Lady and Akina Nakamori. However, Akiko Matsumoto passed the test at that time, while Tokunaga and Minako Honda were rejected.

On January 21, 1986, Tokunaga debuted with the album Girl and the single "Rainy Blue". In 1987, his third studio album Birds reached the number-one position on the Japanese Oricon charts. Revolution from 1991 had been his last number-one album until 2007.

In the early 1990s, the song "Saigo no Iiwake" (最後の言い訳; lit. "Last Excuse") from Tokunaga's 1989 album Realize became well-known in the Philippines, when it was covered by Ted Ito as "Ikaw Pa Rin", Keempee de Leon as "My One and Only", Maso as "Kailanman", and as an instrumental by saxophonist Jake Concepcion.

Tokunaga began to release the Vocalist album series, in which he covered many Japanese songs of female singers. On September 14, 2005, he released the album Vocalist, the first work of the series. The album includes his cover versions of Miyuki Nakajima's 1975 song "Jidai" and Momoe Yamaguchi's 1977 song "Cosmos". Vocalist was certified Million by RIAJ for shipment of 1,000,000 copies.

On August 30, 2006, Tokunaga released Vocalist 2. The album includes his cover versions of Akina Nakamori's 1982 song "Second Love" and Mika Nakashima's 2003 song "Yuki no Hana". Vocalist 2 was certified Triple Platinum by RIAJ for shipment of 750,000 copies.

On August 15, 2007, Tokunaga released Vocalist 3, which includes his cover versions of Akiko Kobayashi's 1985 song "Koi ni Ochite -Fall in Love-" and Every Little Thing's 1998 song "Time Goes By". His cover version of Namie Amuro's 1997 song "Can You Celebrate?" was the final track of the album, but there was also a first press limited edition which included a bonus track, his cover version of Naomi Chiaki's 1972 song "Kassai". Vocalist 3 reached the number-one position on the Oricon weekly album charts, making it his first number-one album in 15 years 10 months. Vocalist 3 topped the Oricon weekly album charts for two weeks. The album was certified Million by RIAJ for shipment of 1,000,000 copies.

On November 1, 2007, Tokunaga also covered Noriko Awaya's "Wakare no Blues" at the Tokyo International Forum as a part of Ryoichi Hattori's 100th Anniversary Concert.

On May 6, 2009, Tokunaga released his studio album We All. The album debuted at No. 1 on the Oricon weekly album charts. With the album, he became the first solo male artist who debuted in 1980s to have at least one studio album to top the Oricon weekly charts for three decades (1980s, 1990s and 2000s).

Tokunaga released the single "Toki no Nagare ni Mi wo Makase" on March 31, 2010. It was his cover version of Teresa Teng's 1986 song and its B-sides were his cover versions of Seiko Matsuda's 1982 song "Akai Sweet Pea" and Juju's 2009 song "Yasashisa de Afureru Yō ni." Those songs were included by the album Vocalist 4, released on April 20, 2010. The album included his cover version of Hikaru Utada's 1999 song "First Love." Vocalist 4 debuted at No. 1 on the Oricon weekly charts. Because of the album, he became the first male artist to have at least one album to top the Oricon weekly charts for four decades.

=== Health issues ===
In May 2001, Tokunaga cancelled his concert tour after being diagnosed with moyamoya disease. He returned to performing live shows in November 2002 after one and a half years of treatment and recovery. On February 22, 2016, Tokunaga underwent bypass surgery to prevent cerebral infarction. On July 15, Tokunaga was forced to postpone several dates on his 30th anniversary concert tour when he was diagnosed with acute laryngo pharyngitis after experiencing a sore throat following a show in Kobe.

On September 4, 2018, Tokunaga was hospitalized after experiencing dizzy spells while talking to his staff at his office. He was diagnosed with a light stroke caused by dehydration and was confined for a week, resulting in the postponement of four concerts in his schedule.

== Discography ==
Studio albums

- Girl (1986)
- Radio (1986)
- Birds (1987)
- Dear (1988)
- Realize (1989)
- Justice (1990)
- Revolution (1991)
- Nostalgia (1993)
- Taiyō no Shōnen (1995)
- Bless (1997)
- Honesto (1999)
- Remind (2000)
- Ai wo Kudasai (2003)
- My Life (2004)
- Vocalist (2005)
- Vocalist 2 (2006)
- Vocalist 3 (2007)
- We All (2009)
- Vocalist 4 (2010)
- Vocalist Vintage (2012)
- Statement (2013)
- Vocalist 6 (2015)
- Baton (2017)
- Love Person (2021)

== Videography ==
=== VHS ===
- Live Special Vol. 1: Dear (1988)
- Live Special Vol. 2: Sound Shower Sincerely (1988)
- Myself Vol. 1 (1989)
- Myself Vol. 2 (1989)
- Revolution on Film (1992)
- Kaikisen (1992)
- The End of A (1994)

=== DVD/Blu-ray ===
- Live and Clip Track (2000)
- 2001 to 2003: Bokura no Yume wa Ima Hajimatta Bakari (2003)
- Vocalist Tracks (2005)
- Beautiful Clips (2006)
- Beautiful Lives (2007)
- Tabi no Okurimono 0:00 Hatsu (2007)
- Yakushiji Live (2008)
- Vocalist & Songs ~ 1000th Memorial Live (2008)
- Concert Tour '08-'09 Singles Best (2009)
- A Day of Red Sun VII (2010)
- Concert Tour 2009 (2010)
- 2009 Live Special Edition (2010)
- Perfect Clips -Vocalist & Songs- (2011)
- Concert Tour 2010: Vocalist & Songs 2 (2011)
- 25th Anniversary Concert Tour 2011: Vocalist & Ballade Best Final [Perfect Edition] (2012)
- Concert Tour 2012: Vocalist Vintage & Songs (2013)
- Concert Tour 2013: Statement (2014)
- Concert Tour 2015: Vocalist & Songs 3 (2016)
- Perfect Clips ~1986-2016~ (2016)
- 30th Anniversary Concert Tour 2016: All Time Best Presence (2017)
- Concert Tour 2017: Baton (2018)
- Concert Tour 2018: Eien no Hate ni (2019)
