= Koi Hitoyo =

Single by Shizuka Kudo

from the album Joy
- Released: December 28, 1988
- Genre: Pop
- Length: 4:32
- Label: Pony Canyon
- Songwriters: Gorō Matsui; Tsugutoshi Gotō
- Producer: Tsugutoshi Gotō

Shizuka Kudo singles chronology
"Mugon... Iroppoi" (1988)	"Koi Hitoyo" (1988)	"Arashi no Sugao" (1989)

Audio sample
- "Koi Hitoyo": file; help

"Koi Hitoyo" (恋一夜(こいひとよ); lit. "Love All Night") is a song recorded by Japanese singer Shizuka Kudo, released on December 28, 1988, by Pony Canyon as the lead single from her third studio album Joy (1989). Almost a year later to the day, Kudo marked her second appearance on Kōhaku Uta Gassen by performing "Koi Hitoyo".

== Background ==
"Koi Hitoyo" is a mid-tempo song written by Gorō Matsui and composed and produced by Tsugutoshi Gotō. The song was used in televised commercials for the Hakone Open-Air Museum. The lyrics of the song describe the thoughts racing through the protagonist's head as she spends the night with her lover for the first time. At the time of the recording, Kudo complained to her then-executive producer, Yūzō Watanabe, that she was having a hard time singing the song because the tessitura was too high. Watanabe assured her that "he liked the pain in her voice" and Kudo proceeded with recording "Koi Hitoyo" without changing the key of the song. She has since stated that Watanabe's encouragement helped her gain trust in his vision and that after that she always sang the songs they worked on together in the key he would suggest.

== Cover versions ==
In 2008, Acid Black Cherry recorded a cover of the song that was initially released as a B-side on his single "Fuyu no Maboroshi" and later included on his album, Recreation (2008). Maki Goto recorded a cover of "Koi Hitoyo" for her mini album Gloria (2011). Goto's version was released as a digital download on November 10, 2010 as a promotional single for the album.

== Chart performance ==
"Koi Hitoyo" entered the Oricon Singles Chart at number two, with 225,000 copies sold. The following week, it reached the top of the chart, where it stayed for two consecutive weeks. The song charted for a total of 21 weeks. It is Kudo's second best-selling single, behind "Dōkoku" (1993), with sales surpassing half a million copies. "Koi Hitoyo" ranked at number six on the year-end Oricon Singles Chart for 1989, and was one of three singles released by Kudo that year to rank in the yearly top ten.

== Track listing ==
All lyrics are written by Gorō Matsui; all music is composed by Tsugutoshi Gotō.

No.	Title	Arranger(s)	Length
1.	"Koi Hitoyo" (恋一夜, "Love All Night")	Tsugutoshi Gotō	4:32
2.	"Non-Stop"	Gotō	3:51
Total length:			8:23

== Charts ==
Chart (1989)	Peak position	Sales
Japan Weekly Singles (Oricon)	1	607,000
Japan Monthly Singles (Oricon)	1	607,000
Japan Yearly Singles (Oricon)	6	607,000

== See also ==
- List of Oricon number-one singles
- 1988 in Japanese music
