= Kindan no Telepathy =

1987 single by Shizuka Kudō

Single by Shizuka Kudo

from the album Mysterious
- Released: August 31, 1987
- Genre: Pop
- Length: 3:47
- Label: Pony Canyon
- Songwriters: Yasushi Akimoto; Tsugutoshi Gotō
- Producer: Tsugutoshi Gotō

Shizuka Kudo singles chronology
"Kindan no Telepathy" (1987)	"Again" (1987)

Audio sample
- "Kindan no Telepathy": file; help

"Kindan no Telepathy" (禁断(きんだん)のテレパシー, Kindan no Terepashī; lit. "Forbidden Telepathy") is a song recorded by Japanese singer Shizuka Kudo, from her debut solo studio album Mysterious. It was released through Canyon Records as the lead single from Mysterious on August 31, 1987.

== Background ==
"Kindan no Telepathy" was written and produced by Yasushi Akimoto and Tsugutoshi Gotō, the same duo behind all five singles of the Onyanko Club offshoot idol group Ushirogami Hikaretai, of which Kudo was still an active member when she made her solo debut. Its lyrics describe the intuitive feeling about a romantic breakup that the protagonist is pretending to ignore. "Kindan no Telepathy" debuted at number-one on the Oricon Singles Chart and charted for eight weeks.

== Track listing ==
All lyrics are written by Yasushi Akimoto; all music is composed by Tsugutoshi Gotō.

No.	Title	Arranger(s)	Length
1.	"Kindan no Telepathy" (禁断のテレパシー Kindan no Terepashī "Forbidden Telepathy")	Tsugutoshi Gotō	3:47
2.	"Ai ga Itai Yoru" (愛が痛い夜 "Nights When Love Hurts")	Gotō	4:03
Total length:			7:50

== Charts ==
Chart (1987)	Peak position	Sales
Japan Weekly Singles (Oricon)	1	146,000
Japan Monthly Singles (Oricon)	3	146,000
Japan Yearly Singles (Oricon)	59	146,000

== Nana Katase version ==
"Kindan no Telepathy"

Single by Nana Katase

from the album Extended
- Released: March 31, 2004
- Genre: J-pop; dance-pop
- Length: 3:47
- Label: Avex Trax
- Songwriters: Yasushi Akimoto; Tsugutoshi Gotō
- Producer: Shōichirō Hirata

Nana Katase singles chronology
"Meu amor é..." (2004)	"Kindan no Telepathy" (2004)

In 2004, Japanese singer Nana Katase released a dance-pop inspired rendition of "Kindan no Telepathy" as the second single from her second album Extended, on which she covered seven hit songs from the 1980s. Katase's version was produced by Hirata Shōichirō. "Kindan no Telepathy" was the sixth and final single released by Katase. It debuted at number 38 on the Oricon Singles Chart and charted for two weeks.

=== Track listing ===
All lyrics are written by Yasushi Akimoto; all music is composed by Tsugutoshi Gotō.

No.	Title	Arranger(s)	Length
1.	"Kindan no Telepathy"	Shōichirō Hirata	4:13
2.	"Kindan no Telepathy" (Extended Dance Mix)	Hirata	5:32
3.	"Kindan no Telepathy" (Instrumental)	Hirata	4:11
Total length:			13:56

=== Charts ===
Chart (2004)	Peak position	Sales
Japan Weekly Singles (Oricon)	38	4,000

== See also ==
- List of Oricon number-one singles
- 1987 in Japanese music
