= Ryohei Suzuki =

Japanese actor (born 1983)

- 鈴木 亮平
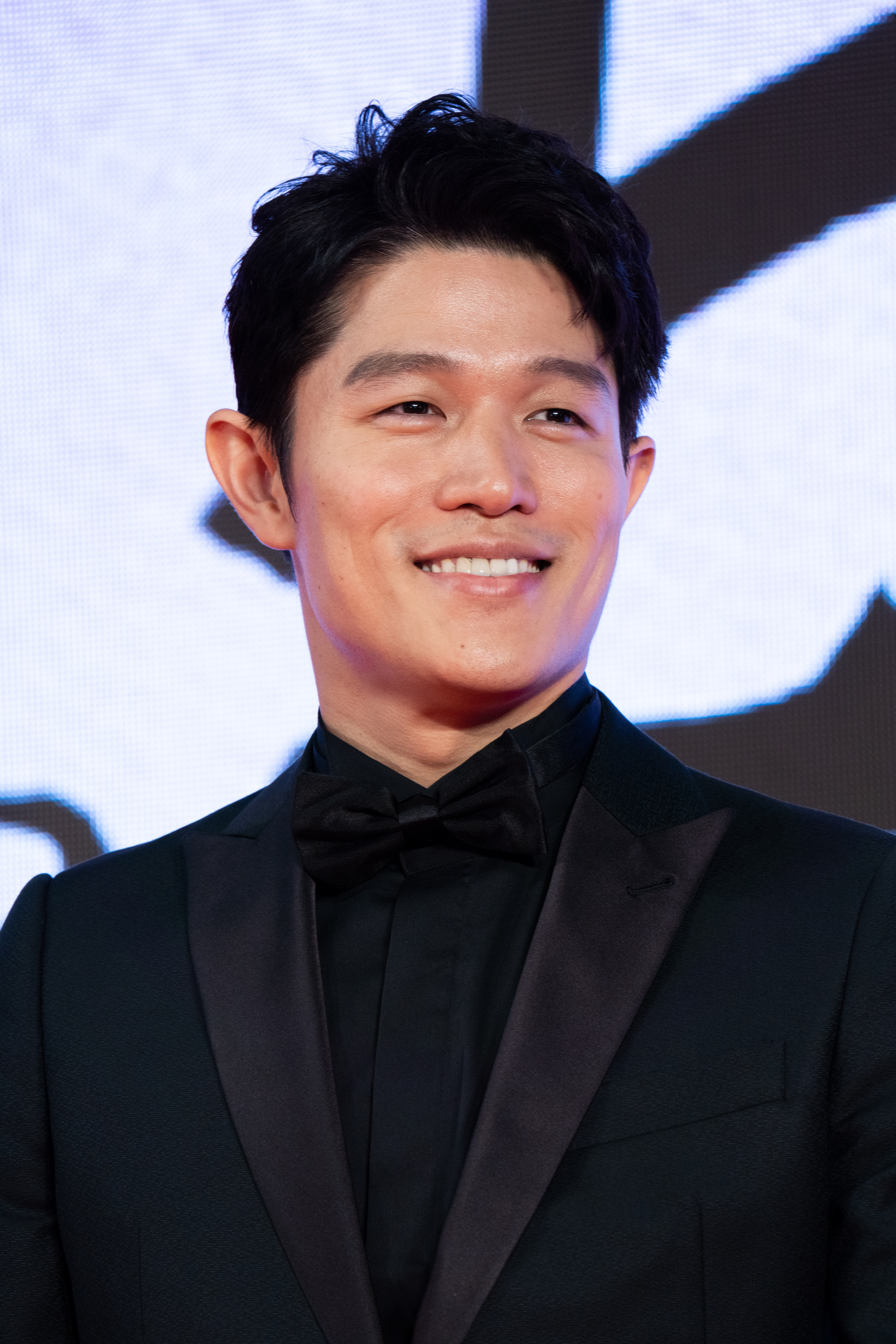
- Suzuki at Tokyo International Film Festival in 2019
- Born: March 29, 1983 (age 43); Nishinomiya, Japan
- Other names: Ryohei Tomochika (友近 亮平, Tomochika Ryōhei)
- Education: Tokyo University of Foreign Studies
- Occupation: Actor
- Agent: Horipro
- Spouse: Unnamed (m. 2011)
- Children: 1
- Website: Official profile

Ryohei Suzuki (鈴木 亮平, Suzuki Ryōhei; born March 29, 1983 in Nishinomiya, Hyōgo Prefecture, Japan) is a Japanese actor who is represented by the talent agency Horipro.

== Early life and studies ==
Suzuki became interested in learning English after a visit to an uncle, who was living in Los Angeles when he was in Elementary school.

He and his brother went to the YMCA when he was in elementary school. While in the third year of junior high school, he participated in a YMCA program in Nishinomiya City. Words from a teacher in the YMCA remained in him, motivating him to study hard, taking his English classes seriously.

While in the second and third years of junior high school, he did short-term homestays (one to two-week periods) in the United States and Australia. He then went to study abroad for one year, to rural Oklahoma, United States, while he was in high school. According to a comment on a TV program, Suzuki's reason to go abroad to study, was his first love.

He graduated from Tokyo University of Foreign Studies with a Bachelor's degree in English studies in March 2006.

He also became interested in German, after "falling in love with a German girl", as he said in a program. He won Dokkyo University's National High School German Speech Contest in 2000.

When he was a student, he worked part-time in NHK.

== Career ==
Ryohei earned five Best Supporting Actor awards as well as the Japan Academy Prize for playing the role of a yakuza in The Blood of Wolves: Level 2 (2021). That same year, he earned Best Actor at the Asian Contents Awards in Korea for his role in Tokyo MER (2022). Its sequel film was released in 2023.

In 2023, he starred in Egoist, an independent feature about a same-sex relationship. Suzuki's performance earned him the Rising Star Award at the New York Asian Film Festival and a nomination for Best Actor at the Asian Film Awards in Hong Kong.

Ryohei Suzuki played a role in the Netflix film City Hunter (2024), an action adaptation of 1980s manga. He earned both the Best Leading Actor and Best Comedy Performance awards at the Asian Academy Creative Awards in Singapore. Additionally, City Hunter won Best Feature at the same awards.

== Private life ==
Suzuki announce his marriage to a non-celebrity woman who works for a web-related company in Tokyo, via his agency on July 28, 2011. He met her while he was a model. The wedding ceremony and reception were held on July 24 at a hotel in Tokyo with only close relatives. They welcomed their first child, a girl, on November 17, 2011, at a hospital in Tokyo. He reported this the same day on his official blog.

== Filmography ==
=== TV series ===
| Year | Title | Role | Notes | Ref. |
|---|---|---|---|---|
| 2005 | Tokyo Michika | | Credited as Ryohei Tomochika | |
| 2006 | Regatta | | | |
| 2007 | Hana-Kimi | Soichiro Akashi | | |
| 2007 | Attention Students! | Minamida | Final episode | |
| 2007 | Hatsukoi net.com: Wasurerarenai Koi no uta | Yuji Kuroda | Episode 1 | |
| 2009 | Mei's Butler | Daimon | | |
| 2012 | Today is the Best Day | Kyosuke Misaki | | |
| 2014 | Hanako and Anne | Eiji Muraoka | Asadora | |
| 2015 | The Emperor's Cook | Shutaro Akiyama | | |
| 2015 | 100 days: Love, Marriage, Sickness and Mom | Yuichi Sonoda | | |
| 2016 | Goodbye Ghosts! | Nabeshima | | |
| 2017 | Moribito: Guardian of the Spirit II | Hyugo | Fantasy taiga drama | |
| 2017 | Tokyo Tarareba Musume | Tetsuro Hayasaka | | |
| 2017 | Kenji Miyazawa's Table | Kenji Miyazawa | Lead role | |
| 2017 | Moribito: Guardian of the Spirit III | Hyugo | Fantasy taiga drama | |
| 2018 | Segodon | Saigō Takamori | Lead role; taiga drama | |
| 2020 | Ship of Theseus | Bungo Sano | | |
| 2021 | Tokyo MER: Mobile Emergency Room | Kōta Kitami | Lead role | |
| 2022 | Elpis | Saitō | | |
| 2023 | Worst to First: A Teen Baseball Miracle | Shūji Nagumo | Lead role | |
| 2025 | Queen of Mars | Midori-E0106 | Miniseries | |
| 2026 | Reboot | Riku Hayase / Ayumi Gido | Lead role | |

=== Film ===
| Year | Title | Role | Notes | Ref. |
|---|---|---|---|---|
| 2015 | Have a Song on Your Lips | Yuri's fiancé (Voice) | | |
| 2017 | Mumon: The Land of Stealth | Shimoyama Heibei | | |
| 2019 | One Night | Daiki Inamura | | |
| 2021 | Baragaki: Unbroken Samurai | Kondō Isami | | |
| 2021 | Last of the Wolves | Shigehiro Uebayashi | | |
| 2021 | The Mole Song: Final | Reo Todoroki | | |
| 2023 | Tokyo MER: Mobile Emergency Room – The Movie | Kōta Kitami | Lead role | |
| 2023 | Egoist | Kōsuke | Lead role | |
| 2023 | Revolver Lily | Assassin X | Cameo | |
| 2024 | City Hunter | Ryo Saeba | Lead role | |
| 2025 | Petals and Memories | Toshiki Kato | Lead role | |
| 2025 | Tokyo MER: Mobile Emergency Room – Nankai Mission | Kōta Kitami | Lead role | |
| 2026 | Shin Gekijōban Keroro Gunsō: Fukkatsu Shite Sokkō Chikyū Metsubō no Kiki de Arimasu! | HK (Voice) | | |
| 2026 | Tokyo MER: Mobile Emergency Room – Capital Crisis | Kōta Kitami | Lead role | |
| 2027 | City Hunter 2 | Ryo Saeba | Lead role | |

=== Dubbing ===
- Lightyear, Buzz Lightyear

== Awards and nominations ==
| Year | Award ceremony | Category | Result | Ref. |
|---|---|---|---|---|
| 2015 | 39th Elan d'or Awards | Newcomers of the Year | Won | |
| 2015 | 8th International Drama Festival in Tokyo | Best Supporting Actor | Won | |
| 2016 | 58th Blue Ribbon Awards | Best Actor | Nominated | |
| 2021 | 34th Nikkan Sports Film Awards | Best Supporting Actor | Won | |
| 2021 | 46th Hochi Film Awards | Best Supporting Actor | Won | |
| 2022 | 43rd Yokohama Film Festival | Best Supporting Actor | Won | |
| 2022 | 76th Mainichi Film Awards | Best Supporting Actor | Nominated | |
| 2022 | 64th Blue Ribbon Awards | Best Supporting Actor | Nominated | |
| 2022 | 45th Japan Academy Film Prize | Best Supporting Actor | Won | |
| 2022 | 95th Kinema Junpo Awards | Best Supporting Actor | Won | |
| 2022 | 17th Osaka Cinema Festival | Best Supporting Actor | Won | |
| 2023 | 16th Asian Film Awards | Best Actor | Nominated | |
| 2023 | 22nd New York Asian Film Festival | Screen International Rising Star Asia Award | Won | |
| 2023 | 36th Nikkan Sports Film Awards | Best Actor | Won | |
| 2024 | 78th Mainichi Film Awards | Best Actor | Won | |
| 2024 | 45th Yokohama Film Festival | Best Actor | Won | |
| 2024 | 66th Blue Ribbon Awards | Best Actor | Nominated | |
| 2024 | 17th Asian Film Awards | Excellence in Asian Cinema Award | Won | |
| 2024 | 47th Japan Academy Film Prize | Best Actor | Nominated | |
| 2026 | 68th Blue Ribbon Awards | Best Actor | Nominated | |
| 2026 | 29th Nikkan Sports Drama Grand Prix | Best Actor | Won | |

== Books ==
- Suzuki Ryōhei First Photo Book (released on September 12, 2014)
- Suzuki Ryōhei no chūgaku eigo de sekai isshū! Feat. Steve Soresi (released on April 12, 2018)
- Itta ki ni naru seikaiisan (released on September 10, 2020)
