= Gold compact disc =

Media material variant

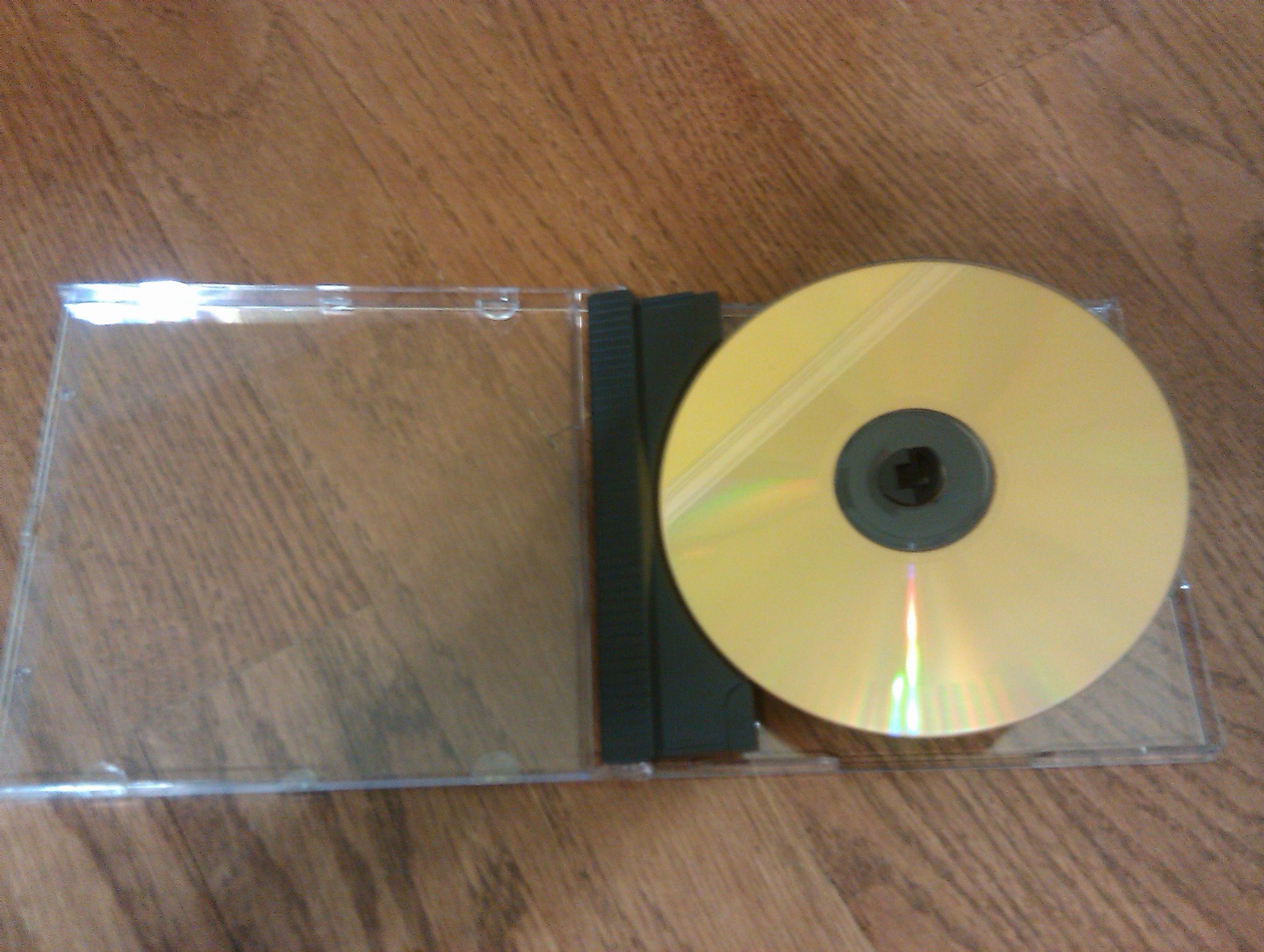
A gold CD in a lift-lock case

A gold compact disc is one in which gold is utilized in place of the high-purity aluminium or silver commonly used as the reflective coating on ordinary CDs and CD-Rs respectively. Gold disks are available as both CDs and CD-Rs as well, and are compatible with standard players and recorders.

The advantage of the gold reflection layer lies in its corrosion resistance. As such, gold CDs were seen as a potential solution to the incidence of CD rot on early CDs (mainly manufactured by PDO UK).

In 2014, Audio Fidelity, an American publisher of audiophile CDs, announced that it was abandoning the gold format and moving to the hybrid Super Audio CD (SACD) format for future releases.

== See also ==
- Compact disc
- Enhanced CD
- Remastering
- CD rot
- Gold album
- Audiophile
- Mobile Fidelity Sound Lab (MFSL)
- Super Audio CD
- Extended Resolution Compact Disc
