= Yuki Saito discography =

- Studio albums: 14
- Extended plays: 1
- Live albums: 1
- Compilation albums: 10
- Singles: 21
- Video albums: 9
- Omnibus tribute albums: 5

Yuki Saito (斉藤 由貴, Saitō Yuki) is a singer-songwriter, actor, essayist, and poet born on September 10, 1966, in Minami-ku, Yokohama, Kanagawa Prefecture, Japan. All albums are listed chronologically.

== Singles ==
- "Sotsugyō", Canyon, February 21, 1985, 7A0464 (EP), commercial song for "Seishun to Iu Na no Ramen" from Myojo Foods
- "Shiroi Honō", Canyon, May 21, 1985, 7A0488 (EP)
- "Hatsukoi", Canyon, August 21, 1985, 7A0508 (EP)
- "Jōnetsu", Canyon, November 15, 1985, 7A0539 (EP), theme song from the Toho movie Yuki no Danshō
- "Kanashimi yo Konnichi wa", Canyon, March 21, 1986, 7A0562 (EP), theme song from Maison Ikkoku
- "Doyōbi no Tamanegi", Canyon, May 21, 1986, C12A0491 (EP), remade into the song "Mizutama Jikan" by Hiroko Taniyama
- "Aozora no Kakera", Canyon, August 21, 1986, 7A0615 (EP)
- "May", Canyon, November 19, 1986, 7A0660 (EP), created as part of a competition with Hiroko Taniyama
- "Suna no Shiro", Canyon, April 10, 1987, 7A0708 (EP)
- "Sayonara", Canyon, November 18, 1987, 7A0797 (EP), theme from Sayonara no Onnatachi
- "Oracion —Inori—", Canyon, June 21, 1988, 7A0867 (EP)
- "Christmas Night", Canyon, November 21, 1988, S10A-0220 (EP)
- "Yume no Nake e", Canyon, April 21, 1989, 6A1005 (EP), S9A1007 (CD)
- "Ave Maria", Canyon, November 21, 1989, PCDA-00033 (CD)
- "Itsuka", Canyon, January 15, 1992, PCDA-00268 (CD), PCSA-00178 (CT)
- "Naze", Canyon, November 18, 1994, PCDA-00675 (CD)
- "Komugi Iro no Tenshi", Canyon, April 21, 1999, CODA-1722 (CD), theme song from movie Komugi Iro no Tenshi
- "Kateinai de-to", KAS, June 7, 2006
- "Kaze no mukou", Index Music, January 24, 2007, theme song from Les Misérables: Shōjo Cosette
- "Kanashimi yo Konnichi wa (21st Century ver.)", Team Entertainment, November 28, 2007
- "KIZUNA", 2011, ending theme for NHK anime Heugemono

== Studio albums ==
=== Axia ===
Canyon, June 21, 1985. See Axia (album).

=== Glass no Kodō ===
Canyon, March 21, 1986, C28A0479 (LP), D32A0168 (CD), 28P6515 (CT)

1. Sen no Fūne (instrumental)
2. Tsukinohara
3. Doyōbi no Tamanegi
4. Hatsukohi
5. Jōnetsu
6. Cosmos Tsūshin
7. Pajama no Cinderella
8. Ohikkoshi • Wasuremono
9. Umi no Ehagaki
10. Ima dake no Hontō

=== Chime ===
Canyon, October 21, 1986. See Chime (Yuki Saito album).

=== Fūmu ===
Canyon, April 21, 1987, C28A0562 (LP), D32A0281 (CD), 28P6592 (CT)

1. One
2. Taiikukan wa Odoru
3. Oyashirasu ga Itanda Hi
4. Side Seat
5. 12-gatsu no Calendar
6. Kioku
7. Himawari
8. Suna no Shiro
9. May
10. Nemuri Hime
11. Machikado no Snap
12. Kaze • Yume • Tenshi
13. Kazoku no Shokutaku

=== Ripple ===
Canyon, September 21, 1987, D25A0317 (CD)

1. Sayonara, Sayonara!
2. Scooter 17
3. Piihyara
4. Bōken Kozō
5. Ushiro no Shōmen Daare
6. Amanojaku

=== Pant ===
Canyon, March 21, 1988, C28A0626 (CD)

1. Owari no Kehai
2. Shōjo Jidai
3. Blue Submarine
4. Kawaii Atashi
5. Christmas Night
6. Morn: Tōmei na Kabe
7. Furisode ni Peace Sign
8. 3-nenme
9. Sayonara
10. Thanks!

=== To You ===
Canyon, December 7, 1988, D30A0413 (CD)

1. Ave Maria
2. How come: Dōshite Kō na no?
3. When
4. What
5. Why
6. Where: Kin Iro no Yoru
7. Who

=== Age ===
Canyon, April 21, 1989, D29A1008 (CD)

1. Lucky Dragon
2. N'oublie pas Mai (5-gatsu o Wasurenai de)
3. Glass no Tenkyūgi
4. Luna
5. Eien no Tasogare
6. Doll House
7. Anata no Sonzai
8. Ameiro Tokeiten
9. In My House
10. Lucky Dragon (Service Version)

=== Moon ===
Canyon, July 11, 1990, PCCA-00090 (CD)

1. Eien (Opening)
2. Taishō Ikareponchi Musume
3. Shōjo ga Haru no Engawa de
4. Kaiten Mokuba
5. Puraharian: Kodomobeya no Chikyū
6. Meikyū
7. Kanegoto
8. Walkin' Through Your Life
9. Ma Hi Ru (Shunkan)
10. Ending: Hello Dolly
11. Okamoto-san no Maiasa

=== Love ===
Canyon, December 4, 1991

1. Itsuka
2. Honto no Kimochi
3. Yours
4. Asa no Fūkei
5. Dare no Sei demo nai
6. Kono Mama
7. Moon Waltz:
8. Letter
9. Asa no Fūkei (Instrumental)
10. Julia
11. Imi

=== Moi ===
Canyon, December 7, 1994

1. The April Fools (Japanese Version)
2. We'll Sing in the Sunshine
3. Naze
4. I Love How You Love Me
5. Yūgure Nikki
6. Suki!
7. If
8. Kotaeru Koe wa Nakute mo
9. You Light Up My Life
10. Anata to Deatte
11. The April Fools (Original Version)

=== Nanimokamo kawaru to shite mo ===
Canyon, February 14, 2011

1. Yokan
2. Noraneko
3. Enshutsu shitai na
4. Uta
5. Dream
6. O-uchi de kakurenbo
7. Dearest
8. Ki
9. Te wo tsunagou
10. Oriai wa tsukanai
11. Eien no hito
12. Que Sera, Sera (whatever will be will be)
13. O-uchi de kakurenbo (karaoke)

=== Eternity ===
Canyon, March 11, 2015

1. Top Of The World
2. Tea For Two
3. Cheek To Cheek
4. Lovin' You
5. Blue Moon
6. Stardust
7. When I Fall In Love
8. Across The Universe
9. Madoakari
10. Eien

=== Suikyōkyoku ===
Victor, February 21, 2021

1. Sotsugyō
2. Shiroi Honō
3. Axia ~ Kanashii Kotori ~
4. Hatsukoi
5. Jōnetsu
6. Kanashimi yo Konnichi wa
7. Aozora no Kakera
8. MAY
9. Shōjo Jidai
10. Sayonara
