= Chime (Yuki Saito album) =

Chime チャイム

Studio album by Yuki Saito
- Released: October 21, 1986
- Genre: J-pop
- Length: 43:03
- Label: Canyon Records

Yuki Saito chronology
Garasu no Kodō (1986)	Chime チャイム (1986)	Fūmu (1987)

Singles from Chime
- 1. "Kanashimi yo Konnichi wa" Released: March 21, 1986; 2. "Aozora no Kakera" Released: August 21, 1986

Chime (Japanese: チャイム, Hepburn: Chaimu) is the third studio album from Yuki Saito, released on October 21, 1986 by Canyon Records. It reached #2 on the Oricon charts. The original LP release contained ten songs, though the CD released at the same time had two additional songs: "Aozora no Kakera" and "Yubiwa Monogatari", both from the "Aozora no Kakera" single release earlier that year.

== History ==
Chime was released on LP, cassette, and CD on October 21, 1986 by Canyon Records. The original LP and cassette releases contained ten songs each, and the CD contained two additional songs: "Aozora no Kakera" and "Yubiwa Monogatari", both from the "Aozora no Kakera" single release earlier that year. The LP and cassette album contain one song released previously as a single, and the CD contains three. All three contain an additional nine songs not previously released as singles. The album reached #2 on the Oricon charts and sold 267,000 copies.

"Kanashimi yo Konnichi wa" (悲しみよこんにちは; lit. "Hello Sadness") reached #3 on the Oricon charts, #6 on The Best Ten chart, and #19 by Oricon in overall sales for singles in 1986. It was used as the first theme song for the 1986 Fuji TV anime television series Maison Ikkoku. It was also used as an image song for the "Morning Fresh" line of shampoos and styling products from Shiseido. (Note: The cover of the single gives the following information just to the right of the title: CX-TV系放映「めそん一刻」主題歌 新星堂「モーニングフレッシュ」イメージ・ソング, which translates to "CX-TV Network televised Maison Ikkoku, Shinseido 'Morning Fresh' image song".)

"Aozora no Kakera" (青空のかけら; lit. "Splinters of a Blue Sky") (with B-side "Yubiwa Monogatari" (指輪物語; lit. "Tale of the Ring")) reached #1 on the Oricon charts and #3 on The Best Ten chart. It was used in commercials for the Axia brand of cassette tapes from Fujifilm in Japan.

Chime has been rereleased twice since the original release in 1985. It was released as a "Gold CD" on March 21, 1989 (catalog #D35A-0478), and in a special paper jacket packaging and remastered high quality (or "HQ") CD on August 5, 2009 (catalog #PCCA-50132).

=== Chart history ===
Chart (1986)	Release	Peak position
Oricon	"Chime"	2

== Track listing ==
LP (catalog #C28A0520, released October 21, 1986)
Cassette (catalog #28P6657, released October 21, 1986)

Side A
No.	Title	Lyrics	Music	Length
1.	"Yōkan" (予感)	Yuki Saito	Toshio Kamei(composer); Satoshi Takebe (arranger)	4:59
2.	"Kanashimi yo Konnichi wa" (悲しみよこんにちは)	Yukinojō Mori	Kōji Tamaki (composer); Satoshi Takebe (arranger)	3:56
3.	"Straw Hat no Natsu Omoi" (ストローハットの夏想い)	Seira Asakura	Mayumi (composer); Satoshi Takebe (arranger)	4:15
4.	"Tsukenakatta Uso" (つけなかった嘘)	Yukinojō Mori	Toshio Kamei (composer); Satoshi Takebe (arranger)	3:58
5.	"Ichigo Mizu no Glass" (いちご水のグラス)	Yuki Saito	Mayumi (composer); Satoshi Takebe (arranger)	4:31

Side B
No.	Title	Lyrics	Music	Length
1.	"Mizu no Haru" (水の春)	Shun Taguchi	Kenjiro Sakiya (composer); Satoshi Takebe and Kenjiro Sakiya (arrangers)	4:00
2.	"Jitensha ni Notte" (自転車にのって)	Hiroko Taniyama	Toshio Kamei (composer); Satoshi Takebe (arranger)	2:42
3.	"Acrylic-iro no Bishō" (アクリル色の微笑)	Yuki Saito	Kenjiro Sakiya (composer); Satoshi Takebe and Kenjiro Sakiya (arrangers)	4:45
4.	"Soramimi"	Hiroko Taniyama	Hiroko Taniyama (composer); Satoshi Takebe (arranger)	3:36
5.	"Anata no Koe o Kiita Yoru" (あなたの声を聞いた夜)	Yuki Saito	Takao Kisugi (composer); Satoshi Takebe (arranger)	3:56
Total length:				40:38

CD (catalog #D32A-0234, released October 21, 1986)
Gold CD (catalog #D35A-0478, released March 21, 1989)
HQ CD (catalog #PCCA-50134, released March 25, 2009)

No.	Title	Lyrics	Music	Length
1.	"Yubiwa Monogatari" (指輪物語)	Takashi Matsumoto	Kenjiro Sakiya (composer); Satoshi Takebe and Kenjiro Sakiya (arrangers)	4:12
2.	"Yōkan" (予感)	Yuki Saito	Toshio Kamei(composer); Satoshi Takebe (arranger)	4:59
3.	"Kanashimi yo Konnichi wa" (悲しみよこんにちは)	Yukinojō Mori	Kōji Tamaki (composer); Satoshi Takebe (arranger)	3:56
4.	"Straw Hat no Natsu Omoi" (ストローハットの夏想い)	Seira Asakura	Mayumi (composer); Satoshi Takebe (arranger)	4:15
5.	"Tsukenakatta Uso" (つけなかった嘘)	Yukinojō Mori	Toshio Kamei (composer); Satoshi Takebe (arranger)	3:58
6.	"Ichigo Mizu no Glass" (いちご水のグラス)	Yuki Saito	Mayumi (composer); Satoshi Takebe (arranger)	4:31
7.	"Aozora no Kakera" (青空のかけら)	Takashi Matsumoto	Toshio Kamei (composer); Satoshi Takebe (arranger)	3:48
8.	"Mizu no Haru" (水の春)	Shun Taguchi	Kenjiro Sakiya (composer); Satoshi Takebe and Kenjiro Sakiya (arrangers)	4:00
9.	"Jitensha ni Notte" (自転車にのって)	Hiroko Taniyama	Toshio Kamei (composer); Satoshi Takebe (arranger)	2:42
10.	"Acrylic-iro no Bishō" (アクリル色の微笑)	Yuki Saito	Kenjiro Sakiya (composer); Satoshi Takebe and Kenjiro Sakiya (arrangers)	4:45
11.	"Soramimi"	Hiroko Taniyama	Hiroko Taniyama (composer); Satoshi Takebe (arranger)	3:36
12.	"Anata no Koe o Kiita Yoru" (あなたの声を聞いた夜)	Yuki Saito	Takao Kisugi (composer); Satoshi Takebe (arranger)	3:56
Total length:				48:38
