= Axia (album) =

AXIA

Studio album by Yuki Saito
- Released: June 21, 1985
- Genre: J-pop
- Length: 43:03
- Label: Canyon Records
- Producer: Kazuhiro Nagaoka

Yuki Saito chronology
AXIA (1985)	The Special Series: Saito Yuki (1985)

Singles from Axia
- 1. "Sotsugyō" Released: February 12, 1985; 2. "Shiroi Honō" Released: May 21, 1985

Axia (アクシア, Akushia; usually stylized AXIA) is the debut studio album from Yuki Saito, released on June 21, 1985, by Canyon Records. It reached #6 on the Oricon charts, and has been repackaged and rereleased twice. It contains six original songs and four which had previously been released as singles.

== History ==
Axia was released on LP and cassette on June 21, 1985, by Canyon Records. The album was released two weeks later on CD on July 5, 1985. The album collects four songs released previously as singles as well as six additional songs. It reached #3 on the Oricon charts and sold 287,000 copies.

"Sotsugyō" (卒業; lit. "Graduation"), released as a single with "Seishun" (青春; lit. "Youth"), reached #6 on the Oricon charts, and #6 on The Best Ten chart. "Sotsugyō" was composed by Kyōhei Tsutsumi, arranged by Satoshi Takebe, with lyrics by Takashi Matsumoto.

The B-side, Seishun (青春; lit. Youth), was composed by Tsutsumi, arranged by Masataka Matsutoya, with lyrics by Matsumoto. (Note: These individuals are all listed on the album cover as well as the label on the vinyl EP itself.) "Seishun" was used in commercials for the home video release of the Fuji TV 1985 drama series Yakyū-kyō no Uta (野球狂の詩) in which Saito starred.

"Shiroi Honō" (白い炎; lit. "White Blaze") was released as a single with "Shabon-iro no Natsu" (石鹸＜シャボン＞色の夏; lit. "Soap Bubble-colored Summer"), reaching #5 on the Oricon charts and #10 on The Best Ten chart. "Shiroi Honō" had lyrics by Yukinojō Mori, with the music composed by Kōji Tamaki and arranged by Takebe. "Shabon-iro no Natsu" also has lyrics by Mori, and was composed by Toshio Kamei and arranged by Takebe. It was used as the theme song for the first Sukeban Deka television drama series, in which Saito also starred as the main character, Saki.

"Axia: Kanashii Kotori" (AXIA 〜かなしいことり〜, Akushia: Kanashii Kotori; lit. "Axia: Sorrowful Little Bird") was used in commercials for the Axia brand of cassette tapes from Fujifilm in Japan. Natsuo Giniro composed the song and wrote the lyrics, and Takebe arranged the music.

Axia has been rereleased twice since the original release in 1985. It was released as a "Gold CD" on March 21, 1989 (catalog #D35A-0476), and in a special paper jacket packaging and remastered high quality (or "HQ") CD on August 5, 2009 (catalog #PCCA-50132).

=== Chart history ===
Chart (1985)	Release	Peak position
Oricon	"Axia"	3

== Track listing ==
LP (catalog #C28A0416, released June 21, 1985)
Cassette (catalog #28P6438, released June 21, 1985)

Side A
No.	Title	Lyrics	Music	Length
1.	"Sotsugyō (卒業)"	Takashi Matsumoto	Kyōhei Tsutsumi (composer); Satoshi Takebe (arranger)	4:46
2.	"Shabon-iro no Natsu (石鹸＜シャボン＞色の夏)"	Yukinojō Mori	Toshio Kamei (composer); Satoshi Takebe (arranger)	4:15
3.	"Seishun (青春)"	Takashi Matsumoto	Kyōhei Tsutsumi (composer); Masataka Matsutoya (arranger)	3:51
4.	"Finale no Kaze (フィナーレの風)"	Fuyuko Moroboshi	Shigeru Amano (composer); Satoshi Takebe (arranger)	3:51
5.	"Axia: Kanashii Kotori (AXIA 〜かなしいことり〜)"	Natsuo Giniro	Natsuo Giniro (composer); Satoshi Takebe (arranger)	4:35

Side B
No.	Title	Lyrics	Music	Length
1.	"Shiroi Honō (白い炎)"	Yukinojō Mori	Kōji Tamaki (composer); Satoshi Takebe (arranger)	4:12
2.	"Jōkyũsei (上級生)"	Shun Taguchi	Ryō Matsuda (composer); Satoshi Takebe (arranger)	4:38
3.	"Tenohira no Kikyūsen (手のひらの気球船)"	Shun Taguchi	Toshio Kamei (composer); Satoshi Takebe (arranger)	4:38
4.	"Kanshō Romance (感傷ロマンス)"	Fuyuko Moroboshi	Shigeru Amano (composer); Satoshi Takebe (arranger)	4:11
5.	"Ame no Roadshow (雨のロードショー)"	Etsuko Kisugi	Takao Kisugi (composer); Satoshi Takebe (arranger)	4:06
Total length:				43:03

CD (catalog #D32A-0096, released July 5, 1985)
Gold CD (catalog #D35A-0476, released March 21, 1989)
HQ CD (catalog #PCCA-50132, released August 5, 2009)

No.	Title	Lyrics	Music	Length
1.	"Sotsugyō (卒業)"	Takashi Matsumoto	Kyōhei Tsutsumi (composer); Satoshi Takebe (arranger)	4:46
2.	"Kessen-iro no Natsu (石鹸色の夏)"	Yukinojō Mori	Toshio Kamei (composer); Satoshi Takebe (arranger)	4:15
3.	"Seishun (青春)"	Takashi Matsumoto	Kyōhei Tsutsumi (composer); Masataka Matsutoya (arranger)	3:51
4.	"Finale no Kaze (フィナーレの風)"	Fuyuko Moroboshi	Shigeru Amano (composer); Satoshi Takebe (arranger)	3:51
5.	"Axia: Kanashii Kotori (AXIA 〜かなしいことり〜)"	Natsuo Giniro	Natsuo Giniro (composer); Satoshi Takebe (arranger)	4:35
6.	"Shiroi Honō (白い炎)"	Yukinojō Mori	Kōji Tamaki (composer); Satoshi Takebe (arranger)	4:12
7.	"Jōkyũsei (上級生)"	Shun Taguchi	Ryō Matsuda (composer); Satoshi Takebe (arranger)	4:38
8.	"Tenohira no Kikyūsen (手のひらの気球船)"	Shun Taguchi	Toshio Kamei (composer); Satoshi Takebe (arranger)	4:38
9.	"Kanshō Romance (感傷ロマンス)"	Fuyuko Moroboshi	Shigeru Amano (composer); Satoshi Takebe (arranger)	4:11
10.	"Ame no Roadshow (雨のロードショー)"	Etsuko Kisugi	Takao Kisugi (composer); Satoshi Takebe (arranger)	4:06
Total length:				43:03
