= Shiroi Honō =

- Cover of EP release of "Shiroi Honō"

Single by Yuki Saito

from the album Axia
- A-side: "Shiroi Honō"
- B-side: "Shabon-iro no Natsu"
- Released: May 21, 1985
- Genre: J-pop
- Length: 8:27
- Label: Canyon

Yuki Saito singles chronology
| "Sotsugyō" (1985) | "Shiroi Honō" (1985) | "Hatsukoi" (1985) |

"Shiroi Honō" (白い炎, lit. "White Blaze") is the second single from Japanese singer Yuki Saito. The single was released by Canyon Records on May 21, 1985, and was used as the theme song for the first Sukeban Deka television drama series on Fuji TV, in which Saito also played the main character, Saki Asamiya.

== History ==
"Shiroi Honō" was released by Canyon Records on May 21, 1985. It was used as the theme song for the first Sukeban Deka television drama series on Fuji TV, and Saito was the first to play the main character in the series, Saki Asamiya (she was followed by Yoko Minamino in the second series and Yui Asaka in the third). While Saito's first release, "Sotsugyō" is a pop song, "Shiroi Honō" is a rock song.

The title song was composed by Kōji Tamaki, and the B-side, "Shabon-iro no Natsu" (石鹸＜シャボン＞色の夏), was composed by Toshio Kamei. Both songs had lyrics written by Yukinojō Mori, and both were arranged by Satoshi Takebe. (Note: These individuals are all listed on the album cover as well as the label on the vinyl EP itself.)

=== Chart history ===
| Chart (1985) | Release | Peak position |
|---|---|---|
| Oricon | "Shiroi Honō/Shabon-iro no Natsu" | 5 |
| The Best Ten | "Shiroi Honō/Shabon-iro no Natsu" | 9 |

== Track listing ==
EP (catalog #7A0488), CD single (catalog #S10A0032, released April 29, 1988)
| No. | Title | Lyrics | Music | Length |
|---|---|---|---|---|
| 1. | "Shiroi Honō (白い炎)" | Yukinojō Mori | Kōji Tamaki (composer); Satoshi Takebe (arranger) | 4:12 |
| 2. | "Shabon-iro no Natsu (石鹸＜シャボン＞色の夏)" | Yukinojō Mori | Toshio Kamei (composer); Satoshi Takebe (arranger) | 4:15 |
| Total length: | | | | 8:27 |

== Covers ==
The title sing was covered by Chiwa Saitō on the Rosario + Vampire Capu2 Character Song 2 single, released on October 29, 2008, and the Rosario + Vampire Idol Cover Best Album, released on February 18, 2009.
