= Hatsukoi (Yuki Saito song) =

"Hatsukoi 初戀"
- Cover of EP release of Hatsukoi.

Single by Yuki Saito

from the album Garasu no Kodō
- A-side: "Hatsukoi"
- B-side: "Umi no Ehagaki"
- Released: August 21, 1985
- Genre: J-pop
- Length: 3:38
- Label: Canyon Records
- Songwriters: Takashi Matsumoto, Kyōhei Tsutsumi

Yuki Saito singles chronology
"'Shiroi Honō'" (1985)	"Hatsukoi 初戀" (1985)	"'Jōnetsu'" (1985)

Hatsukoi (初戀; lit. "First Love") is the third single by Japanese pop singer Yuki Saito. It was released August 21, 1985 by Canyon Records together with "Umi no Ehagaki" (海の絵葉書; lit. "Ocean Picture Postcard"). It was ranked #4 on two charts and #5 on another.

== History ==
"Hatsukoi" was released on August 21, 1985 as a 7-inch single vinyl record through Canyon Records. The single reached #4 on both the Oricon and The Hitchart Hot 30 charts, and #5 on The Best Ten chart. The B-side release was "Umi no Ehagaki". Both songs had lyrics written by Takashi Matsumoto, with Kyōhei Tsutsumi composing the songs and Satoshi Takebe arranging them. (Note: These individuals are all listed on the album cover as well as the label on the vinyl EP itself.)

The single sold 162,000 copies and included a small foldout pinup poster featuring Saito in a yukata. It was later rereleased as a mini CD single on April 29, 1988.

=== Chart history ===
Chart (1985)	Release	Peak position
Oricon	"Hatsukoi/Umi no Ehagaki"	4
The Hitchart Hot 30	"Hatsukoi/Umi no Ehagaki"	4
The Best Ten	"Hatsukoi/Umi no Ehagaki"	5

== Track listing ==
EP (catalog #7A0508) CD single (catalog #S10A0033, released April 29, 1988)
No.	Title	Lyrics	Music	Length
1.	"Hatsukoi" (初戀)	Takashi Matsumoto	Kyōhei Tsutsumi (composer); Satoshi Takebe (arranger)	3:38
2.	"Umi no Ehagaki" (海の絵葉書)	Takashi Matsumoto	Kyōhei Tsutsumi (composer); Satoshi Takebe (arranger)	4:15
Total length:				7:53
