= Aozora no Kakera =

"Aozora no Kakera 青空のかけら"
- Cover of single release of Aozora no Kakera.

Single by Yuki Saito

from the album Chime
- A-side: "Aozora no Kakera"
- B-side: "Yubiwa Monogatari"
- Released: August 21, 1986
- Genre: J-pop
- Length: 3:49
- Label: Canyon Records
- Songwriters: Takashi Matsumoto, Toshio Kamei

Yuki Saito singles chronology
"'Doyōbi no Tamanegi'" (1986)	"Aozora no Kakera 青空のかけら" (1986)	"'May'" (1986)

Aozora no Kakera (青空のかけら; lit. "Splinters of a Blue Sky") is the seventh single by Japanese pop singer Yuki Saito. It was released August 21, 1986, by Canyon Records together with "Yubiwa Monogatari" (指輪物語; lit. "Tale of the Ring"). It was ranked #1 on the Oricon charts and #3 on The Best Ten chart, and is the only single from Saito to reach #1 on the Oricon charts.

The title song was used in commercials for the Axia brand of cassette tapes from Fujifilm in Japan. Several artists have covered the song.

== History ==
"Aozora no Kakera" was released on August 21, 1986, as a 7-inch vinyl record through Canyon Records. The single reached #1 on the Oricon charts, and is the only single from Saito to do so. It also reached #3 on The Best Ten chart. The B-side release was "Yubiwa Monogatari".

The title song had lyrics written by Takashi Matsumoto, the music was composed by Toshio Kamei and was arranged by Satoshi Takebe. Matsumoto also wrote the lyrics for the B-side, while Kenjiro Sakiya composed the music, and Takebe and Sakiya arranged the music. (Note: These individuals are all listed on the album cover as well as the label on the vinyl EP itself.)

The title single was used in commercials for the Axia brand of cassette tapes from Fujifilm in Japan.

The original single sold 48,000 copies, and sold a total of 166,000 copies. It was later rereleased as a mini CD single on April 29, 1988.

=== Covers ===
On August 26, 1992, Japanese techno band Long Vacation (a spinoff of Uchoten) released a cover version of "Aozora no Kakera" on their Long Vacation's Pop album.

Singer and actress Chiemi Hori performed a cover on her 80s Idol Songs Collection, released in both regular and limited edition versions on September 8, 2005.

Japanese singer Asako Toki released a cover on her Light! CM & Cover Songs album released on February 2, 2011.

=== Chart history ===
Chart (1986)	Release	Peak position
Oricon	"Aozora no Kakera / Yubiwa Monogatari"	1
The Best Ten	"Aozora no Kakera / Yubiwa Monogatari"	3

== Track listing ==
EP (catalog #7A0615) CD single (catalog #S10A0036, released April 29, 1988)
No.	Title	Lyrics	Music	Length
1.	"Aozora no Kakera" (青空のかけら)	Takashi Matsumoto	Toshio Kamei (composer); Satoshi Takebe (arranger)	3:49
2.	"Yubiwa Monogatari" (指輪物語)	Takashi Matsumoto	Kenjiro Sakiya (composer); Satoshi Takebe and Kenjiro Sakiya (arrangers)	4:11
Total length:				8:00

== See also ==
- 1986 in Japanese music
