= Sotsugyō (Yuki Saito song) =

"Sotsugyō 卒業"
- Cover of EP release of Sotsugyō.

Single by Yuki Saito

from the album Axia
- A-side: "Sotsugyō"
- B-side: "Seishun"
- Released: February 12, 1985
- Genre: J-pop
- Length: 4:46
- Label: Canyon Records
- Composer: Kyōhei Tsutsumi (composer)
- Lyricist: Takashi Matsumoto

Yuki Saito singles chronology
"Sotsugyō 卒業" (1985)	"'Shiroi Honō'" (1985)

"Sotsugyō" (卒業; lit. "Graduation") is the debut single of Japanese singer Yuki Saito. The single was released by Canyon Records on February 12, 1985, and was used as an image song for Myojo Foods' "A Ramen Named Youth" (青春という名のラーメン, Seishun to Iu Na no Rāmen) line of instant ramen. (Note: The cover of the single gives the following information just to the right of the title: 明星食品「青春という名のラーメン」イメージソング, which translates to "Myojo Foods 'Seishun to Iu Na no Rāmen' Image Song.) The song continues to be popular over 30 years after its debut, having been covered by multiple artists.

== History ==
"Sotsugyō" was released on February 12, 1985 by Canyon Records, and debuted at #10 on the Oricon charts where it remained for 3 weeks before climbing as high as #6 and selling a total of 247,140 copies. It also reached #6 on The Best Ten chart. The EP single included a full-body pinup of Saito in a white dress and white sweater.

The title song was composed by Kyōhei Tsutsumi, arranged by Satoshi Takebe, with lyrics by Takashi Matsumoto. The B-side, "Seishun" (青春; lit. Youth), was composed by Tsutsumi, arranged by Masataka Matsutoya, with lyrics by Matsumoto. (Note: These individuals are all listed on the album cover as well as the label on the vinyl EP itself.)

=== Chart history ===
Chart (1985)	Release	Peak position
Oricon	"Sotsugyō/Seishun"	6
The Best Ten	"Sotsugyō/Seishun"	6

== Track listing ==
EP (catalog #7A0464) CD single (catalog #S10A0031, released April 29, 1988)
No.	Title	Lyrics	Music	Length
1.	"Sotsugyō" (卒業)	Takashi Matsumoto	Kyōhei Tsutsumi (composer); Satoshi Takebe (arranger)	4:46
2.	"Seishun" (青春)	Takashi Matsumoto	Kyōhei Tsutsumi (composer); Masataka Matsutoya (arranger)	3:51
Total length:				8:37

== Covers ==
Japanese singer and actress Moeko Matsushita released a single cover version on February 14, 2002. Matsushita's single reached as high as 43 on the Oricon charts and remained on the list for 2 weeks. Later that year, tarento and gravure idol Otoha released a cover on her "OtohaCD Volume 1" album on May 22, which reached #50 on the Oricon charts and remained on the list for 1 week.

Actress and gravure idol Mizuho Hata released a single cover on February 20, 2008. It reached #179 on the Oricon charts, staying on the chart for 1 week. Donna Fiore released a cover on her album "Fiore" on September 3 that same year, though it didn't make it to the Oricon top sales chart. Manami Kurose released a cover as a B-side on her "Love Is...Shine" single on March 11, 2009. A collaboration between Rie Yamaguchi and Manzo produced a cover released on their single Notice Me, Mr. Zombie, I Am Your Classmate (気づいてゾンビさま、私はクラスメイトです, Kizuite Zonbi-sama, Watashi wa Kurasumeito Desu) on February 9, 2011, where it remained on the list for four weeks and reached #44.

The duo FEMM did a cover for their album "80s/90s J-POP REVIVAL", releasing a remix named "卒業 (Radical Hardcore Remix)", as part of the double single "卒業 / 浪漫飛行" on September 27, 2017.
