= Jōnetsu (Yuki Saito song) =

"Jōnetsu 初戀"
- Cover of single release of Jōnetsu.

Single by Yuki Saito

from the album Garasu no Kodō
- A-side: "Jōnetsu"
- B-side: "Sasayaki no Yōsei"
- Released: November 15, 1985
- Genre: J-pop
- Length: 4:58
- Label: Canyon Records
- Songwriters: Takashi Matsumoto; Kyōhei Tsutsumi

Yuki Saito singles chronology
| "'Hatsukoi'" (1985) | "Jōnetsu 初戀" (1985) | "'Kanashimi yo Konnichi wa'" (1986) |

Jōnetsu (情熱; lit. "Passion") is the fourth single by Japanese pop singer Yuki Saito. It was released November 15, 1985 by Canyon Records together with "Sasayaki no Yōsei" (ささやきの妖精; lit. "Whispering Fairy"). It was ranked #3 on the Oricon charts and #6 on The Best Ten chart.

== History ==
"Jōnetsu" was released on November 15, 1985, as a 7-inch single vinyl record through Canyon Records. The single reached #3 on the Oricon charts, and #6 on The Best Ten chart. The B-side release was "Sasayaki no Yōsei". Both songs had lyrics written by Takashi Matsumoto, with Kyōhei Tsutsumi composing the songs and Satoshi Takebe arranging them. (Note: These individuals are all listed on the album cover as well as the label on the vinyl EP itself.)

The title single was used as the theme song for the 1985 Toho film Yuki no Danshō: Jōnetsu (雪の断章 -情熱-; lit. "Literary Fragment in the Snow: Passion"). Saito starred in the film, which was based on a 1975 novel, Yuki no Danshō, by Marumi Sasaki. It was also used in commercials for the Axia brand of cassette tapes from Fujifilm in Japan. (Note: The cover of the single gives the following information just to the right of the title: 東宝映画「雪の断章」の主題歌 「AXIA」のイメージ・ソング, which translates to "Toho film Yuki no Danshō theme song, 'Axia' image song".)

The original single sold 178,000 copies. It was later rereleased as a mini CD single on April 29, 1988.

=== Chart history ===
| Chart (1985) | Release | Peak position |
|---|---|---|
| Oricon | "Jōnetsu/Sasayaki no Yōsei" | 3 |
| The Best Ten | "Jōnetsu/Sasayaki no Yōsei" | 6 |

== Track listing ==
EP (catalog #7A0539) CD single (catalog #S10A0034, released April 29, 1988)
| No. | Title | Lyrics | Music | Length |
|---|---|---|---|---|
| 1. | "Jōnetsu" (情熱) | Takashi Matsumoto | Kyōhei Tsutsumi (composer); Satoshi Takebe (arranger) | 4:58 |
| 2. | "Sasayaki no Yōsei" (ささやきの妖精) | Takashi Matsumoto | Kyōhei Tsutsumi (composer); Satoshi Takebe (arranger) | 4:00 |
| Total length: | | | | 8:58 |

== Photo book ==
A photo book with the same title was released by Ponica Shuppan (through Wani Books) on November 15, 1985. The photographer for the book was Tatsuo Watanabe.
