= Suna no Shiro =

Japanese for "sand castle(s)". It may refer to:

== Entertainment ==
- Suna no Shiro (manga), a Japanese manga and television series

== Music ==
- "Suna no Shiro" (song), a single by Japanese pop singer Miho Komatsu
- "Suna no Oshiro", a single from Japanese singer Kanon Wakeshima
- "Suna no Shiro", a 1987 single from Japanese singer Yuki Saitō
