= Doyōbi no Tamanegi =

"Doyōbi no Tamanegi 土曜日のタマネギ"
- Cover of single release of Doyōbi no Tamanegi.

Single by Yuki Saito

from the album Garasu no Kodō
- A-side: "Doyōbi no Tamanegi"
- B-side: "Axia - Kanashii Kotori"
- Released: May 21, 1986
- Genre: J-pop
- Length: 3:43
- Label: Canyon Records
- Songwriters: Hiroko Taniyama, Toshio Kamei

Yuki Saito singles chronology
"'Kanashimi yo Konnichi wa'" (1986)	"Doyōbi no Tamanegi 土曜日のタマネギ" (1986)	"'Aozora no Kakera'" (1986)

Doyōbi no Tamanegi (土曜日のタマネギ; lit. "Saturday Scallions") is the sixth single by Japanese pop singer Yuki Saito. It was released May 21, 1986 by Canyon Records together with "Axia - Kanashii Kotori" (AXIA－かなしいことり－; lit. "Sorrowful Songbird"). It was ranked #6 on the Oricon charts.

== History ==
"Doyōbi no Tamanegi" was released on May 21, 1986, as a 12-inch single vinyl record through Canyon Records. The single reached #6 on the Oricon charts.

The B-side release was "Axia - Kanashii Kotori". The title song had lyrics written by Hiroko Taniyama, the music was composed by Toshio Kamei and was arranged by Satoshi Takebe. Natsuo Giniro wrote the lyrics and composed the music for the B-side, and Takebe arranged the music. (Note: These individuals are all listed on the album cover as well as the label on the vinyl EP itself.)

The original single sold 320,000 copies initially, and a total of 880,000 copies. It was later rereleased as a mini CD single on April 29, 1988.

=== Chart history ===
Chart (1986)	Release	Peak position
Oricon	"Doyōbi no Tamanegi / Axia - Kanashii Kotori"	6

== Track listing ==
12" (catalog #C12A0491) CD single (catalog #S10A0040, released April 29, 1988)
No.	Title	Lyrics	Music	Length
1.	"Doyōbi no Tamanegi" (土曜日のタマネギ)	Hiroko Taniyama	Toshio Kamei (composer); Satoshi Takebe (arranger)	3:43
2.	"Axia - Kanashii Kotori" (AXIA－かなしいことり－)	Natsuo Giniro	Natsuo Giniro (composer); Satoshi Takebe (arranger)	4:35
Total length:				8:18
