= Opha Pauline Dube =

Motswana environmental scientist

Pauline Dube
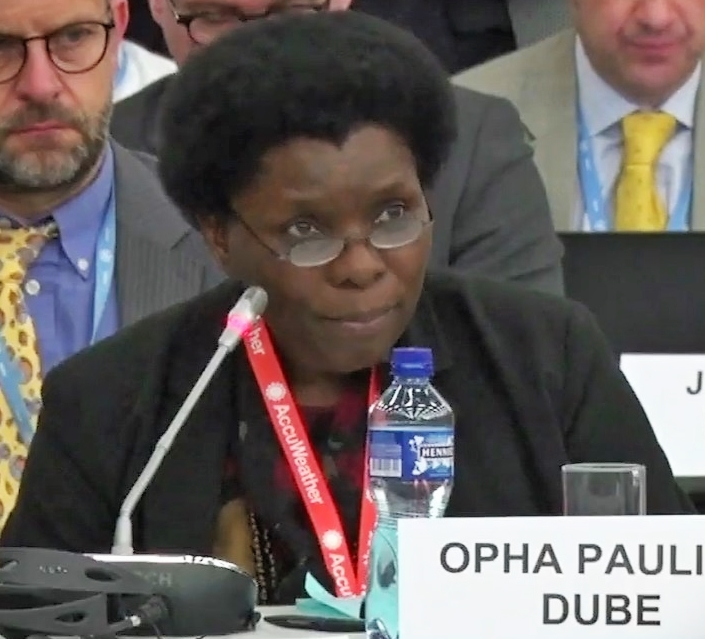
- Dube speaks at the World Meteorological Organization in 2019
- Born: Opha Pauline Dube; 1960 (age 65–66)
- Education: Cranfield University (MPhil); University of Queensland (PhD)
- Occupation: Associate Professor
- Known for: Leading environmental scientist, who co-authored the IPCC Special Report on Global Warming of 1.5 °C
- Website: Official website

Opha Pauline Dube (born 1960) is a Motswana environmental scientist and Associate Professor in the Department of Environmental Science at the University of Botswana. She co-authored the IPCC's Special Report on Global Warming of 1.5 °C. She is one of fifteen scientists creating the 2023 Global Sustainable Development Report for the United Nations.

== Education ==
Dube was awarded her MPhil in Applied Remote Sensing at the Cranfield Institute of Technology in the UK in 1989. She graduated with a PhD from the University of Queensland in 2000. She earned her doctorate due to a collaboration between the University of Botswana and the University of Queensland arranged by the Commonwealth Scientific and Industrial Research Organisation. The work involved investigating whether remote sensing-based methods used on Australian ranges could be applied to monitor land degradation in Botswana.

== Career and research ==
Dube is an associate professor in the Department of Environmental Science at the University of Botswana. Her research and teaching focuses on the social and biophysical aspects of global environmental change. In 2012, she held a research fellowship at the Australian National Climate Change Adaptation Research Facility (NCCARF) at Griffith University and had a similar position at the Environmental Change Institute at the University of Oxford in 2018.

Dube was Co-Vice Chair of the International Geosphere-Biosphere Programme (IGBP) between 2010 and 2015 and the Deputy Chair of Botswana National Climate Change Committee between 2017 and 2019. Dube is currently serving as the Co-Chair of the Scientific Advisory Committee of the Climate Research for Development in Africa (CR4D)-UNECA and the Vice Chair of the World Meteorological Organisation (WMO) Scientific Advisory Panel.

She is one of the Editors-in-Chief of the Elsevier Current Opinion in Environmental Sustainability academic journal and an associate editor of the CSIRO Rangeland Journal. In 2019, Dube was listed in the top 100 of "The World's Most Influential People in Climate Policy" and in October 2020, she was appointed by the UN Secretary General to be one of fifteen scientists creating the 2023 Global Sustainable Development Report for the United Nations.

Dube has served as part of the Intergovernmental Panel on Climate Change (IPCC) Working Group II since the Third Assessment Report. This group "assesses the vulnerability of socio-economic and natural systems to climate change, negative and positive consequences of climate change and options for adapting to it". She has contributed to the IPCC's Third, Fourth and Fifth Assessment Reports, acting as both an author and a review editor. Her work on the Climate Change 2007: Impacts, Adaptation, and Vulnerability (AR4 WG2) report, as part of the Fourth Assessment Report, led to Dube being awarded an International Nobel Peace Prize Certificate in 2007. She was also coordinating lead author for two of the IPCC's Special Reports: Managing the Risks of Extreme Events and Disasters to Advance Climate Change Adaptation (SREX) and Global Warming of 1.5 °C (SR15).

Dube worked as a review editor for the upcoming IPCC Sixth Assessment Report, on the chapter titled "Food, fibre, and other ecosystem products."

== Awards and honours ==
- 2007: Co-recipient of the International Nobel Peace Prize Certification
- 2018: "International Alumni of the Year" in the University of Queensland's annual Alumni Awards
- 2019: Listed in the top 100 "World's Most Influential People in Climate Policy"

== Selected publications ==
- Allen, M.R., O.P. Dube, W. Solecki, F. Aragón-Durand, W. Cramer, S. Humphreys, M. Kainuma, J. Kala, N. Mahowald, Y. Mulugetta, R. Perez, M.Wairiu, and K. Zickfeld, 2018. Framing and Context. In: Global Warming of 1.5°C. An IPCC Special Report on the impacts of global warming of 1.5°C above pre-industrial levels and related global greenhouse gas emission pathways, in the context of strengthening the global response to the threat of climate change, sustainable development, and efforts to eradicate poverty [Masson-Delmotte, V. et al. (eds.)]. In Press.
- Maru, Y.T., M.S. Smith, A. Sparrow, P.F. Pinho, O.P. Dube, 2014. A linked vulnerability and resilience framework for adaptation pathways in remote disadvantaged communities. Global Environmental Change, 28, 337–350. doi:10.1016/j.gloenvcha.2013.12.007
- Dube, O.P., 2009. Linking fire and climate: interactions with land use, vegetation, and soil. Current Opinion in Environmental Sustainability, 1 (2), 161-169. doi.org/10.1016/j.cosust.2009.10.008
- Fischlin, A., G.F. Midgley, J.T. Price, R. Leemans, B. Gopal, C. Turley, M.D.A. Rounsevell, O.P. Dube, J. Tarazona, A.A. Velichko, 2007. Ecosystems, their properties, goods, and services. In: Climate Change 2007: Impacts, Adaptation and Vulnerability. Contribution of Working Group II to the Fourth Assessment Report of the Intergovernmental Panel on Climate Change, [Parry, M.L. et al. eds.]. Cambridge University Press, Cambridge, pp. 211–272.
