= Jōnetsu =

Jōnetsu (情熱, lit. "Passion") is a Japanese word and may refer to:

- "Jōnetsu" (Kinki Kids song), a 2001 single by Japanese singing duo Kinki Kids
- "Jōnetsu" (Miliyah Kato song), a 2005 single by Japanese singer Miliyah Kato (and a cover of the Ua song)
- "Jōnetsu" (Ua song), a 1996 single from Japanese singer Ua
- "Jōnetsu" (Yuki Saito song), a 1985 single from Japanese singer Yuki Saito

See also

- "Jōnetsu no Bara", a 1990 single from the Japanese rock band The Blue Hearts
- "Jōnetsu no Daishō/Escape", a 2008 single by the Japanese band Girl Next Door
- "Jōnetsu no Kaze", a 2007 single by the Jpop group The Inazuma Sentai
