= Kanashimi yo Konnichi wa =

1986 single by Yuki Saito

"Kanashimi yo Konnichi wa 悲しみよこんにちは"
- Cover of single release of Kanashimi yo Konnichi wa.

Single by Yuki Saito

from the album Chime
- A-side: "Kanashimi yo Konnichi wa"
- B-side: "Ohikkoshi, Wasuremono"
- Released: March 21, 1986
- Genre: J-pop
- Length: 3:57
- Label: Canyon Records
- Composer: Kōji Tamaki
- Lyricist: Yukinojo Mori

Yuki Saito singles chronology
"Jōnetsu" (1985)	"Kanashimi yo Konnichi wa 悲しみよこんにちは" (1986)	"Doyōbi no Tamanegi" (1986)

"Kanashimi yo Konnichi wa" (悲しみよこんにちは; lit. "Hello Sadness") is the fifth single by Japanese singer Yuki Saito. Written by Yukinojo Mori and Kōji Tamaki, the single was released March 21, 1986, by Canyon Records together with "Ohikkoshi, Wasuremono" (お引越し・忘れもの; lit. "Moving, Lost Things").

== Background and release ==
"Kanashimi yo Konnichi wa" was used as the first opening theme of the anime TV series Maison Ikkoku. It was used in a total of 36 episodes (through episode 37, with the exception of episode 24 which had a different theme song). The song was also used as an image song for a line of Shiseido hair care products. (Note: The cover of the single gives the following information just to the right of the title: CX-TV系放映「めそん一刻」主題歌 新星堂「モーニングフレッシュ」イメージ・ソング, which translates to "CX-TV Network televised Maison Ikkoku, Shinseido 'Morning Fresh' image song".)

The B-side release was "Ohikkoshi, Wasuremono", which was written by Saito and Toshio Kamei. (Note: These individuals are all listed on the album cover as well as the label on the vinyl EP itself.)

"Kanashimi yo Konnichi wa" peaked at No. 3 on Oricon's weekly singles chart. Additionally, it reached No. 19 in Oricon's overall sales for singles in 1986.

The original single sold 289,000 copies. It was later re-released as a mini CD single on April 29, 1988, and re-released as part of a 21st Century ver. on November 28, 2007.

== Track listing ==
All music is arranged by Satoshi Takebe.

EP (catalog #7A0562) CD single (catalog #S10A0035, released April 29, 1988)
No.	Title	Lyrics	Music	Length
1.	"Kanashimi yo Konnichi wa" ((悲しみよこんにちは; "Hello Sadness"))	Yukinojo Mori	Kōji Tamaki	3:57
2.	"Ohikkoshi, Wasuremono" ((お引越し・忘れもの; "Moving, Lost Things"))	Toshio Kamei	Yuki Saito	4:44
Total length:				8:41

=== Chart history ===
Chart (1986)	Release	Peak position
Oricon	"Kanashimi yo Konnichi wa / Ohikkoshi, Wasuremono"	3
The Best Ten	"Kanashimi yo Konnichi wa / Ohikkoshi, Wasuremono"	6

== 21st Century ver. ==
"Kanashimi yo Konnichi wa (21st Century ver.) 悲しみよこんにちは(21st century ver.)"
- Cover of single release of Kanashimi yo Konnichi wa (21st Century ver.) .

Single by Yuki Saito
- Released: November 28, 2007
- Genre: J-pop
- Length: 4:12
- Label: Team Entertainment
- Composer: Kōji Tamaki
- Lyricist: Yukinojo Mori
- Producer: Masayoshi Ōkawa

Yuki Saito singles chronology
"'Kaze no Mukō'" (2007)	"Kanashimi yo Konnichi wa (21st Century ver.) 悲しみよこんにちは(21st century ver.)" (2007)

Kanashimi yo Konnichi wa (21st Century ver.) is a rearranged single by Yuki Saito, released on November 28, 2007, through Team Entertainment. It features songs first released between 1985 and 1989 with the vocals and music remastered, rerecorded, and rearranged.

"Kazoku no Shokutaku" included here is from the 1987 album Fūmu, which reached #1 on the Oricon charts. While "21st Century ver." series album covers generally feature anime cover art, this release features a photo of Saito.

=== Track listing ===
All music is arranged by Taisuke Sawachika.

Maxi CD single (catalog #KDSD-00176)
No.	Title	Lyrics	Music	Length
1.	"Kanashimi yo Konnichi wa (21st Century ver.)" ((悲しみよこんにちは (21st Century ver.); "Hello Sadness"))	Yukinojo Mori	Kōji Tamaki	4:12
2.	"Yume no Naka e (21st Century ver.)" ((夢の中へ (21st Century ver.); "Into a Dream"))	Yōsui Inoue	Inoue	4:04
3.	"Shiroi Honō (21st Century ver.)" ((白い炎 (21st Century ver.); "White Flames"))	Mori	Tamaki	4:49
4.	"Kazoku no Shokutaku (21st Century ver.)" ((家族の食卓 (21st Century ver.); "Family Dining Table"))	Yuki Saito	Akira Okamoto	3:57
5.	"Kanashimi yo Konnichi wa: L.F.J.B Remix" (悲しみよこんにちは -L.F.J.B Remix-)	Mori	Tamaki	5:00
6.	"Yume no Naka e: Funta Remix" (夢の中へ -Funta Remix-)	Inoue	Inoue	3:55
7.	"Kanashimi yo Konnichi wa (21st century ver.)" (Instrumental)			4:12
8.	"Yume no Naka e (21st Century ver.)" (Instrumental)			4:04
9.	"Shiroi Honō (21st Century ver.)" (Instrumental)			4:49
10.	"Kazoku no Shokutaku (21st Century ver.)" (Instrumental)			3:57
Total length:				42:59

== Cover versions ==
Several artists have released cover versions of "Kanashimi yo Konnichi wa". In 2004, Sana covered the song in the musical arcade game Pop'n Music 11. J-pop artist Ayano Tsuji released a cover on the Words of Yukinojō tribute album, featuring songs with lyrics written by Yukinojō Mori. The album reached #47 on the Oricon charts and remained on the lists for four weeks.

On her 2006 compilation album Remember, pop singer and songwriter Mikuni Shimokawa released a cover version, reaching #66 on the Oricon charts and remaining charted for two weeks. Eriko Nakamura, as her character Haruka Amami from The Idolmaster game, sang a cover version on the album The Idolmaster Master Artist 01: Amami Haruka. The album reached #21 on the Oricon charts and remained on the list for 3 weeks.

Romi released a cover on her 2008 album Ano Uta. Two covers were released in 2009: Rie Tanaka (as her character Maria in the anime series Hayate the Combat Butler) sang a cover version on the Hayate the Combat Butler Character Cover CD, and race queen and singer Mao Makabe released a cover on the omnibus multi-artist album Ai Love J-Euro from Farm Records.

In 2010, three covers were released. From the anime series White Album, the character Yuki Morikawa (voiced by Aya Hirano) covered "Kanashimi yo Konnichi wa" on the character CD single Koiiro Sora. Sumi Shimamoto, the voice of Kyoko Otonashi from Maison Ikkoku, released a cover on her album Shimamoto Sumi Sings Her Legends. Singer and actor Yūzō Imai also released a cover on his album Kimi to Aruita Jikan.

On his album Offer Music Box, Kōji Tamaki—who composed the original song—covered the song in 2012.

Hiroko Moriguchi covered the song on her 2023 cover album Anison Covers.
