= Koisuru Onnatachi =

- DVD cover
- Directed by: Kazuki Ōmori
- Screenplay by: Kazuki Ōmori
- Based on: Koisuru Onnatachi by Saeko Himuro
- Produced by: Shōgo Tomiyama
- Starring: Yuki Saito; Mamiko Takai; Haruko Sagara; Satomi Kobayashi
- Cinematography: Takehisa Takarada
- Edited by: Michiko Ikeda
- Music by: Tetsurō Kashibuchi
- Production company: Toho
- Distributed by: Toho
- Release date: December 13, 1986 (Japan)
- Country: Japan
- Language: Japanese
- Box office: ¥950 million

Koisuru Onnatachi (恋する女たち), also known as Young Girls in Love, is a 1986 Japanese romantic comedy drama film written and directed by Kazuki Ōmori. It is based on a 1981 light novel of the same name by Saeko Himuro, about the coming of age of a young girl and her friends. The film stars Yuki Saito in the lead role, alongside Mamiko Takai, Haruko Sagara and Satomi Kobayashi. Koisuru Onnatachi was released by Toho on December 13, 1986, in Japan, where it became one of the top-grossing films of 1987. Its theme song, "MAY", was performed by Saito.

== Premise ==
A lighthearted coming-of-age story about first loves and broken hearts. Yuki Saito plays Takako Yoshioka, a young woman trying to figure out her own romantic woes in addition to those of her quirky friends.

== Cast ==
- Yuki Saito as Takako Yoshioka
- Mamiko Takai as Midoriko Enami
- Haruko Sagara as Teiko Shima
- Satomi Kobayashi as Masako
- Toshirō Yanagiba as Kinuko Kutsugake
- Kaori Sugawara as Motoshi Kanazaki
- Kiwako Harada as Hiroko Yoshioka
- Ikuji Nakamura as Hiroshi Kobayashi
- Yūko Watanabe as Erina
- Tetsu Sakai as Aki-bou
- Yūsuke Kawazu as Tsuyoshi Kanazaki
- Yuriko Hoshi as Teiko's mother
- Keizō Kanie as Teiko's father

== Production ==
The film was shot on location in Kanazawa in 1985 (the setting was changed from Yuzawa, Hokkaido in the novel).

== Awards ==
11th Japan Academy Awards

- Nominated: Best Director - Kazuki Ōmori
- Nominated: Best Screenwriter - Kazuki Ōmori
- Nominated: Best Actress - Yuki Saito

60th Kinema Junpo Best Ten Awards

- Best Ten List: 7th place
