= Rie Yamaguchi =

Japanese voice actress

Rie Yamaguchi 山口 理恵
- Born: October 20, 1986 (age 39); Nara Prefecture, Japan
- Occupation: Voice actress
- Years active: 2009-2017

Rie Yamaguchi (山口 理恵, Yamaguchi Rie; born October 20, 1986) is a former Japanese voice actress affiliated with 81 Produce. On March 1, 2017, she announced her retirement from voice acting.

== Voice roles ==
Bold denotes leading roles.

=== Anime ===
2009

- Element Hunters as Hannah Weber
- Nyan Koi! as Eiko Oota (ep 1–2, 7)
- Tokyo Magnitude 8.0 as Volunteer

2010

- Dance in the Vampire Bund as Yumi

2011

- Blood-C as Female student (ep 8–9)
- Chibi Devi! as Natsuki Takayama
- Freezing as Tris McKenzie
- Kamisama Dolls as Yurako Somaki
- Kore wa Zombie Desu ka? as Nurse (ep 5), Taeko Hiramatsu (she also did the ending theme, released as a single with a cover of Yuki Saito's Sotsugyō)
- Morita-san wa Mukuchi as Maki-sensei
- Sacred Seven as Ageha Yamaguchi

2012

- Kore wa Zombie Desu ka? of the Dead as Taeko Hiramatsu
- Saki Achiga-hen episode of Side-A as Shiori Mizumura

=== Video games ===
- School of Talent: SUZU-ROUTE as Suzu Yuki
