= Hanekonma =

Japanese TV-series

- Also known as: はね駒 or Rin (English language title)
- Genre: Asadora drama
- Starring: Yuki Saito; Kirin Kiki; Ken Watanabe; Nenji Kobayashi; Guts Ishimatsu; Shingo Yanagisawa; Shigeru Yazaki; Jun Miho; Eiko Nagashima; Hitomi Takahashi; Yurie Nitani; Tokue Hanasawa; Takeo Chii; Yumi Shirakawa; Yatsuko Tan'ami; Akira Yamanouchi; Kenji Sawada
- Narrated by: Toshiyuki Hosokawa
- Theme music composer: Shigeaki Saegusa
- Country of origin: Japan
- Original language: Japanese
- No. of episodes: 156

Production
- Running time: 15 minutes (per episode)
- Production company: NHK

Original release
- Network: NHK
- Release: April 7 – October 4, 1986

Hanekonma (はね駒) is a 1986 Japanese television serial, the 36th NHK asadora drama. Written by Koharu Terauchi, it was inspired by the life of Haruko Isomura (1877-1918), a pioneer female newspaper reporter of the Meiji and Taishō eras.

Like its predecessor, Oshin, an English-subtitled version of the serial, described as a "high-class soapie", was broadcast in Australia on SBS, under the title Rin, in 1988.

== Plot ==
Tachibana Rin, nicknamed "Hanekonma" (filly), grows up in Sōma, Fukushima. Together she and her mother scrape up enough money for her to attend a Christian girls' school in Sendai, Miyagi. Though disowned by her father, she studies English and, after some early struggles, becomes a teacher. Later she marries and moves to Tokyo. After her husband's business fails, and while juggling raising a family, she succeeds in becoming Japan's first female newspaper reporter.

== Development ==
Like a previous asadora early morning drama Oshin (1983), and a subsequent taiga evening drama Inochi (1988), Hanekonma reflected women’s history and was developed by NHK to appeal to female audiences.

== Cast ==
- Yuki Saito as Tachibana Rin
- Kirin Kiki as Tachibana Yae (Rin's mother)
- Nenji Kobayashi as Tachibana Kojirō (Rin's father)
- Ken Watanabe as Onodera Genzō (Rin's husband)
