= Is This a Zombie? =

Japanese light novel series

- Cover of the first volume of Kore wa Zombie Desu ka? as released by Fujimi Shobo featuring Haruna

これはゾンビですか? (Kore wa Zonbi Desu ka?)
- Genre: Dark comedy; Harem; Supernatural
- Light novel
- Written by: Shinichi Kimura
- Illustrated by: Kobuichi; Muririn
- Published by: Fujimi Shobo
- Imprint: Fujimi Fantasia Bunko
- Original run: January 20, 2009 – June 20, 2015
- Volumes: 19
- Manga
- Written by: Shinichi Kimura
- Illustrated by: Sacchi
- Published by: Fujimi Shobo
- English publisher: NA: Yen Press
- Magazine: Monthly Dragon Age
- Original run: January 9, 2010 – November 9, 2013
- Volumes: 8
- Anime television series
- Directed by: Takaomi Kanasaki
- Produced by: Satoshi Fujita; Seiichi Hachiya; Seiichi Kawashima; Tomoki Numata
- Written by: Makoto Uezu
- Music by: Shinji Kakishima
- Studio: Studio Deen
- Licensed by: NA: Crunchyroll, LLC; UK: MVM Films
- Original network: TVS, GBS, CTC, SUN, KBS, MTV, Tokyo MX, tvk, TVQ, AT-X
- English network: US: Funimation Channel, Chiller
- Original run: January 11, 2011 – March 30, 2011
- Episodes: 12 + OVA
- Anime television series

Is This a Zombie? of the Dead
- Directed by: Takaomi Kanasaki
- Written by: Makoto Uezu
- Music by: Shinji Kakijima
- Studio: Studio Deen
- Licensed by: NA: Crunchyroll, LLC; UK: MVM Films
- Original network: Tokyo MX, TVQ, SUN, GBS, MTV, BS11, CTC, tvk, TVS, AT-X
- Original run: April 5, 2012 – June 7, 2012
- Episodes: 10 + 2 OVA
- icon

Is this a Zombie? (Japanese: これはゾンビですか?, Hepburn: Kore wa Zonbi Desu ka?), also known as Korezom (これゾン, Korezon) for short, is a Japanese light novel series by Shinichi Kimura, with illustrations by Kobuichi and Muririn. Since January 2009, 19 volumes have been published by Fujimi Shobo under their Fujimi Fantasia Bunko imprint. There are five different manga adaptations based on the universe of Kore wa Zombie Desu ka?. A 12-episode anime adaptation produced by Studio Deen aired in Japan from January 11, 2011, to March 31, 2011, on Television Saitama and other networks. A second season, titled Kore wa Zombie Desu ka? Of the Dead (これはゾンビですか? オブザデッド, Kore wa Zonbi Desu ka? Obu za Deddo), aired in Japan from April 5, 2012, to June 7, 2012, on Tokyo MX and other networks.

== Plot ==
Ayumu Aikawa was once an ordinary high schooler resurrected as a zombie by a necromancer named Eucliwood Hellscythe after being murdered by a serial killer. As he tries to make the best of his undead life, he encounters a Masō-Shōjo (魔装少女; lit. Magical Garment Girl, a pun on "mahō shōjo," meaning magical girl) named Haruna and inadvertently takes her magic powers, being forced to become a Masō-Shōjo (and therefore crossdress) in the process. With Eucliwood, Haruna, and a vampire ninja named Seraphim living with him, Ayumu helps battle demons known as Megalos while trying to figure out the mystery behind his own death.

== Characters ==
=== Main characters ===
Ayumu Aikawa (相川 歩, Aikawa Ayumu)
Voiced by: Takuma Terashima (drama CD), Junji Majima (anime) (Japanese); Austin Tindle (English)
Ayumu is a high school boy who was killed by a serial killer and resurrected as a zombie by the Necromancer, Eucliwood Hellscythe. As a zombie, he is near invincible and can exceed the limits of the human body, giving him great physical strength, but he will dry out in the sunlight. There are other aspects of his zombie nature that Ayumu has yet to discover, such as the ability to absorb magic (stronger magic absorbs weaker magic). As a result of absorbing Haruna's magic, Ayumu is forced to become a Masō-Shōjo, pink frilly outfit and all, to fight Megalos, and loses some of the associated negative effects such as the weakness to sunlight. When Mystletainn recognizes Haruna as its owner again, it enables both of them to transform into Masō-Shōjos in tandem, right before they fight Yoruno. He is also more aggressive in the manga, as seen in his fight against Kyoko when it takes the appearance and intervention of Ariel to prevent him from killing her. In the anime, he refrains from killing her for good after realizing that she was down to her very last life. Ayumu has a hidden talent; he's able to break-dance. When he had his memory erased, the sloth aspect known as Belphegor took over his body. Ever since Ayumu became a zombie, he has encountered many different girls, some antagonists included, who have gained a rather complicated interest in him.
At the end of the light novel, he is now working as a salaryman and quietly lives with his (girl) friends.
Eucliwood Hellscythe (ユークリウッド・ヘルサイズ, Yūkuriuddo Herusaizu)
Voiced by: Yukari Tamura (drama CD), Midori Tsukimiya (anime) (Japanese); Cherami Leigh (English)
Eucliwood, called Eu (ユー, Yū) for short, is a silver-haired necromancer who brought Ayumu back to life to be her servant and has been living with him ever since. Her magic is so powerful that she has to wear heavy armor and suppress her emotions to control it. Her words also carry strong magic, and she can kill someone just by saying the word "Die." Because of this, she avoids talking and instead communicates through written notes, mostly about her appetite. She experiences severe pain whenever her magic is activated, and she claims that even if she were to die, her magic would continue uncontrolled. She doesn't like people talking about death or telling someone to die since (as she takes on the pain of anyone she heals, revives, or kills) she understands the pain of dying, despite being immortal herself. Even though she considers Ayumu to be her servant, she's shown to care about him and has admitted that she's in love with him but can't express her feelings. Ayumu comforts her whenever she thinks about her insecurity, and she is shown to take these feelings to heart. Ayumu often daydreams about her behaving like a visual novel character and speaking in a cutesy manner (voiced by a different voice actress in each episode of the anime). She can also become a Masō-Shōjo, and it is implied that she interned at Matellis, under Ariel. In Episode 11, she spoke to Ayumu for the first time, indicating that she had gained some control over her magic. How or what she did to control it is a mystery; however, she sometimes doesn't realise she can handle it despite having done it before.
Haruna (ハルナ)
Voiced by: Kaoru Mizuhara (drama CD), Iori Nomizu (anime) (Japanese); Jad Saxton (English)
Haruna is a Masō-Shōjo from Villiers who wields a chainsaw named Mystletainn (ミストルティン, Misutorutin) to battle demons known as Megalos. She can also use her magic to repair damage caused by her battles and erase people's memories, the latter ability which becomes useful to Ayumu (to avoid exposing himself crossdressing). After first encountering Ayumu, following a fight with a demon, Haruna's magical powers were absorbed by him; due to the fact the magic Eu used to revive him is stronger than hers. As Haruna tries to figure out this situation, she appoints Ayumu to fight the Megalos in her place as a Masō-Shōjo and also starts living with him. She is a great cook, though it's usually limited to just making fried eggs (so delicious that people are surprised that there is nothing else mixed in). Haruna is shown to be beating up Ayumu and getting upset over certain things. Despite being a self-proclaimed genius, she has trouble remembering important details of assignments since she only remembers what she deems interesting and omits everything else. Haruna appears to have some romantic feelings for Ayumu, having a dream of kissing him and later asking him to kiss her. She's even jealous of Mael's relationship with Ayumu, particularly whenever he's too close to her. In the last chapter of the manga, Haruna kisses Ayumu twice proclaiming herself the "winner" and later stating that she and Ayumu are "going out." Eventually, Mystletainn recognized her as its owner again, enabling her and Ayumu to transform into Masō-Shōjos in tandem for the final battle against Yoruno.
When Iori Nomizu was asked which part of her was similar to Haruna, the character she was voicing, she stated that she and Haruna were both very energetic.
Seraphim (セラフィム, Serafimu)
Voiced by: Shizuka Itō (drama CD), Yōko Hikasa (anime) (Japanese); Morgan Lauré Garrett (English)
Seraphim "Sera" (セラ) for short, is a black-haired well-endowed vampire ninja (吸血忍者, Kyūketsu-ninja) who combines her Secret Sword Technique: Swallow Cut, and ninja reflexes with her vampire powers to fight her enemies. She can form a pair of bat wings and a katana out of leaves. Her signature outfit consists of a yellow spaghetti-strapped top (that reveals her midriff) and dark blue jeans (this outfit is the one she wears most often in promotional material). As a vampire, Sera periodically requires blood to stay alive and can anesthetize people with a kiss to numb the pain from neck bites. She does this to girls only since kissing a boy would symbolize marriage according to her faction's rules. She comes to Ayumu's house to serve Eu, though when rejected, she becomes Ayumu's servant in hopes that she can change Eu's mind. She, however, is indifferent towards Ayumu, constantly calling him a dung beetle (クソ虫, Kuso-mushi; "maggot" in the Funimation English adaptation), though has a healthy respect for his combat and magic abilities. Sera also cooks the most out of her friends. However, she is terrible at it; its consumers usually either pass out or are taken to the hospital due to eating Sera's bizarre meals, which are seen in Mael and Orito's cases. Sera has a brief argument with Ayumu over her participation in Saras' assassination attempt on Eu and, on moral grounds, decides to let Eu live. However, Sera is killed by Yoruno, only to be resurrected when Eu pricks her own finger to supply blood for her — blood which makes her the key to sealing the gates of the underworld. Kyoko reveals that Sera is a tsundere and masks her true feelings, especially when it comes to Ayumu.
Mael Strom (メイル・シュトローム, Meiru Shutorōmu) / Yuki Yoshida (吉田 友紀, Yoshida Yuki)
Voiced by: Mamiko Noto (drama CD), Hisako Kanemoto (anime) (Japanese); Brittney Karbowski (English)
Mael is a blonde vampire ninja from a different faction than Sera's, who's also a student in Ayumu's high school, where she's known as Yuki Yoshida. Because of how this name is written, she is often nicknamed "Tomonori" (トモノリ), but she only allows Ayumu to call her by that name. Yuki has a giant flame spirit inside her, named Mysticore. When she loses control, it will take over her consciousness and go on a rampage, destroying everything nearby. As a result of accidentally kissing Ayumu when he was pushed onto her by Haruna, they are technically married by her faction's customs, and she acts like his wife while at school. Even though initially, she only accepts her position as his wife due to tradition, she eventually develops strong feelings for Ayumu due to his kind and daring persona. Ayumu doesn't seem to take it very seriously, but Yuki says that she's always wanted to be married. She is somewhat tomboyish, speaking with the term "ore" when referring to herself. Mael can use tonkotsu ramen soup to instantly defeat Megalos, though the explanation behind it is too advanced even for her to understand. She even has a machine that sprays the same soup over the city should a horde of Megalos attack. However, in the anime, the machine had failed (it is hinted that Sera's faction had destroyed it because it might upset the natural environment when used), and thus the project was abandoned. In Season 2, Ayumu gives Mael a ring that suppresses Mysticore, though she mistakes it for a wedding ring.
Sarasvati (サラスバティ, Sarasubati) / Kirara Hoshikawa (星川 輝羅々, Hoshikawa Kirara)
Voiced by: Aya Gōda (Japanese); Caitlin Glass (English)
Sarasvati, "Saras" (サラス, Sarasu) for short, is a vampire ninja and Sera's superior who lives in the human world as Kirara Hoshikawa. She's also known as Lovely Kirara, leading a "double" life as an idol singer who is very popular in the human world. Known as an earnest individual who exudes a great deal of authority and iron will, she has Sera attempt to assassinate Eu for being a Megalo magnet. However, Saras sets Sera's execution for failing to follow her orders. Later, Saras saves her and Haruna from Yoruno. She revokes her mission, following the success of her and Mael's combined factions in sealing the gates of the Underworld (though Sera was ultimately the key since she had Eu's blood flowing through her veins after a fatal injury incurred by Yoruno). Saras owns a cafe, where Ayumu and Orito take the "tsundere challenge" to conquer the girls there. Eventually, she falls in love with Ayumu (to be more precise, lust at first sight when she sees his butt and curve lines, but properly falls in love with him nonetheless). She invites Ayumu to her concert. Saras says that she's glad since Ayumu was able to fulfill his promise and indirectly kisses him. This results in her being married to Ayumu according to her customs.

=== Antagonists ===
Kyoko (京子, Kyōko)
Voiced by: Noriko Shitaya (Japanese); Lindsay Seidel (English)
First introduced as a supposed childhood friend of Ayumu's classmate, Orito, and a survivor of the serial killer attacks. In actuality, she is a Masō-Shōjo and the serial killer responsible for killing Ayumu. By killing various humans and sacrificing their souls, she can add those lives to her own, allowing herself to be revived if she is killed. She seems to display yandere-like tendencies at times. It is later revealed she is being possessed by the King of the Night. Following her defeat by Ayumu, he shows her mercy by refusing to kill her for good once she is down to her last life. She is imprisoned for re-education after Ariel shows up to congratulate Ayumu for being merciful in defeating her, warning him that she would have killed him in retaliation if Ayumu had killed her. She is later arrested by Dai-sensei but later is let out to help with Chris's situation and let Ayumu know she truly loves him.
King of the Night (夜の王, Yoru no Ō)
Voiced by: Koji Yusa (Japanese); Eric Vale (Season 1), J. Michael Tatum (Season 2) (English)
A former zombie that was brought back to life by Eucliwood, who also goes by the alias "Yoruno" (夜野). According to her, his heart became filled with malice and she had to kill him, but it appears he is still alive. He has the same zombie eye expression as Ayumu. In episode 10, he can kill Seraphim for failing her assassination attempt on Eu, though Eu brings her back with her blood. In episode 11, he realized that what he did to Eu was wrong and said to Ayumu that "in time you will understand the hardships of living an immortal life." He again desperately begs for Eu to kill him, saying that he can't take it anymore. His last request is to be a penguin in his next life because he likes penguins. It is hinted that King of the Night doesn't loathe immortality by itself but rather being an immortal yet unable to be with Eu (because he killed a fellow Seventh Abyss).
Chris (クリス, Kurisu) / Takeshi Kurisu (栗須 猛, Kurisu Takeshi)
Voiced by: Hitomi Nabatame (Japanese); Stephanie Sheh (English) (Chris) Voiced by: Daisuke Kishio (Japanese); Kent Williams (English) (Kurisu)
Takeshi Kurisu seems to be Ayumu's teacher, but she is Villiers' strongest Masō-Shōjo, Chris. Not much was known about her at first other than being a wanderer at Ayumu's school who involuntarily became Ayumu's "imaginary" confidant, usually residing in a storage room, where Ayumu goes to talk to her about problems revolving around him. However, Chris is usually drunk and more preoccupied with her bottles of sake. It is revealed later that she also used to be Ariel's mentor, but was turned into a plain, middle-aged man by the Queen's curse - because she was purported to be the leader of a coup, which in fact, Ariel concocted the coup a century before the events of the series. Since then, she has been plotting her revenge against Ariel for letting her take the fall (along with some of the others involved in the coup). Due to her strength and her status as a villain, she can be considered the Masō-Shōjo that all Masō-Shōjos fear. Thanks to her friend Naegleria's ability to cancel magic, she can turn back to a Masō-Shōjo while she's drunk. Due to Ayumu always coming to talk to her, she seems to have developed a slight liking to him, even calling him a good drinking buddy in the anime and saying she will be waiting for him to join her for a drink.

=== Other characters ===
Tulio Orito (織戸 闘莉王, Orito Tūrio)
Voiced by: Shinya Takahashi (drama CD), Hiroyuki Yoshino (anime) (Japanese); Anthony Bowling (English)
Ayumu's classmate and friend who is often jealous of Ayumu's current situation of living with three lovely ladies. He briefly knew about Ayumu's (then-new) double life as a Masō-Shōjo. Still, fortunately, as revealed at the start of Episode 2, Ayumu erased his memory of the incident, along with those of the other students, and presumably erased himself from all the pictures they took of the incident as well as all copies they presumably sent to their friends.
Taeko Hiramatsu (平松 妙子, Hiramatsu Taeko)
Voiced by: Rie Yamaguchi (Japanese); Erica Harte (English)
Taeko is Ayumu's classmate and Yuki and Kanami's best friend. She's a cute girl with twin tails and one of the few people in the class (during the beginning of the series) who'll talk with Ayumu. She also has strong romantic feelings for Ayumu, so she wears twin-tails (since Ayumu likes girls with twin tails).
Kanami Mihara (三原 かなみ, Mihara Kanami)
Voiced by: Mina (Japanese); Emerick Jade (English)
Kanami is Ayumu's classmate and Yuki and Taeko's best friend. On Saras' "Unlock 'Dere Dere' Side of Five Maid Cafe's Maids," she's the last contestant whom even Ayumu couldn't beat; however, she was beaten by Orito's rather forward statement (shouting to her, "I Love You, Kanami"), catching her off guard and affecting her deeply (which may be a hint of a possible crush on him).
Shimomura (下村)
Voiced by: Itsuki Takizawa (Japanese); Todd Haberkorn (English)
Often called Anderson-kun (アンダーソンくん, Andāson-kun) by Ayumu, Shinomura is Ayumu's classmate and the school playboy, who is, in reality, a resident of the Underworld (possibly of high ranking, since he addresses Eu without any honorific), although studying abroad on Earth. He seems to tend to tease people, though he's very kind.
Ariel (アリエル, Arieru) / Dai-sensei (大先生; lit. "Great Teacher" and she is called "Head Teacher" in the English Dub)
Voiced by: Ai Shimizu (Japanese); Monica Rial (English)
Haruna's teacher at Matellis, who has an affinity for Kyoto-made tofu and sends Haruna to get her some due to her credit cards being overcharged. Her true motives are unknown, but she is very protective of her students and will kill anyone who harms them (even if they have committed a terrible crime). It is later revealed that she was formerly the second in command of Villiers and had planned to overthrow Lilia Lilith, the Queen of Villiers, a century before the series events, and appointed her mentor, Chris, as the leader of the coup. It ultimately failed, and Chris (along with a few others involved) took the fall, with Chris herself cursed into the form of a middle-aged man; however, Ariel herself apparently managed to escape punishment and was only demoted to a teacher instead.
Akuma Danshaku (悪魔男爵; lit. 'Baron Demon')
Voiced by: Tōru Ōkawa (Japanese); Mike McFarland (English)
Akuma Danshaku is the head of the Vampire-Ninjas. He often vomits blood since he was also cursed by the Queen, presumably after taking the fall, along with Chris, for participating in Ariel's failed rebellion. When he went missing after the fall, the Vampire Ninjas fell into several groups, while Seraphim was appointed the mission to search for him. He also participated in the making of the Vampire Ninjas' customs. According to him, the tradition of forced marriage is a safety measure as most female Vampire Ninjas would rather stay single.
Naegleria Nebiros (ネグレリア・ネビロス, Negureria Nebirosu)
Voiced by: Ami Koshimizu (Japanese); Kelly McHalen (English)
Naegleria is Eu's friend from the Underworld and a member of the former Seventh Abyss. She's recognized to be the Underworld's strongest. While on Earth, she's also known as the dōjinshi Nene (ネネ). Naegleria has a habit of falling asleep whenever she feels like it, at any place, at any pose, at any moment (even while standing upright, or even while walking out of the shower). She also has the largest bust size than any of the other female cast, including Sera's. Saras is also a big fan of her. Naegleria is also the one who made the magic gauntlets that keep Eu's magical powers in check. Later on, she's also the one who helps Chris transform back into her original Masō-Shōjo form while the latter is under the influence. Like Chris, she seems to have slightly liked Ayumu, saying she was almost willing to fight Chris for him.
Lilia Lilith (リリア・リリス, Riria Ririsu)
Voiced by: Mariko Honda (Japanese); Apphia Yu (English)
The Queen of Villiers who meted out punishment to Chris and Akuma (and a few other Masō-Shojōs) for their involvement in a coup Ariel concocted, but Ariel herself has since reformed following the incident and still teaches at Matellis. In anime, she seemed to have watched Ayumu's adventures through a mirror. In the later novel, Ayumu accidentally kissed her, which caused her to view Ayumu as a decent combatant and ordered Kyoko to curse Ayumu. She is infamous for adapting her Masō-Shōjo weapon after studying any personnel she viewed can challenge her as a countermeasure.
Meringue Salveria (メレンゲ・サルベリア, Merenge Saruberia)
Meringue is an owner of a ramen shop "Meringue" and a former member of the Seventh Abyss. She changed Orito into a Megalo to get Eu angry.

== Terminology ==
Villiers (ヴィリエ, Virie)
Villiers is a country ruled by a Queen that exists in a parallel universe. The country is ruled by a matriarchy, with an unconditional ruling of women. However, there is also roughly 20 percent of the population of males who are knowledgeable in magic. Villiers perform aggressive expansion over its neighboring territories while utilizing unique, powerful weapons for battle as a military nation. It is also the home of the Masō-Shōjos (for the majority of them, anyway), where the training school Matellis resides. A hundred years ago, Villiers experienced a coup d'état, led by Ariel (Dai-sensei) and followed by Chris and Akuma Danshaku. The current-ruling queen, Lilia Lilith, was able to thwart the plans to overthrow her. As a result, Chris, Akuma Danshaku, and many other Masō-Shōjos supporting the coup were punished; meanwhile, the true conspirator (Ariel/Dai-sensei) evaded punishment. Currently, Villiers and Underworld are sending Masō-Shōjos and Megalos to fight over in the human world. It is also hinted that Villers is now preparing a formal invasion.
Matellis
Matellis is a school in Villiers, where powerful unique girls train to become Masō-Shōjo. Currently, Ariel is the only known teacher. Haruna appears to be the 634,526,379th student, while Chris and Kyoko are both former students. Ayumu is also technically accepted as one of the students as he fights as a Masō-Shōjo for Haruna.
Masō-Shōjo (魔装少女; lit. "Magical Garment Girl"; English manga: "Magikewl Girl")
The Masō-Shōjos are magically-powered girls in cutesy girlish outfits (or in Ayumu's case, a guy in a dress), which grants them more powerful abilities. They achieve this transformation by using their own personal magically-powerful weapon (each Masō-Shōjo possesses her own unique magical weapon; although, as in Eu's case, some circumstances will allow a Masō-Shōjo to use a fellow Masō-Shōjo's own weapon), and reciting a specific incantation: Nomobuyo, Oshi, Hashitawa, Dokeda, Gunmīcha, Dēribura (ノモブヨ、ヲシ、ハシタワ、ドケダ、グンミーチャ、デーリブラ), which is backward for Raburī de Chāmingu Dakedo Watashi wa Shi o Yobu Mono (ラブリーでチャーミングだけど私は死を呼ぶ者), meaning "I'm Lovely and Charming, but I Summon Death." They're generally clad in frilly pink dresses and are responsible for hunting down Megalos. This power is obtained by training at Matellis, a school in Villiers.
Underworld
Underworld is a parallel universe where the dead go once they have died. It is also where Eucliwood is from.
Megalo (メガロ, Megaro)
The Megalos are recurring monsters, often shown in constant battle with Villiers' Masō-Shōjos. They are generally depicted as animals who wear gakurans. During the Second Season of the Anime, it is revealed that the Megalos were created by the Underworlders, and were designed to defend them against the Masō-Shōjo during the war between the two civilizations.
Seventh Abyss (セブンスアビス, Sebunsu Abisu)
The Seventh Abyss is a former special unit created to protect the Underworld from Villiers (and their Masō-Shōjos). It was made up of the strongest warriors of the Underworld; it was also formed way before the Megalo System was established. There were seven members, including Eucliwood Hellscythe, King of the Night, Naegleria Nebiros, Meringue Salveria, and a Captain. The Seventh Abyss was disbanded when King of the Night murdered the Captain. According to Shimomura, most of the members of the Seventh Abyss are known to be above Underworld laws, as they are too strong to be restricted.
Vampire Ninja (吸血忍者, Kyūketsu-Ninja)
The Vampire Ninjas are a class of vampires who are trained in ninjutsu. They are composed of many factions, who can oppose each other, and have unusual customs, including a kiss on the lips from the opposite sex as a sign of marriage. They live by their code and refrain from ever breaking it. The primary mission for Vampire Ninja is to protect the human world from other parallel universes. Following the reappearance of Akuma Danshaku, the former leader, Vampire Ninjas of different factions, is now merging.

== Media ==
=== Light novels ===
Kore wa Zombie Desu ka? began as a light novel series written by Shinichi Kimura, with illustrations provided by Kobuichi and Muririn. The first volume was published by Fujimi Shobo on January 20, 2009, with a total of 19 volumes published as of June 20, 2015, under their Fujimi Fantasia Bunko imprint.

No.	Title	Release date	ISBN
1	Is This a Zombie? Yes, I'm a Masō-Shōjo (これはゾンビですか? はい、魔装少女です, Kore wa Zonbi Desu ka? Hai, Masō-Shōjo Desu)	January 20, 2009	978-4-8291-3370-5
2	Is This a Zombie? Yes, I Am the Harbinger of Death (これはゾンビですか? そう、私は死を呼ぶもの, Kore wa Zonbi Desu ka? Sō, Watashi wa Shi o Yobu Mono)	May 20, 2009	978-4-8291-3370-5
3	Is This a Zombie? No, That Will Explode (これはゾンビですか? いえ、それは爆発します, Kore wa Zonbi Desu ka? Ie, Sore wa Bakuhatsu Shimasu)	September 20, 2009	978-4-8291-3442-9
4	Is This a Zombie? Yeah, I'm the Strongest Teacher! (これはゾンビですか? うん、先生が最強だよ!, Kore wa Zonbi Desu ka? Un, Sensei ga Saikyō Dayo!)	January 20, 2010	978-4-8291-3481-8
5	Is This a Zombie? Oh, My Darling is Good-For-Nothing (これはゾンビですか? ああ、マイダーリンはロクデナシ, Kore wa Zonbi Desu ka? Ā, Mai Dārin wa Rokudenashi)	May 20, 2010	978-4-8291-3524-2
6	Is This a Zombie? Yes, Both Are My Wives (これはゾンビですか? はい、どちらも嫁です, Kore wa Zonbi Desu ka? Hai, Dochira mo Yome Desu)	October 20, 2010	978-4-8291-3574-7
7	Is This a Zombie? Yes, She is the Sleeping Boobs (これはゾンビですか? はーい、眠れるチチです, Kore wa Zonbi Desu ka? Hāi, Nemureru Chichi Desu)	January 20, 2011	978-4-8291-3605-8
8	Is This a Zombie? Yes, I'm Sorry for Kissing You (これはゾンビですか? はい、キスしてごめんなさい, Kore wa Zonbi Desu ka? Hai, Kisu Shite Gomennasai)	June 10, 2011 (limited edition); June 18, 2011 (regular edition)	978-4-8291-9764-6 (limited edition); 978-4-8291-3650-8 (regular edition)
The limited edition release contained an OVA episode on DVD.
9	Is This a Zombie? Yes, I've Come To Bless (Curse) You (これはゾンビですか? はい、祝(呪)いに来ました, Kore wa Zonbi Desu ka? Hai, Iwa(noro)i ni Kimashita)	November 19, 2011	978-4-8291-3701-7
10	Is This a Zombie? Yes, I'm Lovely and Charming (これはゾンビですか? はい、ラブリーでチャーミングだけどあたしは, Kore wa Zonbi Desu ka? Hai, Raburī de Chāmingu Dakedo Atashi wa)	April 25, 2012 (limited edition); May 19, 2012 (regular edition)	978-4-8291-9766-0 (limited edition); 978-4-8291-3761-1 (regular edition)
The limited edition release contained an OVA episode on DVD.
11	Is This a Zombie? Yes, She's Meringue (これはゾンビですか? はい、メレンゲです, Kore wa Zonbi Desu ka? Hai, Merenge Desu)	October 20, 2012	978-4-8291-3811-3
12	Is This a Zombie? Yes, I Am the One Who Cries Love (これはゾンビですか? そう、私は愛を叫ぶ者, Kore wa Zonbi Desu ka? Sō, Watashi wa Ai o Sakebu Mono)	February 20, 2013	978-4-8291-3858-8
13	Is This a Zombie? No, It Does Not Have a Memory At All (これはゾンビですか? いいえ、全く記憶にございません, Kore wa Zonbi Desu ka? Iie, Mattaku Kioku ni Gozaimasen)	May 18, 2013	978-4-8291-3887-8
14	Is This a Zombie? Yes, I'm Withdrawal Anyway (これはゾンビですか? はい、どうせひきこもりだけど, Kore wa Zonbi Desu ka? Hai, Douse Hikikomori Dakedo)	October 19, 2013	978-4-04-712916-0
15	Is This a Zombie? Yes, Both Of Them Are Me (これはゾンビですか? はい、どっちもあたしです, Kore wa Zonbi Desu ka? Hai, Docchi mo Atashi Desu)	March 20, 2014	978-4-04-070063-2
16	Kore wa Zombie Desu ka? Oh, Especially Recently (これはゾンビですか? まあ、さいきんはとくに, Kore wa Zonbi Desu ka? Mā, saikin wa Toku ni)	August 20, 2014	978-4-04-070272-8
17	Is This a Zombie? No, I'm Not Gonna Die (これはゾンビですか? はい、ボクは死にましぇん, Kore wa Zonbi Desu ka? Hai, Boku wa Shinimashen)	November 20, 2014	978-4-04-070273-5
18	Is This a Zombie? Yes, I Will Return To General Peapo (これはゾンビですか? はい、一般ピーポーに戻ります, Kore wa Zonbi Desu ka? Hai, Ippan Pipo ni Modorimasu)	February 20, 2015	978-4-04-070274-2
19	Is This a Zombie? Yes, You're Not! (これはゾンビですか? はい、お前じゃねぇよ!, Kore wa Zonbi Desu ka? Hai, Omae ja Neyo!)	June 20, 2015	978-4-04-070604-7

=== Drama CD ===
A drama CD for Kore wa Zombie Desu ka? published by Marine Entertainment was released on December 30, 2009. The drama CD was released in both limited and regular editions. Both editions' first pressings came with a B2-sized poster. The limited edition also came with a booklet written by Shinichi Kimura and a telephone card illustrated by Kobuichi and Muririn.

=== Manga ===
A manga adaptation by Sacchi started serialization in the shōnen manga magazine Monthly Dragon Age on January 9, 2010. The first bound volume was released by Kadokawa Shoten on August 5, 2010, with 8 volumes available in Japan as of December 6, 2013. A 4-koma adaptation called Kore wa Zombie Desu ka? Yes, It's 4-koma Flavor. (これはゾンビですか? はい、4コマ風味です。, Kore wa Zonbi Desu ka? Hai, Yonkoma Fūmi Desu.), illustrated by Mūpa, and a third manga adaptation named Kore wa Zombie Desu ka? Yes, I'm your Wife. (これはゾンビですか? はい、アナタの嫁です。, Kore wa Zonbi Desu ka? Hai, Anata no Yome desu.), illustrated by Ryō Hasemi, are also being serialized in Monthly Dragon Age.

The manga by Sacchi is licensed in North America by Yen Press. The first volume in English was released on March 27, 2012, and as of July 22, 2014, all eight volumes have been published.

No.	Original release date	Original ISBN	English release date	English ISBN
1	August 5, 2010	978-4-04-712679-4	March 27, 2012	978-0-3162-1036-2
2	January 8, 2011	978-4-04-712707-4	July 24, 2012	978-0-3162-1037-9
3	July 8, 2011	978-4-04-712735-7	November 20, 2012	978-0-3162-1038-6
4	December 9, 2011	978-4-04-712763-0	April 23, 2013	978-0-31-624533-3
5	May 9, 2012	978-4-04-712796-8	July 23, 2013	978-0-31-625271-3
6	October 20, 2012 (limited edition); November 9, 2012 (regular edition)	978-4-04-712806-4 (limited edition); 978-4-04-712838-5 (regular edition)	October 29, 2013	978-0-316-24318-6
The Japanese limited edition release contained an OVA episode on Blu-ray Disc.
7	May 9, 2013	978-4-04-712870-5	February 18, 2014	978-0-316-36904-6
8	December 6, 2013	978-4-04-712963-4	July 22, 2014	978-0-316-37677-8

=== Anime ===
An anime adaptation of Is This a Zombie?, first announced on May 17, 2010, was produced by Studio Deen and aired 12 episodes on TV Saitama, Chiba TV, and Sun TV from January 10 to April 4, 2011, with subsequent broadcasts on Gifu Broadcasting System, Inc., KBS Kyoto, Mie TV, Tokyo MX, TV Kanagawa, TVQ, Nico Nico Channel, and AT-X. Episodes 10 and later were pushed back a week due to the 2011 Tōhoku earthquake and tsunami. The series was also simulcast by Crunchyroll on their streaming site. An OVA 13th episode was released on DVD with the eighth light novel on June 10, 2011. The anime is licensed in North America by Funimation (now known as Crunchyroll LLC) and released the series on December 4, 2012. American television network Chiller began airing the show on its Anime Wednesdays block on July 15, 2015. Chiller abruptly ended its "Anime Wednesday" block less than a month afterwards.

A second anime season, titled Is This a Zombie? of the Dead (これはゾンビですか? オブザデッド, Kore wa Zonbi Desu ka? Obu za Deddo), first announced in the July issue of Monthly Dragon Age, aired on Tokyo MX from April 5, 2012, to June 7, 2012, with subsequent broadcast runs on TVQ, Sun TV, Gifu Broadcasting System, Inc., Mie TV, BS11, Chiba TV, TV Kanagawa, TV Saitama and AT-X. An OVA episode was released with the tenth light novel volume on DVD on April 25, 2012, while the eleventh episode was released with the sixth manga volume on October 20, 2012, on Blu-ray. The second season is licensed by Funimation/Crunchyroll LLC for simulcast on their video portals. MVM Films have licensed both series in the United Kingdom.

The opening theme is "Leave-It-To-Me Tonight" (魔・カ・セ・テ Tonight, Ma-Ka-Se-Te Tonight) by Iori Nomizu. The ending theme is "Notice Me, Mr. Zombie, I am your Classmate" (気づいてゾンビさま、私はクラスメイトです, Kizuite Zonbi-sama, Watashi wa Kurasumeito Desu) by Rie Yamaguchi with Manzo. The opening theme for the second season is "Passionato" (パショナート, Pashonāto) by Iori Nomizu, while the ending theme is "I'm a Beginner at Love (T_T)" (恋のビギナーなんです（T_T）, Koi no Beginā Nan Desu (T_T)) by Rie Yamaguchi.

=== Appearances in other media ===
Haruna's uniform is available as an unlockable costume for main character Juliet Starling in the 2012 video game, Lollipop Chainsaw.

== Reception ==
Kore wa Zombie Desu ka? was recognized in Fujimi Shobo's 20th Fantasia Awards for long-running novels as an honourable mention.
