= Mikiko =

- Gender: Female

Origin
- Origin: Japanese
- Meaning: Different meanings depending on the kanji used

Mikiko (written: 幹子, 美樹子, 美起子, 美紀子, 美希子 or みきこ in hiragana) is a feminine Japanese given name. Notable people with the name include:

- Mikiko Ando (安藤 美希子; born 1992), Japanese weightlifter
- Mikiko Enomoto (榎本 充希子; born 1973), Japanese voice actress
- Mikiko Futagami (二上 美紀子; born 1969), Japanese retired professional wrestler
- Mikiko Hagiwara (萩原 美樹子; born 1970), Japanese women's basketball player
- Mikiko Hara (原 美樹子; born 1967), Japanese photographer
- Mikiko Kainuma (甲斐沼 美紀子; born 1950), Japanese climatologist
- Mikiko Kato (加藤 美起子; born 1954), Japanese handball player
- Mikiko Miki (三輝 みきこ), Japanese actress
- Mikiko Mizuno (水野幹子), known professionally as MIKIKO, Japanese choreographer
- Mikiko Otani (大谷 美紀子; born 1964), Japanese international human rights lawyer, and women's and children's rights advocate
- Mikiko Ponczeck (born 1984), German-Japanese comic book artist
- Mikiko Shiroma (城間 幹子; born 1951), Japanese politician
- Mikiko Sone (曽根 幹子; born 1952), Japanese high jumper
- Mikiko Takada (高田 幹子; born 1955), Japanese former badminton player
- Mikiko Takeya (竹屋 美紀子; born 1980), Japanese sprint canoeist
- Mikiko Terui (照井 美喜子; born 1952), Japanese cross-country skier
