= Mikiko Kainuma =

Japanese climatologist (born 1950)

- Born: 1950 (age 75–76); Japan
- Known for: climatology

Mikiko Kainuma (甲斐沼 美紀子) (born 1950) is a Japanese climatologist at the Japan Advanced Institute of Science and Technology. She is primarily known for her work on climate change and climate policy. She is a lead Japanese author on the 4th and 5th IPCC assessment reports.

== Career ==
Kainuma received her B.S., M.S., and Ph.D. degrees in applied mathematics and physics from Kyoto University, Japan. Since 1977, she has worked on air pollution and climate change at the National Institute for Environmental Studies (NIES), where she is currently the Chief of Climate Policy Assessment Research Section. She is a lead author on the Fourth and Fifth Assessment Report of the United Nations Intergovernmental Panel on Climate Change (IPCC).

Her projects include the Asia-Pacific Integrated Model (AIM) and the Integrated Environmental Assessment sub-project of the Asia-Pacific Environmental Innovation Project (APEIS).

In 2022, Kainumar received the Lifetime Achievement Award from the Integrated Assessment Modeling Consortium (IAMC).

== Main publications ==
- R. H. Moss u. a.: The next generation of scenarios for climate change research and assessment. In: Nature. Band 463, Nr. 7282, 2010, S. 747, doi:10.1038/nature08823
- M. Kainuma, Y. Matsuoka und T. Morita (Hrsg.): Climate policy assessment: Asia-Pacific integrated modeling. Springer Science & Business Media, 2011, ISBN 9784431679790
- D. P. Van Vuuren u. a.: The representative concentration pathways: an overview. In: Climatic Change. Band 109, Nr. 1–2, 2011, S. 5, doi:10.1007/s10584-011-0148-z
- Toshihiko Masui, Go Hibino, Junichi Fujino, Yuzuru Matsuoka, Mikiko Kainuma. Carbon dioxide reduction potential and economic impacts in Japan: application of AIM. Environmental Economics and Policy Studies. 2006. 7. 3. 271-284
- Toshihiko Masui, Yuzuru Matsuoka, Mikiko Kainuma. Long-term CO_{2} emission reduction scenarios in Japan. Environmental Economics and Policy Studies. 2006. 7. 3. 347-366
- Hanaoka Tatsuya, Kawase Reina, Kainuma Mikiko, Mastuoka Yuzuru. Regional Mitigation Analysis of Post-SRES Scenarios based on the updated Emissions Scenarios Database. Doboku Gakkai Ronbunshuu G. 2005. 33. 221-232
- Fujino Junichi, Kainuma Mikiko, Matsuoka Yuzuru, Matsui Shigekazu. 8-4 Development of AIM-Trend model to prospect energy demand in Asian-Pacific countries. Proceedings of the Annual Conference of The Japan Institute of Energy. 2001. 10. 471-474
