= Kōji Tamaki =

Japanese singer-songwriter

Kōji Tamaki 玉置 浩二
- Born: September 13, 1958 (age 67); Asahikawa, Hokkaido, Japan
- Genres: Pop rock, folk rock
- Occupations: Singer, composer, actor, lyricist
- Instruments: Vocal, guitar
- Years active: 1973–2008, 2009–present
- Labels: Sony Music Entertainment Japan, Kitty Records, BMG Japan, Universal Music Japan
- Website: saltmoderate.com

YouTube information
- Channel: 【公式】玉置浩二 Koji Tamaki SALTMODERATE
- Years active: 2019–present
- Subscribers: 334 thousand
- Views: 210 million
- Last updated: 4 August 2026

Kōji Tamaki (玉置 浩二, Tamaki Kōji; born September 13, 1958) is a Japanese singer-songwriter and actor. He has been well known as frontman of the rock band Anzen Chitai that debuted in 1982 and enjoyed a successful career, particularly during the 1980s. In the 1990s, he also began his career as a solo artist. He is widely regarded as one of the greatest Japanese vocalists.

In 2014, he was ranked first by a panel of 200 experts for the best ever singing voice in Japan. Moreover, in 2021 Koji was voted as the greatest active male Japanese singer, with 190 experts agreeing that he is a "living national treasure of music" and that he portrays an "unparalleled mass of expressiveness and emotion which only seems to get better with age".

== Biography ==
As a vocalist and a songwriter of Anzen Chitai, Tamaki spawned multiple successful compositions which were mostly co-written by lyricists including Gorō Matsui and Yōsui Inoue before the group suspended activities in 1993.

In 1987, Tamaki released his first solo single "All I Do" and continued his solo career after Anzen Chitai went into hiatus (1993–2001, 2004–2009). Throughout his solo career, he has released 23 singles and over a dozen studio albums. His song "Den-En," released as a single in 1996, became a massive hit, reaching number two on the Japanese Oricon charts and selling in excess of 900,000 copies.

Tamaki has also been known as an actor who has appeared in seven feature films and numerous television dramas. He began his acting career starring in the 1986 motion picture "Prussian Blue no Shozo."

Anzen Chitai returned from a hiatus and released their new single "Aoi Bara/Wine Red no Kokoro (2010 version)" on March 3, 2010.

On his 2012 album Offer Music Box, Tamaki — who composed the original song — covered Yuki Saito's song "Kanashimi yo Konnichi wa", which was used as the first theme song for the anime television series Maison Ikkoku.

== Discography ==
=== Albums ===
==== Studio albums ====
Year	Album	Label	Chart positions
Year	Album	Label	JPN
1987	All I Do	Kitty Records	2
1993	Akogare (あこがれ)	Kitty Records	4
1993	Karinto Kouba no Entotsu no Ue ni (カリント工場の煙突の上に)	Sony Music Entertainment Japan	17
1994	Love Song Blue	Sony Music Entertainment Japan	18
1996	Cafe Japan	Sony Music Entertainment Japan	4
1997	Junk Land	Sony Music Entertainment Japan	9
1998	Grand Love	Sony Music Entertainment Japan	12
1999	Winered no Kokoro (ワインレッドの心, Wainreddo no Kokoro)	BMG Funhouse	11
2000	Nisemono	BMG Funhouse	19
2001	Spade (スペード, Supēdo)	BMG Funhouse	19
2005	Kyou to Iu Kono Hi wo Ikiteikou (今日というこの日を生きていこう)	Sony Music Entertainment Japan	26
2006	Present	Sony Music Entertainment Japan	25
2007	Wakusei (惑星)	Sony Music Entertainment Japan	30
2014.3.19	Gold	Sony Music Entertainment Japan	30

==== Cover albums ====
Year	Album	Label	Chart positions
Year	Album	Label	JPN
1999	Wine Red no Kokoro	Funhouse	11
2012	Offer Music Box	Space Shower Music	31
2014.11.19	Great Stars (群像の星)	Space Shower Music	31
2020	Chocolate Cosmo	Nippon Columbia	21

==== Live albums ====
Year	Album	Label	Chart positions
Year	Album	Label	JPN
1995	T	Sony Music Entertainment Japan	49
2005	Live!!; "Kyou to Iu Kono Hi wo Ikiteikou" (LIVE!! 『今日というこの日を生きていこう』)	Sony Music Entertainment Japan	64
2006	"Hassan Da-!!"; '06 Present Tour Live ('06 PRESENT TOUR LIVE "発散だー！！")	Sony Music Entertainment Japan	60
2008	Koji Tamaki '07; "Wakusei" Tour Live (☆惑星☆TOUR LIVE)	Sony Music Entertainment Japan	154
2015.12.16	Live Concert Tour 2015 (玉置浩二LIVE旭川市公会堂)	Space Shower Music	73
2024.2.21	Tamaki Kōji Concert Tour 2022 (玉置浩二 Concert Tour 2022 故郷楽団 35th ANNIVERSARY ～星路(みち)～ in 仙台)	Space Shower Music	TBA

==== Compilation albums ====
Year	Album	Label	Chart positions
Year	Album	Label	JPN
1994	Anzen Chitai/Tamaki Kouji Best	Kitty	-
1995	Tamaki Koji Best Songs For You	Kitty	-
1997	Early Times: Koji Tamaki in Kitty Records	Kitty Enterprise	-
1998	Denen Koji Tamaki Best	Sony	19
2003	Best Harvest	BMG Japan	65
2003	Golden Best Tamaki Kōji Early Times Price	Universal Music Japan	-
2011	GOLDEN☆BEST Tamaki Kouji 1993-2007	Sony Music Direct	229
2017	All Time Best	Sony Music Direct	11
2022	The Best Album 35th Anniversary: Melody	Nippon Columbia	12

=== Singles ===
Year	Album	Chart positions (JP)	Label
1987	"All I Do"	10	Kitty Records
1989	"Ki Tsu I" (キ・ツ・イ)	7	Kitty Records
1989	"Hyouten" (氷点)	12	Kitty Records
1989	"I'm Dandy"	10	Kitty Records
1989	"Ikanaide" (行かないで)	16	Kitty Records
1993	"Call" (コール)	22	Kitty Records
1993	"Genki na Machi" (元気な町)	41	Sony
1994	"Love Song"	35	Sony
1995	"Star"	90	Sony
1996	"Melody" (メロディー)	49	Sony
1996	"Den-En" (田園)	2	Sony
1997	"Mr. Lonely"	14	Sony
1998	"Rookie"	49	Funhouse
1998	"Happy Birthday"	69	Funhouse
1999	"Nijiiro Datta" (虹色だった)	26	Funhouse
2000	"aibo"	54	Funhouse
2001	"Kono Rhyzhm de" (このリズムで)	96	Funhouse
2004	"Shiawase no Lamp" (しあわせのランプ)	83	Sony
2005	"Aisaretai Dakesa" (愛されたいだけさ)	35	Sony
2005	"Itsumo Dokoka de" (いつもどこかで)	48	Sony
2005	"Present" (今日というこの日を生きていこう)	13	Sony
2006	"Lion"	60	Sony
2007	"Wakusei" (惑星)	67	Sony
2013	"Junjou" (純情)	62	Saltmoderate
2013	"Search Light" (サーチライト)	32	Saltmoderate
2022	"Michi" (星路 (みち))	23	Nippon Columbia
2022	"Beautiful World"	26	Nippon Columbia

== Videography ==
No.	Release	Title
Kitty Records
1st	1987.11.01	"All I Do" Filmed in U.K
Sony Records
2nd	1995.11.01	Saikou Desho?!
3rd	1997.03.21	Shall I Make it For You? Cafe Japan Tour
BMG Funhouse
4th	1998.03.21	We can Believe in our "Junk Land"
5th	1999.02.24	"Grand Love" a Life in Music
6th	2001.07.25	Kono Rhythm De
Sony Records
7th	2005.11.02	"Kyou to iu Kono Hi wo Ikiteikou" Live in Zepp Tokyo
8th	2006.12.05	'06 Present Tour Live
9th	2008.03.26	Koji Tamaki'07 Wakusei Tour Live
10th	2014.04.02	Koji Tamaki Music Videos 1996-2013
11th	2015.06.10	Gold Tour 2014
12th	2021.08.18	Chocolate cosmos: Koi no Omoide, Setsunai Koigokoro
13th	2021.12.08	Billboard classics Premium Symphonic Concert 2021 The Eurasian Renaissance
14th	2023.08.02	Tamaki Kōji 35th Anniversary Concert 35th Special Collections“Arcadia”&“Michi”

== Filmography ==
Television

- The Last Bullet (1995) – Ichiro Yamamura
- Hideyoshi (1996) – Ashikaga Yoshiaki
- Konna Koi no Hanashi (1997) – Konosuke Shimodaira
- Furuhata Ninzaburō (1999) – Shūzō Utena
