= The Best Ten =

Japanese music television program

- Title screen 1978-1989
- Genre: Music
- Directed by: Shuji Yamada
- Presented by: Tetsuko Kuroyanagi; Hiroyuki Konishi; Hiroshi Kume; Kenji Matsushita; Masayuki Watanabe; Akihiro Karasawa
- Opening theme: "The Best Ten theme" by Katsuhisa Hattori
- Ending theme: Same as open
- Composers: Katsuhisa Hattori; Tadahiko Nagasu
- Country of origin: Japan
- Original language: Japanese
- No. of episodes: 603

Production
- Producer: Shuji Yamada
- Running time: 55 minutes (1978-1982); 54 minutes (1982-1989)
- Production company: TBS

Original release
- Network: JNN (TBS)
- Release: January 11, 1978 – September 28, 1989

The Best Ten (ザ・ベストテン, Za Besuto Ten) was a Japanese music chart television program broadcast on TBS Television from 1978 to 1989. The weekly shows were broadcast live on Thursdays. During its broadcast history, the air time and day changed only once. Each episode had one male and one female presenter. From 1978 to 1989, there were a total of four male presenters. The female presenter was always Tetsuko Kuroyanagi. The program is also colloquially known as Best Ten (ベストテン, Besuto Ten).

During its broadcast time since 1978, numerous other music television programs, including Fuji TV's music program Yoru no Hit Studio (夜のヒットスタジオ, Yoru no Hitto Sutajio), which was first broadcast ten years earlier in 1968, were already popular and well known all over Japan. The popularity and audience rating increased very quickly and reached 41.9%.

When Oricon Style published the results of the national survey of "Music programs that I would like to see revived" in May 2010, The Best Ten achieved first place. When news website Shunkan Josei Prime published the same survey in November 2023, The Best Ten was again in first place, regaining the same place as in the 2010 survey charts. The surveyors answered the reason behind revival for "excitement of the weekly new charts, its original ranking system, entertaining presenters and memorable outdoor performances".

The program has been re-broadcast on the cable television channel TBS Channel 2 in 2020 and 2022. The order of broadcasting was chosen based on the high view ranting and popularity. According to the article published on news website Sponichi in 2020, one of the reasons for the re-broadcast decision was for the younger generation having interest in kayōkyoku music, referring to the Japanese phenomenon "Shōwa Kayo Boom" (昭和歌謡ブーム). Partial reason was the Kayōkyoku special episode of Matsuko no Shiranai Sekai hosted by Matsuko Deluxe, which broadcast on the same year.

"The Best Ten Theme" was performed during the 62nd Japan Record Awards to commemorate and show respect for the original composer of the song, Katsuhisa Hattori, who died earlier that year.

== History ==
The Best Ten was a weekly 54 minutes (in later years 55 minutes) music program. The music chart program was successor of the previous music program TBS Kayokyoku Best Ten (TBS歌謡曲ベストテン, TBS Kayōkyoku Besuto Ten), which broadcast in years 1965-1967 and in general music program TBS Uta no Grandprix (TBS歌のグランプリ, TBS Uta no Guranpuri). Many Japanese musical acts made their television performance debut on The Best Ten, but the show has also hosted many artists from all around the world. In the span of 11 years, over 630 episodes were broadcast and more than 400 artists performed.

The show was always notable for the ranking boards clattering away before the announcement by presenter, as they went up to show The Best Ten's top 10 singles of the week. In the case if the artist could not appear, they would jump immediately to announce the next chart position. For the rankings from 11 to 20, they were given 5 seconds screen time for video-sound introduction with the chart performance for the last 4 weeks. In the case if it was the first week, only the one position would be displayed. In 2016, in magazine "Pen", the producer and the director of the program Shuji Yamada revealed, that board construction and idea comes from airport's tables of departures and arrival.

The guests always came through the shiny wall panel, to greet with presenters and have a one-two minute short interview about song or recent events before the stage performance. Every week, the staff would build sets for each artist to enhance the song's atmosphere and performance. Inspired by Yoru no Hit Studio, solo artists were accompanied by TBS' studio orchestra until 1985, when the show began to use pre-recorded backing tracks. Artists were also shown performing on location, such as an entrance of temple or inside train. Unlike Yoru no Hit Studio, which allowed artist to perform in full chorus, The Best Ten it was always one and half chorus. Sometimes before the start of artist's performance, the presenters would read a randomly chosen postcard letter during the song's intro. After the end of performance, they would sit on the large sofa. During the program's end credits, a memorial group photo was shown.

In cases where artists couldn't appear on the program due to scheduling conflicts, or otherwise refused to appear on TV, the presenters would conduct a phone interview, and in later years, long-distance camera interviews.

The series' ratings began declining in 1985. Factors included the departureof the series' first male presenter, Hiroshi Kume, along with the increasing number of featured artists who declined to appear on the program, and the use of backing tracks during live performances.

In July 1989, the cancelation of the program has been announced during the broadcast. As for the cancelation reason, Kuroyanagi expressed "difficulty to have 10 artist performance within the short amount of broadcast time and blaming the lengthened performance time from the half-chorus to full"; claiming later that one of presenters priorities "was to always give small interview with the artist".

By the end of The Best Ten, it has been replaced by music news program Ongaku Ha Together (音楽派Together), which aired on the same day and time as The Best Ten and shared same female presenter, Kuroyanagi.

== Ranking system ==
The Best Best includes its own music ranking chart, which was equally recognized to the music industry and music association.

The point system has been based on the four important factors:

- record sales (using rankings from three companies: Oricon, Music Lab, and Music Research)
- cable broadcast requests (using data from the national cable music broadcasting association)
- radio broadcast request charts (using the rankings of 25 radio stations for this program)
- postcard requests by the fans

The scoring point ratio at the start of the program were: "30 points for record", "10 points for cable", "20 points for radio" and "40 points for postcard". During the time, the postcards had the highest points. However, in February 1979, TBS announced that the scoring ratio would be changed from 20 points to 30 points for radio and from 40 to 30 points for postcards (record points and cable points remained unchanged). The reason for the change was, that "many postcards with clearly the same handwriting but different names were found, borrowed other people's names without permission.

The scoring ratio was subsequently revised, and from 1981 it became: "45 points for records", "10 points for cable", "21 points for radio" and "23 points for postcard", and from 1986 until the end, it became "60 points for records", "10 points for cable", "10 points for radio" and "20 points for postcards".

By the end of a year, special The Best Ten Top 10 Yearly Charts (各年の年間ベストテン) has been published and by the order from 10 to 1. The artists, who've charted performed on the year's final broadcast.

== Presenters ==
Throughout its history, The Best Ten was hosted by 4 male presenters and 1 female presenter. Tetsuko Kuroyanagi was the series' longest-running host. In October 2023, Hiroshi Kume published a book about his 17 years of experience and emotions during hosting the program.

Year	Main Male	Main Female
1978–1985	Hiroshi Kume (久米宏)	Tetsuko Kuroyanagi (黒柳徹子)
1985–1986	Hiroyuki Konishi (小西博之)	Tetsuko Kuroyanagi (黒柳徹子)
1986–1989	Kenji Matsushita (松下賢次)	Tetsuko Kuroyanagi (黒柳徹子)
1989	Masayuki Watanabe (渡辺正行); Akihiro Karasawa (柄沢晃弘)	Tetsuko Kuroyanagi (黒柳徹子)

== Revival Specials ==
After the series' 1989 cancelation, various specials were broadcast from 1991 to 2019, some up to 3 hours long. Certain specials featured the current hosts discussing the show's history and playing archived clips of some of its more notable performances.

- "Omoide no Best Ten" - 1 April 1991 – 8 March 1992
- "Konya Dake! Gohonka Fukkatsu The Best Ten Special" - 3 October 1991
- "The Best Ten 1991 Nenmatsu Special" - 28 December 1991
- "The Best Ten Dousoukai" - 26 December 1993
- "The Best Ten Dousoukai II" - 29 March 1994
- "The Best Ten Fukkatsu Ban" - 4 April 1995
- "The Best Ten Konya Dake no Goukaban '97" - 28 December 1997
- "The Best Ten Fukkouban Special" - 2000–2004
  - annual broadcast, which always aired on 31 December
- "Fukkatsu! The Best Ten" - 12 July 2019

== Releases ==
Beginning in 2009, numerous branded CD and DVD box sets were released due to high demand from the artists' fans.

The DVDs include full footage of the performances, however in some occasions, the interviews shown before the performances were not included.

=== Albums ===
==== Compilation albums ====
Release	Title	Label	Serial No.	Reference
22 April 2009	The Best Ten 1978-1979	GT Music	MHCL-1500	
22 April 2009	The Best Ten 1980-1991	USMTVM	UICZ-805	
22 April 2009	The Best Ten 1982-1983	Victor	VICL-63297	
22 April 2009	The Best Ten 1984-1985	Pony Canyon	PCCA-02894	
22 April 2009	The Best Ten Kayoukyoku Hen 1978-1985	Nippon Columbia	COCP-35547	
22 April 2009	The Best Ten Kayoukyoku Hen II 1978-1989	Nippon Columbia	COCP-36227	
22 April 2009	The Best Ten Spotlight Hen 1978-1985	GT Music	MHCL-1501	
23 June 2010	The Best Ten 1986-1987	Pony Canyon	PCCA-03049	
23 June 2010	The Best Ten 1988-1989	USMTVM	UICZ-8071	
23 June 2010	The Best Ten Spotlight Hen II 1978-1985	GT Music	MHCL-1619	
23 June 2010	The Best Ten Request Hen II 1978-1989	Victor	VICL-63405	

=== DVD set-boxes ===
Release	Title	Format	Label	Serial No.	Reference
16 December 2009	The Best Ten Momoe Yamaguchi	5-DVD	TBS Television	TCED-689	
16 March 2011	The Best Ten The Checkers	6-DVD	Pony Canyon	PCBE-63405	
28 March 2012	The Best Ten Akina Nakamori	5-DVD	Warner Music Japan	POBD-22043	
28 March 2024	The Best Ten Yoko Minamino	3-Blu-ray	CBS-Sony	MHXL 138~40	
19 March 2025	Miho Nakayama 40th Anniversary: The Best Ten	5-Blu-ray	King Records	KIXM611	

==== Other DVD set-boxes ====
Release	Title	Note	Label	Serial No.	Reference
4 November 2015	Candies Memories For Freedom	Disc 3 includes 2 video footages from The Best Ten	Sony Records	DQBX-1222	
23 December 2020	Naoko Eternal Songs	Disc 1 and Disc 2 are from The Best Ten	Nippon Columbia	COBA-7211	
28 April 2021	Kenji Sawada TBS Premium Collection	Disc 4 and Disc 5 are from The Best Ten	Nippon Columbia	COBA-7211	
25 March 2022	The 50 Hideki Saijo song of memories	Disc 3 and Disc 4 are from The Best Ten	Sony Records	DQBX-1241	

=== Home video DVD ===
==== Other home video DVD ====
Release	Title	Artist	Label	Note	Reference
26 October 2010	Golden Days	Minako Honda	Warner Music Japan	Disc 3 (DVD Disc 1) includes 15 video footages from The Best Ten	

== Publications ==
=== Books ===
Title	Author	Release	Publisher	ISBN
The Best Ten (ザ・ベストテン)	Shuji Yamada	29 March 2012	Shinchousha	ISBN 978-4-10-136341-7

=== Magazine feat. ===
Title	Author	Release	Publisher	ISBN
The Best Ten Ima Yomigaeru! 80's Pops Hit History (ザ・ベストテン いま蘇る！８０´ｓポップスＨＩＴヒストリー)	collective author	20 April 2004	Kadokawa	ISBN 978-4-04-8944533

== See also ==
- Yoru no Hit Studio
