= Satoshi Takebe =

Satoshi Takebe 武部 聡志
- Born: February 12, 1957 (age 69); Tokyo, Japan
- Occupations: Musician; Keyboard player; Arranger; Music director and producer
- Instrument: Keyboard
- Member of: Kokua

Satoshi Takebe (武部 聡志, Takebe Satoshi; born February 12, 1957) is a Japanese musician, keyboard player, arranger, music director and producer from Tokyo.

== Music career ==
He is the composer, keyboardist, arranger, and musical producer for artists such as Yo Hitoto, Miki Imai, Tomomi Kahara, JUJU, Yuzu, and Ken Hirai among others. He has also been a music director and supervisor for several TV programs, including FNS Music Festival and Music Fair.

In 2006 he was part of a special unit called Kokua, together with other Japanese musicians, to record the theme song for a NHK documentary program. In 2016, the members reunited to celebrate the 10th anniversary of the release of the single Progress, and recorded a new album, Progress, the 1st official album of the group.

Takebe also served as a music director for various ice shows, including the solo show Gift at Tokyo Dome, produced and performed by Japanese figure skater and two-time Olympic champion Yuzuru Hanyu in collaboration with choreographer Mikiko, in front of a record audience of 35,000 spectators. Takebe led a special band that performed alongside the Tokyo Philharmonic Orchestra and presented his self-composed music piece titled "Gift" at the end of the show.

A special tribute album to movie soundtracks from Studio Ghibli was released in 2023, produced by Takebe in collaboration with 12 renowned Japanese artists, including Dean Fujioka, Leo Ieiri, Lilas Ikuta, Kaela Kimura, Hikari Mitsushima, Wakana, Kohei Matsushita, Hayato Sumino, Ryuta Shibuya from Super Beaver, Shiori Tamai from Momoiro Clover Z, and the bands Gre4n Boyz and Little Glee Monster.

== Books ==
- "Yūmin no utagoe wa naze kokoro o yusaburu no ka kataritsugitai saikō no utaitetachi" (ISBN 9784087213409, release 15 November 2024)
