= Yuki Saito (actress) =

Japanese actress, singer and narrator (born 1966)

Yuki Saitō
- 斉藤 由貴
- Born: Yuki Saitō; September 10, 1966 (age 60); Yokohama, Kanagawa, Japan
- Occupations: Actress; singer; narrator
- Years active: 1984–present
- Employer: Toho Entertainment
- Spouse: Nobuyasu Isarai (m. 1994; div. 2024)
- Children: 3, including Rin Mizushima
- Relatives: Ryūji Saitō (brother); Yū Serizawa (niece)

Yuki Saito (Japanese: 斉藤 由貴, romanized: Saitō Yuki; born September 10, 1966, in Minami-ku, Yokohama, Kanagawa Prefecture) is a Japanese actress, singer and narrator. She attended Kanagawa Prefectural Shimizugaoka High School (now Yokohama Seiryo Sogo High School).

She is well known in Japan for being a member of LDS Church, as she refuses to work on Sundays. Saito used a fake cigarette while filming the 1986 film Koisuru Onnatachi due to her beliefs.

In 1985, after making her singing debut with her single Sotsugyō and her debut album, Axia, she was cast in the lead role of Saki Asamiya in the first Sukeban Deka television drama series. She later revisited that story by playing Saki's mother in the 2006 movie, Yo-Yo Girl Cop. She has starred in and been cast in many television and film dramas and comedies, and has also done voice-over narration work.

Saito has released 21 singles and 13 original albums. She has also released a live album, eight "best of" compilation albums, and has been featured on five tribute albums where she covered songs by The Carpenters, songs from Walt Disney films, and others.

Her father owns an obi shop in Yokohama, and her brother is the actor Ryūji Saitō.

== Career ==
While attending high school in 1984, Saito won the third annual "Miss Magazine" Grand Prix contest run by Kodansha in Weekly Shōnen Magazine. She made her singing debut in 1985 with her single release Sotsugyō and her debut album, Axia. That same year, Saito took the leading role in Sukeban Deka, a TV series following the exploits of Saki Asamiya, a high school delinquent who is pressed into service as a yo-yo-wielding undercover police officer sent to a high school known for its vicious gangs.

Saito was selected to play the heroine in the NHK morning TV novel series Hanekonma in 1986. This series garnered a rating of 41.7% for its timeslot. At the end of the year, she was the captain of the Red Team on Kōhaku Uta Gassen, where she debuted her song, Kanashimi yo Konnichi wa, the first opening theme for the anime television series Maison Ikkoku. This song became one of the most popular anime theme songs of all time.

She was captain of the red team again in 1989, where her single In A Dream (夢の中へ, Yume no Naka e) was ranked fifth in the competition. She would later, in 2007, perform both the opening and ending theme songs for another anime series, Les Misérables: Shōjo Cosette, an adaptation of Victor Hugo's classic novel by Nippon Animation for their World Masterpiece Theater series. Saitō had earlier played the title character, Cosette, in its 1987 musical stage version.

She wrote a commentary on Yasutaka Tsutsui's work Kyakusō Gijitsu in 1989. Saito married salaryman Nobuyasu Isarai in 1994, and they have one son and two daughters, including Rin Mizushima. The couple divorced in December 2024. While she still occasionally takes acting roles, she spends most of her time with her family. During the 1990s, Saito began moving from the role of idol star to doing more acting in movies, television, and on stage. She also began writing poetry, doing voice-over narration, and song and lyric writing.

Saito has a wide range of roles, from serious to comedic. Throughout the 1990s, most of her roles on stage, TV, and film were serious, dramatic roles. In 2006, she returned to her comedy roots with a role in Wagahai wa Shufu Dearu. Along with Mitsuhiro Oikawa, she formed a duo called "Yanake" (やな家) in 2006 and released Kateinai Date (家庭内デート), and made her first singing appearance in seven years on June 8, 2006. This year also marked the 17th year since her appearance on the Takaaki Ishibashi owarai show The Tunnels' Thanks to Everyone. In the 2006 movie, Yo-Yo Girl Cop, Saito plays Saki's mother. She held several 25th anniversary concerts in February 2011.

== Personal life ==
Saito is well known in Japan for being a member of the Church of Jesus Christ of Latter-day Saints, as she refuses to work on Sundays. In the 1986 film Koisuru Onnatachi, Saito used a fake cigarette used for asthma patients due to her LDS beliefs, which forbid the use of tobacco, including smoking.

Saito's father owns a long-standing and respected obi tailoring shop in Yokohama, and sells his obis to multiple kimono stores in Motomachi, Tobe, and other places within the city. Her brother is the actor Ryūji Saitō. Saito's hobbies include poetry, illustrating, and writing books.

== Filmography ==
=== TV dramas ===
Title	Year	Role	Notes	Ref.
Yakyū-kyō no Uta	1985	Yūki Mizuhara	Lead role: television film	
Sukeban Deka	1985	Saki Asamiya	Lead role	
Pappa kara no Okurimono	1985		Lead role	
Hane Konma	1986	Orin	Lead role; Asadora	
Amae Naide yo!	1987		Lead role	
Totte Oki no Seishun	1988		Lead role	
Asobi ni Oide yo!	1988		Lead role	
High School Rakugaki	1989	Izumi Suwa	Lead role	
Shōnan Monogatari	1989		Lead role	
Lucky Tenshi, Miyako e Iku	1989	Mari Yamauchi	Lead role	
High School Rakugaki 2	1990	Izumi Suwa	Lead role	
Tales of the Unusual: Autumn 1990: "Zettai Iya!"	1990		Lead role; short drama	
Kazunomiya-sama O-Tome	1991	Fuki	Lead role: television film	
Onna Jiken Kisha Tachibana Keiko	1992	Keiko Tachibana	Lead role	
Mattanashi!	1992		Lead role	
Dōsōkai	1993		Lead role	
Fukui-sanchi no Isan Sōzoku	1994		Lead role	
Tales of the Unusual: Autumn 1994: "Derarenai"	1994		Lead role; short drama	
Hachidai Shōgun Yoshimune	1995	Princess Tsuru	Taiga drama	
Kimi wo Omou yori Kimi ni Aitai	1995			
Bōryoku Kyōshi: Kimi ni Tsutaetai Koto	1996			
Eien no Atom: Tezuka Osamu Monogatari	1999	Yumiko Igarashi		
Wakaretara Suki na Hito	1999		Lead role	
Aru Hi, Arashi no yō ni	2001			
Kindaichi Kōsuke Series "Jinmensō"	2003			
Onna no Ichidaiki: Jakucho Setouchi	2005	Tsuya Setouchi		
Wagahai wa Shufu Dearu	2006	Midori Yana	Lead role	
O Banzai!	2007	Kurumi Hanazono	Lead role	
Utahime	2007	Seiko Matsujima		
Battery	2008	Makiko Harada		
Shōkōjo Seira	2009	Emiko Mimura		
The Ancient Dogoo Girl	2009	Sayuri Sugihara		
Dōsōkai: Love Again Shōkōgun	2010	Yōko Nishikawa	Lead role	
Sotsugyō Homerun	2011	Sayuri Inoue	Television film	
Saigo no Bansan: Keiji Tōno Kazuyuki to Shichinin no Yōgisha	2011	Natsumi Tōno	Television film	
Hi ha Mata Noboru	2011	Natsumi Tōno		
Ohisama	2011	Fusako Haraguchi	Asadora	
Lessons	2011	Kanako Kurosawa	Television film	
Keisatsui Akizuki Kei no Kenshi File	2012	Kei Akizuki	Lead role	
Koi Aji Oyako	2012	Sawako Nishiyama		
Ashita o Akiramenai	2012	Yuriko Nakajima		
Naniwa Shōnen Tanteidan	2012	Hideko Harada		
Iryū Sōsa	2012	Kyōko Mizusawa		
Gomen ne Seishun!	2014	Yoshie Yoshii		
Sanada Maru	2016	Acha no Tsubone	Taiga drama	
Keishichō Sōsaikkachō	2016–22	Hirai Makoto	6 seasons	
Mom, May I Quit Being Your Daughter?	2017	Hayase Akiko		
Kuroido Goroshi	2018	Kana Shiba		
Miss Sherlock	2018	Mariko Irikawa		
Scandal Senmon Bengoshi QUEEN''	2019	Mano Seiko		
Schöner, Ruhiger Garten	2019	Midori Asagiri		
The Yagyu Conspiracy	2020	Oeyo		
The Dangerous Venus	2020	Yagami Sadako		
The Words They Speak	2021	Iwato Shima		
Youtuber ni Musume wa Yaran	2022	Mieko Taira		
Koi Nante, Honki de Yatte Dousuruno?	2022	Nagamine Mayumi		
Ōoku: The Inner Chambers	2023	Lady Kasuga		
Fixer	2023	Kyōko Watanab		
Giver Taker	2023	Marie Kishi		
Dr. Chocolate	2023	Unagi		
Beyond Goodbye	2024	Yuriko Nakamachi		
I Wanna Punch That Scumbag!	2024	Akemi Sato		
The Laughing Salesman	2025		Episode 2	
Lost 10	2026	Harune		

=== Films ===
Title	Year	Role	Notes	Ref.
Yuki no Danshō: Jōnetsu	1986	Iori Natsuki	Lead role	
Koisuru Onnatachi	1987	Takako Yoshioka	Lead role	
Rakko Monogatari	1987	Emi (voice)	Lead role	
Totto Channel	1987	Tetsuko Shibuyanagi	Lead role	
"Sayonara" no Onnatachi	1988	Ikuko Adachi	Lead role	
Yūshun Oracion	1988	Kumiko Wagu	Lead role	
Kimi wa Boku o Suki ni Naru	1989	Tomako	Lead role	
Godzilla vs. Biollante	1989	Evacuation Announcement voice	Uncredited	
Hong Kong Paradise	1990	Mamiko Yukawa	Lead role	
Oishii Kekkon	1991		Lead role	
Watashi no Kokoro wa Papa no Mono	1992		Lead role	
Night Train To The Stars	1996			
June Bride: 6/19 no Hanayome	1998			
Wait and See	1999			
Zeitaku na Fune	2001			
Inochi	2002			
Aoi Uta	2006			
Yo-Yo Girl Cop	2006	Saki's Mother		
Kids	2008			
Baby! Baby! Baby!	2009			
Ballad: Na mo Naki Koi no Uta	2009			
Bandage	2010			
Graffreeter Toki	2012	Shizue	Lead role	
The Third Murder	2017			
Hyouka: Forbidden Secrets	2017			
Inuyashiki	2018			
Fortuna's Eye	2019			
Aircraft Carrier Ibuki	2019			
Hit Me Anyone One More Time	2019			
The First Supper	2019			
Listen to the Universe	2019			
Extro	2020	Herself		
One Summer Story	2021	Yuki		
Matched	2024	Setsuko		
The Floor Plan	2024			
Adabana	2024			
Blank Canvas: My So-Called Artist's Journey	2025		Special appearance	
Scarlet	2025	Gertrude (voice)		
4 Outs: Back to the Ballgame	2026	Koru Abukuma		

=== Dubbing ===
Title	Year	Role	Notes	Ref.
Paddington	2014	Mary Brown		

== Theatre ==
- Les Misérables (1987) (Cosette)
- Kara Sawagi (1990)
- 5-ji no Koibito (1992)
- Nijūyon no Hitomi (1994)
- Kimi to Naru: Nobody Else But You (1995)
- Ningen Kazaguruma (2000)
- Sora no Kaa-sama (2001)
- Friends (2001)
- Nikui Anchi Kushō (2002) (Kosode)
- Claudia kara no Tegami (2006)
- Zebra (2009)
- Saitō Sachiko (2009)
- Kiseki no Melody: Watanabe Hamako Monogatari (2010)
- Our Town (2011)
