= Miyuki Nakajima discography =

This is the list of music recordings produced by the Japanese singer-songwriter Miyuki Nakajima. She has released 44 studio albums, 47 singles, 3 live albums, 11 live videos, and multiple compilations up to July 2023.

Chart positions listed here are provided by the Oricon Weekly Singles and Albums Charts, started in 1968 and 1970, respectively. The Japanese albums chart had been separated into LPs (started in 1970), cassette tapes (introduced in 1974), and compact discs (launched in 1985) charts until they were unified in January 1987. For the albums released before 1987, the position on the LP chart are prioritized in principle, except for the materials not issued on vinyl.

== Studio albums ==
Year	Title	Chart positions
Year	Title	JPN
1976	Watashi no Koe ga Kikoemasuka (私の声が聞こえますか): 1st studio album; Released: April 25, 1976; Label: Canyon/AARD-VARK (Currently distributed by Yamaha Music Communications)	10
1976	Minna Itte Shimatta (みんな去ってしまった): 2nd studio album; Released: October 25, 1976; Label: Canyon/AARD-VARK (Currently distributed by Yamaha Music Communications)	23
1977	A Ri Ga To U (あ・り・が・と・う): 3rd studio album; Released: June 25, 1977; Producer: Genichi Kawakami; Label: Canyon/AARD-VARK (Currently distributed by Yamaha Music Communications)	6
1978	Aishiteiru to Ittekure (愛していると云ってくれ): 4th studio album; Released: April 10, 1978; Producer: Genichi Kawakami; Label: Canyon/AARD-VARK (Currently distributed by Yamaha Music Communications)	2
1979	Shin-ai Naru Mono e (親愛なる者へ): 5th studio album; Released: March 21, 1979; Producer: Miyuki Nakajima; Label: Canyon/AARD-VARK (Currently distributed by Yamaha Music Communications)	1
1979	Okaerinasai (おかえりなさい): 6th studio album; Released: November 21, 1979; Producer: Miyuki Nakajima; Label: Canyon/AARD-VARK (Currently distributed by Yamaha Music Communications)	2
1980	Ikiteitemo Iidesuka (生きていてもいいですか): 7th studio album; Released: April 5, 1980; Producer: Miyuki Nakajima; Label: Canyon/AARD-VARK (Currently distributed by Yamaha Music Communications)	1
1981	Month of Parturition (臨月, Ringetsu): 8th studio album; Released: March 5, 1981; Producer: Miyuki Nakajima; Label: Canyon/AARD-VARK (Currently distributed by Yamaha Music Communications)	1
1982	Kansuigyo (寒水魚): 9th studio album; Released: March 21, 1982; Producer: Miyuki Nakajima; Label: Canyon/AARD-VARK (Currently distributed by Yamaha Music Communications)	1
1983	Hunch (予感, Yokan): 10th studio album; Released: March 5, 1983; Producer: Miyuki Nakajima; Label: Canyon/AARD-VARK (Currently distributed by Yamaha Music Communications)	1
1984	How Do You Do (はじめまして, Hajimemashite): 11th studio album; Released: October 24, 1984; Producer: Miyuki Nakajima; Label: Canyon/AARD-VARK (Currently distributed by Yamaha Music Communications)	1
1985	Change (御色なおし, Oiro Naoshi): 12th studio album; Released: April 17, 1985; Producer: Airando	1
1985	miss M.: 13th studio album; Released: November 7, 1985; Producer: Airando; Label: Canyon/AARD-VARK (Currently distributed by Yamaha Music Communications)	1
1986	36.5°C: 14th studio album; Released: November 12, 1986; Producer: Yoshihiro Kai and miss M.; Label: Canyon/AARD-VARK (Currently distributed by Yamaha Music Communications)	2
1988	Miyuki Nakajima (中島みゆき, Nakajima Miyuki): 15th studio album; Released: March 16, 1988; Producer: Kazuo Shiina and miss M.; Label: Pony Canyon/AARD-VARK (Currently distributed by Yamaha Music Communications)	3
1988	Goodbye Girl (グッバイ ガール, Gubbai Gāru): 16th studio album; Released: November 16, 1988; Producer: Ichizo Seo and Miyuki Nakajima; Label: Pony Canyon/AARD-VARK (Currently distributed by Yamaha Music Communications)	1
1989	Kaikinetsu (回帰熱): 17th studio album; Released: November 15, 1989; Producer: Ichizo Seo and Miyuki Nakajima; Label: Pony Canyon/AARD-VARK (Currently distributed by Yamaha Music Communications)	2
1990	Yoru wo Yuke (夜を往け): 18th studio album; Released: June 13, 1990; Producer: Ichizo Seo and Miyuki Nakajima; Label: Pony Canyon/AARD-VARK (Currently distributed by Yamaha Music Communications)	3
1991	Utadeshika Ienai (歌でしか言えない): 19th studio album; Released: October 23, 1991; Producer: Ichizo Seo and Miyuki Nakajima; Label: Pony Canyon/AARD-VARK (Currently distributed by Yamaha Music Communications)	4
1992	East Asia: 20th studio album; Released: October 7, 1992; Producer: Ichizo Seo and Miyuki Nakajima; Label: Pony Canyon/AARD-VARK (Currently distributed by Yamaha Music Communications)	2
1993	Jidai: Time Goes Around (時代～Time goes around): 21st studio album; Released: October 21, 1993; Producer: Ichizo Seo and Miyuki Nakajima; Label: Pony Canyon/AARD-VARK (Currently distributed by Yamaha Music Communications)	4
1994	Love or Nothing: 22nd studio album; Released: October 21, 1994; Producer: Ichizo Seo and Miyuki Nakajima; Label: Pony Canyon/AARD-VARK (Currently distributed by Yamaha Music Communications)	1
1995	10 Wings: 23rd studio album; Released: October 20, 1995; Producer: Ichizo Seo and Miyuki Nakajima; Label: Pony Canyon/AARD-VARK (Currently distributed by Yamaha Music Communications)	8
1996	Paradise Cafe (パラダイス・カフェ, Paradaisu Kafe): 24th studio album; Released: October 18, 1996; Producer: Ichizo Seo and Miyuki Nakajima; Label: Pony Canyon/AARD-VARK (Currently distributed by Yamaha Music Communications)	7
1998	Be Like My Child (わたしの子供になりなさい, Watashi no Kodomo ni Narinasai): 25th studio album; Released: March 18, 1998; Producer: Ichizo Seo and Miyuki Nakajima; Label: Pony Canyon/AARD-VARK (Currently distributed by Yamaha Music Communications)	11
1999	Sun: Wings (日-WINGS, Hi -Uingusu-): 26th studio album; Released: November 3, 1999; Producer: Ichizo Seo and Miyuki Nakajima; Label: Pony Canyon/AARD-VARK(Currently distributed by Yamaha Music Communications)	18
1999	Moon: Wings (月-WINGS, Tsuki -Uingusu-): 27th studio album; Released: November 3, 1999; Producer: Ichizo Seo and Miyuki Nakajima; Label: Pony Canyon/AARD-VARK (Currently distributed by Yamaha Music Communications)	19
2000	Short Stories (短編集, Tanpenshū): 28th studio album; Released: November 15, 2000; Producer: Ichizo Seo and Miyuki Nakajima; Label: Yamaha Music Communications	7
2001	Lullaby for the Soul (心守歌, Kokoromoriuta): 29th studio album; Released: October 18, 2001; Producer: Ichizo Seo and Miyuki Nakajima; Label: Yamaha Music Communications	3
2002	Otogibanashi: Fairy Ring (おとぎばなし -Fairy Ring-, Otogibanashi -Fearī Ringu): 30th studio album; Released: October 23, 2002; Producer: Ichizo Seo and Miyuki Nakajima; Label: Yamaha Music Communications	5
2003	Love Letter (恋文, Koibumi): 31st studio album; Released: November 19, 2003; Producer: Ichizo Seo and Miyuki Nakajima; Label: Yamaha Music Communications	10
2004	Ima no Kimochi (いまのきもち): 32nd studio album; Released: November 17, 2004; Producer: Ichizo Seo and Miyuki Nakajima; Label: Yamaha Music Communications	8
2005	Ten-Sei (転生, Tensei): 33rd studio album; Released: November 16, 2005; Producer: Ichizo Seo and Miyuki Nakajima; Label: Yamaha Music Communications	12
2006	Lullaby Singer (ララバイSINGER, Rarabai Shingā): 34th studio album; Released: November 22, 2006; Producer: Ichizo Seo and Miyuki Nakajima; Label: Yamaha Music Communications	10
2007	I Love You, Do You Hear Me? (I Love You, 答えてくれ, Ai Ravu Yū, Kotaetekure): 35th studio album; Released: October 3, 2007; Producer: Ichizo Seo and Miyuki Nakajima; Label: Yamaha Music Communications	4
2009	Drama!: 36th studio album; Released: November 18, 2009; Producer: Ichizo Seo and Miyuki Nakajima; Label: Yamaha Music Communications	5
2010	Midnight Zoo (真夜中の動物園, Mayonaka no Dōbutsuen): 37th studio album; Released: October 13, 2010; Producer: Ichizo Seo and Miyuki Nakajima; Label: Yamaha Music Communications	5
2011	From the Icy Reaches (荒野より, Kōya Yori): 38th studio album; Released: November 16, 2011; Producer: Ichizo Seo and Miyuki Nakajima; Label: Yamaha Music Communications	4
2012	Night-light (常夜灯, Jōyatō): 39th studio album; Released: October 24, 2012; Producer: Ichizo Seo and Miyuki Nakajima; Label: Yamaha Music Communications	4
2014	Hard Problems (問題集, Mondaishū): 40th studio album; Released: November 12, 2014; Producer: Ichizo Seo and Miyuki Nakajima; Label: Yamaha Music Communications	4
2015	Musical Suite (組曲 (Suite), Kumikyoku (Suīto)): 41st studio album; Released: November 11, 2015; Producer: Ichizo Seo and Miyuki Nakajima; Label: Yamaha Music Communications	6
2017	アルバム『相聞』: 42nd studio album; Released: November 22, 2017; Label: Yamaha Music Communications	4
2020	Contralto: 43rd studio album; Released: January 8, 2020; Label: Yamaha Music Communications	3
2023	The Day the World Looks Different (世界が違って見える日, Sekai ga Chigatte Mieru Hi): 44th studio album; Relested: March 1, 2023; Label: Yamaha Music Communications	3

== Live and other albums ==
Year	Title	Chart positions
Year	Title	JPN
1987	Utagoyomi (歌暦): 1st live album; Released: February 21, 1987; Producer: Kazuo Shiina and miss M.; Label: Canyon/AARD-VARK (Currently distributed by Yamaha Music Communications)	1
2005	Nakajima Miyuki Live! (中島みゆきライヴ!) (subtitled Live at Sony Pictures Studios in L.A.): The album comprising studio live recordings; Released: March 23, 2005; Producer: Ichizo Seo and Miyuki Nakajima; Label: Yamaha Music Communications	54
2008	Utatabi (歌旅 中島みゆきコンサートツアー2007) (subtitled Miyuki Nakajima Concert Tour 2007): 2nd live album; Released: June 11, 2008; Producer: Ichizo Seo and Miyuki Nakajima; Label: Yamaha Music Communications	12

== Compilation albums ==
- 中島みゆき THE BEST (Nakajima Miyuki the Best) (1986, Single collection)
- Singles (1987, Complete singles compilation)
- 中島みゆき PRESENTS BEST SELECTION 16 (1989)
- Best Selection 2 (1992)
- Singles 2 (1994, Complete singles compilation)
- 大吟醸 (Daiginjō) (1996)
- 大銀幕 (Daiginmaku: Starring) (1998)
- Singles 2000 (2002, Complete singles compilation)
- 元気ですか (Genki desuka) (2006)
- 十二単〜Singles 4〜 (Jūnihitoe: Singles 4) (2013)
- "縁会 2012～3 -LIVE SELECTION-" 2014

== Singles ==
Year	Single	Chart positions	Label
Year	Single	JPN	Label
1975	"Azami Jō no Lullaby (アザミ嬢のララバイ)" / "Sayonara Sayonara (さよなら さよなら)"	38	Canyon
1975	"Time Goes Around (時代, Jidai)" / "Wings of Love (I Knew Nothing) (傷ついた翼, Kizutsuita Tsubasa)"	14	Canyon
1976	"Konbanwa (こんばんわ)" / "Tsuyoi Kaze wa Itsumo (強い風はいつも)"	—	Canyon
1976	"Yokaze no Naka kara (夜風の中から)" / "Wasurerareru Mono Naraba (忘れられるものならば)	—	Canyon
1977	"The Parting Song (わかれうた, Wakareuta)" / "On the Platform (ホームにて, Hōmu nite)"	1	Canyon
1978	"Omoidegawa (おもいで河)" / "Housenka (ほうせんか)"	19	Canyon
1979	"Revival (りばいばる, Ribaibaru)" / "Pierrot (ピエロ, Piero)"	11	Canyon
1980	"Kanashimi Warai (かなしみ笑い)" / "Kiri ni Hashiru (霧に走る)"	11	Canyon
1980	"Hitori Jouzu (ひとり上手)" / "Kanashimi ni (悲しみに)"	6	Canyon
1981	"Ashita Tenki ni Nare (あした天気になれ)" / "Anzu Mura kara (杏村から)"	25	Canyon
1981	"Akujo (悪女)" / "Warawaseru Ja Naika (笑わせるじゃないか)"	1	Canyon
1982	"Yūwaku (誘惑)" / "Yasashii On'na (やさしい女)"	2	Canyon
1982	"Unrequited Love (横恋慕, Yokorenbo)" / "Wasurenagusa wo Mou Ichido (忘れな草をもう一度)"	2	Canyon
1983	"Ano Ko (あの娘)" / "Nami no Ue (波の上)"	5	Canyon
1984	"Hitori (ひとり)" / "The Sea and the Jewels (海と宝石, Umi to Houseki)"	5	Canyon
1985	"Lonely Face (孤独の肖像, Kodoku no Shouzou)" / "100-nin Me no Koibito (100人目の恋人)"	6	Canyon
1985	"Cold Farewell (つめたい別れ, Tsumetai Wakare)" / "Showtime (ショウ・タイム, Shou Taimu)"	7	Canyon
1986	"Atai no Natsuyasumi (あたいの夏休み)" / "Uwasa (噂)"	14	Canyon
1986	"Mikaeri Bijin (見返り美人)" / "Wherever I am (どこにいても, Doko ni Itemo)"	16	Canyon
1986	"Yamaneko (やまねこ)" / "Seaside Corporouse (シーサイド・コーポラス, Shīsaido Kōporasu)"	43	Canyon
1987	"Gokigen Ikaga (御機嫌如何)" / "Sugar (シュガー)"	14	Canyon
1988	"Kamen (仮面)" / "Netsubyou (熱病)" [2nd Ver.]	23	Pony Canyon
1988	"Namida (涙)" / "Kūkō Nisshi (空港日誌)"	18	Pony Canyon
1989	"Ashita (あした)" / "Goodbye Girl (グッバイガール, Gubbai Gāru)"	18	Pony Canyon
1990	"with" / "Waratteyo Angel (笑ってよエンジェル, Waratteyo Enjeru)"	29	Pony Canyon
1991	"Tokyo Maigo (トーキョー迷子)" / "Mikaeri Bijin (見返り美人)" [2nd Ver.]	25	Pony Canyon
1992	"Birth (誕生, Tanjou)" / "Maybe"	13	Pony Canyon
1992	"Shallow Sleep (浅い眠り, Asai Nemuri)" / "Shin'ai Naru Mono e (親愛なる者へ)" [New Recording]	2	Pony Canyon
1993	"Jealousy Jealousy (ジェラシー・ジェラシー, Jerashī Jerashī)" / "Kizashi no Season (兆しのシーズン, Kizashi no Shīzun)"	22	Pony Canyon
1993	"Time Goes Around (時代, Jidai)" [New Recording] / "Saigo no Megami (最後の女神)"	22	Pony Canyon
1994	"Between the Sky and You (空と君のあいだに, Sora to Kimi no Aida ni)" / "Fight!"	1	Pony Canyon
1995	"Wanderer's Song (旅人のうた, Tabibito no Uta)" / "P-A-I-N-F-U-L (Se-Tsu-Na-Ku-Te)"	1	Pony Canyon
1996	"It's Only Love (たかが愛, Takaga Ai)" / "The First Thing I See (目を開けて最初に君を見たい, Me wo Akete Saisho ni Kimi wo Mitai)"	32	Pony Canyon
1997	"An Affectionate Tale (愛情物語, Aijou Monogatari)" / "Happiness (幸せ, Shiawase)"	28	Pony Canyon
1998	"Another Name for Life (命の別名, Inochi no Betsumei)" / "Tapestry (糸, Ito)"	12	Pony Canyon
1998	"Not Even Blinking (瞬きもせず, Mabataki mo Sezu)" / "In the Spring (私たちは春の中で, Watashitachi wa Haru no Naka de)"	22	Pony Canyon
2000	"Earthly Stars (Unsung Heroes) (地上の星, Chijou no Hoshi)" / "Headlight, Taillight (ヘッドライト・テールライト, Heddoraito Tēruraito)"	1	
2003	"Ride on the Gentle Luminous Dragon (銀の龍の背に乗って, Gin no Ryū no Se ni Notte)" / "Love Letter (恋文, Koibumi)"	4	
2005	"For Those Who Can't Go Home (帰れない者たちへ, Kaerenai Monotachi e)" / "Relay of the Soul (命のリレー, Inochi no Rirē)" [from Yakai '04]	35	
2007	"Once in a Lifetime (一期一会, Ichigo Ichie)" / "Here Comes the Ancient Rain (昔から雨が降ってくる, Mukashi kara Ame ga Futtekuru)"	11	
2009	"Ai Dake wo Nokose (愛だけを残せ)" / "Touryanse (通りゃんせ)"	15	
2012	"Onshirazu (恩知らず)" / "Jidai - raivu (時代 -ライヴ)"	12	
2014	"Mugi no Uta (麦の唄, Wheat Song)" / "Naitemo iinda yo (泣いてもいいんだよ, It's Okay To Cry (Pour Your Heart To Me)"	5	
2019	"Rikyō no Uta" (離郷の歌) / "Shinka-ju" (進化樹)	13	
2022	"Tomo ni (俱に)" / "Ride on the Gentle Luminous Dragon (銀の龍の背に乗って, Gin no Ryū no Se ni Notte)"	8	
2023	"Shin on (心音)" / "Ubyū no mono domo (有謬の者共)"		
2025	"Ichiju (一樹)"		

== Japanese Wiki ==
- 『中島みゆき(Miyuki Nakajima)』
