= Ima no Kimochi =

Studio album by Miyuki Nakajima
- Released: November 17, 2004
- Recorded: Cello Studios, O'Henry Sound Studios, and Epicurus
- Genre: Folk rock, kayōkyoku
- Length: 66:57
- Label: Yamaha Music Communications
- Producer: Ichizo Seo, Miyuki Nakajima

Miyuki Nakajima chronology
Love Letter (2003)	Ima no Kimochi (2004)	Ten-Sei (2005)

Ima no Kimochi (いまのきもち) is the 32nd studio album by Japanese singer-songwriter Miyuki Nakajima, released in November 2004. The album contains remake versions of her compositions which came out before she created the records with Ichizo Seo, who has co-produced all of her recordings since Goodbye Girl and its lead single "Namida" in 1988.

== Track listing ==
All songs written and composed by Miyuki Nakajima, arranged by Ichizo Seo

1. "Hill of Pain (あぶな坂, Abuna Zaka)" (Original version appeared on 1975 album Watashi no Koe ga Kikoemasuka
2. "The Parting Song (わかれうた, Wakareuta)" (Original version released as a single in 1977, and also featured on 1978 album Aishiteiru to Ittekure)
3. "Reiko (怜子)" (Original version appeared on 1978 album Aishiteiru to Ittekure)
4. "What is Hard to Believe (信じ難いもの, Shinjigatai Mono)" (Original version appeared on 1979 album Shin-ai Naru Mono e)
5. "If I Could Take to the Sky (この空を飛べたら, Kono Sora wo Tobetara)" (Initially recorded by Tokiko Kato, Nakajima's version appeared on 1979 album Okaerinasai)
6. "Self Portrait in Two Mirrors (あわせ鏡, Awase Kagami)" (Original version appeared on 1981 album Month of Parturition (Ringetsu))
7. "Diva (歌姫, Utahime)" (Original version appeared on 1982 album Kansuigyo)
8. "The Incline (傾斜, Keisha)" (Original version appeared on 1982 album Kansuigyo)
9. "Unrequited Love (横恋慕, Yokorenbo)" (Original version released as a single in 1982)
10. "Only Two of Us (この世に二人だけ, Kono Yo ni Futari dake)" (Original version appeared on 1983 album Hunch (Yokan))
11. "Nice to Meet You (はじめまして, Hajimemashite)" (Original version appeared on 1984 album How Do You Do(Hajimemashite))
12. "Wherever I am (どこにいても, Doko ni Itemo)" (Original version appeared on flip side of a 1986 single "Mikaeri Bijin")
13. "High Summer Waves (土用波, Doyounami)" (Original version appeared on 1988 album Nakajima Miyuki)

== Personnel ==
- Miyuki Nakajima – Lead and harmony vocals
- Vinnie Colaiuta – Drums
- Neil Stubenhaus – Electric bass
- Michael Thompson – Electric guitar, acoustic guitar
- Masayoshi Furukawa – Electric guitar
- Jon Gilutin – Acoustic piano, electric piano, hammond organ, keyboards, hammond organ
- Ichizo Seo – Keyboards
- Elton Nagata – Keyboards
- Keishi Urata – Synth programming, drum loop, percussion programming
- Tomō Satō – Synth programming, acoustic guitar, drum loop, percussion programming
- Suzie Katayama – Strings conductor
- Sid Page – Violin (Concertmaster)
- Joel Derouin – Violin (Concertmaster)
- Eve Butler – Violin
- Darius Campo – Violin
- Susan Chatman – Violin
- Mario De Leon – Violin
- Bruce Dukov – Violin
- Alyssa Park – Violin
- Armen Garabedian – Violin
- Benj Garabedian – Violin
- Cameron Patrlck – Violin
- Michele Richards – Violin
- Charlie Bisharat – Violin
- Peter Kent – Violin
- Ruth Bruegger-Johnson – Violin
- Bob Peterson – Violin
- Josefina Vergara – Violin
- Mark Robertson – Violin
- Miwako Watanabe – Violin
- John Wittenberg – Violin
- Larry Corbett – Cello
- Dan Smith – Cello
- Stefanie Fife – Cello
- Steve Richards – Cello
- Rudy Stein – Cello
- Bob Becker – Viola
- Darrin McCann – Viola
- Fumikazu Miyashita- Vocals
- Kazuyo Sugimoto – Harmony vocals
- Julia Waters – Backing vocals
- Maxine Waters – Backing vocals
- Oren Waters – Backing vocals
- Carmen Twillie – Backing vocals
- Maxi Anderson – Backing vocals

== Chart positions ==
Year	Album	Chart	Position	Weeks	Sales
2004	Ima no Kimochi	Japanese Oricon Weekly Albums Chart (Top 300)	8	12	76,000+

== Release history ==
Country	Date	Label	Format	Catalog number
Japan	November 17, 2004	Yamaha Music Communications	CD	YCCW-10010
Japan	December 3, 2008	Yamaha Music Communications	CD	YCCW-10084
