= Daiginjō =

Greatest hits album by Miyuki Nakajima
- Released: March 21, 1996
- Recorded: 1977–1995
- Genre: J-pop (Folk rock, kayōkyoku, pop)
- Length: 73:50
- Label: Pony Canyon/AARD-VARK

Miyuki Nakajima chronology
10 Wings (1995)	Daiginjō (1996)	Paradise Cafe (1996)

Daiginjō (大吟醸), subtitled Mikyuki Nakajima Best Album – The collection of most famous and finest songs, is a compilation album by Japanese singer-songwriter Miyuki Nakajima, released on March 21, 1996. The album features her most commercially successful singles "Between the Sky and You (Sora to Kimi no Aida ni)", "Shallow Sleep (Asai Nemuri)", "Wanderer's Song (Tabibito no Uta)", and "Bad Girl (Akujo)", and mainly consists of her singles that came out during the 1990s. It also includes well-recognized songs like "Rouge" (became famous by cover version Faye Wong recorded), although her earlier massive hit singles such as "Yūwaku" and "Unrequited Love (Yokorenbo)" were disregarded.

Daiginjō debuted at the number-one on the Japanese Oricon Weekly albums chart with sales of 210,000 copies, outselling The Beatles' Anthology 2 released in the same week.

== Track listing ==
All tracks written by Miyuki Nakajima, except where noted.
No.	Title	Version	Length
1.	"Sora to Kimi no Aida ni" (空と君のあいだに; "Between the Sky and You")	Single version	5:31
2.	"Akujo" (悪女; "Bad Girl")	Single version	4:02
3.	"Ashita" (あした; "Tomorrow")	Single mix	5:30
4.	"Saigo no Megami" (最後の女神; "Final Goddess")		4:51
5.	"Asai Nemuri" (浅い眠り; "Shallow Sleep")		5:23
6.	"Rouge" (ルージュ Rūju)		4:34
7.	"Tanjō" (誕生; "Birth")		6:50
8.	"Jidai" (時代; "Time Goes Around")	Remake recorded in 1993, single edit	4:32
9.	"Wakareuta" (わかれうた; "The Parting Song")		3:57
10.	"Hitori Jōzu" (ひとり上手; "Having Been Accustomed to Solitude")		4:12
11.	"Dōkoku" (慟哭; "I Cried All Night") (written by Nakajima and Tsugutoshi Gotō)		5:44
12.	"Ōkami ni Naritai" (狼になりたい; "I Want to Be a Wolf")		5:43
13.	"Tabibito no Uta" (旅人のうた; "Wanderer's Song")	Single version	5:56
14.	"Fight!" (ファイト! Faito!)		7:05

== Chart positions ==
Year	Album	Chart	Position	Weeks	Sales
1996	Daiginjō	Japanese Oricon Weekly Albums Chart (Top 100)	1	18	633,000
2002	Daiginjō [Reissue]	Japanese Oricon Weekly Albums Chart (Top 300)	78	11	633,000

== Release history ==
Country	Date	Label	Format	Catalog number
Japan	March 21, 1996	Pony Canyon/AARD-VARK	CD	PCCA-00897
Japan	March 21, 1996	Pony Canyon/AARD-VARK	Cassette tape	PCTA-00239
Japan	March 21, 1996	Pony Canyon/AARD-VARK	MD	PCYA-00015
Japan	February 20, 2002	Yamaha Music Communications	CD	YCCW-00034
