= Miyuki Nakajima =

Musical artist (born 1952)

- Born: 中島 美雪 (Nakajima Miyuki); February 23, 1952 (age 74)
- Origin: Sapporo, Hokkaidō, Japan
- Genres: Kayokyoku; folk; rock; enka
- Occupations: Singer; songwriter; radio-DJ
- Instruments: Vocals; guitar
- Years active: 1975–present
- Labels: AARD-VARK/Pony Canyon; Yamaha Music Communications
- Website: www.miyuki.jp

Miyuki Nakajima (中島 みゆき, Nakajima Miyuki) (born February 23, 1952, Sapporo, Hokkaidō, Japan) is a Japanese singer-songwriter and radio personality. She has released 44 studio albums, 48 singles, 6 live albums and multiple compilations as of January 2020. Her sales have been estimated at more than 21 million copies.

In the mid-1970s, Nakajima signed to Canyon Records and launched her recording career with her debut single, "Azami Jō no Lullaby" (アザミ嬢のララバイ). Rising to fame with the hit "The Parting Song (Wakareuta)", released in 1977, she has since had a successful career as a singer-songwriter, primarily in the early 1980s. Four of her singles have sold more than one million copies in the last two decades, including "Earthly Stars (Unsung Heroes)", a theme song for the Japanese television documentary series Project X.

Nakajima performed in experimental theater ("Yakai") every year-end from 1989 through 1998. The idiosyncratic acts featured scripts and songs she wrote, and have continued irregularly in recent years.

In addition to her work as a solo artist, Nakajima has written over 90 compositions for numerous other singers and has produced several chart-toppers. Many cover versions of her songs have been performed by Asian (particularly Taiwan and Hong Kong) singers. She is the only musician to have participated in the National Language Council of Japan.

== Early life ==
Miyuki Nakajima (中島 美雪, Nakajima Miyuki) was born in February 1952 in Sapporo, the capital city of Hokkaidō. Her grandfather, Buichi (武市), was a Hokkaido politician, and her father, Shinichiro (眞一郎), ran a clinic in obstetrics and gynecology. Her family moved to Iwanai when she was five, and lived there for six years. She spent most of her teenage years in the city of Obihiro, where she was one of the most eminent graduates of Obihiro Hakuyou High School, along with singer-songwriter Miwa Yoshida and television announcer Shinichiro Azumi. She graduated from Sapporo's Fuji Women's University in 1974.

Nakajima gave her first live performance during her third year in high school, playing a song she wrote titled "Tsugumi no Uta" onstage at a cultural festival.

In 1972, she played in a folk contest at the Hibiya Open-Air Concert Hall in Tokyo, winning the songwriting prize for her "Atashi Tokidoki Omouno". The song, included in the contest album, became her first recorded material.

After graduating college, Nakajima continued to pursue a career as a professional musician for nearly a year.

== Career as a recording artist ==
=== Early career (1975–1980) ===
In May 1975, her composition "Kizutsuita Tsubasa (Wings of Love – I Knew Nothing)" won a prize at the 9th Popular Song Contest organized by the Yamaha Music Foundation. After signing a contract with Yamaha and Canyon Records, she debuted with a single "Azami Jō no Lullaby", which was released in September 1975. In October, Nakajima entered the Popular Song Contest with another song, "Jidai", which won the prize. The song also won the grand-prix of the 6th World Popular Song Festival, another award organized by Yamaha, which was held in December.

In May 1976, she released her first studio album, Watashi no Koe ga Kikoemasuka. In 1976, Nakajima composed her first number-one hit single, "Abayo", which was recorded by Naoko Ken, and sold more than 700,000 copies.

Throughout her over 40-year career, she has written over 100 songs for other artists, including "Shiawase Shibai" (recorded by Junko Sakurada), "Kamome wa Kamome" (a comeback single for Ken, released in 1978), and "If I Could Take to the Sky (Kono Sora wo Tobetara)" (performed by Tokiko Kato, released in 1978). Nakajima occasionally released retrospective albums, composed of songs written for other artists. The first one, Okaerinasai, released in 1979, has sold more than 500,000 units, and it became one of her best-selling albums.

Miyuki Nakajima's fifth single "Wakareuta (The Parting Song)", released in September 1977, became her commercial breakthrough as a singer. The song reached number one on the Oricon for one week in December 1977, knocking "Wanted (Shimei Tehai)" by Pink Lady from the top of the hit parade. "The Parting Song" has sold more than 700,000 copies.

Her fourth studio album, entitled Aishiteiru to Ittekure, reinforced her enduring popularity as a performer. The album, which featured "The Parting Song", also included a protest song entitled "Sejou (World's Context)", which became popular after it was used in the TV drama Kimpachi Sensei in 1981.

In addition to her career as a recording artist, Nakajima has appeared as a personality on radio programs. She hosted All Night Nippon, one of the longest-running programs aired by the Nippon Broadcasting System, from April 1979 through March 1987.

=== 1980s: Commercial peak ===
Nakajima experienced her commercial heyday in the first half of the 1980s. Seven of her studio albums that were released during this time (from Ikiteitemo Iidesuka to Miss M.) reached number one on the Oricon Charts successively. "Akujo" was released as a single in autumn 1981 and became her first number one on the Oricon singles chart since "Wakareuta" in 1977. Kansuigyo, her eighth studio album, featured another interpretation of "Akujo", and was her most commercially successful LP. The album peaked at number one on the Oricon for six weeks, and reached the top of the Japanese year-end albums chart of 1982. In the same year, she produced a couple of top three charting singles, "Yuwaku" and "Unrequited Love."

As a composer and lyricist, Nakajima continued to write for other artists. "Suzume (Sparrow)", the first solo single for ex-Pink Lady member Keiko Masuda, led the performer to the top 10 spot once again. In 1983, Nakajima won the 25th Japan Record Award for her songwriting on "Haru na no ni", a song sung by then-teenage pop icon Yoshie Kashiwabara.

"Cold Farewell (Tsumetai Wakare)", released as a single in 1985, was the first song she produced in countries outside Japan. The top 10-charting song features a lengthy harmonica solo performed by Stevie Wonder. He also played the synthesizer on Nakajima's subsequent single "Atai no Natsuyasumi", released the following year.

In 1987, Nakajima contributed lyrics for a composition by Tsugutoshi Goto, a bassist and a record producer who had been a longtime collaborator with her.

Nakajima wrote lyrics for pop song "Fu-ji-tsu" in 1988. It was released as a fourth single by teen idol Shizuka Kudo, who was also well known as an ex-member of Onyanko Club. During the late 1980s and early 1990s, Nakajima and Goto wrote 17 songs for Kudo, and some of them topped the chart, including "Dōkoku" (I Cried All Night) released in 1993 and certified quadruple platinum by the RIAJ for shipments of in excess of a million copies. Her songwriting partnership with Goto ended in 1993, but Nakajima has continued to write several songs for Kudo in later years.

=== Project with Ichizo Seo and Yakai ===
Nakajima worked with longtime co-record producer Ichizo Seo for the first time on the album Goodbye Girl, released in 1988. Nakajima, highly satisfied with the recording of the album, considered Seo to the most appropriate musical partner for her, and she has been working with him since the end of the 1980s.

After enlisting a new collaborator, Nakajima launched the experimental musical Yakai at the Bunkamura Theatre Cocoon, in Shibuya, Tokyo. Yakai was composed of intricate story lines she wrote, and it started initially as jukebox music mainly comprising her previously released songs. Her idiosyncratic efforts gradually became stage performances which she performed every December for 10 years. Since the 7th act, entitled 2/2, in 1995, Yakai was composed of new songs she composed especially for the performance. Most of these performances have been released on DVDs.

Since the 1990s, Nakajima gradually began to appear on several television programs and commercials, although she continuously rejected offers to appear on the pop music television shows. In 1992, Nakajima appeared on the television drama Shin'ai Naru Mono e (titled after her 1979 studio album), performing a role as a doctor on the first and last episodes.

From 1993 through 2000, Nakajima appeared regularly on TV commercials for the Japan's Ministry of Posts and Telecommunications. The commercials (most of them featuring a new rendition of her early song, "Time Goes Around", recorded in 1993) were aired during the Bon Festival and holiday seasons in Japan.

"Asai Nemuri (Shallow Sleep)", a theme song Nakajima wrote for the drama Shin'ai Naru Mono e, was released as a single and found success, selling more than a million copies and peaking on the charts at number two. It was included on her studio album East Asia released in October 1992. The album also featured "Ito (Thread)", one of her songs that has been covered by many artists, especially famous for the interpretation by Kazutoshi Sakurai and Takeshi Kobayashi's charity supergroup Bank Band. Nakajima's song "Thread" (Japanese: 糸, Hepburn: Ito) is the inspiration of the 2020 film Threads: Our Tapestry of Love. Regarding the film adaptation, Nakajima commented: "Every time I hear different people sing the song I'm amazed at how it takes on different colors. I'm looking forward to seeing a new version of 'Tapestry' through this film."

In the middle of the decade, she wrote a couple of theme songs for Ienakiko, the TV drama series starring Yumi Adachi, which was aired on the NTV. The song, titled "Sora to Kimi no Aida ni (Between the Sky and You)", was released as a single in May 1994, and debuted at number one on the Japanese Singles Chart. The song became her most commercially successful record to-date, selling in excess of 1.4 million copies. The other song, her composition "Wanderers Song", was featured on the sequel of the drama series aired the following year. It also gained similar success, reaching number one on the charts and selling over 1 million units.

In March 1996 she released a greatest hits compilation, Daiginjo, which reached number one on the Oricon album chart, making her the oldest female artist to produce a number one album on the Japanese music chart at that time (the record was overtaken by Yumi Matsutoya and Mariya Takeuchi in later years).

However, each of her studio albums released in the 1990s were commercially lackluster, and some of them failed to reach the top 10 on the charts. Sun: Wings and Moon: Wings released in 1999, were her lowest-selling albums. Both albums have sold less than 50,000 copies.

She is known as the first and the only musician who was a participant of the National Language Council of Japan, in which she took part in the late 1990s.

=== 2000s ===
A quarter of a century after her debut, Miyuki Nakajima left the Pony Canyon label and moved to the newly founded Yamaha Music Communications. There, she released a double A-side single "Earthly Stars (Unsung Heroes)"/"Headlight Taillight", which later became her most well-known songs. She wrote the songs as theme songs for Project X, a television documentary program which premiered on NHK in March 2000. The single debuted at number 15 on the Oricon in July 2000, and it continued charting for over two years. To express her thanks for the unexpected commercial success of the theme songs of Project X, Nakajima decided to appear on the 53rd annual music program Kōhaku Uta Gassen, aired by the NHK on New Year's Eve of 2002, her first live performance on television since the late 1970s.

In 2006, Nakajima wrote the song "Sorafune (Ship in the Air)" for the boy band Tokio. The song was used as the closing theme for My Boss, My Hero, the TV drama starring the group's frontman Tomoya Nagase. It became the second most commercially successful material for the band, which followed their debut single, and remained on the Oricon chart for more than a year, selling approximately 480,000 copies. "Ship in the Air" was also the first chart-topper to which Nakajima contributed both lyrics and melody for other artists in 30 years, since "Abayo" was recorded by Naoko Ken in 1976. A month after the release of her studio album Lullaby Singer, which featured her own interpretation of "Ship in the Air", her contribution for the Tokio won "best lyrics" of the 48th Japan Record Award.

The studio album entitled I Love You, Do You Hear Me? was released on October 3, 2007. The album debuted at number four on the Oricon with in excess of 39,000 copies sold in its first week of release, and it provided Nakajima with her 34th top ten hit on the Japanese albums charts.

=== 2010s ===
In 2012, Nakajima wrote and performed the closing song "Onshirazu" (恩知らず) for the Japanese television series Tokyo Zenryoku Shoujo. She also made a cameo appearance in the first episode.

In 2014, Nakajima wrote and composed the song "Naite mo Iin Da yo" for the Japanese idol group Momoiro Clover Z. It was released on May 8, 2014. The song was used as the theme song for the film Akumu-chan: The Movie.

Nakajima performed the opening theme song to the 2014 NHK morning drama Massan, entitled "Mugi no Uta" (Wheat Song). She performed this song at the 64th Kōhaku Uta Gassen in the same year.

== Honors ==
In November 2009, Nakajima was awarded a Medal of Honor with purple ribbon by the Government of Japan.

== Discography ==
=== Studio albums ===
- Watashi no Koe ga Kikoemasuka (私の声が聞こえますか) (1976)
- Minna Itte Shimatta (みんな去ってしまった) (1976)
- A Ri Ga To U (あ・り・が・と・う) (1977)
- Aishiteiru to Ittekure (愛していると云ってくれ) (1978)
- Shin-ai Naru Mono e (親愛なる者へ) (1979)
- Okaerinasai (おかえりなさい) (1979)
- Ikiteitemo Iidesuka (生きていてもいいですか) (1980)
- Month of Parturition (臨月, Ringetsu)" (1981)
- Kansuigyo (寒水魚) (1982)
- Hunch (予感, Yokan) (1983)
- How Do You Do (はじめまして, Hajimemashite) (1984)
- Change (御色なおし, Oiro Naoshi) (1985)
- miss M. (1985)
- 36.5°C (1986)
- Miyuki Nakajima (中島みゆき, Nakajima Miyuki) (1988)
- Goodbye Girl (グッバイ ガール, Gubbai Gāru) (1988)
- Kaikinetsu(回帰熱) (1989)
- Yoru wo Yuke (夜を往け) (1990)
- Utadeshika Ienai (歌でしか言えない) (1991)
- East Asia (1992)
- Jidai (時代～Time Goes Around, Time Goes Around) (1993)
- Love or Nothing (1994)
- 10 Wings (1995)
- Paradise Cafe (パラダイス・カフェ, Paradaisu Kafe) (1996)
- Be Like My Child (わたしの子供になりなさい, Watashi no Kodomo ni Narinasai) (1998)
- Sun: Wings (日-WINGS, Hi -Uingusu-) (1999)
- Moon: Wings (月-WINGS, Tsuki -Uingusu-) (1999)
- Short Stories (短編集, Tanpenshū) (2000)
- Lullaby for the Soul (心守歌, Kokoromoriuta) (2001)
- Otogibanashi: Fairy Ring (おとぎばなし -Fairy Ring-, Otogibanashi -Fearī Ringu) (2002)
- Love Letter (恋文, Koibumi) (2003)
- Ima no Kimochi (いまのきもち) (2004)
- Ten-Sei (転生, Tensei) (2005)
- Lullaby Singer (ララバイSINGER, Rarabai Shingā) (2006)
- I Love You, Do You Hear Me? (I Love You, 答えてくれ, Ai Ravu Yū, Kotaetekure) (2007)
- Drama! (2009)
- Midnight Zoo (真夜中の動物園, Mayonaka no Dōbutsuen) (2010)
- From the Icy Reaches (荒野より, Kōya Yori) (2011)
- Night-Light (常夜灯, Jōyatō) (2012)
- Hard Problems (問題集, Mondaishū) (2014)
- Musical Suite (組曲 (Suite), Kumikyoku (Suīto) (2015)
- Sōmon (相聞, Sōmon) (2017)
- Contralto (コントラアルト, kontoraaruto) (2020)
- The Day the World Looks Different (世界が違って見える日, sekaigachigattemieruhi) (2023)

== Filmography ==
Year	Title	Role
1985	Yousei Florence	Fairy Musica (voice)
1997	Tokyo Biyori	Bar hostess
2005	Sayonara Color	Doctor Iwaodake
2005	Glass no Tsukai (Dreaming of Light)	Itoko, the Fortune-teller
2006	The Mamiya Brothers	Junko Mamiya

== Live performances ==
=== Tours ===
- 1977 Spring Concert
- 1977 Autumn Concert
- 1978 Spring Tour
- 1978 Autumn Tour
- 1979 Spring Tour
- 1979 Autumn Tour
- Miyuki Nakajima Concert (1980 Autumn Tour)
- Sabishiki Tomo e (寂しき友へ) (1981)
- Sabishiki Tomo e II (寂しき友へII) (1982)
- Utahime (浮汰姫) (1982–83)
- Nakajima Miyuki Concert Fuku Koro ni (蕗く季節に) (1982–83)
- Nakajima Miyuki Concert '84 Asu wo Ute! (明日を撃て!) (1984)
- Nakajima Miyuki Concert '84 Gekkou no Utage (月光の宴) (1984–85)
- Nakajima Miyuki Concert '85 No Thank You (のぅさんきゅう, Nousankyu) (1985)
- Nakajima Miyuki Concert '85 Utagoyomi (歌暦) Page 85" (1985)
- Nakajima Miyuki Concert '86 Gobanme no Kisetsu (五番目の季節) " (1986)
- Nakajima Miyuki Concert '86 Utagoyomi (歌暦) Page 86 "Koiuta (恋唄) " (1986)
- Miyuki Nakajima Concert '87 "Suppin Vol.1" (1987)
- Nakajima Miyuki Concert 1989 Nousagi no You ni (野ウサギのように) " (1989)
- Concert Tour '90 "Night Wings" (1990)
- Concert "Carnival 1992" (1992)
- Concert Tour '93 "East Asia" (1993)
- Concert '95 "Love or Nothing" (1995)
- Concert Tour '97 "Paradise Cafe" (1997)
- Concert Tour '98 (1998)
- XXIc. 1st. (2001)
- Concert Tour 2005
- Concert Tour 2007
- Nakajima Miyuki Tour 2010
- Nakajima Miyuki Enkai (縁会) 2012–2013
- Nakajima Miyuki Yakai Koujo (夜会工場) VOL.1 (2013)
- Nakajima Miyuki Concert「Ichi E (一会)」2015-2016
- Nakajima Miyuki Yakai Koujo (夜会工場) VOL.2 (2018)
- Nakajima Miyuki 2020 Last Tour (ラスト・ツアー「結果オーライ」)

=== Yakai ===
- Yakai (夜会) (1989)
- Yakai 1990 (夜会1990) (1990)
- Yakai Vol.3 Kan-Tan (邯鄲) (1991)
- Yakai Vol.4 Kinkanshoku(金環蝕) (1992)
- Yakai Vol.5 "Hana no Iro wa Utsuri ni keri na Itazura ni Waga Mi Yo ni Furu Nagame Seshi Ma ni" (「花の色はうつりにけりないたづらに わが身世にふるながめせし間に」) (1993)
- Yakai Vol.6 Shangri-La (シャングリラ) (1994)
- Yakai Vol.7 2/2 (1995)
- Yakai Vol.8 Tou Onna (問う女) (1996)
- Yakai Vol.9 2/2 (1997)
- Yakai Vol.10 Kaishou (海嘯) (1998)
- Yakai Vol.11 Winter Garden (2000)
- Yakai Vol.12 Winter Garden (2002)
- Yakai Vol.13 24-ji Chaku 0-ji Hatsu (24時着0時発) (2004)
- Yakai Vol.14 24-ji Chaku 00-ji Hatsu (24時着00時発) (2006)
- Yakai Vol.15 Ganso Konbanya (元祖・今晩屋) (2008–09)
- Yakai Vol.16 Honke Konbanya (本家・今晩屋) (2009)
- Yakai Vol.17 2/2 (2012)
- Yakai Vol.18 Hashi no shita no Arukadia (橋の下のアルカディア) (2014)
- Yakai Vol.19 Hashi no shita no Arukadia (橋の下のアルカディア) (2016)
- Yakai Vol.20 Little Tokyo (リトル・トーキョー) (2019)

== Awards ==
Japan Record Awards
Year	Title	Category	Personnel
1976 (18th)	"Abayo"	Vocal Performance	(Performer: Naoko Ken / Composer and lyricist: Nakajima / Arranger: Kuni Kawauchi)
1978 (20th)	"Shiawase Shibai"	Gold Prize	(Performer: Junko Sakurada / Composer and lyricist: Nakajima / Arranger: Kei Wakakusa)
1981 (23rd)	Month of Parturition (Ringetsu)	Best 10 Albums	(Performer, composer, lyricist and producer: Nakajima / Arrangers: Katz Hoshi, Hiromi Yasuda, Mitsuo Hagita, Masataka Matsutoya)
1982 (24th)	Kansuigyo	Best Albums/Best 10 Albums	(Performer, composer, lyricist and producer: Nakajima / Arrangers: Nozomi Aoki, Masataka Matsutoya, Tsugutoshi Goto)
1983 (25th)	"Haru na no ni"	Best Songwriting	(Lyricist and producer: Nakajima / Performer: Yoshie Kashiwabara / Arranger: Katsuhisa Hattori)
1984 (26th)	"Saiai"	Gold Prize	(Performer: Yoshie Kashiwabara / Lyricist and composer: Nakajima / arranger: Nobuo Kurata)
1988 (30th)	"Mugo, n... Iroppoi"	Gold Prize	(Performer: Shizuka Kudo / Lyricist: Nakajima / Composer, producer and arranger: Tsugutoshi Goto)
1992 (34th)	East Asia	Best 10 Albums	(Performer, composer, lyricist and producer: Nakajima / Co-producer and arranger: Ichizo Seo)
2006 (48th)	"Ship in the Air (Sorafune)"	Best Lyrics	(Performer: Tokio / Lyricist and composer: Nakajima / Arranger and producer: Motoki Funayama)

Japan Gold Disc Award
Year	Song	Category	Personnel
1989 (4th)	"Kousa ni Fukarete"	Five Best-selling Singles of year	(Performer: Shizuka Kudo / Lyricist: Nakajima / Composer, producer and arranger: Tsugutoshi Goto)
1994 (9th)	"Between the Sky and You (Sora to Kimi no Aida ni)"/"Fight!"	Five Best-selling Singles of year	(Performer, composer, lyricist and producer: Nakajima / Co-producer and arranger: Ichizo Seo, Takayuki Inoue)

== Kōhaku Uta Gassen Appearances ==
Year	#	Song	No.	VS	Remarks
2002 (Heisei 14)/53rd	1	Chijou No Hoshi/Heddoraito Teruraito (地上の星)	23/27	Shinji Tanimura	
2014 (Heisei 26)/65th	2	Mugi No Uta (麦の唄)	22/23	Akihiro Miwa	Second Finale, Returned after 12 years

== Video games ==
- Nakajima Miyuki Namiromu (Sony PlayStation, October 15, 1998)

== See also ==
- List of best-selling music artists in Japan
