= Love or Nothing =

Studio album by Miyuki Nakajima
- Released: October 21, 1994
- Recorded: Old AIR Azabu Studio, Burnish Stone, Z'd, Sound Inn, ARC Garret, Andora Studios and A&M Recording Studios
- Genre: Folk rock, Kayōkyoku
- Length: 61:00
- Language: Japanese
- Label: Pony Canyon/AARD-VARK, Yamaha Music Communications
- Producer: Ichizo Seo, Miyuki Nakajima

Miyuki Nakajima chronology
Jidai: Time Goes Around (1993)	Love or Nothing (1994)	10 Wings (1995)

Love or Nothing is the 22nd studio album by Japanese singer-songwriter Miyuki Nakajima, released in October 1994.

The album produced one of her most successful hit singles "Between the Sky and You", which reached number-one on the Japanese Oricon chart. The song was featured in Ienakiko, the movie sequel movie to a TV drama series of the same title.

The number one success of "Between the Sky and You" led to the album Love or Nothing debuting at number-one on the Oricon chart, becoming her last chart-topping non-compilation album to date. Upon its release, the album gained Platinum certification by the Recording Industry Association of Japan for shipments of over 400,000 copies.

== Track listing ==
All songs written and composed by Miyuki Nakajima, arranged by Ichizō Seo (except "Between the Sky and You", "Tenbin Bakari" and "Don't Fall Asleep" co-arranged by David Campbell).

1. "Between the Sky and You (空と君のあいだに, Sora to Kimi no Aida ni)" – 5:00
2. "Mou Sanbashi ni Akari wa Tomoranai (もう桟橋に灯りは点らない)" – 5:40
3. "Rosemary Future (バラ色の未来, Bara Iro no Mirai)" – 5:21
4. "Himawari -Sunward- (ひまわり"Sunward")" – 5:23
5. "Antenna no Machi (アンテナの街)" – 5:23
6. "Tenbin Bakari (てんびん秤)" – 4:51
7. "Ryuusei (流星)" – 6:08
8. "Yume Dattandane (夢だったんだね)" – 5:43
9. "Kaze ni Naranaika (風にならないか)" – 4:52
10. "You Never Need Me" – 8:26
11. "Don't Fall Asleep (眠らないで, Nemuranaide)" – 4:12

== Personnel ==
- Shigeru Suzuki – electric guitar
- Nozomi Furukawa – electric guitar
- Tsuyoshi Kon – Electric, Electric slide, pedal steel and dobro guitars
- Chūei Yoshikawa – Nylon guitar
- Tsugutoshi Gotō – bass guitar
- Yasuo Tomikura – bass guitar
- Akira Okazawa – bass guitar
- Nobuo Kurata – Acoustic Piano, Hammond B3 and keyboards
- Jun Aoyama – drums, marching drums
- Eiji Shimamura – drums
- Toshihiko Furumura – Tenor sax
- Bill Bergman – Tenor sax
- Don Markese – Baritone sax
- Dennis Farias – Trumpet
- Andy Martin – Trombone
- Jon Clarke – Oboe, tin whistle
- Julia Waters – Background vocals
- Maxine Waters – Background vocals
- Oren Waters – Background vocals
- EVE – Background vocals
- Monalisa Young – Background vocals
- Joseph Powell – Background vocals
- Suginami Jidou Chorus – Background vocals
- David Campbell – Strings conductor
- Joel Derouin – Strings concertmaster
- Suzie Katayama – String contractor

== Production ==
- Producer and arranger: Ichizo Seo
- Composer, Writer, Producer and performer: Miyuki Nakajima
- Arranger:Nobuo Kurata, David Campbell
- Engineer: Tad Gotoh, Joe Chiccarelli, Kengo Katoh
- Mixer: Hiroshi Tokunaga, Tomotaka Takehara, Mike Baumagerther
- A&R: Yuzo Watanabe, Kohichi Suzuki
- Assistant: Katsuhisa Oura, Hideki Kodera, Junichi Hohrin, Yuichi Inoue, Mitsuyoshi Kishida, Koh Yamashita, Tomoaki Satoh, Atsushi Matsui, Bino Espinozza, Randy Wine
- Assistant for Producer: Tomoo Satoh
- Artist Promotor: Yoshio Kan
- Disc Promotor: Narihiko Yoshida, Shoko Sone
- Music Coordinator – Takashi Kimura, Fumio Miyata, Tomoko Takaya, Ruriko Duer, Sam Onoda
- Photographer and art director: Jin Tamura
- Designer: Hirofumi Arai
- Costume: Norio Suzuki
- Hair and make-up: Noriko Izumisawa
- Location Coordinator: Tomiki Sugimura
- Artist Management: Kohji Suzuki
- Assistant: Maki Nishida
- Management Desk: Atsuko Hayashi
- General Management: Takahiro Uno
- DAD – Genichi Kawakami

== Charts ==
=== Weekly charts ===
Chart (1994)	Position
Japanese Oricon Albums Chart	1
Japanese Oricon Albums Chart	11 †

†: Limited edition issued on APO-CD

=== Year-end charts ===
Chart (1994)	Position
Japanese Albums Chart	75

=== Certifications ===
Region	Certification	Certified units/sales
Japan (RIAJ)	Platinum	370,000
