= Shin'ai Naru Mono e =

Shin-ai Naru Mono e

Studio album by Miyuki Nakajima
- Released: March 21, 1979
- Recorded: Epicurus and Take One Studios (Tokyo, Japan)
- Genre: Folk
- Length: 46:24
- Label: AARD-VARK/Canyon, Yamaha Music Communications
- Producer: Miyuki Nakajima

Miyuki Nakajima chronology
Aishiteiru to Ittekure (1978)	Shin-ai Naru Mono e (1979)	Okaerinasai (1979)

Shin-ai Naru Mono e (親愛なる者へ) is the fifth studio album by Japanese singer-songwriter Miyuki Nakajima, released in March 1979.

The album is best known for the track "Ōkami ni Naritai", which has been one of fan favorites and later included on the compilation album Daiginjo released in 1996. It gained another public attention in the late 1990s, through the TV ad for Otsuka Pharmaceutical Co.'s energy drink which features the song.

Shin-ai Naru Mono e was relatively successful upon its release, although there was no lead single before the album came out. It debuted at the number-three on the Oricon LP chart and climbed the summit of there in April 1979, providing her with the first number-one spot on the album chart.

== Track listing ==
All songs written and composed by Miyuki Nakajima

=== Side one ===
All tracks arranged by Takahiko Ishikawa (except "Taxi Driver" and "Neyuki" arranged by Shun Fukui)

1. "Hadashi de Hashire (裸足で走れ)" - 4:38
2. "Taxi Driver (タクシー ドライバー)" - 6:09
3. "Doroumi no Naka kara (泥海の中から)" - 3:01
4. "What is Hard to Believe (信じ難いもの, Shinjigatai Mono)" - 3:08
5. "Neyuki (根雪)" - 6:23

=== Side two ===
All tracks arranged by Shun Fukui (except "Koishi no You ni" and "Ōkami ni Naritai" arranged by Takahiko Ishikawa)

1. "Kataomoi (片想)" - 2:34
2. "Dial 117 (ダイヤル117)" - 4:25
3. "Koishi no You ni (小石のように)" - 3:36
4. "Ōkami ni Naritai (狼になりたい)" - 5:42
5. "Dangai —Shin-ai Naru Mono e (断崖—親愛なる者へ)" - 6:48

== Personnel ==
- Miyuki Nakajima - Lead vocal, acoustic guitar
- Takahiko Ishikawa - Acoustic guitar, banjo
- Kiyoshi Sugimoto - Acoustic guitar
- Shigeru Suzuki - Electric guitar
- Ken Yajima - Electric guitar
- Graham Thumb Picking Power - Electric bass
- Hiro Tsunoda - Drums
- Tatsuo Hayashi - Drums
- Nobu Saito - Percussion
- Pecker - Percussion
- Jake H. Conception - Saxophone
- Shunzo Sunahara - Flute
- Makiko Tashiro - Keyboards
- Kentaro Haneda - Keyboards

== Production ==
- Recording director: Yoshio Okujima
- Recording and mixing engineer: Yoshihiko Kaminari
- Remixing and mixing engineer: Kinji Yoshino
- Assistant engineer: Kouji Sakakibara
- Promoter: Yoshiki Ishikawa
- Manager: Hiroshi Kojima
- Assistant promotional manager: Kunio Kaneko
- Designer: Hirofumi Arai
- Art director: Jin Tamura
- Costume designer: Mihoko Kiyokawa
- Producer: Miyuki Nakajima
- General producer: Genichi Kawakami

Recorded at Epicurus and Take One Studios, special thanks to Kochibi

== Chart positions ==
Year	Album	Country	Chart	Position	Sales
1979	Shin-ai Naru Mono e	Japan	Oricon Weekly LP Albums Chart (top 100)	1	327,000
1979	Shin-ai Naru Mono e	Japan	Oricon Weekly CT Albums Chart (top 100)	7	327,000

== Release history ==
Country	Date	Format	Label	Catalog number
Japan	March 21, 1979	LP	Canyon Records	C25A-0031
Japan	March 21, 1979	Audio cassette	Pony	25P-7041
Japan	March 1, 1981	LP	Canyon Records	C28A-0147
Japan	May 21, 1981	Audio cassette	Pony	28P-6070
Japan	December 1, 1983	CD	Canyon Records	D35A-0027
Japan	November 5, 1986	CD	Canyon Records	D32A-0232
Japan	March 21, 1989	CD	Pony Canyon	D35A-0457
Japan	May 21, 1990	CD	Pony Canyon	PCCA-00074
Japan	April 18, 2001	CD	Yamaha Music Communications	YCCW-00008
Japan	October 1, 2008	CD	Yamaha Music Communications	YCCW-10057

== See also ==
- 1979 in Japanese music
