= Minna Itte Shimatta =

Studio album by Miyuki Nakajima
- Released: October 25, 1976
- Genre: Folk
- Length: 41:36
- Label: AARD-VARK/Canyon Records
- Producer: Genichi Kawakami

Miyuki Nakajima chronology
Watashi no Koe ga Kikoemasuka (1976)	Minna Itte Shimatta (1976)	A Ri Ga To U (1977)

Min'na Itte Shimatta (みんな去ってしまった, Min'na itte shimatta; lit. "Everyone has Left") is the second studio album by Japanese singer-songwriter Miyuki Nakajima, released in October 1976.

== Track listing ==
All songs written and composed by Miyuki Nakajima.

1. "Ame ga Sora wo Suteru Hi wa (雨が空を捨てる日は)" -2:56
2. "Kanojo no Ikikata (彼女の生き方)" - 4:07
3. "Truck ni Nosete (トラックに乗せて)" 3:49
4. "Sasurai no Uta (流浪の詩)" - 5:01
5. "Massugu na Sen (真直な線)" - 3:57
6. "Itsutsu no Koro (五才の頃)" -3:32
7. "Fuyu wo Matsu Kisetsu (冬を待つ季節)" - 2:41
8. "Yokaze no Nakakara (夜風の中から)" [Album Version] - 4:19
9. "03 Ji (03時)" - 2:47
10. "Usotsuki ga Sukiyo (うそつきが好きよ)" - 2:30
11. "Yaiteru Wake ja Naikeredo (妬いてる訳じゃないけれど)" -2:17
12. "Wasurerareru Mono Naraba (忘れられるものならば)" - 3:40

== Chart position ==
- Chart - Oricon (Japan)

Chart	Position	Weeks	Sales
Weekly LP Albums Chart (Top 100)	23	50	100,000+

== See also ==
- 1976 in Japanese music
