= Miyuki Nakajima (album) =

Studio album by Miyuki Nakajima
- Released: March 16, 1988
- Recorded: 1987, at the Peninsula, Wonder Station, Music Inn, Sound Inn, Hitokuchizaka
- Genre: Folk rock
- Length: 48:55
- Label: Pony Canyon/AARD-VARK
- Producer: Kazuo Shiina; Miyuki Nakajima (credited to "miss M.")

Miyuki Nakajima chronology
36.5°C (1986)	Miyuki Nakajima (1988)	Goodbye Girl (1988)

Miyuki Nakajima (中島みゆき, Nakajima Miyuki) is the album by the Japanese singer-songwriter Miyuki Nakajima, released in March 1988.

Her 15th studio album features two songs released as a single, "Gokigen Ikaga" and "Kamen". The former was used in the Japanese Ministry of Posts and Telecommunications' TV ad starring by Nakajima, aired c. 1995. The latter was co-written by Yoshihiro Kai, a frontman of the Kai Band.

== Track listing ==
All songs written and composed by Miyuki Nakajima, unless otherwise noted.

=== Side one ===
All songs arranged by Kazuo Shiina (except "Doro wa Furishikiru" arranged by Joe Hisaishi)

1. "Wangan 24-Ji (湾岸24時)" – 6:31
2. "Gokigen Ikaga (御機嫌如何)" – 4:14
3. "High Summer Waves (土用波, Doyounami)" – 4:29
4. "Doro wa Furishikiru (泥は降りしきる)" – 4:11
5. "Musician (ミュージシャン, Myūjishan)" – 5:00

=== Side two ===
All songs arranged by Kazuo Shiina (except "Cleansing Cream" arranged by Joe Hisaishi)

1. "Kiiroi Inu (黄色い犬)" – 7:31
2. "Kamen (仮面)" (Nakajima, Yoshihiro Kai) - 5:34
3. "Cleansing Cream (クレンジング クリーム, Kurenjingu kurīmu)" – 6:50
4. "Rolling (ローリング, Rōringu)" – 4:35

== Personnel ==
- Kōki Itō - bass guitar
- Hitoshi Watanabe - bass guitar
- Chūei Yoshikawa - acoustic guitar
- Kenji Kitajima - electric guitar
- Hideo Saito - electric guitar
- Takayuki Hijikata - electric guitar
- Kazuo Shiina - electric guitar, synthesizer
- Joe Hisaishi - synthesizer
- Yasuharu Nakanishi - piano
- Katsuhiko Kamizuna - hammond organ
- Jake H Conception - saxophone
- Jun Aoyama - drums
- Motoya Hamaguchi - percussion
- Kazuyo Sugimoto - backing vocals
- Yuiko Tsubokura - backing vocals
- Eve - backing vocals
- Kazuhito Murata - backing vocals
- Keisuke Yamamoto - backing vocals
- Joey McCoy - backing vocals
- Michael Wilson - backing vocals
- Miyuki Nakajima - lead vocal, backing vocals
- Keiji Azami - dulcimer
- Takashi Asahi - quena
- Aska Kaneko Group - strings
- Yūichi Tomaru - computer programming
- Yukari Hashimoto - computer programming

== Production ==
- Producer and Arranger: Kazuo Shiina
- Arranger: Joe Hisaishi (on "Doro wa Furishikiru" and "Cleansing Cream")
- Composer, Lyricist, Producer and Performer: Miyuki Nakajima (occasionally credit to "miss M" in association with Airando)
- Mixing Engineer: Larry Alexander
- Digitally mastering: Ted Jensen (at the Stering Sound, NYC)
- Engineer: Yasuo Satō, Takeshi Itō, Hiroshi "Pin" Satō, Masayoshi Ohkawa, Keishi Ikeda, Shun'ichi Yokoyama
- Assistant Engineer: Steve Boyer, Masato Tobisawa, Tōru Okitsu, Kazuyoshi Inoue, Hiroki Iijima, Tsuneharu Manda
- Photographer and Art Director: Jin Tamura
- Designer: Hirofumi Arai
- Visual Coordinator: Norio Murai, Meg Maruyama
- Music Coordinator: Takashi Kimura, Fumio Miyata
- Production Coordinator: Shizu Orishige
- Disc Promotor: Yoshio Kan, Seiki Ishikawa, Tsuyoshi Yamauchi
- Artist Management: Kohji Suzuki, Mizuho "Sranky" Shirato
- General Management: Takahiro "Woody" Uno
- A&R: Yūzō Watanabe
- Special Advice: Yoshihiro Kai
- DAD: Genichi Kawakami

== Charts ==
Chart (1988)	Peak position	Sales
Japan Oricon Weekly Albums Chart (Top 100)	3	160,000+

== Release history ==
Country	Date	Label	Format	Catalog number
Japan	March 16, 1988	Pony Canyon	LP	C28A-0625
Japan	March 16, 1988	Pony Canyon	audio cassette	28P-6783
Japan	March 16, 1988	Pony Canyon	CD	D32A-0351
Japan	March 21, 1989	Pony Canyon	CD	D35A-0467
Japan	May 21, 1990	Pony Canyon	CD	PCCA-00084
Japan	November 21, 2001	Yamaha Music Communications	CD	YCCW-00018
Japan	November 5, 2008	Yamaha Music Communications	CD	YCCW-10067

== See also ==
- 1988 in Japanese music
