= Ikiteite mo Ii Desu ka =

Ikiteitemo Iidesuka

Studio album by Miyuki Nakajima
- Released: April 5, 1980
- Recorded: Take One Studio, Tokyo, Japan
- Genre: Folk
- Length: 44:56
- Label: AARD-VARK/Canyon
- Producer: Miyuki Nakajima

Miyuki Nakajima chronology
Okaerinasai (1979)	Ikiteitemo Iidesuka (1980)	Month of Parturition (Ringetsu) (1981)

Ikiteitemo Iidesuka (生きていてもいいですか) is a seventh studio album by a Japanese singer-songwriter Miyuki Nakajima, released in April 1980.

== Track listing ==
All songs written and composed by Miyuki Nakajima, except an untitled interlude composed by Tsugutoshi Goto.

=== Side one ===
All songs arranged by Tsugutoshi Goto, except "Sobaya" co-arranged by Miyuki Nakajima

1. "Urami Masu (うらみ・ます)" – 7:27
2. "Nakitai Yoru ni (泣きたい夜に)" – 4:54
3. "Kitsune Gari no Uta (キツネ狩りの歌)" – 4:08
4. "Sobaya (蕎麦屋)" – 5:09

=== Side two ===
All songs arranged by Tsugutoshi Goto, except "Ikoku" co-arranged by Miyuki Nakajima

1. "Fune wo Dasu no Nara Kugatsu (船を出すのなら九月)" – 5:12
2. Untitled – 1:10
3. "Elaine (エレーン, Erēn)" – 7:44
4. "Ikoku (異国)" – 9:12

== Personnel ==
- Miyuki Nakajima - vocals, acoustic guitar
- Takahiko Ishikawa - acoustic guitar, flat mandolin
- Shigeru Suzuki - electric guitar
- Tsugutoshi Goto - electric bass
- Makiko Tashiro - keyboards
- Akira Nishimoto - keyboards
- Fumihiko Kazama - accordion
- Nobuo Yagi - harmonica
- Shin Kazuhara - piccolo trumpet
- Yukio Eto - flute, alto flute, bass flute
- Minoru Muraoka - shakuhachi
- Rien Takimoto - drums
- Hiro Tsunoda - drums
- Yas-Kaz Sato - Latin percussions
- Yoshihisa Tamano - violin
- Joe Ensemble - strings

== Chart positions ==
Year	Country	Chart	Position	Sales
1980	Japan	Oricon Weekly LP Albums Chart (top 100)	1	330,000
1980	Japan	Oricon Weekly CT Albums Chart (top 100)	1	330,000

== Release history ==
Country	Date	Format	Label	Catalog number
Japan	April 5, 1980	LP	Canyon Records	C25A-0089
Japan	April 5, 1980	Audio cassette	Pony	25P-7117
Japan	March 1, 1981	LP	Canyon Records	C28A-0149
Japan	May 21, 1981	Audio cassette	Pony	28P-6072
Japan	September 1, 1983	CD	Canyon Records	D35A-0018
Japan	November 5, 1986	CD	Canyon Records	D32A-0230
Japan	March 21, 1989	CD	Pony Canyon	D35A-0459
Japan	May 21, 1990	CD	Pony Canyon	PCCA-00076
Japan	April 18, 2001	CD	Yamaha Music Communications	YCCW-00010
Japan	October 1, 2008	CD	Yamaha Music Communications	YCCW-10059

== See also ==
- 1980 in Japanese music
