= I Love You, Do You Hear Me? =

Studio album by Miyuki Nakajima
- Released: October 3, 2007
- Genre: Folk rock
- Length: 57:21
- Label: Yamaha Music Communications
- Producer: Ichizo Seo, Miyuki Nakajima

Miyuki Nakajima chronology
Lullaby Singer (2006)	I Love You, Do You Hear Me? (2007)	Utatabi: Miyuki Nakajima Concert Tour 2007 (2008)

I Love You, Do You Hear Me? (I Love You, 答えてくれ, Ai Ravu Yū, Kotaetekure) is the 35th studio album by Japanese singer-songwriter Miyuki Nakajima, released in October 2007.

The albums features a smash hit single "Once in a Lifetime" and its B-Side "Here Comes the Ancient Rain", both songs were used in the documentary program entitled Sekai Ururun Taizaiki; Renaissance which was aired by TBS. The lead-off track, "Today, I'm a Novice" is her second contribution for the boy band Tokio which follows an award-winning hit "Ship in the Air".

== Track listing ==
All songs written and composed by Miyuki Nakajima

1. "Today, I'm a Novice (本日、未熟者, Honjitsu, Mijukumono)" – 5:32
2. "City of Faceless Strangers (顔のない街の中で, Kao no Nai Machi no Naka de)" – 4:06
3. "Words of Abounding Love for You (惜しみなく愛の言葉を, Oshiminaku Ai no Kotoba wo)" – 5:51
4. "Once in a Lifetime (一期一会, Ichigo Ichie)" – 5:33
5. "Survival Road" – 4:46
6. "Nobody is Right" – 5:59
7. "Ice Fish" – 4:29
8. "Body Talk" – 4:22
9. "Rock'n Roll in a Suit (背広の下のロックンロール, Sebiro no Shita no Rokkunroru)" – 5:56
10. "Here Comes the Ancient Rain (昔から雨が降ってくる, Mukashi kara Ame ga Futtekuru)" – 5:32
11. "I Love You, Do You Hear Me? (I Love You, 答えてくれ, Ai Ravu Yū, Kotaetekure)" – 5:15

== Personnel ==
- Miyuki Nakajima – vocals
- Kenny Aronoff – drums
- Nobuo Eguchi – drums
- Matt Laug – drums
- Neil Stubenhaus – electric bass
- Yasuo Tomikura – electric bass
- Reggie Hamilton – woodbass
- Michael Landau – electric guitar
- Nozomu Furukawa – electric guitar, slide guitar
- Michael Thompson – electric guitar, acoustic guitar
- Masayoshi Furukawa – acoustic guitar
- Randy Kerher – acoustic piano
- Jon Gilutin – acoustic piano, electric piano, keyboards, hammond organ
- Shingo Kobayashi – acoustic piano, keyboards, hammond organ, computer programming
- Ittetsu Gen – violin
- Hanako Uesato – violin
- Daisuke Kadowaki – violin
- Izumiko Fujitani – violin
- Yayoi Fujita – violin
- Maki Nagata – violin
- Kaoru Kuroki – violin
- Yoshiko Kaneko – violin
- Crusher Kimura – violin
- Yuko Kajitani – violin
- Leina Ushiyama – violin
- Aya Ito – violin
- Takao Ochiai – violin
- Maiko Hiraoka – violin
- Takuya Mori – violin
- Nobuko Kaiwa – violin
- Tami Janamoto – cello
- Masutami Endo – cello
- Seigen Tokuzawa – cello
- Masahiro Tanaka – cello
- Akina Karasawa – cello
- Kaori Morita – cello
- Masayo Inoue – cello
- Mia Minakami – cello
- Ichizo Seo – acoustic piano, backing vocals
- Satoshi Nakamura – saxophone
- Koji Nishimura – trumpet
- Taro Shizuoka – trombone
- Tomoyuki Asagawa – highland harp, grand harp
- Takashi Asahi – tin whistle
- Fumikazu Miyashita – backing vocals
- Yuiko Tsubokura – backing vocals
- Julia Waters – backing vocals
- Luther Waters – backing vocals
- Johnny Britt – backing vocals
- Eric Butler – backing vocals
- Will Wheaton – backing vocals
- Monalisa Young – backing vocals
- Kristle Murden – backing vocals
- Terry Wood – backing vocals
- Debbie Hall – backing vocals
- Karen Harper – backing vocals

== Chart position ==
Chart	Position
Japanese Oricon Weekly Albums Chart (top 200)	4
