= Hard Problems =

Studio album by Miyuki Nakajima
- Released: November 12, 2014

Miyuki Nakajima chronology
Night-Light (2012)	Hard Problems (2014)	Musical Suite (2015)

Hard Problems (問題集, Mondaishū) is the 40th studio album by Japanese singer-songwriter Miyuki Nakajima, released in 2014. The album contained the single "Mugi no uta", which was used as the theme song for the NHK drama Massan, and peaked at number four on the Billboard Japan Top Album Sales chart.

== Track listing ==
All songs written and composed by Miyuki Nakajima and arranged by Ichizo Seo.

1. "Love Poem (愛詞, Aikotoba)" – 5:27
2. "Song of the Wheat (麦の唄, Mugi no uta)" – 5:08
3. "What Do You Say to Joking? (ジョークにしないか, Jōku ni shinaika)" – 4:13
4. "Children's Hospital (病院童, Byōindō)"" – 4:56
5. "The Newborn's Cry (産声, Ubugoe)" – 6:26
6. "Hard Problems (問題集, Mondaishū)" – 4:09
7. "Tears Flowing Through the Body (身体の中を流れる涙, Karada no naka wo nagareru namida)" – 5:40
8. "Persia (ペルシャ, Perusha)" – 4:43
9. "A Night's Grass (一夜草, Ichiyasō)" – 5:17
10. "India Goose" – 6:17

== Personnel ==
- Miyuki Nakajima – Lead vocals
