= From the Icy Reaches =

Studio album by Miyuki Nakajima
- Released: November 16, 2011
- Genre: Folk rock
- Length: 58:48
- Language: Japanese
- Label: Yamaha Music Communications
- Producer: Ichizō Seo, Miyuki Nakajima

Miyuki Nakajima chronology
Midnight Zoo (2010)	From the Icy Reaches (2011)	Night-light (2012)

Singles from From the Icy Reaches
- 1. "From the Icy Reaches"/"Tapir" Released: October 26, 2011

From the Icy Reaches (荒野より, Kōya Yori) is the 38th studio album by Japanese singer-songwriter Miyuki Nakajima, released in November 2011.

The first two tracks on From the Icy Reaches were released as a lead single in October 2011. The title track was featured in the blockbuster TV drama Nankyoku Tairiku starring Takuya Kimura and aired on TBS. Over a half of the song appeared on the album were written for her musical Yakai Vol.17 2/2 played from November to December 2011 —"Wagtail", "He, I, and the Other", "Really Crazy About You", "Give and Take", "Wanderer Comeback to Me" and "Homecoming Crowd".

The album debuted at No. 4 on the Japanese Oricon Weekly chart, one rank higher than its predecessor Midnight Zoo released in 2010.

== Track listing ==
All songs written and composed by Miyuki Nakajima, arranged by Ichizō Seo (except M5 co-arranged by Shingo Kobayashi, and M7 co-arranged by Satoshi Nakamura)

1. "From the Icy Reaches (荒野より, Kōya Yori)" – 5:42
2. "Tapir (バクです, Baku Desu)" – 5:24
3. "Ba-Na-Na" – 4:27
4. "I'll Go to Wherever (あばうとに行きます, Abauto ni Ikimasu)" – 4:30
5. "Wagtail (鶺鴒, Sekirei)" – 5:15
6. "He, I, and the Other (彼と私と、もう1人, Kare to Watashi to, Mō Hitori)" – 5:25
7. "Really Crazy About You (ばりほれとんぜ, Bari Horetonze)" – 4:05
8. "Give and Take (ギヴ・アンド・テイク)" – 5:42
9. "Wanderer, Come Back to Me (旅人よ我に帰れ, Tabibito yo Ware ni Kaere)" – 6:34
10. "Homecoming Crowd (帰郷群, Kikyōgun)" – 5:37
11. "Running on Love (走, Sō)" – 6:07

== Personnel ==
- Miyuki Nakajima – Vocals
- Vinnie Colaiuta – Drums
- Neil Stubenhaus – Electric bass
- Michael Thompson – Electric guitar, acoustic guitar
- Nozomi Furukawa – Electric guitar, acoustic guitar
- Doug Livingston – Pedal steel guitar
- Jon Gilutin – Acoustic piano, electric piano, keyboards, hammond organ
- Jia Peng Fang – Erhu
- Shingo Kobayashi – Acoustic piano, keyboards, synth programming
- Satoshi Nakamura – Saxophone
- Taro Shizuoka – Trombone
- Shuichiro Terao – Trumpet
- Ittetsu Gen – Violin
- Maki Nagata – Violin
- Koji Ohtake – Violin
- Kaoru Kuroki – Violin
- Kenta Kuroki – Violin
- Yoshiko Kaneko – Violin
- Takuya Mori – Violin
- Yuko Kajitani – Violin
- Yayoi Fujita – Violin
- Shiori Takeda – Violin
- Ayako Himata – Violin
- Shoko Miki – Viola
- Daisuke Kadowaki – Viola
- Kaori Morita – Cello
- Toshiyuki Muranaka – Cello
- Tomoki Iwanaga – Cello
- Fumikazu Miyashita – Background vocals
- Ichizo Seo – Background vocals
- Yuiko Tsubokura – Background vocals
- Yasuhiro Kido – Background vocals
- Kazuyo Sugimoto – Background vocals
- Misa Nakayama – Background vocals
- Naoki Takao – Background vocals
- Julia Waters – Background vocals
- Maxine Waters – Background vocals
- Oren Waters – Background vocals
- Luther N. Waters – Background vocals
- Terry Wood – Background vocals
- Terry Young – Background vocals

== Chart positions ==
Chart	Position
Japanese Oricon Weekly Albums Chart (top 300)	4

== Release history ==
Country	Date	Label	Format	Catalog number
Japan	October 13, 2010	Yamaha Music Communications	CD	YCCW-10160
