= Miss M. =

miss M.

Studio album by Miyuki Nakajima
- Released: November 7, 1985
- Recorded: Epicurus Studios
- Genre: Folk rock, arena rock
- Length: 44:54
- Label: Canyon/AARD-VARK
- Producer: Miyuki Nakajima

Miyuki Nakajima chronology
Change (Oiro Naoshi) (1985)	miss M. (1985)	36.5°C (1986)

miss M. is the 13th studio album by Japanese singer-songwriter Miyuki Nakajima, released in November 1985.

== Track listing ==
All songs written and composed by Miyuki Nakajima.

=== Side one ===
All songs arranged by Tsugutoshi Gotō (except "Netsubyou" arranged by Chito Kawauchi)

1. "Gokuraku Dōri e Irasshai (極楽通りへいらっしゃい)" – 3:15
2. "Tomorrow at the Bourbon House (あしたバーボンハウスで, Ashita Bourbon House de)" – 3:39
3. "Fever (熱病, Netsubyou)" – 3:00
4. "Sore Ijou Iwanaide (それ以上言わないで)" – 5:35
5. "Lonely Face (孤独の肖像, Kodoku no Shouzou)" [Album mix] – 5:49

=== Side two ===
All songs arranged by Tsugutoshi Gotō (except "Tsuki no Akanbou" and "Kata ni Furu Ame" arranged by Nobuo Kurata, "Wasurete wa Ikenai" arranged by Chito Kawauchi)

1. "Tsuki no Akanbou (月の赤ん坊)" – 4:13
2. "Wasurete wa Ikenai (忘れてはいけない)" – 5:03
3. "Showtime (ショウ・タイム, Shou Taimu)" – 4:05
4. "Nostalgia (ノスタルジア, Nosutarujia)" – 4:44
5. "Kata ni Furu Ame (肩に降る雨)" – 5:31

== Chart positions ==
Year	Country	Chart	Position	Sales
1985	Japan	Oricon Weekly LP Albums Chart (top 100)	1	237,000
1985	Japan	Oricon Weekly CT Albums Chart (top 100)	2	237,000
1985	Japan	Oricon Weekly CD Albums Chart (top 100)	2	237,000

== See also ==
- 1985 in Japanese music
