= Oiro Naoshi =

Change (Oiro Naoshi)

Studio album by Miyuki Nakajima
- Released: April 17, 1985
- Recorded: Hitokuchizaka and Epicurus Studios (except backing track for "Kamome wa Kamome" recorded at Ishibashi Memorial Hall)
- Genre: Folk rock, kayōkyoku
- Length: 38:09
- Label: Canyon Records/AARD-VARK, Yamaha Music Communications
- Producer: Miyuki Nakajima, Yoshihiro Kai, Tsugutoshi Goto, Nobutaka Tsugei, Kasumasa Yoshizaki

Miyuki Nakajima chronology
'How Do You Do (Hajimemashite)-' (1984)	Change (Oiro Naoshi) (1985)	miss M. (1985)

Change (御色なおし, Oiro Naoshi) is the 12th studio album by Japanese singer-songwriter Miyuki Nakajima. It was released in April 1985. The album comprises nine tracks originally written for other singers, including "Kamome wa Kamome," which is known as one of the signature songs for Naoko Ken, and "Sparrow (Suzume)", which became the sole top-ten charting solo single for ex-Pink Lady member Keiko Masuda.

== Track listing ==
All songs written by Miyuki Nakajima, except the music of "Bibou no Miyako" composed by Kyouhei Tsutsumi

=== Side one ===
No.	Title	Original performer	Length
1.	"Hitoripocchi de Odorasete (ひとりぽっちで踊らせて)" (arranged by Chito Kawauchi)	Naoko Ken	4:48
2.	"Sparrow (すずめ, Suzume)" (arranged by Nobutaka Tsugei)	Keiko Masuda	4:40
3.	"Saiai (最愛)" (arranged by Nobutaka Tsugei)	Yoshie Kashiwabara	4:19
4.	"Farewell Chimes (さよならの鐘, Sayonara no Kane)" (arranged by Michio Yamashita and Crystal King)	Graciela Susana	4:57

=== Side two ===
No.	Title	Original performer	Length
1.	"The Sea and the Jewels (海と宝石, Umi to Houseki)" (Album version, arranged by Nobutaka Tsugei)	Keiko Matsuzaka	2:45
2.	"Camouflage (カム・フラージュ, Kamufuraju)" (arranged by Chito Kawauchi)	Yoshie Kashiwabara	4:12
3.	"Tabako (煙草)" (arranged by Michio Yamashita and Crystal King)	Yuko Kotegawa	3:33
4.	"Bibou no Miyako (美貌の都)" (arranged by Tsugutoshi Goto)	Hiromi Go	4:40
5.	"Kamome wa Kamome (かもめはかもめ)" (arranged by Kuni Kawauchi)	Naoko Ken	4:15

== Personnel ==
=== Kai Band ===
- Yoshihiro Kai – guitars, backing vocals
- Nobukazu Omori – guitars
- Hideo Matsufuji – drums
- Ichiro Tanaka – guitars

=== Sentimental City Romance ===
- Nobutaka Tsugei – E. Guitar, Keyboards, Percussion & Chorus
- Fumio Kondo – drums
- Yutaka Hosoi – keyboards, chorus
- Tokuo Nakano – electric guitar, acoustic guitar, chorus
- Kiyoshi Hisada – electric bass, chorus

=== Crystal King ===
- Katsumasa "Monsieur" Yoshizaki – percussion, chorus
- Masayuki Tanaka – chorus
- Kimiharu Nakamura – piano
- Hiromi Imakiire – keyboards
- Michio Yamashita – electric guitars
- Hidetoshi Nomoto – electric bass
- Kazuyoshi Takagi – drums

=== Additional musicians ===
- Yasuo Tomikura – electric bass
- Tsugutoshi Goto – electric bass, electric guitar
- Haruo Togashi – piano, keyboards
- Elton Nagata – keyboards
- Kuni Kawauchi – pipe organ
- Hideki Matsutake – synthesizer programming
- Shigeo Fuchino – saxophone
- Kiyoshi Saito – saxophone
- Pecker – percussion
- Hideo Yamaki – drums
- Maeda Strings – strings

== Production ==
- Composer, lyricist, Producer and Performer: Miyuki Nakajima (credited in association with Airando)
- Composer for "Bibou no Miyako": Kyohei Tsutsumi
- Arrangers: Chito Kawauchi (on M1,6), Nobutaka Tsugei (on M2,3,5), Michio Yamashita and Crystal King (on M4,7), Tsugutoshi Goto (on M8), Kuni Kawauchi (on M9)
- Recording Director: Yoshio Okujima
- Director: Yuzo Watanabe
- Art Director: Jin Tamura
- Designer: Hirofumi Arai
- Costume Designer: Kazumi Yamase
- Manager: Osamu Tsuchiya
- Executive Producer: Genichi Kawakami
- Special Thanks: Ken Okugawa

Mixed at the TAKE ONE and Epicurus Studios, Tokyo, Japan

== Chart positions ==
Year	Country	Chart	Position	Sales
1985	Japan	Oricon Weekly LP Albums Chart (top 100)	1	338,000
1985	Japan	Oricon Weekly CT Albums Chart (top 100)	1	338,000

== Release history ==
Country	Date	Label	Format	Catalog number
Japan	April 17, 1985	Audio cassette	Pony	28P-6416
Japan	April 17, 1985	Canyon Records	LP	C25A-0404
Japan	April 21, 1985	Canyon Records	CD	D32A-0073
Japan	March 1, 1985	Canyon Records	LP	C32A-0406
Japan	March 21, 1989	Pony Canyon	CD	D35A-0464
Japan	May 21, 1990	Pony Canyon	CD	PCCA-00081
Japan	April 18, 2001	Yamaha Music Communications	CD	YCCW-00015
Japan	October 1, 2008	Yamaha Music Communications	CD	YCCW-10064

== See also ==
- 1985 in Japanese music
