= Kaikinetsu =

Studio album by Miyuki Nakajima
- Released: November 15, 1989
- Recorded: Burnish Stone, Epicurus, Music Inn, Sound Valley (Tokyo, Japan)
- Genre: folk rock, pop, kayokyoku
- Length: 48:30
- Language: Japanese
- Label: Pony Canyon/AARD-VARK, Yamaha Music Communications
- Producer: Ichizō Seo, Miyuki Nakajima

Miyuki Nakajima chronology
| Goodbye Girl (1988) | Kaikinetsu (1989) | Yoru wo Yuke (1990) |

Kaikinetsu (回帰熱, "Recurrent Fever") is the 17th studio album by Japanese singer-songwriter Miyuki Nakajima, released in November 1989. Like some of her previous efforts (Okaerinasai and Oiro Naoshi), it comprises the materials that she wrote for other singers.

The album features three top-ten hit singles. Among them, "Haru Nanoni" was recorded by pop idol Yoshie Kashiwabara in 1983. It became Kashiwabara's most successful single after her breakthrough "Hello Goodbye", peaking at No. 6 on the Japanese Oricon chart. Nakajima's contribution won the 25th Japan Record Awards for the "Best Songwriting Prize". "Lonely Canary" is one of Kashiwabara's subsequent materials written by Nakajima, released in 1985 and charted at No. 9. The lead-off track, "Kōsa ni Fukarete," was recorded by Shizuka Kudō and released as a single 2 months before Kaikinetsu came out. Nakajima had previously contributed the lyrics for her records, including two chart toppers "Fu-Ji-Tsu" and "Mu-Go,n...Iroppoi". "Kōsa ni Fukarete" also reached the summit of the Oricon shortly after its release, becoming the fifth of Kudo's eight consecutive No. 1 hit singles. In Japan, it became one of the biggest hits of 1989 with sales of over 580,000 copies, winning the 4th RIAJ Gold Disc Awards for "The Best Five Singles of Year" category.

Following the smash hit single interpreted by Kudo, Kaikinetsu sold better than other Nakajima's albums released in the late 1980s. On the Japanese Oricon Year-end chart of 1990, it was placed at the 99th best-selling album.

== Track listing ==
All songs arranged by Ichizō Seo

| No. | Title | Writer(s) | Original performer (release year) | Length |
|---|---|---|---|---|
| 1. | "Kōsa ni Fukarete (黄砂に吹かれて)" | Miyuki Nakajima, Tsugutoshi Gotō | Shizuka Kudō (1989) | 5:51 |
| 2. | "Katahaba no Mirai (肩幅の未来)" | Nakajima, Kyōhei Tsutsumi | Yōko Nagayama (1989) | 5:18 |
| 3. | "Ari, ka (あり、か)" | Nakajima | Ichiro Tanaka and Yoshihiro Kai (1988) | 5:45 |
| 4. | "Gunshū (群衆)" | Nakajima, Goto | Shizuka Kudo (1988) | 5:46 |
| 5. | "Lonely Canary (ロンリー・カナリア, Ronrī Kanaria)" | Nakajima | Yoshie Kashiwabara (1985) | 5:01 |
| 6. | "Kurayami Otome (くらやみ乙女)" | Nakajima | Reiko Sada (1989) | 4:45 |
| 7. | "Ceremony (儀式 (セレモニー), Seremonī)" | Nakajima | Noriko Matsumoto (1986) | 4:46 |
| 8. | "Mikansei (未完成)" | Nakajima | Hiroko Yakushimaru (1987) | 6:15 |
| 9. | "Even in the Spring (春なのに, Haru Nanoni)" | Nakajima | Yoshie Kashiwabara (1983) | 5:04 |

== Personnel ==
- Hideo Yamaki – drums
- Eiji Shimamura – drums
- Jun Aoyama – drums
- Yūichi Tokashiki – drums
- Chiharu Mikuzuki – bass guitar
- Kenji Takamizu – bass guitar
- Tsugutoshi Goto – bass guitar
- Yasuo Arakawa – wood bass
- Tsuyoshi Kon – electric guitar
- Masaki Matsubara – electric guitar
- Hideo Saito – electric guitar
- Ryōmei Shirai – electric guitar
- Kiyoshi Sugimoto – electric guitar
- Chuei Yoshikawa – acoustic guitar, flat mandolin
- Nobuo Kurata – keyboards
- Yasuharu Nakanishi – keyboards
- Ken Shima – keyboards
- Elton Nagata – keyboards
- Hideo Ichikawa – keyboards
- Yasuhiro Kobayashi – accordion
- Aska Group – strings
- Joe Group – strings
- Sakurako Shirahama – violin
- Kouzou Noguchi – bassoon
- Masashi Togame – clarinet
- Toshihiko Furumura – alto sax
- Nobuhiko Nakayama – computer programming
- Tatsuhiko Mori – computer programming
- Keishi Urata – computer programming
- Yuiko Tsubokura – backing vocals
- Kazuyo Sugimoto – backing vocals
- Ichizō Seo – backing vocals, keyboards, computer programming
- Miyuki Nakajima – lead and backing vocals

== Chart positions ==
| Chart (1989–90) | Position | Sales |
|---|---|---|
| Japanese Oricon Weekly Albums Chart (top 100) | 2 | 210,000+ |

== See also ==
- 1989 in Japanese music
