= Ringetsu =

Month of Parturition (Ringetsu)

Studio album by Miyuki Nakajima
- Released: March 5, 1981
- Recorded: Epicurus Studio, Hitokuchizaka Studio, Media Studio
- Genre: J-pop (folk, kayokyoku)
- Length: 45:29
- Label: Canyon/AARD-VARK
- Producer: Miyuki Nakajima

Miyuki Nakajima chronology
Ikiteitemo Iidesuka (1980)	Month of Parturition (Ringetsu) (1981)	Kansuigyo (1982)

Singles from Month of Parturition (Ringetsu)
- 1. "Hitori Jouzu" Released: October 21, 1980; 2. "Ashita Tenki ni Nare" Released: March 21, 1981

Month of Parturition (臨月, Ringetsu) is the eighth studio album by Japanese singer-songwriter Miyuki Nakajima, released in March 1981.

The album features "Hitori Jouzu", a song released as a lead single in October 1980 and became her second top-ten hit on the Japanese Oricon (since her 1977 chart-topper "The Parting Song").

Month of Parturition topped the Japanese albums chart for two weeks, and marked the number-six on the country's year-end chart of 1981. Also in December 1981, the album received honor of winning the 23rd Japan Record Awards for "Album Best 10", a category acclaimed the ten most magnificent long-playing records.

Along with a follow-up Kansuigyo released in the following year, Month of Parturition has been one of her best-selling non-compilation albums to date, selling over 590,000 copies.

== Track listing ==
All songs written and composed by Miyuki Nakajima.

=== Side one ===
1. "Ashita Tenki ni Nare (あした天気になれ)" – 3:19
2. "Anata ga Umi wo Miteiru Uchi ni (あなたが海を見ているうちに)" – 5:42
3. "Self Portrait in Two Mirrors (あわせ鏡, Awase Kagami)" – 5:13
4. "Hitori Jouzu (ひとり上手( lit., Having Been Accustomed to Solitude))" – 4:12
5. "Snow (雪, Yuki)" – 4:55

=== Side two ===
1. "Bus Dōri (バス通り, Basu Dōri)" – 4:18
2. "Friendship (友情, Yūjou)" – 6:56
3. "Seijin Sedai (成人世代)" – 4:06
4. "Nocturne (夜曲, Yakyoku)" – 6:48

== Personnel ==
- Miyuki Nakajima – Vocals
- Masaki Matsubara – electric guitar
- Takashi Ozaki – electric guitar
- Ken Yashima – electric guitar
- Shigeru Suzuki – electric guitar
- Kazuo Shiina – electric guitar
- Chuei Yoshikawa – acoustic guitar
- Hiromi Yasuda – acoustic guitar
- Tsugutoshi Goto – bass guitar
- Michio Nagaoka – bass guitar
- Kenji Takamizu – bass guitar
- Ryoichi Akimoto – bass guitar
- Masataka Matsutoya – keyboards
- Haruo Togashi – keyboards
- Yasuharu Nakanishi – keyboards
- Maki Tashiro – keyboards
- Izumi Kobayashi – keyboards
- Nobu Saito – percussion
- Motoya Hamaguchi – percussion
- Yuki Sugawara – percussion
- Nobuo Yagi – harmonica
- Keiko Yamakawa – harp
- Jake H Conception – saxophone
- Eiji Shimamura – drums
- Yuichi Tokashiki – drums
- Tatsuo Hayashi – drums
- Yutaka Uehara – drums

== Production ==
- Performer, composer, lyricist, producer: Miyuki Nakajima
- Arranger: Katz Hoshi (Side one #1 / Side two #3), Hiromi Yasuda (Side one #2), Masataka Matsutoya (Side one No. 3 / Side two #2,4), Mitsuo Hagita (Side one #4,5 / Side two #1)
- Recording director: Yoshio Okujima
- Director: YūZō Watanabe
- Mixing and mastering engineer: Katsuya Kuroda
- Assistant engineer: Bill Takahashi
- Photographer, art director: Jin Tamura
- Designer: Hirofumi Arai
- Management for the artist: Hiroshi Kojima, Kunio Kaneko
- Executive producer: Genichi Kawakami
  - Special Thanks to Gil House People
  - Mixed and Mastered at the Hitokuchizaka SIudio, Tokyo, Japan

== Awards ==
Japan Record Awards
Year	Title	Category	Winner
1981 (23rd)	Month of Parturition (Ringetsu)	Best 10 Albums	Miyuki Nakajima

== Chart positions ==
=== Album ===
Year	Album	Country	Chart	Position	Sales
1981	Month of Parturition (Ringetsu)	Japan	Oricon Weekly LP Albums Chart (top 100)	1	590,000
1981	Month of Parturition (Ringetsu)	Japan	Oricon Weekly CT Albums Chart (top 100)	1	590,000

=== Singles ===
Year	Single	B-Side	Chart	Position	Sales
1980	"Hitori Jouzu"	"Kanashimi ni"	Japanese Oricon Weekly (top 100)	6	444,000
1981	"Ashita Tenki ni Nare"	"Anzu Mura kara"	Japanese Oricon Weekly (top 100)	25	79,000

== See also ==
- 1981 in Japanese music
