= Lullaby Singer =

Studio album by Miyuki Nakajima
- Released: November 22, 2006
- Recorded: 2006, at the Ocean Way Recording (Los Angeles, U.S.) and Epicurus Studios (Tokyo, Japan)
- Genre: Folk rock
- Length: 59:54
- Label: Yamaha Music Communications
- Producer: Ichizo Seo, Miyuki Nakajima

Miyuki Nakajima chronology
Ten-Sei (2005)	Lullaby Singer (2006)	I Love You, Do You Hear Me? (2007)

Lullaby Singer (ララバイSINGER ララバイシンガー, Rarabai Shingā) is the 34th studio album by Japanese singer-songwriter Miyuki Nakajima, released in November 2006.

The album comprises 12 tracks, and 4 of them were initially composed for other artists, such as "A Key" for Shizuka Kudo and "Only for the Sake of Love" for Hiromi Iwasaki. "Say Goodbye to That Goodbye", a song originally recorded by Tomomi Kahala, became the final release for her who has semi-retired since 2007. The most well-known is "Ship in the Air" interpreted by boy band Tokio. Their recording was featured as the closing theme for My Boss, My Hero, a television drama remake of Korean motion picture and starring Tomoya Nagase, a lead vocalist of the band. It was released as a single in August 2007 and debuted at the number-one on the Japanese Oricon weekly singles chart with more than 120,000 copies sold. A song remained on the country's hit parade for about a year, finally becoming one of the biggest hit singles for the group.

In December 2006, her successful contribution for Tokio was acclaimed by the Japan Composer's Association, winning the 48th Japan Record Award for "Best Lyrics".

Because "Ship in the Air" by Tokio became massive hit, Lullaby Singer also gained relatively moderate commercial success with the sales of 117,000 copies, despite it managed to enter the top-10 on the Oricon albums chart.

== Track listing ==
All songs written and composed by Miyuki Nakajima, arranged by Ichizo Seo (except M1/10 co-arranged by Nakajima, M7/11 co-arranged by Satoshi Nakamura, and M8/12 co-arranged by Nakajima and Ittetsu Gen)

1. "Sakura La La La La (桜らららら, Sakurarararara)" – 2:24
2. "Only for the Sake of Love (ただ・愛のためにだけ, Tada Ai no Tame ni Dake)" – 5:19
3. "Ship in the Air (宙船, Sorafune)" – 4:19
4. "Say Goodbye to That Goodbye (あのさよならにさよならを, Ano Sayonara ni Sayonara wo)" – 4:56
5. "A Key (Clävis ～鍵～, Kuravisu -Kagi-)" – 5:37
6. "Water (水, Mizu)" – 4:56
7. "It Has to Be You (あなたでなければ, Anata de Nakereba)" – 4:56
8. "In the May Sunshine (5月の陽ざし, Gogatsu no Hizashi)" – 5:58
9. "Too Slow! (とろ, Toro)" – 4:11
10. "Wishing for the Moon (お月さまほしい, Otsukisama Hoshii)" – 4:54
11. "Shouldering a Heavy Load (重き荷を負いて, Omoki Ni wo Oite)" – 7:02
12. "A Lullaby Singer (ララバイSINGER ララバイシンガー, Rarabai Shingā)" – 5:22

== Personnel ==
- Miyuki Nakajima – vocals, acoustic guitar
- Ichizo Seo – keyboards, background vocals
- Vinnie Colaiuta – drums
- Gregg Bissonette – drums
- Joey Waronker – drums
- Denny Fongheiser – drums
- Nozomi Furukawa – electric guitar, nylon strings guitar, bouzouki
- Masayoshi Furukawa – electric guitar, acoustic guitar
- Michael Thompson – electric guitar, acoustic guitar
- Chuei Yoshikawa – acoustic guitar, 12 string guitar
- Neil Stubenhaus – electric bass
- Shingo Kobayashi – acoustic piano, keyboards, hammond organ, computer programming, background vocals
- Jon Gilutin – acoustic piano, electric piano, keyboards, strings pad, hammond organ
- Keishi Urata – computer programming
- Chikanari Gokan – computer programming
- Ittetsu Gen – violin
- Takao Ochiai – violin
- Daisuke Kadowaki – violin
- Yoshiko Kaneko – violin
- Yayoi Fujita – violin
- Maki Nagata – violin
- Takuya Mori – violin
- Kaoru Kuroki – violin
- Yuko Kajitani – violin
- Jun Takeuchi – violin
- Crusher Kimura – violin, viola
- Shoko Miki – viola
- Kaori Morita – cello
- Tomoki Iwanaga – cello
- Kazuki Chiba – contrabass
- Yoshinobu Takeshita – contrabass
- Satoshi Nakamura – saxophone
- Taro Kiyooka – trombone
- Isao Sakuma – trumpet
- Fumikazu Miyashita – backing vocals
- Kazuyo Sugimoto – backing vocals
- Yuiko Tsubokura – backing vocals
- Julia Waters – backing vocals
- Maxine Waters – backing vocals
- Oren Waters – backing vocals
- Etsuro Wakakonai – backing vocals
- Yasuhiro Kido – backing vocals
- Hidekazu Utsumi – backing vocals
- Katsumi Maeda – backing vocals
- Kiyoshi Hiyama – backing vocals

== Production ==
- Producer, arranger: Ichizo Seo
- Lyricist, composer, arranger, performer, co-arranger and co-producer: Miyuki Nakajima
- Recording and mixing engineer: David Thoener
- Additional recording engineer: Kengo Kato
- Assistant mixing engineer: Wesley Seidman (at the Ocean Way Recording, Los Angeles)
- Assistant mixing and recording engineer: Shuichiro Terao (at the Epicurus Studios, Tokyo)
- Mastering Engineer: Tom Baker (at the Precision Mastering, Los Angeles)
- Production director: Kentaro Fukushima
- A&R director: Ryo Yoneya
- Recording coordinators: Fumio Miyata, Tomoo Sato, Tomoko Takaya, Ruriko Duer
- Interpreter:Masako Kawahara
- Lyrics translator:Jonathan Katz, Hiroyuki Murakami
- Costume coordinator: Shikiji Hazama
- Photographer: Jin Tamura
- Artwork designer: Hirofumi Arai
- Hair, make-up artist: Noriko Izumisawa
- Artist managers: Koji Suzuki, Koichi Okazaki
- Assistant manager: Fumie Ohshima
- General affairs: Aya Ninomiya
- Disc promoters: Hisahiro Ando, Tatsuro Yamashita
- General producer: Takumi Shimizu
- DAD: Genichi Kawakami

== Chart position ==
Chart	Position	Sales
Japanese Oricon Weekly Albums Chart (top 300)	10	117,000+

== Release history ==
Country	Date	Label	Format	Catalog number
Japan	November 22, 2006	Yamaha Music Communications	CD	YCCW-10030
Japan	December 3, 2008	Yamaha Music Communications	CD	YCCW-10086
