= Musical Suite =

Studio album by Miyuki Nakajima
- Released: 2015

Miyuki Nakajima chronology
Hard Problems (2014)	Musical Suite (2015)

Musical Suite (組曲 (Suite), Kumikyoku (Suīto)) is the 41st studio album by Japanese singer-songwriter Miyuki Nakajima, released in November 2015.

== Track listing ==
All songs written and composed by Miyuki Nakajima and arranged by Ichizo Seo.

1. "36 Hours (36時間, 36-jikan)" – 5:25
2. "Love Letter of Unconveyed Love (愛と云わないラヴレター, Ai to iwanai ravuretā)" – 4:40
3. "Leica M4 (ライカM4, Raika M4)" – 6:11
4. "Ice Flower (氷中花, Hyōchūka)"" – 6:17
5. "The Sound of Sleet (霙の音, Mizore no oto)" – 5:10
6. "As Long As the Sky Exists (空がある限り, Sora ga aru kagiri)" – 7:40
7. "The Rain Once More (月夜同舟, Mōichido ame ga)" – 4:51
8. "Why & No" – 4:16
9. "Resting Stone (休石, Yasumiishi)" – 5:01
10. "LADY JANE" – 6:18

== Personnel ==
- Miyuki Nakajima – Lead vocals
