= Midnight Zoo (album) =

Studio album by Miyuki Nakajima
- Released: October 13, 2010
- Recorded: 2010, at the Conway Recording Studios (Los Angeles, U.S.) and Bunkamura and momos Studios (Tokyo, Japan)
- Genre: Folk rock
- Length: 66:42
- Language: Japanese
- Label: Yamaha Music Communications
- Producer: Ichizo Seo, Miyuki Nakajima

Miyuki Nakajima chronology
Drama! (2009)	Midnight Zoo (2010)	From the Icy Reaches (2011)

Midnight Zoo (真夜中の動物園, Mayonaka no Dōbutsuen) is the 37th studio album by Japanese singer-songwriter Miyuki Nakajima, released in October 2010.

None of the songs appeared on the album was released as a single. Instead, two of previous released materials were featured as bonus tracks; her own interpretation of the song "Snow Umbrella" originally recorded by Shizuka Kudo in 2008, and new recording of her recent single "Just Save Love" released in 2009. The song "It's a Dream" was simultaneously covered by Makichang (then-23-year-old female singer-songwriter who've contracted with Nakajima's management office). Her version was released as a double A-Side single with her original composition "Anata no Inai Heya ni Nareru Hi ga Kuru Made" by VAP Records.

Midnight Zoo debuted at No. 5 on the Japanese Oricon Weekly albums chart, making Nakajima the first female solo artist to have had the country's top-10 charting albums in five consecutive decades – three male musicians have already set this record; Eric Clapton, Eikichi Yazawa and Masashi Sada. The album has sold over 40,000 copies as of December 2010.

== Track listing ==
All songs written and composed by Miyuki Nakajima, arranged by Ichizo Seo (except M1/10 co-arranged by Satoshi Nakamura, and M11 co-arranged by Shingo Kobayashi)

1. "From This Day On (今日以来, Kyō Irai)" – 5:09
2. "Midnight Zoo (真夜中の動物園, Mayonaka no Dōbutsuen)" – 7:13
3. "We are All Rapidly Passing Each Other (まるで高速電車のようにあたしたちは擦れ違う, Maru de Kōsoku-Densha no You ni Atashitachi wa Surechigau)" – 4:26
4. "Even Hedgehogs Fall in Love (ハリネズミだって恋をする, Harinezumi Datte Koi wo Suru)" – 4:19
5. "For the Small Wounded (小さき負傷者たちのために, Chiisaki Fushōsha Tachi no Tame ni)" – 6:51
6. "It's a Dream (夢だもの, Yume Damono)" – 5:26
7. "A Shark's Song (サメの歌, Same no Uta)" – 4:11
8. "An Anchovy Gnashing Its Teeth (ごまめの歯ぎしり, Gomame no Hagishiri)" – 4:28
9. "The Falcon's Song (鷹の歌, Taka no Uta)" – 6:13
10. "Makenmon-ne (I Can't Lose) (負けんもんね, Makenmonne)" – 5:42

Bonus tracks

11. "Snow Umbrella (雪傘, Yukigasa)" – 6:00
12. "Just Save Love (愛だけを残せ, Ai Dake wo Nokose)" (album version) – 6:26

== Personnel ==
- Miyuki Nakajima – Lead and background vocals
- Kenny Aronoff – Drums
- Vinnie Colaiuta – Drums
- Neil Stubenhaus – Electric bass
- Michael Landau – Electric guitar, acoustic guitar
- Michael Thompson – Electric guitar, acoustic guitar, flat mandolin
- Dean Parks – Acoustic guitar
- Nozomi Furukawa – Electric guitar
- Jon Gilutin – Acoustic piano, electric piano, keyboards, hammond organ
- Shingo Kobayashi – Acoustic piano, keyboards, synth programming
- Mataro Misawa – Percussion
- Shuichiro Terao – Percussion loop
- Shigeo Fuchino – Saxophone
- Satoshi Nakamura – Saxophone
- Taro Shizuoka – Trombone
- Shiro Sasaki – Trumpet
- Ittetsu Gen – Violin
- Maki Nagata – Violin
- Daisuke Kadowaki – Violin
- Crusher Kimura – Violin
- Takao Ochiai – Violin
- Nobuko Kaiwa – Violin
- Kaoru Kuroki – Violin
- Kenta Kuroki – Violin
- Yoshiko Kaneko – Violin
- Choi Song-il – Violin
- Naoko Ishibashi – Violin
- Makiko Murakoshi – Violin
- Yuichi Endo – Violin
- Hiroki Muto – Violin
- Izumiko Fujiie – Violin
- Soki Nagaoka – Violin
- Rei Yokomizo – Violin
- Kyoko Ishigame – Violin
- Asako Sugano – Violin
- Takayuki Oshikane – Violin
- Yoko Fujinawa – Violin
- Takuya Mori – Viola
- Shoko Miki – Viola
- Kaori Morita – Cello
- Tomoki Iwanaga – Cello
- Ichizo Seo – Background vocals
- Fumikazu Miyashita – Background vocals
- Yuiko Tsubokura – Background vocals
- Kazuyo Sugimoto – Background vocals
- Julia Waters – Background vocals
- Maxine Waters – Background vocals
- Oren Waters – Background vocals

== Chart positions ==
Chart	Position
Japanese Oricon Weekly Albums Chart (top 300)	5

== Release history ==
Country	Date	Label	Format	Catalog number
Japan	October 13, 2010	Yamaha Music Communications	CD	YCCW-10121
