= 10 Wings =

Studio album by Miyuki Nakajima
- Released: October 20, 1995
- Recorded: Old AIR Azabu Studio, Burnish Stone, Z'd, Sound Inn, ARC Garret, Capitol Studios, Sony Scoring Stage, One On One Recording and The Enterprise
- Genre: Progressive rock
- Length: 71:30
- Label: Pony Canyon/AARD-VARK, Yamaha Music Communications
- Producer: Ichizo Seo, Miyuki Nakajima

Miyuki Nakajima chronology
Love or Nothing (1994)	10 Wings (1995)	Paradise Cafe (1996)

10 Wings is the album by Japanese singer-songwriter Miyuki Nakajima, released in October 1995.

The album consists of new studio recordings of the songs which she wrote for annual experimental theatres entitled Yakai (夜会), premiered in November 1989. Some songs already appeared on her previous studio albums released in the 1990s. They were newly recorded with the different interpretations for the album. One of them, remake version of "Two of Us" features Masanori Sera, a frontman of the Twist, on lead vocals. The lead-off track "Two Boats" was used in the 1996 film Kiri no Shigosen.

Lengthy arrangements of all the songs featured on the album are thoroughly altered from its original versions. After release of 10 Wings, Nakajima has released several similar concept albums to date; Hi -Wings- and Tsuki -Wings (1999), and Ten-Sei (2005).

== Track listing ==
All songs written by Miyuki Nakajima, arranged by Ichizō Seo (except "Diamond Cage" co-arranged by Keishi Urata, "Two of Us" and "You Who Will Stay to Live Forever" arranged by David Campbell)

1. "Two Boats (二隻の舟, Nisou no Fune)" [new recording] – 8:20
  a theme song of "Yakai", first performed on the premier in 1989
2. "Make You Remember (思い出させてあげる, Omoidasasete Ageru)" – 7:50
  a song performed on "Yakai Vol.6 Shangri-La" (1994)
3. "Don't Cry, Amaterasu (泣かないでアマテラス, Nakanaide Amaterasu)" – 7:21
  from "Yakai Vol.4 Kinkanshoku" (1992)
4. "Maybe" [new recording] – 6:51
  from "Yakai 1990"
5. "Two of Us (ふたりは, Futari wa)" [new recording] – 9:05
  from "Yakai 1990"
6. "Diamond Cage" – 7:10
  from "Yakai Vol.4 Kinkanshoku" (1992)
7. "I Love Him" – 5:45
  from "Yakai Vol.3 Kan-Tan" (1991)
8. "Cradle Song (子守歌, Komoriuta)" – 4:15
  from "Yakai Vol.6 Shangri-La" (1994)
9. "You Who Will Stay to Live Forever (生きてゆくおまえ, Ikiteyuku Omae)" – 10:54
  from "Yakai Vol.6 Shangri-La" (1994)
10. "Song of Waiting for Someone (人待ち歌, Hito Machi Uta)" – 5:00
  from "Yakai Vol.5 Hana no Iro wa Utsuri ni keri na Itazura ni Waga Mi Yo ni Furu Nagame seshi ma ni" (1993)

== Personnel ==
- Miyuki Nakajima – vocals
- Tsuyoshi Kon – electric guitar
- Takahiko Ishikawa – gut guitar
- Bob Glaub – electric bass
- Neil Stubenhaus – electric bass
- Chiharu Mikuzuki – electric and stick bass
- Curt Bisquera – drums
- Hideo Yamaki – drums
- John Guerin – drums
- Jun Aoyama – drums
- Toru Shigemi – keyboards
- Jon Gilutin – acoustic piano
- Shingo Kobayashi – acoustic piano, keyboards, jai winding
- Yasuharu Nakanishi- acoustic piano, keyboards, and programming (drums, percussion & bass)
- Keishi Urata – programming (drums, percussion & bass)
- Toshihiko Furumura- alto sax
- David Campbell – strings conductor
- Ichizo Seo – strings conductor
- Suzie Katayama – strings contractor
- Sid Page – strings concertmaster
- Masatsugu Shinozaki – electric violin
- Masatsugu Shinozaki Group – strings
- Takashi Asahi – tin whistle
- Morinoki Jidou Gasshoudan – chorus on "Two of Us"
- Masanori Sera – guest vocal on "Two of Us"
- Julia Waters – background vocals
- Maxine Waters – background vocals
- Mona Lisa Young – background vocals
- Carmen Twillie – background vocals
- Billie Barnum – background vocals
- Luther Waters – background vocals
- Oren Waters – background vocals
- Terry Wood – background vocals

== Charts ==
=== Weekly charts ===
Chart (1995)	Position
Japanese Oricon Albums Chart	8
Japanese Oricon Albums Chart	20 †

†: Limited edition issued on APO-CD

=== Year-end charts ===
Chart (1995)	Position
Japanese Albums Chart	141

=== Certifications ===
Region	Certification	Certified units/sales
Japan (RIAJ)	Gold	219,000
