= Arigatō (Miyuki Nakajima album) =

A Ri Ga To U

Studio album by Miyuki Nakajima
- Released: June 25, 1977
- Recorded: Epicurus and the Hit Studios, Tokyo, Japan
- Genre: Folk
- Length: 43:10
- Label: AARD-VARK/Canyon, Yamaha Music Communications
- Producer: Genichi Kawakami

Miyuki Nakajima chronology
Minna Itte Shimatta (1976)	A Ri Ga To U (1977)	Aishiteiru to Ittekure (1978)

A Ri Ga To U (あ・り・が・と・う) is the third studio album by Japanese singer-songwriter Miyuki Nakajima, released in June 1977. The album features "On the Platform", a song later released as B-side of her breakthrough single "The Parting Song (Wakareuta)" .

== Track listing ==
All songs written and composed by Miyuki Nakajima.

=== Side one ===
All tracks arranged by Shun Fukui and Kinji Yoshino (except for arrangement of "Henro" by Yoshino, "Matsuribayashi" by Fukui)

1. "Henro (遍路)" - 5:03
2. "Mise no Na wa Life (店の名はライフ, Mise no Na wa Raifu)" - 5:47
3. "Matsuribayashi (まつりばやし)" - 4:02
4. "On'na Nante Mono ni (女なんてものに)" - 5:13

=== Side two ===
All tracks arranged by Shun Fukui and Kinji Yoshino (except for arrangement of "Katte ni Shiyagare" and "Toki wa Nagarete" by Yoshino, "On the Platform" by Fukui)

1. "Asayake (朝焼け)" - 3:42
2. "On the Platform (ホームにて, Hōmu Nite)" - 4:50
3. "Katte ni Shiyagare (勝手にしやがれ)" - 3:02
4. "Searchlight (サーチライト, Sāchiraito)" - 4:24
5. "Toki wa Nagarete (時は流れて)" - 7:07

== Personnel ==
- Miyuki Nakajima - vocal, acoustic guitar
- Ryuichi Sakamoto - keyboards
- Ken Yoshida - bass guitar
- Kiyoshi Sugimoto - guitars
- Masao Komatsuzaki - drums
- Shinji Hagiwara - drums
- Naomi Kawahara - drums
- Teruo Sato - drums
- Masaki Nomura - drums

== Production ==
- Recording director; Yoshio Okushima
- Assistant engineer; Koji Sakakibara
- Manager; Kunio Kaneko
- Director; Yūzō Watanabe
- Cover designer; Natsuo Ueda
- Photographer; Jin Tamura
- Executive producer; Genichi Kawakami

== Chart position ==
Year	Country	Chart	Position	Weeks	Sales
1977	Japan	Oricon Weekly LP Albums Chart (top 100)	6	54	210,000+
1977	Japan	Oricon Weekly CT Albums Chart (top 100)	39	3	210,000+

== See also ==
- 1977 in Japanese music
