= Paradise Cafe =

Studio album by Miyuki Nakajima
- Released: October 18, 1996
- Recorded: Ocean Way, Encore, Woodstock Karuizawa, and Burnish Stone
- Genre: Folk rock, pop
- Length: 57:20
- Label: Pony Canyon/AARD-VARK
- Producer: Ichizo Seo, Miyuki Nakajima

Miyuki Nakajima chronology
Daiginjō (1996)	Paradise Cafe (1996)	Be Like My Child (Watashi no Kodomo ni Narinasai) (1998)

Paradise Cafe (パラダイス・カフェ, Paradaisu Kafe) is the 23rd studio album by Japanese singer-songwriter Miyuki Nakajima, released in October 1996. The album includes a new recording of her 1995 chart-topping hit "Wanderer's Song", and also features her own interpretation of "Lie to Me Eternally", which was originally written for the Long Time No See album recorded by Takuro Yoshida.

Following the massive success of the single "Wanderer's Song", which sold over 1 million units, Paradise Cafe immediately gained an RIAJ a platinum award for shipments of over 400,000 copies. However, the album itself apparently sold beneath expectations, staying briefly on the charts and selling approximately 200,000 units in total.

== Track listing ==
- All songs written and composed by Miyuki Nakajima.
1. "Wanderer's Song (旅人のうた, Tabibito no Uta)" [2nd ver.] – 5:02
2. "Legend (伝説, Densetsu)" – 4:45
3. "Lie to Me Eternally (永遠の嘘をついてくれ, Eien no Uso wo Tsuitekure)" – 6:00
4. "Leave Me Alone, Please" – 5:10
5. "This is Not Love (それは愛ではない, Sore wa Ai dewa Nai)" – 4:15
6. "Untamed Cat (なつかない猫, Natsukanai Neko)" – 4:42
7. "Singles Bar" – 5:54
8. "Blue Generation (蒼い時代, Aoi Jidai)" – 3:47
9. "It's Only Love (たかが愛, Takaga Ai)" – 5:45
10. "Under the Screw Pine Tree (阿檀の木の下で, Adan no Ki no Shita de)" – 6:39
11. "Paradise Cafe " – 5:21

== Personnel ==
- Miyuki Nakajima – vocals
- Ichizo Seo – keyboards, computer programming
- Russ Kunkel – drums
- Gregg Bissonette – drums
- Atsuo Okubo- drums
- Michael Thompson – electric guitar, slide guitar
- Dean Parks – electric and acoustic guitar
- Tsuyoshi Kon – electric guitar
- Nozomi Furukawa – electric guitar
- Shuji Nakamura – gut guitar, 12 string acoustic guitar
- Neil Stubenhaus – electric bass
- Abraham Laboriel – electric bass
- Chiharu Mikuzuki – electric bass
- Chuck Domanico – upright bass
- Keishi Urata – computer programming
- Nobuhiko Nakayama – computer programming
- Manabu Ogasawara – computer programming
- Jon Giltin – acoustic piano, keyboards, hammond organ
- Yasuharu Nakanishi – keyboards, synth bass, acoustic piano
- Elton Nagata – keyboards
- Toshihiko Furumura – alto sax, tenor sax
- Julia Waters – background vocals
- Maxine Waters – background vocals
- Oren Waters – background vocals
- Walfredo Reyes Jr – percussion
- Nobu Saito – percussion

=== Additional personnel ===
- Kiyoshi Hiyama – Background Vocals
- Yasuhiro Kido- Background Vocals
- Motoyoshi Iwasaki – Background Vocals
- Keiko Yamada – Background Vocals
- Mai Yamane – Background Vocals
- Akira Yamane – Background Vocals
- David Campbell – Strings Arrangement and Conduct
- Suzie Katayama – String Contractor
- Sid Page – Concertmaster
- Ryoichi Fujimori – Cello

== Production ==
- Composer, writer, Producer and Performer: Miyuki Nakajima
- Producer and Arranger: Ichizo Seo
- Arranger: David Campbell
- Recording Engineer and Mixer: David Thoener, Tad Gotoh
- Additional Engineer: Wyn Davis, Takanobu Ichikawa, Yuta Uematsu, Chizuru Yamada
- Assistant Engineer: Jennifer Monner, Jeff DeMorris, Milton Chan, Hideki Odera, Kensuke Miura, Yukiho Wada
- Mixer: Joe Chiccarelli
- Assistant Mixer: Chadd Munsey, Hiroshi Tokunaga
- Digital Edit: Rieko Shimoji
- A & R: Kohichi Suzuki
- Production Supervisor: Michio Suzuki
- Assistant for Producer: Tomoo Satoh
- Music Coordinater: Ruriko Sakumi Duer, Kohji Kimura, Fumio Miyata, Tomoko Takaya
- Photographer: Jin Tamura, Jeffrey Bender
- Designer: Hirofumi Arai
- Costume Coordination: Takeshi Hazama
- Hair & Make-Up: Noriko Izumisawa
- Location Coordinator: Chikako DeZonia, Dean Ichiyanagi
- Artist Management: Kohji Suzuki, Kohichi Okazaki
- Management Desk: Atsuko Hayashi
- Artist Promotion: Yoshio Kan
- Disc Promotion: Tsukihiko Yoshida, Shoko Sone
- Sales Promotor: Ikuko Ishigame
- General Management: Takahiro Uno
- DAD: Genichi Kawakami
- Mastering: Tom Baker at Future Disc Systems

== Charts ==
=== Weekly charts ===
Chart (1996)	Position
Japanese Oricon Albums Chart	7
Japanese Oricon Albums Chart	20 †

†: Limited edition issued on APO-CD

=== Year-end charts ===
Chart (1996)	Position
Japanese Albums Chart	167

=== Certifications ===
Region	Certification	Certified units/sales
Japan (RIAJ)	Platinum	207,000
