= Night-Light (Miyuki Nakajima album) =

Studio album by Miyuki Nakajima
- Released: 2012

Miyuki Nakajima chronology
From the Icy Reaches (2011)	Night-Light (2012)	Hard Problems (2014)

Night-Light (常夜灯, Jōyatō) is the 39th studio album by Japanese singer-songwriter Miyuki Nakajima, released in 2012.

== Track listing ==
All songs written and composed by Miyuki Nakajima and arranged by Ichizo Seo.

1. "Night-light (常夜灯, Jōyatō)"
2. "Pianissimo (ピアニシモ, Pianishimo)"
3. "Ungrateful (恩知らず, Onshirazu)" – 3:09
4. "When the Lilacs Bloom (リラの花咲く頃, Rira no hanasaku koro)"
5. "Consolation of Fallen Trees (倒木の敗者復活戦, Tōboku no haisha fukkatsusen)"
6. "You're Not in Love, Are You? (あなた恋していないでしょ, Anata koishite inaidesho)"
7. "Bedroom (ベッドルーム, Beddorūmu)"
8. "Crossing the Scramble Intersection (スクランブル交差点の渡り方, Sukuranburu kōsaten no watarikata)"
9. "Oriental Voice (オリエンタル・ヴォイス, Orientaru voisu)"
10. "Runner's High (ランナーズ・ハイ, Rannāzu hai)" – 5:55
11. "Whistle of the Wind (風の笛, Kaze no fue)"
12. "The Moon is Over There (月はそこにいる, Tsuki wa soko ni iru)"

== Personnel ==
- Miyuki Nakajima – Lead vocals
