= Short Stories (Miyuki Nakajima album) =

Short Stories (Tanpenshū)

Studio album by Miyuki Nakajima
- Released: 15 November 2000
- Recorded: CelIo Studios(Los Angeles); Epicurus Studios(Tokyo); PARADISE studio KOMAZAWA(Tokyo); Bunkamura Studio(Tokyo)
- Genre: Folk rock
- Length: 54:43
- Label: Yamaha Music Communications
- Producers: Ichizo Seo, Miyuki Nakajima

Miyuki Nakajima chronology
Sun: Wings (1999)	Short Stories (Tanpenshū) (2000)	Lullaby for the Soul (Kokoromoriuta) (2001)

Short Stories (短篇集, Tanpenshū) is the 28th studio album by Japanese singer-songwriter Miyuki Nakajima, released in November 2000. The album features commercially successful double A-Side single "Earthly Stars (Unsung Heroes)"/"Headlight, Taillight", which became the number-one hit in later years and sold more than a million copies in Japan alone.

== Track listing ==
All songs written and composed by Miyuki Nakajima, arranged by Ichizo Seo (except "Powdery Snow" co-arranged by David Campbell).

1. "Earthly Stars (Unsung Heroes) (地上の星, Chijou no Hoshi)" – 5:11
2. "Homecoming (帰省, Kisei)" – 5:17
3. "I'm Walking Along the Street of Dreams (夢の通り道を僕は歩いている, Yume no Tōrimichi wo Boku wa Aruiteiru)" – 4:35
4. "Regret (後悔, Koukai)" – 6:15
5. "Merry-Go-Round" – 5:54
6. "The Angel's Stairway (天使の階段, Tenshi no Kaidan)" – 4:24
7. "Passing Summer (過ぎゆく夏, Sugiyuku Natsu)" – 3:43
8. "Marriage (結婚, Kekkon)" – 2:32
9. "Powdery Snow (粉雪は忘れ薬, Konayuki wa Wasuregusuri)" – 6:32
10. "Tell Me, Sister" – 5:23
11. "Headlight, Taillight (ヘッドライト・テールライト, Heddoraito Teruraito)" – 4:57

== Personnel ==
=== Band ===
- Miyuki Nakajima – vocals
- Ichizo Seo – keyboards, strings arrangement & conduct
- Hideo Yamaki – tomtom, cymbals
- Russ Kunkel – drums
- Vinnie Colaiuta – drums
- Gregg Bissonette – drums
- Neil Stubenhaus – bass guitar
- Hideki Matsubara – bass guitar
- Leland Sklar – bass guitar
- Michael Thompson – electric and acoustic guitar
- Masayoshi Furukawa – electric guitar, 12-strings acoustic guitar
- Elton Nagata – keyboards, acoustic and electric piano
- Shingo Kobayashi – keyboards, acoustic piano
- Jon Gilutin – acoustic and electric piano, hammond B-3, keyboards
- Yasuharu Nakanishi – keyboards
- Keishi Urata- computer programming
- Seiichi Takubo – computer programming
- Yousuke Sugimoto – computer programming
- Brandon Fields – tenor sax

=== Backing vocalists ===
- Fumikazu Miyashita – backing and harmony vocals
- Yasuhiro Kido – backing vocals
- Katsumi Maeda – backing vocals
- Toshiro Kirigaya – backing vocals
- Etsuro Wakakonai – backing vocals
- Julia Waters – backing vocals
- Maxine Waters – backing vocals
- Carmen Twillie – backing vocals
- Monalisa Young – backing vocals
- Clydene Jackson Edwards – backing vocals
- Oren Waters – backing vocals
- Luther Waters – backing vocals
- Johnny Britt – backing vocals
- Joseph Powell – backing vocals
- Terry Young – backing vocals
- Rick Logan – backing vocals
- Randy Crenshaw – backing vocals
- John Batdorf – backing vocals

=== Additional personnel ===
- David Campbell – strings arrangement, conducting
- Suzie Katayama – conducting
- Masatsugu Shinozaki – violin, concertmaster
- Joel Derouin – violin, concertmaster
- Bruce Dukov – violin
- Mario De Leon – violin
- Armen Garabedian – violin
- Berj Garabedian – violin
- Endre Grant – violin
- Peter Kent – violin
- Rachel Purkin – violin
- Michele Richards – violin
- John Wittenberg – violin
- Charlie Bisharat – violin
- Brian Leonard – violin
- Robert Peterson – violin
- Haim Shtrim – violin
- Kiyo Kido – violin
- Jun Yamamoto – violin
- Yumiko Hirose – violin
- Osamu Inou – violin
- Kei Shinozaki – violin
- Yu Sugino – violin
- Naoyuki Takahashi – violin
- Kathrine Cash – violin
- Tsunehiro Shigyo – violin
- Keiko Nakamura – violin
- Machia Saito – violin
- Crusher Kimura – violin
- Takashi Kato – violin
- Masayoshi Fujiyama – violin
- Hitoshi Imano – violin
- Yukikane Murata – violin
- Jun Takeuchi – violin
- Akihiko Suzuki – violin
- Takayuki Oshigane – violin
- Akiko Kato – violin
- Hiroki Muto – violin
- Masako Mabuchi – viola
- Yuji Yamada – viola
- Gentaro Sakaguchi – viola
- Denyse Buffum – viola
- Matthew Funes – viola
- Janet Lakatos – viola
- Karie Prescott – viola
- Joshin Toyama – viola
- Gentaro Sakaguchi – viola
- Kaori Naruse – viola
- Masaharu Karita – cello
- Tomoya Kikuchi – cello
- Hiroki Kashiwagi – cello
- Yoshihiko Maeda – cello
- Masahiro Tanaka – cello
- Susumu Miyake – cello
- Steve Richards – cello
- Daniel Smith – cello
- Rudolph Stein – cello
- Paula Hoochatter – cello
- Don Markese – tin whistle, recorder

== Chart positions ==
=== Album ===
Year	Chart	Position	Sales
2000–03	Japanese Oricon Weekly Albums Chart	7	188,000+

=== Single ===
Year	Country	Song(s)	Chart	Position	Weeks	Sales
2000–03	Japan	"Earthly Stars (Unsung Heroes)" "Headlight, Taillight"	Oricon Weekly Singles Chart (top 100)	1	183	1.1 million+
2000–03	Japan	"Earthly Stars (Unsung Heroes)" "Headlight, Taillight"	Oricon Weekly Singles Chart (top 200)	1	202	1.1 million+
