= Okaerinasai (album) =

Studio album by Miyuki Nakajima
- Released: November 21, 1979
- Recorded: Epicurus and Take One Studios, Tokyo, Japan
- Genre: Folk, kayōkyoku
- Length: 44:00
- Label: AARD-VARK/Canyon, Yamaha Music Communications
- Producer: Miyuki Nakajima

Miyuki Nakajima chronology
Shin-ai Naru Mono e (1979)	Okaerinasai (1979)	Ikiteitemo Iidesuka (1980)

Okaerinasai (おかえりなさい) is the sixth studio album by Japanese singer-songwriter Miyuki Nakajima, released in November 1979.

Okaerinasai peaked at number two on the Japanese Oricon LP chart, and became one of her most commercially successful albums, selling over 530,000 copies.

== Background ==
The album contains self-cover versions of the songs Nakajima composed for other artists, including five top-40 hit singles—"Abayo" sung by Naoko Ken (topped the chart in 1976), "Shiawase Shibai" and "Oikakete Yokohama" recorded by Junko Sakurada (reached #3 and #11 on the chart from in 1977–78, respectively), "If I Could Take to the Sky" performed by Tokiko Kato (peaked at #14 in 1978), and "Ame..." by Rumiko Koyanagi (reached #25 in 1978). It also features the song "Rouge" which was initially issued as the title track on Naomi Chiaki's 1977 album of the same name. It was later widely recognized around the Asian countries, because of the cover version interpreted by Faye Wong on her album Coming Home in 1992.

== Track listing ==
All songs composed by Miyuki Nakajima, except the lyrics of "Yomaigoto" written by Yu Aku

=== Side one ===
No.	Title	Original performer	Length
1.	"Abayo" (あばよ) (arranged by Tsugutoshi Goto)	Naoko Ken	6:13
2.	"Kami" (髪) (arranged by Shun Fukui)	Graciela Susana	3:43
3.	"Sayonara o Tsutaete" (サヨナラを伝えて) (arranged by Shigeru Suzuki)	Naoko Ken	3:27
4.	"Shiawase Shibai" (しあわせ芝居) (arranged by Shigeru Suzuki)	Junko Sakurada	3:55
5.	"Ame…" (雨…; "Rain…") (arranged by Tsugutoshi Goto)	Rumiko Koyanagi	5:41

=== Side two ===
No.	Title	Original performer	Length
1.	"Kono Sora o Tobetara" (この空を飛べたら; "If I Could Take to the Sky") (arranged by Shigeru Suzuki)	Tokiko Kato	5:14
2.	"Yomaigoto" (世迷い言) (arranged by Osamu Tozuka)	Mimi Hiyoshi	3:33
3.	"Rouge" (ルージュ Rūju) (arranged by Osamu Tozuka)	Naomi Chiaki	4:33
4.	"Oikakete Yokohama" (追いかけてヨコハマ) (arranged by Tsugutoshi Goto)	Junko Sakurada	4:03
5.	"Tsuyogari wa Yose yo" (強がりはよせヨ) (arranged by Shun Fukui)	Naoko Ken	3:38

== Personnel ==
- Miyuki Nakajima - Lead vocal, acoustic guitar
- Toshiaki Usui - Acoustic guitar
- Hiromi Yasuda - Acoustic guitar
- Nobuo Tsunetomi - Acoustic guitar
- Yasushi Suehara - Acoustic guitar
- Chūei Yoshikawa - Acoustic guitar
- Shigeru Suzuki - Electric guitar
- Kimio Mizutani - Electric guitar
- Munemitsu Noguchi - Steel guitar
- Tsugotoshi Gotō - Electric bass
- Rei Ohara - Electric bass
- Shigehiro Takahashi - Electric bass
- Shigeaki Takebe - Electric bass
- Kazumi Okayama - Drums
- Eiji Shimamura - Drums
- Yūichi Togashiki - Drums
- Tatsuo Hayashi - Drums
- Nobu Saitō - Percussion
- Yasukazu Satō - Percussion
- Jun Sato - Keyboards
- Hiroshi Shibui - Keyboards
- Makiko Tashiro - Keyboards
- Hidetoshi Yamada - Keyboards
- Jake H. Conception - Saxophone
- Shin Kazuhara - Trumpet
- Eiji Arai - Trombone
- Sumio Okada - Trombone
- Yasuo Hirauchi - Trombone
- Masao Suzuki - Clarinet
- First Music - Strings
- Isao Kaneyama - Marimba
- Fumihiko Kazama - Midget Accordion
- Keiji Azami - Dulcimer
- Osamu Tozuka - Chorus
- Hiroshi Narumi - Chorus

== Production ==
- Designer: Hirofumi Arai
- Disk Promoter: Yoshiki Ishikawa
- Recording Director: Yoshio Okujima
- Recording & Mixing Engineer: Yoshihiko Kaminari, Koji Sakakibara, Shoya Mizutani
- Manager: Hiroshi Kojima
- Assistant Promotion Manager: Kunio Kaneko
- Disk Co-ordinator: Yuzo Watanabe
- Costume Designer: Mihoko Kiyokawa
- Art Director: Jin Tamura
- Remixing & Mastering Engineer: Kinji Yoshino
- General Producer: Genichi Kawakami
- Special Thanks to Sailor Shinohara

== Chart positions ==
Year	Country	Chart	Position	Sales
1979-80	Japan	Oricon Weekly LP Albums Chart (top 100)	2	533,000
1979-80	Japan	Oricon Weekly CT Albums Chart (top 100)	3	533,000

== See also ==
- 1979 in Japanese music
