= Aishiteiru to Ittekure =

Studio album by Miyuki Nakajima
- Released: April 10, 1978
- Recorded: Epicurus and the Hit Studios, Tokyo, Japan
- Genre: Folk
- Length: 40:00
- Labels: AARD-VARK/Canyon, Yamaha Music Communications
- Producer: Genichi Kawakami

Miyuki Nakajima chronology
A Ri Ga To U (1977)	Aishiteiru to Ittekure (1978)	Shin-ai Naru Mono e (1979)

Aishiteiru to Ittekure (愛していると云ってくれ) is the fourth studio album by Japanese singer-songwriter Miyuki Nakajima, released in April 1978.

Five months before the album came out, she topped on the Oricon singles chart with a song "The Parting Song (Wakareuta)", which was released as her fifth single in September 1977. The album features her commercial breakthrough single and another well-known song, "World's Context (Sejou)". The latter was later featured in the second series of TV drama Kimpachi Sensei aired on TBS in 1980, and became known widely as one of her signature songs.

Aishiteiru to Ittekure has been her longest charting album on the Oricon, because the album re-entered the chart when "World's Context" was featured on TV program in the early 1980s.

== Track listing ==
All songs written and composed by Miyuki Nakajima, unless otherwise noted

=== Side one ===
All tracks arranged by Kinji Yoshino (except "The Parting Song" co-arranged by Shun Fukui)

1. "Genki desuka (「元気ですか」)" (Poetry reading, sampling "Prelude, Fugue et Variation, Op. 18 " by César Franck on background music) – 2:58
2. "Reiko (怜子)" – 2:40
3. "The Parting Song (わかれうた, Wakareuta)" – 3:57
4. "Uminari (海鳴り)" – 3:27
5. "Keshou (化粧)" – 5:07

=== Side two ===
All tracks arranged by Kinji Yoshino (except "World's Context" co-arranged by Shun Fukui, "Milk 32" and "Omae no Ie" arranged by Miyuki Nakajima)

1. "Milk 32 (ミルク32, Miruku 32)" – 4:33
2. "Ahoudori (あほう鳥)" – 4:06
3. "Omae no Ie (おまえの家)" – 6:32
4. "World's Context (世情, Sejou)" – 6:12

== Personnel ==
- Miyuki Nakajima – vocals, acoustic guitar
- Toshiro Masuda – electric guitar
- Tsugutoshi Goto – electric bass
- Ryuichi Sakamoto – keyboards
- Nobu Saito – percussions
- Hiro Tsunoda – drums

== Production ==
- Recording director; Yoshio Okushima
- Recording and Mixing Engineer; Yoshihiko Kan'nari
- Assistant engineer; Koji Sakakibara
- Manager; Kunio Kaneko
- Director; Yūzō Watanabe
- Cover designer; Natsuo Ueda
- Photographer; Jin Tamura
- Executive producer; Genichi Kawakami

== Chart positions ==
Year	Country	Chart	Position	Sales
1978–1981	Japan	Oricon Weekly LP Albums Chart (top 100)	2	410,000+
1978–1981	Japan	Oricon Weekly CT Albums Chart (top 100)	6	410,000+

== See also ==
- 1978 in Japanese music
