= Hajimemashite (Miyuki Nakajima album) =

Studio album by Miyuki Nakajima
- Released: October 24, 1984
- Recorded: Epicurus Studios
- Genre: Folk rock / pop
- Length: 47:27
- Label: Canyon/AARD-VARK
- Producer: Miyuki Nakajima

Miyuki Nakajima chronology
Yokan (Hunch) (1983)	Hajimemashite (1984)	Change (Oiro Naoshi) (1985)

Hajimemashite (はじめまして, How Do You Do?) is the 11th studio album by Japanese singer-songwriter Miyuki Nakajima, released in October 1984.

== Track listing ==
All songs written and composed by Miyuki Nakajima.

1. "Boku wa Aoi Tori (僕は青い鳥)" – 5:27
2. "Koufukuron (幸福論)" – 3:03
3. "Hitori (ひとり)" [album version] – 5:03
4. "Umareta Toki kara (生まれた時から)" – 4:41
5. "Kanojo ni Yoroshiku (彼女によろしく)" – 4:38
6. "Furyou (不良)" – 5:15
7. "Cynical Moon (シニカル・ムーン, Shinikaru Mūn)" – 4:18
8. "Haru Made Nanbo (春までなんぼ)" – 5:09
9. "Bokutachi no Shourai (僕たちの将来)" – 5:15
10. "Nice to Meet You (はじめまして, Hajimemashite) – 4:38

== Chart positions ==
Year	Country	Chart	Position	Weeks	Sales
1984	Japan	Oricon Weekly LP Albums Chart (top 100)	1	17	300,000
1984	Japan	Oricon Weekly CT Albums Chart (top 100)	2	18	300,000

== See also ==
- 1984 in Japanese music
