= Yokan (album) =

Hunch (Yokan)

Studio album by Miyuki Nakajima
- Released: March 5, 1983
- Recorded: Epicurus Studios
- Genre: Folk rock / pop
- Length: 43:54
- Label: Canyon/AARD-VARK
- Producer: Miyuki Nakajima

Miyuki Nakajima chronology
Kansuigyo (1982)	Hunch (Yokan) (1983)	How Do You Do (Hajimemashite) (1984)

Hunch (予感, Yokan) is the tenth studio album by Japanese singer-songwriter Miyuki Nakajima, released in March 1983.

In addition to the songwriting and produce for the entire album, she also participated in arrangement for the first time, except five songs which were arranged by Takayuki Inoue and featured in the latter half of the LP.

The final track on Hunch became one of fan favorites for years, though none of the contents were released as a single when the album came out. "Fight" later appeared as a double A-Side of a chart topper single "Between the Sky and You", released in 1994 and sold over a million copies. The song which became well known because of commercial success of a single has been covered several times, interpreted by artists such as Takuro Yoshida, Noriyuki Makihara and Masaharu Fukuyama .

Hunch debuted at the number-one on the Japanese Oricon and retained the position for 3 weeks, but quickly fell off the chart compared to its predecessors that likewise reached the top.

== Track listing ==
All songs written and composed by Miyuki Nakajima.

=== Side one ===
All songs arranged by Miyuki Nakajima

1. "Only Two of Us (この世に二人だけ, Kono Yo ni Futari Dake)" – 5:00
2. "Natsu Miyage (夏土産)" – 4:35
3. "Kami wo Arau On'na (髪を洗う女)" – 4:29
4. "Bye Bye Dock of the Bay (ばいばいどくおぶざべい, Baibaidokuobuzabei)" – 6:26

=== Side two ===
All songs arranged by Takayuki Inoue

1. "Dare no Sei demo Nai Ame ga (誰のせいでもない雨が)" – 6:30
2. "En (縁)" – 3:3
3. "Drink the Tequila (テキーラを飲みほして, Tequila wo Nomihoshite)" – 3:16
4. "Goldfish (金魚, Kingyo)" – 3:05
5. "Fight! (ファイト!, Faito!)" – 7:04

== Personnel ==
- Yuichi Tokashiki – drums on "Only Two of Us", "Natsu Miyage", "Kami wo Arau On'na", "En"
- Hideo Yamaki – drums on "Bye Bye Dock of the Bay"
- Eiji Himamura – drums on "Tequila wo Nomihoshite", "Kingyo", "Fight"
- Jun Moriya – drums on "Dare no Sei demo Nai Ame ga"
- Akira Okazawa – bass on "Only Two of Us", "Natsu Miyage", "Kami wo Arai On'na", "Dare no Sei demo Nai Ame ga", "En"
- Yasuo Tomikura – bass on "Tequila wo Nomihoshite"
- Haruomi Hosono – bass on "Bye Bye Dock of the Bay"
- Fujimal Yoshino – electric guitar
- Ben Bridges – electric guitar on "Bye Bye Dock of the Bay", "Dare no Sei demo Nai Ame ga"
- Chuei Yoshikawa – acoustic guitar, 12-string guitar
- Nobuo Kurata – keyboards
- Nobu Saito – percussion
- Jake H Conception – tenor sax
- Eiji Arai – Trombone
- Shin Nagaoka – horn on "Dare no Sei demo Nai Ame ga"
- Koji Hashima – French horn on "Dare no Sei demo Nai Ame ga"
- Yoshikazu Kishi – French horn on "Dare no Sei demo Nai Ame ga"
- Yukio Eto – flute on "En"
- Takeru Shinohara – alto flute on "Fight!"
- Mitsuru Aiba – alto flute on "Fight!", Piccolo on "En"
- Obata – fagot on "En"
- Kenji Shiraishi – timpani on "En"
- Isao Kaneyama – malimba
- Sanae Tanaka – mandolin
- Ohno ensemble – strings on "Natsu Miyage"
- Scramble – strings on "Kami wo Arau On'na"
- Yasuhiro Kido – chorus
- Makoto Matsushita – chorus
- Miyuki Nakajima – vocals

== Chart positions ==
=== Album ===
Year	Country	Chart	Position	Weeks	Sales
1983	Japan	Oricon Weekly LP Albums Chart (top 100)	1	20	470,000+
1983	Japan	Oricon Weekly CT Albums Chart (top 100)	1	20	470,000+
1990	Japan	Oricon Weekly CD Albums Chart (top 100)	100	1	470,000+

=== Single ===
Year	Single	double A-Side	Chart	Position	Weeks	Sales	RIAJ Certification
1994	"Fight!"	"Between the Sky and You"	Japanese Oricon Weekly (top 100)	1	35	1,460,000+	6× Platinum

== See also ==
- 1983 in Japanese music
