= Goodbye Girl (Miyuki Nakajima album) =

Studio album by Miyuki Nakajima
- Released: November 16, 1988
- Recorded: Sound Valley, Z'd, Sound Inn, Vincent and Epicurus Studios
- Genre: Folk rock
- Length: 44:54
- Label: Pony Canyon/AARD-VARK
- Producer: Ichizo Seo, Miyuki Nakajima

Miyuki Nakajima chronology
Nakajima Miyuki (1988)	Goodbye Girl (1988)	Kaikinetsu (1989)

Goodbye Girl (グッバイ ガール, Gubbai Gāru) is the 16th studio album by Japanese singer-songwriter Miyuki Nakajima, released in November 1988.

The album includes "Namida", her own rendition of a song Nakajima originally wrote for Kiyoshi Maekawa. The song released as a single before the album came out was the first material which was co-produced by Ichizo Seo, who has been her long-term collaborator since then.

The album debuted at number one on the Oricon Chart.

== Track listing ==
- All songs written by Miyuki Nakajima.
1. "Nousagi no You ni (野ウサギのように)" – 4:22
2. "Fura Fura (ふらふら)" – 4:40
3. "Megami" – 4:53
4. "Ki ni Shinaide (気にしないで)" – 4:59
5. "December (十二月, Jūnigatsu)" – 3:59
6. "Tatoe Sekai ga Sora kara Ochitemo (たとえ世界が空から落ちても)" – 4:10
7. "Ai Yorimo (愛よりも)" – 6:10
8. "Namida (涙) -Made in Tears" – 5:08
9. "Fubuki (吹雪)" – 6:33

== Personnel ==
- Miyuki Nakajima – Lead and backing vocals
- Ichizo Seo – keyboards, backing vocals, computer programming
- Tsuyoshi Kon – electric guitar
- Hideo Saitō – electric guitar
- Chuei Yoshikawa – acoustic guitar
- Chiharu Mikuzuki – bass guitar
- Kenji Takamizu – bass guitar
- Yasuo Tomikura – bass guitar
- Nobuo Kurata – keyboards
- Yasuharu Nakanishi – keyboards
- Ken Shima – keyboards
- Elton Nagata – keyboards
- Tatsuhiko Mori – computer programming
- Keishi Urata – computer programming
- Nobuhiko Nakayama- computer programming
- Toshihiko Furumura – tenor sax
- Kazuyo Sugimoto – backing vocals
- Jun Aoyama – drums
- Hideo Yamaki – drums
- Toru Hasebe – drums
- Fairlight CMI, TR-707 – programming drums
- Tomota Group – strings
- Masatsugu Shinozaki – electric violin

== Chart positions ==
Chart (1988)	Peak position	Sales	RIAJ Certification
Japan Oricon Weekly Albums Chart (Top 100)	1	137,000+	Gold

== See also ==
- 1988 in Japanese music
