= 36.5 °C =

Studio album by Miyuki Nakajima
- Released: November 12, 1986
- Recorded: at the Peninsula, Wonder Station, Studio Two-two-One, Free Port, Hitokuchizaka, and Epicurus studios
- Genre: Folk rock, arena rock, kayokyoku
- Length: 43:51
- Label: Pony Canyon/AARD-VARK
- Producer: Yoshihiro Kai; Miyuki Nakajima (credited to "miss M.")

Miyuki Nakajima chronology
miss M. (1985)	36.5 °C (1986)	Utagoyomi (1987)

36.5 °C is the 14th studio album by Japanese singer-songwriter Miyuki Nakajima, released in November 1986.

== Track listing ==
All tracks are written by Miyuki Nakajima.

Side One
No.	Title	Length
1.	"My Summer Vacation (あたいの夏休み, Atai no Natsuyasumi)" (Album Mix)	5:10
2.	"The Worst (最悪, Saiaku)"	4:32
3.	"F.O."	4:47
4.	"Poisonous Woman (毒をんな, Dokuonna)"	7:15

Side Two
No.	Title	Length
1.	"Seaside Corporouse (シーサイド・コーポラス, Shisaido Koporasu)" (Edit)	1:32
2.	"Wild Cat (やまねこ, Yamaneko)"	4:01
3.	"Half"	6:57
4.	"Beauty in Revenge (見返り美人, Mikaeri Bijin)"	4:39
5.	"I Can Hear the Swan's Song (白鳥の歌が聞こえる, Hakuchou no Uta ga Kikoeru)"	4:59

== Personnel ==
- Miyuki Nakajima – Lead and backing vocals, acoustic guitar
- Masaki Matsubara – Guitar
- Kenji Kitajima – Guitar
- Fujimal Yoshino – Guitar
- Tsugutoshi Goto – Bass guitar
- Chiharu Mikuzuki – Bass guitar
- Akira Okazawa – Bass guitar
- Kouki Ito – Bass guitar
- Ichiro Tanaka – Sampling guitar
- Eve – Backing vocals
- Kazuyo Sugimoto – Backing vocals
- Kiyoshi Hiyama – Backing vocals
- Yasuhiro Kido – Backing vocals
- Stevie Wonder – Synthesizer
- Tadashi Nanba – Synthesizer
- Hidetoshi Yamada – Synthesizer
- Eiji Segawa – Synthesizer
- Katsuhiko Kamitsuna – Synthesizer
- Elton Nagata – Synthesizer
- Nobuo Kurata – Acoustic piano
- Hal-Oh Togashi – Electric piano
- Joe Hisaishi – Synthesizer programming, sequencer programming and drum machine programming
- Kazuo Shiina – Synthesizer programming, sequencer programming and drum machine programming
- Motoki Funayama – Synthesizer programming, sequencer programming and drum machine programming
- Yasuko Fukuoka – Synthesizer programming, sequencer programming
- Hideki Matsutake – Synthesizer programming
- Hiroshi Sukegawa – Synthesizer programming
- Masato Kawai – Synthesizer Programming
- Motoya Hamaguchi – Percussion
- Yutaka Uehara – Drums
- Hideo Yamaki – Drums
- Yuichi Tokashiki – Drums
- Jun Aoyama – Drums
- Jake H. Concepcion – Alto sax, soprano sax
- Kiyoshi Saito – Alto sax

== Chart positions ==
Year	Country	Chart	Position	Sales
1986	Japan	Oricon Weekly CD Albums Chart (top 100)	1	237,000
1986	Japan	Oricon Weekly LP Albums Chart (top 100)	2	237,000
1986	Japan	Oricon Weekly CT Albums Chart (top 100)	4	237,000

== See also ==
- 1986 in Japanese music
