= Wakareuta =

"The Parting Song (Wakareuta)"

Single by Miyuki Nakajima

from the album Aishiteiru to Ittekure
- B-side: "On the Platform"
- Released: September 10, 1977
- Genre: Folk/Kayokyoku
- Length: 3:57
- Label: Canyon Records/AARD-VARK
- Songwriter: Miyuki Nakajima

Miyuki Nakajima singles chronology
"Yokaze no Naka kara" (1976)	"The Parting Song (Wakareuta)" (1977)	"Omoide Gawa" (1978)

"Wakareuta" (わかれうた, Wakareuta) (translated into English as "The Parting Song" in the liner notes of Miyuki Nakajima's Ima no Kimochi album, released in 2004) is a song composed and performed by Japanese singer-songwriter Miyuki Nakajima, released as her fifth single in September 1977.

"The Parting Song" topped the Oricon chart three months after its release.

The song also appeared on her fourth studio album Aishiteiru to Ittekure released in 1978. Nakajima's inclusion of the song on her 2004 album Ima no Kimochi comprises remake versions of her early efforts. A live performance from her 1991 experimental jukebox musical Yakai Vol.3 Kantan appeared on DVD.

"The Parting Song" has been covered by recording artists including Naoko Ken, Yoshie Kashiwabara, Natsuko Godai, Hideaki Tokunaga, and Ken Hirai with Masamune Kusano.

== Track listing (7" vinyl) ==
All songs written and composed by Miyuki Nakajima, arranged by Shun Fukui ("The Parting Song" co-arranged by Kinji Yoshino)

1. "Wakareuta (わかれうた, Wakareuta)" (the parting song) - 3:57
2. "Hōmu Nite (ホームにて, Hōmu Nite)" (on the platform) - 4:50

== Chart positions ==
Chart (1977–78)	Peak position	Sales
Japanese Oricon Weekly Singles Chart	1	769,000+

== See also ==
- 1977 in Japanese music
