= Genichi Kawakami =

Japanese businessman (1912–2002)

Genichi Kawakami (川上 源一, Kawakami Gen'ichi; January 30, 1912 – May 25, 2002) was the president of the Yamaha Corporation from 1950 to 1977, and again from 1980 to 1983. He is often credited with the international success of Yamaha and was also widely influential as a community music educator.

Born in Hamakita, Kawakami was a graduate of Takachiho College of Commerce. He started working for Yamaha in 1937, where his father, Kaichi Kawakami had been the president since 1927. Kawakami succeeded his father and introduced motorcycle production to Yamaha (Yamaha Motor Corporation). Retired in 1976, he wrote several books on music and founded the largest and most popular system of community music schools in the world. He died in Hamamatsu at the age of 90 of natural causes.

Kawakami was married to Tamiko and had a son and a daughter.
