= Shizuka Kudo discography =

- Studio albums: 19
- EPs: 1
- Compilation albums: 14
- Singles: 43
- Video albums: 6
- Music videos: 39
- Cover albums: 2
- Live video albums: 12
- Box sets: 2

Japanese singer Shizuka Kudo has released nineteen studio albums, fourteen compilation albums, one EP, two cover albums, six video albums, twelve live video albums, two box sets, and forty-three singles (including one as a featured artist and one novelty single). Her career began in 1985 when she debuted as one of the three vocalists of the girl group Seventeen Club. The short-lived group disbanded after two unsuccessful singles. In 1986, she joined the idol girl group Onyanko Club as member number 38, which led to Kudo forming the subgroup Ushirogami Hikaretai the following year. She released her first solo single, "Kindan no Telepathy", on the same day as the last broadcast of the variety show Yūyake Nyan Nyan, from which the Onyanko Club members originated. It debuted at number one on the Oricon Singles Chart and became the first of eleven total number-one singles released in the late 1980s and early 1990s, including "Koi Hitoyo", "Arashi no Sugao", "Kuchibiru Kara Biyaku", "Senryū no Shizuku" and "Please". Miyuki Nakajima penned the following singles released by Kudo during this era: "Fu-ji-tsu", "Mugon... Iroppoi", "Kōsa ni Fukarete", "Watashi ni Tsuite" and Dōkoku". All five singles debuted at number one and, with total sales exceeding a million, "Dōkoku" became the best-selling single of Kudo's career.

In 1994, Kudo parted ways with record producer Tsugutoshi Gotō, who had been responsible for writing and producing her songs since her solo debut, and began producing and co-writing her own material. That year, she released the album Expose, which produced the two top-ten singles "Blue Rose" and "Jaguar Line", and branched out into different musical genres and a more mature sound with the subsequent self-produced albums, Purple, Doing and Dress. She teamed up with Nakajima on the single, "Gekijō", the first of Kudo's songs to be written entirely by Nakajima, which became her best-selling single not produced by Gotō. In 1998, she released I'm Not, entirely written and produced by Sharam Q guitarist Hatake, which yielded the Dragon Ball GT ending theme "Blue Velvet". The same year she released "Kirara", which ranked at number six on the Oricon Singles Chart, becoming her last single to peak in the top-ten.

In 2000, Kudo signed with Extasy Japan, founded by Yoshiki, who produced her first single released under the label, "Shinku no Hana". Two years later, after the birth of her first child, she went on to release her only studio album for the label, Jewelry Box. Kudo rejoined Pony Canyon, her former label, in 2005, for which she released her first album in three years, Tsukikage. She released a slew of singles, compilation albums and a cover album in the following years. In 2017, in celebration of her 30th anniversary, Kudo released Rin, her first studio album in twelve years. It debuted at number 21 on the Oricon Albums Chart, becoming her highest-charting album in nineteen years. As of August 2013, Kudo has sold 15 million records as a solo artist in Japan alone, making her one of the best-selling Japanese music artists of all time.

== Albums ==
=== Studio albums ===
List of studio albums, with selected chart positions, sales figures and certifications
Title	Album details	Peak chart positions		Sales (Note: Physical CD sales figures provided by Oricon database are rounded to the nearest thousand copies.)	Certifications
Title	Album details	JPN Oricon	JPN Billboard (Note: Billboard Japan Hot Albums chart includes both digital and physical sales, while the Top Albums Sales chart only tallies physical sales.)	Sales	Certifications
Mysterious	Released: January 21, 1988; Label: Pony Canyon; Formats: LP, cassette, CD	3	—	233,000	
Shizuka	Released: July 21, 1988; Label: Pony Canyon; Formats: LP, cassette, CD	1	—	265,000	
Joy	Released: March 15, 1989; Label: Pony Canyon; Formats: LP, cassette, CD	1	—	416,000	RIAJ: Platinum
Karelia	Released: October 4, 1989; Label: Pony Canyon; Formats: Cassette, CD	2	—	293,000	RIAJ: Gold
Rosette	Released: April 4, 1990; Label: Pony Canyon; Formats: Cassette, CD	1	—	265,000	RIAJ: Gold
Mind Universe	Released: March 6, 1991; Label: Pony Canyon; Formats: Cassette, CD	1	—	247,000	RIAJ: Gold
Trinity	Released: March 18, 1992; Label: Pony Canyon; Formats: Cassette, CD	3	—	200,000	RIAJ: Gold
Rise Me	Released: April 1, 1993; Label: Pony Canyon; Formats: Cassette, CD	3	—	183,000	RIAJ: Gold
Expose	Released: September 7, 1994; Label: Pony Canyon; Formats: Cassette, CD	5	—	124,000	RIAJ: Gold
Purple	Released: August 2, 1995; Label: Pony Canyon; Formats: CD	7	—	140,000	
Doing	Released: May 17, 1996; Label: Pony Canyon; Formats: CD	16	—	52,000	
Dress	Released: March 19, 1997; Label: Pony Canyon; Formats: CD	18	—	31,000	
I'm Not	Released: April 29, 1998; Label: Pony Canyon; Formats: CD	19	—	29,000	
Full of Love	Released: June 2, 1999; Label: Pony Canyon; Formats: CD	38	—	12,000	
Jewelry Box	Released: July 3, 2002; Label: Extasy Japan; Formats: CD	60	—	4,000	
Tsukikage	Released: June 1, 2005; Label: Pony Canyon; Formats: CD, digital download	86	—	3,000	
Rin	Released: August 30, 2017; Label: Pony Canyon; Formats: CD, digital download	21	30	4,000	
Meikyo Shisui	Released: July 3, 2024; Label: Pony Canyon; Formats: CD, digital download	17	15	3,000	
Dynamic	Released: June 24, 2026; Label: Pony Canyon; Formats: CD, digital download	35	—	1,914	
"—" denotes a recording that did not chart or was not released in that territory.

=== Cover albums ===
List of studio albums, with selected chart positions, sales figures and certifications
Title	Album details	Peak chart positions		Sales
Title	Album details	JPN Oricon	JPN Billboard	Sales
Shōwa no Kaidan Vol. 1	Released: October 30, 2002; Label: Extasy Japan; Formats: CD	66	—	5,000
My Precious: Shizuka Sings Songs of Miyuki	Released: August 20, 2008; Label: Pony Canyon; Formats: CD, digital download	20	24	13,000
Deep Breath	Released: June 12, 2019; Label: Pony Canyon; Formats: CD, digital download	36	—	1,300
Aoi Honō	Released: March 10, 2021; Label: Pony Canyon; Formats: CD, digital download	23	21	3,000
「感受」Shizuka Kudo 35th Anniversary self-cover album	Released: July 20, 2022; Label: Pony Canyon; Formats: CD, digital download	22	20	6,000
"—" denotes a recording that did not chart or was not released in that territory.

=== Compilation albums ===
List of studio albums, with selected chart positions, sales figures and certifications
Title	Album details	Peak chart positions		Sales	Certifications
Title	Album details	JPN Oricon	JPN Billboard	Sales	Certifications
Gradation	Released: November 30, 1988; Label: Pony Canyon; Formats: LP, cassette, CD	2	—	616,000	
Harvest	Released: December 6, 1989; Label: Pony Canyon; Formats: Cassette, CD	2	—	419,000	RIAJ: Platinum
Unlimited	Released: November 14, 1990; Label: Pony Canyon; Formats: Cassette, CD	2	—	454,000	RIAJ: Platinum
Intimate	Released: December 11, 1991; Label: Pony Canyon; Formats: Cassette, CD	4	—	321,000	RIAJ: Platinum
Best of Ballade: Empathy	Released: November 20, 1992; Label: Pony Canyon; Formats: Cassette, CD	6	—	180,000	RIAJ: Gold
Super Best	Released: November 19, 1993; Label: Pony Canyon; Formats: Cassette, MiniDisc, CD	6	—	234,000	RIAJ: Gold
She: Best of Best	Released: December 16, 1996; Label: Pony Canyon; Formats: CD	8	—	142,000	RIAJ: Gold
Best of Ballade: Current	Released: November 18, 1998; Label: Pony Canyon; Formats: CD	9	—	65,000	
Millennium Best	Released: March 15, 2000; Label: Pony Canyon; Formats: CD	25	—	36,000	
Shizuka Kudo Best	Released: December 5, 2001; Label: Pony Canyon; Formats: CD	—	23		
Shizuka Kudo 20th Anniversary the Best	Released: August 29, 2007; Label: Pony Canyon; Formats: CD	32	—	19,000	
20th Anniversary B-side collection	Released: March 5, 2008; Label: Pony Canyon; Formats: CD	34	—	2,000	
My Treasure Best: Miyuki Nakajima × Tsugutoshi Gotō Collection	Released: February 18, 2015; Label: Pony Canyon; Formats: CD	22	18	13,000	
My Heartful Best: Gorō Matsui Collection	Released: March 9, 2016; Label: Pony Canyon; Formats: CD	28	32	3,000	
"—" denotes a recording that did not chart or was not released in that territory.

== Extended plays ==
List of studio albums, with selected chart positions, sales figures and certifications
Title	EP details	Peak chart positions	Sales
Title	EP details	JPN	Sales
Euro Shizuka Kudo	Released: September 20, 2000; Label: Pony Canyon; Formats: CD	72	3,000

== Box sets ==
List of studio albums, with selected chart positions, sales figures and certifications
Title	Box set details	Peak chart positions	Sales
Title	Box set details	JPN	Sales
My Favorite Songs: Original Best	Released: October 30, 2002; Label: Pony Canyon; Formats: CD	—	
Shizuka Kudo Original Album Collection	Released: October 30, 2012; Label: Pony Canyon; Formats: CD	226	400

== Singles ==
=== As lead artist ===
Title	Year	Peak chart positions		Sales	Certifications	Album
Title	Year	Oricon Singles Chart	Billboard Japan Top Singles Sales (Note: Billboard Japan Hot 100 chart includes both digital sales and physical CD singles sales, while the Top Singles Sales chart only counts physical sales.)	Sales	Certifications	Album
"Kindan no Telepathy"	1987	1	—	146,000		Mysterious
"Again"	1987	3	—	159,000		Mysterious
"Daite Kuretara Ii no ni"	1988	3	—	182,000		Non-album single
"Fu-ji-tsu"	1988	1	—	253,000		Shizuka
"Mugon... Iroppoi"	1988	1	—	541,000		Non-album single
"Koi Hitoyo"	1989	1	—	607,000		Joy
"Arashi no Sugao"	1989	1	—	524,000	RIAJ: Platinum	Non-album singles
"Kōsa ni Fukarete"	1989	1	—	586,000	RIAJ: Platinum	Non-album singles
"Kuchibiru Kara Biyaku"	1990	1	—	489,000	RIAJ: Platinum	Rosette
"Senryū no Shizuku"	1990	1	—	295,000	RIAJ: Gold	Non-album singles
"Watashi ni Tsuite"	1990	1	—	265,000	RIAJ: Gold	Non-album singles
"Boya Boya Dekinai"	1991	2	—	324,000	RIAJ: Gold	Mind Universe
"Please"	1991	1	—	191,000	RIAJ: Gold	Non-album singles
"Metamorphose"	1991	2	—	440,000	RIAJ: Platinum	Non-album singles
"Mechakucha ni Naite Shimaitai"	1992	4	—	282,000	RIAJ: Gold	Trinity
"Urahara"	1992	5	—	214,000	RIAJ: Gold	Non-album singles
"Koe o Kikasete"	1992	5	—	326,000	RIAJ: Gold	Non-album singles
"Dōkoku"	1993	1	—	939,000	RIAJ: 2× Platinum (Note: Certification for physical CD single sales.); RIAJ: Gold (Note: Certification for digital download sales.)	Rise Me
"Watashi wa Knife"	1993	6	—	187,000	RIAJ: Gold	Non-album singles
"Anata Shika Inai Desho"	1993	5	—	205,000	RIAJ: Gold	Non-album singles
"Blue Rose"	1994	8	—	305,000	RIAJ: Gold	Expose
"Jaguar Line"	1994	8	—	244,000	RIAJ: Gold	Expose
"Ice Rain"	1994	8	—	414,000	RIAJ: Gold	Purple
"Moon Water"	1995	14	—	172,000	RIAJ: Gold	Purple
"7"	1995	15	—	83,000		Doing
"Chō"	1996	15	—	73,000		Doing
"Yū"	1996	26	—	73,000		Non-album single
"Gekijō"	1996	10	—	424,000	RIAJ: Platinum	Dress
"Blue Velvet"	1997	8	—	267,000	RIAJ: Gold	I'm Not
"Kama Sutra no Densetsu"	1997	29	—	37,000		I'm Not
"Setsu Getsu Ka"	1998	23	—	89,000		Non-album singles
"Kirara"	1998	6	—	384,000	RIAJ: Platinum	Non-album singles
"Isshun"	1998	29	—	27,000		Non-album singles
"Blue Zone"	1999	28	—	20,000		Full of Love
"Shinku no Hana"	2000	33	—	22,000		Jewelry Box
"Maple"	2002	35	—	12,000		Jewelry Box
"Lotus (Umareshi Hana)"	2005	40	—	8,000		Tsukikage
"Kokoro no Chikara"	2005	60	—	4,000		Tsukikage
"Clāvis (Kagi)"	2006	67	—	4,000		Non-album singles
"Amayo no Tsuki ni"	2007	44	—	8,000		Non-album singles
"Night Wing"	2008	75	88	2,000		Non-album singles
"Yukigasa"	2008	75	88	2,000		Non-album singles
"Kimi ga Kureta Mono"	2012	50	50	2,000		Non-album singles
"Yusha no Hata"	2023	28	26	1,000		Meikyo Shinkou
"—" denotes a recording that did not chart or was not released in that territory.

=== As featured artist ===
Title	Year	Peak chart positions	Sales
Title	Year	Oricon Singles Chart	Sales
"Akashiya Sanma-san ni Kiite Minai to ne" (Sanma Akashiya and George Tokoro featuring Shizuka Kudo)	1999	30	30,000

=== Other appearances ===
Title	Year	Peak chart positions	Sales	Certifications
Title	Year	Oricon Singles Chart	Sales	Certifications
"A.S.A.P." (as Little Kiss)	1997	3	498,000	RIAJ: Platinum
