= Millennium Best =

Compilation album by Shizuka Kudo
- Released: March 15, 2000
- Recorded: 1987–99
- Genre: Pop
- Length: 177:25
- Label: Pony Canyon

Shizuka Kudo chronology
Full of Love (1999)	Millennium Best (2000)	Euro Shizuka Kudo (2000)

Millennium Best (ミレニアム・ベスト, Mireniamu Besuto) is the ninth compilation album by Japanese singer Shizuka Kudo. It was released on March 15, 2000, through Pony Canyon. It is Kudo's second single collection: the album features all of Kudo's singles released from "Kindan no Telepathy" (1987) up to her most recent at the time, "Blue Zone" (1999), as well as all five singles released by Ushirogami Hikaretai. The album was released digitally on May 28, 2014, however only the four singles missing from the subsequently released compilation Shizuka Kudo Best were made available for download.

== Background ==
The album was released without Kudo's consent, after she had already left Pony Canyon. According to Kudo, she only came to know of the compilation's existence when she stumbled onto it when flipping through the CD racks of a convenience store.

== Commercial performance ==
Millennium Best debuted at number 25 on the Oricon Albums Chart, with 18,000 units sold. The album charted in the top 100 for a total of five consecutive weeks, selling a reported 36,000 copies during its chart run.

== Track listing ==
Disc 1 All tracks composed and arranged by Tsugutoshi Gotō.
No.	Title	Lyrics	Length
1.	"Toki no Kawa o Koete" (時の河を越えて, "Across the River of Time")	Yasushi Akimoto	3:52
2.	"Anata o Shiritai" (あなたを知りたい, "I Wanna Know You")	Akimoto	3:45
3.	"Kindan no Telepathy"	Akimoto	3:47
4.	"Moebius no Koibito" (メビウスの恋人, Mebiusu no Koibito, "Moebius Lover")	Akimoto	3:49
5.	"Again"	Akimoto	4:15
6.	"Hora ne, Haru ga Kita" (ほらね、春が来た, "Look! Spring Has Come")	Akimoto	4:07
7.	"Daite Kuretara Ii no ni"	Gorō Matsui	5:07
8.	"Gokitai Kudasai!" (ご期待下さい!, "Get Excited!")	Akimoto	4:02
9.	"Fu-ji-tsu"	Miyuki Nakajima	3:49
10.	"Mugon... Iroppoi"	Nakajima	3:54
11.	"Koi Hitoyo"	Matsui	4:32
12.	"Arashi no Sugao"	Yoshiko Miura	3:32
13.	"Kōsa ni Fukarete"	Nakajima	3:49
Total length:			52:20

Disc 2 All tracks composed by Gotō.
No.	Title	Lyrics	Arranger(s)	Length
1.	"Kuchibiru Kara Biyaku"	Matsui	Draw4	3:56
2.	"Senryū no Shizuku"	Aeri	Draw4	4:43
3.	"Watashi ni Tsuite"	Nakajima	Draw4	4:08
4.	"Boya Boya Dekinai"	Matsui	Gotō	3:41
5.	"Please"	Miura	Gotō	4:17
6.	"Metamorphose"	Matsui	Gotō; Satoshi Kadokura	4:16
7.	"Mechakucha ni Naite Shimaitai"	Matsui	Gotō; Kadokura	5:00
8.	"Urahara"	Matsui	Gotō	4:54
9.	"Koe o Kikasete"	Matsui	Gotō; Naoki Takao	6:36
10.	"Dōkoku"	Nakajima	Gotō; Takao	4:48
11.	"Watashi wa Knife"	Matsui	Gotō; Kadokura; Takao	4:26
12.	"Anata Shika Inai Desho"	Matsui	Gotō; Kadokura; Takao	6:24
Total length:				57:09

Disc 3
No.	Title	Writer(s)	Arranger(s)	Length
1.	"Blue Rose"	Aeri; Takashi Tsushimi	Taisuke Sawachika	4:40
2.	"Jaguar Line"	Aeri; Masaya Ozeki	Ichirō Hada	4:08
3.	"Ice Rain"	Aeri; Tsushimi	Kadokura	6:02
4.	"Moon Water"	Aeri; Arata Tanimoto	Sawachika	5:12
5.	"7"	Aeri; Toshiaki Matsumoto	Akihisa Matsūra	5:46
6.	"Chō"	Aeri; Naoyuki Fujī; Matsūra	Matsūra	5:09
7.	"Yū"	Aeri; Hideya Nakazaki	Kadokura	4:53
8.	"Gekijō"	Nakajima	Ichizō Seo	4:38
9.	"Blue Velvet"	Aeri; Hatake	Hatake	3:55
10.	"Kama Sutra no Densetsu"	Aeri; Hatake	Hatake	4:53
11.	"Setsu Getsu Ka"	Nakajima	Seo	4:46
12.	"Kirara"	ЯK	Sawachika	4:52
13.	"Isshun"	ЯK	Sawachika	4:48
14.	"Blue Zone"	Aeri; Tsushimi	Sawachika	4:14
Total length:				67:56

== Charts ==
Chart (2000)	Peak position	Sales
Japan Weekly Albums (Oricon)	25	36,000
