= Shizuka Kudo 20th Anniversary the Best =

Compilation album by Shizuka Kudo
- Released: August 29, 2007
- Recorded: 1987–2007
- Genre: Pop
- Length: 150:40
- Label: Pony Canyon

Shizuka Kudo chronology
Tsukikage (2005)	Shizuka Kudo 20th Anniversary the Best (2007)	20th Anniversary B-side collection (2008)

Shizuka Kudo 20th Anniversary the Best is the eleventh compilation album by Japanese singer Shizuka Kudo. It was released in celebration of Kudo's 20th anniversary since her solo debut on August 29, 2007, through Pony Canyon. The compilation includes a selection of Kudo's singles released up until "Amayo no Tsuki ni". The limited edition comes with a DVD featuring the music videos for "Lotus (Umareshi Hana)", "Kokoro no Chikara", "Clāvis (Kagi)" and "Amayo no Tsuki ni", as well as a digest of Kudo's live performances. Shizuka Kudo 20th Anniversary the Best was the first of three releases to celebrate Kudo's 20th, it was followed by the video album box set Shizuka Kudo The Live DVD Complete Box in September 2007, and the B-side compilation, "20th Anniversary B-side collection" in 2008.

== Background ==
Shizuka Kudo 20th Anniversary the Best is a compilation album that features twenty-nine out of forty of Kudo's A-sides released since her solo debut single "Kindan no Telepathy", all the way up to "Amayo no Tsuki ni". The tracks are spread out over two discs. The second disc includes three bonus tracks: a cover of "Manjūshaka", originally sung by Momoe Yamaguchi, as well as self-cover recordings of Kudo's chart-topping "Koi Hitoyo" and the signature ballad "Mechakucha ni Naite Shimaitai".

== Commercial performance ==
Shizuka Kudo 20th Anniversary the Best debuted at number 25 on the Oricon Albums Chart, with 7,000 units sold. The album charted in the top 300 for a total of seven weeks, selling a reported 19,000 copies during its chart run.

== Track listing ==
Disc 1
No.	Title	Writer(s)	Arranger(s)	Length
1.	"Kindan no Telepathy"	Yasushi Akimoto; Tsugutoshi Gotō	Gotō	3:45
2.	"Again"	Akimoto; Gotō	Gotō	4:13
3.	"Daite Kuretara Ii no ni"	Gorō Matsui; Gotō	Gotō	5:05
4.	"Fu-ji-tsu"	Miyuki Nakajima; Gotō	Gotō	3:45
5.	"Mugon... Iroppoi"	Nakajima; Gotō	Gotō	3:52
6.	"Koi Hitoyo"	Matsui; Gotō	Gotō	4:29
7.	"Arashi no Sugao"	Yoshiko Miura; Gotō	Gotō	3:29
8.	"Kōsa ni Fukarete"	Nakajima; Gotō	Gotō	3:47
9.	"Kuchibiru Kara Biyaku"	Matsui; Gotō	Draw4	3:54
10.	"Senryū no Shizuku"	Aeri; Gotō	Draw4	4:41
11.	"Watashi ni Tsuite"	Nakajima; Gotō	Draw4	4:05
12.	"Boya Boya Dekinai"	Matsui; Gotō	Gotō	3:38
13.	"Metamorphose"	Matsui; Gotō	Gotō; Satoshi Kadokura	4:13
14.	"Mechakucha ni Naite Shimaitai"	Matsui; Gotō	Gotō; Kadokura	4:57
15.	"Koe o Kikasete"	Matsui; Gotō	Gotō; Kadokura; Naoki Takao	6:34
16.	"Dōkoku"	Nakajima; Gotō	Gotō; Takao	4:45
17.	"Anata Shika Inai Desho"	Matsui; Gotō	Gotō; Kadokura; Takao	6:25
Total length:				75:37

Disc 2
No.	Title	Writer(s)	Arranger(s)	Length
1.	"Blue Rose"	Aeri; Takashi Tsushimi	Taisuke Sawachika	4:38
2.	"Jaguar Line"	Aeri; Masaya Ozeki	Ichirō Hada	4:06
3.	"Ice Rain"	Aeri; Tsushimi	Kadokura	6:00
4.	"Yū"	Aeri; Hideya Nakazaki	Kadokura	4:51
5.	"Gekijō"	Nakajima	Ichizō Seo	4:36
6.	"Blue Velvet"	Aeri; Hatake	Hatake	3:53
7.	"Setsu Getsu Ka"	Nakajima	Seo	4:46
8.	"Kirara"	ЯK	Sawachika	4:51
9.	"Lotus (Umareshi Hana)"	Aeri; Hiroo Yamaguchi	Sadahiro Nakano	5:13
10.	"Kokoro no Chikara"	Takahiro Maeda; H-Wonder	H-Wonder	5:01
11.	"Clāvis (Kagi)"	Nakajima	Seo	5:56
12.	"Amayo no Tsuki ni"	Aeri; Yamaguchi	Kunio Kubota	5:03
13.	"Manjūshaka" (曼珠沙華, "Red Spider Lily")	Yoko Aki; Ryudo Uzaki	Keiji Tanabe	5:40
14.	"Koi Hitoyo" (2007 Classical Version)	Matsui; Gotō	Jun Satō	4:54
15.	"Mechakucha ni Naite Shimaitai" (2007 Jazz Version)	Matsui; Gotō	Nori Shiota	5:34
Total length:				75:02

Disc 3 – DVD
No.	Title	Length
1.	"20th Live Digest"
2.	"Lotus (Umareshi Hana)" (Music Video)	5:13
3.	"Kokoro no Chikara" (Music Video)	5:00
4.	"Clāvis (Kagi)" (Music Video)	5:56
5.	"Amayo no Tsuki ni" (Music Video)	5:03

== Charts ==
Chart (2007–15)	Peak position
Japan Weekly Albums (Oricon)	25
Japan Weekly Albums (Recochoku)	15
