= Super Best (Shizuka Kudo album) =

Compilation album by Shizuka Kudo
- Released: November 19, 1993
- Recorded: 1987–93
- Genre: Pop
- Length: 95:50
- Label: Pony Canyon

Shizuka Kudo chronology
Rise Me (1993)	Super Best (1993)	Expose (1994)

Super Best is the sixth compilation album by Japanese singer Shizuka Kudo. It was released on November 19, 1993, through Pony Canyon. It is Kudo's first single collection, featuring all A-sides produced by Tsugutoshi Gotō and released by Kudo since her solo debut, from "Kindan no Telepathy" up to the most recent at the time, "Anata Shika Inai Desho", spread out on two discs. The compilation also includes one new song, entitled "Honō no Naka e", which was written specifically for the album and which marks the last collaboration with Gotō until 2015, when he composed "Tan Jun Ai vs Hontō no Ai" for the compilation My Treasure Best: Miyuki Nakajima × Tsugutoshi Gotō Collection. Super Best was re-released in APO-CD format on December 1, 1993.

== Commercial performance ==
Super Best debuted at number six on the Oricon Albums Chart, with 60,000 units sold. It dropped two positions to number eight on its second week, with 41,000 copies sold. The album charted in the top 100 for fourteen consecutive weeks, selling a reported total of 227,000 copies during its chart run. The re-release charted for a sole week at number 69 with 7,000 copies sold, bringing total sales of the album to 234,000 copies.

== Track listing ==
All tracks composed by Tsugutoshi Gotō.

Disc 1
No.	Title	Lyrics	Arranger(s)	Length
1.	"Kindan no Telepathy"	Yasushi Akimoto	Tsugutoshi Gotō	3:46
2.	"Again"	Akimoto	Gotō	4:14
3.	"Daite Kuretara Ii no ni"	Gorō Matsui	Gotō	5:06
4.	"Fu-ji-tsu"	Miyuki Nakajima	Gotō	3:48
5.	"Mugon... Iroppoi"	Nakajima	Gotō	3:55
6.	"Koi Hitoyo"	Matsui	Gotō	4:31
7.	"Arashi no Sugao"	Yoshiko Miura	Gotō	3:31
8.	"Kōsa ni Fukarete"	Nakajima	Gotō	3:49
9.	"Kuchibiru Kara Biyaku"	Matsui	Draw4	3:56
10.	"Senryū no Shizuku"	Aeri	Draw4	4:41
Total length:				41:17

Disc 2
No.	Title	Lyrics	Arranger(s)	Length
1.	"Watashi ni Tsuite"	Nakajima	Draw4	4:06
2.	"Boya Boya Dekinai"	Matsui	Gotō	3:41
3.	"Please"	Miura	Gotō	4:17
4.	"Metamorphose"	Matsui	Gotō; Satoshi Kadokura	4:15
5.	"Mechakucha ni Naite Shimaitai"	Matsui	Gotō; Kadokura	4:59
6.	"Urahara"	Matsui	Gotō	4:54
7.	"Koe o Kikasete"	Matsui	Gotō; Naoki Takao	6:35
8.	"Dōkoku"	Nakajima	Gotō; Takao	4:48
9.	"Watashi wa Knife"	Matsui	Gotō; Kadokura; Takao	4:26
10.	"Anata Shika Inai Desho"	Matsui	Gotō; Kadokura; Takao	6:26
11.	"Honō no Naka e" (炎の中へ, "Into the Flames")	Miura	Gotō; Kadokura; Takao	6:06
Total length:				54:33

== Charts ==
=== Standard edition ===
Chart (1993)	Peak position	Sales
Japan Weekly Albums (Oricon)	6	227,000

=== Re-issue edition ===
Chart (1993)	Peak position	Sales
Japan Weekly Albums (Oricon)	69	7,000

== Certification ==
Region	Certification	Certified units/sales
Japan (RIAJ)	Gold	234,000

== Release history ==
Region	Date	Format(s)	Label	Ref.
Japan	November 19, 1993	CD; cassette	Pony Canyon	
Japan	December 1, 1993	APO-CD	Pony Canyon	
Japan	May 20, 1994	MiniDisc	Pony Canyon	
Korea	February 6, 2004	CD	Pony Canyon Korea	
