= Shizuka Kudo Best =

Greatest hits album by Shizuka Kudo
- Released: December 5, 2001
- Recorded: 1987–97
- Genre: Pop
- Length: 69:22
- Label: Pony Canyon

Shizuka Kudo chronology
Euro Shizuka Kudo (2000)	Shizuka Kudo Best (2001)	Jewelry Box (2002)

Shizuka Kudo Best (工藤静香(くどうしずか)ベスト, Kudo Shizuka Besuto) is the tenth compilation album by Japanese singer Shizuka Kudo. It was released on December 5, 2001, through Pony Canyon. The album is part of the label's greatest hits series My Kore!ction. It was later released digitally on July 1, 2012. An abridged version of the compilation, as per the My Kore!Lite series, was released on May 19, 2010. All sixteen songs were remastered digitally for the album. The My Kore!Lite edition was re-released on June 15, 2016 in Ultimate HQCD (UHQCD) format.

== Commercial performance ==
Shizuka Kudo Best did not chart in the top 300 of the Oricon Albums Chart. However, the album has done well digitally since being released for download in 2012; it ranked as high as number 2 on the Recochoku Weekly Albums chart. The album ranked at number three on the Recochoku Monthly Albums chart, both in September 2014 and March 2015. It has steadily scored a spot on the Recochoku Year-end Albums chart, appearing on the yearly chart for four consecutive years: at number 15 in 2014, peaking at number 11 in 2015, at number 20 in 2016, and ranking at number 59 in 2017. Shizuka Kudo Best charted at number 23 on the Billboard Japan Hot Albums chart in March 2016.

== Track listing ==
My Kore!ction edition
No.	Title	Writer(s)	Arranger(s)	Length
1.	"Kindan no Telepathy"	Yasushi Akimoto; Tsugutoshi Gotō	Gotō	3:47
2.	"Daite Kuretara Ii no ni"	Gorō Matsui; Gotō	Gotō	5:06
3.	"Fu-ji-tsu"	Miyuki Nakajima; Gotō	Gotō	3:47
4.	"Mugon... Iroppoi"	Nakajima; Gotō	Gotō	3:54
5.	"Koi Hitoyo"	Matsui; Gotō	Gotō	4:31
6.	"Arashi no Sugao"	Yoshiko Miura; Gotō	Gotō	3:32
7.	"Kōsa ni Fukarete"	Nakajima; Gotō	Gotō	3:50
8.	"Kuchibiru Kara Biyaku"	Matsui; Gotō	Draw4	3:57
9.	"Senryū no Shizuku"	Aeri; Gotō	Draw4	4:41
10.	"Boya Boya Dekinai"	Matsui; Gotō	Gotō	3:40
11.	"Metamorphose"	Matsui; Gotō	Gotō; Satoshi Kadokura	4:15
12.	"Mechakucha ni Naite Shimaitai"	Matsui; Gotō	Gotō; Kadokura	4:59
13.	"Dōkoku"	Nakajima; Gotō	Gotō; Naoki Takao	4:47
14.	"Blue Rose"	Aeri; Takashi Tsushimi	Taisuke Sawachika	4:41
15.	"Ice Rain"	Aeri; Tsushimi	Kadokura	6:02
16.	"Blue Velvet"	Aeri; Hatake	Hatake	3:53
Total length:				69:22

My Kore!Lite edition
No.	Title	Writer(s)	Arranger(s)	Length
1.	"Kindan no Telepathy"	Akimoto; Gotō	Gotō	3:48
2.	"Again"	Akimoto; Gotō	Gotō	4:16
3.	"Daite Kuretara Ii no ni"	Matsui; Gotō	Gotō	5:07
4.	"Fu-ji-tsu"	Nakajima; Gotō	Gotō	3:48
5.	"Mugon... Iroppoi"	Nakajima; Gotō	Gotō	3:54
6.	"Koi Hitoyo"	Matsui; Gotō	Gotō	4:32
7.	"Arashi no Sugao"	Yoshiko Miura; Gotō	Gotō	3:31
8.	"Kōsa ni Fukarete"	Nakajima; Gotō	Gotō	3:50
9.	"Kuchibiru Kara Biyaku"	Matsui; Gotō	Draw4	3:57
10.	"Metamorphose"	Matsui; Gotō	Gotō; Kadokura	4:15
11.	"Dōkoku"	Nakajima; Gotō	Gotō; Takao	4:49
12.	"Gekijō"	Nakajima	Ichizō Seo	4:37
Total length:				50:28

== Charts ==
Chart (2001–16)	Peak position
Japan Hot Albums (Billboard)	23
Japan Daily Albums (Recochoku)	1
Japan Weekly Albums (Recochoku)	2
Japan Monthly Albums (Recochoku)	3
Japan Yearly Albums (Recochoku)	11

== Release history ==
=== My Kore!ction edition ===
Region	Date	Format(s)	Label	Ref.
Japan	December 5, 2001	CD	Pony Canyon	
Various	July 1, 2012	Digital download	Pony Canyon	

=== My Kore!Lite edition ===
Region	Date	Format(s)	Label	Ref.
Japan	May 19, 2010	CD	Pony Canyon	
Japan	July 1, 2012	UHQCD	Pony Canyon	
