= Rin (album) =

Studio album by Shizuka Kudo
- Released: August 30, 2017
- Recorded: 2015–17
- Genre: Pop; rock
- Length: 39:07
- Label: Pony Canyon
- Producer: Shizuka Kudo

Shizuka Kudo chronology
My Heartful Best: Gorō Matsui Collection (2016)	Rin (2017)

Rin (凛(りん); lit. "Dignified") is the seventeenth studio album by Japanese singer Shizuka Kudo. It was released a day shy of Kudo's 30th anniversary, on August 30, 2017, through Pony Canyon. The album marks Kudo's first studio album in over twelve years and includes nine original songs written by Japanese singer-songwriters Koji Tamaki, Tak Matsumoto and Kaori Kishitani, among others. it also features various collaborations with veteran songwriters, including lyricist Gorō Matsui, a long-time collaborator of Kudo's, as well as with new talent, such as Niconico utaite Mafumafu, the singer-songwriter duo Yoshida Yamada and first-time songwriter and author Shizuka Ijūin, while Kudo serves as the album's executive producer.

The album was released in two versions: a standard edition and a limited, first press edition, which comes with two DVDs including 34 of Kudo's earlier music videos as well as three new ones for the songs "Hagane no Mori", "Kasumisō", and "Kinki to Tsukiakari".

It charted at number 21 on the Oricon Albums Chart, marking Kudo's highest-charting studio album in close to twenty years, since I'm Not (1999).

== Background ==
Kudo announced the release of Rin via a press release on July 28, 2017. It is her first studio album in twelve years, since Tsukikage. Kudo explained in an interview with Yahoo! Japan that she decided two years prior to the album's release that she wanted to create an album of new, original material for her fans to mark her 30th anniversary as a solo singer. The singer told Yahoo: "As a token of my gratitude to my loyal fans, I wanted to create every song on the record from scratch." Despite Pony Canyon executives floating around the idea of possibly throwing older songs into the mix, Kudo declined, insisting on only presenting new songs to her audience.

== Writing and composition ==
On her collaboration with B'z guitarist Tak Matsumoto on the song "Mitsu to Toge", Kudo explains that during the writing process for the album, she had recalled Matsumoto casually promising, roughly twenty years prior, to compose a song for her. When she reconnected with Matsumoto, she asked him for a "manly" hard rock song, which she reveals to Yahoo, is her favorite musical genre. She originally was going to write the lyrics to go along with the resulting track, but changed her mind and tasked author Shizuka Ijūin, whom she had met at a prior work function, to write them instead.

For the album, Kudo recorded "Junk", a song written by her longtime friend, Princess Princess vocalist Kaori Kishitani. Kudo tells Yahoo that Kishitani presented her with four different songs and let her pick her favorite. Kishitani then asked her what kind of lyrics she had in mind for the track she picked, to which Kudo replied she wanted the song's message to be about "down-to-earth living". Kishitani created an assertive anthem that Kudo was thrilled to record, stating: "you can't behave like I do on this song in real life."

Kudo worked with guitarist and longtime collaborator Taisuke Sawachika on the song "Dōse Nara". She refers to the song as one of the album's "standout" tracks; according to Kudo, she was drawn to the song because of its "cool factor". She singled out the opening line of the first chorus Sawachika wrote, and the "mouthful" of lyrics she sings throughout the song, as its most impressive aspects.

"Hotori", co-written by Gorō Matsui and Koji Tamaki, came about because Kudo specifically requested the two collaborate on a song together. She explained to Yahoo: "I was curious to find out what [Tamaki]'s songs would sound like sung by a woman." Kudo wanted the song to evoke a sensation of floating and was pleased that Matsui's sparse lyrics didn't include any situating details.

Kudo wrote the lyrics for "Hagane no Mori", one of the more pop-sounding tracks of the record, with the intention of creating a fight song for herself and her fans. The song is about seeing the light at the end of the tunnel when the world seems bleak. She further explained to Yahoo: "I wanted to sing from a hopeful point of view and to let the listener know that, when you feel like you're struggling to move in a bottomless pit of mud, you don't have to sink in the dark, but you can instead move towards the future ahead." Kudo admits even she got teary-eyed writing the song. The song was composed by Kudo's 14-year-old daughter, Kōki. She also worked on the nostalgic "Kasumisō". Kudo recalled: "When I first read the title, an image of fluttering cherry blossoms came to mind. It was a very Japonesque visual, especially when matched with the striking opening notes of the song." She discussed with Kōki about altering the song to fit that initial image, and together they came up with a track that would be complemented by Kudo's higher vocal register. Kudo was struck with the idea to work with younger songwriters like Kōki about a decade prior, stating that on previous records she had been more stubborn about her vision, but that lately she had come to value the opinions of the younger generation of musicians. The backing harmonies during the verses are one of the ideas suggested by Kōki that Kudo felt she had to incorporate into the song.

Mafumafu of the band After the Rain wrote "Kinki to Tsukiakari". "He explained the song to me very politely," Kudo reveals of her first interaction with Mafumafu. "He's very particular with word choice and the overall message of the song," she adds, stating that his earnestness made her want to give it her all during the recording of the song. Kudo explained that despite its pop melody, the creative process for the song was different from the usual pop song. She noted that Mafumafu was more introspective than songwriters from her generation. She channeled her inner introvert when recording "Kinki to Tsukiakari" which she said was the correct approach for the song.

Yoshida Yamada, a duo consisting of singer-songwriters Yui Yoshida and Yoshitaka Yamada, wrote the penultimate ballad "Hari". Speaking on the song, Kudo states: "The words and the music are lovely. It's not just a sad song, it has a sympathetic core. I love it." She noted that the song is very true to character to Yoshida Yamada, whom she described as two gentle and considerate artists. The album closes with the powerful ballad "Time After Time", written by Matsui and composed by Kōki. Kudo points out that it has an unusual type of composition and refers to the song as a challenge. She chose it to be the closing track because she was very fond of the very last lyric: "fukaku atatakai kono negai", which loosely translates to "this deep heartfelt wish".

== Artwork ==
The cover art for the album's standard and limited editions were both photographed by Kazumi Kurigami. The standard edition cover features Kudo wearing her own hand-made jewelry and striking a "dignified" pose, which is meant to evoke "progress and defiance". About her decision to have Kurigami shoot the cover, Kudo stated: "I decided a long time ago that Kurigami would immortalize all the big moments of my career." She explained that Rin is the album that ignited her desire to keep creating new music, a similar resolve she experienced when she completed the recording sessions for her debut album, Mysterious.

== Promotion ==
On August 2, 2017, Kudo appeared on the annual CX music show FNS Uta no Natsu Matsuri, where she performed her song "Arashi no Sugao" with longtime friends and fellow singers Chisato Moritaka and Kaori Kishitani. On September 1, 2017, she appeared on the AX variety show Buzzrhythm where she was interviewed and performed the Mafumafu-penned "Kinki to Tsukiakari" off the album. On September 14, 2017, Kudo performed a medley of hit songs, and "Hagane no Mori" from Rin, on a special episode of NHK's music show Songs as well as being interviewed by columnist Gō Yoshida. On September 30, 2017, she appeared on CX music show Music Fair and performed "Hagane no Mori" to promote Rin, as well as other songs with fellow guests, Sukima Switch and Dream Ami. The song "Dōse Nara" was used as the ending theme to the AX morning show Pon!.

=== Promotional singles ===
Kudo released three songs off the album, spread out over three consecutive weeks, as promotional singles to the official Pony Canyon YouTube channel, each accompanied by a music video created by Pixiv artists. On August 4, 2017, she released a short version of the music video for "Kinki to Tsukiakari" on the YouTube channel as the first promotional single for Rin. The music video features artwork by artist Aren and was animated by Kei Inagaki, otherwise known as Ke-sanβ. On August 11, 2017, the music video for the Kudo-penned "Hagane no Mori" was published on the channel. The artwork for the music video was created by Kon'iro. and the video was animated by Makino Sena. A third and last music video for the song "Kasumisō" was released a week later, on August 14, 2017, also animated by Makino Sena and featuring artwork by user Hachimitsu Honey.

=== Tour ===
To commemorate the release of Rin and to celebrate her 30th anniversary, Kudo announced a three-date Zepp hall tour for September 2017, marking her first tour in five years. All three dates were sold out. She performed 31 songs, her longest set ever, to an audience of 1,200 people on each date.

== Commercial performance ==
Rin entered the daily Oricon Albums Chart at number 12. It peaked on the daily chart the following day at number 11. It debuted at number 21 on the weekly Oricon Albums Chart, with 3,000 copies sold, marking Kudo's highest-charting studio album in close to twenty years, since I'm Not.

== Track listing ==
Rin CD
No.	Title	Writer(s)	Arranger(s)	Length
1.	"Hagane no Mori" (鋼の森, "Forest of Steel")	Aeri; Kōki	Taisuke Sawachika	4:55
2.	"Kasumisō" (かすみ草, "Baby's Breath")	Aeri; Kōki	Sawachika	4:50
3.	"Mitsu to Toge" (蜜と棘, "Honey and Thorns")	Shizuka Ijūin; Tak Matsumoto	Yukihide "YT" Takiyama	4:03
4.	"Junk"	Kaori Kishitani; Kimura Uni	Naoki Itai	2:37
5.	"Hotori" (ほとり, "Nearby")	Gorō Matsui; Koji Tamaki	Akihisa Matsūra	4:42
6.	"Kinki to Tsukiakari" (禁忌と月明かり, "Taboo and the Moonlight")	Mafumafu	Mafumafu; Zenkō Mitsuya	4:04
7.	"Hari" (針, "Needle")	Yoshida Yamada	Keiichi Wakui	5:10
8.	"Dōse Nara" (どうせなら, "If")	Sawachika	Matsūra	4:02
9.	"Time After Time"	Matsui; Kōki	Sawachika	4:41
Total length:				39:07

Rin DVD – Disc 1
No.	Title	Length
1.	"Metamorphose"
2.	"Again"
3.	"Boya Boya Dekinai"
4.	"Please"
5.	"Mechakucha ni Naite Shimaitai"
6.	"Senryū no Shizuku"
7.	"Urahara"
8.	"Koe o Kikasete"
9.	"Dōkoku"
10.	"Watashi wa Knife"
11.	"Anata Shika Inai Desho"
12.	"Blue Rose"
13.	"Jaguar Line"
14.	"Naked Love"
15.	"Yume" (夢, "Dream")
16.	"Ice Rain"
17.	"Moon Water"
18.	"Sagisō" (さぎ草, "Fringed Orchid")
19.	"7"

Rin DVD – Disc 2
No.	Title	Director(s)	Length
1.	"Chō"
2.	"Yū"
3.	"Gekijō"
4.	"Blue Velvet"	Masashi Mutō
5.	"Kama Sutra no Densetsu"	Mutō
6.	"Setsu Getsu Ka"	Mutō
7.	"Kirara"	Mutō
8.	"Isshun"	Mutō
9.	"Blue Zone"	Mutō
10.	"Lotus (Umareshi Hana)"
11.	"Kokoro no Chikara"
12.	"Clāvis (Kagi)"
13.	"Amayo no Tsuki ni"	Takahiro Kiyosue
14.	"Night Wing"	Kiyosue
15.	"Yukigasa"
16.	"Hagane no Mori"	Ke-sanβ
17.	"Kasumisō"	Makino Sena
18.	"Kinki to Tsukiakari"	Sena

== Charts ==
Chart (2017)	Peak position
Japan Daily Albums (Oricon)	11
Japan Weekly Albums (Oricon)	21
Japan Hot Albums (Billboard)	30
Japan Top Albums Sales (Billboard)	16

== Release history ==
Region	Date	Format(s)	Label	Ref.
Japan	August 30, 2017	CD; digital download	Pony Canyon	
Various	August 30, 2017	Digital download; streaming	Pony Canyon	
