= My Heartful Best: Gorō Matsui Collection =

Compilation album by Shizuka Kudo
- Released: March 9, 2016
- Genre: Pop
- Length: 135:29
- Label: Pony Canyon

Shizuka Kudo chronology
My Treasure Best: Miyuki Nakajima × Tsugutoshi Gotō Collection (2015)	My Heartful Best: Gorō Matsui Collection (2016)	Rin (2017)

My Heartful Best: Gorō Matsui Collection (My Heartful Best ～松井五郎(まついごろう)コレクション～, My Heartful Best: Matsui Gorō Korekushon) is the fourteenth compilation album by Japanese singer Shizuka Kudo. It was released on March 9, 2016, through Pony Canyon. It features three discs-worth of songs co-written by lyricist Gorō Matsui, ranging from Kudo's greatest hit singles to album tracks to recent compositions. The record also includes the unreleased track "Without Your Love" as well as a new song entitled "Yuragi no Tsuki".

== Background ==
My Heartful Best: Gorō Matsui Collection is a compilation album featuring songs with lyrics written by Gorō Matsui released throughout Kudo's career. It includes a total of twenty-eight songs, from the late eighties all the way up to newly recorded material. On the first disc, dubbed "Bloom", the last track, "Without Your Love", is a previous recorded song that is being released for the first time. It was penned by Matsui and composed by Tsugutoshi Gotō. The song was originally recorded in 1993 and was in contention to be released as a single, instead of the song "Anata Shika Inai Desho", but the idea was shelved. During the album's promotion, Kudo performed the song on the EX music show Music Station, marking her first appearance on the program in fourteen years. A new song was also recorded for the compilation, titled "Yuragi no Tsuki", and included on the third disc, dubbed "Crescent". The song is written by Matsui and composed by Toshiaki Matsumoto. "Yuragi no Tsuki" was used as ending theme to the TBS morning show Hiruobi! to promote the album.

== Commercial performance ==
My Heartful Best: Gorō Matsui Collection entered the daily Oricon Albums Chart at number 21, where it also peaked. It debuted on the weekly chart at number 38, selling 2,000 copies. The album charted for four consecutive weeks in the top 300, selling a reported total 3,000 of copies.

== Track listing ==
All lyrics written by Gorō Matsui.

Disc 1 – Bloom
No.	Title	Music	Arranger(s)	Length
1.	"Daite Kuretara Ii no ni"	Tsugutoshi Gotō	Gotō	5:06
2.	"Koi Hitoyo"	Gotō	Gotō	4:31
3.	"Chotto Shita Guilty" (ちょっとしたGUILTY, "Slightly Guilty")	Gotō	Gotō	5:15
4.	"Metamorphose"	Gotō	Gotō	4:15
5.	"Kuchibiru Kara Biyaku"	Gotō	Draw4	3:57
6.	"Kimi ga Tsubasa o Hirogeru Toki" (きみが翼をひろげるとき, "When You Spread Your Wings")	Gotō	Gotō; Naoki Takao	5:56
7.	"Anata Shika Inai Desho"	Gotō	Gotō; Satoshi Kadokura; Takao	6:25
8.	"Shinkaigyo" (深海魚, "Deep-sea Fish")	Jin Nakamura	Nakamura	4:03
9.	"Without Your Love"	Gotō	Gotō	5:45
Total length:				45:16

Disc 2 – Aqua
No.	Title	Music	Arranger(s)	Length
1.	"Tenshi Mitai ni Odorasete" (天使みたいに踊らせて, "Handle Me Like an Angel")	Gotō	Gotō	4:27
2.	"Boya Boya Dekinai"	Gotō	Gotō	3:41
3.	"Mirage no Toriko" (Mirageの虜, "Captive to a Mirage")	Gotō	Draw4	3:58
4.	"Baroque Pearl" (バロックパール, Barokku Pāru)	Reo	Reo	3:42
5.	"Non-Stop"	Gotō	Gotō	3:52
6.	"Totemo Chiisana Shōshin" (とても小さな傷心, "Tiny Heartbreak")	Gotō	Gotō	2:59
7.	"Watashi wa Knife"	Gotō	Gotō; Kadokura; Takao	4:27
8.	"Urahara"	Gotō	Gotō	4:54
9.	"Sayonara Lonely Korekkiri Lonely" (さよならLONELY これっきりLONELY, "Goodbye, Lonely, This Once, Lonely")	Gotō	Gotō	5:13
Total length:				37:16

Disc 3 – Crescent
No.	Title	Music	Arranger(s)	Length
1.	"Wine Hitokuchi no Uso" (ワインひとくちの嘘, "Lying After One Sip of Wine")	Gotō	Gotō	4:51
2.	"X'mas ga Ippai" (X'masがいっぱい, "Plenty of X'mas")	Gotō	Gotō	4:48
3.	"Moonlight no Sei Janai" (MOONLIGHTのせいじゃない, "Not the Moonlight's Fault")	Gotō	Draw4	5:27
4.	"Natsu ga Kureta Miracle" (夏がくれたミラクル, Natsu ga Kureta Mirakuru, "A Summer Miracle")	Gotō	Gotō	3:59
5.	"Serenade" (セレナーデ, Serenāde)	Gotō	Gotō	5:01
6.	"Suterareta Neko Janai Kara" (捨てられた猫じゃないから, "I'm Not an Abandoned Cat")	Gotō	Gotō	7:42
7.	"Mechakucha ni Naite Shimaitai"	Gotō	Gotō; Kadokura	4:59
8.	"Koe o Kikasete"	Gotō	Gotō; Kadokura; Takao	6:36
9.	"Sonzai" (存在, "Existence")	H-Wonder	H-Wonder	4:43
10.	"Yasuragi no Tsuki" (ゆらぎの月, "Wavering Moon")	Toshiaki Matsumoto	Taisuke Sawachika	4:46
Total length:				52:57

== Charts ==
Chart (2016)	Peak position
Japan Daily Albums (Oricon)	21
Japan Weekly Albums (Oricon)	38
Japan Hot Albums (Billboard)	60
Japan Top Albums Sales (Billboard)	32
