= Unlimited (Shizuka Kudo album) =

Compilation album by Shizuka Kudo
- Released: November 14, 1990
- Recorded: 1989–91
- Genre: Pop
- Length: 50:41
- Label: Pony Canyon

Shizuka Kudo chronology
Rosette (1990)	Unlimited (1990)	Mind Universe (1991)

Unlimited (stylized as unlimited) is the third compilation album by Japanese singer Shizuka Kudo. It was released on November 14, 1990, through Pony Canyon. The album features all original recordings of the singles released from "Koi Hitoyo" (1988) through "Watashi ni Tsuite" (1990), as well as reworked versions with new vocal takes of Kudo's first batch of singles, from "Kindan no Telepathy" through "Mugon... Iroppoi". The album also includes a new song, entitled "Koi Moyō", co-written by Kudo herself, under the pseudonym Aeri, specifically for the album.

== Commercial performance ==
Unlimited debuted at number two on the Oricon Albums Chart, with 134,000 units sold. It dropped three positions to number five on its second week, with 66,000 copies sold. It slid to number six the following week, selling 39,000 copies. The album held onto the top ten for another week, sliding to number nine and selling 29,000 copies. Unlimited spent another six non-consecutive weeks in the top twenty. It charted for a total of eighteen weeks in the top 100, logging sales of 454,000 copies during its run. Unlimited ranked at number 97 on the year-end Oricon Albums Chart for 1990 and peaked on the chart at number 53 in 1991.

== Track listing ==
All music is composed by Tsugutoshi Gotō.

No.	Title	Lyrics	Arranger(s)	Length
1.	"Kindan no Telepathy" (Vocal New Version)	Yasushi Akimoto	Tsugutoshi Gotō	3:55
2.	"Again" (Vocal New Version)	Akimoto	Gotō	4:14
3.	"Daite Kuretara Ii no ni" (Vocal New Version)	Gorō Matsui	Gotō	5:15
4.	"Fu-ji-tsu" (Vocal New Version)	Miyuki Nakajima	Gotō	4:02
5.	"Mugon... Iroppoi" (Vocal New Version)	Nakajima	Gotō	3:54
6.	"Koi Hitoyo"	Matsui	Gotō	4:31
7.	"Arashi no Sugao"	Yoshiko Miura	Gotō	3:31
8.	"Kōsa ni Fukarete"	Nakajima	Gotō	3:49
9.	"Kuchibiru Kara Biyaku"	Matsui	Draw4	3:56
10.	"Senryū no Shizuku"	Aeri	Draw4	4:42
11.	"Watashi ni Tsuite"	Nakajima	Draw4	4:07
12.	"Koi Moyō" (恋模様, "Sign of Love")	Aeri	Draw4	4:45
Total length:				50:41

== Charts ==
Chart (1990–91)	Peak position
Japan Weekly Albums (Oricon)	2
Japan Yearly Albums (Oricon)	53

== Certification ==
Region	Certification	Certified units/sales
Japan (RIAJ)	Platinum	454,000

== Release history ==
Region	Date	Format(s)	Label	Ref.
Japan	November 14, 1990	CD; cassette	Pony Canyon	
Various	March 9, 2016	Digital download	Pony Canyon	

== See also ==
- 1990 in Japanese music
