= My Treasure Best: Miyuki Nakajima × Tsugutoshi Gotō Collection =

Compilation album by Shizuka Kudo
- Released: February 18, 2015
- Recorded: 1988–2014
- Genre: Pop
- Length: 80:25
- Label: Pony Canyon

Shizuka Kudo chronology
My Precious: Shizuka Sings Songs of Miyuki (2008)	My Treasure Best: Miyuki Nakajima × Tsugutoshi Gotō Collection (2015)	My Heartful Best: Gorō Matsui Collection (2016)

My Treasure Best: Miyuki Nakajima × Tsugutoshi Gotō Collection (My Treasure Best -中島(なかじま)みゆき×後藤(ごとう)次利(つぐとし)コレクション-, My Treasure Best: Nakajima Miyuki × Gotō Tsugutoshi Korekushon) is the thirteenth compilation album by Japanese singer Shizuka Kudo. It was released on February 18, 2015, through Pony Canyon. It was released as a high-resolution digital download one week in advance, on February 11, 2015, on the music store Mora.

The album features all the songs co-written by Miyuki Nakajima and Tsugutoshi Gotō Kudo has released since her debut album. It also includes a new song, "Tan Jun Ai vs Hontō no Ai", which was recorded specifically for the album.

== Background ==
My Treasure Best: Miyuki Nakajima × Tsugutoshi Gotō Collection is a compilation album featuring songs co-written by Miyuki Nakajima and Tsugutoshi Gotō released by Kudo throughout her career. It includes seventeen songs, spread out over two discs, ranging from their first collaboration, "Fu-ji-tsu" (1988), all the way to "Tanin no Machi" and "Sono Ato wa Ame no Naka", from the album Rise Me (1993). The compilation also includes a new song; Nakajima and Gotō co-wrote "Tan Jun Ai vs Hontō no Uso", which Kudo recorded for the album and is included as a bonus track. The song marks the first collaboration between the three of them in twenty-two years. During a talk show organized by Tsutaya to promote the album, Kudo explained that, when Nakajima handed her the lyrics to the song, she made sure to specify that the proper pronunciation for the abbreviated "vs" in the song's title is "vee ess" and not "versus".

== Commercial performance ==
My Treasure Best: Miyuki Nakajima × Tsugutoshi Gotō Collection entered the daily Oricon Albums Chart at number 19, where it also peaked. It debuted on the weekly chart at number 22, selling 6,000 copies. The album charted in the top 300 for a total of seven consecutive weeks, selling a reported total of 13,000 during its run.

== Track listing ==
All lyrics written by Miyuki Nakajima; all tracks composed and arranged by Tsugutoshi Gotō, except where noted.

Disc 1
No.	Title	Length
1.	"Fu-ji-tsu"	3:48
2.	"Shōko o Misete" (証拠をみせて, "Show Me Proof")	4:35
3.	"Sayonara no Gyakusetsu" (さよならの逆説, "The Paradox of Goodbye")	4:15
4.	"Brilliant White" (ブリリアント・ホワイト, Buririanto Howaito)	5:14
5.	"Hadashi no Lion" (裸爪のライオン, "Bareclawed Lion")	5:12
6.	"Mugon... Iroppoi"	3:54
7.	"Gunshū" (群衆, "Crowd")	4:30
8.	"Kōsa ni Fukarete"	3:50
9.	"Akiko" (秋子)	3:55
Total length:		39:31

Disc 2
No.	Title	Arranger(s)	Length
1.	"Watashi ni Tsuite"	Draw4	4:08
2.	"Tel..Me"	Draw4	4:02
3.	"Tsugihagi no Portrait" (つぎはぎのポートレイト, Tsugihagi no Pōtoreito, "Patched Up Portrait")		4:37
4.	"Embrace"		4:32
5.	"Dōkoku"		4:48
6.	"Call" (コール, Kōru)		4:33
7.	"Tanin no Machi" (他人の街, "Town of Strangers")		4:27
8.	"Sono Ato wa Ame no Naka" (そのあとは雨の中, "Afterwards, in the Rain")	Gotō; Naoki Takao	5:10
9.	"Tan Jun Ai vs Hontō no Uso" (単・純・愛 vs 本当の嘘, "Simple Love vs A Real Lie")	Akihisa Matsūra	4:33
Total length:			40:54

== Charts ==
Chart (2015)	Peak position
Japan Daily Albums (Oricon)	19
Japan Weekly Albums (Oricon)	22
Japan Top Albums Sales (Billboard)	18
Japan Monthly Albums (Mora)	33
