= Best of Ballade: Empathy =

Compilation album by Shizuka Kudo
- Released: November 20, 1992
- Recorded: 1988–92
- Genre: Pop
- Length: 53:22
- Label: Pony Canyon

Shizuka Kudo chronology
Trinity (1992)	Best of Ballade: Empathy (1992)	Rise Me (1993)

Best of Ballade: Empathy is the fifth compilation album by Japanese singer Shizuka Kudo. It was released on November 20, 1992, through Pony Canyon. It is Kudo's first ballad collection, followed by Best of Ballade: Current in 1998. Half of the album is made up of ballads from previously released studio albums while the other half features new songs recorded for the album as well as unreleased ballads co-written by Kudo, under the pseudonym Aeri.

== Commercial performance ==
Best of Ballade: Empathy debuted at number six on the Oricon Albums Chart, with 92,000 units sold. It dropped three positions to number nine on its second week, selling 37,000 copies. The album charted in the top 100 for eight consecutive weeks, selling a reported total of 180,000 copies during its chart run.

== Track listing ==
No.	Title	Writer(s)	Arranger(s)	Length
1.	"Koe o Kikasete"	Gorō Matsui; Tsugutoshi Gotō	Gotō; Satoshi Kadokura	6:35
2.	"Kanojo Kara..." (彼女から…, "From Her...")	Aeri	Gotō	4:51
3.	"Mirai no Takara" (未来の宝, "Future Treasure")	Aeri; Gotō	Gotō	4:57
4.	"Garasu no Sanctuary" (硝子のサンクチュアリ, Garasu no Sankuchuari, "Glass Sanctuary")	Shintarō Hirai; Gotō	Gotō	3:53
5.	"Kizuna" (絆, "Bond")	Aeri; Gotō	Gotō	5:43
6.	"Ki no Nai Lullaby" (気のないララバイ, Ki no Nai Rarabai, "Halfhearted Lullaby")	Aeri; Gotō	Gotō	4:52
7.	"Gunshū" (群衆, "Crowd")	Miyuki Nakajima; Gotō	Gotō	4:29
8.	"Mizuumi" (みずうみ, "Lake")	Kumiko Yoshizawa; Gotō	Gotō; Kadokura; Hiroaki Sugawara	4:13
9.	"Forever"	Aeri; Gotō	Gotō	4:21
10.	"Mechakucha ni Naite Shimaitai"	Matsui; Gotō	Gotō; Kadokura	5:00
11.	"X'mas Night"	Aeri	Nobuo Kurata	4:28
Total length:				53:22

== Charts ==
Chart (1992)	Peak position
Japan Weekly Albums (Oricon)	6

== Certification ==
Region	Certification	Certified units/sales
Japan (RIAJ)	Gold	200,000^{^}
^{^} Shipments figures based on certification alone.

== Release history ==
Region	Date	Format(s)	Label	Ref.
Japan	November 20, 1992	CD; cassette	Pony Canyon	
Various	March 9, 2016	Digital download	Pony Canyon	
