= Trinity (Shizuka Kudo album) =

Studio album by Shizuka Kudo
- Released: March 18, 1992
- Genre: Pop
- Length: 53:09
- Label: Pony Canyon
- Producer: Yūzō Watanabe

Shizuka Kudo chronology
Intimate (1991)	Trinity (1992)	Best of Ballade: Empathy (1992)

Singles from Trinity
- 1. "Mechakucha ni Naite Shimaitai" Released: January 29, 1992

Trinity is the seventh studio album by Japanese singer Shizuka Kudo. It was released on March 18, 1992, through Pony Canyon. Trinity is Kudo's last album to be produced by Tsugutoshi Gotō. It yielded Kudo the single, "Mechakucha ni Naite Shimaitai", which became one of Kudo's signature ballads. The album also includes one of Kudo's longest recorded songs, the album closer "Suterareta Neko Janai Kara", which runs for over seven minutes.

== Commercial performance ==
Trinity debuted at number three on the Oricon Albums Chart, with 99,000 units sold in its first week. The album dropped eight positions to number eleven on its second week, with 41,000 copies sold. It dropped to number nineteen the following week, selling 15,000 copies. Trinity spent nine consecutive weeks in the top 100, selling a reported total of 200,000 copies during its run, and ranked at number 91 on the year-end Oricon Albums Chart.

== Track listing ==
All tracks composed and arranged by Tsugutoshi Gotō, except "Mechakucha ni Naite Shimaitai" arranged by Gotō and Satoshi Kadokura.

No.	Title	Lyrics	Length
1.	"Mechakucha ni Naite Shimaitai"	Gorō Matsui	4:59
2.	"Moonlight no Sei Janai" (MOONLIGHTのせいじゃない, "Not the Moonlight's Fault")	Matsui	5:26
3.	"My Eyes"	Yoshiko Miura	4:55
4.	"Anata no Inai Keshiki" (あなたのいない風景, "A View Without You")	Yoshihiko Andō	5:28
5.	"Magic" (マジック, Majikku)	Aeri	4:21
6.	"News no Naka no Seishun" (ニュースの中の青春, Nyūsu no Naka no Seishun, "Youth in the News")	Andō	5:49
7.	"Kiri no Kanata e" (霧の彼方へ, "Beyond the Fog")	Miura	4:16
8.	"Futari ni Sasete" (ふたりにさせて, "Make It Two")	Chinfa Kan	5:12
9.	"Tasogare ga Yoru ni Naru" (黄昏が夜になる, "When Dusk Turns to Night")	Sayako Morimoto	5:04
10.	"Suterareta Neko Janai Kara" (捨てられた猫じゃないから, "I'm Not an Abandoned Cat")	Matsui	7:39
Total length:			53:09

== Charts ==
Chart (1992)	Peak position
Japan Weekly Albums (Oricon)	3
Japan Yearly Albums (Oricon)	91

== Certification ==
Region	Certification	Certified units/sales
Japan (RIAJ)	Gold	200,000

== Release history ==
Region	Date	Format(s)	Label	Ref.
Japan	March 18, 1992	CD; cassette	Pony Canyon	
Japan	December 1, 1993	APO-CD	Pony Canyon	
Various	February 4, 2015	Digital download	Pony Canyon	
