= Rosette (album) =

Studio album by Shizuka Kudo
- Released: April 4, 1990
- Genre: Pop soul
- Length: 38:46
- Label: Pony Canyon
- Producer: Yūzō Watanabe

Shizuka Kudo chronology
Harvest (1989)	Rosette (1990)	Unlimited (1990)

Singles from Rosette
- 1. "Kuchibiru Kara Biyaku" Released: January 10, 1990

Rosette is the fifth studio album by Japanese singer Shizuka Kudo. It was released on April 4, 1990, through Pony Canyon. Initially titled Mysterious II, Rosette is Kudo's first album to be entirely arranged by Tsugutoshi Gotō and his band members, credited under the name Draw4. The limited first pressing of the album came in a special box packaging. Rosette was re-released in APO-CD format on December 1, 1993.

== Commercial performance ==
Rosette debuted at number one on the Oricon Albums Chart, with 125,000 copies sold in its first week. The album dropped to number two the following week, with 44,000 copies sold. It fell eight positions to number ten on its third charting week, selling 24,000 copies. It hovered around the top ten for the following four weeks before dropping out from the top twenty on its eight charting week. Rosette stayed in the top 100 for eleven weeks, selling a reported total of 265,000 copies during its run. The album ranked at number 48 on the year-end Oricon Albums Chart.

== Track listing ==
All music composed by Tsugutoshi Gotō; all tracks arranged by Draw4.

No.	Title	Lyrics	Length
1.	"Dangai" (断崖, "Palisade")	Yoshiko Miura	4:42
2.	"Mirage no Toriko" (Mirageの虜, "Captive to a Mirage")	Gorō Matsui	3:57
3.	"Unbeliever"	Masumi Kawamura	4:48
4.	"Shunkan no Umi" (瞬間の海, "A Sea of Moments")	Masami Tozawa	4:11
5.	"Getsuyōbi no Shissō" (月曜日の失踪, "Disappeared on A Monday")	Kawamura	4:44
6.	"Kuchibiru Kara Biyaku"	Matsui	3:56
7.	"Ai no Hyōryūsha" (愛の漂流者, "Love's Castaway")	Jun Taguchi	5:43
8.	"Sunao ni Itte" (素直に言って, "Tell Me Honestly")	Aeri	6:45
Total length:			38:46

== Charts ==
Chart (1990)	Peak position
Japan Weekly Albums (Oricon)	1
Japan Yearly Albums (Oricon)	48

== Certification ==
Region	Certification	Certified units/sales
Japan (RIAJ)	Gold	265,000

== Release history ==
Region	Date	Format(s)	Label	Ref.
Japan	April 4, 1990	CD; cassette	Pony Canyon	
Japan	December 1, 1993	APO-CD	Pony Canyon	
Various	March 9, 2016	Digital download	Pony Canyon	

== See also ==
- List of Oricon number-one albums
- 1990 in Japanese music
