= Rise Me =

Studio album by Shizuka Kudo
- Released: April 1, 1993
- Genre: Pop
- Length: 47:53
- Label: Pony Canyon
- Producer: Yūzō Watanabe

Shizuka Kudo chronology
Best of Ballade: Empathy (1992)	Rise Me (1993)	Super Best (1993)

Singles from Rise Me
- 1. "Dōkoku" Released: February 3, 1993

Rise Me (stylized as Rise me) is the eighth studio album by Japanese singer Shizuka Kudo. It was released on April 1, 1993, through Pony Canyon. Rise Me is Kudo's last album to be produced by Tsugutoshi Gotō. It yielded Kudo's best-selling single, "Dōkoku".

== Commercial performance ==
Rise Me debuted at number three on the Oricon Albums Chart, with 58,000 units sold in its first week. The album dropped four positions to number seven on its second week, with 41,000 copies sold. It stayed at number seven the following week, selling 24,000 copies. Rise Me charted in the top 100 for ten weeks, selling a reported total of 183,000 copies during its run. It ranked at number 99 on the year-end Oricon Albums Chart.

== Track listing ==
All music is composed by Tsugutoshi Gotō.

No.	Title	Lyrics	Arranger(s)	Length
1.	"Sayonara Lonely Korekkiri Lonely" (さよならLONELY これっきりLONELY, "Goodbye, Lonely, This Once, Lonely")	Gorō Matsui	Tsugutoshi Gotō	5:14
2.	"Do Done"	Aeri	Gotō	4:33
3.	"Kawaita Hana" (渇いた花, "Parched Flower")	Yoshiko Miura	Gotō; Naoki Takao	4:06
4.	"Kimi ga Tsubasa o Hirogeru Toki" (きみが翼をひろげるとき, "When You Spread Your Wings")	Matsui	Gotō; Takao	5:57
5.	"Tanin no Machi" (他人の街, "Town of Strangers")	Miyuki Nakajima	Gotō	4:26
6.	"Gong"	Miura	Gotō	4:18
7.	"Kanashimi no Ocean" (悲しみのOCEAN, "Ocean of Sadness")	Fumiko Okada	Gotō; Takao	4:50
8.	"Hot Body"	Yoshihiko Andō	Gotō	4:37
9.	"Sono Ato wa Ame no Naka" (そのあとは雨の中, "Afterwards, in the Rain")	Nakajima	Gotō; Takao	5:07
10.	"Dōkoku"	Nakajima	Gotō; Takao	4:45
Total length:				47:53

== Charts ==
Chart (1993)	Peak position
Japan Weekly Albums (Oricon)	3
Japan Yearly Albums (Oricon)	99

== Certification ==
Region	Certification	Certified units/sales
Japan (RIAJ)	Gold	183,000

== Release history ==
Region	Date	Format(s)	Label	Ref.
Japan	April 1, 1993	CD; cassette	Pony Canyon	
Japan	December 1, 1993	APO-CD	Pony Canyon	
Various	March 9, 2016	Digital download	Pony Canyon	
