= A.S.A.P. (Little Kiss song) =

Single by Little Kiss
- Released: February 14, 1997
- Genre: Pop
- Length: 4:59
- Label: Pony Canyon
- Songwriter(s): Yasushi Akimoto; Tsugutoshi Gotō
- Producer(s): Tsugutoshi Gotō

Takaaki Ishibashi singles chronology
"A.S.A.P." (1997)	"Freedom" (1997)

Shizuka Kudo singles chronology
"Gekijō" (1996)	"A.S.A.P." (1997)	"Blue Velvet" (1997)

"A.S.A.P." is a song recorded by Japanese comedian Takaaki Ishibashi and Japanese singer Shizuka Kudo, under the unit name, Little Kiss, as part of an act for the AX variety show Tunnels no Nama de Daradara Ikasete!!, co-headed by Ishibashi. It was released as a single through Pony Canyon on Valentine's Day 1997. The song was featured on TV commercials for Ginza Jewelry Maki's exclusive jewelry brand Rhapsoamo.

== Background ==
The unit name Little Kiss was inspired by the names of bands popular at the time, including Every Little Thing and My Little Lover, from which the word "little" is lifted. The song was written by Yasushi Akimoto and Tsugutoshi Gotō, the latter of which produced Kudo's first eight albums. It is Kudo's first collaboration with Akimoto since he wrote the B-side to "Daite Kuretara Ii no ni".

== Live performances ==
Ishibashi and Kudo performed the song on the EX music show Music Station. Their performance is remembered most notably for their reenactment of the kissing scene from the song's music video. Their passage on the show attracted intense media attention and given the intimate nature of their act, dating rumors started circulating. In addition to performing the song on various music shows during its promotional cycle, Ishibashi was a special guest on Kudo's 1997 Dress Concert Tour, where the pair sung the song together. Unmarried at the time, Kudo performed the song with her husband-to-be, Takuya Kimura, when she appeared on the CX variety show, SMAP×SMAP.

== Chart performance ==
The single debuted at number three on the Oricon Singles Chart with 143,000 copies in its first week, marking Kudo's second consecutive top ten entry. It stayed in the top five for the next two weeks, ranking at number six and number five, respectively. The song charted for eleven consecutive weeks, and with over 400,000 copies sold, it was certified Platinum by the RIAJ and became Ishibashi's best-selling single. "A.S.A.P." ranked at number 63 on the year-end Oricon Singles Chart for 1997.

== Track listing ==
All lyrics are written by Yasushi Akimoto; all music is composed by Tsugutoshi Gotō.

No.	Title	Arranger(s)	Length
1.	"A.S.A.P."	Tsugutoshi Gotō; Yuiko Tsubokura	4:59
2.	"Fusawashī Futari" (ふさわしい2人, "Perfect Couple")	Mitsuji Horikawa; Otohiko Tahara	4:44
3.	"A.S.A.P." (Original Karaoke)	Gotō	4:59
Total length:			14:42

== Charts ==
Chart (1997)	Peak position
Japan Weekly Singles (Oricon)	3
Japan Monthly Singles (Oricon)	12
Japan Yearly Singles (Oricon)	63

== Certifications ==
Region	Certification	Certified units/sales
Japan (RIAJ)	Platinum	400,000^{^}
^{^} Shipments figures based on certification alone.
