= Meikyo Shisui =

Studio album by Shizuka Kudo
- Released: July 4, 2024
- Recorded: 2022–24
- Genre: Pop
- Length: 50:35
- Label: Pony Canyon
- Producer: Shizuka Kudo

Shizuka Kudo chronology
Kanjuu: Shizuka Kudo 35th Anniversary self-cover album (2022)	Meikyo Shisui (2024)

Meikyo Shishui (明鏡止水(めいきょしすい)) is the eighteenth studio album by Japanese singer Shizuka Kudo. It was released on July 3, 2024, through Pony Canyon.

== Background ==
Kudo had idea of composing the new original album during the production of her first self-cover album Kanjuu in 2022.

The album marks Kudo's first original studio album in over seven years and first album in over two years.

The album was released in two versions: a standard edition and a limited, first press editions, which comes with BD.

It charted at number 17 on the Oricon Albums Chart, marking Kudo's highest-charting studio album in close to twenty years, since I'm Not (1999).

=== Promotional singles ===
Kudo released three songs off the album since 2023. The first song "Yuusha no Hata" was released as a promotional single in June and in physical format in September. In August it was announced that the single would serve as a theme song to the 23rd season of the Japanese television drama "The Woman of S.R.I. ". The second song "Kousetsuran: Suki Yori Aishiteru" was released in October and been promoted on the headlines as a "collaboration ballad-single with the Sukima Switch". The third song Maru has been released in April 2024, served as a theme song to the anime television series "Ojamaru". The song makes her Anime song for the first time in 10 years. The final fourth song "Misore" was released digitally with the album cover. In the music videoclip, her daughter Koki stares here.

=== Tour ===
To commemorate the release of Meikyo Shinsui, Kudo announced a two-month concert tour "Piece of my heart" from July to September.

== Commercial performance ==
Meikyo Shinsui debuted at number 17 on the weekly Oricon Albums Chart. marking Kudo's highest-charting studio album in close to twenty years, since I'm Not.

== Track listing ==
Meikyo Shisui CD
No.	Title	Writer(s)	Length
1.	"Ice Coffee" (アイスコーヒー)	Aeri; Kōki	5:06
2.	"Kodoku na Rhapsody" (孤独なラプソディー, Lonely Rhapsody)	Aeri; Takatsugu Muramatsu	5:14
3.	"Boo"	Satori Shiraishi; Aeri	4:12
4.	"Go Easy"	Shiraishi; Aeri	2:54
5.	"Maru" (丸, "Round")	Aeri; Yōhei Hashiguchi	3:50
6.	"Kosetsuran ~Suki Yori Itoshi Teru~" (香雪蘭～好きより愛してる～)	Takuya Ohashi; Aeri	6:02
7.	"Yuusha no Hata" (勇者の旗)	Muramatsu; Aeri	4:53
8.	"Sea Glass"	Shiraishi; Aeri	4:02
9.	"I'm Ready"	Aeri; Kōki	3:58
10.	"Mizore" (霙)	Hashiguchi; Aeri]	5:15
11.	"Dai 3 Wakusei" (第3惑星)	Ohashi; Aeri	5:04
Total length:			50:35

== Release history ==
Region	Date	Format(s)	Label	Ref.
Japan	July 3, 2024	CD; digital download	Pony Canyon	
Various	July 3, 2024	Digital download; streaming	Pony Canyon	
