= Anata Shika Inai Desho =

Single by Shizuka Kudo
- Released: October 6, 1993
- Genre: Pop; rock; gospel
- Length: 6:26
- Label: Pony Canyon
- Songwriter(s): Gorō Matsui; Tsugutoshi Gotō
- Producer(s): Tsugutoshi Gotō

Shizuka Kudo singles chronology
"Watashi wa Knife" (1993)	"Anata Shika Inai Desho" (1993)	"Blue Rose" (1994)

Audio sample
- file; help

"Anata Shika Inai Desho" (あなたしかいないでしょ, lit. "You're the Only One") is a song recorded by Japanese singer Shizuka Kudo. It was released as a single through Pony Canyon on October 6, 1993. It made its first album appearance on the compilation album, Super Best, released later that same year.

== Background ==
"Anata Shika Inai Desho" was written by Gorō Matsui and composed by Tsugutoshi Gotō. It marks Kudo's tenth single, out of twenty released at the time, to be co-written by Matsui and Gotō. It is the last song with lyrics written by Matsui to be released as a single, as well as being the last track of Kudo's to be co-written and produced by Gotō, notwithstanding the novelty single "A.S.A.P." (1997).

== Composition ==
It is a slow, gospel-tinged rock ballad. Lyrically, Matsui describes a protagonist confidently professing her love and vowing to stand by her companion, whom she refers to as "the only one". The song is written in the key of G minor. Kudo's vocals span from F_{3} to D_{5}. The song kicks off with a guitar solo and incorporates a soulful brass section while also featuring a backing choir harmonizing throughout the track.

== Critical reception ==
Similarly to "Koe o Kikasete", also penned by Matsui and Gotō, the song is noted for its distinctively Western sound and southern gospel influences. Kudo was praised for the breathy tone she uses on the track.

== Chart performance ==
The single entered the Oricon Singles Chart at number ten, moving 62,000 units in its first week. It peaked at number five the following week with 59,000 copies sold. "Anata Shika Inai Desho" stayed in the top 100 for a total of seven weeks.

== Track listing ==
All lyrics are written by Gorō Matsui; all music is composed by Tsugutoshi Gotō

No.	Title	Arranger(s)	Length
1.	"Anata Shikai Inai Desho" (あなたしかいないでしょ, "You're the Only One")	Tsugutoshi Gotō	6:26
2.	"Chotto Shita Guilty" (ちょっとしたGUILTY, "Slightly Guilty")	Gotō	5:12
3.	"Anata Shikai Inai Desho" (Original Karaoke)	Gotō	6:24
Total length:			18:06

== Charts ==
Chart (1993)	Peak position
Japan Weekly Singles (Oricon)	5
Japan Monthly Singles (Oricon)	19

== Certification ==
Region	Certification	Certified units/sales
Japan (RIAJ)	Gold	200,000^{^}
^{^} Shipments figures based on certification alone.
