= Dress (Shizuka Kudo album) =

Studio album by Shizuka Kudo
- Released: March 19, 1997
- Genre: Pop; rock
- Length: 45:52
- Label: Pony Canyon
- Producer: Shizuka Kudo

Shizuka Kudo chronology
She: Best of Best (1996)	Dress (1997)	I'm Not (1998)

Singles from Dress
- 1. "Gekijō" Released: November 7, 1996

Dress (stylized as "DRESS") is the twelfth studio album by Japanese singer Shizuka Kudo. It was released on March 19, 1997, through Pony Canyon. The album features a soul and funk-infused rock sound. Musicians Chuei Yoshikawa and Tsuyoshi Kon performed instruments on the album as part of the recording band.

== Commercial performance ==
Dress debuted at number 18 on the Oricon Albums Chart, with 18,000 units sold in its first week. It charted in the top 100 for three weeks and sold a reported total of 31,000 copies during its run.

== Track listing ==
All lyrics are written by Aeri except "Gekijō" by Miyuki Nakajima.

No.	Title	Music	Arranger(s)	Length
1.	"Akai Dress" (赤いドレス, Akai Doresu, "Red Dress")	Tsukasa Nishi	Chuei Yoshikawa	2:59
2.	"Gin no Tsume" (銀の爪, "Silver Claw")	Toshiaki Matsumoto	Akihisa Matsūra	4:42
3.	"Poison Kiss"	Ichirō Terada	Chokkaku	4:44
4.	"Otayori" (おたより, "Correspondence")	Matsūra; Hiroshi Kakizaki	Matsūra	5:41
5.	"Binetsu" (微熱, "Slight Fever")	Hatake	Chokkaku	4:30
6.	"Gekijō"	Miyuki Nakajima	Ichizō Seo	4:36
7.	"Tatoeba" (例えば, "Let's Say")	Hatake	Chokkaku; Kumi Sasaki	5:14
8.	"Matenrō" (摩天楼, "Skyscraper")	Matsumoto	Matsūra	4:36
9.	"Flash Back"	Matsumoto	Taisuke Sawachika	5:38
10.	"Eternity"	Matsūra	Matsūra	2:56
Total length:				45:36

== Charts ==
Chart (1997)	Peak position	Sales
Japan Weekly Albums (Oricon)	18	31,000
