= Isshun =

Single by Shizuka Kudo
- Released: November 6, 1998
- Genre: Pop
- Length: 4:49
- Label: Pony Canyon
- Songwriter: ЯK
- Producers: ЯK; Taisuke Sawachika

Shizuka Kudo singles chronology
"Kirara" (1998)	"Isshun" (1998)	"Akashiya Sanma-san ni Kiite Minai to ne" (1999)

Audio sample
- "Isshun": file; help

"Isshun" (一瞬(いっしゅん); lit. "A Moment") is a song recorded by Japanese singer Shizuka Kudo. It was released as a single by Pony Canyon on November 6, 1998. The song served as theme song to the EX morning show Yajiuma Wide. It made its first album appearance on the compilation album, Millennium Best.

== Background ==
"Isshun" was written by Luna Sea lead vocalist, Ryuichi Kawamura, under the pseudonym ЯK. It is the second consecutive single written by Kawamura. Kudo and Kawamura had been working on an album that would be entirely produced by Kawamura, but ultimately the project was shelved. The song is composed in the key of G-sharp major and Kudo's vocals span from G_{3} to C_{5}. Lyrically, the song describes the moment one falls in love. Kudo described her own vocal performance on the track as reminiscent of her old singing style.

== Chart performance ==
The single debuted at number 29 on the Oricon Singles Chart, selling 11,000 copies in its first week. It fell ten positions to number 39 the following week, recording sales of 7,000 copies. "Isshun" charted a total of four weeks in the top 100.

== Track listing ==
All tracks are written by ЯK.

No.	Title	Arranger(s)	Length
1.	"Isshun" (一瞬, "A Moment")	Taisuke Sawachika	4:49
2.	"Piece of a Star"	Sawachika	3:54
3.	"Isshun" (Original Karaoke)	Sawachika	4:45
Total length:			13:28

== Charts ==
Chart (1998)	Peak position	Sales
Japan Weekly Singles (Oricon)	29	27,000
