= Urahara (song) =

Single by Shizuka Kudo
- Released: May 21, 1992
- Genre: Pop; rock
- Length: 4:53
- Label: Pony Canyon
- Songwriter(s): Gorō Matsui; Tsugutoshi Gotō
- Producer(s): Tsugutoshi Gotō

Shizuka Kudo singles chronology
| "Mechakucha ni Naite Shimaitai" (1992) | "Urahara" (1992) | "Koe o Kikasete" (1992) |

Audio sample
- "Urahara": file; help

"Urahara" (うらはら, lit. "Upside Down") is a song recorded by Japanese singer Shizuka Kudo. It was released as a single by Pony Canyon on May 21, 1992. The song made its first album appearance on the compilation album, Super Best.

== Background ==
The song was written by Gorō Matsui and composed and produced by Tsugutoshi Gotō, making it the third consecutive single of Kudo to be written and produced by the pair. Lyrically, it describes a protagonist struggling to confess her love which she admits is "turning my heart upside down". The song, which starts with a "freaky" guitar solo, came about when Gotō was randomly playing around with different sounds in the studio one day, fresh out of ideas for new songs. Kudo was praised for delivering vocals that matched the creativity of Gotō's melody.

== Chart performance ==
The single debuted at number five on the Oricon Singles Chart with 49,000 copies in its first week. It slid to number six on its second week, but outsold its first week sales, moving 51,000 copies. It dropped to number ten on its third charting week and was out of the top ten the following week. The single stayed in the top 100 for a total of 13 weeks and ranked at number 95 on the year-end Oricon Singles Chart.

== Track listing ==
All music is composed by Tsugutoshi Gotō

| No. | Title | Lyrics | Arranger(s) | Length |
|---|---|---|---|---|
| 1. | "Urahara" (うらはら, "Upside Down") | Gorō Matsui | Gotō | 4:53 |
| 2. | "Hatachi no Scenario" (20才のシナリオ, Hatachi no Shinario, "Scenario of a 20-year-old") | Aeri | Gotō | 5:02 |
| 3. | "Urahara" (Original Karaoke) | | Gotō | 4:51 |
| Total length: | | | | 14:46 |

== Charts ==
| Chart (1992) | Peak position |
|---|---|
| Japan Weekly Singles (Oricon) | 5 |
| Japan Monthly Singles (Oricon) | 8 |
| Japan Yearly Singles (Oricon) | 95 |

== Certification ==
| Region | Certification | Certified units/sales |
|---|---|---|
| Japan (RIAJ) | Gold | 200,000^{^} |
^{^} Shipments figures based on certification alone.
