= Full of Love =

Studio album by Shizuka Kudo
- Released: June 2, 1999
- Genres: Pop; R&B
- Length: 51:38
- Label: Pony Canyon
- Producer: Shizuka Kudo

Shizuka Kudo chronology
Best of Ballade: Current (1998)	Full of Love (1999)	Millennium Best (2000)

Singles from Full of Love
- 1. "Blue Zone" Released: April 7, 1999

Full of Love is the fourteenth studio album by Japanese singer Shizuka Kudo. It was released on June 2, 1999, through Pony Canyon. The album features a contemporary R&B sound, produced by the likes of Chokkaku, Ichirō Hada and Seishirō Kusunose. It has been described as the perfect driving album for the summer.

== Commercial performance ==
Full of Love debuted at number 38 on the Oricon Albums Chart, with 9,000 units sold in its first week. It charted at number 61 with 3,000 units sold on its second week, bringing its reported total at 12,000 copies.

== Track listing ==
All lyrics are written by Aeri.

No.	Title	Music	Arranger(s)	Length
1.	"Blue Zone"	Takashi Tsushimi	Taisuke Sawachika	4:13
2.	"Dynamite" (ダイナマイト, Dainamaito)	Naoki Namiki	Chokkaku; Kumi Sasaki	4:05
3.	"Toward..."	Ichirō Terada	Sawachika	4:25
4.	"Loose"	Hideaki Kuwabara	Ichirō Hada	4:19
5.	"Zutto" (ずっと, "Forever")	Seishirō Kusunose	Sawachika; Kusunose	5:03
6.	"Seaside"	Kusunose	Sawachika	4:50
7.	"Super"	Akira Ikuma	Chokkaku; Naoki Takao	4:40
8.	"That Is Why"	Osamu Yoshikawa	Chokkaku	5:17
9.	"Ziguzagu"	Ikuma	Ikuma	4:56
10.	"Subete o Boku ga..." (すべてを僕が…, "Everything, I Will...")	Hada	Hada	4:11
11.	"Color"	Kusunose	Sawachika; Kusunose	5:39
Total length:				51:38

== Charts ==
Chart (1999)	Peak position	Sales
Japan Weekly Albums (Oricon)	38	12,000
