= Kōki (model) =

Japanese model and songwriter (born 2003)

Kōki,
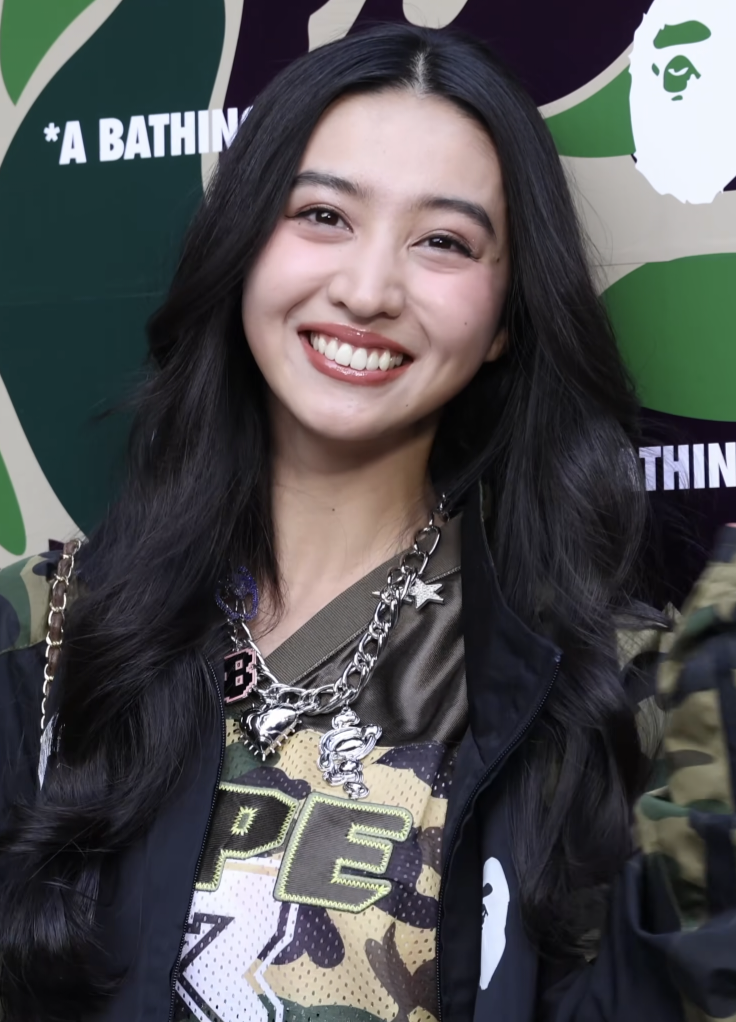
- Koki in March 2026
- Born: Mitsuki Kimura; February 5, 2003 (age 23); Tokyo, Japan
- Occupations: Model; actress; songwriter
- Years active: 2018–present
- Agent(s): Purple Inc., The Society Management
- Height: 165 cm (5 ft 5 in)
- Parents: Takuya Kimura (father); Shizuka Kudo (mother)
- Relatives: Cocomi (sister)

Mitsuki Kimura (木村 光希, Kimura Mitsuki; born February 5, 2003), known professionally as Kōki (stylized as Kōki,), is a Japanese model, songwriter and actress.

== Early life ==
Mitsuki Kimura was born on February 5, 2003, in Tokyo, Japan to actor Takuya Kimura and singer Shizuka Kudo. She had taken lessons in piano and flute, and won the Excellence Award at the 23rd Yamano Junior Flute Contest. She attended The British School in Tokyo and is fluent in English.

== Career ==
Prior to debuting professionally, Kōki had written three songs for her mother Shizuka Kudo's album, Rin, in 2017, as well as for Mika Nakashima. In May 2018, Kōki debuted as a model, appearing in the July 2018 issue of Elle Japon. Kōki has also appeared on covers for fashion magazines such as Numéro Tokyo, Grazia China, Nylon Japan, and Vivi. In August 2018, she became Japan's youngest ambassador for the luxury brand Bulgari. In October 2018, Kōki appeared in her first commercial, endorsing products from Otsuka Pharmaceutical.

In 2019, Kōki wrote and appeared as a featured artist on Daichi Miura's song, "Katasumi", which was used as the opening theme song to the television drama Hakui no Senshi. Kōki made her runway debut at the 2019 Paris Fashion Week, representing Chanel. In 2019, she appeared in the music video of the song "Eternal Love" by Kris Wu as the love interest. In 2022, she starred in the Japanese horror film Ox-Head Village.

== Filmography ==
=== Film ===
| Year | Title | Role | Notes | Ref. |
|---|---|---|---|---|
| 2022 | Ox-Head Village | Shion / Kanon | Lead role | |
| 2024 | Touch | Young Miko | | |
| 2025 | Tornado | Tornado | Lead role | |
| 2025 | True Beauty: Before | Reina Tanikawa | Lead role | |
| 2025 | True Beauty: After | Reina Tanikawa | Lead role | |
| 2027 | Darwin's Game | Shuka | | |

=== Television ===
| Year | Title | Role | Notes | Ref. |
|---|---|---|---|---|
| 2026 | Plastic Beauty | | | |

== Discography ==
=== As featured artist ===
| Title | Year | Peak chart positions | | Sales |
| Title | Year | JPN | | Sales |
| Title | Year | Oricon | Hot 100 | Sales |
|---|---|---|---|---|
| "Katasumi" (片隅) (Daichi Miura feat. Kōki) | 2019 | 12 | 22 | TBA |
"—" denotes releases that did not chart or were not released in that region.

=== Songwriting credits ===
| Year | Album | Artist | Song | Lyrics | | Music | |
| Year | Album | Artist | Song | Credited | With | Credited | With |
|---|---|---|---|---|---|---|---|
| 2017 | Rin | Shizuka Kudo | "Hagane no Mori" (鋼の森) | No | —N/a | Yes | —N/a |
| 2017 | Rin | Shizuka Kudo | "Kasumisō" (かすみ草) | No | —N/a | Yes | —N/a |
| 2017 | Rin | Shizuka Kudo | "Time After Time" | No | —N/a | Yes | —N/a |
| 2018 | Non-album single | Mika Nakashima | "Yume" (夢) | No | —N/a | Yes | —N/a |
| 2019 | Non-album single | Daichi Miura | "Katasumi" (片隅) | No | —N/a | Yes | —N/a |
| 2019 | Non-album single | Daichi Miura | "Corner" | No | —N/a | Yes | Uta, Daichi Miura |

== Awards and accolades ==
| Year | Award | Category | Nominated work | Result | Ref. |
|---|---|---|---|---|---|
| 2013 | 23rd Yamano Junior Flute Contest | Excellence Award | Herself | Won | |
| 2018 | Elle Cinema Awards | Rising Star Award | Herself | Won | |
| 2018 | Yahoo! Search Grand Prix | Model Category | Herself | Won | |
| 2022 | 47th Hochi Film Awards | Best New Artist | Ox-Head Village | Nominated | |
| 2023 | 77th Mainichi Film Awards | Best New Actress | Ox-Head Village | Nominated | |
| 2023 | 65th Blue Ribbon Awards | Best Newcomer | Ox-Head Village | Won | |
| 2025 | 18th Asian Film Awards | AFA Rising Star Award | Herself | Won | |
