= Watashi wa Knife =

Single by Shizuka Kudo
- Released: June 2, 1993
- Genre: Pop
- Length: 4:27
- Label: Pony Canyon
- Songwriter(s): Gorō Matsui; Tsugutoshi Gotō
- Producer(s): Tsugutoshi Gotō

Shizuka Kudo singles chronology
"Dōkoku" (1993)	"Watashi wa Knife" (1993)	"Anata Shika Inai Desho" (1993)

Audio sample
- "Watashi wa Knife": file; help

"Watashi wa Knife" (わたしはナイフ, lit. "I'm a Knife") is a song recorded by Japanese singer Shizuka Kudo. It was released as a single through Pony Canyon on June 2, 1993. It made its first album appearance on the compilation album, Super Best, released later that same year.

== Background ==
"Watashi wa Knife" was written by Gorō Matsui and composed and produced by Tsugutoshi Gotō. It is a pop song reminiscent of Kudo's earlier material. Lyrically, the song describes a protagonist proclaiming herself to be a metaphorical knife "starved" for love and willing to measure up to a rough lover. During the promotional cycle for Super Best, Kudo revealed she doesn't like the title of the song. "I'm more of a saw", she said, half-joking. "Watashi wa Knife" received acclaim for Kudo's upfront vocals, as well as the song's "hard" hook culminating in an "epic" chorus, which were noted for producing an efficient change of pace and making the song memorable. Matsui and Gotō were praised for their practiced collaborative songwriting abilities.

== Chart performance ==
The single debuted at number six on the Oricon Singles Chart, selling 75,000 copies in its first week. It charted in the top 100 for a total of nine straight weeks. With reported sales of 187,000 copies, "Watashi wa Knife" became Kudo's first single since her solo debut to not place in the top 100 of the year-end Oricon Singles Chart.

== Track listing ==
No.	Title	Writer(s)	Arranger(s)	Length
1.	"Watashi wa Knife" (わたしはナイフ, "I'm a Knife")	Gorō Matsui; Tsugutoshi Gotō	Gotō; Satoshi Kadokura; Naoki Takao	4:27
2.	"Shūmaku" (終幕, "The End")	Fumiko Okada; Gotō	Gotō	5:12
3.	"Watashi wa Knife" (Original Karaoke)	Matsui; Gotō	Gotō; Kadokura; Takao	4:27
Total length:				14:07

== Charts ==
Chart (1993)	Peak position
Japan Weekly Singles (Oricon)	6
Japan Monthly Singles (Oricon)	15

== Certification ==
Region	Certification	Certified units/sales
Japan (RIAJ)	Gold	200,000^{^}
^{^} Shipments figures based on certification alone.
