= Senryū no Shizuku =

Single by Shizuka Kudo
- Released: May 9, 1990
- Genre: Pop
- Length: 4:43
- Label: Pony Canyon
- Songwriters: Aeri; Tsugutoshi Gotō
- Producer: Tsugutoshi Gotō

Shizuka Kudo singles chronology
"Kuchibiru Kara Biyaku" (1990)	"Senryū no Shizuku" (1990)	"Watashi ni Tsuite" (1990)

Audio sample
- "Senryū no Shizuku": file; help

"Senryū no Shizuku" (千流(せんりゅう)の雫(しずく); lit. "Drops of a Thousand Streams") is a song recorded by Japanese singer Shizuka Kudo. It was released as a single through Pony Canyon on May 9, 1990. It marks the debut of Kudo as a songwriter. The song was featured on commercials for Taiyo Yuden That's cassette tapes. Similarly to her previous single, "Kuchibiru Kara Biyaku", a limited number of 7-inch vinyls of the single were produced for promotional use. "Senryū no Shizuku" has never appeared on an original album, but was included in the compilation album Unlimited (1990).

== Background ==
The song was written by Shizuka Kudo, under the pseudonym Aeri (愛絵理(あえり)), composed by Tsugutoshi Gotō and arranged by Draw4. Kudo revealed the origin of her pseudonym when she was interviewed as a guest on the Fuji TV music show TK Music Clamp, stating that Aeri is what her mother had considered naming her and she had felt it fitting to use it as her lyricist pseudonym. Lyrically, "Senryū no Shizuku" deals with the theme of forbidden love. The track was praised for its "modern and chic" melody and "delicate" lyrics. Music critics also noted the influence of Miyuki Nakajima's work on Kudo's first forray into songwriting.

== Cover version ==
In 2014, Tomomi Kahara recorded a cover of the song for her album Memories: Kahara Covers. While promoting the album, Kahara performed the song in duet with Kudo on the music show Music Fair.

== Chart performance ==
"Senryū no Shizuku" debuted at number-one on the Oricon Singles Chart, selling 100,000 units in its first week and becoming her seventh consecutive number-one. It spent a total of 17 weeks in the top 100. The single ranked at number 31 on the year-end Oricon Singles Chart.

== Track listing ==
All music is composed by Tsugutoshi Gotō.

No.	Title	Lyrics	Arranger(s)	Length
1.	"Senryū no Shizuku" (千流の雫, "Drops of a Thousand Streams")	Aeri	Draw4	4:43
2.	"Beautiful Word"	Yoshiko Miura	Draw4	4:15
Total length:				8:58

== Charts ==
Chart (1990)	Peak position
Japan Weekly Singles (Oricon)	1
Japan Monthly Singles (Oricon)	5
Japan Yearly Singles (Oricon)	31

== Certification ==
Region	Certification	Certified units/sales
Japan (RIAJ)	Gold	295,000

== See also ==
- List of Oricon number-one singles
- 1990 in Japanese music
