= Gekijō (Shizuka Kudo song) =

Single by Shizuka Kudo

from the album Dress
- Released: November 7, 1996
- Genre: Pop
- Length: 4:39
- Label: Pony Canyon
- Songwriter: Miyuki Nakajima
- Producers: Miyuki Nakajima; Ichizō Seo

Shizuka Kudo singles chronology
"Yū" (1996)	"Gekijō" (1996)	"A.S.A.P." (1997)

Audio sample
- "Gekijō": file; help

"Gekijō" (激情(げきじょう); lit. "Passion") is a song recorded by Japanese singer Shizuka Kudo, from her twelfth studio album, Dress. It was released by Pony Canyon as the album's lead single on November 7, 1996. It is the theme song of the CX television series Yuzurenai Yoru, starring Kudo herself. "Gekijō" was written by Miyuki Nakajima specifically for the drama; after reading the script, Kudo immediately thought of Nakajima for the soundtrack and sought to have her write the theme song. Nakajima's lyrics invoke the series' title, which loosely translates to "Unyielding Night".

== Background and composition ==
"Gekijō" marks the first collaboration between Kudo and Nakajima since "Dōkoku", and the first song Nakajima has written for Kudo on which she is credited for both the lyrics and the music. It is composed in the key of G minor and set to a tempo of 120 beats per minute. Kudo's vocals span from G_{3} to C_{5}. Nakajima produced the song with her long-time collaborator Ichizō Seo. Lyrically, the song deals with the theme of infidelity. Nakajima writes about a protagonist having to face adversity in love because her lover is romantically committed to someone else. The narrator laments having to cause others pain and ponders where succumbing to passion will lead her.

Nakajima received acclaim for the sorrowful and typically Japanese tone of her lyrics and melody. Kudo's vocal performance was praised for its firmness.

== Cover versions ==
In 1997, Nakajima covered the song in concert while touring for the album Paradise Cafe. In 2014, Momoiro Clover Z performed the song with Kudo on the CX variety show Shin Dōmoto Kyōdai. That same year, Tomomi Kahara performed "Gekijō" in duet with Kudo on the CX music show Atashi no Ongaku. In 2017, Tomokazu Seki recorded a cover of the song for the tribute album, Shizuka Kudo Tribute.

== Chart performance ==
"Gekijō" debuted at number ten on the Oricon Singles Chart with 68,000 copies sold in its first week, becoming Kudo's first single to break the top 10 since "Ice Rain". It slid to number twelve on its second week, selling 52,000 copies. It spent the following five weeks in the top 20 before dropping to number 25 on its tenth charting week. The single charted for a total of 15 weeks.

With only its first two weeks counting towards the year-end tally, "Gekijō" did not place in the top 100 for 1996. However, with sales exceeding 303,000 copies, the single ranked at number 99 on the year-end Oricon Singles Chart for 1997.

== Track listing ==
No.	Title	Writer(s)	Arranger(s)	Length
1.	"Gekijō" (激情, "Passion")	Miyuki Nakajima	Ichizō Seo	4:39
2.	"Nagai Kami" (長い髪, "Long Hair")	Aeri; Toshiaki Matsumoto	Akihisa Matsūra	4:51
3.	"Gekijō" (Original Karaoke)	Nakajima	Seo	4:39
Total length:				14:09

== Charts ==
Chart (1996–97)	Peak position
Japan Weekly Singles (Oricon)	10
Japan Monthly Singles (Oricon)	15
Japan Yearly Singles (Oricon)	99

== Certification ==
Region	Certification	Certified units/sales
Japan (RIAJ)	Platinum	424,000
