= Watashi ni Tsuite =

Single by Shizuka Kudo
- Released: September 21, 1990
- Genre: Pop; folk
- Length: 4:07
- Label: Pony Canyon
- Songwriters: Miyuki Nakajima; Tsugutoshi Gotō
- Producer: Tsugutoshi Gotō

Shizuka Kudo singles chronology
"Senryū no Shizuku" (1990)	"Watashi ni Tsuite" (1990)	"Boya Boya Dekinai" (1991)

Audio sample
- "Watashi ni Tsuite": file; help

"Watashi ni Tsuite" (私(わたし)について; lit. "About Me") is a song by the Japanese singer Shizuka Kudo. It was released as a single by Pony Canyon on September 21, 1990. The song made its first album appearance on the compilation album Unlimited, released that same year.

== Background ==
The song is described as a folk ballad driven by acoustic guitar. It was written by Miyuki Nakajima and Tsugutoshi Gotō and arranged by Draw4. It marks the first collaboration between Nakajima and Kudo since "Kōsa ni Fukarete". Lyrically, the song involves Kudo cryptically describing herself to a potential lover, comparing herself to "a rose, a poison, a mystery, or maybe a flame" and asking him whether or not he would ultimately choose to be with her. Nakajima wrote the song from the perspective of Kudo, based on her first impressions of the singer. In 1992, Nakajima covered the song in concert during the Carnival 1992 tour.

== Chart performance ==
"Watashi ni Tsuite" debuted at number one on the Oricon Singles Chart, selling 76,000 copies in its first week and becoming the last in a string of eight consecutive number-one singles. The single charted in the top 100 for a total of 13 weeks. The song ranked at number two on the monthly Oricon Singles Chart, bested only by TMN's "Time to Count Down". It ranked at number 46 on the year-end Oricon Singles Chart.

== Track listing ==
All lyrics are written by Miyuki Nakajima; all music is composed by Tsugutoshi Gotō.

No.	Title	Arranger(s)	Length
1.	"Watashi ni Tsuite" (私について, "About Me")	Draw4	4:07
2.	"Tel..Me"	Draw4	4:00
Total length:			8:07

== Charts ==
Chart (1990)	Peak position
Japan Weekly Singles (Oricon)	1
Japan Monthly Singles (Oricon)	2
Japan Yearly Singles (Oricon)	46

Region	Certification	Certified units/sales
Japan (RIAJ)	Gold	265,000

== See also ==
- List of Oricon number-one singles
- 1990 in Japanese music
