= Boya Boya Dekinai =

Single by Shizuka Kudo

from the album Mind Universe
- Released: January 23, 1991
- Genre: Pop; ska
- Length: 3:41
- Label: Pony Canyon
- Songwriter(s): Gorō Matsui; Tsugutoshi Gotō
- Producer(s): Tsugutoshi Gotō

Shizuka Kudo singles chronology
"Watashi ni Tsuite" (1990)	"Boya Boya Dekinai" (1991)	"Please" (1991)

Audio sample
- file; help

"Boya Boya Dekinai" (ぼやぼやできない, lit. "Can't Be Careless") is a song recorded by Japanese singer Shizuka Kudo for her sixth studio album, Mind Universe. It was released by Pony Canyon as the album's lead single on January 23, 1991.

== Background ==
"Boya Boya Dekinai" is a humorous mid-tempo song influenced by the sounds of Motown. The song was written by Gorō Matsui and Tsugutoshi Gotō and produced by the latter. Gotō, who first made his mark as a bassist, was praised for crafting an especially rhythmic tune. Lyrically, the song describes a woman trying to forget a past lover and lamenting the fact she can't be careless with her time anymore if she's to find a lasting relationship.

The B-side for the single, "Ano Sakamichi", was co-written by Kudo, under the pseudonym Aeri, and is a heartfelt ballad dedicated to her older brother, who died in a motorbike accident. While promoting the single, Kudo stated in an interview that she found herself crying in the middle of recording the song.

== Chart performance ==
The song debuted at number two on the Oricon Singles Chart with 99,000 copies sold in its first week, becoming Kudo's first single not to reach the top of the chart since "Daite Kuretara Ii no ni". The single spent a second week at number two, blocked by Kan's "Ai wa Katsu". "Boya Boya Dekinai" stayed on the chart for a total of 13 weeks. It ranked at number 37 on the year-end Oricon Singles Chart.

== Track listing ==
All music is composed by Tsugutoshi Gotō

No.	Title	Lyrics	Arranger(s)	Length
1.	"Boya Boya Dekinai" (ぼやぼやできない, "Can't Be Careless")	Gorō Matsui	Gotō	3:41
2.	"Ano Sakamichi" (あの坂道(さかみち), "That Hill Road")	Aeri	Gotō	4:23
Total length:				8:04

== Charts ==
Chart (1991)	Peak position
Japan Weekly Singles (Oricon)	2
Japan Monthly Singles (Oricon)	3
Japan Yearly Singles (Oricon)	37

== Certification ==
Region	Certification	Certified units/sales
Japan (RIAJ)	Gold	200,000^{^}
^{^} Shipments figures based on certification alone.
