= Arashi no Sugao =

Single by Shizuka Kudo
- Released: May 3, 1989
- Genre: Pop
- Length: 3:30
- Label: Pony Canyon
- Songwriters: Yoshiko Miura; Tsugutoshi Gotō
- Producer: Tsugutoshi Gotō

Shizuka Kudo singles chronology
"Koi Hitoyo" (1988)	"Arashi no Sugao" (1989)	"Kōsa ni Fukarete" (1989)

Audio sample
- file; help

"Arashi no Sugao" (嵐(あらし)の素顔(すがお); lit. "The True Face of the Storm") is a song recorded by Japanese singer Shizuka Kudo, released as a single by Pony Canyon on May 3, 1989. Although the song is one of Kudo's most recognizable hits, as well as widely considered to be her breakout hit, and despite the fact that it was included on the compilation album Harvest, released later that same year, it was never featured on any of Kudo's studio albums. At the fourth Japan Gold Disc Awards, "Arashi no Sugao" was one of the five recipients of the award for Best Single of the Year. In 2015, DAM asked their users to select their favorite Shizuka Kudo songs to sing karaoke to and compiled a top ten list; "Arashi no Sugao" was ranked number seven.

== Composition and critical reception ==
The song was written by Yoshiko Miura and composed and produced by Tsugutoshi Gotō. Lyrically, the song explores themes of scorned love and vulnerability. Miura describes a protagonist's volatile state of mind after being abandoned by a condescending lover, to whom she vows to "raise up a storm and destroy everything". Kudo was praised for her vocal performance and unique tone, credited by critics as one of the main elements behind the success of the song.

== Live performances ==
The live performances of "Arashi no Sugao" achieved fame for the accompanying choreography. After delivering the choruses, Kudo would perform a specific hand movement which involved moving her hand repeatedly below and along the side of her face to the beat of the song. Bobby Yoshino, who choreographed the routine, was inspired by tutting to create the famous hand move. Along with the shoulder-padded skirt suit Kudo wore to perform the song, this signature hand movement is often replicated by comedians performing impressions of Kudo.

== Cover versions ==
In 2006, Nana Kitade recorded a cover for her second EP, Cutie Bunny. In 2012, Janet Kay recorded an English-language cover of the song for her cover album Idol Kay. In 2014, the girl group Feam recorded a cover of the song for their album, Re:Idol: Hajimete no Chū. "Arashi no Sugao" was covered by Kenichi Suzumura as part of the Shizuka Kudo-as-sung-by male voice actors tribute album, Shizuka Kudo Tribute, released in 2017. In 2015, Nanase Aikawa, who credits Kudo as being the artist who inspired her to become a singer and whose songs, including "Arashi no Sugao", she sang at auditions, performed a duet of the song with Kudo at her concert commemorating her 20th anniversary.

== Chart performance ==
"Arashi no Sugao" debuted at number-one on the Oricon Singles Chart, where it stayed for three consecutive weeks. It charted in the top ten for nine straight weeks. "Arashi no Sugao" stayed in the top hundred for a total of 21 weeks and moved over 500,000 copies during its run. The single ranked at number eight on the year-end Oricon Singles Chart for 1989, and was one of three singles released by Kudo that year to rank in the yearly top ten.

== Track listing ==
All music is composed by Tsugutoshi Gotō.

No.	Title	Lyrics	Arranger(s)	Length
1.	"Arashi no Sugao" (嵐の素顔, "The True Face of the Storm")	Yoshiko Miura	Tsugutoshi Gotō	3:30
2.	"Eien no Bōhatei" (永遠の防波堤, "The Mole of Eternity")	Keiko Asō	Gotō	4:27
Total length:				7:57

== Charts ==
Chart (1989)	Peak position
Japan Weekly Singles (Oricon)	1
Japan Monthly Singles (Oricon)	1
Japan Yearly Singles (Oricon)	8

== Certification ==
Region	Certification	Certified units/sales
Japan (RIAJ)	Platinum	524,000

== See also ==
- List of Oricon number-one singles
- 1989 in Japanese music
