= Kōsa ni Fukarete =

Single by Shizuka Kudo
- Released: September 6, 1989
- Genre: Pop
- Length: 3:30
- Label: Pony Canyon
- Songwriters: Miyuki Nakajima; Tsugutoshi Gotō
- Producer: Tsugutoshi Gotō

Shizuka Kudo singles chronology
| "Arashi no Sugao" (1989) | "Kōsa ni Fukarete" (1989) | "Kuchibiru Kara Biyaku" (1990) |

Audio sample
- "Kōsa ni Fukarete": file; help

"Kōsa ni Fukarete" (黄砂(こうさ)に吹(ふ)かれて; lit. "Blowing in the Golden Sands") is a song recorded by Japanese singer Shizuka Kudo, released as a single through Pony Canyon on September 6, 1989. It is Kudo's last single to be released in 7-inch vinyl format. The song, which has never appeared on an original album, was included in the compilation album, Harvest. It was featured on commercials for Taiyo Yuden That's cassette tapes.

"Kōsa ni Fukarete" was the last song to top the charts of the TBS music show The Best Ten on its final broadcast on September 28, 1989. At the fourth Japan Gold Disc Awards, "Kōsa ni Fukarete" was one of the five recipients of the award for Best Single of the Year, which Kudo also won that same year for her single "Arashi no Sugao".

In 2015, DAM asked their users to select their favorite Shizuka Kudo songs to sing karaoke to and compiled a top ten list; "Kōsa ni Fukarete" came in at number one.

== Background and composition ==
"Kōsa ni Fukarete" marks the first collaboration between Kudo and Nakajima since "Mugon... Iroppoi". The song was written by Miyuki Nakajima and Tsugutoshi Gotō. Gotō composed the melody and produced the track before sending it to Nakajima, who then wrote the lyrics. Lyrically, Nakajima employs an exotic imagery of Arabian sandstorms to convey the sentiment of feeling lost after a breakup. She describes the perspective of a woman abandoned by her lover who finds comfort in the fact that there are "as many kind men as there are grains of sand".

== Critical reception ==
The song has been praised as being a "relatable anthem" to entire generations, present and future, of heartbroken women, who are also as "numerous as grains of sand".

== Cover versions ==
In 1989, Nakajima recorded a cover for her third self-cover album, Kaikinetsu. Nakajima's version contains slight changes to the lyrics and is also lowered by two whole steps. Kudo has performed the Kaikinetsu version on the Fuji TV music show Music Fair. In 2015, Kudo performed the song on the same program with Leo Ieiri, Trustrick and Mariya Nishiuchi. In 1993, Krisdayanti recorded a cover of the song in English, dubbed "Lost in the Storm", which was included on the compilation album The Best of Asia Bagus. In 2013, Japanese model and singer Yūki Akimoto recorded a cover for Tsugutoshi Gotō's concept album, King of Pops.

== Chart performance ==
"Kōsa ni Fukarete" debuted at number-one on the Oricon Singles Chart, with 143,000 units sold in its first week, and topped the chart for six consecutive weeks, becoming Kudo's longest-running number-one single. It logged a total of 22 weeks in the top 100 and sold over 500,000 copies. The song was recognized by Oricon as the best-selling single for September and October 1989. The single ranked at number nine on the year-end Oricon Singles Chart for 1989, and was one of three singles released by Kudo that year to rank in the yearly top ten.

== Track listing ==
All lyrics are written by Miyuki Nakajima; all music is composed by Tsugutoshi Gotō.

| No. | Title | Arranger(s) | Length |
|---|---|---|---|
| 1. | "Kōsa ni Fukarete" (黄砂に吹かれて, "Blowing in the Golden Sands") | Tsugutoshi Gotō | 3:51 |
| 2. | "Akiko" (秋子(あきこ)) | Gotō | 3:54 |
| Total length: | | | 7:45 |

== Charts ==
| Chart (1989) | Peak position |
|---|---|
| Japan Weekly Singles (Oricon) | 1 |
| Japan Monthly Singles (Oricon) | 1 |
| Japan Yearly Singles (Oricon) | 9 |

== Certification ==
| Region | Certification | Certified units/sales |
|---|---|---|
| Japan (RIAJ) | Platinum | 586,000 |

== See also ==
- List of Oricon number-one singles
- 1989 in Japanese music
