= Mechakucha ni Naite Shimaitai =

Single by Shizuka Kudo

from the album Trinity
- Released: January 29, 1992
- Genre: Pop
- Length: 5:01
- Label: Pony Canyon
- Songwriters: Gorō Matsui; Tsugutoshi Gotō
- Producer: Tsugutoshi Gotō

Shizuka Kudo singles chronology
"Metamorphose" (1991)	"Mechakucha ni Naite Shimaitai" (1992)	"Urahara" (1992)

Audio sample
- "Mechakucha ni Naite Shimaitai": file; help

"Mechakucha ni Naite Shimaitai" (めちゃくちゃに泣(な)いてしまいたい; lit. "I Wanna Cry Like Crazy") is a song recorded by Japanese singer Shizuka Kudo, from her seventh studio album, Trinity. It was released through Pony Canyon as the album's lead single on January 29, 1992. Kudo performed the song on the 43rd Kōhaku Uta Gassen, marking her fifth consecutive appearance on the annual show. In 2007, Kudo recorded a self-cover of the song with a jazz arrangement for the compilation album Shizuka Kudo 20th Anniversary the Best, released in commemoration of her 20th anniversary.

== Background ==
"Mechakucha ni Naite Shimaitai" was written by Gorō Matsui, composed by Tsugutoshi Gotō and arranged by Gotō and Satoshi Kadokura. Lyrically, the song deals with the theme of heartbreak. Matsui writes about a protagonist wallowing in self-pity and pondering whether she will find peace at night if she lets herself "cry like crazy". The song has been described as an "epic waltz". Kudo was praised for her versatility as a vocalist, and specifically for her compelling delivery of Matsui's lyrics, which received acclaim for perfectly capturing the heartache of separation.

Comedian Sanma Akashiya has listed "Mechakucha ni Naite Shimaitai" as one of his favorite songs. Akashiya was in attendance at Kudo's concert celebrating her 20th anniversary, where she performed the song and dedicated it to him.

== Cover versions ==
In 1992, Hong Kong actress and singer Elaine Ho (何婉盈) recorded a cover of the song for her eponymous album, Elaine, on which it is dubbed "First Love" (初戀). In 2015, Ko Shibasaki recorded her rendition of the song for the cover album, Kō Utau.

== Chart performance ==
The single debuted at number four on the Oricon Singles Chart, selling 93,000 copies in its first week. It charted at number ten on its second week, before falling out of the top ten completely the following week. It stayed in the top 100 for a total of 15 weeks. The single ranked at number 73 on the year-end Oricon Singles Chart.

== Track listing ==
All music is composed by Tsugutoshi Gotō.

No.	Title	Lyrics	Arranger(s)	Length
1.	"Mechakucha ni Naite Shimaitai" (めちゃくちゃに泣いてしまいたい, "I Wanna Cry Like Crazy")	Gorō Matsui	Gotō; Satoshi Kadokura	5:01
2.	"Ryūsei" (流星, "Shooting Star")	Aeri	Gotō	5:07
3.	"Mechakucha ni Naite Shimaitai" (Original Karaoke)		Gotō; Kadokura	5:01
Total length:				15:09

== Charts ==
Chart (1992)	Peak position
Japan Weekly Singles (Oricon)	4
Japan Monthly Singles (Oricon)	8
Japan Yearly Singles (Oricon)	73

== Certification ==
Region	Certification	Certified units/sales
Japan (RIAJ)	Gold	282,000
