= Kuchibiru Kara Biyaku =

Single by Shizuka Kudo

from the album Rosette
- Released: January 10, 1990
- Genre: Pop
- Length: 3:57
- Label: Pony Canyon
- Songwriters: Gorō Matsui; Tsugutoshi Gotō
- Producer: Tsugutoshi Gotō

Shizuka Kudo singles chronology
"Kōsa ni Fukarete" (1989)	"Kuchibiru Kara Biyaku" (1990)	"Senryū no Shizuku" (1990)

Audio sample
- "Kuchibiru Kara Biyaku": file; help

"Kuchibiru Kara Biyaku" (くちびるから媚薬(びやく); lit. "Aphrodisiac from the Lips") is a song recorded by Japanese singer Shizuka Kudo for her fifth studio album, Rosette. It was released by Pony Canyon as the album's lead single on January 10, 1990. Although it was not officially released on vinyl, a few copies were produced for promotional use. Kudo performed the song on the 41st Kōhaku Uta Gassen, marking her third appearance on the program. In 2015, DAM asked their users to select their favorite Shizuka Kudo songs to sing karaoke to and compiled a top ten list; "Kuchibiru Kara Biyaku" came in at number six.

== Background ==
The song is described as a retro-sounding pop number, reminiscent of Group Sounds. It was written by Gorō Matsui and composed by Tsugutoshi Gotō. Gotō and his Draw4 band members Satoshi Kadokura, Takeshi Fujī, Hiroaki Sugawara and Noriyasu Murase created the arrangement while Gotō produced the track. It is the first collaboration between Matsui and Gotō since "Koi Hitoyo". Lyrically, the song describes the temptation the protagonist reads on the lips of a potential lover she is being lured by. The opening line of the song is the familiar saying, "ちょっと待ってよ ねえ" (chotto matte yo, nē), which loosely translates to "wait a minute!". Matsui was inspired by Kudo making it her personal catchphrase at the time to write it into the song. Kudo has described Matsui as "observant", stating of her working relationship with him, "we only exchange emails once a year but he always knows exactly the right lyrics to write".

== Cover version ==
In 2017, Yūichirō Umehara recorded a cover of the song for the Shizuka Kudo-as-sung-by male voice actors tribute album, Shizuka Kudo Tribute.

== Chart performance ==
"Kuchibiru Kara Biyaku" debuted at number-one on the Oricon Singles Chart, with 119,000 units sold in its first week. It slid to number two the following week, then to number three, before rising to the top of the chart a second time on its fourth week. The single charted in the top 100 for a total of 18 weeks. The song ranked at number two on the monthly Oricon Singles Chart for the months of January and February 1990, bested first by Tatsuro Yamashita's "Christmas Eve" and then by Buck-Tick's "Aku no Hana". It ranked at number eight on the year-end Oricon Singles Chart.

== Track listing ==
All lyrics are written by Gorō Matsui; all music is composed by Tsugutoshi Gotō.

No.	Title	Arranger(s)	Length
1.	"Kuchibiru Kara Biyaku" (くちびるから媚薬, "Aphrodisiac from the Lips")	Draw4	3:57
2.	"Serenade" (セレナーデ, Serenāde)	Tsugutoshi Gotō	4:59
Total length:			8:56

== Charts ==
Chart (1990)	Peak position
Japan Weekly Singles (Oricon)	1
Japan Monthly Singles (Oricon)	2
Japan Yearly Singles (Oricon)	8

== Certification ==
Region	Certification	Certified units/sales
Japan (RIAJ)	Platinum	489,000

== See also ==
- List of Oricon number-one singles
- 1990 in Japanese music
