= Dōkoku =

Single by Shizuka Kudo

from the album Rise Me
- Released: February 3, 1993
- Genre: Pop
- Length: 4:48
- Label: Pony Canyon
- Songwriters: Miyuki Nakajima; Tsugutoshi Gotō
- Producer: Tsugutoshi Gotō

Shizuka Kudo singles chronology
"Koe o Kikasete" (1992)	"Dōkoku" (1993)	"Watashi wa Knife" (1993)

Audio sample
- "Dōkoku": file; help

"Dōkoku" (慟哭(どうこく); lit. "Wailing") is a song recorded by Japanese singer Shizuka Kudo for her eighth studio album, Rise Me. It was released by Pony Canyon as the album's lead single on February 3, 1993. "Dōkoku" is the theme song of the CX getsuku television series Ano Hi ni Kaeritai, starring Momoko Kikuchi and Kudo herself as two sisters who fall in love with the same man. Kudo performed the song on the 44th Kōhaku Uta Gassen, marking her sixth consecutive appearance on the annual show. With over a million copies sold, "Dōkoku" remains Kudo's best-selling single to date. In 2015, DAM asked their users to select their favorite Shizuka Kudo songs to sing karaoke to and compiled a top ten list; "Dōkoku" came in at number two.

== Background ==
"Dōkoku" is a mid tempo track written by Miyuki Nakajima, composed by Tsugutoshi Gotō and arranged by Gotō and Naoki Takao. It is the first single since "Watashi ni Tsuite" to be co-written by Nakajima and Gotō. Lyrically, the song deals with the theme of unrequited love. Nakajima writes from the perspective of a woman coming to the realization that her feelings for a male friend have progressed beyond friendship, after "crying all night". She laments the fact that her friend is oblivious to her predicament by imploring him to "stop patronizing me".

Upon reading the lyrics for the first time, Kudo's initial response was to ask for help with pronouncing the title from Yūzō Watanabe, her executive producer at the time. "How do you read this character?", the kanji for "dōkoku" (慟哭) being uncommon, Kudo remembers having to look it up in the dictionary. "Let's make it a cheerful song, to balance out the heavy lyrics," Kudo explained about her approach with recording the track, "this happened, but now I can laugh about it, let's make it that kind of song".

== Critical reception ==
Nakajima received acclaim for the storytelling abilities she demonstrates on "Dōkoku", and for weaving a story that is relatable to both women and men. Gotō was praised for returning to form with a gentle but catchy melody that incorporated various sounds. Kudo was also praised for her interpretation of Nakajima's lyrics and for her clever vocal delivery.

== Cover versions ==
Nakajima recorded a self-cover for her album, Jidai: Time Goes Around, released the same year as Kudo's single. In 2012, Miliyah Kato recorded a cover of the song that was released as a B-side on her single "Aiaiai". In an interview with Excite, Kato praised the power of Nakajima's lyrics, stating "I really felt, by singing the song, that I had become the protagonist". In 2013, Kato performed the song, backed by Gotō, on the CX music show FNS Uta no Natsu Matsuri. She also performed the song in duet with Kudo on Music Fair in 2014. In 2015, Japanese singer Ms. Ooja recorded a cover of the song for her cover album, The Hits: No. 1 Song Covers.

== Chart performance ==
"Dōkoku" debuted at number-one on the Oricon Singles Chart with 242,000 copies sold in its first week, scoring Kudo her best first-week single sales. The single charted for three consecutive weeks in the top five. It held on to the top ten for the next three weeks. "Dōkoku" spent a total of 15 weeks in the top 100 and ranked at number 19 on the year-end Oricon Singles Chart.

== Track listing ==
All lyrics are written by Miyuki Nakajima; all music is composed by Tsugutoshi Gotō.

No.	Title	Arranger(s)	Length
1.	"Dōkoku" (慟哭, "Wailing")	Tsugutoshi Gotō; Naoki Takao	4:48
2.	"Call" (コール, Kōru)	Gotō; Takao	4:34
3.	"Dōkoku" (Original Karaoke)	Gotō; Takao	4:48
Total length:			14:10

== Charts ==
Chart (1993)	Peak position
Japan Weekly Singles (Oricon)	1
Japan Monthly Singles (Oricon)	6
Japan Yearly Singles (Oricon)	19

== Certifications ==
Region	Certification	Certified units/sales
Japan (RIAJ) Physical	2× Platinum	939,000
Japan (RIAJ) Digital	Gold	100,000^{*}
^{*} Sales figures based on certification alone.

== See also ==
- List of Oricon number-one singles
