= Koe o Kikasete (Shizuka Kudo song) =

Single by Shizuka Kudo
- Released: August 21, 1992
- Genre: Pop; gospel
- Length: 6:36
- Label: Pony Canyon
- Songwriter(s): Gorō Matsui; Tsugutoshi Gotō
- Producer(s): Tsugutoshi Gotō

Shizuka Kudo singles chronology
"Urahara" (1992)	"Koe o Kikasete" (1992)	"Dōkoku" (1993)

Audio sample
- "Koe o Kikasete": file; help

"Koe o Kikasete" (声(こえ)を聴(き)かせて; lit. "Let Me Hear Your Voice") is a song recorded by Japanese singer Shizuka Kudo. It was released as a single through Pony Canyon on August 21, 1992. The song was featured on the AX television series Kyōshi Natsuyasumi Monogatari. It made its first album appearance on the compilation album, Best of Ballade: Empathy, released later that same year.

== Background ==
"Koe o Kikasete" was written by Gorō Matsui and composed and produced by Tsugutoshi Gotō, marking the fourth consecutive single of Kudo to have resulted from a collaboration between the two. Lyrically, the song describes a narrator trying to persuade her listeners to overcome their fears and cowardice, imploring them to speak up and not "close your heart off anymore". The song is noted for its use of a gospel choir. Kudo was praised for her presence on the record; she received acclaim for delivering vocals befitting of the genre with ease and critics noted that she was never drowned out by the "grand" backing orchestra of the Southern gospel-influenced track. In 2017, during a retrospective talk show on Yahoo! Japan's GyaO, held in celebration of her 30th anniversary, Kudo stated that "Koe o Kikasete" is one of the few songs whose recording she approached with a conscious desire to make her voice appear bigger and bolder, to match the intensity of the song.

== Chart performance ==
The single debuted at number five on the Oricon Singles Chart, selling 61,000 copies in its first week. It stayed in the top ten for the following two weeks. The single hovered around the top 20 for the next six weeks before dropping to number 41 on its tenth charting week. It spent a total of 12 weeks in the top 100 and ranked at number 61 on the year-end Oricon Singles Chart.

== Track listing ==
All music is composed by Tsugutoshi Gotō.

No.	Title	Lyrics	Arranger(s)	Length
1.	"Koe o Kikasete" (声を聴かせて, "Let Me Hear Your Voice")	Gorō Matsui	Gotō	6:36
2.	"Minamikaze!! Fuku Mae ni..." (南風!!吹く前に…, "Before!! the Southern Wind Blows...")	Aeri	Gotō	4:28
3.	"Koe o Kikasete" (Original Karaoke)		Gotō	6:36
Total length:				17:41

== Charts ==
Chart (1992)	Peak position
Japan Weekly Singles (Oricon)	5
Japan Monthly Singles (Oricon)	10
Japan Yearly Singles (Oricon)	61

== Certification ==
Region	Certification	Certified units/sales
Japan (RIAJ)	Gold	200,000^{^}
^{^} Shipments figures based on certification alone.
