= Mugon... Iroppoi =

Single by Shizuka Kudo
- Released: August 24, 1988
- Genre: Pop
- Length: 3:54
- Label: Pony Canyon
- Songwriters: Miyuki Nakajima; Tsugutoshi Gotō
- Producer: Tsugutoshi Gotō

Shizuka Kudo singles chronology
| "Fu-ji-tsu" (1988) | "Mugon... Iroppoi" (1988) | "Koi Hitoyo" (1988) |

Audio sample
- "Mugon... Iroppoi": file; help

"Mugon... Iroppoi" (MUGO・ん…色(いろ)っぽい; lit. "Silence is... Sexy") is a song recorded by Japanese singer Shizuka Kudo. It was released as a single by Pony Canyon on August 24, 1988. It was used in the Kanebo Cosmetics televised ad campaign of fall 1988, for which the catchphrase was "n... Iroppoi". Kudo made her first appearance on the 39th Kōhaku Uta Gassen and performed "Mugon... Iroppoi" for the Red team. The song was nominated for the Grand Prix at the 30th Japan Record Awards.

== Background ==
The track was written by Miyuki Nakajima and Tsugutoshi Gotō. It was composed in the key of B major and set to a tempo of 140 beats per minute. Kudo's vocals span from B♭_{3} to B_{4}. Lyrically, Nakajima cheekily describes a bashful protagonist struggling to profess her feelings to the object of her affection, whose attempts at seduction are foiled by her cowardly silence, and pondering if "tomorrow will be the day I summon up the courage to finally glance your way".

== Critical reception ==
"Mugon... Iroppoi" is noted for perfectly capturing the definitive kayōkyoku sound of the late 1980s. Nakajima and Gotō were praised for crafting a light pop song filled with pathos that has since become emblematic of its era.

== Cover versions ==
In 2005, Ryoko Shiraishi, who voiced the character of Suzuka Shibasaki on the drama CD series Mone, recorded a cover of the song in character for the compilation album Monthly Mone Vocal Collection Vol. 1. In 2007, a cover of the song was included on Hitomi Kitamura's EP, Hitomi ni Dokkin': Yasashiku Mitsumete. Yūko Minaguchi of the LovePlus dating sim recorded a cover of the song in character as Nene Anegasaki for the cover album Utau LovePlus, released in 2011. The song was also covered by Miho Arakawa on her Trillion Starlights EP. Sumire Uesaka covered the song for her 2014 album Uesaka Sumire Presents 80-nendai Idol Kayō Ketteiban. Nana Mizuki recorded a cover in character as Moka Akashiya from the anime Rosario + Vampire for the compilation album Rosario + Vampire: Idol Cover Best (2009). Mizuki also performed a live duet of the song with Kudo in 2014 on the Fuji TV program Music Fair. "Mugon... Iroppoi" was covered by Hiro Shimono as part of the Shizuka Kudo-as-sung-by male voice actors tribute album, Shizuka Kudo Tribute, released in 2017.

== Chart performance ==
"Mugon... Iroppoi" entered the Oricon Singles Chart at number two, selling 121,000 copies. It peaked at number one and charted for 27 consecutive weeks, becoming Kudo's longest-charting single of her career. It is her second consecutive number-one single, following "Fu-ji-tsu", and first to break the half-million total sales mark. The song was the second best-selling single of September 1988 and ranked at number three on the monthly Oricon Singles Chart for the month of October 1988. It ranked at number six on the year-end chart with 457,000 copies sold in 1988.

== Track listing ==
All lyrics are written by Miyuki Nakajima; all music is composed by Tsugutoshi Gotō.

| No. | Title | Arranger(s) | Length |
|---|---|---|---|
| 1. | "Mugon... Iroppoi" (MUGO・ん…色っぽい, "Silence is... Sexy") | Tsugutoshi Gotō | 3:54 |
| 2. | "Gunshū" (群衆(ぐんしゅう), "Crowd") | Gotō | 4:27 |
| Total length: | | | 8:21 |

== Charts ==
| Chart (1988) | Peak position | Sales |
|---|---|---|
| Japan Weekly Singles (Oricon) | 1 | 541,000 |
| Japan Monthly Singles (Oricon) | 2 | 541,000 |
| Japan Yearly Singles (Oricon) | 6 | 541,000 |

== See also ==
- List of Oricon number-one singles
- 1988 in Japanese music
