= Yoshiko Miura =

Japanese lyricist (1949–2023)

- 三浦徳子
- Born: Yoshiko Takahara; 1949; Hirosaki, Aomori Prefecture, Japan
- Died: November 6, 2023 (aged 75); Tokyo, Japan
- Other names: Ailin
- Occupation: Lyricist

Yoshiko Takahara (Japanese: 高原 徳子, 1949 – November 6, 2023), better known under the stage name Yoshiko Miura (Japanese: 三浦徳子), was a Japanese lyricist.

== Life and career ==
Born in Hirosaki, Miura started her professional career in 1978, and the same year she had her breakthrough penning the Junko Yagami's hit "Mizuiro no Ame". She is internationally best known for her anime theme songs, notably Anri's "Cat's Eye" and Takako Ōta's "LOVE Sarigenaku" (from Creamy Mami, the Magic Angel).

Miura penned songs for Yōko Oginome, Yu Hayami, Hiromi Go, Seiko Matsuda, Miki Matsubara, Shizuka Kudo, Kenji Sawada and Yoshie Kashiwabara, Junko Yagami among others. Among her later hits, was Sexy Zone's "Sexy Summer ni Yuki ga Furu". She died of pneumonia on 6 November 2023, at the age of 75.
