= Daite Kuretara Ii no ni =

Single by Shizuka Kudo
- Released: March 2, 1988
- Genre: Pop
- Length: 5:07
- Label: Pony Canyon
- Songwriters: Gorō Matsui; Tsugutoshi Gotō
- Producer: Tsugutoshi Gotō

Shizuka Kudo singles chronology
| "Again" (1987) | "Daite Kuretara Ii no ni" (1988) | "Fu-ji-tsu" (1988) |

Audio sample
- "Daite Kuretara Ii no ni": file; help

"Daite Kuretara Ii no ni" (抱(だ)いてくれたらいいのに; lit. "If Only You Would Hold Me") is a song recorded by Japanese singer Shizuka Kudo. The song was released as a single by Pony Canyon on March 2, 1988. Despite being included in several subsequent compilation albums, "Daite Kuretara Ii no ni" was never included in any studio album. An English version of the song was recorded for Kudo's 1998 ballad compilation album Best of Ballade: Current, on which it is dubbed "Let Me Sleep In Your Arms".

== Background ==
The release of the song marked a turning point in Kudo's career. The song was promoted as the first single since having "stripped" herself of the image created for her by Yasushi Akimoto while a member of the Akimoto-produced idol girl group Onyanko Club, commonly regarded as the precursor to AKB48. Her eagerness to sing more mature songs and shed the cutesy image that she had cultivated during that time was met with a positive reception by her then-managing producer Yūzō Watanabe, who encouraged her to pursue recording the song. Reflecting on that transitional time, Kudo has express that Watanabe's support "sparked a fire in this 17-year-old's heart". The song has enjoyed a steady popularity as a karaoke staple for women across Japan, with it having since been described as a "female anthem".

== Composition ==
The song was written by Gorō Matsui, while Tsugutoshi Gotō composed and produced the track. It is composed in the key of F major and set to a tempo of 70 beats per minute. Kudo's vocals span from A_{3} to C_{5}. Lyrically, the song is about the insecurities and infatuation felt at the beginning stages of a romantic relationship.

== Critical reception ==
The song is described as a revival of the American pop from the 50s and 60s, but in 1980s fashion. Kudo was praised for singing a song with such sex appeal without hesitation.

== Cover versions ==
In 2013, Chiaki recorded a cover of the song for Tsugutoshi Gotō's concept album, King of Pops 2. "Daite Kuretara Ii no ni" was covered by Showtaro Morikubo as part of the Shizuka Kudo-as-sung-by male voice actors tribute album released in 2017.

== Chart performance ==
"Daite Kuretara Ii no ni" debuted at number three on the Oricon Singles Chart and stayed on the chart for sixteen weeks. On its second week it dropped to number seven. On its third charting week the song slid to number nine. The song fell out of the top ten on its fourth week, ranking at number 13 for two consecutive weeks. On its sixth week on the chart it ranked at number 15 and up to number 14 the following week. "Daite Kuretara Ii no ni" dropped to number 38 and out of the top twenty on its eighth charting week. The song moved down at number 37, then up at number 33, then sliding back down to number 34 on its eleventh week on the chart. The single made a last appearance on the Oricon Singles Chart at number 45 before it dropped out of the top fifty the following week.

== Track listing ==
All music is composed by Tsugutoshi Gotō.

| No. | Title | Lyrics | Arranger(s) | Length |
|---|---|---|---|---|
| 1. | "Daite Kuretara Ii no ni" (抱いてくれたらいいのに "If Only You Would Hold Me") | Gorō Matsui | Tsugutoshi Gotō | 5:07 |
| 2. | "Yoake ni Miokurarete" (夜明けに見送られて "Seen Off by the Daybreak") | Yasushi Akimoto | Gotō | 4:30 |
| Total length: | | | | 9:37 |

== Charts ==
| Chart (1988) | Peak position | Sales |
|---|---|---|
| Japan Weekly Singles (Oricon) | 3 | 182,000 |
| Japan Monthly Singles (Oricon) | 8 | 182,000 |
| Japan Yearly Singles (Oricon) | 42 | 182,000 |

== See also ==
- 1988 in Japanese music
