= Gorō Matsui =

- Also known as: G
- Born: December 11, 1957 (age 68); Gifu Prefecture, Japan
- Genres: J-pop
- Occupations: Lyricist, record producer
- Years active: 1981–present
- Label: Avex Group
- Website: avexnet.or.jp/matsui/

Gorō Matsui (松井 五郎, Matsui Gorō) is a Japanese lyricist born 11 December 1957 in Gifu Prefecture, Japan, though he considers Tokyo to be his hometown. Beginning with participation in the Yamaha Popular Song Contests, he made his debut writing the lyrics for the 1981 Chage and Aska album Hot Wind (熱風, Neppū).

Matsui then began writing lyrics for groups such as Anzen Chitai, Kyosuke Himuro, and others, becoming one of the more popular lyricists for a variety of rock bands. He has now written the lyrics for over 2000 songs. Since the late 1980s, most of the lyrics for the music released by Anzen Chitai has been written by Matsui.

As of today, Matsui is under the management of Avex Group, Japan's biggest independent record label. He serves as a resident songwriter for the said company.

== Works ==
Matsui's works include the following:

=== Boyfriend ===
- "Be My Shine"

=== Chage and Aska ===
- Hot Wind (熱風, Neppū)

=== Anzen Chitai ===
- Blue-eyed Eris (碧い瞳のエリス, Aoi Hitomi no Erisu)
- Goodbye to Sorrow (悲しみにさよなら, Kanashimi ni Sayonara)

=== Atsuko Enomoto ===
- Be My Angel

=== Shōko Inoue ===
- God's Mistake (神様のミステイク, Kamisama no Misuteiku)
- Don't Say the Girl's Name (彼女の名前を呼ばないで, Kanojo no Namae o Yobanai de)
- The Elevator from the Stars (星空からのエレベーター, Hoshizora kara no Erebētā)

=== Hiromi Iwasaki ===
- I Can't Live Without Loving You (好きにならずにいられない, Suki ni Narazu ni Irarenai)

=== Yoshie Kashiwabara ===
- I Understand the Sun (太陽は知っている, Taiyō wa Shitteiru)

=== Shizuka Kudo ===
- "Daite Kuretara Ii no ni"
- "Koi Hitoyo"
- "Kuchibiru Kara Biyaku"
- "Boya Boya Dekinai"
- "Mechakucha ni Naite Shimaitai"
- "Koe o Kikasete"
- "Watashi wa Knife"
- "Anata Shika Inai Desho"

=== MIE ===
- "Never" (Japanese-language cover of the Moving Pictures song from the Footloose soundtrack)

=== Akina Nakamori ===
- "Gekka"
- "Hajimete Deatta Hi no Yō ni"

=== Miho Nakayama ===
- "Semi-sweet Magic"
- "Megamitachi no Bōken"
- Jeweluna

=== Megumi Ogata ===
- Traces of Jealousy -Aza- (ジェラシーの痕跡-アザ-, Jerashī no Konseki -Aza-)

=== Project DMM ===
- Ultraman Mebius (ウルトラマンメビウス, Urutoraman Mebiusu)

=== Shanadoo ===
- King Kong
