= Tsugutoshi Gotō =

Tsugutoshi Gotō 後藤 次利
- Born: February 5, 1952 (age 73)
- Origin: Tokyo, Japan
- Genres: Rock; Pop
- Occupations: Songwriter; musician; record producer
- Instruments: Bass; guitar; synthesizer
- Years active: 1971–present
- Website: facebook.com/goto.tsugutoshi

Tsugutoshi Gotō (後藤 次利, Gotō Tsugutoshi), born February 5, 1952, is a Japanese songwriter, bassist and music producer. Gotō broke into the Japanese music industry playing bass on tour for artists like Sadistic Mika Band, Bread & Butter and Shiro Kishibe. He went on to write and produce songs for other artists including Kenji Sawada, Miyuki Nakajima, Shizuka Kudō, and various idol singers. In 1980, Gotō won Song of the Year at the Japan Record Award for his work on Kenji Sawada's song "Tokio".

In 1983, Gotō married former idol singer and actress Midori Kinouchi. The pair divorced four years later. In 1987, he contributed the soundtrack for the Famicom/NES version of the video game Ultima III: Exodus. In 1994, he married former Onyanko Club member Sonoko Kawai. Gotō also joined several musical units like Draw4 in 1990, gym in 2003, Non-Chords in 2004 and WAIP in 2006.
