= Shizuka Kudo =

Japanese musical artist

- 工藤 静香
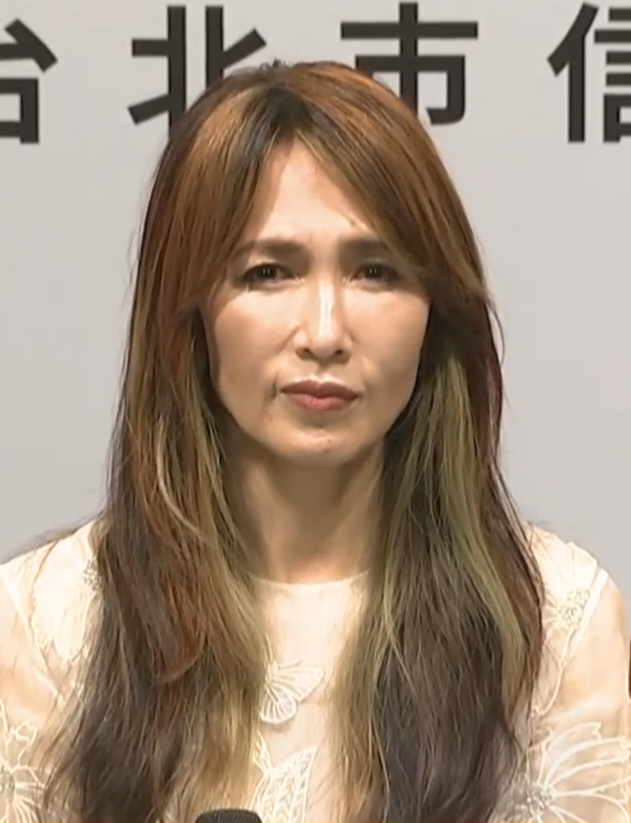
- Kudo in July 2023
- Born: 14 April 1970 (age 56); Hamura, Tokyo, Japan
- Other name: Shizuka Kimura/木村静香 (married name)
- Occupations: Singer; Actress; Idol
- Years active: 1984–present
- Spouse: Takuya Kimura (m. 2000)
- Children: Cocomi; Kōki
- Musical career
- Origin: Tokyo, Japan
- Genres: Pop
- Instrument: Vocals
- Label: Pony Canyon
- Formerly of: Onyanko Club, Ushirogami Hikaretai, Momoko Club, Seventeen Club
- Website: shizuka-kudo.net

Shizuka Kimura (木村 静香, Kimura Shizuka; born 14 April 1970), known by her maiden name Shizuka Kudo (工藤 静香, Kudō Shizuka), is a Japanese singer, actress and former idol, born in Hamura, Tokyo, Japan. She was a member of Onyanko Club between May 1986 and September 1987 and went on to have a successful solo career with 11 number-one hits.

== Biography ==
Kudo began her singing career at the age of 14 as a member of three-piece pop unit Seventeen Club consisted of runners-up from the 1984 Miss Seventeen Contest organized by Japanese teen magazine Seventeen, which Shueisha publishes. They had two singles released by CBS/Sony Records in 1985. Their first single "Su Ki Futari Tomo!" was released on 21 January 1985, and was used in television advertisements for snack food products "Suzuki Kun" and "Sato Kun" manufactured and sold by S&B Foods. The second single "Baajin Kuraishisu (Virgin Crisis)" was released on 25 August 1985. Its lyrics were written by Sunplaza Nakano-kun, who was a lead singer of Japanese rock band Bakufu Slump. Kudo later said that she hated the second single and that she joined the group "just to have fun". With the two singles having failed to chart on the Oricon's Japanese single chart (the national single chart), the group couldn't gain much popularity and disbanded thereafter.

Onyanko Club made its television debut on 1 April 1985, on Fuji TV's daily live television variety show Yūyake Nyan Nyan. Initially the group consisted of nine high school girls and two high school graduates, namely Sayuri Kokusho (number 8) and Satomi Fukunaga (number 11). They were selected from participants in Fuji TV's show All Night Fuji: High School Girl Special (オールナイトフジ女子高生スペシャル) aired in February and March that year. Kudo auditioned for the group in May 1986 during her first year in high school and became a member with number 38 assigned on 23 May. The group gave a new approach to the idol formula with 52 members and three associate members as well as subgroups, such as Ushiroyubi Sasaregumi, Nyangilas and Ushirogami Hikaretai.

After having appeared on the one-hour daily TV show from Monday to Friday regularly and having participated in Onyanko Club's fifth single "Osaki ni Shitsurei" as well as its nationwide concert tour in the summer and fall of 1986, Kudo was selected as one of two backing vocals for Onyanko Club number 36 member Marina Watanabe's first single "Shinkokyu-shite", along with Akiko Ikuina (number 40). The single was released under the name of "Watanabe Marina with Onyanko Club" by Epic/Sony Records on 8 October 1986, and debuted at number one on the single chart. Kudo continued to participate in Onyanko Club's recordings, such as its fourth album Side Line, which was the first one of its albums Kudo participated in and contains few songs in which Kudo had solo vocal parts, such as "Dare no Sei Kana" and "Shin-Shin Kaiin Bangou no Uta".

In the spring of 1987, Kudo was selected as one of the three members of Ushirogami Hikaretai along with Akiko Ikuina and Makiko Saito (number 42). The group's first single "Toki no Kawa wo Koete" was released by Canyon Records on 7 May 1987, and debuted at number one on the single chart. The song and its B-side "Ushirogami Hikaretai" were used as an opening theme and ending theme, respectively, of Fuji TV's anime High School! Kimengumi. Also, Kudo was featured as one of the four main vocals for Onyanko Club's eighth single "Katatsumuri Samba" released by Canyon Records on 21 May 1987. It debuted at number one on the single chart. Ushirogami Hikaretai subsequently released four more singles, two studio albums and two videos from July 1987 to June 1988 with a live album released as its final material in July 1988 (Hora ne, Haru ga Kita – First Concert).

Kudo has said of her time in Onyanko Club that "it was a great experience, with good, bad and really dirty things", and that she tried not to draw too much attention to herself over senior Onyanko Club members who were more popular than her at that time.

Less than three weeks before Onyanko Club disbanded on 20 September 1987 with its two-day final concerts at Yoyogi National Gymnasium in Tokyo, Kudo launched her solo career with her first single "Kindan no Telepathy" released by Canyon Records on 31 August. It debuted at number one on the single chart and also became a favorite throughout Asia during the early 1990s. The second and third singles, "Again" and "Daite-kuretara-iinoni", had moderate success, both reaching number three on the single chart. Released on 1 June 1988, the fourth single "Fu-ji-tsu" reached number one on the chart. The song drew attention as its lyrics were written by famed and critically acclaimed Japanese singer-songwriter Miyuki Nakajima. The number of its sales exceeded that of each of the three previous singles. The fifth single "Mugon... Iroppoi", whose lyrics were written by Nakajima again, was used in television advertisements for cosmetics products of Japanese company Kanebo Cosmetics, and reached number one on the chart. It was sold more than double the previous single. She eventually enjoyed a run of eight consecutive number-one singles in Japan between 1988 and 1990, eleven in total, and four number-one albums between 1988 and 1991.

She continued to release new music every year until 2000 with sporadic releases since then. Her most recent release came in 2008 when she teamed up with Miyuki Nakajima, who wrote lyrics of five of Kudo's number-one singles in the late 80s and early 90s, for a double A-side, "Night Wing"/"Yuki Gasa". Kudo said of their long-term working relationship that "We are not that close. We have a nice distance. Sometimes when I hear her music, it scares me but I especially like her passionate lyrics."

Kudo also appears on television in jidaigeki roles and also creates her own jewelry sold in Japan.

== Personal life ==
Kudo married Takuya Kimura of popular boy-band SMAP in 2000. They have two children named Cocomi and Mitsuki.

== Discography ==
- Mysterious (1988)
- Shizuka (1988)
- Joy (1989)
- Karelia (1989)
- Rosette (1990)
- Mind Universe (1991)
- Trinity (1992)
- Rise Me (1993)
- Expose (1994)
- Purple (1995)
- Doing (1996)
- Dress (1997)
- I'm Not (1998)
- Full of Love (1999)
- Jewelry Box (2002)
- Tsukikage (2005)
- Rin (2017)
- Meikyo Shisui (2024)
- Dynamic (2026)

== Sources ==
- "Chimpman News with Shizuka Kudo". Japan Sugoi. 3 November 2006. Archived from the original on 20 March 2007.
