= Lotus (Umareshi Hana) =

Single by Shizuka Kudo

from the album Tsukikage
- Released: February 16, 2005
- Genre: Pop; R&B
- Length: 5:17
- Label: Pony Canyon
- Songwriters: Aeri; Hiroo Yamaguchi

Shizuka Kudo singles chronology
"Maple" (2002)	"Lotus (Umareshi Hana)" (2005)	"Kokoro no Chikara" (2005)

Audio sample
- "Lotus (Umareshi Hana)": file; help

"Lotus (Umareshi Hana)" (Lotus ～生(う)まれし花(はな)～; lit. "Lotus (Flower in Bloom)") is a song recorded by Japanese singer Shizuka Kudo, from her sixteenth studio album, Tsukikage. It was released by Pony Canyon as the album's lead single on February 16, 2005, and is Kudo's first single in close to three years. The song was featured on TV commercials for Daihatsu Tanto, starring Kudo herself, which had previously featured Kudo singing a cover of Seiko Matsuda's "Sweet Memories".

== Background and composition ==
"Lotus (Umareshi Hana)" is Kudo's first single released under Pony Canyon in six years, since "Blue Zone", and first since returning to the label. It was recorded during studio sessions for the album Tsukikage in November 2004. The song was co-written by Kudo and Hiroo Yamaguchi, composed by the latter, and arranged by Sadahiro Nakano. It is composed in the key of A major and Kudo's vocals span from E_{3} to C♯_{5}. Lyrically, the song is a hopeful love song about overcoming adversity through loving and supporting one another. The title "Lotus" came to Kudo from a line of the song that describes two hands joining, forming what Kudo recognized as a shape similar to the flower. She also explained that the lotus, being a symbol of rebirth, fit her frame of mind at the time.

== Critical reception ==
The song was praised for its catchy melody and dramatic arrangement. Kudo received praise for her clear and natural vocal performance, and for staying modern with her new material.

== Chart performance ==
"Lotus" debuted at number 40 on the Oricon Singles Chart, selling 4,000 copies in its first week. The single charted in the top 100 for five consecutive weeks, selling a total of 8,000 copies.

== Track listing ==
No.	Title	Writer(s)	Arranger(s)	Length
1.	"Lotus (Umareshi Hana)" (Lotus ～生まれし花～, "Lotus (Flower in Bloom)")	Aeri; Hiroo Yamaguchi	Sadahiro Nakano	5:17
2.	"Simple"	Hideyuki Obata	Obata	5:17
3.	"Lotus (Umareshi Hana)" (Less Vocal)	Yamaguchi	Yamaguchi	5:17
Total length:				15:51

== Charts ==
Chart (2005)	Peak position	Sales
Japan Weekly Singles (Oricon)	40	8,000
