= Tsukikage =

Tsukikage (月影, hiragana つきかげ; Japanese for 'moonlight') may refer to:

== Fictional characters ==
- Tsukikage Ninpō-chō Nijūichi no Me (Moonshadow Ninja Scroll: Twenty-One Eyes, 1963; see List of ninja films)
- Ran Tsukikage, in the 2000 animated action comedy Carried by the Wind: Tsukikage Ran
- Tsukikage, teacher in Japanese shōjo manga series Glass Mask
- Toshi Tsukikage, in Soar High! Isami
- Koharu Tsukikage, in the video game Valkyrie Drive: Bhikkhuni
- Tsukikage, in Kamen Rider Decade: All Riders vs. Dai-Shocker
- Tsukikage, blind samurai in the video game Code of Princess
- Yuri Tsukikage, voiced by Aya Hisakawa in anime HeartCatch PreCure!
- Sayoko Tsukikage, in Kousoku Sentai Turboranger
- Takeshi Tsukikage, commander in Space Warrior Baldios
- Kazane Tsukikage, in Kensei: Sacred Fist
- Tsukikage, in Release the Spyce

== Music ==
- Tsukikage (album), album by Japanese singer Shizuka Kudo 2005
- "Tsukikage no Napoli", Japanese version of the song "Tintarella di luna", also included in W's album Koi no Vacance
