= Kokoro no Chikara =

Single by Shizuka Kudo

from the album Tsukikage
- Released: April 27, 2005
- Genre: Pop; R&B
- Length: 5:03
- Label: Pony Canyon
- Songwriters: Takahiro Maeda; H-Wonder
- Producer: H-Wonder

Shizuka Kudo singles chronology
"Lotus (Umareshi Hana)" (2005)	"Kokoro no Chikara" (2005)	"Clāvis (Kagi)" (2006)

Audio sample
- "Kokoro no Chikara": file; help

"Kokoro no Chikara" (心(こころ)のチカラ; lit. "The Power of the Heart") is a song recorded by Japanese singer Shizuka Kudo, from her sixteenth studio album, Tsukikage. It was released by Pony Canyon as the album's second single on April 27, 2005. The song was featured as the theme song on the first installment of the Pretty Cure anime film series, Futari wa Pretty Cure Max Heart the Movie (2005), for which she also voiced the character of the Queen of the Garden of Hope. A separate edition of the single including an alternate version of the song, as well as another song from the movie performed by Mayumi Gojo, was released by Marvelous Entertainment on May 25, 2005.

The coupling song, "Urunda Heart" served as theme song to the Fuji TV variety show, F2 Smile.

== Background and composition ==
"Kokoro no Chikara" was released two months following “Lotus (Umareshi Hana)”, Kudo's comeback single to Pony Canyon. It is a personal favorite of Kudo's; she regards the song as a blessing and lists the song's recording as a key moment in her rediscovery of her love for music. The song, described as an uplifting strings-heavy R&B-influenced midtempo track, was written by Takahiro Maeda and composed, arranged and produced by H-Wonder. It was composed in the key of F major and Kudo's vocals span from G♯_{3} to C_{5}. Lyrically, the song is about finding happiness from within. Kudo's vocal performance was praised for being powerful and effortless.

== Chart performance ==
"Kokoro no Chikara" debuted at number 60 on the Oricon Singles Chart, selling 3,000 copies in its first week, and charted for two weeks.

== Track listing ==
Standard edition
No.	Title	Writer(s)	Arranger(s)	Length
1.	"Kokoro no Chikara" (心のチカラ, "The Power of the Heart")	Takahiro Maeda; H-Wonder	H-Wonder	5:03
2.	"Urunda Heart" (潤んだハート, Urunda Hāto, "Dim Heart")	Aeri; Masaki Iehara	Sadahiro Nakano	5:01
3.	"Kokoro no Chikara" (Less Vocal)	H-Wonder	H-Wonder	5:00
Total length:				15:04

Marvelous Entertainment edition
No.	Title	Artist(s)	Length
1.	"Kokoro no Chikara" (Movie Edit)	Shizuka Kudo	5:20
2.	"Kibō no Namida (Tears for Tomorrow)" (希望の涙 ～Tears for tomorrow～, "Tears of Hope")	Mayumi Gojo	5:47
3.	"Kokoro no Chikara" (Movie Edit Karaoke)	Kudo	5:20
4.	"Kokoro no Chikara" (Karaoke)	Gojo	5:47
Total length:			22:14

== Charts ==
Chart (2005)	Peak position	Sales
Japan Weekly Singles (Oricon)	60	4,000

== Release history ==
Region	Date	Format	Label
Japan	April 27, 2005	CD single; digital download	Pony Canyon
Japan	May 25, 2005	CD single; digital download	Marvelous Entertainment
