= Tsukikage (album) =

Studio album by Shizuka Kudo
- Released: June 1, 2005
- Genre: Pop; R&B
- Length: 46:26
- Label: Pony Canyon
- Producer: Shizuka Kudo

Shizuka Kudo chronology
Shōwa no Kaidan Vol. 1 (2002)	Tsukikage (2005)	Shizuka Kudo 20th Anniversary the Best (2007)

Singles from Tsukikage
- 1. "Lotus (Umareshi Hana)" Released: February 16, 2005; 2. "Kokoro no Chikara" Released: April 27, 2005

Tsukikage (月影(つきかげ), lit. "Moonlight") is the sixteenth studio album by Japanese singer Shizuka Kudo. It was released on June 1, 2005, through Pony Canyon. It is her first album in three years, since Jewelry Box, and her first album released under Pony Canyon in a day short of six years, since Full of Love.

== Background ==
Kudo refers to Tsukikage as her favorite album of hers. In an interview with Real Guide, she explains that it is the first album to make her feel the same intense feeling of accomplishment she felt when she finished recording her fourth studio album, Joy. She wanted her fans to experience the album as a journey with a story, which is why Tsukikage begins and ends with an instrumental intro and outro, her first album since Karelia to do so.

The musical direction for the album was influenced by feedback from fans; Kudo explained to Real Guide that, around May 2004, she started requesting uptempo tracks from producers because her fans had been expressing through letters their desire to hear more upbeat songs with powerful vocals. Kudo singles out the latin-inspired "Tsukiyo no Sabaku" and "Break of Still" as two standout songs from the record. She considers "Replay" a throwback song for her older fans, and "Shinkaigyo" a mature song about independence.

The title of the album, which has the characters for "moon" and "shadow", is meant to represent the two sides of life, the positive and the negative. She liked the "moody vibe" associated with the moon. Speaking on the recording process, she states that, even though she was on a tight schedule, the recording sessions for the album were never strained, as being in the recording booth is Kudo's favorite part of creating an album.

== Commercial performance ==
Rin peaked on the daily Oricon Albums Chart at number 41 on June 1, 2005. It debuted at number 86 on the weekly Oricon Albums Chart, selling 2,000 copies. It dropped to number 171 on its second week, with 1,000 copies sold, before it dropped out of the top 300 the following week. Oricon reports total sales of 3,000 copies.

== Track listing ==
No.	Title	Writer(s)	Arranger(s)	Length
1.	"Intro"	Jin Nakamura	Nakamura	0:49
2.	"Replay"	Aeri; Nakamura	Nakamura	5:08
3.	"Kokoro no Chikara"	Takahiro Maeda; H-Wonder	H-Wonder	5:01
4.	"Tsukiyo no Sabaku" (月夜の砂漠, "Moonlit Desert")	Aeri; Nakamura	Nakamura	3:32
5.	"Lotus (Umareshi Hana)"	Aeri; Hiroo Yamaguchi	Sadahiro Nakano	5:15
6.	"Break of Still"	Saeko Kawamura; Nakamura	Nakamura	3:43
7.	"Rain"	Aeri; Yasunari Okano	Okano	4:09
8.	"Kuchibiru wo Nemurasete" (くちびるを眠らせて, "Put My Lips to Sleep")	Mikiko Tagata; Dreamfield	Daisuke Kahara	4:02
9.	"Memories"	Shin'ichirō Murayama	Murayama	4:54
10.	"Shinkaigyo" (深海魚, "Deep-sea Fish")	Gorō Matsui; Nakamura	Nakamura	4:02
11.	"Taisetsu na Anata e" (大切なあなたへ, "To My Dearest")	Aeri; Murayama	Murayama	4:12
12.	"Outro"	Nakamura	Nakamura	1:39
Total length:				46:26

== Charts ==
Chart (2005)	Peak position
Japan Daily Albums (Oricon)	41
Japan Weekly Albums (Oricon)	86
