= Daihatsu Tanto =

Kei car produced by Daihatsu

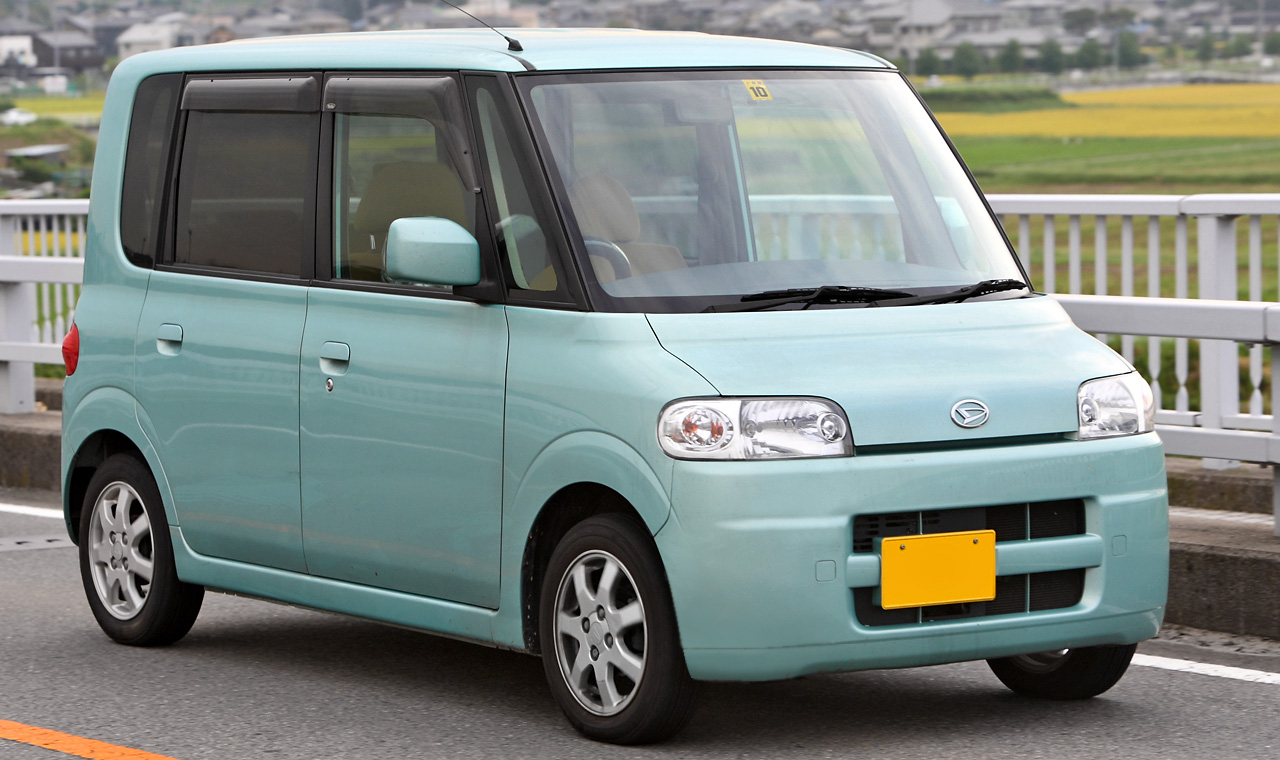
- Daihatsu Tanto X (L350S)

Overview
- Manufacturer: Daihatsu
- Also called: Subaru Chiffon (2016–present)
- Production: November 2003 – present

Body and chassis
- Class: Kei car
- Body style: 5-door hatchback/minivan
- Layout: Front-engine, front-wheel-drive; Front-engine, four-wheel-drive

The Daihatsu Tanto (Japanese: ダイハツ・タント, Hepburn: Daihatsu Tanto) is a kei car manufactured by the Japanese carmaker Daihatsu. It was introduced at the 2003 Tokyo Motor Show as a vehicle based on the Move's "tall" body style, and followed by the Tanto Custom in July 2005.

The name "Tanto" is derived from Italian, Spanish and Portuguese word for "so much" or "a lot".

== First generation (L350; 2003) ==
First generation
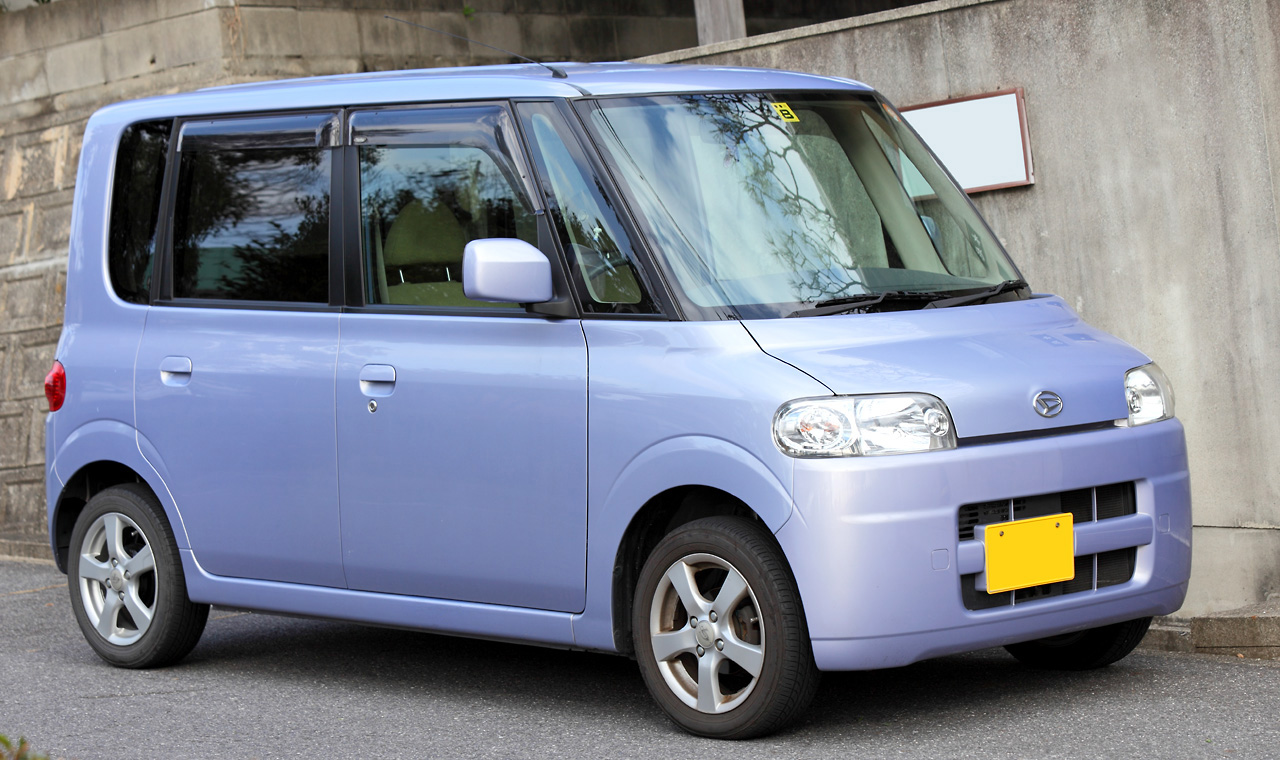
- Tanto X (L350S)

Overview
- Model code: L350
- Production: November 2003 – November 2007
- Assembly: Japan: Ryūō, Shiga (Ryūō plant)

Powertrain
- Engine: Petrol: 658 cc EF-VE I3; 658 cc EF-DET turbo I3
- Power output: 43 kW (58 hp; 58 PS) (EF-VE); 47 kW (63 hp; 64 PS) (EF-DET)
- Transmission: 3-speed automatic; 4-speed automatic

Dimensions
- Wheelbase: 2,440 mm (96.1 in)
- Length: 3,395 mm (133.7 in)
- Width: 1,475 mm (58.1 in)
- Height: 1,725 mm (67.9 in)
- Kerb weight: 870–960 kg (1,918–2,116 lb)

The first-generation Tanto went on sale on 27 November 2003. The grade levels consisted of L, X and X Limited for naturally aspirated engine option, and R and RS for turbocharged engine option. The first generation Tanto was only available with conventional automatic transmissions, with four speeds in most models. Naturally aspirated, four-wheel drive Tantos received a three-speed automatic instead.

The Tanto Custom was added in July 2005, aimed at younger buyers and with a more assertive look. The redesigned headlights were linked by a translucent grille garnish; this look was continued at the rear, where the taillights were clear and extended all the way across the car. The Tanto Custom grade levels consisted of L and X for the naturally aspirated engine, and RS for the turbocharged option. The Custom RS also came standard with 15-inch alloy wheels and a leather-wrapped, Momo steering wheel.

=== Tanto FCHV ===
The Tanto FCHV (Fuel Cell Hybrid Vehicle) was introduced at the 2005 Tokyo Motor Show. Based on the Tanto Custom, the prototype vehicle adds a hydrogen tank and electric motors.

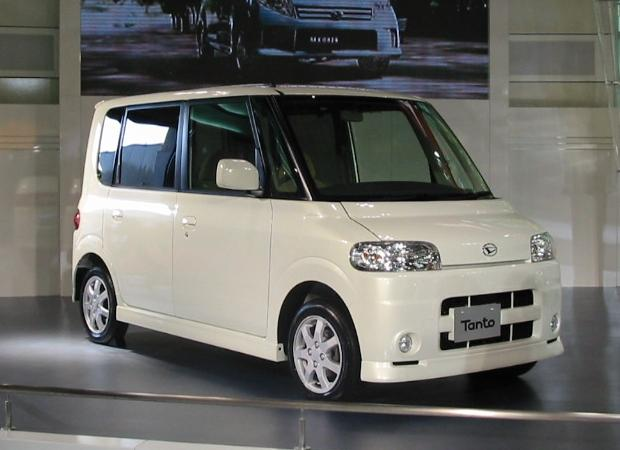
The Tanto at the 2003 Tokyo Motor Show

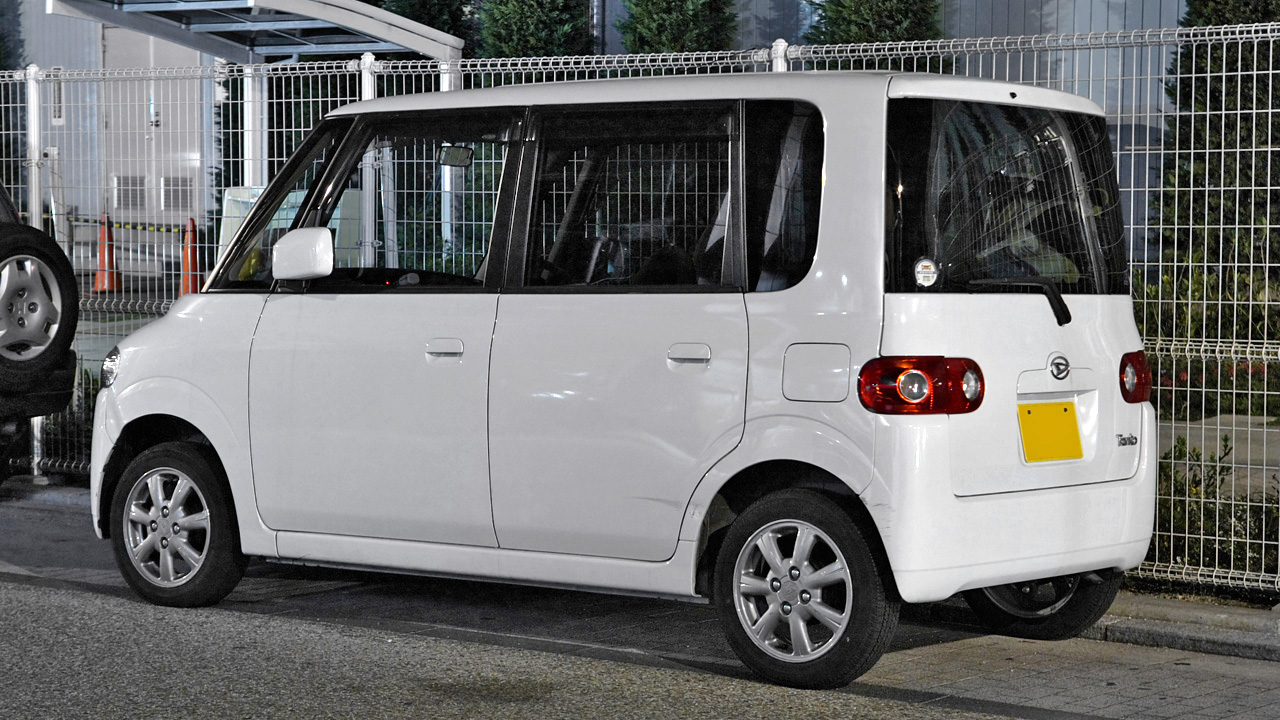
Tanto Happy Selection (L350S)

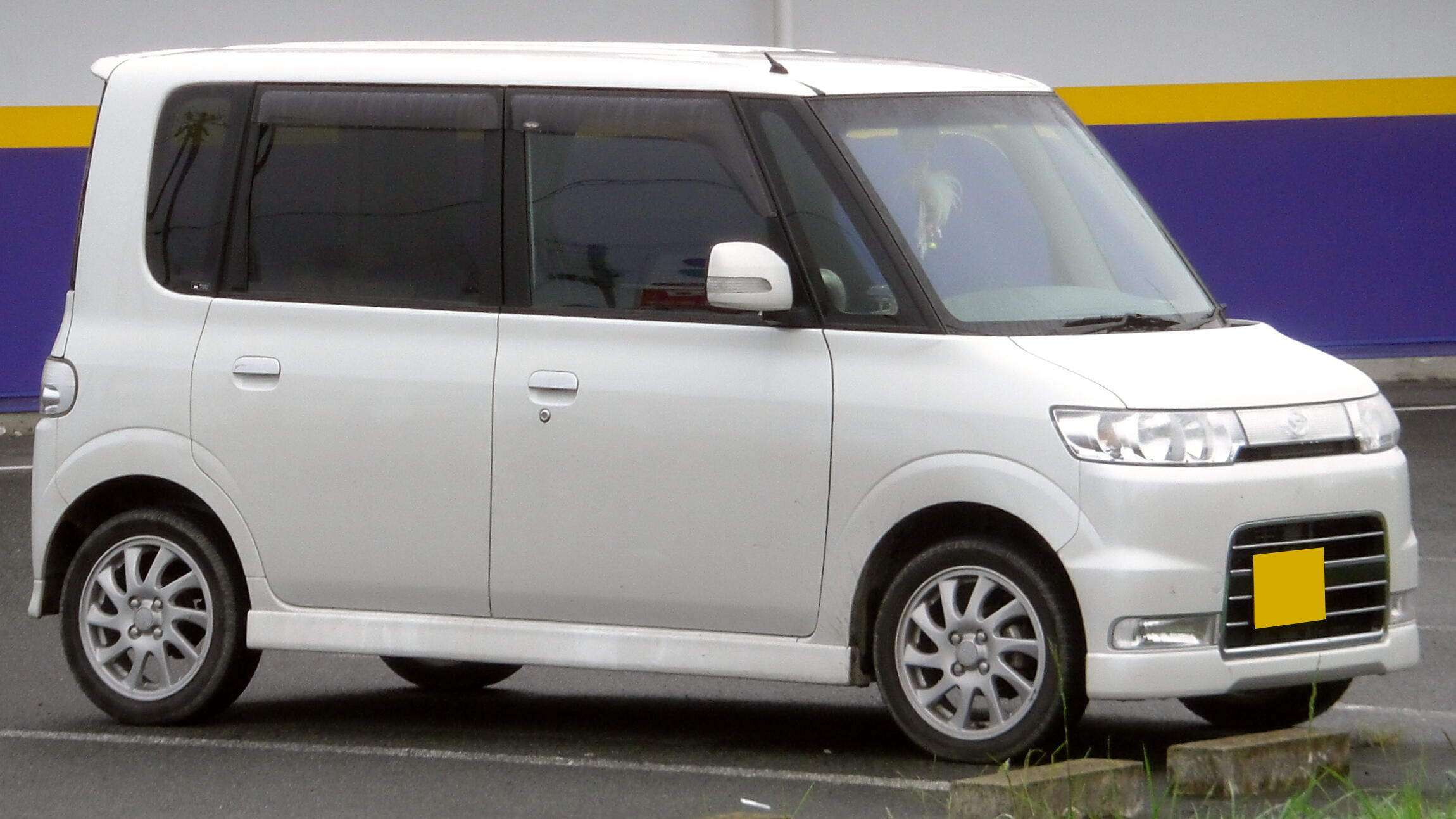
2005 Tanto Custom (L350S)

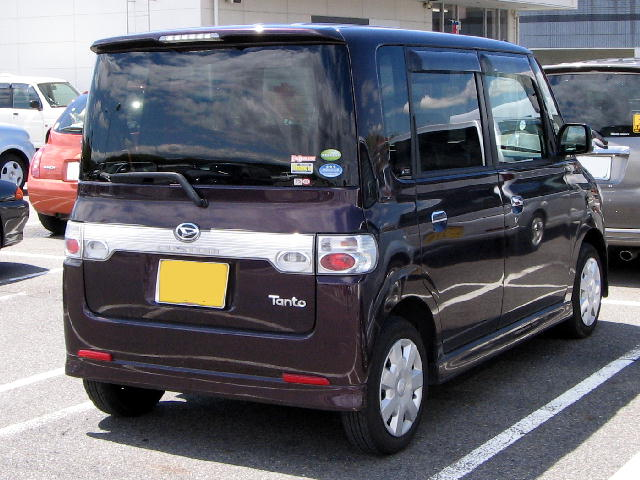
Tanto Custom rear view

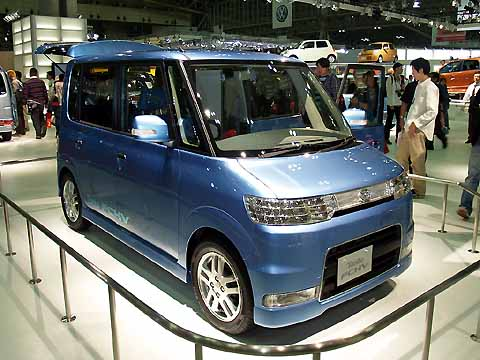
Tanto FCHV

== Second generation (L375; 2007) ==
Second generation
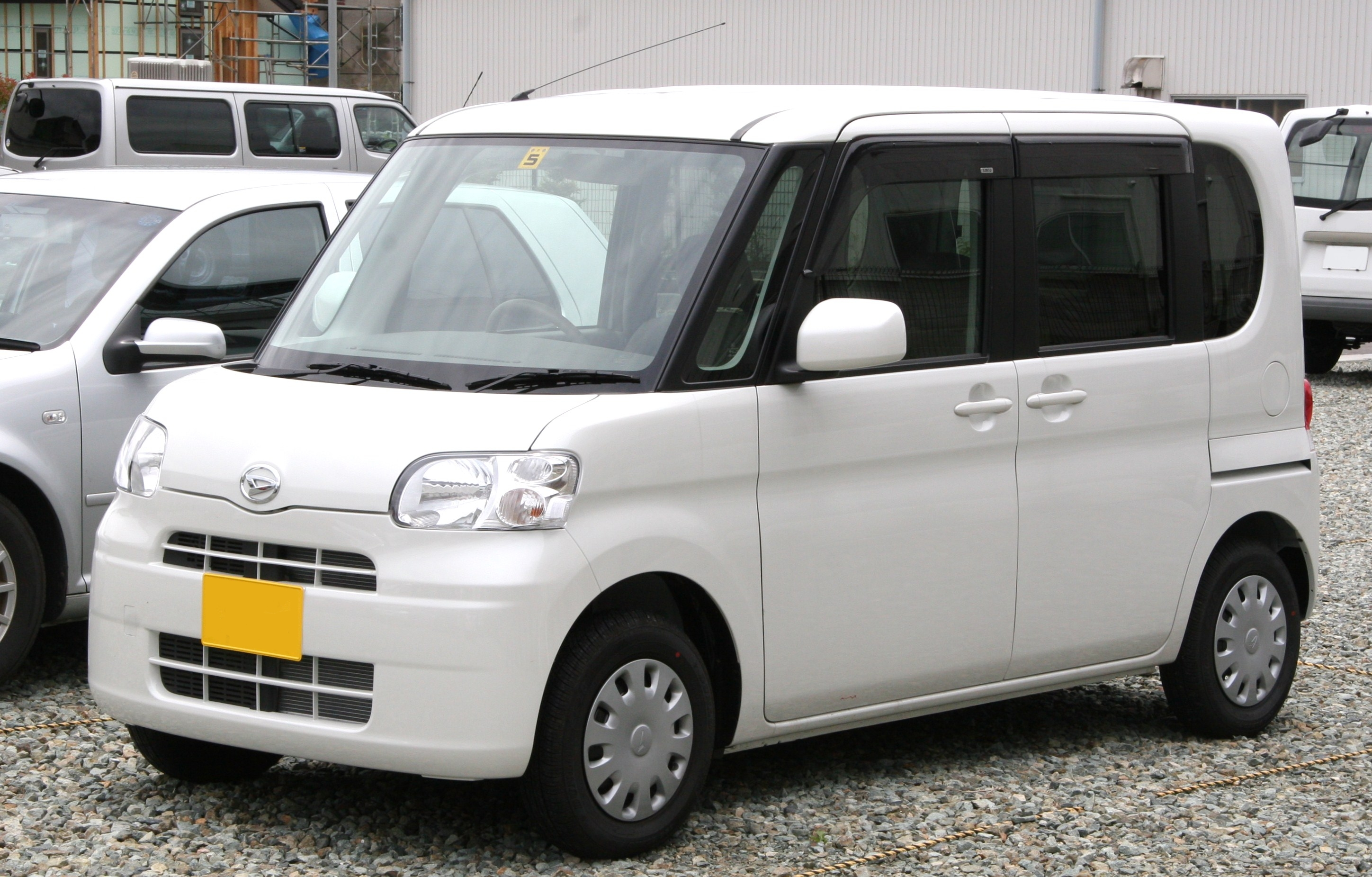

Overview
- Model code: L375
- Production: December 2007 – October 2013
- Assembly: Japan: Ryūō, Shiga (Ryūō plant)
- Designer: Jirou Matsueda and Yoshihiro Yamamoto

Body and chassis
- Related: Daihatsu Tanto Exe

Powertrain
- Engine: Petrol: 658 cc KF-VE I3; 658 cc KF-DET turbo I3
- Power output: 43 kW (58 hp; 58 PS) (KF-VE); 47 kW (63 hp; 64 PS) (KF-DET)
- Transmission: 4-speed automatic; CVT

Dimensions
- Wheelbase: 2,490 mm (98.0 in)
- Length: 3,395 mm (133.7 in)
- Width: 1,475 mm (58.1 in)
- Height: 1,750 mm (68.9 in)
- Kerb weight: 900–1,010 kg (1,984–2,227 lb)

The second-generation Tanto went on sale on 17 December 2007. Among the main features of this generation is an ordinary side-hinged rear door on the right and a sliding door with the B-pillar integrated into the door (called "Miracle Open Door" by Daihatsu) on the left.

In June 2011, the naturally aspirated engines were fitted with Daihatsu's "Eco Idle" start-stop system developed for the Mira e:S, including other minor updates to the KF engine, which made the car eligible for additional tax breaks. From May 2012 the Eco Idle system was also fitted to the turbocharged Custom RS model. In September 2013, the second generation was discontinued in favor of the succeeding generation which went on sale the following month.

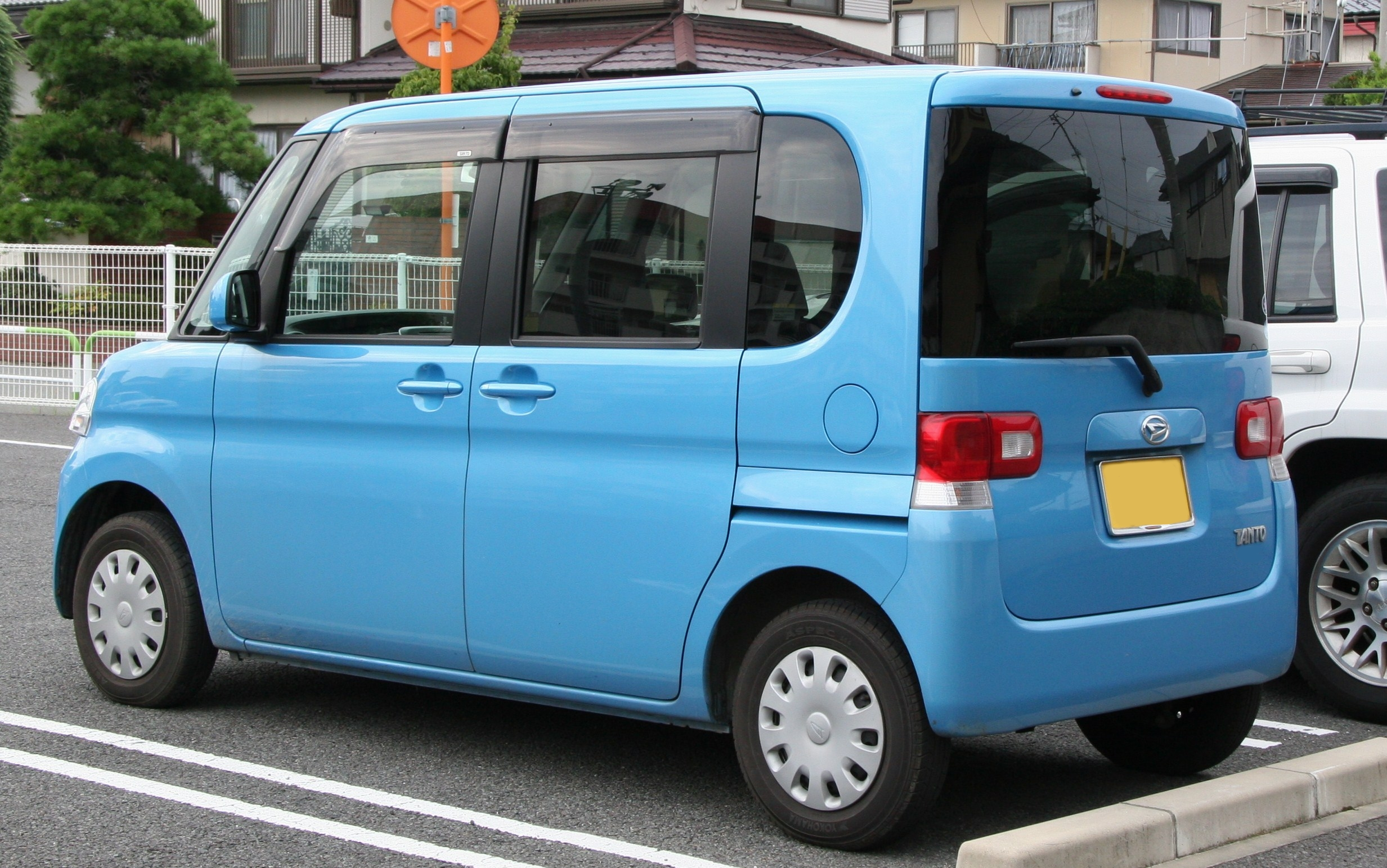
Rear view

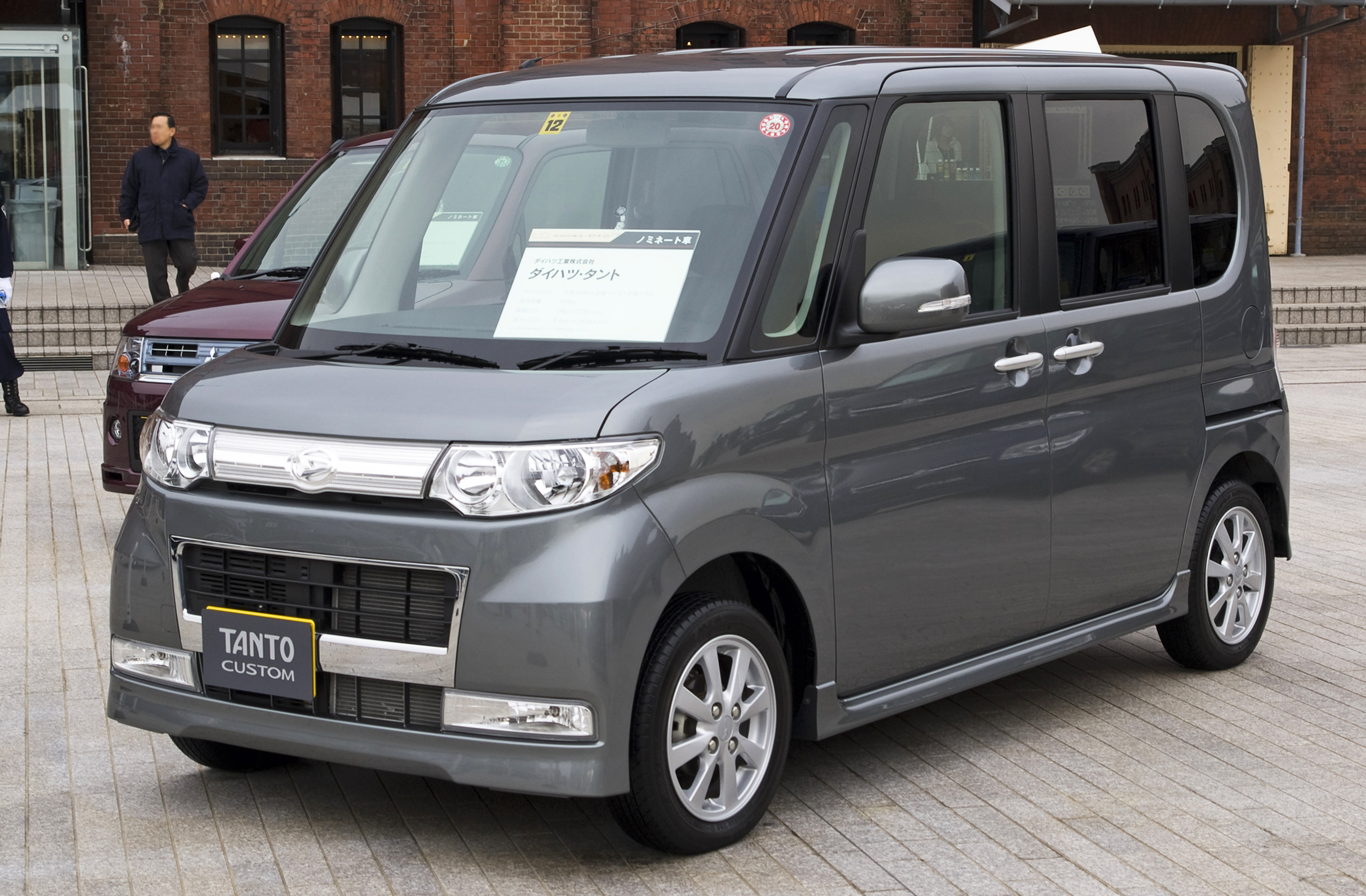
2008 Tanto Custom (L375S)

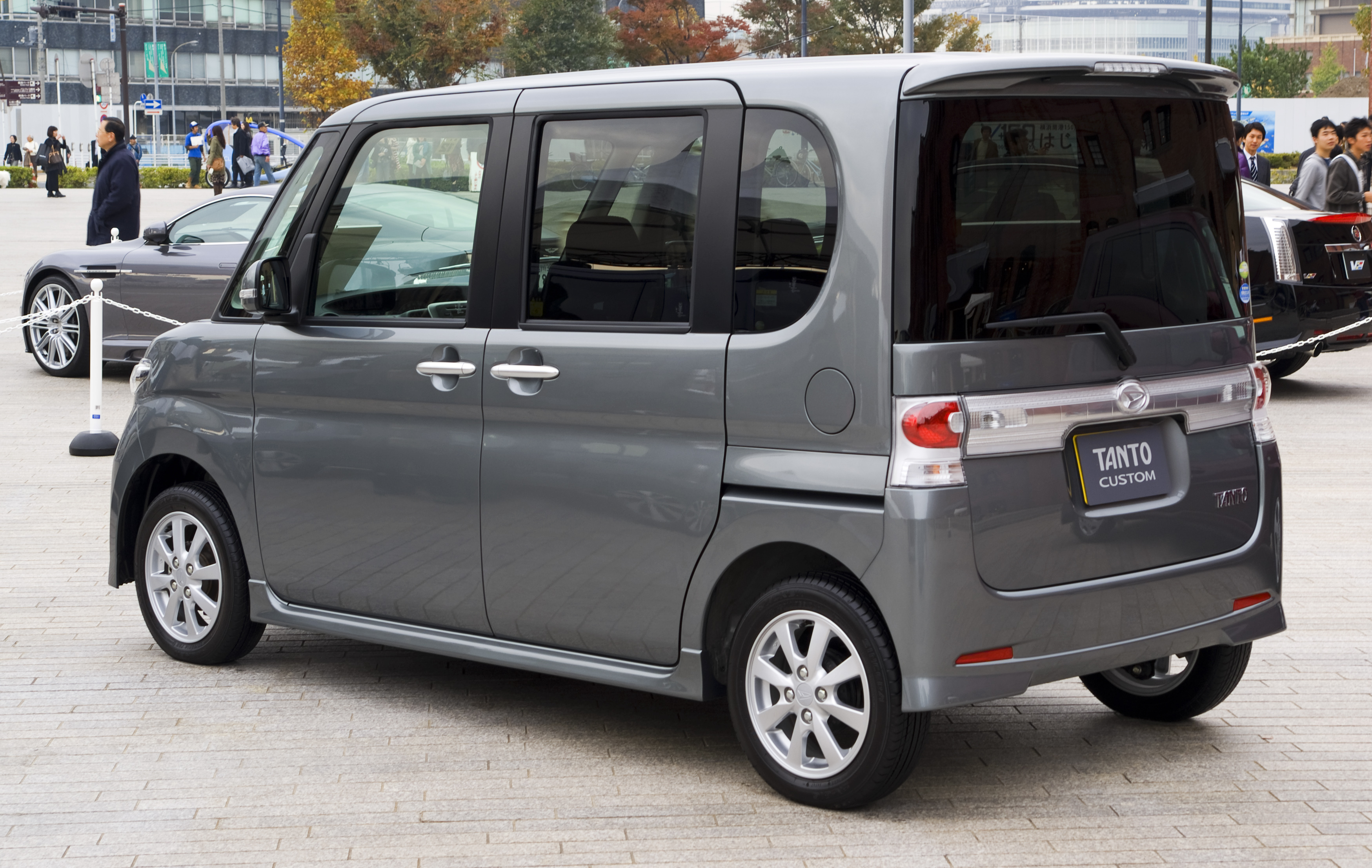
2008 Tanto Custom (L375S)

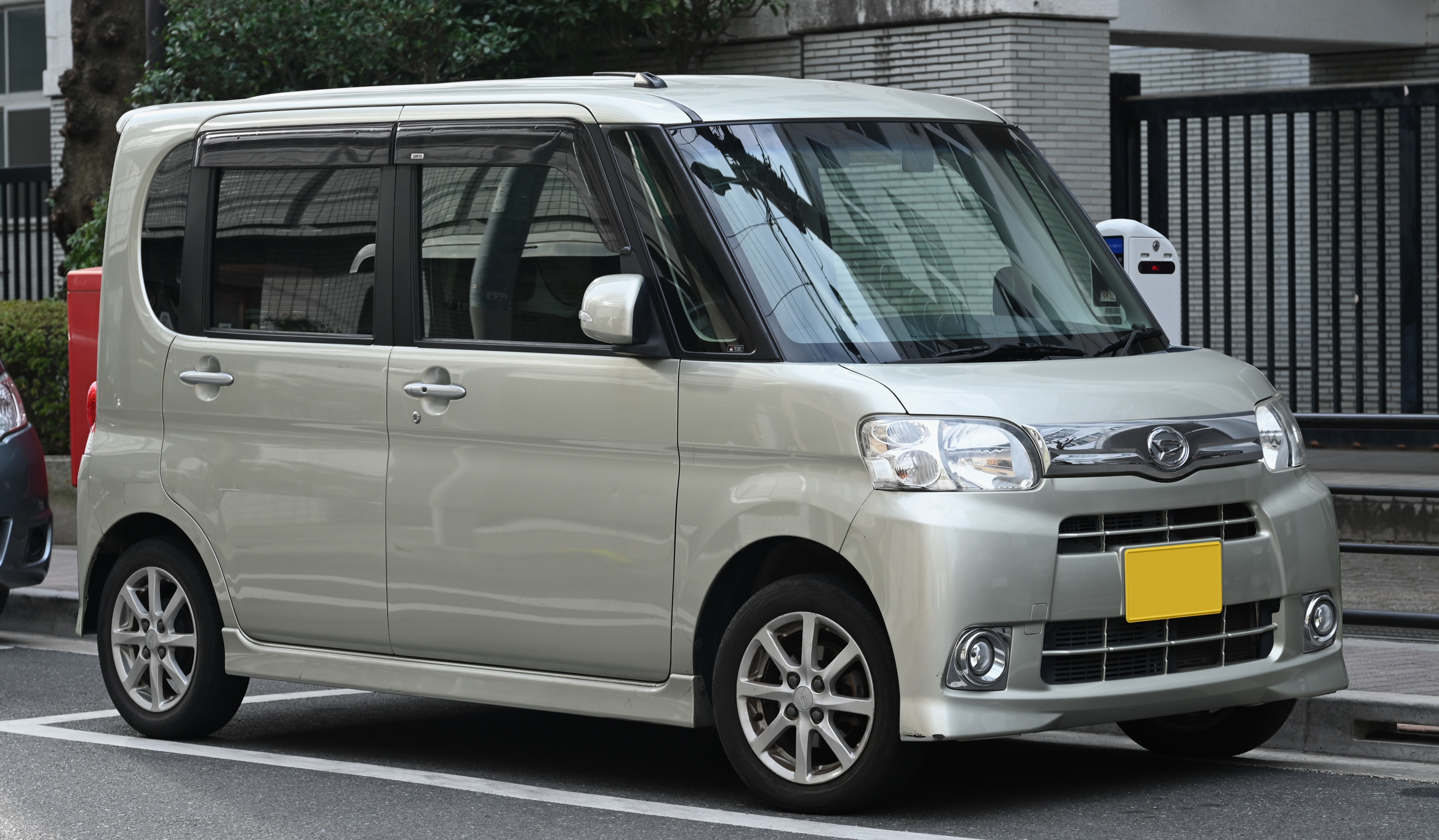
2011–2013 Tanto G (L375S)

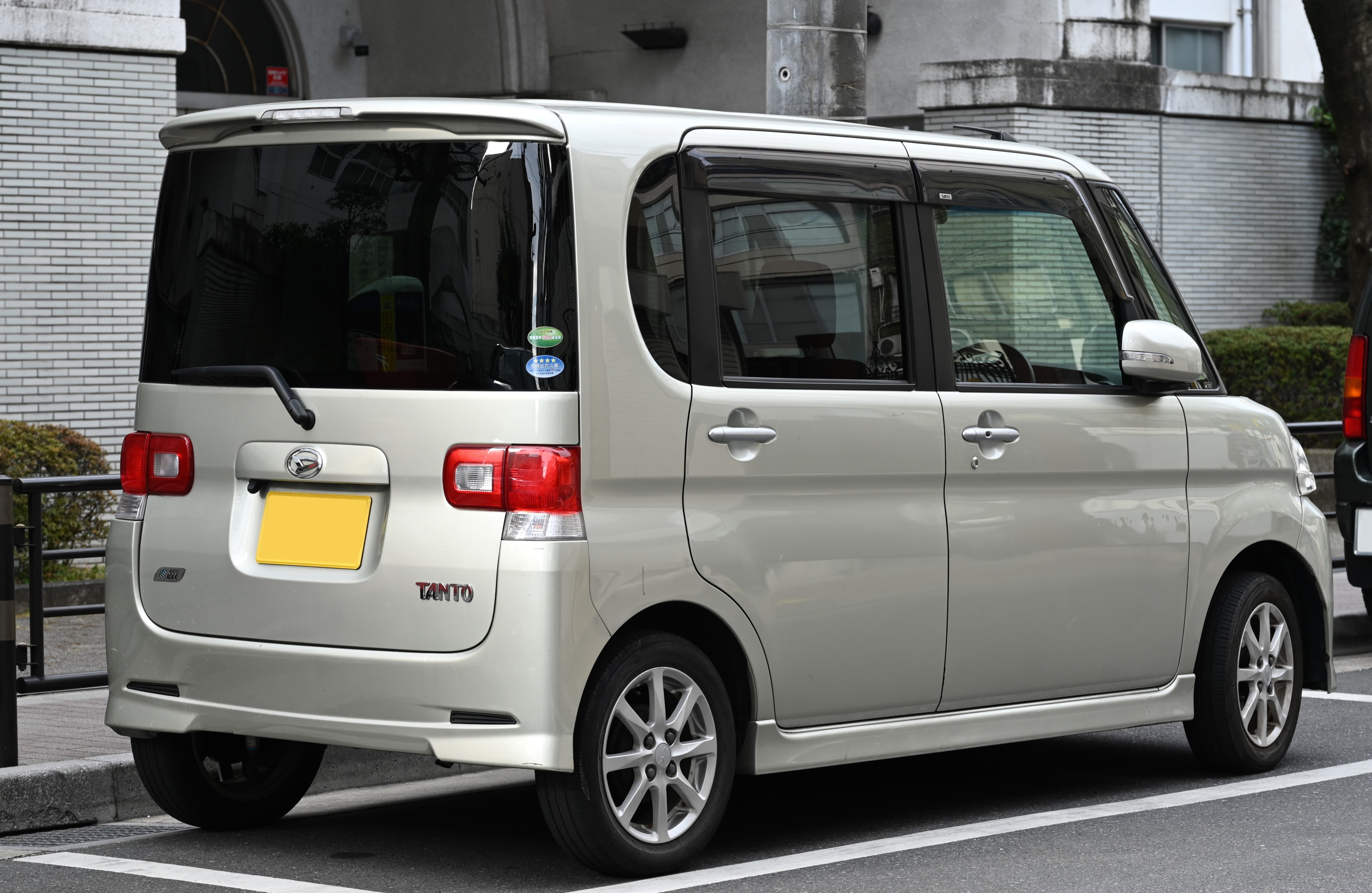
2011–2013 Tanto G (L375S)

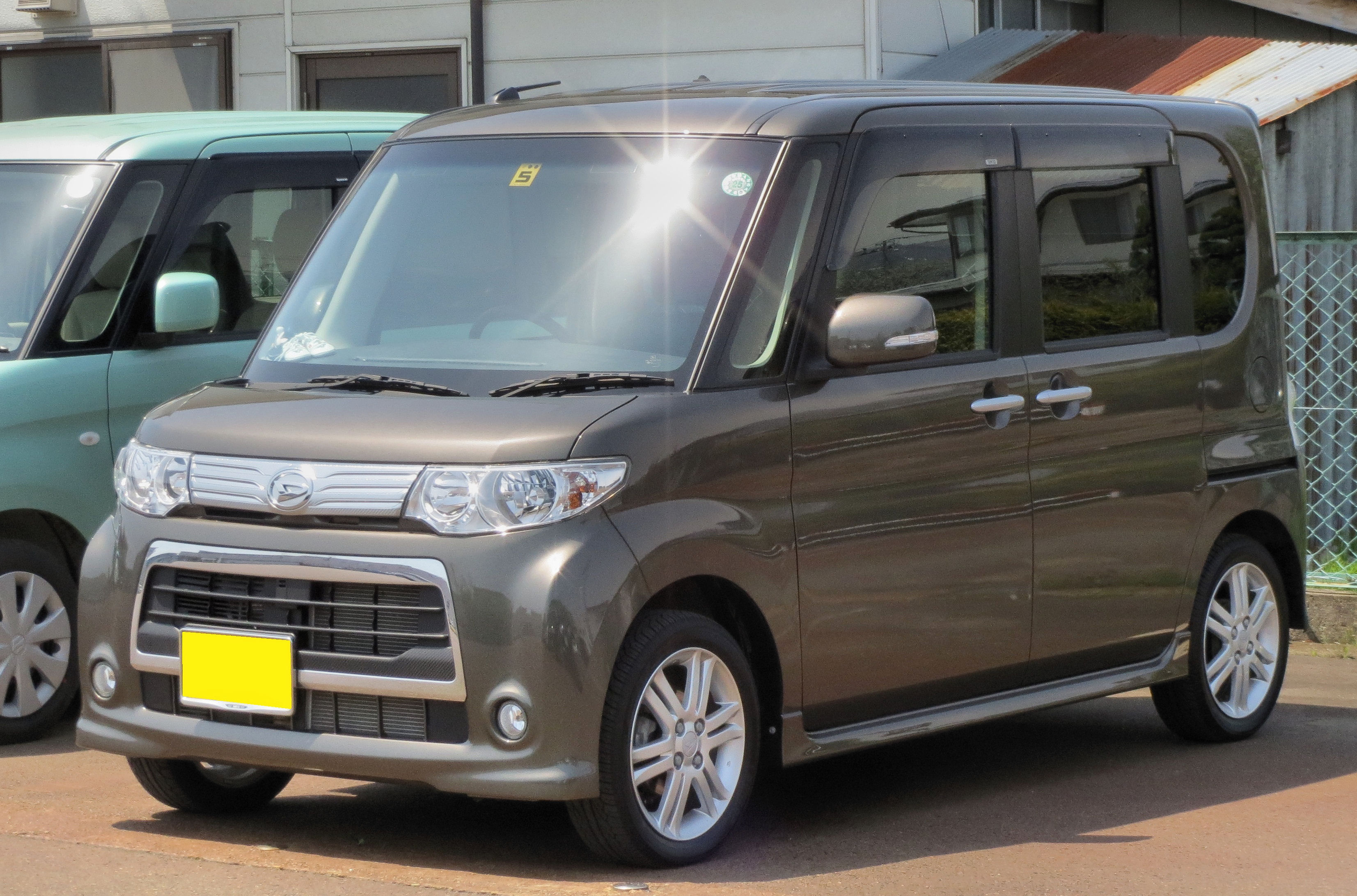
Tanto Custom RS Turbo (L375S)

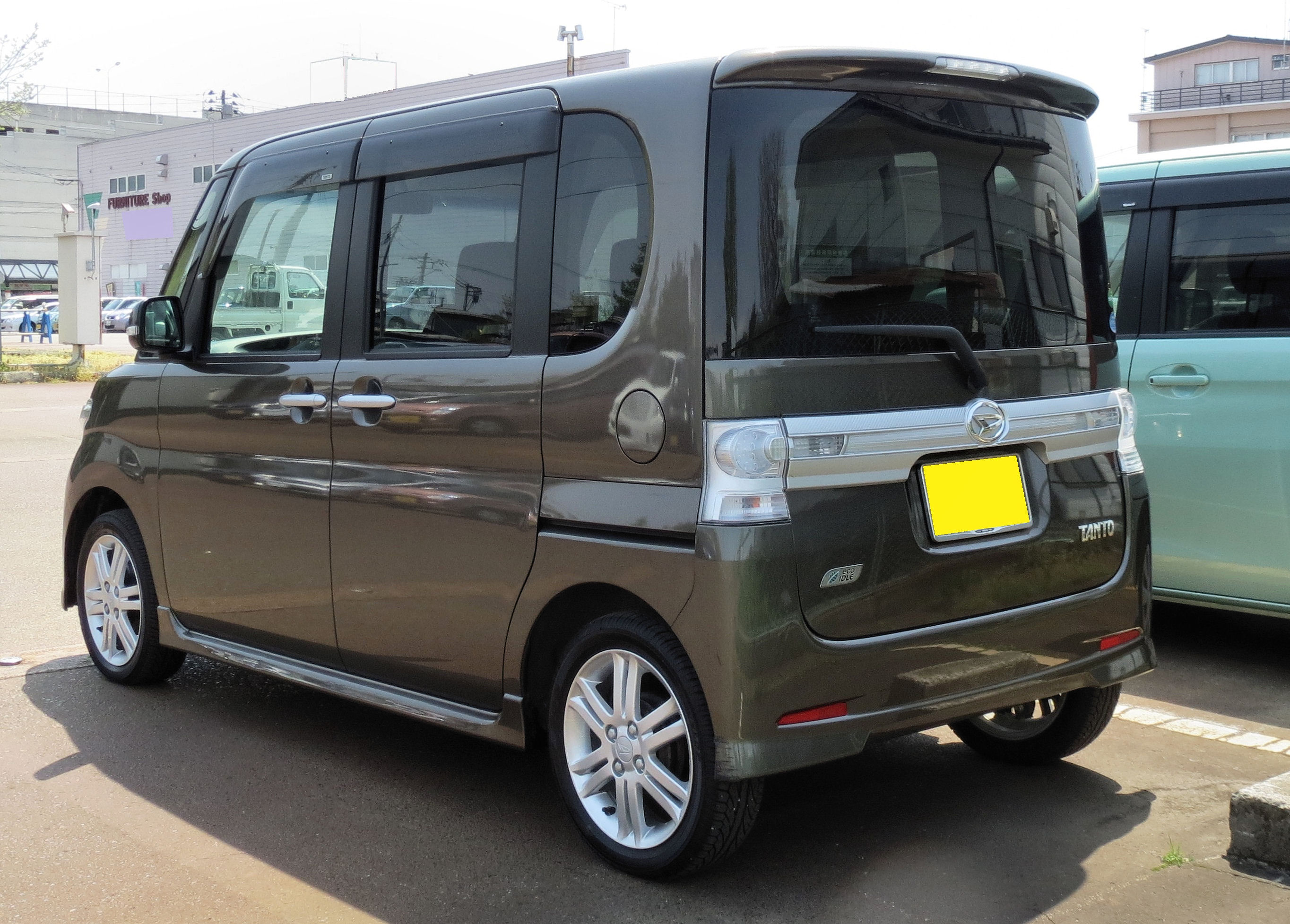
Tanto Custom RS Turbo (L375S)

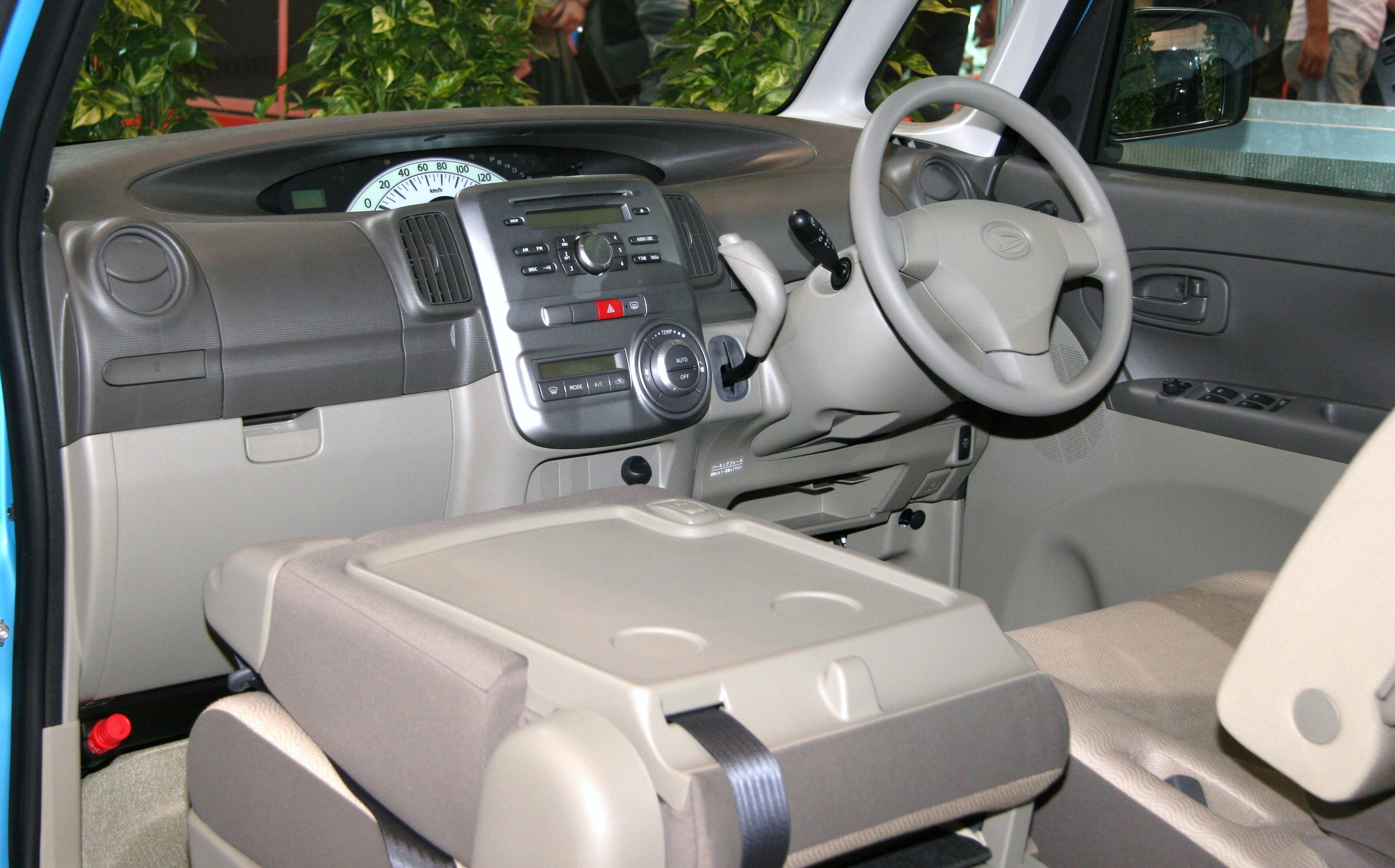
Interior

== Third generation (LA600; 2013) ==
Third generation
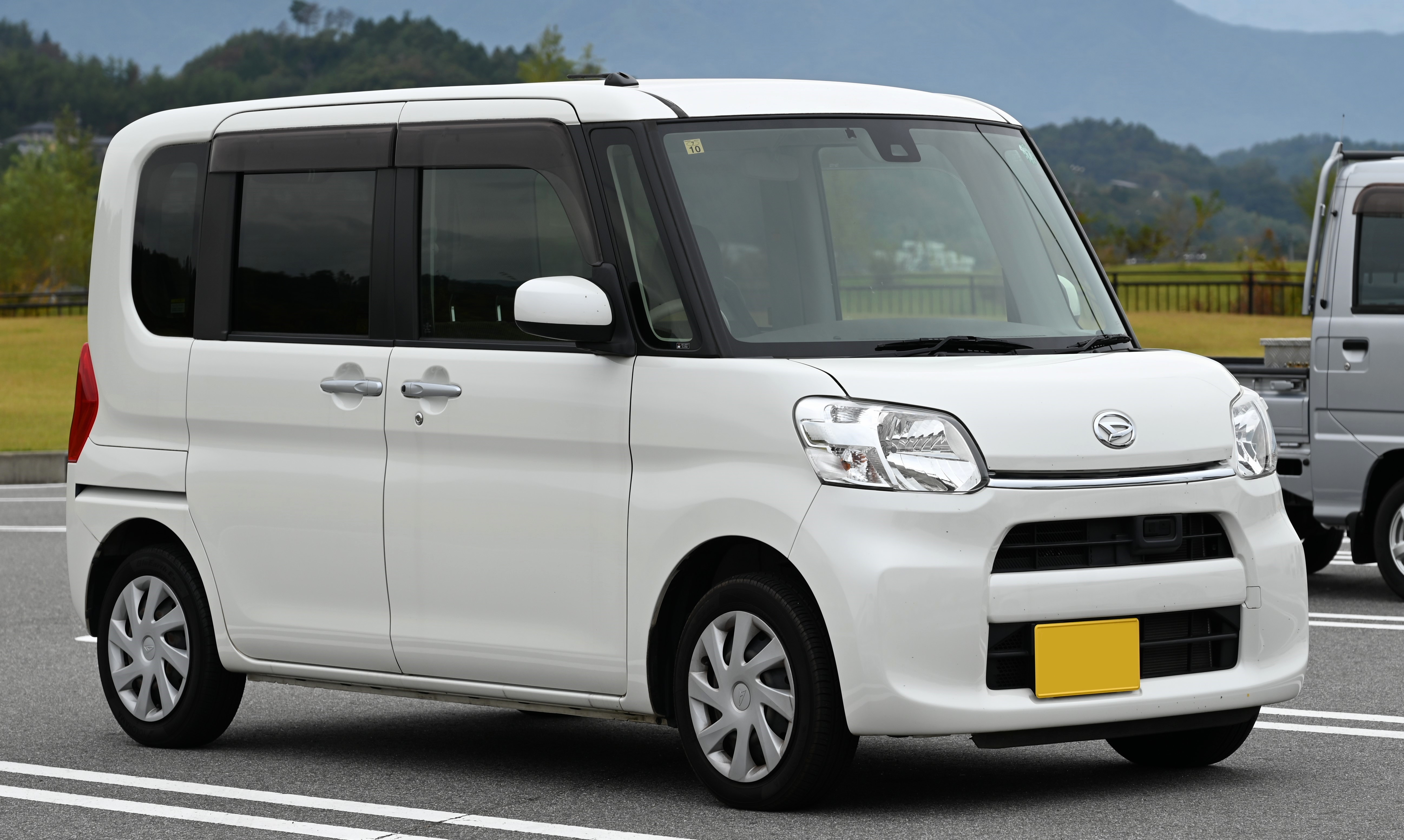
- Tanto X SA (LA600S)

Overview
- Model code: LA600
- Also called: Subaru Chiffon
- Production: October 2013 – June 2019 (Tanto); December 2016 – July 2019 (Chiffon)
- Assembly: Japan: Ryūō, Shiga (Ryūō plant); Japan: Nakatsu, Ōita (Daihatsu Motor Kyushu)

Body and chassis
- Related: Daihatsu Move Canbus (LA800)

Powertrain
- Engine: Petrol: 658 cc KF-VE I3; 658 cc KF-DET turbo I3
- Power output: 38 kW (52 PS) (KF-VE); 47 kW (64 PS) (KF-DET)
- Transmission: CVT

Dimensions
- Wheelbase: 2,455 mm (96.7 in)
- Length: 3,395 mm (133.7 in)
- Width: 1,475 mm (58.1 in)
- Height: 1,750 mm (68.9 in)
- Kerb weight: 920–1,010 kg (2,028–2,227 lb)

Chronology
- Predecessor: Subaru Lucra (Chiffon)

The third-generation Tanto went on sale on 3 October 2013. This generation has sliding doors on both sides (both featuring Daihatsu's "Miracle Open Door" pillar-in-door system); a curved windshield gave the interior a less box-like feel. Compared to the previous Tanto, which was developed mainly with easse of driving in mind, Daihatsu adjusted the ride, steering, and throttle response to improve handling and feedback. Initially the turbocharged engine was only available on the more aggressively styled Tanto Custom, which prompted some criticism from period reviewers. After only two months, Daihatsu added the Tanto X Turbo, using the regular Tanto's design, albeit with front foglights and a chromed grille. The car is also sold by Subaru as the Subaru Chiffon (Japanese: スバル・シフォン, Hepburn: Subaru Shifon) since December 2016 through an OEM agreement.

The Tanto underwent a very light facelift in December 2015; the regular Tanto only received interior upgrades, including water-repellant fabric, while the Custom received a reworked grille and front bumper, and a larger chrome garnish on the rear gate.

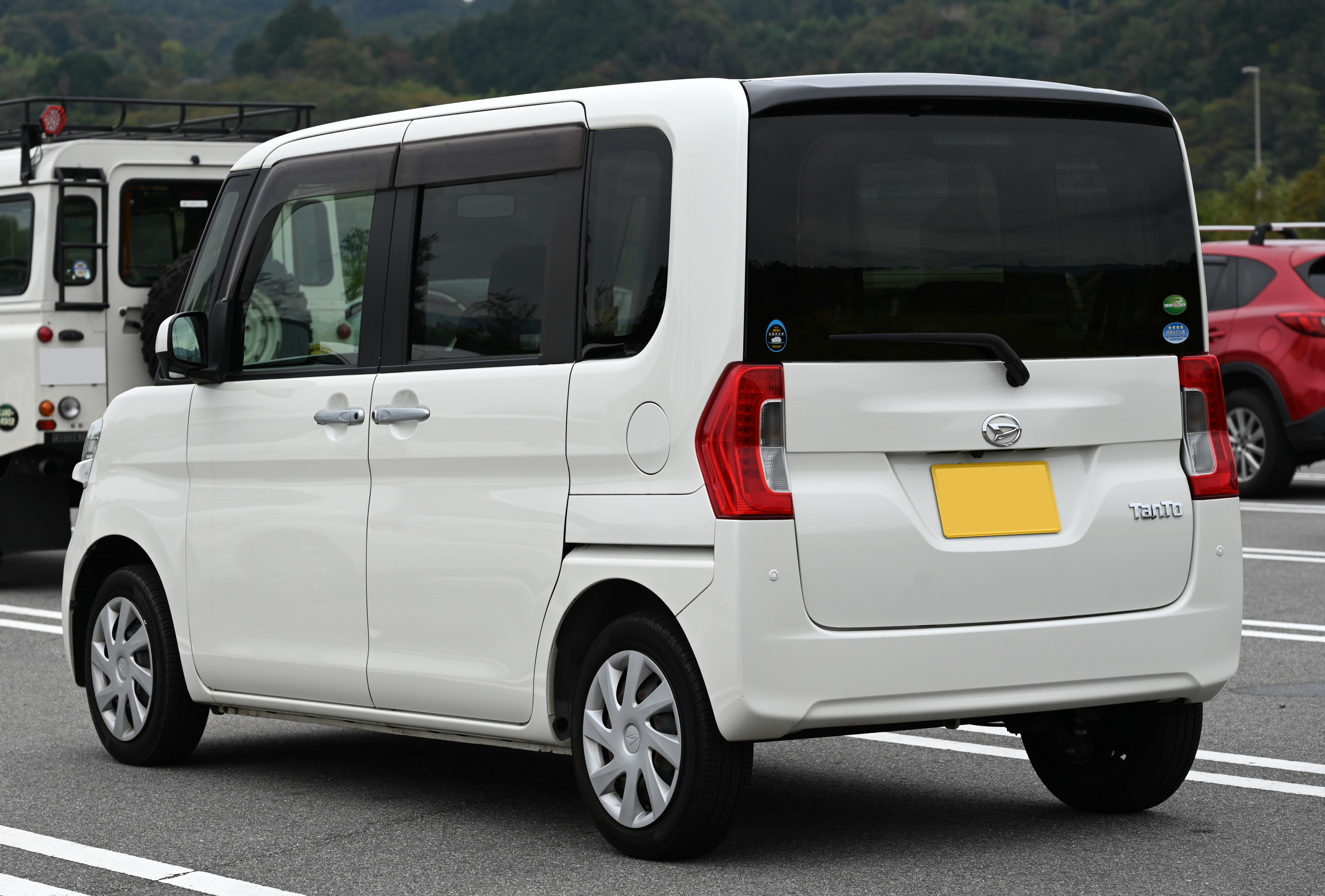
Tanto X SA (LA600S)

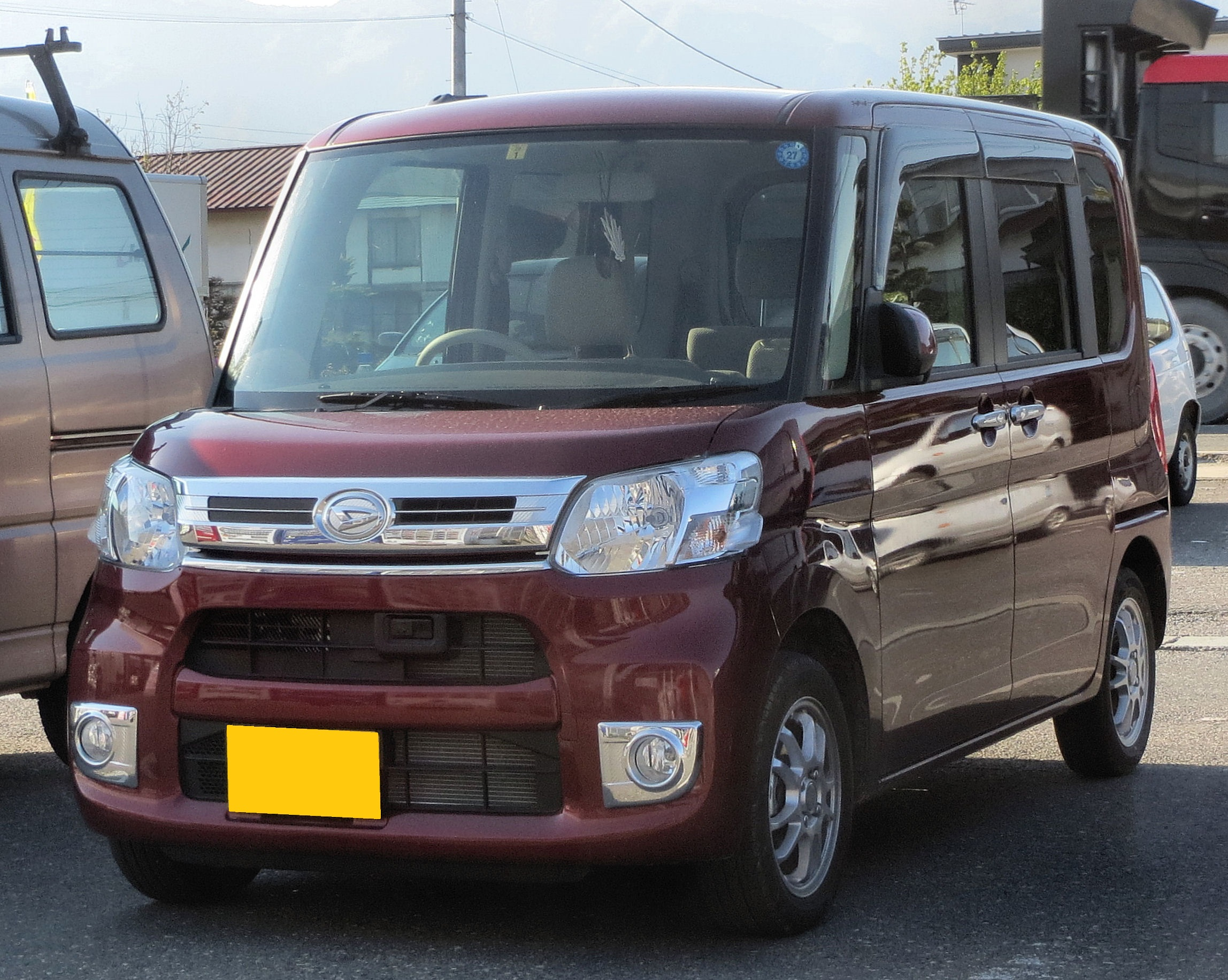
Tanto X Turbo SA (LA600S)

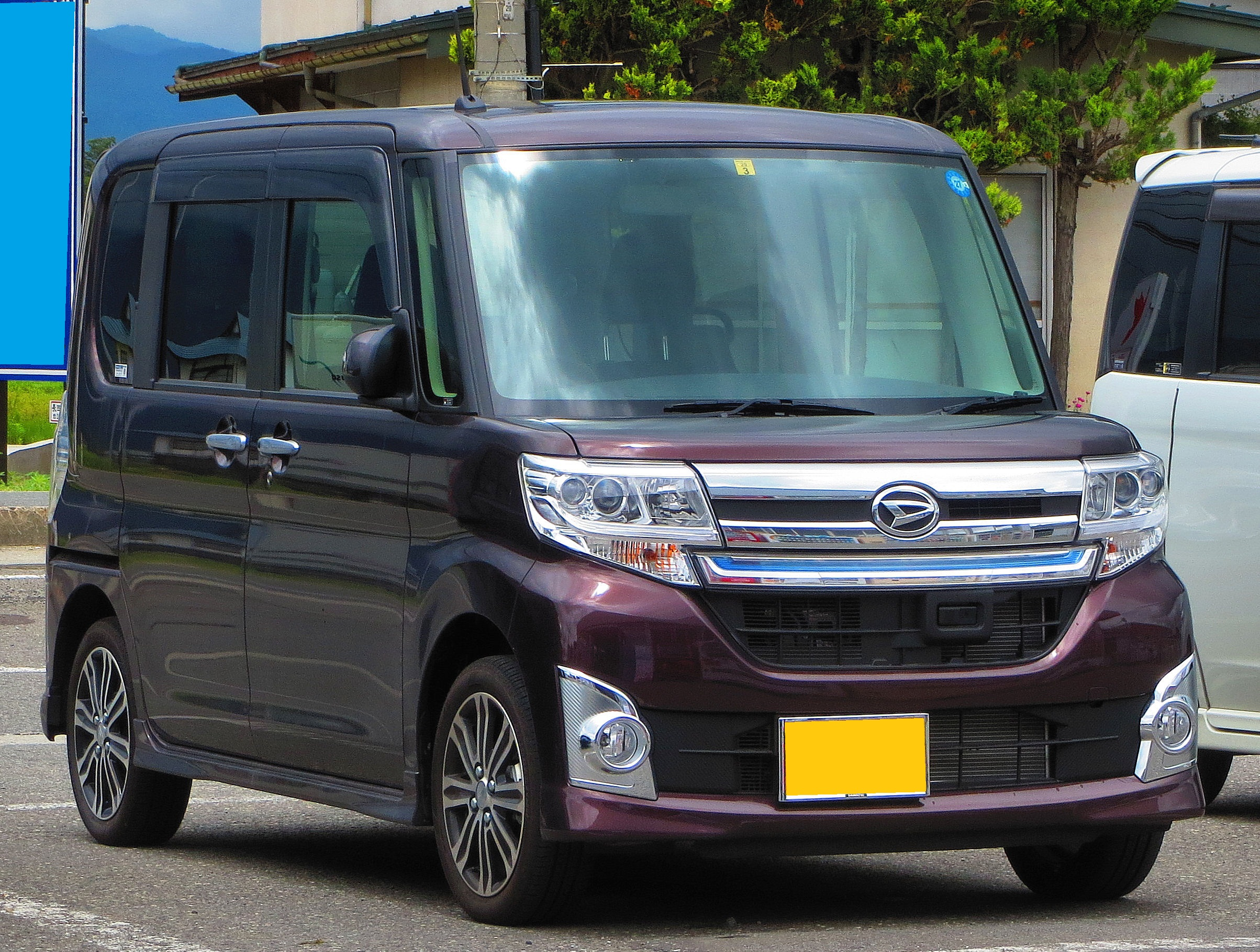
Tanto Custom RS SA 4WD (pre-facelift; LA610S)

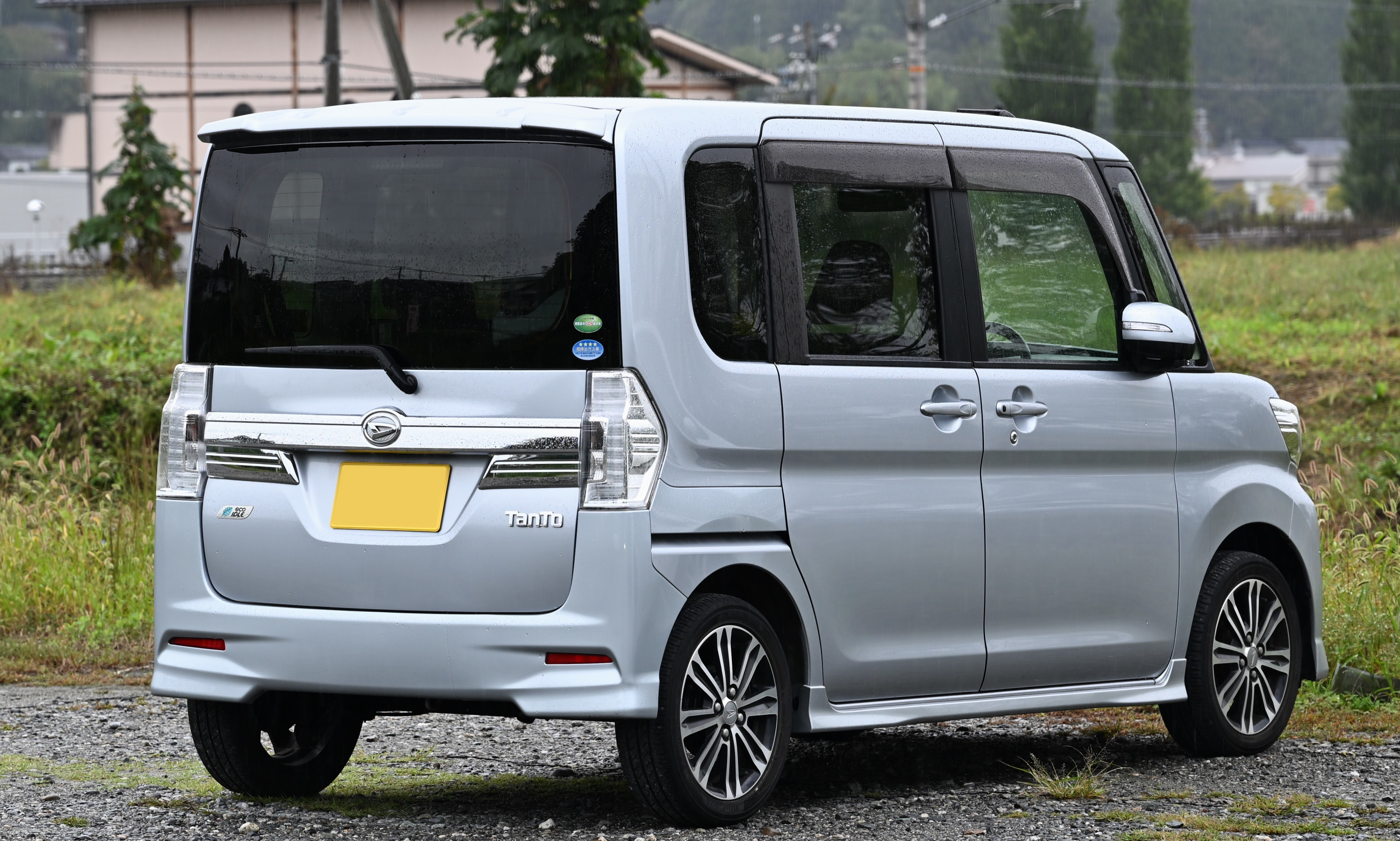
Tanto Custom RS (pre-facelift; LA610S)

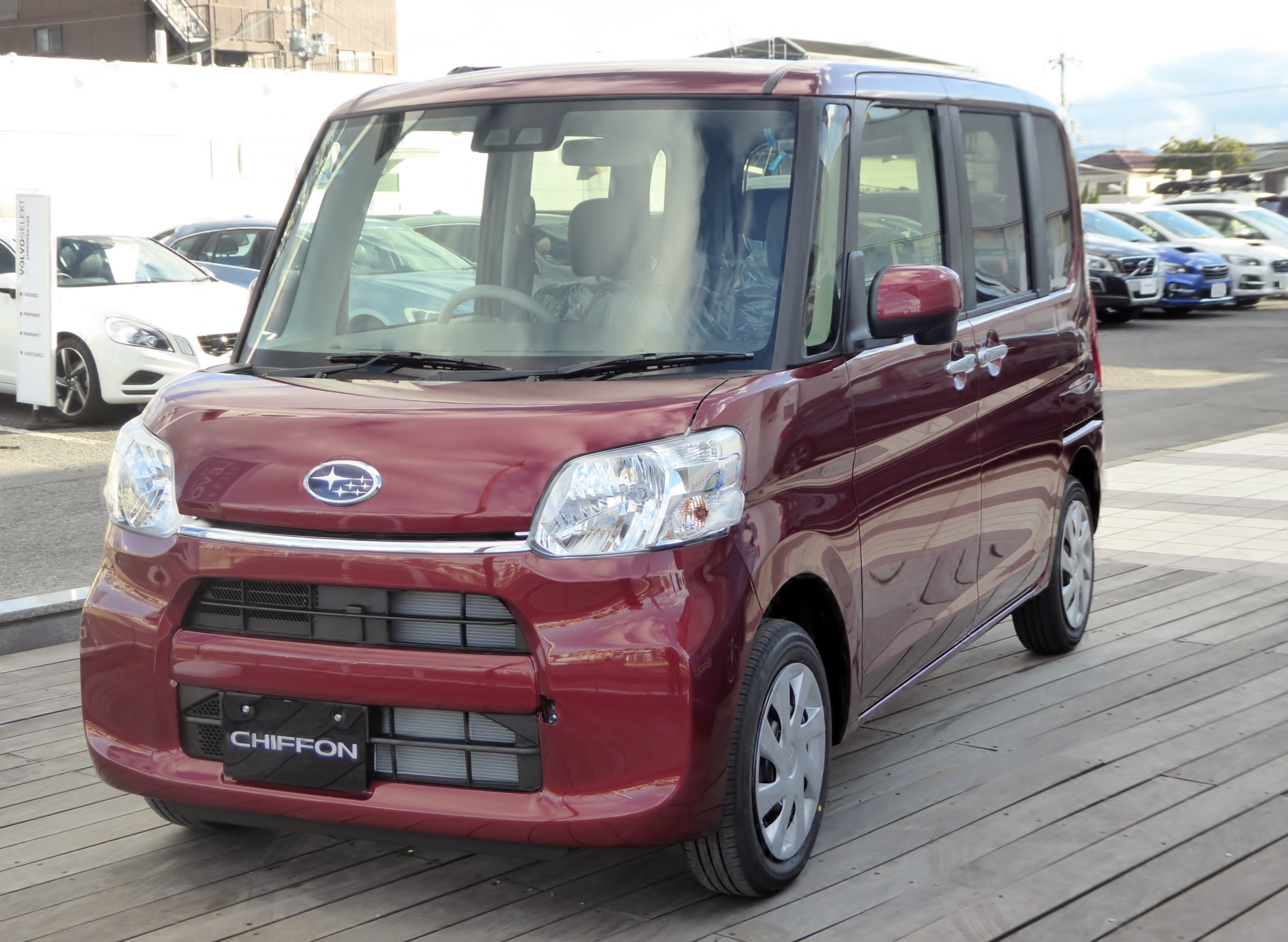
Subaru Chiffon (LA600F)

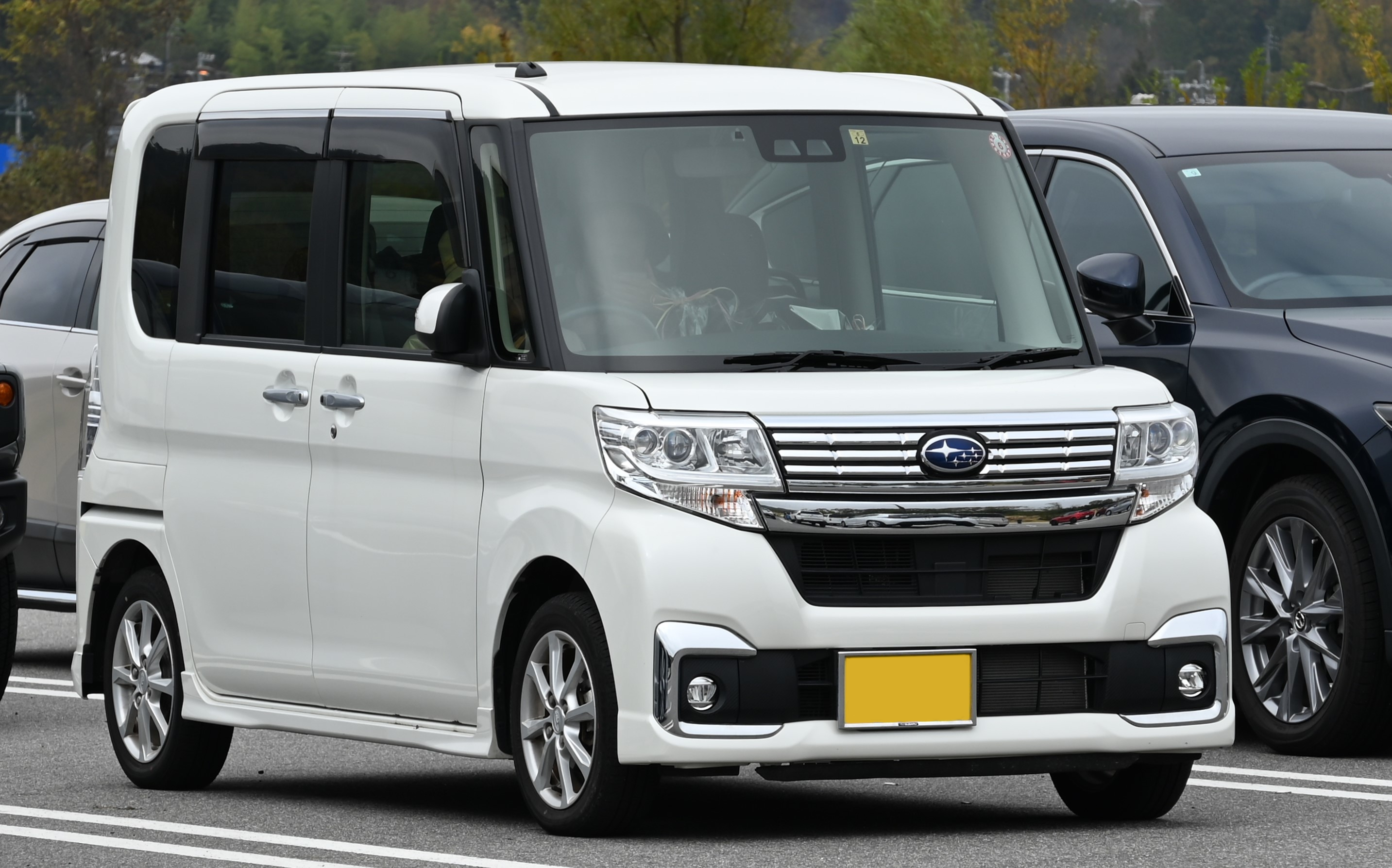
Chiffon Custom R (LA600F)

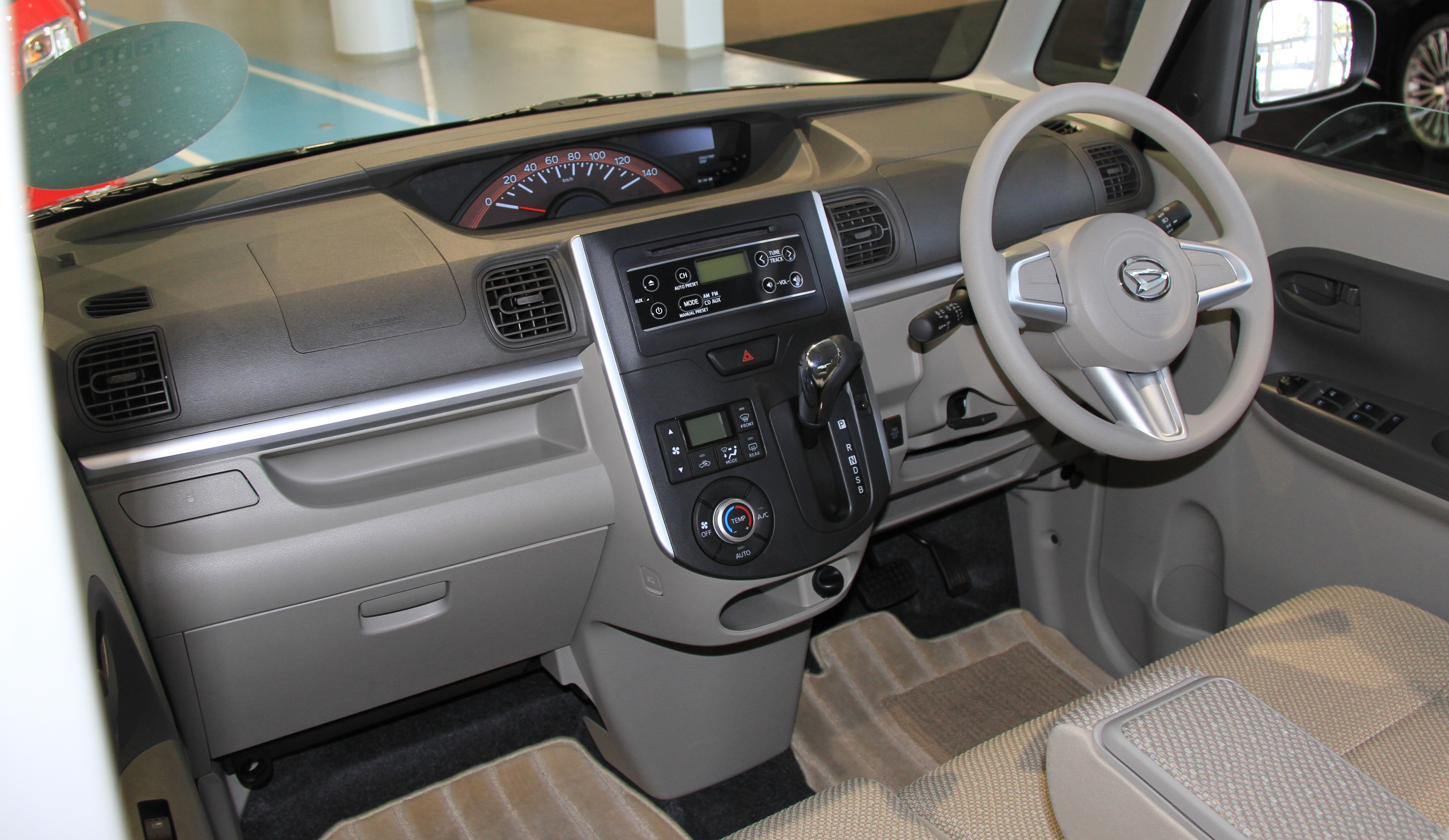
Interior

== Fourth generation (LA650; 2019) ==
Fourth generation
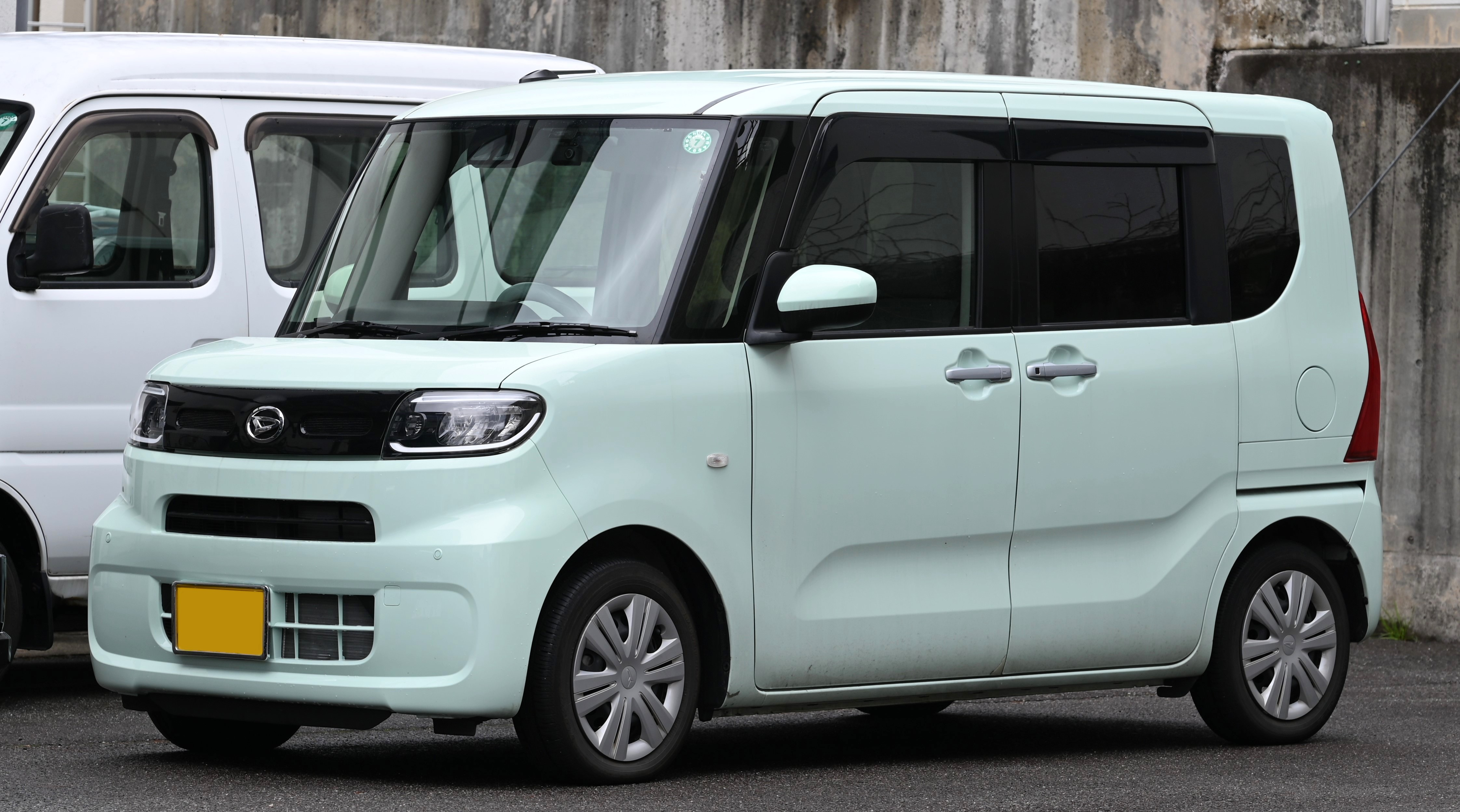
- 2019 Tanto X (LA650S)

Overview
- Model code: LA650
- Also called: Subaru Chiffon
- Production: July 2019 – present
- Assembly: Japan: Ryūō, Shiga (Ryūō plant); Nakatsu, Ōita (Daihatsu Motor Kyushu)
- Designer: Junya Hachisu (facelift Tanto Custom); Kōichi Itō and Gianluca Alba (Tanto FunCross)

Body and chassis
- Platform: Daihatsu New Global Architecture (DNGA)
- Related: Daihatsu Move Canbus (LA850); Daihatsu Taft (LA900)

Powertrain
- Engine: Petrol: 658 cc KF-VE I3; 658 cc KF-DET turbo I3
- Power output: 38 kW (52 PS) (KF-VE); 47 kW (64 PS) (KF-DET)
- Transmission: CVT

Dimensions
- Wheelbase: 2,460 mm (96.9 in)
- Length: 3,395 mm (133.7 in)
- Width: 1,475 mm (58.1 in)
- Height: 1,755–1,775 mm (69.1–69.9 in)
- Kerb weight: 880–1,000 kg (1,940–2,205 lb)

The fourth-generation Tanto went on sale in Japan on 9 July 2019, followed by the second-generation Chiffon on 16 July. It is built on the Daihatsu New Global Architecture (DNGA) platform. The regular model is offered in L, X and X Turbo grade levels, while the Custom model is offered in L, X and RS grade levels. The turbocharged engine option is only available in X Turbo and RS grades.

The Subaru Chiffon sister car was offered in a slightly smaller range: L, G, and GS corresponded to the L, X, and X Turbo. The Chiffon Custom was only offered in R and RS, generally equivalent to the Tanto Custom X and RS. All versions feature a CVT transmission and all except the GS (turbocharged, non-Custom) were available with optional four-wheel drive.

By one month since its launch, the fourth-generation Tanto had been ordered for approximately 37,000 units, nearly three times the monthly sales target of 12,500 units.

The Tanto Custom received a facelift on 3 October 2022. At the same time, the crossover-styled variant called Tanto FunCross was also added to the lineup. The facelifted Chiffon later followed on 13 October.

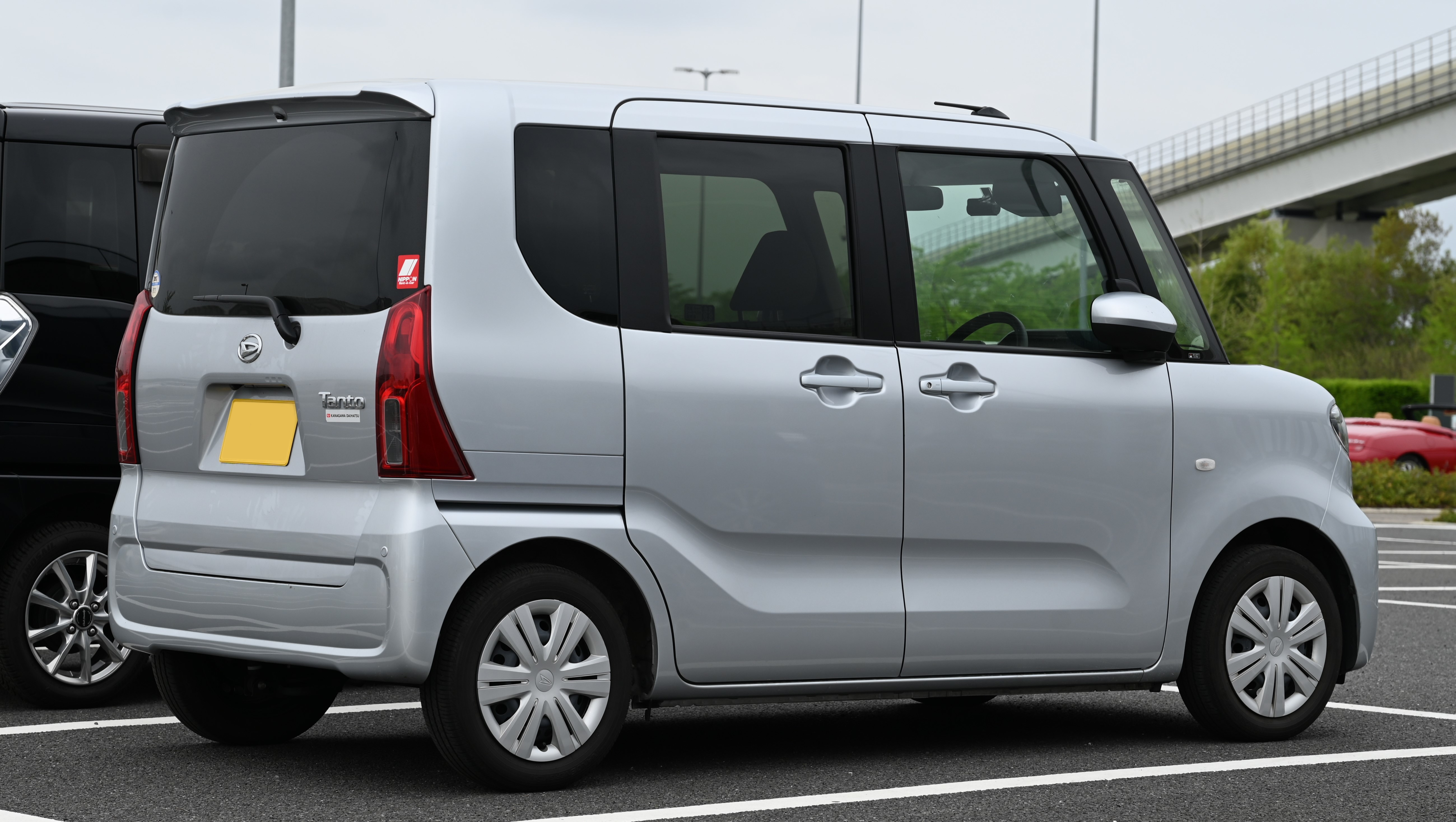
2019 Tanto X (LA650S)

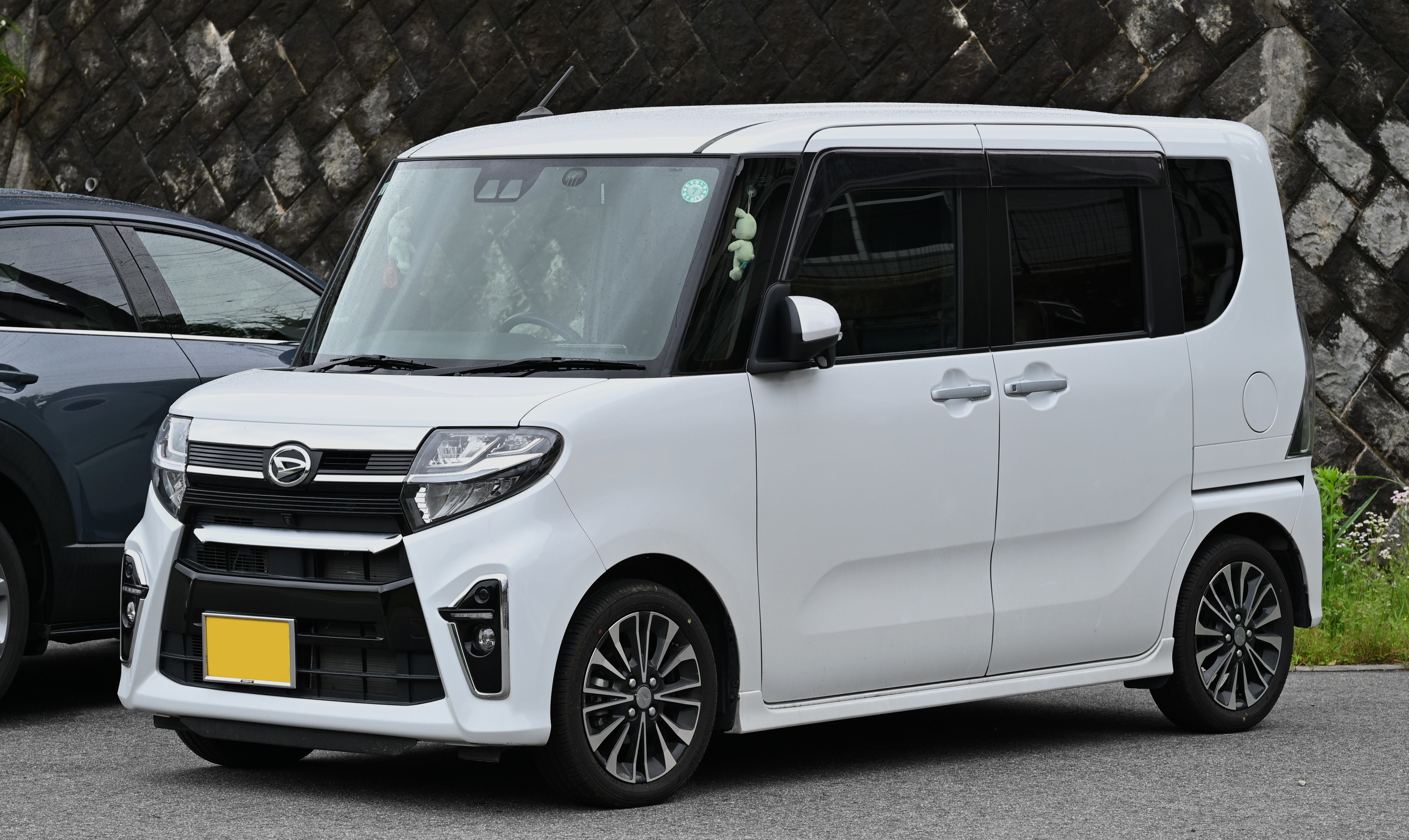
2019 Tanto Custom RS (LA650S, pre-facelift)

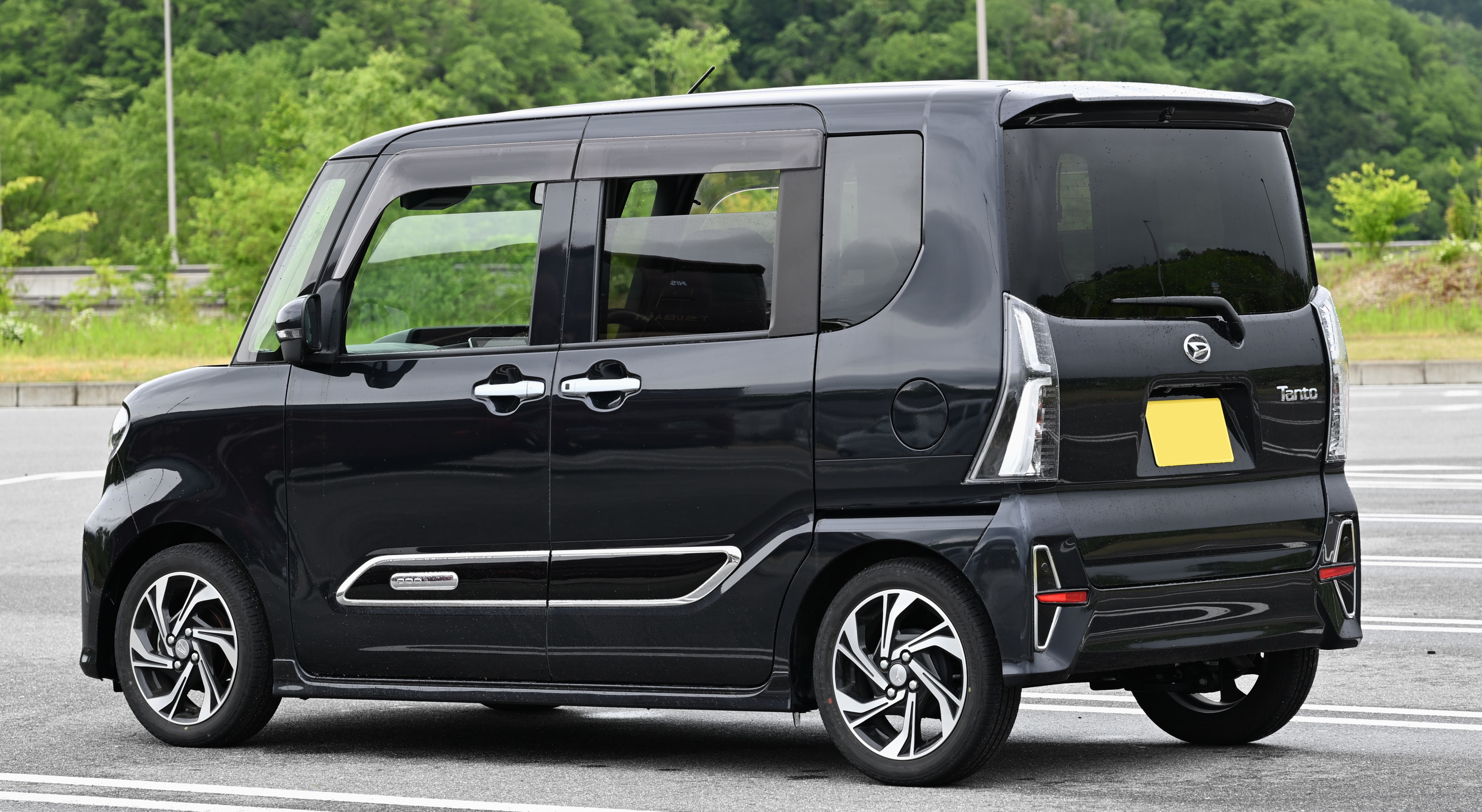
2019 Tanto Custom X (LA650S, pre-facelift)

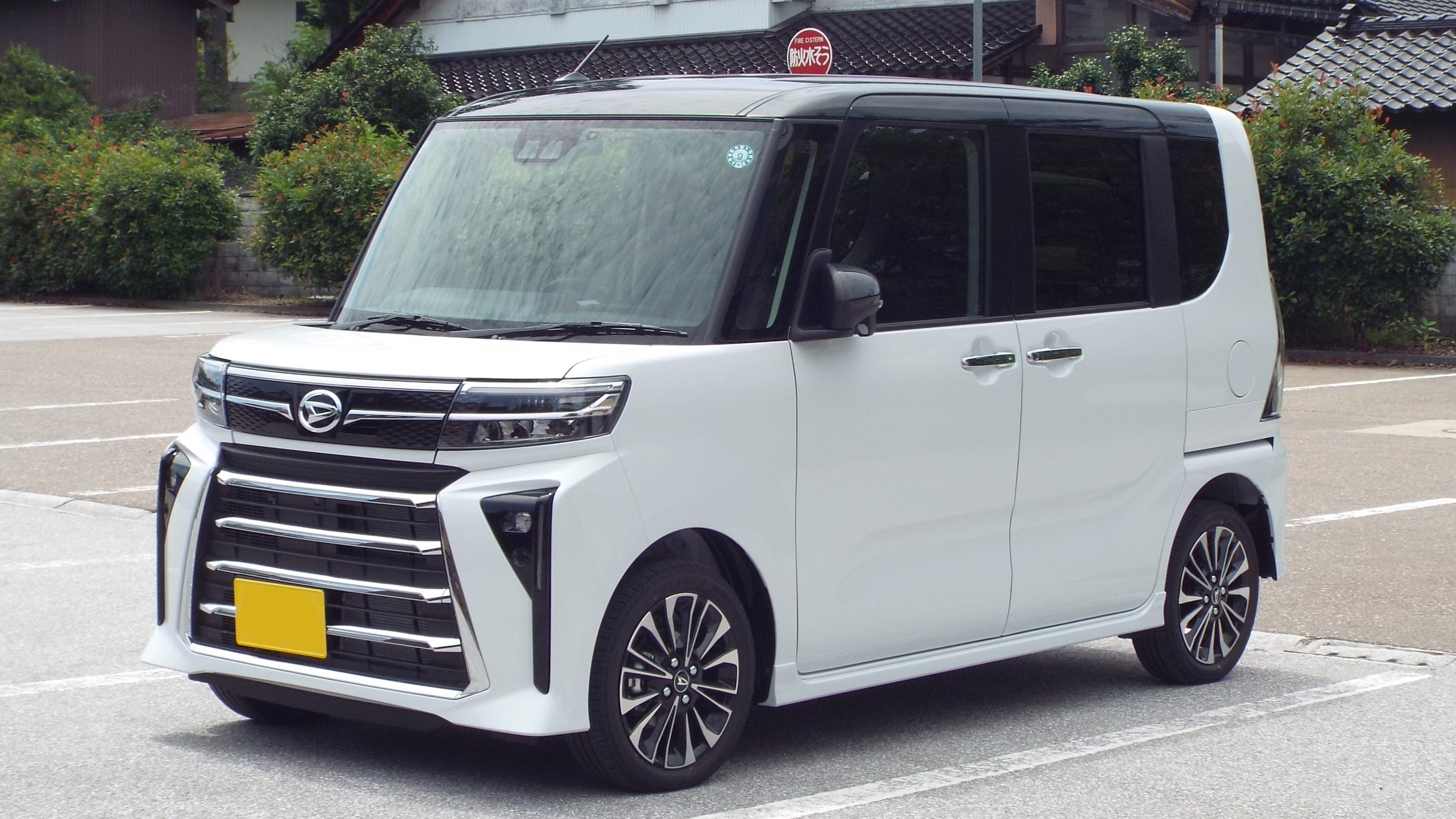
2022 Tanto Custom RS (LA650S, facelift)

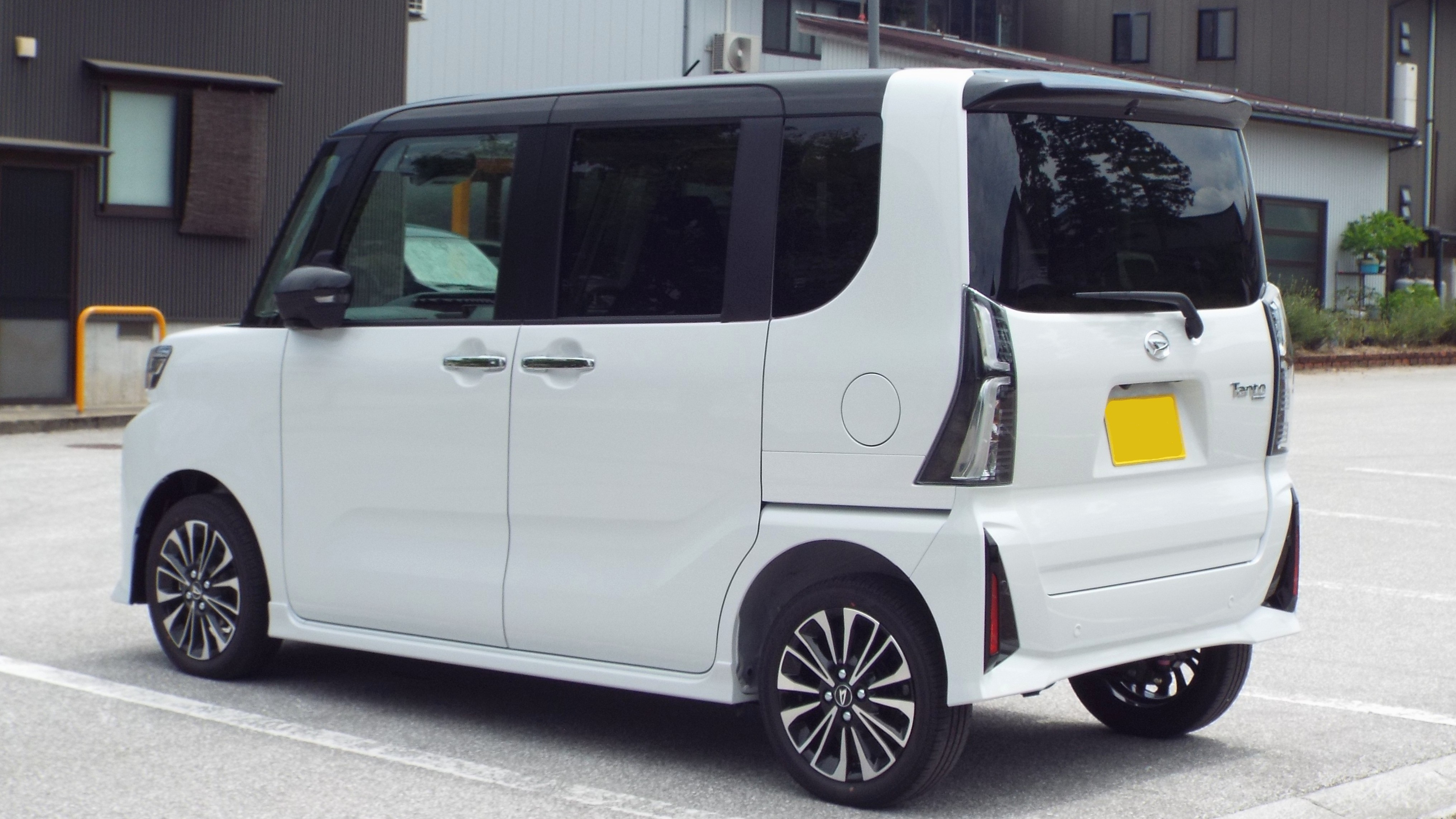
2022 Tanto Custom RS (LA650S, facelift)

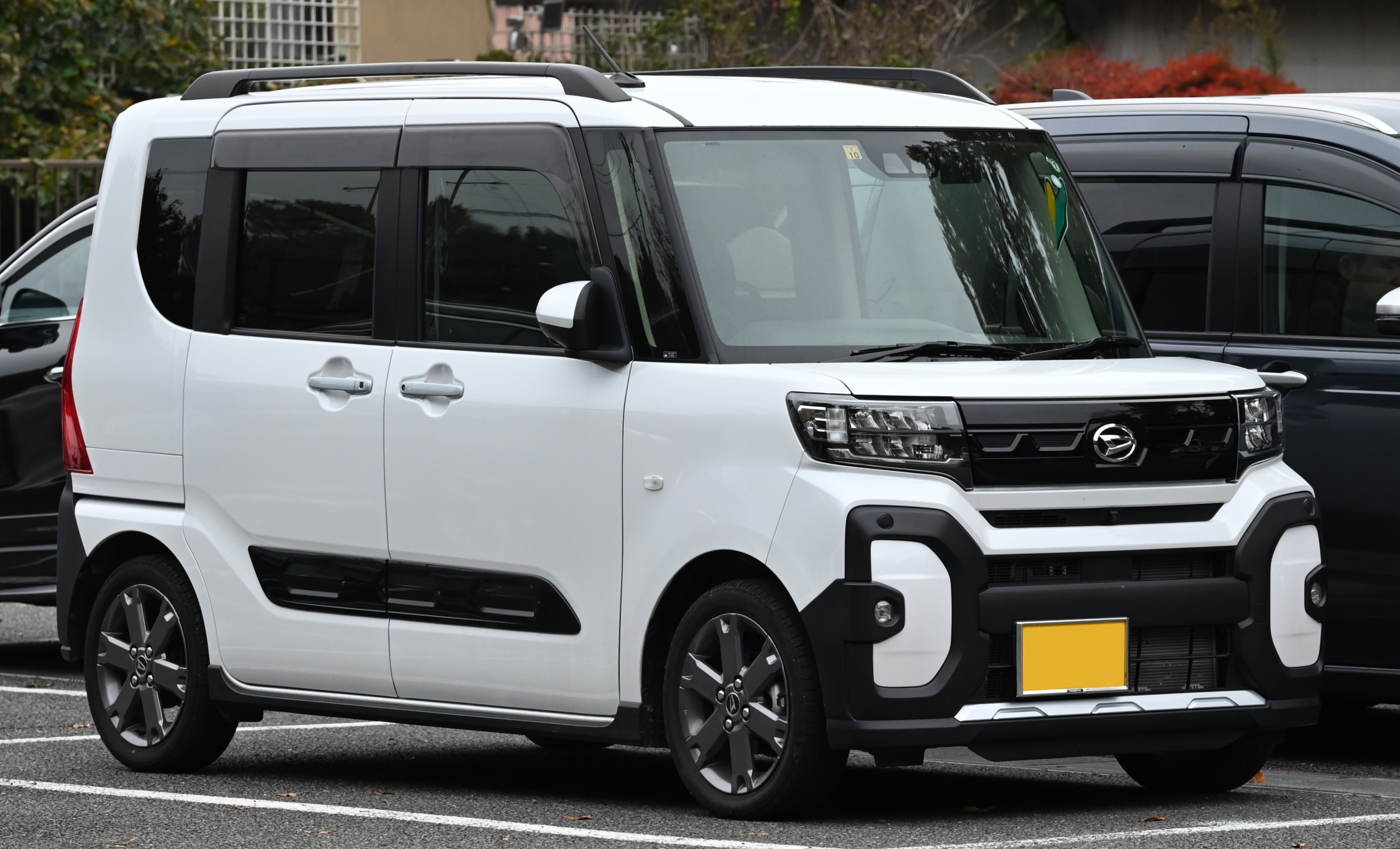
2022 Tanto FunCross Turbo (LA650S)

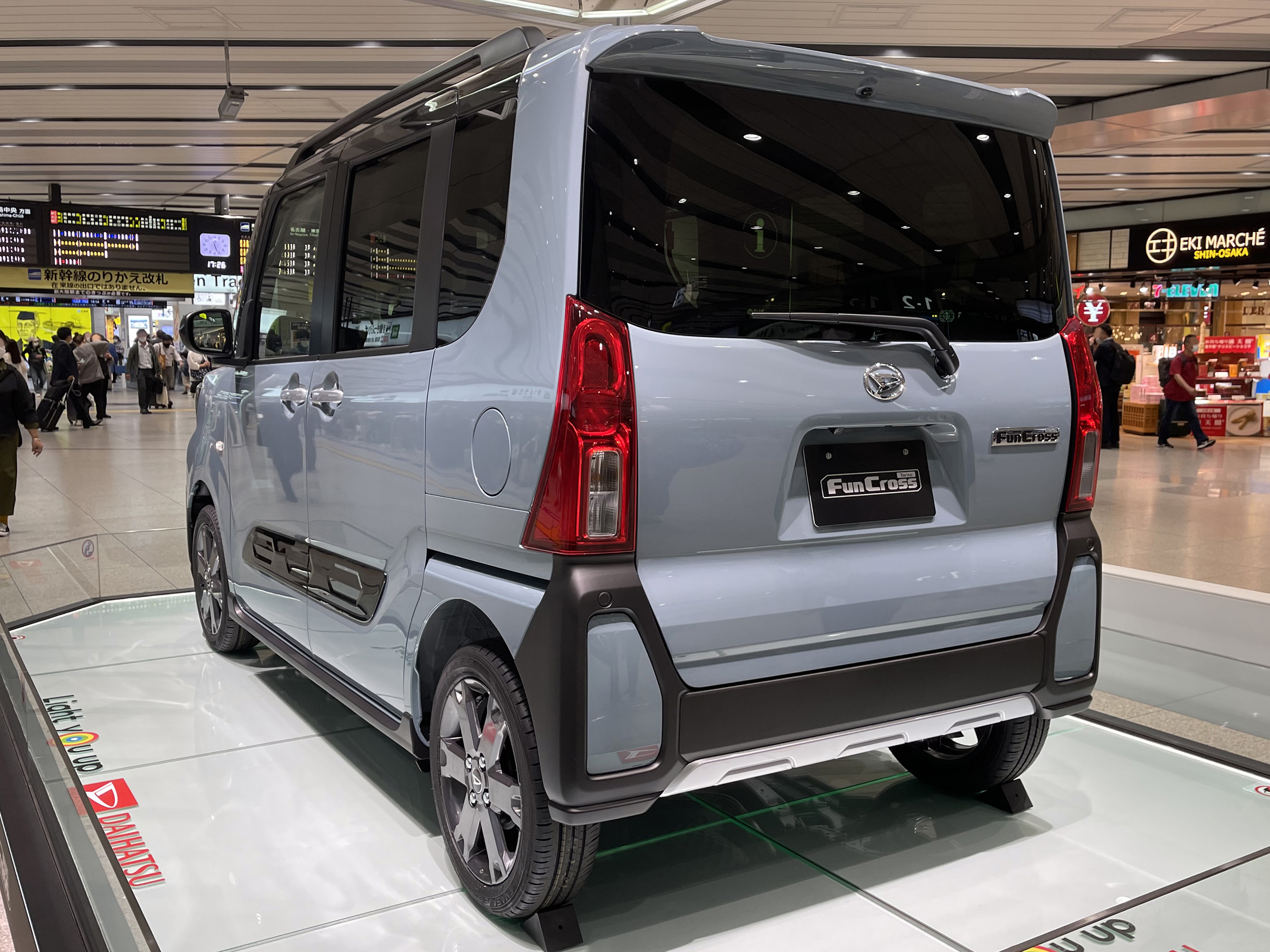
2022 Tanto FunCross Turbo (LA650S)

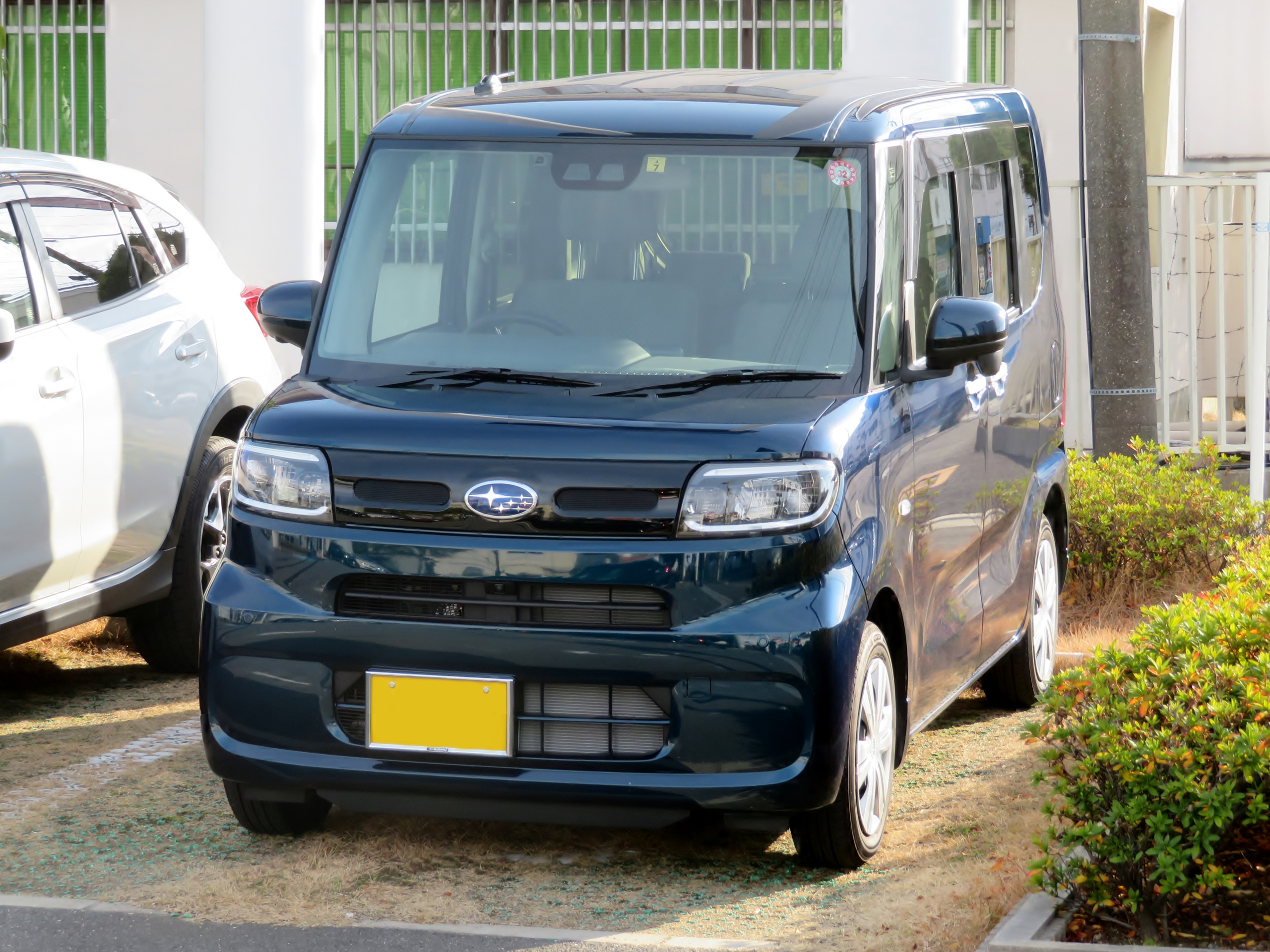
2019 Chiffon G SA (LA650F)

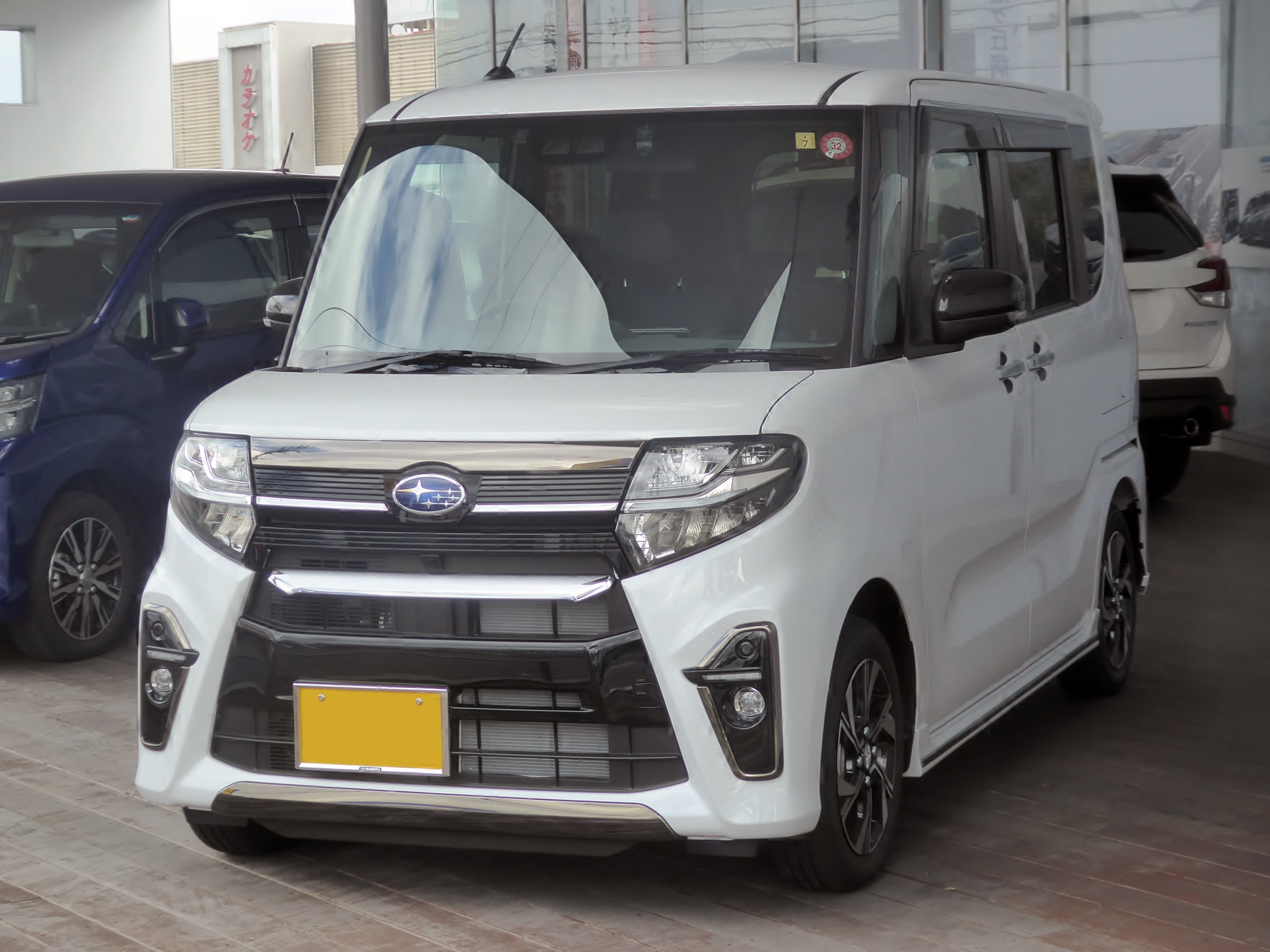
2019 Chiffon Custom R SA 4WD (LA660F, pre-facelift)

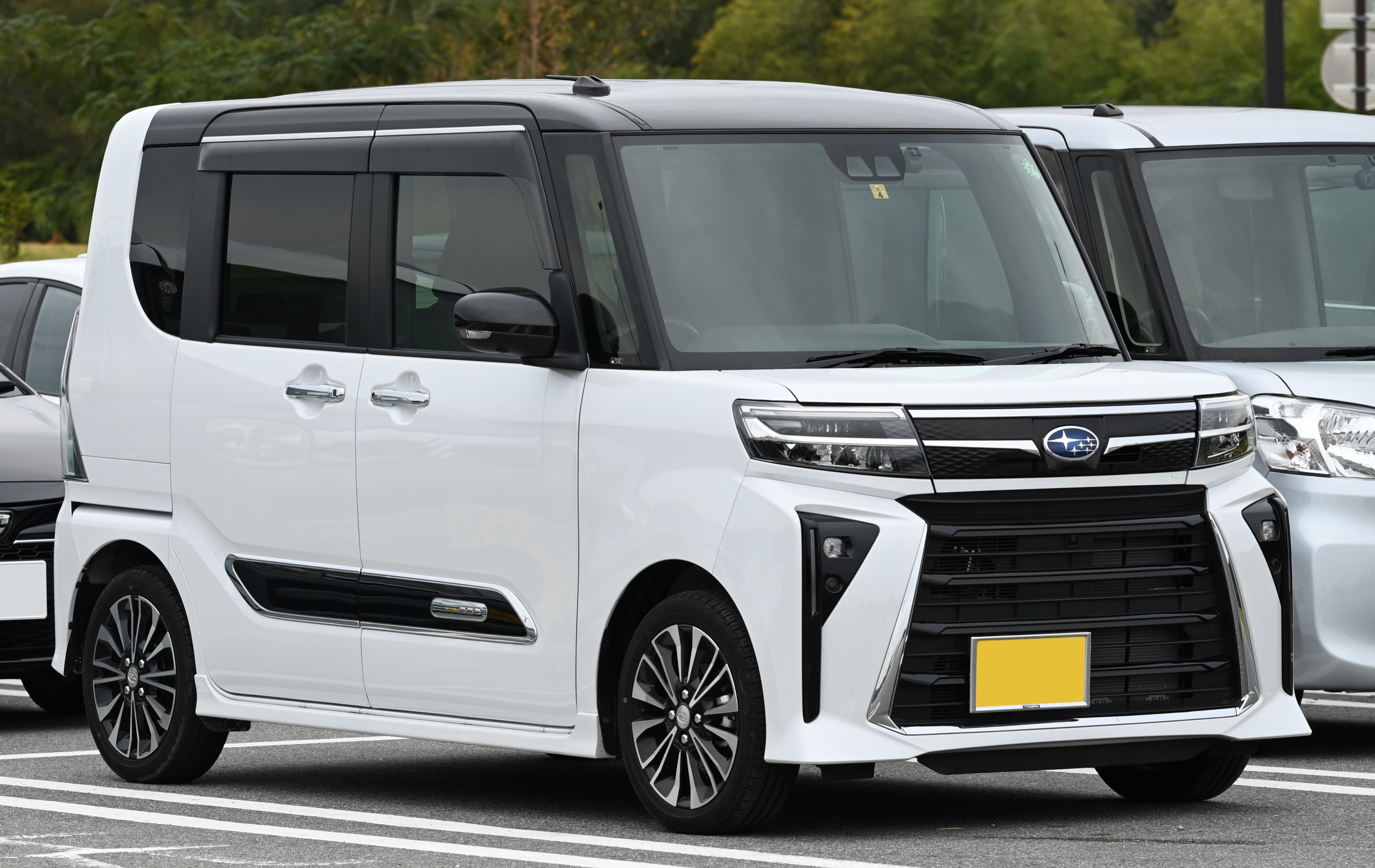
2022 Chiffon Custom RS (LA650F, facelift)

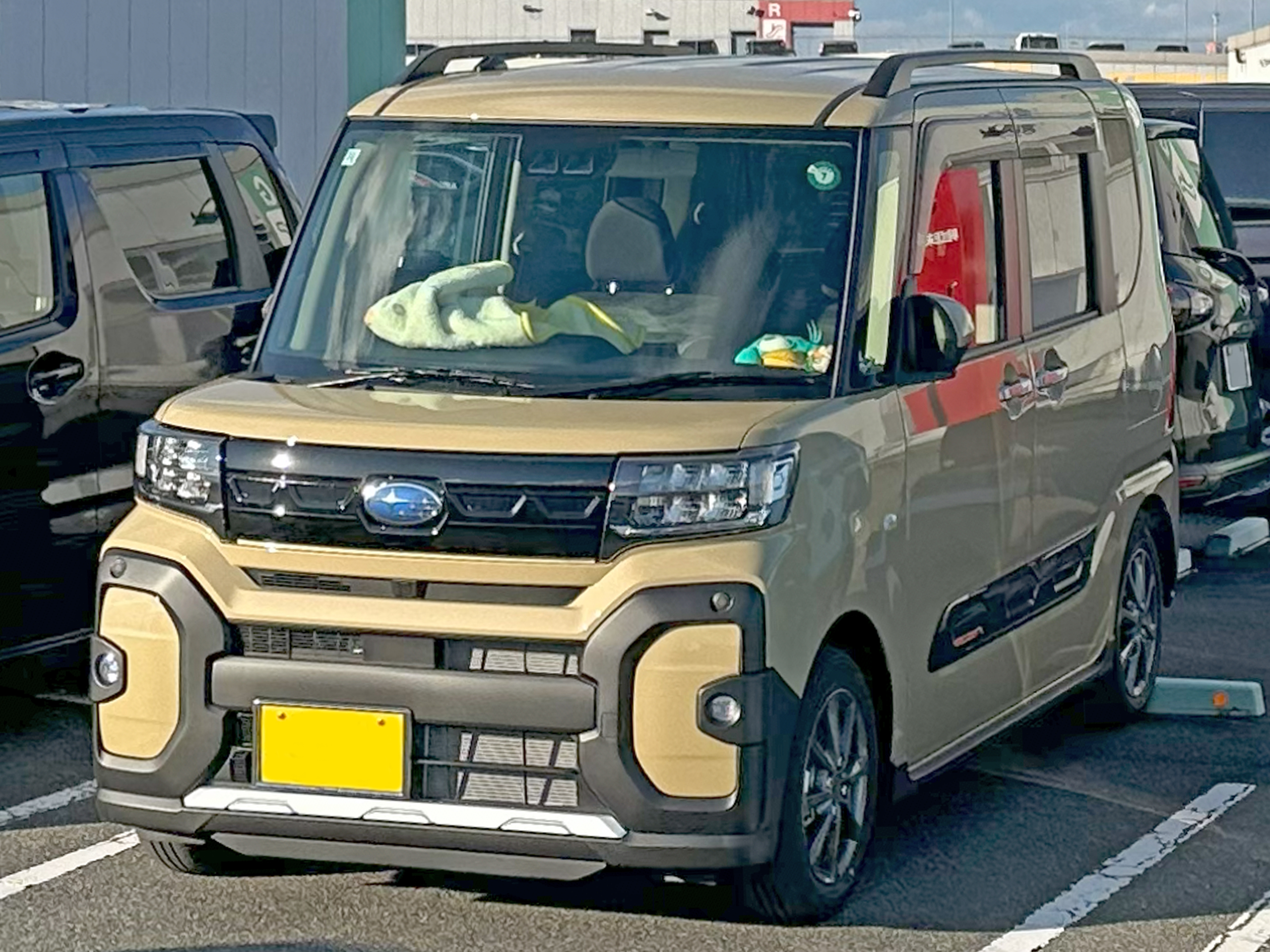
Subaru CHIFFON TRY

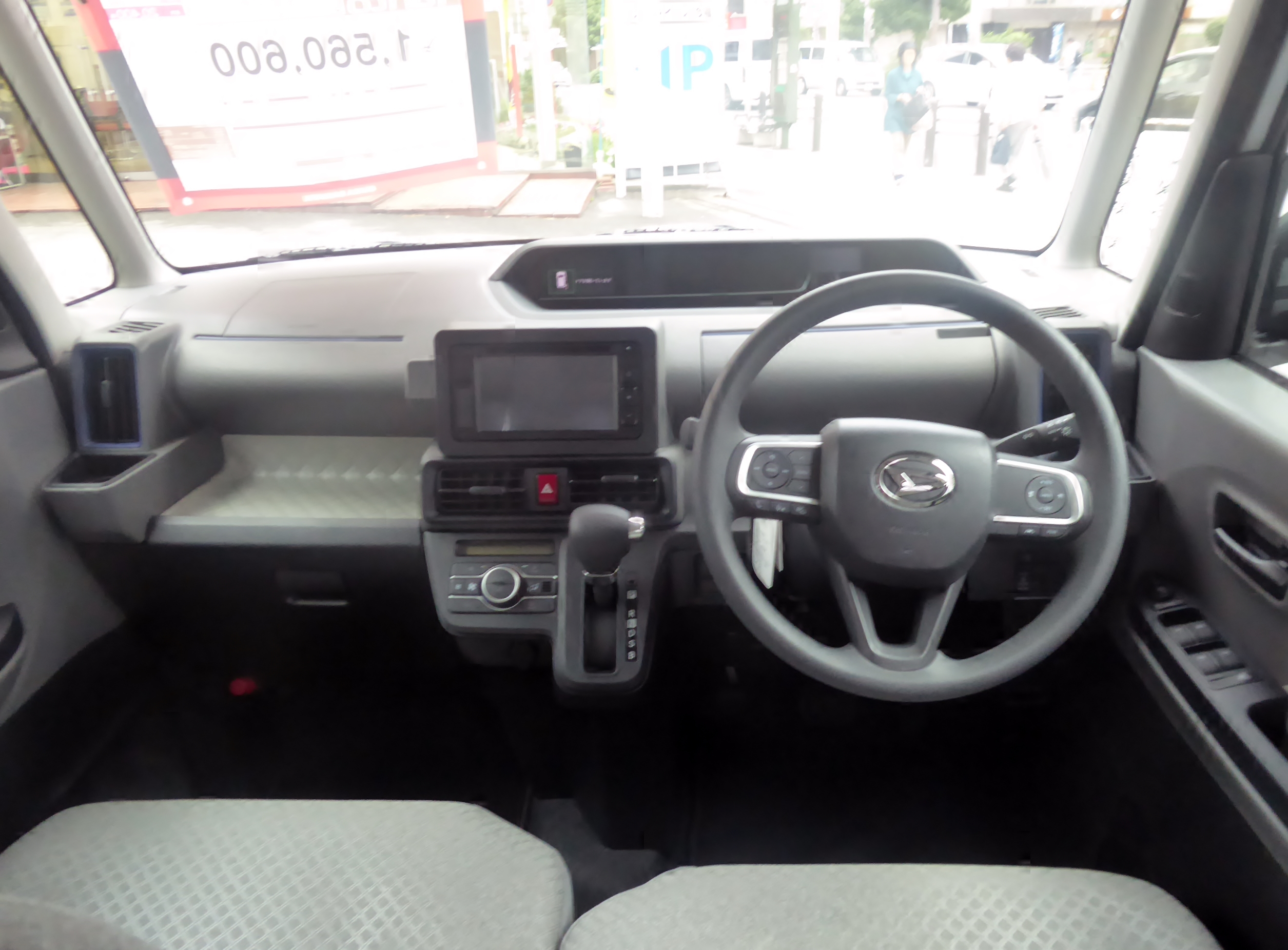
Interior

== Sales ==
As of June 2025, the Tanto series had been sold 3 million units, the third model to do so after the Mira and Move.

Year	Japan
2003	7,741
2004	91,933
2005	92,057
2006	106,410
2007	100,217
2008	159,322
2009	144,814
2010	140,161
2011	111,748
2012	148,146
2013	135,702
2014	232,694
2015	157,753
2016	155,999
2017	141,312
2018	136,557
2019	175,292
2020	129,681
2021	116,912
2022	107,749
2023	159,392
2024	93,759
