= She: Best of Best =

Greatest hits album by Shizuka Kudo
- Released: December 16, 1996
- Genre: Pop
- Length: 120:25
- Label: Pony Canyon

Shizuka Kudo chronology
Doing (1996)	She: Best of Best (1996)	Dress (1997)

She: Best of Best is the seventh compilation album by Japanese singer Shizuka Kudo. It was released on December 16, 1996, through Pony Canyon. The first disc includes songs from Kudo's Tsugutoshi Gotō-produced era albums, while the second disc features songs from Kudo's self-produced records. Disc 2 contains a new song written specifically for the album, entitled "Hot Winter".

== Commercial performance ==
She: Best of Best debuted at number eight on the Oricon Albums Chart, with 69,000 units sold. It dropped to number seventeen on its second week, with 43,000 copies sold. It fell outside of the top twenty on its third week, ranking at number 26. On its fourth charting week, it ranked at number 36 and on its fifth week on the Oricon Albums Chart it ranked at number 60. On its sixth it ranked at number 68. She: Best of Best charted in the top 100 for seven weeks, selling a reported total of 142,000 copies during its chart run, making it Kudo's last compilation album to clear the 100,000 sales mark and receive a certification from the Recording Industry Association of Japan.

== Track listing ==
Disc 1 All tracks composed by Tsugutoshi Gotō.
No.	Title	Lyrics	Arranger(s)	Length
1.	"Fu-ji-tsu"	Miyuki Nakajima	Tsugutoshi Gotō	3:48
2.	"Arashi no Sugao"	Yoshiko Miura	Gotō	3:32
3.	"Kōsa ni Fukarete"	Nakajima	Gotō	3:48
4.	"Metamorphose"	Gorō Matsui	Gotō; Satoshi Kadokura	4:15
5.	"Dōkoku"	Nakajima	Gotō; Naoki Takao	4:48
6.	"Wine Hitokuchi no Uso" (ワインひとくちの嘘, "Lying After One Sip of Wine")	Matsui	Gotō	4:50
7.	"Shōko o Misete" (証拠をみせて, "Show Me Proof")	Nakajima	Gotō	4:37
8.	"Garasu no Sanctuary" (硝子のサンクチュアリ, Garasu no Sankuchuari, "Glass Sanctuary")	Shintarō Hirai	Gotō	3:54
9.	"Sunao ni Itte" (素直に言って, "Tell Me Honestly")	Aeri	Draw4	6:47
10.	"Furueru Ichibyō" (震える1秒, "One Second Shiver")	Miura	Gotō	3:44
11.	"Kiri no Kanata e" (霧の彼方へ, "Beyond the Fog")	Miura	Gotō	4:17
12.	"Tasogare ga Yoru ni Naru" (黄昏が夜になる, "When Tusk Turns to Night")	Sayako Morimoto	Gotō	5:05
13.	"Kawaita Hana" (渇いた花, "Parched Flower")	Miura	Gotō; Takao	4:09
14.	"Sono Ato wa Ame no Naka" (そのあとは雨の中, "Afterwards, in the Rain")	Nakajima	Gotō; Takao	5:08
Total length:				62:42

Disc 2 All lyrics written by Aeri, except "Gekijō" by Miyuki Nakajima.
No.	Title	Music	Arranger(s)	Length
1.	"Blue Rose"	Takashi Tsushimi	Taisuke Sawachika	4:38
2.	"Jaguar Line"	Masaya Ozeki	Ichirō Hada	4:06
3.	"Ice Rain"	Tsushimi	Satoshi Kadokura	6:00
4.	"Moon Water"	Arata Tanimoto	Sawachika	5:09
5.	"7"	Toshiaki Matsumoto	Akihisa Matsūra	5:44
6.	"Chō"	Naoyuki Fujī; Aeri; Matsūra	Matsūra	5:08
7.	"Yū"	Hideya Nakazaki	Nakazaki	4:51
8.	"Gekijō"	Nakajima	Ichizō Seo	4:36
9.	"I'm Nothing to You"	Matsumoto	Hada	6:30
10.	"Wing"	Matsumoto	Sawachika	4:30
11.	"Hot Winter"	Matsumoto	Matsūra	6:31
Total length:				57:43

== Charts ==
Chart (1996)	Peak position
Japan Weekly Albums (Oricon)	8

== Certifications ==
Region	Certification	Certified units/sales
Japan (RIAJ)	Gold	142,000
