= 20th Anniversary B-side collection =

Compilation album by Shizuka Kudo
- Released: March 5, 2008
- Recorded: 1987–2007
- Genre: Pop
- Length: 155:55
- Label: Pony Canyon

Shizuka Kudo chronology
Shizuka Kudo 20th Anniversary the Best (2007)	20th Anniversary B-side collection (2008)	My Precious: Shizuka Sings Songs of Miyuki (2008)

20th Anniversary B-side collection is the twelfth compilation album by Japanese singer Shizuka Kudo. It was released in honor of Kudo's 20th anniversary on March 5, 2008, through Pony Canyon.

== Background ==
The compilation album was released as the third and final release celebrating Kudo's 20th anniversary of her solo debut. The compilation includes thirty-four out of forty of Kudo's B-sides released since her solo debut single "Kindan no Telepathy" (1987), all the way to "Amayo no Tsuki ni" (2007). Some of the songs were previously included on studio albums and other compilations, while others are making their first appearance on a proper album.

The limited edition of the album comes with a DVD including a digest of eight songs performed on Kudo's Shibuya-AX concert held on August 31, 2007 in celebration of her 20th anniversary.

== Commercial performance ==
20th Anniversary B-side collection debuted at number 94 on the Oricon Albums Chart, where it charted for only one week, selling 2,000 copies sold.

== Track listing ==
Disc 1 All music composed by Tsugutoshi Gotō.
No.	Title	Lyrics	Arranger(s)	Length
1.	"Ai ga Itai Yoru" (愛が痛い夜, "Nights When Love Hurts")	Yasushi Akimoto	Tsugutoshi Gotō	4:03
2.	"If"	Yoshiko Miura	Gotō	3:46
3.	"Yoake ni Miokurarete" (夜明けに見送られて, "Seen Off by the Daybreak")	Akimoto	Gotō	4:30
4.	"Natsu ga Kureta Miracle" (夏がくれたミラクル, Natsu ga Kureta Mirakuru, "A Summer Miracle")	Gorō Matsui	Gotō	3:55
5.	"Gunshū" (群衆, "Crowd")	Miyuki Nakajima	Gotō	4:27
6.	"Non-Stop"	Matsui	Gotō	3:51
7.	"Eien no Bōhatei" (永遠の防波堤, "The Mole of Eternity")	Keiko Asō	Gotō	4:26
8.	"Akiko" (秋子)	Nakajima	Gotō	3:54
9.	"Serenade" (セレナーデ, Serenāde)	Matsui	Gotō	4:59
10.	"Beautiful World"	Miura	Draw4	4:15
11.	"Tel..Me"	Nakajima	Draw4	4:00
12.	"Ano Sakamichi" (あの坂道, "That Hill")	Aeri	Gotō	4:23
13.	"Manatsu no Shinkirō" (真夏の蜃気楼, "A Midsummer Mirage")	Aeri	Gotō	4:48
14.	"Riaru" (Ri・a・ru, "Real")	Aeri	Gotō	4:46
15.	"Ryūsei" (流星, "Shooting Star")	Aeri	Gotō	5:04
16.	"Hatachi no Scenario" (20才のシナリオ, Hatachi no Shinario, "Scenario of a 20-year-old")	Aeri	Gotō	4:59
17.	"Minamikaze!! Fuku Mae ni..." (南風!!吹く前に…, "Before!! the Southern Wind Blows...")	Aeri	Gotō; Naoki Takao	4:25
18.	"Call" (コール, Kōru)	Nakajima	Gotō; Takao	4:32
Total length:				1:19:03

Disc 2
No.	Title	Writer(s)	Arranger(s)	Length
1.	"Shūmaku" (終幕, "The End")	Fumiko Okada; Gotō	Gotō; Takao	5:08
2.	"Chotto Shita Guilty" (ちょっとしたGUILTY, "Slightly Guilty")	Matsui; Gotō	Gotō	5:12
3.	"Door"	Aeri; Takashi Tsushimi	Taisuke Sawachika	4:41
4.	"Party"	Aeri; Tsushimi	Sawachika	4:08
5.	"Still Water"	Aeri; Arata Tanimoto	Sawachika	4:55
6.	"Hachigatsu..." (8月…, "August...")	Aeri	Sawachika	4:54
7.	"Nagai Kami" (長い髪, "Long Hair")	Aeri; Toshiaki Matsumoto	Akihisa Matsūra	4:47
8.	"Break"	Aeri; Tanimoto	Matsūra	4:56
9.	"Niji" (虹, Rainbow)	Aeri; Hatake	Hatake	4:50
10.	"Wish"	Aeri; Sawachika	Sawachika	4:24
11.	"In the Sky"	ЯK	Sawachika	4:33
12.	"Piece of a Star"	ЯK	Sawachika	3:48
13.	"Simple"	Hideyuki Obata	Obata	5:12
14.	"Urunda Heart" (潤んだハート, Urunda Hāto, "Dim Heart")	Aeri; Masaki Iehara	Sadahiro Nakano	4:57
15.	"Powder Snow"	Aeri; Jin Nakamura	Nakamura	4:58
16.	"Sonzai" (存在, "Existence")	Matsui; H-Wonder	H-Wonder	4:39
Total length:				1:16:02

Disc 3 – DVD
No.	Title	Length
1.	"Kindan no Telepathy"
2.	"Fu-ji-tsu"
3.	"Blue Rose"
4.	"Mechakucha ni Naite Shimaitai"
5.	"Arashi no Sugao"
6.	"Blue Velvet"
7.	"Dōkoku"
8.	"Daite Kuretara Ii no ni"

== Charts ==
Chart (2008)	Peak position
Japan Weekly Albums (Oricon)	94
