= Yukigasa =

Single by Shizuka Kudo
- Released: November 5, 2008
- Genre: Pop
- Length: 5:33
- Label: Pony Canyon
- Songwriter: Miyuki Nakajima
- Producers: Miyuki Nakajima; Ichizō Seo

Shizuka Kudo singles chronology
"Amayo no Tsuki ni" (2007)	"Yukigasa" / "Night Wing" (2008)	"Kimi ga Kureta Mono" (2012)

Audio sample
- "Yukigasa": file; help

"Yukigasa" (雪傘(ゆきがさ); lit. "Snow Umbrella") is a song recorded by Japanese singer Shizuka Kudo. It was released as a double A-side single alongside "Night Wing" by Pony Canyon on November 5, 2008.

== Background and composition ==
"Yukigasa" is Kudo's first single to be released as a double A-side, with "Night Wing". The 1998 B-side "In the Sky", from the single "Kirara", was treated as an A-side, but never officially released as such. "Yukigasa", as well as "Night Wing", was written and composed by Miyuki Nakajima, and arranged by Ichizō Seo. The single marks Kudo's first collaboration with Nakajima in two years, since "Clāvis (Kagi)". It is described as a "feminine" ballad. Lyrically, the song tells a winter love story of a woman finally finding someone to spend her birthday with. The song is composed in the key of C minor and Kudo's vocals span from G_{3} to B♭_{4} in modal voice, and up to C_{5} in head voice.

== Chart performance ==
"Yukigasa" debuted at number 75 on the Oricon Singles Chart, with 1,000 copies sold. The single charted for two weeks and sold a total of 2,000 copies. It also charted on Billboard Japan's Top Single Sales chart, on which it peaked at number 88.

== Cover version ==
In 2010, Nakajima recorded a cover of "Yukigasa" as a bonus track for her album, Mayonaka no Dōbutsuen.

== Track listing ==
All tracks are written by Miyuki Nakajima.

No.	Title	Arranger(s)	Length
1.	"Night Wing"	Ichizō Seo	4:35
2.	"Yukigasa" (雪傘, "Snow Umbrella")	Seo	5:33
3.	"Night Wing" (Less Vocal)	Seo	4:35
4.	"Yukigasa" (Less Vocal)	Seo	5:32
Total length:			20:17

== Charts ==
Chart (2008)	Peak position
Japan Weekly Singles (Oricon)	75
Japan Top Singles Sales (Billboard)	88
