= Moon Water =

Moon Water may refer to:

- Lunar water, water that is present on the Moon
- Moon Water (song), a 1995 song by Shizuka Kudo
- Moon Water (dance), a dance performed by Cloud Gate Dance Theater Theater in Taiwan
- Moon Water (musician), an alias of Irish musician Liam McCay/Sign Crushes Motorist
