= Night Wing =

Single by Shizuka Kudo
- Released: November 5, 2008
- Genre: Pop
- Length: 4:35
- Label: Pony Canyon
- Songwriter(s): Miyuki Nakajima
- Producer(s): Miyuki Nakajima; Ichizō Seo

Shizuka Kudo singles chronology
"Amayo no Tsuki ni" (2007)	"Night Wing" / "Yukigasa" (2008)	"Kimi ga Kureta Mono" (2012)

Audio sample
- "Night Wing": file; help

"Night Wing" (stylized as "NIGHT WING") is a song recorded by Japanese singer Shizuka Kudo. It was released as a double A-side single alongside "Yukigasa" by Pony Canyon on November 5, 2008. It served as the ending theme to the AX music show Ongaku Senshi Music Fighter.

== Background and composition ==
"Night Wing" is Kudo's first single to be released as a double A-side, with "Yukigasa". Her 1998 single, "Kirara", and its coupling song, "In the Sky", received a similar treatment, but was never officially released as such. "Night Wing" was written and composed by Miyuki Nakajima, and arranged by Ichizō Seo. The song marks Kudo's first collaboration with Nakajima in two years, since "Clāvis (Kagi)". It is described as a powerful midtempo song written by an invigorated Nakajima. Lyrically, the song describes a protagonist metaphorically "spreading her heart-shaped wings and soaring through a windy sky" and ambiguously pondering about her contradictory actions and mixed feelings. The song is composed in the key of A-sharp minor and Kudo's vocals span from G♯_{3} to A_{4}.

== Cover version ==
Nakajima performed a cover of "Night Wing" in concert during her Enkai 2012-3 tour. In 2014, a live recording of one of her performances of the song was included on the live album, Miyuki Nakajima "Enkai" 2012-3: Live Selection.

== Chart performance ==
"Night Wing" debuted at number 75 on the Oricon Singles Chart, with 1,000 copies sold. The single charted for two weeks and sold a total of 2,000 copies. It also charted on Billboard Japan's Top Single Sales chart, on which it peaked at number 88.

== Track listing ==
All tracks are written by Miyuki Nakajima

No.	Title	Arranger(s)	Length
1.	"Night Wing"	Ichizō Seo	4:35
2.	"Yukigasa"	Seo	5:33
3.	"Night Wing" (Less Vocal)	Seo	4:35
4.	"Yukigasa" (Less Vocal)	Seo	5:32
Total length:			20:17

== Charts ==
Chart (2008)	Peak position
Japan Weekly Singles (Oricon)	75
Japan Top Singles Sales (Billboard)	88
