= My Precious: Shizuka Sings Songs of Miyuki =

Studio album by Shizuka Kudo
- Released: August 20, 2008
- Genre: Pop
- Length: 66:05
- Label: Pony Canyon

Shizuka Kudo chronology
20th Anniversary B-side collection (2008)	My Precious: Shizuka Sings Songs of Miyuki (2008)	My Treasure Best: Miyuki Nakajima × Tsugutoshi Gotō Collection (2015)

My Precious: Shizuka Sings Songs of Miyuki (stylized as "MY PRECIOUS -Shizuka sings songs of Miyuki-") is the second cover album by Japanese singer Shizuka Kudo. It was released on August 20, 2008, through Pony Canyon. The album features eleven covers of songs originally penned and performed by Miyuki Nakajima, chosen by Kudo from Nakajima's exhaustive catalog. The record also includes, as bonus tracks, three songs of Kudo's that were written and composed by Nakajima: "Gekijō" (1996), "Setsu Getsu Ka" (1998) and "Clāvis (Kagi)" (2006).

== Background ==
Kudo came up with the idea for the album when she attended one of Nakajima's concerts during the Miyuki Nakajima Concert Tour 2007 tour in November 2007, and recognized the timeless nature of Nakajima's music. Her rediscovered appreciation for Nakajima's songs is what prompted Kudo to propose and pursue the idea of recording an entire album of Miyuki Nakajima covers.

For the album, Kudo picked songs of Nakajima's that were dear to her and that she wanted to sing herself. She recorded thirty covers, of which only eleven made the final cut of the album. The album contains three original songs of Kudo's written by Nakajima as bonus tracks. "I wanted to take Nakajima's powerful songs and put a lighter spin on them and create my own renditions," Kudo tells Oricon in an interview. She explained further: "You don't sing Miyuki [Nakajima]'s songs from your diaphragm, you have to sing from your guts". She joked that her idea of bringing a lighter touch to the songs went up in flames because of that dimension of Nakajima's music requires your full concentration. Kudo singled out "Inochi no Betsumei" as the most emotionally demanding song to record, bringing her almost to tears in the studio.

== Critical reception ==
Kudo was praised for bringing her "A-game" as a vocalist to the task of performing Nakajima's songs. The songs' arrangement and production were also acclaimed for being "solid and unpretentious". The bonus tracks were cited as a good show of Kudo's evolution as a vocalist.

== Commercial performance ==
My Precious: Shizuka Sings Songs of Miyuki debuted at number 20 on the Oricon Albums Chart, with 6,000 units sold. The album charted in the top 300 for a total of five weeks, selling a reported 13,000 copies during its chart run.

== Track listing ==
All tracks are written by Miyuki Nakajima.

No.	Title	Arranger(s)	Length
1.	"Sora to Kimi no Aida ni" (空と君のあいだに, "Between the Sky and You")	Taisuke Sawachika	4:56
2.	"Gin no Ryū no Se ni Notte" (銀の龍の背に乗って, "Riding on the Silver Dragon's Back")	Jun Ichikawa	5:45
3.	"Mikaeri Bijin" (見返り美人, "Head-Turner")	Sawachika	4:32
4.	"Yamaneko" (やまねこ, "Wildcat")	Akihisa Matsūra	3:56
5.	"Namida (Made in Tears)" (涙 -Made in tears-, "Tears")	Yasuaki Maejima	4:59
6.	"Camouflage" (カム・フラージュ, Kamu Furāju)	Ichikawa	3:38
7.	"Asai Nemuri" (浅い眠り, "Light Sleep")	Ichikawa	5:13
8.	"Doyōnami" (土用波, "High Summer Waves")	Masayuki Sakamoto	4:45
9.	"Inochi no Betsumei" (命の別名, "Another Name for Life")	Sawachika	4:31
10.	"Sorafune"	Matsūra	3:45
11.	"Suzume" (すずめ, "Sparrow")	Sawachika	4:45
12.	"Gekijō"	Ichizō Seo	4:38
13.	"Setsu Getsu Ka"	Seo	4:45
14.	"Clāvis (Kagi)"	Seo	5:57
Total length:			66:05

== Charts ==
Chart (2008)	Peak position
Japan Weekly Albums (Oricon)	20
Japan Top Albums Sales (Billboard)	24
