= Jewelry Box =

Jewelry Box may refer to:

- Jewelry Box (Shizuka Kudo album), 2002
- Jewelry Box (T-ara album), 2012

== See also ==
- Casket (decorative box)
