= Blue Zone (song) =

Single by Shizuka Kudo

from the album Full of Love
- Released: April 7, 1999
- Genre: Pop
- Length: 4:16
- Label: Pony Canyon
- Songwriter(s): Aeri; Takashi Tsushimi
- Producer(s): Shizuka Kudo; Taisuke Sawachika

Shizuka Kudo singles chronology
"Akashiya Sanma-san ni Kiite Minai to ne" (1998)	"Blue Zone" (1999)	"Shinku no Hana" (2000)

Audio sample
- file; help

"Blue Zone" is a song recorded by Japanese singer Shizuka Kudo for her fourteenth studio album, Full of Love. It was released through Pony Canyon as the album's lead single on April 7, 1999. The song featured on TV commercials for Toyo tires. A song titled "I.n.g" was originally slated to be released in place of "Blue Zone". Since it does not appear on Full of Love, it is unclear whether the song was scrapped or if "I.n.g" was simply an alternate title. "Blue Zone" is the third and last in a trilogy of singles with "Blue" in the title: "Blue Zone" is preceded by "Blue Velvet" and "Blue Rose", respectively.

As well as being the last single released in Mini CD single format, "Blue Zone" was the last single Kudo released with Pony Canyon, until signing anew with the label in 2005 and releasing "Lotus (Umareshi Hana)".

== Background ==
The song was written by Shizuka Kudo, under the pseudonym Aeri, and composed by Takashi Tsushimi. It is the first single with lyrics by Kudo since "Kama Sutra no Densetsu". The song is composed in the key of G major and Kudo's vocals span from A_{3} to B_{4}. Lyrically, the song deals with the initiation of an inexperienced lover.

== Cover version ==
Kumi Koda performed "Blue Zone" when auditioning for the second generation of Morning Musume., broadcast on the TX talent search show Asayan.

== Chart performance ==
The single debuted at number 28 on the Oricon Singles Chart, selling 9,000 copies in its first week. It fell to number 45 the following week, with sales of 4,000 copies. "Blue Zone" charted in the top 100 for four weeks, selling a total of 20,000 copies.

== Track listing ==
All lyrics are written by Aeri

No.	Title	Music	Arranger(s)	Length
1.	"Blue Zone"	Takashi Tsushimi	Taisuke Sawachika	4:16
2.	"Ziguzagu"	Akira Ikuma	Ikuma	4:59
3.	"Blue Zone" (Original Karaoke)	Tsushimi	Sawachika	4:16
Total length:				13:31

== Charts ==
Chart (1999)	Peak position	Sales
Japan Weekly Singles (Oricon)	28	20,000
