= My Precious (disambiguation) =

My precious is a phrase often spoken by the character Gollum in The Lord of the Rings novel and media franchise.

My Precious may also refer to:

- My Precious (film), a 2023 Thai film and 2024 television series
- My Precious: Shizuka Sings Songs of Miyuki, a 2008 cover album by Japanese singer Shizuka Kudo
