= Ice Rain =

Ice Rain may refer to:

- "Ice Rain" (song), 1994
- Ice Rain (film), 2004

== See also ==
- Freezing rain
- Rain and snow mixed
- Ice pellets
- Graupel
- Hail
