= Ten-Sei =

Tensei

Studio album by Miyuki Nakajima
- Released: November 16, 2005
- Recorded: Cello Studios, O'Henry Sound Studios, and Epicurus
- Genre: Folk rock
- Length: 59:00
- Label: Yamaha Music Communications
- Producer: Ichizo Seo, Miyuki Nakajima

Miyuki Nakajima chronology
Ima no Kimochi (2004)	Tensei (2005)	Lullaby Singer (2006)

Ten-Sei (転生) is the 33rd studio album by Japanese singer-songwriter Miyuki Nakajima, released in November 2005.

Like some previous albums 10 Wings, Hi -Wings- and Tsuki -Wings-, Tensei is composed of the songs Nakajima wrote for her experimental musical Yakai. All the materials appeared on the album were originally performed on Yakai Vol. 14: "24-Ji Chaku 0-Ji Hatsu" which was taken place at the Bunkamura Theatre Cocoon during January 2004. Except "The Mirage Hotel" which was already included on her 2003 Love Letter (Koibumi) album (Ten-Sei features newly arranged version of a song), most of the songs appeared on the studio album for the first time.

From the album, "For Those Who Can't Go Home" was later released as a single (flip side was live recording version of "Relay of the Soul" which was taken from Yakai). It was featured as a theme song for the television drama Kemonomichi (adaptation of the novel written by Seicho Matsumoto) starring Ryoko Yonekura and aired on TV Asahi in 2006. "Relay of the Soul" was also used in the drama series called On'na no Ichidaiki aired on Fuji TV during autumn 2005.

== Track listing ==
All songs written and composed by Miyuki Nakajima, arranged by Ichizo Seo

1. "Lost and Found (遺失物預り所, Ishitsubutsu Azukarijo)" – 4:58
2. "For Those Who Can't Go Home (帰れない者たちへ, Kaerenai Monotachi e)" – 5:19
3. "The Scenery Off the Beaten Path (線路の外の風景, Senro no Soto no Fūkei)" – 4:22
4. "The Twisting Möbius Band (メビウスの輪はねじれる, Mebiusu no Wa wa Nejireru)" – 5:10
5. "Fortune Cookies (フォーチュン・クッキー, Fōchun Kukkī)" – 4:06
6. "Shady Midnight Table (闇夜のテーブル, Yamiyo no Tēburu)" – 5:49
7. "My Homeland is Beyond the Wind (我が祖国は風の彼方, Waga Sokoku wa Kaze no Kanata)" – 5:52
8. "Relay of the Soul (命のリレー, Inochi no Rirē)" – 5:34
9. "The Mirage Hotel (ミラージュ・ホテル, Mirāju Hoteru)" – 6:04
10. "Salmon Dance (サーモン・ダンス, Sāmon Dansu)" – 5:21
11. "Infinite Orbit (無限・軌道, Mugen Kidou)" – 6:25

== Personnel ==
- Michael Thompson – Electric guitar, acoustic guitar
- Nozomi Furukawa – Electric guitar, bouzouki
- Shūji Nakamura – Acoustic guitar
- Neil Stubenhaus – Electric bass
- Satoshi Nakamura – Soprano sax, alto sax
- Vinnie Colaiuta – Drums
- Gregg Bissonette – Drums
- Matarou Misawa – Cymbals, timpani
- DJ Masterkey – Scratch
- Jon Gilutin – Keyboards, acoustic piano, hammond organ, strings pad
- Ichizo Seo – Computer programming, keyboards
- Shingo Kobayashi – Computer programming, keyboards
- Tomō Satō – Computer programming
- Yousuke Sugimoto – Computer programming
- Ittetsu Gen – Violin
- Crusher Kimura – Violin
- Sid Page – Violin (Concertmaster)
- Susan Chatman – Violin
- Mario De Leon – Violin
- Kirstin File – Violin
- Berj Garabedian – Violin
- Peter Kent – Violin
- Natalie Leggett – Violin
- Robert Matsuda – Violin
- Alyssa Park – Violin
- Cameron Patrick – Violin
- Robert Peterson – Violin
- John Wittenberg – Violin
- Takuya Mori – Viola
- Denyse Buffum – Viola
- Cheryl Kohfeld – Viola
- Carole Mukogawa – Viola
- David Stenske – Viola
- Masami Horisawa – Cello
- Tomoki Iwanaga – Cello
- Larry Corbett – Cello
- Maurice Grants – Cello
- Dan Smith – Cello
- Rudy Stein – Cello
- Suzie Katayama – Strings conducting and contracting
- Kazuyo Sugimoto – Harmony vocals
- Fumikazu Miyashita – Harmony vocals
- Julia Waters – Backing vocals
- Oren Waters – Backing vocals
- Maxine Waters – Backing vocals
- Tery Wood – Backing vocals
- Angie Jaree – Backing vocals
- Wendy Fraser – Backing vocals
- Carmen Carter – Backing vocals
- Jim Glistrap – Backing vocals
- Carmen Twillie – Backing vocals
- Jess Wilard III – Backing vocals

== Chart positions ==
=== Album ===
Year	Album	Chart	Position	Weeks	Sales
2005	Ten-Sei	Japanese Oricon Weekly Albums Chart (Top 300)	12	15	65,000+

=== Single ===
Year	Single	B-Side	Chart	Position	Weeks	Sales
2006	"For Those Who Can't Go Home"	"Relay of the Soul" ['04 "Yakai" Version]	Japanese Oricon Weekly (top 200)	35	7	13,000

== Release history ==
Country	Date	Label	Format	Catalog number
Japan	November 16, 2005	Yamaha Music Communications	CD	YCCW-10017
Japan	December 3, 2008	Yamaha Music Communications	CD	YCCW-10085
