= Shinku no Hana =

Single by Shizuka Kudo

from the album Jewelry Box
- Released: November 8, 2000
- Genre: Pop
- Length: 4:40
- Label: Extasy Japan
- Songwriter(s): Tomomi Tachibana; Yoshiki
- Producer(s): Yoshiki

Shizuka Kudo singles chronology
"Blue Zone" (1999)	"Shinku no Hana" (2000)	"Maple" (2002)

Audio sample
- "Shinku no Hana": file; help

"Shinku no Hana" (深紅(しんく)の花(はな), lit. "Deep Crimson Flower") is a song recorded by Japanese singer Shizuka Kudo for her fifteenth studio album, Jewelry Box. It was released as the album's leading single by Extasy Japan on November 8, 2000. It served as the theme song to the tanpatsu dramas aired between October 2000 and 2001 on AX's Kayō Suspense Gekijō time slot. "Shinku no Hana" is Kudo's first single to be released in 12 cm CD single format since "Again".

== Background and composition ==
"Shinku no Hana" is Kudo's first single released through the label Extasy Japan. As per an initial press release, a cover of a Janet Jackson song was planned to be included on the CD single, but was eventually omitted. Originally titled "Shinku no Bara" (深紅の薔薇, lit. "Deep Crimson Rose"), the title song "Shinku no Hana" was written and produced by X Japan member and Extasy Records founder Yoshiki. He is credited under the female pseudonym of Tomomi Tachibana (橘朋実) for the song's lyrics. The song is composed in the key of F minor and Kudo's vocals span from B♭_{3} to C_{5} in modal voice, and to C♯_{5} in head voice. Lyrically, the song deals with the theme of heartbreak. Yoshiki describes a protagonist dejected in love who compares love to a deep crimson-colored flower that eventually wilts and fades away because "nothing lasts forever".

== Chart performance ==
The single debuted at number 33 on the Oricon Singles Chart, selling 10,000 copies in its first week. It fell to number 40 the following week, with sales of 6,000 copies. "Shinku no Hana" charted in the top 100 for four weeks, selling a total of 22,000 copies.

== Track listing ==
No.	Title	Writer(s)	Arranger(s)	Length
1.	"Shinku no Hana" (深紅の花, "Deep Crimson Flower")	Tomomi Tachibana; Yoshiki	Yoshiki	4:40
2.	"Ashimoto o Kazaru Taiyō" (足下を飾る太陽, "The Sun Gracing My Feet")	Aeri; Kazunori Fujimoto	Taisuke Sawachika	4:35
3.	"Pray"	Aeri; Naoshi Tsuda	Shinobu Narita	3:52
Total length:				13:07

== Charts ==
Chart (2000)	Peak position	Sales
Japan Weekly Singles (Oricon)	33	22,000
