= Yū (song) =

Single by Shizuka Kudo
- Released: June 5, 1996
- Genre: Pop
- Length: 4:54
- Label: Pony Canyon
- Songwriters: Aeri; Hideya Nagazaki
- Producers: Shizuka Kudo; Hideya Nagazaki

Shizuka Kudo singles chronology
"Chō" (1996)	"Yū" (1996)	"Gekijō" (1996)

Audio sample
- "Yū": file; help

"Yū" (優(ゆう); lit. "Gentle") is a song recorded by Japanese singer Shizuka Kudo, released as a single through Pony Canyon on June 5, 1996. It featured as the theme song on the ninth and penultimate installment of the Gokudō no Onna-tachi Yakuza film series, Gokudō no Onna-tachi: Kiken na Kake (1996), starring Kudo herself.

The coupling song "Luna (Tsuki no Megami)", which was first included on Kudo's album, Doing, a month prior, is the theme song to the film Bakusō! Moon Angel: Kita e (1996), starring Kudo as a female truck driver in her first cinematic role since Future Memories: Last Christmas. The song was recut as a B-side to "Yū" to promote the film.

"Yū" is the third and last in a consecutive trilogy of singles with one-character titles: "Yū" is preceded by "Chō" and "7".

== Background ==
"Yū" is a ballad co-written by Kudo, under the pseudonym Aeri, and Hideya Nagazaki. It is written in the key of C-sharp minor and set to a tempo of 70 beats per minute. Kudo's vocals span one octave, from B_{3} to B_{4}. The song represents Kudo's heartfelt ode to her mother. Lyrically, it describes the strength of a mother and the greatness she brings to the narrator's life.

== Critical reception ==
Kudo sings about needing her love and wanting to learn the workings of her mother's heart. Kudo was praised for her emotional vocal performance. TV personality Ayako Nishikawa has listed the song as one of her personal favorites.

== Chart performance ==
The single debuted at number 26 on the Oricon Singles Chart with 20,000 copies sold in its first week, becoming Kudo's first single to peak outside of the top 20. It stayed in the top 100 for a total of seven weeks.

== Track listing ==
All lyrics are written by Aeri.

No.	Title	Music	Arranger(s)	Length
1.	"Yū" (優, "Gentle")	Hideya Nagazaki	Nagazaki	4:54
2.	"Luna (Tsuki no Megami)" (ルナ -月の女神-, Runa, "Luna (Moon Goddess)")	Kisaburō Suzuki	Taisuke Sawachika	4:48
3.	"Yū" (Original Karaoke)	Nagazaki	Nagazaki	4:54
Total length:				14:36

== Charts ==
Chart (1996)	Peak position	Sales
Japan Weekly Singles (Oricon)	26	73,000
