= Shōwa no Kaidan Vol. 1 =

Studio album by Shizuka Kudo
- Released: October 30, 2002
- Genre: Pop
- Length: 50:32
- Label: Extasy Japan
- Producer: Shizuka Kudo

Shizuka Kudo chronology
Jewelry Box (2002)	Shōwa no Kaidan Vol. 1 (2002)	Tsukikage (2005)

Shōwa no Kaidan Vol. 1 (昭和(しょうわ)の階段(かいだん) Vol.1, lit. "Shōwa's Stairway Vol. 1") is the first cover album by Japanese singer Shizuka Kudo. It was released on October 30, 2002, through Extasy Japan, marking her last release with the label. As the title evokes, the album features a selection of songs from the Shōwa period. It includes covers of artists such as Hiroko Yakushimaru, Mayumi Itsuwa, Kenji Sawada, Naoko Ken and Yōsui Inoue, among others. Kudo also recorded Japanese covers of "Moliendo Café", first recorded by Mario Suárez, and "Tennessee Waltz", originally recorded by Patti Page. The songs were originally covered in Japan by Sachiko Nishida and Chiemi Eri, respectively.

== Critical reception ==
Kudo was praised for modernizing popular songs from the Shōwa period and for her more personal song choice.

== Commercial performance ==
Shōwa no Kaidan Vol. 1 debuted at number 66 on the Oricon Albums Chart. It charted in the top 100 for a sole week, selling a total of 5,000 copies.

== Track listing ==
No.	Title	Writer(s)	Original artist	Length
1.	"Genki o Dashite"	Mariya Takeuchi	Hiroko Yakushimaru	4:17
2.	"Koibito yo" (恋人よ, "Dear Lover")	Mayumi Itsuwa	Mayumi Itsuwa	4:16
3.	"Casablanca Dandy" (カサブランカ・ダンディ, Kasaburanka Dandi)	Yū Aku; Katsuo Ōno	Kenji Sawada	4:06
4.	"Kamome wa Kamome" (かもめはかもめ, "Seagulls Are Seagulls")	Miyuki Nakajima	Naoko Ken	4:51
5.	"Kōri no Sekai" (氷の世界, "World of Ice")	Yōsui Inoue	Yōsui Inoue	3:40
6.	"Kuro no Funauta" (黒の舟唄, "Black Boat Song")	Kirihito Nō; Jun Sakurai	Akiyuki Nosaka	4:35
7.	"Nantonaku Nantonaku" (なんとなくなんとなく, "Somehow, Somehow")	Hiroshi Kamayatsu	Jun Inoue	2:09
8.	"Coffee Rumba" (コーヒー・ルンバ, Kōhī Runba)	José Manzo Perroni; Seiji Nakazawa	Sachiko Nishida	4:03
9.	"Acacia no Ame ga Yamu Toki" (アカシアの雨がやむとき, When the Acacia Rain Stops Falling)	Kaoru Mizuki; Hideyuki Fujiwara	Nishida	4:05
10.	"Kasbah no Onna" (カスバの女, "Kasbah Woman")	Hisao Ōtaka; Akira Kugayama	Eto Kunieda	3:17
11.	"Kuroyuri no Uta" (黒百合の歌, "Black Lily Song")	Kazuo Kikuta; Yūji Koseki	Shigeko Orī	3:45
12.	"Tennessee Waltz"	Redd Stewart; Pee Wee King; Toshizō Wada	Chiemi Eri	2:50
13.	"Hoshi no Nagare ni" (星の流れに, "In the Flow of Stars")	Minoru Shimizu; Ichirō Tone	Akiko Kikuchi	4:38
Total length:				50:32

== Charts ==
Chart (2002)	Peak position
Japan Weekly Albums (Oricon)	66
