= Kimi ga Kureta Mono =

Single by Shizuka Kudo
- Released: October 17, 2012
- Genre: Pop
- Length: 5:55
- Label: Pony Canyon
- Songwriter: Ayaka
- Producer: Akihisa Matsūra

Shizuka Kudo singles chronology
"Night Wing" / "Yukigasa" (2008)	"Kimi ga Kureta Mono" (2012)

Audio sample
- "Kimi ga Kureta Mono": file; help

"Kimi ga Kureta Mono" (キミがくれたもの; lit. "What You've Given Me") is a song recorded by Japanese singer Shizuka Kudo. It was released as a single by Pony Canyon on October 17, 2012. It was featured as the thirteenth ending theme on the TX anime series Fairy Tail, from episode 151 through 166. The song marks Kudo's first TV anime tie-in in fifteen years, since the Dragon Ball GT ending theme "Blue Velvet".

== Background ==
"Kimi ga Kureta mono" is Kudo's first single in four years. It was written and composed by Ayaka. The song, for which Ayaka also recorded backing vocals, was arranged and produced by Akihisa Matsūra, a regular collaborator of both Kudo and Ayaka. "Kimi ga Kureta Mono" marks Kudo's first time collaborating with Ayaka, as well as being the singer-songwriter's first time writing a song for another artist. Ayaka revealed in a press release that she was nervous at first, but when she heard Kudo's final cut of the song, she was moved by the way it all came together. Kudo was glad to have worked with Ayaka on this single, which was released in celebration of her 25th anniversary, and expressed really liking the song Ayaka wrote.

== Composition ==
The song is composed in the key of E-flat major, and Kudo's vocals span from B♭_{3} to C_{5}. Lyrically, the song is about the importance of living authentically. Ayaka writes from the perspective of a protagonist being moved by the realization of all the things she gains from putting an honest foot forward in life.

== Critical reception ==
The midtempo ballad is described as the perfect showcase for Kudo's voice. Ayaka was praised for crafting a dynamic melody with a subtle, but emotional, message. Kudo received acclaim for her "maternal and pointed" vocal performance, which was noted to be a perfect match with the theme of the song.

== Chart performance ==
"Kimi ga Kureta Mono" debuted at number 50 on both the Oricon Singles Chart and the Billboard Japan Hot Singles Sales chart. It charted on the Oricon Singles Chart for three weeks and Oricon reports total sales of 2,000 copies.

== Track listing ==
No.	Title	Writer(s)	Arranger(s)	Length
1.	"Kimi ga Kureta Mono" (キミがくれたもの, "What You've Given Me")	Ayaka	Akihisa Matsūra	5:55
2.	"Glass no Hana" (ガラスの花, Garasu no Hana, "Glass Flower")	Aeri; Gen Ittetsu	Ittetsu	5:03
3.	"Baroque Pearl" (バロックパール, Barokku Pāru)	Gorō Matsui; Reo	Reo	3:42
4.	"Kimi ga Kureta Mono" (Karaoke)	Ayaka	Matsūra	5:55
5.	"Glass no Hana" (Karaoke)	Ittetsu	Ittetsu	5:03
6.	"Baroque Pearl" (Karaoke)	Reo	Reo	3:41
Total length:				29:23

== Charts ==
Chart (2012)	Peak position
Japan Weekly Singles (Oricon)	50
Japan Hot Singles Sales (Billboard)	50
