= Akashiya Sanma-san ni Kiite Minai to ne =

Single by Sanma Akashiya and George Tokoro featuring Shizuka Kudo
- Released: March 17, 1999
- Genre: Comedy
- Length: 5:12
- Label: Pony Canyon
- Songwriter(s): George Tokoro
- Producer(s): George Tokoro; Neko Saito

Sanma Akashiya singles chronology
"Kawa no Nagare ni" (1989)	"Akashiya Sanma-san ni Kīte Minai to ne" (1999)

George Tokoro singles chronology
"Tonkachi" (1998)	"Akashiya Sanma-san ni Kīte Minai to ne" (1999)	"Nōka no Uta" (1999)

Shizuka Kudo singles chronology
"Isshun" (1998)	"Akashiya Sanma-san ni Kīte Minai to ne" (1999)	"Blue Zone" (1999)

"Akashiya Sanma-san ni Kiite Minai to ne" (明石家(あかしや)さんまさんに聞(き)いてみないとネ; lit. "Gotta Ask Sanma Akashiya") is a song recorded by Japanese comedians Sanma Akashiya and George Tokoro, and Japanese singer Shizuka Kudo. It was released as a single by Pony Canyon on March 17, 1999. The song was used as the theme song to Akashiya's KTV/CX variety show Sanma no Manma.

== Background ==
The idea for the song came about when Tokoro, who wrote the song, appeared as a guest on Akashiya's regular variety show Sanma no Manma. The two thought it would be comical to write a semi-serious song in order to vie for a spot on the prestigious Kōhaku Uta Gassen. They set the ridiculous goal of selling 50 million copies of the single and publicly proclaimed Glay to be their rival act. Kudo's involvement in the project was accidental: she happened to be near the studio Akashiya and Tokoro were recording at and when she crossed paths with the two, they asked her to join in on the track. Kudo provided backing vocals as well as singing a verse by herself.

== Chart performance ==
The single debuted at number 30 on the Oricon Singles Chart, selling 13,000 copies in its first week. It charted for five weeks in the top 100 and sold a total of 30,000 copies during its run.

== Track listing ==
All tracks are written by George Tokoro.

No.	Title	Arranger(s)	Length
1.	"Akashiya Sanma-san ni Kiite Minai to ne" (明石家さんまさんに聞いてみないとネ, "Gotta Ask Sanma Akashiya")	Neko Saito	5:12
2.	"Sōgō Nyūjō Kōshinkyoku" (総合入場行進曲, "Comprehensive Entrance March")	Saito	4:39
3.	"Akashiya Sanma-san ni Kiite Minai to ne" (Karaoke)	Saito	5:12
4.	"Sōgō Nyūjō Kōshinkyoku" (Karaoke)	Saito	4:33
Total length:			19:36

== Charts ==
Chart (1999)	Peak position	Sales
Japan Weekly Singles (Oricon)	30	30,000
