= Maple (song) =

Single by Shizuka Kudo

from the album Jewelry Box
- Released: April 24, 2002
- Genre: Pop
- Length: 5:29
- Label: Extasy Japan
- Songwriters: Aeri; Satoru Sugawara
- Producers: Satoru Sugawara; Shizuka Kudo

Shizuka Kudo singles chronology
"Shinku no Hana" (2000)	"Maple" (2002)	"Lotus (Umareshi Hana)" (2005)

Audio sample
- "Maple": file; help

"Maple" is a song recorded by Japanese singer Shizuka Kudo for her fifteenth studio album, Jewelry Box. It was released through Extasy Japan as the album's second and final single on April 24, 2002. The song was featured on the EX television series Kowloon de Aimashō, on which Kudo guest starred. "Maple" is Kudo's last single released under the label Extasy Japan.

== Background and composition ==
"Maple" marks the first single release by Kudo since the birth of her first daughter and marriage to Takuya Kimura. It was released one day shy of a year after the scheduled release of the song "Us", also included on Jewelry Box, was canceled. The song was written by Kudo, under the pseudonym Aeri, and Satoru Sugawara, who also arranged the song. It is composed in the key of B major and set to a tempo of 70 beats per minute. "Maple" is described as a melancholy-tinged ambient pop song. Lyrically, the song explores the theme of welcoming a new life, an experience which the narrator compares to a "rainbow-colored flower fluttering through the sky and landing in the palm of my hand".

== Chart performance ==
"Maple" debuted at number 35 on the Oricon Singles Chart, selling 6,000 copies in its first week. It fell to number 59 the following week, with sales of 3,000 copies. The single charted for a third and last week in the top 100, ranking at number 69 and logging under 3,000 copies sold, bringing its total sales to a little over 11,000 copies.

== Track listing ==
No.	Title	Writer(s)	Arranger(s)	Length
1.	"Maple"	Aeri; Satoru Sugawara	Sugawara	5:29
2.	"Hōsekibako" (宝石箱, "Jewelry Box")	Toko Furuuchi	Hideyuki Komatsu	5:48
3.	"Maple" (Instrumental)	Sugawara	Sugawara	5:29
4.	"Hōsekibako" (Instrumental)	Furuuchi	Komatsu	5:48
Total length:				22:34

== Charts ==
Chart (2002)	Peak position	Sales
Japan Weekly Singles (Oricon)	35	11,000
