= Lullaby for the Soul =

Studio album by Miyuki Nakajima
- Released: October 18, 2001
- Recorded: Cello Studios, O'Henry Sound Studios, and Epicurus
- Genre: Folk rock
- Length: 57:20
- Language: Japanese
- Label: Yamaha Music Communications
- Producer: Ichizō Seo, Miyuki Nakajima

Miyuki Nakajima chronology
Short Stories (Tanpenshū) (2000)	Lullaby for the Soul (2001)	Singles 2000 (2002)

Lullaby for the Soul (心守歌, Kokoromoriuta) is the 29th studio album by Japanese singer-songwriter Miyuki Nakajima, released in September 2001.

As a follow-up to a double A-Side single "Earthly Stars (Unsung Heroes)"/"Headlight, Taillight", Lullaby for the Soul was greeted with relatively high anticipation. It debuted at No. 3 on the Oricon chart in its first week (highest position since her 1996 compilation Daiginjyō which became her last No. 1 hit), although it quickly fell off the top 100 with physical sales of less than 100,000 copies in total. A music video of the opening track was produced to promote the album, and it was later issued on compilation DVD Utahime: Live in L.A. in 2004.

== Track listing ==
All songs written by Miyuki Nakajima, arranged by Ichizō Seo.

1. "Whispering Rain (囁く雨, Sasayaku Ame)" – 3:39
2. "Sharing a Table (相席, Aiseki)" – 5:33
3. "Even the Leaves the Tallest Tree Fall and Return to Its Root (樹高千丈 落葉帰根, Jukou Senjou Rakuyou Kikon)" – 6:22
4. "That Bus (あのバスに, Ano Basu ni)" – 4:30
5. "Lullaby for the Soul (心守歌, Kokoromoriuta)" – 5:19
6. "Snow Crystals (六花, Rokka)" – 5:23
7. "It's a Carnival (カーニヴァルだったね, Kānivaru Dattane)" – 4:33
8. "Tundra Bird (ツンドラ・バード, Tsundora Bādo)" – 4:48
9. "Nightwalk (夜行, Yakou)" – 6:26
10. "Greet the Moon (月迎え, Tsuki Mukae)" – 5:00
11. "Lovers Only" – 5:47

== Personnel ==
- Miyuki Nakajima – vocals
- Ichizō Seo – keyboards
- Vinnie Colaiuta – drums
- Russ Kunkel – drums
- Michael Thompson – electric guitar
- Masayoshi Furukawa – electric guitar
- Tomō Sato – acoustic guitar
- Tim Pierce – electric guitar, flat mandolin
- Neil Stubenhaus – electric bass
- Leland Sklar – electric bass
- Jon Gilutin – acoustic piano, electric piano, strings pad, hammond B-3
- Shingo Kobayashi – keyboards
- Elton Nagata – keyboards
- Joe Stone – oboe
- Steve Richards – cello
- Keishi Urata – computer programming
- Seiichi Takubo – computer programming
- Julia Waters – backing vocals
- Maxine Waters – backing vocals
- Oren Waters – backing vocals
- Naoki Takao – backing vocals
- Yasuhiro Kido – backing vocals
- Kiyoshi Hiyama – backing vocals
- Junko Hirotani – backing vocals
- Taeko Saitō – backing vocals
- Kayoko Wada – backing vocals

== Production ==
- Producer and Arranger: Ichizo Seo
- Composer, Writer, Producer and Performer: Miyuki Nakajima
- Engineer and Mixer: David Thoener, Joe Chiccarelli
- Assistant Engineer: Robert Road, Tim Lauber, Chiaki Kudō
- Mixer: Rob Jacobs
- A&R: Yoshio Kan
- Assistant: Tim Lauber, Errin Familia, Andy Ackland
- Assistant for Producer: Tomo Satō
- Promoter: Ryuta Yonezawa
- Artist Promotor: Mio Moriwaki
- Sales Promotor: Takehiko Kudō
- Production Coordinator: Ryō Yoneya
- Recording Coordinator: Takashi Kimura, Fumio Miyata, Tomoko Takaya, Ruriko Duer、Norio Yamamoto
- L.A. Studio Musicians Contractor: Suzie Katayama
- Photographer and Art Director: Jin Tamura
- Designer: Hirofumi Arai
- Costume: Takeshi Hazama
- Hair and Make-up: Noriko Izumisawa
- Artist Management: Kohji Suzuki, Kohichi Okazaki
- Assistant: Fumie Ohshima
- General Producer: Shosuke Hasegawa
- General Affairs: Atsuko Hayashi, Aya Ninomiya
- Special Thanks to Kiyoshi Yada, John Hisamoto Akira Hayashi

Mastered by Tom Baker at Precision Mastering, Los Angeles

== Chart positions ==
Chart	Position	Weeks	Sales
Japanese Oricon Weekly Albums Chart (top 100)	3	7	90,000+
