= Singles 2000 =

Compilation album by Miyuki Nakajima
- Released: April 17, 2002
- Recorded: 1983, 1994–2000
- Genre: J-Pop (Folk rock)
- Length: 74:11
- Label: Yamaha Music Communications
- Producer: Miyuki Nakajima, Ichizo Seo

Miyuki Nakajima chronology
Lullaby for the Soul (2001)	Singles 2000 (2002)	Otogibanashi: Fairy Ring (2002)

Singles 2000 is the compilation album by a Japanese singer-songwriter Miyuki Nakajima, released in April 2002.

The album comprises all A-sides and B-Sides of her seven singles which were released from 1994 to 2000. Like its two predecessors each were released in 1987 and 1994, the songs appeared on Singles 2000 are listed reverse-chronologically. It includes three massive hit singles each of which sold over a million copies; "Between the Sky and You" (double A-Side with "Fight"), "Wanderer's Song", and "Earthly Stars (Unsung Heroes)" (double A-Side with "Headlight, Taillight") which had enjoyed unprecedented success on the Japanese Oricon chart at the time and finally climbed the number-one spot in 2003.

Singles 2000 gained favorable commercial success, debuted at the number-three on the Oricon albums chart and entered there for over a year.

== Track listings ==
All songs written and composed by Miyuki Nakajima, arranged by Ichizo Seo (except "Fight!" was arranged by Takayuki Inoue)

Track No.	Title	Original release date
1.	"Earthly Stars (Unsung Heroes) (地上の星, Chijou no Hoshi)"	July 15, 2000
2.	"Headlight, Taillight (ヘッドライト・テールライト, Heddoraito Tēruraito)"	July 15, 2000
3.	"Not Even Blinking (瞬きもせず, Mabataki mo Sezu)"	October 4, 1998
4.	"In the Spring (私たちは春の中で, Watashitachi wa Haru no Naka de)"	October 4, 1998
5.	"Another Name for Life (命の別名, Inochi no Betsumei)" [Edit]	February 4, 1998
6.	"Tapestry (糸, Ito)"	February 4, 1998
7.	"An Affectionate Tale (愛情物語, Aijou Monogatari)"	November 7, 1997
8.	"Happiness (幸せ, Shiawase)"	November 7, 1997
9.	"It's Only Love (たかが愛, Takaga Ai)"	November 21, 1996
10.	"The First Thing I See (目を開けて最初に君を見たい, Me wo Akete Saisho ni Kimi wo Mitai)"	November 21, 1996
11.	"Wanderer's Song (旅人のうた, Tabibito no Uta)"	May 19, 1995
12.	"P-A-I-N-F-U-L (Se-Tsu-Na-Ku-Te)"	May 19, 1995
13.	"Between the Sky and You (空と君のあいだに, Sora to Kimi no Aida ni)"	May 14, 1994
14.	"Fight! (ファイト!, Faito!)" [Edit]	May 14, 1994

== Production ==
- Producer: Miyuki Nakajima, Ichizo Seo (except "Fight!")
- Mastering engineer: Tom Baker (at Precision Mastering, Los Angeles)
- Mastering Coordinator Ruriko Duer (Los Angeles)
- Photographer: Jin Tamura, Masahiko Yakou
- Cover Design: Hirofumi Arai
- DAD: Genichi Kawakami

== Chart position ==
Chart	Position	Weeks	Sales中島みゆき
Japanese Oricon Weekly Albums Chart (Top 300)	3	81	462,000+

Footnotes: In November 2002, the Japanese Oricon Weekly Albums was expanded from the Top-100 to the Top-300.

== Release history ==
Country	Date	Label	Format	Catalog number
Japan	April 17, 2002	Yamaha Music Communications	CD	YCCW-00037
