= Best of Ballade: Current =

Compilation album by Shizuka Kudo
- Released: November 18, 1998
- Recorded: 1987–98
- Genres: Pop; rock
- Length: 69:43
- Label: Pony Canyon

Shizuka Kudo chronology
I'm Not (1998)	Best of Ballade: Current (1998)	Full of Love (1999)

Best of Ballade: Current (Best of Ballade カレント, Best of Ballade Karento) is the eighth compilation album by Japanese singer Shizuka Kudo. It was released on November 18, 1998, through Pony Canyon. The compilation is Kudo's second ballad collection, following Best of Ballade: Empathy. The album features a selection of previously released ballads, handpicked by Kudo, as well as new recordings in English of three songs: "In the Sky", "Daite Kuretara Ii no ni" and "Ice Rain".

== Commercial performance ==
Best of Ballade: Current debuted at number nine on the Oricon Albums Chart, with 40,000 units sold. The album charted in the top 100 for five straight weeks, selling a reported total of 65,000 copies during its chart run.

== Track listing ==
No.	Title	Writer(s)	Arranger(s)	Length
1.	"In the Sky" (Text in English)	Naoki Takao; ЯK	Taisuke Sawachika	4:35
2.	"Wine Hitokuchi no Uso" (ワインひとくちの嘘, "Lying After One Sip of Wine")	Gorō Matsui; Tsugutoshi Gotō	Gotō	4:50
3.	"Yume" (夢, "Dream")	Aeri; Ryō Asuka	Sawachika	5:46
4.	"Mechakucha ni Naite Shimaitai"	Matsui; Gotō	Gotō; Satoshi Kadokura	4:59
5.	"Koi Hitoyo"	Matsui; Gotō	Gotō	4:31
6.	"Serenade" (セレナーデ, Serenāde)	Matsui; Gotō	Gotō	5:01
7.	"Let Me Sleep In Your Arms" (Text in English)	Rieko Terai; Matsui; Gotō	Gotō	5:14
8.	"Koi Moyō" (恋模様, "Sign of Love")	Aeri; Gotō	Draw4	4:47
9.	"Venus"	Aeri; Takashi Tsushimi	Sawachika	5:05
10.	"Setsu Getsu Ka"	Miyuki Nakajima	Ichizō Seo	4:47
11.	"Binetsu" (微熱, "Slight Fever")	Aeri; Hatake	Chokkaku	4:33
12.	"Door"	Aeri; Tsushimi	Sawachika	4:43
13.	"Ice Rain" (Text in English)	Terai; Aeri; Tsushimi	Kadokura	6:02
14.	"Kirara"	ЯK	Sawachika	4:50
Total length:				69:43

== Charts ==
Chart (1998)	Peak position	Sales
Japan Weekly Albums (Oricon)	9	65,000
