= Purple (Shizuka Kudo album) =

Studio album by Shizuka Kudo
- Released: August 2, 1995
- Genres: Pop; trip hop
- Length: 52:36
- Label: Pony Canyon
- Producer: Shizuka Kudo

Shizuka Kudo chronology
Expose (1994)	Purple (1995)	Doing (1996)

Singles from Purple
- 1. "Ice Rain" Released: November 18, 1994; 2. "Moon Water" Released: May 19, 1995

Purple is the tenth studio album by Japanese singer Shizuka Kudo. It was released on August 2, 1995, through Pony Canyon. The album is named after Kudo's favorite color, purple, or more specifically wisteria. The record features the song "Olivia", which Kudo wrote about her deceased brother.

== Critical reception ==
Kudo was praised for the "chic" and "mature" musical direction of the album. She was acclaimed for producing a cohesive sound, consisting of strings-intensive ballads and downtempo tracks.

== Commercial performance ==
Purple debuted at number seven on the Oricon Albums Chart, with 55,000 units sold in its first week, marking Kudo's last studio album to debut in the top ten. The album dropped two positions to number nine on its second week, with 31,000 copies sold. It charted one last time in the top twenty, ranking at number 16 on its third week with 18,000 copies sold. Purple spent seven consecutive weeks in the top 100, selling a reported total of 140,000 copies during its run.

== Track listing ==
All lyrics are written by Aeri.

No.	Title	Music	Arranger(s)	Length
1.	"Ice Rain"	Takashi Tsushimi	Satoshi Kadokura	6:00
2.	"Wing"	Toshiaki Matsumoto	Taisuke Sawachika	4:31
3.	"Deadline"	Tsushimi	Ichirō Hada	5:10
4.	"Tomorrow's River"	Matsumoto	Akihisa Matsūra	6:16
5.	"Olivia"	Matsumoto	Kadokura	5:29
6.	"Bloom"	Tsushimi	Yasushi Suehara	5:12
7.	"Moon Water"	Arata Tanimoto	Sawachika	5:10
8.	"Virgin Flight (1996)"	Tsushimi	Sawachika	5:01
9.	"Sagisō" (さぎ草, "Fringed Orchid")	Sawachika	Sawachika	4:44
10.	"Venus"	Tsushimi	Sawachika	5:03
Total length:				52:36

== Charts ==
Chart (1995)	Peak position	Sales
Japan Weekly Albums (Oricon)	7	140,000
