= I'm Not =

Studio album by Shizuka Kudo
- Released: April 29, 1998
- Genres: Pop; rock
- Length: 45:52
- Label: Pony Canyon
- Producer: Hatake

Shizuka Kudo chronology
Dress (1997)	I'm Not (1998)	Best of Ballade: Current (1998)

Singles from I'm Not
- 1. "Blue Velvet" Released: May 28, 1997; 2. "Kama Sutra no Densetsu" Released: November 19, 1997

I'm Not is the thirteenth studio album by Japanese singer Shizuka Kudo. It was released on April 29, 1998, through Pony Canyon. The album was entirely produced and composed by Sharam Q guitarist, Hatake, while Kudo wrote the lyrics for all ten songs, under the pseudonym Aeri. The album features prominent rock musicians such as Hideki Samejima of Hound Dog on bass, Munetaka Higuchi of Loudness on drums, and Vow Wow's Rei Atsumi on the keyboard.

== Critical reception ==
Kudo and Hatake were praised for crafting a "provocative" and "mature" pop-rock sound. Kudo was positively noted for bringing a "cool color" to the songs, well-matched to Hatake's strong signature sound. She received acclaim for her robust vocal performance throughout the record.

== Commercial performance ==
I'm Not debuted at number 19 on the Oricon Albums Chart, with 17,000 units sold in its first week. It charted in the top 100 for three weeks and sold a reported total of 29,000 copies during its chart run.

== Track listing ==
All lyrics written by Aeri; all tracks composed and arranged by Hatake, except "Doggie" by Hatake and Nobuyuki Mori.

No.	Title	Length
1.	"Delusion (Mōsō)" (delusion -妄想-)	3:39
2.	"Away"	4:55
3.	"Kama Sutra no Densetsu"	4:52
4.	"It's OK"	5:16
5.	"Pop Corn"	4:13
6.	"Who Knows"	5:17
7.	"Blue Velvet"	3:52
8.	"Doggie"	3:40
9.	"Nostalgia" (ノスタルジア, Nosutarujia)	4:39
10.	"Glacier (Hyōga)" (glacier -氷河-)	5:29
Total length:		45:52

== Charts ==
Chart (1998)	Peak position	Sales
Japan Weekly Albums (Oricon)	19	29,000
