= Moon Water (dance) =

Dance performed by Cloud Gate Dance Theater

"Moon Water" is a dance performed by Cloud Gate Dance Theater of Taiwan. Choreographed by Lin Hwai-min, it is the second piece of the “Spiritual Journey” series. This work is inspired by Buddha’s teaching: emptiness like flowers in the mirror or the moon in the water. The premier took place at Taipei National Theater, Taipei, Taiwan on November 18, 1998. Cloud Gate Dance Theater was invited to perform this dance during the Sydney Olympic Arts Festival on August 19, 2000.

== Choreography and Soundtrack ==
The choreography is composed of movements of Tai chi and Ballet. “Moon Water” reveals lightness such as touching the water surface as well as the power of calmness. This dance attempts to present the cycles of life and the beauty of illusion by utilizing water and mirrors. The soundtrack comprises Baroque cello solo music by Johann Sebastian Bach.

== Designers ==
Lighting: Chang, ChanTao

Stage: Wang, MengChao

Costume Design: Lin, JingZhu

Since 1999, Cloud Gate Dance Theater has toured in England twelve times, of which ten visits were invited by Sadler's Wells Theatre, London. During the COVID-19 pandemic, almost all theaters were closed. Sadler’s Wells presented a Streaming video of “Moon Water” from May 15, 2020 to May 22nd 2020 on its Facebook pages and YouTube. The last performance of “Moon Water” was held at Cloud Gate Dance Theater's headquarters in Tamshui, Taiwan on November 20, 2016. Cloud Gate has no plan to revive this piece.
