= Jewelry Box (Shizuka Kudo album) =

Studio album by Shizuka Kudo
- Released: July 3, 2002
- Genre: Pop
- Length: 57:07
- Label: Extasy Japan
- Producer: Shizuka Kudo

Shizuka Kudo chronology
Shizuka Kudo Best (2001)	Jewelry Box (2002)	Shōwa no Kaidan Vol. 1 (2002)

Singles from Jewelry Box
- 1. "Shinku no Hana" Released: November 8, 2000; 2. "Maple" Released: April 24, 2002

Jewelry Box is the fifteenth studio album by Japanese singer Shizuka Kudo. It was released on July 3, 2002, through Extasy Japan. It is her first studio album in three years, since Full of Love. It is also Kudo's first and only studio album released under the label Extasy Japan.

== Commercial performance ==
Jewelry Box debuted at number 60 on the Oricon Albums Chart. It charted for a single week in the top 300 and sold a total of 4,000 copies, as reported by Oricon.

== Track listing ==
No.	Title	Writer(s)	Arranger(s)	Length
1.	"Maple"	Aeri; Satoru Sugawara	Sugawara	5:31
2.	"My Dear"	Chokkyū Murano; Mizuki	Shinobu Narita	5:47
3.	"Us"	Aeri; Ayumi Miyazaki	Tsukada	4:17
4.	"Ashimoto o Kazaru Taiyō" (足下を飾る太陽, "The Sun Gracing My Feet")	Aeri; Kazunori Fujimoto	Taisuke Sawachika	4:38
5.	"Endless World"	Naho; Takashi Iioka	Sawachika	5:14
6.	"Wonderful Moment"	Mayumi Kunioka; Kazuyuki Miyauchi	Miyauchi; Takarō Nozaki	5:35
7.	"Hōsekibako" (宝石箱, "Jewelry Box")	Toko Furuuchi	Hideyuki Komatsu	5:48
8.	"Shinku no Hana"	Tomomi Tachibana; Yoshiki	Yoshiki	4:43
9.	"Believe Again"	Naho; Miki Watanabe	Narita	4:59
10.	"Pray"	Aeri; Naoshi Tsuda	Narita	3:56
11.	"Maple" (Remix)	Aeri; Sugawara	Hiroshi Watanabe	6:39
Total length:				57:07

== Charts ==
Chart (2002)	Peak position
Japan Weekly Albums (Oricon)	60
