= Doing (album) =

Studio album by Shizuka Kudo
- Released: May 17, 1996
- Genres: Pop; trip hop
- Length: 55:19
- Label: Pony Canyon
- Producer: Shizuka Kudo

Shizuka Kudo chronology
Purple (1995)	Doing (1996)	She: Best of Best (1996)

Singles from Doing
- 1. "7" Released: November 20, 1995; 2. "Chō" Released: March 21, 1996

Doing (stylized as doing) is the eleventh studio album by Japanese singer Shizuka Kudo. It was released on May 17, 1996, through Pony Canyon. The album's title is a nod to Kudo's active lifestyle and busy work schedule at the time of recording the album, which she was "doing" while filming two movies.

== Critical reception ==
Kudo received acclaim for her vocal performance throughout the album: CDJournal critics praised her singing in a put-on "coqquetish" lisping voice, as well as regarding her low notes on "7" as well executed, and noted that Kudo's voice is best suited for ballads, despite also performing well on the more uptempo tracks of the record.

== Commercial performance ==
Doing debuted at number 16 on the Oricon Albums Chart, with 20,000 units sold in its first week, marking Kudo's first album to debut outside of the top ten. It charted in the top 100 for five weeks, selling a reported total of 52,000 copies during its run.

== Track listing ==
All lyrics are written by Aeri.

No.	Title	Music	Arranger(s)	Length
1.	"Loving"	Hideya Nakazaki	Nakazaki	5:09
2.	"Luna (Tsuki no Megami)" (ルナ -月の女神-, Runa "Luna (Moon Goddess)")	Sakiburō Suzuki	Taisuke Sawachika	4:46
3.	"Melody" (メロディ, Merodi)	Nakazaki	Nakazaki	5:30
4.	"7"	Toshiaki Matsumoto	Akihisa Matsūra	5:46
5.	"Girl"	Matsumoto	Yasushi Suehara	5:22
6.	"Kaze ni Naritai" (風になりたい, "I Want to Become the Wind")	Matsumoto	Satoshi Kadokura	6:09
7.	"Sepia no Kuchizuke" (セピアの口づけ, "Sepia Kiss")	Arata Tanimoto	Suehara	5:03
8.	"Ajisai" (紫陽花, "Hydrangea")	Takashi Tsushimi	Sawachika	5:58
9.	"Chō"	Naoyuki Fujī; Aeri; Matsūra	Matsūra	5:11
10.	"Tsubasa o Hirogete" (翼を広げて, "Spread Your Wings")	Matsumoto	Matsūra	6:25
Total length:				55:19

== Charts ==
Chart (1996)	Peak position	Sales
Japan Weekly Albums (Oricon)	16	52,000
