= Expose (Shizuka Kudo album) =

Studio album by Shizuka Kudo
- Released: September 7, 1994
- Genres: Pop; rock
- Length: 53:39
- Label: Pony Canyon
- Producer: Shizuka Kudo

Shizuka Kudo chronology
| Super Best (1993) | Expose (1994) | Purple (1995) |

Singles from Expose
- 1. "Blue Rose" Released: March 18, 1994; 2. "Jaguar Line" Released: July 21, 1994

Expose is the ninth studio album by Japanese singer Shizuka Kudo. It was released on September 7, 1994, through Pony Canyon. The album was recorded and mastered in Los Angeles. Expose is Kudo's first self-produced album. It yielded the two singles, "Blue Rose" and "Jaguar Line".

== Critical reception ==
Kudo was praised for her "headstrong" approach to the new "hard" sound of the album. CDJournal critics positively noted Kudo's "exhilarated" vocal performance, describing it as a mix between a traditionally Japanese singing technique and a more Western influenced one. She received acclaim for tackling the "tightrope act of balancing these two opposite styles".

== Commercial performance ==
Expose debuted at number five on the Oricon Albums Chart, with 53,000 units sold in its first week. The album dropped eight positions to number thirteen on its second week, with 29,000 copies sold. It charted in the top 100 for eight consecutive weeks, selling a reported total of 124,000 copies during its run.

== Track listing ==
All lyrics are written by Aeri.

| No. | Title | Music | Arranger(s) | Length |
|---|---|---|---|---|
| 1. | "Blue Rose" | Takashi Tsushimi | Taisuke Sawachika | 4:38 |
| 2. | "Sameteku Oto" (冷めてく音, "Cooled Sound") | Ichirō Hada | Hada | 4:59 |
| 3. | "Yume" (夢, "Dream") | Ryō Asuka | Sawachika | 5:44 |
| 4. | "Boku Yoru Ii Hito to..." (僕よりいい人と…, "With Someone Better Than Me...") | Tsushimi | Sawachika | 5:06 |
| 5. | "Naked Love" | Toshiaki Matsumoto | Sawachika | 4:54 |
| 6. | "Jazzy na Koneko" (Jazzyな子猫, "Jazzy Kitten") | Kisaburō Suzuki | Hada | 3:58 |
| 7. | "Adamas (Seifuku Sarezaru Mono)" (Adamas～征服されざる者, "Adamas (The Unconquerable)") | Hada | Hada | 4:01 |
| 8. | "I'm Nothing to You" | Matsumoto | Hada | 6:29 |
| 9. | "Step" | Asuka | Sawachika | 4:29 |
| 10. | "Pain" | Suzuki | Sawachika | 5:15 |
| 11. | "Jaguar Line" | Masaya Ozeki | Hada | 4:06 |
| Total length: | | | | 53:39 |

== Charts ==
| Chart (1994) | Peak position |
|---|---|
| Japan Weekly Albums (Oricon) | 5 |

== Certification ==
| Region | Certification | Certified units/sales |
|---|---|---|
| Japan (RIAJ) | Gold | 200,000^{^} |
^{^} Shipments figures based on certification alone.

== Release history ==
| Region | Date | Format(s) | Label | Ref. |
|---|---|---|---|---|
| Japan | August 2, 1994 | CD; cassette | Pony Canyon | |
| Various | January 1, 2013 | Digital download | Pony Canyon | |
