= Jaguar Line =

Single by Shizuka Kudo

from the album Expose
- Released: July 21, 1994
- Genre: Pop; dance-rock
- Length: 4:09
- Label: Pony Canyon
- Songwriter(s): Aeri; Masaya Ozeki
- Producer(s): Shizuka Kudo; Ichirō Hada

Shizuka Kudo singles chronology
"Blue Rose" (1994)	"Jaguar Line" (1994)	"Ice Rain" (1994)

Audio sample
- "Jaguar Line": file; help

"Jaguar Line" is a song recorded by Japanese singer Shizuka Kudo, from her ninth studio album, Expose. It was released through Pony Canyon as the album's second and final single on July 21, 1994.

== Background ==
"Jaguar Line" was written by Kudo, under the pseudonym Aeri, and Masaya Ozeki. It is the second consecutive single penned and produced by Kudo. The song is written in the key of G minor and set to a tempo of 110 beats per minute. Kudo's vocals span from G_{3} to B♭_{4} in modal voice, and to D_{5} in head voice. The track is as an electronic dance-rock number. It has been compared to the sound of The Chemical Brothers and described as a far cry from the idol days of Kudo. She received positive feedback for challenging herself by branching out into different genres. The song is cited as experimental and indicative of Kudo's personal artistic growth. Lyrically, the song chronicles the adventure of the narrator who presents herself as a metaphorical jaguar moving through the Savannah and being pursued by a hunter, facing a kill-or-be-killed predicament.

== Live performances ==
Kudo's live performances of "Jaguar Line" followed the same style as her previous single, "Blue Rose": revealing outfits and a sultry choreography, created by TRF's Chiharu. Kudo performed the song in a leopard print one-shoulder crop top, mini skirt and knee-high boots and was accompanied by two backup dancers.

== Cover versions ==
In 1995, Priscilla Chan recorded a cover of the song for her album, Welcome Back, on which it is dubbed "Love Is Not Clear" (不清晰的戀愛). As well as regularly performing it in concert when they were on the come up, Namie Amuro and the Super Monkey's covered the song on the AX music show The Yoru mo Hit Parade in 1994.

== Chart performance ==
The single debuted at number eight on the Oricon Singles Chart, selling 57,000 copies in its first week. It slid to number nine on its second week, holding on to the top ten with 44,000 copies sold. It spent a total of 12 weeks in the top 100.

== Track listing ==
All lyrics are written by Aeri

No.	Title	Music	Arranger(s)	Length
1.	"Jaguar Line"	Masaya Ozeki	Ichirō Hada	4:09
2.	"Naked Love"	Toshiaki Matsumoto	Taisuke Sawachika	4:58
3.	"Jaguar Line" (Original Karaoke)	Ozeki	Hada	4:09
Total length:				13:16

== Charts ==
Chart (1994)	Peak position
Japan Weekly Singles (Oricon)	8
Japan Monthly Singles (Oricon)	14

== Certification ==
Region	Certification	Certified units/sales
Japan (RIAJ)	Gold	200,000^{^}
^{^} Shipments figures based on certification alone.
