= Ice Rain (song) =

Single by Shizuka Kudo

from the album Purple
- Released: November 18, 1994
- Genre: Pop
- Length: 6:03
- Label: Pony Canyon
- Songwriters: Aeri; Takashi Tsushimi
- Producers: Shizuka Kudo; Satoshi Kadokura

Shizuka Kudo singles chronology
"Jaguar Line" (1994)	"Ice Rain" (1994)	"Moon Water" (1995)

Audio sample
- "Ice Rain": file; help

"Ice Rain" is a song recorded by Japanese singer Shizuka Kudo for her tenth studio album, Purple. It was released through Pony Canyon as the album's lead single on November 18, 1994, merely two months following the release of her ninth studio album, Expose. The single was released simultaneously with Kudo's third video album, Female III. An English version of the song was recorded for the compilation album, Best of Ballade: Current (1998). In 2015, DAM asked their users to select their favorite Shizuka Kudo songs to sing karaoke to and compiled a top ten list; "Ice Rain" came in at number three and was the only song penned by Kudo to make the top ten.

== Background ==
"Ice Rain" was written by Kudo, under the pseudonym Aeri, and Takashi Tsushimi. It is written in the key of B-flat major and set to a tempo of 69 beats per minute. Kudo's vocals span from F_{3} to D_{5}. Lyrically, the song deals with the theme of heartbreak. Kudo describes a love story coming to an end and the pain associated with letting go and moving on. The narrator compares the dissolution of a relationship to entering the period of winter and laments the warmth of her lover slowly turning into "white snow". The peaceful ballad has been praised for being one of the most enduring songs of its era. Kudo received acclaim for her emotional vocal performance and her heartfelt lyrics.

== Chart performance ==
The single debuted at number eight on the Oricon Singles Chart, selling 66,000 copies in its first week. It slid to number ten on its second week, but outsold its first week sales figures with 68,000 copies sold. It held on to the number ten position on its third charting week, selling 43,000 copies sold. The single stayed in the top 100 for a total of 15 weeks. With only its first week sales counting towards the year-end tally for 1994, it did not reach the top 100. The single, however, ranked at number 96 on the year-end Oricon Singles Chart for 1995, with its additional sales exceeding 347,000 copies.

== Track listing ==
All lyrics are written by Aeri; all music is composed by Takashi Tsushimi.

No.	Title	Arranger(s)	Length
1.	"Ice Rain"	Satoshi Kadokura	6:03
2.	"Party"	Taisuke Sawachika	4:12
3.	"Ice Rain" (Original Karaoke)	Kadokura	5:59
Total length:			16:14

== Charts ==
Chart (1994–95)	Peak position
Japan Weekly Singles (Oricon)	8
Japan Monthly Singles (Oricon)	11
Japan Yearly Singles (Oricon)	96

== Certification ==
Region	Certification	Certified units/sales
Japan (RIAJ)	Gold	414,000
