= Kama Sutra no Densetsu =

Single by Shizuka Kudo

from the album I'm Not
- Released: November 19, 1997
- Genre: Pop-rock
- Length: 4:53
- Label: Pony Canyon
- Songwriter(s): Aeri; Hatake
- Producer(s): Hatake

Shizuka Kudo singles chronology
"Blue Velvet" (1997)	"Kama Sutra no Densetsu" (1997)	"Setsu Getsu Ka" (1998)

Audio sample
- "Kama Sutra no Densetsu": file; help

"Kama Sutra no Densetsu" (カーマスートラの伝説(でんせつ), lit. "The Legend of Kama Sutra") is a song recorded by Japanese singer Shizuka Kudo for her thirteenth studio album, I'm Not. It was released by Pony Canyon as the album's second and last single on November 19, 1997.

== Background ==
"Kama Sutra no Densetsu" was written by Shizuka Kudo, under the pseudonym Aeri, and Sharam Q guitarist and leader Hatake. It is the second consecutive single produced by Hatake. "Kama Sutra no Densetsu" is composed in the key of G-sharp minor and Kudo's vocals span from G♯_{3} to C♯_{5}. Lyrically, the song deals with the theme of female persuasion.

== Chart performance ==
The single debuted at number 29 on the Oricon Singles Chart, selling 15,000 copies in its first week. It fell to number 48 the following week, with sales of 7,000 copies. "Kama Sutra no Densetsu" stayed in the top 100 for a total of seven weeks.

== Track listing ==
All lyrics are written by Aeri; all music is composed by Hatake

No.	Title	Arranger(s)	Length
1.	"Kama Sutra no Densetsu" (カーマスートラの伝説, "The Legend of Kama Sutra")	Hatake	4:53
2.	"Niji" (虹, "Rainbow")	Hatake	4:54
3.	"Kama Sutra no Densetsu" (Original Karaoke)	Hatake	4:53
Total length:			14:40

== Charts ==
Chart (1997)	Peak position	Sales
Japan Weekly Singles (Oricon)	29	37,000
