= Amayo no Tsuki ni =

Single by Shizuka Kudo
- Released: May 23, 2007
- Genre: Pop
- Length: 5:05
- Label: Pony Canyon
- Songwriter(s): Aeri; Hiroo Yamaguchi

Shizuka Kudo singles chronology
"Clāvis (Kagi)" (2006)	"Amayo no Tsuki ni" (2007)	"Night Wing" / "Yukigasa" (2008)

Audio sample
- file; help

"Amayo no Tsuki ni" (雨夜(あまよ)の月(つき)に, lit. "The Moon On a Rainy Night") is a song recorded by Japanese singer Shizuka Kudo. It was released as a single by Pony Canyon on May 23, 2007. It served as the theme song to the CX daytime television series Uruwashiki Oni. The song made its first album appearance on the memorial compilation album, Shizuka Kudo 20th Anniversary the Best, released later that same year.

== Background and composition ==
"Amayo no Tsuki ni" was written by Shizuka Kudo, under the pseudonym Aeri, and Hiroo Yamaguchi, who also arranged the track. It is Kudo's first single on which she is credited as a lyricist in two years, since "Lotus (Umareshi Hana)", which she also co-wrote with Yamaguchi. "Amayo no Tsuki ni" is described as a midtempo song with a dramatic string-based accompaniment. Lyrically, the song describes a protagonist's proclamation of unwavering love to her companion, whom she vows to stand by through rain and thunder and be the "moon on a rainy night". The song is composed in the key of C-sharp minor and set to a tempo of 91 beats per minute, while Kudo's vocals span from G♯_{3} to C_{5}.

== Critical reception ==
Barks praised Kudo for the natural tone of her singing voice and for delivering an emotive vocal performance. The track received acclaim from CDJournal critics for its "simple and tight" sound and elegant string ensemble. Kudo received praise from CDJournal for "singing with an impressive amount of pheromones, without fail".

== Chart performance ==
"Amayo no Tsuki ni" debuted at number 44 on the Oricon Singles Chart, selling 4,000 copies in its first week, and charted for six weeks. The song performed well digitally, ranking at number 19 on the mid-year Mora Chaku-Uta Full Singles Chart.

== Track listing ==
No.	Title	Writer(s)	Arranger(s)	Length
1.	"Amayo no Tsuki ni" (雨夜の月に, "The Moon On a Rainy Night")	Aeri; Hiroo Yamaguchi	Kunio Kubota	5:05
2.	"Sonzai" (存在, "Existence")	Gorō Matsui; H-Wonder	H-Wonder	4:40
3.	"Amayo no Tsuki ni" (Less Vocal)	Yamaguchi	Kubota	5:04
Total length:				14:49

== Charts ==
Chart (2007)	Peak position	Sales
Japan Weekly Singles (Oricon)	44	8,000
