= Setsu Getsu Ka =

Single by Shizuka Kudo
- Released: February 18, 1998
- Genre: Pop
- Length: 4:48
- Label: Pony Canyon
- Songwriter(s): Miyuki Nakajima
- Producer(s): Miyuki Nakajima; Ichizō Seo

Shizuka Kudo singles chronology
"Kama Sutra no Densetsu" (1997)	"Setsu Getsu Ka" (1998)	"Kirara" (1998)

Audio sample
- "Setsu Getsu Ka": file; help

"Setsu Getsu Ka" (雪(せつ)・月(げつ)・花(か); lit. "Snow, Moon, and Flowers") is a song recorded by Japanese singer Shizuka Kudo. It was released as a single by Pony Canyon on February 18, 1998. The song served as one of the theme songs to the tanpatsu dramas aired in 1998 on CX's Kinyō Entertainment time slot. "Setsu Getsu Ka" made its first album appearance on the compilation album, Best of Ballade: Current.

== Background and composition ==
"Setsu Getsu Ka" was written by Miyuki Nakajima and arranged by Ichizō Seo. It marks Kudo's second single to be produced by Nakajima and Seo, the first being "Gekijō". The song is composed in the key of B minor and Kudo's vocals span from B_{3} to A_{4} in modal voice, and up to C_{5} in head voice. Lyrically, Nakajima writes about a protagonist's frustrations with a lover unwilling to be vulnerable with her, imploring her subject to "set her free from the loneliness". Kudo was praised for her earnest interpretation of Nakajima's lyrics.

== Cover version ==
Nakajima first covered the song in concert during her Miyuki Nakajima Concert Tour 1998 tour. She later recorded her own version of the song, which was released in 2002 on the album, Otogibanashi: Fairy Ring.

== Chart performance ==
The single debuted at number 23 on the Oricon Singles Chart, selling 21,000 copies in its first week. It fell to number 34 the following week, with sales of 13,000 copies. "Setsu Getsu Ka" stayed in the top 100 for a total of twelve weeks.

== Track listing ==
No.	Title	Writer(s)	Arranger(s)	Length
1.	"Setsu Getsu Ka" (雪・月・花, "Snow, Moon, and Flowers")	Miyuki Nakajima	Ichizō Seo	4:48
2.	"Wish"	Aeri; Taisuke Sawachika	Sawachika	4:28
3.	"Setsu Getsu Ka" (Original Karaoke)	Nakajima	Seo	4:48
Total length:				14:04

== Charts ==
Chart (1998)	Peak position	Sales
Japan Weekly Singles (Oricon)	23	89,000
