= Chō (Shizuka Kudo song) =

Single by Shizuka Kudo

from the album Doing
- Released: March 21, 1996
- Genre: Pop
- Length: 5:10
- Label: Pony Canyon
- Songwriter(s): Aeri; Naoyuki Fujii; Akihisa Matsūra
- Producer(s): Shizuka Kudo; Akihisa Matsūra

Shizuka Kudo singles chronology
"7" (1995)	"Chō" (1996)	"Yū" (1996)

Audio sample
- file; help

"Chō" (蝶(ちょう), lit. "Butterfly") is a song recorded by Japanese singer Shizuka Kudo for her eleventh studio album, Doing. It was released through Pony Canyon as the album's second and last single on March 21, 1996. The song featured on TV commercials for the Takano Yuri Beauty Clinic. The B-side, "Melody", served as ending theme to the 1996 AX tanpatsu drama Ren'ai Zenya: Ichido Dake. "Chō" is the second in a consecutive trilogy of singles with titles made up of only one character: "Chō" is preceded by "7" and followed by "Yū". It is Kudo's last single to be released in cassette format.

== Background ==
"Chō" was co-written by Kudo, under the pseudonym Aeri, The Checkers's Naoyuki Fujii and Akihisa Matsūra. It is written in the key of A minor. Kudo's vocals span two octaves; from A_{3} to E♭_{5} in modal voice, and A_{5} in head voice. During the recording, Kudo suggested a few changes to the melody to Fujii, who chiefly worked on the demo for the track, which were kept on the final cut of the song. "Chō" is the first single on which Kudo is credited for writing the music of the title track. Lyrically, the song describes the fleeting nature of love. The narrator compares it to the short life of a butterfly.

The single's coupling song, "Melody", written by Aeri and Hideya Nagazaki, was originally intended to be released as the A-side, but as the song started coming together, it was decided that the showier "Chō" would be made into a single instead.

== Chart performance ==
The single debuted at number 15 on the Oricon Singles Chart, selling 32,000 copies in its first week. It spent a total of five weeks in the top 100.

== Track listing ==
All lyrics are written by Aeri

No.	Title	Music	Arranger(s)	Length
1.	"Chō" (蝶, "Butterfly")	Naoyuki Fujii; Akihisa Matsūra	Matsūra	5:10
2.	"Melody" (メロディ, Merodi)	Aeri; Hideya Nagazaki	Nagazaki	5:32
3.	"Chō" (Original Karaoke)	Matsumoto	Matsūra	5:10
Total length:				15:52

== Charts ==
Chart (1996)	Peak position	Sales
Japan Weekly Singles (Oricon)	15	73,000
