= 7 (Shizuka Kudo song) =

Single by Shizuka Kudo

from the album Doing
- Released: November 20, 1995
- Genre: Pop; trip hop
- Length: 5:47
- Label: Pony Canyon
- Songwriters: Aeri; Toshiaki Matsumoto
- Producers: Shizuka Kudo; Akihisa Matsūra

Shizuka Kudo singles chronology
"Moon Water" (1995)	"7" (1995)	"Chō" (1996)

Audio sample
- file; help

"7" is a song recorded by Japanese singer Shizuka Kudo for her eleventh studio album, Doing. It was released by Pony Canyon as the album's lead single on November 20, 1995. The song was the ending theme to the AX variety show TV Oja Mammoth, while the single's B-side, "Hachigatsu..." was featured on the AX tanpatsu drama Ren'ai Zenya: Ichido Dake (1996), on which Kudo appeared in a supporting role. "7" is the first in a consecutive trilogy of singles with one-character titles: "7" is followed by "Chō" and "Yū".

== Background ==
"7" was written by Kudo, under the pseudonym Aeri, and Toshiaki Matsumoto. It is written in the key of A-flat minor. Kudo's vocals span from E_{3} to B_{4}. The title refers to the good luck superstition of the number seven. The song has been described as downtempo-like. Lyrically, it deals with the feeling of lust. In the song, the narrator calls for her companion to be a competent lover and to not let her down. Kudo's vocal performance was praised for its captivating low notes. The coupling song, "Hachigatsu...", is one of the few songs for which Kudo provides both lyrics and music.

== Chart performance ==
The single debuted at number 15 on the Oricon Singles Chart, selling 42,000 copies in its first week. It charted a total of eight weeks in the top 100.

== Track listing ==
All lyrics are written by Aeri.

No.	Title	Music	Arranger(s)	Length
1.	"7"	Toshiaki Matsumoto	Akihisa Matsūra	5:47
2.	"Hachigatsu..." (8月…, "August...")	Aeri	Taisuke Sawachika	4:58
3.	"7" (Original Karaoke)	Matsumoto	Matsūra	5:44
Total length:				16:29

== Charts ==
Chart (1995)	Peak position	Sales
Japan Weekly Singles (Oricon)	15	83,000
