= Love Letter (Miyuki Nakajima album) =

Love Letter (Koibumi)

Studio album by Miyuki Nakajima
- Released: November 19, 2003
- Recorded: at the Cello, O'Henry Sound, and Record Plant Recording Studios (L.A.); Epicurus Studios (Tokyo)
- Genre: Folk rock
- Length: 56:49
- Label: Yamaha Music Communications
- Producer: Ichizo Seo, Miyuki Nakajima

Miyuki Nakajima chronology
Otogibanashi: Fairy Ring (2002)	Love Letter (Koibumi) (2003)	Ima no Kimochi (2004)

Love Letter (恋文, Koibumi) is the 31st studio album by Japanese singer-songwriter Miyuki Nakajima, released in November 2003.

The lead-off track of the album "Ride on the Silver Dragon's Back" was featured as a theme song for the television drama series Dr. Coto's Clinic first aired on Fuji TV in July 2003. A song was released as a single prior to the album, debuted at the number-four on the Oricon and remained on the chart for over 10 months. The album also includes her own rendition of the song "Kiss Old Memories Goodbye" which was initially recorded and released as a single by Kou Shibasaki. Original recording by Shibasaki was also featured on Dr.Coto which she acted the role of nurse.

Some of the songs on the album like "Mirage Hotel" and "The Mistress' Testimony" were also performed on her musical Yakai Vol.14 "24-Ji Chaku 0-Ji Hatsu", which was mounted at the Bunkamura Theatre Cocoon in January 2004 and later released on DVD.

== Track listing ==
All songs written and composed by Miyuki Nakajima, arranged by Ichizo Seo

1. "Ride on the Silver Dragon's Back (銀の龍の背に乗って, Gin no Ryū no Se ni Notte)" – 6:16
2. "Doesn't Have to Be Love (恋とはかぎらない, Koi to wa Kagiranai)" – 4:35
3. "River Breeze (川風, Kawakaze)" – 5:21
4. "The Mirage Hotel" – 6:59
5. "I'm Your Gentle Breeze (寄り添う風, Yorisou Kaze)" – 5:45
6. "The Mistress' Testimony (情婦の証言, Joufu no Shougen)" – 5:10
7. "Nightcap Special" – 5:06
8. "Moonlit Boat Ride (月夜同舟, Getsuya Doushū)" – 5:21
9. "Love Letter (恋文, Koibumi)" [Album version] – 6:38
10. "Kiss Old Memories Goodbye (思い出だけではつらすぎる, Omoide Dake de wa Tsurasugiru)" – 5:38

== Personnel ==
- Miyuki Nakajima – Lead and harmony vocals
- Vinnie Colaiuta – Drums
- Neil Stubenhaus – Electric bass
- Michael Thompson – Electric guitar, acoustic guitar
- Masayoshi Furukawa – Electric guitar
- Jon Gilutin – Acoustic piano, electric piano, hammond organ, keyboards, hammond organ
- Ichizo Seo – Keyboards
- Elton Nagata – Keyboards
- Keishi Urata – Synth programming, drum loop, percussion programming
- Tomō Satō – Synth programming, acoustic guitar, drum loop, percussion programming
- Suzie Katayama – Strings conductor
- Sid Page – Violin (Concertmaster)
- Joel Derouin – Violin (Concertmaster)
- Eve Butler – Violin
- Darius Campo – Violin
- Susan Chatman – Violin
- Mario De Leon – Violin
- Bruce Dukov – Violin
- Alyssa Park – Violin
- Armen Garabedian – Violin
- Benj Garabedian – Violin
- Cameron Patrlck – Violin
- Michele Richards – Violin
- Charlie Bisharat – Violin
- Peter Kent – Violin
- Ruth Bruegger-Johnson – Violin
- Bob Peterson – Violin
- Josefina Vergara – Violin
- Mark Robertson – Violin
- Miwako Watanabe – Violin
- John Wittenberg – Violin
- Larry Corbett – Cello
- Dan Smith – Cello
- Stefanie Fife – Cello
- Steve Richards – Cello
- Rudy Stein – Cello
- Bob Becker – Viola
- Darrin McCann – Viola
- Fumikazu Miyashita- Vocals
- Kazuyo Sugimoto – Harmony vocals
- Julia Waters – Backing vocals
- Maxine Waters – Backing vocals
- Oren Waters – Backing vocals
- Carmen Twillie – Backing vocals
- Maxi Anderson – Backing vocals

== Chart positions ==
=== Album ===
Year	Album	Chart	Position	Weeks	Sales
2003	Love Letter (Koibumi)	Japanese Oricon Weekly Albums Chart (Top 300)	10	13	94,000+

=== Single ===
Year	Single	B-Side	Chart	Position	Weeks	Sales
2003	"Ride on the Silver Dragon's Back"	"Love Letter"	Japanese Oricon Weekly (top 200)	4	47	214,000

== Release history ==
Country	Date	Label	Format	Catalog number
Japan	November 19, 2003	Yamaha Music Communications	CD	YCCW-00044
Japan	December 3, 2008	Yamaha Music Communications	CD	YCCW-10083
