= Otogibanashi: Fairy Ring =

Otogibanashi -Fairy Ring-

Studio album by Miyuki Nakajima
- Released: October 23, 2002
- Recorded: Cello Studios, O'Henry Sound Studios, and Epicurus
- Genre: Folk rock, kayōkyoku
- Length: 58:07
- Label: Yamaha Music Communications
- Producer: Ichizo Seo, Miyuki Nakajima

Miyuki Nakajima chronology
Singles 2000 (2002)	Otogibanashi -Fairy Ring- (2002)	Love Letter (2003)

Otogibanashi (おとぎばなし) (subtitled "Fairy Ring") is the 30th studio album by Japanese singer-songwriter Miyuki Nakajima, released in October 2002. Like some efforts such as Jidai: Time Goes Around, it mainly consists of her compositions which had previously interpreted by other singers, or performed on the series of her musicals Yakai.

Nakajima had a duet with Masashi Sada on "You Reminds Me of...", a song they wrote for Ken Takakura and Nae Yuki in 1994.

== Track listing ==
All songs written by Miyuki Nakajima (unless otherwise noted), arranged by Ichizo Seo.

1. "Hitsumugiuta (陽紡ぎ唄, Song of Elves Spinning Sunrays)" – 4:05
2. "Shangri-La (シャングリラ, Shangurira)" – 4:54
3. "Fairy Tale (おとぎばなし, Otogi Banashi)" – 4:57
4. "The Snow, the Moon and the Flowers (雪･月･花, Setsu Getsu Ka)" – 4:46
5. Medley: "Fragrant Glass from the Distant Past (匂いガラス, Nioi Garasu)"/"Yasuko's Shoes (安寿子の靴, Yasuko no Kutsu)" (Nakajima/Juro Kara) – 5:35
6. "You Remind Me of... (あの人に似ている, Ano Hito ni Niteiru)" (Masashi Sada/Nakajima) – 6:45
7. "The Ugly Duckling (みにくいアヒルの子, Minikui Ahiru no Ko)" – 5:06
8. "Loved Flower, Unloved Flower (愛される花、愛されぬ花, Aisareru Hana, Aisarenu Hana)" – 4:00
9. "The Clawless Lion (裸爪のライオン, Hadashi no Raion)" (Tsugutoshi Goto/Nakajima) – 5:40
10. "Jacaranda (Purple Sakura) (紫の桜, Murasaki no Sakura)" – 6:24
11. "Sea! (海よ, Umi yo)" – 6:05

== Personnel ==
- Miyuki Nakajima – Vocals
- Masashi Sada – Vocals
- Michael Thompson – Electric guitar, nylon guitar
- Masayoshi Furukawa – Electric guitar
- Song Rui – Electric guitar
- Dean Parks – Mandocello, acoustic guitar, bouzouki, flat mandolin
- Tim Pierce – Flat mandolin
- Jia Pengfang – Erhu
- Neil Stubenhaus – Electric bass
- Reggie Hamilton – Bass
- Vinnie Colaiuta – Drums
- Yūta Saito – Keyboards
- Elton Nagata – Keyboards
- Jon Gilutin – Keyboards, acoustic piano, electric piano, yangqin, pad
- Shingo Kobayashi – Keyboards, drums programming
- Ichizo Seo – Keyboards
- Yousuke Sugimoto – Synth programming, percussion loop
- Keishi Urata – Drums programming, percussion loop, synth programming
- Tomo'o Sato – Drums programming, synth programming, acoustic guitar
- Yoshiaki Sato – Accordion
- Dan Higgins – Tenor sax
- Stephanie Bennett – Irish harp
- John Clarke – Penny whistle
- Julia Waters – Backing vocals
- Maxine Waters – Backing vocals
- Oren Waters – Backing vocals
- Kazuyo Sugimoto – Backing vocals
- People of Yamaha Music Foundation – Chorus
- Suzie Katayama – Strings conductor
- Sid Page – Violin (Concertmaster)
- Charlie Bisharat – Violin
- Joel Derouin – Violin
- Norm Hughes – Violin
- Beri Garabedian – Violin
- Peter Kent – Violin
- Susan Chatman – Violin
- John Wittenberg – Violin
- Amen Garabedian – Violin
- Mark Robertson – Violin
- Carole Mukogawa – Viola
- Damin MaCamn – Viola
- Dan Smith – Cello
- Stefanie Fife – Cello
- Tomoyuki Asagawa – Harp

== Chart positions ==
Year	Album	Chart	Position	Weeks	Sales
2002–03	Otogibanashi -Fairy Ring-	Japanese Oricon Weekly Albums Chart (Top 300)	5	12	78,000+

== Release history ==
Country	Date	Label	Format	Catalog number
Japan	October 23, 2002	Yamaha Music Communications	CD	YCCW-00039
Japan	December 3, 2008	Yamaha Music Communications	CD	YCCW-10082
