= Blue Velvet (Shizuka Kudo song) =

Single by Shizuka Kudo

from the album I'm Not
- Released: May 28, 1997
- Genre: Pop rock
- Length: 3:57
- Label: Pony Canyon
- Songwriters: Aeri; Hatake
- Producer: Hatake

Shizuka Kudo singles chronology
"A.S.A.P." (1997)	"Blue Velvet" (1997)	"Kama Sutra no Densetsu" (1997)

Audio sample
- file; help

"Blue Velvet" is a song recorded by Japanese singer Shizuka Kudo for her thirteenth studio album, I'm Not. It was released by Pony Canyon as the album's leading single on May 28, 1997. It served as the third ending theme song to the Fuji Television anime series Dragon Ball GT, from episode 42 to episode 50. Out of all the artists that have contributed to the series' soundtracks, Kudo is the only one who is unaffiliated with a Being Inc. label. Kudo, who is a self-proclaimed Dragon Ball fan, received an autographed hand-drawn illustration of Goku from series creator Akira Toriyama for her 28th birthday.

"Blue Velvet" is the second in a trilogy of singles with "Blue" in the title: "Blue Velvet" is preceded by "Blue Rose", and followed by "Blue Zone".

== Background and composition ==
"Blue Velvet" is described as a scampering, pop-rock song. The song was written by Shizuka Kudo, under the pseudonym Aeri, and Sharam Q guitarist and leader Hatake. It is composed in the key of E-flat minor and set to a tempo of 108 beats per minute. Kudo's vocals span from C_{4} to C♯_{5} in modal voice, and up to E♭_{5} in head voice. Her vocal performance was praised for its versatility, ranging from powerful belts to soft whispers. Lyrically, the song describes a narrator falling madly in love and her efforts to pin down her lover.

== Live performances ==
When performing "Blue Velvet", Kudo sings the song while enthusiastically tapping the tambourine. In 2007, during her concert celebrating her 20th anniversary, she played the tambourine given by her friend, actress Naoko Iijima, who was in attendance that day.

== Cover versions ==
In 2013, Kumi Koda recorded a cover of the song for her cover album, Color the Cover. She performed the song in duet with Kudo on the CX music show Bokura no Ongaku during the album's promotional cycle. In 2017, Yūki Kaji recorded a cover for the tribute album, Shizuka Kudo Tribute. Singer Brina Palencia recorded the English version of the song to use as the Season 3 credits music for Dragon Ball GT.

== Chart performance ==
The single debuted at number 15 on the Oricon Singles Chart, selling 36,000 copies in its first week. It slid to number 17 the following week, with 31,000 copies sold. In its third charting week, the single rose nine positions to number eight, where it peaked and became Kudo's second consecutive solo single to break the top ten, selling 38,000 copies. "Blue Velvet" charted for a total of eleven weeks, and with sales exceeding 200,000 copies, it was certified Gold by the RIAJ.

== Track listing ==
All lyrics are written by Aeri.

No.	Title	Music	Arranger(s)	Length
1.	"Blue Velvet"	Hatake	Hatake	3:57
2.	"Break"	Arata Tanimoto	Akihisa Matsūra	5:00
3.	"Blue Velvet" (Original Karaoke)	Hatake	Hatake	3:53
Total length:				12:50

== Charts ==
Chart (1997)	Peak position
Japan Weekly Singles (Oricon)	8
Japan Monthly Singles (Oricon)	16

== Certification ==
Region	Certification	Certified units/sales
Japan (RIAJ)	Gold	200,000^{^}
^{^} Shipments figures based on certification alone.
