= Blue Rose (song) =

Single by Shizuka Kudo

from the album Expose
- Released: March 18, 1994
- Genre: Pop; rock
- Length: 4:40
- Label: Pony Canyon
- Songwriter(s): Aeri; Takashi Tsushimi
- Producer(s): Shizuka Kudo; Takashi Tsushimi

Shizuka Kudo singles chronology
"Anata Shika Inai Desho" (1993)	"Blue Rose" (1994)	"Jaguar Line" (1994)

Audio sample
- file; help

"Blue Rose" is a song recorded by Japanese singer Shizuka Kudo, from her ninth studio album, Expose. It was released through Pony Canyon as the album's lead single on March 18, 1994. The song marks a significant change in artistic direction for Kudo, as it is her first single to be self-produced, as well as her first release since parting ways with long-time collaborator Tsugutoshi Gotō, who has helmed Kudo's songwriting team since her solo debut. It was featured on TV commercials for Seagaia Ocean Dome. The single's B-side, "Door", is the ending theme to the TX television series Tsumiki Kuzushi: Hōkai, Soshite.... Kudo performed "Blue Rose" on the 45th Kōhaku Uta Gassen, marking her seventh consecutive appearance on the show. It is the first in a trilogy of singles with the word "blue" in the title: "Blue Rose" was later followed by "Blue Velvet" and "Blue Zone".

== Background ==
"Blue Rose" was written by Kudo, under the pseudonym Aeri, and Takashi Tsushimi. It is the first single since "Senryū no Shizuku" to have Kudo credited as a lyricist. The song is written in the key of C♯ minor and set to a tempo of 112 beats per minute. Kudo's vocals span from E_{3} to C♯_{5}. Lyrically, Kudo incarnates a woman putting it all on the line to seduce a man. She likens her actions to that of a "sweet devil" when setting up a "diamond trap" for her lover, and declares herself a "blue angel" promising to find endless love. The song is noted for having a strong rock aesthetic. It was praised for its copious hard guitar riffs, something out of the ordinary coming from Kudo, who received acclaim for unleashing her wild side on the record and amping up the style and glamour, both musically and visually.

== Live performances ==
Kudo's performances of "Blue Rose" are characterized by the accompanying intricate and sensual dance routine, performed alongside multiple backup dancers. The choreography was created by TRF's Sam and Chiharu. Kudo wore a different color variation of the same outfit when performing: a turtleneck crop top, high-slit maxi dress, over-the-knee stockings and platform heels. She wore an all-white version of the ensemble for her Kōhaku Uta Gassen performance. In a retrospective interview, Kudo named Janet Jackson as one of her inspirations for the performance style. Japanese TV personality Mitz Mangrove has praised Kudo for the bold performances and cited her as one of the pioneers of Japanese dancing singers.

== Chart performance ==
The single debuted at number eight on the Oricon Singles Chart, selling 45,000 copies in its first week. It spent a total of 16 weeks in the top 100; it fell off the charts in June, but charted for a week in January 1994, following Kudo's performance on Kōhaku, when it came back at number 97 before dropping off completely the next week. With over 299,000 copies sold in 1993, it came in at number 89 on the year-end Oricon Singles Chart.

== Track listing ==
All lyrics are written by Aeri; all music is composed by Takashi Tsushimi

No.	Title	Arranger(s)	Length
1.	"Blue Rose"	Taisuke Sawachika	4:40
2.	"Door"	Sawachika	4:45
3.	"Blue Rose" (Original Karaoke)	Sawachika	4:40
Total length:			14:06

== Charts ==
Chart (1994)	Peak position
Japan Weekly Singles (Oricon)	8
Japan Monthly Singles (Oricon)	12
Japan Yearly Singles (Oricon)	89

== Certification ==
Region	Certification	Certified units/sales
Japan (RIAJ)	Gold	200,000^{^}
^{^} Shipments figures based on certification alone.
