= Moon Water (song) =

Single by Shizuka Kudo

from the album Purple
- Released: May 19, 1995
- Genre: Pop; rock
- Length: 5:13
- Label: Pony Canyon
- Songwriter(s): Aeri; Arata Tanimoto
- Producer(s): Shizuka Kudo; Taisuke Sawachika

Shizuka Kudo singles chronology
"Ice Rain" (1994)	"Moon Water" (1995)	"7" (1995)

Audio sample
- "Moon Water": file; help

"Moon Water" is a song recorded by Japanese singer Shizuka Kudo, from her tenth studio album, Purple. It was released through Pony Canyon as the album's second single on May 19, 1995. When Kudo appeared on the AX tanpatsu drama Ren'ai Zenya: Ichido Dake 2 (1996) as a drawing-class model, the artwork she was the subject of is revealed to be a direct replication of the "Moon Water" cover art.

== Background ==
"Moon Water" was written by Kudo, under the pseudonym Aeri, and Arata Tanimoto. It is written in the key of B-flat major and set to a tempo of 104 beats per minute. Kudo's vocals span from F_{3} to B♭_{4}. Tanimoto was a classmate of the comedian Takaaki Ishibashi, who Kudo would later go on to record the duet "A.S.A.P." with, which was released as a single in 1997. When Kudo first received Tanimoto's demo for the song, her first impression was that of flowing water. The single's B-side, "Still Water", is a song created around the same demo track but with different lyrics and arrangement.

== Chart performance ==
The single entered the Oricon Singles Chart at number 15, selling 61,000 copies in its first week and becoming Kudo's first single to debut outside of the top ten. It peaked at number 14 on its second week, outselling its first week sales figure with 63,000 copies sold. "Moon Water" became Kudo's first single to not reach the top ten since her solo debut. The single charted a total of seven weeks in the top 100.

== Track listing ==
All lyrics are written by Aeri; all music is composed by Arata Tanimoto

No.	Title	Arranger(s)	Length
1.	"Moon Water"	Taisuke Sawachika	5:13
2.	"Still Water"	Sawachika	5:01
3.	"Moon Water" (Original Karaoke)	Sawachika	5:13
4.	"Still Water" (Original Karaoke)	Sawachika	5:01
Total length:			20:24

== Charts ==
Chart (1995)	Peak position
Japan Weekly Singles (Oricon)	14

== Certification ==
Region	Certification	Certified units/sales
Japan (RIAJ)	Gold	200,000^{^}
^{^} Shipments figures based on certification alone.
