= Clāvis (Kagi) =

Single by Shizuka Kudo
- Released: September 6, 2006
- Genre: Pop
- Length: 5:59
- Label: Pony Canyon
- Songwriter(s): Miyuki Nakajima
- Producer(s): Miyuki Nakajima; Ichizō Seo

Shizuka Kudo singles chronology
"Kokoro no Chikara" (2005)	"Clāvis (Kagi)" (2006)	"Amayo no Tsuki ni" (2007)

Audio sample
- file; help

"Clāvis (Kagi)" (Clāvis -鍵(かぎ)-, lit. "Clāvis (A Key)") is a song recorded by Japanese singer Shizuka Kudo. It was released as a single by Pony Canyon on September 6, 2006. It served as the theme song to the tanpatsu dramas aired from July through September 2006 on AX's Drama Complex time slot.

== Background and composition ==
"Clāvis (Kagi)" was written by Miyuki Nakajima and arranged by Ichizō Seo. It marks Kudo's first collaboration with Nakajima in eight years, since "Setsu Getsu Ka". The title "Clāvis" is latin for "key". Nakajima wrote the song with Kudo in mind. She thought a song with latin influences should be sung by someone with a strong gaze, such as Kudo. Lyrically, the song deals with the theme of self-realization and explores the social nature of people. Nakajima writes about a protagonist "braving seas and people alike" in quest for the "keys of life", which she concludes is an puzzling endeavor. The song is composed in the key of C minor and set to a tempo of 100 beats per minute. Kudo's vocals span one octave, from B♭_{3} to B♭_{4}.

== Critical reception ==
The latin-inspired track was praised for Kudo's ringing vocals and Nakajima's strong storytelling skills; their collaboration was deemed "miraculous". Kudo was praised as a three-dimensional, versatile vocalist; the single's B-side was described by critics as just as well-executed as the main track, in spite of being in a completely different thematic register from "Clāvis".

== Cover version ==
In 2006, Nakajima recorded a cover of the song for her album, Lullaby Singer.

== Chart performance ==
"Clāvis" debuted at number 67 on the Oricon Singles Chart, selling 2,000 copies in its first week, and charted for three weeks.

== Track listing ==
No.	Title	Writer(s)	Arranger(s)	Length
1.	"Clāvis (Kagi)" (Clāvis -鍵-, "Clāvis (A Key)")	Miyuki Nakajima	Ichizō Seo	5:59
2.	"Powder Snow"	Aeri; Jin Nakamura	Nakamura	5:02
3.	"Clāvis (Kagi)" (Less Vocal)	Nakajima	Seo	5:57
Total length:				16:58

== Charts ==
Chart (2006)	Peak position	Sales
Japan Weekly Singles (Oricon)	67	4,000
