= Kirara (song) =

Single by Shizuka Kudo
- Released: July 17, 1998
- Genre: Pop
- Length: 4:54
- Label: Pony Canyon
- Songwriter: ЯK
- Producers: ЯK; Taisuke Sawachika

Shizuka Kudo singles chronology
"Setsu Getsu Ka" (1998)	"Kirara" (1998)	"Isshun" (1998)

Audio sample
- "Kirara": file; help

"Kirara" (きらら; lit. "Glitter") is a song recorded by Japanese singer Shizuka Kudo. It was released as a single by Pony Canyon on July 17, 1998. Both "Kirara" and its coupling song, "In the Sky", were prominently featured on the CX television series, Kamisama, Mō Sukoshi Dake. Kudo performed the song on the 49th Kōhaku Uta Gassen, accompanied by Taro Hakase on the violin, marking her eighth and last appearance on the show. "Kirara" made its first album appearance on the compilation album, Best of Ballade: Current, for which Kudo also recorded an English version of "In the Sky".

== Background ==
"Kirara" was written by Luna Sea lead vocalist, Ryuichi Kawamura, under the pseudonym ЯK. It is composed in the key of E minor and set to a tempo of 136 beats per minute. Kudo's vocals span from A_{3} to D_{5}. The song is described as an ephemeral ballad. Lyrically, the song describes a narrator bearing her soul to her lover and calling for him to embrace and love her for who she truly is.

== Critical reception ==
Kawamura received acclaim for crafting a subtle melody that "conjures up beauty and tenderness" and "tugs at the heart". Kudo was praised for her well-matched and moving vocal performance.

== Cover version ==
In 2001, Kawamura recorded a self-cover for his second studio album, Shin'ai: Only One, which also included his version of "In the Sky".

== Chart performance ==
The single debuted at number 22 on the Oricon Singles Chart, selling 15,000 copies in its first week. It rose to number 21 the following week, selling 21,000 more copies. The single continued to climb the charts until it broke the top ten on its fifth charting week, with 43,000 copies sold. It peaked the following week, coming in at number six with a steady 43,000 copies sold, and scoring Kudo her twenty-sixth and last top ten single. "Kirara" stayed in the top ten for three more weeks, until it dropped to number 13 on its tenth week on the chart. The single spent a total of eighteen weeks in the top 100.

With reported total sales of 384,000, "Kirara" ranked at number 65 on the year-end Oricon Singles Chart.

== Track listing ==
All tracks are written by ЯK.

No.	Title	Arranger(s)	Length
1.	"Kirara" (きらら, "Glitter")	Taisuke Sawachika	4:54
2.	"In the Sky"	Sawachika	4:37
3.	"Kirara" (Original Karaoke)	Sawachika	4:51
Total length:			14:22

== Charts ==
Chart (1998)	Peak position
Japan Weekly Singles (Oricon)	6
Japan Monthly Singles (Oricon)	8
Japan Yearly Singles (Oricon)	65

== Certification ==
Region	Certification	Certified units/sales
Japan (RIAJ)	Platinum	400,000^{^}
^{^} Shipments figures based on certification alone.
