= Akina Nakamori albums discography =

- Studio albums: 25
- EPs: 6
- Live albums: 2
- Compilation albums: 11
- Cover albums: 11
- Box sets: 1

The albums discography of Japanese recording artist Akina Nakamori consists of 25 studio albums, 11 compilation albums, 11 cover albums, two live albums, one box set, and six extended plays.

To date, Nakamori has sold more than 25.7 million records nationwide. She has 22 No. 1 singles and 18 No. 1 albums, being the nineteenth best-selling artist in Japan of all-time.

== Studio albums ==
List of studio albums, with selected chart positions
Title	Album details	Peak positions	Sales	Certifications
Title	Album details	JPN	Sales	Certifications
Prologue	Released: July 1, 1982; Label: Reprise, Warner; Formats: CD, LP, cassette, digital download	5	JPN: 453,100	
Variation	Released: October 27, 1982; Label: Reprise, Warner; Formats: CD, LP, cassette, digital download	1	JPN: 742,900	
Fantasy	Released: March 23, 1983; Label: Reprise, Warner; Formats: CD, LP, cassette, digital download	1	JPN: 615,700	
New Akina Etranger	Released: August 10, 1983; Label: Reprise, Warner; Formats: CD, LP, cassette, digital download	1	JPN: 482,100	
Anniversary	Released: May 1, 1984; Label: Reprise, Warner; Formats: CD, LP, cassette, digital download	1	JPN: 483,400	
Possibility	Released: October 10, 1984; Label: Reprise, Warner; Formats: CD, LP, cassette, digital download	1	JPN: 629,200	
Bitter and Sweet	Released: April 3, 1985; Label: Reprise, Warner; Formats: CD, LP, cassette, digital download	1	JPN: 573,700	
D404ME	Released: August 10, 1985; Label: Reprise, Warner; Formats: CD, LP, cassette, digital download	1	JPN: 651,100	
Fushigi	Released: August 11, 1986; Label: Reprise, Warner; Formats: CD, LP, cassette, digital download	1	JPN: 463,100	IFPI HK: Gold
Crimson	Released: December 24, 1986; Label: Reprise, Warner; Formats: CD, LP, cassette, digital download	1	JPN: 600,800	IFPI HK: Platinum
Cross My Palm	Released: August 25, 1987; Label: Reprise, Warner; Formats: CD, LP, cassette, digital download	1	JPN: 347,700	IFPI HK: Gold
Stock	Released: March 3, 1988; Label: Reprise, Warner; Formats: LP, cassette, CD, digital download	2	JPN: 395,800	IFPI HK: Gold
Femme Fatale	Released: August 3, 1988; Label: Reprise, Warner; Formats: CD, LP, cassette, digital download	1	JPN: 268,800	IFPI HK: Gold
Cruise	Released: July 25, 1989; Label: Reprise, Warner; Formats: CD, LP, cassette, digital download	1	JPN: 327,000	RIAJ: Platinum
Unbalance+Balance	Released: September 22, 1993; Label: MCA Victor; Formats: CD, cassette, digital download	4	JPN: 186,600	RIAJ: Gold
La Alteración	Released: July 21, 1995; Label: MCA Victor; Formats: CD, digital download	7	JPN: 149,100	
Shaker	Released: March 21, 1997; Label: MCA Victor; Formats: CD, digital download	14	JPN: 43,600	
Spoon	Released: June 17, 1998; Label: This One; Formats: CD, digital download	17	JPN: 22,800	
Will	Released: December 1, 1999; Label: This One; Formats: CD, digital download	52	JPN: 4,900	
Resonancia	Released: May 22, 2002; Label: Universal; Formats: CD, digital download	15	JPN: 31,000	
I hope so	Released: May 14, 2003; Label: Universal; Formats: CD, digital download	15	JPN: 18,000	
Destination	Released: June 21, 2006; Label: Universal; Formats: CD, digital download	20	JPN: 10,300	
Diva	Released: August 26, 2009; Label: Universal; Formats: CD, 2-CD, digital download	29	JPN: 6,900	
Fixer	Released: December 30, 2015; Label: Universal; Formats: CD, CD+DVD, digital download	7	JPN: 14,000	
Akina	Released: November 8, 2017; Label: Universal; Formats: CD, digital download	9	JPN: 10,500	
"—" denotes items which did not chart.

== Reissue albums ==
List of reissue albums, with selected chart positions
Title	Album details
Unbalance+Balance+6	Released: December 4, 2002; Label: Universal; Formats: CD, digital download
La Alteración + 4	Released: December 4, 2002; Label: Universal; Formats: CD, digital download
Shaker + 3	Released: December 4, 2002; Label: Universal; Formats: CD, digital download
Belie + Vampire	Released: December 21, 2016; Label: Universal; Formats: CD, LP

== Compilation albums ==
=== Official ===
List of official compilation albums, with selected chart positions
Title	Album details	Peak positions	Sales	Certifications
Title	Album details	JPN	Sales	Certifications
Best Akina Memoires	Released: December 21, 1983; Label: Warner Pioneer; Formats: CD, LP, cassette, digital download	1	JPN: 721,800	
Best	Released: April 1, 1986; Label: Warner Pioneer; Formats: CD, LP, cassette, digital download	1	JPN: 774,200	
Best II	Released: December 24, 1988; Label: Warner Pioneer; Formats: CD, LP, cassette, digital download	1	JPN: 801,000	IFPI HK: Platinum
Best III	Released: November 10, 1992; Label: Warner; Formats: CD, LP, cassette, digital download	6	JPN: 158,700	RIAJ: Gold
True Album Akina 95 Best	Released: December 6, 1995; Label: MCA Victor; Formats: CD, digital download	16	JPN: 86,100	
Utahime Double Decade	Released: December 4. 2002; Label: Universal; Formats: CD, digital download	8	JPN: 83,000	
Best Finger 25th Anniversary Selection	Released: January 11, 2006; Label: Universal; Formats: CD, digital download	29	JPN: 15,800	
Utahime Best 25th Anniversary Selection	Released: January 17, 2007; Label: Universal; Formats: CD, digital download	9	JPN: 43,500	
Ballad Best 25th Anniversary Selection	Released: March 28, 2007; Label: Universal; Formats: CD, digital download	13	JPN: 26,600	
Utahime Densetsu: 90's Best	Released: February 27, 2008; Label: Universal; Formats: CD	37	JPN: 7,700	
All Time Best: Original	Released: August 6, 2014; Label: Universal; Formats: 2CD, 2CD+DVD, digital download	3	JPN: 120,200	RIAJ: Gold
All Time Best: Utahime Cover	Released: August 6, 2014; Label: Universal; Formats: 2CD, digital download	7	JPN: 56,500	
All Time Best: Original & Cover	Released: December 3, 2014; Label: Universal; Formats: 4CD, digital download	—		
Utahime: Stereo Sound Selection	Released: December 21, 2020; Label: Universal; Formats: LP	—		
Utahime: Stereo Sound Selection Vol. 2	Released: September 30, 2021; Label: Universal; Formats: LP	—		
Utahime: Stereo Sound Selection Vol. 3	Released: December 10, 2021; Label: Universal; Formats: LP	—		
Utahime: Stereo Sound Selection Vol. 4	Released: March 24, 2022; Label: Universal; Formats: LP	—		
All Time Best Original: Stereo Sound Selection Vol. 5	Released: July 13, 2022; Label: Universal; Formats: LP	—		
Meikyo: Tribute to Akina Nakamori	Released: May 1, 2025; Label: Warner Music Japan; Formats: CD, 2×CD	—		
Akina Note	Released: May 1, 2026; Label: Warner Music Japan; Formats: CD, 2×CD	5	JPN: 8,981	
"—" denotes items which did not chart.

=== Unofficial ===
These compilations were released by the record labels without direct input from Nakamori.

List of compilation albums, with selected chart positions
Title	Album details	Peak positions
Title	Album details	JPN
Your Selection: The Very Best of Akina	Released: April 25, 1993; Label: Warner; Formats: CD, cassette	—
Lyricism: Ballad Collection	Released: July 10, 1993; Label: Warner; Formats: CD, cassette	—
Akina	Released: November 10, 1993; Label: Warner; Formats: 4CD	—
Mōhitori no Akina	Released: December 10, 1993; Label: Warner; Formats: 2CD, cassette	—
Namida no Kawari ni: Ballad Collection II	Released: March 25, 1994; Label: Warner; Formats: CD, cassette	—
Play with Danger: Rock Collection	Released: March 25, 1994; Label: Warner; Formats: CD, cassette	—
Only Woman: Best of Love Songs	Released: May 18, 1994; Label: Warner; Formats: CD, cassette	—
Singles 27: 1982—1991	Released: November 30, 1994; Label: Warner; Formats: 2CD	—
Super Best	Released: March 4, 1998; Label: Universal Victor; Formats: CD	—
Recollection: Akina Nakamori Super Best	Released: May 25, 1998; Label: WEA; Formats: CD, cassette	—
Regeneration: Nakamori Akina Remix	Released: June 25, 1998; Label: WEA; Formats: CD	—
Regeneration II: Nakamori Akina Remix II	Released: September 25, 1998; Label: WEA; Formats: CD	—
Best Collection	Released: October 21, 1998; Label: Universal; Formats: 2CD	—
Special Best	Released: October 20, 1999; Label: Universal; Formats: CD	—
Akina Nakamori 20th Century Best	Released: November 14, 2001; Label: WEA; Formats: 2CD	—
Super Value	Released: December 19, 2002; Label: Universal; Formats: CD	—
For Dear Friends: Akina Nakamori Single Collection Box	Released: August 21, 2002; Label: Warner; Formats: 4CD	—
Super Best Collection: Akina + East Live	Released: March 7, 2008; Label: Warner; Formats: 4CD + DVD	—
Complete Singles Collection: First Ten Years	Released: March 7, 2008; Label: Rhino; Formats: 4CD	75
Best Collection: Love Songs & Pop Songs	Released: July 11, 2012; Label: Warner; Formats: 2CD	15
Dramatic Airport: Akina Travel Selection	Released: May 29, 2014; Label: Warner; Formats: CD	57
Burning Love: Jōnetsu no Natsu Best	Released: June 18, 2014; Label: Warner; Formats: CD	83
Mini Album Collection	Released: June 18, 2014; Label: Warner; Formats: 5CD	79
"Slow Motion" & "Hajimemashite" Box	Released: May 1, 2022; Label: Warner; Formats: EP + Blu-ray	—
"New Akina Etranger" & "New Akina Etranger: Akina Nakamori in Europe" Box	Released: May 1, 2022; Label: Warner; Formats: 2CD + 2Blu-ray	—
"—" denotes items which did not chart.

=== V.A. ===
These compilations were released including songs by Nakamori in addition to songs by various artists.

List of compilation albums, with selected chart positions
Title	Album details	Peak positions
Title	Album details	JPN
Dear My Company	Released: November 10, 2000; Label: VAP; Formats: CD; Includes duet song "Second Love" with Takao Kisugi	—
Momoe Tribute: Thank You For…	Released: November 8, 2004; Label: SMDR GT Music; Formats: CD; Includes cover song "Aizenbashi"	3
Jewel Songs: Seiko Matsuda Tribute & Covers	Released: December 13, 2006; Label: Sony; Formats: CD; Includes cover "Ruriiro no Chikyū"	48
Otoko to Onna: Two Hearts Two Voices	Released: November 19, 2008; Label: Universal Music Japan; Formats: CD; Includes duet song "Dramatic Rain" with Junichi Inagaki	14
50th Anniversary Special A Tribute of Hayashi Tetsuji: Saudade	Released: November 8, 2023; Label: VAP; Formats: CD; Includes self-cover of "Kita Wing" under subtitle Classic	—
"—" denotes items which did not chart.

== Cover albums ==
List of cover albums, with selected chart positions
Title	Album details	Peak positions	Sales (JPN)	Certifications
Title	Album details	JPN	Sales (JPN)	Certifications
Utahime	Released: March 24, 1994; Label: MCA Victor; Formats: cassette, CD, digital download	5	140,500	
Zero Album: Utahime 2	Released: March 20, 2002; Label: Universal; Formats: CD, digital download	10	229,700	RIAJ: Gold
Utahime 3: Shūmaku	Released: December 3, 2003; Label: Universal; Formats: CD, digital download	25	31,700	
Enka	Released: June 27, 2007; Label: Universal; Formats: CD, cassette, digital download	10	61,400	RIAJ: Gold
Folk Song: Utahime Jojouka	Released: December 24, 2008; Label: Universal; Formats: CD, digital download	30	18,000	
Mood Kayō: Utahime Shōwa Meikyoku Shū	Released: June 24, 2009; Label: Universal; Formats: CD, digital download	30	6,400	
Folk Song 2: Utahime Aishouka	Released: July 29, 2009; Label: Universal; Formats: CD, digital download	33	8,100	
Utahime 4: My Eggs Benedict	Released: August 6, 2014; Label: Universal; Formats: CD, digital download	5	26,500	
Belie	Released: November 30, 2016; Label: Universal; Formats: CD, digital download	8	22,800	
Cage	Released: November 8, 2017; Label: Universal; Formats: CD, digital download	8	11,700	
"—" denotes items which did not chart.

== Live albums ==
List of live albums, with selected chart positions
Title	Album details	Peak positions	Sales (JPN)	Certifications
Title	Album details	JPN	Sales (JPN)	Certifications
Akina East Live Index-XXIII	Released: November 17, 1989; Label: Warner; Formats: CD, cassette, digital download	6	131,300	RIAJ: Gold
Listen to Me	Released: November 28, 1991; Label: Warner; Formats: CD, cassette, digital download	5	183,000	RIAJ: Gold

== Box sets ==
=== Official ===
List of official box sets, with selected chart positions
Title	Album details	Peak positions	Sales (JPN)
Title	Album details	JPN	Sales (JPN)
Utahime Complete Box Empress	Released: December 1, 2004; Label: Warner; Formats: 6CD	158	1,500

=== Unofficial ===
These box sets were released by the record labels without direct input from Nakamori.

List of unofficial box sets, with selected chart positions
Title	Album details	Peak positions
Title	Album details	JPN
Collection 1982—1991	Released: May 1, 1996; Label: Warner; Formats: 16CD	—
The Century of Akina: Warner 30th Anniversary Box	Released: November 22, 2000; Label: Warner; Formats: 10CD	—
Akina Box 1982—1989	Released: June 21, 2006; Label: Warner; Formats: 18CD	97
Akina Box SACD/CD Hybrid Edition 1982—1991	Released: August 27, 2012; Label: Warner; Formats: 18CD	—
Singles Box 1982—1991	Released: June 18, 2014; Label: Warner; Formats: 28CD	104
Anniversary Complete Analog Single Collection 1982—1991	Released: June 9, 2021; Label: Warner; Formats: 28EP + LP + cassette	98
"—" denotes items which did not chart.

== Extended plays ==
List of albums, with selected chart positions
Title	Album details	Peak positions	Sales (JPN)
Title	Album details	JPN	Sales (JPN)
Seventeen	Released: December 24, 1982; Label: Warner; Formats: LP, CD, digital download	1	142,100
Silent Love	Released: December 21, 1984; Label: Warner; Formats: CD, LP, digital download	2	282,000
My Best Thanks	Released: December 21, 1985; Label: Warner; Formats: CD, LP, digital download	1	294,700
CD'87	Released: May 1, 1987; Label: Warner; Formats: CD, digital download	1	159,900
Wonder	Released: June 1, 1988; Label: Warner; Formats: CD, digital download, LP	2	117,600
Vamp	Released: December 18, 1996; Label: MCA Victor; Formats: CD, digital download	30	31,800
Vampire	Released: May 3, 2017; Label: Universal Music Japan; Formats: CD, digital download, LP	48	
"—" denotes items which did not chart.

== See also ==
- Akina Nakamori
- List of best-selling music artists in Japan
