= All Time Best: Original & Cover =

Compilation album by Akina Nakamori
- Released: December 3, 2014
- Recorded: 1982–2014
- Genres: J-pop; kayōkyoku; pop rock; dance-pop; enka; jazz
- Length: 60:59 (Disc 1); 71:11 (Disc 2); 66:54 (Disc 3); 59:13 (Disc 4)
- Language: Japanese
- Label: Universal Music Japan

Akina Nakamori chronology
All Time Best: Utahime Cover (2014)	All Time Best: Original & Cover (2014)	Utahime 4: My Eggs Benedict (2015)

All Time Best: Original & Cover (オールタイム・ベスト ‐オリジナル‐＆‐歌姫（カヴァー）‐, Ōru Taimu Besuto -Orijinaru ando Utahime (Kavā)-) is a compilation album by Japanese entertainer Akina Nakamori, released through Universal Music Japan on December 3, 2014. The album combines Nakamori's 2014 compilations All Time Best: Original and All Time Best: Utahime Cover into a four-disc compilation.

== Track listing ==
Disc 1
No.	Title	Lyrics	Music	Arrangement	Length
1.	"Slow Motion" (Surō Mōshon (スローモーション))	Etsuko Kisugi	Takao Kisugi	Motoki Funayama	4:06
2.	"Shōjo A" ((少女A; "Girl A"))	Masao Urino	Hiroaki Serizawa	Mitsuo Hagita	3:31
3.	"Second Love" (Sekando Rabu (セカンド・ラブ))	E. Kisugi	T. Kisugi	Hagita	4:22
4.	"½ no Shinwa" (Nibun no Ichi no Shinwa (½の神話; "Half the Myth"))	Urino	Yoshiyuki Ohsawa	Hagita	3:19
5.	"Kinku" ((禁区; "Forbidden Zone"))	Urino	Haruomi Hosono	Hagita; Hosono	3:47
6.	"Kita Wing" (Kita Uingu (北ウイング; "North Wing"))	Chinfa Kan	Tetsuji Hayashi	Hayashi	4:35
7.	"Southern Wind" (Sazan Uindo (サザン・ウインド))	E. Kisugi	Kōji Tamaki	Ichizō Seo	3:50
8.	"Jukkai (1984)" (Jukkai (Ichi Kyū Hachi Yon) (十戒 (1984); "Ten Commandments (1984)"))	Urino	Masayoshi Takanaka	Hagita; Takanaka	3:35
9.	"Kazari ja Nai no yo Namida wa" ((飾りじゃないのよ涙は; "The Tears Are Not a Decoration"))	Yōsui Inoue	Y. Inoue	Hagita	4:10
10.	"Meu amor é..." (Mi Amōre (ミ・アモーレ))	Kan	Naoya Matsuoka	Matsuoka	3:52
11.	"Desire (Jōnetsu)" (DESIRE -情熱-)	Yoko Aki	Kisaburō Suzuki	Kazuo Shiina	4:24
12.	"Gypsy Queen" (Jipushī Kuīn (ジプシー・クイーン))	Takashi Matsumoto	Wataru Kuniyasu	Shingo Kobayashi	4:29
13.	"Nanpasen" ((難破船; "Shipwreck"))	Tokiko Kato	Kato	Kei Wakakusa	4:25
14.	"Tattoo"	Yuri Moriko	Anri Sekine	Eurox	3:57
15.	"Futari Shizuka: Tenkawa Densetsu Satsujin Jiken yori" ((二人静 -「天河伝説殺人事件」より; "Two People Still: From The Legendary Tenkawa Murder Case"))	T. Matsumoto	Makoto Sekiguchi	Akira Inoue	4:09
Total length:					60:59

Disc 2
No.	Title	Lyrics	Music	Arrangement	Length
1.	"Everlasting Love"	Taeko Onuki	Ryuichi Sakamoto	R. Sakamoto	4:50
2.	"Aibu" ((愛撫; "Caress"))	T. Matsumoto	Tetsuya Komuro	Komuro	5:14
3.	"Gekka" ((月華; "Moon Flower"))	Gorō Matsui	Shūgō Kajiwara	Akihiko Matsumoto	4:57
4.	"Genshi, Onna wa Taiyō Datta" ((原始、女は太陽だった; "Primitive, the Woman Was the Sun"))	Neko Oikawa	Masaki	Yasunori Iwasaki	4:47
5.	"Moonlight Shadow: Tsuki ni Hoero" ((MOONLIGHT SHADOW-月に吠えろ; "Moonlight Shadow -Howl at the Moon-"))	Toshihiko Takamizawa	Komuro	Komuro	5:07
6.	"Appetite"	Seriko Natsuno	U-ki	U-ki	5:15
7.	"Kisei (Never Forget) (2007 Version)" ((帰省 〜Never Forget〜; "Homecoming ~Never Forget~"))	Yasuhiro Suzu; Atsuko	Suzu	Akira Senju	5:33
8.	"The Heat (Musica Fiesta)"	Adya	Uru	Uru	4:54
9.	"Days"	Nakamori	Tetsurō Oda	Satoshi Takebe	4:57
10.	"Rakka Ryūsui" ((落花流水; "Falling Flower Running Water"))	T. Matsumoto	Kenji Hayashida	Masayuki Sakamoto	4:43
11.	"Hana yo Odore" ((花よ踊れ; "Dance with Flowers"))	Karen	Hitoshi Haba	Hiroshi Uesugi	4:18
12.	"Diva"	Ryohei Matsufuji	Philippe-Marc Anquetil; Chris Lee-Joe; Emma Rohan		3:21
13.	"Crazy Love"	Kōzō Endō; Miran Miran	Fredrik Bostrom; Anna Nordell; Calle Kindbom		3:31
14.	"I Hope So"	Nakamori	Shinjirō Inoue; Takebe	Takebe	4:43
15.	"Sweet Rain"	Matsufuji	Kei Kawano	Kawano	5:08
Total length:					71:11

Disc 3
No.	Title	Lyrics	Music	Original artist	Length
1.	"Dance wa Umaku Odorenai" (Dansu wa Umaku Odorenai (ダンスはうまく踊れない; "I Can't Dance Well"))	Y. Inoue	Y. Inoue	Seri Ishikawa	5:41
2.	"Aizenbashi" ((愛染橋; "Aizen Bridge"))	T. Matsumoto	Takao Horiuchi	Momoe Yamaguchi	4:44
3.	"Momoiro Toiki" ((桃色吐息; "Pink Sigh"))	Kan	Takashi Satō	Mariko Takahashi	3:42
4.	"Single Again" (Shinguru Agein (シングル・アゲイン))	Mariya Takeuchi	Takeuchi	Mariya Takeuchi	4:04
5.	"Cosmos" (Kosumosu (秋桜))	Masashi Sada	Sada	Momoe Yamaguchi	3:54
6.	"Ihōjin" ((異邦人; "The Stranger"))	Saki Kubota	Kubota	Saki Kubota	3:28
7.	"Ruriiro no Chikyū" ((瑠璃色の地球; "Lapis Lazuli Colored Earth"))	T. Matsumoto	Natsumi Hirai	Seiko Matsuda	4:22
8.	"Kasa ga Nai" ((傘がない; "No Umbrella"))	Y. Inoue	Y. Inoue	Yōsui Inoue	6:21
9.	"Mado" ((窓; "Window"))	Chiharu Matsuyama	Matsuyama	Chiharu Matsuyama	4:55
10.	"Ai wa Kagerō" ((愛はかげろう; "Let's Hide the Love"))	Kazuto Miura	Miura	Gamu	4:24
11.	"Koi no Yokan" ((恋の予感; "Feelings of Love"))	Y. Inoue	Tamaki	Anzen Chitai	4:38
12.	"Ichigo Hakusho wo Mōichido" ((『いちご白書』をもう一度; "Strawberry White Paper Again"))	Yumi Arai	Arai	Ban Ban	4:14
13.	"22-sai no Wakare" ((22才の別れ; "A 22-year-old's Farewell"))	Shōzō Ise	Ise	Kaze	3:27
14.	"Koi" ((恋; "Love"))	Matsuyama	Matsuyama	Chiharu Matsuyama	4:22
15.	"Īhi Tabidachi" ((いい日旅立ち; "A Good Day Departure"))	Shinji Tanimura	Tanimura	Momoe Yamaguchi	4:31
Total length:					66:54

Disc 4
No.	Title	Lyrics	Music	Original artist	Length
1.	"Amagi-goe" ((天城越え; "Walk Over Amagi Pass"))	Osamu Yoshioka	Tetsuya Gen	Sayuri Ishikawa	4:45
2.	"Mugonzaka" ((無言坂; "Silent Slope"))	Mutsuki Ichikawa	Tamaki	Kaori Kozai	4:30
3.	"Hisame" ((氷雨; "Icy Rain"))	Ren Tomari	Tomari	Mika Hino	3:50
4.	"Ettō Tsubame" ((越冬つばめ; "Swallow Over Winter"))	Shinichi Ishihara	Yoshihiko Shinohara	Masako Mori	4:02
5.	"Yozakura Oshichi" ((夜桜お七; "Cherry Blossoms at Night"))	Amari Hayashi	Takashi Miki	Fuyumi Sakamoto	5:37
6.	"Koi no Kisetsu" ((恋の季節; "Season of Love"))	Tokiko Iwatani	Taku Izumi	Pinky & Killers	3:02
7.	"Isesakichō Blues" (Isesakichō Burūsu (伊勢佐木町ブルース))	Kōhan Kawauchi	Yōichi Suzuki	Mina Aoe	3:30
8.	"Tanin no Kankei" ((他人の関係; "Relationships with Others"))	Mieko Arima	Makoto Kawaguchi	Katsuko Kanai	3:59
9.	"Nagori Yuki" ((なごり雪; "Relic Snow"))	Ise	Ise	Kaguyahime	3:38
10.	"Akujo" ((悪女; "Bad Woman"))	Miyuki Nakajima	Nakajima	Miyuki Nakajima	4:05
11.	"I Love You"	Yutaka Ozaki	Ozaki	Yutaka Ozaki	4:18
12.	"Velvet Easter (Live Version)" (Berubetto Īsutā (ベルベット・イースター))	Arai	Arai	Yumi Matsutoya	4:08
13.	"Woman: W no Higeki Yori (Live Version)" ((Woman “Wの悲劇より”; "Woman 'From the Tragedy of W'"))	Matsumoto	Karuho Kureta	Hiroko Yakushimaru	3:56
14.	"Koi no Dorei (Bonus Track)" ((恋の奴隷; "Slave of Love"))	Rei Nakanishi	Kunihiko Suzuki	Chiyo Okumura	2:22
15.	"Otoko to Onna no Ohanashi (Bonus Track)" ((男と女のお話; "A Story of a Man and a Woman"))	Kyōsuke Kuni	Masakazu Mizushima	Mimi Hiyoshi	3:24
Total length:					59:13
