= All Time Best: Original =

Compilation album by Akina Nakamori
- Released: August 6, 2014
- Recorded: 1982–2014
- Genres: J-pop; kayōkyoku; pop rock; dance-pop
- Length: 60:59 (Disc 1); 71:11 (Disc 2)
- Language: Japanese
- Label: Universal Music Japan

Akina Nakamori chronology
Diva (2009)	All Time Best: Original (2014)	All Time Best: Utahime Cover (2014)

Singles from All Time Best: Original
- 1. "Crazy Love" Released: June 13, 2010; 2. "Sweet Rain" Released: July 16, 2014

Alternate cover
- Special Edition cover

All Time Best: Original (オールタイム・ベスト -オリジナル-, Ōru Taimu Besuto -Orijinaru-) is a compilation album by Japanese entertainer Akina Nakamori, released through Universal Music Japan on August 6, 2014. The compilation album is divided into two discs: The first disc includes 15 singles from the Warner Pioneer period and the second disc contains 15 singles from the MCA Victor and UMJ eras. It also includes the bonus track "Crazy Love", which was previously released only as a digital single, as well as the new single "Sweet Rain."

The album was released in regular and first-press editions. The first-press edition includes a DVD containing short footage of the acoustic live tour Nakamori Akina 2000: 21 Seiki e no Tabidachi (中森明菜2000『～21世紀への旅立ち～』; Akina Nakamori 2000: Departure to the 21st Century). The Special Edition includes the full version of the acoustic live tour.

== Chart performance ==
The album debuted at No. 3 on Oricon's weekly albums chart and remained in the same position for two consecutive weeks, charted for 39 weeks and became the 46th best sold album in the year. It was certified Gold by RIAJ.

== Track listing ==
Disc 1
No.	Title	Lyrics	Music	Arrangement	Length
1.	"Slow Motion" (Surō Mōshon (スローモーション))	Etsuko Kisugi	Takao Kisugi	Motoki Funayama	4:06
2.	"Shōjo A" ((少女A; "Girl A"))	Masao Urino	Hiroaki Serizawa	Mitsuo Hagita	3:31
3.	"Second Love" (Sekando Rabu (セカンド・ラブ))	E. Kisugi	T. Kisugi	Hagita	4:22
4.	"½ no Shinwa" (Nibun no Ichi no Shinwa (½の神話; "Half the Myth"))	Urino	Yoshiyuki Ohsawa	Hagita	3:19
5.	"Kinku" ((禁区; "Forbidden Zone"))	Urino	Haruomi Hosono	Hagita; Hosono	3:47
6.	"Kita Wing" (Kita Uingu (北ウイング; "North Wing"))	Chinfa Kan	Tetsuji Hayashi	Hayashi	4:35
7.	"Southern Wind" (Sazan Uindo (サザン・ウインド))	E. Kisugi	Kōji Tamaki	Ichizō Seo	3:50
8.	"Jukkai (1984)" (Jukkai (Ichi Kyū Hachi Yon) (十戒 (1984); "Ten Commandments (1984)"))	Urino	Masayoshi Takanaka	Hagita; Takanaka	3:35
9.	"Kazari ja Nai no yo Namida wa" ((飾りじゃないのよ涙は; "The Tears Are Not a Decoration"))	Yōsui Inoue	Y. Inoue	Hagita	4:10
10.	"Meu amor é..." (Mi Amōre (ミ・アモーレ))	Kan	Naoya Matsuoka	Matsuoka	3:52
11.	"Desire (Jōnetsu)" (DESIRE -情熱-)	Yoko Aki	Kisaburō Suzuki	Kazuo Shiina	4:24
12.	"Gypsy Queen" (Jipushī Kuīn (ジプシー・クイーン))	Takashi Matsumoto	Wataru Kuniyasu	Shingo Kobayashi	4:29
13.	"Nanpasen" ((難破船; "Shipwreck"))	Tokiko Kato	Kato	Kei Wakakusa	4:25
14.	"Tattoo"	Yuri Moriko	Anri Sekine	Eurox	3:57
15.	"Futari Shizuka: Tenkawa Densetsu Satsujin Jiken yori" ((二人静 -「天河伝説殺人事件」より; "Two People Still: From The Legendary Tenkawa Murder Case"))	T. Matsumoto	Makoto Sekiguchi	Akira Inoue	4:09
Total length:					60:59

Disc 2
No.	Title	Lyrics	Music	Arrangement	Length
1.	"Everlasting Love"	Taeko Onuki	Ryuichi Sakamoto	R. Sakamoto	4:50
2.	"Aibu" ((愛撫; "Caress"))	T. Matsumoto	Tetsuya Komuro	Komuro	5:14
3.	"Gekka" ((月華; "Moon Flower"))	Gorō Matsui	Shūgō Kajiwara	Akihiko Matsumoto	4:57
4.	"Genshi, Onna wa Taiyō Datta" ((原始、女は太陽だった; "Primitive, the Woman Was the Sun"))	Neko Oikawa	Masaki	Yasunori Iwasaki	4:47
5.	"Moonlight Shadow: Tsuki ni Hoero" ((MOONLIGHT SHADOW-月に吠えろ; "Moonlight Shadow -Howl at the Moon-"))	Toshihiko Takamizawa	Komuro	Komuro	5:07
6.	"Appetite"	Seriko Natsuno	U-ki	U-ki	5:15
7.	"Kisei (Never Forget) (2007 Version)" ((帰省 〜Never Forget〜; "Homecoming ~Never Forget~"))	Yasuhiro Suzu; Atsuko	Suzu	Akira Senju	5:33
8.	"The Heat (Musica Fiesta)"	Adya	Uru	Uru	4:54
9.	"Days"	Nakamori	Tetsurō Oda	Satoshi Takebe	4:57
10.	"Rakka Ryūsui" ((落花流水; "Falling Flower Running Water"))	T. Matsumoto	Kenji Hayashida	Masayuki Sakamoto	4:43
11.	"Hana yo Odore" ((花よ踊れ; "Dance with Flowers"))	Karen	Hitoshi Haba	Hiroshi Uesugi	4:18
12.	"Diva"	Ryohei Matsufuji	Philippe-Marc Anquetil; Chris Lee-Joe; Emma Rohan		3:21
13.	"Crazy Love"	Kōzō Endō; Miran Miran	Fredrik Bostrom; Anna Nordell; Calle Kindbom		3:31
14.	"I Hope So"	Nakamori	Shinjirō Inoue; Takebe	Takebe	4:43
15.	"Sweet Rain"	Matsufuji	Kei Kawano	Kawano	5:08
Total length:					71:11

First Press Edition DVD
No.	Title	Lyrics	Music	Length
1.	"Hikari no Nai Mangekyō" ((光のない万華鏡; "A Kaleidoscope Without Light"))	Nakamori	Makoto Sekiguchi
2.	"Eien no Tobira" ((永遠の扉; "Door to Eternity"))	Natsuno	Tamaki
3.	"Necessary"	Natsuno	Yoshiaki Ōuchi
4.	"Mizu ni Sashita Hana" ((水に挿した花; "Flowers in Water"))	Natsuko Tadano	Junko Hirotani
5.	"Ame no Hi wa Ningyo" ((雨の日は人魚; "Mermaid on a Rainy Day"))	Natsuno	Hiroyuki Matsuda
6.	"Ophelia" (Oferia (オフェリア))	Aki Shimogō	Satoshi Shimano
7.	"Gekka"	Matsui	Kajiwara
8.	"Al-Mauj"	Akira Ōtsu	Takashi Satō
9.	"Genshi, Onna wa Taiyō Datta"	Oikawa	Masaki
10.	"Ranka" ((乱火; "Raging Fire"))	Ōtsu	Suzuki

Special Edition DVD
No.	Title	Lyrics	Music	Length
1.	"Hikari no Nai Mangekyō"	Nakamori	Sekiguchi
2.	"Eien no Tobira"	Natsuno	Tamaki
3.	"Yokan" ((予感; "Premonition"))	Ryō Asuka	Asuka
4.	"Necessary"	Natsuno	Ōuchi
5.	"Mizu ni Sashita Hana"	Tadano	Hirotani
6.	"Arifureta Fūkei" ((ありふれた風景; "Ordinary Landscape"))	Akiko Kosaka	Kosaka
7.	"Ame no Hi wa Ningyo"	Natsuno	Matsuda
8.	"Ame ga Futteta..." ((雨が降ってた…; "It Was Raining"))	Yūho Iwasato	Chika Ueda
9.	"Catastrophe no Amagasa" (Katasutorofi no Amagasa (カタストロフィの雨傘; "Umbrella of Catastrophe"))	Mayumi Shinozuka	Tsunehiro Izumi
10.	"Ophelia"	Shimogō	Shimano
11.	"Gekka"	Matsui	Kajiwara
12.	"Futari Shizuka: Tenkawa Densetsu Satsujin Jiken yori"	T. Matsumoto	Sekiguchi
13.	"Al-Mauj"	Ōtsu	Satō
14.	"Genshi, Onna wa Taiyō Datta"	Oikawa	Masaki
15.	"Arashi no Naka de" ((嵐の中で; "In the Storm"))	Natsuno	Origa
16.	"Meu amor é..."	Kan	Matsuoka
17.	"Ranka"	Ōtsu	Suzuki
18.	"Kagerō" ((陽炎; "Heat Haze"))	Nakamori	Tamaki

== Charts ==
Weekly charts

Chart (2014)	Peak position
Japanese Albums (Oricon)	3

Year-end charts

Chart (2014)	Peak position
Japanese Albums (Oricon)	46

== Certification ==
Region	Certification	Certified units/sales
Japan (RIAJ)	Gold	100,000^{^}
^{^} Shipments figures based on certification alone.
