= Utahime Best 25th Anniversary Selection =

Compilation album by Akina Nakamori
- Released: January 17, 2007
- Recorded: 1994–2005
- Studio: Avaco Creative Studio; Sound Inn Studio
- Genre: J-pop; kayōkyoku
- Length: 70:49
- Language: Japanese
- Label: Utahime Records; Universal Sigma
- Producer: Akina Nakamori

Akina Nakamori chronology
Destination (2006)	Utahime Best 25th Anniversary Selection (2007)	Ballad Best 25th Anniversary Selection (2007)

Utahime Best 25th Anniversary Selection (歌姫ベスト 〜25th Anniversary Selection〜, Utahime Besuto ~ 25 Shūnenkinen Serekushon) is a compilation album by Japanese entertainer Akina Nakamori, released through Utahime Records and Universal Sigma on January 17, 2007, as a second compilation album to commemorate Nakamori's 25th anniversary. It was released on the same day as her twelfth video album "Live Tour 2006 The Last Destination".

== Background ==
The album consists of the live version of the song "Riverside Hotel by" Yousui Inoue, previously unreleased cover songs "China Town" by Eikichi Yazawa , Ii Tabidachi by Momoe Yamaguchi and selected cover tracks from MRA and UMJ era recorded between 1994 and 2005. The album was released in 2 editions: regular with solo CD and limited CD+DVD. DVD contains footage of recordings session of the Zero Album Utahime cover album and special interview.

By Nakamori's own wish, she wanted to wear disco wig on her album cover.

== Chart performance ==
The album peaked at No. 9 on Oricon's weekly albums chart and charted for eight weeks. It sold over 43,000 copies.

== Track listing ==
No.	Title	Original Performer	Length
1.	"Riverside Hotel" (リバーサイドホテル)	Yousui Inoue	4:24
2.	"Dance wa Umaku Odorenai" (ダンスはうまく踊れない)	Inoue	4:45
3.	"Mahou no Kagami" (魔法の鏡)	Yumi Arai	4:01
4.	"China Town" (チャイナタウン)	Eikichi Yazawa	3:40
5.	"Tagogare no Begin" (黄昏のビギン)	Naomi Chiaki	4:03
6.	"Shikisai no Blues" (色彩のブルース)	Ego-Wrappin'	4:55
7.	"Momoiro Toiki" (桃色吐息)	Mariko Takahashi	3:42
8.	"Ai wa Kagerou" (愛はかげろう)	Gamu	4:02
9.	"Koi no Yokan" (恋の予感)	Anzen Chitai	4:40
10.	"Mado" (窓)	Chiharu Matsuyama	4:50
11.	"Kasa ga nai" (傘がない)	Inoue	6:22
12.	"Cosmos" (秋桜)	Momoe Yamaguchi	3:53
13.	"Wakare no Yokan" (別れの予感)	Teresa Teng	4:31
14.	"Ihoujin" (異邦人)	Saki Kubota	3:29
15.	"Ruriiro no Chikyuu" (瑠璃色の地球)	Seiko Matsuda	4:20
16.	"Ii Tabidachi" (いい日旅立ち)	Yamaguchi	4:20
Total length:			70:49

== Charts ==
Chart (2007)	Peak position
Japanese Albums (Oricon)	9
