= Utahime 3: Shūmaku =

Studio album by Akina Nakamori
- Released: 3 December 2003
- Recorded: 2003
- Studio: Avaco Creative Studio; Victor Studio
- Genre: Kayōkyoku, J-pop
- Length: 55:50
- Language: Japanese
- Label: Universal Music Japan
- Producer: Akina Nakamori

Akina Nakamori chronology
I Hope So (2003)	Utahime 3: Shūmaku (2003)	Best Finger 25th Anniversary Selection (2006)

Utahime 3: Shūmaku (Finale) (歌姫3 〜終幕) is a covers album by Japanese singer-producer Akina Nakamori. It was released on 3 December 2003 under the Universal Music Japan sub-label KittyMe. It is Nakamori's third and final covers album from the Utahime cover album series. The cover choice consist of the songs released between 1960s and 1990s.

The album was released in 2-disc, second disc includes instrumental version of the songs arranged by Akira Senju.

In 2004 was released CD-Box Utahime Complex Box Empress which includes all Utahime albums, in 2007 released compilation album Utahime Best: 25th Anniversary Selection. In 2014, some of the songs from Utahime3: Shuumaku were included in the compilation album All Time Best: Utahime Cover.

== Stage performances ==
In 2005, Nakamori performed Odoriko, Kasa ga nai and Mado in special live Special Live 2005 Empress at CLUB eX. In 2009, Nakamori performed Koi no Yokan in the NHK music documentary SONGS.

== Chart performance ==
Utahime 3: Shūmaku debuted at number 25 on the Oricon Album weekly chart and sold over 31,700 copies.

== Track listing ==
No.	Title	Original Performer	Length
1.	"Utahime Opening 3"	Akira Senju	1:16
2.	"Kasa ga nai (傘がない)"	Inoue Yousui	6:22
3.	"Odoriko (踊り子)"	Kōzō Murashita	4:41
4.	"Ai wa Kagerou (愛はかげろう)"	Gamu	4:02
5.	"Slow-na Bugi ni shitekure I want you (スローなブギにしてくれ)"	Yoshitaka Minami	3:18
6.	"Yogiri yo Konya mo Arigatou (夜霧よ今夜もありがとう)"	Yūjirō Ishihara	3:43
7.	"Tokyo Sabaku (夜霧よ今夜もありがとう)"	Hiroshi Uchiyamada and Cool Five	4:23
8.	"Mado (窓)"	Chiharu Matsuyama	4:50
9.	"Manish: Utahime 3 interlude"	Senju	0:36
10.	"Alone"	B'z	6:33
11.	"Hollywood Scandal (ハリウッド・スキャンダル)"	Hiromi Go	4:06
12.	"Koi no Yokan (恋の予感)"	Anzen Chitai	4:40
13.	"No More Encore"	Ryudo Uzaki	5:18
14.	"Utahime 3 Ending"	Senju	1:40

== Release history ==
Year	Format(s)	Serial number	Label(s)	Ref.
2003	CD	UMCK-1174	UMJ	
2017	UHQCD	UPCH-7273	UMJ	
2023	CD	UPCY-7872	UMJ	
2024	LP	UPJY-9377	UMJ	
