= Enka (album) =

Studio album by Akina Nakamori
- Released: 27 June 2007
- Recorded: 2007
- Studios: 517 Studio; Sound City; Victor Studio; Warner Music Recording Studio; West Side; Zak Studio
- Genre: Enka
- Length: 55:50
- Language: Japanese
- Label: Universal Music Japan
- Producer: Akina Nakamori

Akina Nakamori chronology
Ballad Best 25th Anniversary Selection (2007)	Enka (2007)	Folk Song: Utahime Jojouka (2008)

Enka (艶華 -Enka-) is the enka covers album by Japanese singer-producer Akina Nakamori. It was released on 27 June 2007 under Universal Music Japan. It is Nakamori's fourth covers album.

== Background ==
The album was released in three editions: a cassette tape with A and B side, a limited edition "A", and a limited edition "B". Edition A includes a DVD disc with film footage of "Enka" and music video clips from the years 2002–2007. Edition B includes bonus track in disc 1 with a cover by Teresa Teng and disc 2 includes instrumental versions of the songs arranged by Akira Senju. The track-list was decided by the results of the inquiry, which fans could vote for on Nakamori's official website.

In 2014, some of the songs from Enka were included in the compilation album All Time Best: Utahime Cover.

== Chart performance ==
Enka debuted at number 10 on the Oricon Album weekly chart, charted for 12 weeks and sold over 61,400 copies.

The album has received golden disc from RIAJ and special reward in the 49th Japan Record Awards.

== Track listing ==
No.	Title	Original Performer	Length
1.	"Enka"	Akira Senju	1:28
2.	"Amagi-goe"	Sayuri Ishikawa	4:43
3.	"Mugonzaka"	Kaori Kozai	4:29
4.	"Hisame"	Mika Hino	3:49
5.	"Michizure"	Mieko Makimura	3:54
6.	"Ettou Tsubame"	Masako Mori	4:00
7.	"Enka II"	Senju	1:34
8.	"Kanashii Sake"	Hibari Misora	4:50
9.	"Funa Uta"	Aki Yashiro	3:58
10.	"Ishikari Banka"	Mirei Kitahara	4:03
11.	"Yagiri no Watashi"	Naomi Chiaki	3:36
12.	"Yozakura Oshichi"	Fuyumi Sakamoto	5:36
13.	"Enka III"	Senju	1:55

=== First-press edition "B" ===
No.	Title	Original Performer	Length
14.	"Kuukou"	Teresa Teng	4:47

== Release history ==
Year	Format(s)	Serial number	Label(s)	Ref.
2007	CD, CD+DVD, CT, 2CD	UMTK-1001, UMCK-1227, UMCK-9181, UMCK-9182/3	UMJ	
2017	UHQCD	UPCH-7278	UMJ	
2023	CD	UPCY-7873	UMJ	
2024	LP	UPJY-9378	UMJ	
