= Days (Akina Nakamori song) =

Single by Akina Nakamori

from the album I Hope So
- Language: Japanese
- B-side: "Hana"
- Released: April 30, 2003
- Recorded: 2002
- Studio: On Air Azabu Studio; 517 Studio; Westside Studio; Burnish Stone Recording Studio
- Genre: J-pop
- Length: 5:00
- Label: Universal J
- Composer: Tetsurō Oda
- Lyricist: Akina Nakamori
- Producer: Satoshi Takebe

Akina Nakamori singles chronology
"The Heat (Musica Fiesta)" (2002)	"Days" (2003)	"Akai Hana" (2004)

"Days" (デイズ, Deizu) is the 42nd single by Japanese entertainer Akina Nakamori. Written by Nakamori and Tetsurō Oda, the single was released on April 30, 2003, by Universal Music Japan. It was also the lead single from her 21st studio album I Hope So.

== Background ==
"Days" was the first single written by Nakamori since her 1995 release "Tokyo Rose". It was used as the ending theme of the TV Tokyo drama series Onna to Ai to Mystery (女と愛とミステリー, Onna to Ai to Misuterī; lit. Women, Love, and Mystery).

The B-side is "Hana", which was used as the theme song of the NHK series Chikyū Walker (地球ウォーカー, Chikyū Uōkā; lit. Earth Walker).

The single includes the bonus track "Ruriiro no Chikyū" (瑠璃色の地球; lit. "Azure Earth"), originally recorded by Seiko Matsuda in 1986. The song is included in Nakamori's cover album Zero Album: Utahime 2.

== Chart performance ==
"Days" peaked at No. 30 on Oricon's weekly singles chart and sold over 10,100 copies.

== Track listing ==
Original release
No.	Title	Lyrics	Music	Arrangement	Length
1.	"Days"	Akina Nakamori	Tetsurō Oda	Satoshi Takebe	5:00
2.	"Hana" ((華 -HANA-; "Flower"))	Seriko Natsuno	Hidekazu Uchiike	Yūji Toriyama	4:50
3.	"Ruriiro no Chikyū (Bonus Track)" ((瑠璃色の地球; "Azure Earth"))	Takashi Matsumoto	Shinji Kawahara	Akira Senju	4:24
4.	"Days" (Instrumental)				5:01
5.	"Hana" (Instrumental)				4:45
Total length:					24:00

== Charts ==
Chart (2003)	Peak position
Japan (Oricon)	30
