= Zero Album: Utahime 2 =

Studio album by Akina Nakamori
- Released: 20 March 2002
- Recorded: 2002
- Studio: Universal Recording Studio; On-Air Mafu Studio
- Genre: Kayōkyoku
- Length: 45:23
- Language: Japanese
- Label: Universal Music Japan
- Producer: Akina Nakamori

Akina Nakamori chronology
Will (1999)	Zero Album: Utahime 2 (2002)	Resonancia (2002)

Zero Album: Utahime 2 (歌姫2) is a covers album by Japanese singer-producer Akina Nakamori. It was released on 20 March 2002 under the Universal Music Japan sub-label KittyMe. It is Nakamori's second covers album from the Utahime cover album series.

It was also the first album to be released under her newly signed recording label, Universal Japan Music. Instead of debuting with a new original album, Nakamori chose her new start with this covers album and put in the beginning of the title "Zero".

The album was released as a 2-disc; the second disc includes instrumental versions of the songs arranged by Akira Senju.

On 30 April 2003, the cover song "Ruriiro Chikyuu" was included together with the single "Days". It was promoted as an image commercial song to the mobile company au.

== Stage performance ==
In April 2002, Nakamori performed "Ruriiro no Chikyuu" and "Cosmos" in the Fuji TV music television program Music Fair 21. In the live tour Resonancia in 2002, Nakamori performed on encore the same cover songs.

== Chart performance ==
Zero Album: Utahime 2 debuted at number 10 on the Oricon Album weekly chart and charted for 15 weeks and sold over 229,700 copies. It was her first album in seven years to debut on the top 10 charts.

== Track listing ==
No.	Title	Original Performer	Length
1.	"Utahime Opening 2"	Akira Senju	0:43
2.	"Tasogare no Begin (黄昏のビギン)"	Naomi Chiaki	4:03
3.	"Momoiro Toiki (桃色吐息)"	Mariko Takahashi	3:42
4.	"Adieu (アデュー)"	Mayo Shouno	4:02
5.	"Wakare no Yokan (別れの予感)"	Teresa Teng	4:31
6.	"Single Again (シングル・アゲイン)"	Mariya Takeuchi	4:03
7.	"Shikisai no Blues (色彩のブルース)"	Ego-Wrappin'	4:54
8.	"Cosmos (秋桜)"	Momoe Yamaguchi	3:53
9.	"Ihoujin (異邦人)"	Saki Kubota	3:29
10.	"Otome no Waltz (乙女のワルツ)"	Sakiko Ito	3:10
11.	"Ruriiro no Chikyuu (瑠璃色の地球)"	Seiko Matsuda	4:20
12.	"Utahime 2 Ending"	Senju	1:25

== Release history ==
Year	Format(s)	Serial number	Label(s)	Ref.
2002	CD	UMCK-1093	Kitty MME	
2017	UHQCD	UPCH-7264	Kitty MME	
2023	CD	UPCY-7870	Kitty MME	
2024	LP	UPJY-9374	Kitty MME	
