= Vamp (album) =

EP by Akina Nakamori
- Released: 18 December 1996
- Recorded: 1996
- Studio: Sound Valley; Victor Studio; Towerside Studio
- Genre: Electronic; funk; soul
- Length: 21:40
- Language: Japanese
- Label: MCA Victor
- Producer: Akina Nakamori

Akina Nakamori chronology
True Album Akina 95 Best (1995)	Vamp (1996)	Shaker (1997)

Vamp is the fourth mini studio album by Japanese singer Akina Nakamori. It was released on 18 December 1996, by MCA Victor and produced by Nakamori.

== Background ==
Vamp is her only mini album which was released under MCA Records. The album consists of four new songs.

In 2008, all songs were recorded in the first press edition of compilation album of her works from the 1990s, Utahime Densetsu: 90's Best.

The concept of the album consist of cool and sexy vibrance through the dance music.

The music production team consist a music producers Hiroshi Yamada and Masanori Shimada, songwriters Gorō Matsui and Seriko Natsuno.

== Stage performances ==
Nakamori performed all four songs only once, on her first dinner show in Xmas Dinner Show 1996.

== Chart performance ==
The album debuted at number 30 on the Oricon Album Weekly Charts, remained in top 100 chart for 5 weeks and sold over 30,100 copies.

== Track listing ==
No.	Title	Lyrics	Music	Arranger(s)	Length
1.	"Pride and Joy"	Hiroshi Yamada	Hirofumi Asamoto	Asamoto	4:13
2.	"Egoist"	Kenn Kato	Ton; Shoji	Masanori Shimada	4:44
3.	"Crescent Fish"	Gorō Matsui	Chika Ueda	U-ki	4:51
4.	"Metropolitan Blue"	Seriko Natsuno	Masashi Chizawa	Itaru Sakota	7:54
