= Folk Song: Utahime Jojouka =

Studio album by Akina Nakamori
- Released: 24 December 2008
- Recorded: 2008
- Studios: West Side; On-Air Mafu Studio; Zak Studio; Heart Beat Recording Studio
- Genre: Folk
- Length: 42:24
- Language: Japanese
- Label: Universal Music Japan
- Producer: Yuuji Toriyama

Akina Nakamori chronology
| Enka (2007) | Folk Song: Utahime Jojouka (2008) | Mood Kayō: Utahime Shōwa Meikyoku Shū (2009) |

Folk Song: Utahime Jojouka (フォーク・ソング〜歌姫抒情歌) is a covers album by Japanese singer Akina Nakamori. It was released on 24 December 2008 under Universal Music Japan. It is Nakamori's fifth covers album.

== Background ==
Unlike previous cover albums, this album was produced by Yuuji Toriyama. The album was released in the six editions with different cover jackets inspired by Andrew Warhol's piece Marilyn Diptych (1962), which portrays Marilyn Monroe (aside from the regular edition). The limited edition "A" includes DVD disc with recording footage of the album.

The album consist of folk songs that were released in Japan during the 1970s.

== Stage performances ==
In 2009, Nakamori performed "Watashi wa Naiteimasu", "Muenzaka", "22Sai no Wakare", "Ame no Monogatari" and "Koi" on Akina Nakamori Special Live 2009: "Empress at Yokohama". The DVD footage was released on 8 August 2010.

== Chart performance ==
Folk Song: Utahime Jojouka debuted at number 30 on the Oricon Album weekly chart, charted for 7 weeks and sold over 18,000 copies.

== Track listing ==
| No. | Title | Original Performer | Length |
|---|---|---|---|
| 1. | "Watashi wa Naiteimasu (わたしは泣いています)" | Lily | 1:28 |
| 2. | "Ichigohakusho Mou Ichido (『いちご白書』をもう一度)" | Ban Ban | 4:43 |
| 3. | "Ame no Monogatari (雨の物語)" | Iruka | 4:29 |
| 4. | "Sayonara wo suru tameni (さよならをするために)" | Billy BanBan | 3:49 |
| 5. | "Omoide Makura (想い出まくら)" | Kyoko Kosaka | 3:54 |
| 6. | "22sai no Owakare (22才の別れ)" | Kaze | 4:00 |
| 7. | "Fuyu ga Kuru Mae ni (冬が来る前に)" | Kami Fuusen | 1:34 |
| 8. | "Muenzaka (無縁坂)" | Group | 4:50 |
| 9. | "Toki ni wa Haha no nai Ko no you ni (時には母のない子のように)" | Carmen Maki | 3:58 |
| 10. | "Wakatte Kudasai (わかって下さい)" | Akira Inaba | 4:03 |
| 11. | "Koi (恋)" | Chiharu Matsuyama | 3:36 |

== Release history ==
| Year | Format(s) | Serial number | Label(s) | Ref. |
|---|---|---|---|---|
| 2008 | CD, CD+DVD | UMCK-1291, UMCK-9256, UMCK-9257, UMCK-9258, UMCK-9259 | UMJ | |
| 2017 | UHQCD | UPCH-7280 | UMJ | |
| 2023 | CD | UPCY-7873 | UMJ | |
| 2024 | LP | UPJY-9373 | UMJ | |
