= Crazy Love (Akina Nakamori song) =

Single by Akina Nakamori

from the album All Time Best: Original
- Language: Japanese
- Released: July 13, 2010
- Recorded: 2010
- Genre: J-pop; dance-pop
- Length: 3:30
- Label: Universal Sigma
- Composers: Fredrik Bostrom; Anna Nordell; Calle Kindbom
- Lyricists: Kōzō Endō; Miran:Miran
- Producer: BNA Productions for Caped Crusader Management

Akina Nakamori singles chronology
"Diva Single Version" (2009)	"Crazy Love" (2010)	"Rojo (Tierra)" (2015)

"Crazy Love" (クレイジー・ラブ, Kureijī Rabu) is the 48th single by Japanese entertainer Akina Nakamori. Written by Kōzō Endō, Nakamori (under the pseudonym "Miran:Miran"), Fredrik Bostrom, Anna Nordell, and Calle Kindbom, the single was released on July 13, 2010, by Universal Sigma. It was also the lead single from her compilation album All Time Best: Original. "Crazy Love" is an original song for the 2010 pachinko machine CR Nakamori Akina: Utahime Densetsu ~Koi Moni Dome nara~ (CR中森明菜・歌姫伝説〜恋も二度目なら〜; CR Akina Nakamori: Utahime Legend ~If Love Is For the Second Time~), and it was released exclusively as a digital download. As such, it did not appear on Oricon's weekly singles chart.

== Track listing ==
Digital release
No.	Title	Lyrics	Music	Length
1.	"Crazy Love"	Kōzō Endō; Miran:Miran	Fredrik Bostrom; Anna Nordell; Calle Kindbom	3:30
Total length:				3:30
