= La Alteración =

1995 studio album by Akina Nakamori

Studio album by Akina Nakamori
- Released: 21 July 1995; 4 December 2002 (as La Alteración+4)
- Recorded: 1994–1995
- Studio: Victor Studio; Music Inn; Cherry Island Studio
- Genre: Pop, rock, Latin
- Length: 45:53 (original); 62:06 (reissue)
- Language: Japanese
- Label: MCA Victor
- Producer: Akina Nakamori

Akina Nakamori chronology
| Utahime (1994) | La Alteración (1995) | True Album Akina 95 Best (1995) |

Singles from La Alteración
- 1. "Genshi, Onna wa Taiyō Datta" Released: 21 June 1995

La Alteración is the sixteenth studio album by Japanese singer-producer Akina Nakamori, And her second studio album to be released during the 1990s. It was released on 21 July 1995, by MCA Victor. The album includes the lead single "Genshi, Onna wa Taiyō Datta".

In 2002 was released re-printed version of the album La Alteración+4 which includes original version of Genshi, Onna wa Taiyou Datta, single Tokyo Rose and B-sides Kirei and Yasashii Kankei, which was previously unreleased in the album recordings.

== Promotion ==
=== Single ===
It consists of one previously released single.

"Genshi, Onna wa Taiyou Datta" is the thirty-third single written by Masaki and Neko Oikawa. It was released on 21 June 1995, it was the first single to be released in that year. It includes renewed arrangement with the double echoes, compared to the original. The original version was included re-printed version of album, La Alteración+4 and compilation albums True Akina 96 Best Album, Utahime Densetsu: 90's Best and All Time Best: Originals under the Universal Music label.

The single debuted at number 15 on the Oricon Single Weekly Charts.

== Stage performances ==
The album tracks "Tokyo Rose", "Gaia: Chikyuu no Sasayaki", "Tsurai Tsurai", "Shitataru Jounestsu", "Itai Koi wo Shita" and "Necessary" were performed on the special Nakamori Akina True Live tour in 1995.

"Genshi, Onna wa Taiyou Datta" special live Nakamori Akina True Live, in live tour Music Fiesta in 2002 and Last Destination in 2006.

== Chart performance ==
The album reached at number 7 on the Oricon Album Weekly Chart charted for the 8 consecutive weeks with the sales of 149,100 copies. It's Akina's last studio album which sold over 100,000 copies. During its re-release in 2023, it debuted at number 66 on the Billboard Japan's Album Weekly charts.

== Track listing ==
=== La Alteración ===
La Alteración track listing
| No. | Title | Lyrics | Music | Arranger(s) | Length |
|---|---|---|---|---|---|
| 1. | "Gaia: Chikyuu no Sasayaki (地球のささやき)" | Seriko Natsuno | Nittoku Inoue | Shouhei Narabe (ex.Kome Kome Club) | 3:52 |
| 2. | "Sunflower" | Natsumi Tadano | Kaoru Akimoto | Takuo Sugiyama | 5:38 |
| 3. | "Genshi, Onna wa Taiyō Datta (原始、女は太陽だった)" (album version) | Neko Oikawa | Masaki | Yasunori Iwasaki | 4:49 |
| 4. | "Tsurai Tsurai" | Nobuko Hokari | Abe Makoto | Iwasaki | 5:09 |
| 5. | "Shitataru Jounetsu (したたる情熱)" | Oikawa | Takayuki Hattori | Hattori | 6:15 |
| 6. | "Itai Koi wo Shita (痛い恋をした)" | Oikawa | Chika Ueda | Sugiyama | 5:23 |
| 7. | "Necessary" | Natsuno | Yoshiaki Oouchi | Hattori | 5:10 |
| 8. | "Muku (無垢)" | Mami Kakubo | Hitoshi Haba | Narabe | 4:35 |
| 9. | "Dakara Nannano (だからなんなの)" | Natsuno | Inoue | Narabe | 5:08 |

=== La Alteración+4 ===
La Alteración+4 track listing
| No. | Title | Lyrics | Music | Arranger(s) | Length |
|---|---|---|---|---|---|
| 10. | "Genshi, Onna wa Taiyo Datta [原始、女は太陽だった（シングルバージョン）]" | Neko Oikawa | Masaki | Yasunori Iwasaki | 5:36 |
| 11. | "Kirei (綺麗)" | Natsuno | Chiho Kiyooka | Iwasaki | 4:12 |
| 12. | "Tokyo Rose" | Akina Nakamori, Takashi Kamisawatsu | Masaki | Brian Setzer | 4:09 |
| 13. | "Yasashii Kankei (優しい関係)" | Natsuno | Setzer | Setzer | 5:18 |

== Release history ==
| Year | Format(s) | Serial number | Label(s) | Ref. |
|---|---|---|---|---|
| 1995 | CD | MVCD-25 | MCA | |
| 2002 | CD | UMCK-1152 | UMJ | |
| 2017 | UHQCD | UPCH-7270 | UMJ | |
| 2023 | LP, CD | UPCY-7837, UPJY-9339/40 | UMJ | |

Notes:

- Re-releases since 2002 always includes additional 4 tracks, which were not included during its the first release time
