= Diva (Akina Nakamori album) =

Studio album by Akina Nakamori
- Released: 26 August 2009
- Recorded: 2009
- Studios: West Side; Warner Music Recording; Studio At the Palms
- Genres: Electro, Rock
- Length: 38:09
- Language: Japanese
- Label: Universal Music Japan
- Producers: Bna Productions; Rodney Alejandro; Matthew Tishler; Jennifer Karr

Akina Nakamori chronology
Folk Song 2: Utahime Aishouka (2009)	Diva (2009)	All Time Best: Original (2014)

Singles from Diva
- 1. "Diva Single Version" Released: 23 September 2009

Diva (stylized as DIVA) is the twenty third studio album by Japanese singer Akina Nakamori and final studio album to be released during the 2000s. It was released on 26 August 2009 under the Universal Music Japan label. The album includes music producers from the United States.

The album includes Akina's original written songs "Heartbreak" (under her pseudonym Miran:Miran).

It's the Nakamori's first studio album to be released in both regular and limited editions. Limited edition also includes remixed versions of Diva and Heartache. The original version of Heartache is included only in the single Diva Single Version along with the re-release of I Hope So as a B-Side.

After the album release, Akina suspended her music activities from 2010 until 2014.

== Promotion ==
=== Singles ===
It consists of one previously released single.

"Diva Single Version" is the forty seventh single. It was released one month after the album release, on 23 September 2009 under Universal Music Japan. It was her only single to be released in that year and first single to be released in 3 years. The album version of the single was included in the compilation album All Time Best: Originals in 2014. The original version is unreleased as of 2020.

The single debuted at number 50 on Oricon Single Weekly Charts.

== Chart performance ==
The album reached number 29 on the Oricon Album Weekly Chart charted for the 3 consecutive weeks with the sales of 6,900 copies. During its re-release in 2023, the album debut at number 75 on the Billboard Japan's Album Weekly charts.

== Track listing ==
All tracks are arranged by Satoshi Takebe.

Diva track listing
No.	Title	Lyrics	Music	Arranger	Length
1.	"Give Take"	Ryohei Matsufuji	Philippe-Marc Anquetil, Chris Lee-Joe, Jasmine Denham		3:47
2.	"Diva"	Ryohei Matsufuji	Anquetil, Lee-Joe, Emma Rohan		3:21
3.	"Thinking of You"	Yutaka Shinya	Shinya	Shinya	4:13
4.	"Reverse"	Ryohei Matsufuji	Philip Hochstrate, Tom Howe, Denise Saneinia		3:40
5.	"Aenakute" (逢えなくて)	Matsufuji	Shinya	Shinya	5:03
6.	"X Lady"	Matsufuji	Roxanne Smith, Rick Smith, Anna-Maria La Spina		3:31
7.	"Heartbreak"	Matsufuji, Miran:Miran	Matthew Tishler, Deanna Dellacioppa, Rodney Alejandro, Jenny Karr		3:33
8.	"With"	Shinya	Shinya	Shinya	3:06
9.	"Akaneiro no Kaze" (茜色の風)	Shinya	Shinya	Shinya	4:17
10.	"Going Home"	ADYA	Shinya	Shinya	3:38
Total length:					38:09

== Release history ==
Year	Format(s)	Serial number	Label(s)	Ref.
2009	CD, 2DC	UMCK-1331, UMCK-9298/9	UMJ	
2017	UHQCD	UPCH-7283	UMJ	
2023	LP, CD	UPCY-7842, UPJY-9351	UMJ	
