= Diva Single Version =

Single by Akina Nakamori

from the album Diva
- Language: Japanese
- B-side: Heartache (Original Version); I Hope So
- Released: September 23, 2009
- Recorded: 2009
- Genre: J-pop; dance-pop
- Length: 4:24
- Label: Universal Sigma
- Composers: Philippe-Marc Anquetil; Chris Lee-Joe; Emma Rohan
- Lyricist: Ryohei Matsufuji

Akina Nakamori singles chronology
"Hana yo Odore" (2005)	"Diva Single Version" (2009)	"Crazy Love" (2010)

"Diva Single Version" is the 47th single by Japanese entertainer Akina Nakamori. Written by Ryohei Matsufuji, Philippe-Marc Anquetil, Chris Lee-Joe, and Emma Rohan, the single was released on September 23, 2009, by Universal Sigma. It was also the lead single from her 23rd studio album Diva.

== Background ==
"Diva Single Version" was Nakamori's first single in three years, after the 2005 release "Hana yo Odore". The first B-side "Heartbreak" is the original mix of the song included in the album Diva, while the second B-side "I Hope So" is a remastered version of the title track from Nakamori's 2003 album I Hope So.

== Chart performance ==
"Diva Single Version" peaked at No. 50 on Oricon's weekly singles chart and sold over 1,600 copies, becoming Nakamori's lowest-selling single.

== Track listing ==
Original release
No.	Title	Lyrics	Music	Arrangement	Length
1.	"Diva Single Version"	Ryohei Matsufuji	Philippe-Marc Anquetil; Chris Lee-Joe; Emma Rohan		4:24
2.	"Heartache" (Original Version)	Hiroshi Egawa; Miran:Miran	Mauthew Tishler; Deanna Dellacioppa; Rodney Alejandro; Jenny Karr		3:33
3.	"I Hope So"	Akina Nakamori	Shinjirō Inoue; Satoshi Takebe	Takebe	4:44
Total length:					12:41

== Personnel ==
"I Hope So"

- Hirokazu Ogura – electric guitar
- Yoshiaki Kanō – acoustic guitar
- Chiharu Mikuzuki – bass
- Toshiya Matsunaga – drums
- Satoshi Takebe – keyboards
- Masafumi Yamanaka – synthesizers, programming

== Charts ==
Chart (2009)	Peak position
Japan (Oricon)	50
