= Belie =

2016 studio album by Akina Nakamori

Studio album by Akina Nakamori
- Released: 30 November 2016
- Recorded: United States, 2016
- Genre: J-pop
- Length: 46:59 (Belie); 70:25 (Belie+Vampire)
- Language: Japanese
- Label: Universal Music Japan
- Producer: Naoshi Fujikura; Don Flamingo

Akina Nakamori chronology
Fixer (2015)	Belie (2016)	Vampire (2017)

Belie is a covers album by Japanese singer Akina Nakamori. It was released on 30 November 2016 under Universal Music Japan.

== Release history ==
The CD was released in three editions: the regular CD edition, the first-press CD/DVD edition which includes full music videoclips for all 10 cover songs, and a limited edition vinyl, Belie+Vampire released one month later. The Vampire EP, which also includes cover songs, was at first only meant to be sold in limited copies, however in 2017, the year of her 35th debut anniversary celebration, the Vampire EP was released separately on 3 May.

== Chart performance ==
Belie debuted at number 8 on the Oricon Album weekly chart and charted for 9 weeks and sold over 22,800 copies. On the monthly charts, it remained at number 27. On digital streaming service Recochoku's charts, the album debuted at number 5 on its Digital Album Daily Chart.

== Track listing ==
=== Belie ===
No.	Title	Original Performer	Length
1.	"Saudade"	Porno Graffitti	4:16
2.	"Yasashiku Naritai"	Kazuyoshi Saito	4:52
3.	"WHITE BREATH"	T.M.Revolution	4:27
4.	"A Cruel Angel's Thesis"	Yoko Takahashi	4:03
5.	"Genkai Lovers"	Show-Ya	4:08
6.	"Shanikusai"	Momoe Yamaguchi	4:48
7.	"Sutekina Koi no Wasurekata"	Hiroko Yakushimaru	5:19
8.	"Mou Hitotsu no Doyoubi"	Shōgo Hamada	5:33
9.	"One More Time, One More Chance"	Masayoshi Yamazaki	5:27
10.	"Tashikana Koto"	Kazumasa Oda	3:16

== Release history ==
=== Bellie ===
Year	Format(s)	Serial number	Label(s)	Ref.
2016	CD, CD+DVD	UPCH-2104, UPCH-7208	UMJ	
2023	CD	UPCY-7877	UMJ	
2024	LP	UPJY-9383	UMJ	

=== Belie+Vampire ===
Year	Format(s)	Serial number	Label(s)	Ref.
2017	UHQCD+LP	UPCH-7207	UMJ	
