= Nanohana =

Species of plant

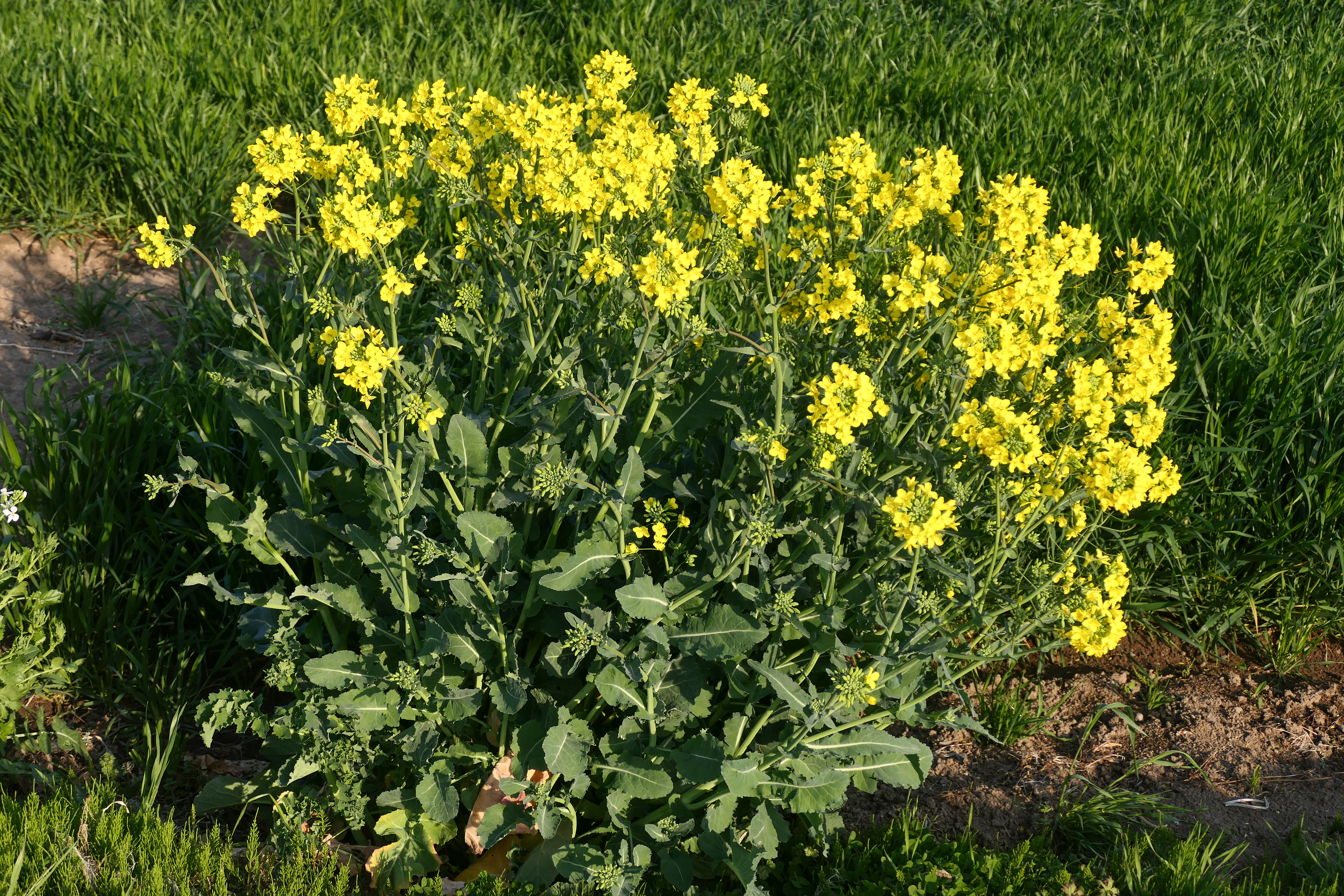
Nanohana flowers in Saitama Prefecture (Brassica napus)

Nanohana (菜の花) is a Japanese generic name for flowers of the Brassicaceae family. The related term, nabana (菜花; 'vegetable flower'), refers to the flowers and leaf stalks of turnip, napa cabbage, cabbage, brown mustard, zha cai, and broccoli, belonging to the Brassicaceae family, commonly used in Japanese cuisine. A type of nabana, the rapeseed plant (Brassica napus), is used to produce rapeseed oil (nataneyu). Nabana is also used for decoration.

== In cuisine ==
Nabana
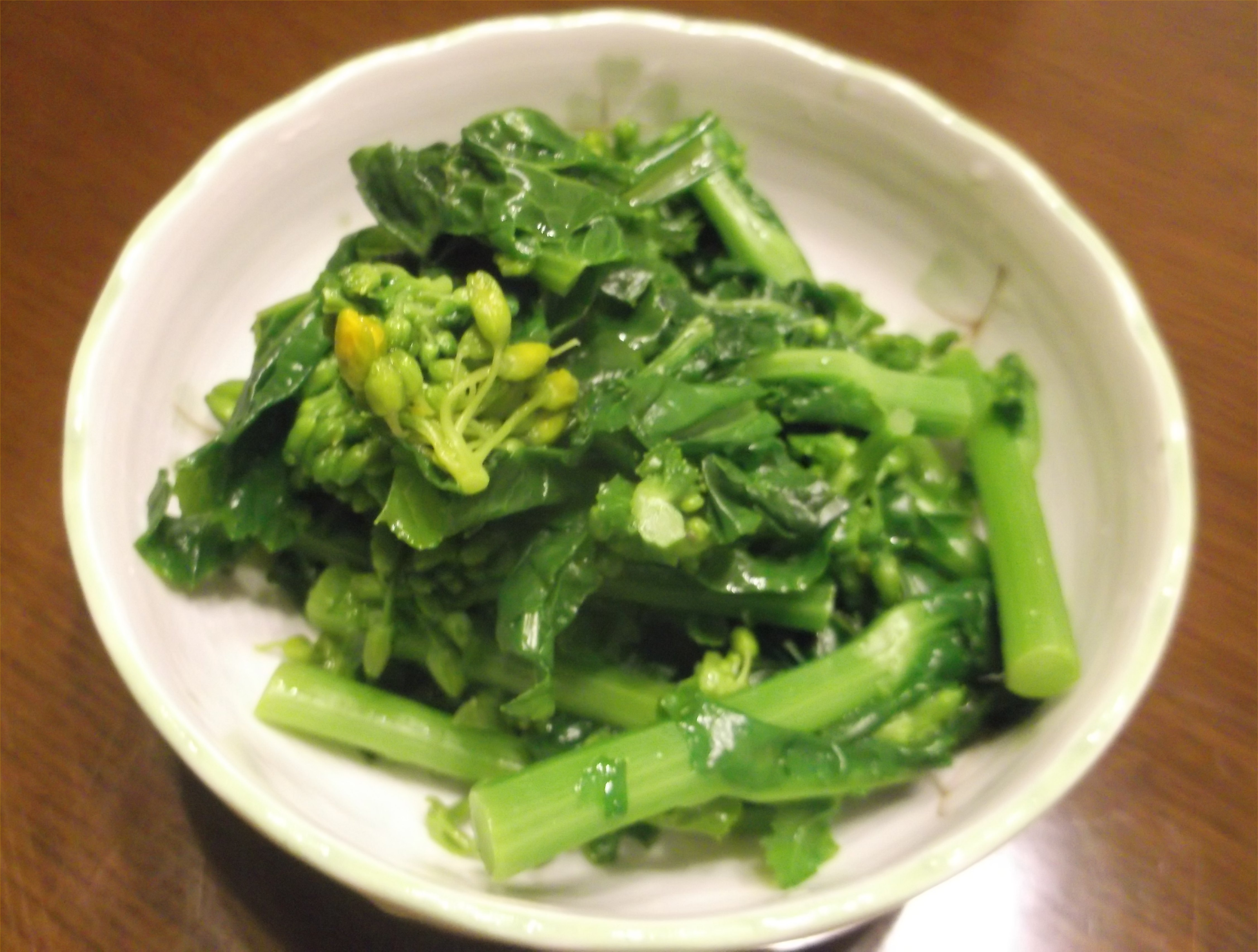
- Ohitashi (boiled rapeseed blossom)
- Species: Brassica napus

The florets, stems, and leaves are all edible, and are commonly boiled and served with dashi (stock) and katsuobushi (bonito flakes). The shoots may also be pickled or served as a salad with mustard.

== In culture ==
A festival celebrating the spring bloom of nanohana, called Nanohana Matsuri, is held annually in Japan.
