= Gekka =

Single by Akina Nakamori
- Language: Japanese
- English title: Moon Flower
- B-side: "Blue Lace"
- Released: October 5, 1994
- Recorded: 1994
- Genre: J-pop
- Length: 5:02
- Label: MCA Victor
- Composer: Shūgō Kajiwara
- Lyricist: Gorō Matsui

Akina Nakamori singles chronology
"Yoru no Doko ka de (Night Shift)" (1994)	"Gekka" (1994)	"Genshi, Onna wa Taiyō Datta" (1995)

"Gekka" (月華; lit. "Moon Flower") is the 30th single by Japanese entertainer Akina Nakamori. Written by Gorō Matsui and Shūgō Kajiwara, the single was released on October 5, 1994, by MCA Victor.

== Background ==
"Gekka" was initially recorded by composer Kajiwara and released as a single on September 21, 1994, two weeks before Nakamori's version was released. Nakamori's version was used as an image song for Miki Corporation's "Boutique Joy" commercials.

Nakamori has re-recorded "Gekka" for the 1995 compilation True Album Akina 95 Best.

== Chart performance ==
"Gekka" peaked at No. 8 on Oricon's weekly singles chart and sold over 137,400 copies. It was also certified Gold by the RIAJ.

== Track listing ==
Original release
No.	Title	Lyrics	Music	Arrangement	Length
1.	"Gekka" ((月華; "Moon Flower"))	Gorō Matsui	Shūgō Kajiwara	Akihiko Matsumoto	5:02
2.	"Blue Lace"	Megumi Ayukawa	Akemi Kakihara	Etsuko Yamakawa	4:45
3.	"Gekka" (Original Karaoke)				5:01
4.	"Blue Lace" (Original Karaoke)				4:45
Total length:					19:33

== Charts ==
Chart (1994)	Peak position
Japan (Oricon)	8

== Certification ==
Region	Certification	Certified units/sales
Japan (RIAJ)	Gold	200,000^{^}
^{^} Shipments figures based on certification alone.

== Cover versions ==
- Shūgō Kajiwara, original composer of the songs self-cover the song and released it as a single "Gekka" in 1994.
