= Folk Song 2: Utahime Aishouka =

Studio album by Akina Nakamori
- Released: 29 July 2009
- Recorded: 2009
- Studio: Studio at the Palms; 517 Studio
- Genre: Folk
- Length: 39:29
- Language: Japanese
- Label: Universal Music Japan
- Producer: Yuuji Toriyama

Akina Nakamori chronology
Mood Kayō: Utahime Shōwa Meikyoku Shū (2009)	Folk Song 2: Utahime Aishouka (2009)	Diva (2009)

Folk Song 2: Utahime Aishouka (フォーク・ソング2 〜歌姫哀翔歌) is a covers album by Japanese singer Akina Nakamori. Although the original release was scheduled on 22 July, it was postponed by one week and released on 29 July 2009 under Universal Music Japan. It is Nakamori's seventh covers album.

Yuuji Toriyama reprised his role as a main producer and sound producer of the album. The album was released in limited and regular editions. The limited edition includes a DVD disc with recording footage of the album. The album consists of folk songs that were released in Japan during the 1970s.

== Stage performances ==
In 2009, Nakamori performed "Gakuseigai no Kissaten", "Tabi no Yado", "Kokoro Moyou", "Shikuramen no Hakori", "Akujo", "I Love You" and "Velvet Easter" on Akina Nakamori Special Live 2009: "Empress at Yokohama". The DVD footage was released on 8 August 2010.

== Chart performance ==
Folk Song: Utahime Jojouka debuted at number 33 on the Oricon Album weekly chart, charted for 6 weeks and sold over 8,100 copies.

== Track listing ==
No.	Title	Original Performer	Length
1.	"Tabi no Yado (旅の宿)"	Takuro Yoshida	3:24
2.	"Nagori Yuki (なごり雪)"	Iruka	3:37
3.	"Kokoro Moyou (心もよう)"	Inoue Yousui	3:53
4.	"Velvet Easter (ベルベット・イースター)"	Arai Yumi	3:50
5.	"Shourou Nagashi (精霊流し)"	Grape	4:58
6.	"Akujo (悪女)"	Miyuki Nakajima	4:03
7.	"Shikuramen no Kahori (シクラメンのかほり)"	Akira Fuse	4:23
8.	"Kandagawa (神田川)"	Kaguyahime	3:21
9.	"Gakuseigai no Kissaten (学生街の喫茶店)"	Garo	3:43
10.	"I Love You"	Yutaka Ozaki	4:17

== Release history ==
Year	Format(s)	Serial number	Label(s)	Ref.
2009	CD, CD+DVD	UMCK-1317, UMCK-9286	UMJ	
2017	UHQCD	UPCH-7282	UMJ	
2023	CD	UPCY-7875	UMJ	
2024	LP	UPJY-9380	UMJ	
