= Akina Nakamori =

Japanese singer and actress (born 1965)

Akina Nakamori 中森明菜
- Born: 13 July 1965 (age 61); Ōta, Tokyo, Japan
- Genres: J-pop; kayōkyoku
- Occupations: Singer; actress; producer
- Years active: 1982–present
- Label: Warner Pioneer (1982–1991) (2024–present); MCA Victor (1993–1997); This One/Gauss (1998–1999); @ease (music@nifty) (2001); Universal Sigma (2002–2023); Utahime Records (Note: Founded in 2004 as a sub-label of Universal Sigma, it is operating under Polydor Records until her leave in 2023.) (2004–2023)
- Website: akinanakamoriofficial.com

Akina Nakamori (中森 明菜, Nakamori Akina; born 13 July 1965) is a Japanese singer, songwriter, record producer and actress. She is one of the most popular and best-selling music artists in Japan. Akina achieved national recognition after winning the 1981 season of the talent show Star Tanjō!. Her debut single "Slow Motion" was released to moderate success, peaking at number thirty on the Oricon Weekly Singles Chart. Nakamori's popularity increased with the release of her follow-up single, "Shōjo A", which peaked at number five on the Oricon charts and sold over 390,000 copies. Her second album Variation became her first number-one on the Oricon Weekly Albums Chart, staying in that position for three weeks.

She made her acting debut in 1985 with an appearance in the Japanese romance movie Ai, Tabidachi . After an extended hiatus from 2010 to 2014, Akina released two compilation albums, All Time Best: Original and All Time Best: Utahime Cover, both of which were commercially successful.

== Early life ==
Nakamori was born on 13 July 1965, in Ōta, Tokyo, the fifth child and third daughter of six brothers and sisters. Her father Akio Nakamori worked as a butcher and owned a meat shop. Nakamori and her siblings were all named after their father, Akio, bearing the kanji 明 (aki) in their names. Her mother named her "Akina", which means "a bright nanohana flower". Her younger sister Akiho Nakamori was also an actress who died in 2019 at the age of 52. Shortly after her birth, the family moved to Kiyose, Tokyo, where she grew up.

Her mother, a fan of Hibari Misora, made her listen to Hibari's songs and taught her how to sing. Eventually, Nakamori began to dream of becoming a singer under the influence of her mother.

== Career ==
=== 1982–1984 ===
After Akina Nakamori won Star Tanjō! on her third attempt, she made her debut in 1982 with the single "Slow Motion." Recorded in Los Angeles, the single was released on 1 May 1982 and sold 174,000 copies, reaching No. 30 on the Oricon charts. The second single, "Shōjo A" was nearly banned for its risque lyrics. This single fared better and peaked at No. 5, selling 396,000 copies. Her next single, a ballad titled "Second Love" proved to be her best-selling single. It debuted at No. 2 but reached No. 1 the following week, staying at the top for nine weeks. It sold 766,000 copies then, and to date has sold almost one million. In addition to the single releases, Nakamori also released two albums titled Prologue and Variation that year, which sold 453,000 and 743,000 copies respectively.

The following year, Nakamori released three singles, two studio albums, and her first best-of album. The singles were "½ no Shinwa", which sold 573,000 copies and debuted at #1, making it her best-selling single of that year; "Twilight (Yūgure Dayori)", released in May, which sold 430,000 copies and debuted at #2; and "Kinku", her last single of that year, which debuted at #1 and sold 511,000 copies. All three albums, Fantasy, New Akina Etranger and Best Akina Memoires hit No. 1. Nakamori made the first of her seven official performances on the NHK Kōhaku Uta Gassen on 31 December 1983, the 34th edition of the show.

In 1984, Nakamori released "Kita Wing", which sold 614,000 copies and debuted at number 2 and remained at that position for 6 weeks. "Kita Wing" is also rumored to be Momoe Yamaguchi's favorite Nakamori Song. Yamaguchi is Nakamori's idol. Her next single "Southern Wind" brought her back to the number 1 spot, though it sold less than its predecessor at 544,000 copies. "Jukkai (1984)" proved to be another number 1 for her, selling 611,000 copies. The 9th single, "Kazari ja Nai no yo Namida wa" proved to be a turning point in Akina Nakamori's career as the song is considered difficult to sing with fast lyrics. It debuted at number 1 and sold 625,000 copies. Many in Japan cite this song and her 1986 single, "Desire (Jōnetsu)", as Nakamori's signature song. Her two album releases of that year, Anniversary and Possibility both fared well and hit No. 1.

=== 1985–1986 ===
Nakamori kicked off 1985 with "Meu amor é...," which debuted #1 with 631,000 copies sold ultimately and also winning Nakamori the Grand Prix award at the 27th Japan Record Awards. She became the youngest person at the time (20) to be given the award. Originally, the single was to be titled "Akaitori Nigeta" (The red bird flies away), but the producers felt that the lyrics were not Samba-ish enough. "Meu amor é..." was the result of the newly penned lyrics. "Akaitori Nigeta" was released as a 12-inch single instead, making the No.1 spot as well. It also contained the remixed b-side Babylon and sold 354,000 overall. She then released "Sand Beige (Sabaku e)" which sold 461,000 copies and debuted at number 1. Her next single, "Solitude" also debuted at number 1 and sold 336,000 copies.

She also released two albums in 1985. Firstly, Bitter and Sweet, which contained the album version of the earlier hit of "Kazari ja Nai no yo Namida wa" and "BABYLON." It sold 556,000 copies and debuted at number 1 again. Her next album, D404ME, only had a remix version of the hit single "Meu amor é..." among other new songs and sold 651,000 copies, debuting at number 1.

In 1986, Nakamori's first single of that year, "Desire (Jōnetsu)" marked a more mature style of singing and song choice. It was the theme song of the Pioneer Private commercial and was awarded the Grand Prix at the 28th Japan Record Awards in 1986. She became the youngest winner of two consecutive years. It sold 516,000 copies and debuted at number 1. Her next single "Gypsy Queen" was a calmer song than "Desire (Jōnetsu)" and sold 358,000 copies, debuting at number 1. The single "Fin" followed, and sold 318,000 copies, debuting at number 1.

To commemorate her first four years in the business, Nakamori released her first "BEST" album. It sold 766,000 copies and debuted at number 1. Nakamori then released Fushigi, a concept album with echoing singing and obscure musical arrangement. It was a shock for the mainly conservative Japanese public, and thus sold 464,000 copies, nearly 200,000 less than Crimson, an album composed in entirety by only women, which sold 601,000 copies. Both debuted at number 1, but Fushigi stayed at number 1 for only three weeks while Crimson topped the charts for four.

=== 1987–1989 ===
In 1987, she released "Tango Noir," which sold 348,000 copies and debuted at number 1. Even though sales of singles were declining, "Tango Noir" still became the second best-selling single in 1987. Her next single was "Blonde", a Japanese-language version of "The Look That Kills" from her English-language album Cross My Palm. It sold 301,000 copies and added to her No.1 singles. Her most critically acclaimed single of that year was a heartfelt ballad called "Nanpasen," an emotionally draining song that many people attributed to her rocky relationship with her then-boyfriend, Masahiko Kondō and the death of Kondō's mother. It sold 431,000 copies and debuted at number 1.

She released only one album in 1987, an unsuccessful English debut album titled Cross My Palm. Reasons for its lack of success include Nakamori's heavily accented English and lack of promotion in the U.S. Nonetheless, it was a hit in Japan, selling 343,000 copies and debuting at number 1.

On March 3, 1988, Nakamori released album Stock. Three singles were released in 1988, "Al-Mauj", "Tattoo" and "I Missed the Shock." The first two debuted at No. 1.

In 1989, Nakamori only released one single due to her mental health at the time. "Liar" became her 20th No. 1 single. The single was rumored to reflect her feelings about Kondō. It came as a shock to the public when news of her attempted suicide in Kondō's apartment broke in July 1989, after he called off their engagement. She was found and hospitalized. After her physical recovery, she retreated from the public eye for a while.

=== 1990–1997 ===
Her return to the music scene in 1990 was met with skepticism and curiosity, propelling the single "Dear Friend" to No. 1. Nakamori once claimed that Dear Friend is perhaps her only happy song. Nevertheless, she reverted to melancholic, jilted love songs that ultimately did not go well with the public's taste. Her next single "Mizu ni Sashita Hana" became her 21st Oricon #1 single, but she could not reach the top position again after that. In the autumn of 1990, she was slated to release a new studio album Gaze, which would include singles "Mizu ni Sashita Hana" and ten more songs written by writer Eikyo Kyo. Due to issues with the record label, soon after her two-day live concert Yume, Nakamori left Warner Pioneer until she returned in 2024 following with a new agency and the album remained unreleased.

In 1991 and 1992, Nakamori ventured into acting with varying success. Kome Kome Club's 1992 single Kimi ga Iru Dake de, which sold over 2.89 million copies, was the theme song of Japanese television drama Sugao no Mamade, in which she played a leading role.

In 1993, she transferred to the record company MCA Victor. On 21 May 1993, she released her 27th single "Everlasting Love", written and produced by Ryuichi Sakamoto. Two years had passed since the release of her previous single "Futari Shizuka: Tenkawa Densetsu Satsujin Jiken yori". According to the recording producer, Nakamori distanced herself from her casual style, and, along with her new music production staff, aimed more for a contemporary style with this release. The single debuted at number 10 on the Oricon Weekly Single charts and charted for 5 weeks.

On 24 March 1994, Nakamori had a double release for her 28th single: her first cover single "Kataomoi", originally performed by Mie Nakao, and her first cover album Utahime. The double A-side track "Aibu" was written by Tetsuya Komuro. This track is widely popular among fans, and Nakamori has performed it very often during live tours. Plans were made to release "Aibu" as a single, but it was decided that the start-up single would be "Everlasting Love." The single debuted at number 17 on the Oricon Weekly Single charts and charted for 8 weeks. The main producer of the cover album Utahime was Nakamori herself, and the main arranger was Akira Senju. The album debuted at number 5 on the Oricon Weekly Album Charts and charted for 9 weeks. In 2002, a re-mastered version of the album was released through Universal Music.

On 13 April 1994, Nakamori played a role as the first suspect on the TV Series Furuhata Ninzaburō in the episode titled "The Shoujo Manga Murderer".

On 2 September 1994, Nakamori released her 29th single "Yoru no Doko ka de (Night Shift)", written by Tsugutoshi Gotō. The single was promoted as the ending theme for Nippon Television Network System news program NNN Kyou Dekigoto and the B-side track Rose Bud was promoted as the ending theme for Fuji TV talk program Shingo to Shinsuke no Abunai Hanashi. The single debuted at number 14 on the Oricon Weekly Single Charts and charted for 7 weeks.

On 22 September 1993, Nakamori released her 15th studio album Unbalance+Balance. Four years had passed since the release of her previous studio album Cruise. The production of the album started in spring 1992 in the United States, before Nakamori moved to her new recording company. The album consists of two previously released singles' B-side tracks, "Not Crazy to Me" and "Aibu". Not Crazy to Me had a renewed arrangement. Two of the album tracks were written by Nakamori herself. The album tracks Eien no Tobira and Kagerou are melodically the same, however, they have completely different lyrics and themes. The idea was realized thanks to Nakamori's proposal to change the arrangement. The album debuted at number 4 on the Oricon Weekly Album Charts and charted for 9 weeks. In 2002, through Universal Music, Nakamori released a re-mastered album with the renewed title Unbalance+Balance +6. This version of the album included six more additional tracks, singles, and their b-side tracks released between 1993 and 1994.

On 5 October 1994, she released her 30th single "Gekka" written by Shuugou Kajiwara. The single was promoted as a commercial song for Miki Corporation's Boutique Joy. In this single Nakamori returned to a more traditional melody, similar to her previous single Futari Shizuka, albeit with a more dramatic melody and difficult vibrato. The single debuted at number 8 on the Oricon Weekly Single Charts and charted for 7 weeks.

Between 1 and 5 December 1994, she held a special live titled Utahime Parco Theatre Live in the Parco Theatre. It was her first live show in two years. The set-list consists of songs from two previously released albums, Utahime and Unbalance+Balance with a small number of previously released hits. DVD footage of the performance was released on 24 March 1995.

On 21 June 1995, she released her 31st single "Genshi, Onna wa Taiyō Datta", written by Neko Oikawa. Akina stated she wanted to record a summer-like, up-tempo song because her previous singles were quiet ballads. The single debuted at number 15 on the Oricon Weekly Single Charts and charted for 5 weeks.

On 21 July 1995, Nakamori released her 16th studio album La Alteración which included previously released singles with new arrangements. In Spanish, alteracion means change. As in her previous studio album, Nakamori was in charge of the main production of the album. The album jacket was shot in Morocco. The album debuted at number 7 on the Oricon Weekly Album Charts and charted for 8 weeks. In 2002, Nakamori released a re-mastered album with the renewed title La Alteración +4 through Universal Music. This version of the album included four more additional tracks, two singles, and the b-side tracks released in 1995.

On 1 November 1995, Nakamori released her 32nd single "Tokyo Rose", produced by Brian Setzer, who played guitar on the recording. It was her first single in the rockabilly genre. The single debuted at number 32 on the Oricon Weekly Single Charts and charted for 4 weeks.

On 6 December 1995, Nakamori released a compilation album True Album Akina 95 Best. It was her first compilation album released under the label, MCA Victor. The compilation album was divided into a 3-CD set: World Disc, Wild Disc, and Whisper Disc, with 7 tracks included on each CD. Nakamori was the main producer of the album. The album consisted of re-arranged hits released in the '80s and various singles and album tracks released during the first half of the '90s. Wild Disc included the new unreleased song Shangrilla, exclusively recorded for that album. The album debuted at number 16 on the Oricon Weekly Album Charts and charted for 7 weeks.

Between 12 and 16 December 1995, Nakamori held a special concert titled Nakamori Akina True Live in Hyogo's Kobe International House and Kanagawa's Pacifico Yokohama. She performed songs from her albums La Alteración and True Album Akina 95 Best. The live footage was never released as a regular DVD; however, it was included in the limited edition of her compilation album Utahime Densetsu: 90s Best.

In 1996, she celebrated the 15th anniversary of her debut.

In April 1996, she appeared on the first broadcast of the Japanese variety program SMAP×SMAP, performing Kazari ja Nai no yo Namida wa, Tattoo, Ganbarimashou and Desire with the band Smap.

Between 12 and 20 May 1996, Nakamori held her first Dinner Show Tour, 1996 Dinner Show.

On 7 August 1996, Nakamori released her 33rd single "Moonlight Shadow: Tsuki ni Hoero" written by Toshihiko Takamizawa Tetsuya Komuro. It was Nakamori and Komuro's second collaboration since the single "Aibu". Komuro finished the composition around May and the recording in June. The B-side did not include new songs, instead including a remixed version of the lead track. The single debuted at number 14 on the Oricon Weekly Single Charts and charted for 7 weeks.

On 18 December 1996, Nakamori released the mini album Vamp, her first mini-album since the release of mini-album Wonder in 1988. Nakamori was once again the album producer. The mini-album consisted of four songs that weren't included in any studio album and appeared only once before in the first press edition of the compilation album Utahime Densetsu: 90s Best. Before the album's release, she performed all four songs in her second dinner tour show 1996 Xmas Dinner Show, held between 5 and 26 December. The album debuted at number 30 on the Oricon Weekly Album Charts and charted for 5 weeks.

On 21 February 1997, she released her 34th single "Appetite", written by Seriko Natsuno and U-ki. It was released as the lead single to her upcoming studio album. For Nakamori, it was one of the most difficult melodies to practice. The single debuted at number 46 on the Oricon Weekly Single Charts and charted for 4 weeks.

On 21 March 1997, Nakamori released her 17th studio album Shaker. Nakamori was once again the album producer. The album included two previously released singles with new arrangements. In the newspaper Asahi Shinbun, Nakamori explained that the album's melody crosses from digital into acoustic sounds and that she had carefully chosen songs that she could sing in her key. The album debuted at number 14 on the Oricon Weekly Album Charts and charted for 5 weeks. It was her final release under the MCA Victor label. In 2002, a re-mastered album with the renewed title Shaker +3 was released under Universal Music. This version of the album included three additional tracks, singles with the original arrangement, and one b-side track. Between 3 May and 21 June 1997, she held a live tour titled Felicidad, her first tour in almost 9 years. The DVD footage was released on 22 September 1997 through Universal Music. After the tour, she officially left MCA Victor.

=== 1998–1999 ===
In 1998, Nakamori moved to the Gauss Entertainment record label. In January, she played a main role in the Japanese television drama Tsumetai Tsuki. It was her first main role since Sugao no Mama de. She also performed the theme song "Kisei (Never Forget)", written by Yasuhiro Suzu. The single was released on 11 February. Nakamori stated that the balance between low and high pitches was difficult for her to sing. The single debuted at 19 on the Oricon Weekly Single Charts and sold 94k copies. The B-side track was a remastered version of the previous album track Tsuki ga Aoku, which was released on the studio album Shaker.

On 21 May 1998, Nakamori released her thirty-sixth single "Kon'ya, Nagareboshi", written by Keiko Utsumi. The single debuted at number 66 on the Oricon Single Weekly Charts. The B-side track Arashi no Nakade was written by the Russian singer Origa. It was one of her worst-selling singles throughout her two-decade career.

On 17 June 1998, Nakamori released her eighteenth studio album Spoon. The album included two previously released promotional singles. Five out of eleven songs were arranged by Ikurō Fujiwara. In the album booklet, Nakamori is credited as the main producer of the album. The album debuted at number 17 on the Oricon Weekly Album Charts and charted for three weeks. Between 21 June and 17 July, Akina held the national live tour Spoon Tour. The video footage was never released on DVD as of 2019.

On 23 September 1998, she released her 37th single "Tomadoi" written by Juni. "Tomadoi" was selected as the theme song for the Japanese television drama 39Sai no Aki. B-side track Good-bye tears was also chosen as the theme song for a Japanese television drama, Shichinin no OL Sommelier, in which Akina played a minor role. The single debuted at number forty on the Oricon Weekly Single Charts.

On 3 and 4 November 1998, she held a special live show Symphonic Concert '98 with Symphonic A Orchestra.

In January 1999, Nakamori played a main role in the television drama Border Hanzai Shinri Sōsa File. She also performed the theme song "Ophelia", written by Shimano Satoshi, which was released as a single on 21 January 1999. The title "Ophelia" comes from Shakespeares's famous play Hamlet. In this single, Nakamori tried to interpret the character Ofelia's sadness in lyrics; however, she also wanted to sing to all people who were suffering from pain and sadness. The B-Side track was an alternative version of Ofelia under the title To Be, which was sung in English. The single debuted at number 29 on the Oricon Weekly Single Charts and charted for 8 weeks.

The chief of the Gauss Entertainment recording label, Kazuhiro Chiba, caused issues throughout Nakamori's stay with the label: in late 1998, it was announced that a special birthday event would be held in July 1999, however, this was canceled without warning and the 8000-yen refund took about one year. In early December, at a special press conference, Chiba stated that Nakamori was a "troublemaker, who shouldn't exist in the music industry." The cancellation of her contract was announced at the end of the press conference. The cancellation was to take place in December.

On 21 December 1999, Nakamori's final single with Gauss Entertainment, "Trust Me" (written by Kazuhiro Hara) and her 19th studio album, Will, were released. "Trust Me" debuted at number 57 on the Oricon Weekly Single Charts. It is Akina's worst-selling single as of 2019. The B-side track Yuki no Hana, subtitled White X'mas, was a rearranged version of a previously released studio album track. Some fans regard the studio album Will as a compilation album from the Gauss label. It included two previously released singles and remixes of previously released album tracks and Gauss singles. The album track Tsuki no Hohoemi was chosen as a theme song for the video game series Wizardry. The original soundtrack of Wizardry Digmuil included the acoustic and orchestral versions of this song, both written by Fujiwara. The album had only three new songs. On Nakamori's official website, the album is not even listed in the list of original studio albums. The album was produced by Gauss's director, Kazuhiro Chiba. The album debuted at number 52 on the Oricon Weekly Album charts and charted for one week.

=== 2000–2010 ===
In 2000, Nakamori signed a temporary contract with the music production company Koubouraku and established a private office called Faith (nowadays known as a Nakamori fan club, Faithway). Between 18 May and 27 June 2000, she held a national acoustic tour Akina Nakamori 2000: 21 Seiki he. It was her first national tour in two years. Video footage of the tour was included in the limited-edition version of her compilation album All Time Best: Original, released in 2014.

On 31 May 2001, Nakamori released the single "It's Brand New Day", written by Adya. It was her first time releasing a single in two years, and her first R&B song. The single was released under the indies label @ease. The single was released at first as a digital single via the music stream website Music@nifty, then as a standard CD three months later.

Between 6 June and 13 July, she held a national tour titled All About Akina 20th Anniversary It's Brand New Day. It was her national tour in a year. On 27 September, the whole show was released on DVD under the Tokuma Japan Communications record label. The live footage was recorded on 22 June at Tokyo International Forum.

The year of 2002 marked 20 years since Nakamori debuted. Nakamori switched management from Koubouroku to the private office Faith, and transferred to her current record label, Universal Music. To celebrate her first release under her new recording company, she released a cover album titled Zero Album: Utahime 2 on 20 March 2002. In the album booklet, she was credited as the album's main producer. The album debuted at number 10 on the Oricon Weekly Album Charts. It was her first album to debut in the top 10 on the Oricon Charts since her 1995 studio album La Alteración.

On 2 May 2002, Nakamori released her forty-first single "The Heat (Musica Fiesta)", written by Adya. It was also her first release under Universal Music. The B-side tracks were included in her studio album as instrumental recordings. In the media, the single was selected as the May ending theme for the TBS program Wonderful. The single debuted at number 20 on the Oricon Weekly Single Charts.

Three weeks later on 22 May 2002, Nakamori released her 20th studio album Resonancia. It was her first album released under Universal Music and her first album in three years. In Spanish, "resonancia" means "sound." The main instrumental concept of the album was an R&B and Latin rhythm feeling. Uru is credited as the main producer of the album in the album booklet. The album included a re-arranged version of previous singles "It's Brand New Day" and "The Heat: Musica Fiesta". The main writer of the album was Adya. Japanese singer Ken Hirai provided backup vocals for one of the album tracks. The album debuted at number 15 on the Oricon Weekly Album Charts and charted for four weeks. Between 27 May and 13 July she held a live tour, Musica Fiesta Tour 2002.

On 4 December 2002 Nakamori released DVD footage of the Musica Fiesta Live Tour and a self-cover compilation album Akina Nakamori: Utahime Double Decade. The album included self-covers with renewed arrangements and a lowered key to fit her current voice. The album debuted at number 8 on the Oricon Weekly Album Charts. She performed the re-arranged version of Kazarajanai no yo Namida wa at NHK's 53rd Kōhaku Uta Gassen. It was Akina's first appearance in Kōhaku Uta Gassen after 14 years.

On 30 April 2003, Nakamori released her forty-second single Days, written by Tetsurō Oda. The song was chosen as the ending theme for TV Tokyo's television drama Onnna to Ai to Mystery. The B-side track Ruriiro no Chikyuu (a cover of Seiko Matsuda's 1986 single) was the commercial song for Au and Hana was the theme song for NHK-BS1 television program Chikyuu Walker. The single debuted at number 30 on the Oricon Weekly Single Charts and charted for four weeks.

On 14 May 2003, Nakamori released her 21st studio album I Hope So. The title of the album came from a conversation she had with her home-stay family regarding her English skills when she studied abroad in the United States for a month. In the album booklet, Satoshi Takebe is credited as the main producer and arranger of the album. Four album tracks were written by Nakamori herself. The album contains one previously released single. The album track I hope so was chosen as a commercial song for Japan Railways Group. This track later appeared as a b-side on the special single Diva. The album was released in regular and limited editions; the limited edition included the music video for Days. The album debuted at number 15 on the Oricon Weekly Album Charts.

Starting one day after the album release, between 15 May and 13 July 2003, Nakamori held the live tour Akina Nakamori Live Tour 2003 - I hope so -. On 17 December 2003, live footage of the tour was released as a DVD. The footage consisted of footage from the 11 July show, held at the Tokyo International Forum.

On 12 May and 7 July 2004, she collaborated with Korean music producer Kim Hyung Seok on singles "Akai Hana" and "Hajimete Deatta Hi no Yōni". Both songs are Japanese-language covers of Korean singer Park Yong-ha's "Cheoeum Geu Nalcheoleom". This was her first time in 19 years to release a single with the same melody but different lyrics (Meu amor é.../Akaitori Nigeta). "Akai Hana" debuted at number 40 and "Hajimete Deatta Hi no Yō ni" debuted at number 50 on the Oricon Weekly Single Charts.

Between 15 May and 13 July, she held the live tour Akina Nakamori A-1 tour 2004 across 17 cities. As of 2019, there is no video footage.

On 3 December 2004, Nakamori released her third cover album Utahime 3: Finale. All album tracks were arranged by Akira Senju. The producer of the album was Nakamori herself. The album debuted at number 25 on the Oricon Weekly Album Charts.

Between 7 and 17 July 2005, Nakamori held a special live tour Akina Nakamori Special Live 2005 Empress at Club Ex. The live tour was divided into a mix of cover songs previously released on the Utahime cover album, and original tracks. DVD footage of this live tour was released on 11 January 2006 under Avex Trax.

On 7 December 2005, Nakamori released her forty-fifth single "Rakka Ryūsui", written by Takashi Matsumoto and Kenji Hayashida. The B-side included a rock version of Desire. In the media, the single was chosen as the theme song for the Japanese television drama Tenka Souran. The single debuted at number 43 on the Oricon Weekly Single Charts and charted for four weeks.

The year of 2006 marked 25 years since her debut.

In January 2006, Nakamori released her second self-cover compilation album, Best Finger 25th Anniversary Selection. The album included re-recorded songs and singles released between 2004 and 2005. In April 2006, she played a minor role in the television drama Primadame. It was her first acting role in 7 years. She also performed the drama's theme song "Hana yo Odore", which was released on 17 May, written by Hitoshi Haba. The single cover jacket was an illustration done by Nakamori herself when she attended ballet lessons during her early childhood. The single charted at number 23 on the Oricon Weekly Single Charts and charted for six weeks.

On 21 June 2006, Nakamori released her twenty-second studio album Destination. It was her first studio album released in three years. In this album, she returned to the R&B music style for the first time since the Resonancia album in 2002. During fan meets, Nakamori herself stated that she doesn't dislike any of the songs in the album and recommends for everyone to listen to it. The album Destination consisted of two previously released singles with new album arrangements. Eight out of eleven songs were arranged by Yousuke Suzuki. Two tracks were written by Nakamori herself under the pen name Miran:Miran. The album cover jacket was originally from the pamphlet of the Femme Fatale live tour from 1988. The album debuted at number 20 on the Oricon Weekly Album Charts and charted for four weeks. Between 24 June and 8 August, she held the live tour Akina Nakamori Live Tour 2006: The Last destination.

On 17 January 2007, Nakamori released footage from her live tour The Last Destination and her first cover compilation album Utahime Best: 25th Anniversary. This compilation album consisted of cover songs that were released in the compilation album series Utahime and three new cover songs which were previously unreleased. The producer of the album was Nakamori herself. Fourteen of the sixteen songs were re-arranged by Akira Senju. For the album jacket, she wore a light dandelion fluff wig. The album was released in regular and limited editions; the limited edition included a DVD with video footage from several of Nakamori's recording sessions. The album debuted at number 10 on the Oricon Weekly Album Charts. It was her first album in four years to debut in the Top 10.

On 28 March 2007, Nakamori released the ballad compilation album Ballad Best: 25th Anniversary Selection. The album was released as part of the celebration of her 25th debut anniversary. Album tracks consisted of previously released songs from past compilation albums along with one new song Ano Natsu no Hi. However, the tracks Solitude, Nanpasen and Kisei: Never Forget received completely new arrangements. The producer of the album was Nakamori herself. The album was released in regular and limited editions: the limited edition included a DVD digest of footage from her first live tour Akina Milkyway '83 Haru no Kaze wo Kanjite. The album debuted at number 13 on the Oricon Weekly Album Charts and charted for seven weeks.

On 27 June 2007, she released her first enka cover album Enka. The album track selection was based on a fan survey held between 12 April and 15 May, in total more than 23k fans responded. The results were later announced on her page on the Universal Music site. Nine out of thirteen tracks were arranged by Akira Senju, who is credited along with Nakamori as a main producer of the album.

The album was released in a regular edition, cassette tape and two limited editions: the first limited edition included DVD footage with music video clips from 2002 to 2007 and footage of Nakamori recording the album; the second limited edition included a bonus track in the first CD, and the second CD consisted of instrumental versions of Enka covers. There were two types of album jackets: the first and second limited edition had a bust-up photo of Nakamori with special makeup with a Japanese umbrella in the upper part of the jacket. The regular and cassette editions featured similar makeup; however, the hairstyle was different. The album debuted at number 10 on the Oricon Weekly Album chart and charted for twelve weeks. Later it was rewarded with the RIAJ Gold Disc and Japan Record Awards.

On 27 February 2008, Nakamori released her first compilation album of her songs from the 90s, Utahime Densetsu: 90s Best. The album consisted of songs released between 1991 and 1999. The album was released in regular and limited editions: while the regular edition had one disc with 13 tracks (a mix of singles and b-sides), the limited edition included four discs which consisted of three CDs with various album tracks and DVD footage of her special live show Nakamori Akina True Live, filmed in 1995. The third disc included a previously unrecorded duet Second Love with the writer of the song, Takao Kisugi. The album debuted at number 33 on the Oricon Weekly Album Charts and charted for three weeks.

On 19 November 2008, Nakamori performed a duet titled Dramatic Airport with Junichi Inagaki. The song was included in Inagaki's cover album Otoko to Onna: Two hearts Two voices.

On 24 December 2008, she released a new cover album titled Folk Song: Utahime Jojouka. The album contains covers of folk songs released during the '70s. Among 200 songs which Nakamori considered, she chose eleven to record. The producer of the album was Yuuji Toriyama. The album was released in one regular edition and five limited editions with a different color jacket of an image of Marilyn Monroe by Andy Warhol. The limited-edition A includes DVD footage of Nakamori recording the album. The album debuted at number 30 on the Oricon Weekly Album Charts and charted for seven weeks.

On 24 June 2009, Nakamori released another cover album, Mood Kayō: Utahime Shōwa Meikyoku Shū. The album consisted of kayōkyoku songs released between the 1960s and 1970s. Youichi Murata reprise his role as a sound arranger for the first time since her self-cover compilation album Utahime Double Decade. The album was released in regular and limited editions: the limited edition included a DVD of recording footage of three of the album tracks. The album debuted at number 30 on the Oricon Weekly Album Charts and charted for three weeks.

On 29 July 2009, Nakamori released a music video clip DVD (Clip 2002-2007 & more) and a second album in her folk song cover series, Folk Song 2: Utahime Aishouka. Toriyama reprised his role as the sound producer and main arranger. The album cover jacket was a caricature by Japanese caricaturist Kage. The album was released in regular and limited editions; the limited edition included DVD footage of Nakamori recording the album. The album debuted at number 33 on the Oricon Weekly Album Charts.

Between 18 and 28 August 2009, Nakamori held another special live tour, titled Akina Nakamori Special Live 2009 "Empress at Yokohama". The live tour consisted of cover tracks which she released through her various cover albums. DVD footage of the live tour was released on 18 August 2010. As of 2019, it is her last tour.

On 26 August 2009, Nakamori released her twenty-third studio album, Diva. It was her first studio album in three years since Destination.

On 23 September 2009, Nakamori released a special single titled "Diva Single Version" with a new intro arrangement with two B-side tracks, the original version of Heartache, which was previously released only as a single and a re-recorded album track, I hope so, from the album of the same name. The single debuted at number 50 on the Oricon Weekly Single Charts.

On 13 July 2010, Nakamori wrote and released a digital single, "Crazy Love". The single was released via the streaming services Chaku-Uta and Recochoku. It was used as background music for pachinko slot parlors. For players who won the full combination of points, a short music video clip of Crazy Love was shown.

On 28 October 2010, Nakamori's staff announced her indefinite hiatus from music activities due to fatigue and health problems.

On 22 December 2010, a 6-DVD set box Nakamori Akina in Hit Studio and on 15 December 2011, a 5-DVD set box The Best Ten Nakamori Akina Premium Box were released.

=== 2014–2017 ===
On 4 August 2014, Universal Music released two best albums on the same day: All Time Best: Original and All Time Best: Utahime Cover. All Time Best: Original consisted of Nakamori's biggest hits from between 1982 and 2009, her previously released digital single, and a new song Sweet Rain. The All Time Best: Original album was released in regular and limited editions; the limited edition included live footage from Akina Nakamori 2000: 21 Seiki he. The album debuted at number 3 on the Oricon Weekly Album Charts. It was recognized by RIAJ. All Time Best: Utahime Cover consisted of cover songs that Nakamori released between 1994 and 2009. The album was released in regular and limited editions; the limited edition included live footage from Songs: Nakamori Akina Utahime Special. The album debuted at number 7 on the Oricon Weekly Album Charts.

On 31 December 2014, Nakamori made a stage appearance for the first time in several years, appearing in that year's Kōhaku Uta Gassen, broadcast from her recording studio in New York. In the broadcast, she performed her new song "Rojo (Tierra)". With this comeback, she also announced her complete return to the music industry.

On 20 January 2015, Nakamori released a new cover album, Utahime 4: My Eggs Benedict. It was her first cover album in 6 years and the first new addition to the Utahime album series in 11 years. Unlike the previous cover album, this album featured J-pop songs released during the '90s–'00s.

On 21 January 2015, Nakamori wrote and released her 49th single Rojo-Tierra. It was her first single released in five years. The single was released in regular and limited editions: the limited edition included a making-of video clip of Rojo-Tierra. The single debuted at number 8 on the Oricon Weekly Single Charts and charted for eight weeks. The single was awarded by the Japan Gold Disc Award as the Best Enka/Kayokuyoku Artist.

On 30 September 2015, Nakamori released her 50th single "Unfixable", written by Hilde Wahl, Anita Lipsky, Tommy Berre and Marietta Constantinou. For the first time in 28 years, Nakamori released an original song in English. The single was released in regular and limited editions: the limited edition included image footage of "Unfixable". The single debuted at number 20 on the Oricon Single Weekly Charts and debuted at number 3 on the Recochoku Single Weekly Charts.

On 30 December 2015, Nakamori released her 24th studio album, Fixer. It was her first studio album since her hiatus. The album consists of two previously released singles from 2015, both in original and album re-arranged versions, which are listed as bonus tracks. The album version of Fixer: While the Women are Sleeping was chosen as a movie theme song for the movie Onna ga Nemuru Toki. It was her first movie theme song in 24 years. The album was released in regular and limited editions; the limited edition included a DVD music video clip of Fixer: While the Women are Sleeping. The album debuted at number 7 on the Oricon Weekly Album Charts and debuted at number 8 on the Recochoku Weekly Album Charts.

On 24 February 2016, Nakamori released the single "Fixer (While the Women Are Sleeping)", written by Nakamori herself for the film While the Women Are Sleeping. The CD doesn't start with the lead song, but instead the B-side track, Hirari (Sakura), written by Kouhei Munemoto and a member of the band Porno Graffitti, Haruichi Shindō. It was her first original song about cherry blossoms. The single debuted at number 32 on the Oricon Weekly Single Chart.

On 30 November 2016, Nakamori released a jazz cover album titled Belie. The album consists of songs from various periods with jazz arrangements and a rhythmic feeling. The album was released in regular and limited editions: the limited edition includes a DVD of music video clips of all the cover songs. The album debuted at number 8 on the Oricon Weekly Album Chart and debuted at number 5 on the Recochoku Weekly Album Chart. On 21 December 2016, a renewed version of the cover album titled Belie+Vampire was released. Vampire consists of 6 cover tracks as part of the upcoming celebration of her 35th debut anniversary.

On 8 November 2017, Nakamori released both a eurobeat cover album Cage and her twenty-fifth original studio album, Akina. Cage featured Eurobeat and disco songs, which were first recorded in the '80s. Except for one track, the rest of the album's songs were performed in English. The main album arranger was Kengo Sasaki. The album was released in regular and limited editions; the limited edition consists of six minutes of footage from Nakamori's 35th-anniversary celebration. The album debuted at number 8 on the Oricon Weekly Chart. Akina was released in regular and limited editions; the limited edition included a booklet-sized 2018 calendar. The album debuted at number 9 on Oricon and at number 10 on Recochoku.

=== 2022–present ===
After a five-year hiatus, Nakamori opened a new Twitter account and official website on August 30th, 2022. She announced that she transferred her management from Faith to a new label called HZ Village; she also stated that her physical condition is not ideal yet.

In April 2023, Japanese cinemas screened a 4K remastered version of her live session "East Live Index" for a limited period of time. At the end of the footage, there was a recorded voice-only message from Nakamori, the first time in several years that her real voice was heard. After stepping away from her singing activities, Nakamori made an appearance on Tetsuji Hayashi's tribute album 50th Anniversary Special A Tribute of Hayashi Tetsuji: Saudade, for which she re-recorded her 1984 single "Kita Wing" in an orchestral pop style. The album was released on November 8th, 2023. This would be the first time in six years that she would release new music. In December 2023, Nakamori gave a message to listeners during the 4-hour radio special Nakamori Akina All Time Request which was aired on the Nippon Broadcasting System. It was her first public media appearance in nine years; she last appeared during the 65th edition of the Kōhaku Uta Gassen in 2014. On December 23rd, 2023, Nakamori's management announced the launch of her official YouTube channel and a day later, they uploaded the official music video of Kita Wing-Classic. The news regarding its launch was first reported on the Taiwanese news website Liberty Times. Within 24 hours of its upload, the video received more than 1 million views.

In March 2024, her unreleased song, "Hello Mary-Lou", originally featured in a 1988 television commercial, was released for the first time as part of her Best Collection: Love Songs & Pop Songs album reissue. Between April and May 2024, she uploaded jazz-arranged versions of "Slow Motion", "Kita Wing", "Gypsy Queen" and "Tattoo". As of June 2024, a portion of her songs "Desire" and "Second Love" are currently used as train melodies for Kiyose Station. Nakamori celebrated her 59th birthday with a fan club-exclusive event, making it her first physical public appearance since 2017.

Following with her new original song in 8 years, Nakamori released "Merry Christmas, My Heart" which she stated herself after the release of the song during a dinner show she considers herself now a singer-songwriter which 90% of her songs were rejected by her previous labels and thought that her rejected compositions was too enka resulting from being scrapped.

== Humanitarian ventures ==
In 1998, Nakamori, alongside José Carreras and Andy Lau among others, participated in the Food Aid Concert charity concert on 17 October. The proceeds from the concert and the subsequent gala dinner went to feed North Korean children.

In December 2023, Nakamori participated in a charity auction where she auctioned a hat that was used in her 2023 photoshoot. The proceeds from the auction were given to the non-profit organization Positive Living through AIDS Orphan Support (abbreviated as PLAS) to help African orphans with AIDS.

== Personal life ==
In 1984, during the filming of the movie Ai Tabidachi, the relationship between Nakamori and fellow singer-actor Masahiko Kondo gradually became known to the public. Their relationship was approved by her family and Kondo visited her family many times while they were dating. In July 1989, Nakamori attempted suicide at Kondo's apartment. Sustaining a deep wound on her wrist, she was immediately hospitalized. The incident prompted Nakamori to temporarily step away from the public eye. Some journalists believed that her rival, Seiko Matsuda and Kondo were spotted together by the tabloid magazine Friday which could have been one of the reasons for the attempted suicide. However, in December, five months after the incident, during a press conference, Kondo stated that they had never been in a relationship.

In 1987, Nakamori's sister Akiho made her acting debut as an actress in a television drama. A year later in 1988, she published her first and only photo-book and adult-video album. Due to their facial similarities and sharing the same surname, there were some people who believed that it was actually Akina, not knowing it was actually her sister. However, Akiho's career was not successful and within a few years, she retired from acting and did not make any further public appearances. In 2019, when Akiho died, it was reported that Nakamori did not attend the funeral.

In 1988, Nakamori's mother, Chieko was diagnosed with rectal cancer for the first time. Despite surgical efforts, her mother eventually died in 1995. Nakamori did not attend her mother's funeral. This led to distance in her relationship with her remaining family. Twenty-nine years later, her father died.

In an interview on the music television program Yoru no Hit Studio in 1989, singer and former idol Kyoko Koizumi shared how Nakamori aided her after she was egged during the Shinjuku Music Festival, describing her as "a very kind and considerate person, which is rare to find in the entertainment industry". The incident became one of the moments that sparked their friendship to develop.

In 2023, while Nakamori was delivering a message during Nippon Broadcasting System's Nakamori Akina All Time Request radio special, she stated that she is currently single.

== Artistry ==
=== Influences ===
Nakamori has been cited by many Instagram influencers in their teens and 20s, idols, and musicians as their main influence in music and fashion. Speaking to Billboard Japan in 2012, singer-songwriter Leo Ieiri cited Nakamori, alongside Momoe Yamaguchi and Princess Princess, as artists she has loved since elementary school due to their mature lyrics and melodies. She also stated in 2018 that she owns a DVD collection of Nakamori's appearances in The Best Ten and she takes inspiration from it. In a 2023 interview, singer and actress Yoko Minamino said that she took fashion inspiration from Nakamori during her debut period. Voice actress and singer Sora Amamiya shared that she was inspired by Nakamori's songs while in the process of songwriting for her 2022 compilation album and subsequently for her 2023 EP. Contemporary kayokyoku singer Kawai Fujii listed Nakamori's "Shōjo A" and "Nanpasen" as two of her personal favorite songs, and even performed for an ad campaign. Musician Miya of Mucc and Petit Brabancon cited Nakamori as the only pop artist he ever listens to, as he is not a fan of pop music in general.

== Legacy ==
Nakamori was honored by the Japanese Music Critics as the 5th best voice in the country's recording history, even ahead of her rival, Seiko Matsuda, who was honored at 7th place. According to the Oricon Charts, she is one of a handful of singers who managed to have albums in the Top 10 in the 1980s, 1990s, 2000s and 2010s. HMV Japan ranked her as the No. 55 Top Japanese Artist of All Time.

As of 2011, Nakamori has sold over 25.3 million records and was named the third best-selling female Japanese idol singer of all time.

Between December 2022 and January 2023, in a survey of The 100 Best 80s Showa Idols held by Remindetop, Nakamori came in at Number 1. The results of the survey were published in March and a special television program about the survey was broadcast in July on the Kayo Pops television channel.

== Discography ==
Studio albums

- Prologue (1982)
- Variation (1982)
- Fantasy (1983)
- New Akina Etranger (1983)
- Anniversary (1984)
- Possibility (1984)
- Bitter and Sweet (1985)
- D404ME (1985)
- Fushigi (1986)
- Crimson (1986)
- Cross My Palm (1987)
- Stock (1988)
- Femme Fatale (1988)
- Cruise (1989)
- Unbalance+Balance (1993)
- Utahime (1994)
- La Alteración (1995)
- Shaker (1997)
- Spoon (1998)
- Will (1999)
- Zero Album: Utahime 2 (2002)
- Resonancia (2002)
- I hope so (2003)
- Utahime 3: Shūmaku (2003)
- Destination (2006)
- Enka (2007)
- Folk Song: Utahime Jojouka (2008)
- Mood Kayō: Utahime Shōwa Meikyoku Shū (2009)
- Folk Song 2: Utahime Aishouka (2009)
- Diva (2009)
- Utahime 4: My Eggs Benedict (2015)
- Fixer (2015)
- Belie (2016)
- Vampire (2017)
- Cage (2017)
- Akina (2017)

== Tours ==
- Akina Milkyway '83: Haru no Kaze wo Kanjite
- Rainbow Shower (1983)
- Aitai Na Aeruka Na: Akina Nakamori Ongaku Kanshō Kai (1984)
- Bitter and Sweet (1985)
- Light and Shade (1986)
- A Hundred Days (1987)
- Femme Fatale (1988)
- True Live (1995)
- Felicidad (1997)
- Spoon (1998)
- Akina Nakamori 2000: 21 Seiki e no Tabidachi
- All About Akina 20th Anniversary: It's Brand New Day (2001)
- Musica Fiesta Tour (2002)
- Akina Nakamori Live Tour 2003: I Hope So
- Akina Nakamori A-1 Tour (2004)
- Akina Nakamori Live Tour 2006: The Last Destination

== Filmography ==
=== Film ===
Year	Title	Role	Notes
1985	Ai Tabidachi	Yuki Koizumi	Protagonic
1987	Best Friend: Ningen Kousaten Yori	Aya Kashima	Protagonic
1992	Hashire Melos!	Raisa	Voice role

=== Television ===
Aired	Title	Role	Chapters
04-13-1992 to 06–29–1992	Sugao No Mama De	Kanna Tsukishima	12
01-12-1998 to 03–16–1998	Tsumetai Tsuki	Shiina Kiyoka	10
01-11-1999 to 03–08–1999	Border: Hanzai Shinri Sosa File	Kirie Tsugishima	9
05-12-2006 to 06–21–2006	Primadam	Kana Manda	11
04-04-2025 to present	Araiguma Calcal-dan	Vocal	TBA

==== Kōhaku Uta Gassen appearances ====
Year / Broadcast	Appearance	Song	Appearance order	Opponent
1983 (Shōwa 58) / 34th	Debut	"Kinku"	11/21	Masahiko Kondō
1984 (Shōwa 59) / 35th	2	"Jukkai (1984)"	7/20	Masahiko Kondō
1985 (Shōwa 60) / 36th	3	"Meu amor é..."	7/20	Toshihiko Tahara
1986 (Shōwa 61) / 37th	4	"Desire (Jōnetsu)"	6/20	Kenji Sawada
1987 (Shōwa 62) / 38th	5	"Nanpasen"	4/20	The Checkers
1988 (Shōwa 63) / 39th	6	"I Missed the Shock"	4/21	Masahiko Kondō
2002 (Heisei 14) / 53rd	7	"Kazari ja Nai no yo Namida wa"	20/27	Kenichi Mikawa

== See also ==
- List of best-selling music artists in Japan
