= Mood Kayō: Utahime Shōwa Meikyoku Shū =

Studio album by Akina Nakamori
- Released: 24 June 2009
- Recorded: 2009
- Studio: Sound Inn Studio; Crescent Studio; Sony Music Studios Tokyo, Studio at the Palms
- Genre: Mood Kayokyoku, Jazz
- Length: 39:10
- Language: Japanese
- Label: Universal Music Japan
- Producer: Akira Terabayashi; Takashi Fujikura; Takashi Kadomura

Akina Nakamori chronology
| Folk Song: Utahime Jojouka (2008) | Mood Kayō: Utahime Shōwa Meikyoku Shū (2009) | Folk Song 2: Utahime Aishouka (2009) |

Mood Kayō: Utahime Shōwa Meikyoku Shū (ムード歌謡 〜歌姫昭和名曲集) is a covers album by Japanese singer Akina Nakamori. It was released on 24 June 2009 by Universal Music Japan. It is Nakamori's sixth covers album.

The album was released in limited and regular editions. The regular edition includes four minutes of footage of the recording of the three album songs.

The album consists of the Modo Kayoukyoku songs, which were released in Japan during the 1960s and 1970s.

== Chart performance ==
Mood Kayō: Utahime Shōwa Meikyoku Shū debuted at number 30 on the Oricon Album weekly chart, charted for 3 weeks and sold over 6,400 copies.

== Track listing ==
| No. | Title | Original performer | Length |
|---|---|---|---|
| 1. | "Kiki Kayou Opening (氣氛歌謡)" | Youichi Murata | 1:51 |
| 2. | "Keiken (経験)" | Mari Henmi | 2:18 |
| 3. | "Koi no Kisetsu (恋の季節)" | Pinky & Killers | 3:05 |
| 4. | "Yume wa Yoru Hiraku (夢は夜ひらく)" | Keiko Fuji | 4:29 |
| 5. | "Tanin no Kankei (他人の関係)" | Katsuko Kanai | 4:00 |
| 6. | "Omokage (面影)" | Yuri Shimazaki | 4:28 |
| 7. | "Ame no Midousuji (雨の御堂筋)" | Ouyang Fei Fei | 2:42 |
| 8. | "Love You Tokyo (ラブユー東京)" | Los Primos | 2:31 |
| 9. | "Ki no Kutsushita (絹の靴下)" | Mari Natsuki | 2:08 |
| 10. | "Como Esta Akasaka (コモエスタ赤坂)" | Los Indios | 2:50 |
| 11. | "Hijou no License (非情のライセンス)" | Yōko Nogiwa | 3:39 |
| 12. | "Isezakicho no Blues (伊勢佐木町ブルース)" | Mina Aoe | 3:31 |
| 13. | "Kiki Kayou Ending (氣氛歌謡)" | Murata | 1:38 |

== Release history ==
| Year | Format(s) | Serial number | Label(s) | Ref. |
|---|---|---|---|---|
| 2009 | CD, CD+DVD | UMCK-1315, UMCK-9283 | UMJ | |
| 2017 | UHQCD | UPCH-7281 | UMJ | |
| 2023 | CD | UPCY-7875 | UMJ | |
| 2024 | LP | UPJY-9379 | UMJ | |
