= K-1 The Arena Fighters =

1996 fighting video game

- Developer: Daft Co.
- Publishers: JP: Xing Entertainment; WW: THQ
- Series: K-1 Fighting
- Platform: PlayStation
- Release: JP: August 9, 1996; NA: February 28, 1997; EU: May 1997
- Genre: Fighting
- Modes: Single-player, multiplayer

K-1 The Arena Fighters, known in Japan as Fighting Illusion 〜K-1 GRAND PRIX〜, is a video game developed by Japanese studio Daft Co. and published by Xing Entertainment and THQ for the PlayStation in 1996-1997.

== Reception ==
Reception

Aggregate score
Aggregator	Score
GameRankings	65%

Review scores
Publication	Score
Electronic Gaming Monthly	7.5/10
EP Daily	7.5/10
Famitsu	25/40
Game Informer	6.75/10
GamePro	4/5 (Note: GamePro gave the game three 4.5/5 scores for graphics, sound, and control, and 4/5 for overall fun factor.)
GameSpot	5.8/10
IGN	4.5/10
Joypad	3/10
Next Generation	2/5

The game received mixed reviews. Next Generation said, "While the developers should be given credit for trying to add realism to a fighting genre, the implementation of the actual game mechanics is another story entirely. Plagued by an annoyingly slow response, K-1 ends up being an exercise in frustration. For all practical purposes, players are limited to just one or two punches or kicks, which sacrifices gameplay for realism and quickly grows quite tiresome." In Japan, Famitsu gave it a score of 25 out of 40.
