= Utahime 4: My Eggs Benedict =

Studio album by Akina Nakamori
- Released: 10 January 2015
- Recorded: United States, autumn 2014
- Genre: J-pop
- Length: 54:11
- Language: Japanese
- Label: Universal Music Japan
- Producer: Yuuji Toriyama

Akina Nakamori chronology
| All Time Best: Original & Cover (2014) | Utahime 4: My Eggs Benedict (2015) | Fixer (2015) |

Utahime 4: My Eggs Benedict (歌姫4 -My Eggs Benedict-) is a covers album by Japanese singer Akina Nakamori. It was released on 10 January 2015 under Universal Music Japan. It is Nakamori's eighth covers album. It was also Nakamori's first album to be published after 6 years after being on hiatus.

It was the final album to be produced by producer Yuuji Toriyama.

The album is officially considered as the fourth album of the Utahime cover series. The album consists of covers of pop songs released in Japan during the 1990s and 2000s.

The album was released in regular and first-press editions. The limited edition includes recording footage of the album. Both of the album jackets were taken with a film camera by Nakamori herself.

== Chart performance ==
Utahime 4: My Eggs Benedict debuted at number 5 on the Oricon Album weekly chart, charted for 11 weeks and sold over 26,500 copies.。

== Track listing ==
| No. | Title | Original artist | Length |
|---|---|---|---|
| 1. | "Standard Number" | Yoshitaka Minami | 3:54 |
| 2. | "Mayonaka no Door" | Miki Matsubara | 4:40 |
| 3. | "Lovers Again" | Exile | 5:11 |
| 4. | "Nagai Aida" | Kiroro | 5:42 |
| 5. | "Hanamizuki" | Yo Hitoto | 5:42 |
| 6. | "Ai no Uta" | Koda Kumi | 4:55 |
| 7. | "Fragile" | Every Little Thing | 5:27 |
| 8. | "Seppun Kiss" | Original Love | 5:09 |
| 9. | "Soshite Boku wa Touhou ni Kureru" | Yoshiyuki Ohsawa | 4:43 |
| 10. | "Yasashii Kiss wo Shite" | Dreams Come True | 3:31 |
| 11. | "Yuki no Hana" | Mika Nakashima | 5:09 |

== Release history ==
| Year | Format(s) | Serial number | Label(s) | Ref. |
|---|---|---|---|---|
| 2015 | CD, CD+DVD | UPCH-2017, UPCH-9988 | UMJ | |
| 2017 | UHQCD | UPCH-7286 | UMJ | |
| 2023 | CD | UPCY-7875 | UMJ | |
| 2024 | 2LP | UPJY-9381/2 | UMJ | |
