= I Hope So =

Studio album by Akina Nakamori
- Released: 14 May 2003
- Recorded: 2003
- Studio: West Side; On-Air Mafu Studio; Heartbeat Recording Studio
- Genre: J-pop
- Length: 52:57
- Language: Japanese
- Label: Universal Music Japan
- Producer: Satoshi Takebe

Akina Nakamori chronology
Utahime Double Decade (2002)	I Hope So (2003)	Utahime 3: Shūmaku (2003)

Singles from I Hope So
- 1. "Days" Released: 30 April 2003

I Hope So (stylized as I hope so) is the twenty first studio album by Japanese singer-songwriter Akina Nakamori and second studio album to be released during the 2000s. It was released on 14 May 2003 under the Universal Music Japan label. The album includes the lead single "Days".

The album includes four of Akina's original written songs: "Niji", "I Hope So", "Veil" and "Days".

== Promotion ==
=== Singles ===
It consists of one previously released single.

"Days" is the forty second single written by Nakamori herself and Oda Tetsuro. It was released on 30 April 2003 under Universal Music Japan. It was her only single to be released in that year. The single was promoted as an ending theme to the Japanese television drama Onna to Ai to Mystery. The single was included in the compilation album Best Finger 25th anniversary selection and All Time Best: Originals.

The single debuted at number 30 on Oricon Single Weekly Charts.

== Stage performances ==
"Days", "Utsutsu no Hana", "Tsumugi Uta" and "Kaze no Hate" has been performed in the anniversary live tour Akina Nakamori 2003: I Hope So.

"I Hope So" has been performed in the one-night special live AKINA NAKAMORI Special Live 2009 “Empress at Yokohama”.

== Chart performance ==
The album reached number 15 on the Oricon Album Weekly Chart charted for the 6 consecutive weeks with the sales of 18,000 copies. During its re-release in 2023, the album debut at number 79 on the Billboard Japan´s Album Weekly Charts.

== Track listing ==
All tracks are arranged by Satoshi Takebe.

I Hope So track listing
No.	Title	Lyrics	Music	Length
1.	"Toki" (instrumental)		Satoshi Takebe	1:59
2.	"Rain"	Mayo Okamoto	Okamoto	5:18
3.	"Niji"	Akina Nakamori	Ryouki Matsumoto	4:27
4.	"Hikari" (instrumental)		Takebe	0:56
5.	"Kaze no Hate"	Matsui Goro	Oda Tetsuro	4:25
6.	"I Hope So"	Nakamori	Shinjiro Inoue・Takebe	4:43
7.	"Veil"	Nakamori	Takebe	3:54
8.	"Yoi" (instrumental)		Takebe	1:15
9.	"Yuuyami wo Matte"	Minako Kawae	Kawae	5:05
10.	"Doukei"	Kawae	Zenkyu	4:19
11.	"Tsumugi Uta"	Kawae	Kawae	4:56
12.	"Yume" (instrumental)		Takebe	2:03
13.	"Utsutsu no Hana"	Matsui	Tatsurou Mashikota	4:21
14.	"Days"	Nakamori	Oda	4:57

== Covers ==
- Mayo Okamoto self-covered provided song Rain in her 2010 album "Close to you".

== Release history ==
Year	Format(s)	Serial number	Label(s)	Ref.
2003	CD, CD+DVD	UMCK-1162, UMCK-9035	UMJ	
2017	UHQCD	UPCH-7272	UMJ	
2023	LP, CD	UPCY-7839, UPJY-9348	UMJ	
