= Utahime =

Studio album by Akina Nakamori
- Released: 24 March 1994; 4 December 2002
- Recorded: 1994
- Genre: Kayōkyoku
- Length: 45:23
- Language: Japanese
- Label: MCA Victor
- Producer: Akina Nakamori

Akina Nakamori chronology
Unbalance+Balance (1993)	Utahime (1994)	La Alteración (1995)

Singles from Utahime
- 1. "Kataomoi/Aibu" Released: 24 March 1994

Utahime (歌姫) is a covers album by Japanese singer Akina Nakamori. It was released on 24 March 1994, by MCA Victor. It is Nakamori's first covers album, and her only covers album to be released in the 1990s. On the same day, the promotional cover single "Kataomoi" was released.

The calligraphy on the album cover was written by Yousui Inoue.

The re-printed version includes instrumental versions of the cover tracks arranged by Akira Senju. In 2002, Nakamori returned to her Utahime cover album series under Universal Music Japan.

== Stage performance ==
In December 1994, Nakamori held a one-night "Utahime Akina Nakamori Live" show in Parco Theatre, where she performed "Aizenbashi", "Watashi wa Kaze", "Shishuuki" and "Dance wa Umaku Odorenai".

== Chart performance ==
Utahime debuted at number 5 on the Oricon Album weekly chart, charted for nine weeks and sold over 140,500 copies.

== Track listing ==
No.	Title	Original performer	Length
1.	"Dance wa Umaku Odorenai (ダンスはうまく踊れない)"	Seri Ishikawa	5:41
2.	"Aizenbashi (愛染橋)"	Momoe Yamaguchi	4:41
3.	"Kataomoi (片想い)"	Mie Nakao	4:43
4.	"Shishuuki (思秋期)"	Hiromi Iwasaki	4:43
5.	"Aitakute Aitakute (逢いたくて逢いたくて)"	Mari Sono	4:05
6.	"Shuuchaku Eki (終着駅)"	Chiyo Okumura	4:04
7.	"Maho no Kagami (魔法の鏡)"	Arai Yumi	4:00
8.	"Ikigai (生きがい)"	Saori Yuki	4:05
9.	"Watashi wa Kaze (私は風)"	Carmen Maki & Oz	10:09

== Release history ==
Year	Format(s)	Serial number	Label(s)	Ref.
1994	CT, CD	MVCC-12, MVCD-12	MCA	
2004	2CD	UMCK-1150/1	UMJ	
2017	2-UHQCD	UPCH-7268/9	UMJ	
2023	2CD	UPCY-7867/8	UMJ	
2024	2LP	UPJY-9371/2	UMJ	

Notes: Since 2004 re-releases, it publishes as a 2-CD album under subtitle "Special Edition". Second disc includes instrumental versions of the tracks.
