= Genshi, Onna wa Taiyō Datta =

Single by Akina Nakamori

from the album La Alteración
- Language: Japanese
- English title: Primitive, the Woman Was the Sun
- B-side: "Kirei"
- Released: June 21, 1995
- Recorded: 1995
- Genre: J-pop; Latin
- Length: 4:46
- Label: MCA Victor
- Composer: Masaki
- Lyricist: Neko Oikawa

Akina Nakamori singles chronology
"Gekka" (1994)	"Genshi, Onna wa Taiyō Datta" (1995)	"Tokyo Rose" (1995)

"Genshi, Onna wa Taiyō Datta" (原始、女は太陽だった; lit. "Primitive, the Woman Was the Sun") is the 31st single by Japanese entertainer Akina Nakamori. Written by Neko Oikawa and Masaki, the single was released on June 21, 1995, by MCA Victor. It was also the lead single from her 16th studio album La Alteración.

The single peaked at No. 15 on Oricon's weekly singles chart and sold over 100,200 copies.

== Track listing ==
All music is arranged by Yasunori Iwasaki.

Original release
No.	Title	Lyrics	Music	Length
1.	"Genshi, Onna wa Taiyō Datta" ((原始、女は太陽だった; "Primitive, the Woman Was the Sun"))	Neko Oikawa	Masaki	4:46
2.	"Kirei" ((綺麗; "Beautiful"))	Seriko Natsuno	Chiho Kiyooka	4:09
3.	"Genshi, Onna wa Taiyō Datta" (Original Karaoke)			4:46
4.	"Kirei" (Original Karaoke)			4:09
Total length:				18:10

== Charts ==
Chart (1995)	Peak position
Japan (Oricon)	15
