= Hana yo Odore =

Single by Akina Nakamori

from the album Destination
- Language: Japanese
- English title: Flower Dance
- B-side: "Game"
- Released: May 17, 2006
- Recorded: 2006
- Genre: J-pop; dance-pop
- Length: 4:20
- Label: Universal Sigma
- Composer: Hitoshi Haba
- Lyricist: Karen

Akina Nakamori singles chronology
"Rakka Ryūsui" (2005)	"Hana yo Odore" (2006)	"Diva Single Version" (2009)

"Hana yo Odore" (花よ踊れ; lit. "Flower Dance") is the 46th single by Japanese entertainer Akina Nakamori. Written by Karen and Hitoshi Haba, the single was released on May 17, 2006, by Universal Sigma. It was also the lead single from her 22nd studio album Destination.

== Background ==
"Hana yo Odore" was used as the ending theme song of the NTV drama series Primadam (プリマダム, Purimadamu), which also starred Nakamori. The jacket cover is an illustration of Nakamori as a child ballerina, as she has practiced ballet since childhood.

== Chart performance ==
"Hana yo Odore" peaked at No. 23 on Oricon's weekly singles chart and sold over 10,400 copies.

== Track listing ==
Original release
No.	Title	Lyrics	Music	Arrangement	Length
1.	"Hana yo Odore" ((花よ踊れ; "Flower Dance"))	Karen	Hitoshi Haba	Hiroshi Uesugi	4:20
2.	"Game"	Shū Kudō	Kenji Hayashida	Uesugi; Hayashida	4:58
3.	"Hana yo Odore" (Instrumental)				4:18
4.	"Game" (Instrumental)				4:58
Total length:					18:34

== Charts ==
Chart (2006)	Peak position
Japan (Oricon)	23
