= Miki Corporation =

Diamond company

Miki Corporation (株式会社三貴) is a Japanese processed/natural diamond dealer. It is the corporation which manages stores such as "Jewellery Maki" and "Joyeux Couture Maki". Their leading product is the Camelia Diamond.

The enterprise was established by Kimura Kazuo, a graduate in Commerce of Waseda University. It produces expensive luxury jewels in large quantities and was once considered the company charging prices with highest profit margins in the world. However, it also sold goods at cheap prices and was considered the main enterprise establishing the trend of using luxury gems as a fashion commodity in the general public of Japan.

During the economic bubble period, the retail stores soon developed and expanded to clothing for women and children. The number of retail outlets soon reached over 1,400, through cooperation with suppliers and production factories from China and Thailand, mainly Maxer Corporation of Hong Kong. The enterprise grew to become one of the largest firms in Japan with over 8,000 workers and gross sales of 1,700 billion yen. In 1980s its sales rose to the top in the world overtaking Tiffany's.

In terms of scale, it was ranked 1st in Japan for jewellery and 6th for women's clothing.

At the time, 30% of the diamonds from De Beers, the syndicate of worldwide diamond dealers were wholesaled by this company.

== Main characters in commercials ==
Although most spokespersons used in the commercials of retail stores under Miki Corporation have been Japanese, few Western celebrities have also been used. These include

- Susan Anton (1980)
- Sharon Stone (1992)
- Paulina Pollikova (1994–1998)
- Bruce Willis (1997–1998)
