= Mariko Takahashi (singer) =

Japanese female singer (born 1949)

- Birth name: Mariko Morioka
- Born: March 6, 1949 (age 76)
- Origin: Hatsukaichi, Hiroshima Prefecture, Japan
- Genres: Jazz, pop
- Occupation: Singer
- Years active: 1973–present
- Labels: Victor Entertainment
- Website: www.the-musix.com/mariko

Mariko Takahashi (高橋 真梨子, Takahashi Mariko, born March 6, 1949 in Hiroshima Prefecture, Japan) is a Japanese female singer. She is known for her ballad pop songs. She began her singing career in 1973 singing covers, but soon progressed to writing her own songs. She is also able to play piano and saxophone.

On May 20, 2009, Takahashi released the cover album of Japanese male singers, No Reason: Otoko Gokoro, in which she covered Kyu Sakamoto's "Miagete Goran Yoru no Hoshi o" and Yūzō Kayama's "Kimi to Itsumademo." The album debuted at No. 7 on the Japanese Oricon album charts. Representative works include'Peach Breath' (Peach Breath / 1984).
