= Akira Senju =

Japanese composer, arranger and conductor

Akira Senju 千住 明
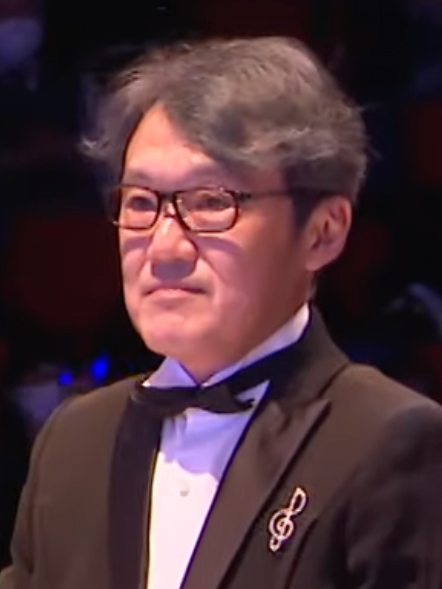
- Senju in 2022

Background information
- Born: Akira Senju; 21 October 1960 (age 65); Tokyo, Japan
- Genres: Instrumental; music score; anime soundtrack; VGM; classical
- Occupations: Composer, orchestrator, music producer
- Years active: 1986–present
- Label: Universal Music Japan
- Website: website

Akira Senju (Japanese: 千住 明, Hepburn: Senju Akira; born 21 October 1960) is a Japanese composer, arranger and conductor.

== Biography ==
Senju studied composition at the Tokyo National University of Fine Arts and Music and received his master's degree with honors. Between 1994 and 2003, he produced series of cover albums Utahime for Japanese singer Akina Nakamori with more than million sold copies overall.

Composition credits include Mama wa Shōgaku 4 Nensei, Mobile Suit Victory Gundam, Rampo, Strawberry on the Shortcake, Yomigaeri, Red Garden, Nada Sōsō, Fūrin Kazan, Fullmetal Alchemist: Brotherhood, Tales of Vesperia: The First Strike, the 2012 revival of Iron Chef, Triangle Strategy and the anime version of Battery. Arrangement credits include Hikari. Performance credits include Handsome Boy, The Snow Queen (Yuki no Joou). His brother is Hiroshi Senju, the Nihonga painter. His younger sister is Mariko Senju, the violinist. His nephew is artificial intelligence entrepreneur Hikari Senju.

== Works ==
=== Anime series ===
- Mama wa Shōgaku 4 Nensei (1992, Nippon TV)
- Mobile Suit Victory Gundam (1993–1994, TV Asahi)
- The Silent Service (1995–1998, OVA)
- B'T X (1996, TBS Television)
- Tetsujin 28-go (2004, TV Tokyo)
- The Snow Queen (2005, NHK General TV)
- Red Garden (2006, TV Asahi)
- Fullmetal Alchemist: Brotherhood (2009–2010, MBS)
- Valvrave the Liberator (2013, MBS)
- Battery (2016, Fuji TV)

=== Film music ===
- Ribbon RE-BORN (1988)
- 226 (1989)
- Tsurumoku Dokushinryō (1991)
- Chibi Maruko-chan: My Favorite Song (1992)
- Tōhō Kenbunroku (The Travels of Marco Polo) (1992)
- Kokōkyōshi (1993)
- Ienakiko (1994)
- The Mystery of Rampo – International version (1995)
- Night Train to the Stars (1996)
- Time Leap (1997)
- Acorn House (1997)
- Begging for Love (1998)
- Gensomaden Saiyuki: Requiem (2001)
- Meshita no koibito (2002)
- Yomigaeri (2003)
- Kurasshu (2003)
- The Man Who Wipes the Mirror (Mirror no Fukuotoko) (2004)
- Tetsujin 28: The Movie (2005)
- Hinokio (2005)
- A Heartful of Love (2005)
- Nada Sōsō (2006)
- Elephant no Senaka（2007年）
- Run with the Wind (2009)
- Magic Tree House (2012)
- Reminiscence (2017)

=== Film music (animation) ===
- Princess Arete (2000) – directed by Sunao Katabuchi
- Tales of Vesperia: The First Strike (2009) – directed by Kanta Kamei

=== Television dramas (selected) ===
- Summer Snow (2000, TBS Television)
- Strawberry on the Shortcake (2001, TBS Television)
- Tetsujin 28-go (2004)
- Suna no Utsuwa (2004)
- Red Garden (2006–2007)
- Fūrin Kazan (NHK, 2007)
- Gold (2010, Fuji TV)
- Japanese Americans (2010, TBS Television) – miniseries

=== Video games ===
- Fighting Illusion: K-1 Grand Prix (1996, Daft Co.)
- Fullmetal Alchemist: Prince of the Dawn (2009, Square Enix)
- Fullmetal Alchemist: Daughter of the Dusk (2009, Square Enix)
- Triangle Strategy (2022, Square Enix-Artdink)

=== Compositions ===
- Sonata for clarinet and piano (1985)
- 歌曲 (Circus) (1986)
- 春光 for shakuhachi, synthesizer and computer (1987)
- 回帰の街f or violin and orchestra (1988)
- Eden for computer (1989)
- Into the Sea for vibraphone and computer (1990)
- Henri's Sky (1991)
- Aria for marimba (1992) – inspired from J. S. Bach
- 彩霧 (Saimu) for violin and string orchestra (1994)
- De Jabu I–IV for solo marimba (1994)
- 聖歌 (Chant) for violin and synthesizer (1997)
- Serenade for solo violin (1997)
- Violin Concerto: Return to the Forest (2000)
- 四季 (Four Seasons) for violin and string orchestra (2004)
- Symphony No. 1 (2005)
- 日本交響詩 (Japan Symphonic Poems) (2005)
- Breath and Rosary for Electone (2006)
- Breath and Rosary for orchestra (2006)
- 隅田川 (Sumidagawa), opera (2007) – libretto: Takashi Matsumoto
- 源氏物語 (The Tale of Genji), Psalm symphony (2008) – libretto: Takashi Matsumoto
- Manyoshu (2009) – libretto: Madoka Mayuzumi
- Andante (2013)
- Waterfall no Shiraito, opera (2014) – libretto: Madoka Mayuzumi
