= Will (Akina Nakamori album) =

Studio album by Akina Nakamori
- Released: 1 December 1999
- Studio: Victor Studio; Towerside Studio; DK Studio
- Genre: J-pop; pop rock; dance-pop
- Length: 52:02
- Language: Japanese
- Label: This One/Gauss Entertainment
- Producer: Kazuhiro Chiba; Ikurō Fujiwara

Akina Nakamori chronology
Spoon (1998)	Will (1999)	Zero Album: Utahime 2 (2002)

Singles from Will
- 1. "Tomadoi" Released: 23 September 1998; 2. "Ophelia" Released: 21 January 1999; 3. "Trust Me" Released: 1 December 1999

Will (stylized as will) is the nineteenth studio album by Japanese singer Akina Nakamori, released on 1 December 1999 by Gauss Entertainment under the This One label. The album includes the three singles "Tomadoi", "Trust Me" and "Ophelia", which peaked in the top 30 on the Oricon Weekly Singles Chart. Will was Nakamori's final album under Gauss.

== Promotion ==
=== Singles ===
"Tomadoi" was released as the lead single from the album on 23 September 1998. The song served as the theme song to the television series 39 Sai no Aki (39歳の秋), and peaked at number 40 on the Oricon Weekly Singles Chart, staying on the chart for two weeks. The song has sold 10,410 copies as of June, 2020.

The second single from the album, "Ophelia" was released on 21 January 1999. The song was the opening theme song of the crime television series Border: Hanzai Shinri Sosa File (ボーダー 犯罪心理捜査ファイル), in which Nakamori appeared as a main role. "Ophelia" was the most successful single from the album, peaking at number 29 in Japan and selling 38,450 copies to date. The song thematizes Ophelia, a character from William Shakespeare's drama Hamlet.

"Trust Me" was released as the third single on 1 December 1999, simultaneously with the album. The single debuted and peaked at number fifty-seven in Japan, becoming her lowest charting single there. "Trust Me" has sold 4,610 copies and was her fewest selling single until "Diva (Single Version)" (2009) had sold only 1,608 copies.

=== Other songs ===
"Tsuki no Bishō" was originally recorded for the soundtrack to the role-playing video game, Wizardry Dimguil: Original Soundtrack (1999). The soundtrack album includes three versions of the song: guitar version, orchestral version, and original karaoke. The guitar version was included on Will as "Tsuki no Bishō (Acoustic Version)".

"Arashi no Naka de", "Genwaku", and "Kisei (Never Forget)" were originally included in Nakamori's eighteenth studio album Spoon. "Kisei (Never Forget)" was the lead single from the album and peaked in the top 20 on the Oricon Weekly Singles Chart, selling 94,870 copies. The remix versions of the songs were included on Will, as "Arashi no Naka de (Misterioso "A")" "Genwaku (Amabile "A")", and "Kisei (Never Forget) [Taste "A" Version]".

== Critical reception ==
Will received generally favorable reviews from critics. CD Journal praised the integrity of the album, saying the production fits the singer's character.

== Chart performance ==
Will debuted and peaked at number fifty-two on the Oricon Weekly Albums Chart and stayed on the chart for only a week, selling 4,870 copies. The album was a commercial failure, remaining as her lowest-charting and worst-selling studio album as of June, 2020.

== Track listing ==
All music is arranged by Ikuro Fujiwara, except where indicated.

No.	Title	Lyrics	Music	Arrangement	Length
1.	"Tobira" (Overture)		Ikuro Fujiwara		1:07
2.	"Garnet"	Chisa Tanabe	Tanabe		4:12
3.	"Trust Me" (All' Espanola)	Seriko Natsuno	Kazuhiro Hara		3:53
4.	"Pretend"	Yukana Nogami	Himeko Yamamoto		4:21
5.	"Arashi no Naka de (嵐の中で)" (Misterioso "A")	Natsuno	Origa	Motoyoshi Iwasaki	4:20
6.	"Genwaku (幻惑)" (Amabile "A")	Natsuno	Akiko Kobayashi	Iwasaki	4:32
7.	"Kisei (Never Forget) (帰省 ～Never Forget～)" (Taste "A" Version)	Yasuhiro Suzu; Atsuko	Suzu		5:57
8.	"Konnanimo... (こんなにも…)"	Atsuko	Katsuki Maeda		5:07
9.	"Tsuki no Hohoemi (月の微笑)" (Acoustic Version)	Natsuno	Natsuno		4:22
10.	"Will"				1:30
11.	"Tomadoi (とまどい)"	Hiromi Mori	Juni	Max Brightstone	3:59
12.	"Ophelia (オフェリア)"	Aki Shimogō	Satoshi Shimano	Masanori Kamide	3:54
13.	"Trust Me" (Secret Track)	Natsuno	Hara
Total length:					52:02

== Covers ==
- Ikurō Fujiwara covered "Yuki no Hana" in his instrumental albums Hana no Densetsu in 2004 and Selection Mon Cheri in 2021; and "Tsuki no Hohoemi" in his 2004 instrumental album Tsuki no Densetsu.

== Release history ==
Region	Date	Format(s)	Distributor(s)	Ref(s).
Japan	1 December 1999	CD	This One	
Japan	3 December 2014	HQCD	Tokuma Japan	
