= Best Finger 25th Anniversary Selection =

Compilation album by Akina Nakamori
- Released: January 11, 2006
- Recorded: 1995–2005
- Studios: Hitokuchizaka Studio; Burnish Stone Recording Studio; Westside Studios
- Genres: J-pop; hard rock; kayōkyoku
- Length: 74:37
- Language: Japanese
- Labels: Utahime Records; Universal Sigma
- Producer: Akina Nakamori

Akina Nakamori chronology
Utahime 3: Shūmaku (2003)	Best Finger 25th Anniversary Selection (2006)	Destination (2006)

Singles from Best Finger 25th Anniversary Selection
- 1. "Akai Hana" Released: May 12, 2004; 2. "Hajimete Deatta Hi no Yō ni" Released: July 7, 2004; 3. "Rakka Ryūsui" Released: December 7, 2005

Best Finger 25th Anniversary Selection (ベスト・フィンガー~中森明菜25周年記念セレクション, Besuto Fingā ~ Nakamori Akina 25 Shūnenkinen Serekushon) is a compilation album by Japanese entertainer Akina Nakamori, released through Utahime Records and Universal Sigma on January 11, 2006 to commemorate Nakamori's 25th anniversary. The album consists of the singles "Akai Hana", "Hajimete Deatta Hi no Yō ni", and "Rakka Ryūsui", plus self-covers of her classic singles from the Warner Pioneer era.

== Background ==
The album cover features Nakamori's handprint. The first edition of the album was available in five different colors.

To commemorate Nakamori's 25th anniversary, Universal Sigma launched a mobile phone campaign from January 11 to 24. Fans sent messages to Nakamori's hotline; the winning messages were selected to be read by Nakamori herself, and campaign winners received autographed goods.

== Chart performance ==
The album peaked at No. 29 on Oricon's weekly albums chart and charted for eight weeks. It sold over 16,000 copies.

== Track listing ==
No.	Title	Lyrics	Music	Arrangement	Length
1.	"Rakka Ryūsui" ((落花流水; "Falling Flower Running Water"))	Takashi Matsumoto	Kenji Hayashida	Masayuki Sakamoto	4:07
2.	"Slow Motion [True Album Akina 95 Best Version]" (Surō Mōshon (スローモーション))	Etsuko Kisugi	Takao Kisugi	Ikurō Fujiwara	5:11
3.	"Desire (Jōnetsu) [2005 Version]" ((DESIRE -情熱-))	Yoko Aki	Kisaburō Suzuki	Hiroshi Uesugi	4:23
4.	"Shōjo A [2005 Version]" ((少女A; "Girl A"))	Masao Urino	Hiroaki Serizawa	Uesugi	3:33
5.	"Hajimete Deatta Hi no Yō ni" ((初めて出逢った日のように; "Like the Day I First Met You"))	Kim Hyung-seok; Gorō Matsui	Kim	Satoshi Takebe	4:28
6.	"Kita Wing [2005 Version]" (Kita Uingu (北ウイング; "North Wing"))	Chinfa Kan	Tetsuji Hayashi	Uesugi	4:44
7.	"Jukkai (1984) [2005 Version]" ((十戒 (1984); "Ten Commandments (1984)"))	Masao Urino	Masayoshi Takanaka	Uesugi	3:31
8.	"Days"	Akina Nakamori	Tetsurō Oda	Takebe	4:57
9.	"Meu amor é... [True Album Akina 95 Best Version]" (Mi Amōre (ミ・アモーレ))	Kan	Naoya Matsuoka	Fujiwara	4:23
10.	"Tattoo [True Album Akina 95 Best Version]"	Yuri Moriko	Anri Sekine	Kōichi Korenaga	4:01
11.	"½ no Shinwa [2005 Version]" (Nibun no Ichi no Shinwa (1/2の神話; "Half the Myth"))	Masao Urino	Yoshiyuki Ohsawa	Uesugi	3:22
12.	"Nanpasen [True Album Akina 95 Best Version]" ((難破船; "Shipwreck"))	Tokiko Kato	Kato	Masahiro Sayama	4:06
13.	"Akai Hana" ((赤い花; "Red Flower"))	Kim; Minako Kawae	Kim	Takebe	5:28
14.	"The Heat (Musica Fiesta)"	Adya	Uru	Uru	4:10
15.	"Tango Noir [True Album Akina 95 Best Version]"	Kayoko Fuyumori	Takashi Tsushimi	Fujiwara	4:31
16.	"Kazari ja Nai no yo Namida wa [Utahime Double Decade Version]" ((飾りじゃないのよ涙は; "The Tears Are Not a Decoration"))	Yōsui Inoue	Y. Inoue	Yōichi Murata	4:27
17.	"Hana" ((華 -HANA-; "Flower"))	Seriko Natsuno	Hidekazu Uchiike	Yūji Toriyama	4:46
Total length:					74:37

== Charts ==
Chart (2006)	Peak position
Japanese Albums (Oricon)	29
