= Spoon (album) =

Studio album by Akina Nakamori
- Released: 17 June 1998
- Recorded: 1998
- Genre: J-pop
- Length: 53:06
- Language: Japanese
- Label: This One/Gauss Entertainment
- Producer: Akina Nakamori

Akina Nakamori chronology
Shaker (1997)	Spoon (1998)	Will (1999)

Singles from Spoon
- 1. "Kisei (Never Forget)" Released: 11 February 1998; 2. "Kon'ya, Nagareboshi" Released: 21 May 1998

Spoon is the eighteenth studio album by Japanese singer-producer Akina Nakamori. And fourth studio album to be released during 1990's. It was released on 17 June 1998 by Gauss Entertainment. The album includes lead singles "Kisei (Never Forget)" and "Kon'ya, Nagareboshi". It was Nakamori's first album released under the This One label of Gauss Entertainment.

The second album released in Gauss, Will (1999) was produced by chief of the Gauss Entertainment recording label, Kazuhiro Chiba. It's considered as an unofficial album, since it isn't included in the official website until 2024 and it was produced without Nakamori's approval. In December 1998, on the special press-con, said about Nakamori's existence as a troublemaker, who shouldn't exist in the music industry. In the end of press-con was announced contract cancelation scheduled on the December 1999.

== Promotion ==
=== Singles ===
It consists of two previously released singles.

Kisei: Never Forget is the thirty-fifth single written by Yasuhiro Suzu and arranged by Akira Senju. It was released on 12 February 1998. It was her first single to be released in that year. The single was promoted as a theme song to the Japanese television drama Tsumetai Tsuki, in which Nakamori starred a main role for the first time in 6 years. The single was included in the compilation album Utahime Densetsu: 90's Best. The single debuted at number 19 on the Oricon Single Weekly Charts. in 2005, the single has received renewed arrangement in ballad compilation album Ballad Best 25th Anniversary Selection.

Kon'ya, Nagareboshi is the thirty-sixth single written by Keiko Utsumi and Seriko Natsuno. It was released on 21 May 1998, it was her second single to be released in that year. The single was included in the compilation album Utahime Densetsu: 90's Best. The single debuted at number 66 on the Oricon Single Weekly Charts.

== Stage performances ==
The album tracks Your Birthday, Rakuen no Megami, Genwaku, Konya, Nagare Hoshi, Oishii Mizu and Akai Bara ga Yureta has been performed once in the live tour Spoon in 1998.

Arashi no Naka de and has been performed in live tour Spoon and acoustic live tour 21 Seiki no Tabidachi he in 2000.

Ame no Hi wa Ningyo has been performed only in acoustic live tour 21 Seiki no Tabidachi he.

Kisei (Never Forget) has been performed in the live tour Spoon, symphonic concert in 1998, acoustic live tour 21 Seiki no Tabidachi he and live tour Music Fiesta in 2002.

== Chart performance ==
The album reached number 17 on the Oricon Weekly Albums Chart, charting for 3 consecutive weeks with sales of 22,800 copies.

== Track listing ==
No.	Title	Lyrics	Music	Arranger(s)	Length
1.	"Your Birthday"	Seriko Natsuno	Origa	Yang Bang-ean	4:51
2.	"Ame no Hi wa Ningyo (雨の日は人魚)"	Natsuno	Hiroyuki Matsuda	Miyabi Shirakawa	4:36
3.	"Rakuen no Megami (楽園の女神)"	Satake Masaru	Shiroma Albert	Ikurō Fujiwara	4:38
4.	"Kon'ya, Nagareboshi (今夜、流れ星)"	Natsuno	Keiko Utsumi	Shirakawa	5:43
5.	"Kisei (Never Forget) (帰省)"	Atsuko, Yasuhiro Suzu	Suzu	Akira Senju	5:33
6.	"Shukufuku (祝福)"	Ryoji Sonoda	Albert	Fujiwara	5:03
7.	"Yuki no Hana: White X'mas"	Natsuno	Fujiwara	Fujiwara	5:04
8.	"Arashi no Naka de (嵐の中で)"	Natsuno	Origa	Ryō Kunihiko	4:18
9.	"Genwaku (幻惑)"	Natsuno	Akiko Kobayashi	Fujiwara	5:02
10.	"Blowing From The Sun"	Natsuno	Origa	Fujiwara, Shirakawa	4:51
11.	"Hana Kumori (花曇り)"	Natsuno	Origa	Kunihiko	4:29
