= Paraborne Aviation =

American aircraft manufacturer

- Company type: Private company
- Industry: Aerospace
- Fate: Out of business circa 2004
- Key people: Scott Alan
- Products: paramotors

Paraborne Aviation was an American aircraft manufacturer based in Kissimmee, Florida. Founded by Scott Alan, the company specialized in the design and manufacture of paramotors.

Paraborne started off as the US distributor for the Goodwin Buckshot wheeled powered parachute design and the Daiichi Kosho Company's foot-launched Beat and Whisper paramotors. When Daiichi Kosho ceased production Alan designed his own derivative aircraft, the Paraborne Backplane, but it was not a commercial success and Paraborne ceased produced and went out of business in about 2004.

== Aircraft ==
Summary of aircraft built by Paraborne Aviation
Model name	First flight	Number built	Type
Paraborne Backplane	1999		Paramotor
