= Trust Me (Akina Nakamori song) =

Single by Akina Nakamori

from the album Will
- Language: Japanese
- B-side: "Yuki no Hana: White Christmas (Chamber Music Version)"
- Released: December 1, 1999
- Recorded: 1998
- Genre: J-pop; dance-pop
- Length: 4:24
- Label: This One/Gauss Entertainment
- Composer: Kazuhiro Hara
- Lyricist: Seriko Natsuno

Akina Nakamori singles chronology
"Ophelia" (1999)	"Trust Me" (1999)	"It's Brand New Day" (2001)

"Trust Me" (トラスト・ミー, Torasuto Mī) is the 39th single by Japanese entertainer Akina Nakamori. Written by Seriko Natsuno and Kazuhiro Hara, the single was released on December 1, 1999, by Gauss Entertainment under the This One label. It was also the third single from her 19th studio album Will. This was Nakamori's final single under Gauss Entertainment.

The single peaked at No. 57 on Oricon's weekly singles chart and sold over 4,600 copies, becoming Nakamori's first single to sell less than 10,000 copies.

== Track listing ==
All lyrics are written by Seriko Natsuno; all music is arranged by Ikurō Fujiwara.

Original release
No.	Title	Music	Length
1.	"Trust Me"	Kazuhiro Hara	4:24
2.	"Yuki no Hana: White Christmas (Chamber Music Version)" ((雪の花 〜White X'mas〜 (chamber music version); "Snow Flower: White Christmas"))	Fujiwara	6:12
3.	"Trust Me" (Voiceless Version)		4:24
4.	"Yuki no Hana: White Christmas" (Voiceless Version)		6:10
Total length:			21:10

== Charts ==
Chart (1999)	Peak position
Japan (Oricon)	57

== Covers ==
- Ikurō Fujiwara covered "Yuki no Hana" in his instrumental albums Hana no Densetsu in 2004 and Selection Mon Cheri in 2021.
