= Paraborne Backplane =

American paramotor

Backplane

General information
- Type: Paramotor
- National origin: United States
- Manufacturer: Paraborne Aviation
- Designer: Scott Alan
- Status: Production completed

History
- Manufactured: circa 1999-2004
- Introduction date: circa 1999
- Developed from: Daiichi Kosho Whisper

The Paraborne Backplane is an American paramotor that was designed by Scott Alan and produced by Paraborne Aviation of Kissimmee, Florida for powered paragliding.

== Design and development ==
As production of the Daiichi Kosho Whisper, for which Paraborne acted as US distributor, came to a close, the company developed its own derivative design, replacing the Daiichi Kosho DK 472 engine with a Hirth powerplant of similar output.

The Backplane was designed to comply with the US FAR 103 Ultralight Vehicles rules. It features a paraglider-style high wing, single-place accommodation and a single 22 hp (16 kW) Hirth F-33 engine in pusher configuration. Original factory canopy options included the Ranger or the Seal designs. As is the case with all paramotors, takeoff and landing is accomplished on foot.

The aircraft was not a commercial success, production was halted and the company went out of business in about 2004.

== Specifications (Backplane) ==
Data from Cliche

General characteristics

- Crew: one
- Wing area: 340 sq ft (32 m^{2})
- Empty weight: 42 lb (19 kg)
- Gross weight: 260 lb (118 kg)
- Fuel capacity: 3 U.S. gallons (11 L; 2.5 imp gal)
- Powerplant: 1 × Hirth F-33 single cylinder, two-stroke, air-cooled aircraft engine, 22 hp (16 kW)
- Propellers: 3-bladed ground adjustable, carbon fiber

Performance

- Cruise speed: 25 mph (40 km/h, 22 kn)
- Rate of climb: 400 ft/min (2.0 m/s)
