= Tomadoi =

Single by Akina Nakamori

from the album Will
- Language: Japanese
- English title: Bewildered
- B-side: "Good-bye My Tears"
- Released: September 23, 1998
- Recorded: 1998
- Genre: J-pop; pop rock
- Length: 3:59
- Label: This One/Gauss Entertainment
- Composer: Juni
- Lyricist: Hiromi Mori

Akina Nakamori singles chronology
"Kon'ya, Nagareboshi" (1998)	"Tomadoi" (1998)	"Ophelia" (1999)

"Tomadoi" (とまどい; lit. "Bewildered") is the 37th single by Japanese entertainer Akina Nakamori. Written by Hiromi Mori and Juni, the single was released on September 23, 1998, by Gauss Entertainment under the This One label. It was also the lead single from her 19th studio album Will.

== Background ==
"Tomadoi" was used as the theme song of the TBS drama series Kao Ai no Gekijō: 39-sai no Aki (花王愛の劇場 39歳の秋; lit. Kao Love Theater: The 39-year Autumn). The B-side, "Good-bye My Tears", was used as the theme song of the TBS drama series Shichinin no OL no Somellier (七人のOLソムリエ; lit. Seven Office Lady Sommeliers).

== Chart performance ==
"Tomadoi" peaked at No. 40 on Oricon's weekly singles chart and sold over 10,400 copies.

== Track listing ==
All music is arranged by Max Brightstone.

Original release
No.	Title	Lyrics	Music	Length
1.	"Tomadoi" ((とまどい; "Bewildered"))	Hiromi Mori	Juni	3:59
2.	"Good-bye My Tears"	Nobuko Hokari	Rika Hanno	4:25
3.	"Tomadoi" (Instrumental)			3:59
Total length:				12:31

== Charts ==
Chart (1998)	Peak position
Japan (Oricon)	40
