= Destination (Akina Nakamori album) =

Studio album by Akina Nakamori
- Released: 21 June 2006
- Recorded: 2005–2006
- Studio: West Side; Ichiguchizaka Studio; Zak Studio; On-Air Mafu Studio blue velvet studio
- Genre: Latin, Pop
- Length: 52:20
- Language: Japanese
- Label: Universal Music Japan
- Producer: Akira Terabayashi; Takashi Kadomura

Akina Nakamori chronology
Best Finger 25th Anniversary Selection (2006)	Destination (2006)	Utahime Best 25th Anniversary Selection (2007)

Singles from Destination
- 1. "Hana yo Odore" Released: 17 May 2006

Destination (stylized as DESTINATION) is the twenty second studio album by Japanese singer-songwriter Akina Nakamori and third studio album to be released during the 2000s. It was released on 21 June 2006 under the Universal Music Japan label.

The album includes two Akina's original written songs: Yoru no Hana and Love Gate under pseudonym Miran:Miran.

The album jacket is taken from live pamphlet Femme Fatale in 1988.

== Promotion ==
=== Singles ===
It consists of two previously released singles.

Rakka Ryūsui is the forty fifth single written by Takashi Matsumoto and Kenji Hayashida. It was released on 7 December 2005 under Universal Music Japan. It was her only single to be released in that year and first single to be released in 3 years. It was used as a theme song to the new-year historical television drama Tenka Sōran: Tokugawa Mitsuyo no inbō. The original version of the single was included in the compilation albums BEST FINGER 25th anniversary selection and All Time Best: Originals in 2014.

The single debuted at number 43 on Oricon Single Weekly Charts.

"Hana yo Odore" is the forty sixth single written by Hitoshi Haba. It was released on 17 May 2006 under Universal Music Japan. It was her only single to be released in that year and first single to be released in 3 years. The single was used as a theme song to the television drama series Primadam, in which Nakamori was cast in the minor role. The single version of the single was included in the compilation album All Time Best: Originals in 2014.

The single debuted at number 23 on Oricon Single Weekly Charts.

== Stage performances ==
Nakamori performed Hana yo Odore, Game, Rakka Ryuusei, Love Gate, Kouya, Nemureru Mori no Cho, Grace Rain and Usotsuki in her final live tour Last Destination in 2006.

== Chart performance ==
The album reached number 20 on the Oricon Album Weekly Chart charted for the 4 consecutive weeks with the sales of 10,300 copies. During its re-release in 2023, the album debut at number 65 on the Billboard Japan´s Album Weekly charts.

== Track listing ==
Destination track listing
No.	Title	Lyrics	Music	Arranger	Length
1.	"Kouya: Beniyo"	Momoko Hayashi	Kenji Hayashida	Yusuke Sasaki	4:10
2.	"Usotsuki"	Minako Kawae	Kotaro Egami	Sasaki	4:06
3.	"Seashore"	Adya	Shouichirou Hirata	Sasaki	5:02
4.	"Nemureru Mori no Chou"	Kawae	Egami	Sasaki	4:08
5.	"Kodou"	Nancha Ri	Yoko Noi	Sasaki	4:35
6.	"Game" (album version)	Shu Kudo	Kenji Hayashida	Hiroshi Uesugi/Hayashida	5:14
7.	"Yoru no Hana"	Ri/Miran Miran	Nao Tanaka	Sasaki	3:53
8.	"Hana yo Odore" (album version)	Karen	Hitoshi Haba	Uesugi	4:18
9.	"Love Gate"	Rie/Miran:Miran	Rie	Sasaki	3:24
10.	"Rakka Ryūsui" (album version)	Takashi Matsumoto	Hayashida	Masayuki Sakamoto	4:43
11.	"Only You"	Rie	Rie	Sasaki	3:44
12.	"Grace Rain"	Rie	Rie	URU	4:53
Total length:					52:20

== Release history ==
Year	Format(s)	Serial number	Label(s)	Ref.
2006	CD	UMCK-1209	UMJ	
2017	UHQCD	UPCH-7275	UMJ	
2023	LP, CD	UPCY-7841, UPJY-9350	UMJ	
