= Ophelia (Akina Nakamori song) =

Single by Akina Nakamori

from the album Will
- Language: Japanese
- B-side: "To Be"
- Released: January 21, 1999
- Recorded: 1998
- Genre: J-pop; dance-pop
- Length: 4:20
- Label: This One/Gauss Entertainment
- Composer: Satoshi Shimano
- Lyricist: Aki Shimogō

Akina Nakamori singles chronology
"Kon'ya, Nagareboshi" (1998)	"Ophelia" (1999)	"Trust Me" (1999)

"Ophelia" (オフェリア, Oferia) is the 38th single by Japanese entertainer Akina Nakamori. Written by Aki Shimogō and Satoshi Shimano, the single was released on January 21, 1999, by Gauss Entertainment under the This One label. It was also the second single from her 19th studio album Will.

== Background ==
"Ophelia" was used as the theme song of the NTV/YTV drama series Border Hanzai Shinri Sōsa File (ボーダー 犯罪心理捜査ファイル, Bōdā Hanzai Shinri Sōsa Fairu; lit. Border Criminal Psychological Investigation Files), which also starred Nakamori. The B-side is the English-language song "To Be".

== Chart performance ==
"Ophelia" peaked at No. 29 on Oricon's weekly singles chart and sold over 38,500 copies.

== Track listing ==
All music is composed by Satoshi Shimano; all music is arranged by Masanori Kamide.

Original release
No.	Title	Lyrics	Length
1.	"Ophelia" (Oferia (オフェリア))	Aki Shimogō	4:20
2.	"To Be"	Suzi Kim	7:30
3.	"Ophelia" (Instrumental)		4:20
Total length:			16:09

== Charts ==
Chart (1999)	Peak position
Japan (Oricon)	29
