= It's Brand New Day =

Single by Akina Nakamori

from the album Resonancia
- Language: Japanese
- B-side: "Stay in Love"
- Released: May 31, 2001
- Recorded: 2001
- Studio: Be Born Studio
- Genre: J-pop; R&B
- Length: 4:52
- Label: @ease
- Songwriter: Adya
- Producer: Uru

Akina Nakamori singles chronology
"Trust Me" (1999)	"It's Brand New Day" (2001)	"The Heat (Musica Fiesta)" (2002)

"It's Brand New Day" is the 40th single by Japanese entertainer Akina Nakamori. Written by Adya, the single was released on May 31, 2001, by the independent label @ease.

== Background ==
"It's Brand New Day" was Nakamori's first release in nearly two years, after her falling-out with Gauss Entertainment (which has since been absorbed into Tokuma Shoten in 2005) in December 1999. The single was initially released exclusively online on Nifty Corporation's website Music@nifty (currently @niftymusic), but it was later made available on CD during the concert tour All About Akina: 20th Anniversary It's Brand New Day from June 6 to July 13, 2001. On August 8, the CD version was made available at Music@nifty. In 2002, Nakamori signed with Universal Music Japan, and "It's Brand New Day" was included on her 20th studio album Resonancia.

As it was not widely released, "It's Brand New Day" became Nakamori's first single to not appear on Oricon's weekly singles chart.

== Track listing ==
All lyrics are written by Adya; all music is arranged by Uru.

Original release
No.	Title	Music	Length
1.	"It's Brand New Day"	Adya	4:52
2.	"Stay in Love"	Uru	5:06
3.	"It's Brand New Day" (Instrumental)		4:51
4.	"Stay in Love" (Instrumental)		5:07
Total length:			19:56
