= Ballad Best 25th Anniversary Selection =

Compilation album by Akina Nakamori
- Released: March 28, 2007
- Recorded: 1995–2007
- Studios: Sound City Studio; Westside Studios
- Genres: J-pop; kayōkyoku
- Length: 71:38
- Language: Japanese
- Labels: Utahime Records; Universal Sigma
- Producer: Akina Nakamori

Akina Nakamori chronology
Utahime Best 25th Anniversary Selection (2007)	Ballad Best 25th Anniversary Selection (2007)	Enka (2007)

Ballad Best 25th Anniversary Selection (バラード・ベスト 〜25th Anniversary Selection〜, Bareedo Besuto ~ 25 Shūnenkinen Serekushon) is a compilation album by Japanese entertainer Akina Nakamori, released through Utahime Records and Universal Sigma on March 28, 2007, as a third compilation album to commemorate Nakamori's 25th anniversary.

== Background ==
The album consists of the newly recorded song "Ano Natsu no Hi", self-covers of her classic singles from the Warner Pioneer, MRA and UMJ era recorded between 1995 and 2005. The album was released in 2 editions: regular with solo CD and limited CD+DVD. DVD contains previously unreleased footage of live concert Milkyway in 1983.

== Chart performance ==
The album peaked at No. 13 on Oricon's weekly albums chart and charted for eight weeks. It sold over 26,000 copies.

== Track listing ==
No.	Title	Lyrics	Music	Arrangement	Length
1.	"Nanpasen [2007 Version]" (難破船)	Tokiko Kato	Kato	Hiroshi Uesugi	4:27
2.	"Second Love [Utahime Double-decade Version]" (セカンド・ラブ)	Etsuko Kisugi	Takao Kisugi	Satoshi Takebe	4:43
3.	"Ano Natsu no Hi" (あの夏の日)	Eriko	Jun Ichikawa	Ichikawa	4:40
4.	"Liar (Akina Nakamori song) [True Album Akina 95 Best Version]"	Masao Urino	Hiroaki Serizawa	Minoru Mukaiya	4:53
5.	"Mizu ni Sashita Hana [Utahime Double-Decade Version]" (水に挿した花)	Natsumi Tadano	Junko Hirotani	Takebe	4:28
6.	"Kagerō" (陽炎)	Nakamori	Hiroshi Tamaki	Yūji Toriyama	4:44
7.	"Akai Hana" (赤い花)	Kim Hyung-seok; Minako Kawae	Kim	Takebe	5:28
8.	"Sand Beige (Sabaku e) [Utahime Double-Decade Version]"	Eiko Kyō	Takashi Tsushimi	Akira Senju	4:42
9.	"Solitude [2007 ver.]"	Reiko Yukawa	Yukihide Takekawa	Uesugi	4:42
10.	"Futari Shizuka [True Album Akina 95 Best Version]"	Takashi Matsumoto	Makoto Sekiguchi	Mukaiya	4:06
11.	"Gekka" (月華)	Gorō Matsui	Shūgō Kajiwara	Akihiko Matsumoto	5:01
12.	"Yokan [True Album Akina 95 Best Version]" (予感)	Ryō Asuka	Asuka	Nobuhiko Kashiwara	4:27
13.	"Hajimete Deatta Hi no Yō ni" (初めて出逢った日のように)	Kim; Matsui	Kim	Satoshi Takebe	4:28
14.	"Eki [Utahime Double-Decade Version]" (駅)	Mariya Takeuchi	Takeuchi	Senju	4:42
15.	"Kisei (Never Forget) [2007 ver.]" (帰省)	Yasuhiro Suzu; Atsuko	Suzu	Uesugi	5:42
Total length:					71:38

== Charts ==
Chart (2007)	Peak position
Japanese Albums (Oricon)	13
