= Appetite (Akina Nakamori song) =

Single by Akina Nakamori

from the album Shaker
- Language: Japanese
- B-side: "Sweet Suspicion"
- Released: February 21, 1997
- Recorded: 1996
- Genre: J-pop; R&B
- Length: 5:18
- Label: MCA Victor
- Composer: U-ki
- Lyricist: Seriko Natsuno
- Producer: Akina Nakamori

Akina Nakamori singles chronology
"Moonlight Shadow: Tsuki ni Hoero" (1996)	"Appetite" (1997)	"Kisei (Never Forget)" (1998)

"Appetite" (アペタイト, Apetaito) is the 34th single by Japanese entertainer Akina Nakamori. Written by Seriko Natsuno and U-ki, the single was released on February 21, 1997, by MCA Victor. It was also the second single from her 17th studio album Shaker. This was Nakamori's final single under MCA Victor before signing with Gauss Entertainment (a subsidiary of Daiichikosho) a year later.

The single peaked at No. 46 on Oricon's weekly singles chart and sold over 29,400 copies, becoming her lowest-charting and lowest-selling single at the time.

== Track listing ==
Original release
No.	Title	Lyrics	Music	Arrangement	Length
1.	"Appetite"	Seriko Natsuno	U-ki	U-ki	5:18
2.	"Sweet Suspicion"	Kanon Kuwa	Hitoshi Chizawa	Itaru Sakota	4:54
3.	"Appetite" (Original Karaoke)				5:17
4.	"Sweet Suspicion" (Original Karaoke)				4:52
Total length:					20:21

== Charts ==
Chart (1997)	Peak position
Japan (Oricon)	46
