= List of Cat's Eye episodes =

Cat's Eye (キャッツ♥アイ, Kyattsu Ai; stylized as CAT'S♥EYE) is a Japanese manga series written and illustrated by Tsukasa Hojo. It was serialized in Weekly Shōnen Jump from 1981 to 1985, and collected into 18 tankōbon by Shueisha. The story follows the adventures of the three Kisugi sisters, Hitomi, Rui and Ai, who are art thieves trying to collect all the works belonging to their missing father.

Cat's Eye was adapted into an anime series by Tokyo Movie Shinsha and directed by Yoshio Takeuchi. thirty-six episodes were broadcast between July 11, 1983, until March 26, 1984. The opening theme "Cat's Eye" and the ending theme "Dancing with the Sunshine" were both sung by Anri.

A second series was later produced that ran for thirty-seven episodes from October 8, 1984, until July 8, 1985. The opening and the ending themes were by Mariko Tone.

For the 30th anniversary of the anime, the series was released in Japan on Blu-ray format from a new transfer. Two boxsets, one for each series were published by King Records on March 13, 2013. The boxset for the second series came with a DVD-ROM of animation artwork.

On April 16, 2007, ImaginAsian announced that they would broadcast the first season of Cat's Eye on ImaginAsian TV, and would thereafter give the series its first North American home video release, which happened in September 2007. The show began broadcasting in June of that year, with the first DVD released later that September. As of August 2008, it is currently unavailable. However, ImaginAsian still hold the license and is working to someday re-release the series. At Anime Expo 2013, Right Stuf Inc. announced that they had licensed the series and will release it on DVD under their Nozomi label. In November 2015 the series was added to the Crunchyroll streaming service. On December 13, 2021, Discotek Media announced that they have licensed Cat's Eye for Blu-ray release in North America. with the complete first season being released on April 26, 2022.

== 1983 series ==
=== Season 1 ===
No. overall	No. in season	Title	Directed by	Written by	Original release date
1	1	"You're a Sexy Thief"; Transliteration: "Kimi wa sekushīna dorobō" (Japanese: 君はセクシーな泥棒)	Yoshio Takeuchi	Keisuke Fujikawa	July 11, 1983
After Cat's Eye pull a heist and evade Toshi's efforts to capture them yet again, Kacho gives him an ultimatum. With his career as a police officer at stake, Toshi vows to put romance and marriage on hold until he apprehends Cat's Eye. Even though Hitomi sympathizes with Toshio's predicament and is affected by it, to get back all of their father's art collection is the only way for the Kisugi sisters to figure out the mystery of his disappearance.
2	2	"Welcome to the Police"; Transliteration: "Youkoso keisatsu e" (Japanese: ようこそ警察へ)	Hiroshi Fukutomi	Keisuke Fujikawa	July 18, 1983
Kagawa Shunzo, a private collector who claims to have a painting that Cat's Eye might steal, asks Toshio for help but is found dead thereafter. Cat's Eye become the chief suspect of his murder. With Nagaishi's help, the Kisugi sisters must do what it takes to clear Cat's Eye's name and reputation.
3	3	"Be Careful of the Mini-Devil"; Transliteration: "Urusai shōakuma ni goyōshin" (Japanese: うるさい小悪魔にご用心)	Yoshio Takeuchi	Tomoko Konparu; Hideo Takayashiki	July 25, 1983
While guarding an emerald targeted by Cat's Eye, Toshio discovers by accident that his nemesis is in fact a woman. As a rattled Hitomi makes her escape, Kazumi, member of a newspaper club at Ai's school, catches her flight on camera. Ai frantically tries to stop the film from being developed but fails. While Cat's Eye finalizes their plans to steal the emerald, Kazumi pursues her suspicions. The Kisugi sisters must therefore outwit Toshio and Kazumi to keep their identity from being exposed.
4	4	"The Challenger Smells Like Paris"; Transliteration: "Chōsen-sha (Charenjā) wa Pari no nioi" (Japanese: 挑戦者（チャレンジャー）はパリの匂い)	Directed by : Yoshio Takeuchi; Storyboarded by : Masaharu Okuwaki	Hideo Takayashiki	August 1, 1983
Lupin's Bride, a rival thief from Paris, arrives and challenges Cat's Eye by targeting the same art pieces. The Kisugi sisters must outsmart Lupin's Bride and evade the traps the Inunari Precinct has devised in order to prevent some of their father's art collection from being taken out of the country.
5	5	"Night Flight Is a Dangerous Scent"; Transliteration: "Yakan hikō wa kiken'na kaori" (Japanese: 夜間飛行は危険な香り)	Directed by : Yoshio Takeuchi; Storyboarded by : Kenji Kodama	Atsushi Yamatoya	August 8, 1983
Mitsuko Asatani, an assistant inspector from Tokyo Police HQ, has been assigned to Inunari Precinct as Toshio's partner, but she suspects him as the source of security information leaks. She also suspects Hitomi because of the perfume she uses. Meanwhile, Kacho undergoes treatment because of stress. Under surveillance from all sides, the Kisugi sisters must devise a way to outsmart Toshio's new partner and steal "Sunset of Rhine" at the same time.
6	6	"Feeling a Bit Like Lovers"; Transliteration: "Chotto dake koibito kibun" (Japanese: ちょっとだけ恋人気分)	Hiroshi Fukutomi	Keisuke Fujikawa	August 15, 1983
Cat's Eye sends a note about the "Orlean", a painting displayed in the South Beach Museum. Toshio is sent over to oversee its security and meets Hitomi there. Hitomi is disappointed at the lack of progress in their relationship because of his dedication to his job. Rui then steps in to help Toshio realize what is missing.
7	7	"Make the Love Sign Glamorous"; Transliteration: "Rabusain wa hanayaka ni" (Japanese: ラブサインは華やかに)	Shunji Oga	Tomoko Konparu	August 22, 1983
Because a series of bombings are keeping Toshio occupied, Hitomi only gets to spend two hours with him before he is taken away again by Asatani, which makes her slightly jealous. Seeing her brood over the situation, Rui decides to cancel the plan for their next heist and make preparations for Hitomi's birthday instead. When the bomber is cornered and makes his last stand in the building that houses important paintings, Cat's Eye gives the Inunari Precinct the help they needed in order to capture the perpetrator. Toshio shows Hitomi how much he loves her using the building they have just saved.
8	8	"Far and Away Tottoccino"; Transliteration: "Harukanaru Tottochīno" (Japanese: 遥かなるトットチーノ)	Hiroshi Fukutomi	Atsushi Yamatoya	August 29, 1983
Cat's Eye targets the other half of a diptych which, when paired with the other panel, will allegedly expose a secret of the Medici family. When the painting falls into the hands of a hitman who possesses diplomatic immunity, and even at the risk of provoking a war, Toshio sneaks into the ambassador's residence to retrieve the painting, so Cat's Eye has no choice but to keep a close eye on him.
9	9	"A Very Strange Chase"; Transliteration: "Tottomo okashina dai tsuiseki" (Japanese: とってもおかしな大追跡)	Masaharu Okuwaki	Toshimichi Okawa	September 5, 1983
A date gone awry causes Hitomi to be mad at Toshio. Soon afterwards, Cat's Eye is forced to speed up their latest plan after a mafia boss takes an interest in their next target, "The Woman with the Red Hat". Toshio devises a plan to protect the painting from Cat's Eye by stealing it first, but during the subsequent chase an accident causes Toshio and Hitomi to fall into a dry abandoned well in the forest. Because they both end up injured (Hitomi with a twisted ankle, and Toshio with concussion-induced blindness), the two of them have to work together to make their way out.
10	10	"Do You Like Dog Food?"; Transliteration: "Doggufūdo wa o suki?" (Japanese: ドッグフードはお好き)	Shunji Oga	Kenji Terada	September 12, 1983
Toshio goes undercover during an exhibit of famous paintings sponsored by department store tycoon Gosuke Yabuki, but his cover is blown when Ai appears and questions the authenticity of the exhibits. The Chief brings Toshio over to Yabuki's house to offer an apology, where Toshio discovers a spiked armor for Dobermans but is attacked and has to be hospitalized before discovering more. Ai is sent to Yabuki's house as an advance party while Hitomi and Rui guard Toshio at the hospital. But dodging murderous Dobermans and stealing the "Goddess of Mars" are not the only issues Cat's Eye has to resolve in this case.
11	11	"Dangerous American Temptation" (Japanese: アメリカの危険な誘惑)	Yoshio Takeuchi	Keisuke Fujikawa	September 19, 1983
While on an undercover mission with Toshio to a secret hotel casino, allegedly operated by a mafia affiliate, Hitomi recognizes a painting from their father's art collection believed to be long lost. Hitomi accepts a challenge to a game of roulette on the condition of being awarded the painting "The Dangerous Woman". However, the owner of the casino is not willing to give up their most priced possession so easily; and for that, Hitomi - along with Toshio, who was captured while snooping - must travel to Guam to challenge the owner on their own ground.
12	12	"Brilliant European Temptations"; Transliteration: "Europa no karei na yuuwaku" (Japanese: ヨーロッパの華麗な誘惑)	Shunji Oga	Keisuke Fujikawa	September 26, 1983
While Hitomi waits for her encounter with the casino owner, Rui infiltrates the Queen Sherazard, the owner's casino ship, to gather intel and get into an advantageous position to aid her sister. However, the owner is not the person Cat's Eye has expected to meet, and so the three sisters end up in yet another scuffle for both "The Dangerous Woman" and Toshio's freedom.
13	13	"Don't Go, My Love"; Transliteration: "Ikanaide watashi no koi" (Japanese: 行かないで私の恋)	Kenji Kodama	Tomoko Konparu	October 10, 1983
Toshio decides to take the assistant police inspector test. Passing would result in a higher salary and a temporary transfer meant for career advancement, which will give him a chance to finally settle down. With so many good things to look forward to, there is no doubt that Hitomi will accept his proposal. However, can either Hitomi or Toshio truly take this step that would change their lives forever?
14	14	"The Ransom for Cleopatra"; Transliteration: "Cleopatra no minoshirokin" (Japanese: クレオパトラの身代金)	Hiroshi Fukutomi	Toshimichi Okawa	October 17, 1983
Toshio and Asatani are asked to protect "Cleopatra's Tear, a priceless gem alleged to be Cat's Eye's next target, but are kidnapped while transporting it to Inunari Precinct. A huge ransom is soon demanded for their and the gem's release. The Chief prepares fake bills but does not anticipate a demand for the money to transferred electronically to a Swiss Bank account. Because the Inunari Precinct is debilitated without its ace detectives, Cat's Eye steps in to help in their rescue.
15	15	"Leotard in Midnight"; Transliteration: "Mayonaka ni tobe leotard" (Japanese: 真夜中に翔べレオタード)	Masaharu Okuwaki	Sho Kisugi	October 24, 1983
Rui is drugged and kidnapped while investigating an art collector currently in possession of her father's "Elegance Noir". Using a clue she left behind, it is now up to Hitomi and Ai, along with the unwitting help of the Inunari Precinct personnel, to rescue her before she ends up as an art piece herself.
16	16	"Monday, A Time to Smile"; Transliteration: "Getsuyoubi wa honoemu toki" (Japanese: 月曜日は微笑む時)	Hiroshi Fukutomi	Kenji Terada	October 31, 1983
Cat's Eye targets one of their father's favorite paintings, "At the End of the Show", which is to be stored in a bank's vault and guarded with a motion activated camera. Distrustful of the technology, Toshio decides to guard the painting himself from inside the vault, not knowing that Hitomi is already inside the vault and hiding inside a box. A sudden power failure cuts off the supply of oxygen to the vault and takes everyone by surprise. Toshio begins to lose consciousness, and Hitomi has to give him mouth-to-mouth resuscitation several times using a special survival necklace.
17	17	"Death Worthy of Ammunition"; Transliteration: "Shinigami niwa judan ga fusawashii" (Japanese: 死神には銃弾がふさわしい)	Shunji Oga	Toshimichi Okawa	November 7, 1983
After he fails to protect Ai against a hostage taker, Toshio receives a tongue lashing from Hitomi over his ineptitude. He is eventually detained for losing his temper after the hostage taker turns up dead at a museum guarded by a former Olympic marksman. With Toshio depressed over his performance as a detective, Hitomi pulls a daring heist on her own in order to raise his spirits and resurrect his confidence.
18	18	"After Being Cornered"; Transliteration: "Oitsumerarete" (Japanese: 追いつめられて)	Yoshio Takeuchi	Ryuji Mizutani	November 14, 1983
Hitomi and Ai steal the "Star of Kilimanjaro" from an African Treasure exhibit and enter a Ladies Pro Wrestling venue by mistake while trying to escape from the police. Anxious to get away, they disguise themselves as the wrestling duo "Tiger Ladies" in order to escape the police's stranglehold, but are forced to fight in the next match. Hitomi and Ai must work together and rely on their agility against their bigger and more experienced opponents as an oblivious Toshio cheers them on.
19	19	"Good Evening Just to You"; Transliteration: "Anata dake ni konbanwa" (Japanese: あなただけに今晩は)	Masaharu Okuwaki	Toshimichi Okawa	November 21, 1983
The Chief subjects the personnel of Inunari Precinct to a special training in preparation for guarding "The Mongolian Hawk". However, an alleged ancient curse, a good disguise, Ai's new invention and a secret passageway are all that Cat's Eye needs so they can steal the statue from within Inunari Precinct.
20	20	"Lovers' Vacation"; Transliteration: "Koibito tachi no holiday" (Japanese: 恋人たちのホリデー)	Yoshio Takeuchi	Keisuke Fujikawa	November 28, 1983
Toshio takes Hitomi out for a weekend getaway with Rui's encouragement. A hitchhiking couple, however, disrupts their otherwise tranquil holiday. Back at the Inunari Precinct, Kacho and Asatani investigate a robbery perpetrated by a Cat's Eye copycat, and additional investigation reveals a link to Toshio's passengers. Anxious to prevent their holiday from being interrupted, Rui and Ai work from the shadows to retrieve the stolen ring from the couple with a little help from Hitomi.
21	21	"Just Once, I Want to Meet You"; Transliteration: "Ichido dake anata ni aitai" (Japanese: 一度だけあなたに会いたい)	Toru Itomizu	Tomoko Konparu	December 5, 1983
During a rooftop chase, Cat's Eye saves Toshio from falling, but unknowingly drops the necklace given to her by her father. Hitomi spends several days sulking over its loss until Rui sees an ad placed by Toshio. Convinced of Toshio's sincerity in returning the necklace, Hitomi accepts his invitation and sets an appointment. Asatani becomes suspicious after she catches a glimpse of a Cat's Eye card inside Toshio's drawer and informs Kacho. They tail Toshio in disguise but are foiled by Rui and Ai. As a gesture of appreciation, Cat's Eye agrees to let Toshio see her from behind.
22	22	"The Stranger That Showed Up in the Snow"; Transliteration: "Yuki furu machi no houmonsha" (Japanese: 雪降る日の訪問者)	Masashi Ikeda	Ryuji Mizutani	December 12, 1983
Hitomi saves Toshio's cousin Yukiko from being run over by a car during a chase on a snowy night. Yukiko, who has come over to hold Toshio to a promise of marriage made years before, claims to have seen Cat's Eye's face, which prompts Toshio to ask for her help in creating a facial composite. But even with a picture of Hitomi provided by Asatani, Yukiko fails to recognize Hitomi's face. Although disappointed at the result, Toshio and Asatani take the sketch to the Chief, who orders that copies be sent to other precincts. The Kisugi sisters decide to use the sketch to their advantage as they steal yet another painting.
23	23	"A Sunny Spot of Love in Winter"; Transliteration: "Fuyu wa koi no hidamari" (Japanese: 冬は恋の陽だまり)	Kenta Tange	Kenji Terada	December 19, 1983
The bond of the Kisugi sisters and their commitment to their mission are put to the test when the "Queen's Ruby", displayed in a museum under the directorship of the father of the boy Ai likes, becomes the next Cat's Eye target. Rui and Hitomi must now choose between the memory of their father and the love of their little sister.
24	24	"Santa Came Flying Out of the Sky"; Transliteration: "Santa ga sora kara futte kita" (Japanese: サンタが空から降ってきた)	Yoshio Takeuchi	Toshimichi Okawa	December 26, 1983
Toshio is invited as a special guest to a popular evening FM program that has recently been covering Cat's Eye's exploits. While holiday preparations are ongoing for the Christmas Eve, a vinyl record that was meant as a surprise for Ai goes missing after a short visit from the FM DJ. Amidst the usual mayhem, the Kisugi sisters are forced to retrieve it from the FM studio before midnight in time for a family Christmas party.
25	25	"When the Bell Strikes Twelve"; Transliteration: "12-ji no kane ga naru toki" (Japanese: 12時の鐘が鳴るとき)	Masashi Ikeda	Sho Kisugi	January 9, 1984
The "Ice Queen", a statue on display at an ice museum during the winter festival, becomes the next Cat's Eye target. The only person standing in their way is the headstrong daughter of its current owner and her assortment of well-laid traps. Because Asatani is sick with mumps, Toshio has to work alone in chasing after Cat's Eye while keeping a feisty woman in check.
26	26	"From Runan Island with Love"; Transliteration: "Runan-tou yori ai wa komete" (Japanese: ルナン島より愛をこめて)	Toru Itomizu	Takeo Ono	January 16, 1984
Hitomi steals a golden lion statue so they can infiltrate the lair of a secret organization headquartered on Runan Island, a remote island in the South Pacific. Unbeknownst to Hitomi, the head of the organization, with three hostages, is actually waiting for her to appear so he can use her skills to steal something for him.
27	27	"A Close Call on Runan Island"; Transliteration: "Runan-tou kiki ippatsu" (Japanese: ルナン島危機一髪)	Shunji Oga	Takeo Ono	January 23, 1984
Hitomi is compelled to steal a control box to a laser satellite from an aircraft carrier out of fear for Toshio and her sisters' safety. However, she creates a fake program data and reprograms the satellite to target Runan Island. They make their escape amidst the explosion and the confusion that follows, but Toshio and Hitomi gets separated from Rui and Ai. Both injured and trapped inside a shipwreck, Hitomi and Toshio spend the next few minutes waiting for rescue or death.
28	28	"Lost Memory"; Transliteration: "Ushinawareta kioku" (Japanese: うしなわれた記憶)	Kenji Kodama	Toshimichi Okawa	January 30, 1984
Ai is diagnosed of temporary dissociative amnesia caused by an incident after stealing a painting with Hitomi. She also undergoes regression and develops pyrophobia. Rui, Hitomi and Toshio take her out for a drive hoping it would help in her recovery. As Ai struggles to regain her memory, it soon becomes clear that some unidentified men are after her life. When Ai finally regains her memory, the Kisugi sisters must work together to retrieve the painting and save a foreign politician from an assassination attempt.
29	29	"The Brilliant Fashion Show"; Transliteration: "Show wa hanayaka ni" (Japanese: ショーは華やかに)	Yoshio Takeuchi	Tomoko Konparu	February 6, 1984
"Venus' Sigh", a set of pearls, which is the highlight of a fashion show becomes the next Cat's Eye target. Asatani becomes suspicious when Hitomi appears as a replacement model, but does not have enough evidence. She corners Cat's Eye but losses her glasses in the resulting scuffle. Cat's Eye escapes, but not before Asatani gives her a bite mark. It is now just a matter of checking Hitomi's arm.
30	30	"The Smell of Death Is Athletic"; Transliteration: "Athletic wa shi no nioi" (Japanese: アスレチックは死の匂い)	Masashi Ikeda	Takeo Ono	February 13, 1984
When Cat's Eye attempts to steal their next objective, "A Boat Harbors in the Afternoon". they find it already stolen. Ai's new invention reveals who took the picture before them, and Rui and Hitomi infiltrate and steal the painting from a secret auction held inside an exclusive athletic club. However, Ai is injured on the shoulder by a bullet which was shot by a gun during their escape and taken hostage. Cat's Eye keep their end of the terms and conditions for her release, but the owner of the auction, Kunihiko Date is not too keen on letting them go, leading to themselves becoming kidnapped victims as he tries to crush them by the descending elevator.
31	31	"It Started With a Kiss"; Transliteration: "Soreha kiss de hajimatta" (Japanese: それはキッスで始まった)	Toru Itomizu	Toshimichi Okawa	February 20, 1984
While on a date, Toshio is given orders to investigate a museum which houses a ruby said to be the target of Slim Suspense who has recently appeared in Japan. Hitomi tags along and discovers that "The Flaming Rose" has already been stolen. In addition, Slim Suspense captures her and steals a kiss right in front of Toshio. Hitomi escapes after she comes to her senses, but has to be hospitalized right after for possible injuries. Slim Suspense pays her a visit and abducts her a second time, intent on making her his woman. Hitomi leaves a series of trails and clues to her whereabouts all over the city as Slim Suspense goes on a spree of robbery meant to provide her with a luxurious lifestyle. On discovering the location of the ruby, Hitomi finally reveals her identity and confronts him while Rui and Ai recover the ruby. Slim Suspense acknowledges Cat's Eye and escapes just as the Toshio and the rest of the police arrive.
32	32	"The Museum Houses Many Dangers"; Transliteration: "Bijutsukan wa kiken ga ippai" (Japanese: 美術館は危険がいっぱい)	Shunji Oga	Hidekuni Nagaumi	February 27, 1984
Cat's Eye targets the "Purple Orpheus", the special exhibit piece of the newly-opened Shimazu Museum. Unbeknownst to them, the amethyst is actually a bait to lure them inside. Although Rui is somewhat suspicious of the lack of security in place and non-publication of the Cat's Eye notice, Hitomi and Ai sees nothing but a good opportunity. However, the museum is riddled with deadly traps set by someone bent on revenge, and a pressure-activated bomb becomes the ultimate test for Hitomi and Ai.
33	33	"The Target is a Marriage Proposal"; Transliteration: "Target wa propose" (Japanese: 標的（ターゲット）はプロポーズ)	Yoshio Takeuchi	Tomoko Konparu	March 5, 1984
When Toshio begins daydreaming about Hitomi being Cat's Eye, his Chief is convinced that he has fallen in love with Cat's Eye and needs to sort out his feelings by making a definite proposal to his girlfriend. Unfortunately for Toshio, Hitomi is too busy with preparing the impending heist of the painting "Girl Amid the Spring Breeze" to think of anything else, which prompts him to renew his resolve for capturing Cat's Eye before proposing marriage. And this time, with his attention at its highest peak, Toshio comes dangerously close to achieving his goal.
34	34	"Have You Seen Heinz?"; Transliteration: "Kimi wa Heinz wa mitaka?" (Japanese: 君はハインツを見たか?)	Toru Itomizu	Toshimichi Okawa	March 12, 1984
With renewed vigor because of his recent engagement to Hitomi, Toshio convinces his team to focus on the artist of the artworks Cat's Eye has targeted so far in order to establish their modus operandi. After much investigation and research, he identifies the artist and art collector. The next Cat's Eye target, which does not appear to have any connection to the artist, tests the plausibility of his theory.
35	35	"Unraveling Cat's Eye's Secret"; Transliteration: "Abake! Cats no himitsu" (Japanese: 暴け! キャッツの秘密)	Masashi Ikeda	Takeo Ono	March 19, 1984
Toshio receives a response to his request to the German government regarding Heinz's background and artwork. The documents point to a painting which holds a possible clue to his identity. Concerned that their identity might soon be revealed, Ai secretly follows Toshio and Asatani across the country as they search for the location of the scenery found in the painting. Unknown to them, a plan has already been put in place to keep Cat's Eye's secret safe.
36	36	"The Man Who Knew Heinz"; Transliteration: "Heinz wo shiru otoko" (Japanese: ハインツを知る男)	Toru Itomizu	Takeo Ono	March 26, 1984
A collector of Heinz's artwork returns to Japan after several years of absence. It is soon revealed that he represents an individual who is keen on meeting with the Kisugi sisters. However, he is found dead before they can leave Japan, forcing Cat's Eye to recover the painting that led to his death. In the process of doing so, they find out that the key to meeting their father is in Paris. Cat's Eye decide to go on Paris, Hitomi meet up with her detective boyfriend Toshio to tell she go on several days in Paris for vacation. Toshio want to give her a kiss but reluctanty. Hitomi think he give him a kiss but with her sisters suggestion, they tell spend they time alone together because Toshio is a klutz. Hitomi called Toshio and jump to him to give a kiss.

=== Season 2 ===
No. overall	No. in season	Title	Directed by	Written by	Original release date
37	1	"The She-Cat from France"; Transliteration: "France kara kita mesuneko" (Japanese: フランスから来た牝猫)	Kenji Kodama	Takeo Ono	October 8, 1984
Before they can conclude their search for their father in Paris, Cat's Eye is forced to return to Japan when an impostor using their name and calling card is committing several violent high-profile heists which leave Toshio injured. When Hitomi faces the fake Cat's Eye, the impostor proposes a partnership between them, which Hitomi refuses outright. However, when the fraud Cat's Eye kidnaps a friend and informant who bears news about their father's whereabouts, Cat's Eye takes up arms against a very tough and ruthless adversary.
38	2	"A Soaking Dance at Midnight"; Transliteration: "Midnight ni nurete mau" (Japanese: ミッドナイトに濡れて舞う)	Masaharu Okuwaki	Hiroshi Kashiwabara	October 15, 1984
As Cat's Eye prepares to claim Heinz's painting "The Golden Path" from Yokohama yakuza boss Maejima, Toshio is about to be transferred to organized crime investigations for his constant failure in apprehending Cat's Eye. But in a twist of fate, their paths cross yet again when Toshio investigates Maejima's drug trafficking schemes. In order to both save the painting and Toshio's police job, Rui must devise a scheme which keeps both objectives in balance.
39	3	"Angels' Ransom"; Transliteration: "Tenshi tachi no minoshirokin" (Japanese: 天使たちの身代金)	Yoshio Takeuchi	Junichi Miyashita	October 22, 1984
While escaping the scene of one of their heists, Cat's Eye stops to rescue a boy from a burning house, leaving the stolen paintings ("On the Shore" and "The Wings of the Night") behind, whereupon they are hailed by the press as heroines. Soon afterwards, a criminal art collector named Shell kidnaps a bus with twenty school children in order to force Cat's Eye to obtain the paintings for him. However, Shell goes back on his word and even begins to frame Cat's Eye for the kidnapping, forcing Cat's Eye to take him down and rescue the children to both regain the paintings and clear their reputation.
40	4	"A Scare in the Dark"; Transliteration: "Kurayami de dokiri" (Japanese: 暗闇でどっきり)	Shunji Oga	Yuichi Higurashi	October 29, 1984
For his next mission against Cat's Eye, Toshio has himself locked inside a near-impenetrable museum for two days to guard "The Mermaid" painting. Cat's Eye arrives to pull off the heist, but by springing a carefully prepared trap, Toshio catches Hitomi in her Cat's Eye costume. After Ai manages to knock him out, Cat's Eye must resort to every trick in their book to make Toshio believe that this encounter was just a hallucination.
41	5	"The Hunter Wore a Badge"; Transliteration: "Karyudo wa badge o tsuketeita" (Japanese: 狩人はバッヂをつけていた)	Kenji Kodama	Toshimichi Okawa	November 5, 1984
A well-known but unscrupulous elite police commissioner, Himuro, arrives in town to help guard an important art collection (which includes Heinz's "The Twins") arriving from Hong Kong. His plan is to fake a theft of the collection in order to lure Cat's Eye to him. The Chief, unwilling to resort to such underhanded methods, attempts to apprehend Hitomi as she comes to recover the painting, but both end up locked inside a deadly trap. When Himuro refuses to abort the mission, Cat's Eye and Toshio must work together to save the lives of their imperiled friends.
42	6	"The Stolen "I Love You""; Transliteration: "Nusumareta I love you" (Japanese: 盗まれたアイ・ラブ・ユー)	Masaharu Okuwaki	Junichi Miyashita	November 12, 1984
An unexpected burglary into his apartment, which deprived him of the money to pay his rent, forces Toshio to live with the Kisugi sisters. On top of that, the culprit behind this deed, the notorious serial burglar "#107", robs the Kisugi house the very same night and makes off with their latest objective, the lithograph "The Firefly Woman", and a confessional recording made by Toshio for Hitomi as part of his loot. Cat's Eye and a determined Toshio quickly discover that #107 is Ai's latest admirer, a playboy and supplier of an underground auction market, and must catch him before some embarrassing secrets can be revealed.
43	7	"The Good Life"; Transliteration: "Oishi seikatsu" (Japanese: おいしい生活)	Kenji Kodama	Yuichi Higurashi	November 19, 1984
After his success in catching #107, an elated Toshio has decided to stay with the Kisugi sisters for a little while longer, which creates serious complications for Cat's Eye. Cat's Eye must now work hard to get rid of Toshio before their next target, the mural "The Silk Road", which is part of a foreign national collection, is to be shipped back within the next two days.
44	8	"The Magnificent Trap"; Transliteration: "Karei naru wana" (Japanese: 華麗なる罠)	Yoshio Takeuchi	Hiroshi Kashiwabara	November 26, 1984
Despite the security measures taken against them, Cat's Eye succeeds in nabbing their latest target, "Milky Way", a loan to ABC Foundations, a charity organization devoted to non-profit art exhibitions. But then Cat's Eye stumbles upon a plot involving attempted murder, an impostor, and a major theft scheme, and in the face of this, they strike a deal with ABC's President John Connelly: The "Milky Way" in exchange for stopping this insidious plan.
45	9	"Cap-race-io of Love"; Transliteration: "Koi no kyosoukyoku" (Japanese: 恋の狂走曲)	Directed by : Masaharu Okuwaki; Storyboarded by : Momota Ogashira	Takeo Ono	December 3, 1984
During Cat's Eye's latest heist, an inauspicious circumstance has forced Ai to hide their objective - a huge diamond stolen from the Kobari Company - underneath one of the Inunari Precinct's police cars. However, the car in question is used by Toshio to take Hitomi for a joyride on the next day; the company's president, who is involved in many illegal businesses and urgently wants his diamond back, knows about the car's significance as well; and to top things off, a young, cocky thief promptly steals it for use as his personal racing car.
46	10	"The Most Dangerous Game"; Transliteration: "Motto kiken na game" (Japanese: もっとも危険なゲーム)	Masaharu Okuwaki	Yuichi Higurashi	December 10, 1984
47	11	"The Gift is Dad's Wine"; Transliteration: "Present wa papa no wine" (Japanese: プレゼントはパパのワイン)	Yoshio Takeuchi	Junichi Miyashita	December 17, 1984
One evening, Cat's Eye is unexpectedly visited by Hans Schmidt, their father's tutor in the arts. Schmidt asks the Kisugi sisters to recover a bottle of wine from 1944, which sports a label bearing one of Heinz's sketches; the bottle in question, believed long lost, is being offered at an auction at the Tokyo Oriental Hotel. Cat's Eye manages to get the bottle, but the wine turns out to be the key to a terrible chemical weapon jointly developed by Nazi Germany and the Japanese Empire - and a band of hardline Nazi veterans intends to make use of it to resurrect the Third Reich.
48	12	"A Mystery for a Winter Night"; Transliteration: "Fuuyu no yoru wa mystery" (Japanese: 冬の夜はミステリー)	Kenji Kodama	Takeo Ono	January 7, 1985
A new case baffles both the police and Cat's Eye when several paintings which were just stolen by Cat's Eye are mysteriously taken from their secret hiding place and returned to their owners for a reward. To their immense surprise, Hitomi and Rui find out that Ai is behind this, though not on her own volition; she has been hypnotized by an attention-seeking spendthrift, who has deduced that she is part of Cat's Eye and now uses her to finance his extravagant lifestyle. But with his debt holders finally calling in, the villain eventually drives Ai into attempting to kill her own sisters!
49	13	"Yokohama Bay Blues"; Transliteration: "Yokohama Bay Blues" (Japanese: 横浜ベイブルース)	Hiroshi Fukutomi	Hiroshi Kashiwabara	January 14, 1985
During another heist in Yokohama, Hitomi is late in joining her sisters from her date with Toshio, forcing Rui and Ai to steal their latest objective without her help. However, they find the targeted painting already missing, stolen by the owner's daughter Midori, who mistakenly believes that her father does not care about her and has fallen in with a local gang. Unfortunately, Midori's father makes the mistake of hiring Sawada, a greedy private detective, to find her; Sawada swipes the painting and attempts to sell it for his own profit.
50	14	"For You, The Tear of the Stars"; Transliteration: "Kimi ni hoshi no namida o" (Japanese: 君に星の涙を)	Kenji Kodama	Junichi Miyashita	January 21, 1985
51	15	"Fake Wedding Bells"; Transliteration: "Utsuwari no wedding bell" (Japanese: 偽りのウェディング・ベル)	Masaharu Okuwaki	Yuichi Higurashi	January 28, 1985
Cat's Eye plans to steal one of their objectives, a crucifix as part of a Maria statue, from a church in a ski resort, with Toshio and the police as usual attempting to stop them. Toshio uses this opportunity to propose a trap for Cat's Eye via a fake wedding with Hitomi, much to the intended "bride's" chagrin. However, Rui hits upon the idea to exploit the ceremony for their heist - a plan which leads to a chaotic crash of the fake wedding, a furious ski slope chase, and the discovery and exposure of yet another theft scheme.
52	16	"Beware of the Sweet Allure"; Transliteration: "Umai sasoi ni ki o tsukete" (Japanese: 甘い誘いに気をつけて)	Kenji Kodama	Hiroshi Kashiwabara	February 4, 1985
While Cat's Eye scouts the site of their next operation (the theft of Heinz's "Virgin Snow"), they find that the door to the vault in which the painting is kept is virtually impregnable. It appears fortunate that Hasebe, the gallery's owner, has developed an intimate interest in Hitomi, so that Cat's Eye can use this chance to gain the key and lock combination to the vault. However, as it turns out, Hasebe has a sick obsession for women of perfect beauty - and Hitomi has become the latest prize for his collection!
53	17	"Farewell, Winter Seagull"; Transliteration: "Saraba fuuyu no kamome" (Japanese: さらば、冬のカモメ)	Shunji Oga	Toshimichi Okawa	February 11, 1985
Following the latest Cat's Eye heist, Hitomi ends up on the deck of an American warship, where she - like the crew - succumbs to knockout gas and gets the jewel she has looted stolen. In addition, Mac, a lovestruck sailor, is innocently entangled in a major weapons theft from that ship in which Cathy Lane, the love of his life, appears to be involved. Cat's Eye springs Mac from captivity and enlist his help in finding Cathy, their only lead in recovering the stolen jewel and proving Mac's innocence.
54	18	"The Woman the Chief Fell For"; Transliteration: "Kacho no horeta onna" (Japanese: 課長のほれた女（ひと）)	Hiroshi Fukutomi	Takeo Ono	February 18, 1985
A cunning thief by the name of Winter Firefly is raiding jewelry stores all over town while continually evading any security measures set up by the police, frustrating the Chief to no end. Therefore it comes as a blessing that he is lately seeing a beautiful woman with whom he feels completely at ease. With Toshio being pressured by his boss around the clock to catch Winter Firefly, Cat's Eye refrains from stealing their next objective, the "Dragon's Eye", upon Hitomi's request. But when Winter Firefly ends up stealing the gemstone, Cat's Eye is forced to do detective work in order to find out how Winter Firefly gains sensitive information only the Inunari police would know about.
55	19	"The Inunari Station Trio"; Transliteration: "Inunaki sho sanjyusho" (Japanese: 犬鳴署三重奏)	Masaharu Okuwaki	Toshimichi Okawa	February 25, 1985
Another Cat's Eye target, the "Goddess Statue", is due to arrive from Los Angeles in Tokyo, but neither the Chief nor Asatani appear overly concerned about its security. As Cat's Eye learn later from Toshio, a computer provided by an American security company is set to provide a plan to catch them in the act; therefore the sisters have to work extra-hard to find out what the police has in store for them, even if it means taking the Chief and Asatani on a wild goose chase through the city.
56	20	"Uneasy Feelings about a Transfer Student"; Transliteration: "Tenkosei ni munesawagi" (Japanese: 転校生に胸さわぎ)	Kenji Kodama	Junichi Miyashita	March 4, 1985
A new celebrity student by the name of Fumiya Fujisaki transfers to Ohashi High School. At the same time, Cat's Eye intends to steal a precious violin, formerly part of Heinz's collection, bequeathed to Fumiya by his late father. Initially, Ai takes Fumiya's cool, detached manner as a personal offense, and she eagerly supports the theft plan. But after she gets to know him better, she and her sisters come to his aid when he becomes the victim of an attempt on his life by his treacherous bodyguard.
57	21	"A Requiem for the Villains"; Transliteration: "Akudomo ni chingokan requiem o" (Japanese: 悪党どもに鎮魂歌（レクイエム）を)	Shunji Oga	Hiroshi Kashiwabara	March 11, 1985
Right before Cat's Eye can nab another of their father's paintings, the owner is murdered and the picture stolen, and Cat's Eye ends up being implicated as the culprits. On top of that, the mastermind behind the theft turns out to be a corrupt politician, who exploits that opportunity to further frame Cat's Eye in order to ward off suspicion. His scheme forces the Kisugi sisters to break into the heavily secured National Diet Building to prove their innocence, expose the politician as the villain he is, and regain their father's stolen artwork.
58	22	"Toshio Falls in Love with a Phantom Woman"; Transliteration: "Maboroshi no onna o aishita Toshio" (Japanese: 幻の女を愛した俊夫)	Hiroshi Fukutomi	Yuichi Higurashi	March 18, 1985
Posing as an underground informer, Hitomi leaks fake information about an impending Cat's Eye theft to Toshio as part of a plan to facilitate their actual scheme: Recovering their father's painting "The Phantom Woman" from a villainous art collector. However, a love confession Hitomi impulsively blurts out as her motive for aiding Toshio makes her worry that Toshio is beginning to actually fall in love with his mystery informer, making her question their relationship.
59	23	"Romance Out Of the Blue"; Transliteration: "Koi wa totsuzen ni" (Japanese: 恋は突然に)	Masaharu Okuwaki	Takeo Ono	March 25, 1985
Rui falls for a young talented painter who wants to gain international fame through her portrait. But he must first repay a debt of gratitude to the owner of the painting that Cat's Eye is after.
60	24	"Hot April Fools Day"; Transliteration: "April fool wa o atsui" (Japanese: エイプリルフールはお熱く)	Shunji Oga	Junichi Miyashita	April 1, 1985
One day, Toshio approaches the Kisugi sisters with a highly unusual request for help. He is taking part in an operation to expose a businessman named Iwao Yagami, who has hired a hitman to kill Cat's Eye after they have stolen too many pieces of his precious art collection, and gone into drug trafficking to finance his revenge plan. Toshio intends to win Yagami's trust by disguising himself as the hitman, who shares a startling likeness with him, and pretending to kill Cat's Eye - and therefore, he wants Hitomi, Rui and Ai to effectively pose as themselves!
61	25	"Capricious Scramble"; Transliteration: "Kimagure scramble" (Japanese: 気まぐれスクランブル)	Kenji Kodama	Toshimichi Okawa	April 8, 1985
Toshio's daring and bravery captivates a young traffic officer, much to Hitomi's displeasure. But she has no time to brood over it as she has to attend a ball held in a luxury liner with a young doctor.
62	26	"The Halftime of Love"; Transliteration: "Koi no half-time" (Japanese: 恋のハーフタイム)	Masaharu Okuwaki	Takeo Ono	April 15, 1985
Just before an upcoming football match between the Inunari Police and the neighborhood association at Ohashi High School, Cat's Eye has set its aim on a large diamond, "Queen of Queens", in the possession of Yasuzo Shirai, a shifty businessman with ties to the Mafia. After stealing the gem, however, Cat's Eye finds it difficult to shake off the police. As a last resort, Rui and Hitomi flee to the school and hide the diamond in one of the footballs. When that very football ends up on the field and its significance becomes known, the friendly event turns into a slaughterfest between Ai and her schoolmates, Shirai, and the Inunari Police.
63	27	"Don't Cry, Inunari Trio"; Transliteration: "Nakuna inunaki trio" (Japanese: 泣くな犬鳴トリオ)	Yoshio Takeuchi	Yuichi Higurashi	April 22, 1985
Because of their repeated inability to apprehend Cat's Eye, a reshuffling of post results in a demotion for Toshio, Asatani and the Chief to menial duty. Additionally, the new chief, Murakami, proves to be an ambitious opponent for Cat's Eye. Nevertheless, Toshio, Asatani and the Chief join forces for a guerilla operation to prove their worth and restore themselves to their old posts.
64	28	"Farewell to My Mommies"; Transliteration: "Sayonara boku mama tachi" (Japanese: サヨナラボクのママ達)	Masaharu Okuwaki	Takeo Ono	April 29, 1985
On his date night with Hitomi, Toshio is out of the blue asked to look after Yuichi, a neighbor's kid. He leaves him in Hitomi's care as he goes to prepare against a heist Cat's Eye is about to pull. Of course, this new complication, as well as the fact that the item they are looking for is well hidden, forces Cat's Eye to actually take Yuichi along for the ride - where he proves himself surprisingly useful.
65	29	"A Toast to Travel in the Golden Years"; Transliteration: "Full moon ni kampai" (Japanese: フルムーンに乾杯)	Shunji Oga	Junichi Miyashita	May 6, 1985
An elderly couple visits Japan in search of the Japanese spirit. They are also the owners of the next Cat's Eye target, and it seems like others are also after them.
66	30	"Dancing Belongs in the Starry Skies"; Transliteration: "Dance wa hoshi zora de" (Japanese: ダンスは星空で)	Kenji Kodama	Tomoko Konparu	May 13, 1985
The Kisugi sisters attend a ball in disguise to expose the true identity and purpose of its host. Even though Hitomi would love to dance with Toshio, Cat's Eye just doesn't have enough time left in order to finish their mission.
67	31	"The Splendid Leotard"; Transliteration: "Subarashiki leotard" (Japanese: 素晴らしきレオタード)	Masaharu Okuwaki	Yuichi Higurashi	May 27, 1985
The Kisugi sisters participate in the "Miss Leotard" contest where a piece from their father's collection shows up as a grand prize. But a formidable and unexpected rival joins them. Which one of them will win the coveted prize?
68	32	"Head over Heels for Hitomi"; Transliteration: "Hitomi ni kubitake" (Japanese: 瞳にくびったけ)	Shunji Oga	Hiroshi Kashiwabara	June 3, 1985
After a part of their father's collection ended up stolen ten years ago, the Kisugi sisters befriend the culprit, Sakai, who has just finished his prison term, in order to find the hiding place. But hindering the investigation are Sakai's two greedy but clumsy ex-accomplices, and additionally, the hiding place turns out to have been in the most unexpected location.
69	33	"Heartbreak over Cat's"; Transliteration: "Cat's ni heartbreak" (Japanese: キャッツにハートブレイク)	Kenji Kodama	Yuichi Higurashi	June 10, 1985
Posing as a very handsome man, Hitomi scouts a jewelry fair for Cat's Eye's next target, the "Amadeus" gemstone. However, this particular disguise garners unwanted romantic attentions from both Asatani and Akiko, one of Ai's younger schoolmates and a girl gang leader, creating an awful lot of complications for the lady thieves to overcome.
70	34	"To the Southern Cross, With Love"; Transliteration: "Minami jyujisei ni ai o komete" (Japanese: 南十字星に愛をこめて)	Masaharu Okuwaki	Hiroshi Kashiwabara	June 17, 1985
The Kisugi sisters go to Saipan for a much-needed "vacation", much to Toshio's unease. Unknown to him, they are in pursuit of a set of solid gold tableware engraved with their father's art. But a deadly trap lies in wait for them.
71	35	"Your True Face is a Silhouette"; Transliteration: "Kimi no sugao wa silhouette" (Japanese: 君の素顔はシルエット)	Kenji Kodama	Junichi Miyashita	June 24, 1985
While scouting the private gallery of philanthropic businessman Daizo Kuroiwa, Rui discovers that the targeted painting, "Glass Goddess", and likely all pictures in the exhibition are clever fakes. During an attempted theft of the picture the very next night, Cat's Eye silhouette is caught by the security cameras. Instead of aiding the police investigation, Kuroiwa intends to use the latest technology to publicly reveal Cat's Eye's identity in the interest of self-publicity. But are things really that simple with Cat's Eye as an opponent? Note: The soundtrack used in the TV show includes several titles from Pictures at an Exhibition.
72	36	"Just One Chance to Steal"; Transliteration: "Nusumi no chance wa ichido dake" (Japanese: 盗みのチャンスは一度だけ)	Shunji Oga	Toshimichi Okawa	July 1, 1985
Cat's Eye's next objective is stored in the Hirayama Art Museum, a fully automated facility famous for catching a sizeable number of thieves with its sophisticated security systems. Hitomi manages to get inside, but Toshio blocks off her one and only escape route, forcing her to flee through an impregnable museum dotted with insidious traps.
73	37	"Curtain Call of Love"; Transliteration: "Ai no curtain call" (Japanese: 愛のカーテンコール)	Masaharu Okuwaki	Takeo Ono	July 8, 1985
Ai writes about Cat's Eye for their school play - and who can portray Cat's Eye better than the Kisugi sisters themselves? Toshio finds out about the play and begged to join the cast. Kacho and Asatani joins to complete the Inunari Trio - along with the rest of the department. Under the watchful eyes of real police officers, will Cat's Eye be able to steal the ring from the "victim" for real? Can Toshio bring himself to arrest Hitomi? With so many adlibs in between, will the play be a success?

== 2025 series ==
No.	Title	Directed by	Written by	Original release date
1	"Cat's Eye Is Here"; Transliteration: "Kyattsu Ai Sanjō" (Japanese: キャッツアイ参上)	Yoshifumi Sueda	Hayashi Mori	September 26, 2025
2	"Memory of Dad"; Transliteration: "Papa no Omoide" (Japanese: パパの思い出)	Yoshifumi Sueda	Tsukasa Hôjô; Hayashi Mori	October 3, 2025
3	"Difficult Love"; Transliteration: "Yakkai na Koi" (Japanese: やっかいな恋)	Yoshifumi Sueda	Tsukasa Hôjô; Hayashi Mori	October 10, 2025
4	"Night Flight Is a Dangerous Scent"; Transliteration: "Yakan Hikō wa Kiken'na Kaori" (Japanese: 夜間飛行は危険な香り)	Yoshifumi Sueda	Tsukasa Hôjô; Hayashi Mori	October 17, 2025
5	"Gentleman Thief Is Here!"; Transliteration: "Dorobō Shinshi Tojō" (Japanese: 泥棒紳士登場)	Yoshifumi Sueda	Tsukasa Hôjô; Hayashi Mori	October 24, 2025
6	"I Wish We Could Stay As We Are"; Transliteration: "Dekiru Koto Nara Kono Mama de" (Japanese: できることならこのままで)	Yoshifumi Sueda	Tsukasa Hôjô; Hayashi Mori	October 31, 2025
7	"Stay Out of the Diary!"; Transliteration: "DIARY ni wa Te wo Dasuna!" (Japanese: DIARYには手を出すな！)	Yoshifumi Sueda	Tsukasa Hôjô; Hayashi Mori	December 26, 2025
8	"Dad's Self-Portrait"; Transliteration: "Chichi no Shōzōga" (Japanese: 父の肖像画)	Yoshifumi Sueda	Tsukasa Hôjô; Hayashi Mori	January 2, 2026
9	"Get the Goddess of Mars"; Transliteration: "Marusu no Megami o Nerae" (Japanese: マルスの女神をねらえ)	Yoshifumi Sueda	Tsukasa Hôjô; Hayashi Mori	January 9, 2026
10	"First Date in a While"; Transliteration: "Hisashiburi no Dēto" (Japanese: 久しぶりのデート)	Yoshifumi Sueda	Tsukasa Hôjô; Hayashi Mori	January 16, 2026
11	"An Invitation from Runan Island"; Transliteration: "Hanare Nantō kara no jōtaijō" (Japanese: 離南島からの招待状)	Yoshifumi Sueda	Tsukasa Hôjô; Hayashi Mori	January 23, 2026
12	"The Promise of Sunset"; Transliteration: "Yūhi no Yakusoku" (Japanese: 夕陽の約束)	Unknown	Unknown	January 30, 2026
