= Daiichi Kosho Whisper =

Japanese paramotor

Whisper

General information
- Type: Paramotor
- National origin: Japan
- Manufacturer: Daiichi Kosho Company
- Status: Production completed

History
- Manufactured: circa 1993–2003
- Introduction date: circa 1993
- First flight: 1992
- Variant: Paraborne Backplane

The Daiichi Kosho Whisper is a Japanese paramotor that was designed and produced by the Daiichi Kosho Company for powered paragliding.

== Design and development ==
Daiichi Kosho, a Japanese electronics company, specializing in Karaoke equipment, decided to enter the paramotor market in circa 1993, expecting that it would become immensely popular and result in a mass market. As a result, they designed and manufactured their own engine, the DK 472 and even created their own line of canopies.

The aircraft was designed to comply with the US FAR 103 Ultralight Vehicles rules. It features a paraglider-style high wing, single-place accommodation and a single Daiichi Kosho DK 472 22 hp (16 kW) engine in pusher configuration. As is the case with all paramotors, takeoff and landing are accomplished on foot.

The company invested heavily in research and development, producing a whole line of paramotoring equipment including a twin-cylinder and single-cylinder engine. In addition to the two different engines they also produced a trike carriage, the DK Sky Trike, that could be mated to the backpack engine. The company created a distributor network, notably in the US where they were represented by Paraborne Aviation, who created a dealer network. In the US the aircraft is often referred to as the Paraborne DK Whisper. The mass market the company hoped for never appeared and with a high degree of competition from European manufacturers the company ceased all production of the line circa 2003. The line was sold to Giles Cardoza of the United Kingdom who developed it into the Parajet.

== Variants ==
Beat
Initial model, powered by a twin-cylinder, 250 cc (15 cu in) horizontally opposed, air-cooled, two-stroke custom designed Daiichi Kosho DK 472 engine driving a 29 in (74 cm) direct-drive propeller and producing 22 hp (16 kW).
Whisper
Also called the Beat Whisper. Second model, powered by a DK 472 engine with a belt reduction drive and larger propeller.
Whisper GT
Third model, optionally powered by a single-cylinder, two-stroke engine with a belt reduction drive.
Whisper GTO
Fourth model, powered by a single-cylinder, two-stroke engine with a belt reduction drive. Can optionally carry a passenger in tandem.
Sky Trike
Wheeled carriage that adapts to motor package, made from ABS plastic and aluminium, weight 44 lb (20 kg)

== Specifications (Whisper) ==
Data from Cliche and Kitplanes

General characteristics

- Crew: one
- Length: 2 ft (0.61 m)
- Wingspan: 40 ft (12 m)
- Height: 4 ft (1.2 m) powerpack only
- Wing area: 320 sq ft (30 m^{2})
- Empty weight: 60 lb (27 kg)
- Gross weight: 300 lb (136 kg)
- Fuel capacity: 1.7 U.S. gallons (6.4 L; 1.4 imp gal)
- Powerplant: 1 × Daiichi Kosho DK 472 two cylinder, two-stroke, air-cooled aircraft engine, 22 hp (16 kW)
- Propellers: 3-bladed composite

Performance

- Cruise speed: 25 mph (40 km/h, 22 kn)
- Range: 20 mi (32 km, 17 nmi)
- Service ceiling: 18,000 ft (5,500 m)
- Rate of climb: 450 ft/min (2.3 m/s)
