= Resonancia =

Studio album by Akina Nakamori
- Released: 22 May 2002
- Recorded: 2001−2002
- Studio: Be-Born Studio; Sunrise Studio Tower Side; Sound Atelier; Universal Recording Studios; Sangmind Studio (South Korea)
- Genre: J-pop; Latin; samba
- Length: 53:07
- Language: Japanese
- Label: Universal Music Japan
- Producer: Uru

Akina Nakamori chronology
Zero Album: Utahime 2 (2002)	Resonancia (2002)	Utahime Double Decade (2002)

Singles from Resonancia
- 1. "It's Brand New Day" Released: 31 May 2001; 2. "The Heat (Musica Fiesta)" Released: 2 May 2002

Resonancia is the twentieth studio album by Japanese singer Akina Nakamori and first studio album to be released during the 2000s. It was released on 22 May 2002 under the Universal Music Japan label. The album includes lead singles "It's Brand New Day" and "The Heat (Musica Fiesta)".

The album includes Akina's original written song Deseo under pseudonym Miran:Miran.

== Promotion ==
=== Singles ===
It consists of two previously released singles.

It's Brand New Day is the fortieth single written and arranged by Adya. It was released on 31 May 2001 under indies label "@ease". It was her only single to be released in that year. The single wasn't released as a regular CD, but instead digital single through music service Music Nifty operated by Nifty Corporation. The single was included only in the compilation album Utahime Densetsu: 90's Best. The single was later re-released in the CD format as a live goods in the live tour "All About Akina: 20th Anniversary IT'S BRAND NEW DAY".

The Heat (Musica Fiesta) is the forty-first single written by Adya and Uru. It was released on 5 May 2002, it was her only single to be released in that year. In the media it was promoted as a monthly (May) theme song to the TBS television program Wonderful. The original version of single was included in the compilation album Best Finger 25th anniversary selection and All Time Best: Originals. The single debuted at number 20 on the Oricon Single Weekly Charts.

=== Music home video ===
On 10 July 2002, was released Nakamori's second music home video Apasionado. The disc includes music videoclips of single The Heat: Musica Fiesta and album track Missed U, making footages and interview.

== Stage performances ==
It's Brand New Day has been performed in the anniversary live tour "All About Akina: 20th Anniversary IT'S BRAND NEW DAY".

The album tracks Missed U, Carnaval, Carmesi and The Heat: Musica Fiesta has been performed once in the live tour Music Fiesta Tour in 2002.

== Chart performance ==
The album reached at number 15 on the Oricon Album Weekly Chart charted for the 4 consecutive weeks with the sales of 31,000 copies. During its re-release in 2023, the album debut at number 86 on the Billboard Japan´s Album Weekly Charts.

== Track listing ==
Resonancia track listing
No.	Title	Lyrics	Music	Arranger(s)	Length
1.	"Carnaval"	Adya	Justin	Justin	3:42
2.	"Eyes on You"	Adya	Uru	Uru	4:32
3.	"Carmesi"	Adya	Uru	Uru	4:35
4.	"The Heat (Musica Fiesta)" (album version)	Adya	Uru	Uru	4:54
5.	"Missed U"	She	Takashi Tsushimi	243 / URU	4:26
6.	"Resonancia (Interude)"		URU		0:46
7.	"Kaze to Taiyō" (風と太陽)	Seriko Natsuno	Uru	Uru	4:11
8.	"Ibiza"	K-CO	Uru	Uru	4:49
9.	"Deseo"	Miran:Miran; Mr.Blistah	Uru	Uru	4:39
10.	"Lost Words"	Adya	Justin	Uru / Justin	5:24
11.	"Siesta (Interude)"		Justin		0:27
12.	"It's Brand New Day" (URU Latin Mix)	Adya	Adya	Uru	5:00
13.	"Bonita Terra"	Adya	Uru	Uru	5:35

== Release history ==
Year	Format(s)	Serial number	Label(s)	Ref.
2003	CD	UMCK-1111	Kitty MME	
2017	UHQCD	UPCH-7265	Kitty MME	
2023	LP, CD	UPCY-7839, UPJY-9348	Kitty MME	
