= Henshū Ō =

Japanese manga series

- First tankōbon volume cover

編集王
- Genre: Drama
- Manga
- Written by: Seiki Tsuchida
- Published by: Shogakukan
- Magazine: Weekly Big Comic Spirits
- Original run: 1993 – 1997
- Volumes: 16
- Television drama
- Directed by: Masato Hijikata; Yūichi Satō
- Written by: Takehiko Hata; Sumino Kawashima; Masashi Sogo
- Original network: Fuji TV
- Original run: October 19, 2000 – December 19, 2000
- Episodes: 11
- icon

Henshū Ō (編集王; lit. 'King of Editors') is a Japanese manga series written and illustrated by Seiki Tsuchida. It was serialized in Shogakukan's seinen manga magazine Weekly Big Comic Spirits from 1993 to 1997, with its chapters collected in 16 tankōbon volumes. It was adapted into a television drama series broadcast on Fuji TV in 2000.

== Plot ==
The series follows Kanpachi Momoi (桃井 環八, Momoi Kanpachi), a former boxer whose career was cut short by a debilitating retinal detachment. At the urging of his childhood friend Hiromichi Ome (青梅 広道, Hiromichi Ōme), he accepts a part-time position in the editorial department of Weekly Young Shout magazine. Though his unorthodox and combative demeanor frequently creates turmoil, Momoi's earnest passion and integrity profoundly influence the manga artists and editors around him, motivating them to achieve greater success.

== Media ==
=== Manga ===
Written and illustrated by Seiki Tsuchida, Henshū Ō was serialized in Shogakukan's seinen manga magazine Weekly Big Comic Spirits from 1993 to 1997. Shogakukan collected its chapters in sixteen tankōbon volumes, released from May 30, 1994, to December 19, 1997.

=== Drama ===
An 11-episode television drama adaptation was broadcast on Fuji TV from October 10 to December 19, 2000.

== Reception ==
In his book Dreamland Japan: Writings on Modern Manga, author Frederik L. Schodt characterized Henshū Ō as a highly sympathetic portrayal of manga editors, a profession he notes rarely receives credit and is often maligned. He praised its synthesis of "melodrama, comedy, and gags" with an informational core, as well as Tsuchida's realistic artwork. Schodt also highlighted its educational value for manga subculture terminology, aided by the author's explanatory footnotes.

Similarly, writer and translator Marc Bernabé commended the series. In contrast to the romanticized depiction in works like Bakuman, Bernabé found Henshū Ō to be a "crude and curiously realistic" examination that prompts reflection on the nature of commercial manga.

Manga artist Etsuko Mizusawa named Henshū Ō as one of their influences.

== See also ==
- Onaji Tsuki o Miteiru, another manga series by Seiki Tsuchida
- Yomawari Sensei, another manga series illustrated by Seiki Tsuchida
