= Moonlight Shadow: Tsuki ni Hoero =

Single by Akina Nakamori

from the album Shaker
- Language: Japanese
- English title: Moonlight Shadow: Howl at the Moon
- Released: August 7, 1996
- Recorded: 1996
- Genre: J-pop; dance-pop
- Length: 5:07
- Label: MCA Victor
- Composer: Tetsuya Komuro
- Lyricist: Toshihiko Takamizawa
- Producer: Tetsuya Komuro

Akina Nakamori singles chronology
"Tokyo Rose" (1995)	"Moonlight Shadow: Tsuki ni Hoero" (1996)	"Appetite" (1997)

"Moonlight Shadow: Tsuki ni Hoero" (MOONLIGHT SHADOW-月に吠えろ, Mūnraito Shadō - Tsuki ni Hoero; lit. "Moonlight Shadow: Howl at the Moon") is the 33rd single by Japanese entertainer Akina Nakamori. Written by Toshihiko Takamizawa and Tetsuya Komuro, the single was released on August 7, 1996, by MCA Victor. It was also the lead single from her 17th studio album Shaker.

== Background ==
"Moonlight Shadow: Tsuki ni Hoero" was Nakamori's second single collaboration with musician and composer Tetsuya Komuro, after her 1994 single "Aibu". The lyrics were written by Toshihiko Takamizawa of The Alfee. Following the release of this single, Komuro planned to produce an album for Nakamori, with a release date of October 1996, but this did not materialize.

== Chart performance ==
"Moonlight Shadow: Tsuki ni Hoero" peaked at No. 14 on Oricon's weekly singles chart and sold over 112,500 copies. It was also Nakamori's last single to be certified Gold by the RIAJ.

== Track listing ==
All lyrics are written by Toshihiko Takamizawa; all music is composed and arranged by Tetsuya Komuro.

Original release
No.	Title	Length
1.	"Moonlight Shadow: Tsuki ni Hoero" (Mūnraito Shadō - Tsuki ni Hoero (MOONLIGHT SHADOW-月に吠えろ; "Moonlight Shadow: Howl at the Moon"))	5:07
2.	"Moonlight Shadow: Tsuki ni Hoero" (Club Mix)	8:40
3.	"Moonlight Shadow: Tsuki ni Hoero" (Original Karaoke)	5:07
Total length:		18:58

== Charts ==
Chart (1996)	Peak position
Japan (Oricon)	14

== Certification ==
Region	Certification	Certified units/sales
Japan (RIAJ)	Gold	200,000^{^}
^{^} Shipments figures based on certification alone.
