= Kisei (Never Forget) =

Single by Akina Nakamori

from the album Spoon
- Language: Japanese
- English title: Homecoming (Never Forget)
- B-side: "Tsuki wa Aoku ('98 Remastered Version)"
- Released: February 11, 1998
- Recorded: 1997
- Genre: J-pop
- Length: 5:45
- Label: This One/Gauss Entertainment
- Composer: Atsuko
- Lyricist: Yasuhiro Suzu
- Producer: Akina Nakamori

Akina Nakamori singles chronology
"Appetite" (1997)	"Kisei (Never Forget)" (1998)	"Kon'ya, Nagareboshi" (1998)

"Kisei (Never Forget)" (帰省 〜Never Forget〜; lit. "Homecoming (Never Forget)") is the 35th single by Japanese entertainer Akina Nakamori. Written by Yasuhiro Suzu and Atsuko, the single was released on February 11, 1998, by Gauss Entertainment (a subsidiary of Daiichikosho) under the This One label. It was also the lead single from her 18th studio album Spoon.

== Background ==
"Kisei (Never Forget)" was Nakamori's first release under Gauss Entertainment, less than a year after departing from MCA Victor. It was used as the theme song of the YTV drama series Tsumetai Tsuki (冷たい月; lit. Cold Moon), which also starred Nakamori.

The B-side is a remastered version of "Tsuki wa Aoku" (月は青く; lit. "The Moon Is Blue"), which was originally from Nakamori's 1997 album Shaker.

Nakamori re-recorded "Kisei (Never Forget)" on her 2007 compilation album Ballad Best 25th Anniversary Selection.

== Chart performance ==
"Kisei (Never Forget)" peaked at No. 19 on Oricon's weekly singles chart and sold over 94,900 copies.

== Track listing ==
Original release
No.	Title	Lyrics	Music	Arrangement	Length
1.	"Kisei (Never Forget)" ((帰省 〜Never Forget〜; "Homecoming (Never Forget)"))	Yasuhiro Suzu; Atsuko	Suzu	Akira Senju	5:45
2.	"Tsuki wa Aoku ('98 Remastered Version)" ((月は青く('98 RE-MASTERED VERSION); "The Moon Is Blue"))	Mariko Okabe	Toshikazu Noda	Shingo Tamaki	5:08
3.	"Kisei (Never Forget)" (Instrumental)				5:45
Total length:					16:38

== Charts ==
Chart (1998)	Peak position
Japan (Oricon)	19
