= Yomawari Sensei =

Japanese manga series

- First tankōbon volume cover

夜回り先生
- Genre: Autobiographical; Drama
- Manga
- Written by: Osamu Mizutani
- Illustrated by: Seiki Tsuchida
- Published by: Shogakukan
- Imprint: Ikki Comix
- Magazine: Monthly Ikki
- Original run: February 25, 2005 – May 25, 2009
- Volumes: 9 + 2 extras
- icon

Yomawari Sensei (夜回り先生; lit. 'Night Patrol Teacher') is a Japanese autobiographical manga series written by Osamu Mizutani and illustrated by Seiki Tsuchida. It was serialized in Shogakukan's seinen manga magazine Monthly Ikki from February 2005 to May 2009, with its chapters collected in nine tankōbon volumes. The manga is based on Mizutani's autobiographical book of the same title published in 2004.

== Synopsis ==
Osamu Mizutani is a high school teacher working at a night school in Yokohama. By night, he seeks out vulnerable teenagers—runaways, recluses, and those struggling with drug addiction—who have been cast aside by society. Offering guidance and support, he walks alongside them in their darkest moments, earning him the nickname "The Night Patrol Teacher".

== Publication ==
Written by Osamu Mizutani and illustrated by Seiki Tsuchida, Yomawari Sensei is based on Mizutani's autobiographical book of the same title, released by Sanctuary Publishing on February 10, 2004 (re-released by Shogakukan on March 6, 2009). A previous story, subtitled Blanco (ブランコ, Buranko), was published in Shogakukan's seinen manga magazine Monthly Ikki on October 25, 2004; it was released as a collected volume on December 28, 2004.

Yomawari Sensei was serialized in Monthly Ikki from February 25, 2005, to May 25, 2009. Shogakukan collected its chapters in nine tankōbon volumes, released from September 30, 2005, to January 30, 2009; an additional volume, subtitled Tokubetsu-hen: Sayonara ga Ienakute (特別編 さよならが言えなくて; lit. 'Special Edition: I Can't Say Goodbye'), was released on May 29, 2009. Tsuchida died of liver cirrhosis on April 24, 2012. An additional story of Yomawari Sensei, subtitled Kibō-hen (希望編; lit. 'Hope Edition'), was released on June 29, 2012; it contains three chapters of a planned four-chapter unfinished story, and contributions by other manga artists.

=== Volumes ===
No.	Japanese release date	Japanese ISBN
1	September 30, 2005	978-4-09-188585-2
2	November 30, 2005	978-4-09-188592-0
3	April 28, 2006	978-4-09-188318-6
4	November 30, 2006	978-4-09-188345-2
5	April 27, 2007	978-4-09-188364-3
6	October 30, 2007	978-4-09-188378-0
7	February 29, 2008	978-4-09-188400-8
8	August 29, 2008	978-4-09-188423-7
9	January 30, 2009	978-4-09-188434-3
Extra 1	May 29, 2009	978-4-09-188457-2
Extra 2	June 29, 2012	978-4-09-188457-2

== See also ==
- Henshū Ō, another manga series by Seiki Tsuchida
- Onaji Tsuki o Miteiru, another manga series by Seiki Tsuchida
