= Onaji Tsuki o Miteiru =

Japanese manga series

- First tankōbon volume cover

同じ月を見ている
- Manga
- Written by: Seiki Tsuchida
- Published by: Shogakukan
- Magazine: Weekly Young Sunday
- Original run: 1998 – 2000
- Volumes: 7
- Live-action film
- Directed by: Kenta Fukasaku
- Written by: Junichi Mori
- Music by: Ikurō Fujiwara
- Released: November 19, 2005
- Runtime: 102 minutes
- icon

Onaji Tsuki o Miteiru (同じ月を見ている; 'The Moon Always Watching Over'), also known as Under the Same Moon, is a Japanese manga series written and illustrated by Seiki Tsuchida. It was serialized in Shogakukan's seinen manga magazine Weekly Young Sunday from 1998 to 2000, with its chapters collected in 7 tankōbon volumes. It was adapted into a live-action film, which premiered in Japan in November 2005.

== Plot ==
Gen "Don" Minahiro, Emi Coldman, and Tetsuya Kumakawa were three friends bound by a deep childhood connection. Don, who lived with his alcoholic father on welfare, possessed a strange and innate talent for art, which captivated Emi, the daughter of an ambassador who suffered from poor health. During their high school years, Tetsuya inadvertently caused a wildfire that resulted in the death of Emi's father. Don chose to remain silent, accepting the false accusation of arson, and was consequently sent to a juvenile detention facility.

After his release, Don was taken in by Yosaku Kaneko, a yakuza. Don's peculiar, straightforward personality, devoid of greed or hesitation, profoundly influenced Kaneko, who eventually decided to leave the criminal world. However, shortly after going straight, Kaneko was targeted and killed by Ogi Group assassin Onishi, who then began to pursue Don as well.

Having learned of the circumstances surrounding Don and Kaneko, Tetsuya, who had since entered medical school and promised a future with Emi, was driven to the brink of madness by his guilt and fear of Don's revenge. He pursued Don to confess the truth and seek redemption. Don received Tetsuya's confession with a smile. In a final act, Don sacrificed his own life to save the mortally wounded Onishi.

== Media ==
=== Manga ===
Written and illustrated by Seiki Tsuchida, Onaji Tsuki o Miteiru was serialized in Shogakukan's seinen manga magazine Weekly Young Sunday from 1998 to 2000. Shogakukan collected its chapters in seven tankōbon volumes, released from October 5, 1998, to April 5, 2000.

=== Live-action film ===
A live-action film adaptation premiered in Japan on November 19, 2005. It was directed by Kenta Fukasaku and written by Junichi Mori, starring Yosuke Kubozuka, Meisa Kuroki, Edison Chen, Taro Yamamoto, Matsuo Suzuki and Kyoko Kishida. It was distributed by Toei Company.

== Reception ==
The manga received the Excellence Award at the third Japan Media Arts Festival in 1999.

The live-action film debuted at eighth at the Japanese box office, and had earned $751,210.

== See also ==
- Henshū Ō, another manga series illustrated by Seiki Tsuchida
- Yomawari Sensei, another manga series illustrated by Seiki Tsuchida
