= 28th Japan Record Awards =

1986 Japanese music awards ceremony

- Date: 31 December 1986
- Venue: Nippon Budokan, Tokyo
- Hosted by: Takero Morimoto, Keiko Takeshita

Television/radio coverage
- Network: TBS

The 28th Annual Japan Record Awards took place at the Nippon Budokan in Chiyoda, Tokyo, 31 December 1986, starting at 6:30PM JST. The primary ceremonies were televised in Japan on TBS.

The audience rating was 29.8%. Akina Nakamori, who had won the grand prize in the 27th Japan Record Awards in 1985, won the grand prize again in the 28th Japan Record Awards in 1986. No female singer had previously won the grand prize twice in two years.

== Award winners ==
- Japan Record Award:
  - Akina Nakamori for "Desire"
- Best Vocalist:
  - Saburo Kitajima
- Best New Artist:
  - Shonentai
- Best Album:
  - Seiko Matsuda for "Supreme"

== See also ==
- 1986 in Japanese music
- 37th NHK Kōhaku Uta Gassen
