= Kon'ya, Nagareboshi =

Single by Akina Nakamori

from the album Spoon
- Language: Japanese
- English title: A Shooting Star Tonight
- B-side: "Arashi no Naka de"
- Released: May 21, 1998
- Recorded: 1997
- Genre: J-pop
- Length: 5:45
- Label: This One/Gauss Entertainment
- Composer: Keiko Utsumi
- Lyricist: Seriko Natsuno
- Producer: Akina Nakamori

Akina Nakamori singles chronology
"Kisei (Never Forget)" (1998)	"Kon'ya, Nagareboshi" (1998)	"Tomadoi" (1998)

"Kon'ya, Nagareboshi" (今夜、流れ星; lit. "A Shooting Star Tonight") is the 36th single by Japanese entertainer Akina Nakamori. Written by Seriko Natsuno and Keiko Utsumi, the single was released on May 21, 1998, by Gauss Entertainment under the This One label. It was also the second single from her 18th studio album Spoon.

The single peaked at No. 66 on Oricon's weekly singles chart and sold over 12,000 copies, becoming her lowest-charting single.

== Track listing ==
All lyrics are written by Seriko Natsuno.

Original release
No.	Title	Music	Arrangement	Length
1.	"Kon'ya, Nagareboshi" ((今夜、流れ星; "A Shooting Star Tonight"))	Keiko Utsumi	Miyabi Shirakawa	4:32
2.	"Arashi no Naka de" ((嵐の中で; "In the Storm"))	Origa	Kunihiko Ryo	4:20
3.	"Kon'ya, Nagareboshi" (Instrumental)			4:32
Total length:				13:24

== Charts ==
Chart (1998)	Peak position
Japan (Oricon)	66
