= The Heat (Musica Fiesta) =

Single by Akina Nakamori

from the album Resonancia
- Language: Japanese
- B-side: "Siesta (Koi no Mama de)"
- Released: May 2, 2002
- Recorded: 2002
- Studio: Be Born Studio; Sangmind Studio
- Genre: J-pop; Latin
- Length: 4:12
- Label: Kitty MME
- Composer: Uru
- Lyricist: Adya
- Producer: Uru

Akina Nakamori singles chronology
"It's Brand New Day" (2001)	"The Heat (Musica Fiesta)" (2002)	"Days" (2003)

"The Heat (Musica Fiesta)" is the 41st single by Japanese entertainer Akina Nakamori. Written by Adya and Uru, the single was released on May 2, 2002, by Universal Music Japan under the Kitty MME label. It was also the second single from her 20th studio album Resonancia.

== Background ==
"The Heat (Musica Fiesta)" was Nakamori's first release under Universal Music Japan and it coincided with the 20th anniversary of her career. It was also considered to be a homecoming, as MCA Victor, which was her label from 1993 to 1997, was merged with UMJ in May 2000. The song was recorded at Be Born Studio in Nerima and Sangmind Studio in Seoul, with Korean hip-hop group X-Large providing the rap vocals. It was used as the ending theme song of the TBS drama series Wonderful (ワンダフル, Wandafuru). The music video was shot in Tokyo and Spain.

== Chart performance ==
"The Heat (Musica Fiesta)" peaked at No. 20 on Oricon's weekly singles chart and sold over 14,700 copies, becoming Nakamori's first top-20 single since "Kisei (Never Forget)" in 1998.

== Track listing ==
All lyrics are written by Adya.

Original release
No.	Title	Music	Arrangement	Length
1.	"The Heat (Musica Fiesta)"	Uru	Uru	4:12
2.	"Siesta (Koi no Mama de)" ((Siesta 〜恋のままで〜; "Siesta (Stay in Love)"))	Justin	Justin	4:32
3.	"The Heat (Musica Fiesta)" (Instrumental)			4:13
4.	"Siesta (Koi no Mama de)" (Instrumental)			4:31
Total length:				17:28

== Charts ==
Chart (2002)	Peak position
Japan (Oricon)	20
