= Daiichi Kosho DK 472 =

Japanese aircraft engine

- Type: Aircraft engine
- National origin: Japan
- Manufacturer: Daiichi Kosho Company
- First run: circa 1992
- Major applications: Daiichi Kosho Whisper

The Daiichi Kosho DK 472 is a Japanese aircraft engine that was developed by the Daiichi Kosho Company in the early 1990s for powered paragliding. The company had been previously noted for producing electronics, particularly karaoke equipment.

== Design and development ==
The DK 472 was a custom-designed engine that was part of the manufacturer's plan to build a mass-market paramotor. The DK 472 was supplanted by a single cylinder design and then, when the market never developed into the size envisioned by the company, all engine production was ceased in circa 2003.

The DK 472 is a twin cylinder, horizontally-opposed, air-cooled, two stroke engine that produces 22 hp (16 kW). Early versions were direct drive using a small diameter 29 in (74 cm) propeller. Later versions used a belt reduction drive system and a larger propeller. Electric start was standard equipment.

== Applications ==
- Daiichi Kosho Beat
- Daiichi Kosho Whisper

== Specifications (DK 472) ==
Data from Cliche and Kitplanes

=== General characteristics ===
- Type: twin cylinder, horizontally-opposed, air-cooled, two stroke aircraft engine

=== Components ===
- Valvetrain: piston porting
- Oil system: premixed oil and fuel
- Cooling system: air
- Reduction gear: belt drive
- Electric start

=== Performance ===
- Power output: 22 hp (16 kW)
