= Rakka Ryūsui (song) =

Single by Akina Nakamori

from the album Best Finger 25th Anniversary Selection
- Language: Japanese
- English title: Falling Flower Running Water
- B-side: "Desire (Jōnetsu) (2005 Version)"
- Released: December 7, 2005
- Recorded: 2005
- Genre: J-pop
- Length: 4:08
- Label: Universal Sigma
- Composer: Kenji Hayashida
- Lyricist: Takashi Matsumoto

Akina Nakamori singles chronology
"Hajimete Deatta Hi no Yō ni" (2004)	"Rakka Ryūsui" (2005)	"Hana yo Odore" (2006)

"Rakka Ryūsui" (落花流水; lit. "Falling Flower Running Water") is the 45th single by Japanese entertainer Akina Nakamori. Written by Takashi Matsumoto and Kenji Hayashida, the single was released on December 7, 2005, by Universal Sigma. It was also the lead single from her compilation album Best Finger 25th Anniversary Selection.

== Background ==
"Rakka Ryūsui" was released a year and five months after Nakamori's previous single "Hajimete Deatta Hi no Yō ni". It was used as the theme song of the TV Tokyo drama special Tenka Sōran: Tokugawa Mitsuyo no Inbō (天下騒乱〜徳川三代の陰謀; lit. World Mayhem: Conspiracy of the Three Tokugawas). The B-side is a re-recording of Nakamori's 1986 hit single "Desire (Jōnetsu)".

== Chart performance ==
"Rakka Ryūsui" peaked at No. 43 on Oricon's weekly singles chart and sold over 5,000 copies.

== Track listing ==
Original release
No.	Title	Lyrics	Music	Arrangement	Length
1.	"Rakka Ryūsui" ((落花流水; "Falling Flower Running Water"))	Takashi Matsumoto	Kenji Hayashida	Masayuki Sakamoto	4:08
2.	"Desire (Jōnetsu) (2005 Version)" ((DESIRE -情熱- （2005年ヴァージョン）))	Yoko Aki	Kisaburō Suzuki	Hiroshi Uesugi	4:23
3.	"Rakka Ryūsui" (Instrumental)				4:08
4.	"Desire (Jōnetsu) (2005 Version)" (Instrumental)				4:23
Total length:					14:01

== Charts ==
Chart (2005)	Peak position
Japan (Oricon)	43

== Cover version ==
- Kenji Hayashida, original composer of the song, self-covered the song on his compilation album "Works" in 2009.
