= Akai Hana =

Single by Akina Nakamori

from the album Best Finger 25th Anniversary Selection
- Language: Japanese
- English title: Red Flower
- Released: May 12, 2004
- Recorded: 2004
- Genre: J-pop
- Length: 5:32
- Label: Utahime Records
- Composer: Kim Hyung-seok
- Lyricists: Kim Hyung-seok; Minako Kawae
- Producer: Satoshi Takebe

Akina Nakamori singles chronology
"Days" (2003)	"Akai Hana" (2004)	"Hajimete Deatta Hi no Yō ni" (2004)

"Akai Hana" (赤い花; lit. "Red Flower") is the 43rd single by Japanese entertainer Akina Nakamori. Written by Kim Hyung-seok and Minako Kawae, the single was released on May 12, 2004, by Utahime Records.

== Background ==
"Akai Hana" is a Japanese-language cover of South Korean singer Park Yong-ha's 2003 single "Cheoeum Geu Nalcheoleom" (처음 그 날처럼, lit. "Like the First Day"). It was also the first release through Nakamori's own label Utahime Records, with distribution by Universal Music Japan.

== Chart performance ==
"Akai Hana" peaked at No. 40 on Oricon's weekly singles chart and sold over 5,100 copies.

== Track listing ==
Original release
No.	Title	Lyrics	Music	Arrangement	Length
1.	"Akai Hana" ((赤い花; "Red Flower"))	Kim Hyung-seok; Minako Kawae	Kim	Satoshi Takebe	5:32
2.	"Akai Hana" (Karaoke)				5:29
Total length:					11:01

== Charts ==
Chart (2004)	Peak position
Japan (Oricon)	40
