= Desire (Jōnetsu) =

Single by Akina Nakamori

from the album CD'87
- Language: Japanese
- B-side: "La Bohème"
- Released: February 3, 1986
- Recorded: 1985
- Genre: J-pop; kayōkyoku; pop rock
- Length: 4:24
- Label: Reprise Records
- Composer: Kisaburō Suzuki
- Lyricist: Yoko Aki

Akina Nakamori singles chronology
"Solitude" (1985)	"Desire (Jōnetsu)" (1986)	"Gypsy Queen" (1986)

Music videos
- "Desire (Jōnetsu)" (Live) on YouTube

"Desire (Jōnetsu)" (Japanese: DESIRE -情熱-) is the 14th single by Japanese entertainer Akina Nakamori. Written by Yoko Aki and Kisaburō Suzuki, it was released on February 3, 1986, by Warner Pioneer through the Reprise label as the lead single from her third compilation album CD'87.

== Background ==
"Desire (Jōnetsu)" was used by Pioneer Corporation for their Private CD 500AV commercial featuring Nakamori. Live TV performances of the song featured one of Nakamori's signature looks: a bob wig and a stylized purple and brown kimono with high-heeled shoes.

Nakamori performed the song on the 37th Kōhaku Uta Gassen, making her fourth appearance on NHK's New Year's Eve special.

Nakamori has re-recorded "Desire (Jōnetsu)" for the 1995 compilation True Album Akina 95 Best, the 2002 self-cover compilation Utahime Double Decade and as the B-side of her 2005 single "Rakka Ryūsui". In 2010, she re-recorded the song for the pachinko machine CR Nakamori Akina: Utahime Densetsu ~Koi Moni Dome nara~ (CR中森明菜・歌姫伝説〜恋も二度目なら〜; CR Akina Nakamori: Utahime Legend ~If Love Is For the Second Time~).

== Chart performance ==
"Desire (Jōnetsu)" became Nakamori's 11th No. 1 on Oricon's singles chart and sold 516,000 copies, becoming the second best-selling single of 1986 in the country. It won the Grand Prix at the numerous awards including 28th Japan Record Awards, 1st Japan Gold Disc Award, and 13th FNS Music Festival.

== Track listing ==
All music is arranged by Kazuo Shiina.

7-inch single/Mini CD/digital download
No.	Title	Lyrics	Music	Length
1.	"Desire (Jōnetsu)" ((DESIRE -情熱-))	Yoko Aki	Kisaburō Suzuki	4:24
2.	"La Bohème"	Reiko Yukawa	Takashi Tsushimi	4:39
Total length:				9:03

Cassette
No.	Title	Length
1.	"Desire (Jōnetsu)"	4:24
2.	"Desire (Jōnetsu)" (Original Karaoke)
3.	"La Bohème"	4:39
4.	"La Bohème" (Original Karaoke)

Maxi single
No.	Title	Length
1.	"Desire (Jōnetsu)"	4:24
2.	"La Bohème"	4:39
3.	"Desire (Jōnetsu)" (Live version)
Total length:		13:32

== Charts ==
=== Weekly charts ===
Chart (1986)	Peak position
Japan (Oricon)	1
Japan (The Best Ten)	1
Japan (The Top Ten)	1

=== Year-end charts ===
Chart (1986)	Position
Japan (Oricon)	2
Japan (The Best Ten)	2
Japan (The Top Ten)	2

== Release history ==
Region	Date	Format	Label	Catalog Num.	Ref.
Japan	February 3, 1986	7-inch single	Warner Pioneer	L-1750	
Japan	June 25, 1988	Mini CD	Warner Music Japan	10SL144	
Japan	December 21, 1988	Cassette	Warner Music Japan	10L5-4053	
Japan	November 26, 1998	Maxi single	WEA Japan	WPC6-8671	
Japan	December 10, 2008	Digital download	Warner Music Japan		

== See also ==
- 1986 in Japanese music

Preceded by "Meu amor é..." (Akina Nakamori)	Japan Record Award Grand Prix; 1986	Succeeded by "Orokamono" (Masahiko Kondō)
