= Shaker (Akina Nakamori album) =

Studio album by Akina Nakamori
- Released: 21 March 1997; 4 December 2002 (as Shaker+3); 3 May 2017 (as Shaker+3 UHQCD)
- Recorded: 1996−1997
- Studios: Victor Studio; Sound Valley; Studio Take One; Art Works Studio; Sound on Sound Studios; Heart Beat Recording Studio; Sedic Audio Studio; One Voice Studio
- Genres: Art pop; trip hop; jazz
- Length: 55:34 (original); 70:40 (re-printed)
- Language: Japanese
- Label: MCA Victor
- Producer: Akina Nakamori

Akina Nakamori chronology
Vamp (1996)	Shaker (1997)	Spoon (1998)

Singles from Shaker
- 1. "Moonlight Shadow: Tsuki ni Hoero" Released: 7 August 1996; 2. "Appetite" Released: 21 February 1997

Shaker is the seventeenth studio album by Japanese singer-producer Akina Nakamori and third studio album to be released during the 1990s. It was released on 21 March 1997, by MCA Victor. The album includes lead singles "Moonlight Shadow: Tsuki ni Hoero" and "Appetite". It was Nakamori's final album released under MCA Victor, before her transfer to Gauss Entertainment label.

In 2002 was released re-printed version of the album Shaker+3 which includes the original version of "Moonlight Shadow", "Appetite" and B-side track "Sweet Suspicion", which was previously unreleased in the album recordings.

== Promotion ==
=== Singles ===
It consists of two previously released singles.

"Moonlight Shadow: Tsuki ni Hoero" is the thirty-third single written and produced by Tetsuya Komuro. It was released on 7 August 1996, her only single to be released in that year. It includes renewed arrangement with the slower intro start. The original version was included re-printed version of album, Shaker+3 and compilation album Utahime Densetsu: 90's Best under the Universal Music label. The single debuted at number 14 on the Oricon Single Weekly Charts.

"Appetite" is the thirty-fourth single written by Uki. It was released on 21 February 1997, it was her only single to be released in that year. It includes renewed arrangement with the heavy sound of the synthesizer in the beginning, instead of the original bass sound. The original version was included re-printed version of album, Shaker+3 and compilation albums Utahime Densetsu: 90's Best and All Time Best: Original. The single debuted at number 46 on the Oricon Single Weekly Charts and become final single to be released under MCA Records label.

== Stage performances ==
The album tracks "Tsuki ha Aoku", "Mangetsu", "Biyaku", "Yoru no Nioi", "Oishii Mizu" and "Akai Bara ga Yureta" has been performed once in the live tour Felicidad in 1997.

"Appetite" and "Moonlight Shadow" has been performed in the live tour Felicidad and Spoon in 1998, 'Music Fiesta in 2002 and The Last Destination in 2006.

== Chart performance ==
The album reached at number 14 on the Oricon Album Weekly Chart charted for the 5 consecutive weeks with the sales of 43,600 copies. During its re-release in 2023, it debut at number 91 on the Billboard Japan´s Album Weekly Charts.

== Track listing ==
Shaker track listing
No.	Title	Lyrics	Music	Arranger(s)	Length
1.	"Mangetsu (満月)"	Sho Saegusa	Kazuhisa Yamaguchi	Yamaguchi, Sumi Kazuhiro	5:28
2.	"Spicy Heart"	Ryo Mama	Toshihide Uno	Shouhei Narabe	4:11
3.	"Yoru no Nioi (夜の匂い)"	Mariko Okabe	Hirofumi Asamoto	Asamoto	4:48
4.	"Oishii Mizu (おいしい水)"	Okabe	Asamoto	Asamoto	5:37
5.	"Moonlight Shadow: Tsuki ni Hoero (月に吠えろ)" (album mix)	Toshihiko Takamizawa	Tetsuya Komuro	Komuro	5:33
6.	"Akai Bara ga Yureta (赤い薔薇が揺れた)"	Seriko Natsuno	Miki Watanabe	Shingo Tamaki	4:58
7.	"Appetite: Horror Plants Benjamin"	Natsuno	U-ki	U-ki	5:01
8.	"Yume Miruyouni Nemuritai (夢みるように眠りたい)"	Okabe	Hitoshi Chizawa	Itaru Sakota	4:06
9.	"Biyaku (桜)"	Natsuno	U-ki	U-ki	4:57
10.	"Kaze wo Dakishimete (風を抱き締めて)"	Yuuko Matsuzaki	Masanori Shimada	Shimada	5:36
11.	"Tsuki wa Aoku (月は青く)"	Okabe	Toshikazu Noda	Tamaki	5:13

Shaker+3
No.	Title	Lyrics	Music	Arranger(s)	Length
12.	"Moonlight Shadow"	Takamizawa	Komuro	Komuro	5:10
13.	"Appetite"	Natsuno	U-ki	U-ki	5:18
14.	"Sweet Suspicion"	Kanon Kuwa	Chizawa	Sakota	4:53

== Release history ==
Year	Format(s)	Serial number	Label(s)	Ref.
1997	CD	MVCD-38	MCA	
2002	CD	UMCK-1153	UMJ	
2017	UHQCD	UPCH-7271	UMJ	
2023	LP, CD	UPCY-7838, UPJY-9341/2	UMJ	

Notes:

- Re-releases since 2002 always includes additional 3 tracks, which were not included during its the first release time.
