= Hajimete Deatta Hi no Yō ni =

Single by Akina Nakamori

from the album Best Finger 25th Anniversary Selection
- Language: Japanese
- English title: Like the Day I First Met You
- Released: July 7, 2004
- Recorded: 2004
- Genre: J-pop
- Length: 4:33
- Label: Utahime Records
- Composer: Kim Hyung-seok
- Lyricists: Kim Hyung-seok; Gorō Matsui
- Producer: Satoshi Takebe

Akina Nakamori singles chronology
"Akai Hana" (2004)	"Hajimete Deatta Hi no Yō ni" (2004)	"Rakka Ryūsui" (2005)

"Hajimete Deatta Hi no Yō ni" (初めて出逢った日のように; lit. "Like the Day I First Met You") is the 44th single by Japanese entertainer Akina Nakamori. Written by Kim Hyung-seok and Gorō Matsui, the single was released on July 7, 2004, by Utahime Records.

== Background ==
Like Nakamori's previous single "Akai Hana", "Hajimete Deatta Hi no Yō ni" is a Japanese-language cover of South Korean singer Park Yong-ha's 2003 single "Cheoeum Geu Nalcheoleom" (처음 그 날처럼, lit. "Like the First Day"). The difference is that it has alternate Japanese lyrics by veteran lyricist Matsui. This marked the second time Nakamori released two versions of the same song as singles, after "Meu amor é..." and "Akaitori Nigeta" in 1986. "Hajimete Deatta Hi no Yō ni" was used as the theme song of NHK BS2's Japanese dub of the Korean drama series All In.

== Chart performance ==
"Hajimete Deatta Hi no Yō ni" peaked at No. 50 on Oricon's weekly singles chart and sold over 6,200 copies.

== Track listing ==
Original release
No.	Title	Lyrics	Music	Arrangement	Length
1.	"Hajimete Deatta Hi no Yō ni" ((初めて出逢った日のように; "Like the Day I First Met You"))	Kim Hyung-seok; Gorō Matsui	Kim	Satoshi Takebe	4:33
2.	"Hajimete Deatta Hi no Yō ni" (Karaoke)				4:30
Total length:					9:03

== Charts ==
Chart (2004)	Peak position
Japan (Oricon)	50
