= Nifty Corporation =

Japanese internet service provider

NIFTY Corporation ニフティ株式会社
- Type: Subsidiary
- Industry: Information and communication industry
- Founded: February 4, 1986
- Headquarters: Shinagawa, Tokyo, Japan
- Key people: Kenji Mitake (三竹 兼司), president
- Revenue: ¥66.833 billion (FY 2015, consolidated)
- Number of employees: 556 (March 31, 2007)
- Parent: Nojima (100%)
- Website: NIFTY Corporation (@ nifty)

Nifty Corporation, stylized as NIFTY Corporation (ニフティ株式会社) and @nifty (ニフティ), is one of the leading internet service providers (ISP) in Japan. The company was the largest online service provider, Nifty Serve, in Japan. With the spread of the Internet, it started internet service in 1996. In 1999, it absorbed Fujitsu's ISP, InfoWeb. In 2006, the online service was closed due to a decline in users. The company (TYO: 3828) went public in December 2006. It became a wholly owned subsidiary of Fujitsu and was delisted from the Tokyo Stock Exchange on 19 July 2016.

On 1 April 2017, Nifty was split into two companies. The old Nifty Corporation was renamed to Fujitsu Cloud Technologies Limited (Corporate Number: 7011101062005), which took over its cloud business, and its ISP and web services business was transferred to a newly incorporated entity named Nifty Corporation (Corporate Number: 7011101079619). At the same time, Fujitsu sold all of its stakes in the new Nifty Corporation to electronics retailer Nojima Corporation.

On 1 April 2024, Fujitsu Cloud Technologies was absorbed into Fujitsu and then dissolved.
