= Mariko Tone =

Mariko Tone 刀根麻理子
- Born: Mariko Tone 刀根 万里子; March 3, 1962 (age 64)
- Origin: Kawasaki, Kanagawa, Japan
- Genres: Post-disco, J-pop, electropop
- Occupations: Singer, composer, actor
- Label: Tokuma
- Website: www.mariko-tone.com/

Mariko Tone (刀根 麻理子, Tone Mariko; born March 3, 1962 in Kawasaki, Kanagawa, Japan) is a Japanese singer, actor and essayist. Tone also covers children's songs under the pseudonym Hanako Nohara. Tone sings in Japanese and, to a limited extent, in English.

One of her songs titled "Derringer" became an opening theme to anime series Cat's Eye.

== Personal life ==
Since September 2004, Tone has been married to Hiroshi Hirose, a hair stylist.

== Discography ==
=== Albums ===
- 1985: WITTY
- 1985: PURPLE ROSE
- 1986: Naturally
- 1987: JUST MY TONE
- 1987: FOR YOU… (No. 75 JP)
- 1988: PURELY
- 1990: Vois d L'ame (No. 96 JP)
- 1991: TRUE LOVE
- 1993: TRENTAINE

=== Compilation albums ===
- 1985: Mariko Brand
- 1986: LADY M -MARIKO BEST-
- 1988: Mariko Brand II Ballad Collection
- 1989: DANCE MIX
- 1989: BALLAD MIX
- 1990: 刀根麻理子ベストセレクション (Tone Mariko Best Collection)
- 2004: ゴールデン☆ベスト (Golden☆Best)
