= Ikurō Fujiwara =

Japanese composer (born 1958)

Ikurō Fujiwara 藤原 いくろう
- Born: 28 July 1958 (age 68); Yokohama, Japan
- Genres: J-pop, New Age, Healing Music
- Occupations: pianist, keyboardist, composer, producer, conductor, orchestral arranger
- Years active: 1991–present
- Labels: Teichiku Records; Being Inc.
- Website: Official website

YouTube information
- Channel: IKURO Fujiwara Official YouTube Channel
- Years active: 2020 -
- Subscribers: 659
- Views: 56.5 thousand
- Last updated: 4 August 2026

Ikurō Fujiwara (藤原いくろう, Fujiwara Ikurou; born 28 July 1958 in Kanagawa Prefecture, Yokohama, Japan) is a Japanese pianist, composer, conductor and musical producer signed under Being Inc. He is Pops Executive Producer in the Pacific Philharmonia Tokyo orchestra.

== Biography ==
Ikurō started learning piano and composing from an early age. He studied composition under Yoshio Hasegawa, Akira Kitamura, Hajime Kaburagi, Kiyohiko Kishima, and Tsuyoshi Yanagisawa; piano under Shihoko Uno, Kazuko Yasukawa, Michiko Jackson; conducting under Shigenobu Yamaoka and Konstantin D. Crimets. In 1976, Ikurō graduated from "Nihon University College of Art". In 1980s, his name appeared in the credit list of the various albums of the artist as arranger and keyboardist. At the beginning of 90's, he would focus his career more into composing and arranging music for the video gameseries Wizardry. In 1996, he was member of the Japanese band W's as keyboardist, composer and arranger.

From 1998, he has been active as an orchestral conductor and arranger for symphonic live series started firstly for Akina Nakamori, in the recent years by public well known for Mai Kuraki, Aska and Luna Sea. Since the 2000s, he started to release his original albums under subtitles "Densetsu" and "Eternal Animation Healing" music; composed soundtracks for number of domestic television series and theatrical movies in Shanghai, Singapore and Japan. His original works have been well received by critics.

In 2002, Ikuro's instrumental piece "Deep Sea" was used as background music for the South Korean television series Winter Sonata. He performed it 5 years later, in 2007 at Seoul Women's Plaza.

The music in the 2008's movie Painted Skin has received 2 Hong Kong Film Awards for Best Original Film Score and Best Original Film Song (as for the first time in the history of Japanese music), and 1 nomination on Changchun Film Festival for the Best Music.

In 2020, he launched one-day live show "KURO Fujiwara New Year's Piano Live 2020 "Yuki no Hana" held in Tokyo with the vocal guests Yumi Shizukusa from the same agency. Before Shizukusa's retirement, it was marked to be her final live performance to be seen. In 2021, Ikuro released his first vocal recording song under EP title "Yokohama Star Dust" in digital format.

== Discography ==
As of 2023, he has released 17 studio albums, 3 digital albums, 4 compilation album and 1 DVD.

=== Studio albums ===
	Release date	Title	CD code
1st	2002	Mizu no Densetsu (水の伝説)	TECD-25473
2nd	2002	Kaze no Densetsu (風の伝説)	TECD-25474
3rd	2002	Hana no Densetsu (花の伝説)	TECD-25475
4th	2002	Tsuki no Densetsu (月の伝説)	TECD-25472
5th	2002	Ai no Densetsu (愛の伝説)	TECD-254746
6th	2002	Eternal Love Animation Healing Music	MJCG-80107
7th	2002	Eternal Impression Animation Healing Music	MJCG-80108
8th	2002	Eternal Courage Animation Healing Music	MJCG-80109
9th	2003	Kino (КИНО)	BNTM-3
10th	2004	Machi (町)	YRCN-11035
11th	2008	Collage	YRCN-11053
12th	2009	Sutekina Kyuujitsu (素敵な休日)	TFC1991~1993
13th	2013	Quatre saisons series Scénario de la saison: Automne	JBCZ-9001
14th	2014	Quatre saisons series Scénario de la saison: Hiver	JBCZ-9002
15th	2014	Quatre saisons series Scénario de la saison: Printemps	JBCZ-9009
16th	2014	Quatre saisons series Scénario de la saison: Été	JBCZ-9010
17th	2014	Symphonic Luna Sea: Reboot	JBCZ-9029

=== Compilation albums ===
	Release date	Title	Code
1st	2005	10nin Pianist (10人のピアニスト)	OWCP-2001
2nd	2005	Tenderness～best works～	YRCN-11048
3rd	2005	10nin Pianist Ivory (10人のピアニスト)	B000BR2NNY
4th	2005	Feel piano	B000ACZX6O
5th	2005	Yorokobi no uta: Toubeidon to noumin-tachi (よろこびのうた～藤兵衛ドンと農民たち)	B000ACZX6O

=== Digital EP ===
	Release date	Title
1st	2021	IKURO Fujiwara SELECTION: Mon Cheri
2nd	2021	Yokohama Star Dust
3rd	2023	Happy Birthday: Taisetsuna Kimi he

=== Movie soundtracks compositions ===
- Dear Friends (2007)
- Painted Skin (2008)
- Yatterman (2009)
- Nisesatsu (2009)
- Omuraisu (2012)
- Legend of the Naga Pearls (2017)
- Mural(2022)

=== Television series compositions ===
- 69 sixty nine (2004)
- Curtain Call (2004)
- Itoshii Kimi he (愛し君へ) (2004)
- Onaji Tsuki wo Miteiru (同じ月を見ている) (2005)
- Cao Cao (2011–2012)
- Noble Aspirations (2016)

=== Game soundtracks composition ===
- Wizardry: The First Episode - Suffering of the Queen (Game Boy,1991)
- Wizardry: The Second Episode - Curse of the Ancient Emperor (Game Boy,1992)
- Wizardry: The Third Episode - Scripture of the Dark (Game Boy,1993)
- Tenchi Muyo!: Toko Muyo (Sega Saturn,1997)
- Wizardry Dimguil Original Sound Track (1998)
- Dog of Bay (PlayStation 2, 2000)

=== DVD ===
- Fujisan Shinshō VOL. 1: Fujiwara Ikurō healing version (富士山心象 VOL.1 藤原いくろう ヒーリング・バージョン) (2002)
- Yoshiki Symphonic Concert 2002with Tokyo City Phillharmonic Orchestra (2002)
- Mai Kuraki Symphonic Live -Opus 1- (2013)
- Mai Kuraki Symphonic Live -Opus 2- (2014)
- Mai Kuraki Symphonic Live -Opus 3- (2015)
- Ai to Yuuki no 25 Shuunen Linen Fire Emblem San (愛と勇気の25周年記念 ファイアーエムブレム祭) (2016)
- Piano Anthology: Melody of Luna Sea (2016)
- Live Movie from Billboard Classics 20th Anniversary Mai Kuraki Premium Symphonic Concert 2019 (2021) - released as part of the album Unconditional Love as Limited B version with DVD disc.
- Mai Kuraki Premium Symphonic Concert 2022 (2023)

Note: Aside of Fujisan Shinshō, Ikuro is filmed and credited in the footages as a conductor and orchestral arranger.

== List of contribution to artist ==
- Akina Nakamori
- Yoshie Kashiwabara
- Shonentai
- Kaori Kozai
- Marcia Kazue Otsuru
- Mai Kuraki
- Mariko Tone
- Hiroko Moriguchi
- Harumi Inoue
- Hiroko Kasahara
- Hiroko Kurumizawa
- Masatoshi Ono

== List of produced artist ==
Listed for symphonic concerts

- Akina Nakamori (1998)
- Asato Shizuki (2001)
- Mayo Okamoto (2001)
- Yoshiki (2002)
- Miki Imai (2004)
- Aska (2005, 2008, 2018, 2022)
- Kirito (2006)
- Shinichi Mori (2006)
- Ayaka Hirahara (2007)
- Ichirou Mizuki (2009)
- Garnet Crow (2010)
- Mai Kuraki (2012, 2014, 2015, 2022, 2023)
- Luna Sea (2015)
- Koda Kumi (2022)
- Tetsuya Komuro (2022)
- Beyooooonds (2023)
- Hitomi Yaida (2023)
