= Paramotor =

Harness and propulsion in a powered paraglider

Paramotor

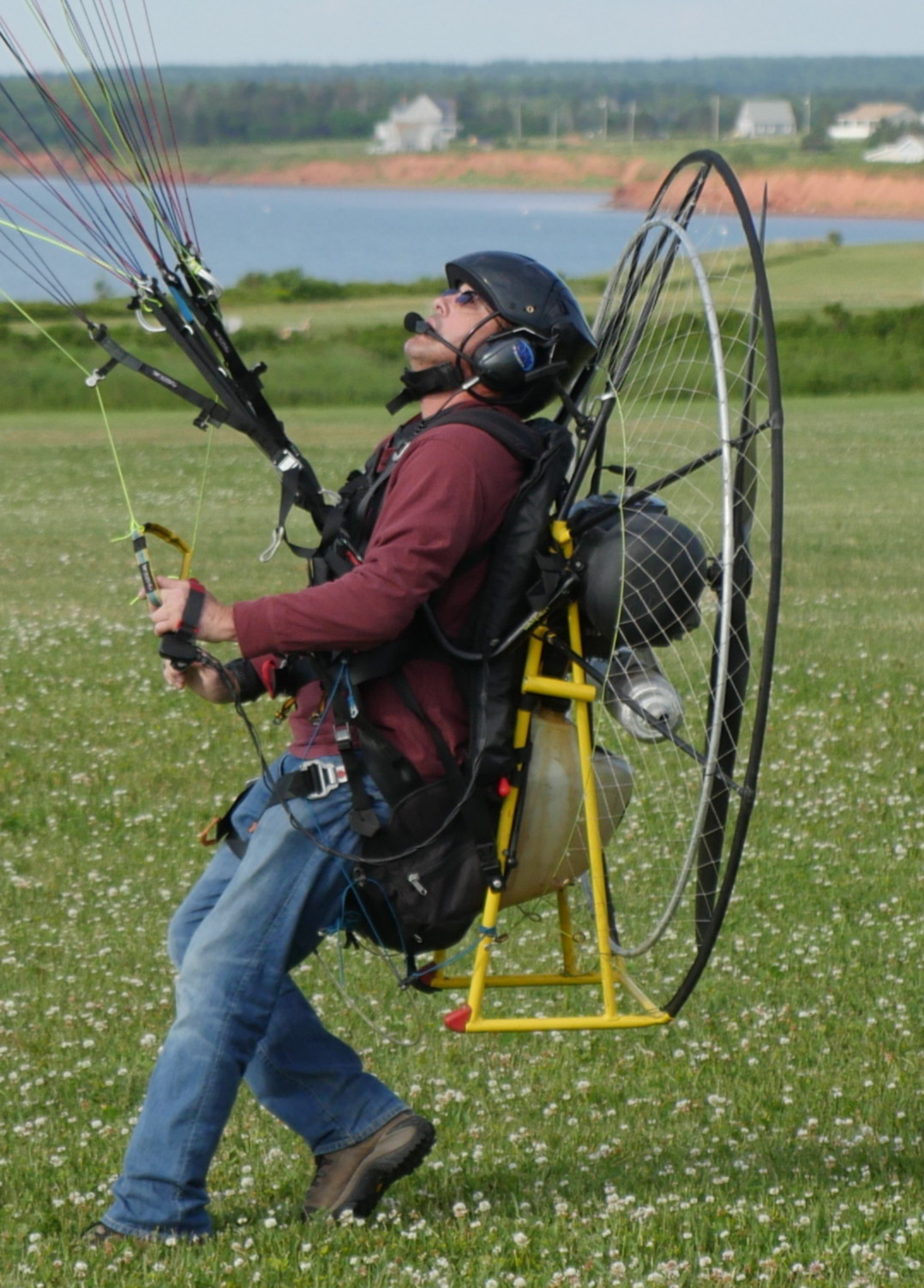
Paramotor pilot "reverse launching", showing how seat bottom moves to allow for easy ground handling

Paramotor is the generic name for the harness and propulsive portion of a powered paraglider ("PPG"). There are two basic types of paramotors: foot launch and wheel launch.

Foot launch models consist of a frame with harness, fuel tank, engine, and propeller. A hoop with protective netting primarily keeps lines out of the propeller. The unit is worn like a large backpack to which a paraglider is attached through carabiners.

Wheel launch units either come as complete units with their own motor and propeller, or as an add-on to a foot-launch paramotor. They usually have three (trike) or four (quad) wheels, with seats for one or two occupants. These are distinct from powered parachutes which are generally much heavier, more powerful, and have different steering.

The term was first used by Englishman Mike Byrne in 1980 and popularized in France around 1986 when La Mouette began adapting power to the then-new paraglider wings.

Power plants are almost exclusively small two-stroke internal combustion engines, between 80 cc and 350 cc, that burn a mixture of gasoline and oil. These engines are favored for their high thrust-to-weight ratio of engine plus fuel; they use approximately 3.7 litres (1 US Gal.) of fuel per hour depending on paraglider efficiency, the weight of unit and the pilot, and weather conditions. At least one manufacturer produces a 4-stroke model with better fuel efficiency, which produces strong thrust at lower rotational speeds (RPM). Electrically powered units are also made, though flight duration is limited by battery weight. Csaba Lemak built the first electric PPG, flying it first on 13 June 2006. Wankel rotary engined paramotors are also available, but rare.

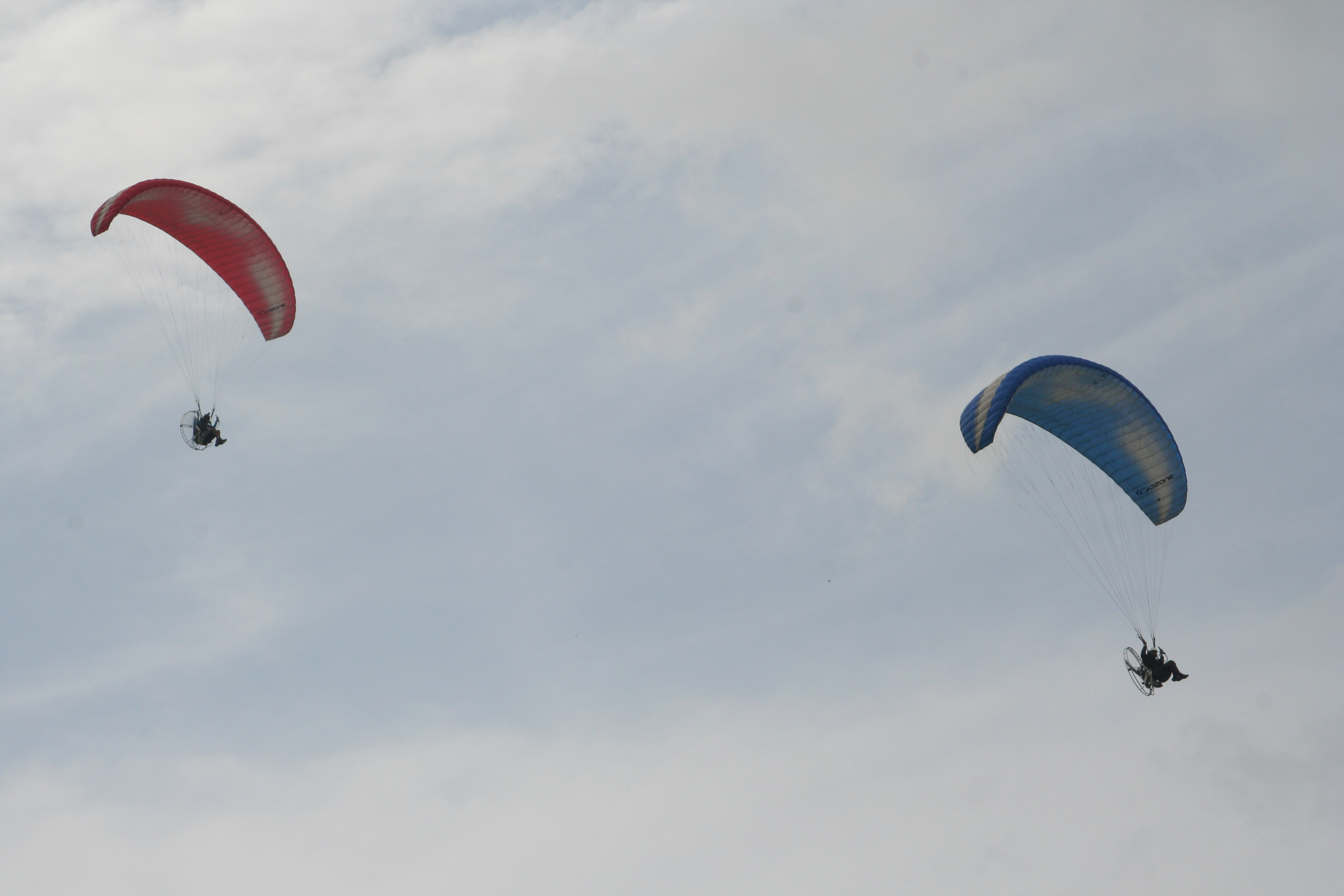
Two Vietnamese paramotorist flying (Bien Hoa Air Base, Vietnam, 2011).

Paramotors generally weigh between 40 lb (18 kg) and 75 lb (34 kg) with an average around 50 lb (23 kg). The size of the required paraglider wing and engine depend on the weight of the pilot: the heavier the pilot, the larger the size of the wing and higher the thrust needed to launch. Most people in reasonably good health can foot-launch a paramotor; some pilots with artificial joints foot-launch. People with issues with the physical aspect of foot launching may opt to add a trike or quad to their paramotor, a platform to which the paramotor can be attached so it can be launched rolling on wheels.

The pilot controls thrust via a hand-held throttle and steers using the wing's brake toggles, stabilo steering, weight shifting or a combination of the three. Unlike unpowered paragliding, neither launching from a high elevation nor catching thermal columns to ascend are required.

Technology is also enhancing paramotoring with for instance smart glasses, head up display showing altitude, speed, and flight time in the field of view during the paramotor flight.

== See also ==
- Paratrike
