= Daiichi Kosho Company =

Japanese electronics and aircraft manufacturer

Daiichi Kosho Co., Ltd.
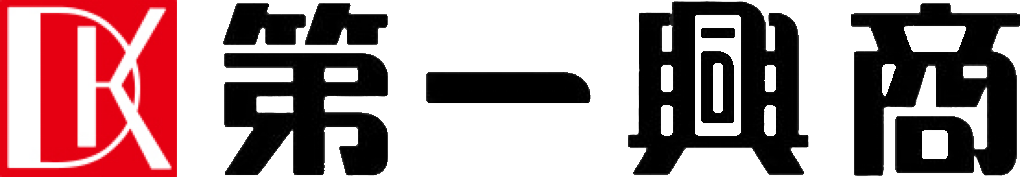
- Company type: kabushiki gaisha
- Traded as: TYO: 7458
- Industry: Electronics; Aerospace; Music; Karaoke rooms (under the name BIG ECHO) & Restaurants; Real estate
- Founded: 1973
- Headquarters: Shinagawa, Tokyo, Japan
- Products: Karaoke; Paramotors; CDs and DVDs
- Subsidiaries: Nippon Crown Co., Ltd. Tokuma Japan Communications Co., Ltd.
- Website: www.dkkaraoke.co.jp

Daiichi Kosho Co., Ltd. (株式会社第一興商) is a Japanese electronics and aircraft manufacturer that was founded in 1973 and is headquartered in Tokyo. As an electronics manufacturer the company specializes in karaoke equipment.

== History ==
Between about 1992 and 2003 the company branched into the design and manufacture of paramotor harnesses, canopies and engines. The company produced several designs of aircraft engines, including the DK 472. The company's foray into aircraft production did not result in the projected market size and the company exited the field in about 2003.

In 1997, Daiichi Kosho entered into the Japanese music industry through the launching of its own record label, Gauss Entertainment (which merged with now-subsidiary Tokuma Japan Communications in 2005). In 2001, the company acquired two other record labels: Nippon Crown (former subsidiary of the Mitsubishi keiretsu) and Tokuma Japan Communications (former subsidiary of Tokuma Shoten). On April 1, 2010, Nippon Crown and Tokuma Japan Communications formed the music distribution company Crown Tokuma.

== Aircraft ==
Summary of aircraft built by Daiichi Kosho
Model name	First flight	Number built	Type
Daiichi Kosho Beat	1992		Paramotor
Daiichi Kosho Whisper	1999		Paramotor
