= 1970 in Japanese music =

In 1970 (Shōwa 45), Japanese music was released on records, and there were charts, awards, contests and festivals.

During that year, Japan continued to have the second largest music market in the world.

== Awards, contests and festivals ==
The 13th Osaka International Festival (Japanese: 大阪国際フェスティバル) was held from 14 April to 14 May 1970. The 2nd contest of what subsequently became known as the Yamaha Popular Song Contest was held on 5 November 1970. The 1st Japan Music Awards were held on 9 November 1970. The final of the 1st contest of what subsequently became known as the World Popular Song Festival was held on 22 November 1970. The 12th Japan Record Awards were held on 31 December 1970. The 21st NHK Kōhaku Uta Gassen was held on 31 December 1970.

The 19th Otaka prize was won by Michio Mamiya.

== Exhibitions ==
There was music at Expo '70.

== Number one singles ==
=== Oricon ===
The following reached number 1 on the weekly Oricon Singles Chart:

Issue date	Song	Artist(s)
5 January	"Kuroneko no Tango"	Osamu Minagawa
12 January	"Kuroneko no Tango"	Osamu Minagawa
19 January	"Kuroneko no Tango"	Osamu Minagawa
26 January	"Kuroneko no Tango"	Osamu Minagawa
2 February	"Kuroneko no Tango"	Osamu Minagawa
9 February	"Kuroneko no Tango"	Osamu Minagawa
16 February	"Awazu ni Aishite"	Hiroshi Uchiyamada and Cool Five
23 February	"Awazu ni Aishite"	Hiroshi Uchiyamada and Cool Five
2 March	"Awazu ni Aishite"	Hiroshi Uchiyamada and Cool Five
9 March	"Shiroi Chō no Samba"	Kayoko Moriyama
16 March	"Shiroi Chō no Samba"	Kayoko Moriyama
23 March	"Shiroi Chō no Samba"	Kayoko Moriyama
30 March	"Onna no Blues"	Keiko Fuji
6 April	"Onna no Blues"	Keiko Fuji
13 April	"Onna no Blues"	Keiko Fuji
20 April	"Onna no Blues"	Keiko Fuji
27 April	"Onna no Blues"	Keiko Fuji
4 May	"Onna no Blues"	Keiko Fuji
11 May	"Onna no Blues"	Keiko Fuji
18 May	"Onna no Blues"	Keiko Fuji
25 May	"Keiko no Yume wa Yoru Hiraku"	Keiko Fuji
1 June	"Keiko no Yume wa Yoru Hiraku"	Keiko Fuji
8 June	"Keiko no Yume wa Yoru Hiraku"	Keiko Fuji
15 June	"Keiko no Yume wa Yoru Hiraku"	Keiko Fuji
22 June	"Keiko no Yume wa Yoru Hiraku"	Keiko Fuji
29 June	"Keiko no Yume wa Yoru Hiraku"	Keiko Fuji
6 July	"Keiko no Yume wa Yoru Hiraku"	Keiko Fuji
13 July	"Keiko no Yume wa Yoru Hiraku"	Keiko Fuji
20 July	"Keiko no Yume wa Yoru Hiraku"	Keiko Fuji
27 July	"Keiko no Yume wa Yoru Hiraku"	Keiko Fuji
3 August	"Ai wa Kizutsuki Yasuku"	Hide & Rosanna
10 August	"Ai wa Kizutsuki Yasuku"	Hide & Rosanna
17 August	"Ai wa Kizutsuki Yasuku"	Hide & Rosanna
24 August	"Ai wa Kizutsuki Yasuku"	Hide & Rosanna
31 August	"Ai wa Kizutsuki Yasuku"	Hide & Rosanna
7 September	"Tegami"	Saori Yuki
14 September	"Tegami"	Saori Yuki
21 September	"Tegami"	Saori Yuki
28 September	"Tegami"	Saori Yuki
5 October	"Tegami"	Saori Yuki
12 October	"Tegami"	Saori Yuki
19 October	"The Lovers of the World"; Japanese title: "Otoko no Sekai" (男の世界; lit. "The World of the Man")	Jerry Wallace
26 October	"The Lovers of the World"; Japanese title: "Otoko no Sekai" (男の世界; lit. "The World of the Man")	Jerry Wallace
2 November	"The Lovers of the World"; Japanese title: "Otoko no Sekai" (男の世界; lit. "The World of the Man")	Jerry Wallace
9 November	"Kyōto no Koi"	Yūko Nagisa
16 November	"Kyōto no Koi"	Yūko Nagisa
23 November	"Kyōto no Koi"	Yūko Nagisa
30 November	"Kyōto no Koi"	Yūko Nagisa
7 December	"Kyōto no Koi"	Yūko Nagisa
14 December	"Kyōto no Koi"	Yūko Nagisa
21 December	"Kyōto no Koi"	Yūko Nagisa
28 December	"Kyōto no Koi"	Yūko Nagisa

=== Cash Box ===
The following reached number 1 according to the weekly singles chart published in Cash Box:

- 19 September, 26 September, 3 October, 10 October, 17 October, 24 October and 31 October: Tegami - Saori Yuki
- 7 November, 14 November, 21 November, 28 November, 5 December, 12 December and 19 December: Kyōto no Koi - Yūko Nagisa

International

The following reached number 1 according to the weekly international singles chart published in Cash Box:

- 3 January, 17 January, 24 January, 31 January and 7 February: Kuroneko no Tango - Osamu Minagawa
- 7 March, 14 March and 21 March: Awazu ni Aishite - Hiroshi Uchiyamada and Cool Five
- 28 March: Shiroi Chō no Samba - Kayoko Moriyama
- 18 April, 25 April, 2 May, 9 May, 16 May, 23 May, 30 May and 6 June: Onna no Blues - Keiko Fuji
- 13 June, 20 June, 27 June, 11 July, 18 July and 25 July: Keiko no Yume wa Yoru Hiraku - Keiko Fuji

Local

The following reached number 1 according to the weekly local singles chart published in Cash Box:

- 3 January, 17 January, 24 January, 31 January, 7 February, 7 March, 14 March, 21 March and 28 March: Dolif No Zundoko Bushi - The Dolifters
- 18 April, 25 April, 2 May and 9 May: Koi Hitosuji - Shinichi Mori
- 16 May, 23 May, 30 May, 6 June, 13 June and 20 June: Anata Nara Doosuru - Ayumi Ishida
- 27 June and 11 July: Yottsu No Onegai - Naomi Chiaki
- 18 July and 25 July: Keiken - Mari Henmi

Local single

The following reached number 1 according to the weekly "local single" chart published in Cash Box:

- 29 August and 5 September: Ai wa Kizutsuki Yasuku - Hide & Rosanna

A "foreign origin single" chart was published on 22 August and 5 September.

== Number one albums and LPs ==
Cash Box

The following reached number 1 on the Cash Box chart:

- 24 January and 7 February: Julie - Kenji Sawada
- 9 May: Betsy & Chris Folk Album (Japanese: フォーク・アルバム) - Betsy & Chris
- 16 May: Peter/Ushinawareta Shinwa (Japanese: 失われた神話) - Peter
- 13 June: Ryoko Moriyama Golden Album - Ryoko Moriyama
- 15 August and 22 August: Shinjuku No Onna/Enka No Hoshi, Fuji Keiko No Subete - Keiko Fuji
- 29 August, 5 September, 19 September, 3 October, 10 October, 31 October and 7 November: Onna No Blues - Keiko Fuji
- 19 December: Enka No Kyooen/Kiyoshi To Keiko (Japanese: 演歌の競演 清と圭子) - Keiko Fuji and Kiyoshi Maekawa

Oricon

The following reached number 1 on the Oricon LP chart:

- 5 January, 19 January, 26 January, 1 February, 8 February, 15 February, 22 February, 2 March, 9 March and 23 March: Hana To Namida (Japanese: 花と涙/森進一のすべて) - Shinichi Mori
- 12 January: Ikebukuro No Yoru / Aoe Mina No Subete (Japanese: 池袋の夜/青江三奈のすべて) - Mina Aoe
- 16 March: Kage Wo Shitaite (Japanese: 影を慕いて) - Shinichi Mori
- 30 March, 6 April, 13 April, 20 April, 27 April, 4 May, 11 May, 18 May, 25 May, 1 June, 8 June, 15 June, 22 June, 6 July, 13 July, 20 July, 27 July, 3 August and 10 August: Shinjuku No Onna/Enka No Hoshi, Fuji Keiko No Subete - Keiko Fuji
- 17 August, 24 August, 31 August, 7 September, 14 September, 21 September, 28 September, 5 October, 12 October, 19 October, 26 October, 2 November, 9 November, 16 November, 23 November, 30 November and 7 December: Onna No Blues - Keiko Fuji
- 14 December, 21 December and 28 December: Enka No Kyooen/Kiyoshi To Keiko (Japanese: 演歌の競演/清と圭子) - Keiko Fuji and Kiyoshi Maekawa

== Annual charts ==
Osamu Minagawa's Kuroneko no Tango was number 1 in the Cash Box annual singles chart, and the Oricon annual singles chart. Keiko Fuji's Keiko no Yume wa Yoru Hiraku was number 1 in the annual singles chart published in Billboard.

== Film and television ==
The music of Apart from Life, by Teizo Matsumura, won the 25th Mainichi Film Award for Best Music.

== Classical music ==
The Kanagawa Philharmonic Orchestra was founded.
The Japanese conductor Seiji Ozawa is named the music director of the San Francisco Symphony Orchestra.

== Jukeboxes ==
This year was the approximate start of a jukebox boom. There were 11,000 jukeboxes.

== Magazines ==
Music Labo was first published in 1970.

== Debuts ==
- 10 November: Miki Hirayama released Beautiful Yokohama

== Other singles released ==
- 20 March: Tokai by The Tigers
- 5 April: Dounika Narusa by Hiroshi Kamayatsu
- 1 July: Subarashii Ryoko (The Free Travel) by The Tigers
- 10 August: X+Y=LOVE (ja) by Naomi Chiaki
- 20 November: Chikai No Ashita (Promise For Future/Nothing But Departure) by The Tigers

== Other albums released ==
- Happy End by Happy End
- Anywhere by Flower Travellin' Band
- The World of Maki Asakawa by Maki Asakawa
- Kirikyogen by Kuni Kawachi
- 15 December: Jiyu To Akogare To Yujo (Japanese: 自由と憧れと友情) (Freedom, Hope & Friendship) by The Tigers

== See also ==
- Timeline of Japanese music
- 1970 in Japan
- 1970 in music
- w:ja:1970年の音楽
