= 1969 in Japanese music =

In 1969 (Shōwa 44), Japanese music was released on records, and there were charts, awards, contests and festivals.

During that year, Japan had the second largest music market in the world, and more than 118 million records were manufactured there.

== Awards, contests and festivals ==
The 12th Osaka International Festival (Japanese: 大阪国際フェスティバル) was held from 14 April to 2 May 1969. The 1st contest of what subsequently became known as the Yamaha Popular Song Contest was held on 23 November 1969. The 11th Japan Record Awards were held on 31 December 1969. The 20th NHK Kōhaku Uta Gassen was held on 31 December 1969.

The 18th Otaka prize was won by Takekuni Hirayoshi. The Suntory Music Award was founded in 1969.

== Performances ==
The Tigers performed on 3 April 1969. The Folk guerrilla concerts were held in 1969.

== Number one singles ==
=== Oricon ===
The following reached number 1 on the weekly Oricon Singles Chart:

Issue date	Song	Artist(s)
6 January	"Koi no Kisetsu"	Pinky & Killers
13 January	"Koi no Kisetsu"	Pinky & Killers
20 January	"Koi no Kisetsu"	Pinky & Killers
27 January	"Those Were the Days"; Japanese title: "Kanashiki Tenshi" (悲しき天使; lit. "Sad Angel")	Mary Hopkin
3 February	"Namida no Kisetsu" (Japanese: 涙の季節)	Pinky & Killers
10 February	"Blue Light Yokohama"	Ayumi Ishida
17 February	"Blue Light Yokohama"	Ayumi Ishida
24 February	"Blue Light Yokohama"	Ayumi Ishida
3 March	"Blue Light Yokohama"	Ayumi Ishida
10 March	"Blue Light Yokohama"	Ayumi Ishida
17 March	"Blue Light Yokohama"	Ayumi Ishida
24 March	"Blue Light Yokohama"	Ayumi Ishida
31 March	"Blue Light Yokohama"	Ayumi Ishida
7 April	"Blue Light Yokohama"	Ayumi Ishida
14 April	"Yoake no Scat"	Saori Yuki
21 April	"Yoake no Scat"	Saori Yuki
28 April	"Yoake no Scat"	Saori Yuki
5 May	"Yoake no Scat"	Saori Yuki
12 May	"Yoake no Scat"	Saori Yuki
19 May	"Yoake no Scat"	Saori Yuki
26 May	"Yoake no Scat"	Saori Yuki
2 June	"Yoake no Scat"	Saori Yuki
9 June	"Minatomachi Blues"	Shinichi Mori
16 June	"Minatomachi Blues"	Shinichi Mori
23 June	"Minatomachi Blues"	Shinichi Mori
30 June	"Minatomachi Blues"	Shinichi Mori
7 July	"Minatomachi Blues"	Shinichi Mori
14 July	"Kinjirareta Koi"	Ryoko Moriyama
21 July	"Kinjirareta Koi"	Ryoko Moriyama
28 July	"Kinjirareta Koi"	Ryoko Moriyama
4 August	"Kinjirareta Koi"	Ryoko Moriyama
11 August	"Kinjirareta Koi"	Ryoko Moriyama
18 August	"Kinjirareta Koi"	Ryoko Moriyama
25 August	"Kinjirareta Koi"	Ryoko Moriyama
1 September	"Kinjirareta Koi"	Ryoko Moriyama
8 September	"Ikebukuro no Yoru"	Mina Aoe
15 September	"Ikebukuro no Yoru"	Mina Aoe
22 September	"Ikebukuro no Yoru"	Mina Aoe
29 September	"Ikebukuro no Yoru"	Mina Aoe
6 October	"Ikebukuro no Yoru"	Mina Aoe
13 October	"Ikebukuro no Yoru"	Mina Aoe
20 October	"Ningyō no Ie"	Mieko Hirota
27 October	"Ningyō no Ie"	Mieko Hirota
3 November	"Ningyō no Ie"	Mieko Hirota
10 November	"Kuroneko no Tango"	Osamu Minagawa
17 November	"Kuroneko no Tango"	Osamu Minagawa
24 November	"Kuroneko no Tango"	Osamu Minagawa
1 December	"Kuroneko no Tango"	Osamu Minagawa
8 December	"Kuroneko no Tango"	Osamu Minagawa
15 December	"Kuroneko no Tango"	Osamu Minagawa
22 December	"Kuroneko no Tango"	Osamu Minagawa
29 December	"Kuroneko no Tango"	Osamu Minagawa

== Number one albums and LPs ==
Cash Box

The following reached number 1 on the Cash Box albums chart:

- 4 January, 18 January, 25 January, 8 February and 15 February: Human Renascence - The Tigers
- 22 February, 1 March, 8 March, 15 March and 22 March: The Beatles - The Beatles
- 29 March, 5 April, 19 April, 26 April, 3 May and 17 May: Folk Crusaders Good-Bye Concert (Folk Crusaders Farewell Concert) (Japanese: フォークルさよならコンサート) - The Folk Crusaders
- 10 May and 24 May: Paul Mauriat Custom Deluxe (Japanese: ポール・モーリア・カスタム・デラックス ) - Le Grand Orchestre de Paul Mauriat
- 31 May, 7 June and 14 June: Sam Taylor/Blue Light Yokohama - Sam Taylor
- 21 June and 28 June: Ryoko Moriyama/Idol-O Utau (Japanese: アイドルを歌う) - Ryoko Moriyama
- 12 July, 19 July, 26 July, 2 August, 9 August, 16 August, 23 August, 30 August, 6 September, 13 September, 20 September, 27 September, 4 October, 11 October, 18 October, 25 October and 1 November: Ryoko Moriyama/College Folk Album (Japanese: カレッジフォークアルバム) - Ryoko Moriyama
- 8 November, 15 November, 22 November, 29 November and 13 December: Ryoko Moriyama/College Folk Album No 2 (Japanese: カレッジフォークアルバムNo.2) - Ryoko Moriyama
- 6 December and 20 December: Abbey Road - The Beatles

== Annual charts ==
Saori Yuki's Yoake no Scat was number 1 in the Oricon annual singles chart. Mitsuo Sagawa's Imawa Shiawase Kai (Japanese: 今は幸せかい) was number 1 in the Japanese kayokyoku annual singles chart published in Billboard.

== Film and television ==
The music of Double Suicide, by Tōru Takemitsu, won the 24th Mainichi Film Award for Best Music. The first broadcast of NTV Kōhaku Uta No Best Ten was on 6 October 1969. The Tigers: Hi! London was released on 12 July 1969.

== Other singles released ==
- Kaze by Hashida Norihiko and Schuberts
- Koi No Dorei by Chiyo Okumura
- 15 January: Shiroi Buranko by Billy BanBan
- 25 January: Last Chance (Japanese: ラスト・チャンス) by Yuya Uchida and his The Flowers
- 1 February: Hontodayo by Kenji Endō
- 1 March: Minna Yume no Naka by Kyōko Takada
- 10 April: Boku No Omochabako (My Toy Box) by Kazuhiko Katō
- 25 July: Wakare No Samba (Japanese: 別れのサンバ) by Kiyoshi Hasegawa
- 1 October: Shiroi Iro Wa Koibito No Iro (Colors of Love) by Betsy & Chris

== Other albums released ==
- Challenge! by Flower Travellin' Band

== See also ==
- Timeline of Japanese music
- 1969 in Japan
- 1969 in music
- w:ja:1969年の音楽
