= List of Oricon number-one singles of 1970 =

The highest-selling singles in Japan are ranked in the Oricon Singles Chart, which is published by Oricon Style magazine. The data are compiled by Oricon based on each singles' physical sales. This list includes the singles that reached the number one place on that chart in 1970.

== Oricon Weekly Singles Chart ==
Issue date	Song	Artist(s)	Ref.
January 5	"Kuroneko no Tango"	Osamu Minagawa	
January 12	"Kuroneko no Tango"	Osamu Minagawa	
January 19	"Kuroneko no Tango"	Osamu Minagawa	
January 26	"Kuroneko no Tango"	Osamu Minagawa	
February 2	"Kuroneko no Tango"	Osamu Minagawa	
February 9	"Kuroneko no Tango"	Osamu Minagawa	
February 16	"Awazu ni Aishite"	Hiroshi Uchiyamada and Cool Five	
February 23	"Awazu ni Aishite"	Hiroshi Uchiyamada and Cool Five	
March 2	"Awazu ni Aishite"	Hiroshi Uchiyamada and Cool Five	
March 9	"Shiroi Chō no Samba"	Kayoko Moriyama	
March 16	"Shiroi Chō no Samba"	Kayoko Moriyama	
March 23	"Shiroi Chō no Samba"	Kayoko Moriyama	
March 30	"Onna no Blues"	Keiko Fuji	
April 6	"Onna no Blues"	Keiko Fuji	
April 13	"Onna no Blues"	Keiko Fuji	
April 20	"Onna no Blues"	Keiko Fuji	
April 27	"Onna no Blues"	Keiko Fuji	
May 4	"Onna no Blues"	Keiko Fuji	
May 11	"Onna no Blues"	Keiko Fuji	
May 18	"Onna no Blues"	Keiko Fuji	
May 25	"Keiko no Yume wa Yoru Hiraku"	Keiko Fuji	
June 1	"Keiko no Yume wa Yoru Hiraku"	Keiko Fuji	
June 8	"Keiko no Yume wa Yoru Hiraku"	Keiko Fuji	
June 15	"Keiko no Yume wa Yoru Hiraku"	Keiko Fuji	
June 22	"Keiko no Yume wa Yoru Hiraku"	Keiko Fuji	
June 29	"Keiko no Yume wa Yoru Hiraku"	Keiko Fuji	
July 6	"Keiko no Yume wa Yoru Hiraku"	Keiko Fuji	
July 13	"Keiko no Yume wa Yoru Hiraku"	Keiko Fuji	
July 20	"Keiko no Yume wa Yoru Hiraku"	Keiko Fuji	
July 27	"Keiko no Yume wa Yoru Hiraku"	Keiko Fuji	
August 3	"Ai wa Kizutsuki Yasuku"	Hide & Rosanna	
August 10	"Ai wa Kizutsuki Yasuku"	Hide & Rosanna	
August 17	"Ai wa Kizutsuki Yasuku"	Hide & Rosanna	
August 24	"Ai wa Kizutsuki Yasuku"	Hide & Rosanna	
August 31	"Ai wa Kizutsuki Yasuku"	Hide & Rosanna	
September 7	"Tegami"	Saori Yuki	
September 14	"Tegami"	Saori Yuki	
September 21	"Tegami"	Saori Yuki	
September 28	"Tegami"	Saori Yuki	
October 5	"Tegami"	Saori Yuki	
October 12	"Tegami"	Saori Yuki	
October 19	"The Lovers of the World"; Japanese title: "Otoko no Sekai" (男の世界; lit. "The World of the Man")	Jerry Wallace	
October 26	"The Lovers of the World"; Japanese title: "Otoko no Sekai" (男の世界; lit. "The World of the Man")	Jerry Wallace	
November 2	"The Lovers of the World"; Japanese title: "Otoko no Sekai" (男の世界; lit. "The World of the Man")	Jerry Wallace	
November 9	"Kyōto no Koi"	Yūko Nagisa	
November 16	"Kyōto no Koi"	Yūko Nagisa	
November 23	"Kyōto no Koi"	Yūko Nagisa	
November 30	"Kyōto no Koi"	Yūko Nagisa	
December 7	"Kyōto no Koi"	Yūko Nagisa	
December 14	"Kyōto no Koi"	Yūko Nagisa	
December 21	"Kyōto no Koi"	Yūko Nagisa	
December 28	"Kyōto no Koi"	Yūko Nagisa	

== See also ==
- 1970 in Japanese music
