= 15th Japan Record Awards =

1973 Japanese music awards ceremony

- Date: 31 December 1973
- Venue: Imperial Garden Theater, Tokyo
- Hosted by: Keizo Takahashi, Mitsuko Mori, Hiroshi Tamaoki

Television/radio coverage
- Network: TBS

The 15th Annual Japan Record Awards took place at the Imperial Garden Theater in Chiyoda, Tokyo, on 31 December 1973, starting at 7:00PM JST. The primary ceremonies were televised in Japan on TBS.

The audience rating was 44.1%.

== Award winners ==
=== Japan Record Award ===
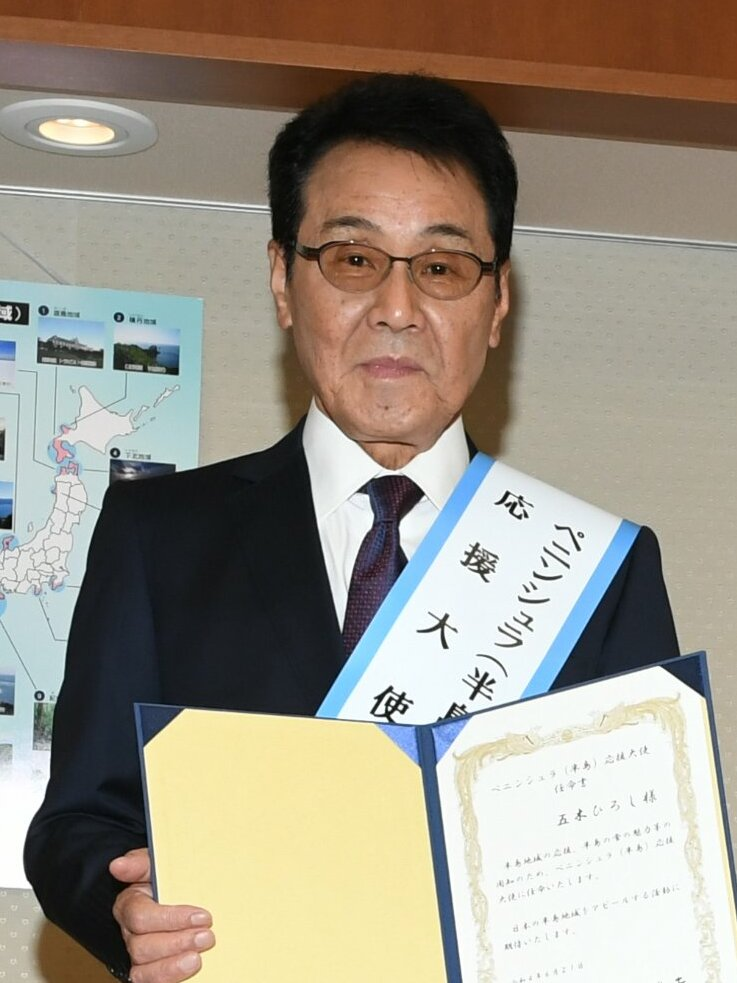
Hiroshi Itsuki, Japan Record Award winner. 3rd time awarded in JRA.

Hiroshi Itsuki for "Yozora"

- Lyricist: Yoko Yamaguchi
- Composer: Masaaki Hirao
- Arranger: Kouji Ryuuzaki
- Record Company: Minoruphone/Tokuma Japan

=== Best Vocalist ===
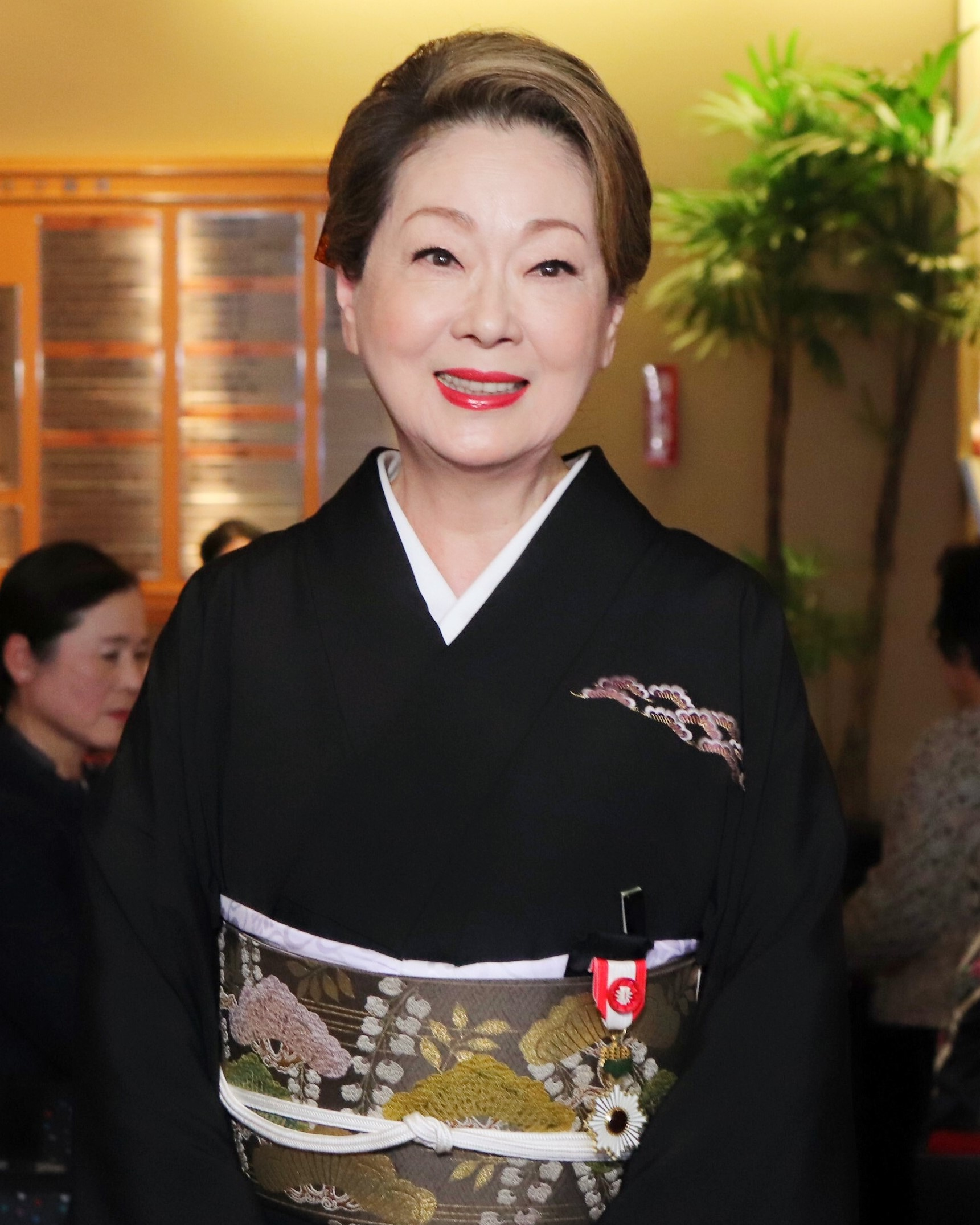
Saori Yuki, awarded Best Vocalist Award. Awarded again after awarded vocalist award 3 years ago.

Saori Yuki for "Koibumi"

=== Best New Artist ===
Junko Sakurada for "Watashi No Aoi Tori"

=== Vocalist Award ===
- Hideki Saijo for "Chigireta Ai"
- Aki Yashiro for "Namida Koi"
- Cherish for "Shiroi Guitar"

=== New Artist Award ===
- Miyoko Asada for "Akai Fussen"
- Maria Anzai for "Namida No Taiyō"
- Shizue Abe for "Coffee Shop De"
- Agnes Chan for "Sougen No Kagayaki"

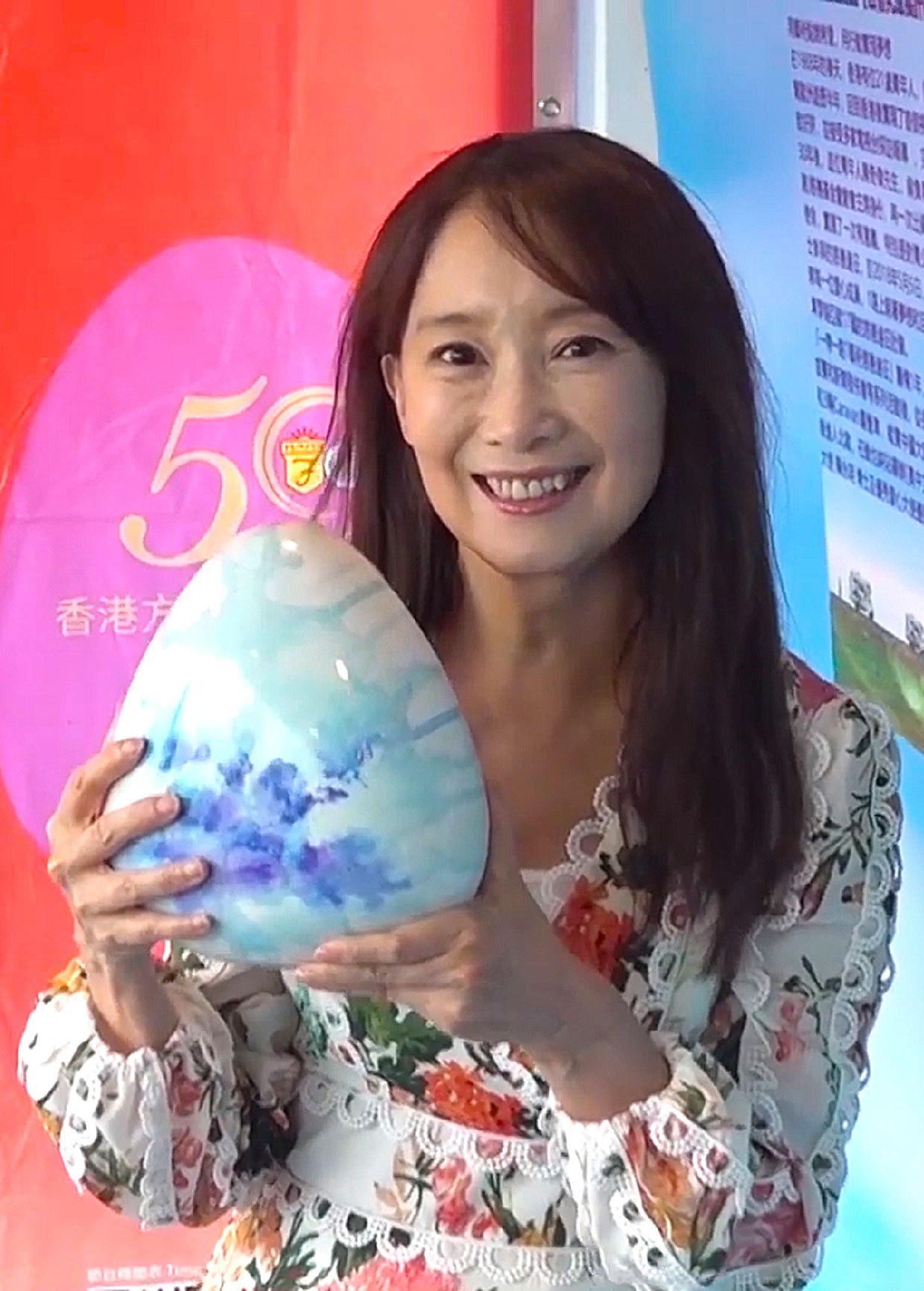
Agnes Chan, awarded New Artist Award.

=== General Public Award ===
- Megumi Asaoka for "Watashi No Kare Wa Hidarikiki"
  - Last year's best new artist.
- Garo for "Romance"
- Kenji Sawada for "Kikenna Futari"

=== Lyricist Award ===
- Yū Aku for "Johnny He No Dengon", "Jinjin Sasete" and "Machi No Akari"
  - Singer: Pedro & Capricious, Linda Yamamoto and Masaaki Sakai

=== Composer Award ===
- Keisuke Hama for "Soshite, Koube" and "Machi No Akari"
  - Singer: Hiroshi Uchiyamada and Cool Five and Masaaki Sakai

=== Arranger Award ===
- Kouji Ryuuzaki for "Wakaba No Sasayaki"
  - Singer: Mari Amachi

=== Planning Award ===
- CBS Sony for "Tanin no Kankei"
  - Singer: Katsuko Kanai
- King Records for "Hachiro Kasuga Enka 100 Sen"
  - Singer: Hachiro Kasuga
  - Awarded after 2 years, 4th planning award.

=== Children's Song Award ===
Keita Dai for "Mama To Boku No Shiki"

=== Special Award ===
- Tetsuo Maruyama & Nippon Columbia
- King Records
- Nippon Columbia
  - Awarded after 3 years.
- Masato Fujida
- Hamako Watanabe
  - Song: Ieraishiang

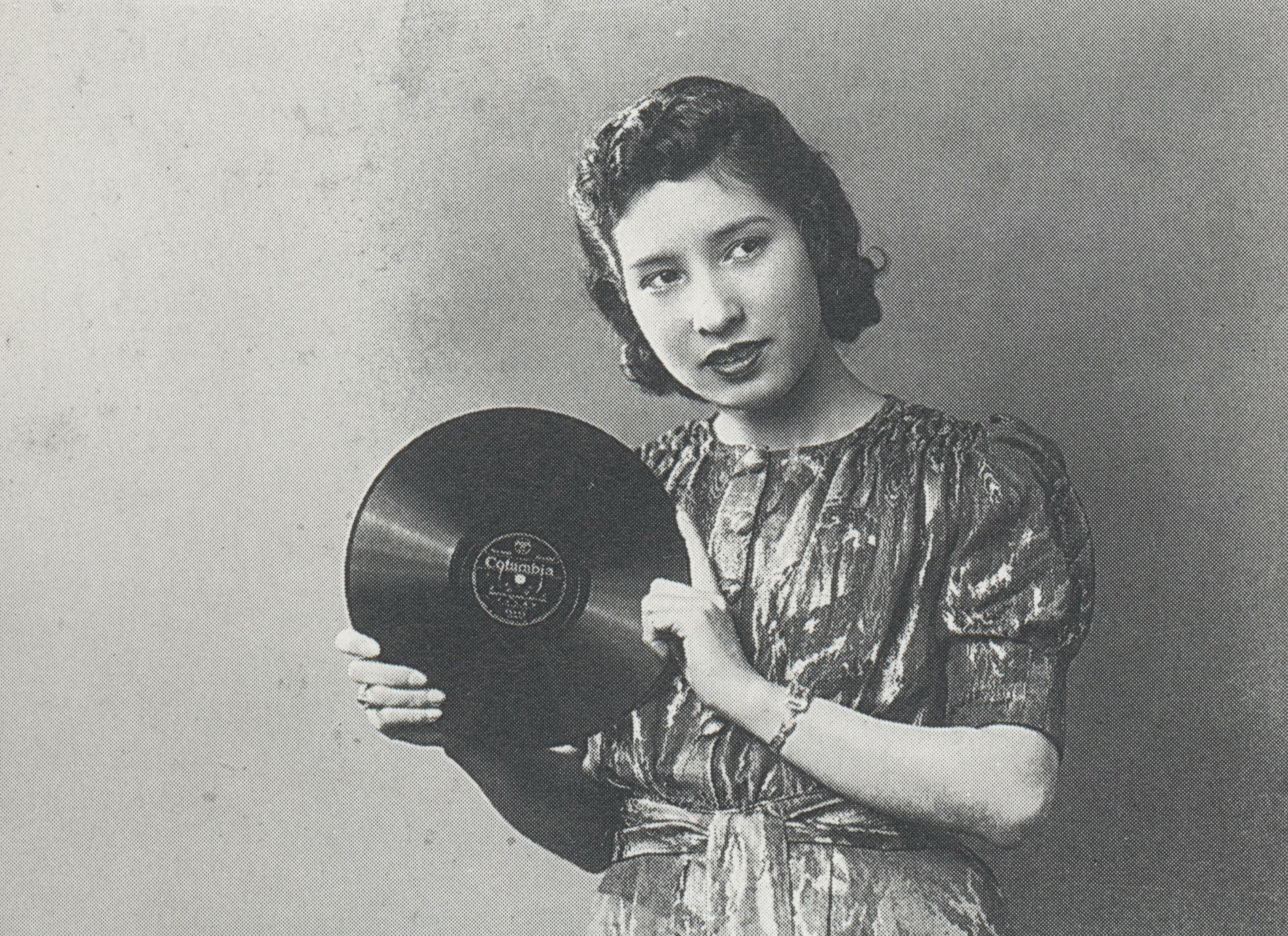
Hamako Watanabe, awarded Special Award.

=== 15th Anniversary Commemorative Award ===
- Naomi Sagara
  - 1967 New Artist Award & 1969 Japan Record Award
    - Theme: Sekkai Wa Futari No Tameni
- Shinichi Mori
  - 1969 & 1971 Best Vocalist, 1970 Vocalist Award
    - Theme: Minatomachi Blues
- Harumi Miyako
  - 1964 New Artist Award
    - Theme: Anko Tsubaki Wa Koi No Hana
- Saburo Kitajima
  - 1962 New Artist Award
    - Theme: Hakodate No Hito
- Yukio Hashi
  - 1960 New Artist Award, 1962 & 1966 Japan Record Award
    - Theme: Itakogasa
- Frank Nagai
  - 1959 & 1963 Vocalist Award, 1961 Japan Record Award
    - Theme: Kimi Koishi
- Hibari Misora
  - 1960 Vocalist Award & 1965 Japan Record Award
    - Theme: Yawara
- Hiroshi Mizuhara
  - 1959 Japan Record Award & 1967 Vocalist Award
    - Theme: Kuroi Hana Bira
- The Peanuts
  - Theme: Koi No Vacation
- Kiyoko Suizenji
  - 1969 General Public Award
    - Theme: 365 Ho No March
- Teruhiko Saigō
  - 1964 New Artist Award
    - Theme: Jyu Nana O No Kono Mune Ni
- Mina Aoe
  - 1968 & 1969 Vocalist Award
    - Theme: Isezakicho Blues

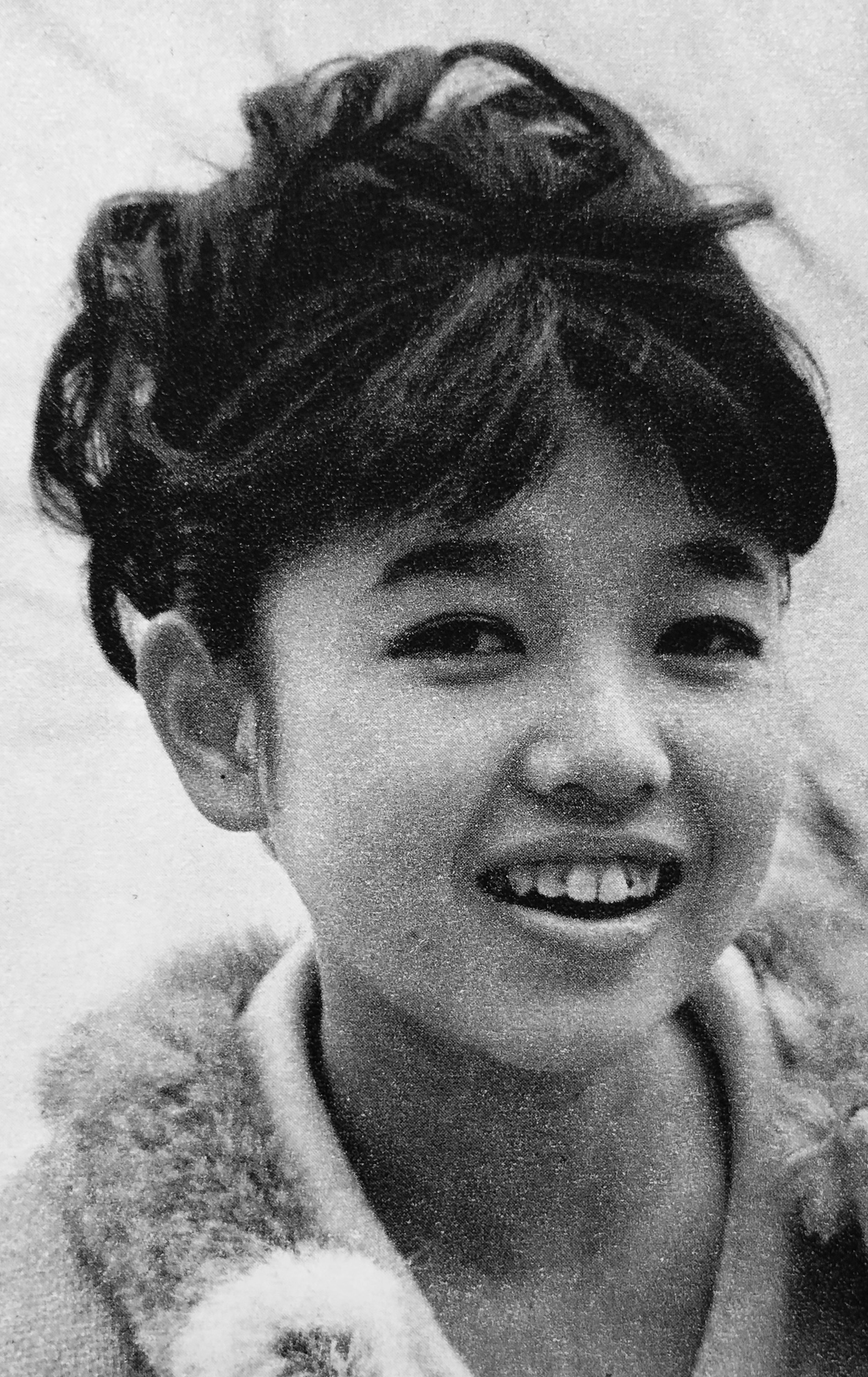
Miyako Harumi.

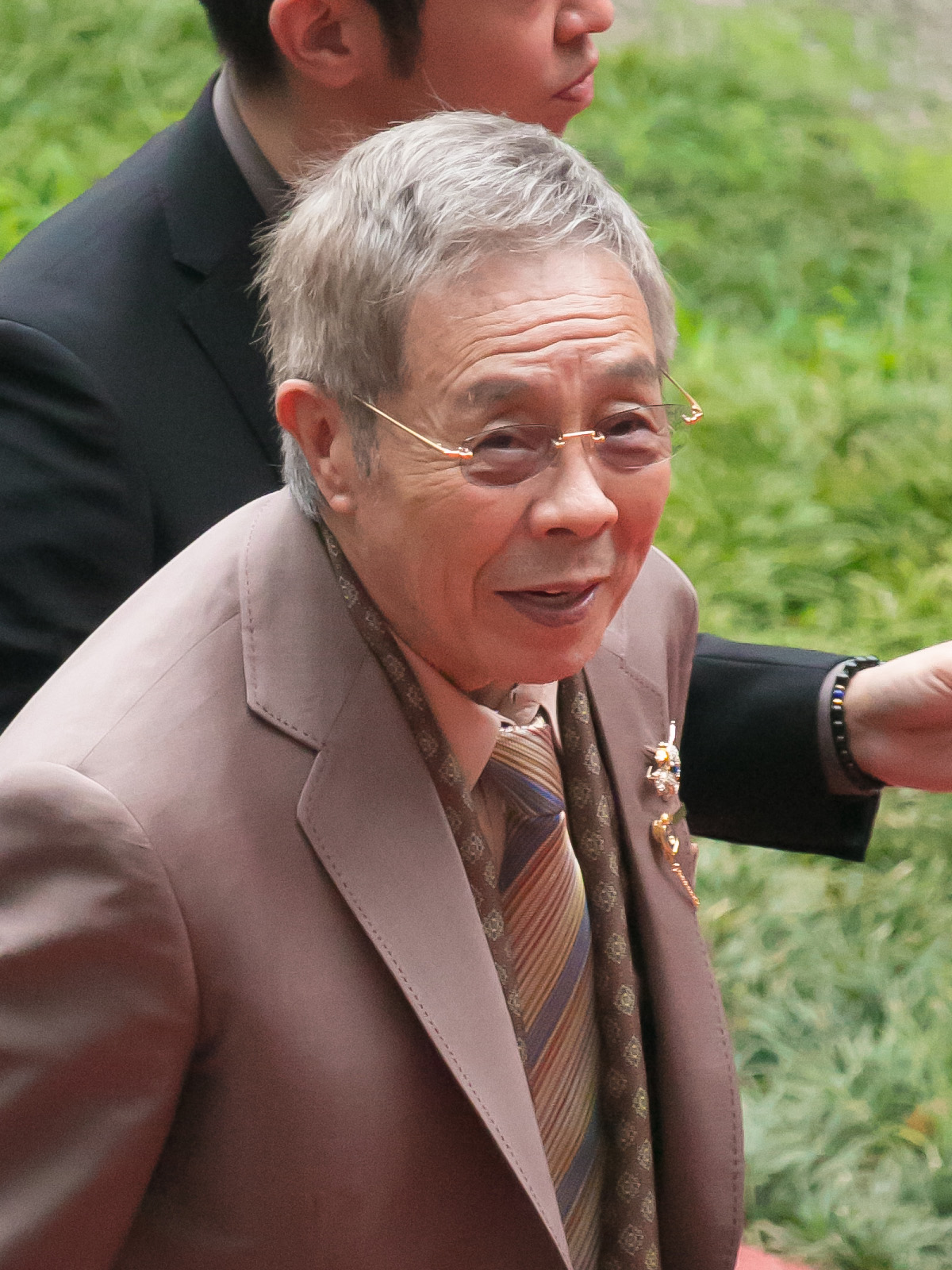
Saburō Kitajima.

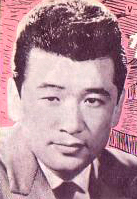
Frank Nagai.

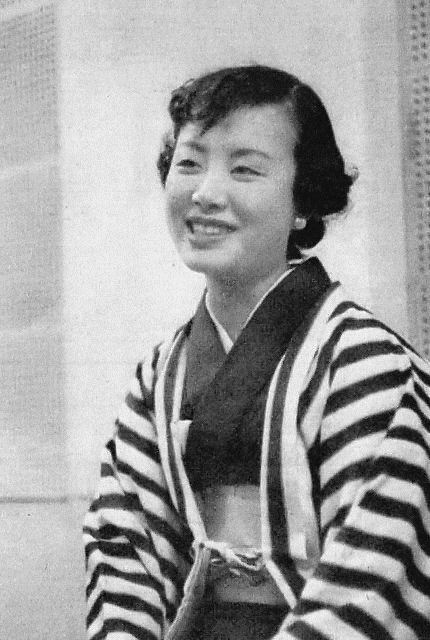
Hibari Misora.

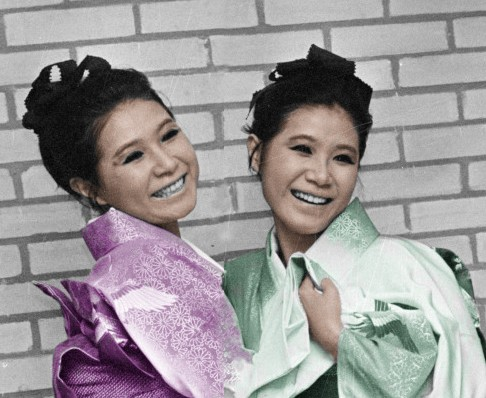
The Peanuts.

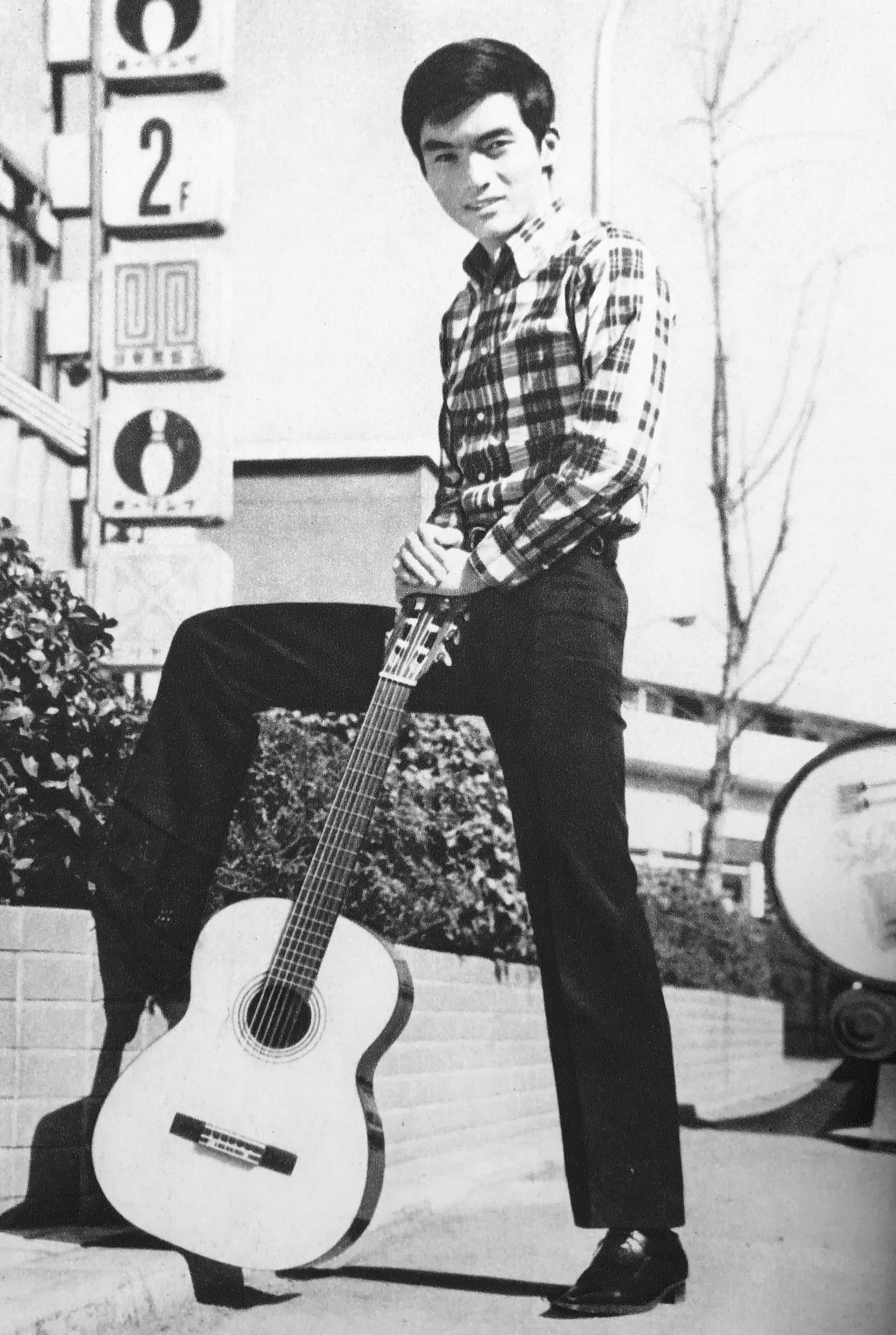
Saigo Teruhiko.

== See also ==
- 1973 in Japanese music
- 24th NHK Kōhaku Uta Gassen
