= 12th Japan Record Awards =

1970 Japanese music awards ceremony

- Date: 31 December 1970
- Venue: Imperial Garden Theater, Tokyo
- Hosted by: Keizo Takahashi

Television/radio coverage
- Network: TBS

The 12th Japan Record Awards took place at the Imperial Garden Theater in Chiyoda, Tokyo, on 31 December 1970, starting at 7:00PM JST. The primary ceremonies were televised in Japan on TBS.

== Award winners ==
=== Japan Record Award ===
- Yoichi Sugawara for "Kyou De Owakare"
  - Lyricist: Rei Nakanishi-2nd time awarded after 2 years
  - Composer: Akira Ui
  - Arranger: Kenichirou Morioka-2nd time awarded after 3 years
  - Record Company: Polydor Records

=== Best Vocalist ===
- Vacant

=== Best New Artist ===
- Akira Nishikino for "Mou Koi Nanoka"

=== Vocalist Award ===
- Youko Kishi for "Kibou"
  - 2nd time awarded after 6 years, absent the live because of collagen disease, only responding by phone call. The vocal performer that has the most potential to be the best vocal performance winner.
- Hiroshi Uchiyamada and Cool Five for "Uwasa No Onna"
- Saori Yuki for "Tegami"
- Shinichi Mori for "Hatoba Onna No Blues"
  - Last year's best vocal performance winner.

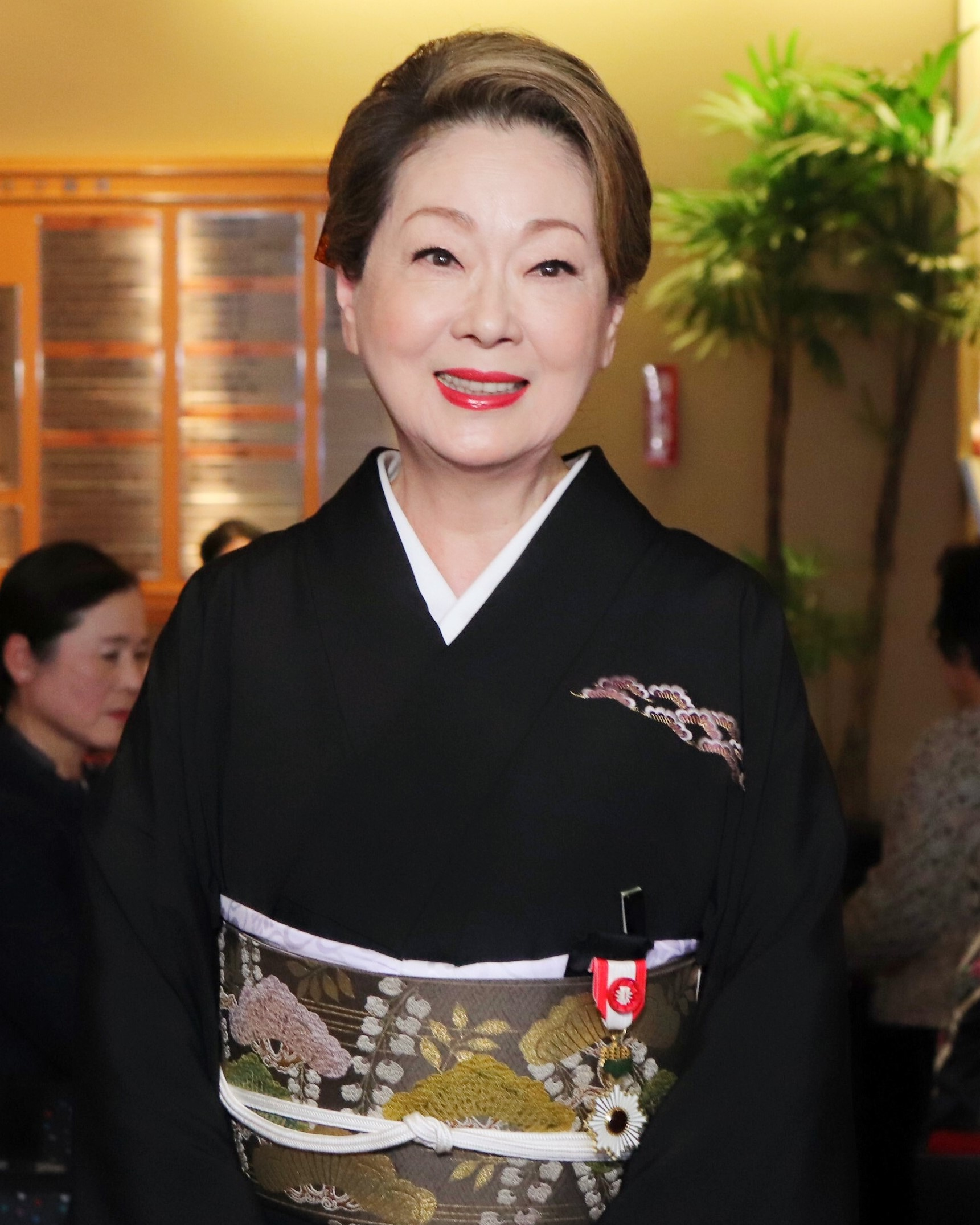
Saori Yuki, awarded Vocalist Award. 'The Letter' is her another big hit after last year's Yoake No Scat (Scat In The Dawn/Scat In The Dark).

=== General Public Award ===
- Keiko Fuji for "Inochi Azukemas"
- The Drifters for "Drift No Zundokobushi"

=== New Artist Award ===
- Masaki Nomura for "Ichido Dakenara"
- Ritsuko Abe for "Ai No Kizuna"
- Salty Sugar for "Hashire Koutaro"
- Mari Henmi for "Keiken"

=== Composer Award ===
- Makoto Kawaguchi for "Manatsu No Arashi"
  - Singer:Teruhiko Saigō

=== Arrangement Award ===
- Shunichi Makaino for "Waratte Yurushite"
  - Singer:Akiko Wada

=== Lyricist Award ===
- Rei Nakanishi for "Showa Onna Blues"
  - Singer:Mina Aoe
  - Awarded again after 3 years, 4th composer award.

=== Special Award ===
- Staff of Nippon Columbia for "Nihon Hayariuta No Ayumi"

=== Planning Award ===
- Nippon Columbia for "Futari No Ginza" and "Kyoto No Koi"
  - Composer:The Ventures
  - Singer: Masako Izumi, Ken Yamauchi and Yuuko Nagisa
  - 4th time in a row for 2 years.

=== Children's Song Award ===
- Sakiko Tamagawa for "Moomin Theme"
  - Theme song for Moomin.

== See also ==
- 1970 in Japanese music
