= All Time Best: Utahime Cover =

Compilation album by Akina Nakamori
- Released: August 6, 2014
- Recorded: 1994–2014
- Genres: J-pop; kayōkyoku; enka; jazz
- Length: 66:54 (Disc 1); 59:13 (Disc 2)
- Language: Japanese
- Label: Universal Music Japan

Akina Nakamori chronology
All Time Best: Original (2014)	All Time Best: Utahime Cover (2014)	All Time Best: Original & Cover (2014)

Singles from All Time Best: Utahime Cover
- 1. "Koi no Dorei" Released: July 16, 2014; 2. "Otoko to Onna no Ohanashi" Released: July 16, 2014

All Time Best: Utahime Cover (オールタイム・ベスト -歌姫(カヴァー)-, Ōru Taimu Besuto -Utahime (Kavā)-) is a compilation album by Japanese entertainer Akina Nakamori, released through Universal Music Japan on August 6, 2014. The album compiles the singles and select tracks from Nakamori's Utahime cover album series. It was later combined with All Time Best: Original in the four-disc compilation All Time Best: Original & Cover on December 3, 2014.

The album was released in regular and first-press editions. The limited edition includes the DVD release of the NHK special Songs: Akina Nakamori – Utahime Special (SONGS～中森明菜・歌姫スペシャル～).

== Chart performance ==
The album debuted at No. 7 on Oricon's weekly albums chart and charted for 30 weeks.

== Track listing ==
Disc 1
No.	Title	Lyrics	Music	Original artist	Length
1.	"Dance wa Umaku Odorenai" (Dansu wa Umaku Odorenai (ダンスはうまく踊れない; "I Can't Dance Well"))	Yōsui Inoue	Inoue	Seri Ishikawa	5:41
2.	"Aizenbashi" ((愛染橋; "Aizen Bridge"))	Takashi Matsumoto	Takao Horiuchi	Momoe Yamaguchi	4:44
3.	"Momoiro Toiki" ((桃色吐息; "Pink Sigh"))	Chinfa Kan	Takashi Satō	Mariko Takahashi	3:42
4.	"Single Again" (Shinguru Agein (シングル・アゲイン))	Mariya Takeuchi	Takeuchi	Mariya Takeuchi	4:04
5.	"Cosmos" (Kosumosu (秋桜))	Masashi Sada	Sada	Momoe Yamaguchi	3:54
6.	"Ihōjin" ((異邦人; "The Stranger"))	Saki Kubota	Kubota	Saki Kubota	3:28
7.	"Ruriiro no Chikyū" ((瑠璃色の地球; "Lapis Lazuli Colored Earth"))	Matsumoto	Natsumi Hirai	Seiko Matsuda	4:22
8.	"Kasa ga Nai" ((傘がない; "No Umbrella"))	Inoue	Inoue	Yōsui Inoue	6:21
9.	"Mado" ((窓; "Window"))	Chiharu Matsuyama	Matsuyama	Chiharu Matsuyama	4:55
10.	"Ai wa Kagerō" ((愛はかげろう; "Let's Hide the Love"))	Kazuto Miura	Miura	Gamu	4:24
11.	"Koi no Yokan" ((恋の予感; "Feelings of Love"))	Inoue	Kōji Tamaki	Anzen Chitai	4:38
12.	"Ichigo Hakusho wo Mōichido" ((『いちご白書』をもう一度; "Strawberry White Paper Again"))	Yumi Arai	Arai	Ban Ban	4:14
13.	"22-sai no Wakare" ((22才の別れ; "A 22-year-old's Farewell"))	Shōzō Ise	Ise	Kaze	3:27
14.	"Koi" ((恋; "Love"))	Matsuyama	Matsuyama	Chiharu Matsuyama	4:22
15.	"Īhi Tabidachi" ((いい日旅立ち; "A Good Day Departure"))	Shinji Tanimura	Tanimura	Momoe Yamaguchi	4:31
Total length:					66:54

Disc 2
No.	Title	Lyrics	Music	Original artist	Length
1.	"Amagi-goe" ((天城越え; "Walk Over Amagi Pass"))	Osamu Yoshioka	Tetsuya Gen	Sayuri Ishikawa	4:45
2.	"Mugonzaka" ((無言坂; "Silent Slope"))	Mutsuki Ichikawa	Tamaki	Kaori Kozai	4:30
3.	"Hisame" ((氷雨; "Icy Rain"))	Ren Tomari	Tomari	Mika Hino	3:50
4.	"Ettō Tsubame" ((越冬つばめ; "Swallow Over Winter"))	Shinichi Ishihara	Yoshihiko Shinohara	Masako Mori	4:02
5.	"Yozakura Oshichi" ((夜桜お七; "Cherry Blossoms at Night"))	Amari Hayashi	Takashi Miki	Fuyumi Sakamoto	5:37
6.	"Koi no Kisetsu" ((恋の季節; "Season of Love"))	Tokiko Iwatani	Taku Izumi	Pinky & Killers	3:02
7.	"Isesakichō Blues" (Isesakichō Burūsu (伊勢佐木町ブルース))	Kōhan Kawauchi	Yōichi Suzuki	Mina Aoe	3:30
8.	"Tanin no Kankei" ((他人の関係; "Relationships with Others"))	Mieko Arima	Makoto Kawaguchi	Katsuko Kanai	3:59
9.	"Nagori Yuki" ((なごり雪; "Relic Snow"))	Ise	Ise	Kaguyahime	3:38
10.	"Akujo" ((悪女; "Bad Woman"))	Miyuki Nakajima	Nakajima	Miyuki Nakajima	4:05
11.	"I Love You"	Yutaka Ozaki	Ozaki	Yutaka Ozaki	4:18
12.	"Velvet Easter (Live Version)" (Berubetto Īsutā (ベルベット・イースター))	Arai	Arai	Yumi Matsutoya	4:08
13.	"Woman: W no Higeki Yori (Live Version)" ((Woman “Wの悲劇より”; "Woman 'From the Tragedy of W'"))	Matsumoto	Karuho Kureta	Hiroko Yakushimaru	3:56
14.	"Koi no Dorei (Bonus Track)" ((恋の奴隷; "Slave of Love"))	Rei Nakanishi	Kunihiko Suzuki	Chiyo Okumura	2:22
15.	"Otoko to Onna no Ohanashi (Bonus Track)" ((男と女のお話; "A Story of a Man and a Woman"))	Kyōsuke Kuni	Masakazu Mizushima	Mimi Hiyoshi	3:24
Total length:					59:13

Limited Edition DVD
No.	Title	Lyrics	Music	Length
1.	"Akujo"	Nakajima	Nakajima
2.	"Dance wa Umaku Odorenai"	Inoue	Inoue
3.	"I Love You"	Ozaki	Ozaki
4.	"Velvet Easter"	Arai	Arai
5.	"Ihōjin"	Kubota	Kubota
6.	"Nagori Yuki"	Ise	Ise
7.	"Koi no Yokan"	Inoue	Tamaki
8.	"Koi"	Matsuyama	Matsuyama

== Charts ==
Chart (2014)	Peak position
Japanese Albums (Oricon)	7
