= 11th Japan Record Awards =

1969 Japanese music awards ceremony

- Date: 31 December 1969
- Venue: Imperial Garden Theater, Tokyo
- Hosted by: Keizo Takahashi
- Website: http://www.jacompa.or.jp

Television/radio coverage
- Network: TBS

The 11th Annual Japan Record Awards took place at the Imperial Garden Theater in Chiyoda, Tokyo, on 31 December 1969, starting at 7:00PM JST. The primary ceremonies were televised in Japan on TBS.

== Award winners ==
Japan Record Award

- Naomi Sagara for "Iijanai No Shiawase Naraba"
  - Awarded New Artist at 2 years ago, 2nd award.
  - Lyricist: Tokiko Iwatani
  - Composer: Taku Izumi
  - Arranger: Taku Izumi
  - Record Company: JVCKenwood Victor Entertainment

Best Vocalist

- Shinichi Mori for "Minatomachi Blues"
  - Lost to Naomi Sagara by one vote.

Best New Artist

- Peter for "Yoru To Asa No Aida Ni"

New Artist Award

- Norihiko Hashida and the Shoebelts for "Kaze"
- Hiroshi Uchiyamada and Cool Five for "Nagasaki Wa Kyō Mo Ame Datta"
- Kaoru Chiga for "Mayonaka No Guitar"
- Kyōko Takada for "Minna Yume no Naka"

Vocalist Award

- Mina Aoe for "Ikebukuro no Yoru"
  - Awarded again after last year, 2nd vocalist award.
- Mieko Hirota for "Ningyō no Ie"
- Tokiko Kato for "Hitorine No Komori Uta"

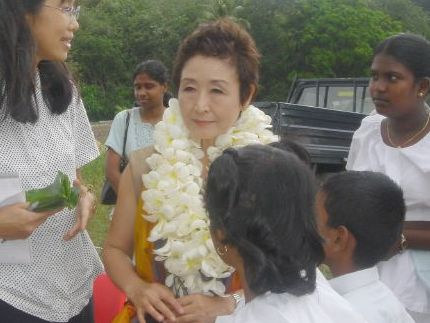
Tokiko Kato, Awarded again in JRA after awarded New Artist Award three years ago.

General Public Award

- Kiyoko Suizenji for "365 Step's March" & "Jinjitsu Ichiro No March"
- Ryoko Moriyama for "Kinjireta Koi"

Lyricist Award

- Michio Yamagami for "Yoake no Scat"
  - Singer: Saori Yuki

Composer Award

- Kyōhei Tsutsumi for "Blue Light Yokohama"
  - Singer: Ayumi Ishida

Arranger Award

- Shinzō Teraoka for "Kanashimi Wa Kake Ashi De Yatte Kuru"
  - Singer: Mariko Ann
  - Awarded again after 5 years, 2nd arranger award.

Planning Award

- EMI Music Japan
  - Awarded again after 3 years, 3rd planning award.

Children's Song Award

- Three Bubbles for "Umareta Kyō Dai 11-nin"

Special Award

- Takao Saeki
- EMI Music Japan

== Other Performers ==
=== Guests ===
- Jun Mayuzumi (Last year's Japan Record Award winner, give trophy to Naomi Sagara.)
- Yoichi Sugawara (Last year's vocalist award winner, give trophy to Mori Shinichi.)
- Pinky & Killers (Last year's new artist award winner, give trophy to Peter and banquet to Naomi Sagara.)
- Yukio Hashi
- Hibari Misora

=== Dancers ===
- Studio No.1 Dancers
- BM Dancers

=== Chorus ===
- Cole Acacia
- Wakakusa Children's Chorus

== See also ==
- 1969 in Japanese music
