= Kiyoshi Maekawa =

Japanese singer and tarento (born 1948)

- Born: Kiyoshi Maekawa (前川 清, Maekawa Kiyoshi); August 19, 1948 (age 77)
- Origin: Sasebo, Nagasaki, Japan
- Genres: Kayōkyoku, enka, contemporary folk, rock, pop
- Occupations: Singer, tarento
- Years active: 1967–present
- Labels: Victor Entertainment; BMG Japan; Pony Canyon; Gauss Entertainment/Tokuma Japan Communications; Teichiku
- Website: www.maekiyo.com

Kiyoshi Maekawa (前川 清, Maekawa Kiyoshi; born August 19, 1948) is a Japanese singer and tarento.

He is best known as the first lead vocalist of Hiroshi Uchiyamada and Cool Five, which was formed in 1967 and debuted in 1969 with the Japan Record Award-winning song "Nagasaki wa Kyō mo Ame Datta". As a frontman of the band, he spawned multiple hit singles such as "Awazu ni Aishite", "Uwasa no Onna","Soshite, Kōbe", "Nakanoshima Blues" and "Tokyo Sabaku" during the 1970s. In 1982, he released his first solo single "Yuki Ressha" composed and produced by Grammy-winning musician Ryuichi Sakamoto, and left the group five years later. During his solo career, he released only one top-20 hit "Himawari" in 2002, a ballad contributed by Masaharu Fukuyama.

Aside from the recording career, Maekawa has also built up popularity as a TV star, appearing on some television shows hosted by comedians such as Kinichi Hagimoto and The Drifters, airing around the latter half of 1970s and the 1980s.

== Personal life ==
He is also known as a former spouse of the singer, Keiko Fuji, who later married Teruzane Utada and had a daughter Hikaru.

== Notable singles ==
- "Hana no Toki, Ai no Toki (花の時 愛の時)"(1987)
- "Ai ga Hoshii (愛がほしい)" (1988)
- "Namida (涙)" (1988)
- "Koiuta (恋唄)" (1989, remake of Cool Five hit) – No. 87
- "Otoko to Onna no Kakera (男と女の破片)" (1991) – No. 61
- "Yume Ichibyou (夢一秒)" (1992) – No. 71
- "Wakareuta Demo Utatte (別れ曲でも唄って)" (1992) – No. 78
- "Koisuru Omise (恋するお店)" (1994) – No. 95
- "Kanashimi no Koisekai (悲しみの恋世界)" (1994) – No. 69
- "Shuchakueki Nagasaki (終着駅 長崎)" (1996) – No. 96
- "Dakishimete (抱きしめて)" (1996) – No. 70
- "Bara no Orgel (薔薇のオルゴール, Bara no Orugōru)" (1997) – No. 97
- "Kōbe (神戸)" (1998) – No. 93
- "Hayariuta (流行歌)" (2000) – No. 93
- "Osaka (大阪)" (2001) – No. 92
- "Rinrin to (霖霖)" (2001) – No. 88
- "Himawari (ひまわり)" (2002) – No. 13
- "Yakan Hikou (夜間飛行)" (2003) – No. 74
- "Furusato no Hana no You ni (故郷の花のように)" (2003) – No. 69
- "Mado (窓)" (2006) – No. 62

Notes

1. Chart positions provided by the Oricon, and sources are from the archives on its official site (not available before 1988).

== Kōhaku Uta Gassen Appearances ==
Year	#	Song	No.	VS	Remarks
1969 (Showa 44)/20th	-	Nagasaki Wa Kyoumo Amedatta	19/23	Pinky & Killers	Participate under the name of Hiroshi Uchiyamada and Cool Five
1970 (Showa 45)/21st	-	Uwasa No Onna (噂の女)	13/24	Ryoko Moriyama	Participate under the name of Hiroshi Uchiyamada and Cool Five
1971 (Showa 46)/22nd	-	Minato No Wakareuta (港の別れ唄)	-/25	Fuji Keiko (original schedule)	Participate under the name of Hiroshi Uchiyamada and Cool Five
1974 (Showa 49)/25th	-	Uminari (海鳴り)	18/25	Mari Amachi	Participate under the name of Hiroshi Uchiyamada and Cool Five
1975 (Showa 50)/26th	-	Naka No Shima Blues (中の島ブルース)	12/24	Mina Aoe	Participate under the name of Hiroshi Uchiyamada and Cool Five
1976 (Showa 51)/27th	-	Tokyo Sabaku	6/24	Naomi Sagara	Participate under the name of Hiroshi Uchiyamada and Cool Five
1977 (Showa 52)/28th	-	Omoikiri Hashi (思い切り橋)	17/24	Mina Aoe (2)	Participate under the name of Hiroshi Uchiyamada and Cool Five
1978 (Showa 53)/29th	-	Hashigo Sake (さようならの彼方へ)	15/24	Hiromi Ōta	Participate under the name of Hiroshi Uchiyamada and Cool Five
1979 (Showa 54)/30th	-	Hashigo Sake (昔があるから)	19/23	Sayuri Ishikawa	Participate under the name of Hiroshi Uchiyamada and Cool Five
1980 (Showa 55)/31st	-	Hashigo Sake (魅惑・シェイプアップ)	10/23	Rumiko Koyanagi	Participate under the name of Hiroshi Uchiyamada and Cool Five
1981 (Showa 56)/32nd	-	Hashigo Sake (女・こぬか雨)	19/22	Sachiko Kobayashi	Participate under the name of Hiroshi Uchiyamada and Cool Five
1982 (Showa 57)/33rd	-	Uwasa No Onna (2)	16/22	Miyuki Kawanaka	Participate under the name of Hiroshi Uchiyamada and Cool Five
2006 (Heisei 18)/57th	1	Nagasaki Wa Kyou Mo Amedatta (长崎は今日も雨だった)	12/27	Masako Mori	
2007 (Heisei 19)/58th	2	Soshite Koube (そして、神戸)	8/27	Kaori Mizumori	
2008 (Heisei 20)/59th	3	Tokyo Sabaku (東京砂漠)	8/27	Miyuki Kawanaka	

== Filmography ==
=== Film ===
- Lupin III: Strange Psychokinetic Strategy (1974)
- Have a Song on Your Lips (2015)
- The Bucket List (2019)

=== Television ===
- Tokyo Megure Keishi (1978) (1 episode; episode 1)
- Shinzanmono (2010)
- Mito Kōmon (2010)
- Maiagare! (2022)
