= Shizue Abe =

Japanese actress and singer

Shizue Abe (あべ静江, Abe Shizue, born November 28, 1951, in Matsusaka, Mie, Japan) is a Japanese actress and singer.

== Biography ==
Shizue Abe debuted as an idol with the song "Coffee Shop De" (At The Coffee Shop) in May 1973. It was written by famous Japanese lyricist Yū Aku. The song sold over 280,000 copies and rose to the #9 position on the Oricon chart list. It earned her a nomination for "Best Newcomer of the Year" at the 15th Japan Record Awards, but was beaten by Junko Sakurada.

Her second single, "Mizuiro no Tegami" (The Lightblue Letters), rose to the #7 position on the Oricon chart list, selling over 260,000 copies. She made an appearance on Kōhaku Uta Gassen in 1974 with this song.

Shizue Abe released 18 singles between 1973 and 2010. Apart from being a singer she also acts in movies and TV drama's.

== See also ==
- Kayōkyoku
- Japanese idol
- List of Japanese idols
