= Minna Yume no Naka =

Song and single by Kyōko Takada

"Minna Yume no Naka (みんな夢の中)"

Single by Kyōko Takada
- Language: Japanese
- English title: Everyone's in a Dream
- A-side: "Minna Yume no Naka"
- B-side: "Mimi no Ushiro de"
- Released: March 1, 1969
- Genre: Kayokyoku
- Length: 3:11
- Label: King Records
- Songwriter: Kuranosuke Hamaguchi

Kyōko Takada singles chronology
"Minna Yume no Naka (みんな夢の中)" (1969)	"Gondola Maka se (ゴンドラまかせ)" (1969)

"Minna Yume no Naka" (みんな夢の中; Everyone's in a Dream) is a Japanese song and single by Kyōko Takada released in 1969.

== Background and release ==
Takada had been part of a band, The Mikes, when they disbanded in 1967. Takada was then convinced to join a singing competition by a friend where she won, and was signed by King Records.

After being signed, composer Kuranosuke Hamaguchi gave her the lyrics to the song, and she said she was deeply moved. Takada had to record the song many times, with Hamaguchi encouraging her to sing it differently from each previous take. As the recording session went on, Takada struggled, confused as to what he wanted, but Hamaguchi decided to use her last recording of the song as the final version.

The song was released on March 1, 1969. Later, in 1977, Takada re-recorded the song and it was featured on her 1978 album Kyōko Takada: All Her Charms.

== Reception ==
The song was received well, with it peaking at no.17 on the Oricon Charts, and remaining on the charts well into the summer of that year.

The song sold half a million copies by July 1969, and its long lasting success that year led Takada to be invited to perform on the Kōhaku Uta Gassen.

== Awards ==
1969:

New Artist Award (Note: She won this award for this song.) - 11th Japan Record Awards

== In popular media ==
"Minna Yume no Naka" had a short film dedicated to it in the short film collection "Tokyo Rhapsody". It has also been used in 1992s "Everyone's in a Dream ~ A Tale of a Fake Hamakura" (Note: みんな夢の中～ある偽ハマクラ伝), "Takeda Tetsuya no Shōwa wa kagayaiteita", 2015s The Actor, and more.

== Covers ==
The song has been covered by many singers, including Sizzle Ohtaka, Kaori Kozai, Saori Yuki, Harumi Miyako, and more.
