= Takeda Tetsuya no Shōwa wa kagayaiteita =

Japanese television series

- Presented by: Tetsuya Takeda; Miki Handa; Sayaka Suguro (former presenter); Noriko Fukuda (former presenter)
- Country of origin: Japan
- Original language: Japanese

Production
- Production company: BS TV Tokyo (Note: Previously credited as BS Japan until 2018.)

Original release
- Network: BS TV Tokyo
- Release: 2 April 2013 – present

Takeda Tetsuya no Shōwa wa kagayaiteita (Japanese: 武田鉄矢の昭和は輝いていた) (English: Tetsuya Takeda's Showa was Shining) is a Japanese television series broadcast since 2013. It is broadcast on BS TV Tokyo (called BS Japan [Japanese: BSジャパン] until 2018), which is a subsidiary of TV Tokyo Holdings.

The series is about the Showa era, and is presented by Tetsuya Takeda. The other presenter was originally Sayaka Suguro, who was replaced by Noriko Fukuda, who was replaced by Miki Handa. It is a talk show. It is a manifestation of Showa nostalgia.

The 300th episode was broadcast on 23 October 2020. The 10th year episode was broadcast on 1 April 2022. The 10th anniversary concert was held on 6 September 2023 at the Shinjuku Bunka Center, and broadcast on 6 October 2023.

On 19 February 2017, the episode on Tōru Funamura, from 2015, was rebroadcast following his death on 16 February. On 16 October 2020, the episode on Kyōhei Tsutsumi, from 2015, was rebroadcast following his death on 7 October.

Guests have included, amongst others, Tokiko Kato (2019), Judy Ongg (2019) Sachiko Kobayashi (2020), and Sayuri Kume (2024).

== Episodes ==
- 7 June 2019: Special episode about Hideki Saijo
- 12 July 2019: Special episode about Kyu Sakamoto
- 17 January 2020: Special episode about, in particular, Keiko Fuji and Mina Aoe
- 29 March 2024: Episode about Aki Yashiro
