= Kyōko Takada =

Japanese singer

Kyōko Takada 高田恭子
- Born: October 24, 1948 (age 78); Kyoto, Kyoto Prefecture, Japan
- Genre: Kayōkyoku
- Years active: 1967–1980, 1997–present
- Label: King Records

Kyōko Takada (高田恭子) is a Japanese singer and actress who is best known for her March 1969 song "Minna Yume no Naka", which sold over half a million copies by July 1969.

== Early life ==
Kyōko Takada was born on October 24, 1948, in Kyoto, Japan.

Around 1965 or 66, Takada performed the song Takeda Lullaby in a choir with Doshisha University. Folk singer Takahiko Otsuka then arranged the song and soon after Takada did a studio recording, the first known person to do a studio recording of this song. Takahiko was initially drawn to Takada after hearing her singing songs by western singers such as Connie Francis. After recording the song, it was featured on the album The First and Last and then later on the album The History of Kansai Folk Music. Takada herself later featured the song on her 1970 album "Kyōko Takada: Double Deluxe".

After graduating from high school, she joined the amateur folk singing scene. She then joined a band called the Mikes, where she became the band's vocalist.

Her voice was noted for its uniqueness, and after the band disbanded, she was convinced by a friend to join a singing competition which she won. This led her to begin singing.

== Music career ==
In 1969 she was handed the lyrics to "Minna Yume no Naka" and she later said she was moved deeply by them.

"Minna Yume no Naka" was a huge hit selling over a half a million copies by July 1969. Its steady success throughout that year got Takada on the 20th rendition of the Kōhaku Uta Gassen. She also won many awards for the song such as the new artist award during the 11th Japan Record Awards.

The following year in 1970 she released "Kyou no Ame" another hit that was very popular on radio. She would later re record the song in 1979 which would be her last single.

In 1973, she released "Sayonara no Mukou ni" which she performed and won an award for during the Tokyo Music Festival.

She continued releasing music, many of which became popular, however she retired in 1980 (something that the media claimed was due to her getting married).

However she resumed her career in 1997 after appearing on television.

Between the 2000s and 2010s she performed at many festivals and Shōwa era music shows and, as of 2026, she performs at many Shōwa era events.

In 2012, her song "Kawa wo Nogiku ga" was featured on a compilation album, which bought it new-found success.

On March 1, 2024, to celebrate her 55th anniversary as a singer, King Records made her music available on streaming platforms.

In 2026, Takada performed at the Japan Singer Association summer festival, where she performed "Minna Yume no Naka" on July 28, and a cover of "Dio, come ti amo" on the 30th that same month.

== Personal life ==
Takada graduated from Doshisha Girls High School. She likes Canzone. It is thought by the media that Takada married in 1980 to a businessman.

== In pop-culture ==
Takada, specifically her music, has been used in many pieces of entertainment throughout the years.

"Minna Yume no Naka" had a short film dedicated to it in the short film collection "Tokyo Rhapsody". It has also been used in 1992s "Everyone's in a Dream ~ A Tale of a Fake Hamakura" (Note: みんな夢の中～ある偽ハマクラ伝), "Takeda Tetsuya no Shōwa wa kagayaiteita", 2015s The Actor, and more.

"Gondola Maka Se" was used in the 1969 film Umi wa Furimukanai directed by Kōichi Saitō. Takada herself is a credited actress in this film, playing the role of Mariko's friend. Takada sings her song (Gondola Maka Se) during the film.

"Ai wa Maboro Shika" was used in the TBS drama "Keiji-kun".

"Shuu" was used as the theme song for the Fuji Television show "Onnamichi".

== Discography ==
=== With the Mikes ===
- "Hoshizora no Massachusetts/Yume no Bokujō" (1967, single) (Note: The Mikes previously released one single before "Hoshizora no Massachusetts/Yume no Bokujō" which was "Nobara no Shōkei/Ramblin' Man". However the vocalist was Akane Tanabe, who left after the first single.)

=== Albums ===
1970

- Kyōko Takada Deluxe / Yoru mo Bara no Yōni
- Kyōko Takada: Double Deluxe

1971

- Kyōko Takada Deluxe ~Kyōko Takada on Stage~ (Live) (Note: with Richard Pine & Company)

1978

- Kyōko Takada: All Her Charms

=== Singles ===
1969

- "Minna Yume no Naka/Mimi no Ushiro de"
- "Gondola Maka Se/Koi no Akari"
- "Yoru mo Bara no Yōni/Kininaru Hito"

1970

- "Kawa wo Nogiku ga/Watashi no Ai wa"
- "Onna wa Wakaru/Atarimae no Kotodakedo"
- "Kyou no Ame/Yoru wa Blues"

1971

- "Ame no Yoru Kyoto ni Kaeru/Shii hanabira"
- "Ai wa Maboro Shika/Koi no Mokuba"

1972

- "Rabu (Love)/Anata no kurai jōnetsu"
- "Yoru no Hikishio/Kuchi dzukekara mōichido"
- "Koi Banashi/Watashi ni nani ga dekirudeshou"

1973

- "Sayonara no Mukou ni/Koi no 13 Gatsu" (Note: 恋の十三月 also romanised as "Koi no jūsan Gatsu")

1974

- "Ajisaiiro no Hibi/Soyokaze ni notte"

1975

- "Sutemashita/Futatabime no koi"

1976

- "Onna no Ki Machi/Tori no Kosarete"

1977

- "Shiroi Kenshin/Anata no Sekai"
- "Shuu/Sara no Hana"
- "Hirato no Uta/Kimimachigusa wa Saitemo"

1979

- "Kyou no Ame/Yoake no Lullaby" (Note: A-side is a rerecording of a 1970 song she made under the same name. Some lyrics were changed to make the song more about "a woman's lingering regrets" but the new lyrics were still written by Mieko Arima who wrote the original 1970 version.)
