= Tanin no Kankei =

1973 song by Katsuko Kanai

Song
- Genre: J-pop
- Composer: Makoto Kawaguchi
- Lyricist: Mieko Arima

"Tanin no Kankei" (Japanese: 他人の関係) is a song written by Mieko Arima and composed-arranged by Makoto Kawaguchi. The original version, known by the English name "Like Strangers", was released in 1973 and sung by Katsuko Kanai, becoming her most successful hit. In 2014, Yo Hitoto and Soil & "Pimp" Sessions released a cover of the song as the theme song for the 2014 Fuji TV drama Hirugao.

== Original version ==
"Tanin no Kankei"

Single by Katsuko Kanai
- Language: Japanese
- English title: "Like Strangers"
- B-side: "Invitation of Honey"
- Released: 21 March 1973
- Length: 6:49
- Label: CBS/Sony
- Composer: Masato Kawaguchi
- Lyricist: Mieko Arima
- Producer: Masatoshi Sakai

=== Background ===
CBS/Sony producer Masatoshi Sakai requested composer Makoto Kawaguchi to "somehow write a hit song for" Kanai after she joined the label in September 1969. Although Kanai had performed at Kōhaku Uta Gassen prior to this song, she felt that she had not achieved a hit song within the past decade. Therefore, she planned to retire from singing when she was given "Tanin no Kankei".

According to Yū Aoki of Real Sound, "Tanin no Kankei" is about "the secretive love between an adult man and woman". Motohiro Makaino of Nippon Hōsō News Online said that writing a pop song from the perspective of an affair between two lovers which "begins indifferent and gradually grows passionate ... was a novel approach". When Kanai was given the sheet music for the song, she saw the erotic lyrics and felt that they "were awful", and she did not realize it would be a hit at the time.

Due to producer concerns about the potentially graphic nature of the lyrics, the choreography was limited so that she would "sing with an artificial feel, without any emotion at all". The choreography drew inspiration from "The Rich Man's Frug" in the Neil Simon musical Sweet Charity. In the process, the introductory chant, (Note: Sources differ on whether it's "banbanbabanban" (バンバンババンバン), "pappappapapa" (パッパッパパパ), or "pappappayappā" (パッパッパヤッパー). However, Kawaguchi once confirmed that it is "banban bababan" (バンバン、ババンバン).) where she would stretch out her arms to both sides, was conceived. In contrast to her existing image "of being a dynamic dancer", Kawaguchi devised her "impersonal", robotic singing style for the song. Aoki said that the lyrics of the song "describe the secretive love between an adult man and woman".

"Tanin no Kankei", which was Katsuko Kanai's 31st single, was released on 21 March 1973. As with the B-side "Invitation of Honey", Mieko Arima was the lyricist and Makoto Kawaguchi was composer-arranger. It was Kanai's most successful song at the time, becoming the first single to chart within the top ten of the Oricon Singles Chart (where it peaked at #7 during the week of 23 July 1973) and selling 670,000 copies.

The Flashers, a dance team from Kanai's Nishino Ballet Company alma mater, often performed the song alongside her. The song was performed at the 24th Kōhaku Uta Gassen.

=== Reception and legacy ===
After the song's release, the song's opening chant became well-known, including among children, and Kanai became known as the "pioneer of finger-action", with finger action becoming widespread in music. Due to its similarities to the gestures made by flight attendants when pointing to emergency exits, the finger-action chant was often made by plane passengers.

In 1973, the song won the Planning Award at the 15th Japan Record Awards. The song was later used for a 1990s commercial for Zen-Noh Pearl Life, with Kanai herself performing it.

Kuniaki Ebinuma of KKBox said that the song is part of Kanai's shift towards "a more sexy style" alongside "Queen Bee" and "Eros no Asa", saying "If you listen carefully to the lyrics, you'll notice they're all about love affairs. But what allows this song to remain "purple" is the absence of bitterness. It exudes a purple sexiness without being dark. That's what makes pop songs from the '70s so interesting." Futaba Kojima of What's In described it as "the epitome of sensual pop music", noting that it "instantly evokes the vulgar glow of neon lights and velvet counter chairs reeking of cigarettes". Sponichi Annex called the melody "decadent" and said that "once you're hooked, Kanai's somewhat mechanical, whisper-like singing voice lingers in your memory."

=== Track listing ===
Credits and track length are cited from the original release.

No.	Title	Lyrics	Music	Arrangement	Length
1.	"Like Strangers" (他人の関係)	Mieko Arima	Makoto Kawaguchi	Kawaguchi	3:48
2.	"Invitation of Honey" (蜜の誘惑)	Arima	Kawaguchi	Kawaguchi	3:01
Total length:					6:49

== Yo Hitoto version ==
"Tanin no Kankei feat. Soil & "Pimp" Sessions"

Single by Yo Hitoto

from the album Shijūsō
- Language: Japanese
- B-side: "Gokai feat. Transbalance"
- Released: 27 August 2014
- Label: Universal Music Japan
- Composer: Masato Kawaguchi
- Lyricist: Mieko Arima
- Producer: Soil & "Pimp" Sessions

A cover of "Tanin no Kankei" by Yo Hitoto was performed as the theme song for the 2014 Fuji TV drama Hirugao and it was released on 27 August 2014 from Universal Music Japan. She had covered the song for her 2012 cover album of Showa-era pop songs, Kayōkyoku, but remade the song for the drama's production, selecting Soil & "Pimp" Sessions as her collaboration partner. It was also the third track of Hitoto's 2014 album Shijūsō.

The music video was directed by Shoichi David Haruyama and also features Soil & "Pimp" Sessions. Aoki called it "a powerful visual depiction of desire...everything is aggressive," and Kojima said of the music video: "the seductive and stimulating footage, which focuses on the subject of appetite as Hitoto eats through 30 different dishes, is definitely worth a look." The release cover was illustrated by Tōru Shioka.

A limited edition was released with a DVD with the title track's music video, as well as a cover with minor differences.

Kojima called the cover song "the contrast between purity and lewdness", saying that "the combination of her pure vocals and those passionate words creates a strangely intimate, modern sensuality, successfully portraying the extreme duality of a woman". Aoki said of Hitoto's vocals in the song: "Her breath is like the very essence of the passion that can't be contained, even as she tries to suppress her burning desire. Her singing, with its subtle expressions, including occasional vocals and scat that aren't in the lyrics, strongly conveys intense emotion and a mature flavor."

Hitoto performed the song with Kanai at the 2014 FNS Uta no Natsu Matsuri.

=== Track listing ===
Credits and track length are cited from Tower Records.

CD
No.	Title	Lyrics	Music	Arrangement	Length
1.	"Tanin no Kankei feat. Soil & "Pimp" Sessions" (他人の関係 feat.SOIL&"PIMP"SESSIONS)	Arima	Kawaguchi	Soil & "Pimp" Sessions	3:27
2.	"Gokai feat. Transbalance" (GOKAI feat.トランスパランス)	Yo Hitoto	Swing-O	Transbalance	3:37
3.	"Tanin no Kankei feat. Soil & "Pimp" Sessions (Instrumental)" (他人の関係 feat.SOIL&"PIMP"SESSIONS (Instrumental))	Arima	Kawaguchi	Soil & "Pimp" Sessions	3:24

DVD
No.	Title	Length
1.	"Tanin no Kankei feat. Soil & "Pimp" Sessions (Music Video)" (他人の関係 feat.SOIL&"PIMP"SESSIONS (Music Video))	3:48
Total length:		13:49
