= Folk guerrilla concerts =

1969 anti-Vietnam War rallies in Shinjuku, Tokyo, Japan

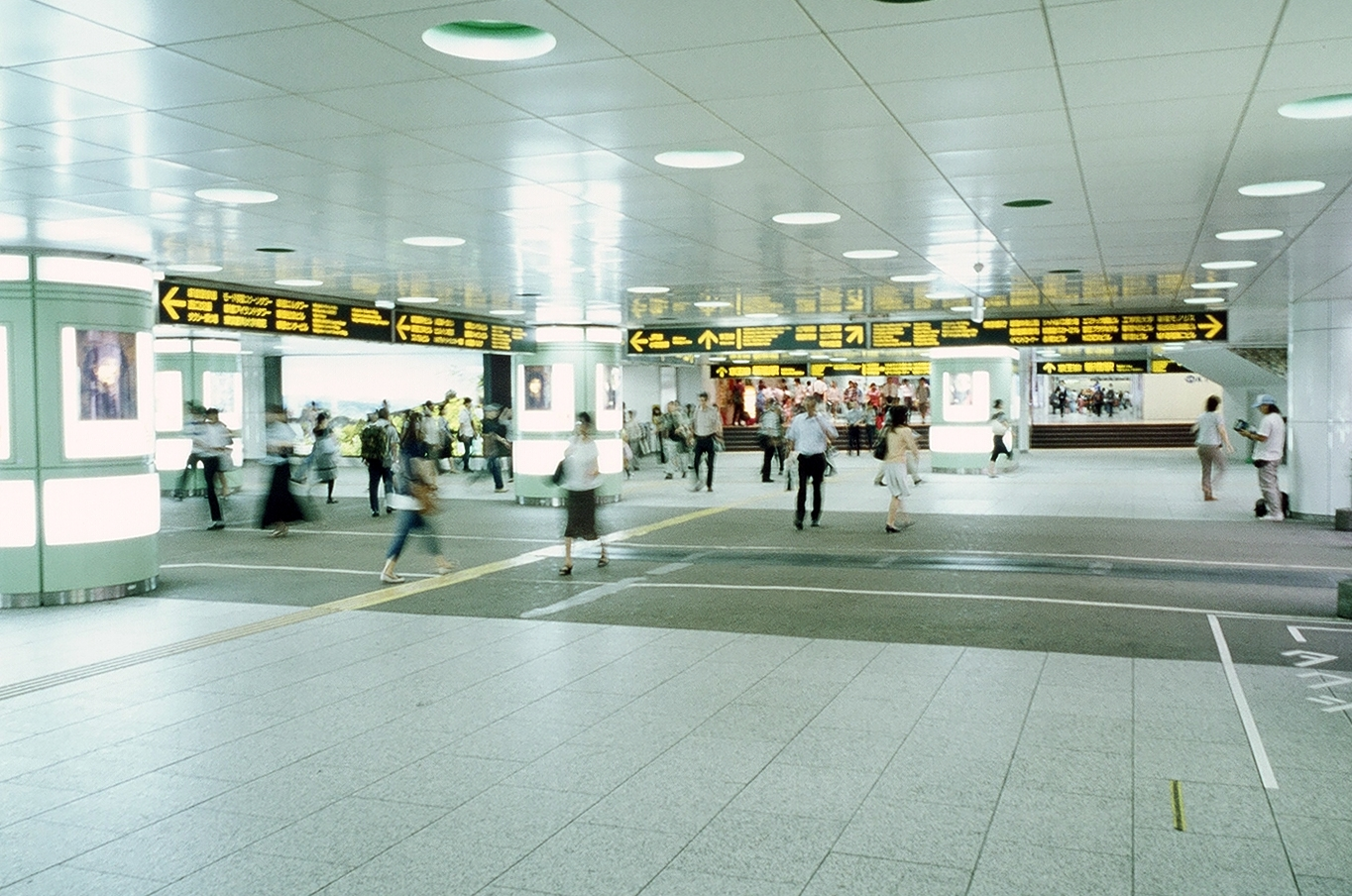
West underground gate of Shinjuku station, where the concerts started

The folk guerrilla concerts were folk music concerts in Shinjuku station, Shinjuku, Tokyo, held by anti-Vietnam War activists in 1969. The people who participated in the concert were termed folk guerrillas (Japanese: フォークゲリラ). The concerts were organized by the anti-war group Beheiren. They began in February, and concerts continued up until July, when a fight with riot police led to the dispersal of the concerts and the arrests of musicians.

== Background ==
The anti-war movement opposing the Vietnam War was heralded by Beheiren, a New Left organization in Japan. In 1967, the singer Joan Baez came to Japan with the support of Beheiren and performed the civil rights movement song We Shall Overcome. This helped inspire the launching of the folk guerrilla concerts in 1969. Folk music played an important role specifically within the 1968 protests in Japan, unlike in America, where folk music only played a large role in the civil rights movement. Eiji Oguma explains this through the slow movement of cultural trends from the USA to Japan. To the Japanese New Left, rock music was bourgeois and commercial compared to folk music. At the same time, guitars were expensive in Japan, leading to a fascination among the young towards guitars and folk music.

== Concerts ==
Anpo revolution, dissolve Anpo, freedom and liberation in Shinjuku, to victory!
— Unknown Author, Found written on a pillar in Shinjuku station during the folk guerrilla concerts

The rallies began in February 1969 with a concert near the underground west exit of Shinjuku Station. The concerts continued weekly, with musicians playing every Saturday. The concerts reached their height in mid-1969 — in May, a riot police intervention led to the de jure prohibition of the concerts. However, the concerts only moved to the east side of the station, and there was another clash in June. The violence did little to affect the numbers of attendees, though — by July, it had gone up by 2,000 from 5,000 in May to 7,000. July saw the occupation of the plaza at the east exit of Shinjuku station and a final fight involving 2,000 police officers. The police, trying to avoid a repeat of the Shinjuku riot, ended the concerts in Shinjuku, leading to the arrests of multiple musicians.

The ideology of the folk guerrilla concerts was that of anti-war and socialism. Speeches were held along with the music, and other protestors, such as those representing the rights of minorities, joined in the rallies. The concerts were characterized by the singing of radical or anti-war songs such as Tomo yo (My Friend), We Shall Overcome, and The Internationale, as well as jiguzagu (zig-zag) snake dancing, a radical form of dance within 1960s counterculture. The protests interfered with the public life of the people, with violence between activists and police spilling out of the station onto the streets of Shinjuku. There were also anti-folk guerrilla groups of people that fought with the activists. The folk guerrilla concerts also marked a change in protest strategy — the 1968-69 Japanese university protests, a movement which had been waning at the time, were concentrated mainly within campuses, while the Shinjuku concerts were held in the open plazas of Shinjuku station.

== Aftermath ==
The concerts are the main subject of the film Chikatetsu Hiroba (1970). The folk guerrilla concerts left an impact on Beheiren and the anti-war movement - in other rallies, there were smaller performances of folk music. The word hiroba, or "open space", represents a change created by the end of the folk guerrilla concerts - the dispersal of the big concerts in Shinjuku station to smaller ones across a wider area. The form of protest embodied by the folk guerrilla concerts left an impact on the modern world, with groups such as Aki no Arashi's anti-emperor performances in Harajuku following the death of Hirohito drawing inspiration from them.
