= Naomi Sagara =

Japanese pop singer

- 佐良 直美
- Born: Nahoko Yamaguchi (Japanese: 山口 納堡子); 10 January 1945; Tokyo, Japan
- Occupations: singer, animal welfare activist
- Years active: 1967-present

Naomi Sagara (佐良 直美, Sagara Naomi; born 1945) is the stage name of Nahoko Yamaguchi (山口 納堡子, Yamaguchi Nahoko), a Japanese popular singer who was prolific between 1967 and 1980. She won numerous awards as a singer and composer, branching into acting. After a surgery to remove polyps on her vocal cords in 1985, she became a business woman. Since 1993, she has worked in the field of animal welfare and has published several books about animal care. She has periodically returned to television in guest appearances and in 2010 resumed singing and composing.

== Early life ==
Sagara was born in 1945 in Tokyo. She suffered from severe shyness from childhood, but had a love for music. Raised in a wealthy family, her grandfather is the major shareholder of Tomoe Industries, she began music training with jazz singer Sanae Mizushima at the age of sixteen. She enrolled in Nihon University College of Arts to study television direction and originally wanted to produce music programming for Fuji TV. While she was in university, she continued singing at such venues as Nikko Music Salon mainly to gain an understanding of the performer's perspective. When she graduated in 1967, Fuji was not interested in hiring a woman producer, but she was approached by a scout from The Japan Victor Company who was looking for new singing talent.

== Career ==
Sagara debuted as a singer with the song The World for Two People (Japanese: 世界は二人のために), which won her the Best New Artists Prize at the 9th Japan Record Awards in 1967 and sold 1.2 million copies. She became known for her distinctive style and had many hits throughout the country. In 1969, she won the grand prize for Isn't It Fine, If I'm Happy (Japanese: いいじゃないの幸せならば) at the 11th Japan Record Awards, presented by the Japan Composer's Association for best new record and performer. The win marked the first time the top honors had gone to a woman. Beginning in 1967, Sagara was invited to sing at the Year-end Song Festival, known as "Kōhaku", hosted by the Japan Broadcasting Corporation (Japanese: Nippon Hōsō Kyōkai, NHK). For thirteen consecutive years, she participated and placed in the finals for the competition five times. In 1972, she won the annual singing battle and repeated her win in 1974 and 1976.

Her music career led Sagara into acting, as she composed the theme song for the television drama Arigatou (Thank you), which aired from 1970 to 1974. She was a featured actress in the final season of the program. In 1977, the mayor of Hiroshima, the Chamber of Commerce, and executives of the Hiroshima Bank organized a festival underwritten by the Chugoku Shimbun and RCC Broadcasting in honor of the resilience of the citizens in surviving the bombing and celebrating peace and the joy of living. Sagara was selected as the featured singer for the inaugural Hiroshima Flower Festival, and sang the theme song, Hanaguruma.

In 1980, a woman claiming to be Sagara's former partner outed her as a lesbian on TV Asahi's Afternoon Show, causing the collapse of her career. Sagara denied the alleged affair and the woman retracted her statement, but the damage was done, as invitations to the premier award shows disappeared. She did continue to work in music for a few years, releasing a single YASUKOの場合 (Yasuko case) in 1983 and then a jazz album to honor her former teacher Mizushima in 1986. After completing the album, Sagara lost interest in her music career. The following year, she had surgery to remove polyps on her vocal cords. She was told that after the surgery she would be unable to sing for a year. Sagara took a 9 to 5 job in her family business.

Wanting to work with animals, Sagara began a company, Animal Fanciers's Club, in 1993, in Nasushiobara in the Tochigi Prefecture. Her focus is on rescuing dogs and cats and improving animal welfare. At the facility, she trains dogs and does outreach, inviting internationally known lecturers to educate the public about proper care of animals. Since 2003, she has published books dealing with animal care. In 2010, after two decades away from the music industry, Sagara released an album, いのちの木陰 (Shades of Life). After hearing the song, she was selected in 2011 to compose and sing the theme song for the TBS series Izakaya Henji.

== Selected books ==
- Sagara, Naomi (2003). Sagara naomi ga oshieru inu tono kurashikata: chūkōnen ga aiken to tanoshiku kurasu tame no jōzu na shitsuke to kaikata (in Japanese). Tōkyō: Ōizumishoten. ISBN 978-4-278-03932-0.
- Sagara, Naomi; Okuda, Hiroko; Shimizu, Terunobu (2003). Wanchan to odekake (in Japanese). Tōkyō: Intāwākushuppan. ISBN 978-490-1-16150-3.
- Sagara, Naomi (2012). Dōbutsu no kamisama ni ikasarete (in Japanese). Tōkyō: Taikōsha. ISBN 978-4-924-89984-1.

== Awarded Songs ==
Year	Award	Song	Category
1967 (Showa 42)	9th Japan Record Awards	Sekkai Wa Futari No Tameni	New Artist Award
1969 (Showa 44)	11th Japan Record Awards	Iijanaino Shiawase Naraba	Japan Record Award
1973 (Showa 48)	15th Japan Record Awards	-	15th Anniversary Commemorative Award
