= Betsy & Chris =

Folk music duo

Elizabeth Virginia Wagner
- Born: September 4, 1952 (age 74); Hawaii, United States
- Other name: Betsy Curtis
- Occupation: Singer

Christine Anne Rolseth
- Born: June 25, 1952; Idaho, United States
- Died: February 16, 2021 (aged 68); Sedona, Arizona, United States
- Other name: Christine Anne Mullen
- Occupation: Singer

Betsy and Chris, also known as Betsui and Kurisu, were Elizabeth Wagner (born September 4, 1952) and Christine Rolseth (June 25, 1952 – February 16, 2021), were a folk music duo from Hawaii and Idaho respectively. They sang in the Japanese language, and had a string of hits in Japan from 1969 to 1972.

Wagner and Rolseth first visited Japan while they were students at Kailua High School, as members of the school's Madrigal Singers. They continued touring and recording in Japanese, as a duo called Betsy & Chris.

Betsy & Chris had a series of folk-pop hits in Japan, and appeared on Japanese television programs and in the Japanese film The Glorious Sunset (Yuuhi ga yonda otoko, 1970). Wagner continued with her musical career as Betsy Curtis, after Rolseth left performing to teach music.

Christine Rolseth Mullen died on February 16, 2021, from a kidney disease associated with diabetes.

== Singles ==
- White is the colour of lovers (jp: 白い色は恋人の色 ) 1 Oct 1969 #2 on the Orion Charts.
- Like a Flower (花のように) 10 Feb 1970 #9 on the Orion Charts.
- It's Summer, and you ... (夏よおまえは) 1 June 1970 #18 on the Orion Charts.
- My Daughter wore Flowers (娘は花をまとっていた) July 1970 #96 on the Orion Charts.
