= Katsuko Kanai =

Japanese singer (born 1945)

- 金井 克子
- Born: 17 June 1945 (age 80); Tianjin, China
- Occupations: Singer; dancer; actress
- Awards: Galaxy Award in Television/Individual (1966); Japan Record Awards Achievement Award (2019)
- Musical career
- Genres: J-pop
- Labels: Nippon Columbia; CBS/Sony

Katsuko Kanai (Japanese: 金井 克子, Hepburn: Kanai Katsuko; born 17 June 1945) is a Japanese singer, dancer, and actress. Born in occupied China, she worked in ballet during her youth and was a regular cast member on Uta no Grand Show and a member of Les Girls. She released dozens of singles as a singer, including the popular "Tanin no Kankei" (1973). Her accolades include a 1966 Galaxy Award and a 2019 Japan Record Awards Achievement Award.

== Biography ==
=== Early life ===
Katsuko Kanai was born on 17 June 1945 in Tianjin (then occupied by the pro-Japan Wang Jingwei regime), the youngest of five siblings. Her father worked at Toyobo and she was raised in corporate housing. The family was repatriated after World War II ended, and she was raised in Kishiwada, Osaka.

Influenced by her sisters (who were into ballet), Kanai joined the Nishino Ballet Company at age eight and planned to become a professional ballerina. After playing the lead for a 1959 ballet television special commemorating the marriage of Crown Prince Akihito, a producer hired her for the NHK variety show Yume de Aimashō, where she started as a dancer before being promoted to presenter.

=== Entertainment career and later life ===
Kanai became a regular cast member on NHK's Uta no Grand Show in 1964, and she won the 1966 Galaxy Award in Television/Individual for her work on the show. In 1966, she made her debut at the 17th Kōhaku Uta Gassen, performing "A Lover's Concerto". She was one of the founding members of the dancing unit Les Girls, and she sang the theme song for their titular Nippon Television series, "Mini Mini Girl". She became the first artist to make four consecutive appearances at Kōhaku Uta Gassen, with her second being a solo performance of "La Bamba" and the last two as part of Les Girls. She starred as Spade in the 1969 drama Flower Action 009-1.

In August 1962, Kanai made her record debut with "Hapsberg Serenade/Namida no Hakuchō", the former a cover of the Shepherd Sisters song. In 1966, she and Antonio Koga released the album Let's Sing With The Grand Show as part of Uta no Grand Show. By 1969, she had released 23 singles for Nippon Columbia, with her 1965 single "Noche de Tokyo" being a hit.

During her early singing career, Kanai constantly churned new releases regardless of her own wishes, and juggled time between school, work, and dancing, eventually devoting less time to the latter; since then, she has also spoken about her subsequent experiences with struggling with mental health and developing alopecia areata. After spending time at a ballet company in the New York area, she decided to make "Tanin no Kankei" her final song, but it rose to popularity. It was Kanai's most successful song at the time, peaking at #7 on 23 July 1973 Oricon Singles Chart. "Tanin no Kankei" sold 670,000 copies and was Kanai's first single to chart within the top ten. Motohiro Makaino of Nippon Hōsō News Online said that Kanai accelerated the evolution of Masatoshi Sakai's trend of "having veteran female singers who had made their mark in jazz and Latin music sing sexy pop songs".

Kanai won an Excellent Star Award at the 1973 All-Japan Cable Broadcasting Awards and an Excellence Award at the 1983 Japan Cable Awards. Her song "Ai Samazama" was the theme song of the 1982 TBS drama Akai Kankei. She also appeared in productions of musicals such as Annie, Anything Goes, and The Five O'Clock Girl.

Kanai appeared at the 2014 FNS Uta no Natsu Matsuri, singing "Tanin no Kankei" with Yo Hitoto (who also did a cover of the song). She starred as Midori Aihara in the 2016 Japanese remake of Miss Granny. She won an Achievement Award at the 61st Japan Record Awards in 2019.

=== Personal life ===
In 1981, Kanai married a dentist whom an in-law introduced her to; their wedding ceremony was in Pakistan, where the husband's cousin worked.

Kanai has undergone surgery for Raynaud syndrome and lumbar spinal stenosis. She began taking aerobics and hip-hop dance classes to maintain her strength. She is aquaphobic, which she recalled was because she almost drowned as a child in the company housing pool.

== Discography ==
=== Albums ===
Title	Year	Details	Peak chart positions	Sales	Ref.
Title	Year	Details	JPN	Sales	Ref.
Let's Sing With The Grand Show (歌のグランド・ショー) (with Antonio Koga)	1966	Released: March 1966; Label: Nippon Columbia	—	—	
Best Hits: Katsuko Kanai (金井克子ヒット全曲集)	1975	Released: 1975; Label: CBS/Sony	—	—	

=== Singles ===
Title	Year	Details	Peak chart positions	Sales	Ref.
Title	Year	Details	JPN	Sales	Ref.
"Hapsburg Serenade/Namida no Hakuchou" (ハップスバーグ・セレナーデ/涙の白鳥)	1962	Released: August 1962; Label: Nippon Columbia	—	—	
"Vacation/The Biggest Sin of All" (バケイション/涙のハート)	1962	Released: November 1962; Label: Nippon Columbia	—	—	
"It Happened Last Light/I Like Mike" (夜のデイト/遠い空の星)	1963	Released: 1963; Label: Nippon Columbia	—	—	
"Blame it on the Bossa Nova/Desafinado" (恋はボサノバ/いちごの片想い)	1963	Released: May 1963; Label: Nippon Columbia	—	—	
"La Mezza Luna/Vini Vini (Tamore Tahiti" (恋のお月さま/タムレ第1番)	1963	Released: 1963; Label: Nippon Columbia	—	—	
"Shizunde Shimaitai/Eucaly no Mizuumi" (沈んでしまいたい/ユーカリの湖)	1963	Released: January 1963; Label: Nippon Columbia	—	—	
"Mitsumenaide/Hoshi no Furu yona yoru Deshita" (見つめないで/星の降るよな夜でした)	1964	Released: 1964; Label: Nippon Columbia	—	—	
"Futari de Kurumachi/Aoi Mizuumi" (ふたりで来る街/青い湖)	1965	Released: February 1965; Label: Nippon Columbia	—	—	
"Showa Ondo/Do-Re-Mi-Fa Ondo" (昭和音頭/ドレミファ音頭)	1965	Released: April 1965; Label: Nippon Columbia	—	—	
"Noche De Tokyo/Ichinichi Dake no Princess" (ノーチェ デ・東京/一日だけのプリンセス)	1965	Released: May 1965; Label: Nippon Columbia	—	—	
"Quien Sera/Cha-Cha-Cha Flamenco" (キエン・セラ/チャ・チャ・チャ フラメンコ) (with Antonio Koga)	1965	Released: July 1965; Label: Nippon Columbia	—	—	
"Koi no GT Type/Itsumade mo Koi wo" (恋のGTタイプ/いつまでも恋を)	1965	Released: August 1965; Label: Nippon Columbia	—	—	
"Cumbia Lady/La Pollera Colora" (踊るクンビア娘/赤いスカートのクンビア)	1965	Released: September 1965; Label: Nippon Columbia	—	—	
"Adieu Tokyo/Sukini Nattemo Iino" (アデュー東京/好きになってもいゝの)	1966	Released: March 1966; Label: Nippon Columbia	—	—	
"Bonsoir Tokio/With My Highheel and You" (ボンソワール東京/忘れられたハイヒール)	1966	Released: August 1966; Label: Nippon Columbia	—	—	
"Aoi Dress/Yobeba Yokatta" (青いドレス/呼べばよかった)	1967	Released: 1967; Label: Nippon Columbia	—	—	
"Siempre Amor/Tokyo Flamenco" (シエンプレ・アモール/東京フラメンコ)	1967	Released: May 1967; Label: Nippon Columbia	—	—	
"Mini Mini Love/Mini Mini Girl" (小っちゃな恋の歌/ミニ・ミニ・ガール)	1967	Released: August 1967; Label: Nippon Columbia	—	—	
"Playmates Song/Eru wa Koibito" (いつもほがらかに/エルは恋人)	1967	Released: October 1967; Label: Nippon Columbia	—	—	
"Lovers/Let Me See" (恋人たちはいつも/ふたりの虹)	1968	Released: 1968; Label: Nippon Columbia	—	—	
"Summer Love/Quando M’Innamoro" (サマー・ラヴ/愛の花咲くとき)	1968	Released: June 1968; Label: Nippon Columbia	—	—	
"My True Heart/My Lovely Devil" (恋のうちあけ/憎いあなた)	1968	Released: August 1968; Label: Nippon Columbia	—	—	
"Koi no Shinwa/Shiroi Guitar" (恋の神話/白いギター)	1969	Released: February 1969; Label: Nippon Columbia	—	—	
"The Spinning Earth/Forget Not Beach" (それでも地球は回っている/海辺の出来事)	1969	Released: 1969; Label: CBS/Sony	—	—	
"I'm A Lonely Woman/Since Then" (誰もそれを知らない/あれからのこと)	1970	Released: 1970; Label: CBS/Sony	—	—	
"Don't Kiss Me Goodbye/Feel Of Love" (お別れにキスはしないで/予感)	1970	Released: 1970; Label: CBS/Sony	—	—	
"Now, The End/A Small Room for Love" (今、恋が終る/恋は女のさだめ)	1971	Released: 1971; Label: CBS/Sony	—	—	
"Queen Bee/Love’s Rondo" (女王蜂/嘘は大好き)	1971	Released: 1971; Label: CBS/Sony	—	—	
"A Bridge For Lovers/The Music Played" (恋人たちの橋/別れの朝)	1971	Released: 1971; Label: CBS/Sony	—	—	
"A Morning of Eros/Afraid to Meet Your Again" (エロスの朝/また逢う日がこわい)	1972	Released: 1972; Label: CBS/Sony	—	—	
"Like Strangers/Invitation of Honey" (他人の関係/蜜の誘惑)	1973	Released: 1973; Label: CBS/Sony	—	—	
"Ningenmoyoo/Ikini Aishite" (人間模様(にんげんもよう)/粋に愛して)	1973	Released: 1973; Label: CBS/Sony	—	—	
"Hatoba Elegy/Anatashidai" (波止場エレジー/あなたしだい)	1974	Released: 1974; Label: CBS/Sony	—	—	
"Magari Kado no Onna/Ah Mujo" (まがり角の女/ああ無情)	1974	Released: 1974; Label: CBS/Sony	—	—	
"Sankakukankei/Asahi no Yōni" (三角関係/朝陽のように)	1975	Released: 1975; Label: CBS/Sony	—	—	
"Ikutsu no Tokikashira/Onna no Kan" (いくつのときかしら/おんなの勘)	1975	Released: 1975; Label: CBS/Sony	—	—	
"Chiisana Tsumi/Hanabira no Kaseki" (ちいさな罪/花びらの化石)	1976	Released: 1976; Label: CBS/Sony	—	—	
"Haruka Naru Ai/Ai no Katarai" (遥かなる愛/愛の語らい)	1976	Released: 1976; Label: CBS/Sony	—	—	
"Twotone Color/Kigen Fukigen" (ツートン カラー/きげんふきげん)	1977	Released: 1977; Label: CBS/Sony	—	—	
"Yesterday, Yes A Day/Hitorigoto" (イエスタデイ・イエスタデイ/ひとりごと)	1977	Released: 1977; Label: CBS/Sony	—	—	
"Drin Drin Drin/Ochite Yuku Saki" (ドリン・ドリン・ドリン/堕ちてゆく先)	1979	Released: 1979; Label: CBS/Sony	—	—	
"Ai Samazama/Hatoba Elegy" (愛さまざま/波止場エレジー)	1982	Released: 1982; Label: CBS/Sony	—	—	

== Filmography ==
Year	Title	Role	Ref.
1969	Flower Action 009-1	Spade	
2016	Miss Granny	Midori Aihara	
