= Yume wa Yoru Hiraku =

"Keiko no Yume wa Yoru Hiraku"

Single by Keiko Fuji

from the album Shinjuku no Onna/ 'Enka no Hoshi' Fuji Keiko no Subete
- B-side: "Tokyo Nagaremono"
- Released: April 25, 1970
- Genre: Enka
- Length: 4:09
- Label: JVC
- Songwriters: Masao Ishisaka (lyric); Komei Sone (music)

Keiko Fuji singles chronology
"Onna no Blues" (1970)	"Keiko no Yume wa Yoru Hiraku" (1970)	"Inochi Azukemasu" (1970)

"Yume wa Yoru Hiraku" (夢は夜ひらく; lit. "Dream Opens at Night") is a Japanese song. The song was composed by Komei Sone. The song was originally noted down in a juvenile classification home.

The lyric of the song was re-written by various lyricists. Mari Sono's cover version of this song was released in 1966. However, the song is best known for being sung by enka singer Keiko Fuji. The song was included in her album Shinjuku no Onna/ 'Enka no Hoshi' Fuji Keiko no Subete (lit. "Woman in Shinjuku/ 'Star of Enka' All of Keiko Fuji") released on March 5, 1970. The album topped Japanese Oricon charts for 20 consecutive weeks. Her version of this song was named "Keiko no Yume wa Yoru Hiraku" (圭子の夢は夜ひらく). Her version of this song was released as a single on April 25, 1970. The single topped Oricon charts for 10 consecutive weeks.

Japanese folk rock singer Kan Mikami also released his version of this song with his new lyrics in 1972. However, his version was banned from being used on the air.
