= Kuroneko no Tango =

Tango song recorded in 1969

"Kuroneko no Tango" (Japanese: 黒ネコのタンゴ "Black Cat Tango"; originally Italian: Volevo un gatto nero "I wanted a black cat") is a tango song recorded in 1969 by young children in Italy and Japan.

The original Italian version was performed on 11 March 1969 in the Zecchino d'Oro, a televised Italian contest for songs sung by children, in which it finished joint 6th of 12 entries. It was written by "Framario" (Francesco and Mario Pagano), Armando Soricillo, and Francesco Saverio Maresca, and was sung by four-year-old Vincenza Pastorelli. In 2007, Pastorelli was arrested after an anti-prostitution operation dubbed "Gatto Nero" by Carabinieri; her appeal against a three-year prison sentence was pending in the Court of Cassation in October 2011.

Nippon Victor asked the leader of a Japanese school choir called "The Larks" to nominate a member to record a Japanese-language version of the song. She chose her nephew, Osamu Minagawa 皆川 おさむ (born 22 January 1963), whose recording was released on 5 October 1969. The song reached number one in the Oricon chart, and sold 3 million copies, making six-year-old Minagawa the youngest artist ever to have a million-selling record.

The Japanese lyrics bear no relation to the Italian ones beyond the central idea of a black cat. The Italian version is a children's song in which the singer complains at being given a white cat instead of a black one. The Japanese "black cat" symbolises the singer's flighty sweetheart, although Minagawa understood "Tango" to be the cat's name. The Japanese melody differs in rhythm in the verses, with the strong beats misaligned by 2 beats (half a measure) from the original Italian version, with a 2-beat rest inserted before the chorus to compensate.

The song has been covered many times since 1969. The song was covered in Japanese by Ami Tokito and in French by Japanese folk band めめ, both in 2005, and Meg recorded a cover of the original Italian song on her 2012 album La Japonaise. Justin Mauriello's 2010 Japanese release Justin Sings the Hits includes a version. The song’s melody was used in a Hebrew song originally performed by Tzipi Shavit with words by Yoram Taharlev, called "Kulam Halkhu LaJambo' " (Hebrew: כולם הלכו לג׳מבו "Everybody Has Gone to the Jumbo" (Note: Referring to Jumbo Musical, a musical variety show featuring many well-known talents of the time. Shavit, who was supposed to perform there, broke her foot mere days before the show was about to begin running; thus, Teharlev wrote a song for her to perform, playing a young girl’s dismay at being left home when all other family members have gone to see the Jumbo; shortly after they leave, she breaks her feet while wearing roller skates, presumably as she tries to go the Jumbo on her own, but ultimately manages to get her neighbour to take here there.)).. In Finnish the song is known as "Mustan kissan tango" (The Tango of the Black Cat). In Danish, the song is called “Min Kat Den Danser Tango” (meaning “My Cat Dances Tango”), in this case referring to an actual cat that dances the tango.

The song is on the 2014 album Dream a Little Dream by Pink Martini and The von Trapps.

In Korean, the song was first recorded in 1970 by six-year-old Park Hye-ryeong under the title "Black Cat Nero" (검은 고양이 네로). In 1995, it was remade by the South Korean music duo Turbo. In 2020, South Korean boy group Ateez won the music competition Immortal Songs with another remake of the song, which was released the following year as part of their collaboration with Kim Jong-kook, one of the members of Turbo. Boy group BXB also recorded a remake of the song in 2023.

== See also ==
- "Dur dur d'être bébé!" 1992 French single by four-year-old Jordy Lemoine
