= Hiroshi Uchiyamada and Cool Five =

Japanese musical group

Background information
- Also known as: Kiyoshi Maekawa and Cool Five; Cool Five
- Origin: Japan
- Genres: Kayōkyoku, enka, pop
- Years active: 1967–1990s 2006–present
- Labels: Victor Entertainment; BMG Japan
- Members: Kiyoshi Maekawa; Etsuro Miyamoto; Masaki Kobayashi; Masashi Osawa; Ryoma Nishida; Tetsuya Yamagami
- Past members: Hiroshi Uchiyamada; Takayuki Miyauchi; Shigemi Iwaki; Shigeru Morimoto

Hiroshi Uchiyamada and Cool Five (内山田洋とクール・ファイブ, Uchiyamada Hiroshi to Kūru Faibu) are a Japanese kayōkyoku group, formed by Hiroshi Uchiyamada (born Michio Uchiyamada, 1936–2006) in 1967 and fronted by the lead vocalist Kiyoshi Maekawa.

In 1969, the group debuted with the 11th Japan Record Award-winning song "Nagasaki wa Kyou mo Ame datta". They enjoyed a highly successful career mainly during the first half of the 1970s, producing numerous hit singles including "Awazu ni Aishite", "Uwasa no Onna","Soshite, Kōbe", "Nakanoshima Blues" and "Tokyo Sabaku". They lost popularity after the departure of their frontman in the late 1980s, and their career went into hiatus after the band lineup was radically altered around the 1990s.

After the band's founder died of lung cancer in 2006, the remaining members, including Maekawa, reunited.

== Band members ==
1967–1987	Hiroshi Uchiyamada (内山田 洋, Uchiyamada Hiroshi)(birthname: Michio Uchiyamada (内山田 道生, Uchiyamada Michio;; June 6, 1936 – November 3, 2006) - guitars, vocals; Kiyoshi Maekawa (前川 清, Maekawa Kiyoshi)(August 19, 1948 –) - lead vocals; Masaki Kobayashi (小林 正樹, Kobayashi Masaki)(January 1, 1943 –) - bass guitar, vocals; Etsuro Miyamoto (宮本 悦朗, Miyamoto Etsurou)(January 15, 1948 –) - keyboards, piano, vocals; Shigemi Iwaki (岩城 茂美, Iwaki Shigemi)(January 5, 1943 –) - saxophone, flute, vocals; Shigeru Morimoto (森本 繁, Morimoto Shigeru)(January 23, 1942 –) - drums, vocals

== Discography ==
=== Charting singles on the Japanese Oricon ===
Year	Single	Chart positions
Year	Single	JP
1969	"Nagasaki wa Kyō mo Ame Datta (長崎は今日も雨だった)"	2
1969	"Wakare Ame (わかれ雨)"	32
1969	"Awazu ni Aishite (逢わずに愛して)"	1
1970	"Ai no Tabiji wo (愛の旅路を)"	4
1970	"Uwasa no Onna (噂の女)"	2
1970	"Ai no Itazura (愛のいたずら)"	10
1971	"Subete wo Aishite (すべてを愛して)"	24
1971	"Onna no Iji (女の意地)"	43
1971	"Onna no Kuyashisa (女のくやしさ)"	26
1971	"Minato no Wakareuta (港の別れ唄)"	11
1971	"Hiren (悲恋)"	22
1972	"Kono Ai ni Ikite (この愛に生きて)"	7
1972	"Koiuta (恋唄)"	14
1972	"Soshite, Kōbe (そして、神戸)"	6
1973	"Otokonaki (男泣き)"	14
1973	"Shussen (出船)"	15
1973	"Umidori no Naku Hi ni (海鳥の鳴く日に)"	24
1973	"Kokorogawari (心がわり)"	32
1974	"Ame no Shinobiai (雨のしのび逢い)"	41
1974	"Banka (晩夏)"	64
1974	"Uminari (海鳴り)"	45
1975	"Uwasa (うわさ)"	41
1975	"Kita Hotel (北ホテル, Kita Hoteru)"	31
1975	"Nakanoshima Blues (中の島ブルース, Nakanoshima Brūsu)"	9
1975	"Futari no Midousuji (二人の御堂筋)"	44
1976	"Kimagure Ame (気まぐれ雨)"	40
1976	"Tokyo Sabaku (東京砂漠)"	19
1976	"Onna no Kawa (女の河)"	53
1977	"Saikai Blues (西海ブルース, Nakanoshima Brūsu)"	20
1977	"Futari no Kaikyou (二人の海峡)"	57
1977	"Omoikiri Bashi (思いきり橋)"	45
1977	"Minato no Wasuregusa (港の忘れ草)"	76
1978	"Ai no Tobira (愛の扉)"	91
1978	"Sayounara no Kanata e (さようならの彼方へ)"	56
1978	"Mukashi ga Arukara (昔があるから)"	91
1979	"Akirame Waltz (あきらめワルツ, Akirame Warutsu)"	83
1980	"Last Song"	87
1980	"Miwaku Shape Up (魅惑・シェイプアップ, Miwaku Sheipu Appu)"	93
1984	"Koi Saguri Yume Saguri (恋さぐり 夢さぐり)"	58

- The group released over 50 singles until Kiyoshi Maekawa left the band in 1987, and those sales have been estimated more than 5.9 million copies.

== Kōhaku Uta Gassen appearances ==
Year	#	Song	No.	VS	Remarks
1969 (Showa 44)/20th	1	Nagasaki Wa Kyoumo Amedatta (长崎は今日も雨だった)	19/23	Pinky & Killers	
1970 (Showa 45)/21st	2	Uwasa No Onna (噂の女)	13/24	Ryoko Moriyama	
1971 (Showa 46)/22nd	-	Minato No Wakareuta (港の別れ唄)	-/25	Fuji Keiko (original schedule)	Absent because of Kiyoshi Maekawa's illness. Replaced by Fuji Keiko and Four Leaves.
1974 (Showa 49)/25th	3	Uminari (海鳴り)	18/25	Mari Amachi	Returned after 3 years
1975 (Showa 50)/26th	4	Naka No Shima Blues (中の島ブルース)	12/24	Mina Aoe	
1976 (Showa 51)/27th	5	Tokyo Sabaku (東京砂漠)	6/24	Naomi Sagara	
1977 (Showa 52)/28th	6	Omoikiri Hashi (思い切り橋)	17/24	Mina Aoe (2)	
1978 (Showa 53)/29th	7	Hashigo Sake (さようならの彼方へ)	15/24	Hiromi Ōta	
1979 (Showa 54)/30th	8	Hashigo Sake (昔があるから)	19/23	Sayuri Ishikawa	
1980 (Showa 55)/31st	9	Hashigo Sake (魅惑・シェイプアップ)	10/23	Rumiko Koyanagi	
1981 (Showa 56)/32nd	10	Hashigo Sake (女・こぬか雨)	19/22	Sachiko Kobayashi	
1982 (Showa 57)/33th	11	Uwasa No Onna (2)	16/22	Miyuki Kawanaka	
2006 (Heisei 18)/57th	-	Nagasaki Wa Kyou Mo Amedatta	12/27	Masako Mori	Participate under the name of Kiyoshi Maekawa
2007 (Heisei 19)/58th	-	Soshite Koube (そして、神戸)	8/27	Kaori Mizumori	Participate under the name of Kiyoshi Maekawa
2008 (Heisei 20)/59th	-	Tokyo Sabaku	8/27	Miyuki Kawanaka	Participate under the name of Kiyoshi Maekawa
