= Keiko Fuji =

Japanese singer and actress (1951–2013)

- 藤 圭子
- Born: Junko Abe (阿部 純子); 5 July 1951; Ichinoseki, Iwate, Japan
- Died: 22 August 2013 (aged 62); Shinjuku, Tokyo, Japan
- Occupations: Singer; actress
- Spouses: Kiyoshi Maekawa (m. 1971; div. 1972) Teruzane Utada (m. 1982; div. 2007)
- Children: Hikaru Utada
- Musical career
- Genres: Enka; Pop
- Years active: 1969–1979, 1981–1998
- Labels: Victor Entertainment; RCA Records; BMG Japan; CBS Sony

Junko Utada (宇多田 純子, Utada Junko) (5 July 1951 – 22 August 2013), known primarily by the stage name Keiko Fuji (藤 圭子, Fuji Keiko) was a Japanese enka singer and actress. She had success in Japan in the 1960s and 1970s with her ballad-type songs. She was married on-and-off with Teruzane Utada, and was the mother of Japanese-American pop singer Hikaru Utada.

== Life and career ==
Fuji (sometimes credited as Keiko Fujita) was born in Iwate Prefecture, where her father was a rōkyoku singer. Her mother was a rōkyoku shamisen player . As a child, Fuji sometimes accompanied her parents and sang with them when they were on tour. Her song "Keiko no Yume wa Yoru Hiraku" (Keiko's version of "Yume wa Yoru Hiraku") won the Mass Popularity Award at the Japan Record Awards in 1970. She also performed this song in the 21st Kōhaku Uta Gassen New Year's Eve TV special.

Her debut album, Shinjuku no Onna/Enka no Hoshi Fuji Keiko no Subete (新宿の女/「演歌の星」藤圭子のすべて, Shinjuku Woman/"Star of Enka" All of Keiko Fuji), released 5 March 1970, topped the Oricon album chart for 20 consecutive weeks, and her next album Onna no Blues (女のブルース, Woman's Blues), released 5 July 1970, continued topping that chart for 17 consecutive weeks. She topped the Oricon album chart for a 37 consecutive weeks, an incredible record in Japan's music history. Her debut album's number-one record of 20 consecutive weeks remains the longest consecutive number-one record in Oricon history.

She married the enka singer Kiyoshi Maekawa and retired from singing in 1979, announcing her retirement during a TV show on 30 December of that year. The marriage ended in divorce, after which she emigrated to the United States, where she became active in music again by 1981. There, she married Teruzane Utada, a record producer. Their only child, Hikaru Utada, was born in 1983 in New York City (and later became a record-setting pop star in Japan by their late teens). The couple married and divorced seven times.

=== 2006 confiscation of money by the DEA ===
On 3 March 2006, U.S. DEA officials confiscated more than $420,000 in American, Canadian, and Australian currencies from Keiko Fuji's carry-on luggage at JFK Airport, New York, as she waited to board a flight to Las Vegas. Keiko denied any wrongdoing, and was not charged with any crime. However, the government initiated forfeiture proceedings, seeking to seize the money, which it alleged represented proceeds of drug sales or was intended to be used to buy drugs.

Keiko disputed the government's claim. In August 2008, the matter remained pending in Federal District Court in New York. On 27 January 2009, the Federal District Court in New York ordered the confiscated money returned to her, citing lack of evidence.

== Death ==
Keiko Fuji died on 22 August 2013 after jumping from the thirteenth floor of a condominium building in Shinjuku, Tokyo. No foul play was suspected. Her body was found on the grounds of her apartment building. Police said that her slippers were found at the end of her balcony, with no suicide note found. However, her daughter Hikaru Utada claims there was a suicide note.

== Discography ==
=== Like U3 ===
For U3 discography see Hikaru Utada discography

=== Solo ===
==== LPs ====
- Shinjuku no Onna / "Enka no Hoshi" Fuji Keiko no Subete – 5 March 1970
- Onna no Blues – 5 July 1970
- Utaitsugarete 25-nen Fuji Keiko Enka o Utau – 5 December 1970
- Saihate no Onna – 5 March 1971
- Keiko no Jinsei Gekijō – 5 July 1971
- Fuji Keiko Recital – 5 October 1971
- Keiko no Warabeuta – 25 December 1971
- Shiranai Machi de – 25 December 1971
- Fuji Keiko On Stage – 25 May 1972
- Wakare no Tabi – 25 June 1972
- Original Golden Hits Collection – 5 August 1972
- Tōkuheikitai / "Enka no Tabi" – 5 December 1972

==== CDs ====
- Fuji Keiko Densetsu no Meikyoku – 21 October 1999
- Kiite Kudasai Watashi no Jinsei: Fuji Keiko Collection – 20 December 2000
- Fuji Keiko Complete Single Collection: 15-nen no Kiseki – 21 September 2005
- Golden Best Fuji Keiko – 26 October 2005
- Super Best – 11 December 2005
- Golden Best Fuji Keiko Hit & Cover Collection Enka(艶歌) to Enka(縁歌) – 8 December 2010

==== Singles ====
- "Shinjuku no Onna" (25 September 1969)
- "Onna no Blues" (5 February 1970, Oricon number 1)
- "Keiko no Yume wa Yoru Hiraku" (25 April 1970, cover of "Yume wa Yoru Hiraku" by En Mari, Oricon number 1)
- "Inochi Azukemasu" (25 July 1970)
- "Onna wa Koi ni Ikiteiku" (25 October 1970)
- "Sai Hate no Onna" (5 February 1971)
- "Koi Jingi" (5 May 1971)
- "Michinoku Kouta" (5 June 1971)
- "Ai no Junrei " (5 July 1971)
- "Shiranai Machi de " (25 October 1971)
- "Kyōto kara Hakata made" (25 January 1972)
- "Wakare no Tabi" (25 May 1972)
- "Hana wa Nagarete" (25 September 1972)
- "Kanashimi no Machi" (5 December 1972)
- "Ashita kara Watashi wa" (25 March 1973)
- "Hana Kouta" (July 1973)
- "Henreki " (25 August 1973)
- "Koi no Yuki wa Risō " (5 November 1973)
- "Kyoto Blues" (5 April 1974)
- "Hi no kuni Kouta" (June 1974)
- "Watashi wa Kyōto e Kaerimasu" (5 July 1974)
- "Inochi Bi" (25 August 1974)
- "Anata no Uwasa " (January 1975)
- "Ikiteru dake no Onna" (25 April 1975)
- "Sasurai" (September 1975)
- "Hashigo zake" (5 November 1975)
- "Onna dakara" (25 April 1976)
- "Kiite Kudasai Watashi no Jinsei" (25 August 1976)
- "Aishū Sakaba " (5 February 1977)
- "Anata Hitosuji" (25 June 1977)
- "Omokage Heiya" (5 November 1977)
- "Ginza Nagare-uta" (May 1978)
- "Yoi-yoi Sakaba" (October 1978)
- "Kita no Minatomati" (March 1979)
- "Kawaii Onna " (October 1979)
- "Hotaru Bi" (October 1981)
- "Aitsu ga Warui " (1984)
- "Chōyo Hanayo to" (October 1984)
- "Tokyo Meiro" (June 1986)
- "Shinjuku Banka" (25 February 1987)
- "Tabiji" (1988)
- "Shinchi no Ame" feat. Katsurasanshi (February 1989)
- "Sake ni You hodo" (April 1994)
- "Tengoku" (August 1996)
- "Tsumetai Tsuki – Nakanaide" with Cubic U (September 1996)
- "Sennen no Kagaribi" (October 1996)
- "Otoko to Onna" (October 1997)
- "Oya Ko Bune" (13 February 2014)

== Select filmography ==
=== Movies ===
- Eiga Sakariba Nagashi-uta Shinjuku no Onna (1970, Nikkatsu)
- Zubekō Banchō Yume wa Yoru Hiraku (1970, Toei Company)
- Namida no Nagashi-uta Inochi Azukemasu (1970, Shochiku)
- Joshi Gakuen Yabai Sotsugyō (1970, Nikkatsu)
- Fuji Keiko waga Uta no aru Kagiri (1971, Shochiku)

=== Television ===
- Gozonji Kinsan Torimonochō "Shibai no Inochi Hi" (Episode 16, 1974, Nihon Educational Television/NET)
- Furimuku na Tsurukichi "Kantsubaki" (Episode 16, second part, 1975, NHK)
- Ikiteru dake no Kyōaku (Chapter 41-story license the second series of ruthless, NET, 1975)
- Hyōteki (Ryōko Ogura, 1979, KTV)
- Shin-kaikyō Monogatari (1981, TV Asahi)
- Nichiyō Emi Gekijō "Sabushiro no The Hatarake Kōgyō" (1986/1987, ABC)

== Kōhaku Uta Gassen Appearances ==
Year	#	Song	No.	VS	Remarks
1970 (Showa 45)/21st	1	Keiko No Yumewayoruhiraku (圭子の夢は夜ひらく)	13/24	Teruhiko Saigō	
1971 (Showa 46)/22nd	2	Michinoku Kouta (みちのく小唄)+Minato No Wakareuta (港の別れ唄*)	9/25	Hiroshi Uchiyamada and Cool Five (original schedule); Kazuo Funaki	*Replacing husband Kiyoshi Maekawa that fall ill.
1972 (Showa 47)/23rd	3	Kyoto Kara Hakatamade (京都から博多まで)	13/23	Kenichi Mikawa	
1975 (Showa 50)/26th	4	Sasurai (さすらい)	3/24	Masaaki Sakai	Returned after 3 years
1976 (Showa 51)/27th	5	Hashigo Sake (はしご酒)	15/24	Tonosama Kings	
