= Mina Aoe =

Japanese singer (1941-2000)

Mina Aoe 青江 三奈
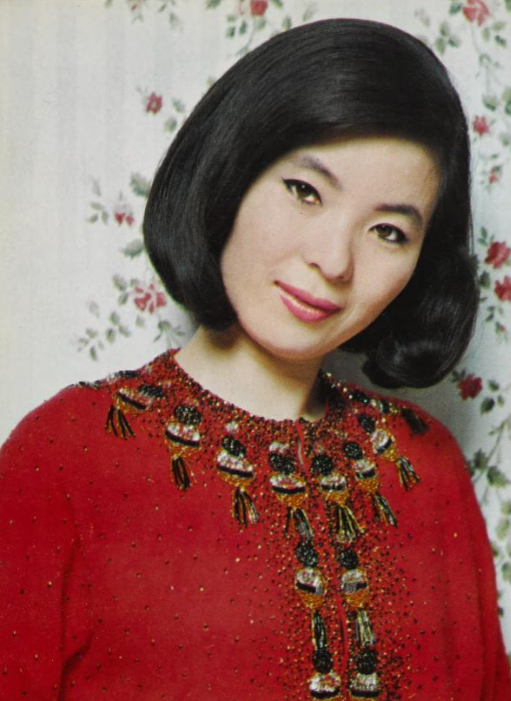

Background information
- Born: Shizuko Ihara (井原 静子); 7 May 1941; Tokyo, Japan
- Died: 2 July 2000 (aged 59)
- Genres: Enka, jazz
- Years active: 1966–1999
- Label: Victor Entertainment

Shizuko Ihara (井原 静子, Ihara Shizuko; 7 May 1941 – 2 July 2000 (pancreatic cancer)), professionally known as Mina Aoe (青江 三奈, Aoe Mina), was a Japanese female enka singer who had a series of popular hits in the late 1960s and continued charting late into her career.

With her distinctive husky voice, she acquired the nickname "Queen of the Blues". She appeared 18 times on the annual Kōhaku Uta Gassen show. After her death, a memorial to Aoe was established in the Isezakichō shopping area in Yokohama.

== Selected discography ==
- "Isezakicho Blues" (伊勢佐木町ブルース), 1968, one million sold
- "Ikebukuro no Yoru" (池袋の夜, One night at Ikebukuro) 1969, 1.5 million sold

== Kōhaku Uta Gassen Appearances ==
Year	#	Song	No.	VS	Remarks
1966 (Showa 41)/17th	1	Koukotsu No Blues (恍惚のブルース)	9/25	Jyou Takuya	
1968 (Showa 43)/19th	2	Isezakichou Blues (伊勢佐木町ブルース)	14/23	Ai Jyoji	Returned after 2 years
1969 (Showa 44)/20th	3	Ikebukuro No Yoru (池袋の夜)	1/23	Akira Fuse	First Batter
1970 (Showa 45)/21st	4	Kokusaisen Machiaishitsu/International Lobby (国際線待合室/インターナショナル・ロビー)	2/24	Saburō Kitajima	Second Finale
1971 (Showa 46)/22nd	5	Nagasaki Miren (長崎未練)	7/25	Hiroshi Itsuki	
1972 (Showa 47)/23rd	6	Nipponrettō Bunseki Minato Machi (日本列島・みなと町)	21/23	Hiroshi Itsuki (2)	
1973 (Showa 48)/24th	7	Nagasaki Blues (長崎ブルース)	18/22	Shinichi Mori	
1974 (Showa 49)/25th	8	Ginza Blue Night (銀座ブルーナイト)	22/25	Frank Nagai	
1975 (Showa 50)/26th	9	Kobe Kita Hotel (神戸北ホテル)	12/24	Hiroshi Uchiyamada and Cool Five	
1976 (Showa 51)/27th	10	Onna Kare Otoko Eno Tegami (女から男への手紙)	22/24	Saburō Kitajima (2)	
1977 (Showa 52)/28th	11	Minato Blues (みなとブルース)	17/24	Hiroshi Uchiyamada and Cool Five (2)	
1978 (Showa 53)/29th	12	Furareguse (ふられぐせ)	17/24	Hachiro Kasuga	
1979 (Showa 54)/30th	13	Morioka Blues (盛岡ブルース)	21/23	Hideo Murata	
1980 (Showa 53)/31st	14	Yoi Gokoro (酔心)	21/23	Hideo Murata (2)	
1981 (Showa 53)/32nd	15	Anata Ni Yurarete (あなたにゆられて)	15/22	Hideo Murata (3)	
1982 (Showa 53)/33rd	16	Isezakichou Blues (2)	10/22	Frank Nagai (2)	
1983 (Showa 53)/34th	17	Osaka Blues (大阪ブルース)	15/21	Southern All Stars	
1990 (Heisei 2)/41st	18	Koukotsu No Blues (2)	12/29	Toshiyuki Nishida	Returned after 7 years
