= Porno Graffitti discography =

- Studio albums: 13
- Compilation albums: 5
- Singles: 47
- Video albums: 22
- Digital singles: 3

Porno Graffitti is a Japanese rock band formed in 1994. As of September 2026, they have released forty-five singles, thirteen studio albums and five compilation albums. Also there are included numerous DVDs.

== Studio albums ==
No.	Title	Release date	Oricon peak
1	Romantist Egoist	March 8, 2000	4
2	foo?	February 28, 2001	2
3	Kumo o mo Tsukamu Tami	March 27, 2002	2
4	Worldillia	February 26, 2003	2
5	Thump^{χ}	April 20, 2005	1
6	m-CABI	November 26, 2006	2
7	Porno Graffitti	August 29, 2007	2
8	∠Trigger	March 24, 2010	1
9	Panorama Porno	March 28, 2012	2
10	Rhinoceros	August 19, 2015	1
11	Butterfly Effect	October 25, 2017	3
12	Akatsuki	August 3, 2022	5
13	Kajitsu	September 9, 2026	7

== Compilation albums ==
No.	Title	Release date	Oricon peak
1	Porno Graffitti Best Red's	July 28, 2004	2
2	Porno Graffitti Best Blue's	July 28, 2004	1
3	Porno Graffitti Best Ace	October 29, 2008	1
4	Porno Graffitti Best Joker	October 29, 2008	2
5	Porno Graffitti 15th Anniversary "All Time Singles"	November 20, 2013	1
6	Porno Graffitti Zensho ~ All Time Singles ~	September 4, 2024	

== Singles ==
No.	Title	Release date	Oricon peak
1	"Apollo"	September 8, 1999	5
2	"Hitori no Yoru"	January 26, 2000	12
3	"Music Hour"	July 12, 2000	5
4	"Saudade"	September 13, 2000	1
5	"Saboten"	December 6, 2000	1
6	"Agehachō"	June 27, 2001	1
7	"Voice"	October 17, 2001	2
8	"Shiawase ni tsuite Honki Dashite Kangaete Mita"	March 6, 2002	4
9	"Mugen"	May 15, 2002	3
10	"Uzu"	February 5, 2003	3
11	"Oto no Nai Mori"	August 6, 2003	5
12	"Melissa"	September 26, 2003	2
13	"Ai ga Yobu Hō e"	November 6, 2003	3
14	"Lack"	December 3, 2003	1
15	"Sister"	September 8, 2004	2
16	"Tasogare Romance"	November 10, 2004	3
17	"Neomelodramatic/Roll"	March 2, 2005	2
18	"NaNaNa Summer Girl"	August 3, 2005	3
19	"Yo Bailo/Don't Call me Crazy"	November 16, 2005	3
20	"Haneuma Rider"	June 28, 2006	2
21	"Winding Road"	October 4, 2006	1
22	"Link"	July 18, 2007	2
23	"Anata ga Koko no Itara"	February 13, 2008	1
24	"Itai Tachiichi"	June 25, 2008	3
25	"Gift"	August 20, 2008	2
26	"Love, too Death,too"	October 8, 2008	2
27	"Koyoi, Tsuki ga Miezutomo"	December 10, 2008	2
28	"Kono Mune o, Ai o Iyo"	September 9, 2009	2
29	"Anima Rossa"	November 25, 2009	3
30	"Hitomi no Oku o Nozokasete"	February 10, 2010	4
31	"Kimi wa 100%"	October 27, 2010	2
32	"Exit"	March 2, 2011	5
33	"One More Time"	September 21, 2011	4
34	"Yuki no Iro"	November 23, 2011	8
35	"2012 Spark"	February 8, 2012	3
36	"Kageboushi"	September 19, 2012	3
37	"Matataku Hoshi no Shita de"	March 6, 2013	3
38	"Seishun Hanamichi"	September 11, 2013	4
39	"Tokyo Destiny"	October 16, 2013	5
40	"Oretachi no Celebration"	September 3, 2014	4
41	"One Woman Show: Amai Maboroshi"	November 5, 2014	5
42	"Oh! Rival"	April 15, 2015	5
43	"THE DAY"	May 25, 2016	4
44	"LiAR/Masshiro na Hai ni naru made, Moyashi tsukuse"	November 11, 2016	6
45	"King & Queen/Montage"	September 6, 2017	5
46	"Chameleon Lens"	March 21, 2018	6
47	"Breath"	July 25, 2018	5
48	"VS"	July 31, 2019	8
49	"Theme Song"	September 22, 2022	5
50	"Kaihōku"	March 27, 2024	4
51	"The Revo"	November 19, 2025	3

== Digital singles ==
No.	Title	Release date
1	"m-FLOOD"	February 28, 2007
2	"Zombies Are Standing Out"	September 28, 2018
3	"Flower"	December 28, 2018
