= 2012 Spark =

Single by Porno Graffitti

from the album Panorama Porno
- Released: February 8, 2012
- Genre: Pop-rock
- Length: 12:53
- Label: SME Records
- Songwriters: Akihito Okano; Haruichi Shindō

Porno Graffitti singles chronology
"'Yuki no Iro'" (2011)	"2012 Spark" (2012)	"'Kageboushi'" (2012)

2012 Spark (2012 Spark) is Porno Graffitti's 35th single. It was released on February 8, 2012, by SME Records.

== Overview ==
This is the first release in about three months since their previous work Yuki no Iro. It is their first work of 2012 and the lead single from the album PANORAMA PORNO.

The title song was written as the theme song for the movie Ace Attorney (released February 11, 2012, distributed by Toho). This is the fourth time in total, and the first time in nine works (three years and two months) that the band has collaborated on a theme song for a movie since Koyoi, Tsuki ga Miezutomo. The titles of the new songs included in this album all incorporate numbers.

As with One More Time and Yuki no Iro, a different arranger was brought in for each song under the direction of total producer Akihiko Homma.

Following on from the previous album, the album will be released in two versions: a limited edition and a regular edition. The limited edition is a two-disc set consisting of a CD and a DVD, and the third track on the CD (M-3) and the DVD contain the audio and video of a studio session (Haneuma Rider ~Makuhari Ver.~ Studio Session) that recreates Haneuma Rider from Makuhari Romance Porno '11 ~DAYS OF WONDER~.

On January 25, 2012, the chakuuta version of 2012Spark was released on various music distribution sites. On the same day, Sony Music opened an official Porno Graffitti YouTube channel, where the full version was released along with video clips of their previous works.

The video clip for this work is the first in a Japanese music video to use topic lights (laser lighting), and the lighting effects are completely computer-generated, making the video look realistic from beginning to end. In order to make the most of the lasers, detailed settings were repeatedly adjusted, and filming continued until the early hours of the morning. According to Haruichi Shindo, the video was shot in December 2011 (before Christmas). Since its release on YouTube, the video has received positive feedback, and the video was first shown on TV Asahi's Music Station (broadcast on February 10, 2012) in front of 250 fans, with the topic lights used in the live performance. The music video for 2012Spark released on YouTube has exceeded 500,000 views by April 1, 2012.

On February 8, the day of the film's release, Porno Graffitti's official website underwent a pre-renewal (and was officially relaunched on February 14). On the same day, they made a guest appearance at the 6th Takashi Miike Director Presents: Adults Only Space event, hosted by Takashi Miike and Hiroki Narimiya.

== Track listing ==
No.	Title	Length
1.	"2012 Spark"	4:07
2.	"9.9 m^{2}"	3:24
3.	"Haneuma Rider - Makuhari version - Studio Session" (ハネウマライダー 〜幕張Ver.〜 Studio Session)	5:22

== Release List ==
region	information	standard	the work	Source
Japan	January 25, 2012	Video Clip	"2012Spark"	YouTube
Japan	January 25, 2012	Ringtones (ringtones)	"2012Spark"	Recochoku
Japan	January 25, 2012	Chakuuta (ringtone)	"2012Spark" Intro Ver.	Amyu Mobile; Sony music sound; Recochoku; dwango; music.jp; JOYSOUND; Oricon; mu-mo; HAPPY song; Yamaha Music Media; Tsutaya Online
Japan	January 25, 2012	Chakuuta (ringtone)	"2012Spark" 1st chorus version	Amyu Mobile; Sony music sound; Recochoku; dwango; music.jp; JOYSOUND; Oricon; mu-mo; HAPPY song; Yamaha Music Media; Tsutaya Online
Japan	January 25, 2012	Chakuuta (ringtone)	"2012Spark" Last Chorus Ver.	Amyu Mobile; Sony music sound; Recochoku; dwango; music.jp; JOYSOUND; Oricon; mu-mo; HAPPY song; Yamaha Music Media; Tsutaya Online
Japan	February 1, 2012	Chakuuta Full (R)	"2012Spark"	Amyu Mobile; Sony music sound; Recochoku; dwango; music.jp; JOYSOUND; Oricon; mu-mo; HAPPY song; Yamaha Music Media; Tsutaya Online
Japan	February 8, 2012	CD	"2012Spark"	SME Records
Japan	February 8, 2012	Chakuuta (ringtone)	"9.9 m^{2}" Intro Ver.	Amyu Mobile; Sony music sound; Recochoku; dwango; music.jp; JOYSOUND; Oricon; mu-mo; HAPPY song; Yamaha Music Media; Tsutaya Online
Japan	February 8, 2012	Chakuuta (ringtone)	"9.9 m^{2}" Last Chorus Ver.	Amyu Mobile; Sony music sound; Recochoku; dwango; music.jp; JOYSOUND; Oricon; mu-mo; HAPPY song; Yamaha Music Media; Tsutaya Online
Japan	February 8, 2012	Chakuuta (ringtone)	"Haneuma Rider ~Makuhari Ver.~ Studio Session" A-melody Ver.	Amyu Mobile; Sony music sound; Recochoku; dwango; music.jp; JOYSOUND; Oricon; mu-mo; HAPPY song; Yamaha Music Media; Tsutaya Online
Japan	February 8, 2012	Chakuuta (ringtone)	"Haneuma Rider ~Makuhari Ver.~ Studio Session" 1st chorus Ver.	Amyu Mobile; Sony music sound; Recochoku; dwango; music.jp; JOYSOUND; Oricon; mu-mo; HAPPY song; Yamaha Music Media; Tsutaya Online
Japan	February 8, 2012	Chakuuta (ringtone)	"Haneuma Rider ~Makuhari Ver.~ Studio Session" Chorus Ver.	Amyu Mobile; Sony music sound; Recochoku; dwango; music.jp; JOYSOUND; Oricon; mu-mo; HAPPY song; Yamaha Music Media; Tsutaya Online

== Participating musicians ==
Porno Graffitti
Akihito Okano	Vocals, Chorus
Haruichi Shindo	Guitars ( electric guitars, acoustic guitars, gadget guitars )
Guest Musicians
M-1 " 2012Spark "
Yutaka Tamada ( 100s )	Drums
Yuichi Takama (Jumping Mustard / Former Jack&Betty )	base
Daisuke Kadowaki Strings (formerly Clacks )	Strings ( Violin )
tasuku	Programming, editing and other audio sources
M-2 " 9.9 m^{2} "
Yuya Ishii ( Dt. / Former member of SHURIKEN )	Drums
Ryo Eguchi ( Stereo Fabrication of Youth )	Other sources
M-3 " Haneuma Rider ~Makuhari Ver.~ Studio Session "
Matsubara "Matsukichi" Hiroshi	Drums
Sting Miyamoto	base
Keiji Matsumoto (former T-SQUARE )	Apf, Epf
Crusher Kimura	Violin
Kazuya Sugiyama (Big Boat Spirit)	Instrumental Technician

== Tie-up ==
Music	tie-up
M-1 "2012 Spark"	Theme song for the Toho -distributed film " Ace Attorney "

== Album ==
- PANORAMA PORNO (#1, PANORAMA ver.)
- PORNO GRAFFITTI 15th Anniversary: ALL TIME SINGLES (#1)
