= List of Hot 100 number-one singles of 2008 (Japan) =

This is a list of number ones on the Billboard Japan Hot 100 chart in 2008.

Issue date	Song	Artist	Ref
January 16	"Stay Gold"	Hikaru Utada	
January 23	"Be Free"	Greeeen	
January 30	"Deai no Kakera"	Ketsumeishi	
February 6	"Soba ni Iru ne"	Thelma Aoyama featuring SoulJa	
February 13	"Lips"	KAT-TUN	
February 20	"Anata ga Koko ni Itara"	Porno Graffitti	
February 27	"Step and Go"	Arashi	
March 5	"Taiyō no Namida"	NEWS	
March 12	"Sono Mama"	SMAP	
March 19	"Wahaha"	Kanjani Eight	
March 26	"Fight the Blues"	Hikaru Utada	
April 2	"New Look"	Namie Amuro	
April 9	"Kurikaesu Haru"	244 Endli-x	
April 16	"Shuchishin"	Shuchishin	
April 23	"Burn (Fumetsu no Face)"	B'z	
April 30	"Bleeding Love"	Leona Lewis	
May 7	"No More"	Tsukasa Maizu	
May 19	"Summer Time"	NEWS	
May 26	"Don't U Ever Stop"	KAT-TUN	
June 2	"Dreams Come True"	Hey! Say! JUMP	
June 9	"Kiseki"	Greeeen	
June 16	"Kiseki"	Greeeen	
June 23	"Verb"	Glay	
June 30	"Ai Ai Gasa"	Tegomass	
July 7	"One Love"	Arashi	
July 14	"Summer Song"	Yui	
July 21	"Love the World"	Perfume	
July 28	"Make My Day"	Yui Aragaki	
August 4	"Your Seed"	Hey! Say! JUMP	
August 11	"Gift"	Mr. Children	
August 18	"I Am Your Singer"	Southern All Stars	
August 25	"Kono Toki Kitto Yume Jya Nai"	SMAP	
September 1	"Truth"	Arashi	
September 8	"Secret Code"	KinKi Kids	
September 15	"Hanabi"	Mr. Children	
September 22	"Hanabi"	Mr. Children	
September 29	"Tegami (Haikei Jūgo no Kimi e)"	Angela Aki	
October 6	"The Birthday: Ti Amo"	Exile	
October 13	"Happy Birthday"	NEWS	
October 20	"Love, too Death,too"	Porno Graffitti	
October 27	"Akai Ito"	Yui Aragaki	
November 3	"Mayonaka no Shadow Boy"	Hey! Say! JUMP	
November 10	"Musekinin Hero"	Kanjani Eight	
November 17	"Beautiful Days"	Arashi	
November 24	"Tsuretette Tsuretette"	Dreams Come True	
December 1	"Hakanaku mo Towa no Kanashi"	Uverworld	
December 8	"Last Christmas"	Exile	
December 15	"White X'mas"	KAT-TUN	
December 22	"Yowamushi Santa"	Shuchishin	
December 29	"Days"	Ayumi Hamasaki	
