= Kimi wa 100% =

Single by Porno Graffitti

from the album Panorama Porno
- Released: October 27, 2010
- Genre: Pop-rock
- Length: 12:50
- Label: SME Records

Porno Graffitti singles chronology
"'Hitomi no Oku wo Nozokasete'" (2010)	"Kimi wa 100%" (2010)	"'EXIT'" (2011)

Kimi wa 100% (君は100%) is the thirty-first single by the Japanese Pop-rock band Porno Graffitti. It was released on October 27, 2010.

== Track listing ==
No.	Title	Length
1.	"Kimi wa 100%" (君は100%)	4:05
2.	"Kemuri" (煙)	4:04
3.	"Get It On"	4:41
