= Mugen =

Mugen, a word of Japanese origin meaning "infinite", may refer to:

- "Mugen" (Nana Mizuki song), 2009
- "Mugen" (Porno Graffitti song), 2002
- M.U.G.E.N, a freeware 2D fighting game engine
- Mugen Motorsports, a Japanese automotive company
- Mugen Seiki, a Japanese manufacturer of radio-controlled cars
- Mugen (town), in Guiping, Guangxi, China
- Mugen, a character in the Japanese anime series Samurai Champloo
