= Akihito (disambiguation) =

Akihito (born 1933) was the Japanese emperor from 1989 to 2019.

Akihito may also refer to:

- Akihito (fish), a genus of fish native to Vanuatu
- Akihito (given name), Japanese masculine given name
