= Buzy (band) =

Japanese female pop music group

- Also known as: COLOR (1998-2002)
- Origin: Kansai region, Japan
- Genres: Pop
- Years active: 1998–2006
- Labels: Warner Music Japan; Imperial Records
- Members: Nao Tōyama; Mayumi Niwa; Mao Miyazato; Yurisa Asama; Sachiko Iwanaga; Yumi Takeda
- Past members: Komugi Kadota
- Website: https://www.teichiku.co.jp/artist/buzy/

Buzy was a Japanese female pop music group, made up of members Nao Tōyama, Mayumi Niwa, Mao Miyazato, Yurisa Asama, Sachiko Iwanaga and Yumi Takeda. The group originally formed in 1998 as COLOR and consisted of Tōyama, Miyazato, Niwa, and Komugi Kadota, and released five singles and two albums between 1999 and 2001. As Buzy, they released their first single "Kujira" in 2004. They are well known for the song "Be Somewhere", used as the opening theme of the anime series Rockman EXE Stream, back in 2005. They also performed the opening theme song for Twin Spica, "Venus Say", a version of "Kujira" with different lyrics. The group's name stands for "Blend, Unique, Zipping, and You just wait." Many of their songs were written and composed by Porno Graffitti guitarist and lyricist Haruichi Shindō. Buzy disbanded in June 2006. Members Nao, Mayumi and Mao went on to form MANSAKU with former Boystyle members Kayoko and Yukina.

== Members ==
- Nao Tōyama (當山 奈央, Tōyama Nao, b. February 22, 1984, from Osaka)
- Mayumi Niwa (丹羽 麻由美, Niwa Mayumi, b. September 12, 1984, from Osaka)
- Mao Miyazato (宮里 真央, Miyazato Mao, b. April 19, 1983, from Osaka)
- Komugi Kadota (門田 こむぎ, Kadota Komugi, b. April 27, 1983, from Osaka) (left in 2002)
- Yurisa Asama (朝間 ユリサ, Asama Yurisa, b. July 27, 1984, from Kyoto)
- Sachiko Iwanaga (岩永 幸子, Iwanaga Sachiko, b. May 19, 1986, from Osaka)
- Yumi Takeda (竹田 侑美, Takeda Yumi, b. October 29, 1986, from Kobe)

== Discography ==
=== Singles ===
- 2004.03.03 - "Kujira (鯨)"
- 2004.07.07 - "Hitori Ichizu (一人一途)"
- 2005.01.26 - "Be Somewhere"
- 2005.11.09 - "Passion (パシオン)"

=== Albums ===
- Buzy (January 25, 2006)
1. Whale (鯨, Kujira)
2. Alone In Earnest (一人一途, Hitori ichizu)
3. I Love You, You Love Me (あなたを愛す私を愛す, Anata o aisu watashi o aisu)
4. When the Cosmos Blooms (コスモスの咲く頃に, Cosmos no saku koro ni)
5. Passion (パシオン, Pashion)
6. Remake (リメイク, Rimeiku)
7. White Bicycle (白い自転車, Shiroi jitensha)
8. Keep Silence
9. Be Somewhere
10. Rav & Business
11. Buzy
12. If It's Sunny Tomorrow (アシタ晴レタラ, Ashita haretara)
13. [HIDDEN TRACK] >> No One Ever Felt That Way About Her (あんなにあのコの事を想ってる奴はいなかった, Anna ni ano ko no koto o omotteru yatsu wa inakatta) by NAO
