= Agehachō =

Single by Porno Graffitti

from the album Kumo o mo Tsukamu Tami
- Released: June 27, 2001
- Genre: Rock
- Length: 14:17
- Label: SME Records

Porno Graffitti singles chronology
"'Saboten'" (2000)	"Agehachō" (2001)	"'Voice'" (2001)

Agehachō (アゲハ蝶) (English: Swallowtail Butterfly) is the sixth single released by the Japanese pop-rock band Porno Graffitti. It was released on June 27, 2001.

== Track listing ==
No.	Title	Length
1.	"Ageha Chō" (アゲハ蝶)	4:41
2.	"Wakarebanashi o Shiyou" (別れ話をしよう)	4:48
3.	"Okami (Wolf)" (狼)	4:48

== Certifications ==
Certifications for "Agehachō"
Region	Certification	Certified units/sales
Streaming
Japan (RIAJ)	Platinum	100,000,000^{†}
^{†} Streaming-only figures based on certification alone.
