= Oto no Nai Mori =

Single by Porno Graffitti
- Released: August 6, 2003
- Genre: Rock
- Length: 8:46
- Label: SME Records

Porno Graffitti singles chronology
"'Uzu'" (2003)	"Oto no Nai Mori" (2003)	"'Melissa'" (2003)

Oto no Nai Mori (音のない森) (English: Soundless Forest) is the eleventh single by the Japanese pop-rock band Porno Graffitti. It was released on August 6, 2003. Now his is "another one of the Oto no Nai Mori" in to listen continuously for 3 songs. Singles A side single has been recorded is sandwiched between the coupling piece is only this single.

== Track listing ==
No.	Title	Length
1.	"Awe"	1:26
2.	"Oto no Nai Mori" (音のない森)	4:58
3.	"Sonic"	2:22
