= Romantist Egoist =

Studio album by Porno Graffitti
- Released: March 8, 2000
- Recorded: 1999–2000
- Genre: J-pop
- Length: 60:12
- Label: SME Records
- Producer: Porno Graffitti

Porno Graffitti chronology
Romantist Egoist (2000)	foo? (2001)

Singles from Romantist Egoist
- 1. "Apollo" Released: September 8, 1999; 2. "Hitori no Yoru" Released: January 26, 2000

Romantist Egoist (Japanese:ロマンチスト・エゴイスト) is the debut album by the Japanese rock band Porno Graffitti, it was released on March 8, 2000.

It contains a total of 13 songs, including the debut single "Apollo" and this album's lead single "Hitori no Yoru". Most of the songs on the album were created before the band's major label debut.

== Track listing ==
No.	Title	Length
1.	"Jazz up"	4:35
2.	"Century Lovers"	4:30
3.	"Hitori no Yoru" (ヒトリノ夜 / Lonely Night)	4:05
4.	"Lion" (ライオン)	4:50
5.	"Yushoku 〜Love is you〜" (憂色〜Love is you〜 / Gloom 〜Love is you〜)	5:07
6.	"Heart Beat"	4:39
7.	"Machine Gun Talk" (マシンガントーク)	4:14
8.	"Draw #1" (デッサン#1)	4:55
9.	"Apollo (New Apollo Project Version)" (アポロ (New Apollo Project Version))	4:29
10.	"Love You, Love You" (ラビュー･ラビュー)	4:32
11.	"Dilemma (How to Play "Didgeridoo" Version)" (ジレンマ (How To Play "didgeridoo" Version))	4:20
12.	"Libido" (リビドー)	4:32
13.	"Romantist Egoist" (ロマンチスト･エゴイスト)	5:18
