= Akihito (given name) =

- Gender: Male

Origin
- Origin: Japanese
- Meaning: Different meanings depending on the kanji used

Akihito (written: 明仁, 明人, 昭仁, 顕仁, 章仁, 暁人, 彰人, 昭人 or 章人) is a masculine Japanese given name. Notable people with the name include:

- Akihito (明仁; born 1933), 125th Emperor of Japan
- Akihito (Emperor Sutoku) (顕仁; 1119–1164), 75th Emperor of Japan
- Akihito Fujii (藤井 彰人; born 1976), Japanese baseball player
- Akihito Hirose (広瀬 章人; born 1987), Japanese shogi player
- Akihito Kusunose (楠瀬 章仁; born 1986), Japanese footballer
- Akihito Motohashi (本橋 昭人), Japanese Paralympic athlete
- Akihito Okano (岡野昭仁),Japanese musician and vocalist,lead vocalist of Japanese rock band Porno Graffitti
- Akihito Sawafuji (澤藤 章人; born 1976), Japanese professional wrestler
- Akihito Sugisawa (杉沢 明人; born 1967), Japanese ice hockey player
- Akihito Tokunaga (徳永 暁人; born 1971), Japanese musician and composer
- Akihito Yamada (山田 章仁; born 1985), Japanese rugby union player
- Akihito Yokoyama (横山 明仁; born 1961), Japanese golfer
- Akihito Yoshitomi (吉富 昭仁), Japanese manga artist
