= Exit (Porno Graffitti song) =

Single by Porno Graffitti

from the album Panorama Porno
- Released: March 2, 2011
- Genre: Pop-rock
- Length: 15:09
- Label: SME Records

Porno Graffitti singles chronology
"Kimi wa 100%" (2010)	"Exit" (2011)	"One More Time" (2011)

"Exit" is the thirty-second single by the Japanese Pop-rock band Porno Graffitti. It was released on March 2, 2011.

== Track listing ==
No.	Title	Length
1.	"Exit"	5:22
2.	"Regret"	4:44
3.	"Live on Live [Recorded at Yokohama Arena from 11th Live Circuit "Target" Encore (2010/12/31)]"	5:03
