= Lack (song) =

Single by Porno Graffitti
- Released: December 3, 2003
- Genre: Rock
- Length: 9:36
- Label: SME Records

Porno Graffitti singles chronology
"'Ai ga Yobu Hō e'" (2003)	"Lack" (2003)	"'Sister'" (2004)

Lack (ラック) is the fourteenth single by the Japanese pop-rock band Porno Graffitti. It was released on December 3, 2003. The work was released in 2003 in his fifth, it was concluded the release rush from the same year in August. First 100,000 Limited Edition release. Tama enrolled at the time at the end of the single, there is his due also the last of the composer A surface. In addition, the jacket or lyric members three photos have been used has become a single work now is the last.

== Track listing ==
No.	Title	Length
1.	"Lack" (ラック)	3:51
2.	"Theme of '74ers'"	2:20
3.	"Another day for '74ers'"	3:24
