= Matataku Hoshi no Shita de =

Single by Porno Graffitti
- Released: March 6, 2013
- Genre: Pop-rock
- Length: 16:17
- Label: SME Records

Porno Graffitti singles chronology
"'Kageboushi'" (2012)	"Matataku Hoshi no Shita de" (2013)	"'Seishun Hanamichi'" (2013)

Matataku Hoshi no Shita de (瞬く星の下で English: Under the twinkling stars) is the thirty-seventh single by the Japanese Pop-rock band Porno Graffitti. It was released on March 6, 2013. The song was used as the second opening of the anime series Magi: The Labyrinth of Magic. The single peaked at third position on Oricon Singles Chart, charting for ten weeks.

== Track listing ==
No.	Title	Length
1.	"Matataku Hoshi no Shita de" (瞬く星の下で)	3:47
2.	"Gokujo Landing" (極上ランディング)	4:10
3.	"Mukaiawase" (むかいあわせ)	5:52
