= Fixer (While the Women Are Sleeping) =

Single by Akina Nakamori

from the album Fixer
- B-side: "Hirari (Sakura)"
- Released: February 24, 2016
- Recorded: 2015
- Genre: J-pop; dance-pop
- Length: 5:00
- Label: Utahime Records; Universal J
- Songwriter(s): Miran; Dream Productions; Brian Lee

Akina Nakamori singles chronology
"Unfixable" (2015)	"Fixer (While the Women Are Sleeping)" (2016)

"Fixer (While the Women Are Sleeping)" is the 51st single by Japanese singer Akina Nakamori. Written by Nakamori (under the pseudonym "Miran"), Dream Productions, and Brian Lee, the single was released on February 24, 2016, by Utahime Records and Universal Music Japan. This was Nakamori's second English-language single after "Unfixable". It was also the third single from her 24th studio album Fixer.

== Background ==
"Fixer (While the Women Are Sleeping)" was used as the image song for the 2016 film While the Women Are Sleeping. The B-side is "Hirari (Sakura)", co-written by Haruichi Shindō. The CD is arranged in an unconventional way, with the B-side playing before the main track.

== Chart performance ==
"Fixer (While the Women Are Sleeping)" peaked at No. 32 on Oricon's weekly singles chart and sold over 4,300 copies.

== Track listing ==
CD
No.	Title	Lyrics	Music	Arrangement	Length
1.	"Hirari (Sakura)" ((ひらり -SAKURA-, "Lightly (Sakura)"))	Haruichi Shindō	Kōhei Munemoto	Munemoto; Takahiro "Johnny" Morita	4:25
2.	"Fixer (While the Women Are Sleeping)"	Miran; Dream Productions; Brian Lee	Miran; Dream Productions; Lee	Miran; Dream Productions; Lee	5:00
3.	"Hirari (Sakura)" (Instrumental)				4:25
4.	"Fixer (While the Women Are Sleeping)" (Instrumental)				5:00
Total length:					18:50

== Charts ==
Chart (2015)	Peak position
Japan (Oricon)	32
Japan (Billboard Top Singles Sales)	26
