= Seishun Hanamichi =

Single by Porno Graffitti
- Released: September 11, 2013
- Genre: Pop rock
- Length: 14:38
- Label: SME Records

Porno Graffitti singles chronology
"Matataku Hoshi no Shita de" (2013)	"Seishun Hanamichi" (2013)	"Tokyo Destiny" (2013)

"Seishun Hanamichi" (青春花道; English: "Youth runway") is the thirty-eighth single by the Japanese pop rock band Porno Graffitti. It was released on September 11, 2013.

== Track listing ==
No.	Title	Length
1.	"Seishun Hanamichi" (青春花道)	4:04
2.	"Epicurean" (エピキュリアン)	3:45
3.	"Oideyo Santa Monica (Instrumental)" (おいでよサンタモニカ (Instrumental))	2:35
4.	"Seishun Hanamichi (Original karaoke)" (青春花道 (オリジナル・カラオケ))	4:04
