= Itai Tachiichi =

Single by Porno Graffitti
- Released: June 25, 2008
- Genre: Pop-rock
- Length: 13:18
- Label: SME Records

Porno Graffitti singles chronology
"'Anata ga Koko no Itara'" (2008)	"Itai Tachiichi" (2008)	"'Gift'" (2008)

Itai Tachiichi (痛い立ち位置) (English: Painful standing position) is the twenty-fourth single by the Japanese pop-rock band Porno Graffitti. It was released on June 25, 2008.

== Track listing ==
No.	Title	Length
1.	"Itai Tachiichi" (痛い立ち位置)	4:26
2.	"Summer page" (サマーページ)	4:56
3.	"Night train" (ナイトトレイン)	3:56
