= One Woman Show: Amai Maboroshi =

Single by Porno Graffitti
- Released: November 5, 2014
- Genre: Rock
- Length: 11:58
- Label: SME Records

Porno Graffitti singles chronology
"Oretachi no Celebration" (2014)	"One Woman Show: Amai Maboroshi" (2014)

"One Woman Show: Amai Maboroshi" (ワン・ウーマン・ショー 〜甘い幻〜) is the 41st single by the Japanese pop-rock band Porno Graffitti. It was released in November 5, 2014 and reached the 4th place in the Oricon Singles Chart.

== Track listing ==
No.	Title	Length
1.	"One Woman Show: Amai Maboroshi" (ワン・ウーマン・ショー 〜甘い幻〜)	4:07
2.	"Nani wanakutomo" (なにはなくとも)	4:28
3.	"Minna no Carp" (みんなのカープ)	3:23
