= One More Time (Porno Graffitti song) =

Single by Porno Graffitti

from the album Panorama Porno
- Released: September 21, 2011
- Genre: Pop-rock
- Length: 14:11
- Label: SME Records

Porno Graffitti singles chronology
"'EXIT'" (2011)	"One More Time" (2011)	"'Yuki no Iro'" (2011)

One More Time is the thirty-third single by the Japanese Pop-rock band Porno Graffitti. It was released on September 21, 2011.

== Track listing ==
No.	Title	Length
1.	"One More Time" (ワンモアタイム)	4:07
2.	"My Model" (マイモデル)	4:21
3.	"Goodbye Summer" (グッバイサマー)	5:43
