= Porno Graffitti (album) =

Studio album by Porno Graffitti
- Released: August 29, 2007
- Genre: J-Pop
- Length: 54:45
- Label: SME Records
- Producer: Porno Graffitti

Porno Graffitti chronology
m-CABI (2006)	Porno Graffitti (2007)	∠ Trigger (2010)

Porno Graffitti (Stylized as PORNO GRAFFITTI) is the seventh studio album by the Japanese pop-rock band Porno Graffitti. It was released on August 29, 2007.

== Track listing ==
No.	Title	Length
1.	"Link" (リンク)	3:59
2.	"Utsu Semi" (空蝉)	3:42
3.	"Walker" (ウォーカー)	5:00
4.	"Bears" (ベアーズ)	4:08
5.	"Nōfu to Akai Scarf" (農夫と赤いスカーフ)	4:27
6.	"Tettsui" (鉄槌)	4:22
7.	"Light and Shadow"	3:27
8.	"My 80's"	3:44
9.	"Rock Band ga Yattekita" (ロックバンドがやってきた)	2:46
10.	"Please say yes, yes, yes"	3:52
11.	"Sora Iro" (そらいろ)	5:37
