= Fixer (Akina Nakamori album) =

2015 studio album by Akina Nakamori

Studio album by Akina Nakamori
- Released: 30 December 2015
- Recorded: 2014−2015 (United States)
- Genre: J-pop; EDM
- Length: 63:20
- Language: Japanese; English
- Label: Universal Music Japan
- Producer: Don Flamingo; Naoshi Fujikura; Masahiko Kazumoto

Akina Nakamori chronology
Utahime 4: My Eggs Benedict (2015)	Fixer (Akina Nakamori album) (2015)	Belie (2015)

Singles from Fixer
- 1. "Rojo (Tierra)" Released: 21 January 2015; 2. "Unfixable" Released: 30 September 2015; 3. "Fixer (While the Women Are Sleeping)" Released: 24 February 2016

Fixer (stylized as FIXER) is the 24th studio album by Japanese singer-songwriter Akina Nakamori and first studio album to be released during the 2010s. It was released on 30 December 2015 under the Universal Music Japan label. It's Nakamori's first original album after a six-year hiatus.

The album includes Akina's original written songs: "Fixer (While the Women Are Sleeping)" and "Rojo (Tierra)". The album includes both original and renewed version of the songs.

The album was released in regular and limited editions. Limited edition includes a music video clip of Fixer: While the Woman Are Sleeping.

== Promotion ==
=== Singles ===
It consists of two previously released singles.

Rojo Tierra is the forty ninth single. It was released on 25 January 2015 under Universal Music Japan. It was her first single to be released in 5 years. Before release, Nakamori performed it on 65th NHK Kōhaku Uta Gassen from recording studio in United States in early morning. It was also Nakamori's Kōhaku appearance for first time in 12 years. The single debuted at number 8 on Oricon Single Weekly Charts.

Unfixable is the fiftieth single. It was released on 30 September 2015 under Universal Music Japan. It was her second single to be released in that year. The single debuted at number 20 on Oricon Single Weekly Charts.

In 2016, the album track "Fixer (While the Women Are Sleeping)" was released as a single. The single version was used as a theme song to the film While the Women Are Sleeping.

== Chart performance ==
The album reached number 7 on the Oricon Album Weekly Chart with the sales of 14,000 copies.

== Track listing ==
No.	Title	Lyrics	Music	Arrangement	Length
1.	"Fixer (While the Women Are Sleeping)"	Miran:Miran; Dream Productions; Brian Lee	Miran:Miran; Dream Productions; Lee	Miran:Miran; Dream Productions; Lee	3:04
2.	"Rojo (Tierra)"	Minako Kawae; Miran:Miran	Daisuke Asakura	Asakura; Yūji Toriyama	6:00
3.	"Endless Life"	Yukino Nakajima	koshin	koshin	4:30
4.	"Unfixable"	Hilde Wahl; Anita Lipsky; Tommy Berre; Marietta Constantinou	Wahl; Lipsky; Berre; Constantinou	Wahl; Lipsky; Berre; Constantinou	3:17
5.	"La Vida"	izumi	koshin	koshin; Jin Oki	4:38
6.	"Amatsuki" ((雨月; "Rainy Moon"))	Yutaka Shinya	Shinya	Shinya	4:11
7.	"Todoketai: Voice" ((とどけたい 〜voice〜; "I Want to Reach You ~Voice~"))	Risa Nakamura	Her0ism; SHIROSE from WHITE JAM	Daisuke Kahara	5:18
8.	"Yokudō" ((欲動; "Drive"))	Keiya Mizuki	Jeff Miyahara; Kuraaki Hori	Miyahara; Hori	3:23
9.	"Kodou"	Nakajima	Kōhei Mumemoto	Mumemoto	4:00
10.	"Lotus"	Shinya	Shinya	Shinya	4:28
11.	"Re-birth"	Kawae	Tomohiro Nakachi	Nakachi	4:54
12.	"Rojo -Tierra- (Album Version)"	Kawae; Miran:Miran	Asakura	Asakura; Toriyama	8:15
13.	"Unfixable (Album Version)"	Wahl; Lipsky; Berre; Constantinou	Wahl; Lipsky; Berre; Constantinou	Wahl; Lipsky; Berre; Constantinou	7:00
Total length:					63:20

== Release history ==
Year	Format(s)	Serial number	Label(s)	Ref.
2015	CD, CD+DVD	UPCH-2068, UPCH-7095	UMJ	
2017	UHQCD	UPCH-7287	UMJ	
2023	LP, CD	UPCY-7843, UPJY-9352/3	UMJ	
