= Tokyo Destiny =

Single by Porno Graffitti
- Released: October 16, 2013
- Genre: Pop rock
- Length: 16:06
- Label: SME Records

Porno Graffitti singles chronology
"Seishun Hanamichi" (2013)	"Tokyo Destiny" (2013)	"Oretachi no Celebration" (2014)

Tokyo Destiny (東京デスティニー) is the thirty-ninth single by the Japanese Pop rock band Porno Graffitti. It was released on October 16, 2013.

== Track listing ==
No.	Title	Length
1.	"Tokyo Destiny" (東京デスティニー)	5:01
2.	"Dahlia" (ダリア)	3:30
3.	"Mission of the Far East (instrumental)"	2:34
4.	"Tokyo Destiny (Original karaoke)" (東京デスティニー (オリジナル・カラオケ))	5:01
