= Oretachi no Celebration =

Single by Porno Graffitti
- Released: September 3, 2014
- Genre: Rock
- Length: 12:05
- Label: SME Records

Porno Graffitti singles chronology
"Tokyo Destiny" (2013)	"Oretachi no Celebration" (2014)	"One Woman Show: Amai Maboroshi" (2014)

Oretachi no Celebration (俺たちのセレブレーション) is the fortieth single by the Japanese pop-rock band Porno Graffitti. It was released on September 3, 2014.

== Track listing ==
No.	Title	Length
1.	"Oretachi no Celebration" (俺たちのセレブレーション)	4:16
2.	"365 Days" (365日)	4:11
3.	"Slow the Coin" (スロウ・ザ・コイン)	3:38
