= Unfixable =

Single by Akina Nakamori

from the album Fixer
- B-side: "Ugetsu"
- Released: September 30, 2015
- Recorded: 2015
- Studio: Studio at the Palms
- Genre: J-pop
- Length: 3:20
- Label: Utahime Records; Universal J
- Songwriter(s): Hilde Wahl; Anita Lipsky; Tommy Berre; Marietta Constantinou

Akina Nakamori singles chronology
"Rojo (Tierra)" (2015)	"Unfixable" (2015)	"Fixer (While the Women Are Sleeping)" (2016)

"Unfixable" (アンフィクサブル, Anfikusaburu) is the 50th single by Japanese entertainer Akina Nakamori. Written by Hilde Wahl, Anita Lipsky, Tommy Berre, and Marietta Constantinou, the single was released on September 30, 2015, by Utahime Records and Universal Music Japan in two editions: CD single and the limited edition CD + DVD edition. This was Nakamori's first English-language single. It was also the second single from her 24th studio album Fixer.

== Background ==
"Unfixable" was recorded at the Studio at the Palms in Paradise, Nevada. Aside from being Nakamori's first English-language single, it marks the first time she recorded an English-language song since her 1987 album Cross My Palm.

== Chart performance ==
"Unfixable" peaked at No. 20 on Oricon's weekly singles chart and sold over 8,500 copies.

== Track listing ==
CD
No.	Title	Writer(s)	Length
1.	"Unfixable"	Hilde Wahl; Anita Lipsky; Tommy Berre; Marietta Constantinou	3:20
2.	"Ugetsu" ((雨月, "Rainy Moon"))	Yutaka Shinya	4:11
3.	"Unfixable" (Instrumental)		3:20
4.	"Ugetsu" (Instrumental)		4:11
Total length:			15:02

Limited Edition DVD
No.	Title	Length
1.	"Unfixable" (Image Video)

== Charts ==
Chart (2015)	Peak position
Japan (Oricon)	20
Japan (Billboard Hot 100)	50
Japan (Billboard Top Singles Sales)	18
