= Hitori no Yoru =

2000 single by Porno Graffitti

Single by Porno Graffitti
- Released: January 26, 2000; March 29, 2006 (Re-edition)
- Genre: J-rock
- Length: 12:05
- Label: SME Records

Porno Graffitti singles chronology
"Apollo" (1999)	"Hitori no Yoru" (2000)	"'Music Hour'" (2000)

Hitori no Yoru (ヒトリノ夜) (English: Lonely night) is a song by Japanese rock band Porno Graffitti. It was released on January 26, 2000 as the band's second single, and reached number 12 on the Oricon singles chart. The song was used as the second opening theme of the anime Great Teacher Onizuka.

== Track listing ==
No.	Title	Length
1.	"Hitori no Yoru" (ヒトリノ夜)	4:07
2.	"Dilemma" (ジレンマ)	3:52
3.	"Hitori no Yoru (Instrumental)" (ヒトリノ夜 (Backover))	4:06
