= The Seven Deadly Sins: Dragon's Judgement =

Anime TV series

- Season 4
- First key visual of the season
- No. of episodes: 24

Release
- Original network: TV Tokyo, BS TV Tokyo
- Original release: January 13 – June 23, 2021

Season chronology
- ← Previous; Imperial Wrath of The Gods

The Seven Deadly Sins: Dragon's Judgement (七つの大罪 憤怒の審判, Nanatsu no Taizai: Funnu no Shinpan) is the fourth and final season of The Seven Deadly Sins anime television series, which is based on the manga series of the same name written and illustrated by Nakaba Suzuki. The Japanese subtitle is originally translated as Anger's Judgement, but the official English title is Dragon's Judgement. It was slated to premiere in October 2020 on TV Tokyo and BS TV Tokyo, with the main staff and cast members reprising their roles from the previous season. However, it was delayed to January 2021 due to the COVID-19 pandemic. The series aired from January 13 to June 23, 2021. Netflix globally released the first twelve episodes on June 28, 2021. Episodes 13–24 were later released globally on September 23, 2021. From episodes 77 to 88, the first opening theme is "Hikari Are" (光あれ; lit. "Let There Be Light") performed by Akihito Okano, while the ending theme is "time" performed by SawanoHiroyuki[nZk]:ReoNa. From episodes 89 to 100, the second opening theme is "Eien no Aria" (永遠のAria; lit. "Eternal Aria") performed by Sora Amamiya, while the ending theme is "Namely" performed by Uverworld.

== Episodes ==
Story	Episode	Title (Note: English translated titles are taken from Netflix.)	Directed by	Written by	Storyboarded by	Original release date
77	1	"From Purgatory"; Transliteration: "Rengoku Yori" (Japanese: 煉獄より)	Yukio Nishimoto	Rintarou Ikeda	Yukio Nishimoto	January 13, 2021
As King, Gowther, Hawk, Tarmiel, Sariel, and Derieri make their way to Heaven's Theater to save Elizabeth from an increasingly unstable Estarossa, Merlin, Escanor, Ludociel, Gilthunder and Hendrickson find their way to Meliodias, only to be blocked by Zeldris as Cusack and Chandler assume their demon forms in recognition of their strong opponents. During the fight, Hendrickson protects Ludociel from an attack due to the archangel still residing in Margaret's body. Meanwhile, in Purgatory, a weary Ban struggles to keep himself from fully turning into a lost soul and ends up in a years-long struggle with a dragon spirit, eventually realizing it is Meliodas' emotions.
78	2	"A Meeting with the Unknown"; Transliteration: "Michi to no Sōgū" (Japanese: 未知との遭遇)	Akira Mano	Rintarou Ikeda	Rie Nishino	January 20, 2021
Ban is reunited with the physical embodiment of Meliodas' emotions, who explains that he lost hope of finding a way out of Purgatory ages ago. While annoyed that Ban has no escape path planned out, Meliodas is glad to see him as the two proceed to make clothing from one of the native creatures that adapted to the extreme conditions of the dimension. The duo soon realize the Demon King is likely where the exit is and decide to search for him, gaining an ally in a boar named Wild who was observing them. Wild provides the two with shelter in his den when a hot sandstorm rolls in, revealing himself as the older brother of Hawk whom the Demon King stole away when he was newly born. Meliodas sees the reason as the Demon King needed an animal companion that would not die easily to directly watch Meliodas, with him and Ban telling Wild about Hawk. At Camelot, the Assault Force commence their battle with the demons before Zeldris decides to release his original power, remembering Meliodas's promise to him of releasing his beloved Gelda.
79	3	"A Single-Minded Love"; Transliteration: "Ichizu Naru Omoi" (Japanese: 一途なる想い)	Hideki Tonokatsu	Rintarou Ikeda	Susumu Nishizawa	January 27, 2021
In Purgatory, Meliodas brings Zeldris' tragic past to light as he, Ban, and Wild make their way towards the Demon King. He explains that the vampire race, vassals of the Demons, attempted a coup when the Holy War started, and the Demon King ordered Zeldris to execute them along with his beloved Gelda. In Camelot, having learned that Gelda is still alive after the freed vampires were killed by the Seven Deadly Sins and resolving to give the Commandments to his brother, Zeldris reveals his true power: Ominous Nebula. The Assault Force are overwhelmed as Merlin deduces the nature of Ominous Nebula, also known as Full React, and how it and the Demon King's magic make Zeldris a difficult opponent. Even after Zeldris increases the attack's pull, with Gilthunder wounded in protecting Margaret's body from the demon's attack, Escanor is unaffected as he assumes his The One state to turn the tide in his group's favor.
80	4	"The Victims of the Holy War"; Transliteration: "Seisen no Giseisha" (Japanese: 聖戦の犠牲者)	Hidehiko Kadota	Rintarou Ikeda	Sarin Kageyama	February 3, 2021
Though Escanor manages to overpower Zeldris, Chandler recognizes his power that of Archangel Mael and uses his Darkness magic to darken the sky, forcing Escanor to his usual form. Chandler and Cusack prepare to attack when the effects of the Double Impact that Merlin used on them take effect to hinder them indefinitely. Though a wounded Zeldris breaks Merlin's enchantments, Ludociel defeats him and declares victory for the Goddess race and the joy of finally avenging Mael. In Purgatory, Meliodas realizes that he cannot remember anything about Estarossa when asked about him as the Demon King reveals himself. The Demon King reveals he also can't remember anything about Estarossa and deduces it as a fabrication that only the Commandant Gowther could do. At the sky-high Heaven's Theater, King, Tarmiel, Sariel, and Derieri battle Estarossa while Gowther quietly observes. Within Estarossa's black mass, Elizabeth has a realization that breaks the Commandant Gowther's spell and affecting everyone under it as Estarossa is revealed to actually be Mael.
81	5	"The Tragic Strike"; Transliteration: "Kanashiki Ichigeki" (Japanese: 悲しき一撃)	Yoshinari Suzuki, Yoshito Hata	Rintarou Ikeda	Aokiho	February 10, 2021
Gowther reveals to a confused Mael that his creator used a forbidden spell to end the Holy War 3,000 years ago by altering the memories of Mael and those who knew him. While Gowther offered his life as penitence for his role in the spell, a vengeful Mael decides to kill his friends instead. As King struggles against Mael, Sariel convinces Tarmiel that they need to fight against Mael as the Commandments he possesses are corrupting him. Derieri, explaining to Elizabeth that her desire to live for Monspeet spurred her role in the Holy War, risks her life in her plan to extract the commandments from Mael. However, Tarmiel stops his attack, and Mael exploits this to destroy Derieri's last remaining heart and take her Commandment after wounding Sariel.
82	6	"Confront Despair!!"; Transliteration: "Zetsubō ni Tachimukae" (Japanese: 絶望に立ち向かえ)	Akira Mano	Yoshiki Ōkusa	Hideki Tonokatsu	February 17, 2021
With four Commandments, Mael enters into a cocoon of light to fuse with the Commandments, emitting beams of dark light that vaporize Sariel and Tarmiel. Gowther then decides that he will fight Mael alone so he would not lose any more friends. Gowther takes on Mael alone to protect his friends while Elizabeth heals King's injuries, joined by Diane as Mael emerges in a new form as he uses the four Commandments to overwhelm the group, with Oslo sacrificing himself to protect the others. Diane uses Gideon's special ability Lightning Rod, absorbing the electrical magic from Mael's attacks, which causes Heaven's Theater to break apart. The tables are turned when King's wings fully grow, allowing him to rejoin the fight in his fully powered form as the Fairy King, hearing the chaotic thoughts in Mael's heart while overwhelming the corrupted Archangel with simultaneous True Spirit Spear configurations.
83	7	"Hope, Conflict, and Despair"; Transliteration: "Kibō to Kattō to Zetsubō" (Japanese: 希望と葛藤と絶望)	Dali Chen	Yurika Miyao	Dali Chen	February 24, 2021
After the fight, King spares Mael's life as he has no intent to continue the cycle of revenge. The Commandments begin destroying Mael's body as Gowther uses Invasion to enter his mind and save him, revealing that his creator picked Mael because he murdered his lover Glariza, whom Gowther's appearance is based on. The revelation spurs Mael to purge the Commandments from his body and save Gowther. Meanwhile, in Camelot, Ludociel is writhing in agony from the lingering effects of the memory spell's cancellation, while Zeldris is unaffected as he never considered Estarossa his brother. Chandler and Cusack then tell Zeldris to stand back as they reveal their true nature as two halves of the Demon King's right hand who was sundered for an attempted rebellion, the two each giving sincere thoughts to their wards before merging back into their original self.
84	8	"The Doorway to Hope"; Transliteration: "Kibō e no Tobira" (Japanese: 希望への扉)	Hidehiko Kadota	Rintarou Ikeda	Bob Shirahata	March 3, 2021
The trio battle the Demon King and are immediately overwhelmed, Meliodas revealing the Demon King's magical power Ruler renders their attacks useless against him. Sixty years (six hours in Britannia) have passed in Purgatory as Meliodas, Ban, and Wild have suffered repeatedly failed attempts to defeat the Demon King. Luckily, during these decades of fighting losing battles against him, Ban learns a new healing technique by reversing the effects of his Snatch ability. This inspires Meliodas to have Ban use his new Gift technique on the Demon King to weaken him, revealing his The Ruler ability inverts the effect of any magical ability used on him. The Demon King, having grown bored of them prior, commends them for figuring out his secret yet refuses to let them escape through the portal to the living world as he deactivates his Ruler ability for Ban's new technique to heal himself. Meliodas rescues Ban and holds his father off, the Demon King explaining that Meliodas's body has become a worthy heir without his emotions hindering him. The Demon King is about to finish Meliodas off when Wild intervenes by using his life-exhausting Wild Full Throttle, knocking Meliodas and Ban through the portal while lamenting not being able to see Hawk. Parting ways with Ban while fending off his father, Meliodas awakens a new power while returning to his body. Upon returning to the living world, Ban tells Elizabeth and the others to reach Camelot while he travels to where Elaine is helping the Holy Knights as she has reached her limit. Ban arrives in time and saves her, using Gift to fully resurrect Elaine at the cost of his immortality.
85	9	"That Which Gathers"; Transliteration: "Shūketsu Suru Mono-tachi" (Japanese: 集結するものたち)	Yukio Nishimoto	Yoshiki Ōkusa	Yukio Nishimoto	March 10, 2021
Chandler and Cusack merge back into the all-powerful Original Demon, whose restoration dispels Meliodas's barrier. The Original Demon overpowers Escanor despite Merlin's aid while barely dodging Chastiefol, which King can now control from afar as he has it battle Zeldris. Inside the castle, a desperate Ludociel asks Hendrickson to take him to Mael, with Hendrickson taking advantage of the Archangel's mental state to use Purge to expel Ludociel from Margaret's body. Hendrickson tells Margaret to take Gilthunder to safety as he remains behind, offering a furious Ludociel his body to atone for his past actions. The other Sins are near Camelot when they sense the four Commandments Mael have expelled reaching the city ahead of them, calling Melascula's Commandment to them as they all fuse into Meliodas' cocoon. Merlin realizes their only chance of saving Meliodas at this point by casting Chrono Coffin on the cocoon to temporally stop the process, Ludociel seeing it futile as the Original Demon sends Escanor flying off into the distance before aiding Zeldris in overpowering Chastiefol. Hendrickson manages to snap Ludociel out of his depression to join the fight, the Archangel healing him rather than possess his body before intercepting the Original Demon.
86	10	"The Salvation of the Sun"; Transliteration: "Taiyō no Kyūsai" (Japanese: 太陽の救済)	Kazuya Fujishiro	Yoshiki Ōkusa	Koichi Ohata	March 17, 2021
Escanor is knocked off into the distance by the Original Demon's Death Drive, saved by Mael mid-air as he, Elizabeth and the other Sins approach Camelot at full speed. Escanor realizes his body is no longer able to withstand Sunshine's power and offers it back to Mael in order to protect the ones he cares about. Mael gradually accepts and reaches Camelot where he reunites with Ludociel, offering Zeldris a chance to retreat and not interfere in the Sins saving Meliodas while defeating the Original Demon. Zeldris refuses to back down as the other Sins arrive to Merlin's side, aiding Mael in holding Zeldris off for at least five minutes for Merlin to complete Chrono Coffin. While the spell is successfully cast, Hawk notices a hole in the cocoon as everyone feels a massively dark power in the air. Elizabeth senses the source of the aura behind her: an adult version of Meliodas.
87	11	"The One Who Stands Against a God"; Transliteration: "Kami to Taiji Suru Hito" (Japanese: 神と対峙する人)	Akihiro Nagao	Yurika Miyao	Sarin Kageyama	March 24, 2021
Elizabeth realizes the figure from the cocoon standing before them is not Meliodas as he reveals himself to be the Demon King possessing Meliodas's body, revealing the "succession" with the Commandants is actually a means to acquire a younger body for his soul to inhabit. The Sins confront the Demon King as he offers to break Elizabeth's curse, only so he can brutally kill her and see how Meliodas would react. King, Diane, and Mael engage the Demon King while Merlin places everyone else in Perfect Cubes, only to be overpowered as the Demon King attacks Hawk for provoking him. Ban arrives in time to save Hawk, intending to force the Demon King out of Meliodas's body. Despite losing his immortality, Ban's time in Purgatory has made him stronger and more resilient. He proceeds to overpower the Demon King as Meliodas confronts his father in the spiritual world, with the Demon King fighting the two on both fronts before managing to regain control by tricking his son into believing he killed Elizabeth. Ban begins losing the battle, with the others unable to reach Meliodas before Gowther tells everyone that he has a plan, the group entering the spirit realm to aid Meliodas.
88	12	"We'll All Be Your Strength"; Transliteration: "Minna ga Kimi no Chikara ni Naru" (Japanese: みんながキミの力になる)	Mayu Numayama	Yurika Miyao	Seiki Taichu	March 31, 2021
Elizabeth and the others make their way into the spirit world as Meliodas is losing consciousness, inspiring him to fight back. The Demon King attempts to destroy them when Meliodas repels his attacks and inflicts damage with small dark spheres. Meliodas states that since his friends' existence and emotions have given him strength, the Demon King has lost any chance of defeating him. Mael and Ludociel aid Ban in keeping the Demon King from attacking Elizabeth and the others in the physical world as they are joined by Zeldris, who wants the Demon King to not interfere in his deal with Meliodas. The Demon King admits that he knew of Zeldris's feelings for Gelda before sending him to dispatch the vampires and kept him around because of his loyalty, revoking the power he lent his son to inflict a mortal injury. Back in the spirit world as King recognizes his captain's new Trillion Dark attack as the product of their training in Istar, Meliodas sees his friends off before defeating his father, while the others combine their attacks to force the Demon King from Meliodas's body.
89	13	"The End of a Long Journey"; Transliteration: "Nagaki Tabi no Shūchaku" (Japanese: 永き旅の終着)	Yoshito Hata	Yoshiki Ōkusa	Aokiho	April 7, 2021
Despite the Seven Deadly Sins' victory against the Demon King, with the lesser demons retreating, Ludociel is unable to maintain his physical form and fades away while Elizabeth thanks him and wishes him to find peace. Furthermore, the Sins dread that there is now no way to end Elizabeth's curse with the Commandments gone. However, Meliodas reveals he have acquired the power to finally end their curses. Following Meliodas honoring his promise to Zeldris to release Gelda from her seal in Edinburgh, the group return to Liones to celebrate with their allies. Ban sees though Meliodas's façade as they head onto the balcony and enjoy the stars after being stuck in Purgatory for 1,000 years, realizing Meliodas' awakening as a demon king will cause a massive uproar in nature, meaning that he cannot remain in Britannia.
90	14	"Farewell, Seven Deadly Sins"; Transliteration: "Sayonara〈Nanatsu no Taizai〉" (Japanese: さよなら〈七つの大罪〉)	Hidehiko Kadota	Yurika Miyao	Bob Shirahata	April 14, 2021
A series of strange weather events occur as Ban explains to Elaine that the world is trying to reject Meliodas due to the threat his power poses on its balance, having not told the others despite knowing they are beginning to suspect. The next day, the group heads out to gather supplies for the Boar Hat where the others finally speak about Meliodas leaving for the Demon World. Later, Elizabeth turns down Bartra's request to succeed him so she can leave with Meliodas for the Demon Realm, to everyone's amazement. But on the day Meliodas and Elizabeth are to leave, a large rock collapses and seemingly crushes the latter.
91	15	"Fated Brothers"; Transliteration: "Shukumei no Kyōdai" (Japanese: 宿命の兄弟)	Dali Chen	Rintarou Ikeda	Dali Chen	April 21, 2021
Merlin saves Elizabeth as Meliodas finds himself unable to dispel her curse, realizing that the Demon King is still alive as he and Elizabeth feign how it is possible since the Commandments are unable to possess any other being without destroying them. It was revealed that days prior, following the Original Demon's separation by Mael, Cusack killed Chandler before escaping with the wounded Zeldris and the Commandments. Cusack proceeds to fuse the Commandments inside Zeldris' body to make him the new Demon King, only be killed when the Demon King acquired his new body and summons an Indura to prevent the Sins from stopping him as he regains his full power at Lake Salisbury. As Gowther, Ban, King and Diane battle the Indura while Escanor and Hawk alert Liones, Meliodas and Elizabeth head off on their own to save Zeldris as he is tricked by the Demon King into believing that the Sins killed Gelda.
92	16	"The Final Battle"; Transliteration: "Saishū Sensō" (Japanese: 最終戦争)	Hideki Tonokatsu	Rintarou Ikeda	Hideki Tonokatsu	April 28, 2021
As Meliodas and Elizabeth fight the Demon King, the other Sins fight the Indura while Merlin gives Ban his Sacred Treasure Courechouse to dispatch the creature's spawn. Only one escapes and appears in Liones as Escanor, despite no longer having his power, nearly gets himself killed protecting the Holy Knights when Mael finally answers his pleas and intervenes. Escanor then convinces Mael into bestowing Sunshine on him again, knowing it will kill him as he intends to risk his life to save his friends. Meanwhile, the Demon King's hold over Zeldris' body becomes stronger as he assumes a new form while the other Sins arrive to back up Meliodas.
93	17	"The Voice Calling Your Name"; Transliteration: "Kimi no Na o Yobu Koe" (Japanese: キミの名を呼ぶ声)	Sumito Sasaki	Rintarou Ikeda	Yukihiro Matsushita	May 5, 2021
Diane uses her power to separate the Demon King from Salisbury so he would not siphon its power. With Escanor joining the fray, Meliodas and Gowther use the latter's ability to enter Zeldris's mind and confirm his earlier suspicions of the Gelda before him being an illusion of the Demon King. The Demon King creates more illusions, but the real Gelda arrives in the mindscape after ingesting Zeldris's blood with Meliodas entrusting his younger brother to deal with his battle while returning to the physical world as high noon hits.
94	18	"The King Sings Alone"; Transliteration: "Ō wa Kodoku ni Utau" (Japanese: 王は孤独に歌う)	Akira Mano	Yurika Miyao	Yukio Nishimoto	May 12, 2021
Escanor assumes his The One state as he and the Demon King trade blows, but Escanor's power does not diminish after a minute has passed as Meliodas realizes Escanor is converting his own life force to maintain his state. Spurred by the memories of when he first joined the Sins, Escanor is bent on laying down his life in his The One: Ultimate form before the other Sins intervene and convince him to let them also lay down their lives for him and each other.
95	19	"The Struggle"; Transliteration: "Agaki" (Japanese: あがき)	Masahiro Takada	Yoshiki Ōkusa	Seiki Taichu	May 19, 2021
Escanor uses The One: Ultimate to continue fighting the Demon King and gradually accepts the other Sins' help as they commence a joint attack on the Demon King. At the same time, Zeldris manages to regain control of his body and expunges the Commandments with Ban keeping them from possessing him. But the purged Commandments infuse themselves into the surrounding area to create a vessel for the Demon King from Britannia itself. Despite this threat, the Sins are undeterred and prepare to take down the Demon King once and for all.
96	20	"Mortal Enemies"; Transliteration: "Tomo ni Ten o Itadakazu" (Japanese: 倶に天を戴かず)	Hideki Tonokatsu	Rintarou Ikeda	Hideki Tonokatsu	May 26, 2021
The Seven Deadly Sins charge at the Demon King, briefly immobilized before Merlin removes their limits as Gowther negates the Demon King's The Ruler. The Sins launch a group attack with Meliodas amplifying it with Full Counter to directly kill the Demon King without damaging Britannia. In his final moments, the Demon King appears within Meliodas's mind to warn him that he will regret killing him as he must be aware of what he incited by ending the cycle of light and darkness. After explaining to Zeldris that he used the waters of Lake Salisbury to absorb the attack's excess power, Meliodas is alerted by Diane that the Commandments are still intact. Merlin explains that, as long as the Commandments continue to exist, the Demon King can be revived within decades or centuries, so Meliodas destroys the Commandments, sacrificing his demon king powers to Zeldris's amazement. Turning down Meliodas's offer to join the Sins for a celebratory drink despite their brotherly bond restored, Zeldris departs with Gelda. However, the group's victory becomes bittersweet when Escanor's body begins to burn away. Having no regrets, Escanor giving parting words to each of the Sins and Mael before finally confessing his love to Merlin and assures that would have remained by her side regardless of her intentions. After Merlin receives burns from kissing him so he would never be forgotten, Escanor recites his last words in the form of a poem before passing on.
97	21	"What the Witch Had Always Wanted"; Transliteration: "Majo ga Motome Tsuzuketa Mono" (Japanese: 魔女が求め続けたもの)	Hidehiko Kadota	Rintarou Ikeda	Koichi Ohata	June 2, 2021
While toasting in Escanor's memory while wondering what world would become with the gods no more, Gilthunder, Howzer and Griamore receive a surprise visit from Vivian who announces the end of the balance of light and darkness marks the beginning of the Age of Chaos. Gilthunder revealing that she fell in love with Dreyfus when he had Henrickson save her life when Ludociel wounded her, Vivian explains she heard Merlin speaking of Chaos. As Merlin expresses her intent of keeping her burns from kissing Escanor in his memory, she brings the Sins back to Lake Salisbury where she submerges Arthur's body in its waters, resurrecting him as the King of Chaos before he attacks Meliodas under the impression that he is still in league with the demons. Merlin calms Arthur down when his powers affect the area, explaining of the events that followed occurred after his death and that Arthur has become the vessel of an entity that shaped their world: Chaos. When Meliodas asks for answers, a being within Salisbury known as the Lady of the Lake reveals that Merlin has been hiding her agenda from the others. Raised as a weapon against the Demon and Goddess races, Merlin sought to fill the void in her heart over Meliodas's inability of returning her feelings for him. She eventually learned of Chaos and how it created the Demon King and Supreme Deity along with the other races with Humanity its greatest creation before being sealed by the two gods so they can rule the world in a shaky alliance.
98	22	"A Taste of Chaos"; Transliteration: "Konton no Ittan" (Japanese: 混沌の一端)	Yoshito Hata	Yurika Miyao	Bob Shirahata	June 9, 2021
The Lady of the Lake reveals that Merlin manipulated the events of the Holy War to remove the Supreme Deity by enlisting the Giant craftsman Dubs and later assembling the Sins to destroy the Demon King in order to completely disrupt the deities' seal. Diane refuses to accept this before the Lady reveals that Merlin purposely delayed her Chrono Coffin spell on Meliodas' cocoon and then briefly reactivated Elizabeth's curse to force the events leading to the Demon King's death. Furious over the revelation, Meliodas reproaches Merlin for using them to revive a mythological being before the Lady reveals that Chaos does exist and had resided within the moss construct known as Hawk's Mom. The Chaos power had left its vessel and now resides within Arthur. Cath emerges from the Boar Hat and suddenly attacks Arthur, eating his arm before transforming into a monster. The Lady reveals Cath's true identity as Cath Palug, an embodiment of Chaos's destructive nature who only protected Arthur so he would eat the human once he became the Chaos King in order to take the power for his own. Cath attempts to eat Arthur, only to be seemingly destroyed after the human manifests Excalibur upon accepting the beast as his enemy. Merlin proceeds to tend to Arthur's injuries after teleporting the other Sins and Elizabeth back to Liones. While the group discuss the revelation and their comrade's motives, Merlin resolves to protect Arthur as Cath returns in his true form.
99	23	"An Everlasting Kingdom"; Transliteration: "Eien no Ōkoku" (Japanese: 永遠の王国)	Fumio Maezono	Yoshiki Ōkusa	Hideki Tonokatsu	June 16, 2021
Arthur acts against Merlin's wishes to help her fight Cath, who proceeds to break him by revealing that Camelot's destruction. The other Sins arrive in time to save Arthur, Meliodas informing Merlin she needs to take responsibility for Arthur while he and the others will take on the task of protecting them. But the group learns Cath is being beyond life and death who intends to use Chaos to destroy everything, the beast placing them in desired futures with the battle hopeless until Arthur resolves that eating Cath is the only way to defeat him. Arthur manifests a mouth-like wormhole for Chaos to drag Cath, who initially struggles while attempting to break Arthur's spirit before submitting to his fate upon hearing the youth's intent to rebuild Camelot as an "everlasting kingdom" where nobody suffers. With the world restored and Arthur regaining the fragment Cath took, Meliodas and the other Sins offer their support to Arthur. Note: The film The Seven Deadly Sins: Cursed by Light takes place after this episode where the characters face off against Dahlia, Dubs, and the Supreme Deity.
100	24	"Heirs"; Transliteration: "Tsugare Yuku Mono" (Japanese: 継がれゆくもの)	Kanji Wakabayashi	Rintarou Ikeda	Yukihiro Matsushita	June 23, 2021
With the threat of the Demon King and Cath over, an era of peace finally begins in Britannia as Merlin remains with Arthur to help him rebuild Camelot while helping Hawk return to Purgatory, where he is reunited with Wild. The other Sins depart to Liones before going their separate ways: Diane and King planning their wedding in the Fairy King's Forest while Gowther, Ban and Elaine set off on their respective journeys. Meliodas and Elizabeth also embark to see the places where latter lived in her past lives before accepting Bartra's proposal to succeed him in ruling Liones. In the year that followed, the Holy Knights resumed their duties as protectors of Britannia while some of their members resign. A decade later, the Sins have a reunion during the birthday of Meliodas and Elizabeth's son Tristan, who was sold by the rumors about the Sins being villains before Gowther shows him their whole story. The following day, while sparring with his father, Tristan expresses his resolve to become a Holy Knight like the Seven Deadly Sins.

== Recap special ==
Story	Episode	Title	Original release date
76.5	0	"Great Charming Emission Special"; Transliteration: "Miryoku Dai Hōshutsu Supesharu" (Japanese: 魅力大放出スペシャル)	January 6, 2021
A recap special focusing on key story moments from all the previous seasons of the series leading up to Dragon's Judgement.

== Home media release ==
=== Japanese ===
VAP (Japan – Region 2/A)
Box	Discs	Episodes	Release date	Ref.
I	3 + 1 bonus CD	1–12	September 15, 2021	
II	3 + 1 bonus DVD	13–24	November 17, 2021	
