= Rojo (Tierra) =

Single by Akina Nakamori

from the album Fixer
- Language: Japanese
- B-side: "La Vida"
- Released: January 21, 2015
- Recorded: 2014
- Genre: J-pop; EDM
- Length: 6:00
- Label: Utahime Records; Universal J
- Composer: Daisuke Asakura
- Lyricists: Minako Kawae; Miran:Miran
- Producers: Daisuke Asakura; Yūji Toriyama

Akina Nakamori singles chronology
"Crazy Love" (2010)	"Rojo (Tierra)" (2015)	"Unfixable" (2015)

Music videos
- "Rojo (Tierra)" (Teaser) on YouTube

"Rojo (Tierra)" (ロホ・ティエラ, Roho Tiera) is the 49th single by Japanese entertainer Akina Nakamori. Written by Minako Kawae, Nakamori (under the pseudonym "Miran:Miran"), and Daisuke Asakura, the single was released on January 21, 2015, by Utahime Records and Universal Music Japan in two editions: CD single and the limited edition CD + DVD edition. It was also the lead single from her 24th studio album Fixer.

== Background ==
"Rojo (Tierra)" is Spanish for "Red (Earth)". It was Nakamori's first physical single in over five years, after her 2009 release "Diva Single Version". Due to Nakamori's intention to deliver the new song to fans as soon as possible, the teaser ringtone was distributed on December 24, 2014 as a Christmas present. The full single was first made available online on December 31. Nakamori debuted the song on the 65th Kōhaku Uta Gassen via satellite from a recording studio in Los Angeles.

== Chart performance ==
"Rojo (Tierra)" peaked at No. 8 on Oricon's weekly singles chart and sold over 25,400 copies, becoming Nakamori's first top-10 since "Gekka" in 1994.

== Track listing ==
CD
No.	Title	Lyrics	Music	Arrangement	Length
1.	"Rojo (Tierra)"	Minako Kawae; Miran:Miran	Daisuke Asakura	Asakura; Yūji Toriyama	6:00
2.	"La Vida"	Izumi	Koshin	Koshin; Jin Oki	4:38
3.	"Rojo (Tierra)" (Instrumental)				6:00
4.	"La Vida" (Instrumental)				4:38
Total length:					20:16

Limited Edition DVD
No.	Title	Length
1.	"Rojo (Tierra)" (Making-of Video)

== Personnel ==
"Rojo (Tierra)"

- Daisuke Asakura – digital programming
- Yūji Toriyama – guitar
- Masato Kawase – bass
- Toshiya Matsunaga – percussion
- Tadashi Satō – percussion

"La Vida"

- Jin Oki – flamenco guitar, palmas
- Takamitsu Ishizuka – palmas
- Jose Colón – palmas

== Charts ==
Chart (2015)	Peak position
Japan (Oricon)	8
Japan (Billboard Hot 100)	11
Japan (Billboard Top Singles Sales)	8
