= Ai ga Yobu Hō e =

Single by Porno Graffitti
- Released: November 6, 2003
- Genre: Rock
- Length: 13:12
- Label: SME Records

Porno Graffitti singles chronology
"'Melissa'" (2003)	"Ai ga Yobu Hō e" (2003)	"'Lack'" (2003)

Ai ga Yobu Hō e (愛が呼ぶほうへ) (English: Toward Love Calls) is the thirteenth single by the Japanese Pop-rock band Porno Graffitti. It was released on November 6, 2003. The title song was appointed to the theme song of the TBS drama "Suekko Chonan Ane Sannin (末っ子長男姉三人)".

== Track listing ==
No.	Title	Length
1.	"Ai ga Yobu Hō e" (愛が呼ぶほうへ)	4:18
2.	"Yūhi to Hoshizora to Boku" (夕陽と星空と僕)	4:35
3.	"Hard Days, Holy Night"	4:19
