= Haruichi Shindō =

Haruichi Shindō 新藤 晴一
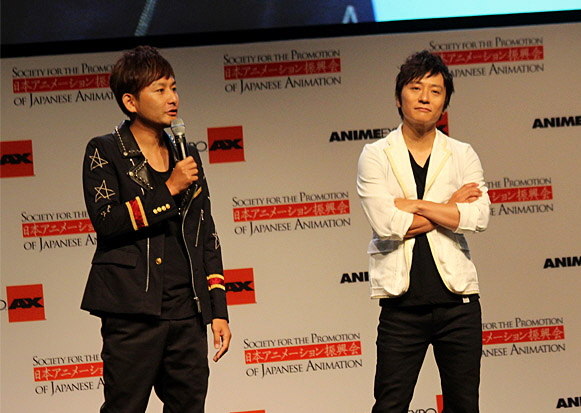
- Haruichi on the left

Background information
- Also known as: Haruichi (晴一, ハルイチ)
- Born: 20 September 1974 (age 52); Innoshima, Hiroshima, Japan
- Genres: J-pop; rock
- Occupations: Musician; lyricist; composer; record producer; author
- Instrument: Guitar
- Years active: 1994–present
- Label: SME Records
- Website: haru☆jp (in Japanese)

Haruichi Shindō (新藤 晴一, Shindō Haruichi; born 20 September 1974) is a Japanese musician, lyricist, composer, record producer and author who is affiliated with Amuse, Inc. His artist name at his debut was Haruichi (ハルイチ), and he formed a band named No Score with his classmates at high school which later became Porno Graffitti. Originally he was the lead vocalist, but since Akihito Okano joined, he became the lead guitarist and provided backing vocals. He is also a guitarist for THE Yatou.

== Personal life ==
Shindō was married to actress Kyōko Hasegawa from 2008 to 2021. They have two children together, a son born in 2009 and a daughter born in 2012.

== Writing credits ==
| Artist | Song | Notes |
|---|---|---|
| Color | Rav & Business | |
| Color | Remake | "Tsubasa ga nakute mo" coupling |
| Buzy | Kujira | |
| Buzy | Venus Say... | Kujira coupling, Twin Spica opening song |
| Buzy | Hitori ichizu | |
| Buzy | Be Somewhere | |
| Buzy | Pasion | |
| Buzy | Nakitai Yoru ni Kikitaikotoba | Pasion coupling |
| Michihiro Kuroda | la la | Album in depth included |
| Hemenway | Gensō to Dance | |
| Hemenway | Hanbun Ningen | |
| Hiromi Ōta | Kimi ga itta honto no Koto | Album Hajimari wa "ma-gokoro" datta. included |
| Naohito Fujiki | Tuning Note | NTV drama Harikei theme song |
| Skoop On Somebody | Q | TBS Ai no Gekijō Onsen e Go! theme song |
| Rein Yoshii | Faded | |
| Rein Yoshii | Just One | |
| Rein Yoshii | Ammonite | |
| Rein Yoshii | Pill Case | |
| Rein Yoshii | Logic | |
| Rein Yoshii | Arashi | |
| Akina Nakamori | Hirari (Sakura)" | "Fixer (While the Women Are Sleeping)" coupling |
| Kanjani Eight | Otoseyo | Dorobo Yakusha main theme song |
| Megumi Nakajima | Submarine | Album Curiosity included |
| Megumi Nakajima | Suisou | TBS Stars Align opening song |
| Reon Yuzuki | Alert feat. NAOTO | Mini Album R ing included |
| Team SHACHI | Rocket Queen feat. MCU | |
| Maaya Sakamoto | Loop | Tsubasa: Reservoir Chronicle ending song. Under pen name h's |
| Maaya Sakamoto | My Favorite Books | Under pen name h's |
| Mayday | Buzzin' | Japanese version of Party Animal |
| Tsunomaki Watame | Fins | |

== Filmography ==
=== Radio ===
Regular

| Dates | Title | Network | Notes |
|---|---|---|---|
| 7 April 2003 – | Cafe in 11 | Bay FM | Mondays, 23:00 – 23:52 |

=== Television ===
Regular

| Dates | Title | Network | Notes |
|---|---|---|---|
| 3 April 2018 – | Porno Graffitti Shindou Haruichi no "Haruichi No Oto" | Hiroshima Television | Tuesday, twice a month on the first Tuesday and the third Tuesday |

Special occasion

| Dates | Title | Network | Notes |
|---|---|---|---|
| 29 June 2019 – | Asano shi Hiroshima shiro nyūjō 400 nenkinen bangumi-chi o hiraki bunka ni hana o Hiroshima o osameta Asano-shi no ashiato | Hiroshima Television | as MC |

=== Films ===
| Title | Role |
|---|---|
| Road 88: Deai-ji, Shikoku e | Bessho |

== Bibliography ==
=== Monographs ===
- Jitaku nite Sony Magazines – taking a column serialised in the music magazine Pati Pati (released 24 December 2005 ISBN 4-7897-2658-4)

=== Serialisations ===
- "Jitaku nite" – serialised in the music magazine Pati Pati (February 2001 issue – April 2005 issue, 51 times in total)
- "haru.cam" – posted pictures and comments for himself at the music magazine B.Pass (May 2006 issue – already finished)
- "Hiroshima Carp Fan mo Umi o Wataru" – he was writing a column about baseball at the Major League information magazine Slugger (May 2006 issue – serialising)
- "Otoko no Kōkan Nikki" – posted alternately with Akihito at the female fashion magazine "an an" (20 June 2006 – June 2007)
- "Tokinoo" – Novel. Serialized in the magazine papyrus (February 2008 issue – April 2009)

=== Novels ===
- Toki no O Gentosha – book of the novel "Tokinoo" (released 15 May 2010 ISBN 978-4-344-01821-1)
- The Rules (released September 2017 ISBN 9784838729258)
