= Anata ga Koko ni Itara =

Single by Porno Graffitti
- Released: February 13, 2008
- Genre: Pop-rock
- Length: 12:22
- Label: SME Records

Porno Graffitti singles chronology
"'Link'" (2007)	"Anata ga Koko ni Itara" (2008)	"'Itai Tachiichi'" (2008)

Anata ga Koko ni Itara (あなたがここにいたら) (English: If you were here) is the twenty-third single by the Japanese Pop-rock band Porno Graffitti. It was released on February 13, 2008.

== Track listing ==
No.	Title	Length
1.	"Anata ga Koki no Itara" (あなたがここにいたら)	4:08
2.	"Hall" (ホール)	4:37
3.	"Onion soup" (オニオンスープ)	3:37
