= Love, too Death,too =

"Love, too Death, too"

Single by Porno Graffitti
- Released: October 8, 2008
- Genre: Pop-rock
- Length: 13:27
- Label: SME Records

Porno Graffitti singles chronology
"'Gift'" (2008)	"Love, too Death, too" (2008)	"'Koyoi, Tsuki ga Miezutomo'" (2008)

Love, too Death, too is the twenty-sixth single by the Japanese Pop-rock band Porno Graffitti It was released on October 8, 2008.

It was the Billboard number one single in Japan on October 20, 2008.

== Track listing ==
No.	Title	Length
1.	"Love, too Death, too"	4:53
2.	"Good news" (グッドニュース)	4:48
3.	"Time or Distance"	3:46
