= Rhinoceros (Porno Graffitti album) =

Studio album by Porno Graffitti
- Released: August 19, 2015
- Genre: Rock
- Length: 54:39
- Label: SME Records
- Producer: Porno Graffitti

Porno Graffitti chronology
| Panorama Porno (2012) | Rhinoceros (2015) | Butterfly Effect (2017) |

Rhinoceros ( ポルノグラフィティ) is the tenth studio album by Japanese pop-rock band Porno Graffitti (ポルノグラフィティ.) It was released on August 19, 2015. The album features the song "Oh! Rival," the theme song to the anime "Detective Conan: Sunflowers of Fire," the 19th movie in the Detective Conan franchise.

== Track listing ==
Rhinoceros track listing
| No. | Title | Length |
|---|---|---|
| 1. | "ANGRY BIRD" | 4:00 |
| 2. | "Oh! Rival" (オー!リバル) | 4:55 |
| 3. | "Ohhh!!! HANABI" | 4:35 |
| 4. | "wataridori" | 4:37 |
| 5. | "Hey Mama" | 1:18 |
| 6. | "Oretachi no Celebration" (俺たちのセレブレーション) | 4:18 |
| 7. | "Stand Alone" | 3:58 |
| 8. | "One Woman Show ~Amai Maboroshi~" (ワン・ウーマン・ショー 〜甘い幻〜) | 4:08 |
| 9. | "Social ESCAPE" (ソーシャル ESCAPE) | 4:45 |
| 10. | "Babel no Kaze" (バベルの風) | 3:33 |
| 11. | "AGAIN" | 3:55 |
| 12. | "Good luck to you" | 3:12 |
| 13. | "Rasen" (螺旋) | 2:53 |
| 14. | "Mistero" (ミステーロ) | 4:23 |

DVD
| No. | Title | Length |
|---|---|---|
| 1. | "Our Celebration" (video clip) |
| 2. | "Ohhh!!! HANABI" (video clip) |
| 3. | "One Woman Show ~ Sweet Phantom ~" (video clip) |
| 4. | "Oh! Rival" (video clip) |
