= Kumo o mo Tsukamu Tami =

Studio album by Porno Graffitti
- Released: March 27, 2002
- Recorded: 2001–2002
- Genre: J-pop
- Length: 56:21
- Label: SME Records
- Producer: Porno Graffitti

Porno Graffitti chronology
foo? (2001)	Kumo o mo Tsukamu Tami (2002)	Worldillia (2003)

Singles from Kumo o mo Tsukamu Tami
- 1. "Agehachō" Released: June 27, 2001; 2. "Voice" Released: October 17, 2001; 3. "Shiawase ni tsuite Honki Dashite Kangaete Mita" Released: March 6, 2002

Kumo o mo Tsukamu Tami (Japanese:雲をも掴む民, Japanese Stylized as 雲をも摑む民) (English: People Have to Grasp Even a Cloud) is the third studio album by Japanese pop-rock band Porno Graffitti. It was released on March 27, 2002.

== Release ==
The single "Voice" (ヴォイス) was released on October 17, 2001. It was certified as platinum single by the Recording Industry Association of Japan.

"Shiawase ni tsuite Honki Dashite Kangaete Mita" (幸せについて本気出して考えてみた) (English: I Tried to Think About How Really Happy) was released on March 6, 2002.

== Track listing ==
No.	Title	Length
1.	"Teki ha Dokoda?" (敵はどこだ? / Where is the Enemy?)
2.	"Last of Hero" (ラスト オブ ヒーロー)
3.	"Agehachō (Red Mix)" (アゲハ蝶（Red Mix） / Swallowtail Butterfly)
4.	"Heart" (ハート)
5.	"Aokage"
6.	"Christina" (クリスチーナ)
7.	"n.t."
8.	"Voice" (ヴォイス)
9.	"Palette" (パレット)
10.	"Shiawase ni tsuite Honki Dashite Kangaete Mita (Album Version)" (幸せについて本気出して考えてみた（アルバムバージョン） / I Tried to Think About How Really Happy)
11.	"Nise Kanojo" (ニセ彼女 / Fake Girlfriend)
12.	"Bitter Sweet" (ビタースイート)
13.	"Yoru ha O Shizuka ni" (夜はお静かに / Please be Quiet at Night)
