= M-CABI =

m-CABI

Studio album by Porno Graffitti
- Released: November 22, 2006
- Genre: J-Pop
- Length: 62:07
- Label: SME Records
- Producer: Porno Graffitti

Porno Graffitti chronology
Thump^{χ} (2005)	m-CABI (2006)	Porno Graffitti (2007)

M-CABI (Stylized as m-CABI) is the sixth studio album by the Japanese pop-rock band Porno Graffitti. It was released on November 22, 2006.

== Release ==
To promote M-CABI, the band released the single "NaNaNa Summer Girl" (NaNaNa サマーガール), on August 3, 2005. Sew the interval of the 7th live circuit, which was held from May 7, 2005, to December 18, "SWITCH" was released. The second single, "Yo Bailo/Don't Call me Crazy" (ジョバイロ/DON'T CALL ME CRAZY), was released on November 16, 2005. Together with the tie-up with Porno Graffitti second time of both the A-side single (double face single). "Yo Bailo" means "I Dance" in Spanish. The first image of the title was "Giovanni". "Yo Bailo" is the TBS drama "Kon-ya Hitori no Bed de(今夜ひとりのベッドで / Tonight in Single Bed)" theme song. "Don't Call me Crazy" is the "Daihatsu Move" Music in advertising.

The third single, "Haneuma Rider" (ハネウマライダー), was released on June 28, 2006. All title of the recorded music piece has to fit the rhyme to end in "○○ Rider". This has been produced in the order of "Haneuma Rider", "June Brider", "Taneuma Rider", "The songs" Let is tied rider "" is the brainchild of members that, in the title prior to that idea Street.

The fourth and final single, "Winding Road", was released on October 4, 2006. Used as the ending theme of the Mainichi Broadcasting System and TBS anime series Ayakashi Ayashi.

== Track listing ==
No.	Title	Length
1.	"m-NAVI 1 'Ride on!! Blue vehicle!'"
2.	"Haneuma Rider" (ハネウマライダー)
3.	"Blue Sky"
4.	"Blue Snow"
5.	"m-NAVI 2 'Keep on having fun with the MUSIC CABINET'"
6.	"Winding Road"
7.	"Kyujitsu" (休日 / Holiday)
8.	"NaNaNa Summer Girl" (NaNaNa サマーガール)
9.	"Don't Call me Crazy"
10.	"Yo Bailo" (ジョバイロ)
11.	"m-NAVI 3 'Ready? Silvia, Geronimo, and Lily?'"
12.	"Tsuki Akari no Silvia" (月明りのシルビア / Silvia of the Moonlight)
13.	"Mr. Geronimo" (Mr.ジェロニモ)
14.	"Yokohama Lily" (横浜リリー)
15.	"m-NAVI 4 'Let's enjoy till the end'"
16.	"Line" (ライン)
17.	"Gravity" (グラヴィティ)
