= Thumpx =

Thump^{χ}

Studio album by Porno Graffitti
- Released: April 20, 2005
- Genre: J-Pop
- Length: 61:57
- Label: SME Records
- Producer: Porno Graffitti

Porno Graffitti chronology
Worldillia (2003)	Thump^{χ} (2005)	m-CABI (2006)

Thumpx (Stylized as THUMP^{χ}) is the fifth studio album by the Japanese pop-rock band Porno Graffitti. It was released on April 20, 2005.

For the first time of the album after the Tama withdrawal, it became the original album of two years and two months, the first time across the best album in between Worldillia.

== Release ==
In promotion of Thumpx, the band released the single "Sister" (シスター) on September 8, 2004. In addition major debut fifth anniversary 15 of his single and 20's last work for the two members became the various milestone overlap work for Porno Graffitti.

The second single, "Tasogare Romance" (黄昏ロマンス) (English: Twilight Romance), was released on November 10, 2004. The song is Nippon TV drama, "Ichiban Taisetsuna Hitoha Daredesuka? (一番大切な人は誰ですか?)" Theme song.

The third single, "Neomelodramatic/Roll" (ネオメロドラマティック/ROLL), was released on March 2, 2005. Porno Graffitti's first is a double A-side single, 5th lead single of the album "Thump^{χ}". When the time of introduction of the work without the person referred to, such as "both the A-side," "double A-side", was referred to as "double-face single".

== Track listing ==
No.	Title	Length
1.	"Ouch!!"
2.	"Neomelodramatic" (ネオメロドラマティック)
3.	"Tokyo Land Scape" (東京ランドスケープ)
4.	"We Love Us"
5.	"Tasogare Romance" (黄昏ロマンス / Twilight Romance)
6.	"Twilight" (Twilight, トワイライト / Twilight, Twilight)
7.	"ROLL"
8.	"Sister" (シスター)
9.	"Dreamer" (ドリーマー)
10.	"Shain on the beach" (社員 on the beach / Employee on the beach)
11.	"Push Play" (プッシュプレイ)
12.	"Utakata" (うたかた / Ephemeral Thing)
13.	"Nando mo" (何度も / Many Times)
14.	"Let's go to the answer"
