= Trigger (album) =

Studio album by Porno Graffitti
- Released: March 24, 2010
- Genre: Rock
- Length: 56:14
- Label: SME Records
- Producer: Porno Graffitti

Porno Graffitti chronology
| Porno Graffitti (2007) | Trigger (2010) | Panorama Porno (2012) |

Trigger (Stylized as ∠TRIGGER) is the eighth studio album by the Japanese pop-rock band Porno Graffitti. It was released on March 24, 2010, and was ranked first in the Oricon chart during 2010.

== Release ==
To promote Trigger, the band released the single "Hitomi no Oku o Nozokasete" (Japanese: 瞳の奥をのぞかせて; "Let me look into your eyes") on February 10, 2010. The title track was used as the theme song for the Japanese drama Shukumei 1969-2010. Another single, "Kono Mune o, Ai o Iyo" (この胸を、愛を射よ) (English: This Chest, Shoot Love), was released on September 9, 2009.

== Track listing ==
| No. | Title | Length |
|---|---|---|
| 1. | "∠Receiver" | 4:29 |
| 2. | "Anima Rossa" (アニマロッサ) | 4:31 |
| 3. | "Hitomi no Oku o Nozokasete" (瞳の奥をのぞかせて / Let me Look Into Your Eyes) | 4:27 |
| 4. | "Nega-Posi" (ネガポジ) | 4:46 |
| 5. | "Cliché" (クリシェ) | 4:48 |
| 6. | "In the Dark" | 3:58 |
| 7. | "Introduction: Semarikuru Monster" (Introduction 〜迫リ来ルMONSTER〜 /Introduction: The Approaching Monster) | 0:21 |
| 8. | "Monster" | 4:13 |
| 9. | "Kono Mune o, Ai o Iyo" (この胸を、愛を射よ / This Chest, Shoot Love) | 5:00 |
| 10. | "Aimai na Hitotachi" (曖昧なひとたち / Ambiguous People) | 3:58 |
| 11. | "Hikari no Ya" (光の矢 / Arrow of Light) | 4:39 |
| 12. | "Koyoi, Tsuki ga Miezutomo" (今宵、月が見えずとも / Tonight, Even Without Seeing the Moon) | 4:15 |
| 13. | "Lost" (ロスト) | 6:31 |
