= Foo? =

foo?

Studio album by Porno Graffitti
- Released: February 28, 2001
- Recorded: 2000–2001
- Genre: J-pop
- Length: 55:50
- Label: SME Records
- Producer: Porno Graffitti

Porno Graffitti chronology
Romantist Egoist (2000)	foo? (2001)	Kumo o mo Tsukamu Tami (2002)

Singles from foo?
- 1. "Music Hour" Released: 2000/7/12; 2. "Saudade" Released: 2000/9/13; 3. "Saboten" Released: 2000/12/6

"Foo?" (Stylized as foo?) is the second album by the Japanese rock band Porno Graffitti, it was released on February 28, 2001.

The album's title is a play on the words "Hi, Fu, Mi" (ひぃふぅみぃ/One, Two, Three) from the fact that it is their second album, and the English phrase "Who?". The cover photo is a pink square tile, and Akimitsu Honma revealed that the shadow on the tile is Tama.

== Release ==
Released almost a year after their last album, "Romantist Egoist", the album contains 12 tracks including three hit singles from 2000: "Music Hour", "Saudade" and "Saboten". "Music Hour" (ミュージック・アワー) was released on July 12, 2000, used in a promotion for Otsuka Pharmaceutical's Pocari Sweat. A cover of the song was performed by Poppin'Party and released as part of the BanG Dream! Girls Band Party! Cover Collection Vol. 4 in 2020.

The second single, "Saudade" (サウダージ), was released on September 13, 2000. "Saudade" means in Portuguese such as "Nostalgia" , "Melancholy" , "Emotions Feeling Lost" , essentially the feeling of missing happy times or events that were frequent in the past. The third and final single, "Saboten" (サボテン) (English: Cactus), was released on December 6, 2000.

=== Commercial performance ===
The album ranked #2 for weekly Oricon charts.

== Track listing ==
No.	Title	Length
1.	"INNERVISIONS"	4:34
2.	"Guava Juice" (グァバジュース)	4:22
3.	"Saudade "D" tour style" (サウダージ "D" tour style)	4:26
4.	"Ai Naki…" (愛なき… / Without Love…)	5:17
5.	"Ore, Tenshi" (オレ、天使 / I am, Angel)	3:58
6.	"Saboten" (サボテン / Cactus)	4:54
7.	"Name is Man 〜Kimi no Mikata〜" (Name is man 〜君の味方〜 / Name is Man 〜Your Side〜)	4:58
8.	"Draw #2 Harumitsu" (デッサン #2 春光)	5:20
9.	"Music Hour Ver.164" (ミュージック・アワー Ver.164)	4:39
10.	"Kūsō Kagaku Shōnen" (空想科学少年 / Science Fiction Boy)	4:58
11.	"Report 21"	5:17
12.	"Yoake Mae ni ha" (夜明けまえには / Before Dawn)	4:40
