= Worldillia =

Studio album by Porno Graffitti
- Released: February 26, 2003
- Genre: J-Pop
- Length: 62:23
- Label: SME Records
- Producer: Porno Graffitti

Porno Graffitti chronology
Kumo o mo Tsukamu Tami (2002)	Worldillia (2003)	Thump^{χ} (2005)

Worldillia is the fourth studio album by Japanese pop-rock band Porno Graffitti. It was released on February 26, 2003. The album's title was coined by combining the word "world", which often appears in the lyrics, with sounds like "Arcadia" and "Shangri-La", meaning "Paradise" and "Utopia".

As Masami Shiratama left the band in July 2004, this was the last original album with him.

== Release ==
The release was accompanied by the release of the single "Mugen" on May 15, 2002. The title has two different meanings: "infinity" (無限 mugen) and "fantasy" (夢幻 mugen). These two words are homonyms. it was used by NHK as their opening song for their coverage of the 2002 FIFA World Cup.

The second single, "Uzu" (渦) (English: Vortex) was released on February 5, 2003. TV Asahi Friday night drama "Skyhigh" theme song and NHK "Pop Jam" ending theme.

== Track listing ==
No.	Title	Length
1.	"CLUB UNDERWORLD"	3:41
2.	"Wakusei Kimi" (惑星キミ / Planet Your)	4:57
3.	"Element L" (元素L)	4:49
4.	"Mugen"	4:14
5.	"Draw #3" (デッサン #3)	4:30
6.	"Vintage" (ヴィンテージ)	4:41
7.	"World ☆ Saturday Graffiti (★★★)" (ワールド☆サタデーグラフティ(★★★))	4:10
8.	"Subarashiki Jinsei Kana?" (素晴らしき人生かな? / Is it a Wonderful Life?)	4:46
9.	"Akai Orange" (朱いオレンジ / Vermillion Orange)	4:55
10.	"Go Steady Go!"	4:26
11.	"Karma no Saka" (カルマの坂 / Slope of the Karma)	5:14
12.	"Didgedilli"	3:04
13.	"Uzu (Helix Track)" (渦（Helix Track） / Vortex)	4:50
14.	"Kuchibiru ni Uta" (くちびるにうた / Song on the Lips)	4:05
