= Akihito Okano =

Japanese musician (born 1974)

- 岡野 昭仁
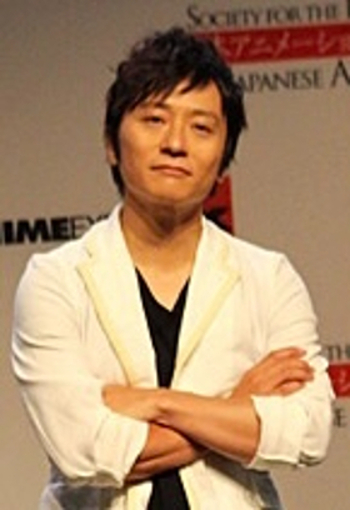
- Okano in 2013
- Born: October 15, 1974 (age 52); Innoshima, Hiroshima, Japan
- Education: Hiroshima Prefectural Innoshima High School
- Occupation: Musician
- Years active: 1994–present
- Agent: Amuse Inc.
- Spouse: Unknown (m. 2008)
- Children: 1
- Musical career
- Genres: J-pop; rock; Latin
- Instruments: Vocals; guitar; piano; blues harp; chromatic harmonica
- Label: Sony
- Member of: Porno Graffitti

Akihito Okano (岡野 昭仁, Okano Akihito; born 15 October 1974) is a Japanese musician, vocalist of rock band Porno Graffitti.

== Early life and career ==
Okano was born in Nakasho, Innoshima City (now Onomichi City), Hiroshima. Okano is the youngest of three siblings (he has two older sisters). His parents wanted to name him "Satoru", but received the name of Akihito from his uncle, as part of a family tradition.

As a child, he wanted to be an athlete. He played baseball in elementary school, and was in track and field and soccer in junior high. His interest in music started in elementary school, when he started listening to Western music thanks to one of his sisters, and singing Japanese songs in family reunions.

=== High school years ===
In 1990, he entered Innoshima High School, where he met Haruichi Shindō. They became friends in the second year of high school, after attending a party where Shindō was in, to which Okano was invited by a friend. They began to go together to karaoke, and later on, Okano was invited by Shindō to form part of his band "No Score" as part of the chorus, to participate in the school festival. After the festival, Shindō decided to leave the vocals to Okano, and he made his vocalist debut at the entrance ceremony the following Spring.

=== Indies era ===
After graduating from high school in 1993, "No Score" was disbanded.

Starting in Spring 1993, Okano entered prep school, living in a dorm. While studying, and playing soccer and pachinko with dorm friends, his music interest had moved to heavy metal and hard rock, and he started to be interested the content in radio programs and music magazines. He continued to go to karaoke with friends, and had stated that he was going to have a band by next year.

The five members of "No Score" reunited in Osaka, forming a new band, but two members left after no activity. By Summer 1994, they formed another band, which they called "Porno Graffitti", and started having live performances and event appearances.

In March 1997, Okano (and Porno Graffitti) passed the "SD Audition" and signed a contract with SME and Amuse. By end of September of the same year, he moved his base of operations from Osaka to Tokyo. By Summer of 1998 he began producing music and recording for their major debut.

== Musical career ==
=== Major debut era and beyond ===
On 8 September 1999, Pornograffitti made their debut with the single "Apollo".

On 31 December 2000, Pornografitti had their first appearance in NHK's Kouhaku (#51).

From 7 April 2007 to 30 March 2010, Okano hosted Nippon Broadcasting System's radio program "All Night Nippon". On 3 January 2021 he returned to hosting duties in the program. On 31 May 2022, he shared hosting duties with Satoru Iguchi (King Gnu).

From 5 October 2013 to 27 September 2014, he hosted FM802's radio program "Live it Up".

On 23 May 2020 he started the program "Dispatchers" on YouTube,

On 25 November 2020, Okano announced the start of the project "Walkin' with a song", and the information on the project's first song's release. The first song, "Hikari are", was released on 20 January 2021. The second song, "Shaft of Light", was released 12 April 2021. Third song, "Sono saki no hikari e", was released 2 July 2021. Fourth song, "Melody (prod.by Breimen)", was released 9 May 2022. An album containing all these songs and 6 more, was released on 23 August 2023, making it the first album released by Okano, his debut album as solo artist.

From 2013 and on, Okano has participated in several events and concerts as guest, including Soccer player and coach Toshiya Fujita's Farewell Match in Kokuritsu, "NIKE FTBL CUP" held at Toyosu MIFA Football Park (23 June 2018), the live viewing event "Bilibili Macro Link" (10-11 July 2021), Mayday's Nippon Budokan performance "Re:DNA ~2017 Reprint Edition~" (4 February 2017), the event "3rd Kakesugi Jamboree" hosted by Shikao Suga (29 February 2020) and "J-WAVE Holiday Special Tokyo Guitar Jamboree 2020 ~ Roppongi Basho" (20 March 2020).

=== Participating works as guest vocalist ===
Fairlife

- Forever friend (feat Akihito Okano from Pornograffitti) (Single "Eien no tomodachi", 23 September 2004)
- Winter vacation (feat Akihito Okano from Pornograffitti) (album "Have a nice life ", 1 December 2004)
- Sad autumn shower (feat Akihito Okano from Pornograffitti); Monster (feat Akihito Okano from Pornograffitti) (album "Bread, sheep and love letter", 7 March 2007)
- Tabiseyou wakoudo (feat Akihito Okano from Pornograffitti) (single "Tabiseyou wakoudo", 20 January 2010)
- Tabiseyou wakoudo (feat Akihito Okano from Pornograffitti); Michikusa (feat Akihito Okano from Pornograffitti) (album "Michikusa biyori", 3 February 2010)

Ukasuka-G

- Haru no uta (album "Amigo", 11 June 2014)

Mayday

- Song for you (album "History of Tomorrow", 1 February 2017)

Hiroyuki Sawano (as SawanoHiroyuki[nZk])

- Everchild (album "Remember", 9 March 2019)

Shikao Suga

- To you (Anata e) (YouTube exclusive video, 29 April 2020)

=== Participating works as composer ===
Tsunomaki Watame (VTuber)

- Fins (single "Fins".7 June 2023, song composition in collaboration with tasuku)

== Personal life ==
In January 2008, he reported his marriage through the recently opened Porno Graffitti Fan Club. They have one child born in late May 2009.
