= Panorama Porno =

Studio album by Porno Graffitti
- Released: March 28, 2012
- Recorded: August 2011 – February 2012
- Genre: Rock
- Length: 66:44
- Label: SME Records
- Producer: Porno Graffitti

Porno Graffitti chronology
| Trigger (2010) | Panorama Porno (2012) | RHINOCEROS (2015) |

Panorama Porno is the ninth studio album by the Japanese pop-rock band Porno Graffitti. It was released on March 28, 2012.

== Track listing ==
| No. | Title | Length |
|---|---|---|
| 1. | "2012 Spark (Panorama Ver.)" | 4:29 |
| 2. | "Major" (メジャー) | 4:47 |
| 3. | "FLAG" | 4:40 |
| 4. | "EXIT" | 5:19 |
| 5. | "Denkousekka" (電光石火) | 3:37 |
| 6. | "Hoshikyuu" (星球) | 4:19 |
| 7. | "Suteki Sugite Shimatta" (素敵すぎてしまった) | 5:05 |
| 8. | "One More Time" (ワンモアタイム) | 4:06 |
| 9. | "Cassiopeia no Koukai" (カシオペヤの後悔) | 4:20 |
| 10. | "Kimi wa 100%" (君は100%) | 4:02 |
| 11. | "Truly" | 1:49 |
| 12. | "Yuki no Iro" (ゆきのいろ) | 4:46 |
| 13. | "Hanamuke" (はなむけ) | 4:04 |
| 14. | "Merry-go-round" (メリーゴーラウンド) | 4:19 |
