= Porno Graffitti =

Japanese rock band

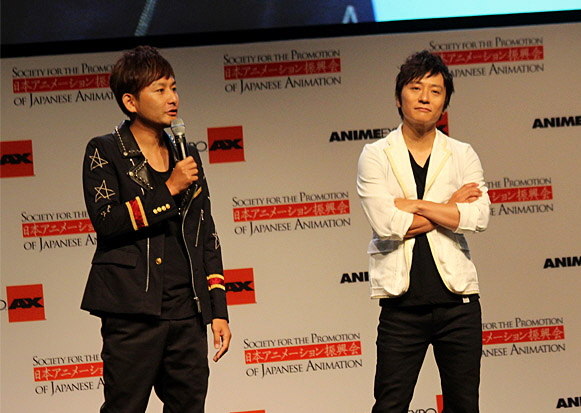
- Porno Graffitti at Anime Expo 2013

Background information
- Origin: Onomichi, Hiroshima, Japan
- Genres: Alternative rock; power pop; funk rock; patchanka
- Years active: 1994–present
- Label: SME Records (1999–present)
- Members: Akihito Okano; Haruichi Shindō
- Past members: Tama
- Website: pornograffitti.jp

Porno Graffitti (ポルノグラフィティ, Poruno Gurafiti), also known as Porno (ポルノ, Poruno), are a Japanese rock band from Onomichi (formerly Innoshima), Hiroshima Prefecture. The band got their name from the album Pornograffitti by the band Extreme. They currently record under the SME Records label and their agency is Amuse, Inc.

== History ==
Haruichi Shindō originally formed the band with his cousin during high school and named it "No Score." After the band started, Haruichi asked Akihito Okano and Tama to join. The band was so named because none of them could actually read a score when they first started. When they first started the band Haruichi was the vocalist, but he found out that Akihito could sing better and gave the vocalist position to Akihito, taking over as guitarist instead. This was the foundation of Porno Graffitti. They debuted with the song Apollo in 1999. Their two subsequent CD singles, Saudade and Agehachō, both sold over a million copies in Japan.

The band is well known for their work in creating music for anime series and movies. They are particularly well known for the song "Melissa", which was used as the opening theme of the anime series Fullmetal Alchemist in 2003. In addition, they have created the songs "Hitori no Yoru" for the second opening theme of the anime series GTO (2000), "Winding Road" for the ending theme of the anime series Ayakashi Ayashi (2006), "The Day" for the first opening theme of the anime series My Hero Academia (2016), "Montage" for an opening theme of the anime Puzzle & Dragons X, "Hikari Are", the first opening theme for both The Seven Deadly Sins: Dragon's Judgement and the final season of The Seven Deadly Sins, and most recently "The Revo" for the opening theme in the final season of My Hero Academia.

Their song "Koyoi, Tsuki ga, Miezu Tomo" was featured in the third Bleach film, and their single "Anima Rossa" was featured as the eleventh opening to Bleach. Their single "2012Spark" was featured as the main theme song of the movie Gyakuten Saiban and their single "Matataku Hoshi no Shita de" was the second opening theme for the anime Magi: The Labyrinth of Magic. Their single "Oh! Rival" is part of the soundtrack for the 2015 Detective Conan film. The single "Breath" was the ending song for Pokémon the Movie: The Power of Us, "VS" as the opening theme for Mix.

They are also featured in video game music, with a cover of their 2000 single "Music Hour" used for a stage of the Nintendo DS rhythm game Moero! Nekketsu Rhythm Damashii Osu! Tatakae! Ouendan 2.

== Members ==
=== Current members ===
- Akihito Okano (岡野 昭仁 Okano Akihito, born October 15, 1974) — Lead vocals and rhythm guitar
- Haruichi Shindō (新藤 晴一 Shindō Haruichi, born September 20, 1974) — Lead guitar and backing vocals

=== Past member ===
- Masami "Tama" Shiratama (白玉 雅己, Shiratama Masami) — Bass guitar and backing vocals (left in June 2004)

== Discography ==
=== Singles ===
- "Apollo" (アポロ, Aporo) - September 8, 1999
- "Hitori no Yoru" (ヒトリノ夜; "A Lonely Night") - January 26, 2000
- "Music Hour" (ミュージック・アワー, Myūjikku Awā) - July 12, 2000
- "Saudade" (サウダージ, Saudāji; "Nostalgia") - September 13, 2000
- "Saboten" (サボテン; "Cactus") - December 6, 2000
- "Agehachō" (アゲハ蝶; "Swallowtail") - June 27, 2001
- "Voice" (ヴォイス, Voisu) - October 17, 2001
- "Shiawase ni tsuite Honki Dashite Kangaete Mita" (幸せについて本気出して考えてみた; "I Tried to Think Seriously about Happiness") - March 6, 2002
- "Mugen" (Note: The title"Mugen" has two different meanings: "infinity" (無限, mugen) and "fantasy" (夢幻, mugen). These two words are homonyms.) – May 15, 2002
- "Uzu" (渦; "Whirlpool") - February 5, 2003
- "Oto no Nai Mori" (音のない森; "Soundless Forest") - August 6, 2003
- "Melissa" (メリッサ, Merissa) - September 26, 2003
- "Ai ga Yobu Hō e" (愛が呼ぶほうへ; "To the Place Where Love Is Calling") - November 6, 2003
- "Lack" (ラック, Rakku) - December 3, 2003
- "Sister" (シスター, Shisutā) - September 8, 2004
- "Tasogare Romance"" (黄昏ロマンス; "Twilight Romance") - November 10, 2004
- "Neomelodramatic/Roll" (ネオメロドラマティック/ROLL, Neomerodoramatikku/ROLL) - March 2, 2005
- "NaNaNa Summer Girl" (NaNaNa サマーガール, NaNaNa Samā Gāru) - August 3, 2005
- "Yo Bailo/Don't Call Me Crazy" (ジョバイロ/DON'T CALL ME CRAZY, Jo Bairo/DON'T CALL ME CRAZY) - November 16, 2005
- "Haneuma Rider" (ハネウマライダー, Haneuma Raidā; "Mad Horse Rider") - June 28, 2006
- "Winding Road" – October 4, 2006
- "Link" (リンク, Rinku) - July 18, 2007
- "Anata ga Koko ni Itara" (あなたがここにいたら; "If You Were Here") - February 14, 2008
- "Itai Tachiichi" (痛い立ち位置; "Painful Positions") - June 25, 2008
- "Gifts" (ギフト, Gifuto) - August 20, 2008
- "Love,too Death,too" – October 8, 2008
- "Koyoi, Tsuki ga Miezutomo" (今宵、月が見えずとも; "If the Moon Can't Be Seen Tonight") - December 10, 2008
- "Kono Mune wo, Ai wo Iyo" (この胸を、愛を射よ; "Strike This Heart, with Love" or"This Chest, Shoot It with Love") - September 9, 2009
- "Anima Rossa" (アニマロッサ; "Red Soul") - November 25, 2009
- "Hitomi no Oku o Nozokasete" (瞳の奥をのぞかせて; "Let the Depths of Eyes Peep Out") - February 10, 2010
- "Kimi wa 100%" (君は100%, Kimi wa Hyaku Pāsento; "You are 100%") - October 27, 2010
- "EXIT" – March 2, 2011
- "One More Time" (ワンモアタイム, Wan Moa Taimu) - September 21, 2011
- "Yuki no Iro" (ゆきのいろ; "The Color of Snow") - November 23, 2011
- "2012 Spark" – February 8, 2012
- "Kageboushi" (カゲボウシ; "Silhoutte") - September 19, 2012
- "Matataku Hoshi no Shita de" (瞬く星の下で; "Under The Twinkle Star") - March 6, 2013
- "Seishun Hanamichi" (青春花道; "A Youth Way") - September 11, 2013
- "Tokyo Destiny" (東京デスティニー, Tokyo Desutini) - October 16, 2013
- "Oretachi no Celebration" (俺たちのセレブレーション, Oretachi no Serebureshon; "Our Celebration") - September 3, 2014
- "One Woman Show ~Amai Maboroshi~" (ワン・ウーマン・ショー ～甘い幻～, Wan Uman Sho ~Amai Maboroshi~; "One Woman Show ~Sweet Illusion~") - November 5, 2014
- "Oh! Rival" (オー！リバル | O! Ribaru) - April 15, 2015
- "THE DAY" – May 25, 2016
- "LiAR/Masshiro na Hai ni naru made, Moyashi tsukuse" (LiAR/真っ白な灰になるまで、燃やし尽くせ; "LiAR / Burned Out, Until Becoming White Ash") - November 9, 2016
- "King&Queen/Montage" (キング&クイーン /Montage, Kingu&Kuin/Montage) - September 6, 2017
- "Chameleon・Lens" (カメレオン・レンズ, Kamereon Renzu) - March 21, 2018
- "Breath" (ブレス, Buresu) - July 25, 2018
- "VS" – July 31, 2019
- "Theme Song" (テーマソング, Tēmasongu) - September 22, 2021
- "Kaihōku" (解放区, "Liberated Area") - March 27, 2024
- "THE REVO" - November 19, 2025
- "Hamidashi Gomen" (はみだし御免, "Desperado") - January 11, 2026

==== Digital Single ====
- "m-FLOOD" – February 28, 2007
- "Zombies are standing out" – September 28, 2018
- "Flower" (フラワー, Furawaā) – December 14, 2018
- "Saudade - From THE FIRST TAKE" (サウダージ - From THE FIRST TAKE, Saudāji - From THE FIRST TAKE; "Nostalgia") – November 16, 2021
- "Theme Song - From THE FIRST TAKE" (テーマソング - From THE FIRST TAKE, Tēmasongu - From THE FIRST TAKE) – November 16, 2021
- "Abi Ga Naku" (アビが鳴く, Abi Ga Naku) – May 31, 2023

=== Albums ===
==== Original albums ====
1. Romantist Egoist (ロマンチスト・エゴイスト, Romanchisuto Egoisuto) - March 8, 2000
2. foo? – February 28, 2001
3. Kumo o mo Tsukamu Tami (雲をも掴む民; People Grasping Even a Cloud) - March 27, 2002
4. Worldillia – February 26, 2003
5. Thumpx – April 20, 2005
6. M-CABI – November 22, 2006
7. The 7th Album Porno Graffitti – August 29, 2007
8. Trigger – March 24, 2010
9. Panorama Porno – March 28, 2012
10. Rhinoceros – August 19, 2015
11. Butterly Effect – October 25, 2017
12. Akatsuki (暁, Dawn) - August 3, 2022

==== Best albums ====
1. Porno Graffitti Best Red's – July 28, 2004
2. Porno Graffitti Best Blue's – July 28, 2004
3. Porno Graffitti Best Ace – October 29, 2008
4. Porno Graffitti Best Joker – October 29, 2008
5. PORNOGRAFFITTI 15th Anniversary "ALL TIME SINGLES" – November 20, 2013
6. PORNOGRAFFITTI Complete Works ~ ALL TIME SINGLES~ September 4, 2024

=== DVDs ===
- Tour 08452: Welcome to My Heart (September 6, 2000)
- Porno Graffitti Visual Works Opening Lap (March 14, 2001)
- "Bitter Sweet Music Biz" Live in Budokan 2002 (March 26, 2003)
- "74ers" Live in Osaka-Jo Hall 2003 (March 24, 2004)
- 5th Anniversary Special Live "Purple's" in Tokyo Taiikukan 2004 (March 24, 2005)
- 7th Live Circuit "Switch" 2005 (March 29, 2006)
- Yokohama Romance Porno '06: Catch the Haneuma: In Yokohama Stadium (February 28, 2007)
- "Open Music Cabinet" Live in Saitama Super Arena 2007 (October 31, 2007)
- "Porno Graffitti Has Come" Live in Zepp Tokyo 2008 (May 21, 2008)
- "Awaji Yokohama Romance Porno'08, 10 Year's of Gift!" Live in Awajishima (January 28, 2009)
- OPENING LAP (September 9, 2009)
- PG CLIPS 2nd LAP (September 9, 2009)
- PG CLIPS 3rd LAP (September 9, 2009)
- PG CLIPS 4th LAP (September 9, 2009)
- "Royal Straight Flush" LIVE IN YOYOGI DAIICHI TAIIKUKAN 2009 (October 28, 2009)
- "Target" Live in JCB Hall 2010 (9 Maret 2011)
- Tsumagoi no Romance Porno '11 "Porno Maru" (December 21, 2011)
- Makuhari Romance Porno '11 "Days of Wonder" (July 4, 2012)
- 12th LIVE CIRCUIT "PANORAMA x 42" SPECIAL LIVE PACKAGE (April 3, 2013)
- 13th Live Circuit "Love E-Mail From 1999" Live in MARINE MESSE FUKUOKA (August 6, 2014)
- "Kobe Yohohama Romance Porno'13 ~Madowazu no Mori~ Live at Yokohama Stadium " (February 25, 2015)
- 14th Live Circuit "The dice are cast " Live in OSAKA-JO HALL 2015 (April 13, 2016)
- "FANCLUB UNDERWORLD 5 Live in Zepp DiverCity 2016" (October 26, 2016)
- "Yokohama Romance Porno '16 ～THE WAY～ Live in YOKOHAMA STADIUM" (April 26, 2017)
- PORNOGRAFFITTI "Sèqíng túyā" Special Live in Taiwan (December 20, 2017)
- 15th Live Circuit "BUTTERFLY EFFECT" Live in KOBE KOKUSAI HALL 2018 (September 5, 2018)
- 16th Live Circuit "UNFADED" Live in YOKOHAMA ARENA (December 25, 2019)
- PORNO GRAFFITTI 20th Anniversary Special Live Box (December 25, 2019)
- 20th Anniversary Special LIVE NIPPON Romance Porno '19 ~Kami vs Kami~ DAY1 (December 25, 2019)
- 20th Anniversary Special LIVE NIPPON Romance Porno '19 ~Kami vs Kami~ DAY2 (December 25, 2019)
- 17th Live Circuit "ZOKU・PORNO GRAFFITTI" Live at TOKYO GARDEN THEATER 2021 (March 30, 2022)
- 18th Live Circuit "AKATSUKI" Live at NIPPON BUDOKAN 2023 (May 10, 2023)
- 19th Live Circuit "PG wasn't built in a day" LIVE at TOKYO ARIAKE ARENA 2024 (September 4th, 2024)

== Books ==
- The History of Porno Graffitti from Innoshima (ワイラノ クロニクル, March 23, 2001)
- Real Days (April 19, 2004)
- Porno Graffitti Document Photo Book 7th Live Circuit "Switch" (March 29, 2006)
- Bessatsu Kadokawa Sōryoku Tokushū Porno Graffitti "Chōsen" (April 6, 2012)
- PORNOGRAFFITTI × PATi►PATi COMPLETE BOOK ～15years file～ (October 1, 2014)

== Concerts ==
=== LIVE CIRCUIT ===
- 1st Live Circuit "Tour 08452: Welcome to My Heart"
- 2nd Live Circuit "D4-33-4"
- 3rd Live Circuit "Japan Tour"
- 4th Live Circuit "Cupid (Is Painted Blind)"
- 5th LIVE CIRCUIT "BITTER SWEET MUSIC BIZ"
- 6th LIVE CIRCUIT "74ers"
- C1000 Takeda Presents 7th LIVE CIRCUIT "SWITCH"
- 8th LIVE CIRCUIT "OPEN MUSIC CABINET"
- SUBARU IMPREZA presents 9th LIVE CIRCUIT "Porno Graffitti ga Yatte kita"
- 10th LIVE CIRCUIT "Royal Straight Flush"
- 11th LIVE CIRCUIT "∠TARGET"
- 12th LIVE CIRCUIT "PANORAMA×42"
- 13th LIVE CIRCUIT "Love E-Mail From 1999"
- 14th LIVE CIRCUIT "The dice are cast"
- 15th LIVE CIRCUIT "BUTTERFLY EFFECT"
- 16th LIVE CIRCUIT "UNFADED"
- 17th LIVE CIRCUIT "ZOKU・PORNO GRAFFITTI"
- 18th LIVE CIRCUIT "AKATSUKI"
- 19th LIVE CIRCUIT "PG wasn't built in a day"

=== ROMANCE PORNO ===
- Tokyo Romance Porno vol.3 (1999) @ Shibuya On Air West
- Tokyo Romance Porno vol 4: 横 (Yoko) G @ Shibuya Public Hall
- Yokohama Romance Porno '06: Catch the Haneuma: @ Yokohama Stadium
- Awaji Yokohama Romance Porno '08: 10 Year's of Gift @ Akashi Kaikyo National Government Park Grass Square / Yokohama Stadium
- Tokyo Romance Porno '09: Days of Love and Youth @ Tokyo Dome
- Tsumagoi Romance Porno '11: Porno Maru @ Yamaha Resort Tsumakoi
- Tohoku Romance Porno '11: Porno Port @ Zepp Sendai
- Makuhari Romance Porno '11: Days of Wonder @ Makuhari Messe International Exhibition Hall 9 - 12
- Kobe Yohohama Romance Porno '14 ~Madowazu no Mori~ Live at Yokohama Stadium
- Yokohama Romance Porno '16 ~ THE WAY~ @ Yokohama Stadium
- Shimanaminami Romance Porno '18: DEEP BREATH @ Hiroshima Prefectural Bingo Sports Park
- Shimanami Romance Porno '18: THE LIVE VIEWING @ Innoshima Civic Hall
- Nippon Romance Porno '19: God vs God @ Tokyo Dome
- Cyber Romance Porno '20 ~ Reunion (online)
- Innoshima Yokohama Romance Porno '24: Liberation Zone @ Yahama Resort Tsumakoi / Yokohama Stadium

=== SPECIAL TOUR / LIVE ===
- FANCLUB UNDERWORLD (2003)
- FANCLUB UNDERWORLD 2 (2004)
- 5th Anniversary Special Live: PURPLE'S
- PORNOGRAFFITTI Premium Live (2005) presents by C1000
- PORNOGRAFFITTI Live at Innoshima City (2005)
- FANCLUB UNDERWORLD 3 (2008)
- FANCLUB UNDERWORLD 4 (2012)
- PORNOGRAFFITTI Special Live in Taiwan (2017)
- PORNOGRAFFITTI TikTok LIVE at Itsukushima Shrine (2023)
- FANCLUB UNDERWORLD 5 (2016)

== Movie ==
Shindō appeared in the movie Road 88: Deai-michi Shikoku e (ロード88 出会い路、四国へ) in 2003 (road show in 2004). He played a gangster by the name of Bessho (別所). This is the first and only movie in which he has appeared.

== See also ==
- Masami Shiratama
- Innoshima, Hiroshima
