= Domoto discography =

- Studio albums: 17
- Compilation albums: 6
- Singles: 47
- Video albums: 25

The discography of Japanese group Domoto (known as KinKi Kids from 1993 to 2025) consists of 17 studio albums, 6 compilation albums, 25 video albums and 47 singles. All of Domoto's singles have reached number one on the Oricon chart in Japan. All of their music has been released by Johnny's Entertainment in Japan. In Taiwan, Domoto's music has been released under Forward Music from 1997 to 2000, Skyhigh Entertainment and What's Music in 2001, and Avex Taiwan from 2002 to the present.

== Studio albums ==
List of albums, with selected chart positions
| Title | Album details | Peak positions | | | | Sales (JPN) | Certifications |
| Title | Album details | JPN | JPN Comb (Note: The Oricon Combined Albums Chart was established on December 24, 2018.) | TWN (Note: The G-Music chart was established in July 2005 and only archives the top 20 releases.) | TWN East Asian (Note: Position was taken from 2005 week 50 for H Album, 2006 week 52 for I Album, 2007 week 48 for Phi, 2009 week 52 for J Album, 2011 week 48 for K Album, 2013 week 52 for L Album, 2015 week 2 for M Album.) | Sales (JPN) | Certifications |
|---|---|---|---|---|---|---|---|
| A Album | Released: July 21, 1997; Label: Johnny's Entertainment; Formats: CD | 1 | — | — | — | 1,030,850 | RIAJ: Million |
| B Album | Released: August 12, 1998; Label: Johnny's; Formats: CD | 1 | — | — | — | 867,465 | RIAJ: Million |
| C Album | Released: August 4, 1999; Label: Johnny's; Formats: CD | 1 | — | — | — | 812,640 | RIAJ: 2× Platinum |
| D Album | Released: December 13, 2000; Label: Johnny's; Formats: CD | 1 | — | — | — | 506,200 | RIAJ: Platinum |
| E Album | Released: July 25, 2001; Label: Johnny's; Formats: CD | 1 | — | — | — | 523,380 | RIAJ: Platinum |
| F Album | Released: December 26, 2002; Label: Johnny's; Formats: CD | 2 | — | — | — | 399,659 | RIAJ: Platinum |
| G Album: 24/7 | Released: October 22, 2003; Label: Johnny's; Formats: CD | 1 | — | — | — | 323,699 | RIAJ: Platinum |
| H Album: Hand | Released: November 16, 2005; Label: Johnny's; Formats: CD, CD/DVD | 1 | — | 4 | 2 | 314,539 | RIAJ: Platinum |
| I Album: ID | Released: December 13, 2006; Label: Johnny's; Formats: CD, CD/DVD | 1 | — | 6 | 1 | 288,093 | RIAJ: Platinum |
| Phi | Released: November 14, 2007; Label: Johnny's; Formats: CD, CD/DVD | 1 | — | 7 | 1 | 236,136 | RIAJ: Platinum |
| J Album | Released: December 9, 2009; Label: Johnny's; Formats: CD, CD/DVD | 1 | — | 13 | 1 | 207,582 | RIAJ: Gold |
| K Album | Released: November 9, 2011; Label: Johnny's; Formats: CD, CD/DVD | 1 | — | 4 | 1 | 181,458 | RIAJ: Gold |
| L Album | Released: December 13, 2013; Label: Johnny's; Formats: 2CD, 2CD/DVD | 1 | — | 12 | 2 | 160,339 | RIAJ: Gold |
| M Album | Released: December 10, 2014; Label: Johnny's; Formats: 2CD, 2CD/DVD | 1 | — | 5 | 1 | 154,747 | RIAJ: Gold |
| N Album | Released: September 21, 2016; Label: Johnny's; Formats: 2CD, 2CD/DVD | 1 | — | — | — | 151,376 | RIAJ: Gold |
| O Album | Released: December 23, 2020; Label: Johnny's; Formats: CD, CD/BD | 1 | 1 | — | — | 147,777 | RIAJ: Gold |
| P Album | Released: December 12, 2023; Label: Johnny's; Formats: CD, CD/BD | 1 | 1 | — | — | 189,088 | |

== Compilation albums ==
List of compilation albums, with selected chart positions
| Title | Album details | Peak positions | | | Sales (JPN) | Certifications | Notes |
| Title | Album details | JPN | TWN | TWN East Asian (Note: Position was taken from 2007 week 32 for 39.) | Sales (JPN) | Certifications | Notes |
|---|---|---|---|---|---|---|---|
| KinKi Single Selection | Released: May 17, 2000; Label: Johnny's; Formats: CD | 1 | — | — | 1,252,873 | RIAJ: Million | |
| KinKi Karaoke Single Selection | Backing track compilation album; Released: July 19, 2000; Label: Johnny's; Formats: CD | 28 | — | — | 18,550 | | |
| KinKi Single Selection II | Released: December 22, 2004; Label: Johnny's; Formats: CD | 1 | — | — | 544,874 | RIAJ: 2× Platinum | |
| 39 | Released: July 18, 2007; Label: Johnny's; Formats: 3CD, 3CD/DVD | 1 | 7 | 1 | 457,157 | RIAJ: 2× Platinum | |
| Ballad Selection | Released: January 6, 2017; Label: Johnny's; Formats: CD | 1 | ? | ? | 158,931 | RIAJ: Gold | |
| The Best | Released: December 6, 2017; Label: Johnny's; Formats: CD | 1 | ? | ? | 229,393 | RIAJ: Platinum | |
| 39 Very Much | Released: July 21, 2025; Label: Elov Label; Formats: 4 CD + 3 Blu-ray; 4 CD + 3 DVD | — | — | — | | | Last as KinKi Kids |

== Singles ==
| # | Title | Release date | Peak chart positions | | | | | Sales (JPN) | Certifications | Album |
| # | Title | Release date | JPN | JPN Comb (Note: The Oricon Combined Singles Chart was established on December 24, 2018.) | JPN Hot (Note: The Japan Hot 100 was established in February 2008.) (Note: Sources for chart positions are as follows: "Secret Code", "Yakusoku", "Swan Song", "Family", "Time", "Kawatta Katachi no Ishi", "Mada Namida ni Naranai Kanashimi ga", "Kagi no Nai Hako", "Hikari no Kehai", "Amazing Love", "Schrödinger", "Ai no Katamari", "Matane".) | TWN | TWN East Asian (Note: Position was taken from 2008 week 37 for "Secret Code", 2009 week 7 for "Yakusoku", 2009 week 46 for "Swan Song", 2010 week 51 for "Family", 2011 week 27 for "Time", 2012 week 6 for "Kawatta Katachi no Ishi", 2013 week 45 for "Mada Namida".) | Sales (JPN) | Certifications | Album |
As KinKi Kids
| 1 | "Glass no Shōnen" (硝子の少年, Garasu no Shōnen; "Glass Boy") | July 21, 1997 | 1 | — | — | — | — | 1,793,011 | RIAJ (physical): 4× Platinum (Note: The 4× Platinum threshold was depreciated in 2003, but represents 1,600,000 copies shipped to stores.) | B Album |
| 2 | "Aisareru yori Aishitai" (愛されるより愛したい; "Loving Over Being Loved") | November 12, 1997 | 1 | — | — | — | — | 1,644,776 | RIAJ (physical): 4× Platinum | B Album |
| 3 | "Jetcoaster Romance" (ジェットコースター・ロマンス, Jettokōsutā Romansu) | April 22, 1998 | 1 | — | — | — | — | 944,500 | RIAJ (physical): Million | B Album |
| 4 | "Zenbu Dakishimete" (全部だきしめて; "Hold All of You") | July 29, 1998 | 1 | — | — | — | — | 1,159,578 | RIAJ (physical): Million (Note: Received a 3× Platinum which before 2003 referred to 1,200,000 copies shipped.) | C Album |
| 4 | "Ao no Jidai" (青の時代; "A Blue Era") | July 29, 1998 | 1 | — | — | — | — | 1,159,578 | RIAJ (physical): Million | C Album |
| 5 | "Happy Happy Greeting" | December 9, 1998 | 1 | — | — | — | — | 614,713 | RIAJ (physical): 2× Platinum | KinKi Single Selection |
| 5 | "Cinderella Christmas" (シンデレラ・クリスマス, Shinderera Kurisumasu) | December 9, 1998 | 1 | — | — | — | — | 614,713 | RIAJ (physical): 2× Platinum | KinKi Single Selection |
| 6 | "Yamenaide, Pure" (やめないで, PURE; "Don't Stop, Pure") | February 24, 1999 | 1 | — | — | — | — | 652,622 | RIAJ (physical): Platinum | C Album |
| 7 | "Flower" (フラワー, Furawā) | May 25, 1999 | 1 | — | — | — | — | 1,046,333 | RIAJ (physical): Million | C Album |
| 8 | "Ame no Melody" (雨のMelody; "Rain Melody") | October 6, 1999 | 1 | — | — | — | — | 852,173 | RIAJ (physical): 2× Platinum | KinKi Single Selection |
| 8 | "To Heart" | October 6, 1999 | 1 | — | — | — | — | 852,173 | RIAJ (physical): 2× Platinum | KinKi Single Selection |
| 9 | "Suki ni Natteku Aishiteku" (好きになってく 愛してく; "Growing to Like You, Growing to Love You") | March 8, 2000 | 1 | — | — | — | — | 525,980 | RIAJ (physical): Platinum | KinKi Single Selection |
| 9 | "KinKi no Yaruki Manman Song" (KinKiのやる気まんまんソング; "The Full of Effort Kinki Song") | March 8, 2000 | 1 | — | — | — | — | 525,980 | RIAJ (physical): Platinum | The Best |
| 10 | "Natsu no Ōsama" (夏の王様; "Summer King") | June 21, 2000 | 1 | — | — | — | — | 874,827 | RIAJ (physical): 2× Platinum | D Album |
| 10 | "Mō Kimi Igai Aisenai" (もう君以外愛せない; "I Can't Love Else Anymore") | June 21, 2000 | 1 | — | — | — | — | 874,827 | RIAJ (physical): 2× Platinum | D Album |
| 11 | "Boku no Senaka ni wa Hane ga Aru" (ボクの背中には羽根がある; "There Are Wings on Your Back") | February 7, 2001 | 1 | — | — | — | — | 919,560 | RIAJ (physical): 2× Platinum | E Album |
| 12 | "Jōnetsu" (情熱; "Passion") | May 25, 2001 | 1 | — | — | — | — | 595,015 | RIAJ (physical): Platinum | E Album |
| 13 | "Hey! Minna Genki Kai?" (Hey! みんな元気かい?; "Hey! Is Everyone Good?") | November 14, 2001 | 1 | — | — | — | — | 418,690 | RIAJ (physical): Platinum | F Album |
| 14 | "Kanashimi Blue" (カナシミ ブルー; "Sadness Blue") | May 1, 2002 | 1 | — | — | — | — | 329,610 | RIAJ (physical): Platinum | F Album |
| 15 | "Solitude (Hontō no Sayonara)" (真実のサヨナラ; "Real Goodbye") | October 23, 2002 | 1 | — | — | — | — | 328,362 | RIAJ (physical): Platinum | F Album |
| 16 | "Eien no Bloods" (永遠のBLOODS; "Eternal Blood") | April 9, 2003 | 1 | — | — | — | — | 362,497 | RIAJ (physical): Platinum | G Album |
| 17 | "Kokoro ni Yume o Kimi ni wa Ai o" (心に夢を君には愛を; "Put Love in Your Heart as a Dream") | June 18, 2003 | 1 | — | — | — | — | 300,609 | RIAJ (physical): Platinum | G Album |
| 17 | "Gira Gira" (ギラ☆ギラ; "Glaring") | June 18, 2003 | 1 | — | — | — | — | 300,609 | RIAJ (physical): Platinum | KinKi Single Selection II |
| 18 | "Hakka Candy" (薄荷キャンディー; "Mint Candy") | August 13, 2003 | 1 | — | — | — | — | 388,024 | RIAJ (physical): Platinum | G Album |
| 19 | "Ne, Gambaru yo" (ね、がんばるよ。; "Hey, Keep Going") | January 15, 2004 | 1 | — | — | — | — | 326,791 | RIAJ (physical): Platinum | KinKi Single Selection II |
| 20 | "Anniversary" | December 22, 2004 | 1 | — | — | — | — | 525,901 | RIAJ (physical): 2× Platinum | H Album: Hand |
| 21 | "Veludo no Yami" (ビロードの闇; "Velvet Darkness") | June 15, 2005 | 1 | — | — | — | — | 319,120 | RIAJ (physical): Platinum | H Album: Hand |
| 22 | "Snow! Snow! Snow!" | December 21, 2005 | 1 | — | — | — | — | 318,035 | RIAJ (physical): Platinum | I Album: ID |
| 23 | "Natsu Moyō" (夏模様; "Summer Pattern") | July 27, 2006 | 1 | — | — | — | — | 310,516 | RIAJ (physical): Platinum | I Album: ID |
| 24 | "Harmony of December" | November 29, 2006 | 1 | — | — | — | — | 300,338 | RIAJ (physical): Platinum | I Album: ID |
| 25 | "Brand New Song" | April 25, 2007 | 1 | — | — | — | — | 223,332 | RIAJ (physical): Platinum | Phi |
| 26 | "Eien ni" (永遠に; "Forever") | September 12, 2007 | 1 | — | — | — | — | 229,746 | RIAJ (physical): Platinum | Phi |
| 27 | "Secret Code" | August 27, 2008 | 1 | — | 1 | 9 | 2 | 224,608 | RIAJ (physical): Platinum | J Album |
| 28 | "Yakusoku" (約束; "Promise") | January 28, 2009 | 1 | — | 1 | 11 | 2 | 210,510 | RIAJ (physical): Gold | J Album |
| 29 | "Swan Song" (スワンソング, Suwan Songu) | October 28, 2009 | 1 | — | 1 | 13 | 5 | 187,412 | RIAJ (physical): Gold | J Album |
| 30 | "Family (Hitotsu ni Naru Koto)" (Family ～ひとつになること; "Becoming One") | December 1, 2010 | 1 | — | 1 | 16 | 2 | 190,932 | RIAJ (physical): Gold | K Album |
| 31 | "Time" | June 15, 2011 | 1 | — | 1 | 9 | 4 | 171,068 | RIAJ (physical): Gold | K Album |
| 32 | "Kawatta Katachi no Ishi" (変わったかたちの石; "Misshapen Stone") | January 11, 2012 | 1 | — | 1 | 9 | 2 | 147,508 | RIAJ (physical): Gold | L Album |
| 33 | "Mada Namida ni Naranai Kanashimi ga" (まだ涙にならない悲しみが; "Sadness Still Not Used to Tears") | October 23, 2013 | 1 | — | 1 | 8 | 1 | 204,245 | RIAJ (physical): Gold | L Album |
| 33 | "Koi wa Nioe to Chirinuru o" (恋は匂へと散りぬるを; "Even Fragrant Love Will Scatter") | October 23, 2013 | 1 | — | — | 8 | 1 | 204,245 | RIAJ (physical): Gold | L Album |
| 34 | "Kagi no Nai Hako" (鍵のない箱; "Box Without a Key") | November 12, 2014 | 1 | — | 1 | 4 | 1 | 173,191 | RIAJ (physical): Gold | M Album |
| 35 | "Yume wo Mireba Kizutsuku Koto mo aru" (夢を見れば傷つくこともある; "Dreaming Sometimes Hurts You") | November 18, 2015 | 1 | — | 2 | — | — | 173,634 | RIAJ (physical): Gold | N Album |
| 36 | "Bara to Taiyou" (薔薇と太陽; "Rose and Sun") | July 20, 2016 | 1 | — | — | — | — | 211,800 | RIAJ (physical): Gold | N Album |
| 37 | "Michi wa Tezukara Yume no Hana" (道は手ずから夢の花; "Dream Flowers by Hand") | November 2, 2016 | 1 | — | — | — | — | 191,290 | RIAJ (physical): Gold | Ballad Selection |
| 38 | "The Red Light" | July 12, 2017 | 1 | — | — | — | — | 217,701 | RIAJ (physical): Gold | The Best |
| 39 | "Topaz Love/Destiny" | January 24, 2018 | 1 | — | 1 | — | — | 220,268 | RIAJ (physical): Gold | O Album |
| 40 | "Aitai, Aitai, Aenai." (会いたい、会いたい、会えない。; "I want to see you, I want to see you, but I can't") | December 19, 2018 | 1 | 1 | 1 | — | — | 197,475 | RIAJ (physical): Gold | O Album |
| 41 | "Hikari no Kehai" (光の気配; "Sign of Light") | December 4, 2019 | 1 | 1 | 1 | — | — | 188,856 | RIAJ (physical): Gold | O Album |
| 42 | "Kanzai Boya" | June 17, 2020 | 1 | 1 | — | — | — | 200,989 | RIAJ (physical): Gold | O Album |
| 43 | "Ampere" | July 21, 2021 | 1 | 1 | — | — | — | | | P Album |
| 44 | "Kojyundo Romance" | March 16, 2022 | 1 | 1 | — | — | — | 165,432 | | P Album |
| 45 | "Amazing Love" | July 27, 2022 | 1 | 1 | 2 | — | — | 235,030 | | P Album |
| 46 | "The Story of Us" | January 18, 2023 | 1 | 1 | — | — | — | 173,102 | | P Album |
| 47 | "Schrödinger" | December 27, 2023 | 1 | 1 | 4 | — | — | | | 39 Very Much |
| 48 | "Ai no Katamari" | December 3, 2025 | — | — | 3 | — | — | | RIAJ (streaming): Gold | 39 Very Much |
As Domoto
| 49 | "Matane" | May 5, 2026 | 1 | — | 3 | — | — | 154,137 | RIAJ (physical): Gold | TBA |

=== Promotional singles ===
| Title | Year | Peak chart positions | Album |
| Title | Year | Billboard Japan Hot 100 (Note: Sources for chart positions are as follows: "Negau Ijō no Koto Inoru Ijō no Koto", "Speed", "Muku no Hane".) | Album |
|---|---|---|---|
| "Negau Ijō no Koto Inoru Ijō no Koto" (願う以上のこと祈る以上のこと; "More than Wishing, More than Praying") | 2011 | 26 | K Album |
| "Speed" (スピード, Supīdo) | 2013 | 60 | L Album |
| "Muku no Hane" (むくのはね; "Wings of Purity") | 2013 | 76 | L Album |

== Video albums ==
List of media, with selected chart positions
| | Title | Album details | Peak positions | Certifications |
| | Title | Album details | JPN | Certifications |
|---|---|---|---|---|
| 1 | KiNKi KiDS with 35-mannin Fan Seiki no Live (KiNKi KiDS with 35万人ファン 世紀のLIVE; "Kinki Kids with 350,000 Fans: Live of an Era") | Released: July 23, 1995; Label: Johnny's; Formats: VHS | — | |
| 2 | KinKi Kids '96 1996.1.13 Yoyogi White Theater | Fanclub exclusive; Released: April 19, 1996; Label: Johnny's; Formats: VHS | — | |
| 3 | KinKi Kids '97 Lawson Presents | Exclusively sold at Lawson convenience stores; Released: June 12, 1997; Label: Johnny's; Formats: VHS | — | |
| 4 | Us | Released: May 20, 1998; Label: Johnny's; Formats: DVD, VHS | 23 (Note: 2007 DVD re-release position.) | |
| 5 | KinKi Kids 3 Days Panic! at Tokyo Dome '98–'99 | Released: April 21, 1999; Label: Johnny's; Formats: DVD, VHS | 16 (Note: 2007 DVD re-release position.) | |
| 6 | KinKi Kiss Single Selection 1 | Music video collection; Released: April 25, 2001; Label: Johnny's; Formats: VHS | — | |
| 6 | KinKi Kiss Single Selection 2 | Music video collection; Released: April 25, 2001; Label: Johnny's; Formats: VHS | — | |
| 6 | Kinki Kiss Single Selection | Compilation of Selection 1 and Selection 2.; Released: May 9, 2001; Label: Johnny's; Formats: DVD | 1 | |
| 7 | Fēngyún Zàiqǐ Jìnjī Xiǎozi 2001 Táiběi Yǎnchàng Huì: KinKi Kids Returns! 2001 Concert Tour in Taipei (風雲再起近畿小子2001台北演唱會) | Released: September 5, 2001; Label: Johnny's; Formats: DVD, VHS | 1 | |
| 8 | -Ism | Live clip and music video collection for E album.; Released: January 9, 2002; Label: Johnny's; Formats: DVD, VHS | 1 | |
| 9 | KinKi Kids Dome F Concert: Fun Fan Forever | Released: December 3, 2003; Label: Johnny's; Formats: DVD | 1 | RIAJ: Gold |
| 10 | KinKi Kiss 3 Single Selection | Released: July 14, 2004; Label: Johnny's; Formats: VHS | — | |
| 10 | KinKi Kiss 2 Single Selection | Released: July 14, 2004; Label: Johnny's; Formats: DVD | 1 | RIAJ: Gold |
| 11 | KinKi Kids Dome Tour 2004-2005: Font De Anniversary. | Released: August 3, 2005; Label: Johnny's; Formats: DVD | 1 | RIAJ: Gold |
| 12 | We are φn' 39!! and U? Kinki Kids Live in Dome 07-08 | Released: June 18, 2008; Label: Johnny's; Formats: DVD | 1 | RIAJ: Gold |
| 13 | KinKi You | Released: September 30, 2009; Label: Johnny's; Formats: DVD | 2 | RIAJ: Gold |
| 14 | KinKi Kids Concert Tour J | Released: August 11, 2010; Label: Johnny's; Formats: DVD, Blu-ray | 1 | RIAJ: Gold |
| 15 | KinKi Kids 2010-2011: Kimi mo Dōmoto Family (君も堂本FAMILY; "You're in the Domoto Family Too") | Released: July 27, 2011; Label: Johnny's; Formats: DVD, Blu-ray | 1 | RIAJ: Gold |
| 16 | King KinKi Kids 2011-2012 | Released: July 18, 2012; Label: Johnny's; Formats: DVD, Blu-ray | 1 | RIAJ: Gold |
| 17 | KinKi Kids Concert: Thank You for 15 Years 2012-2013 | Released: August 7, 2013; Label: Johnny's; Formats: DVD, Blu-ray | 1 | |
| 18 | KinKi Kids Concert 2013-2014 [L] | Released: October 22, 2014; Label: Johnny's; Formats: DVD, Blu-Ray | 1 | |
| 19 | KinKi Kids Concert [Memories & Moments] | Released: August 26, 2015; Label: Johnny's; Formats: DVD, Blu-Ray | 1 | |
| 20 | 2015-2016 Concert KinKi Kids | Released: August 10, 2016; Label: Johnny's; Formats: DVD, Blu-Ray | 1 | RIAJ: Gold |
| 21 | We are KinKi Kids Dome Concert 2016-2017 TSUYOSHI & YOU & KOICHI | Released on: July 12, 2017; Label: Johnny's; Formats: DVD, Blu-Ray | 1 | RIAJ: Gold |
| 22 | MTV Unplugged: KinKi Kids | Released on: April 11, 2018; Label: Johnny's; Formats: DVD, Blu-Ray | 1 | |
| 23 | KinKi Kids CONCERT 20.2.21 -Everything happens for a reason- | Released on: July 25, 2018; Label: Johnny's; Formats: DVD, Blu-Ray | 1 | RIAJ: Gold |
| 24 | KinKi Kids Concert Tour 2019-2020 ThanKs 2 YOU | Released on: November 11, 2020; Label: Johnny's; Formats: DVD, Blu-Ray | 1 | |
| 25 | KinKi Kids O Shōgatsu Concert 2021 (KinKi Kids O正月コンサート2021; "KinKi Kids O Japanese New Year Concert 2021") | Released on: April 28, 2021; Label: Johnny's; Formats: DVD, Blu-Ray | 1 | RIAJ: Gold |
