= KinKi Single Selection II =

Greatest hits album by KinKi Kids
- Released: December 22, 2004
- Genre: Pop
- Length: 63:03
- Label: Johnny's Entertainment

KinKi Kids chronology
G Album: 24/7 (2003)	KinKi Single Selection II (2004)	H Album: Hand (2005)

Singles from KinKi Single Selection II
- 1. "Kanashimi Blue" Released: May 2, 2002; 2. "Ne, Ganbaru Yo" Released: January 15, 2004

KinKi Single Selection II is the second greatest hits album by Japanese duo KinKi Kids. The album was released on December 22, 2004 and debuted at the top of the Oricon charts, selling 356,117 copies in its first week and 544,594 copies by the end of 2005 as it was counted for the 2005 Oricon year (December 6, 2004 to November 28, 2005). It was certified Double Platinum by RIAJ.

== Track list ==
CD
No.	Title	Lyrics	Music	Length
1.	"Natsu no Ōsama" (from album D Album)	Chinka Ko (康珍化)	Ichirō Hada (羽田一郎)	4:49
2.	"Mō Kimi Igai Aisenai" (from album D Album)	Canna	Canna	4:59
3.	"Boku no Senaka ni wa Hane ga Aru" (from album E Album)	Takashi Matsumoto (松本 隆)	Tetsurō Oda (織田哲郎)	4:16
4.	"Jōnetsu" (from album E Album)	Satomi	Boris Durdevic	4:47
5.	"Hey! Minna Genki Kai?" (from album F Album)	Yo-King	Yo-King	4:49
6.	"Ai no Katamari"	Tsuyoshi Domoto	Koichi Domoto	4:48
7.	"Kanashimi Blue"	Kohei Dojima (堂島孝平)	Dojima	5:11
8.	"Solitude: Shinjitsu no Sayonara" (from album F Album)	K.Dino	K.Dino	5:33
9.	"Eien no Bloods" (from album G Album: 24/7)	Shinichi Asada (浅田信一)	Dojima	5:04
10.	"Kokoro ni Yume wo Kimi ni wa Ai wo" (from album G Album: 24/7)	Satomi	Ryoki Matsumoto	5:24
11.	"Kira Kira" (ギラ☆ギラ)	Satomi	Akimitsu Honma (本間昭光)	4:16
12.	"Hakka Candy" (from album G Album: 24/7)	Takashi Matsumoto (松本 隆)	Fredrik Hult, Ola Larsson, Öystein Grindheim, Henning Harturng	4:37
13.	"Ne, Ganbaru Yo" (ね、がんばるよ。)	Miwa Yoshida (吉田美和)	Yoshida, Masato Nakamura (中村正人)	4:23
