= List of Oricon number-one albums of 2000 =

These are the Oricon number one albums of 2000, per the Oricon Albums Chart.

== Chart history ==
Key
†	Indicates best-selling album of 2000

Issue Date	Album	Sales	Artist(s)
January 3	Carry On My Way	567,190	Speed
January 17	Love Is The Message	1,349,650	Misia
January 24	Love Is The Message	173,870	Misia
January 31	Fresh Brash Old Man	161,780	Snail Ramp
February 7	Genius 2000	536,940	Namie Amuro
February 14	Genius 2000	141,070	Namie Amuro
February 21	Infinity Eighteen Vol. 1	825,130	Ami Suzuki
February 28	Greatest Hits "The Soul"	446,450	Dreams Come True
March 6	B'z The "Mixture"	1,101,440	B'z
March 13	Best: Psychommunity	407,600	Hide
March 20	Sakura no Ki no Shita	168,300	aiko
March 27	Eternity	554,570	Every Little Thing
April 3	Fresh	767,300	Judy and Mary
April 10	Shouso Strip	904,380	Ringo Sheena
April 17	Shouso Strip	724,060	Ringo Sheena
April 24	Shouso Strip	189,710	Ringo Sheena
May 1	Misia Remix 2000 Little Tokyo	234,190	Misia
May 8	Petit Best: Ki Ao Aka	385,680	Various Artists
May 15	Petit Best: Ki Ao Aka	211,300	Various Artists
May 22	Tubest III	250,650	Tube
May 29	KinKi Single Selection	712,340	KinKi Kids
June 5	Koyanagi the Covers Product 1	233,480	Yuki Koyanagi
June 12	Mayo Okamoto Best Rise I	233,480	Mayo Okamoto
June 19	Babylon	207,860	Sads
June 26	Rapunzel	185,590	Cocco
July 3	The Changing Same	381,180	Ken Hirai
July 10	Delicious Way †	2,218,640	Mai Kuraki
July 17	Delicious Way †	528,780	Mai Kuraki
July 24	Yuzuman no Natsu	368,270	Yuzu
July 31	Beat Ball	182,310	Da Pump
August 7	Mugendai	402,170	19
August 14	Super Eurobeat Vol.110 Millennium Anniversary Non-Stop Mega Mix	157,360	Various Artists
August 21	"Happy" Coming Century, 20th Century Forever	141,060	V6
August 28	Super Eurobeat Vol.110 Millennium Anniversary Non-Stop Mega Mix	104,180	Various Artists
September 4	Expansion	621,730	Yuki Koyanagi
September 11	Real	811,260	L'Arc-en-Ciel
September 18	Real	153,710	L'Arc-en-Ciel
September 25	Zecchōshū	275,920	Ringo Sheena
October 2	Image	88,190	Various Artists
October 9	Duty	1,682,760	Ayumi Hamasaki
October 16	Duty	339,810	Ayumi Hamasaki
October 23	Duty	205,180	Ayumi Hamasaki
October 30	Duty	116,970	Ayumi Hamasaki
November 6	Daiya-monde	274,150	Hitomi Yaida
November 13	Tobira	508,930	Yuzu
November 20	The History of Shogo Hamada "Since 1975"	424,600	Shōgo Hamada
November 27	1	469,220	The Beatles
December 4	Ballad 3 ~The Album of Love~	1,368,650	Southern All Stars
December 11	Drive~GLAY Complete Best~	1,726,780	Glay
December 18	Eleven	756,910	B'z
December 25	D Album	354,830	KinKi Kids

== Annual ==
- Number-one album of 2000: Declicious Way by Mai Kuraki.
- Most weeks at number-one: Ayumi Hamasaki and Ringo Sheena both with a total of 4 weeks.

== See also ==
- 2000 in music
