= List of Oricon number-one albums of 2005 =

These are the Oricon number one albums of 2005, per the Oricon Albums Chart.

== Chart history ==
Issue Date	Album	Sales	Artist(s)
January 3	KinKi Single Selection II	356,117	KinKi Kids
January 17	Perfect Best	970,126	Exile
January 24	Souvenir	175,815	Spitz
January 31	Ballad Best Singles: White Road	244,166	Glay
February 7	Hot Chemistry	104,856	Chemistry
February 14	Best of Soul	489,067	BoA
February 21	Early Times	201,354	Love Psychedelico
February 28	Early Times	90,341	Love Psychedelico
March 7	Joy	135,624	Yuki
March 14	Yume no Naka no Massugu na Michi	254,756	Aiko
March 21	Music	231,521	Mika Nakashima
March 28	Music	88,024	Mika Nakashima
April 4	Def Tech	75,346	Def Tech
April 11	Def Tech	82,459	Def Tech
April 18	The Circle	345,041	B'z
April 25	E: Complete A side Singles	98,362	Zone
May 2	Thumpx	215,219	Porno Graffitti
May 9	Touch	164,016	NEWS
May 16	Def Tech	99,236	Def Tech
May 23	Make Progress	92,154	Nami Tamaki
May 30	Def Tech	62,532	Def Tech
June 6	Don't Believe the Truth	95,026	Oasis
June 13	Ageha	76,514	W-inds
June 20	Home [1997~2000]	320,541	Yuzu
June 27	Sou Kana	171,026	Kazumasa Oda
July 4	Awake	225,137	L'Arc-en-Ciel
July 11	Ketsunopolis 4	947,826	Ketsumeishi
July 18	Ketsunopolis 4	308,057	Ketsumeishi
July 25	Ketsunopolis 4	220,916	Ketsumeishi
August 1	Kūsō Clip	146,180	Sukima Switch
August 8	Sample Bang!	285,236	SMAP
August 15	One	121,187	Arashi
August 22	DiscO-Zone	44,440	O-Zone
August 29	DiscO-Zone	66,761	O-Zone
September 5	Beat Space Nine	140,823	M-Flo
September 12	Good Job!	350,054	Rip Slyme
September 19	Rio de Emocion	93,258	Dragon Ash
September 26	Have a Nice Day	123,410	Bon Jovi
October 3	I ♥ U	686,688	Mr. Children
October 10	Best ~First Things~	195,290	Kumi Koda
October 17	Killer Street	633,490	Southern All Stars
October 24	Иatural	510,473	Orange Range
October 31	Иatural	165,752	Orange Range
November 7	#1's	154,859	Destiny's Child
November 14	Kidō Senshi Gundam SEED Destiny Complete Best	194,233	Various Artists
November 21	Japana-rhythm	178,919	Bennie K
November 28	H Album: Hand	245,681	KinKi Kids
December 5	10th Anniversary Complete Single Collection '95-'05 "Utabaka"	927,989	Ken Hirai
December 12	B'z The Best "Pleasure II"	761,940	B'z
December 19	Best	480,097	Mika Nakashima
December 26	Love Cook	334,812	Ai Otsuka

== Trivia ==
- Number-one album of 2005: MusiQ by Orange Range.
- Most weeks at number-one: Def Tech with a total of 4 weeks.

== See also ==
- 2005 in music
