= Tsuyoshi Domoto discography =

- Studio albums: 13
- EPs: 1
- Compilation albums: 1
- Singles: 13
- Video albums: 15
- Cover albums: 1

Japanese singer and songwriter Tsuyoshi Domoto has released thirteen studio albums, fifteen video albums, one compilation album, one cover album, one EP, and thirteen singles. His career began as a member of KinKi Kids. Domoto's first studio album, Rosso e Azzurro (2002), peaked at number one on the Oricon Albums Chart.

== Albums ==
=== Studio albums ===
List of studio albums, with selected chart positions, sales figures and certifications
Title	Album details	Peak chart positions				Sales	Certifications
Title	Album details	JPN	JPN Hot	TWN (Note: The G-Music chart was established in July 2005 and only archives the top 20 releases.)	TWN EA (Note: Sources for chart positions are as follows: Rosso e Azzurro, Coward, Neo Africa Rainbow Ax 2007 week 17, I and Ai 2008 week 16, Bigaku 2009 week 17, Shamanippon: Rakachi no Tohi 2012 week 17, Shamanippon: Roi no Chinoi 2014 week 11, Hybrid Funk 2018 week 24, Naralien 2019 week 38, Love Faders 2020 week 30, Go To Funk 2021 week 41.)	Sales	Certifications
Rosso e Azzurro	Released: 7 August 2002; Label: Johnny's Entertainment; Format: CD	1	—	—	16	JPN: 228,000	RIAJ: Gold
Si	Released: 18 August 2004; Label: Johnny's Entertainment; Format: CD, CD/DVD	1	—	—	—	JPN: 161,000	RIAJ: Gold
Coward (Note: As ENDLICHERI☆ENDLICHERI)	Released: 1 February 2006; Label: Johnny's Entertainment; Format: CD, CD/DVD	1	—	19	5	JPN: 117,000	RIAJ: Gold
Neo Africa Rainbow Ax	Released: 11 April 2007; Label: Rainbow Endli9; Format: CD, CD/DVD	2	—	13	2	JPN: 98,000	RIAJ: Gold
I and Ai (Note: As 244 ENDLI-x)	Released: 2 April 2008; Label: Rainbow Endli9; Format: CD, 2CD, CD/DVD	4	—	9	2	JPN: 101,000	RIAJ: Gold
Bigaku: My Beautiful Sky (Note: As Tsuyoshi)	Released: 10 April 2009; Label: Bigaku Records; Format: CD	3	—	7	2	JPN: 80,000	
Shamanippon: Rakachi no Tohi	Released: 11 April 2012; Label: Shamanippon; Format: 2CD, 2CD/DVD	1	—	9	4	JPN: 72,000	
Shamanippon: Roi no Chinoi	Released: 12 February 2014; Label: Shamanippon; Format: CD, CD/DVD	1	—	8	2	JPN: 51,000	
Tu	Released: 20 May 2015; Label: Shamanippon; Format: CD, LP	1	14	—	1	JPN: 59,000	
Hybrid Funk (Note: As ENDRECHERI)	Released: 2 May 2018; Label: Rainbow Endli9; Format: CD, CD/DVD	1	1	—	3	JPN: 87,000	RIAJ: Gold
Naralien	Released: 14 August 2019; Label: Rainbow Endli9; Format: CD, CD/DVD	1	1	—	1	JPN: 61,000	
Love Faders	Released 17 June 2020; Label: Rainbow Endli9; Format: CD, CD/DVD	1	1	—	1	JPN: 57,000	
Go To Funk	Released 25 August 2021; Label: Rainbow Endli9; Format: CD, CD/DVD, CD/Blu-ray	1	1	—	1	JPN: 54,000	
"—" denotes a recording that did not chart or was not released in that territory.

=== Cover albums ===
List of cover albums, with selected chart positions, sales figures and certifications
Title	Album details	Peaks			Sales	Certifications
Title	Album details	JPN	TWN (Note: Position was taken from 2013 week 21.)	TWN EA	Sales	Certifications
Kaba	Released: 8 May 2013; Label: Johnny's Entertainment; Format: CD, CD/DVD	1	7	1	JPN: 77,000	RIAJ: Gold

=== Compilation albums ===
List of compilation albums
Title	Album details
Nippon	Released: 21 October 2011; Label: Gan-Shin; Format: CD

== Extended plays ==
List of extended plays, with selected chart positions and sales figures
Title	Album details	Peaks		Sales
Title	Album details	JPN	JPN Hot	Sales
Grateful Rebirth	Released: 8 June 2016; Label: Shamanippon; Format: CD, CD/DVD	1	1	JPN: 40,000
"—" denotes a recording that did not chart.

== Singles ==
List of singles, with selected chart positions, sales figures and certifications
Title	Year	Peak chart positions				Sales	Certifications	Album
Title	Year	JPN	JPN Hot (Note: The Japan Hot 100 chart was established in February 2008.) (Note: Sources for chart positions are as follows: "Kurikaesu Haru", "Sora", "Rain", "Eni o Yuite", "Niji no Uta", "Mabataki", "One More Purple Funk (Kōmei Katana)")	TWN	TWN EA (Note: Sources for chart positions are as follows: "Machi/Dekiai Logic"/"Waver"/"Yoshino Cherry"/"The Rainbow Star" 2017 week 37, "Sora ga Naku kara", "Kurikaesu Haru", "Sora (Utsukushii Ware no Sora)", "Rain", "Eni o Yuite", "Niji no Uta", "Mabataki".)	Sales	Certifications	Album
"Machi"	2002	1	—	—	20	JPN: 272,000	RIAJ: Gold	Rosso e Azzurro
"Dekiai Logic"	2002	1	—	—	20	JPN: 272,000	RIAJ: Gold	Rosso e Azzurro
"Waver"	2004	1	—	—	5	JPN: 214,000	RIAJ: Platinum	Si
"Yoshino Cherry"	2006	1	—	—	19	JPN: 164,000	RIAJ: Gold	Coward
"The Rainbow Star"	2006	1	—	—	4	JPN: 138,000	RIAJ: Gold	Non-album single
"Sora ga Naku kara"	2007	1	—	—	15	JPN: 128,000	RIAJ: Gold	Neo Africa Rainbow Ax
"Kurikaesu Haru"	2008	2	1	—	15	JPN: 94,000	RIAJ: Gold	Non-album singles
"Sora (Utsukushii Ware no Sora)"	2009	1	2	—	4	JPN: 63,000		Non-album singles
"Rain"	2009	2	3	—	6	JPN: 63,000		Non-album singles
"Eni o Yuite"	2011	2	3	11	2	JPN: 112,000	RIAJ: Gold	Shamanippon: Rakachi no Tohi
"Niji no Uta"	2011	2	1	10	1	JPN: 90,000	RIAJ: Gold	Non-album single
"Mabataki"	2013	1	1	11	1	JPN: 95,000	RIAJ: Gold	Shamanippon: Roi no Chinoi
"Panties ga Dashitainda Doshitemo"	2014	—	—	—	—			Non-album singles
"One More Purple Funk... (Kōmei Katana)"	2018	1	4	—	—	JPN: 73,000		Non-album singles
"—" denotes a recording that did not chart or was not released in that territory.

=== Promotional singles ===
List of promotional singles, with selected chart positions
Title	Year	Peak	Album
Title	Year	JPN Hot (Note: Sources for chart positions are as follows: "Sunday Morning", "I Love You", "Ginger.")	Album
"Original Color"	2004	—	Si
"Koi no Kamaitachi"	2004	—	Si
"Kokoro no Blind"	2004	—	Si
"Sunday Morning"	2009	19	"Rain" (single)
"Shamanippon (Kuni no Uta)"	2012	—	Shamanippon: Rakachi no Tohi
"I Love You"	2013	43	Kaba
"Ginger"	2014	52	Shamanippon: Roi no Chinoi
"—" denotes a recording that did not chart.

== Videoography ==
=== Videos ===
List of concert videos, with selected chart positions and certifications
Title	Video details	Peaks		Certifications
Title	Video details	JPN DVD	JPN BD	Certifications
Live Rosso e Azzurro	Released: 8 January 2003; Label: Johnny's Entertainment; Format: DVD, VHS	1	—	
Tsuyoshi Domoto 2nd Live Si: First Line	Released: 6 April 2005; Label: Johnny's Entertainment; Format: DVD, VHS	1	—	RIAJ: Gold
Mikansei Funky White Dragon	Released: 14 March 2007; Label: Johnny's Entertainment; Format: DVD	2	—	
Endlicheri Live DVD	Released: 11 March 2009; Label: Johnny's Entertainment; Format: DVD	3	—	
Yakushi-ji	Released: 30 June 2010; Label: Johnny's Entertainment; Format: 2DVD, 2DVD/CD	1	—	
Domoto Tsuyoshi Heian Jingū Kōen 2011: Gentei Tokubetsu Jōei Heianyuki	Released: 22 August 2012; Label: Johnny's Entertainment; Format: 2DVD, Blu-ray	1	4	
Shamanippon: Rakachi no Tohi	Released: 12 June 2013; Label: Johnny's Entertainment; Format: 2DVD, Blu-ray	1	20	
Heian Jingū Live 2012 Himitsu	Released: 15 January 2014; Label: Johnny's Entertainment; Format: DVD, Blu-ray	1	20	
Heian Jingū Live 2012 Heian Funk	Released: 20 August 2014; Label: Johnny's Entertainment; Format: DVD, Blu-ray	9	7	
Tu Funk Tuor 2015	Released: 8 June 2016; Label: Johnny's Entertainment; Format: DVD, Blu-ray	3	3	
Domoto Tsuyoshi Tōdai-ji Live 2018	Released: 10 April 2019; Label:Johnny's Entertainment; Format: DVD, Blu-ray	1	1	
Endrecheri Tsuyoshi Domoto Live Tour 2018	Released: 25 September 2019; Label: Johnny's Entertainment; Format: DVD, Blu-ray	4	3	
Domoto Tsuyoshi Kibō Heian Jingū Hōnō Ensō-shi 2014–2019	Released: 16 September 2020; Label: Johnny's Entertainment; Format: DVD, Blu-ray	Only available at je-cp.com		
Endrecheri Tsuyoshi Domoto Live Tour 2019	Released: 27 January 2021; Label: Johnny's Entertainment; Format: DVD, Blu-ray	1	2	
Heian Jingū Hōnō Ensō Nijū Nijū	Released: 13 October 2021; Label: Johnny's Entertainment; Format: DVD, Blu-ray	5	5	
"—" denotes a recording that did not chart.

=== Documentaries ===
List of documentaries, with selected chart positions
Title	Video details	Peak
Title	Video details	JPN
Mune Uchū Endlicheri Endlicheri Documentary	Released: 14 February 2007; Label: Johnny's Entertainment; Format: DVD	1

=== Television series ===
List of media, with selected chart positions
Title	Video details	Peak
Title	Video details	JPN
24 Channel Vol. 1	Released: 23 February 2011; Label: Johnny's Entertainment; Format: DVD	3
24 Channel Vol. 2	Released: 23 February 2011; Label: Johnny's Entertainment; Format: DVD	5
24 Channel Vol. 3	Released: 23 February 2011; Label: Johnny's Entertainment; Format: DVD	4
