= G Album: 24/7 =

Studio album by KinKi Kids
- Released: October 22, 2003
- Genre: J-pop
- Length: 63:36
- Labels: Johnny's Entertainment; JECN-0043 (Limited edition); JECN-0044 (Regular edition)

KinKi Kids chronology
| F Album (2002) | G Album: 24/7 (2003) | KinKi Single Selection II (2004) |

Singles from G Album: 24/7
- 1. "Eien no Bloods" Released: April 9, 2003; 2. "Kokoro Ni Yume Wo Kimi Niwa Ai Wo" Released: June 18, 2003; 3. "Hakka Candy" Released: August 13, 2003

G Album: 24/7 is the seventh studio album of the Japanese duo KinKi Kids. It was released on October 22, 2003 and debuted at the top of the Oricon charts, selling 242,826 copies in its first week. The album was certified platinum by the RIAJ for 250,000 copies shipped to stores in Japan.

== Track listing ==
CD
| No. | Title | Lyrics | Music | Length |
|---|---|---|---|---|
| 1. | "Bonnie Butterfly" | Kōji Ide (井手コウジ) | Ide | 4:22 |
| 2. | "Eien no Bloods" (永遠のBLOODS, G-mix) | Shinichi Asada (浅田信一) | Kohei Dojima | 5:01 |
| 3. | "Destination" | Gajin | Gajin | 4:50 |
| 4. | "Sekai Jyu U no Minade" (世界中のみんなで…。) | Shūmizu (周水) | Shūmizu | 4:44 |
| 5. | "Kuroi Asa・Shiroi Yoru" (黒い朝・白い夜 Black Morning・White Night, Tsuyoshi Domoto solo) | Dojima | Dojima | 4:28 |
| 6. | "Kienai Kanashimi Kesenai Kioku" (消えない悲しみ 消せない記憶, Koichi Domoto solo) | Koichi Domoto | Koichi Domoto | 4:34 |
| 7. | "Hakka Candy" (薄荷キャンディー) | Takashi Matsumoto (松本 隆) | Fredrik Hult, Ola Larsson, Öystein Grindheim, Henning Harturng | 4:35 |
| 8. | "Another Christmas" | Yōji Kubota (久保田洋司) | Larry Forsberg, Sven-Inge Sjoberg, Lennart Wasttesson | 4:39 |
| 9. | "Virtual Reality" (Koichi Domoto solo) | Double S | Ryoki Matsumoto (松本良喜) | 5:14 |
| 10. | "Orange" (Tsuyoshi Domoto solo) | Tsuyoshi Domoto | Tsuyoshi Domoto | 5:58 |
| 11. | "Teiden no Yoru ni Wa: On the Night of a Blackout" (停電の夜には －On the night of a blackout－) | Yasushi Akimoto (秋元 康) | Mats MP Persson, Christer Schill | 5:00 |
| 12. | "Dragon Road" (どらごん・ろ～ど) | Satomi | Ryoki Matsumoto | 4:59 |
| 13. | "Kokoro Ni Yume Wo Kimi Niwa Ai Wo" (心に夢を君には愛を) | Satomi | Ryoki Matsumoto | 5:21 |
