= Phi (KinKi Kids album) =

Studio album by KinKi Kids
- Released: November 14, 2007
- Genre: Pop
- Length: 52:35 (Limited edition); 57:47 (Regular edition)
- Label: Johnny's Entertainment

KinKi Kids chronology
39 (2007)	Phi (2007)	J Album (2009)

Singles from Phi
- 1. "Brand New Song" Released: April 25, 2007; 2. "Eien Ni" Released: September 12, 2007

Phi (stylized as Φ) is the tenth studio album of the Japanese duo KinKi Kids. It is the first album by KinKi Kids to have a Greek-lettered title, rather than the traditional Latin-lettered album title. The album was certified platinum by the RIAJ for 250,000 copies shipped to stores in Japan.

== Track listing ==
CD
No.	Title	Lyrics	Music	Length
1.	"Love in the Phi"	Takahiro Maeda (前田たかひろ)	U-Key Zone	3:52
2.	"Namida, Hitohira"	Kōji Ide (井手コウジ)	Ide	4:12
3.	"Snapshot"	Satomi	Tetsuro Oda (織田哲郎)	4:33
4.	"The Edge of the Word"	Benimatsu Kuririn (紅茉來鈴)	Kuririn	4:50
5.	"Rhapsody" (Regular edition only)	Narumi Kazuto (成海カズト)	Kazuto	5:12
6.	"Kaze no Iro"	Yasushi Akimoto (秋元 康)	Noriyasu Agematsu (上松範康)	4:51
7.	"Lose Control" (Koichi Domoto solo)	Hiro	Hiro	3:24
8.	"Since 1997"	Toshinori Yonekura (米倉利紀)	Yonekura	4:49
9.	"Unchanged." (Tsuyoshi Domoto solo)	Kuririn	Daichi (大智)	3:33
10.	"Brand New Song"	Gajin	Gajin	4:25
11.	"Giniro Angou"	Tsuyoshi Domoto	Koichi Domoto	5:15
12.	"No Chūndo"	Hiroki Nagase (長瀬弘樹)	Nagase	4:24
13.	"Eien, Ni"	Satomi	Hideaki Tokunaga (德永英明)	4:27

== Charts ==
Chart (2007)	Peak position	Certification (threshold)
Japan Oricon album Weekly Chart	1	Platinum
