= F Album =

Studio album by KinKi Kids
- Released: December 26, 2002
- Genre: J-pop
- Length: 59:47
- Label: Johnny's Entertainment; JECN-0034 (Limited edition); JECN-0035 (Regular edition)

KinKi Kids chronology
E Album (2001)	F Album (2002)	G Album: 24/7 (2003)

Singles from F album
- 1. "Hey! Minna Genki Kai?" Released: November 14, 2001; 2. "Kanashimi Blue" Released: May 2, 2002; 3. "Solitude: Shinjitsu no Sayonara" Released: October 23, 2002

F Album is the sixth studio album of the Japanese duo KinKi Kids. It was released on December 26, 2002 and debuted at number two on the Oricon charts, selling 360,102 copies in its first week. The album was certified platinum by the RIAJ for 400,000 copies shipped to stores in Japan.

== Track listing ==
CD
No.	Title	Lyrics	Music	Length
1.	"Rūretto Taun no Natsu"	Atsushi Yanaka (谷中敦)	Akio Shimizu (清水昭男)	4:41
2.	"Solitude: Hontō no Sayonara" (New edit)	K.Dino	K.Dino	5:39
3.	"Raibaru"	Hirō Ooyagi (オオヤギヒロオ)	Ooyagi	5:15
4.	"Fuyu no Pengin"	Ryoichi Higuchi (樋口了一)	Higuchi	4:45
5.	"Winter Kill" (Tsuyoshi Domoto solo)	Tsuyoshi Domoto	Tsuyoshi Domoto	6:07
6.	"Harukanauta"	Hanako Ise (伊勢華子)	Takashi Yanaka (谷中たかし)	4:28
7.	"Hira-Hira"	Tsuyoshi Domoto	Tsuyoshi Domoto	4:34
8.	"Tsukiyo no Monogatari" (Koichi Domoto solo)	Koichi Domoto	Koichi Domoto	5:00
9.	"Ai No Katamari" (Acoustic version)	Tsuyoshi Domoto	Koichi Domoto	4:26
10.	"Hey! Minna Genki Kai?"	Yo-King	Yo-King	4:49
11.	"Tenohira"	Shinichi Asada (浅田信一)	Ooyagi	5:04
12.	"Kanashimi Blue" (New mix)	Kohei Dojima	Dojima	5:07
