= I Album: ID =

Studio album by KinKi Kids
- Released: December 13, 2006
- Genre: J-pop, folk pop
- Length: 57:29 (Limited edition); 62:18 (Regular edition)
- Label: Johnny's Entertainment; JECN-0117/118 (CD-DVD Limited edition); JECN-0119 (Regular edition)

KinKi Kids chronology
H Album: Hand (2005)	I Album: ID (2006)	39 (2007)

Singles from I Album: ID
- 1. "Snow! Snow! Snow!" Released: December 21, 2005; 2. "Natsu Moyō" Released: July 26, 2006; 3. "Harmony of December" Released: November 29, 2006

I Album: ID (stylized as I album -iD-) is the ninth studio album of the Japanese duo KinKi Kids. It was released on December 13, 2006. The album was certified platinum by the RIAJ for 250,000 copies shipped to stores in Japan.

== Track listing ==
CD
No.	Title	Lyrics	Music	Length
1.	"Mafuyu no Panse" (真冬のパンセ)	Shinichi Asada (浅田信一)	Tomoki Ishizuka (石塚知生)	4:45
2.	"Aiiro no Yokaze" (藍色の夜風)	Kenji Ueda (上田ケンジ)	Akimitsu Honma (本間昭光)	3:34
3.	"Snow! Snow! Snow!"	Yasushi Akimoto (秋元 康)	Hiromasa Ijichi (伊秩弘将)	4:30
4.	"ID: The World of Gimmicks"	Ryūichi Shinozaki (篠崎隆一)	Daichi (大智), Makoto Miyazaki (宮崎 誠)	4:48
5.	"Love is the Mirage..." (Tsuyoshi Domoto solo)	Satomi	Ryoki Matsumoto (松本良喜)	5:00
6.	"Futari"	Koichi Domoto	Tsuyoshi Domoto	6:09
7.	"Get It On" (Koichi Domoto solo)	Yuhki Shirai (白井裕紀), Kaori Niimi (新美 香)	Kōji Ide (井手コウジ)	4:56
8.	"Black Joke"	Takahiro Maeda (前田たかひろ)	U-Ske	4:34
9.	"Natsu Moyō" (夏模様)	Satomi	Kenji Hayashida (林田健司)	5:15
10.	"Parental Advisory Explicit Content"	Satomi	Hayashida	4:20
11.	"Night+Flight"	Gajin	Gajin	4:37
12.	"Harmony of December"	Tatsurō Mashiko (マシコタツロウ)	Mashiko	5:00
13.	"Love is... Itsumo Soko ni Kimi ga Ita Kara" (Love is... ～いつもそこに君がいたから～)	Narumi Kazuto (成海カズト)	Kazuto	4:48
