= KinKi Single Selection =

Greatest hits album by KinKi Kids
- Released: May 17, 2000
- Genre: J-pop
- Length: 62:45
- Label: Johnny's Entertainment; JECN-0010

KinKi Kids chronology
C Album (1999)	KinKi Single Selection (2000)	KinKi Karaoke Single Selection (2000)

Singles from KinKi Single Selection
- 1. "Happy Happy Greeting/Cinderella Christmas" Released: December 9, 1998; 2. "Ame no Melody/To Heart" Released: October 6, 1999; 3. "Suki ni Natteku Aishiteku/KinKi no Yaru Ki Manman Song" Released: March 8, 2000

KinKi Single Selection is the first greatest hits album by Japanese duo KinKi Kids. The album was released on May 17, 2000 and debuted at the top of the Oricon charts, selling 712,340 copies in its first week. The album eventually went on to sell over 1,200,000 copies by the end of the year and was certified Million by RIAJ.

== Track list ==
CD
No.	Title	Lyrics	Music	Length
1.	"Theme of KinKi Kids '00"		Seikō Nagaoka (長岡成貢)
2.	"Garasu no Shōnen" (from album B Album)	Takashi Matsumoto (松本 隆)	Tatsuro Yamashita (山下達郎)
3.	"Aisareru yori Aishitai" (from album B Album)	Hiromi Mori (森浩 美)	Kōji Makaino (馬飼野康二)
4.	"Jet Coaster Romance" (from album B Album)	Matsumoto	Yamashita
5.	"Zenbu Dakishimete" (from album C Album)	Chinka Ko (康珍 化)	Takuro Yoshida (吉田拓郎)
6.	"Ao no Jidai" (from album C Album)	Canna	Canna
7.	"Happy Happy Greeting"	Matsumoto	Yamashita
8.	"Cinderella Christmas" (シンデレラ・クリスマス)	Matsumoto	Shin Tanimoto (谷本 新)
9.	"Yamenai de, Pure" (from album C Album)	Shizuka Ijyuin (伊集院静)	Kyohei Tsutsumi (筒美京平)
10.	"Flower" (from album C Album)	Hal	Hal, Nehi (音妃)
11.	"Ame no Melody" (雨のMelody)	Ko	Toshifumi Muto (武藤敏史), Hideaki Sakai (坂井秀陽)
12.	"To Heart"	Yōji Kubota (久保田洋司), E.Komatsu	Ayumi Miyazaki (宮崎 歩)
13.	"Suki ni Natteku Aishiteku" (好きになってく 愛してく)	Tsuyoshi Domoto	Koichi Domoto
