= Sushi Ōji! =

Japanese television series

Sushi Ōji! (Japanese: スシ王子!) is an original Japanese television drama series directed by Yukihiko Tsutsumi (堤幸彦) with main lead played by Domoto Koichi of KinKi Kids. It aired on Friday nights for a total of 8 episodes, from July 27 to September 14, 2007.

== Plot ==
Maizu Tsukasa was born to be the third generation successor of his family's sushi business. But his grandfather and father were killed during a fishing accident. Ten-year-old Tsukasa, who was also on the boat when the tragedy occurred, saw them speared by a giant swordfish. By chance, its eyes met Tsukasa's, leaving him with a phobia regarding fish eyes. Hence, Tsukasa was forced to give up sushi.

Fifteen years later, Tsukasa, who had taken up on Jinenryū (自然流), a form of martial arts modeled to mimic nature's life-forms, is once again thrown into the world of sushi when he learns that to perfect the Jirenryū is to be able to perfect sushi making (the kneading part) and vice versa. He is entrusted with a scroll on which are the directions to perfect the martial art.

On the way, Tsukasa learns that his mother, who had left him when he was young and whom he had thought was dead, is still alive and being held by a sushi organization which becomes his rival.

== Drama related ==
- A movie version of Sushi Ōji! set in New York City was released in 2008, in which Oji is horrified to find what Americans have done to sushi.
- The theme song of Sushi Ōji! is 「涙、ひとひら」 (Namida, Hitohira) by KinKi Kids
- This is the first drama in five years for Domoto Koichi
- Locations used as background in the drama include Okinawa, Tokyo, and Sendai

== Character Information ==
=== Main cast ===
- Domoto Koichi as Maizu Tsukasa (米寿司)

Whenever Tsukasa sees fish eyes, he points to the fish eyes and says「お前なんか、握ってやる！」(Omae nanka, nigitteyaru!) which means "I will crush you!"
Tsukasa's fish eye-phobia causes him to go berserk whenever he see them. Usually, his rage is aimed at the fish, but he also randomly attacks those around him as well. This is used as an advantage whenever Tsukasa gets into a fight that cannot be won easily

- Yuichi Nakamaru as Kawatarou (河原太郎)
