= C Album =

Studio album by KinKi Kids
- Released: August 4, 1999
- Genre: J-pop
- Length: 66:09
- Labels: Johnny's Entertainment; JECN-0007

KinKi Kids chronology
B Album (1998)	C Album (1999)	KinKi Single Selection (2000)

Singles from C album
- 1. "Zenbu Dakishimete/Ao no Jidai" Released: July 29, 1998; 2. "Yamenai de, Pure" Released: February 24, 1999; 3. "Flower" Released: May 26, 1999

C Album is the third studio album of the Japanese duo KinKi Kids. It was released on August 4, 1999, and debuted at the top of the Oricon charts, selling 451,230 copies in its first week. The album was certified double platinum by the RIAJ for 800,000 copies shipped to stores in Japan.

== Track listing ==
CD
No.	Title	Lyrics	Music	Length
1.	"It's All Right"	Kōji Ueno (上野浩司)	Takehiko Iida (飯田建彦)
2.	"Flying People'99" (ふらいんぐ・ぴーぷる'９９)	Masami Tozawa (戸沢暢美)	Iida
3.	"Kimi wa Naite Tsuyoku Naru" (キミは泣いてツヨくなる)	Taku Mitsui (三井 拓)	Makihiko Araki (荒木真樹彦)
4.	"Zenbu Dakishimete" (全部だきしめて)	Chinka Ko (康珍 化)	Takuro Yoshida (吉田拓郎)
5.	"Anotoki no Sora" (あのときの空)	Yoshihiko Chino (知野芳彦)	Chino
6.	"Peaceful World" (Koichi Domoto solo)	Koichi Domoto	Koichi Domoto
7.	"Yamenai de, Pure" (やめないで，Pure)	Shizuka Ijyuin (伊集院静)	Tsutsumi Kyohei (筒美京平)
8.	"Natural Thang"	Toshinori Yonekura (米倉利紀)	Yonekura
9.	"Flower" (フラワー)	Hal	Hal, Nehi (音妃)
10.	"Brand New Day"	Hidemi Yamamoto (山本英美)	Akihiko Kawakami (川上明彦)
11.	"Samazama na Ai" (さまざまな愛, Tsuyoshi Domoto solo)	Tsuyoshi Domoto	Tsuyoshi Domoto
12.	"Rocketman"	Takeshi Aida (相田 毅)	Susumu Nishikawa (西川 進)
13.	"Ao no Jidai" (青の時代)	Canna	Canna
