= 星願 =

星願, literally ‘Wish Upon a star’, may refer to:

- Fly Me to Polaris, 1999 Hong Kong romantic fantasy film
- I Will, studio album by Chinese singer Zhang Liyin
- Wish Upon a Star, 2004 Taiwanese television series starring Joseph Chang

== See also ==
- Hoshi ni Negai o (disambiguation)
- When You Wish Upon a Star (disambiguation)
- Wish Upon a Star (disambiguation)
