= Wish Upon a Star (disambiguation) =

Wish Upon a Star is a 1996 television film directed by Blair Treu.

Wish Upon a Star may also refer to:

- Wish Upon a Star, a 2004 Taiwanese television series starring Joseph Chang
- Wish Upon a Star: A Tribute to the Music of Walt Disney, a 2011 album
- Star in My Heart a.k.a. Wish Upon a Star, a 2010 South Korean MBC TV Series
- Wish upon a Star, a Thai television series
- "Wish Upon a Star", a 1977 song by Steve Miller Band from Book of Dreams

== See also ==
- Hoshi ni Negai o (disambiguation)
- When You Wish Upon a Star (disambiguation)
- 星願 (disambiguation)
