= E Album =

Studio album by KinKi Kids
- Released: July 25, 2001
- Genre: J-pop
- Length: 65:14
- Label: Johnny's Entertainment; JECN-0020

KinKi Kids chronology
D Album (2000)	E Album (2001)	F Album (2002)

Singles from E Album
- 1. "Boku no Senaka ni wa Hane ga Aru" Released: February 7, 2001; 2. "Jōnetsu" Released: May 23, 2001

E Album is the fifth studio album of Japanese group KinKi Kids. It was released on July 25, 2001. Debuting at the top of the Oricon charts, the album sold 400,480 copies in its first week. The album was certified platinum by the RIAJ for 400,000 copies shipped to stores in Japan.

== Track listing ==
CD
No.	Title	Lyrics	Music	Length
1.	"Lovesick"	Masami Togawa (戸川暢美)	Face 2 Fake
2.	"Boku no Senaka ni wa Hane ga Aru" (ボクの背中には羽根がある, E edit)	Takashi Matsumoto (松本 隆)	Tetsurō Oda (織田哲郎)
3.	"No Control"	Maki Hoemi (牧穂エミ)	Seikō Nagaoka (長岡成貢)
4.	"Hyakunen No Koi" (百年ノ恋, Tsuyoshi Domoto solo)	Tsuyoshi Domoto	Tsuyoshi Domoto
5.	"Father"	Ryūichi Shinozaki (篠崎隆一)	Kaori Kishitani (奥居 香)
6.	"Te Wo Futte Sayonara" (手を振ってさよなら)	Hirō Ooyagi (オオヤギヒロオ)	Ooyagi
7.	"Broken Reizouko" (Broken冷蔵庫)	Masami Tozawa (戸沢暢美)	Ayumi Miyazaki (宮崎 歩)
8.	"Jōnetsu" (情熱 Passion)	Satomi	Boris Durdevic
9.	"Love U4 Good"	Double S	Ryoki Matsumoto (松本良喜)
10.	"So Young Blues" (Koichi Domoto solo)	Mitsuru Matsuoka (松岡 充)	Koichi Domoto
11.	"Honey Rider"	Takeshi Aida (相田 毅)	Hara Kazuhiro (原 一博)
12.	"Gekkō" (月光)	Shinichi Asada (浅田信一)	Takehiko Iida (飯田建彦)
13.	"Jōnetsu" (Acoustic version)	Satomi	Boris Durdevic
