= B Album =

1998 KinKi Kids album

Studio album by KinKi Kids
- Released: August 12, 1998
- Genre: J-pop
- Length: 63:30
- Labels: Johnny's Entertainment; JECN-0004

KinKi Kids chronology
A Album (1997)	B Album (1998)	C Album (1999)

Singles from B album
- 1. "Garasu no Shōnen" Released: July 21, 1997; 2. "Aisareru yori Aishitai" Released: November 12, 1997; 3. "Jet Coaster Romance" Released: April 22, 1998

B Album is the second studio album of the Japanese duo KinKi Kids. It was released on August 12, 1998, and debuted at the top of the Oricon charts, selling 524,540 copies in its first week. The album was certified Million by RIAJ.

== Track listing ==
CD
No.	Title	Lyrics	Music	Length
1.	"Suppin Girl" (スッピンGirl)	Masami Tozawa (戸沢暢美)	Takehiko Iida (飯田建彦)
2.	"Kebyō Wo Tsukaō" (仮病をつかおう)	Tozawa	Masayuki Iwata (岩田雅之)
3.	"Aisareru yori Aishitai" (愛されるより 愛したい)	Hiromi Mori (森浩 美)	Kōji Makaino (馬飼野康二)
4.	"My Wish" (Koichi Domoto solo)	Koichi Domoto	Koichi Domoto
5.	"Ai Nante Kotoba Ja Ienai" (愛なんてコトバじゃ言えない)	Anzuki Mana (真名杏樹)	Iwata
6.	"Zutto Dakishimetai" (ずっと抱きしめたい)	Takeshi Aida (相田 毅), Tsuyoshi Domoto	Ichirō Terada (寺田一郎)
7.	"Innocent Wars" (イノセント・ウォーズ)	Masao Urino (売野雅勇)	Ryuichi Sakamoto (坂本龍一)
8.	"Borderline" (ボーダーライン)	KinKi Kids, Aida	Face 2 Fake
9.	"Message"	Hidemi Yamamoto (山本英美)	Hitoshi Haba (羽場仁志)
10.	"Slowly" (Tsuyoshi Domoto solo)	Tsuyoshi Domoto	Tsuyoshi Domoto
11.	"Kono Mama Te Wo Tsunaide" (このまま手をつないで)	Takashi Matsumoto (松本 隆)	Makaino
12.	"Jet Coaster Romance" (ジェットコースター・ロマンス)	Matsumoto	Tatsuro Yamashita (山下達郎)
13.	"Garasu no Shōnen" (硝子の少年)	Matsumoto	Yamashita

== Charts ==
=== Weekly charts ===
Weekly chart performance for B Album
Chart (1998)	Peak position
Japan (Oricon)	1
