= Hoshi ni Negai o =

Hoshi ni Negai o (Hoshi ni Negai wo) (星に願いを; lit. "Wish Upon a Star") may refer to:

== Films and television ==
- Hoshi ni Negai o, 2005 Japanese television special starring Tsuyoshi Domoto
- Night of the Shooting Star, 2003 Japanese film starring Yuko Takeuchi
- Mega Man: Upon a Star, known in Japan as Rockman: Hoshi ni Negai o (ロックマン 星に願いを), a Japanese anime original video animation

== Music ==
- "Hoshi ni Negai o", 2000 track in the album Sangu Rose by Japanese singer Cocco
- "Hoshi ni Negai o ~When you wish upon Star☆drops~", 2007 single by Japanese singer Miyuki Hashimoto
- "Hoshi ni Negai wo", 1974 single by Agnes Chan
- "Hoshi ni Negai wo", 2009 track in the album What's Flumpool!? by Japanese rock band Flumpool
- "Faraway (Hoshi ni Negai o)" (Faraway 〜星に願いを〜), the thirty-second single by Japanese recording artist Gackt

== See also ==
- When You Wish Upon a Star (disambiguation)
- Wish Upon a Star (disambiguation)
- 星願 (disambiguation)
