= When You Wish Upon a Star (disambiguation) =

"When You Wish Upon a Star" is a song from the 1940 film Pinocchio.

When You Wish Upon a Star may also refer to:

- When You Wish Upon a Star (album), 2016
- Hoshi no Furumachi, a manga whose name translates to "When You Wish Upon a Star"
  - Hoshi no Furumachi (film), a 2011 film adapted from the manga

== See also ==
- "When You Dish Upon a Star", a 1998 episode of The Simpsons
- Hoshi ni Negai o (disambiguation)
- Wish Upon a Star (disambiguation)
- 星願 (disambiguation)
