= D Album =

Studio album by KinKi Kids
- Released: December 13, 2000
- Genre: J-pop
- Length: 60:26
- Labels: Johnny's Entertainment; JECN-0015

KinKi Kids chronology
KinKi Karaoke Single Selection (2000)	D Album (2000)	E Album (2001)

Singles from D album
- 1. "Natsu No Ōsama" Released: June 21, 2000; 2. "Mou Kimi Igai Aisenai" Released: June 21, 2000

D Album is the fourth studio album of the Japanese group KinKi Kids. It was released on December 13, 2000. Debuting at the top of the Oricon charts, the album sold 354,830 copies in its first week.

== Track listing ==
CD
No.	Title	Lyrics	Music	Length
1.	"Burning Love"	Hirō Ooyagi (オオヤギヒロオ)	Hitoshi Munakata	4:32
2.	"Back Fire"	Masami Tozawa (戸沢暢美)	Tomoki Ishizuka	3:42
3.	"Natsu No Ōsama" (夏の王様)	Chinfa Kan (康珍化)	Ichirō Hada (羽田一郎)	4:45
4.	"Misty"	Kohei Dojima	Dojima	4:19
5.	"Angel" (エンジェル)	Shinichi Asada (浅田信一)	Shin Tanimoto (谷本 新)	4:30
6.	"Jūni Gatsu" (十ニ月, Tsuyoshi Domoto solo)	Tsuyoshi Domoto	Tsuyoshi Domoto	5:30
7.	"Nantoka Shimashō" (ナンとかしましょう)	Taku Mitsui (三井 拓)	Face 2 Fake	3:52
8.	"Kotae Wa Kitto Kokoro No Nakani" (こたえはきっと心の中に)	Dojima	Dojima	5:16
9.	"Eien No Hibi..." (永遠の日々…, Koichi Domoto solo)	Koichi Domoto	Koichi Domoto	5:41
10.	"Yokubō No Rain" (欲望のレイン)	Tozawa	Ayumi Miyazaki (宮崎 歩)	4:48
11.	"KinKi Kids Forever"	Jonas Saeed	Jonas Saeed	3:32
12.	"Mō Kimi Igai Aisenai" (もう君以外愛せない)			4:55
13.	"Hey! Wa" (Hey!和)	Masato Nagai (永井真人)	Nagai	4:55
