= H Album: Hand =

Studio album by KinKi Kids
- Released: November 16, 2005
- Genre: J-pop
- Length: 56:09 (Limited edition); 61:17 (Regular edition)
- Labels: Johnny's Entertainment; JECN-0078/79 (CD-DVD Limited edition); JECN-0080 (Regular edition)

KinKi Kids chronology
G Album: 24/7 (2003)	H Album: Hand (2005)	I Album: ID (2006)

Singles from H Album: Hand
- 1. "Anniversary" Released: December 22, 2004; 2. "Velvet no Yami" Released: June 15, 2005

H Album: Hand (stylized as H album -H・A・N・D-) is the eighth studio album of the Japanese duo KinKi Kids. After nearly a year without an album-release, the duo released H Album: Hand on November 16, 2005. It debuted at the top of the Oricon charts, selling 245,681 copies in its first week. The album was certified platinum by the RIAJ for 250,000 copies shipped to stores in Japan.

== Track listing ==
CD
No.	Title	Lyrics	Music	Length
1.	"Arabesque (Senya Ichiya No Yume)" (Arabesque ～千夜一夜の夢～)	Kōji Ide (井手コウジ)	Ide	4:22
2.	"Anniversary"	Satomi	Tetsurō Oda (織田 哲郎)	5:01
3.	"Renrui" (恋涙)	Tsuyoshi Domoto	Koichi Domoto	4:50
4.	"Aozora"	Mitsuyoshi Takasu	Daichi (大智)	4:44
5.	"Kimi Wa Karma" (キミハカルマ)	Takahiro Maeda (前田 たかひろ)	Daichi	4:28
6.	"Love Me More" (Koichi Domoto solo)	Yuuki Shirai (白井 裕紀), Mika Arata (新 美香)	Marcus Dernulf, Marit Woody	4:34
7.	"Breath" (Tsuyoshi Domoto solo)	Kyogo Kawaguchi (河口 恭吾)	Kawaguchi	4:35
8.	"Water Screen: Theme of H"	Tomoji Sogawa (十川 知司)	Sogawa	4:39
9.	"Velvet no Yami" (ビロードの闇)	Satomi	Kenji Hayashida (林田 健司)	5:14
10.	"Diamond Story" (ダイヤモンド・ストーリー)	Sō Matsumoto (松本 素生)	Takashi Iioka (飯岡 隆志)	5:58
11.	"Eki Made Wa Onaji Kaerimichi" (駅までは同じ帰り道)	Kubota	Takehiko Iida (飯田 建彦)	5:00
12.	"Mikan no Love Song" (未完のラブ・ソング)	Gajin	Gajin	4:59
13.	"99% Liberty"	Maeda	Oda	5:21
14.	"In My Heart" (Regular edition only)	Hiro Ooyagi (オオヤギ ヒロオ)	Ooyagi	5:21
