= J Album =

Studio album by KinKi Kids
- Released: December 9, 2009
- Genre: Pop
- Length: 49:24 (Limited edition); 54:30 (Regular edition)
- Labels: Johnny's Entertainment; JECN-212/3 (Limited edition); JECN-214 (Regular edition)

KinKi Kids chronology
Phi (2007)	J Album (2009)	K Album (2011)

Singles from J Album
- 1. "Secret Code" Released: August 27, 2008; 2. "Yakusoku" Released: January 28, 2009; 3. "Swan Song" Released: October 28, 2009

J Album is the eleventh studio album released by Japanese duo KinKi Kids on December 9, 2009. The album was certified gold by the RIAJ for 100,000 copies shipped to stores in Japan.

== Commercial performance ==
J Album debuted at number-one with the sales of around 72,000 copies on the Japanese Oricon daily charts. It maintained its number-one spot with the sales of around 170,000 copies on the Japanese Oricon weekly charts.

== Track listing ==
CD
No.	Title	Lyrics	Music	Length
1.	"Swan Song"	Takashi Matsumoto	Kōhei Segawa (瀬川浩平)	4:24
2.	"Hōseki o Chiribamete"	Yōji Kubota (久保田洋司)	Kenji Hayashida (林田健司)	3:46
3.	"Ashioto"	Yasushi Akimoto (秋元康)	Yamazo	5:06
4.	"Yakusoku"	Asari Shingo (浅利進吾)	Yūsuke Katō (加藤裕介)	4:16
5.	"Tsubasa: Little Wing"	Satomi	Testurō Oda (織田哲郎)	5:11
6.	"Walk On..."	Gajin	Morihiro Suzuki (鈴木盛広)	3:56
7.	"Secret Code"	Satomi	Nittoku Inoue (井上日徳)	4:17
8.	"Yūutsu to Niji"	Murano Chokkyū (村野直球)	Narumi Kazuto (成海カズト)	4:35
9.	"I Will"	ma-saya	Quadraphonic	4:09
10.	"Missing"	Mika Arata (新美香)	Anna Engh/Fredrik "Figge" Bostrom	3:54
11.	"Kaze no Sonnet"	Shin'ichi Asada (浅田信一)	Daichi (大智)	5:03
12.	"Ai ni Tsuite" (Regular edition only)	Kuririn Benimatsu (紅茉來鈴)	Kazuki Ogiwara (萩原和樹)

== Charts ==
=== Weekly charts ===
Chart (2009)	Peak position
Japan Oricon Daily Album Chart	1
Japan Oricon Weekly Album Chart	1
Japan Oricon Yearly Album Chart	49

=== Sales and certifications ===
Country	Provider	Sales	Certification
Japan	RIAJ	170,183	Gold
