= Kohei Dojima =

- Born: 堂島 孝平 (Dōjima Kōhei); February 22, 1976 (age 49); Osaka, Japan
- Citizenship: Japan
- Occupations: Musician; songwriter; record producer
- Years active: 1994–present
- Spouse: Undisclosed (m. 2013)
- Musical career
- Instruments: Vocals; guitar; synthesizer
- Labels: Nippon Columbia; Tokuma Japan Communications; VAP; Imperial Records; Quwabara² Records
- Website: djkh.jp

Kohei Dojima (堂島 孝平, Dōjima Kōhei; born February 22, 1976) is a Japanese singer-songwriter. He made his major debut in 1995 and gained nationwide recognition in 1997 through his work as the theme song performer for the anime series KochiKame: Tokyo Beat Cops. Dojima has received high acclaim for his skills as a songwriter and sound producer, having provided compositions and production work for a wide array of artists, including the KinKi Kids, Fumiya Fujii, Tomohisa Yamashita, Sexy Zone, Puffy, The Collectors, Takashi Fujii, Negicco, and Angerme.

== Biography ==
Born in Osaka and raised in Toride, Ibaraki Prefecture, Dojima developed a passion for music early on, entering the industry at age 17. He debuted as a solo singer-songwriter with his major debut single "Ore wa Doko e Iku" through Nippon Columbia in 1995 at 18, quickly gaining attention for his melodic sensibility. In 1997, his seventh single, "Katsushika Rhapsody", was selected as the theme song for the anime KochiKame: Tokyo Beat Cops Initially hesitant to take the project for fear of being typecast, he accepted after the producers specifically requested his involvement, regarding it as a chance to reach younger audiences. Originally scheduled for a six-month run, the song remained the anime’s opening theme for approximately four years, becoming one of his most recognizable works.

However, his early career faced a significant setback when his agency went bankrupt at age 22. This crisis prompted introspection, leading him to reaffirm his love for music. "I realized I truly loved music when I kept writing songs to lift myself up during that tough time," Dojima later reflected. This pivotal moment solidified his resolve to pursue music independently of external support.

In the summer of 1999, Dojima joined the agency Sony Music Artists (SMA), a move influenced by his connection with Japanese band Smile, led by vocalist Shinichi Asada, and his admiration for former SMA act HicksVille. At SMA, he found mentorship from industry veterans like Tokyo Ska Paradise Orchestra, Yo-King, and Hideyoshi Sakurai of the Magokoro Brothers, who praised his songwriting. Their encouragement was crucial in an era when pop and rock were distinctly separated, giving Dojima confidence to carve his niche. The SMA staff also recognized his potential as a songwriter, noting that even if his singing career faltered, his compositional talent would sustain him—a foresight that shaped his versatile career.

Dojima's songwriting career took off with his contribution to KinKi Kids' 2000 album D album, providing the track "Misty," which both Koichi and Tsuyoshi Domoto hailed as impactful. This marked the beginning of a prolific partnership, with Dojima contributing over 30 songs to the group, including the 2002 chart-topping single "Kanashimi Blue." His work extended to regular appearances on the music variety show Domoto Brothers and, from 2016, serving as a co-producer, earning him the moniker "the third KinKi Kid." Dojima notes that writing for others, particularly KinKi Kids, helped him understand his own musical identity, with their performances enhancing the emotional depth of his compositions. He views songwriting and performing as "two wheels" driving his career, each informing and enriching the other. Over the years, he has written or produced music for a diverse group of performers including Fumiya Fujii, Otoha, Hiromi Ōta, Mayumi Iizuka, The Collectors, Idoling!!!, Maaya Sakamoto, the theater troupe Caramel Box, and others. He has also worked as a producer for artists such as Yoeko Kurahashi and bands including Kuroneko Chelsea, Oreskaband, and U&DESIGN. In addition to anime themes, Dojima composed the theme for Fuji TV’s variety program Hey! Spring of Trivia.

Alongside his solo career, Dojima has performed with and led a variety of ensembles. His live projects have ranged from intimate solo performances such as Ore Hitori Live and Solo Style, to large-scale shows with groups like Kohei Dojima x Go-Go King Recorders (DDKH×GGKR), Kohei Dojima x Hi-Tension Please!, Kohei Dojima x The Vivappers, Yo-King x Kohei Dojima (King & Prince), and the 15-member unit Kohei Dojima Gakudan. He has also collaborated with many senior artists he admires, including Motoharu Sano, Makoto Sugi, Ginji Ito, Chu Kosaka, Shigeru Suzuki, Taeko Ōnuki, Morio Agata, and EPO. In 2011, he began a new four-member band lineup (Band Style) with Shigeru Komatsu (drums), Tatsuya Kashima (bass), and Kensuke Okuda (guitar). That same year he formed the duo Small Boys with Gotoh Nishidera, releasing the album ABCDEFGHIJKLMNOPQRSTUVWXYZ.

In 2012, Dojima launched the A.C.E. project (acronym for A Crazy Ensemble), where he worked again with Komatsu, Kashima, and Okuda. Dojima characterized the A.C.E. approach as a “new phase” in his career, focusing on minimal instrumentation, leaner arrangements, and a stronger emphasis on the singer-songwriter’s presence.
