= A Album =

1997 KinKi Kids album

Studio album by KinKi Kids
- Released: July 21, 1997
- Genre: J-pop
- Length: 42:38
- Label: Johnny's Entertainment; JECN-0003

KinKi Kids chronology
A Album (1997)	B Album (1998)

A Album is the debut album of the Japanese group KinKi Kids. It was released on July 21, 1997, on the same day as their debut single "Garasu no Shōnen". The album debuted at the top of the Oricon charts, selling 315,330 copies in its first week. It was certified Million by RIAJ and is currently the duo's second best-selling album.

== Track listing ==
CD
No.	Title	Lyrics	Music	Length
1.	"Rocks"	Takeshi Aida (相田 毅)	Shin Tanimoto (谷本 新)	4:33
2.	"Kiss Kara Hajimaru Mystery" (Kissからはじまるミステリー)	Takashi Matsumoto (松本 隆)	Tatsuro Yamashita (山下達郎)	5:07
3.	"Tell Me"	Aida	Hitoshi Haba (羽場仁志)	4:19
4.	"Boku wa Omou" (僕は思う, Koichi Domoto solo)	Aida	Tanimoto	4:04
5.	"Setsunai Koi Ni Kizuite" (せつない恋に気づいて)	Mizue & Hide	Ichirō Terada (寺田一郎)	4:27
6.	"Distance"	Hidemi Yamamoto (山本英美)	Mark Davis	3:28
7.	"Hitori Janai" (ひとりじゃない, Tsuyoshi Domoto solo)	Mark Davis	Hiromi Mori (森浩 美)	3:52
8.	"Ano Ko Wa So Fine" (あの娘はSo Fine)	Aida	Tanimoto	5:11
9.	"Friends"	Mori	Haba	5:01
10.	"Tayori ni Shitemasse" (たよりにしてまっせ)	Minawo Yoshida (吉田みなを), Ryoichi Hattori (村雨まさを)	Hattori	2:41

== Charts ==
=== Weekly charts ===
Weekly chart performance for A Album
Chart (1997)	Peak position
Japan (Oricon)	1
