= Domoto (band) =

Japanese idol duo

- Also known as: KinKi Kids (1993–2025)
- Origin: Japan
- Genre: J-pop
- Years active: 1993–present
- Label: Elov Label
- Formerly of: J-Friends
- Members: Koichi Domoto; Tsuyoshi Domoto
- Website: Domoto's official site

Domoto (stylized in all caps) is a Japanese duo consisting of Koichi Domoto and Tsuyoshi Domoto under the talent agency Starto Entertainment (formerly of Johnny & Associates). Domoto was formed in 1993 as KinKi Kids and officially debuted on July 21, 1997. With more than 30 million physical copies sold, they are one of the best selling boy groups in Asian history and top 20 best-selling artists of all time in Japan. Although the members share the same surname, the only relation they have to each other is that they both hail from the Kinki region, hence the duo's name.

Domoto holds the Guinness World Records for having the most consecutive No.1 singles since debut (47 works) and the most consecutive years with a Japanese No.1 single (28 years, 1997–2024). They have 20 No.1 albums of which 14 are consecutive, making them the artist who has the third most No.1 albums in Japan. Since 1998, the duo has held 60 concerts at Tokyo Dome, making them the artist to hold the most concerts at the Dome.

In 2025, KinKi Kids announced their name change to Domoto, which occurred on July 21 of that year.

After 35 years affiliated to either Johnny & Associates or Starto Entertainment, Domoto's contract ends in 2026. Tsuyoshi Domoto left the agency in 2024, Koichi Domoto is to continue under an agent contract.

== History ==
=== 1991–1993: Formation ===
The duo first met each other during a Hikaru Genji concert at Yokohama Arena on May 5, 1991. From then on, the two began to appear together in magazine photoshoots together though they did not have a formal name, going through several temporary names such as Johnny's Kansai Group, Domoto Brothers and W Domoto, before being introduced as Kanzai Boya by the end of 1992 when they were backup dancers for SMAP. On the first episode of SMAP's variety show Kiss Shita? SMAP, which began on April 4, 1993, SMAP leader Masahiro Nakai announced that their name was to be "KinKi Kids" when the two joined the show as regulars.

=== 1994–1996: Breakthrough, variety shows and dramas ===
From July 1994 to September 1994, Koichi and Tsuyoshi both appeared in their first drama together called Ningen Shikkaku, which had a peak rating of 28.9% on its final episode. The duo gained popularity in a short time and held their first concert at the Budokan on December 31, 1994. In 1995 and 1996, Tsuyoshi played Kindaichi in dramas Kindaichi Shōnen no Jikenbo 1 and 2, while Koichi also starred as main roles in dramas Ie Naki Ko 2 and Ginrō Kaiki File, which all achieved average rating of more than 20%.

From April 1996 to June 1996, the duo once again starred together in the drama Wakaba no Koro, playing friends with very different backgrounds. Tsuyoshi played a boy with an alcoholic father who works to take care for his younger siblings while Koichi played a boy who comes from a wealthy yet unloving family. One of the most watched music varieties in Japan LOVE LOVE Aishiteru hosted by KinKi Kids and Takuro Yoshida started to air since 1996, creating a boom of studying guitar among the Japanese younger generation. The duo also had their name-entitled variety shows such as Sore Ike KinKi Daiboken and Sore Ike KinKi Daihoso in 1996. On December 31, 1996, they performed as supporting guest for Masahiko Kondō in Kohaku Uta Gassen, singing part of "Midnight Shuffle", which was the theme song of Koichi's drama Ginrō Kaiki File.

=== 1997–1999: Debut and Million-selling hits ===
Despite holding concerts and having several high-rating varieties and dramas, the duo did not make their CD debut until July 21, 1997. They debuted with a double release of a single "Garasu no Shōnen" and an album A Album. According to Oricon, both went on to sell over one million copies, making the duo the second artist whose first single and first album both sold over one million copies. From August 23 to August 24, they were appointed the main personality hosts for NTV's annual telethon 24-Hour Television. From October 18 to December 20, KinKi Kids starred in their third drama together called Bokura no Yūki Miman City, and the theme song "Aisareru Yori Aishitai", which was also their second single, was released on November 12. This single ranked No.1 for 4 weeks in Oricon in total and sold over a million copies by the end of its chart run. By the end of the year, Garasu no Shōnen ranked 2nd on the annual Oricon charts, behind Namie Amuro's "Can You Celebrate?".

In 1998, KinKi Kids, along with fellow Johnny's groups V6 and TOKIO, came together to form a special charity-oriented group called J-FRIENDS, in which they collaborated with famous musicians such as Maurice White, Diane Warren, Elton John, Jon Bon Jovi and Michael Jackson. J-FRIENDS's single "Ashita ga Kikoeru/Children's Holiday", released on January 21, 1998, went on to sell over a million copies and ranked 12th on the annual Oricon charts by the end of the year.

The duo's singles "Zenbu Dakishimete/Ao no Jida" released on July 29, 1998, peaked in No.1 for 4 consecutive weeks and ranked 10th on the annual charts with more than a million sales. Furthermore, their 1997 single "Aisareru yori Aishitai" managed to rank 8th on the annual chart. On December 31, 1998, KinKi Kids held concerts in Tokyo Dome and started to hold Tokyo Dome concerts during New Year every since until 2016. In 1999, the duo's 7th single Flower ranked 10th on the annual Oricon charts for selling over a million copies, making it the duo's fourth million-selling single. The duo was invited to perform as a special guest on Kohaku Uta Gassen on December 31, 1999.

=== 2000–2003: Asian tours and Guinness World Record ===
The year 2000 saw the duo's first Asian tour in Taiwan and Hong Kong, which was held at Taipei 101 and the Hong Kong Convention and Exhibition Centre respectively and ran from February 22 to February 27, and their second million-selling album KinKi Single Selection. The duo released their 9th single "Sukininatteku Aishitteku" on March 8, 2000, with the lyrics written by Tsuyoshi and the music composed by Koichi, reaching No.1 in Oricon, making them the first Japanese idol artist to have a No.1 single composed by oneself.

After all 13 of KinKi Kids' singles since their debut ranked the first in Oricon, they were listed in the 2002 edition of the reference book Guinness World Records for having the record of the most consecutive number-one singles since their debut single. It was the first case for a musical artist in Japan to be recognized by the Guinness World Records. Irish group Westlife was listed as this record holder by the Guinness World Records before the duo's accreditation because of making seven consecutive UK number-one singles since their debut as a group.

From December 26, 2002, to July 28, 2003, KinKi Kids held their first five dome tour "KinKi Kids Dome F Concert 〜Fun Fan Forever" in Tokyo Dome, Osaka Dome, Nagoya Dome, Fukuoka Dome and Sapporo Dome.

=== 2004–2006: "Anniversary" and KinKi Single Selection II ===
On December 24, 2004, KinKi Kids released their 20th single "Anniversary" and second compilation album KinKi Single Selection II, both ranked the first in Oricon's single and album chart. This was the seventh time a single and an album of one artist ranked the first in Oricon at the same time, and was the duo's second such achievement after their debut single and album. Moreover, "Anniversary" managed to rank the 6th on the 2005 annual chart. The duo held concerts "KinKi Kids H TOUR -Have A Nice Day-" at Osaka Dome and Tokyo Dome from December 24, 2005, to January 1, 2006. With 24 concerts held at Tokyo Dome, they overtook The Rolling Stones to become the artist to hold the most concerts at the Dome.

=== 2007–2008: 10th anniversary ===
To commemorate their 10th anniversary on July 21, 2007, KinKi Kids released a best-hits album entitled 39 on July 18, 2007. The numbers three and nine are pronounced as "San Kyū" (三九) in Japanese and sound similar to "Thank You" in English, signifying KinKi Kids' gratitude to their fans for their support for the past 10 years. The album features the top 11 song favorites, as voted by fans as well as two individual 14-song favorites lists from Koichi and Tsuyoshi, coming to a total of 39 songs, hence the title. 39 went on to sell about 301,000 copies in its first week. In the same month, the duo was once again recognized by the Guinness World Records for their feat of achieving the most consecutive number-one singles by extending their own record to twenty-five number one singles since debut.On July 22, 2007, the duo held their 10th anniversary concert at Tokyo Dome, which drew a crowd of about 67,000 fans, making it the biggest concert ever held at the Dome. The record was previously held by Tsuyoshi Nagabuchi in 1992 when his concert drew an audience of 65,000.

On May 31, 2008, the duo announced their first summer tour in eight years. The tour started at Tokyo Dome on July 21, 2008—coinciding with their 11th anniversary—and extended the duo's record for holding the most Tokyo Dome concerts.

=== 2009–2015: J Album, K Album, L Album and M Album ===
They released their 28th single "Yakusoku" (約束; "Promise") on January 28, 2009, which debuted at the top of the Oricon charts, not only extending their Guinness record but also improving their own Oricon record for the most consecutive years with a number-one single. The duo's 29th single "Swan Song" (スワンソング, Suwan Songu), released on October 28, 2009, debuted at the top of the Oricon charts, extending their record. Their 14th album J Album was released on December 9, 2009, ranked the first in Oricon. At the end of 2010, the duo released their 30th single "Family: Hitotsu ni Naru Koto" (Family ～ひとつになること; "Family: To Become One"), with the lyrics written by Tsuyoshi and the music composed by Koichi. Their 31st single "Time," also used as the theme song for Dynasty Warriors 7, has extended their Guinness World Record again. The duo released K album on November 9, 2011, which debuted at the top of Oricon charts. KinKi Kids started year 2012 with a new single "Kawatta Katachi no Ishi" (変わったかたちの石; "Odd-shaped stone"). The duo released their 16th and 17th album L Album and M Album on December 4, 2013, and December 10, 2014, both ranked the first in Oricon.

=== 2016–2017: 20th anniversary ===
The duo started their 20th anniversary by the release of single "Bara to Taiyou" on July 20, 2016, followed by the release of album N Album on September 21, 2016, and single "Michi wa Tezukara Yume no Hana" on November 2, 2016, all ranked the first in Oricon. From September 29 to November 12, 2016, KinKi Kids held their first Arena tour in 16 years, returning to the Budokan where they had first concert in 1994. On December 31, 2016, the duo made their first appearance on Kohaku Uta Gassen as formal participant (although they have performed there in 1996 and 1999 as guest), performing their debut single "Garasu no Shonen". On July 12, 2017, the duo released their 38th single "The Red Light", which reached No.1 on the Oricon charts. With No.1 winning singles every year since 1997, KinKi Kids overtook B'z to become the artist to have the most consecutive years with a Japanese No.1 single. The duo held their 20th anniversary events on July 15 and 16 at Yokohama Stadium. On 21 July 2017, the day commemorate the 20th anniversary of debut, the sequel of 1997 drama Bokura no Yūki Miman City starred Koichi and Tsuyoshi was aired as a special drama Bokura no Yūki Miman City: 2017 on NTV, and the music show LOVE LOVE Aishiteru, hosted by KinKi Kids and ended in 2001, revived for one night only in Fuji Television.

=== 2018–2021: "Topaz Love" and O Album ===
KinKi Kids released their 39th single "Topaz Love/Destiny" on January 24, 2018, which is their third self-composed single (lyrics by Tsuyoshi and music by Koichi). It reached No.1 again and is the best-selling single for the duo since 2009. The five succeeding singles released between 2018 and 2022 all reached No.1, extending their record of the most consecutive No.1 singles since debut and the most consecutive years with a Japanese No.1 single to 44 works and 26 years respectively. The duo released their first studio album in four years on December 23, 2020, ranked No.1 in Oricon, which is their 20th No.1 albums. Releasing 21 albums of which 20 reached No.1, they tie up with Ayumi Hamazaki to become the artist who has the third most No.1 albums in Japan.

=== 2022: 25th anniversary ===
On March 16, 2022, KinKi Kids released their first single for their 25th anniversary celebration: "Kōjundo Romance", with lyrics written by Takashi Matsumoto. The single became the 44th No.1 winning single for the duo. In commemoration of their 25th anniversary, an official YouTube channel for KinKi Kids was created, making the duo's music videos available on the streaming platform. On July 21, the music show LOVE LOVE Aishiteru hosted by KinKi Kids revived again, which also marked the last television appearance for the co-host Takuro Yoshida. The duo celebrated by performing their debut single "Garasu no Shōnen", featuring the special unit "Johnny's Seniors", consisting of SMAP's Takuya Kimura, 4TOPS' Shunsuke Kazama, and Toma Ikuta back dancing for KinKi Kids. With the release of the No.1 winning single "Amazing Love" on July 21, 2022, the total sales of KinKi Kids' single exceeds 20 million.

=== 2024: Tsuyoshi's departure from Starto and name change ===
On February 22, 2024, Tsuyoshi Domoto announced via the fan club site that he would be leaving the agency on March 31, mentioning it later on his radio program "Domoto Tsuyoshi to Fashion and Music Book", One of the reasons for seeking his independence was his health, especially his hearing. He also announced it in his Instagram, after deleting all his previous posts. "Regarding my personal activities, I have decided to terminate my contract with my agency on March 31, 2024 at the time of renewal and move on to a new field of life. I felt that I needed to make a big change in my environment in order to continue my life as an artist", is part of the message he shared. Regarding the activities of Kinki Kids and his relationship with Koichi, he said on the program "Kinki Kids donnamonya" that they had been talking about the ways to continue working together, so disbanding was not an option. About the fans, Tsuyoshi stated: "There will be new forms between us and our fans. I don't think it's a problem if something changes. I think there's a future that we can walk towards because we're all part of it". Koichi Domoto had also shared his feelings about his partner's decision, saying that KinKi Kids would continue activities while taking Tsuyoshi's solo activities decision and health into consideration.

On November 11, 2024, a new concert tour was announced. With only four performances, "KinKi Kids Concert 2024-2025 DOMOTO" welcomes the new year in Kyocera Dome (Osaka) (December 31, January 1, 2025) and Tokyo Dome (January 12 and 13, 2025), in their first group concerts after Tsuyoshi's departure from the agency. In the venue, during a live stream, the group announced its official name change to "Domoto", which will take effect during the summer of 2025 with their fourth compilation album planned to be released around the same time which would mark their last release as KinKi Kids.

=== 2026: Domoto's Starto contract ends, and new start ===
After 35 years of affiliation with either Johnny & Associates or Starto Entertainment, with whom they were under an agent contract since 2024, Domoto's contract ends on July 21, 2026. Tsuyoshi Domoto left in 2024 for individual activities, remaining as part of Domoto. Koichi Domoto is to continue under an individual contract after the group's contract expires. About future activities, the pair has not revealed any yet, but, in a post on the official site, they have expressed their gratitude to the fans and people that have supported them until now, and ask for their continued support in their future form, as they plan to continue together but under self management.

== Members ==
- Koichi Domoto (堂本光一): born January 1, 1979, in Hyogo, Japan
- Tsuyoshi Domoto (堂本剛): born April 10, 1979, in Nara, Japan

== Discography ==
=== Studio albums ===
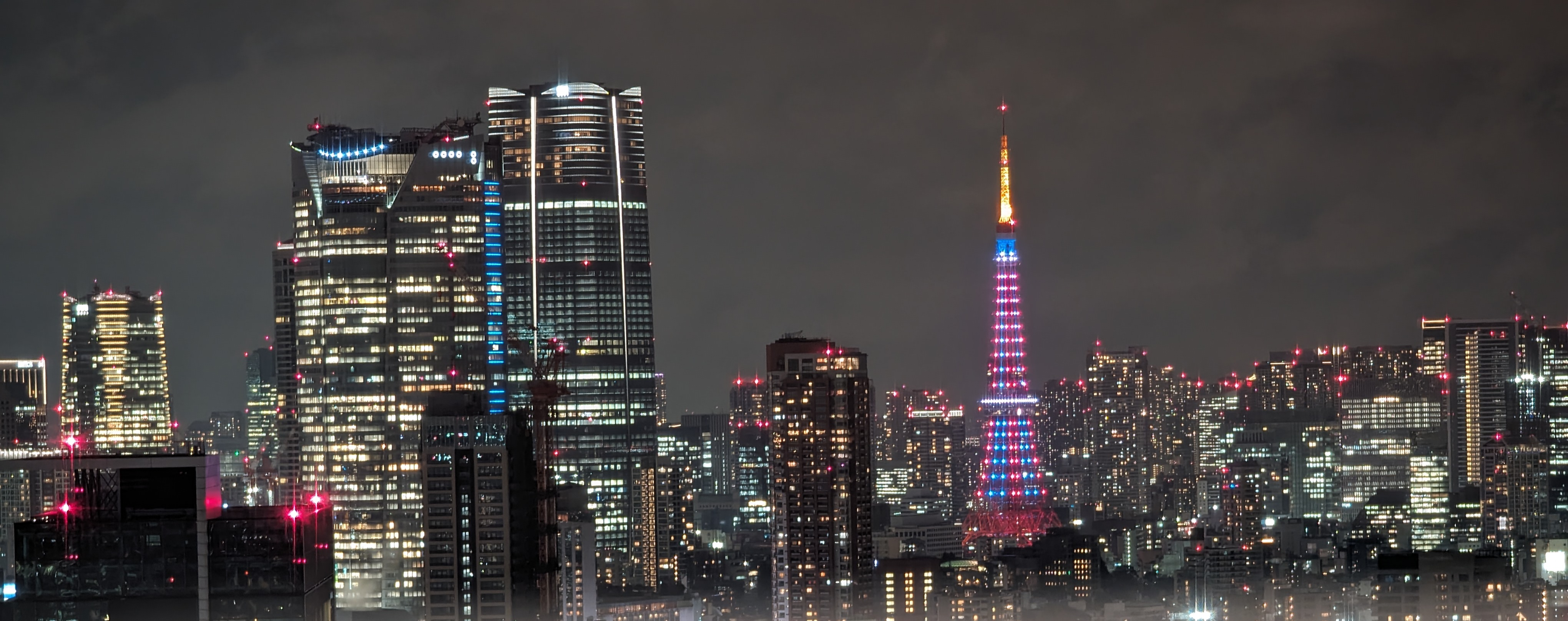
Tokyo Tower lightup celebrating Kinki Kids new album "P album" with their colors, red and blue

- A Album (1997)
- B Album (1998)
- C Album (1999)
- D Album (2000)
- E Album (2001)
- F Album (2002)
- G Album: 24/7 (2003)
- H Album: Hand (2005)
- I Album: ID (2006)
- Phi (2007)
- J Album (2009)
- K Album (2011)
- L Album (2013)
- M Album (2014)
- N Album (2016)
- O Album (2020)
- P Album (2023)

== Filmography ==
For solo activities, please refer to Koichi Domoto or Tsuyoshi Domoto respectively.

=== Television (as host or regular) ===
Year	Title	Role	Note
1993-1994	Kayō Binbin House	Assistant	
1993-1996	Kiss Shita? SMAP	Regular	
1993-1997	Idol on Stage	Performer	
1994	Chōjin Dojji Ball Densetsu	Performer	TV special
1994	Itsumo Kagayaku Idols	Performer	TV special
1995-2022	Music Station	Performer	119 episodes
1996	Sore Iki KinKi Daibōken	Host	
1996-1997	Toki-kin	Regular	
1996-1998	Sore Iki KinKi Daihōsō	Host	
1996-1997	Maketara Akan!	Host	
1996-1997	Barikin 7 Kenjya no Senryaku	Host	
1996-2001	LOVE LOVE Aishiteru	Host	
1996-2016	Kohaku Uta Gassen	Performer	3 episodes (special guest: 1996,1999; formal guest: 2016)
1997	24 Hour Television	Host	Telethon
1997	Star Dokkiri Daisakusen	Host	
1998	Gyu! To Dakishimetai	Host	
1998-1999	KinKi Kids no Gyu!	Host	
2001-2014	Domoto Brothers	Host	Succeeding of LOVE LOVE Aishiteru
2006	LOVE LOVE Domoto Brothers 10 Shunen Special	Host	TV special
2013-2017	SONGS	Themselves	4 episodes (documentary)
2014–2024	KinKi Kids no Bun Bun Bun	Host	
2015	Domoto Brothers 2015	Host	TV special
2015	Inochi no Uta	Host	TV special
2016	Domoto Brothers 2016	Host	TV special
2016	Domoto Brothers Mōsugu Christmas Special	Host	TV special
2017	LOVE LOVE Aishiteru Returns Back in 16 Years Revival Special	Host	TV special
2017	Domoto Brothers 2017	Host	TV special
2018	Domoto Brothers 2018	Host	TV special
2019	Domoto Brothers 2019	Host	TV special
2020	Domoto Brothers 2020	Host	TV special
2021	Domoto Brothers 2021	Host	TV special
2022	LOVE LOVE Aishiteru Finale: Graduation of Yoshida Takuro	Host	TV special

=== Television (as actors) ===
Year	Title	Role	Note
1994	Ningen Shikkaku	Koichi - Ruka Kageyama Tsuyoshi - Makoto Ōba	Main roles
1996	Wakaba no Koro	Tsuyoshi - Takeshi Aizawa Koichi - Kai Fujiki	Lead roles
1997	Bokura no Yūki Miman City	Koichi - Yamato Tsuyoshi - Takeru	Lead roles
2000	Mahhabuiroku Big Daisakusen	Themselves	TV special; Guest
2003	Mukodono	Themselves	Episode 6; Guest
2017	Bokura no Yūki Miman City: 2017	Koichi - Yamato Shindō Tsuyoshi - Takeru Takikawa	TV special; Lead roles; Sequel of the 1997 drama

=== Movies ===
- 1992: 200X Nen Sho
- 1994: Shoot!

=== Stage ===
- 1993: Another

=== Dubbing roles ===
- 2013: Rush, as James Hunt (Koichi) and Niki Lauda (Tsuyoshi) (Japanese dub #1)

== Concerts ==
- KinKi Kids Kick off 95 (December 1994 - January 1995)
- KinKi Kids Kick off 95 SECOND CONCERT (March - May 1995)
- Kick off '95 SUMMER (July 1995)
- Kinkiraki ni KinKi Kids '96 (December 1995 - January 1996)
- LAWSON PRESENTS KinKi Kids '96 (January - February 1996)
- KinKi Nagoya Tokyo 3 kka SHOW (April - May 1996)
- KinKi Kids 96 Natsu da! Zenin Shugō! (July - August 1996)
- SHOW Gattsu SHOW (December 1996 - January 1997)
- LAWSON PRESENTS KinKi Kids '97 (February 1997)
- KinKi Kiss In Dream Spring SHOW (March - May 1997)
- A So Bo Concert (July - August 1997)
- HAPPY HAPPY DATE (December 1997 - January 1998)
- LAWSON PRESENTS KinKi Kids '98 (January - February 1998)
- KinKi Kids 98 SPRING CONCERT HAPPY HAPPY DATE (May 1998)
- Summer Concert '98 (July - August 1998)
- Winter Concert '98〜'99 (December 1998 - January 1999)
- Summer Concert '99 (July - August 1999)
- Winter Concert (December 1999)
- KinKi Kids DOME CONCERT 「LOVELOVE2000 in TOKYODOME」(January 2000)
- 1st ASIAN TOUR KinKi Kids MILLENNIUM CONCERT In Taiwan HONGKONG (February 2000)
- KinKi Kids Selection Stadium Tour King Of SUMMER 2000 (July - September 2000)
- Domoto Dome de Daininki KinKi Kids concert 2000〜2001 (December 2000 - January 2001)
- KinKi Kids Returns! 2001 Concert Tour in Hong Kong Taipei (May 2001)
- KinKi Kids FILM CONCERT 2001 SUMMER (August 2001)
- KinKi Kids DOME CONCERT 'Minna Genki Kai?' (December 2001 - January 2002)
- KinKi Kids Dome F Concert 〜Fun Fan Forever〜 (December 2002 - January 2003)
- KinKi Kids Dome F Concert 〜Fun Fan Forever・Eien no BLOODS〜 (May - June 2003)
- KinKi Kids 24/7 G TOUR (December 2003 - January 2004)
- KinKi Kids DOME TOUR 2004–2005 〜font de Anniversary.〜 (December 2004 - January 2005)
- KinKi Kids H TOUR -Have A Nice Day- (December 2005 - January 2006)
- KinKi Kids Concert Tour 2006-2007「Harmony of Winter -iD-」 (December 2006 - January 2007)
- KinKi Kids 10th Anniversary in TOKYO DOME (July 2007)
- We are Øn' 39!! and U? KinKi Kids Live in DOME 07-08 (December 2007 - January 2009)
- KinKi Kids Kinkyū Tour KinKi you Concert。(July - November 2008)
- KinKi Kids Kinkyū Tour KinKi you Concert。Dainidan (November 2008 - January 2009)
- KinKi Kids concert tour J (December 2009 - January 2010)
- KinKi Kids 2010–2011 〜Kimi mo Domoto Family〜 (December 2010 - January 2011)
- King・KinKi Kids 2011–2012 (December 2011 - January 2012)
- KinKi Kids Concert Thank you for 15 years 2012–2013 (December 2012 - January 2013)
- L album special live (December 2013)
- KinKi Kids Concert 2013–2014 「L」 (December 2013 - January 2014)
- KinKi Kids Concert ｢Memories & Moments｣ (December 2014 - January 2015)
- 2015-2016 Concert KinKi Kids (December 2015 - January 2016)
- We are KinKi Kids Live Tour 2016 〜TSUYOSHI & KOICHI〜 (September - November 2016)
- We are KinKi Kids DOME CONCERT 2016–2017 〜TSUYOSHI&YOU&KOICHI〜 (December 2016 - January 2017)
- MTV Unplugged：KinKi Kids (May 2017)
- KinKi Kids Party!〜Thank you for 20 years〜 (July 2017)
- KinKi Kids Concert 20.2.21〜Everything happens for a reason〜 (December 2017 - January 2018)
- KinKi Kids Concert Tour 2019-2020 ThanKs 2 YOU (December 2019 - January 2020)
- X'mas with KinKi Kids gift selection 2020 (December 2020, Online)
- KinKi Kids O Shōgatsu Concert 2021 (January 2021, Online)
- KinKi Kids Concert 2022 (January 2022)
- 24451〜Kimi to Boku no Koe〜 (July - August 2022)
- KinKi Kids Concert 2024-2025 DOMOTO (December 2024 - January 2025)

== Reception ==
In a 2006 survey of people between 10 and 49 years of age in Japan, Oricon Style found the number one selling song "Happy Happy Greeting" (608,790 copies) to be the fourth most popular Valentine's Day song in Japan. The most popular song was Sayuri Kokushō's 1986 debut single "Valentine Kiss", which sold only 317,000 copies. The other songs in the top five were (in order) "Love Love Love" from Dreams Come True (2,488,630 copies), "Valentine's Radio" from Yumi Matsutoya (1,606,780 copies), and "My Funny Valentine" by Miles Davis.

== Awards ==
Year	Ceremony	Award	Nominee/Work	Result
2000	26th Television Drama Academy Awards	Best Theme Song	"Natsu no Ōsama" (Summer Snow)	Won
2003	35th Television Drama Academy Awards	Best Theme Song	"Solitude: Shinjitsu no Sayonara" (Remote)	Won

== See also ==
- List of best-selling music artists in Japan
