= Koichi Domoto =

Japanese idol, singer, actor and composer

- 堂本 光一
- Born: January 1, 1979 (age 47); Ashiya, Hyōgo, Japan
- Occupations: Singer-songwriter; actor; television personality; voice actor
- Years active: 1992–present
- Musical career
- Genre: J-pop
- Instruments: Vocals; guitar
- Years active: 1992–present
- Label: ELOV-Labels
- Member of: Domoto
- Formerly of: J-Friends

Koichi Domoto (堂本 光一, Dōmoto Kōichi; born January 1, 1979) is a Japanese idol, singer, actor, singer-songwriter, composer, lyricist, television personality, voice actor. Along with Tsuyoshi Domoto (with whom he has no blood-relation), he is a member of the duo Domoto, who holds the Guinness World Records for having the most consecutive No.1 singles since debut and the most consecutive years with a Japanese No.1 single, and with whom is one of the top 25 best-selling artists of all time in Japan.

Although Domoto also actively works as a television actor and host, he is most famous for his musical SHOCK series, which he participates as the lead actor and director at the same time. SHOCK series started at the Tokyo Imperial Theatre in 2000, making him the youngest Zachō (chairman and lead role) and the first idol to perform at Imperial Theatre. With over 2000 performances, SHOCK series is now the most-performed musical and the second most-performed theatre with a single-lead in Japan. In 2018, he starred in the musical Knights' Tale directed by John Caird as well.

Domoto will be under agent contract in Starto starting in July 2026.

== Career ==
Born in Ashiya, Hyōgo, Japan, Domoto joined the Japanese talent agency Johnny & Associates at the age of 12 after his sister sent in his application without his knowledge. Domoto and his bandmate Tsuyoshi Domoto first worked together as back-dancers for Hikaru Genji, who were holding a concert at Yokohama Arena, and has since then been partnered up for magazine photoshoots, music acts and drama projects. The duo eventually made their debut in 1997 with a double release of a single Garasu no Shōnen and an album A Album, both of which went on to sell over a million copies.

After Domoto, the group, leaves Starto on July 21, 2026, when their agent contract ends, to pursue a career as a self managed group, Koichi is to remain under an individual agent contract in Starto for individual activities.

=== Theatre ===
In 1993, Domoto played in his first stage in SMAP's ANOTHER. As early as in 1994, he expressed his enthusiasm of musical, saying that his dream was to "play in musicals that have singing, dancing and acting" in an interview. In 1997, he played in the stage kyotokyo with many others from Johnny & Associates. He managed to star as the lead (or Zachō in Japanese) in musical MASK'99 in Nissay Theatre in 1999.

In November 2000, Domoto played the lead role in musical MILLENNIUM SHOCK, becoming the youngest Zachō and also the first idol to play the lead at Tokyo Imperial Theatre. Since then, SHOCK series has continued to perform every year. The title was changed to Shōgeki・SHOCK, SHOCK is Real SHOCK and Shocking SHOCK in the following years but had the similar story. In 2005, it was revised to Endless SHOCK and the story was changed completely. Domoto started to participate as the director and composed several songs since this year. In April 2008, the long-running musical Endless SHOCK was awarded the Grand Prize of the 33rd Kazuo Kikuta Drama Awards for theatre. In January 2012, Endless SHOCK was performed at Hakata-za in Fukuoka, which was the first time for the musical to be performed in places other than Tokyo. On March 21, 2013, Endless SHOCK welcomed its 1000th performance, making it the forth theatre to reach 1000 performances in Japan. It was also brought to Umeda Arts Theatre in Osaka in September 2013. After its 1408th performance on October 26, 2014, Endless SHOCK overtook Matsumoto Hakuō II's Japanese version of Man of La Mancha to become the most-performed musical and the second most-performed theatre with single lead-starring in Japan. In April 2020, Domoto alone was awarded the Grand Prize of the 45th Kazuo Kikuta Drama Awards for his achievement for leading SHOCK series for twenty years, becoming the youngest single winner of this award. The premiere of MILLENNIUM SHOCK in 2000 at Imperial Theatre was controversial since it was also the first time a theatre from Johnny & Associates was performed there. It was believed that idols were unqualified to stand at the most famous and important theatre in Japan, let alone playing the lead at the age of 21. However, SHOCK gradually becomes one of the most important musicals at Imperial Theatre and one of the representing Japanese original musicals. SHOCK series reached its 1800th performance on February 12, 2021, reaching the 2000th in 2024.

After the success of SHOCK, Domoto took over the position of director of another musical in 2019. DREAM BOYS, produced by Johnny & Associates and starring Domoto's junior colleagues, has been on stage for more than 20 years.

In November 2010, he appeared in stage production of Shichinin no Samurai, an adaptation of Seven Samurai, produced by Kansai Yamamoto.

In 2018, Domoto became the fourth person in 26 years to play a lead for four months in a year at Imperial Theatre, by starring in Endless SHOCK from February to March, and playing Arcite in John Caird's musical Knights' Tale, an adaptation of William Shakespeare's The Two Noble Kinsmen, from July to August.

=== Acting ===
After joining Johnny & Associates, Domoto played his first role in movie 200X Nen Shō in 1992 and first role in drama Aiyo Nemuranaide in 1993. From July 1994 to September 1994, Domoto and his bandmate Tsuyoshi appeared in drama Ningen Shikkaku, which had a peak rating of 28.9% on its final episode. In 1994 and 1995, he starred as the main male role in move Ie Naki Ko and the drama Ie Naki Ko 2, which had a rating of 31.9% on its final episode. He gained unprecedented popularity through these works even though he had not formally debuted as KinKi Kids. From January to March 1996, he played two roles, Ginrō Fuwa and Kōsuke Fuwa, in drama Ginrō Kaiki File: Futatsu No Zunō Wo Motsu Shōnen, which had an average rating of more than 20%. He also starred together with his bandmate Tsuyoshi for their second drama together in Wakaba No Koro in 1996.

On August 23, 1997, Domoto starred in his first drama after debut in Yūki To Iu Koto, as a special drama corner of NTV's annual telethon 24-Hour Television, in which KinKi Kids were also appointed as the main host. The drama had a rating of 26.3%, becoming the highest rated 24-Hour Television special drama at the time, and it is still the second highest one until now. From October to December 1997, Domoto and his bandmate Tsuyoshi Domoto was both starred in their third drama, called Bokura no Yūki Miman City. Since then, Domoto stars one drama every year, which all received relatively high ratings. He shifted his focus to musicals after starring in Remote from October to December 2002, where he won the 'best supporting actor' in the 35th Drama Academy Award.

In 2006, Domoto starred in his first drama in four years as the lead in Kinō Kōen, which was part of TV special Tales of The Unusual 2006 Autumn Special Drama. In July 2007, Domoto starred as the lead in a drama entitled Sushi Ōji!, where he played the role of a martial artist training in the art of sushi. In addition, the sequel movie Ginmaku Ban Sushi Ōji!: New York e Iku was released on April 19, 2008. It was his first movie appearance since the 1994 movie Ienaki Ko.

On March 7, 2015, Domoto played Kazumi Ishioka in his first drama in nearly eight years in Tensai Tantei Mitarai Nankai Jiken File: Kasa o Oru Onna, which was an adaptation of Soji Shimada's Detective Kiyoshi Mitarai Series. On September 13, 2015, he played Minamoto no Hiromasa in Onmyōji. To commemorate the 20th anniversary of KinKi Kids, the sequel of 1997 drama Bokura no Yūki Miman City was broadcast as a special drama Bokura no Yūki Miman City: 2017 in NTV, where Domoto reprised his role.

=== Music ===
In the early days after KinKi Kids debuted, Domoto had several solo songs credited as KinKi Kids in their albums. He held his first solo concert tour in 2004, mainly performing his solo songs in group albums and songs from SHOCK. On January 11, 2006, he released his first CD album Koichi Domoto「Endless Shock」Original Sound Track, but was not regarded as his solo debut. The album peaked in Oricon and became the first musical soundtrack album to reach No.1, winning the Soundtrack album of the year in 21st Japan Gold Disc Award. He made his official CD debut on July 12, 2006, with a release of single Deep in your heart/+MILLION but -LOVE, followed by the release of album Mirror on September 13.

On April 30, 2008, Domoto released a new single No More under the name of "Tsukasa Maizu"; the character he played in Sushi Ōji!, as the theme song of the movie Ginmaku Ban Sushi Ōji!: New York e Iku. His second single Ayakashi was released on July 29, 2009. On September 1, 2010, Domoto released BPM, his first solo album in four years. On October 3, 2012, Domoto released his third solo album Gravity, which ranked the first in Oricon. Domoto released his first DVD/Blu-ray single INTERACTIONAL/SHOW ME UR MONSTER on June 10, 2015, followed by his fourth solo album Spiral on July 8. On April 19, 2017, the second original soundtrack of his musicalEndless SHOCK was released. On June 2, 2021, Domoto released his fifth solo album PLAYFUL and topped in Oricon. The album also featured a collaboration short movie made by Square Enix, in which Domoto himself and a CG version of him starred together.

Domoto wrote his first song in KinKi Kids's music variety LOVE LOVE Aishiteru in 1997, where they were required to learn guitar and write songs. Since then, he wrote a great number of songs, mainly devoted to the group, his solo work and musical SHOCK. He composed several No.1 winning singles for KinKi Kids and himself, such as Suki ni Natteku Aishitteku (2000), Deep in your heart (2006), Family ~Hitotsu ni Naru Koto (2010) and Topaz Love (2018). In 2002, Domoto wrote the lyrics for and composed KinKi Kids' single Solitude ~Hontou no Sayonara~, which was also the theme song for his drama Remote, under the pen name "K．Dino". The single also reached No.1 in Oricon and won the best theme song in the 35th Drama Academy Award. The song Ai no Katamari of KinKi Kids he composed in 2001 was voted as the most loved song by fans in an official voting held for creation of KinKi Kids's 10th anniversary compilation album 39 in 2007. He composed various songs used in his musical Endless SHOCK. Domoto has also provided songs for other artists from Johnny & Associates, such as NEWS, Hideaki Takizawa, and the musical DREAM BOYS.

== Discography ==
=== Studio albums ===
List of studio albums with peak chart positions
Title	Album details	Peak chart positions	
Title	Album details	JPN	KOR
Mirror	Released: September 13, 2006; Label: Johnny's Entertainment	1	—
BPM	Released: September 1, 2010; Label: Johnny's Entertainment	2	21
Gravity	Released: October 3, 2012; Label: Johnny's Entertainment	1	—
Spiral	Released: July 8, 2015; Label: Johnny's Entertainment	2	—
Playful	Released: June 2, 2021; Label: Johnny's Entertainment	1	—
Raise	Released: September 10, 2025; Label: ELOV-Label	1	—

=== Soundtrack albums ===
List of soundtrack albums with peak chart positions
Title	Album details	Peak chart positions
Title	Album details	JPN
Endless Shock Original Sound Track	Released: January 11, 2006; Label: Johnny's Entertainment	1
Endless Shock Original Sound Track 2	Released: April 19, 2017; Label: Johnny's Entertainment	1

=== Singles ===
List of singles with peak chart positions
Title	Year	Peak chart positions	Album
Title	Year	JPN	Album
"Deep in your heart/+MILLION but -LOVE"	2006	1	Mirror
"No More"	2008	1	Sushi Ōji! Soundtrack
"Ayakashi" (妖 ～あやかし～)	2009	1	BPM

=== Video albums ===
List of video albums with peak chart positions
Title	Album details	Peak chart positions	
Title	Album details	JPN DVD	JPN Blu.
Koichi Domoto Live Tour 2004 1/2	Released: October 14, 2004; Label: Johnny's Entertainment; Formats: DVD, VHS	1	—
Koichi Domoto Concert Tour 2006 Mirror: The Music Mirrors My Feeling	Released: May 16, 2007; Label: Johnny's Entertainment; Formats: DVD	1	—
Koichi Domoto Concert Tour 2010 BPM	Released: March 9, 2011; Label: Johnny's Entertainment; Formats: DVD, Blu-ray	1	8
Koichi Domoto Concert Tour 2012 "Gravity"	Released: July 3, 2013; Label: Johnny's Entertainment; Formats: DVD, Blu-ray	1	—
Interactional/Show Me Ur Monster	Released: June 10, 2015; Label: Johnny's Entertainment; Formats: DVD, Blu-ray	1	1
Koichi Domoto Live Tour 2015 Spiral	Released: May 11, 2016; Label: Johnny's Entertainment; Formats: DVD, Blu-ray	1	1

==== Shock video albums ====
List of video albums with peak chart positions
Title	Album details	Peak chart positions	
Title	Album details	JPN DVD	JPN Blu.
Koichi Domoto Shock Digest	Released: June 19, 2002; Label: Johnny's Entertainment; Formats: DVD, VHS	1	—
Koichi Domoto Shock	Released: January 16, 2003; Label: Johnny's Entertainment; Formats: DVD, VHS	2	—
Endless Shock	Released: February 16, 2006; Label: Johnny's Entertainment; Formats: DVD	1	—
Endless Shock 2008	Released: October 29, 2008; Label: Johnny's Entertainment; Formats: DVD	1	—
Document of Endless Shock 2012: Ashita no Butai e	Released: February 6, 2013; Label: Johnny's Entertainment; Formats: DVD	1	—
Endless Shock 2012	Released: September 18, 2013; Label: Johnny's Entertainment; Formats: DVD, Blu-ray	2	1
Endless Shock 1000th Performance Anniversary	Released: September 17, 2014; Label: Johnny's Entertainment; Formats: DVD, Blu-ray	1	1

== Solo activities ==
=== Concerts and events ===
- KOICHI DOMOTO LIVE TOUR 2004 1/2 (Concert tour; March 29 – June 5, 2004)
- KOICHI DOMOTO Presents IT LOOKS BACK UPON 1/2 (Event; November 1, 2004)
- KOICHI DOMOTO CONCERT TOUR 2006 "mirror" 〜The Music Mirrors My Feeling〜 (Concert tour; September 13 – October 3, 2006)
- KOICHI DOMOTO CONCERT TOUR 2009 Best Performance And Music (Concert tour; August 15 – October 12, 2009)
- KOICHI DOMOTO CONCERT TOUR 2010 BPM (Concert tour; September 11 – November 14, 2010)
- KOICHI DOMOTO 2011 BPM Concerts in Seoul, Taipei (Concert tour in Korea and Taiwan; September 9 – October 2, 2011)
- KOICHI DOMOTO 2012 "Gravity" (Concert tour; September 23 – December 16, 2012)
- KOICHI DOMOTO LIVE TOUR 2015 Spiral (Concert tour; July 12 – August 21, 2015)
- KOICHI DOMOTO LIVE TOUR 2021 PLAYFUL (Concert tour; June 20 – August 12, 2021)
- KOICHI DOMOTO LIVE TOUR 2025 RAISE (Concert tour; October 4 – November 6, 2025)

=== Television (as personality) ===
Year	Title	Role	Note
1995–2020	Music Station	Performer	116 episodes (as KinKi Kids); 11 episodes (as Koichi Domoto)
1997	Chichi Papa Oyaji! Musume o Tanomude!	Regular	
1999–2001	Pika Ichi	Host	
2000–2002	Pop Jam	Host, Performer	
2001–2002	Japan Walker	Host	
2002	Generation Jungle	Host	
2002–2003	Generation!	Host	
2003–2004	Yū Waku Aso Biba	Host	
2004–2007	Generation!!	Host	
2005	Domoto Koichi no Micha Dame	Host	
2007	Kiseki no En	Host	TV special
2008	Domoto Koichi PRESENTS 10 Things To Know Before Death	Host	TV special
2008–2012	Domoto Koichi no Unlucky Kenkyūjyo	Host	
2010	Domoto Koichi All for Stage	Himself	Special documentary of SHOCK
2012	Domoto Koichi no NEWS LABO	Host	TV special
2012	Mars Adventure!~Discover Livings Outside Earth~	Host	TV special
2012	Mars Adventure Is there life?	Host	TV special
2012–2014	Chokotto Science	Host	
2018	Kochan, do you want to try this?	Host	
2018–2019	SONGS	Himself	2 episodes (documentary)

=== Television (as actor) ===
Year	Title	Role	Note
1993	Aiyo Nemuranaide		TV special
1994	Ningen Shikkaku	Ryuka Kageyama	
1995	Ie Naki Ko 2	Harumi Makimura	Main
1995	Kinyō Entertainment "Honoo No Ryouri-Nin"	Fude Zhou	Lead; TV special
1995	Mokuyō No Kaidan "Mario"	Mario	Lead; TV special
1996	Papa Kaeru 96	Koutaro Fukuhara	Main; TV Special
1996	Ginrō Kaiki File: Futatsu No Nō Wo Motsu Shōnen	Ginrō Fuwa/Kōsuke Fuwa	Lead; Two characters
1996	Wakaba no Koro	Kai Fujiki	Lead
1996	Shin Mokuyō no Kaidan "Cyborg"	Akira Kaidō	Lead
1997	24-Hour Television "Yūki To Iu Koto"	Kazuo Tamura	Lead; TV Special
1997	Tsuya Sugata! Kouzaburō Shichihenge	Kōzaburo Naniwaya	Lead; TV Special
1997	Bokura no Yūki Miman City	Yamato	Lead
1998	Harmonia: Kono Ai No Hate	Hideyuki Azumano	Lead
1999	P.S. Genki Desu, Shunpei	Sunpei Kaji	Lead
2000	Tenshi ga Kieta Machi	Tatsuro Takano	Lead
2001	Rookie!	Makoto Aida	Lead
2002	Remote	Kōzaburo Himuro	Main
2006	Tales of The Unusual 2006 Autumn Special Drama: Kinō Kōen	Yōsuke Endō	Lead
2007	Sushi Ōji!	Tsukasa Maizu	Lead
2015	Tensai Tantei Mitarai Nankai Jiken File: Kasa o Oru Onna	Kazumi Ishioka	Main; TV Special
2015	Onmyōji	Minamoto no Hiromasa	Main; TV Special
2017	Bokura no Yūki Miman City 2017	Yamato Shindō	Lead; TV special; Sequel of the 1997 drama

=== Anime ===
- Jyu Oh Sei (Fuji TV: May 18, 2006 – June 22, 2006)
- That Time I Got Reincarnated as a Slime the Movie: Tears of the Azure Sea (February 27, 2026)

=== Movies ===
- 200X Nen Shō (Humax: November 14, 1992)
- Shoot! (Shochiku: March 12, 1994)
- Ie Naki Ko (Toho: December 17, 1994)
- Ginmaku Ban Sushi Ōji!: New York e Iku (Warner Bros.: April 19, 2008)
- Endless SHOCK (Toho: February 1, 2021)

=== Musicals ===
- Another (August 6, 1993 - August 24, 1993)
- Mask'99 (January 6, 1999 - January 31, 1993)
- SHOCK series
  - MILLENNIUM SHOCK (November 2–26, 2000: 38 shows): Lead Role
  - SHOW 劇・SHOCK (December 1, 2001 - January 7, 2002; June 4–28, 2002: 114 shows): Lead Role
  - SHOCK is Real Shock (January 8 - February 25, 2003: 76 shows): Lead Role
  - Shocking SHOCK (February 6–29, 2004: 38 shows): Lead Role
  - Endless SHOCK (2005 -): Lead Role
- Knights' Tale (July 27 – October 15, 2018; 8 September - 30 November 2021): Lead role
- Charlie and the Chocolate Factory (October 2023 - April 2026): Willy Wonka

=== Dubbing ===
- Rush, James Hunt (Chris Hemsworth)

== Publications ==
=== Book ===
- When I become a fan (January 20, 2011; Sony Magazines) ISBN 978-4-7897-3449-3 (compiled and edited from Domoto's serial F1 hymn in GRAND PRIX SPECIAL specialized magazine)
- When I become a fan 2 (March 14, 2013; M-ON! Entertainment Inc.) ISBN 978-4-7897-3598-8 (compiled and edited from Domoto's serial F1 hymn in GRAND PRIX SPECIAL specialized magazine)
- The Entertainer Case (February 14, 2016; Nikkei Business Publications, Inc.) ISBN 978-4-8222-7272-2 (compiled and edited from Domoto's serial The Entertainer Case in Nikkei Entertainment magazine)

=== Serial ===
- F1 hymn「F1賛歌」in GRAND PRIX SPECIAL (February 2006 – January 2016)
- Speed of Light Corner「光速コーナー」in Tokyo Chunichi Sports (2007 – December 1, 2012; 2017 –)
- Domoto Koichi's Endless Days「Endless Days 〜堂本光一のオワラナイ日々〜」in Susumeru Pia! (February – December 2012)
- The Entertainer Case「エンタテイナーの条件」in Nikkei Entertainment (September 2013 –)
- Domoto Koichi – 0.1 second ecstasy「堂本光一 コンマ一秒の恍惚」in Weekly Playboy (October 2016 –)

== Awards ==
- 2002: 6th Nikkan Sports Drama Grand Prix: Best Supporting Actor for Remote
- 2003: 35th Television Drama Academy Awards (Winter): Best Supporting Actor for Remote
- 2008: 33rd Kikuta Kazuo Drama Award: Grand Prize Award for high achievements in stage performance (together with Endless SHOCK staff and cast)
- 2020: 45th Kikuta Kazuo Drama Award: Grand Prize Award
