= Tsuyoshi Domoto =

- 堂本 剛
- Born: April 10, 1979 (age 47); Nara, Nara, Japan
- Other names: 244 Endli-x, Endlicheri☆Endlicheri
- Occupations: Singer-songwriter; television personality
- Years active: 1987–present
- Spouse: Kanako Momota (m. 2024)
- Musical career
- Genres: Pop; rock; funk; jazz; blues; soul
- Instruments: Vocals; guitar; bass guitar; piano; drums
- Label: ELOV-Labels
- Member of: Domoto
- Formerly of: J-Friends; Toraji Haiji
- Website: Official website

Tsuyoshi Domoto (堂本 剛, Dōmoto Tsuyoshi; born April 10, 1979) is a Japanese idol, singer, songwriter, actor, and television personality. Along with Koichi Domoto (with whom he has no blood-relation), he is a member of Domoto, which is a Japanese duo under the management of Starto Entertainment (formerly of Johnny & Associates) and the record holder of Guinness World Records for having the record of the most consecutive number-one singles since their debut single.

== Early life ==
Domoto was born in Nara. He has a sister, older by six years.

== Career ==
On February 22, 2024, Domoto announced via the fan club site that he would be leaving the agency on March 31. Days later, on his radio program "Domoto Tsuyoshi to Fashion and Music Book", he announced to the public his decision. One of the reasons for seeking his independence was his health, with priority for his hearing. According to Domoto, the doctor in charge said, "I think there is a need to change the environment significantly". He has been talking about his condition on the program, receiving messages from listeners who are battling illness themselves. That particular day, he received a message from a fan in his 80s, who was left paralyzed by a cerebral hemorrhage, and a man in his 40s, sentenced to six months to live. While addressing the listeners fighting illnesses, he was also telling himself, "I will never give up until the very end". Through such heart-to-heart exchanges, Tsuyoshi Domoto must have become more convinced that he only has one life, and that he must take care of himself. Tsuyoshi Domoto (the man) has not given up on Tsuyoshi Domoto (the artist). He also announced it in his Instagram, after deleting all his previous posts. "Regarding my personal activities, I have decided to terminate my contract with my agency on March 31, 2024 at the time of renewal and move on to a new field of life" "I felt that I needed to make a big change in my environment in order to continue my life as an artist", is part of the message he shared there. Regarding the activities of Kinki Kids and his relationship with Koichi, he said on the program "Kinki Kids donnamonya" that they had been talking about the ways to continue working together, not considering disbanding as a solution. Of course there was concern about the fans, and he stated it. "There will be new forms between us and our fans. However, the time we create (together) will have to change in order to continue. I think that's a very positive thing, and I don't think it's a problem if something changes. I think there's a future that we can walk towards because we're all part of it", he said, hopeful that the change will also reach the fans's future selves. Koichi Domoto had also shared his feelings about his partner's decision on the 22, saying "We will continue to deliver on our activities. Until now, KinKi Kids has continued activities while taking Tsuyoshi's health into consideration. There were some wonderful works and moving performances that were created because of these hardships. With Tsuyoshi's decision to continue his individual activities in a new field, expectations are high that the resolution of "what we want to express as KinKi Kids" will become clearer."

=== Early career ===
Domoto joined Johnny's Entertainment on May 5, 1991, which also the first time he met his future bandmate Koichi Domoto. The opportunity came while without his knowing, his mother and his sister sent his resume to the office. Domoto and his bandmate Koichi Domoto first worked together as backdancers for Hikaru Genji, who were holding a concert at Yokohama Arena, and has since then been partnered up for magazine photoshoots, music acts and drama projects. The duo starred in their first drama together called Ningen Shikkaku in 1994, in which Domoto was awarded Best Newcomer in the Television Drama Academy Awards.

=== Debut ===
With Koichi Domoto, he eventually made his debut in 1997 as KinKi Kids with a double release of a single "Garasu no Shōnen" and an album A Album, both of which went on to sell more than a million copies.

=== Solo musical career ===
On May 29, 2002, Domoto released his first solo single, "Machi/Dekiai Logic", in which he penned and composed all the tracks. The single was used as the theme song for Domoto's lead-role drama Yume no California and it reached number 1 in the weekly chart. In the following month, Domoto started his career as an illustrator by publishing a book in collaboration with writer Shizuka Iziyuuin. They collaborated again for another book in 2003.

In 2006, Domoto put his acting career on hold and focused more on his music career. He began to release his solo work under the project name Endlicheri-Endlicheri. During his Endlicheri-Endlicheri era, Domoto released three singles which all topped the weekly charts and made him the second male soloist after Masahiko Kondo to have achieved five consecutive number one singles. He then renamed his solo project 244 Endli-x (pronounced "Tsuyoshi Endorikkusu") in 2008. He announced that he would go on his first concert tour as 244 Endli-x soon after, which began on March 29, 2008, at the Yokohama Arena and ended in Sendai on May 8, 2008.

Domoto once again changed his solo project name in 2009 to Tsuyoshi (剛紫) and simultaneously released a single and an album on his birthday, April 10. In the same year, he released another single, "Rain", on September 9, which topped the Oricon Single Weekly Charts.

On April 6, 2011, Domoto released his ninth single, "Eni o Yuite", which was recorded at shrines believed to have connections to Nara's entertainment and music industries. Another single, "Niji no Uta", was released in September 2011.

He returned to the stage after a 4-month hiatus, participating in the music festival "TV Asahi Dream Festival 2017" with Koichi on the 29th of October.

Domoto, once again changing his name to Endrecheri, released a new full-length studio album titled "Naralien" on August 14, 2019. The album featured lead track "4 10 cake (Hot Cake) and brand new songs “FUNK TRON”, “Heki”, and “PURPLE FIRE”. Remakes of his older songs “Believe in intuition…” & “NIPPON” were also included. The album was released in three versions. Limited Edition A included a DVD containing the music video for the Album's lead track “4 10 cake (Hot cake)” and footage from ENDRECHERI's performance at SUMMER SONIC 2018, while the Limited Edition B is packaged with a second DVD which includes an hour-long video centering around Tsuyoshi and his band members. The album charted #1 on the Oricon weekly Albums chart. In the video for "4 10 cake (Hot Cake)", Domoto is seen singing and dancing with various different dancers including Japanese Choreographer Riehata.

On May 13, 2026, it was revealed that Domoto had attended Arashi's final tour "We are Arashi" concert in Osaka and was so moved by the rainbow–like ambiance typical of Arashi's concerts, that it inspired his new song "Heart of Rainbow", a message to the group and their fans, with feelings of 'thank you' and 'gratitude'. Their relationship started in 1997, when KinKi Kids (now Domoto) debuted with "Garasu no shōnen". Kazunari Ninomiya (who calls him "big brother") and Masaki Aiba, both 14 years old and Johnny's Jr. members at the time, were backup dancers. In 2017, when he had to stop activities due to sudden hearing loss, Aiba and Jun Matsumoto performed "Aisareru yori aishitai" together with Koichi Domoto on a TV music program. Matsumoto took over the lead role in the Kindaichi drama after Domoto. And Satoshi Ohno, early in his career, referenced Domoto's dance form. An entertainment insider said about the song that Domoto, rather than viewing Arashi's end of activities negatively, sent the "rainbow" as a message of encouragement for an even brighter future, celebrating the new beginnings of each of the five members.

=== Acting career ===
Domoto appeared in the 2003 drama Moto Kare, in which he co-starred for the second time with Ryōko Hirosue after their hit drama Summer Snow in 2000.

In April 2004, Domoto provided the theme song for his lead-role drama Home Drama!.

In 2005 Domoto acted in a movie, Fantastipo, with fellow Johnny's personality Taichi Kokubun with whom he paired to form the temporary unit Toraji Haiji to release the theme song for the movie.

Domoto starred in Hoshi ni Negai o (a.k.a. Wish Upon A Star), a TV drama produced by Disney and Fuji TV based on the true story of planetarium engineer Takayuki Ohira who designed Megastar II – the world's most advanced planetarium projector.

=== Other ===
In 2004, he won the 'Best Jeanist' award.

Domoto announced in 2009 his collaboration with the hat brand CA4LA.

Known as the fashion leader with unique style, Domoto was chosen by the sports brand Adidas Originals to be the image character for its new campaign BE Originals that start on February 12, 2010.

At the end of April 2008, Domoto was appointed to be the first special ambassador for Nara tourism.

== Personal life ==
On June 28, 2017, it was revealed that Domoto would be hospitalized for one week after experiencing sudden deafness, otherwise known as sudden sensorineural hearing loss. Due to this, he was unable to attend TV Tokyo's “Ongakusai 2017” broadcast on the same date with bandmate Koichi. He was released the following week and was instructed to continue outpatient recovery. Although he's been treated, Domoto will never recover fully. He has been using earphones when appearing in music programs because of it.

On January 11, 2024, Domoto and Momoiro Clover Z member Kanako Momota announced their marriage.

== Filmography ==
=== Film ===
Title	Year	Role	Notes	Ref.
Jotei: Kasuga no Tsubone	1990	Shichinojō	Credited as Naohiro Domoto	
Shanghai Mermaid Legend Murder Case	1997	Hajime Kindaichi	Lead role	
Fantastipo	2005	Haiji Koinobori	Lead role	
Heianyūki	2012	Himself	Documentary	
Gintama	2017	Shinsuke Takasugi		
Gintama 2	2018	Shinsuke Takasugi		
Maru	2024	Sawada	Lead role	

=== Television ===
As an actor

Title	Year(s)	Role	Notes	Ref
Karin	1994	Kazunori Tagami	2 episodes	
Ningen Shikkaku	1994	Makoto Ōba	Main role (12 episodes)	
Ai to Yabō no Dokuganryū	1994	Botenmaru	Television film	
Second Chance	1995−1996	Wataru Fujii	Main role (24 episodes)	
Ie Naki Ko	1995	Hajime Kindaichi	Episode: "Goodbye Ie Naki Ko"	
The Kindaichi Case Files	1995−1997	Hajime Kindaichi	Lead role (17 episodes); 3 television specials	
Dareka ga Dareka ni Koishiteru	1996	Fuyuki Kawamura	Main role (television special)	
Wakaba no Koro	1996	Takeshi Aizawa	Lead role (12 episodes)	
Bokura no Yūki: Miman City	1997, 2017	Takeru Takigawa	Lead role (10 episodes); Television special	
Ao no Jidai	1998	Ryū Asaka	Lead role (11 episodes)	
Kimi to Ita Mirai no Tame ni	1999	Atsushi Horigami	Lead role (10 episodes)	
To Heart	1999	Yūji Tokieda	Lead role (12 episodes)	
P.S. Genki desu, Shunpei	1999	Yūji Tokieda	Episode: "Missed Love..."	
Summer Snow	2000	Natsuo Shinoda	Lead role (11 episodes)	
Mukai Arata no Dōbutsu Nikki	2001	Arata Mukai	Lead role (10 episodes)	
Rookie	2001	Shoplifter	Episode: "Goodbye Rookie Detective"	
Gakko no Sensei	2001	Sentarō Sakuragi	Lead role (11 episodes)	
Yume no California	2002	Shū Yamazaki	Lead role (11 episodes)	
Moto Kare	2003	Haratsugu Kashiwaba	10 episodes	
Home Drama!	2004	Shōgo Isaka	Lead role (11 episodes)	
Last Present	2005	Kenji Kanzaki	Lead role (television special)	
Hoshi ni Negai o	2005	Takayuki Ohira	Lead role (television special)	
33-pun Tantei	2008−2009	Rokurō Kurama	Lead role (13 episodes); 1 television special	
Tenma-san ga Yuku	2013	Tenma Hokkai	Lead role (10 episodes)	
Platonic	2014	Young Man	Lead role (8 episodes)	
Domoto Tsuyoshi no Moto	2018	Himself	Documentary series (6 episodes)	

As a personality

Title	Year(s)	Role	Network	Notes	Ref(s)
Naruhodo! The World	1995	Cast member	Fuji TV		
Domoto Tsuyoshi no Do-Ya	1996−1997	Host	ABC		
Tsuyo-chan Dō Honpo	1999	Host	NTV		
Domoto Tsuyoshi no Shojiki Shindoi	2002−2009	Host	TV Asahi		
24 Ch△nnel	2009−2010	Host	TV Asahi		
Domoto Tsuyoshi no Yakara ne	2014−2018	Host	MBS	15 episodes	
Tokyo Live 22-ji	2014−2015	Host	TV Tokyo		

=== Japanese dub ===
Title	Year	Role	Voice dub for	Ref.
Rush	2014	Niki Lauda	Daniel Brühl	

== Books ==
- 2002: Kimi to arukeba (Story by: Shizuka Iziyuuin, Illustration by: Domoto Tsuyoshi, Published by: Asahi Shimbun)
- 2003: Zuutto isshou. (Story by: Shizuka Iziyuuin, Illustration by: Domoto Tsuyoshi, Published by: Asahi Shimbun)
- 2005: Boku no Kutsu oto (Compilation of Domoto Tsuyoshi writing that serialize in Myojo from 1999 to 2005, Published by: Shueisha)
- 2006: Shoujiki I LOVE YOU (First Solo Photo-book, Published by: Tokyo Shimbun)
- 2009: Domoto Tsuyoshi to Atama no Naka (FINEBOYS Special Fashion Book, Published by: Hinode Publishing)
- 2010: Berlin (Published by: Shogakukan)
- 2014: Kokoro no Hanashi (Published by: KADOKAWA)

== Concerts ==
Title	Tour date	Project name
Tsuyoshi Domoto: Rosso e Azzurro	July 24, 2002 – August 14, 2002	Tsuyoshi Domoto
Tsuyoshi Domoto 2nd LIVE [si:] -FIRST LINE-	August 11, 2004 – September 5, 2004	Tsuyoshi Domoto
The Rainbow Star	March 19, 2006 – October 29, 2006	ENDLICHERI☆ENDLICHERI
ENDLICHERI☆ENDLICHERI presents Funky Party 2007: Sparkling Love	February 23, 2007 – March 4, 2007	ENDLICHERI☆ENDLICHERI
ENDLICHERI☆ENDLICHERI presents Funky Party 2007: Neo Africa Rainbow Ax	March 16, 2007 – June 24, 2007	ENDLICHERI☆ENDLICHERI
ENDLICHERI☆ENDLICHERI presents LOVE☆Event HIGHER in JAPAN!!!	June 22, 2007, June 25, 2007	ENDLICHERI☆ENDLICHERI
ENDLICHERI☆ENDLICHERI presents 244ENDLI-x LIVE TOUR '08 "I and Ai"	March 29, 2008 – May 25, 2008	244 Endli-x
ENDLICHERI☆ENDLICHERI Presents WATERIZE	May 26, 2008	244 Endli-x
Biware Sora – Bigaku: My Beautiful Sky Tour	April 9, 2009 – June 25, 2009	Tsuyoshi
2009 Yakushiji LIVE	July 10, 2009 – July 11, 2009	Tsuyoshi Domoto
ENDLICHERI☆ENDLICHERI LIVE "CHERI 4 U"	August 15, 2009 – August 20, 2009, October 3, 2009 – November 29, 2009	ENDLICHERI☆ENDLICHERI
Rakuten Sekaiisan Gekijou 13th Asuka Ishibutai	May 14, 2010	Tsuyoshi Domoto
Yakushiji LIVE 2010	July 9, 2010 – July 10, 2010	Tsuyoshi Domoto
ENDLICHERI☆ENDLICHERI LIVE "CHERI E"	August 8, 2010 – August 29, 2010	ENDLICHERI☆ENDLICHERI
Heianjingu LIVE 2010	October 6, 2010 – October 7, 2010	Tsuyoshi Domoto
Tsuyoshi Domoto LIVE Junin Toiro	June 3, 2011 – June 5, 2011, September 16, 2011 – September 18, 2011	Tsuyoshi Domoto
Heianjingu LIVE 2011	September 2, 2011 & September 4, 2011	Tsuyoshi Domoto
Tsuyoshi Domoto LIVE Junin Toiro – suisei –	October 22, 2011 – October 24, 2011	Tsuyoshi Domoto
LIVE shamanippon -Rakachinotohi-	May 29, 2012 – July 29, 2012	Tsuyoshi Domoto
Tsuyoshi Domoto 2012 Heian Jingu LIVE	September 14, 2012 – September 16, 2012	Tsuyoshi Domoto
KABA Premium Event	May 8, 2013	Tsuyoshi Domoto
Tsuyoshi Domoto 2013 Heian Jingu LIVE	September 13, 2013 – September 15, 2013	Tsuyoshi Domoto
FUNK Shiyoukashiran Live	August 8, 2014 - October 3, 2014	Tsuyoshi Domoto
Tsuyoshi Domoto 2014 Heian Jingu Live	September 5, 2014 - September 7, 2014	Tsuyoshi Domoto
TU FUNK TUOR 2015	July 15, 2015 - October 9, 2015	Tsuyoshi Domoto
Tsuyoshi Domoto 2015 Heian Jingu Live	September 11, 2015 - September 13, 2015	Tsuyoshi Domoto
TU FUNK ALL STARS CON!CER-TU	February 18, 2016 - February 28, 2016	Tsuyoshi Domoto
Tsuyoshi Domoto 2016 Heian Jingu Live	August 26, 2016 - August 28, 2016	Tsuyoshi Domoto

== Awards ==
- 1994: 2nd Television Drama Academy Awards (Summer): Best Newcomer for Ningen Shikkaku
- 1998: 2nd Nikkan Sports Drama Grand Prix (98–99): Best Actor for Ao no Jidai
- 1999: 22nd Television Drama Academy Awards (Summer): Best Actor for To Heart Koishite Shinitai
- 2000: 26th Television Drama Academy Awards (Summer): Best Actor for Summer Snow
- 2004: Best Jeanist of the Year
