= List of Oricon number-one albums =

This is a list of albums that have peaked at number-one on the Oricon Albums Chart, the preeminent singles chart in Japan. Each chart is on a week-ending format. The chart was created on October 5, 1987, and eventually replaced the original LP chart. It monitors the number of physical album purchases of the most popular albums. In December 2018, the company launched a combined albums chart, which focuses on physical, digital, and streaming sales. It follows from the introduction of Oricon’s digital and streaming charts in 2016 and 2018 respectively.

== 1980s ==
- 1987
- 1988
- 1989

== 1990s ==
- 1990
- 1991
- 1992
- 1993
- 1994
- 1995
- 1996
- 1997
- 1998
- 1999

== 2000s ==
- 2000
- 2001
- 2002
- 2003
- 2004
- 2005
- 2006
- 2007
- 2008
- 2009

== 2010s ==
- 2010
- 2011
- 2012
- 2013
- 2014
- 2015
- 2016
- 2017
- 2018
- 2019

== 2020s ==
- 2020
- 2021
- 2022
- 2023
- 2024
- 2025
- 2026

== See also ==
- List of best-selling albums in Japan
- Oricon
- List of Oricon number-one singles
