= 2012 in Japanese music =

Events in 2012 in Japanese music.

== Events ==
- 26th Japan Gold Disc Award
- January 20 – 3rd CD Shop Awards
- June 23 – 2012 MTV Video Music Awards Japan
- October 7 – 6th Animax Anison Grand Prix
- November 14 – 45th Japan Cable Awards
- November 22 – 45th Best Hits Kayosai
- December 5 – 2012 FNS Music Festival
- December 6 – 45th Japan Lyricist Awards
- December 30 – 54th Japan Record Awards

== Charts ==
- List of number-one albums of 2012 (Japan)
- List of Oricon number-one singles of 2012
- List of Hot 100 number-one singles of 2012 (Japan)
- List of number-one digital singles of 2012 (Japan)

== Best-sellers ==
=== Artists ===
The following is a list of the five best-selling music artists in Japan in 2016 by value of sales, including sales of records and of DVDs and Blu-rays, according to Oricon.

Rank	Artist	Total earnings
1	AKB48	¥19.098 billion
2	Exile	¥12.177 billion
3	Arashi	¥10.454 billion
4	Mr. Children	¥9.947 billion
5	Kanjani8	¥4.196 billion

=== Albums ===
The following is a list of the top ten best-selling albums in Japan in 2012, according to Oricon.

Rank	Artist	Album	Sales
1	Mr. Children	Mr. Children 2005–2010 ＜macro＞	1,170,000
2	Mr. Children	Mr. Children 2001–2005 ＜micro＞	1,105,000
3	AKB48	1830m	1,030,000
4	Arashi	Popcorn	848,000
5	Exile / Atsushi	Exile Japan / Solo	767,000
6	Keisuke Kuwata	I Love You: Now and Forever	758,000
7	Kobukuro	All Singles Best 2	694,000
8	Mr. Children	(An Imitation) Blood Orange	613,000
9	Yumi Matsutoya	The Best of Yumi Matsutoya 40th Anniversary	550,000
10	Tatsuro Yamashita	Opus: All Time Best 1975–2012	519,000

== Debuting artists ==
Soloists debuting

- Misaki Iwasa
- Leo Ieiri
- Yūki Kaji
- Nagi Yanagi
- Mayu Watanabe
- Ray
- Daisuke Kishio
- Aoi Yūki
- Tomohisa Sako
- Alma Kaminiito
- Mikako Komatsu
- Konomi Suzuki
- Ayana Taketatsu
- Kana Hanazawa
- Nobuhiko Okamoto
- Rino Sashihara
- Kavka Shishido
- Luna Haruna
- Mai Aizawa
- Machico
- Erena Ono
- Takuma Terashima
- Rina Sumioka
- Kanako Tahara
- Yui Ogura
- Mariko Gotō
- Yumi Hara
- Yutaro Miura
- Sachika Misawa
- Kanako Takatsuki
- Sayoko Izumi
- Zaq
- Sakiko Matsui
- Sayoko Izumi
- Yoshino Nanjō
- Yunchi
- Tomomi Kasai
- Fuku Suzuki
- Shiori Niiyama
- Tia

Groups debuting

Returning from hiatus

- Kobukuro
- Koda Kumi
- Rag Fair
- Tomomi Kahara
- Brief & Trunks
- T-Bolan

== Disbanding in 2012 ==
Disbanding

- GO!GO!7188
- Tokyo Jihen
- Serial TV Drama
- SDN48
- Doping Panda
- School Food Punishment
- Stereopony

Going on hiatus

- Yashiki Takajin
- Remioromen
- Saasa
- Dream Morning Musume
- Chemistry
- Elephant Kashimashi
- Yui
- Nozomi Ōhashi

== See also ==
- 2012 in Japan
- 2012 in Japanese television
- List of Japanese films of 2012
