= List of Oricon number-one albums of 1991 =

The highest-selling albums in Japan are ranked in the weekly Oricon Albums Chart, which is published by Oricon Style magazine. The data are compiled by Oricon based on each albums' weekly physical sales. This list includes the albums that reached the number one place on that chart in 1991. In 1991, 32 albums occupied the peak position on the chart.

Yumi Matsutoya's twenty-second studio album The Gates of Heaven became the best-selling album of 1991 despite not reaching number one during the year. The album achieved two weeks atop the chart in 1990.

== Chart history ==
Issue Date	Album	Artist(s)
January 14	Princess Princess	Princess Princess
January 21	Princess Princess	Princess Princess
January 28	Princess Princess	Princess Princess
February 4	K2C	Kome Kome Club
February 11	K2C	Kome Kome Club
February 18	K2C	Kome Kome Club
February 25	K2C	Kome Kome Club
March 4	Start	Jun Sky Walker(s)
March 11	Green	Midori Karashima
March 18	Mind Universe	Shizuka Kudo
March 25	Green	Midori Karashima
April 1	Yamada Katsute Nai CD	Yamada Katsute Nai Wink Hoka
April 8	Yamada Katsute Nai CD	Yamada Katsute Nai Wink Hoka
April 15	Higher Self	Kyosuke Himuro
April 22	Higher Self	Kyosuke Himuro
April 29	Lindberg IV	Lindberg
May 6	Kome Kome Club	Kome Kome Club
May 13	Kome Kome Club	Kome Kome Club
May 20	Lindberg IV	Lindberg
May 27	Oh! Yeah!	Oda Kazumasa
June 3	Oh! Yeah!	Oda Kazumasa
June 10	Mars	B'z
June 17	Scene II	Aska
June 24	Scene II	Aska
July 1	Artisan	Tatsuro Yamashita
July 8	Washing	Mariko Nagai
July 15	Jealousy	X Japan
July 22	Lucky	Misato Watanabe
July 29	Chou-fleur	Takako Okamura
August 5	Afropia	Kyōko Koizumi
August 12	Afropia	Kyōko Koizumi
August 19	Afropia	Kyōko Koizumi
August 26	Scene II	Aska
September 2	Calendar Girl	Ayumi Nakamura
September 9	Edge of the Knife	Shogo Hamada
September 16	Expo	TMN
September 23	Lluvia	Miki Imai
September 30	Kubojah: Parallel World I	Toshinobu Kubota
October 7	Guitarhythm II	Tomoyasu Hotei
October 14	Revolution	Hideaki Tokunaga
October 21	Tree	Chage and Aska
October 28	Tree	Chage and Aska
November 4	Tree	Chage and Aska
November 11	Extra Flight	Lindberg
November 18	Extra Flight	Lindberg
November 25	Million Kisses	Dreams Come True
December 2	Dawn Purple	Yumi Matsutoya
December 9	In the Life	B'z
December 16	Dolls in Action	Princess Princess
December 23	Japan	Tsuyoshi Nagabuchi
December 30	Japan	Tsuyoshi Nagabuchi
