= List of Oricon number-one albums of 2003 =

These are the Oricon number-one albums of 2003, per the Oricon Albums Chart.

== Chart history ==
Key
†	Indicates best-selling album of 2003

Issue Date	Album	Sales	Artist(s)
January 13	Rainbow	571,027	Ayumi Hamasaki
January 20	Second to None †	1,075,872	Chemistry
January 27	Second to None †	402,109	Chemistry
February 3	Life Is...	351,258	Ken Hirai
February 10	Valenti	615,218	BoA
February 17	Valenti	222,851	BoA
February 24	Styles of Beyond	145,102	Exile
March 3	Kalk Samen Kuri No Hana	165,316	Ringo Shiina
March 10	Kalk Samen Kuri No Hana	136,214	Ringo Shiina
March 17	200 km/h in the Wrong Lane	64,503	t.A.T.u.
March 24	A Ballads	561,127	Ayumi Hamasaki
March 31	Sumire	256,327	Yuzu
April 7	No. 5	122,136	Morning Musume.
April 14	Many Pieces	53,715	Every Little Thing
April 21	200 km/h in the Wrong Lane	47,857	t.A.T.u.
April 28	Street Story	106,278	HY
May 5	Street Story	103,245	HY
May 12	Street Story	93,736	HY
May 19	Street Story	86,912	HY
May 26	Keep On Fighting	90,524	Tsuyoshi Nagabuchi
June 2	200 km/h in the Wrong Lane	61,529	t.A.T.u.
June 9	8 Mile: Music from and Inspired by the Motion Picture	54,216	Various Artists
June 16	8 Mile: Music from and Inspired by the Motion Picture	48,761	Various Artists
June 23	St. Anger	51,416	Metallica
June 30	Between the Lines	361,265	Chemistry
July 7	Smap 016/MIJ	305,268	SMAP
July 14	Between the Lines	66,213	Chemistry
July 21	If I Believe	251,218	Mai Kuraki
July 28	Time to Go	225,671	Rip Slyme
August 4	Harvest	252,812	Dragon Ash
August 11	Yuzu Smile	115,458	Yuzu
August 18	Infinity: Love and Life	75,412	V6
August 25	Beautiful Energy	118,568	Twelve Girls Band
September 1	Beautiful Energy	201,241	Twelve Girls Band
September 8	Magnum Collection "Slow"	211,457	Masaharu Fukuyama
September 15	Nomad Soul	125,645	Chitose Hajime
September 22	Every Best Single 2	281,571	Every Little Thing
September 29	Big Machine	500,237	B'z
October 6	Road of Major	290,751	Road of Major
October 13	Ketsunopolis 3	97,821	Ketsumeishi
October 20	Ketsunopolis 3	290,751	Ketsumeishi
October 27	A.I.R	95,243	Rina Aiuchi
November 3	G Album: 24/7	242,826	KinKi Kids
November 10	Longtime Favorites	143,218	Mariya Takeuchi
November 17	Love	437,218	Mika Nakashima
November 24	Love	213,517	Mika Nakashima
December 1	Best Album 2001-2003	155,768	Kick the Can Crew
December 8	Akatsuki no Love Letter	232,422	Aiko
December 15	Exile Entertainment	395,257	Exile
December 22	Exile Entertainment	195,741	Exile
December 29	Memorial Address	524,028	Ayumi Hamasaki

== Annual ==
- Number-one album of 2003: Second to None by Chemistry.
- Most weeks at number-one: HY with a total of 4 weeks.

== See also ==
- 2003 in music
