= List of Oricon number-one albums of 1993 =

These are the Oricon number one albums of 1993, per the Oricon Albums Chart.

== Chart history ==
Key
†	Indicates best-selling album of 1993

Issue Date	Album	Artist(s)
January 11	Flow into Space	Miki Imai
January 18	Memories of Blue	Kyosuke Himuro
January 25	Memories of Blue	Kyosuke Himuro
February 1	Bee-Beep	Princess Princess
February 8	The Bodyguard	Whitney Houston
February 15	Memories of Blue	Kyosuke Himuro
February 22	Stick Out	The Blue Hearts
March 1	The Bodyguard	Whitney Houston
March 8	Encounter	Sing Like Talking
March 15	Steps	Keizo Nakanishi
March 22	Bokutachi No Shippai	Doji Morita
March 29	Anti-Heroine	Mari Hamada
April 5	Anti-Heroine	Mari Hamada
April 12	Heart	Eikichi Yazawa
April 19	Single Is Best	Eri Hiramatsu
April 26	Toki no Tobira	Wands
May 3	Toki no Tobira	Wands
May 10	Toki no Tobira	Wands
May 17	Toki no Tobira	Wands
May 24	Yakusoku no Hi: Vol.1	Yutaka Ozaki
May 31	Springman	Unicorn
June 7	Heart of Stone	T-Bolan
June 14	Heart of Stone	T-Bolan
June 21	Heart of Stone	T-Bolan
June 28	Roman no Natsu	Tube
July 5	Roman no Natsu	Tube
July 12	Roman no Natsu	Tube
July 19	Yureru Omoi †	Zard
July 26	Yureru Omoi †	Zard
August 2	Big Wave	Misato Watanabe
August 9	Yureru Omoi †	Zard
August 16	Yureru Omoi †	Zard
August 23	Yureru Omoi †	Zard
August 30	Classix 1	TMN
September 6	Art of Life	X Japan
September 13	1/2&1/2	Anri
September 20	Sono Eien no Ichibyō ni	Shōgo Hamada
September 27	Under the Sun	Yōsui Inoue
October 4	The Baddest II	Toshinobu Kubota
October 11	The Baddest II	Toshinobu Kubota
October 18	Red Hill	Chage and Aska
October 25	Red Hill	Chage and Aska
November 1	Calling	Masaharu Fukuyama
November 8	Self Portrait	Noriyuki Makihara
November 15	Captain of the Ship	Tsuyoshi Nagabuchi
November 22	Ivory II	Miki Imai
November 29	Extra Flight II	Lindberg
December 6	U-miz	Yumi Matsutoya
December 13	Magic	Dreams Come True
December 20	Magic	Dreams Come True
December 27	Magic	Dreams Come True
