= One by One =

One by One may refer to:

== Film and television ==
- One by One (2004 film), a Disney animated short film
- One by One (1968 film), a western film directed by Rafael R. Marchent
- One by One (1975 film), documentary about the deadliness of Grand Prix racing
- One by One (TV series), a 1980s UK television drama

== Music ==
=== Albums ===
- One by One (Art Blakey album), 1981
- One by One (Foo Fighters album), 2002
- One by One (The Impressions album), 1965
- One by One, a 1960 album by The Coasters
- One by One, a 1971 album by The Free Design
- One X One, 2004 album by Chemistry

=== Songs ===
- "One by One" (Cher song), 1996
- "One by One" (Kitty Wells and Red Foley song), 1954
- "One by One" (Peter Gabriel song), 2026
- "One by One", a song by Alter Bridge from Blackbird
- "One by One", a song by Bleeding Through from The Great Fire
- "One by One", a song by Chumbawamba from Tubthumper
- "One by One", a song by Enya from A Day Without Rain
- "One by One", a song by Hootie & the Blowfish from Musical Chairs
- "One by One", a song by Immortal from Sons of Northern Darkness
- "One by One", a song by Laza Morgan
- "One by One", a song by Lebo M. from The Lion King
- "One by One", a song by Looking Glass from Looking Glass
- "One by One", a song by the Mighty Lemon Drops from World Without End
- "One by One", a song by The Ting Tings from Sounds from Nowheresville
- "One by One", a song by Unkle Bob from Sugar & Spite
- "One by One", a song by We Came as Romans from All Is Beautiful... Because We're Doomed
- "One by One", a song with lyrics by Woody Guthrie and music by Jeff Tweedy, first recorded by Billy Bragg and Wilco on the album Mermaid Avenue
- "One by One", a song from the soundtrack of Ballroom, performed by Lynn Roberts and Bernie Knee

== See also ==
- One Times One (disambiguation)
