= List of Oricon number-one albums of 1995 =

These are the Oricon number one albums of 1995, per the Oricon Albums Chart.

== Chart history ==
Key
†	Indicates best-selling album of 1995

Issue Date	Album	Artist(s)
January 2	Merry Christmas	Mariah Carey
January 16	Cool	SMAP
January 23	Atomic Heart	Mr. Children
January 30	Singles – Flight Recorder II	Lindberg
February 6	Bumpin' Voyage	Toshinobu Kubota
February 13	Bumpin' Voyage	Toshinobu Kubota
February 20	Junjou Karen Otome Moyou	Yuki Uchida
February 27	Guitarhythm Forever Vol. 1	Tomoyasu Hotei
March 6	Decade	Kome Kome Club
March 13	Never End	Aska
March 20	Forever You	Zard
March 27	Forever You	Zard
April 3	Delicious †	Dreams Come True
April 10	Dance to Positive	TRF
April 17	Dance to Positive	TRF
April 24	Delicious †	Dreams Come True
May 1	Dance to Positive	TRF
May 8	Piece Of My Soul	Wands
May 15	Piece Of My Soul	Wands
May 22	Feminism	Kuroyume
May 29	Six/Nine	Buck-Tick
June 5	The Geisha Girls Show	Geisha Girls
June 12	N'	Naomi Tamura
June 19	M Collection: Kaze o Sagashiteru	Masaharu Fukuyama
June 26	These Days	Bon Jovi
July 3	Happy!	Southern All Stars
July 10	Code Name 1: Brother Sun	Chage and Aska
July 17	SMAP 007 – Gold Singer	SMAP
July 24	She Loves You	Misato Watanabe
July 31	La La La	Maki Ohguro
August 7	La La La	Maki Ohguro
August 14	La La La	Maki Ohguro
August 21	Singles	Kyosuke Himuro
August 28	La La La	Maki Ohguro
September 4	Lady Generation	Ryoko Shinohara
September 11	Opus 21	Anri
September 18	Circus	Lenny Kravitz
September 25	Sunshine, Moonlight	Toshinobu Kubota
October 2	Honey	Spitz
October 9	Daydream	Mariah Carey
October 16	Daydream	Mariah Carey
October 23	Field of View I	Field of View
October 30	Dance Tracks Vol. 1	Namie Amuro
November 6	Martini II	Masayuki Suzuki
November 13	Four Seasons	The Yellow Monkey
November 20	Now 3	Various Artists
November 27	Treasures	Tatsuro Yamashita
December 4	Loose	B'z
December 11	Kathmandu	Yumi Matsutoya
December 18	Evergreen	My Little Lover
December 25	Back Beats #1	Maki Ohguro
