= The Way We Are =

The Way We Are may refer to:

- The Way We Are (film), a 2008 Hong Kong drama
- The Way We Are, or Quiet Days in Hollywood, an American drama
- The Way We Are (Chemistry album), 2001
- The Way We Are (Fleming and John album), 1999
- The Way We Are, an album by George Shearing
- "Way We Are" (song), a 2014 song by Kove featuring Melissa Steel
- "The Way We Are" (song), a 2015 song by Alesha Dixon
- The Way We Are, a novel by Allen Wheelis
