= List of Oricon number-one albums of 1992 =

These are the Oricon number one albums of 1992, per the Oricon Albums Chart.

== Chart history ==
Key
†	Indicates best-selling album of 1992

Issue Date	Album	Artist(s)
January 13	Miho's Select	Miho Nakayama
January 20	In the Life	B'z
January 27	Present Pleasure	ZOO
February 3	Sometime Somewhere	Kazumasa Oda
February 10	Sometime Somewhere	Kazumasa Oda
February 17	Sometime Somewhere	Kazumasa Oda
February 24	Fire & Ice	Yngwie Malmsteen
March 2	Bridge	Hound Dog
March 9	Yasashikunaritai	Mariko Nagai
March 16	Birthday	Midori Karashima
March 23	Too Much Love	Kōji Kikkawa
March 30	Koroshi no Shirabe: This Is Not Greatest Hits	Buck-Tick
April 6	Super Best II †	Chage and Aska
April 13	Super Best II †	Chage and Aska
April 20	Super Best II †	Chage and Aska
April 27	Super Best II †	Chage and Aska
May 4	Masterpiece #12	Kyosuke Himuro
May 11	Super Best II †	Chage and Aska
May 18	Hōnetsu e no Akashi	Yutaka Ozaki
May 25	Hōnetsu e no Akashi	Yutaka Ozaki
June 1	Lindberg V	Lindberg
June 8	Lindberg V	Lindberg
June 15	Lindberg V	Lindberg
June 22	Nōryō	Tube
June 29	Mistral	Takako Okamura
July 6	Octave	Kome Kome Club
July 13	Octave	Kome Kome Club
July 20	Hello Lovers	Misato Watanabe
July 27	Singles 1987–1992	Princess Princess
August 3	Singles 1987–1992	Princess Princess
August 10	Singles 1987–1992	Princess Princess
August 17	Singles 1987–1992	Princess Princess
August 24	Singles 1987–1992	Princess Princess
August 31	Colosseum I	TMN
September 7	Colosseum I	TMN
September 14	Fari Affair	Masayuki Suzuki
September 21	Shyness Overdrive	Kōji Kikkawa
September 28	Erhythm	Eri Hiramatsu
October 5	Yo ni Man'yō no Hana ga Saku Nari	Southern All Stars
October 12	Yo ni Man'yō no Hana ga Saku Nari	Southern All Stars
October 19	Yo ni Man'yō no Hana ga Saku Nari	Southern All Stars
October 26	Yo ni Man'yō no Hana ga Saku Nari	Southern All Stars
November 2	Quiet Life	Mariya Takeuchi
November 9	Run	B'z
November 16	Guys	Chage and Aska
November 23	The Swinging Star	Dreams Come True
November 30	The Swinging Star	Dreams Come True
December 7	Tears and Reasons	Yumi Matsutoya
December 14	Tears and Reasons	Yumi Matsutoya
December 21	Friends	B'z
December 28	The Checkers	The Checkers
