= List of Oricon number-one albums of 2006 =

The highest-selling albums and mini-albums in Japan are ranked in the Oricon Weekly Chart, which is published by Oricon Style magazine. The data are compiled by Oricon based on each album's weekly physical sales. In 2006, 42 albums reached the peak of the charts.

== Chart history ==
Issue Date	Song	Artist(s)	Reference(s)
January 2	Nameless World	Kobukuro	
January 16	(Miss)understood	Ayumi Hamasaki	
January 23	Koichi Domoto Endless Shock Original Sound Track	Kōichi Dōmoto	
January 30	Ribbon	Yuzu	
February 6	Adult	Tokyo Jihen	
February 13	Ai Jibunhaku	Kreva	
February 20	Sora Ippai ni Kanaderu Inori	Aqua Timez	
February 27	Outgrow	BoA	
March 6	The Love Rocks	Dreams Come True	
March 13	Coward	Endlicheri☆Endlicheri	
March 20	Best: Second Session	Kumi Koda	
March 27	Best: Second Session	Kumi Koda	
April 3	Best of KAT-TUN	KAT-TUN	
April 10	Asia	Exile	
April 17	Cycle Hit 1991-1997 Spitz Complete Single Collection	Spitz	
April 24	Confidence	HY	
May 1	Confidence	HY	
May 8	Catch the Wave	Def Tech	
May 15	Catch the Wave	Def Tech	
May 22	Stadium Arcadium	Red Hot Chili Peppers	
May 29	Horizon	Remioromen	
June 5	Horizon	Remioromen	
June 12	Horizon	Remioromen	
June 19	1000000000000	T.M. Revolution	
June 26	Ultra Blue	Hikaru Utada	
July 3	Ultra Blue	Hikaru Utada	
July 10	Monster	B'z	
July 17	Arashic	Arashi	
July 24	Speciality	Nami Tamaki	
July 31	Garyūsenpū	Megaryu	
August 7	Pop Up! SMAP	SMAP	
August 14	Very Best II	V6	
August 21	Crispy Park	Every Little Thing	
August 28	Beautiful Songs: Kokoro de Kiku Uta	Various Artists	
September 4	Kanojo	Aiko	
September 11	Shōnan no Kaze: Riders High	Shōnan no Kaze	
September 18	Wave	Yuki	
September 25	Mirror	Kōichi Dōmoto	
October 2	Live Goes On	Seamo	
October 9	All Singles Best	Kobukuro	
October 16	All Singles Best	Kobukuro	
October 23	All Singles Best	Kobukuro	
October 30	All Singles Best	Kobukuro	
November 6	Golden Best: 15th Anniversary	Zard	
November 13	First Message	Ayaka	
November 20	Eleven Fire Crackers	Ellegarden	
November 27	Stop the Clocks	Oasis	
December 4	All the Best	Chemistry	
December 11	Secret	Ayumi Hamasaki	
December 18	5 Nen Mono	Masaharu Fukuyama	
December 25	I Album: ID	KinKi Kids	
