= Please (Shizuka Kudo song) =

Single by Shizuka Kudo
- Released: May 15, 1991
- Genre: Pop
- Length: 4:17
- Label: Pony Canyon
- Composer: Tsugutoshi Gotō
- Lyricist: Yoshiko Miura
- Producer: Tsugutoshi Gotō

Shizuka Kudo singles chronology
| "Boya Boya Dekinai" (1991) | "Please" (1991) | "Metamorphose" (1991) |

Audio sample
- "Please": file; help

"Please" is a song recorded by Japanese singer Shizuka Kudo. It was originally intended to be included on Kudo's sixth studio album, Mind Universe, but was dropped at the last minute. The song was released as a single by Pony Canyon shortly thereafter on May 15, 1991. It made its first album appearance on the compilation album Intimate.

== Background ==
"Please" was written by Yoshiko Miura and Tsugutoshi Gotō, who also produced the track, marking the first collaboration between Miura and Kudo on a single since "Arashi no Sugao". Lyrically, it involves a protagonist pleading with her lover not to end their relationship yet. Gotō was praised for contributing the "freaky" opening bass solo and for arranging the song and Kudo's vocals, which features sections of scat singing, with unison.

== Chart performance ==
"Please" debuted at number-one on the Oricon Singles Chart with 82,000 copies sold in its first week, becoming Kudo's first single to top the chart since "Watashi ni Tsuite". It charted in the top 100 for a total of 14 weeks and was ranked number 83 on the year-end Oricon Singles Chart, selling a reported total of 191,000 copies.

== Track listing ==
All music is composed by Tsugutoshi Gotō.

| No. | Title | Lyrics | Arranger(s) | Length |
|---|---|---|---|---|
| 1. | "Please" | Yoshiko Miura | Gotō | 4:17 |
| 2. | "Manatsu no Shinkirō" (真夏の蜃気楼, "A Midsummer Mirage") | Aeri | Gotō | 4:48 |
| Total length: | | | | 9:05 |

== Charts ==
| Chart (1991) | Peak position |
|---|---|
| Japan Weekly Singles (Oricon) | 1 |
| Japan Monthly Singles (Oricon) | 12 |
| Japan Yearly Singles (Oricon) | 83 |

== Certification ==
| Region | Certification | Certified units/sales |
|---|---|---|
| Japan (RIAJ) | Gold | 200,000^{^} |
^{^} Shipments figures based on certification alone.
