= One Times One =

One Times One, 1x1 or 1×1 may refer to:

- 1×1, an equation that equals 1
- 1 × 1, 1944 poetry book by E. E.
- "1x1", song from British rock band Bring Me the Horizon featuring Nova Twins
- One Times One, a 2007 album by Tangerine Dream
- One X One, a 2004 album by Japanese R&B duo Chemistry
- 1×1=1 (To Be One), an album by South Korean boy group Wanna One

== See also ==
- One by One (disambiguation)
- Web beacon or 1×1 GIF, a technique for web and email tracking
