= List of Oricon number-one albums of 1997 =

These are the Oricon number one albums of 1997, per the Oricon Albums Chart.

== Chart history ==
Key
†	Indicates best-selling album of 1997

Issue Date	Album	Artist(s)
January 13	Maximum	MAX
January 20	Maximum	MAX
January 27	True	L'Arc-en-Ciel
February 3	Sicks	The Yellow Monkey
February 10	Magma	Koshi Inaba
February 17	Welcome-Muzik	Kohmi Hirose
February 24	Magma	Koshi Inaba
March 3	Dreams & Memories	Favorite Blue
March 10	Cowgirl Dreamin'	Yumi Matsutoya
March 17	Bolero	Mr. Children
March 24	Faces Places	Globe
March 31	Faces Places	Globe
April 7	The Power Source	Judy and Mary
April 14	The Power Source	Judy and Mary
April 21	Everlasting	Every Little Thing
April 28	Everlasting	Every Little Thing
May 5	Zard Blend: Sun & Stone	Zard
May 12	Zard Blend: Sun & Stone	Zard
May 19	Smiling: The Best of Noriyuki Makihara	Noriyuki Makihara
May 26	Smiling: The Best of Noriyuki Makihara	Noriyuki Makihara
June 2	Starting Over	Speed
June 9	Starting Over	Speed
June 16	Starting Over	Speed
June 23	Evangelion: Death	TV soundtrack
June 30	Cranberry Soda	Ryuichi Kawamura
July 7	Kawamoto Makoto	Makoto Kawamoto
July 14	Paradox	Nanase Aikawa
July 21	Paradox	Nanase Aikawa
July 28	A Album	Kinki Kids
August 4	Concentration 20	Namie Amuro
August 11	Concentration 20	Namie Amuro
August 18	Power of Dreams	Maki Ohguro
August 25	Power of Dreams	Maki Ohguro
September 1	Power of Dreams	Maki Ohguro
September 8	Power of Dreams	Maki Ohguro
September 15	Fuzakenja nē	Tsuyoshi Nagabuchi
September 22	Butterfly	Mariah Carey
September 29	Junior Sweet	Chara
October 6	Junior Sweet	Chara
October 13	Review †	Glay
October 20	Review †	Glay
October 27	Review †	Glay
November 3	Review †	Glay
November 10	Review †	Glay
November 17	Wands Historical Best Album	Wands
November 24	Sing or Die	Dreams Come True
December 1	Survive	B'z
December 8	Love	Ryuichi Kawamura
December 15	Love	Ryuichi Kawamura
December 22	I·De·A	Kyosuke Himuro
December 29	Singles	Luna Sea
