= Wheelis =

Wheelis is a surname. Notable people with the surname include:

- Allen Wheelis (1915–2007), American psychoanalyst and writer
- Mark Wheelis, American microbiologist
