= 30th Japan Record Awards =

1988 Japanese music awards ceremony

- Date: 31 December 1988
- Venue: Nippon Budokan, Tokyo
- Hosted by: Hiroshi Sekiguchi

Television/radio coverage
- Network: TBS

The 30th Japan Record Awards were held on 31 December 1988, and were broadcast live on TBS.

The audience rating was 21.7%.

== Award winners ==
- Japan Record Award:
  - Hikaru Genji for "Paradise Ginga"
- Best Vocalist:
  - Chiyoko Shimakura
- Best New Artist:
  - Otokogumi
- Best Album:
  - Kyosuke Himuro for "Flowers for Algernon"

== See also ==
- 1988 in Japanese music
