= List of Oricon number-one albums of 1998 =

These are the Oricon number one albums of 1998, per the Oricon Albums Chart.

== Chart history ==
Key
†	Indicates best-selling album of 1998

Issue Date	Album	Artist(s)
January 12	Storytelling	Tomomi Kahala
January 19	Works: The Best of TRF	TRF
January 26	Works: The Best of TRF	TRF
February 2	Triple Joker	T.M. Revolution
February 9	181920	Namie Amuro
February 16	181920	Namie Amuro
February 23	Super Heroes	V6
March 2	Missing Place	Favorite Blue
March 9	Heart	L'Arc-en-Ciel
March 16	Punch Drunkard	The Yellow Monkey
March 23	The Boøwy	Boøwy
March 30	Deen Singles +1	Deen
April 6	Fake Fur	Spitz
April 13	Love again	Globe
April 20	Jet-CD	Puffy
April 27	Time to Destination	Every Little Thing
May 4	Time to Destination	Every Little Thing
May 11	Rise	Speed
May 18	Rise	Speed
May 25	Kumuiuta	Cocco
June 1	B'z The Best "Pleasure" †	B'z
June 8	B'z The Best "Pleasure" †	B'z
June 15	B'z The Best "Pleasure" †	B'z
June 22	B'z The Best "Pleasure" †	B'z
June 29	Smap 012 Viva Amigos	SMAP
July 6	Umi no Yeah!!	Southern All Stars
July 13	Umi no Yeah!!	Southern All Stars
July 20	Crimson	Nanase Aikawa
July 27	Mother Father Brother Sister	Misia
August 3	Shine	Luna Sea
August 10	Pure Soul	Glay
August 17	Pure Soul	Glay
August 24	B Album	KinKi Kids
August 31	Mahō no Te	Tōko Furuuchi
September 7	Cozy	Tatsuro Yamashita
September 14	New Adventure	My Little Lover
September 21	Mother Earth	Maki Ohguro
September 28	B'z The Best "Treasure"	B'z
October 5	B'z The Best "Treasure"	B'z
October 12	B'z The Best "Treasure"	B'z
October 19	Nagai Aida: Kiroro no Mori	Kiroro
October 26	Samurai	Tsuyoshi Nagabuchi
November 2	Sakura	Southern All Stars
November 9	Sakura	Southern All Stars
November 16	Neue Muzik	Yumi Matsutoya
November 23	Neue Muzik	Yumi Matsutoya
November 30	The #1's	Mariah Carey
December 7	The #1's	Mariah Carey
December 14	Maximum Groove	MAX
December 21	Relation	Globe
December 28	Moment	Speed

== Annual ==
- Number one album of 1998: B'z The Best "Pleasure" by B'z.
- Most weeks at number-one: B'z with a total of 7 weeks.

== See also ==
- 1998 in music
