= The Way We Are (Chemistry album) =

Studio album by Chemistry
- Released: November 7, 2001
- Genre: R&B
- Length: 61:27
- Label: Sony Music Japan

Chemistry chronology
The Way We Are (2001)	Second to None (2003)

The Way We Are is an album by the Japanese R&B duo Chemistry, released on November 7, 2001 by Sony Music Japan.

== Track listing ==
1. "Intro-lude ~The Way We Are~"
2. "合鍵"
3. "PIECES OF A DREAM"
4. "愛しすぎて"
5. "BROTHERHOOD"
6. "Point of No Return"
7. "C'EST LA VIE"
8. "You Go Your Way (Album Version)"
9. "Rewind"
10. "君をさがしてた ~The Wedding Song~"
11. "星たちの距離"
12. "Motherland"
