= Metamorphose (Shizuka Kudo song) =

Single by Shizuka Kudo
- Released: October 23, 1991
- Genre: Pop
- Length: 4:15
- Label: Pony Canyon
- Songwriters: Gorō Matsui; Tsugutoshi Gotō
- Producer: Tsugutoshi Gotō

Shizuka Kudo singles chronology
"Please" (1991)	"Metamorphose" (1991)	"Mechakucha ni Naite Shimaitai" (1992)

Audio sample
- "Metamorphose": file; help

"Metamorphose" (メタモルフォーゼ; lit. "Metamorphosis") is a song recorded by Japanese singer Shizuka Kudo. It is the theme song for the CX television series Nandara Mandara, which starred Kudo herself. It was released as a single through Pony Canyon on October 23, 1991. "Metamorphose" made its first album appearance on the compilation album, Intimate. Kudo performed the song on her fourth appearance on Kōhaku Uta Gassen. In 2015, DAM asked their users to select their favorite Shizuka Kudo songs to sing karaoke to and compiled a top ten list; "Metamorphose" was one of the top vote-getters, rounding up the list at number ten.

== Background ==
The song was written by Gorō Matsui, composed by Tsugutoshi Gotō and arranged by Gotō and Satoshi Kadokura. The title is the german word for "metamorphosis". Lyrically, it describes a restless protagonist going through the thrills of falling in love. The "funky" track, musically 160 BPM, is noted for being unusually uptempo for Kudo's repertoire. Gotō was praised for creating a "groovy" sound with the use of organic instruments.

== Chart performance ==
"Metamorphose" debuted at number two on the Oricon Singles Chart, moving 121,000 units in its first week. It spent a total of 16 weeks in the top 100. With 260,000 copies sold in 1991, it ranked at number 59 on the year-end Oricon Singles Chart.

== Track listing ==
All music is composed by Tsugutoshi Gotō.

No.	Title	Lyrics	Arranger(s)	Length
1.	"Metamorphose" (メタモルフォーゼ, Metamorufōze, "Metamorphosis")	Gorō Matsui	Gotō; Satoshi Kadokura	4:15
2.	"Riaru" (Ri・a・ru, "Real")	Aeri	Gotō	4:49
3.	"Metamorphose" (Original Karaoke)		Gotō; Kadokura	4:15
Total length:				13:19

== Charts ==
Chart (1991)	Peak position
Japan Weekly Singles (Oricon)	2
Japan Monthly Singles (Oricon)	5
Japan Yearly Singles (Oricon)	59

== Certification ==
Region	Certification	Certified units/sales
Japan (RIAJ)	Platinum	440,000
