= Neo Fascio =

Studio album by Kyosuke Himuro
- Released: September 27, 1989
- Genres: Rock, pop
- Length: 46:10
- Label: Toshiba-EMI
- Producer: Masahide Sakuma

Kyosuke Himuro chronology
Flowers for Algernon (1988)	Neo Fascio (1989)	Higher Self (1991)

Neo Fascio is the second album by Japanese singer Kyosuke Himuro. The album explores the theme of fascism through music, emphasizing the dangers associated with it.

== Musicality and Themes ==
The concept work for the album was inspired by the song "Hitori Fascism" with lyrics by Shigeru Izumiya from his previous album Flowers for Algernon. Around the same time, after watching the film "Pink Floyd: The Wall," Himuro was deeply moved and formed a strong belief in the close connection between rock music and fascism. A particular scene that caught his attention was the imitation of Hitler's speech at the Nazi party convention, to which Himuro became truly appalled by the acts committed by the Nazi Party. Himuro wanted to express the brazen diffusion effects Hitler's speeches had on the masses throughout his music and concerts.

Himuro was also influenced by the worldview of George Orwell's novel "1984" as well as David Bowie's interpretation of 1984 through his album Diamond Dogs

Due to the difficult theme in fascism and the taboo nature of it dealing with someone like Adolf Hitler, it is a concept album. "Maybe it won't sell. However, I want to focus on something more important than the result of that." said Himuro. Director Jiro Koyasu, who heard about the theme, said that normally it would be difficult to sell this kind of work, but at the time Himuro did not see it as a major problem because he had built up a relationship of trust with fans.

== Track listing ==
1. Overture
2. Neo Fascio
3. Escape
4. Charisma
5. Cool
6. Summer Game
7. Rhapsody in Red
8. Misty
9. Camouflage
10. Calling
11. Love Song

== Singles ==
- Summer Game — #1
- Misty — #2

== See also ==
- 1989 in Japanese music
