= Eric Fukusaki =

Peruvian singer based in Japan (born 1991)

- エリック福崎
- Born: April 27, 1991 (age 35); Lima, Peru
- Occupations: Singer-songwriter; composer
- Years active: 2012–present
- Musical career
- Genres: J-pop; Latin pop
- Instrument: Guitar
- Label: Up-Front Works
- Website: ericfukusakiofficial.wixsite.com/newme

Eric Fukusaki (エリック・フクサキ; born April 27, 1991) is a Peruvian singer based in Japan. Born and raised in Lima, he began singing in competitions during his adolescence and placing first in several. After successfully auditioning for the Up-Front Works record label, he debuted alongside Munehiko Ohno in Alma Kaminiito in 2012. The duo released three singles and one album before its dissolution the following year. In 2014, he embarked on a solo career; his discography consists of three singles and one cover mini-album.

== Life and career ==
Eric Fukusaki was born on April 27, 1991, in Lima, Peru. His mother is Chinese Peruvian and his father is Japanese Peruvian. Part of the third generation of Japanese diaspora, Fukusaki is the middle child between brothers Dennis and Kenneth. He was raised listening to enka from his parents. Starting at the age of 12, he participated in singing competitions, winning several of them. In 2008, he traveled to Brazil and won a competition meant to "represent the colony". He later traveled to Japan with his parents for a month to participate in another contest. With his siblings, along Hisae and Mabi, they formed the band Akinee. However, he decided to emigrate to Japan in 2009 at the age of 18 to pursue a music career in enka. He lived in Japan for a year in order to "take in the ambience [of the music in the country]". Upon his return to Peru, musician Kazufumi Miyazawa called him to suggest taking part in Nipponia, a concert which takes place in Okinawa targeting Japanese diaspora.

Together with Munehiko Ohno, Fukusaki was selected by Up-Front Works in February 2011 to establish a group to sing in Japanese, Spanish, and English. Seeking to "unite Japan with the world", Alma Kaminiito released its debut single in April 2012. It ranked in the top 10 of the Billboard Japan Hot 100. In August, the pair embarked on its first Alma Kaminiito 1st Live "Uno" concert. In December of that year, Alma Kaminnito released its first album Alma Covers, which contains Spanish and English-language covers of Japanese songs from the 1980s and 1990s. In 2013, Ohno announced his departure from the group, resulting in its dissolution.

By the end of the year, Fukusaki announced his plan to debut as a soloist. On April 9, 2014, Fukusaki released his debut single "Shinjiru Mono ni Sukuwareru"/"Subete no Kanashimi ni Sayonarasuru tame ni"/"Tsuioku". "Ai Yai Yai!"/"Ikanaide Señorita" was released as his second single on August 19, 2015. In 2017, he composed the single "Peanut Butter Jelly Love" for idol girl group Country Girls, his first contribution for another music act. He also wrote "Fiesta! Fiesta!" for idol girl group Juice=Juice, where he also provided the Spanish lines on the track. Following two years of absence, Fukusaki released his first cover mini-album Aru Koi no Monogatari on August 23. This was followed by the release of his third single "Kazaranai Uta" on October 4.

== Discography ==
=== Albums ===
==== Cover EPs ====
Title	Album details
Aru Koi no Monogatari (ある恋の物語,, A Love Story)	Released: August 23, 2017; Label: Up-Front Indies; Format: CD, digital download

=== Singles ===
==== As lead artist ====
Title	Year	Peak chart positions	Sales	Release
Title	Year	Oricon	Sales	Release
"Shinjiru Mono ni Sukuwareru"/"Subete no Kanashimi ni Sayonarasuru tame ni"/"Tsuioku" (信じるものに救われる/すべての悲しみにさよならするために/追憶; "Our Belief Will Save Us"/"Farewell to All the Pains Behind"/"Memories")	2014	180	JPN: 182	Non-album single
"Ai Yai Yai!"/"Ikanaide Señorita" (Ai Yai Yai!/行かないでセニョリータ; "Ai Yai Yai!"/"Don't Leave Señorita")	2015	—		Non-album single
"Kazaranai Uta" (飾らない歌; "The Natural Song")	2017	—		Non-album single
