= Intimate (Shizuka Kudo album) =

Compilation album by Shizuka Kudo
- Released: December 11, 1991
- Recorded: 1988–91
- Genre: Pop
- Length: 45:06
- Label: Pony Canyon

Shizuka Kudo chronology
Mind Universe (1991)	Intimate (1991)	Trinity (1992)

Intimate (stylized as intimate) is the fourth compilation album by Japanese singer Shizuka Kudo. It was released on December 11, 1991, through Pony Canyon. The album features all singles released from "Koi Hitoyo" (1988) through "Metamorphose" (1991). The opening track, "Dare mo Shiranai Blue Angel" is a re-worked solo recording of an Ushirogami Hikaretai song by the same name released as a B-side to the single "Hora ne, Haru ga Kita" in 1988. The closing track is a new song entitled "Rashikunai", written specifically for the album by Kudo herself, under the pseudonym Aeri.

== Commercial performance ==
Intimate debuted at number four on the Oricon Albums Chart, with 131,000 units sold. It dropped five positions to number nine on its second week, with 48,000 copies sold. With sales of 51,000, Intimate fell to number eleven the following week, where it stayed for two consecutive weeks, selling 25,000 copies on its fourth charting week. The album stayed in the top twenty for two more weeks, charting at number 17 then number 19 and selling 16,000 and 15,000 copies, respectively. Intimate spent eleven weeks in the top 100, selling a reported total of 321,000 copies during its chart run, and ranked at number 52 on the year-end Oricon Albums Chart for 1992.

== Track listing ==
All music is composed by Tsugutoshi Gotō except "Rashikunai" by Aeri.

No.	Title	Lyrics	Arranger(s)	Length
1.	"Dare mo Shiranai Blue Angel" (誰も知らないブルーエンジェル, "Blue Angel Nobody Knows")	Yasushi Akimoto	Tsugutoshi Gotō	3:58
2.	"Metamorphose"	Gorō Matsui	Gotō	4:15
3.	"Please"	Yoshiko Miura	Gotō	4:17
4.	"Boya Boya Dekinai"	Matsui	Gotō	3:40
5.	"Watashi ni Tsuite"	Miyuki Nakajima	Draw4	4:07
6.	"Senryū no Shizuku"	Aeri	Draw4	4:42
7.	"Kuchibiru Kara Biyaku"	Matsui	Draw4	3:56
8.	"Kōsa ni Fukarete"	Nakajima	Gotō	3:49
9.	"Arashi no Sugao"	Miura	Gotō	3:31
10.	"Koi Hitoyo"	Matsui	Gotō	4:31
11.	"Rashikunai" (らしくない, "It's Unlike You")	Aeri	Gotō	4:20
Total length:				45:06

== Charts ==
Chart (1991–92)	Peak position
Japan Weekly Albums (Oricon)	4
Japan Yearly Albums (Oricon)	52

== Certification ==
Region	Certification	Certified units/sales
Japan (RIAJ)	Platinum	400,000^{^}
^{^} Shipments figures based on certification alone.

== Release history ==
Region	Date	Format(s)	Label	Ref.
Japan	December 11, 1991	CD; cassette	Pony Canyon	
Various	February 4, 2015	Digital download	Pony Canyon	
