= List of Oricon number-one singles of 2026 =

The following is a list of Oricon number-one singles of 2026.

== Chart history ==
List of Oricon number-one singles of 2026
Issue date	Song	Artist(s)	Sales	Ref.
January 5	"Suki Nanka ja... Nyai!"	Fav Me	35,813	
January 12	"&Joy"	Kis-My-Ft2	91,082	
January 19	"Tokyo Junction"	Show-Wa	91,297	
January 26	"Blue Noise"	Ryosuke Yamada	98,180	
February 2	"Star Wish"	Starglow	42,294	
February 9	"Cliffhanger"	Hinatazaka46	472,781	
February 16	"Spaghetti"	Le Sserafim	11,381	
February 23	"Hanikami"	Hey! Say! JUMP	224,669	
March 2	"Hard Work"	Naniwa Danshi	718,936	
March 9	"Nagorizakura"	AKB48	446,877	
March 16	"Sukisugite Naku"	STU48	121,385	
March 23	"The Growing Up Train"	Sakurazaka46	517,960	
March 30	"Ichibyo" / "Rebellion"	SixTones	392,190	
April 6	"Waltz for Lily"	King & Prince	312,622	
April 13	"Gekiyaku Chūdoku"	=Love	360,118	
April 20	"Saigo ni Kaidan o Kakeagatta no wa Itsu da?"	Nogizaka46	518,236	
April 27	"Kagenimo-Hinatanimo"	Travis Japan	272,142	
May 4	Pulse ("All 4 U" / "Ours" / "Dum" / "Eat Up")	INI	639,552	
May 11	"Bang!!" / "Save Your Heart" / "Odorōze!"	Snow Man	906,622	
May 18	"Matane"	Domoto	154,137	
May 25	"Gachi Muchū!"	Bullet Train	420,127	
June 1	"Kind of Love"	Hinatazaka46	448,606	
June 8	"Cute na Kyutai" / "Nice da ne"	Cutie Street	441,304	
June 15	"Keshiki"	Ji Blue (JO1 and INI)	264,489	
June 22	"Lonesome Rabbit" / "What's 'Kazoku'?"	Sakurazaka46	522,666	
June 29	"Dekoboko Life"	Ae! Group	484,924	
July 6	"Ai Kudasai Mase" / "Koko de First Kiss"	≠Me	310,023	
July 13	"Missing"	Be First	94,108	
July 20	"Idol of Pop" / "Lovereet Fighter"	Panda Dragon	106,544	
July 27	"Power of Love" / "Sensation"	Fruits Zipper	535,924	
August 3	"Zehi ni Oyobazu"	Nogizaka46	509,783	
August 10	"Kienai Hanabi"	Timelesz	425,212	
August 17	"Summer Twintail"	≒Joy	308,148	
August 24	"Yes! Tokyo"	Ebidan	1,053,495	
August 31	"Sukish"	AKB48	559,066	
September 7	"Koi, Hajimemashita"	=Love	514,624	
September 14	"Yes! Tokyo"	Ebidan	70,546	
September 21	"Dance Forever" / "My Only"	SixTones	436,087	
September 28	Anthem ("You Know What to Do" / "1na Ride")	INI	584,179	
October 5	"Rebon" / "Bugs Life" / "Digital Girl"	Number_i	300,026	
October 12	"Ichaicha Mushi"	Hinatazaka46	441,860	
October 19	"Ko1keyz"	Ko1keyz	460,018	
October 26	"Ai Must Be"	Sakurazaka46	565,375	
November 2	"Moonlit"	Naniwa Danshi	403,049	
November 9	"Kaze no Kataomoi"	NGT48	68,528	
November 16	"Emotion"	Ae! Group	479,145	
November 23	"Love Reason"	Genin wa Jibun ni Aru	653,461	

== See also ==
- List of Oricon number-one albums of 2026
