= Between the Lines (Chemistry album) =

Studio album by Chemistry
- Released: June 18, 2003
- Genre: R&B
- Length: 65:17
- Label: Sony Music Japan

Chemistry chronology
Second to None (2003)	Between the Lines (2003)	One X One (2004)

Between the Lines is an album by the Japanese R&B duo Chemistry, released on June 18, 2003 by Sony Music Japan.

== Track listing ==
1. "Naturally Ours"
2. "It Takes Two (OCTOPUSSY Remix feat.LISA)"
3. "Point of No Return (ケツメイシのremix)"
4. "恋するカレン"
5. "BACK TOGETHER AGAIN (West Indies Dream MIX)"
6. "Running Away (Spanish Passion)"
7. "B.M.N. (BIG MAN NOW)"
8. "PIECES OF A DREAM (DJ WATARAI Remix)"
9. "You Go Your Way (LOONY TUNE Remix)"
10. "MOVE ON (Album Version)"
11. "君をさがしてた～シーモネーター&DJ TAKI-SHIT Remix feat.CRYSTAL BOY (nobody knows)"
12. "明治チェルシーの唄"
13. "最後の夜"
