= List of Oricon number-one albums of 1994 =

These are the Oricon number one albums of 1994, per the Oricon Albums Chart.

== Chart history ==
Key
†	Indicates best-selling album of 1994

Issue Date	Album	Artist(s)
January 10	Magic †	Dreams Come True
January 17	Magic †	Dreams Come True
January 24	Magic †	Dreams Come True
January 31	Water Dance	Takashi Utsunomiya
February 7	Super Balance	Katsumi
February 14	Cloudy Heart	Kōji Kikkawa
February 21	World Groove	TRF
February 28	World Groove	TRF
March 7	Hide Your Face	Hide
March 14	The 7th Blues	B'z
March 21	The 7th Blues	B'z
March 28	The 7th Blues	B'z
April 4	Starting Over	Keizo Nakanishi
April 11	Inclination	Mari Hamada
April 18	Angel	Fujii Fumiya
April 25	Angel	Fujii Fumiya
May 2	The Very Rust of Unicorn	Unicorn
May 9	Togetherness	Sing Like Talking
May 16	Hyper Mix III	TRF
May 23	Hyper Mix III	TRF
May 30	Hyper Mix III	TRF
June 6	Delicate Planet	Access
June 13	Oh My Love	Zard
June 20	On and On	Masaharu Fukuyama
June 27	Owaranai Natsu ni	Tube
July 4	Owaranai Natsu ni	Tube
July 11	Kaze no Uta wo Kike	Original Love
July 18	The Name Is...	Eikichi Yazawa
July 25	16th Summer Breeze	Anri
August 1	16th Summer Breeze	Anri
August 8	Impressions	Mariya Takeuchi
August 15	Billionaire	TRF
August 22	Impressions	Mariya Takeuchi
August 29	Impressions	Mariya Takeuchi
September 5	Ying & Yang	Chage and Aska
September 12	Atomic Heart	Mr. Children
September 19	Atomic Heart	Mr. Children
September 26	Deen	Deen
October 3	Kodoku no Taiyō	Keisuke Kuwata
October 10	Shake The Fake	Kyosuke Himuro
October 17	Cross Road	Bon Jovi
October 24	Sunadokei	Keiko Utoku
October 31	Love or Nothing	Miyuki Nakajima
November 7	Pharmacy	Noriyuki Makihara
November 14	Merry Christmas	Mariah Carey
November 21	Eien no Yume ni Mukatte	Maki Ohguro
November 28	Melodies and Memories	Tube
December 5	The Dancing Sun	Yumi Matsutoya
December 12	The Dancing Sun	Yumi Matsutoya
December 19	Merry Christmas	Mariah Carey
December 26	Super Best Box	Chage and Aska
