= Unkle Bob =

Scottish indie rock band

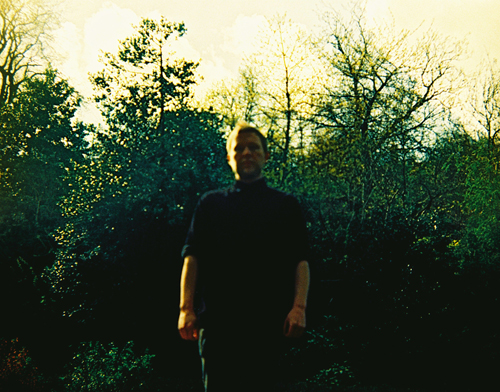

Background information
- Origin: Scotland
- Genres: Indie rock
- Years active: 2003-2011; 2012-present
- Labels: Friendly Sounds; BobCity; JustMe
- Members: Rick Webster
- Past members: Tad MacDonald; Geoff Widdowson; Stuart Cartwright; Ron Yeadon; Chloe Treacher; Chris Hardwick
- Website: Official website

Unkle Bob is a Scottish indie rock band formed in and around Glasgow University. Led by singer/songwriter Rick Webster, Unkle Bob have variously been compared to acts as diverse as R.E.M., Prefab Sprout, and Radiohead.

== History ==
Their debut album Sugar & Spite was released on 16 October 2006 on Friendly Sounds / Mother City – a label set up by James guitarist/violinist Saul Davies and Aaron Moore (Ministry of Sound/EMI). The album gained critical acclaim scoring 4-Star reviews in Q Magazine, Uncut, Mojo, The Times and The Sunday Times. It has an AllMusic rating of 4/5. Several songs from the album ("Swans", "Put a Record On", "One by One") were featured in American television and film such as Grey's Anatomy, CSI Miami, What Happens in Vegas, and Kyle XY.

Unkle Bob toured with The Feeling (Germany, Feb 2007), The Proclaimers (UK/Ireland, Sept 2007), James (North America, Sept/Oct 2008), and Goo Goo Dolls (UK, Nov 2010).

They released their second album, Shockwaves, in 2010. It included three tracks produced by Ken Nelson. Their song "Brighter", written by guitarist Stuart Cartwright, was featured in the 2011 German film Kokowääh.

On 10 November 2011, Unkle Bob announced on their official Facebook page they were splitting after nine years together.

On 5 November 2012, Rick Webster announced on the official web page that he would release a new EP under the name Unkle Bob as a solo artist. Letters EP was released in January 2013, followed by Songs For Others in August 2013. In June 2013, Unkle Bob went to Changsha, Hunan Province in China and became better known in China.

In July 2014, Unkle Bob released their third album, Embers, featuring performances from original band members who reunited briefly for the recording sessions in Wales. The album scored 8/10 in PopMatters music blog.

In October 2015, Unkle Bob released a single entitled "The Long Way Home".

In 2020, Unkle Bob announced the return of the 5 original members back to the fold, after a 9-year hiatus. In November 2020, the band released a new single named "Safety Net". The band plans new recordings and materials in 2021.

== Band members ==
- Rick Webster (vocals, guitar)
- Stuart Cartwright (guitarist)
- Ron Yeadon (drummer)
- Geoff Widdowson (keyboard player)
- Chloe Peacock (bass player)

== Discography ==
=== Albums ===
- Unkle Bob – 2003
- Sugar & Spite – 2006
- Shockwaves – 2010
- Embers – 2014
- The Deepest Sea – 2016

=== EPs ===
- Flux – 2008 (US only)
- Letters EP – 2013
- Songs For Others – 2013

=== Singles ===
- "Too Many People" – June 2006
- "The Hit Parade" – October 2006
- "Put A Record On" – February 2007
- "Swans" - (US download only) – February 2007
- "Satellite" / "Bad Dream" – April 2009
- "In My Head" – September 2010
- "Cold Water" – February 2013
- "Brother" – August 2013
- "It's Not Enough" / "Feel the Rain" – July 2014
- "The Long Way Home" – October 2015
- "Safety Net" – November 2020
