= Memories of Blue =

Studio album by Kyosuke Himuro
- Released: January 7, 1993
- Genre: Rock, pop
- Length: 43:50
- Language: Japanese
- Label: Toshiba-EMI

Kyosuke Himuro chronology
Higher Self (1991)	Memories of Blue (1993)	Shake the Fake (1994)

Memories Of Blue is the fourth studio album by Japanese musician Kyosuke Himuro, released on January 7, 1993. It was reissued on July 21, 2003, in celebration of the singer's 15-year career. In 2020, the album became available on streaming services.

CD Journal magazine noted the consistency of the pop rock sound and praised the song "Will".

== Commercial performance ==
Memories of Blue reached number one on Oricon Albums Chart and remained on chart for twenty weeks, becoming Himuro's best-selling studio album. It was certified triple platinum by RIAJ one month after its release, for selling 1.2 million copies, and the singles "Urban Dance", "Good Luck My Love", and "Kiss Me" were certified gold, gold, and double platinum, respectively.

== Track listing ==
All titles are stylized in all caps.

No.	Title	Length
1.	"Kiss Me"	3:37
2.	"You're the Right"	4:26
3.	"Memories of Blue"	5:11
4.	"Rainy Blue"	4:37
5.	"Good Luck My Love"	4:24
6.	"Son of a Bitch"	3:16
7.	"Decadent"	4:42
8.	"Urban Dance"	3:33
9.	"Get Ready "Tonight" Teddy Boy"	3:22
10.	"Will"	5:37
Total length:		43:50
