= Alma Kaminiito =

Singer pair

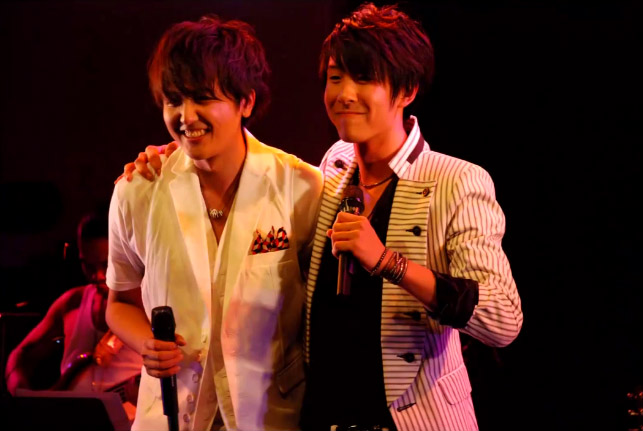
- Alma Kaminiito 1st Live "Uno", August 2012

Background information
- Origin: Japan
- Genres: J-pop, Latin pop
- Years active: 2012–2013
- Label: Up-Front Works
- Past members: Eric Fukusaki; Munehiko Ohno
- Website: almakaminiito.com

Alma Kaminiito (アルマカミニイト) was a J-pop and Latin pop music duo based in Japan. It consisted of Eric Fukusaki of Peru and Munehiko Ohno from Japan. The pair released two singles in 2012: its debut "Akane" and the double A-side "Amatsubu Pearl"/"Dakishimetai Dakishimetai". Alma Kamininito released the cover album Alma Covers at the end of the year, which featured Japanese-language songs sung in Spanish and English. It marked the unit's final release following the departure of Ohno in April 2013.

== History ==
=== 2011: Formation ===
Part of the Japanese diaspora in Peru, Erik Fukusaki traveled to Japan at the age of 18 in order to pursue a career in enka. A Japanese native, Munehiko Ohno was a lifelong practitioner of the buyō style of traditional Japanese dance. Citing music duo Chemistry, he took an interest in music at the age of 18. He began taking singing lessons while attending university. In order to gain entrance into Up-Front Works, Fukusaki and Ohno separately auditioned for the record company's Forrest Award in February 2011. Upon their admittance, Up-Front posed the idea of the pair creating a single unit together. Ohno agreed to the proposal the day of his successful audition; after seeking advisement from Alberto Shiroma of the Peruvian ensemble Diamantes and Kazufumi Miyazawa of the Japanese band The Boom, Fukusaki deliberated for two weeks before accepting.

In choosing the duo's name, Fukusaki and Ohno were told to write numerous words in Spanish and Japanese onto a paper. Staff of the record company then chose and joined two Spanish words together: "alma", meaning "soul", and "caminito", meaning "path". The president of the company decided to change the spelling of the latter to "kami ni ito", meaning "paper" and "thread". Blending J-pop and Latin pop into its music, Alma Kaminiito sought to "unite Japan with the world".

=== 2012–13: Debut and dissolution ===
Prior to its debut, Alma Kaminiito participated in various street performances and appeared as guests at music events. The three songs recorded for Alma Kaminiito's debut single were used for the drama film Share House (2011) preceding its release. A reggae-tinged number, "Akane" was released on April 25, 2012. On that day, the duo promoted the single by performing at the Sunshine City building complex in the district of Ikebukuro. In August, the pair held its first concert entitled Alma Kaminiito 1st Live "Uno". Alma Kaminiito released the double A-side "Amatsubu Pearl"/"Dakishimetai Dakishimetai" on October 24 as its second single.

In December, Alma Kaminiito released its first album Alma Covers, which contains Spanish and English-language covers of Japanese songs from the 1980s and 1990s. The translated Spanish lyrics were written by Fukusaki. The duo embarked on its first tour at the end of 2012 to February of the following year. On April 4, 2013, the departure of Ohno from the group was announced via Alma Kaminiito's official website. In his blog, he disclosed his intentions to take over his family's business.

== Discography ==
=== Albums ===
==== Cover albums ====
Title	Album details
Alma Covers	Released: December 26, 2012; Label: Hachama; Format: CD, digital download

=== Singles ===
Title	Year	Peak chart positions		Sales	Album
Title	Year	Oricon Singles Chart	Billboard Japan Hot 100 (Note: Week references for Billboard Japan Hot 100: "Akane", "Amatsubu Pearl".)	Sales	Album
"Akane" (茜; "Deep Red")	2012	33	10	3,734 (CD)	Non-album single
"Amatsubu Pearl" (雨粒パール; "Raindrop Pearl")	2012	45	22	2,118 (CD)	Non-album single
"Dakishimetai Dakishimetai" (抱きしめたい 抱きしめたい; "I Want to Hold You, I Want to Hold You")	2012	45	—	2,118 (CD)	Non-album single
