= How People Change =

1973 book by Allen Wheelis

- First edition
- Author: Allen Wheelis
- Language: English
- Subject: Psychology
- Genre: Non-fiction
- Publisher: Harper & Row
- Publication date: 1973

How People Change is a book published in 1973 by psychoanalyst Allen Wheelis.
