= Flowers for Algernon (album) =

Studio album by Kyosuke Himuro
- Released: September 1, 1988
- Genre: Rock, pop
- Length: 46:36
- Label: Toshiba-EMI
- Producer: Ken Yoshida, Kyosuke Himuro

Kyosuke Himuro chronology
Flowers for Algernon (1988)	Neo Fascio (1989)

Flowers for Algernon is the first solo album by Japanese singer Kyosuke Himuro. The Japanese rock group Boøwy, to which he once belonged, disbanded and this album was released as his solo debut five months later. The album reached number one on Oricon Albums Chart and stayed on the chart for 25 weeks.

== Background ==
Himuro was influenced by the novel Flowers for Algernon and composed his second single "Dear Algernon".

The lyricist of the album's last song "Hitori Fascism" is folk musician Shigeru Izumiya.

== Track listing ==
1. "Angel"
2. "Roxy"
3. "Love & Game"
4. "Dear Algernon"
5. "Sex & Clash & Rock 'n' Roll"
6. "Alison"
7. "Shadow Boxer"
8. "Taste of Money"
9. "Stranger"
10. "Pussy Cat"
11. Hitori Fashizumu (独りファシズム, Alone Fascism)

== Singles ==
Song chart performance
Title	Peak position (JPN)
"Angel"	1
"Dear Algernon"	2

== See also ==
- 1988 in Japanese music

Preceded by License (Tsuyoshi Nagabuchi)	Japan Record Award for the Best Album; 1988	Succeeded by Circuit of Rainbow (Anri)
