= Every Best Single 2 =

Greatest hits album by Every Little Thing
- Released: September 3, 2003
- Genres: J-pop, synthpop, pop rock
- Length: 72:57
- Label: Avex Trax
- Producer: Max Matsuura (exec.)

Every Little Thing chronology
Many Pieces (2003)	Every Best Single 2 (2003)	Commonplace (2004)

Every Best Single 2 is the second greatest hits compilation of J-pop duo Every Little Thing, released on September 10, 2003 by Avex Trax.

== Background ==
This album is the second best of collection of Every Little Thing, after Every Best Single +3 released in 1999, and includes all the singles from "Pray" to "Fundamental Love", which was a recut single for the album (although it was later also included in Commonplace). Nevertheless, as bonus tracks it includes two pre-2000 singles, "For the Moment" and "Deatta Koro no Yō ni", in newly recorded acoustic versions.

This compilation was the first release of the band to be released with a bonus DVD (only available in the limited edition).

== Reception ==
The album received the award for "Rock & Pop Album of the Year" at the 18th Japan Gold Disc Awards.

== Commercial performance ==
The album peaked at number one on the Oricon charts and charted for 38 weeks.

== Track listing ==
CD
No.	Title	Lyrics	Music	Arranger(s)	Length
1.	"Pray"	Mitsuru Igarashi	Igarashi	Igarashi	5:30
2.	"Sure"	Kaori Mochida	Every Little Thing	Every Little Thing	4:56
3.	"Rescue Me"	Igarashi	Igarashi	Igarashi	4:21
4.	"Ai no Kakera" (愛のカケラ)	Mochida	Kunio Tago	Genya Kuwajima^{[b]}	4:54
5.	"Fragile"	Mochida	Kazuhito Kikuchi	Kuwajima, Kikuchi^{[b]}	4:52
6.	"Graceful World"	Mochida	Y@suo Ohtani	Kuwajima, Ohtani^{[b]}	5:11
7.	"Jump"	Mochida	Mochida	Akira Murata	4:07
8.	"Kiwoku" (キヲク)	Mochida	Kikuchi	Murata^{[a]}	5:26
9.	"Sasayaka na Inori" (ささやかな祈り)	Mochida	Tago	Expo^{[a]}	4:55
10.	"Unspeakable"	Mochida	Kikuchi	Ohtani, Masafumi Nakao^{[b]}	4:24
11.	"Nostalgia"	Mochida	Kikuchi	Tasuku^{[b]}	5:49
12.	"Grip!"	Mochida	Kazuhiro Hara	HΛL	4:51
13.	"Fundamental Love" (ファンダメンタル・ラブ)	Mochida	Tago	Tasuku^{[b]}	4:17
14.	"For the Moment" (Acoustic Version)	Igarashi	Igarashi	Ichiro Ito	4:14
15.	"Deatta Koro no Yō ni" (出逢った頃のように) (Acoustic Version)	Igarashi	Igarashi	Ito	5:10

DVD
No.	Title	Length
1.	"Fundamental Love" (Music Video)
2.	"Recording Scene"
3.	"Live & Documentary Scene Digest"

Notes

- ^{^a} co-arranged by Every Little Thing
- ^{^b} co-arranged by Ichiro Ito

== Charts ==
Release	Chart	Peak position	Sales total
September 3, 2003	Oricon Daily Albums Chart	1	
September 3, 2003	Oricon Weekly Albums Chart	1	713,269 copies sold
