= List of Oricon number-one albums of 2026 =

The following is a list of Oricon number-one albums of 2026.

== Chart history ==
List of Oricon number-one albums of 2026
Issue date	Album	Artist(s)	Weekly sales	Ref.
January 5	Starring	King & Prince	250,124	
January 12	Prema	Fujii Kaze	8,817	
January 19	Love Pulse	Treasure	22,082	
January 26	My Respect	Nogizaka46	192,512	
February 2	Milesixtones: Best Tracks	SixTones	577,124	
February 9	The Fusion	OMI	36,218	
February 16	Play	MiSaMo	80,550	
February 23	Kawaii Lab. Best Album	Team Kawaii Lab	148,685	
March 2	Idol1st	Kento Nakajima	70,104	
March 9	Runway	Ae! Group	320,675	
March 16	Tokimeki Egao	Chō Tokimeki Sendenbu	85,682	
March 23	Yujitsumuni	West.	224,214	
March 30	Arirang	BTS	546,721	
April 6	Ubugoe	Mr. Children	148,771	
April 13	Good Girl But Not for You	NiziU	192,020	
April 20	Cover of Takahisa Masuda	Takahisa Masuda	95,229	
April 27	7th Year: A Moment of Stillness in the Thorns	Tomorrow X Together	229,996	
May 4	We on Fire	&Team	559,553	
May 11	Momentum	Timelesz	327,057	
May 18	No Tragedy	TWS	220,027	
May 25	Jekyll	Hyde	13,229	
June 1	Are You Red.Y?	Ryosuke Yamada	117,746	
June 8	Lucid Dream	Ive	119,680	
June 15	New Wav	Treasure	85,401	
June 22	Home	BoyNextDoor	159,073	
June 29	ND5	Naniwa Danshi	409,711	
July 6	Hitotarashi	Keisuke Kuwata	116,073	
July 13	Fresh!!	ICEx	82,828	
July 20	II	Riize	44,718	
July 27	Augment	Kenmochi Toya	72,474	
August 3	On-Deck!	Mechatu-a	241,066	
August 10	KMK	NEWS	112,945	
August 17	Damdarah	Super Eight	130,599	
August 24	This & That	Stray Kids	103,561	
August 31	KaikiLove	Zerobaseone	90,640	
September 7	The Sin: Bliss	Enhypen	189,859	
September 14	So Honey EP	King & Prince	191,857	
September 21	Supernova	Masaharu Fukuyama	113,131	
September 28	Love Engine	M!lk	915,966	
October 5	Mark on Me	&Team	511,457	
October 12	Pops	Mrs. Green Apple	645,661	
October 19	Amenity	Snow Man	1,013,677	
October 26	Joy 2	Tatsuro Yamashita	107,392	
November 2	Dreamscape	JxJ	65,558	
November 9	Kis Scene	Kis-My-Ft2	321,545	
November 16	Be:4U	Be First	92,730	
November 23	Juliet	Hey! Say! JUMP	209,704	

== See also ==
- List of Oricon number-one singles of 2026
