= Mind Universe =

Studio album by Shizuka Kudo
- Released: March 6, 1991
- Genre: Pop soul
- Length: 39:34
- Label: Pony Canyon
- Producer: Yūzō Watanabe

Shizuka Kudo chronology
Unlimited (1990)	Mind Universe (1991)	Intimate (1991)

Singles from Mind Universe
- 1. "Boya Boya Dekinai" Released: January 23, 1991

Mind Universe (stylized as mind Universe) is the sixth studio album by Japanese singer Shizuka Kudo. It was released on March 6, 1991, through Pony Canyon. It features the single "Boya Boya Dekinai". The album was re-released in APO-CD format on December 1, 1993. Mind Universe became Kudo's fourth number-one album and her last record to top the Oricon Albums Chart.

== Commercial performance ==
Mind Universe debuted at number one on the Oricon Albums Chart, with 112,000 units sold in its first week. The album fell to number three the following week, with 39,000 copies sold. Mind Universe dropped to number twelve next, where it stayed for two straight weeks, selling 23,000 and 19,000 copies, respectively. It stayed in the top twenty for one last week, coming in at number 15 with sales of 16,000 copies, before dropping down to number 27 on its sixth charting week. The album charted in the top 100 for eleven consecutive weeks, selling a reported total of 247,000 copies during its run. It was ranked number 69 on the year-end Oricon Albums Chart.

== Track listing ==
All tracks composed and arranged by Tsugutoshi Gotō.

No.	Title	Lyrics	Length
1.	"Ude no Naka no Universe" (腕の中のUniverse, "The Universe Between Your Arms")	Yoshihiko Andō	4:10
2.	"Hashi" (橋, "Bridge")	Yoshiko Miura	3:39
3.	"Mumei no Kyūjitsu" (無名の休日, "Nameless Holiday")	Sayako Morimoto	5:06
4.	"Superstition"	Miura	5:03
5.	"Furueru Ichibyō" (震える1秒, "One Second Shiver")	Miura	3:43
6.	"Boya Boya Dekinai"	Gorō Matsui	3:40
7.	"Tsugihagi no Portrait" (つぎはぎのポートレイト, Tsugihagi no Pōtoreito, "Patched Up Portrait")	Miyuki Nakajima	4:37
8.	"Embrace"	Nakajima	4:31
9.	"'Shū Ten'" (「愁・」, "'Lament.'")	Aeri	5:05
Total length:			39:34

== Charts ==
Chart (1991)	Peak position
Japan Weekly Albums (Oricon)	1
Japan Yearly Albums (Oricon)	69

== Certification ==
Region	Certification	Certified units/sales
Japan (RIAJ)	Gold	247,000

== Release history ==
Region	Date	Format(s)	Label	Ref.
Japan	March 6, 1991	CD; cassette	Pony Canyon	
Japan	December 1, 1993	APO-CD	Pony Canyon	
Various	February 4, 2015	Digital download	Pony Canyon	

== See also ==
- List of Oricon number-one albums
