= Higher Self (Kyosuke Himuro album) =

Studio album by Kyosuke Himuro
- Released: April 6, 1991
- Genre: Rock, pop
- Length: 48:11
- Label: Toshiba-EMI
- Producer: Akira Nishihira

Kyosuke Himuro chronology
Neo Fascio (1988)	Higher Self (1991)	Memories of Blue (1991)

Higher Self is the third album by Japanese singer Kyosuke Himuro. Reached number one on Oricon Albums Chart.

== Track listing ==
1. Crime of Love
2. Black-List
3. Velvet Rose
4. Psychic Baby
5. Maximum 100 no Yūutsu (MAXIMUM 100の憂鬱 (Melancholy of Maximum 100))
6. Wild at Night
7. Stormy Night
8. Climax
9. Cabaret in the Heaven
10. Moon
11. Jealousy wo Nemurasete (Remix Version) (JEALOUSYを眠らせて(REMIX VERSION) (Let Jealousy Sleep (Remix Version)))
12. Lover's Day -Solitude-
