= Brief & Trunks =

Japanese musical duo

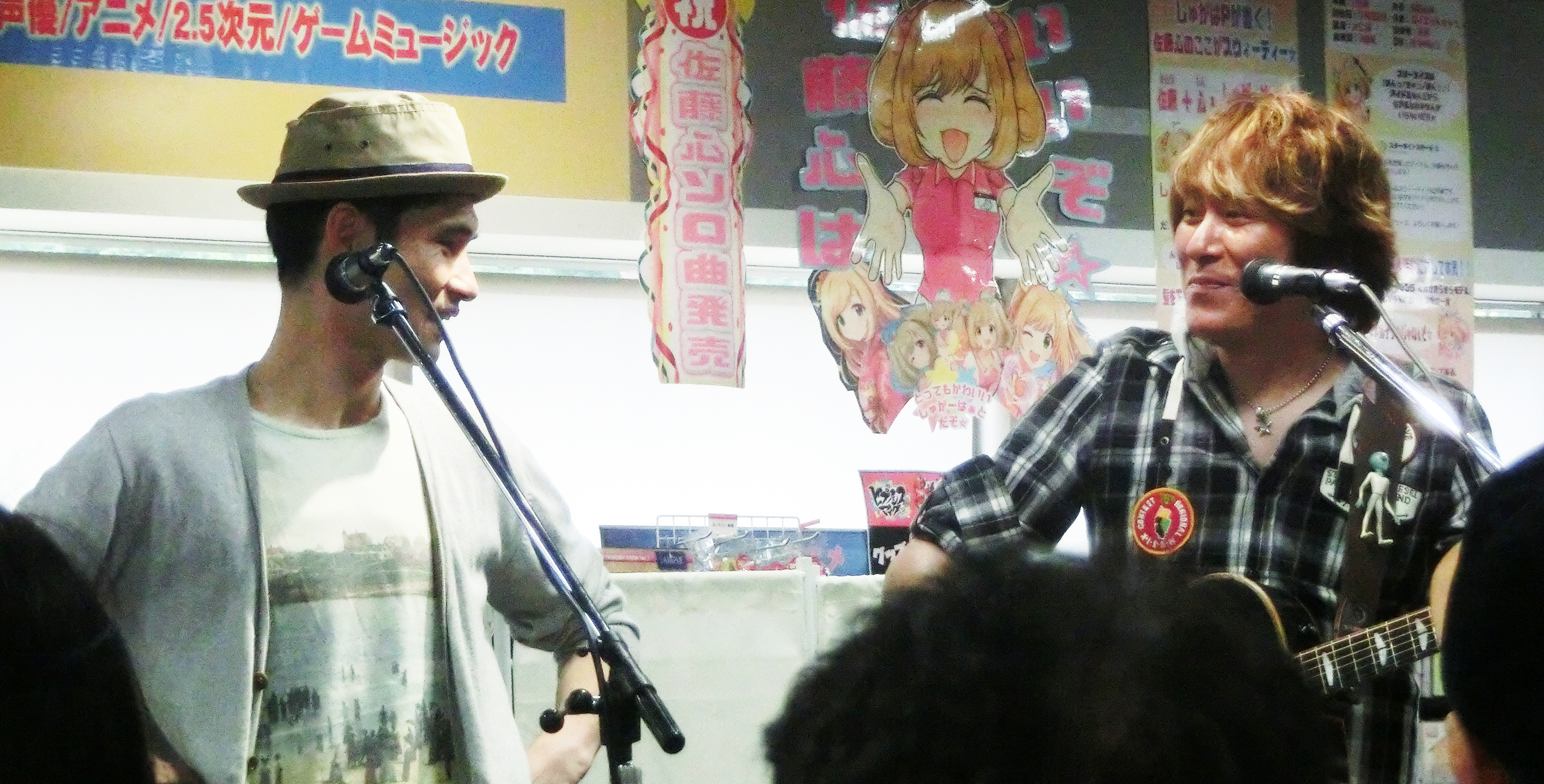
Brief & Trunks

Brief & Trunks (Japanese ブリーフ&トランクス) are a J-pop comedy duo that were originally active from 1993–2000, consisting of Takayuki Itou (伊藤多賀之) on vocals and guitar, and Makoto Hosone (細根誠) on vocals, who first met as students of a Shizuoka Prefecture high school. They released 12 singles, 12 albums and 4 videos, including their signature song "Konbini (Convenience Store)".

The duo disbanded on December 31, 2000. Itou continued activity in the independent music field. They reunited in 2016.

== Discography ==
=== Singles ===
1. Sanadamushi (May 21, 1998)
2. Futari No Himitsu (August 5, 1998)
3. Aonori (November 6, 1998)
4. Ensoku (March 3, 1999)
5. Hitori No Uta (August 25, 1999)
6. Kombini (November 20, 1999)
7. Ishiyaki Imo (January 21, 2000)
8. Pechapai (April 21, 2000)
9. Kenryoku Honey 〜Summer Version〜 (July 26, 2000)
10. Puchipuchi 〜Differ Version〜 (October 4, 2000)
11. Golden Ball (July 11, 2012)
12. Meramera Scream (June 4, 2014)

=== Albums ===
1. Buritora (June 3, 1998)
2. Sengo Saidai No Harmony (November 21, 1998)
3. Bokura No Ekisu (September 1, 1999)
4. Buritora No Hanran (May 1, 2000)
5. BURITORA GOLDEN BEST (December 6, 2000)
6. Goodjob, Baby (May 22, 2013)
7. Buritora Dochu Hizakurige (March 25, 2015)
8. Buritora Izonsho (March 2, 2016)
9. Tenohira Wo Mangetsu Ni (May 17, 2017)
10. BURITORA BEST BIBLE (March 21, 2018)
  1. BURITORA BEST BIBLE I
  2. BURITORA BEST BIBLE II
11. Buritora Maizokin (May 22, 2019)
12. Papepipuperopero (September 23, 2020)
