= Sayoko Izumi =

Japanese singer-songwriter and actress

Sayoko Izumi 泉彩世子
- Also known as: 泉沙世子
- Born: October 28, 1988 (age 37); Toyonaka, Osaka, Japan
- Origin: Tokyo, Japan
- Genres: Pop
- Occupations: Singer-songwriter, actress
- Instrument: Vocals
- Years active: 2012–2016
- Labels: King Records Japan; (2012-2014)
- Website: www.sayochan.com

Sayoko Izumi (泉彩世子, Izumi Sayoko; born October 28, 1988) is a Japanese singer-songwriter and actor from Toyonaka, Osaka Prefecture. She was signed to King Records (Japan) until January, 2015. She debuted in 2013 with the single "Scramble".

== Career ==
Sayoko Izumi was born in Toyonaka, Osaka, Japan, on October 28, 1988, but she went to grade school in Okayama Prefecture. She wanted to be a singer ever since she was 6 years old and auditioned for groups, such as Morning Musume, since she was 13 years old.

On May 26, 2012, she participated in King Records's 80th annual vocal audition called "KING RECORDS Presents Dream Vocal Audition", which took place at Akasaka BLITZ in Tokyo. She was one of the three winners of the audition, picked by with, and given the title "DREAM VOCALIST Loved by with". She signed a recording contract with King Records after winning. Songs by Izumi Sayoko were used in various King Records supported movies.

Her first release was a single titled "Scramble", which was released on November 21, 2012. The title song "Scramble" was used for the movie Karasu no Oyayubi. Her second release was a single titled "Kyōkai-sen/Iris", which came out on January 30, 2013. "Kyōkai-sen" was used in the movie Sayonara Debussy, which came out on January 26 of that year. On June 12, 2013, her third single "Tegami" came out, and was used in the movie and was used in the movie "The Serialist", which was based on the book by David Gordon (novelist). Her final release with King Records was "Kasu", which came out on January 15, 2014. This song was also used in the movie "Yokohama Monogatari", which Sayoko Izumi also co-starred in.

On November 7, 2014, she changed the Chinese characters of her name from "泉沙世子" to "泉彩世子". "Ai no Uta", released on January 16, 2015, was her first release as an independent artist.

== Discography ==
=== Singles ===
	Release date	Title	Format	Product Number	Japan Chart Rank
1st	Nov. 21, 2012	Scramble (スクランブル)	CD	KICM-1422	145
2nd	Jan. 30, 2013	Kyōkai-sen/Iris (境界線/アイリス)	CD	KICM-1432	67
3rd	June 12, 2013	Tegami (手紙)	CD	KICM-1450	136
4th	Jan. 15, 2014	Kasu (カス)	CD	KICM-1485	90
5th	Jan. 16, 2015	Ai no Uta (愛の詩)	CD	S001	
6th	Oct. 23, 2015	Natsu no Ato/Ichigatsu to Hachigatsu (夏の跡/1月と8月)	CD	S002	

== Filmography ==
=== Films ===
- Yokohama Monogatari, as (2013)
