= Sugar & Spite =

Unkle Bob

Studio album by Unkle Bob
- Released: 16 October 2006
- Genre: Indie
- Length: 37:19
- Label: Friendly Sounds
- Producer: Saul Davies

Professional ratings
Review scores
Source	Rating
Allmusic	4/5 stars

Sugar & Spite is the debut album from Unkle Bob, a Glasgow five piece who have been creating music together for around two years, forming whilst at college together. Produced by Saul Davies, guitarist and co-producer with British rock group James. The album was released in the UK on 16 October 2006.

== Track listing ==
1. "Birds and the Bees" – 3:21
2. "The Hit Parade" – 3:25
3. "One By One" – 2:40
4. "Better Off" – 3:48
5. "Put A Record On" – 3:43
6. "Hold It Down" – 3:16
7. "This Way" – 3:12
8. "Vagabond" – 3:49
9. "Too Many People" – 3:25
10. "Swans" – 2:30
11. "What Do I Know" – 4:12
