= Second to None (Chemistry album) =

Studio album by Chemistry
- Released: January 8, 2003
- Genre: R&B
- Length: 68:10
- Label: Sony Music Japan

Chemistry chronology
| The Way We Are (2003) | Second to None (2003) | Between the Lines (2003) |

Second to None is an album by the Japanese R&B duo Chemistry, released on January 8, 2003 by Sony Music Japan.

== Track listing ==
1. "Intro-lude~You're My Second to None~"
2. "It Takes Two"
3. "STILL ECHO"
4. "My Gift to You"
5. "Running Away"
6. "BACK TOGETHER AGAIN Interlude~@Electric Lady Studio, NYC~"
7. "No Color Line"
8. "FLOATIN'"
9. "SOLID DREAM"
10. "Let's Get Together Now (Tokyo Calling) Interlude~@Yuigahama, KAMAKURA~"
11. "RIPTIDE"
12. "月夜"
13. "マイウェイ"
14. "君をさがしてた～New Jersey United~(BONUS TRACK)"
