= HY (band) =

Japanese band

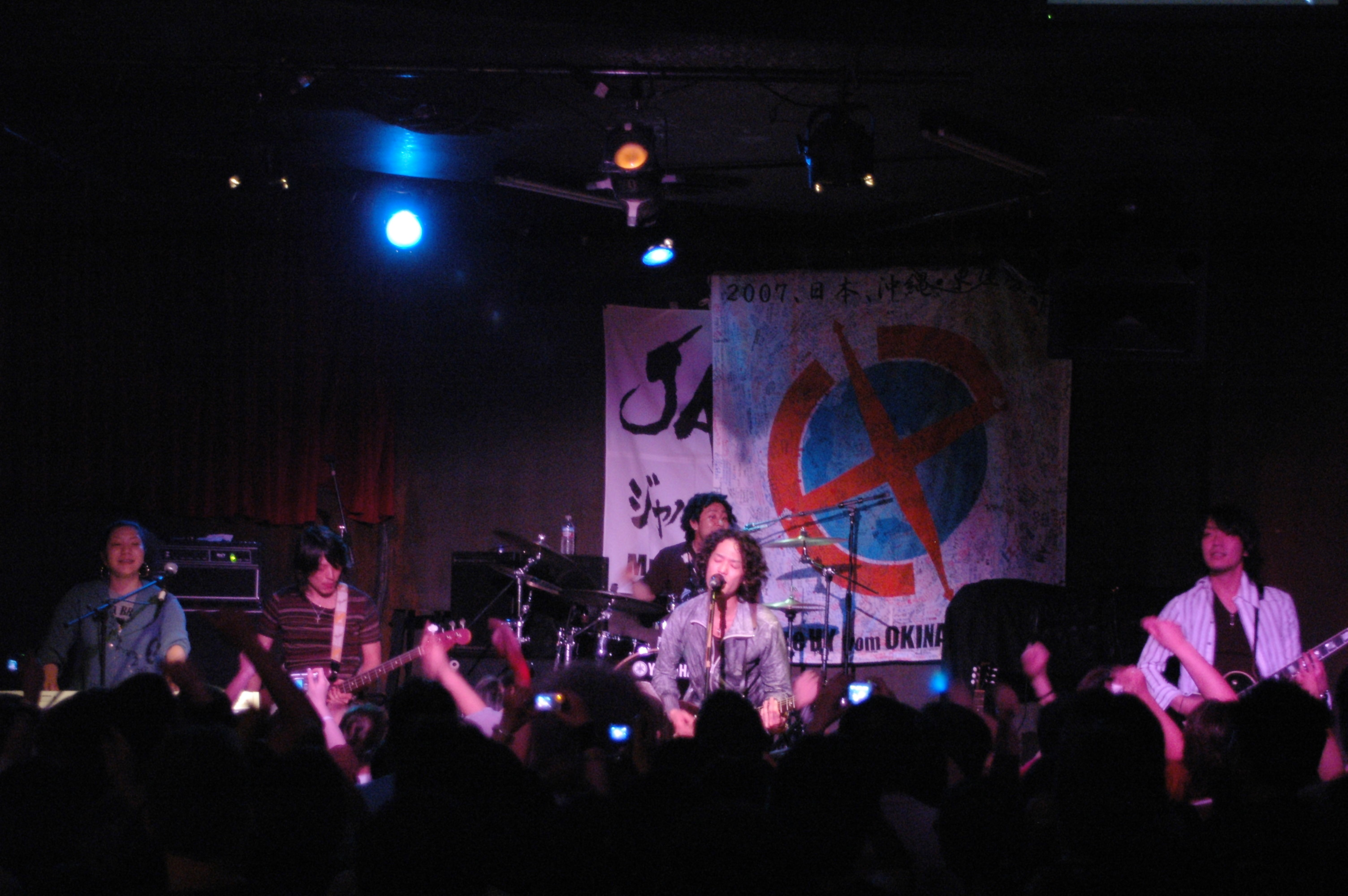
- HY performing at the J!-ENT LIVE, on 19 March 2007

Background information
- Origin: Okinawa, Japan
- Genres: Alternative rock
- Years active: 2000–present
- Labels: Higashiyakena; Universal J; Asse! Records; Polydor
- Members: Yūhei Miyazato; Shun Naka; Shinsuke Kyoda; Hideyuki Shinzato; Izumi Nakasone
- Website: HY Official Site

HY /ˌeɪtʃ ˈwaɪ/ is a Japanese rock band formed in 2000 by five high school friends from Okinawa.

== History ==
Their name comes from the initials of their hometown, Higashi Yakena. The band's popularity rose rapidly after a series of street performances; their debut album, Departure, released on 22 September 2001 (Okinawa-only), sold out immediately. In 2003, the band conducted a joint live performance with Linkin Park.

Their second album, Street Story, released on 16 April 2003 topped the Oricon charts, staying at number 1 for four straight weeks (Indies Artist Record). Their third album, Trunk, was released on 12 April 2004, and yet again debuted at number 1 — the first time such a feat has been accomplished by an indies artist.

The band's fourth album, Confidence released on 12 April 2006, debuted at number 1 and retained the top spot for two consecutive weeks. HY has sold out all of their solo concerts. Their 2006 tour was a 47-location nationwide tour which sold out the day that the tickets became available. The tour gathered over 88,000 people. In December 2006, HY's Kumakara Amae ("from the present to the future") concert held in Nippon Budokan and Osaka-jo Hall sold out immediately and gathered over 20,000 fans in two days. HY entered the international music scene, starting with their first-ever overseas tour, beginning in Toronto, Ontario, Canada, and extending to seven major US cities as part of the Japan Nite tour.

Their fifth album, HeartY, was released on 16 April 2008. The album debuted at number 2 and sold over 300,000 units to date.

In January 2010, HY's sixth album "whistle" was released. The band topped the Oricon chart. and December 2010, they performed at the 61st NHK Kohaku Uta Gassen. In December 2012, HY released their eighth album "Route 29" which contained the theme song of the NHK Asadora Jun to Ai and performed at the 63rd NHK Kohaku Uta Gassen.

In 2025, HY produced the theme song for the broadcasts of 97th Senbatsu Baseball Tournament, titled 'Hakkyuwo Tsunage' (白球を繋げ).

== Members ==
- Hideyuki Shinzato (新里 英之, Shinzato Hideyuki): Guitar, vocals (born 12 April 1983 (age 43))
- Shun Naka (名嘉 俊, Naka Shun): Drums, rap (born 10 May 1983 (age 43))
- Shinsuke Kyoda (許田 信介, Kyoda Shinsuke): Bass guitar (born 17 July 1983 (age 43))
- Izumi Nakasone (仲宗根 泉, Nakasone Izumi): Keyboard, vocals (born 1 November 1983 (age 42))
- Yūhei Miyazato (宮里 悠平, Miyazato Yūhei): Guitar (born 2 January 1984 (age 42)),

== Discography ==
=== Albums ===
- Departure (22 September 2001)
- Street Story (16 April 2003)
- Trunk (12 April 2004)
- Confidence (12 April 2006)
- HeartY (16 April 2008)
- Whistle (27 January 2010)
- ACHI SOUND ～HY LOVE SUMMER～ (11 August 2010)
- Parade (7 March 2012)
- Route 29 (5 December 2012)
- Glocal (26 February 2014)
