= Pieces of a Dream (Chemistry song) =

Single by Chemistry
- Released: March 7, 2001
- Genre: J-urban/J-pop
- Label: Defstar Records

"Pieces of a Dream" is the first single from the Japanese R&B (J-urban) band Chemistry.

== Overview ==
This was the first single from the duo that had won the Asayan held in Japan. Since the band won a contest similar to the American Idol show, the single was expected to be a success. Although the single debuted at #2 on the Oricon charts, it finally reached #1 after 6 weeks. For 15 weeks, it stayed in the top 10. Once it fell from the number one spot, it charted for another twenty-two weeks. "Pieces of a Dream" was the third-highest ranking single of 2001, selling over one million copies.

In 2016, the song was featured in the Anime, ReLIFE for episode 11 ending theme.

== Track list ==
1. "Pieces of a Dream"
2. "Two"
3. "Pieces of a Dream (Old School Mix)"
4. "Pieces of a Dream (Less Vocal)"

== Charts ==
Oricon Sales Chart (Japan)

Release	Chart	Peak position	Sales total
March 7, 2001	Oricon Daily Singles Chart	1	1,132,000
March 7, 2001	Oricon Weekly Singles Chart	1	1,132,000
March 7, 2001	Oricon Yearly Singles Chart	3	1,132,000
