= One X One =

Studio album by Chemistry
- Released: February 18, 2004
- Genre: R&B
- Length: 62:56
- Label: Sony Music Japan

Chemistry chronology
Between the Lines (2003)	One X One (2004)	Hot Chemistry (2005)

One X One is an album by the Japanese R&B duo Chemistry, released on February 18, 2004, by Defstar Records. It reached a peak position of number one on the Oricon albums chart.

== Track listing ==
1. "Intro-lude"
2. "Us"
3. "YOUR NAME NEVER GONE"
4. "my Rivets"
5. "This age"
6. "Bound for Identity～dear friend～"
7. "～Street Sounds of Naples, Italy～"
8. "meaning of tears"
9. "Ordinary hero"
10. "Now or Never"
11. "So in Vain"
12. "赤い雲 白い星"
13. "~Interlude~"
14. "アシタヘカエル"
15. "いとしい人"
