= List of Oricon number-one albums of 2012 =

The highest-selling albums and mini-albums in Japan are ranked in the Oricon Weekly Chart, published by Oricon Style magazine. The data is compiled by Oricon based on each album's weekly physical sales.

== Chart history ==
Issue Date	Album	Artist(s)	Reference(s)
January 2	Funky Monkey Babys 4	Funky Monkey Babys	
January 9	Exile Japan/Solo	Exile/Exile Atsushi	
January 16	Exile Japan/Solo	Exile/Exile Atsushi	
January 23	Exile Japan/Solo	Exile/Exile Atsushi	
January 30	Best Hit AKG	Asian Kung-Fu Generation	
February 6	Japonesque	Koda Kumi	
February 13	The Beginning	Ayaka	
February 20	Butterfly	L'Arc-en-Ciel	
February 27	Tokyo Collection	Tokyo Jihen	
March 5	Chain	KAT-TUN	
March 12	Newtral	Ikimono-gakari	
March 19	Newtral	Ikimono-gakari	
March 26	Next Encore	SDN48	
April 2	2012	Acid Black Cherry	
April 9	Kis-My-1st	Kis-My-Ft2	
April 16	Ano.. Namida ga Aru kara Ai ga Arun Desu Kedo. (あの・・涙があるから愛があるんですケド。; I Wish I Was Not In Love So I Would Not Cry)	Yusuke	
April 23	Shamanippon (Rakachi no Tohi) (shamanippon -ラカチノトヒ-; Shaman Japan (Human's power))	Tsuyoshi Domoto	
April 30	Kaza Uta Caravan (風歌キャラバン; Wind Song Caravan)	Naoto Inti Raymi	
May 7	Yuzu You [2006-2011]	Yuzu	
May 14	Yuzu You [2006-2011]	Yuzu	
May 21	Mr. Children 2005–2010 ＜macro＞	Mr. Children	
May 28	Mr. Children 2005–2010 ＜macro＞	Mr. Children	
June 4	Mr. Children 2005–2010 ＜macro＞	Mr. Children	
June 11	Just Crazy	Jang Keun-suk	
June 18	JUMP World	Hey! Say! JUMP	
June 25	NEWS Best	NEWS	
July 2	Toki no Silhouette (時のシルエット; Time's Silhouette)	Aiko	
July 9	Uncontrolled	Namie Amuro	
July 16	Uncontrolled	Namie Amuro	
July 23	Uncontrolled	Namie Amuro	
July 30	I Love You -Now & Forever-	Keisuke Kuwata	
August 6	I Love You -Now & Forever-	Keisuke Kuwata	
August 13	I Love You -Now & Forever-	Keisuke Kuwata	
August 20	Gift of SMAP	SMAP	
August 27	1830m	AKB48	
September 3	1830m	AKB48	
September 10	Code Name Blue	CN Blue	
September 17	All Singles Best 2	Kobukuro	
September 24	Perfume Global Compilation "Love the World"	Perfume	
October 1	Force	Superfly	
October 8	Opus (All Time Best 1975-2012)	Tatsuro Yamashita	
October 15	Gravity	Koichi Domoto	
October 22	Opus (All Time Best 1975-2012)	Tatsuro Yamashita	
October 29	8est	Kanjani Eight	
November 5	8est	Kanjani Eight	
November 12	Popcorn	Arashi	
November 19	Best Story (Life Stories)	Juju	
November 26	One Sexy Zone	Sexy Zone	
December 3	Nihon no Koi to, Yuming to. (日本の恋と、ユーミンと。; With Japanese Love and Yuming)	Yumi Matsutoya	
December 10	［(An Imitation) Blood Orange］	Mr. Children	
December 17	Exile Best Hits -Love Side/Soul Side-	Exile	
December 24	Exile Best Hits -Love Side/Soul Side-	Exile	
December 31	Barādon (バラー丼; Ballade Bowl)	Ikimono-gakari	

== See also ==
- 2012 in music
