= Allen Wheelis =

American psychoanalyst (1915–2007)

- Born: Allen Wheelis; October 23, 1915; Marion, Louisiana, USA
- Died: June 14, 2007 (aged 91); San Francisco, USA
- Education: University of Texas; College of Physicians and Surgeons at Columbia University; New York Psychoanalytic Institute

Allen Wheelis (October 23, 1915 – June 14, 2007) was an American psychoanalyst and writer who lived in San Francisco, CA. He achieved renown and success with his psychoanalytic practice, which spanned five decades despite the fact that he expressed ambivalence and doubt about the field and his own work in it. Wheelis died on June 14, 2007, at the age of 91 in a San Francisco hospital after receiving back surgery.

== Education ==
Wheelis attended the University of Texas. He graduated from the College of Physicians and Surgeons at Columbia University in 1943, and was certified in Psychology. He served in the U.S. Navy as a medical officer in the South Pacific from 1943 to 1946. After World War II, he studied at the Menninger Foundation in Topeka, Kansas, and worked at the Austen Riggs Center in Stockbridge, Massachusetts. He underwent further training at the New York Psychoanalytic Institute before moving in 1954 to San Francisco, where he remained in private practice until his death.

== Career ==
Allen Wheelis succeeded as a writer. Over a period of five decades, he crafted a series of novels while also writing a substantial body of wide-ranging works that has gone on to influence students and the educated public alike. He wrote prolifically, authoring 14 books including novels and memoirs, as well as several pieces for Commentary, The New Yorker, and various professional journals.

Many of Wheelis's writings have been acclaimed by critics. His writings are typified by a profound philosophical pessimism, and "drew heavily from his experiences as both a doctor and a man hobbled by neuroses". However, his wife Ilse Wheelis is not alone in pointing out that though Wheelis "had a pessimistic outlook on the human condition . . . he also celebrated it. He believed people could find happiness".

== Personal life ==
Weelis' wife, Ilse Kaulbach Wheelis (b. 1915, d. 9 January 2012) was also a psychiatrist and psychoanalyst, as is their daughter Joan Wheelis.

== Influence ==
A story that appeared in Wheelis's nonfiction book The Illusionless Man: Fantasies and Meditations on Disillusionment, published in 1966, was the basis of John Korty's film The Crazy-Quilt.

Wheelis's essay "Spirit" was included in Douglas Hofstadter and Daniel Dennett's 1981 collection The Mind's I: Fantasies and Reflections on Self and Soul.

In his book, How People Change: Freedom & Necessity, published in 1975, Wheelis describes in detail a defining story about his relationship with his father. The author states that these childhood events not only caused his writing but also what he writes and the conclusions he comes to. He sees in this the determinism he wants to destroy and asks how to get free of it.

== Quotes ==
"One can often recognize herd animals by their tendency to carry bibles."

"The sequence is suffering, insight, will, action, change."

"Desire is endless and unappeasable, is most intense where most forbidden, and is never far from despair."

"We must affirm freedom and responsibility without denying that we are the product of circumstance, and must affirm that we are the product of circumstance without denying that we have the freedom to transcend that causality to become something which could not even have been provisioned from the circumstances which shaped us."

== Bibliography ==
- The Quest for Identity (1959)
- The Seeker (novel)|The Seeker (1960)
- The Illusionless Man: Fantasies and Meditations on Disillusionment (1966)
- The Desert (1970)
- The Moralist (1973)
- The End of the Modern Age (1973)
- How People Change (1973)
- On Not Knowing How to Live (1975)
- The Scheme of Things (1980)
- The Doctor of Desire (1987)
- The Path Not Taken (1990)
- The Life and Death of My Mother (1992)
- The Way Things Are (1994)
- The Listener: A Psychoanalyst Examines His Life (1999)
- The Way We Are (2006)
