= Favorite Blue =

Japanese pop band

Favorite Blue was a Japanese pop band active from 1996 until 2000. Guitarist Takashi Kimura went on to become a record producer and composer for the band m.o.v.e. Vocalist Maya Matsuzaki left Favorite Blue's label, Avex and formed the band Mamy Drop (stylised in all lower case) independently. The band's most successful single was "Change by Me", which peaked at number 29 on the Oricon charts.

== Main members ==
- Takashi Kimura – guitar, keyboard, composer, arranger
- Maya Matsuzaki – vocals, lyrics

== Discography ==
=== Singles ===
- 'Ai yorimo Hageshiku, Dare yorimo Itoshiku' (12 June 1996)
- 'Active, my dream' (25 September 1996)
- 'SHAKE ME UP!' (27 November 1996)
- 'Movin'oN' (30 April 1997)
- 'Change by Me' (30 July 1997)
- 'true gate' (21 August 1997)
- 'Sayonara yori Eien no Naka de' (3 December 1997)
- 'Missing Place' (21 January 1998)
- 'close my love' (15 July 1998)
- 'Let me go!' (5 November 1998)
- 'truth of love' (2 December 1998)
- 'PRIDE -close to you-' (31 March 1999)
- 'solitude' (8 May 1999)
- 'next days' (22 September 1999)
- 'sometime, somewhere' (26 January 2000)

=== Albums ===
- DREAM & MEMORIES (5 February 1997)
- Missing place (18 February 1998)
- FB in the remix (12 August 1998)
- solitude (16 June 1999)
- FB BEST -eternal trax- (2 February 2000)

=== DVD ===
- FB BEST -eternal pictures- (2 February 2000)

=== Video ===
- FB visual trax (26 August 1998)
- FB visual trax II (2 February 2000)
