= Misato Watanabe =

Japanese singer (born 1966)

Misato Watanabe 渡辺美里
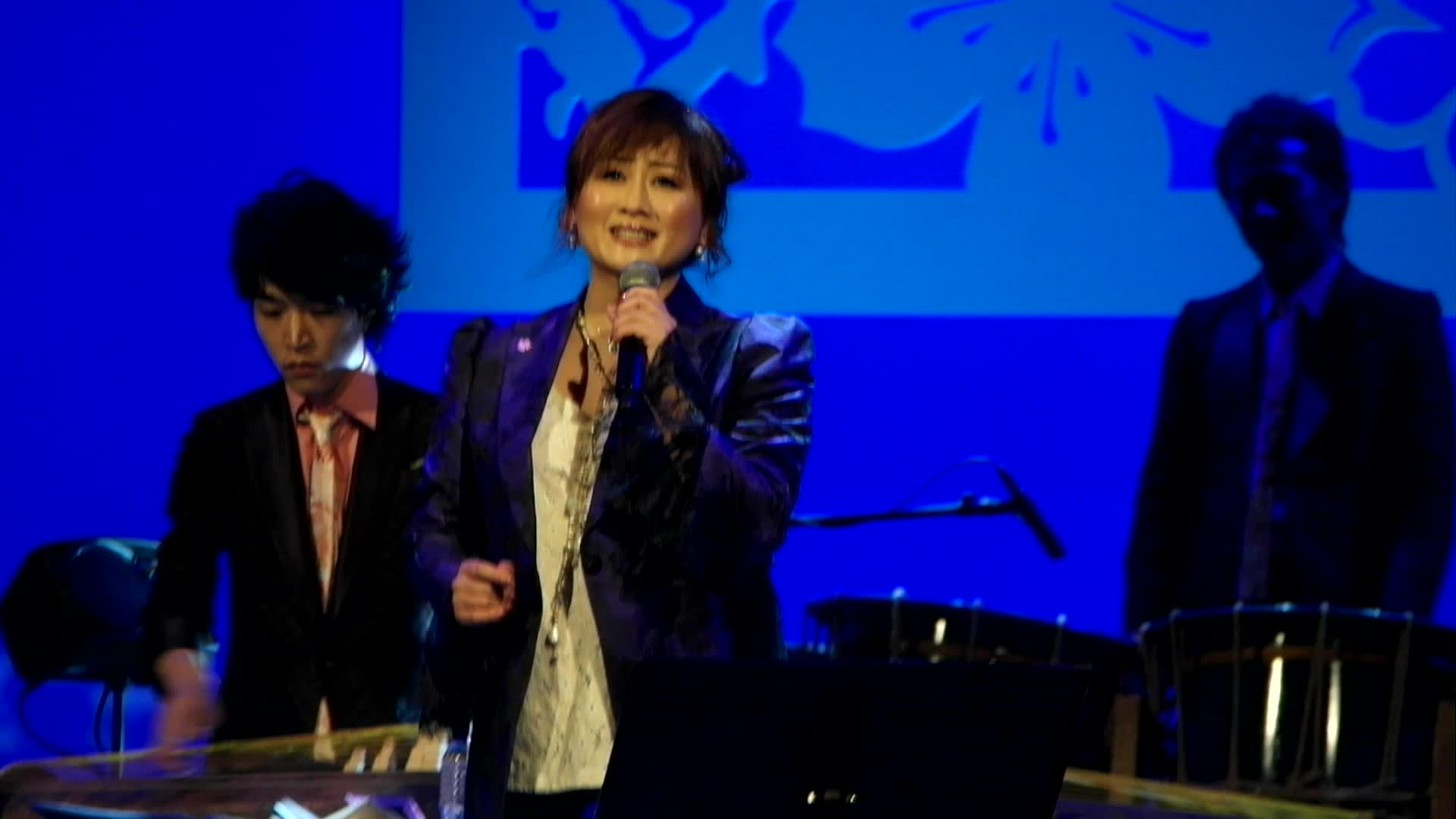
- Misato Watanabe performing in Washington, DC, in 2015

Background information
- Born: 12 July 1966 (age 59); Seika, Kyoto, Japan
- Genres: Japanese pop
- Occupation: Singer
- Years active: 1985–present
- Label: Epic Records Japan
- Website: misatowatanabe.com

Misato Watanabe (渡辺 美里, Watanabe Misato; born 12 July 1966) is a Japanese pop singer.

== Discography ==
=== Albums ===
- Eyes (2 October 1985)
- Lovin' you (2 July 1986)
- Breath (15 July 1987)
- Ribbon (28 May 1988)
- Flower bed (1 July 1989)
- Tokyo (7 July 1990)
- Lucky (6 July 1991)
- Hello Lovers (8 July 1992)
- Big Wave (21 July 1993)
- Baby Faith (7 September 1994)
- She loves you (15 July 1995)
- Live Love Life (13 November 1995)
- Spirits (12 July 1996)
- Hadaka no Kokoro (1 July 1998)
- Sweet 15th Diamond (Compilation Album) (19 July 2000)
- Love Go Go!!|Love♥Go Go!! (19 July 2000)
- Uta no Ki - Gift (6 December 2000)
- Cafe mocha - Uta no Ki -|Café mocha – Uta no Ki - (20 March 2002)
- soleil (10 July 2002)
- The Legend Misato Watanabe Golden 80's Collection (Compilation Album) (1 January 2003)
- Orange (Watanabe Misato)|ORANGE (6 August 2003)
- Blue Butterfly (14 July 2004)
- Uta no Ki seasons "Fuyu" (17 November 2004)
- Uta no Ki seasons "Haru" (23 February 2005)
- Uta no Ki seasons "Natsu" (25 May 2005)
- M Renaissance (13 July 2005)
- Uta no Ki seasons "Aki" (24 August 2005)
- Sing and Roses – Uta to Bara no Hibi - (23 November 2005)
- Kokoro Ginga (4 July 2007)
- Dear My Songs (8 October 2008)
- Song Is Beautiful (Watanabe Misato)|Song Is Beautiful (Best Album) (27 January 2010)
- Serendipity (3 August 2011)
- ID (7 August 2019)

=== Singles ===
- 'I'm Free' (2 May 1985)
- 'Growin' Up' (25 August 1985)
- 'Shinderu mitai ni Ikitaku nai (=Don't want to live like the dead)' (5 December 1985)
- 'My Revolution' (12 January 1986)
- 'Teenage Walk' (2 May 1986)
- 'Long Night' (21 July 1986)
- 'Believe' (22 October 1986)
- 'It's Tough / Boys Cried (Ano toki kara kamo shirenai (=Perhaps from that time))' (2 May 1987)
- 'Kanashii ne (=Sad, isn't it?)' (2 December 1987)
- 'Koi shitatte Ii janai (=Love as I want to)' (21 April 1988)
- 'Senchimentaru Kangarū (=Sentimental Kangaroo)' (21 July 1988)
- 'Kimi no Yowasa (=Your weakness) / 10 years' (21 October 1988)
- 'Mūnraito Dansu (=Moonlight Dance)' (1 June 1989)
- 'Suki (=I love you)(Apricot Mix)' (1 September 1989)
- 'Niji o Mitakai (=Have you ever seen the Rainbow?)' (21 October 1989)
- 'Samãtaimu Burūsu (=Summertime Blues) / Boys kiss Girls' (12 May 1990)
- 'Koi suru Pankusu (=Punks in Love)' (1 July 1990)
- 'Home Planet – Chikyū koso Watashi no Ie (=The Earth is my home) -' (22 August 1990)
- 'Power – Ashita no Kodomo (=Children of the future) -' (21 September 1990)
- 'Sotsugyo(=Graduation)' (18 April 1991)
- 'Natsu ga Kita! (=Summer has come!)' (21 June 1991)
- 'Kurisumasu made Matenai (Yukidaruma Version) (=I can't wait until Christmas)' / Jump (Daimajin Version) (21 November 1991)
- 'My Revolution -Dai 2 sho-(Chapter Two)' (22 April 1992)
- 'Naichaisou dayo (=About to cry)' (10 June 1992)
- 'Merī-gõ-rando (=Merry-Go-Round) / Aozora (=Blue Sky) (21 November 1992)
- 'Itsuka Kitto (=Someday, surely)' (1 February 1993)
- 'Big Wave Yatte kita (=All the way came the Big Wave)/ Sunao ni Nakeru Hi Waraeru Hi (=The days I could cry and laugh honestly)' (1 July 1993)
- 'Manatsu no Santakurõsu (=Midsummer's Santa Claus)' (21 May 1994)
- 'Cheri ga Mittsu Narabanai (=Three cherries going different ways)' (1 August 1994)
- 'Sincerely' (1 February 1995)
- 'Sekai de Ichiban Tōi Basho (=The farthest place in the world)' (1 June 1995)
- 'My Love Your Love – Tatta Hitori sika inai Anata he (=To the one and only you)-' (17 June 1996)
- 'Issho dane (=We will be together, won't we?)' (28 May 1997)
- 'Natsu no Uta (=The Summer Song)' (30 July 1997)
- 'Sugao (=Natural face)' (21 February 1998)
- 'Taiyō wa Shitte iru (=Summer knows)' (20 June 1998)
- 'Atarashii Hibi (=The new days) / Kurisumasu wa Dōsuru no (=What are you doing for Christmas?)' (21 November 1998)
- 'Motto Toku he (=Further away) / Shinkokyū (=Deep breath)' (24 May 2000)
- 'Araburu Mune no Shinbaru Narase (=Hit the cymbal of my careless heart)' (2 August 2000)
- 'Natsuyaki Tamago (=The summer burning egg)' (18 July 2001)
- 'Yasashiku Utatte (=Sing softly) – Killing me softly with his song -' (20 February 2002)
- 'You – Atarashii Basho (=The new venue) – / Hana (=Flower) – Kono Boku de Ikite Yuku (=I'll live with this me) -' (24 April 2002)
- '12 gatsu no Kamisama (=God of December)' (4 December 2002)
- 'Doraemon no Uta (=The song of Doraemon)' (18 June 2003) – An opening song for Doraemon
- 'Koyubi (=Little finger)' (16 July 2003)
- 'Jũ no Himitsu (=10 Secrets)' (17 December 2003)
- 'Tomato / No Side' (19 October 2005)
- 'Onegai Taiyō – natsu no kiseki (=Please sun – The miracle (or footstep) of summer)' (21 June 2006)
- 'Aoi Tori (=Blue bird)' (27 September 2006)
- 'Sono te o tsunaide (=Take that hand)' (14 March 2007)
- 'yes' (6 February 2008)

=== DVD ===
- Seibu Stadium Live History 1986 – 1999 – Sweet 15th Diamond Born 2000 - (19 July 2000)
- Uta no Ki – Welcome (6 December 2000)
- Misato Born Aug 1986 – Mar 1987 (21 November 2001)
- Misato born II Aug 1987 – mar 1988 (21 November 2001)
- Misato – sad songs born II special edition (21 November 2001)
- Misato born III Flower bed from eZ the Movie (21 November 2001)
- Misato born IV Ai to Kando no Cho-Seishun Live (21 November 2001)
- Misato born V tokyo 1990 (21 November 2001)
- Misato born special version misato clips (21 November 2001)
- Ultra Misato born VI (21 November 2001)
- Stadium Densetsu born VII (21 November 2001)
- Misato born 8 Brand New Heaven (21 November 2001)
- She loves you born 9 10th anniversary video collection 1985 – 1995 (21 November 2001)
- Misato born 10 Free Spirits Tour (21 November 2001)
- Jya Jya Uma Narashi Tour '02 (3 December 2003)
- Stadium Legend forever 1986 – 2005 BORN FINAL (21 December 2005)
- Misato Stadium Legend V20 saishusho No Side (21 June 2006)
- Uta no ki gift box (29 November 2006)
- Voice I (18 July 2007)
- Misato Matsuri 2006 (Blu-ray Disc) (5 December 2007)
