= Lindberg (band) =

Japanese musical group

- Origin: Japan
- Genres: Pop rock/rock
- Years active: 1989–2002, 2009, 2014
- Labels: Japan Record/Public Image; The 246 Label; Polydor Records; Publi; Meldac; Avex Trax
- Past members: Maki Watase; Tatsuya Hirakawa; Tomohisa Kawazoe; Masanori Koyanagi
- Website: avexnet.or.jp/lindberg

Lindberg is a Japanese Pop rock/rock band that was active from 1989 to 2002, reuniting for a short time in 2009 to celebrate the band's 20th anniversary. After another hiatus, the band announced their return in January 2014 with a YouTube announcement titled "Re:LINDBERG", followed by a 25th anniversary concert at Zepp Tokyo in April 2014 and live tours of Japan in 2015 and 2017.

== History ==
Lindberg typically appealed to the junior high to early high school crowd. The band retired in 2002 following the marriage of the lead singer, Watase Maki, to the lead guitarist Hirakawa Tatsuya; rounding out the band were bassist Kawazoe Tomohisa and drummer Koyanagi "Cherry" Masanori.

Kawazoe Tomohisa, one of the band's musicians, became a founding member of another Japanese female-fronted Pop/Rock band, Ai+Band, in 2003.

Lindberg reunited in 2009 and released their twentieth anniversary album Lindberg XX in April 2009 through their new label Avex Trax, featuring new songs and re-recordings of their popular hits. Also in 2009, Lindberg members Maki Watase and Tatsuya Hirakawa began writing and producing music for Jurian Beat Crisis, a Japanese singer that debuted that year.

== Discography ==
=== Albums ===
- Lindberg I (1989)
- Lindberg II (1989)
- Lindberg III (1990)
- Lindberg IV (1991)
- Lindberg Extra Flight (1991)
- Lindberg V (1992)
- Lindberg Flight Recorder 1989-1992: Little Wing (1992)
- Lindberg VI (1993)
- Lindberg Extra Flight II (1993)
- Lindberg Lindy Wingding (1994)
- Lindberg VII (1994)
- Lindberg VIII (1995)
- Lindberg IX (1996)
- Lindberg X (1997)
- Lindberg XI (1998)
- Lindberg XII (1999)
- Lindberg XIII (2001)
- Lindberg XIV (2002)
- Lindberg XV (2002)
- Lindberg XX: The 20th Anniversary (2009)

=== Singles ===
- ROUTE 246 (April 25, 1989)
- 今すぐKiss Me (Ima sugu Kiss Me) (February 7, 1990)
- JUMP (March 28, 1990)
- Dream On 抱きしめて (Dream On dakishimete) (September 26, 1990)
- ROUGH DIAMOND (October 24, 1990)
- OH! ANGEL (November 21, 1990)
- GLORY DAYS (March 27, 1991)
- BELIEVE IN LOVE (July 3, 1991)
- I MISS YOU (October 18, 1991)
- 恋をしようよ Yeah! Yeah! (Koi wo shiyou yo Yeah! Yeah!) (April 22, 1992)
- さよならBeautiful Days / 千年たっても (Sayonara Beautiful Days / Sennen tatte mo) (November 6, 1992)
- Magical Dreamer (November 13, 1992)
- 胸さわぎのAfter School (Munesawagi no After School) (March 17, 1993)
- 会いたくて～Lover Soul~ (Aitakute ~Lover Soul~) (June 18, 1993)
- 想い出のWater Moon / 君に吹く風 (Omoide no Water Moon / Kimi ni fuku kaze) (August 11, 1993)
- だってそうじゃない!? (Datte sou ja nai!?) (October 22, 1993)
- 大キライ！ / 二人きりで行こうよ (Daikirai! / Futari kiri de ikou yo) (November 12, 1993)
- 夢であえたら / とびきりの夜 (Yume de aetara / Tobikiri no yoru) (December 1, 1993)
- GAMBAらなくちゃね (GAMBAranakucha ne) (March 16, 1993)
- 清く正しく行こう (Kiyoku tadashiku ikou) (May 18, 1994)
- さよならをあげる (Sayonara wo ageru) (March 16, 1995)
- 水着とBeachとBoys (Mizugi to Beach to Boys) (May 2, 1995)
- もっと愛しあいましょ (Motto aishiaimasho) (November 1, 1995)
- 君のいちばんに・・・ (Kimi no ichiban ni...) (May 1, 1996)
- every little thing every precious thing (July 1, 1996, 2007) - a theme song at Hanshin Koshien Stadium for Kyuji Fujikawa, a pitcher for the Hanshin Tigers baseball team
- Green eyed Monster (August 19, 1996)
- YAH! YAH! YAH! (February 13, 1997)
- 明日は明日の風が吹く (Ashita wa ashita no kaze ga fuku) (April 16, 1997)
- Sugar Free (May 28, 1997)
- 風 (Kaze) (March 4, 1998)
- 願いがかなうように (Negai ga kanau you ni) (October 21, 1999)
- frosty love (February 21, 2001)
- you were there (January 1, 2002)
- Teenage Blue (June 26, 2002)
- it's too late (August 7, 2002)
- Live Your Life (December 9, 2009) - last single overall and first single under Avex Group

=== Compilations ===
- Lindberg Best - Flight Recorder III (1998)

=== DVD ===
- Lindberg Flight Series Perfect DVD Box (2014)
- Lindberg All Time Music Video History (2017)
