= Chemistry (band) =

Japanese Pop/R&B duo (formed 1999)

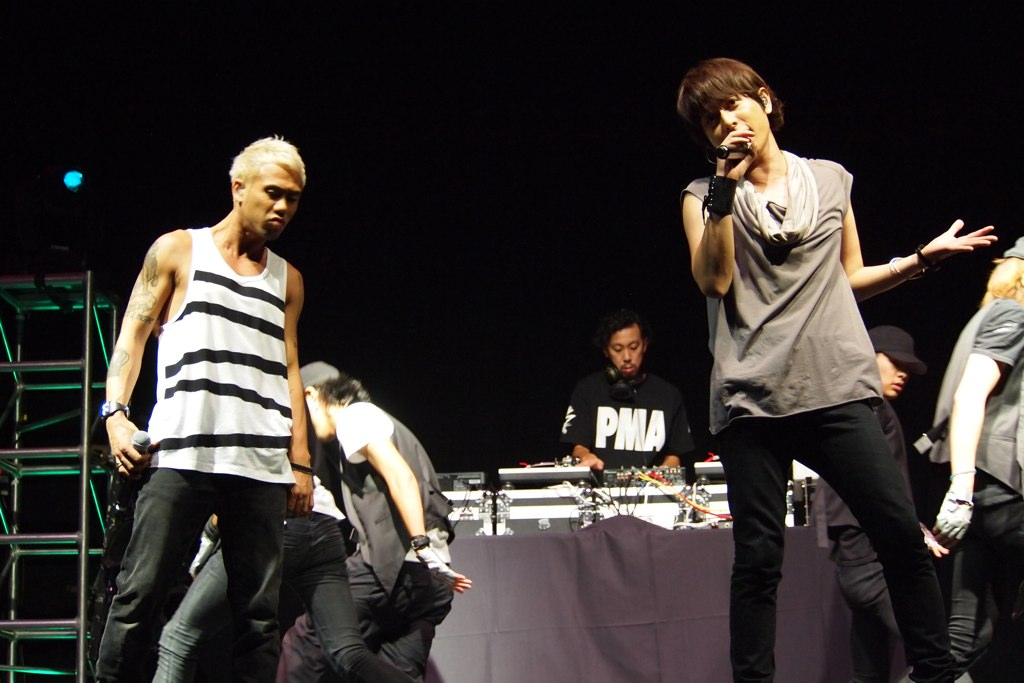
- Chemistry performing at Otakon 2011

Background information
- Also known as: Kemi
- Origin: Japan
- Genres: J-pop; R&B
- Years active: 2001–2012, 2017–present
- Label: DefSTAR
- Members: Yoshikuni Dōchin; Kaname Kawabata
- Website: www.chemistry-official.net

Chemistry (stylized in all caps) is a Japanese pop duo, consisting of Yoshikuni Dōchin (堂珍 嘉邦; born November 17, 1978) and Kaname Kawabata (川畑 要; born January 28, 1979).

== History ==
They were the winners of the Asayan audition (similar to the American Idol series) in 2000 organized by Sony Music Entertainment Japan.

Their first single "Pieces of a Dream" was released on March 3, 2001, and was the best selling single that year (over 2 million). Most of their singles have reached #1 on the Oricon charts; all five albums have reached #1 the day they were released. Their #1 streak was broken by the KinKi Kids' album H Album: Hand, scoring them a #2 rank for Fo(u)r.

Chemistry is also known in Korea for the popular collaboration song "Let's Get Together Now," featuring talents from both Korea and Japan and for collaborating with Korean singer Lena Park who appears in the B-side "Dance with Me" on the "Kimi ga Iru" single.

Their song "Tookage" plays during the credits of the Japanese dub of Open Season.

On March 6, 2008, Kaname Kawabata married model Miki Takahashi. They met after she appeared in the PV for "This Night."

Their single "Period" was selected as the fourth opening for the anime series Fullmetal Alchemist: Brotherhood.

In 2010, Chemistry worked together with the 4-person dance group Synergy to release "Shawty". Another joint work of the two groups was released November 3, 2010, titled "Keep Your Love".

In 2011, Chemistry was tapped by Bandai Visual to record a song for the OVA series, Mobile Suit Gundam Unicorn, due to be the title song for the 3rd episode, "The Ghost of Laplace". "Merry-go-round" is due for release on March 2, 2011, as a follow-up before the OVA's actual release on March 5, 2011.

Their 15th single "Wings of Words" was used as the fourth opening theme for Mobile Suit Gundam SEED Destiny from PHASE-38 to 49. Chemistry performed this song live in collaboration with the two-time Olympic champion in figure skating, Yuzuru Hanyu, at the 2018 Fantasy on Ice in Makuhari and Kanazawa. Kawabata made a solo appearance in the 2016 edition of the ice show as well.

After going on hiatus in 2012 so that both members could focus on pursuing solo careers, the pair resumed activities as a musical duo in 2017. Their new single "Windy" was used as the second ending theme song for the anime adaptation of Altair: A Record of Battles.

== Discography ==
=== Albums ===
Year	Album details	Oricon chart	Rating
2001	The Way We Are: Released: November 7, 2001	1	
2003	Second to None: Released: January 8, 2003	1	
2003	Between the Lines: Released: June 18, 2003	1	
2004	One X One: Released: February 18, 2004	1	
2005	Hot Chemistry: Released: January 26, 2005	1	
2005	Fo(u)r: Released: November 16, 2005	2	
2006	Re:fo(u)rm: Released: August 9, 2006	25	
2006	All the Best: Released: November 22, 2006	1	
2008	Face to Face: Released: January 30, 2008	3	AllMusic
2008	Winter of Love: Released: November 19, 2008	7	AllMusic
2009	The Chemistry Joint Album: Released: March 11, 2009	10	AllMusic
2010	Regeneration: Released: February 24, 2010	7	AllMusic
2011	Chemistry 2001–2011: Released: March 2, 2011	6	
2012	Trinity: Released: January 25, 2012	8	
2019	Chemistry: Released: September 25, 2019	12	
2022	The Best & More 2001–2022: Released: February 16, 2022	13	
2024	Blue Chemistry: Released: March 6, 2024	23	
2026	Still Shine: Her Songs, Our Harmony: Released: March 4, 2026	25	

=== Singles ===
Year	Title	Oricon chart		Album
Year	Title	Peak position	Weeks on chart	Album
2001	"Pieces of a Dream"	1	32	The Way We Are
2001	"Point of No Return"	1	22	The Way We Are
2001	"You Go Your Way"	1	14	The Way We Are
2002	"Kimi o Sagashiteta (New Jersey United)" (君をさがしてた ～New Jersey United～)	2	12	Second to None
2002	"Floatin'"	1	6	Second to None
2002	"It Takes Two"	1	14	Second to None
2002	"My Gift to You"	4	2	Second to None
2003	"Ashita e Kaeru" (アシタヘカエル)	1	13	One X One
2003	"Your Name Never Gone"	2	13	One X One
2004	"So in Vain"	3	6	One X One
2004	"Mirage in Blue"	4	7	One X One
2004	"Long Long Way"	4	6	Fo(u)r
2004	"Shiroi no Toiki" (白の吐息)	8	6	Hot Chemistry
2005	"Kimi ga Iru" (キミがいる)	4	9	Fo(u)r
2005	"Wings of Words"	2	12	Fo(u)r
2005	"Almost in Love"	6	8	Fo(u)r
2006	"Yakusoku no Basho" (約束の場所)	4	11	Face to Face
2006	"Tōkage" (feat. John Legend (遠影)	9	5	Face to Face
2006	"Top of the World"	28	5	All the Best
2007	"Sora no Kiseki" (空の奇跡)	9	4	Face to Face
2007	"This Night"	13	5	Face to Face
2007	"Saigo no Kawa"	4	11	Face to Face
2007	"Kagayaku Yoru" (supported by Monkey Majik) (輝く夜)	18	3	Face to Face
2008	"Life goes on"	12	5	Regeneration
2008	"Koisuru Yuki Aisuru Sora" (恋する雪 愛する空)	16	4	Winter of Love
2009	"A Place for Us" (with Toko Furuuchi)	21	2	The Chemistry Joint Album
2009	"Ano Hi" (feat. Dohzi-T/Once Again (あの日 (feat. Dohzi-T))	19	4	Regeneration
2010	"Period"	12	1	Regeneration
2010	"Shawty" (Chemistry + Synergy)	18	3	Chemistry 2001–2011
2010	"Keep Your Love" (Chemistry + Synergy)	11	3	Chemistry 2001–2011
2011	"A Better Tomorrow"	16	2	Chemistry 2001–2011
2011	"Merry-go-round"	19	1	Chemistry 2001–2011
2011	"Independence"	17	1	Trinity
2011	"Eternal Smile"	19	1	Trinity
2019	"Angel/Still Walking"	20	2	TBA

=== Videos ===
Year	Title	Oricon chart
2002	R.A.W. ~Respect and Wisdom- Chemistry Acoustic Live: Released: April 10, 2002; Formats: DVD, VHS	
2003	Chemistry the Videos: 2001-2002 ~What You See is What You Get~: Released: February 14, 2003; Formats: DVD, VHS	
2003	Two as We Stand ~Live and Documentary 2002-2003~: Released: September 10, 2003; Formats: DVD, VHS	
2005	Chemistry in Suntory Hall ~Hibiki~: Released: January 26, 2005; Formats: DVD, UMD	
2006	Chemistry the Videos: 2003-2006 ~We Sing, Therefore, We Are~: Released: August 9, 2006; Formats: DVD, VHS	16
2006	Chemistry 2006 Tour Fo(u)r: Released: November 22, 2006; Formats: Blu-ray	
