= Kyosuke Himuro =

Japanese musician (born 1960)

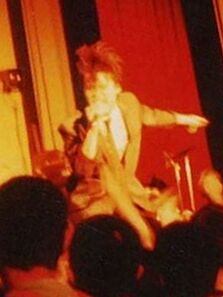
- Himuro performing with Boøwy, 1984

Background information
- Born: October 7, 1960 (age 65); Takasaki, Gunma, Japan
- Genres: Rock; pop
- Occupations: Musician; singer; songwriter
- Instruments: Vocals; guitar
- Years active: 1978–2016
- Labels: Toshiba-EMI; Polydor; EMI Music Japan; Warner Music Japan
- Formerly of: Boøwy
- Website: himuro.com

Kyosuke Himuro (Japanese: 氷室 京介, Hepburn: Himuro Kyōsuke; born October 7, 1960, in Takasaki, Gunma) is a Japanese former musician and singer-songwriter. He was the lead vocalist of the rock band Boøwy from 1981 to 1988. After the band disbanded, he went on to have a successful solo career, becoming one of Japan's best-selling artists, with 16.25 million sales. In 2003, HMV Japan ranked Boøwy at number 22 and Himuro himself at number 76 on their list of the 100 most important Japanese pop acts. Himuro retired from live performances in 2016 due to hearing impairment. He currently lives in Los Angeles, California.

== Career ==
Himuro has frequently played music with American guitarist Steve Stevens, best known for his work with Billy Idol. Stevens participated in Himuro's album as a guitarist and his concert tour after his album I·DÉ·A.

Himuro's fourth album, 1993's Memories of Blue, became his first to sell over one million copies.

On August 22, 2004, he held a concert entitled "21st Century Boøwys Vs Himuro" at the Tokyo Dome. It marked the first time he sang Boøwy songs in sixteen years.

"Wild Romance" was used as the ending theme song for the Japanese dubbed version of Van Helsing and for the Japanese releases of Yakuza 5.

Himuro's song "Calling", from his 1989 album Neo Fascio, was used in the ending credits to the 2005 film Final Fantasy VII Advent Children. The film's director, Tetsuya Nomura, noted that Himuro's music has been highly influential in his own work. When asked about his contribution to the film, Himuro said that he was happy his work would be used in "the best CG movie ever made in Japan".

From August 5 to August 6, 2006, he held a concert called "Kyosuke Himuro + Glay 2006 at Ajinomoto-Stadium "Swing Addition"" with Japanese rock band Glay in Ajinomoto Stadium. In addition, Himuro released his first collaborated single with Glay, called "Answer", on August 2, 2006.

Himuro released the compilation album 20th Anniversary All Singles Complete Best "Just Movin' On" ~All The-S-Hit~ on June 11, 2008. It became his tenth number-one album, making Himuro the solo artist with the most number one albums after breaking off from a group.

The Japanese release of Final Fantasy VII Advent Children Complete featured a new ending song by Himuro, "Safe and Sound", which features American rock band My Chemical Romance's lead singer Gerard Way and replaces "Calling". "Safe and Sound" was released on the iTunes Store on April 29, 2009. However, the North American release continues to use "Calling" instead of "Safe and Sound".

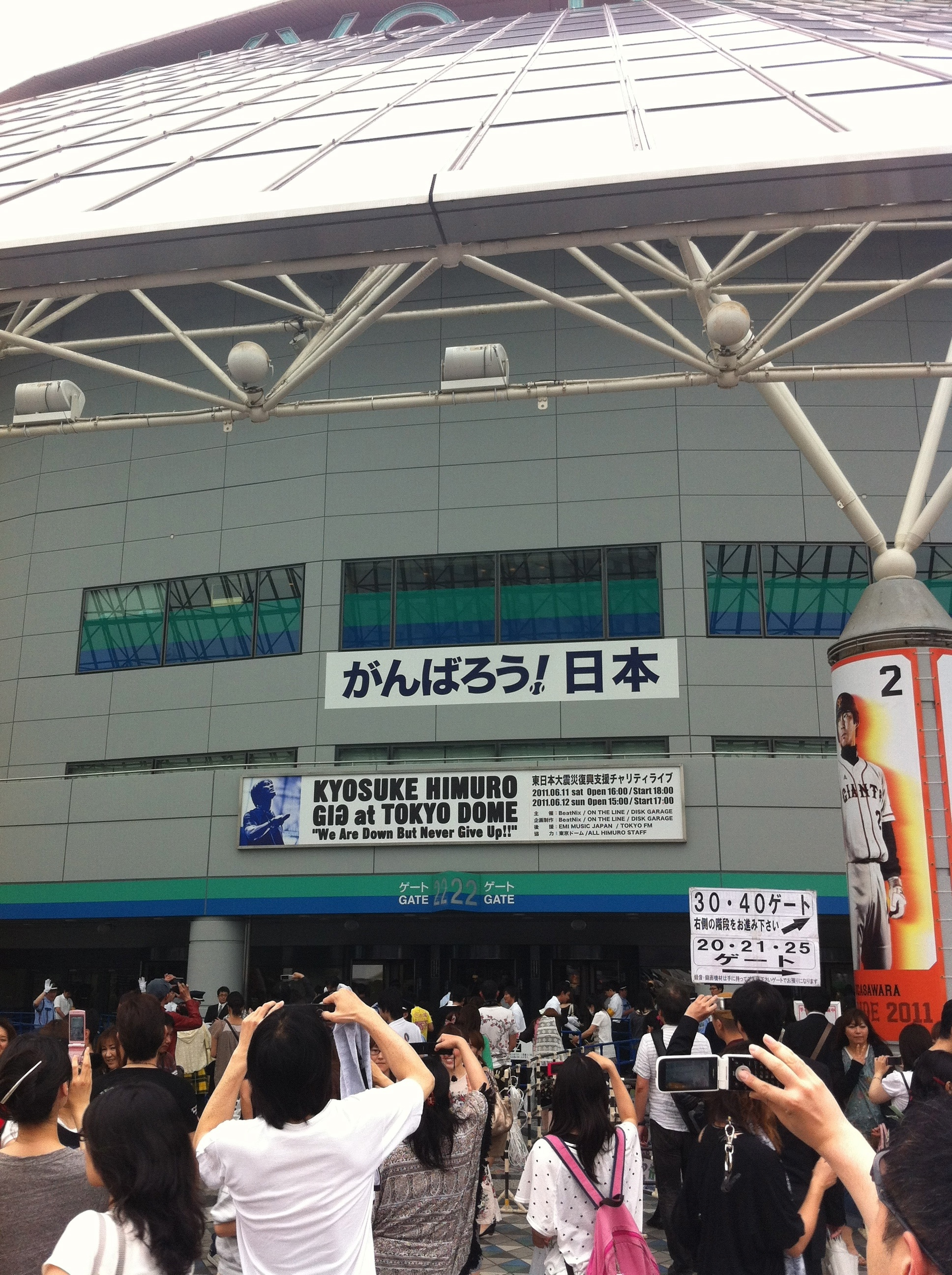
Fans outside Himuro's June 12, 2011, concert at the Tokyo Dome

Himuro held two consecutive sold-out charity concerts at the Tokyo Dome on June 11 and 12, 2011 which attracted over 104,000 people, making them the biggest charity live event ever held in Japan. The raised sum of 669,220,940 yen (around US$8.7 million) was donated to Fukushima, Miyagi, and Iwate prefectures for recovery after the 2011 Tōhoku earthquake and tsunami.

In 2016, he held a retirement tour in Japan, called "Kyosuke Himuro Last Gigs", and officially retired from live performances due to his hearing impairment.

In 2020, he revealed he was working on music for a new album, but as of 2025, nothing has officially been announced. That same year, he sang on B'z guitarist Tak Matsumoto's album Bluesman on the song "Actually".

== Discography ==
=== Studio albums ===
- Flowers for Algernon (September 1, 1988), Oricon Weekly Albums Chart Peak Position: No. 1
- Neo Fascio (September 27, 1989) No. 1
- Higher Self (April 6, 1991) No. 1
- Memories of Blue (January 7, 1993) No. 1
- Shake the Fake (September 26, 1994) No. 1
- Missing Piece (September 30, 1996) No. 1
- I·DÉ·A (December 10, 1997) No. 1
- Mellow (February 23, 2000) No. 5
- Beat Haze Odyssey (October 18, 2000) No. 3
- Follow the Wind (August 20, 2003) No. 2
- In the Mood (December 20, 2006) No. 3
- "B"orderless (September 8, 2010) No. 3

=== Singles ===
- "Angel" (July 21, 1988), Oricon Weekly Singles Chart Peak Position: No. 1, Tokio Hot 100 1988 Year-End Position: 91
- "Dear Algernon" (October 7, 1988) No. 2
- "Summer Game" (July 26, 1989) No. 1
- "Misty ~Bimyōni~" (MISTY〜微妙に〜; September 6, 1989) No. 2
- "Jealousy o Nemura Sete" (JEALOUSYを眠らせて; May 16, 1990) No. 1
- "Crime of Love" (February 27, 1991) No. 2
- "Urban Dance" (February 26, 1992) No. 2
- "Good Luck My Love" (November 7, 1992) No. 5
- "Kiss Me" (December 7, 1992) No. 1
- "Virgin Beat" (August 29, 1994) No. 1
- "Tamashī wo Daitekure" (魂を抱いてくれ; lit. "Hug the Soul", October 25, 1995) No. 2
- "Stay" (June 24, 1996) No. 1
- "Squall" (August 15, 1996) No. 1
- "Waltz" (January 15, 1997) No. 4
- "Native Stranger" (June 4, 1997) No. 2
- "Heat" (October 29, 1997) No. 5
- "Sleepless Night ~Nemurenai Yoru no Tame ni~" (SLEEPLESS NIGHT 〜眠れない夜のために〜; August 18, 1999) No. 6
- "Diamond Dust" (ダイヤモンド・ダスト; October 27, 1999) No. 3
- "Eien ~Eternity~" (永遠 〜Eternity〜; February 23, 2000) No. 13
- "Honō no Kaseki" (炎の化石; June 28, 2000) No. 81
- "Girls Be Glamorous" (January 1, 2001) No. 10
- "Claudia" (July 20, 2003) No. 10
- "Wild Romance" (September 8, 2004) No. 6
- "Easy Love/Bitch as Witch" (February 8, 2006) No. 6
- "Answer" (August 2, 2006)

Glay feat. Kyosuke Himuro

- "Sweet Revolution/In the Nude ~Even Not in the Mood~" (October 4, 2006) No. 3
- "Safe and Sound" (April 29, 2009) (feat. Gerard Way)
- "Bang the Beat/Safe and Sound" (July 14, 2010) No. 3
- "If You Want" (March 14, 2012) No. 4
- "Warriors" (September 26, 2012) No. 5
- "North of Eden" (May 1, 2013) No. 6
- "One Life" (July 16, 2014) No. 6

=== Compilations ===
- Singles (July 19, 1995) No. 1
- Collective Souls ~The Best of Best~ (June 24, 1998) No. 4
- Ballad ~ La Pluie (September 27, 2001) No. 7
- Case of Himuro (March 19, 2003) No. 7
- 20th Anniversary All Singles Complete Best "Just Movin' On" ~All The-S-Hit~ (June 11, 2008) No. 1
- Kyosuke Himuro 25th Anniversary Best Album Greatest Anthology (August 21, 2013) No. 1
- L'épilogue (April 13, 2016) No. 1

=== Live albums ===
- The One Night Stands ~Tour "Collective Souls" 1998~ (December 9, 1998) No. 6
- 21st Century Boøwys Vs Himuro (December 24, 2004) No. 8

=== Others ===
- Lover's Day Double Happiness (August 21, 1991)
- Masterpiece #12 (April 25, 1992) No. 1
- Lover's Day II (January 27, 1999)
- Final Fantasy VII Advent Children Original Soundtrack (September 28, 2005)
- Tour 2010-11 Borderless "50x50 Rock 'N' Roll Suicide" -Official Pirates Mix 20101231--Official Pirates Mix 20101230- (February 7, 2011)
- Official Pirates Mix (February 3, 2012)
- Crossover 12-13 Day 1 20121230 (January 15, 2013)
- Crossover 12-13 Day 2 20121231 (January 15, 2013)

=== Home videos ===
- King of Rock Show of 88's-89's Turning Process (June 28, 1989 / DVD 2009), Oricon DVDs Chart Peak Position: No. 20
- Neo Fascio Turning Point (July 25, 1990 / DVD 2009) No. 26
- Birth of Lovers (December 1990)
- Over Soul Matrix (November 27, 1991 / DVD 2009) No. 30
- Captured Clips (April 28, 1993)
- Live at the Tokyo Dome Shake the Fake Tour (December 25, 1995 / DVD 2009) No. 23
- Missing Piece (May 14, 1997)
- The One Night Stands - Tour "Collective Souls" 1998 (December 24, 1998 / DVD 2009) No. 18
- 100152 (December 24, 1999 / DVD 2000) No. 14
- Digital BeatNix Tower (October 18, 2000) No. 2
- Case of Himuro 15th Anniversary Special Live (November 25, 2003) No. 10
- Higher Than Heaven ~ At Yoyogi National Stadium" (August 18, 2004) No. 5
- 21st Century Boøwys Vs Himuro (December 24, 2004)
- Soul Standing By〜 (2005)
- Kyosuke Himuro/Captured Clips 1988-2006 (2006) No. 8
- Kyosuke Himuro Tour 2007 "In the Mood" (2008) No. 2
- 20th Anniversary Tour 2008 Just Movin' On -Moral~Present- (2009) No. 3
- L’egoiste (2009) No. 8
- Kyosuke Himuro Countdown Live Crossover 05-06 1st Stage/2nd Stage (2009) No. 7
- 20th Anniversary Tour 2008 Just Movin' On -Moral~Present- Special Live at Budokan (2009)
- Great East Japan Earthquake Reconstruction Charity Live Kyosuke Himuro Gig at Tokyo Dome "We Are Down But Never Give Up!!" (東日本大震災復興支援チャリティライブ KYOSUKE HIMURO GIG at TOKYO DOME "We Are Down But Never Give Up!!"; 2011) No. 2
- Kyosuke Himuro Tour 2010-11 Borderless 50x50 Rock' N' Roll Suicide (2012) No. 6
- 21st Century Boøwys Vs Himuro "An Attempt to Discover New Truths" (2012) No. 8
- Special Gigs The Borderless From Boøwy to Himuro (2012)
- Kyosuke Himuro Tour 2010-11 Borderless 50×50 Rock 'N' Roll Suicide (2012)
- Kyosuke Himuro 25th Anniversary Tour Greatest Anthology -Naked- Final Destination Day-01 (2015)
- Kyosuke Himuro Last Gigs (2017)

== See also ==
- List of best-selling music artists in Japan
