= Bolingo (Love Is in the Air) =

Single by La Bouche

from the album S.O.S.
- Released: October 14, 1996
- Genre: Eurodance
- Length: 3:51
- Label: BMG; Drohm; MCI; Scorpio Music
- Songwriters: Billy Alingabo; G. Mart; James Walls; Mandy Lee
- Producer: Farian Music Production

La Bouche singles chronology
"I Love to Love" (1995)	"Bolingo (Love Is in the Air)" (1996)	"You Won't Forget Me" (1997)

Music video
- "Bolingo (Love Is in the Air)" on YouTube

"Bolingo (Love Is in the Air)" is a song recorded by German Eurodance group La Bouche, released in October 1996 by various labels as a single. It was produced by Farian Music Production and achieved moderate success on the charts in Europe, becoming a top-20 hit in Austria, Denmark, Finland and Switzerland. On the Eurochart Hot 100, the song reached number 47 in December 1996 after three weeks on the chart. The accompanying music video was shot in Ibiza, Spain.

== Critical reception ==
In his review of the group's second American album release, S.O.S., Chuck Campbell from Knoxville News Sentinel felt that the duo "have sporadic fun with their silliness", "sliding in a little Latin funk on the otherwise fuzzy 'Bolingo'."

== Track listing ==
- 12" single, France
1. "Bolingo (Love Is in the Air)" (Club Mix) — 8:00
2. "Bolingo (Love Is in the Air)" (Radio Mix) — 4:28
3. "Bolingo (Love Is in the Air)" (Dub Mix) — 4:40
- CD single, France
1. "Bolingo (Love Is in the Air)" (Radio Edit) — 3:51
2. "Bolingo (Love Is in the Air)" (Radio Mix) — 4:30
- CD maxi, Europe
1. "Bolingo (Love Is in the Air)" (Radio Mix) — 4:28
2. "Bolingo (Love Is in the Air)" (Club Mix) — 8:00
3. "Bolingo (Love Is in the Air)" (Dub Mix) — 4:40
4. "Megamix" ("Sweet Dreams"/"Fallin' in Love"/"Be My Lover"/"I Love to Love") — 3:43
- CD maxi, France
1. "Bolingo (Love Is in the Air)" (Radio Edit) — 3:51
2. "Bolingo (Love Is in the Air)" (Club Mix) — 8:00
3. "Bolingo (Love Is in the Air)" (Dub Mix) — 4:40

== Charts ==
=== Weekly charts ===
Chart (1996)	Peak position
Austria (Ö3 Austria Top 40)	19
Denmark (IFPI)	19
Europe (Eurochart Hot 100)	47
Europe (European Dance Radio)	20
Finland (Suomen virallinen lista)	15
France Airplay (SNEP)	96
Germany (GfK)	26
Sweden (Sverigetopplistan)	23
Switzerland (Schweizer Hitparade)	15

=== Year-end charts ===
Chart (1997)	Position
Romania (Romanian Top 100)	42
