= Sweet Dreams (La Bouche album) =

Studio album by La Bouche
- Released: 12 June 1995
- Recorded: 1994–1995
- Genre: Eurodance; dance-pop
- Length: 55:16
- Label: MCI
- Producer: FMP (Frank Farian)

La Bouche chronology
Sweet Dreams (1995)	A Moment of Love (1997)

Singles from Sweet Dreams
- 1. "Sweet Dreams" Released: 13 April 1994; 2. "Be My Lover" Released: 2 March 1995; 3. "Fallin' in Love" Released: 12 June 1995; 4. "I Love to Love" Released: 27 November 1995

Sweet Dreams is the debut studio album by German Eurodance duo La Bouche. It was released on 12 June 1995 through MCI Records. Produced by Frank Farian under the pseudonym FMP, it spawned four singles: "Sweet Dreams", "Be My Lover", "Fallin' in Love" and "I Love to Love". The album was very successful all over the world, reaching number two in Finland and Switzerland, and number three in Germany. It was certified Platinum in Australia, New Zealand and the United States, and Gold in Canada, Finland, Germany, Hong Kong, Japan, Poland and Switzerland.

== Critical reception ==
Professional ratings
Review scores
Source	Rating
AllMusic	4/5 stars
Robert Christgau	(2-star Honorable Mention)
The Encyclopedia of Popular Music	4/5 stars
Entertainment Weekly	B
The Indianapolis Star	2.5/4 stars
Knoxville News Sentinel	2/5 stars
Los Angeles Times	1/4 stars

J.D. Considine from The Baltimore Sun complimented Thornton's voice, as a classic soul singer, "blessed with power, tone and an impressive interpretive ability". Gil L. Robertson IV from Cash Box wrote, "Their vocal delivery is crisp, fresh and full of personality that should provide them with a winning edge in the highly competitive world of dance/R&B." He highlighted "Sweet Dreams", "Nice 'N' Slow", "Do You Still Need Me" and "Be My Lover". Chuck Eddy from Entertainment Weekly found that "their electro-boogie keyboards, chesty diva choruses, and bellowed raps are irksomely interchangeable with any old C+C Music Factory hit: the sound of house music spinning its wheels."

Lynn Dean Ford from The Indianapolis Star said the "real treats" on the album include a remake of Hamilton, Joe Frank & Reynolds' 1975 hit "Fallin' in Love", "which La Bouche turns into an engaging R&B shuffle; "Do You Still Need Me", a ballad with an understated country feel; and "Shoo Bee Do Bee Do (I Like That Way)", a jaunty, hook- filled, midtempo ditty with a jangly rhythm guitar. Through it all, Thornton emerges as a talented vocalist who probably would jam harder on meatier material." Chuck Campbell from Knoxville News Sentinel stated that the duo "manages some functional rhythms similar to "Be My Lover" on the title track and "I Love to Love"." He felt that La Bouche "pours dance-conscious heart" into "Fallin' in Love", "plus "Nice 'N' Slow" is an agreeable slap-and-stomp number. However, Thornton and McCray stray disastrously from standard dance formula with the swaggering country-esque "Do You Still Need Me" and the mid-tempo "I'll Be There".

== Track listing ==
Adapted from album booklet.

Sweet Dreams track listing
No.	Title	Writer(s)	Producer(s)	Length
1.	"Forget Me Nots"	Freddie Washington; Patrice Rushen; Terry McFadden	FMP	4:10
2.	"Sweet Dreams"	Melanie Thornton; Gerd Amir Saraf; Robert Haynes; Mehmet Sönmez	Andy Brenner; Saraf; FMP	3:23
3.	"Be My Lover"	Thornton; Brenner; Saraf; Lane McCray	Brenner; Saraf; FMP	3:58
4.	"Fallin' in Love"	Dan Hamilton; Ann Hamilton	FMP	3:55
5.	"I'll Be There"	Felix Weber; Irmgard Klarmann	Brenner; Saraf; FMP	4:10
6.	"Nice 'N' Slow"	Thornton; McCray; Saraf; Brenner	Brenner; Saraf; FMP	3:58
7.	"Where Do You Go"	Peter Bischof-Fallenstein; FMP; James Walls	FMP	4:16
8.	"I Love to Love"	McCray; Saraf; Brenner	Saraf; Brenner	3:59
9.	"Do You Still Need Me"	Mary S. Applegate; FMP; Dietmar Kawohl	FMP	3:35
10.	"Poetry in Motion"	Applegate; FMP	FMP	3:40
11.	"Shoo Bee Do Bee Do (I Like That Way)"	Bischof-Fallenstein; FMP; Walls	FMP	3:58
12.	"The Heat Is On"	Bischof-Fallenstein; FMP	FMP	3:42
13.	"Mama Look (I Love Him)"	Bischof-Fallenstein; FMP; Walls	FMP	3:58
14.	"Be My Lover" (House Mix)	Thornton; Brenner; Saraf; McCray	Brenner; Saraf; FMP	3:56

1996 version
No.	Title	Length
1.	"Be My Lover"
2.	"Sweet Dreams"
3.	"Fallin' in Love"
4.	"Where Do You Go"
5.	"I'll Be There"
6.	"Do You Still Need Me"
7.	"I Love to Love"
8.	"The Heat Is On"
9.	"Poetry in Motion"
10.	"Shoo Bee Do Bee Do (I Like That Way)"
11.	"Nice 'N' Slow"
12.	"Fallin' in Love" (Spike Mix)
13.	"Be My Lover" (House Mix)
14.	"Tonight Is the Night"

== Charts ==
=== Weekly charts ===
Chart (1995)	Peak position
Australian Albums (ARIA)	10
Austrian Albums (Ö3 Austria)	9
Dutch Albums (Album Top 100)	41
Finnish Albums (Suomen virallinen lista)	2
German Albums (Offizielle Top 100)	3
Hungarian Albums (MAHASZ)	2
New Zealand Albums (RMNZ)	6
Norwegian Albums (VG-lista)	26
Swedish Albums (Sverigetopplistan)	29
Swiss Albums (Schweizer Hitparade)	2
US Billboard 200	28

=== Year-end charts ===
Chart (1995)	Position
German Albums (Official Top 100)	46

Chart (1996)	Position
Australian Albums (ARIA)	43
New Zealand Albums (RMNZ)	43
US Billboard 200	59

== Certifications ==
Region	Certification	Certified units/sales
Australia (ARIA)	Platinum	70,000^{^}
Canada (Music Canada)	Gold	50,000^{^}
Finland (Musiikkituottajat)	Gold	23,414
Germany (BVMI)	Gold	250,000^{^}
Hong Kong (IFPI Hong Kong)	Gold	10,000^{*}
Japan (RIAJ)	Gold	100,000^{^}
New Zealand (RMNZ)	Platinum	15,000^{^}
Poland (ZPAV)	Gold	50,000^{*}
Switzerland (IFPI Switzerland)	Gold	25,000^{^}
United States (RIAA)	Platinum	1,000,000^{^}
^{*} Sales figures based on certification alone.^{^} Shipments figures based on certification alone.

== Release history ==
Region	Date	Format	Label
Various	12 June 1995	CD; cassette	MCI
