= Cage (Akina Nakamori album) =

Studio album by Akina Nakamori
- Released: November 8, 2017
- Recorded: 2017
- Genres: J-pop; disco; Eurobeat
- Length: 36:02
- Languages: Japanese; English
- Label: Universal Music Japan
- Producers: Naoshi Fujikura; Don Flamingo

Akina Nakamori chronology
Akina (2017)	Cage (2017)

Cage (ケージ, Kēji) is the 10th covers album by Japanese entertainer Akina Nakamori, released on November 8, 2017 under Universal Music Japan.

== Background ==
Cage was released as a part of the 35th debut anniversary celebration and on the same day as the original album Akina.

The album was released in limited and regular editions. The limited edition includes a DVD containing 10 minutes of footage for Nakamori's 35th debut anniversary celebration.

After the album's release, Nakamori's music release activities were suspended without announcement during the time of release until 2023.

== Chart performance ==
Cage debuted at No. 8 on Oricon's albums chart and charted for six weeks. On the Billboard Japan album chart, the album debuted at No. 7.

== Track listing ==
All tracks arranged by Kengo Sasaki.

No.	Title	Writer(s)	Original artist	Length
1.	"Be My Lover"	Gerd Amir Saraf; Lane McCray; Melanie Thornton	La Bouche	4:09
2.	"Venus"	Robbie van Leeuwen; Hitoshi Shinohara	Yōko Nagayama (Note: Japanese version, based on Bananarama's cover of the song.)	3:32
3.	"Into the Night"	Michael De San Antonio; Pierre Michel Nigro; Mario Giuseppe Nigro; Shinohara	Michael Fortunati	3:54
4.	"Can't Take My Eyes Off You"	Bob Crewe; Bob Gaudio	Boys Town Gang	4:25
5.	"Give Me Up"	M. G Nigro; P. M. Nigro; M. De San Antonio; Yukinojo Mori	Michael Fortunati	3:49
6.	"Dancing Hero (Eat You Up)" ((ダンシング・ヒーロー (Eat You Up)))	Angelina Kyte; Anthony Baker; Shinohara	Yōko Oginome (Note: Japanese version of Angie Gold's "Eat You Up".)	3:49
7.	"Two of Hearts"	John Dixon Mitchell	Stacey Q	4:59
8.	"Sweet Dreams (Are Made of This)"	Dave Stewart; Annie Lennox	Eurythmics	3:50
9.	"Call Me"	Giorgio Moroder; Debbie Harry	Blondie	3:31
Total length:				36:02

== Release history ==
Year	Format(s)	Serial number	Label(s)	Ref.
2017	CD, CD+DVD	UPCH-2141, UPCH-7367	UMJ	
2023	CD	UPCY-7879	UMJ	
2024	LP	UPJY-9385	UMJ	
