= Akina =

Akina may refer to:

== People ==
- Akina (given name), with a list of people and characters
- Duane Akina (born 1956), American football coach
- Joseph Apukai Akina (1856–1920), lawyer, politician and minister of the Kingdom of Hawaii
- Yunsi (1680–1726; also Akina), Manchu prince of the Qing dynasty in China
- Akina (born 1999), member of Japanese girl group Faky

== Other uses ==
- Akina, New Zealand, suburb of Hastings City, in the Hawke's Bay Region of New Zealand's North Island
- Akina (Akina Nakamori album), a 2017 studio album
- Akina, a character in the 3D-CG Hong Kong donghua TV series Zentrix
- Mount Akina, name for Mount Haruna in the Initial D series of manga and anime
