= I Love to Love =

Single by La Bouche

from the album Sweet Dreams
- B-side: "Forget Me Nots"
- Released: November 27, 1995
- Recorded: 1994–1995
- Genre: Eurodance
- Length: 3:58
- Label: MCI; BMG
- Songwriters: Uli Brenner; Gerd Amir Saraf; Lane McCray
- Producers: Uli Brenner; Gerd Amir Saraf

La Bouche singles chronology
"Fallin' in Love" (1995)	"I Love to Love" (1995)	"Bolingo (Love is in the Air)" (1996)

Music video
- "I Love to Love" on YouTube

"I Love to Love" is a song recorded by German Eurodance group La Bouche, released in November 1995, by MCI and BMG, as the fourth and last single of their debut album, Sweet Dreams (1995). The song achieved a minor success in comparison with "Be My Lover" and "Sweet Dreams", but it became a number-one hit in Peru and a top-five hit in Hungary and El Salvador. In Canada, "I Love to Love" peaked at number two on the RPM Dance/Urban chart. The CD maxi's cover features also the title of the fourth track, a cover of Patrice Rushen's "Forget Me Nots", another song taken from the same album. "I Love to Love" earned a gold record in Australia, where it reached number six, with a sale of 35,000 singles. The accompanying music video was filmed in Berlin, Germany. Lynn Dean Ford from Indianapolis Star described "I Love to Love" as a "pounding dance tune" in the vein of Snap! and Real McCoy, noting that their "relentless energy [are] steeped in tension and computerization."

== Track listings ==
- CD single
1. "I Love to Love" (radio mix) — 3:58
2. "I Love to Love" (radio mix II) — 3:59
- CD maxi
1. "I Love to Love" (radio mix) — 3:58
2. "I Love to Love" (club mix) — 5:58
3. "I Love to Love" (Doug Laurent mix) — 5:41
4. "Forget Me Nots" (club mix) — 5:20
- 7" maxi

A1. "I Love to Love" (club mix) — 5:54
A2. "I Love to Love" (Doug Laurent mix) — 5:41
B1. "Forget Me Nots" — 6:05
B2. "I Love to Love" — 6:08

== Charts ==
=== Weekly charts ===
Chart (1995–1996)	Peak position
Australia (ARIA)	6
Austria (Ö3 Austria Top 40)	19
Belgium (Ultratop 50 Flanders)	21
Canada Dance/Urban (RPM)	2
El Salvador (UPI)	3
Europe (Eurochart Hot 100)	37
Europe (European Dance Radio)	6
Finland (Suomen virallinen lista)	18
France (SNEP)	27
Germany (GfK)	21
Hungary (Mahasz)	5
Netherlands (Dutch Top 40)	26
Netherlands (Single Top 100)	30
Peru (UPI)	1
Sweden (Sverigetopplistan)	42

=== Year-end charts ===
Chart (1996)	Position
Australia (ARIA)	51
Canada Dance/Urban (RPM)	11

== Certifications ==
Region	Certification	Certified units/sales
Australia (ARIA)	Gold	35,000^{^}
^{^} Shipments figures based on certification alone.
