= Melanie Thornton =

American singer (1967–2001)

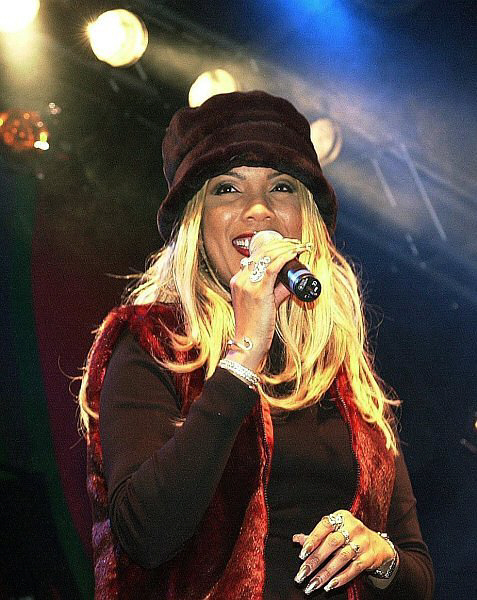
- Thornton during her final performance on November 24, 2001
- Born: Melanie Janene Thornton; May 13, 1967; Charleston, South Carolina, U.S.
- Died: November 24, 2001 (aged 34); Bassersdorf, Canton of Zurich, Switzerland
- Occupations: Singer; songwriter
- Years active: 1991–2001
- Spouse: Christian Thornton (m. 2000; div. 2001)
- Musical career
- Origin: Mount Pleasant, South Carolina, U.S.
- Genres: Eurodance, Dance pop, R&B
- Instrument: Vocals
- Labels: X-Cell Music, Sony Music, Epic
- Formerly of: La Bouche; Le Click

Melanie Janene Thornton (May 13, 1967 – November 24, 2001) was an American singer-songwriter. Born in Charleston, South Carolina, she first gained recognition as a session singer after relocating to Germany to pursue a music career. Her work attracted the attention of production team Ulli Brenner and Gerd Amir Saraf, who enlisted her vocals on the songs "Sweet Dreams" and "Tonight Is the Night". After being signed to MCI Records by German record producer Frank Farian, she formed a music duo called La Bouche with Lane McCray. The duo released their debut album Sweet Dreams in June 1995, which spawned the top-charting US Billboard Hot 100 singles "Sweet Dreams" and "Be My Lover". She departed from La Bouche after the release of their less-successful second album A Moment of Love (1997) to pursue a solo career, respectively.

After signing with Germany-based label X-Cell Records in 2000, she released her debut solo album Ready to Fly in May 2001. The album peaked in the top-five in Germany and Switzerland and earned gold-certifications in both countries. Shortly after, she embarked on the Christmas Coca-Cola Tour to promote her album.

On November 24, 2001, at the age of 34, Melanie Thornton was killed in a plane crash along with twenty-three other people on board, when the aircraft she was traveling in crashed in range of hills where it caught fire near Bassersdorf, around 4 kilometres (2.5 mi) short of the runway. The pilot had attempted a controlled flight into terrain after navigation mistakes led the plane off-course. After her death, Melanie Thornton's music continued to achieve commercial success, aided by several posthumous releases, including the compilation albums Best of La Bouche feat. Melanie Thornton and Memories - Her Most Beautiful Ballads. Her final single "Wonderful Dream (Holidays Are Coming)" peaked in the top-five of several European countries and was certified double-platinum in Germany. She has sold over 13 million records worldwide.

== Early life ==
Melanie Janene Thornton was born in Charleston, South Carolina, on May 13, 1967. Her mother, Ida Mae Delores Thornton (née Grimball), was a seamstress and school teacher, while her father, Julius Caesar Thornton, was a businessman and owner of J.C. Thornton Excavating. Julius is of Cherokee and Portuguese ancestry. Melanie Thornton's elder sister Lois Chisolm is an educator and former entertainment manager.

Melanie was raised Methodist, attending Friendship A.M.E. Church in Charleston. At a young age, she was enrolled in dance and piano classes. She attended several elementary schools as a child, including Mount Pleasant Academy, Mamie P. Whitesides Elementary, and Laing Middle School. By the age of eleven, she began taking voice lessons. She later enrolled in Wando High School.

In 1985, she attended Fort Valley State University in Fort Valley, Georgia. During this time, she began performing with a wedding band called Danger Zone. While she was primarily a background singer in the band, she occasionally sang lead during a few of the band's performances. As Danger Zone only performed during certain periods of the year, she worked as a cashier to provide income for herself. Her elder sister Lois, who was briefly visiting her family in the United States, convinced her to travel to Germany to further her music career. Lois's husband Todd Chisolm had an uncle (known as Uncle Bob) who was an established musician and was willing to help Thornton with her music career. Before traveling to Germany, she briefly visited her family members in New York who arranged for her to perform at the Apollo Theater's amateur night.

== Career ==
=== 1992–1994: Career beginnings ===
To pursue her music career, Thornton traveled to Germany in February 1991 and lived with her sister. She began working with Uncle Bob and performing in local nightclubs. She briefly acquired a job singing at Old Joy's Pub, a piano bar in Marbella, Spain. She formed a R&B band called Groovin' Affairs, with whom she began performing locally in various parts of Germany. During her tenure in the group, she also became a session singer. In 1993, she worked with Men Behind, a eurodance group composed of music producers Peter Aleksander, Karsten Brand, and Jörg Dewald. The group released two singles "Feel the Life" (1993) and "How Can I" (1994).

By November 1993, Thornton was a in-demand session singer, providing vocals for several eurodance music producers. She was doing studio session work for several production companies including Click Productions, with whom she recorded two demo songs with. One of the demo songs "Sweet Dreams" was sent to music producer Frank Farian and the remaining song "Tonight Is the Night" was released on Logic Records under the group name Le Click. Upon receiving the song "Sweet Dreams", Farian asked Thornton if she knew of a male rapper to join her on the song. Robert Haynes, an American music producer and songwriter, performed the rap verse on "Sweet Dreams". After the song rose to popularity in Italy, Farian requested that Haynes join Thornton as a male/female duo. Haynes had declined as he only desired to be a music producer and songwriter. After she brought in Lane McCray whom she worked with in Groovin' Affairs, the duo was signed to Farian's music label MCI Records as La Bouche. The name stemmed from their music producers watching Melanie sing in studio sessions and noticing that her mouth was really big when she was singing. One of the producers thought of "la bouche", which means "the mouth" in French.

In September 1994, she featured on a single called "Power of the Light" by a group called 100%, formed by Ramin Nagachian and Rachid Nouri. Her session work and previous music releases attracted the attention of Cyborg music producers Frank Schlingloff and Oliver Reinecke. Schlingloff and Reinecke formed a short-lived group called Comic with Thornton and another music producer Giora Schein. Comic released one single "I Surrender to Your Love" on Cologne Dance Label in October 1994. In the same year, she also performed the vocals for Trance-Vision's single "Take Me 2 Heaven 2 Nite".

=== 1994–1999: La Bouche ===
After the release of their debut single "Sweet Dreams" in April 1994, the song became their first major hit, peaking in the top ten in various countries. After a successful concert tour in Italy, Frank Farian originally wanted to sign Thornton as a solo artist but she declined and convinced him to continue the La Bouche project with Lane McCray. Attempting to force her decision as a solo artist, Farian mandated that Thornton would have to split her royalties from "Sweet Dreams" with McCray. "Be My Lover", the duo's second single released in February 1995, became an international success and sold over six million copies worldwide. It also peaked at number one in several European countries and peaked in the top ten on the US Billboard Hot 100. The song preceded their debut studio album, Sweet Dreams, which was released on 12 June 1995. The album is a mixture of Eurodance and R&B, and its production was overseen by Frank Farian. Sweet Dreams peaked at number twenty-eight on the Billboard 200 and number three on the German Albums chart. La Bouche headlined their own concert tour which also featured their former group Groovin' Affairs as part of their shows.

Their success continued with the release of the singles "Fallin' in Love" and "I Love to Love"; the latter of which earned a certified gold record by Australian Recording Industry Association (ARIA). By September 1996, the album Sweet Dreams had sold millions of copies worldwide. In December 1996, they issued a remix album titled All Mixed Up, which also included "Tonight Is the Night"; which had been released under Le Click with Thornton's vocals.

In November 1997, La Bouche released their second album A Moment of Love, which featured a lighter sound than the standard Eurodance sound in attempt to appeal more to the American market. Despite this, the album was not considered a commercial success. While the album's lead single, "You Won't Forget Me", managed to chart within the top thirty of a few countries, it was ultimately considered a minor success when the song failed to rise to the level of "Sweet Dreams" and "Be My Lover". The album's follow-up singles "A Moment of Love" and "S.O.S." failed to chart when tensions between Frank Farian and record company BMG began to surface. BMG withdrew their financial marketing of the album A Moment of Love. In February 2000, Thornton left La Bouche after feeling creatively limited and controlled by Frank Farian.

=== 2000–2001: Ready to Fly ===
Managed by her elder sister Lois Chisolm, Thornton signed a solo record deal with X-Cell Records and Epic Records in mid-2000. In October 2000, Melanie released "Love How You Love Me", the lead single from her debut solo studio album, Ready to Fly. The song peaked in the top twenty in Germany. On May 7, 2001, she released her first album Ready to Fly on X-Cell Records. Released exclusively in Europe and featuring a sound different from La Bouche, the album peaked at number 5 in Germany. The singles "Heartbeat" and "Makin' Oooh Oooh (Talking About Love)" were moderate successes on the charts.

On November 26, 2001, the album was reissued with a new song "Wonderful Dream (Holidays Are Coming)" and several remixed songs. "Wonderful Dream (Holidays Are Coming)" became her highest-charting solo single, peaking in the top five of several European countries. The song was also featured in a Coca-Cola Christmas promotional campaign. In November 2001, she embarked on the Christmas Coca-Cola Tour.

== Death ==
On November 24, 2001, Melanie Thornton and several musicians boarded Crossair Flight 3597 aircraft at the Berlin Tegel Airport in Berlin, Germany, to travel to Zurich Airport in Switzerland after she completed a concert performance in Leipzig as part of the Christmas Coca-Cola Tour. The plane crashed into a wooded range of hills where it caught fire near the small town of Bassersdorf, around 4 kilometres (2.5 mi) short of the runway. Thornton and twenty-three others on board—including Nathaly van het Ende and Maria Serrano Serrano of the eurodance group Passion Fruit—were killed. At the time of her death, she was survived by her mother Ida Mae, sister Lois, niece, and nephews.

As the subsequent investigation by the Swiss Aircraft Accident Investigation Bureau (AAIB) determined, the accident was a controlled flight into terrain (CFIT) caused by a series of pilot errors and navigation mistakes that led the plane off-course. This course deviation caused the plane to crash north of its assigned landing strip, runway 28.

While visiting his family for Thanksgiving in the United States, former La Bouche music partner Lane McCray received news of her death from a phone call with Crystal Waters. George Glueck, head of Berlin-based record company X-cell Records, released a statement that read, "Melanie's death is a shock for all of us. We have lost more than just a great artist. The many years of working together made her a real friend."

=== Funeral ===
A memorial service for Thornton was held at the Kaiser Wilhelm Memorial Church in Berlin on November 30, where German singer Sarah Connor sang "Love How You Love Me". Following the memorial service, Thornton's family arranged for her to be transported to South Carolina for burial. Her funeral was held at Fielding Funeral Home's chapel in Charleston, South Carolina, on December 8, 2001. Former La Bouche music partner Lane McCray did not attend the memorial service or funeral as he felt his presence could be seen as a disruption, in addition to the undisclosed legal litigation against Thornton's sister Lois Chisholm. Thornton was buried at Mount Pleasant Memorial Gardens, in Mount Pleasant, Charleston County, South Carolina.

As Thornton left no will, the heir of her sole estate was her mother Ida Mae Delores Thornton. She appointed Todd Chisolm (the husband of her eldest daughter Lois Chisolm) as the executor of Thornton's estate and the family filed court documents to open a probate case, stating that no will had been found. An injunction was later filed by Thornton's ex-husband Christian Thornton. After three years of litigation, Christian Thornton was granted Melanie's estate and overturn of their divorce.

=== Posthumous releases ===
Coca-Cola aired the commercial featuring Thornton's "Wonderful Dream (Holidays Are Coming)" as planned. While the original commercial has aired in Germany every year since 2001 around Christmas time, the song has been in the German single charts every year since. In May 2002, Frank Farian released a compilation album titled Best of La Bouche feat. Melanie Thornton. On November 25, 2002, La Bouche release the single "In Your Life" with Thornton's vocals to commemorate the first anniversary of her death. A music video featuring La Bouche member Lane McCray watching clips of Thornton was also released. On December 1, 2003, a remix compilation titled Memories – Her Most Beautiful Ballads was released containing songs in acoustic ballad versions on X-Cell Records. On April 2, 2007, a second La Bouche compilation titled Greatest Hits was released. In October 2014, DJ Bobo released a studio video of him and Thornton recording the song "Love of My Life".

== Artistry ==
=== Voice ===
Melanie Thornton had the vocal range of a soprano, and with the release of La Bouche's debut single "Sweet Dreams", several media outlets and music critics compared her sound to eurodance group Snap!. However, Pan-European magazine Music & Media remarked that the added value of this "throbbing piece of Euro dance is Melanie Thornton's massive vocals, which definitely set the track apart from most of her competition." When reviewing the song "Be My Lover", Richmond Times-Dispatch's reviewer stated, "I am insanely jealous of the lead female vocal, Melanie Thornton. She has a wonderful, flexible voice." Juha Soininen, author of Move Your Body (2 The 90's), commented "Her voice could lift even the most mediocre songs to new heights."

=== Musical style and influences ===
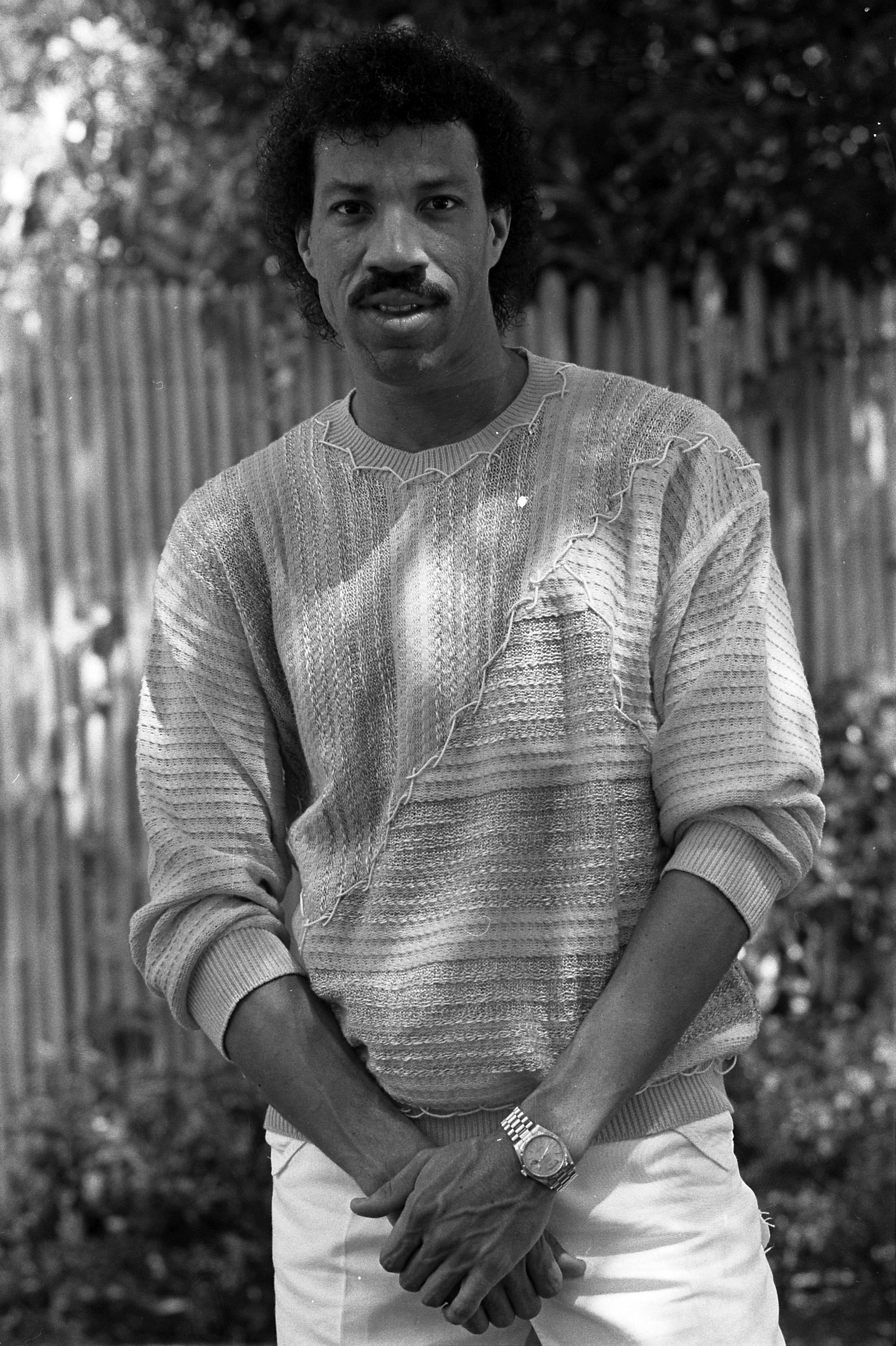
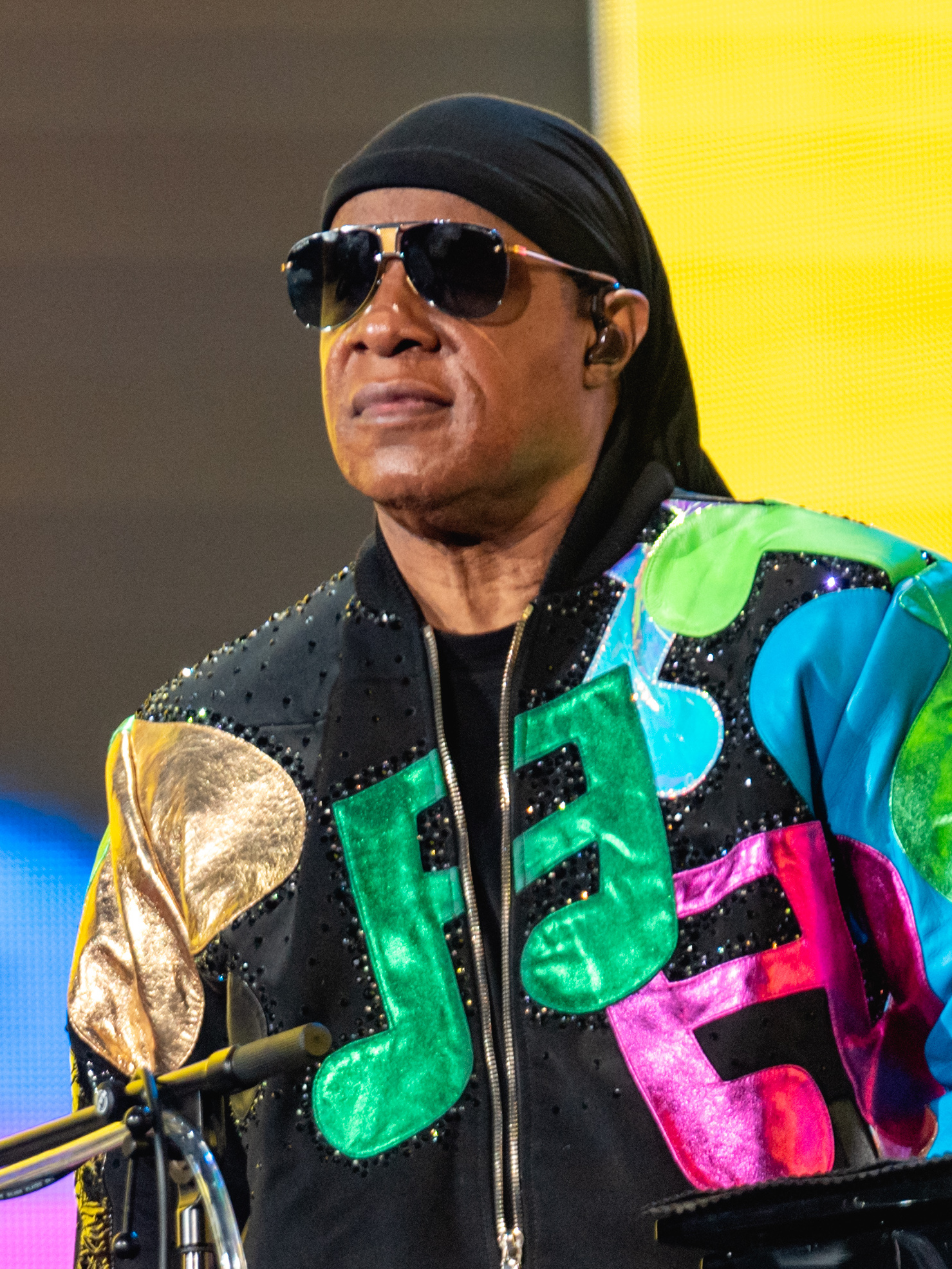
Lionel Richie (left) and Stevie Wonder (right), both influenced Melanie Thornton and her music.

Her influences included Lionel Richie, Aretha Franklin, Roberta Flack, James Brown, Stevie Wonder, Smokey Robinson, and Prince. Thornton's songwriting was specifically influenced by Lionel Richie, Smokey Robinson, and Stevie Wonder. The song "Be My Lover" was written as a call and response to fellow La Bouche member Lane McCray.

Thornton explored genre including eurodance, dance pop, house, and R&B. With Sweet Dreams, AllMusic's Stephen Thomas Erlewine wrote that the album was "tightly-constructed pseudo-disco songs with just enough pop flourishes to make their sound appealing to mainstream listeners." Author Juha Soininen noted that Thornton's solo album Ready to Fly was a departure from her sound with La Bouche into the R&B genre.

=== Image ===
Melanie Thornton's outfits were often designed and created by herself or her mother Ida Mae Delores Thornton. She would often refuse being styled by designer brands. Thornton was known for never repeating the same outfit twice.

== Personal life ==
Melanie Thornton began dating Christian Thornton, whom she met in October 1999. They married on January 15, 2000. The couple made a televised appearance on German TV show Love Stories. The couple divorced after fourteen months of marriage. According to Sweet Dreams Fulfilled, The Melanie Thornton Story, the divorce stemmed from Christian Thornton, who had been diagnosed with bipolar disorder, refusing to stay consistent with his medication, which would result in emotional and verbal outbursts. One specific verbal altercation took place on set of the music video for "Heartbeat", in which Christian appears in as Thornton's love interest. In addition, Christian Thornton spent much of his time at strip clubs and doing drugs to cope with his mental illness. Following their divorce, Thornton began dating a former professional football player named Tre.

== Legacy ==
Melanie Thornton sold over 13 million records during her career. Her song "Be My Lover" with La Bouche won an ASCAP award for the "Most Played Song in America", as well as an Echo Award for "Best National Dance Single" in 1996. In 2004, her sister Lois Chisolm founded a nonprofit organization called the Melanie Thornton Youth Arts Foundation, Inc. The organization provides classes, workshops, events, performances, out of school programs, summer programs, and exhibits in facilities in Atlanta, Georgia. In December 2012, Chisolm released a book called Sweet Dreams Fulfilled, The Melanie Thornton Story, which chronicles the life of Thornton. As of 2025, "Wonderful Dream (Holidays Are Coming)" has spent more than 150 weeks on the German Top 100 charts, becoming the fifth-longest entry on the chart in total.

== Discography ==
=== Studio albums ===
Title	Album details	Peak chart positions			Certifications
Title	Album details	AUT	GER	SWI	Certifications
Ready to Fly	Released: May 7, 2001; Label: X-Cell Records; Formats: CD, cassette	20	5	4	BVMI: Gold; IFPI: Gold
"—" denotes studio albums that did not chart.

=== Compilation albums ===
- 2002: Best of La Bouche feat. Melanie Thornton
- 2003: Memories - Her Most Beautiful Ballads

=== Singles ===
Year	Single	Peak chart positions			Certifications (sales thresholds)	Album
Year	Single	AUT	GER	SWI	Certifications (sales thresholds)	Album
2000	"Love How You Love Me"	48	15	29		Ready to Fly
2001	"Heartbeat"	—	59	95		Ready to Fly
2001	"Makin' Oooh Oooh (Talking About Love)"	—	76	90		Ready to Fly
2001	"Wonderful Dream (Holidays Are Coming)"	5	3	3	GER: 2× Platinum	Ready to Fly
2002	"In Your Life" (with La Bouche)	—	—	—		Best of La Bouche & Melanie Thornton
"—" denotes singles that did not chart.

=== Singles (as featured artist) ===
Year	Single	Peak chart positions			Album
Year	Single	AUT	GER	SWI	Album
1993	"Feel the Life" (Men Behind feat. Melanie Thornton)	—	—	—	Non-album single
1994	"If You Wanna Be (My Only)" (Orange Blue feat. Melanie Thornton)	—	—	—	Non-album single
1994	"I Surrender to Your Love" (Comic feat. Melanie Thornton)	—	—	—	Non-album single
1994	"Power of the Light" (100% feat. Melanie Thornton)	—	—	—	Non-album single
1994	"Take Me 2 Heaven 2 Nite" (Trance-Vision feat. Melanie Thornton)	—	—	—	Non-album single
1994	"How Can I" (Men Behind feat. Melanie Thornton)	—	—	—	Non-album single
1994	"Nobody" (Hysterie feat. Melanie Thornton)	—	—	—	Non-album single
1994	"Tonight Is the Night" (Le Click feat. Melanie Thornton)	—	—	—	Tonight Is the Night
1994	"Freedom (Free Your Mind)" (Joy-Lab feat. Melanie Thornton)	—	—	—	Non-album single
1995	"Skate with Me" (Loop feat. Katarina Witt, Melanie Thornton, Joan Faulkner & Linda Rocco)	—	—	—	Non-album single
"—" denotes singles that did not chart.

== Awards and nominations ==
Award	Year	Category	Work	Result	Ref.
MTV Europe Music Awards	1995	Best Dance Act	La Bouche	Nominated	
MTV Europe Music Awards	1995	Breakthrough Artist	La Bouche	Nominated	
Goldene Europa	1995	Best Duo/Group	La Bouche	Won	
MTV Video Music Awards	1996	Best Dance Video	"Be My Lover"	Nominated	
Echo Awards	1996	Best National Dance Single	"Be My Lover"	Won	
ASCAP Awards	1996	Most Played Song in America	"Be My Lover"	Won	

== Literature ==
- Lois Chisolm: Sweet Dreams Fulfilled: The Melanie Thornton Story. Lois Thornton Chisolm, 2012.
