= Fallin' in Love (Hamilton, Joe Frank & Reynolds song) =

1975 song written by Dan Hamilton

Single by Hamilton, Joe Frank & Reynolds

from the album Fallin' in Love
- B-side: "So Good at Lovin' You"
- Released: May 2, 1975
- Recorded: 1975
- Genre: Soft rock; rhythm & blues
- Length: 3:04 (LP version); 3:11 (7" version)
- Label: Playboy
- Songwriters: Dan Hamilton; Ann Hamilton
- Producer: Jim Price

Hamilton, Joe Frank & Reynolds singles chronology
"One Good Woman" (1972)	"Fallin' in Love" (1975)	"Winners and Losers" (1975)

"Fallin' In Love" is a song by American music trio Hamilton, Joe Frank & Reynolds. It was written by band member Dan Hamilton and featured on the trio's third studio album by the same name (1975).

== Chart performance ==
Released in mid-1975, the song became the group's second top-10 hit on the Billboard Hot 100 chart in the US (following 1971's "Don't Pull Your Love" which peaked at number four), and it was their only song to reach number one on this chart. It was also the only pop number-one hit for the Playboy Records label.

"Fallin' in Love" was also a number-one hit on the Billboard Easy Listening chart in the US for one week in 1975. In addition, the song reached number twenty-four on Billboard's Hot Soul Singles chart.

== Charts ==
=== Weekly charts ===
Chart (1975)	Peak position
Australia (Kent Music Report)	64
Canada Top Singles (RPM)	2
Canada Adult Contemporary (RPM)	1
UK Singles (OCC)	33
US Billboard Hot 100	1
US Easy Listening (Billboard)	1
US Hot Soul Singles (Billboard)	24
US Cash Box Top 100	1

=== Year-end charts ===
Chart (1975)	Rank
Canada Top Singles (RPM)	49
Canada Adult Contemporary (RPM)	20
US Billboard Hot 100	44
US Cash Box Top 100	32

== La Bouche version ==
"Fallin' in Love"

Single by La Bouche

from the album Sweet Dreams
- Released: June 12, 1995
- Genre: Dance-pop; soul
- Length: 3:56
- Label: MCI; BMG
- Songwriters: Dan Hamilton; Ann Marie Hamilton
- Producer: D. C. Montez

La Bouche singles chronology
"Be My Lover" (1995)	"Fallin' in Love" (1995)	"I Love to Love" (1995)

Music video
- "Fallin' in Love" on YouTube

"Fallin' in Love" was covered in 1995 by German Eurodance duo La Bouche. It was the third single of their debut album, Sweet Dreams (1995), and was released in June 1995 by MCI and BMG, although the song did not gain popularity in the United States until the following year following the success of the first two singles, "Be My Lover" and "Sweet Dreams". It was produced by D. C. Montez, and though it did well in several countries, it achieved a minor success in comparison with previous releases. "Fallin' in Love" reached number four in Finland and Hungary, and was a top-20 hit in Austria, Belgium, Germany, Iceland, the Netherlands, Sweden and Switzerland. On the Eurochart Hot 100, the single peaked at number 20. According to La Bouche, it was Frank Farian's idea to cover the song. Melanie Thornton told Billboard in July 1994, "It was Farian's idea to cover this particular song, Frank saw it as a good way to introduce us to the U.S. market."

=== Critical reception ===
John Bush from AllMusic described the song as "an R&B/house groover". J.D. Considine from The Baltimore Sun said, "Listen to Melanie Thornton work her way through the likes of "Fallin' In Love" or "Do You Still Need Me", and it's clear that she has the voice of a classic soul singer." Larry Flick from Billboard magazine wrote that the German duo gives the 1975 pop hit by Hamilton, Joe Frank & Reynolds "a springy pop/dance spin that will fit top 40 and crossover formats like a comfy glove. Front woman Melanie Thornton has an appropriately flashy delivery that shines atop the track's shuffling rhythms, while partner Lane McCray's rap interludes are pleasant—if not gratefully unobtrusive." He also stated that Thornton is "adding glass-shattering drama to its oh-so-slick arrangement of bright synths and chunky beats."

Dave Sholin from the Gavin Report felt that the two "make this new version sparkle. Already bolstered by a substantial amount of airplay, this production has everything in place to be hit number three for this twosome." Pan-European magazine Music & Media commented, "Have a "mouthful" of sultry soul the old-fashioned way. The beat and rap bridge are a sign of a modern product, while the intro to the Full Harmony Club Mix, a dialogue between the Hamilton couple, is even more sexy." A reviewer from Music Week gave the song a score of four out of five, adding, "Pop dance balladry from the self-styled Eurogroovers, whose hooky continental hit is also making its mark on the US club chart." James Hamilton from the Record Mirror Dance Update wrote that Thornton's "outstanding soulfully joyful wailing Mariah Carey-ish vocal performance" makes it "potentially a UK number one smash too now".

=== Chart performance ===
"Fallin' in Love" entered the top 10 in Finland and Hungary, peaking at number four in both countries. Additionally, it was a top-20 hit in Austria, Flanders, Germany, Iceland, the Netherlands, Sweden, and Switzerland, as well as on the Eurochart Hot 100, where it peaked at number 20 during its eighth week on the chart, in September 1995. Additionally, "Fallin' in Love" entered the top 30 in France and on the Irish Singles Chart. In the United Kingdom, it peaked at number 43 during its first week on the UK Singles Chart, on September 24, 1995, and was their last single to chart there. Outside Europe, the song peaked at number four on the Canadian RPM Dance chart and number 39 on the RPM 100 Hit Tracks chart, as well as number 33 and 39 in New Zealand and Australia, respectively.

In the United States, the single was released three times. First led by the original R&B mix, it peaked at number 11 on the Bubbling Under Hot 100 in July 1995. After the Hot 100 success of "Be My Lover" and "Sweet Dreams", it was then given a new set of club remixes in September 1996. However, as it was not accompanied by a commercial single, this time it was ineligible for the Hot 100. It did however peak at number 18 on Top 40/Mainstream chart. A second set of remixes were released a few months later, and the single once again entered the Bubbling Under chart, peaking at number 114 in March 1997.

=== Music video ===
A music video was filmed and produced by DoRo Film GmbH on 13th April 1995 to promote the single for the upcoming summer. It was filmed at the Biltmore Hotel in Miami, featuring the duo performing both inside and outside of a villa. In between, there is a storyline of a young couple falling in love and eventually getting married. "Fallin' in Love" was A-listed on German music television channel VIVA in August 1995. The following month, the video was A-listed on Dutch TMF and received active rotation on MTV Europe.

=== Track listings ===
- CD single
1. "Fallin' in Love" (radio version) — 3:30
2. "Fallin' in Love" (Full Harmony club mix) — 4:50
- CD maxi (June 12, 1995)
1. "Fallin' in Love" (radio version) — 3:30
2. "Fallin' in Love" (Full Harmony club mix) — 4:50
3. "Fallin' in Love" (Melody-La Bouche Chant. club mix) — 5:15
4. "Fallin' in Love" (The Wedding club mix) — 4:20
5. "Fallin' in Love" (Crazy Wedding club mix) — 4:40
6. "Fallin' in Love" (Franks House mix) — 5:52
7. "Fallin' in Love" (Spike house mix) — 5:22
8. "Fallin' in Love" (Fallin' in Dub) — 6:21
- 12-inch maxi
1. "Fallin' in Love" (Franks house mix) — 5:52
2. "Fallin' in Love" (The Wedding club mix) — 4:20
3. "Fallin' in Love" (Melody-La Bouche Chant. club mix) — 5:15
4. "Fallin' in Love" (Spike house mix) — 5:22

=== Charts ===
==== Weekly charts ====
Chart (1995–1996)	Peak position
Australia (ARIA)	39
Austria (Ö3 Austria Top 40)	13
Belgium (Ultratop 50 Flanders)	23
Belgium (Ultratop 50 Wallonia)	15
Canada Top Singles (RPM)	39
Canada Dance/Urban (RPM)	4
Europe (Eurochart Hot 100)	20
Europe (European Dance Radio)	2
Europe (European Hit Radio)	6
Finland (Suomen virallinen lista)	4
France (SNEP)	24
Germany (GfK)	13
Hungary (Mahasz)	4
Iceland (Íslenski Listinn Topp 40)	20
Ireland (IRMA)	27
Italy Airplay (Music & Media)	10
Netherlands (Dutch Top 40)	14
Netherlands (Single Top 100)	15
New Zealand (Recorded Music NZ)	33
Quebec (ADISQ)	36
Scottish Singles Sales (Official Charts)	41
Sweden (Sverigetopplistan)	19
Switzerland (Schweizer Hitparade)	13
UK Singles (Official Charts)	43
US Dance Club Play (Billboard)	3
US Maxi-Singles Sales (Billboard)	11
US Top 40/Mainstream (Billboard)	18
US Top 40/Rhythm-Crossover (Billboard)	34

==== Year-end charts ====
Chart (1995)	Position
Belgium (Ultratop 50 Wallonia)	99
Europe (Eurochart Hot 100)	70
Europe (European Dance Radio)	4
France (SNEP)	79
Germany (Media Control)	57
Netherlands (Dutch Top 40)	128
Switzerland (Schweizer Hitparade)	36
US Dance Club Play (Billboard)	47

Chart (1996)	Position
US Top 40/Mainstream (Billboard)	92

=== Release history ===
Region	Date	Format(s)	Label(s)	Ref.
Europe	June 12, 1995	CD	MCI; BMG	
United Kingdom	September 18, 1995	CD; cassette	Arista	
Japan	January 24, 1996	CD	MCI	
United States	September 24, 1996	Rhythmic contemporary; contemporary hit radio (1996 mixes)	RCA	

== Funk'e Ray version ==
"Fallin' in Love" was also released in 1995 by US rapper Funk'e Ray as a maxi-single by Pandisc Records in Miami, Florida. This single version was written by Ray Hatcher and produced by Hatcher and Richard Finch from KC and the Sunshine Band.

== 2010 Copyright-infringement litigation ==
In a lawsuit that its attorneys filed June 24, 2010, Playboy Enterprises litigated against Drake for copyright infringement by over allegations that his hit song, "Best I Ever Had," sampled "Fallin' in Love" without attribution or permission. The suit named Drake, as well as Cash Money Records and Universal Music Group, as respondents, and it asserted that Playboy "has suffered, and will continue to suffer irreparable injury" from the alleged infringement. The lawsuit demanded that "all infringing works be recalled and destroyed."

As part of its claim, Playboy also alleged that "each defendant either knew, or should have reasonably known, that the sound recording was protected by copyright."

== Popular culture ==
- The song was featured in the 2007 film The Hitcher.

== See also ==
- List of Billboard Hot 100 number ones of 1975
