= Wanna be my lover =

"Wanna be my lover" is a song lyric that may refer to:

== Songs ==
- Be My Lover (La Bouche song)
- Wannabe (song), Spice Girls
