= You Won't Forget Me (song) =

Single by La Bouche

from the album A Moment of Love
- Released: 29 September 1997
- Genre: Eurodance
- Length: 4:16
- Label: MCI
- Songwriters: Franz Reuther; Peter Bischof-Fallenstein; Lane McCray

La Bouche singles chronology
"Bolingo (Love Is in the Air)" (1996)	"You Won't Forget Me" (1997)	"A Moment of Love" (1998)

Music video
- "You Won't Forget Me" on YouTube

"You Won't Forget Me" is a song recorded by German Eurodance group La Bouche, released on 29 September 1997, by MCI Records, as the lead single from their second album, A Moment of Love (1997) in most of the world, and second single from S.O.S., the US version of the album. It is co-written by group member Lane McCray with Franz Reuther and Peter Bischof-Fallenstein, and achieved a minor success in comparison with their 1995 hit, "Be My Lover". The song became a top-20 hit in Finland, and a top-30 hit in number 24 in France, Germany and Sweden. On the Eurochart Hot 100, it reached number 70. In the US, the song peaked at number 48 on the Billboard Hot 100, and was also their last single on that chart. The accompanying music video was filmed in New York City.

== Critical reception ==
Doug Hamilton from The Atlanta Constitution stated that the song "lives up to its name --- it's a sassy bit of sexual bravado set to a percolating beat. Alas, the title track isn't a cover of the Abba classic, but, incredibly, it's almost as catchy. (Dig McCray's sly chant "dit-dit-dit, dash-dash-dash, dit-dit-dit".)" Larry Flick from Billboard magazine noted that the song has a "fast-paced beat, bombastic vocals, candy-coated instrumentation, and a la-la-la chorus." He added that "several consecutive spins allow the song to eventually-and permanently-stick to the brain."

William Stevenson from Entertainment Weekly said that "the insistent beat, heavy bass line, and oft-reprised refrain should haunt club kids all summer." Another EW editor, David Browne, wrote, "The song is like a tank storming the sand dunes of your head. Its pumping, rock-this-party chorus—Wherever you’re going, wherever you'll be/ You won't forget me—is both a threat and a promise, and the single delivers on both."

== Music video ==
The music video for "You Won't Forget Me" was directed by Andras Mahr & B. Falls. It was shot in the autumn of 1997 in New York City, depicting the duo performing the song on a stage in front of a dancing crowd. The video was later published on La Bouche's official YouTube channel in August 2015, and had generated more than 22 million views as of early 2026.

== Track listings ==
- CD single, Australia (1997)
1. "You Won't Forget Me" (Radio Version) — 4:16
2. "You Won't Forget Me" (Cobra Club Mix) — 5:10
3. "You Won't Forget Me" (Extended Version) — 5:20
4. "You Won't Forget Me" (Spike Club Mix) — 6:50
5. "You Won't Forget Me" (House Mix) — 4:20
6. "You Won't Forget Me" (Manumission Mix) — 5:07
- CD single, Germany (1997)
1. "You Won't Forget Me" (Radio Version)
2. "You Won't Forget Me" (Cobra Club Mix)
- CD maxi-single, Europe (1997)
1. "You Won't Forget Me" (Radio Version) — 4:16
2. "You Won't Forget Me" (Cobra Club Mix) — 5:10
3. "You Won't Forget Me" (Extended Version) — 5:20
4. "You Won't Forget Me" (Spike Club Mix) — 6:50
5. "You Won't Forget Me" (House Mix) — 4:20
6. "You Won't Forget Me" (Manumission Mix) — 5:07

== Charts ==
Weekly chart performance for "You Won't Forget Me"
Chart (1997–1998)	Peak position
Australia (ARIA)	80
Croatia (HRT)	9
Europe (Eurochart Hot 100)	70
Finland (Suomen virallinen lista)	18
France (SNEP)	28
Germany (Media Control)	29
Sweden (Topplistan)	24
US Billboard Hot 100	48
