= No Tears =

No Tears may refer to:

- No Tears (TV serial), a 2002 Irish docudrama miniseries aired on RTÉ One
- No Tears (EP), by Tuxedomoon, or the title song, "No Tears (For the Creatures of the Night)", 1978
- "No Tears", a song by Arild Andersen from Shimri, 1977
- "No Tears", a song by Gamma from Gamma 1, 1979
- "No Tears", a song by James Blunt from Some Kind of Trouble, 2010
- "No Tears", a song by Jeezy from Seen It All: The Autobiography, 2014
- "No Tears", a song by Melanie Thornton from Ready to Fly, 2001
- "No Tears", a song by Nas from Magic 3, 2023
- "No Tears", a song by The Psychedelic Furs from Talk Talk Talk, 1981
- "No Tears", a song by Red Holloway from Cookin' Together, 1964
- "No Tears", a song by Red Red Groove from The Cyberflesh Conspiracy, 1992
- "No Tears", a song by Scarface from The Diary, 1994
