= Hallway Symphony =

Studio album by Hamilton, Joe Frank & Reynolds
- Released: January 1972
- Genre: Soft rock
- Label: Dunhill
- Producer: Steve Barri

Hamilton, Joe Frank & Reynolds chronology
Hamilton, Joe Frank & Reynolds (1971)	Hallway Symphony (1972)	Fallin' in Love (1975)

Hallway Symphony is the second studio album by the band Hamilton, Joe Frank & Reynolds, released in 1972. It was their final album for the Dunhill label.

Cover versions include "Bridge over Troubled Water", "You've Got a Friend", and "C'est la Vie" (originally recorded by Gayle McCormick). A single released from the album, "One Good Woman," failed to break the Top 40.

That same year, Tommy Reynolds quit the group; different session musicians took his place in their touring and recording before Alan Dennison replaced him permanently a year later (but the band kept their original name of "Hamilton, Joe Frank & Reynolds"). In 1973, the band was dropped from Dunhill due to lack of chart success, but they continued touring and performing live in Las Vegas and various colleges, thanks to the continuing radio play of their huge hit "Don't Pull Your Love".

== Track listing ==
All songs written by Dennis Lambert and Brian Potter unless otherwise shown.

=== Side 1 ===
1. "Hallway Symphony"
2. "One Good Woman"
3. "Like Monday Follows Sunday"
4. "Ain't No Woman (Like the One I've Got)"
5. "Bridge over Troubled Water/You've Got a Friend (Medley)" (Paul Simon/Carole King)

=== Side 2 ===
1. "On the Other Hand"
2. "Anna, No Can Do" (Alan Gordon)
3. "C'est la Vie"
4. "Don't Be Afraid of the World"
5. "If Every Man"
6. "Hallway Symphony (Reprise)"

== Personnel ==
- Guitar: Ben Benay, Dan Hamilton
- Bass: Joe Frank Carollo
- Keyboards: Dennis Lambert, Larry Knechtel, Tommy Reynolds, Virgil Weber
- Drums: Hal Blaine, Joe Correro
- Percussion: Tommy Reynolds
- Flute: Tommy Reynolds
- Strings: Jimmie Haskell, Sid Sharp
