= Wonderful Dream (Holidays Are Coming) =

2001 single by Melanie Thornton

Single by Melanie Thornton

from the album Ready to Fly
- Written: 2000
- Released: 26 November 2001
- Recorded: 2001
- Genre: R&B; Christmas; pop; gospel; holiday
- Length: 4:00
- Label: X-Cell
- Songwriters: Melanie Thornton; Mitchell Lennox; Julien Nairolf; Ben Naftali; Terry Coffey; Jon Nettlesbey; Rich Airis; Scott Kemper
- Producers: Julien Nairolf; Mitchell Lennox

Melanie Thornton singles chronology
"Makin' Oooh Oooh (Talking About Love)" (2001)	"Wonderful Dream (Holidays Are Coming)" (2001)	"In Your Life" (2002)

"Wonderful Dream (Holidays Are Coming)" is a song by American singer Melanie Thornton. It was written by Thornton, Mitchell Lennox, Julien Nairolf, Ben Naftali, Terry Coffey, Jon Nettlesbey, Rich Airis, and Scott Kemper and produced by Lennox and Nairolf. The song was also featured in a Coca-Cola Christmas promotional campaign, which makes use of altered lyrics. It is Thornton's best selling single to date and is played every Christmas season in Germany.

The song charted at number 3 in both Germany and Switzerland, number 5 in Austria, number 21 in Slovenia, and number 50 in Poland. The single eventually certified double platinum in both Germany and Austria.

The song was posthumously released on 26 November 2001, two days after Thornton died in the Crossair Flight 3597 plane crash. The song was also featured on the reissue of Thornton's Ready to Fly album that was released the same day.

== Track listings ==
European CD maxi single

1. "Wonderful Dream (Holidays Are Coming)" (radio version) – 3:50
2. "Wonderful Dream (Holidays Are Coming)" (Art-of-Soul Tight Mix) – 3:34
3. "Memories" – 4:22

== Charts and certifications ==
=== Weekly charts ===
Chart (2001–2026)	Peak position
Austria (Ö3 Austria Top 40)	5
Germany (GfK)	3
Global 200 (Billboard)	160
Poland Airplay (ZPAV)	50
Poland (Polish Streaming Top 100)	61
Slovenia (SloTop50)	21
Switzerland (Schweizer Hitparade)	3

=== Year-end charts ===
Chart (2002)	Position
Austria (Ö3 Austria Top 40)	37
Germany (Official German Charts)	44
Switzerland (Schweizer Hitparade)	31

2024 year-end chart performance for "Wonderful Dream (Holidays Are Coming)"
Chart (2024)	Position
Germany (GfK)	97

2025 year-end chart performance for "Wonderful Dream (Holidays Are Coming)"
Chart (2025)	Position
Germany (GfK)	90

=== Certifications ===
Region	Certification	Certified units/sales
Austria (IFPI Austria)	2× Platinum	80,000^{*}
Germany (BVMI)	5× Gold	1,500,000^{‡}
^{*} Sales figures based on certification alone.^{‡} Sales+streaming figures based on certification alone.

== Joe McElderry version ==
"Wonderful Dream (Holidays Are Coming)"

Single by Joe McElderry
- Released: 17 November 2013
- Recorded: 2013
- Genre: Pop, Christmas
- Length: 3:48
- Label: Touchstone Media
- Songwriters: Melanie Thornton; Mitchell Lennox; Julien Nairolf; Ben Naftali; Terry Coffey; Jon Nettlesbey; Rich Airis; Scott Temper
- Producer: Martin Jay

Joe McElderry singles chronology
"One World One Song" (2013)	"Wonderful Dream (Holidays Are Coming)" (2013)	"Gloria" (2017)

On 17 November 2013, English singer Joe McElderry released a cover of the song as a single and it charted at #37 on the UK Indie charts.

=== Charts ===
Chart (2013)	Peak position
UK Indie (Official Charts)	37

== Margaret version ==
Polish singer Margaret recorded a Polish-language version of the song titled "Coraz bliżej święta", which featured the finalists of the sixth season of The Voice of Poland. It was used in Polish Coca-Cola Christmas commercial, and was released for digital download on 3 November 2015. The song reached #32 in Poland the year it was released, and has re-entered the Polish charts each holiday season since, peaking at #15 in 2024. In 2025, Margaret released a solo version of the song.
