= Winners and Losers (song) =

Single by Hamilton, Joe Frank & Reynolds

from the album Fallin' in Love
- B-side: "Barroom Blues"
- Released: November 1975
- Genre: Soft rock
- Length: 3:13
- Label: Playboy Records P 6054
- Composers: Dan Hamilton, Ann Hamilton
- Producers: Dan Hamilton, Joe Frank Carollo, Alan Dennison

Hamilton, Joe Frank & Reynolds singles chronology
| "Fallin' in Love" (1975) | "Winners and Losers" (1975) | "Everyday Without You" (1976) |

"Winners and Losers" is a song by Hamilton, Joe Frank & Reynolds that became a hit in 1976. It followed their previous hit, "Fallin' in Love".

== Background ==
The songwriting credits are given to Dan Hamilton and Ann Hamilton who are also credited composer of "Fallin in Love". It was released on Playboy Records P 6054 in November 1975.

== Chart performance ==
In November 1975, the song debuted on the Billboard Hot 100 at No. 87. It peaked at No. 21 the weeks of January 24 and 31, 1976, and spent a total of 15 weeks on the chart. It reached No. 5 on the Billboard Easy Listening chart.

=== Weekly charts ===
| Chart (1975–76) | Peak position |
|---|---|
| Canada RPM Adult Contemporary | 7 |
| Canada RPM Top Singles | 21 |
| US Billboard Hot 100 | 21 |
| US Billboard Easy Listening | 5 |
| US Cash Box Top 100 | 18 |

=== Year-end charts ===
| Chart (1976) | Rank |
|---|---|
| Canada RPM Top Singles | 161 |
| US Billboard Easy Listening | 30 |
