= Fallin' in Love (album) =

Studio album by Hamilton, Joe Frank & Reynolds
- Released: November 1975
- Genre: Soft rock
- Label: Playboy
- Producer: Hamilton, Joe Frank & Reynolds

Hamilton, Joe Frank & Reynolds chronology
Hallway Symphony (1972)	Fallin' in Love (1975)	Love & Conversation (1976)

Professional ratings
Review scores
Source	Rating
Allmusic	2.5/5 stars

Fallin' in Love is the third studio album by the band Hamilton, Joe Frank & Reynolds and their first for Playboy Records with whom the band had signed in 1974 about a year after parting ways with their inaugural label Dunhill Records. The band's vocalist and guitarist, Dan Hamilton, wrote the majority of the material for this album (some of which he co-wrote with his wife, Ann). Pianist Alan Dennison also contributed his songwriting to the album with "Barroom Blues" and "Love Is" (the latter of which he co-wrote with the Hamiltons). The only cover on this album is Ellas McDaniel's composition of "Who Do You Love."

Released pursuant to the success of the title track - the sole #1 Pop hit for the band and also the only Playboy Records release to reach the Top 20 of the Billboard Hot 100 - the Fallin' in Love album would yield two further single releases: "Winners and Losers" (#21) and "Everyday Without You" #62.

Both this album and their next Playboy album Love & Conversation were released together in October 2005 as The Playboy Years.

== Track listing ==
=== Side 1 ===
1. "Winners and Losers" - (Dan Hamilton, Ann Hamilton) - 3:11
2. "Everyday Without You" - (Dan Hamilton) - 3:05
3. "Only Love (Will Break Your Heart)" - (Dan Hamilton) - 3:48
4. "What Kind of Love Is This" - (Dan Hamilton) - 3:40
5. "Fallin' in Love" - (Dan Hamilton, Ann Hamilton) - 3:03

=== Side 2 ===
1. "Badman" - (Dan Hamilton) - 3:33
2. "Who Do You Love" - (Ellas McDaniel) - 2:54
3. "Barroom Blues" - (Alan Dennison) - 4:12
4. "So Good at Lovin' You" - (Dan Hamilton) - 2:57
5. "Love Is" - (Dan Hamilton, Ann Hamilton, Alan Dennison) - 4:37

== Charts ==
=== Album ===
Year	Chart	Position
1975	Billboard 200	82

=== Singles ===
Year	Single	Chart	Position
1975	"Fallin' in Love"	Billboard Hot 100	1
1975	"Fallin' in Love"	Billboard Adult Contemporary	1
1975	"Fallin' in Love"	R&B Singles	24
1975	"Fallin' in Love"	UK Singles Chart	33
1976	"Winners and Losers"	Billboard Adult Contemporary	5
1976	"Winners and Losers"	Billboard Hot 100	21
1976	"Everyday Without You"	Billboard Hot 100	62
1976	"Everyday Without You"	Billboard Adult Contemporary	7
