= Hamilton, Joe Frank & Reynolds (album) =

Studio album by Hamilton, Joe Frank & Reynolds
- Released: May 1971
- Genre: Pop, soft rock
- Label: Dunhill
- Producer: Steve Barri

Hamilton, Joe Frank & Reynolds chronology
Hamilton, Joe Frank & Reynolds (1971)	Hallway Symphony (1972)

Singles from Hamilton, Joe Frank & Reynolds
- 1. "Don't Pull Your Love" Released: April 1971; 2. "Annabella" Released: August 1971

Professional ratings
Review scores
Source	Rating
Allmusic	2/5 stars

Hamilton, Joe Frank & Reynolds is the debut studio album by the band of the same name. Two singles were lifted from this album: "Annabella" and the band's first top 40 hit "Don't Pull Your Love."

== Track listing ==
Side 1
No.	Title	Writer(s)	Vocals	Length
1.	"Goin' Down"	Dennis Lambert, Brian Potter, Arthur Butler	Joe Frank Carollo, Dan Hamilton	2:59
2.	"Annabella"	Christian Arnold, David Martin, Geoff Morrow	Carollo, Hamilton	2:30
3.	"Sweet Pain"	John Hurley, Ronnie Wilkins	Carollo	2:50
4.	"It Takes the Best"	Hamilton, Tom Reynolds	Hamilton	3:13
5.	"Don't Refuse My Love"	Carollo, Reynolds	Carollo, Hamilton	2:57
6.	"Long Road"	Lambert, Potter	Hamilton	2:53

Side 2
No.	Title	Writer(s)	Vocals	Length
7.	"Don't Pull Your Love"	Lambert, Potter	Hamilton	2:40
8.	"What Can You Say"	Reynolds	Hamilton	2:49
9.	"Behold"	Lloyd Campbell, Phillip James	Carollo, Hamilton, Reynolds	2:40
10.	"Young, Wild and Free"	Reynolds	Reynolds	2:39
11.	"Nora"	Reynolds	Carollo	4:47

== Personnel ==
=== Hamilton, Joe Frank & Reynolds ===
- Dan Hamilton - lead vocals (1, 2, & 4–9), backing vocals, guitar
- Joe Frank Carollo - lead vocals (1–3, 5, 9 & 11), backing vocals, bass
- Tommy Reynolds - lead vocals (9 & 10), percussion, flute (including solo on 1), vibes (including solo on 11), steel drums, piano, backing vocals

=== Additional musicians ===
- Joe Correro, Jr. - drums
- Larry Knechtel - keyboards
- Ginger Blake, Maxine Willard, Venetta Fields - "girls" backing vocals

=== Miscellaneous ===
- Strings and horns arranged and conducted by Jimmie Haskell

== Charts ==
Album - Billboard (United States)

Year	Chart	Position
1971	Billboard 200	59

Singles - Billboard (United States)

Year	Single	Chart	Position
1971	"Annabella"	Billboard Hot 100	46
1971	"Annabella"	Billboard Adult Contemporary	21
1971	"Don't Pull Your Love Out"	Billboard Hot 100	4
1971	"Don't Pull Your Love Out"	Billboard Adult Contemporary	4
