= Dana Rayne =

American dance and pop singer (born 1981)

Dana Rayne (born March 5, 1981, on Long Island, New York) is an American dance and pop singer. Rayne was a success on the American club scene where she started off as a DJ in New York. This led to her releasing a song, "Object of My Desire" which was a eurotrance cover of Starpoint's popular dance tune in the mid 1980s. It reached the Top 10 of the UK Singles Chart in January 2005. Her second single, "Flying High" was never released, but can be found on some dance compilation albums.

Rayne's projects feature collaborations with Jeannie Ortega, Lucas Prata and Dose of Fulanito. Currently, Dana has joined with Lane McCray, an original member of La Bouche, and is touring at this time.

== Discography ==
- "Object of My Desire" (2005) #7 UK
- "Flying High" (EP (2005)
- "Make It On My Own" (2008)
- "Overload" (2010)
