= Hamilton, Joe Frank & Reynolds =

American soft rock trio

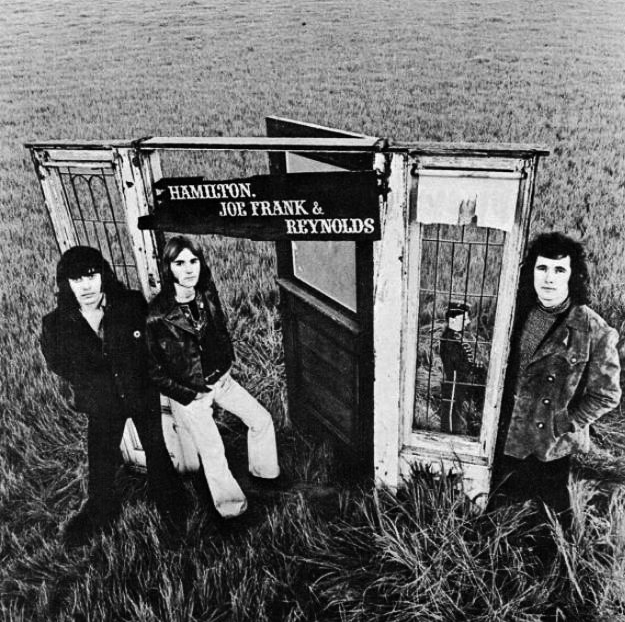
- Hamilton, Joe Frank & Reynolds in 1971

Background information
- Origin: Los Angeles, California, United States
- Genres: Soft rock, rhythm & blues
- Years active: 1968–1976, 1986–1988
- Labels: Dunhill Records; Playboy Records
- Past members: Dan Hamilton (deceased); Joe Frank Carollo; Tommy Reynolds; Alan Dennison (deceased)

Hamilton, Joe Frank & Reynolds were a 1970s soft rock trio from Los Angeles. The original members were Dan Hamilton (guitar/lead vocal), Joe Frank Carollo (bass/vocal), and Tommy Reynolds (multi-instrumentalist/vocal), all of whom had previously played in The T-Bones, a 1960s band noted for the instrumental hit "No Matter What Shape (Your Stomach's In)".

The group first hit the charts in 1971 with "Don't Pull Your Love". Reynolds left the group in late 1972 and was replaced by keyboardist Alan Dennison, but the band kept the name Hamilton, Joe Frank & Reynolds until 1976. This revised line-up performed the group's biggest hit, 1975's "Fallin' in Love".

== New line-up ==
The touring T-Bones formed by Dan Hamilton's brother Judd Hamilton hit the road in January 1966 to promote their first single "No Matter What Shape (Your Stomach's In)", an instrumental piece based upon a then-popular Alka-Seltzer TV commercial. After tens of thousands of miles of touring, Dee and Torres decided to leave the band and were replaced by Tommy Reynolds (who would, in 1969, be the lead singer for Shango) and Joe Frank Carollo. "No Matter What Shape (Your Stomach's In)" reached #3 on the US Billboard Hot 100 in March 1966. This revised version of The T-Bones toured the US and Japan. Their third and final album was not commercially successful and they disbanded near the end of 1976.

== Big hit ==
In 1970, Dunhill Records offered a recording contract to the newly formed Hamilton, Joe Frank and Reynolds. The following year, "Don't Pull Your Love", produced by Steve Barri and arranged by Jimmie Haskell, hit #1 on the Cash Box Top 100, peaked at #4 on the Billboard Hot 100 chart, sold over one million US copies, and was awarded a gold record by the RIAA in August 1971. It also went to #1 in Canada & Top 10 in Australia. Two more singles ("Annabella" and "Daisy Mae") charted, but two Hamilton, Joe Frank & Reynolds albums and several other singles failed to register any significant chart action.

Tommy Reynolds left the group in late 1972. Hamilton and Carollo continued touring with various session musicians, such as Larry Knechtel on keyboards and Joe Correro on drums. However, with their lack of success, their contract with Dunhill was cancelled in 1973. With the addition of Alan Dennison and Rick Shull, Hamilton, Joe Frank & Reynolds continued to perform locally.

== Name change and later years ==
In the latter part of 1974, they secured another recording deal with Playboy Records, which required that they retain the name Hamilton, Joe Frank & Reynolds, even though Reynolds had left the group. Within another few months, they released "Fallin' in Love", which reached #1 on the Billboard Hot 100. It also became their second gold disc and their only song to appear on the UK Singles Chart, where it was licensed to Pye Records and reached #33 in the autumn of 1975.

They followed this success with "Winners & Losers", which reached #21 in 1976, but their next releases, "Don't Fight the Hands (That Need You)" and "Everyday Without You", failed to reach the Top 40. While the band retained their original name on the cover of their Fallin' in Love album, the back cover showcased the more accurate name "Hamilton, Joe Frank & Dennison". For Love & Conversation, their second Playboy Records album in 1976, the band officially changed their name to Hamilton, Joe Frank & Dennison. In 1980, they again disbanded, this time permanently.

Hamilton continued to write and publish songs, and also wrote and recorded a couple of film themes. In late 1993, he became seriously ill and was eventually diagnosed as suffering from Cushing's syndrome. Hamilton died in Los Angeles on December 23, 1994, at the age of 48.

== Pop culture ==
In an episode of Mystery Science Theater 3000—Number 97, Season Five, Episode Two—the characters jokingly discussed how difficult it is for the average person to determine exactly how many people were in the group. Without seeing the name written down, one could assume it was a quartet ("Hamilton", "Joe", "Frank", and "Reynolds"), a duo ("Hamilton Joe Frank" and "Reynolds"), a trio (consisting instead of "Hamilton Joe", "Frank", and "Reynolds"), or even a quintet ("Hamilton", "Joe", "Frank", "Ann", "Reynolds").

"Don't Pull Your Love" was featured at the beginning of The West Wing episode "In the Shadow of 2 Gunmen Part II". The song was also heard in the movie When Harry Met Sally.... It was also featured in the 2017 DC animated feature Batman and Harley Quinn. "Fallin' in Love" appeared in the 2007 film The Hitcher.

A running joke from radio personality Dan Ingram, while a DJ at WABC AM, involved introducing the group as "Hamilton, Joe, Frank Reynolds and the entire Eyewitness News team", a reference to the band and a nod to ABC news anchor Frank Reynolds during his tenure as co-anchor of World News Tonight.

== Discography ==
=== Albums ===
Year	Album	Chart positions
Year	Album	US
1971	Hamilton, Joe Frank & Reynolds	59
1972	Hallway Symphony	191
1975	Fallin' in Love	82
1976	Love & Conversation (Note: Released as Hamilton, Joe Frank & Dennison)	-

=== Compilations ===
- 1995: Greatest Hits
- 2005: The Playboy Years

=== Singles ===
Year	Title	Chart positions					
Year	Title	US	US AC	US R&B	AUS	CAN	UK
1971	"Don't Pull Your Love"	4	4	-	10	1	-
1971	"Annabella"	46	21	-	-	22	-
1971	"Daisy Mae"	41	-	-	70	26	-
1972	"One Good Woman"	113	-	-	-	-	-
1975	"Fallin' in Love"	1	1	24	64	2	33
1975	"Winners and Losers"	21	5	-	-	21	-
1976	"Everyday Without You"	62	7	-	-	92	-
1976	"Light Up the World with Sunshine"	67	21	-	-	-	-
1976	"Don't Fight the Hands (That Need You)"	72	50	-	-	-	-

== For further reading ==
Reynolds, Robert (2018). The Music of Hamilton, Joe Frank and Reynolds. Columbia, SC: Lulu.com. ISBN 978-1-365-28876-0.
