= Akina (given name) =

- Pronunciation: akʲina (IPA)
- Gender: Female

Origin
- Meaning: different meanings depending on the kanji used

Akina is a Japanese feminine given name.

== Written forms ==
Akina can be written using many different combinations of kanji characters. Here are some examples:

- 明菜, "bright, greens"
- 明奈, "bright, Nara"
- 明名, "bright, name"
- 明那, "bright, that/what"
- 秋菜, "autumn, greens"
- 秋奈, "autumn, Nara"
- 秋名, "autumn, name"
- 亜稀菜, "Asia, rare, greens"
- 亜紀那, "Asia, chronicle, that/what"

The name can also be written in hiragana あきな or katakana アキナ.

== Notable people with the name ==
- Akina, a member of a four-girl J-pop idol group Faky
- Akina Homoto (法元 明菜, born 1996), a Japanese voice actress
- Akina Miyazato (宮里 明那, born 1985), a member of a five-girl J-pop idol group Folder 5
- Akina Minami (南 明奈, born 1989), a Japanese gravure idol
- Akina Nakamori (中森 明菜, born 1965), a Japanese pop singer
- Akina Pau, a Hong-Kong fencer
- Akina Shirt (born 1994), Canadian singer

== Fictional characters ==
- Akina (秋菜), a character in the anime television series Najica Blitz Tactics
- Akina Hiizumi (比泉 秋名), a character from the manga Yozakura Quartet
- Akina Yashiro (八代 暁名), a character in the shōjo manga series W Pinch
- Akina Nanamura (七村 秋菜), a character in the manga and anime series UFO Ultramaiden Valkyrie
- Akina Kubo (久保 明菜), a character in the manga and anime series Kubo Won't Let Me Be Invisible

== See also ==
- Akina (秋名), a mountain, appears in the anime Initial D
