= La Bouche =

German electronic dance duo

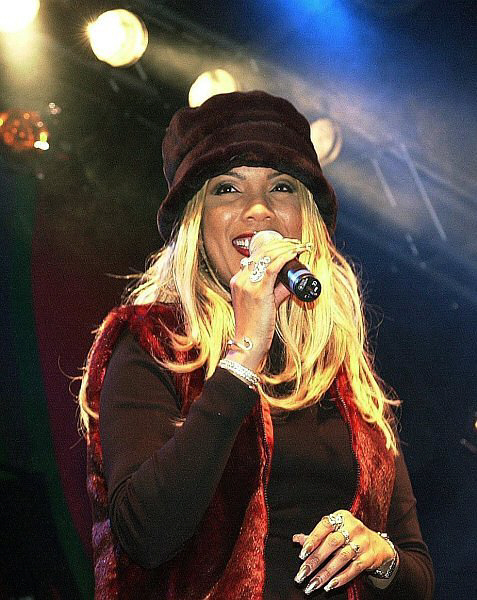
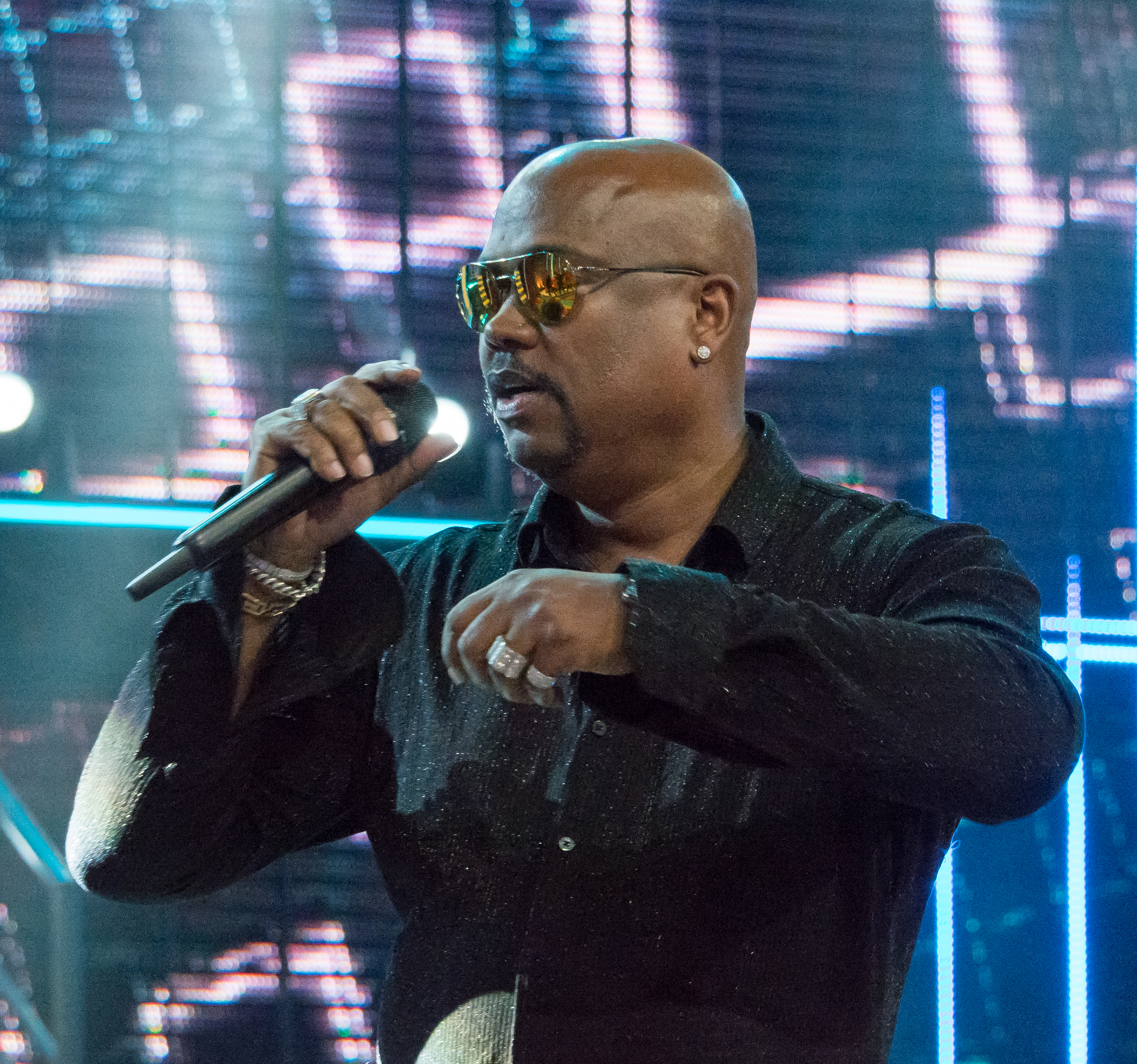
- Original members Melanie Thornton & Lane McCray

Background information
- Origin: Frankfurt am Main, Germany
- Genres: Eurodance; house; pop
- Years active: 1994–2002; 2007–present
- Labels: BMG; RCA; MCI
- Members: Lane McCray; Dana Rayne; Melissa Bonilla
- Past members: Melanie Thornton; Robert Haynes; Natascha Wright; Kayo Shekoni; Deidra Jones; Sophie Cairo; Belle Johnson
- Website: officiallabouche.com

La Bouche (pronounced [la buʃ]) is a German-American Eurodance group. Formed by music producer Frank Farian in 1994, the duo originally comprised Lane McCray and Melanie Thornton.

The duo began their musical career as part of Groovin' Affairs, a German band. After years of limited success, McCray and Thornton were signed to Frank Farian's music label MCI Records, distributed by Bertelsmann Music Group (BMG). After gaining recognition with the top-charting single "Sweet Dreams", they released their best-selling album Sweet Dreams (1995), which spawned the international Top 10 single "Be My Lover". Friction between Farian and the distributor label BMG resulted in La Bouche's follow-up album, A Moment of Love (1997), performing less successful than its predecessor, respectively. After the poor performance of the second album, Thornton embarked on a solo career and was briefly replaced by Natascha Wright in 2000.

Thornton's debut solo album, Ready to Fly, was released in May 2001 on X-Cell Records. However several months later in November 2001, Thornton was killed in a plane crash in Bassersdorf, Switzerland. Following the news of Thornton's death, McCray stopped performing and went on a musical hiatus. In 2007, McCray reformed La Bouche with several female counterparts throughout the years including Kayo Shekoni, Dana Rayne, Deidra Jones, Sophie Cairo, Belle Johnson, and Melissa Bonilla.

La Bouche has sold over 12 million records worldwide. La Bouche has received several accolades, including a Echo Award, a Goldene Europa, and three MTV Video Music Awards nominations.

== History ==
=== 1992–1994: Early beginnings and Groovin' Affairs ===
After traveling to Germany to pursue a music career February 1992, Melanie Thornton formed a R&B band called Groovin' Affairs. The group began performing locally in various parts of Germany. During one of the group's tours, one of the band members was unable to continue performing and recommended Lane McCray as his replacement. After McCray became a permanent member of the band, Thornton began doing studio session work for several production companies including Click Productions. One of the demo songs "Sweet Dreams" was sent to music producer Frank Farian and the remaining song "Tonight Is the Night" was released on Logic Records under the group name Le Click. Upon receiving the song, Farian asked Thornton if she knew of a male rapper to join her as if he was only interested in signing a male/female duo to his label. Originally Robert Haynes, the rapper on the song "Sweet Dreams", was asked to join Melanie but Haynes declined as he only wanted to be a music producer and songwriter. After Thornton later brought in Lane McCray, the group was signed to Farian's music label MCI Records as La Bouche. The name stemmed from their music producers watching Melanie sing in studio sessions and noticing that her was mouth really big when she was singing. One of the producers thought of "la bouche", which means "the mouth" in French.

=== 1994–1996: Sweet Dreams ===
On 13 April 1994, La Bouche released their debut single, titled "Sweet Dreams". The song, which features vocals from Thornton and rap vocals from session rapper Robert Haynes, became their first major hit, peaking in the top ten in various countries. The song preceded their debut studio album, Sweet Dreams, which was released on 12 June 1995. The album is a mixture of Eurodance and R&B, and its production was overseen by Frank Farian. Sweet Dreams peaked at number twenty-eight on the Billboard 200 and number three on the German Albums chart. The album's second single, "Be My Lover" became international success, selling over six million copies worldwide and peaking at number one in various European countries including Czech Republic, Germany, Romania, and Sweden. "Be My Lover" also won an ASCAP award for the "Most Played Song in America", as well as an Echo Award for "Best National Dance Single" in 1996.

La Bouche's success continued with the release of the singles "Fallin' in Love" and "I Love to Love"; the latter of which earned a certified gold record by Australian Recording Industry Association (ARIA). By September 1996, the album Sweet Dreams had sold millions of copies worldwide. In December 1996, they issued a remix album titled All Mixed Up, which also included "Tonight Is the Night"; which had been released under Le Click with Thornton's vocals.

=== 1996–2003: A Moment of Love, Melanie Thornton's departure, and aftermath ===
Frank Farian began to shift his focus away from La Bouche to concentrate on his other music acts including No Mercy. La Bouche release a single "Forget Me Nots", a cover of Patrice Rushen's song, but the single failed to chart. They follow-upped with the release of another single "Bolingo (Love Is in the Air)" in October 1996, which landed in the top twenty of a few European countries. In May 1997, La Bouche released the lead single, "You Won't Forget Me", from their forthcoming album. The song managed to chart within the top thirty of a few countries but ultimately considered a minor success when the song failed to rise to the level of "Sweet Dreams" and "Be My Lover". The duo's second album, A Moment of Love, was released in November 1997. Attempting to appeal to the American market, the album featured a lighter sound than the standard Eurodance sound. Despite this, the album was not considered a commercial success. The album's singles "A Moment of Love" and "S.O.S." failed to chart when tensions between Frank Farian and record company BMG began to surface. BMG withdrew their financial marketing of the album A Moment of Love.

In February 2000, Thornton left La Bouche to focus on her solo career and was replaced with South American singer Natascha Wright. Wright's debut vocals are featured on the single "All I Want", released in August 2000. Wright was later dismissed from La Bouche after due to her limited vocal ability and work ethic. She was replaced by Sweden singer Kayo Shekoni, a familiar singer from Le Click. By May 2001, Melanie Thornton had released her debut solo album Ready to Fly on X-Cell Records. Her album was a success in Germany and Switzerland, achieving gold certifications in both countries. While promoting her album on tour, she made her final performance in Leipzig on 24 November 2001. Several hours later, Thornton took a flight from Berlin to Zürich, Switzerland on Crossair Flight #3597 for upcoming nightclub performances and television appearances. She was among several passengers killed when the plane crashed into a hill in a local forest in the town of Bassersdorf, Switzerland. In May 2002, Frank Farian released a compilation album titled Best of La Bouche feat. Melanie Thornton. The compilation album spawned a single "In Your Life", an previously unreleased song featuring Thornton's vocals, which was released on anniversary on her death. Shortly after, McCray disbanded La Bouche and went on hiatus.

=== 2007–present: Lineup changes and recent projects ===
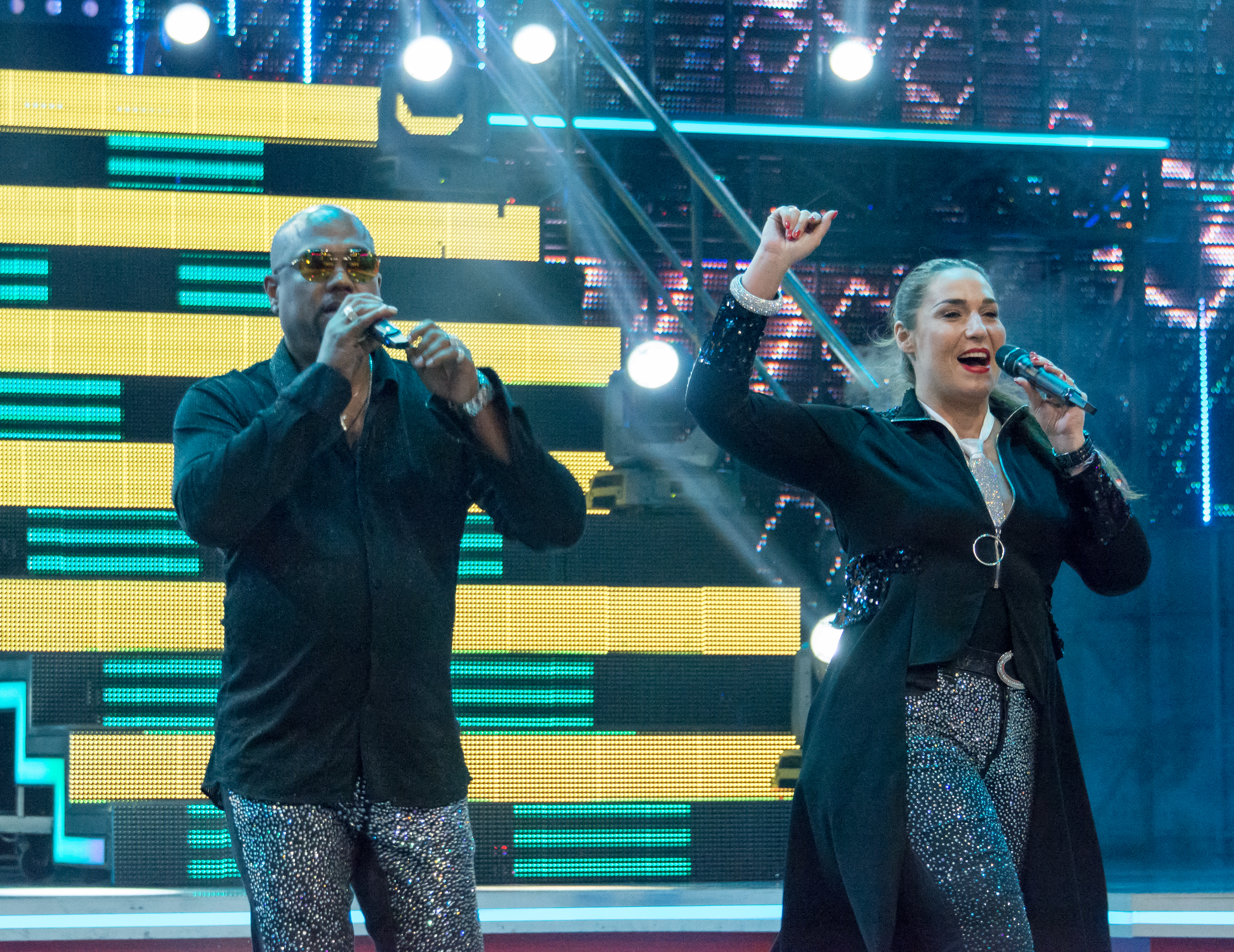
Lane McCray and Sophie Cairo performing in 2019

In 2007, McCray attempted to return to music and reformed La Bouche. After reaching out to management who told him that La Bouche had died with Melanie Thornton, he reunited his former manager Ruben Martinez and began performing again. While working under the same management, McCray was introduced to singer Dana Rayne a few hours before an upcoming show in Orlando, Florida. After rehearsing for a few hours, the duo made their first performance together on-stage. Rayne toured as the female vocalist of the music duo until 2014. She departed from La Bouche in favor of starting a family. With Rayne's departure, Kayo Shekoni briefly re-joined La Bouche. In 2015, Shekoni was briefly replaced with Deidra Jones for a few performances. The following year, Hungarian singer Sophie Cairo joined the lineup. The duo released two singles titled "Sweet Dreams 2017" (2017) and "Night after Night" (2018).

In 2020, La Bouche released several singles: "One Night in Heaven", "Rhythm of Love", "Ringing the Bells of Christmas". In 2022, Cairo left the group and was replaced by Belle Johnson, who performed with La Bouche until 2024. In December 2023, Kayo Shekoni rejoined and toured with the group throughout 2024. In 2025, Dana Rayne and Melissa Bonilla began alternating as the female vocalists of La Bouche.

== Legacy ==
La Bouche has sold over 12 million records worldwide. They have received several accolades, including a Echo Award and a Goldene Europa. Furthermore, they have garnered three MTV Video Music Awards nominations.

== Members ==
Current members

- Lane McCray (1994–2002, 2007–present)
- Dana Rayne (2007–2014, 2022, 2025–present)
- Melissa Bonilla (2025–present)

Former members

- Robert Haynes (Rap performance on "Sweet Dreams" only, 1994)
- Melanie Thornton (1994–2000, died 2001)
- Natascha Wright (2000–2002)
- Kayo Shekoni (2002, 2014–2015, 2024)
- Deidra Jones (2014–2015)
- Sophie Cairo (2016–2022)
- Belle Johnson (2022–2023)

== Discography ==
=== Studio albums ===
Album	Album details	Peak chart positions									Certifications
Album	Album details	AUS	AUT	FIN	NLD	NOR	NZ	SWE	SWI	US	Certifications
Sweet Dreams	Release date: 12 June 1995; Label: MCI; Formats: CD, cassette	10	9	2	41	26	6	29	2	28	RIAA: Platinum; ARIA: Platinum; BVMI: Gold; MC: Gold; SNEP: Gold; IFPI FIN: Gold; IFPI SWI: Gold
A Moment of Love S.O.S. (US version)	Release date: 17 November 1997; Label: MCI; Formats: CD, cassette	—	—	21	—	—	—	—	40	194	
"—" denotes studio albums that did not chart.

=== Remix albums ===
- All Mixed Up (1996)

=== Compilation albums ===
- Best of La Bouche feat. Melanie Thornton (2002)
- Greatest Hits (2007)

=== Singles ===
Year	Title	Peak chart positions										Certifications (sales threshold)	Album
Year	Title	GER	AUS	AUT	FRA	ITA	NLD	SWI	SWE	UK	US	Certifications (sales threshold)	Album
1994	"Sweet Dreams (Ola Ola E)"	8	8	3	32	1	31	5	13	44	13	BVMI: Gold; ARIA: Gold	Sweet Dreams
1995	"Be My Lover"	1	2	3	7	1	3	5	1	25	6	BVMI: Platinum; ARIA: Platinum; BPI: Gold; IFPI AUT: Gold; RIAA: Gold; SNEP: Silver	Sweet Dreams
1995	"Fallin' in Love"	13	39	13	24	13	—	19	13	43	111		Sweet Dreams
1995	"I Love to Love"	21	6	19	27	19	30	42	—	—	—	ARIA: Gold	Sweet Dreams
1996	"Forget Me Nots"	—	—	—	—	—	—	—	—	—	—		Sweet Dreams
1996	"Bolingo (Love Is in the Air)"	26	—	—	—	19	—	15	15	—	—		S.O.S.
1997	"You Won't Forget Me"	29	80	—	28	—	—	—	24	—	48		A Moment of Love
1998	"A Moment of Love"	100	—	—	—	—	—	—	18	—	—		A Moment of Love
1999	"S.O.S."	78	—	—	—	—	—	—	—	—	—		A Moment of Love
2000	"All I Want"	—	—	—	—	—	—	—	—	—	—		Non-album singles
2002	"In Your Life"	—	—	—	—	—	—	—	—	—	—		Non-album singles
2017	"Sweet Dreams 2017"	—	—	—	—	—	—	—	—	—	—		Non-album singles
2018	"Night After Night"	—	—	—	—	—	—	—	—	—	—		Non-album singles
2020	"One Night in Heaven"	—	—	—	—	—	—	—	—	—	—		Non-album singles

== Awards and nominations ==
Award	Year	Category	Work	Result	Ref.
MTV Europe Music Awards	1995	Best Dance Act	La Bouche	Nominated	
MTV Europe Music Awards	1995	Breakthrough Artist	La Bouche	Nominated	
Goldene Europa	1995	Best Duo/Group	La Bouche	Won	
MTV Video Music Awards	1996	Best Dance Video	"Be My Lover"	Nominated	
Echo Awards	1996	Best National Dance Single	"Be My Lover"	Won	
ASCAP Awards	1996	Most Played Song in America	"Be My Lover"	Won	
