= Akina (Akina Nakamori album) =

Studio album by Akina Nakamori
- Released: 8 November 2017
- Recorded: 2016–2017
- Genre: J-pop
- Length: 39:15
- Language: Japanese
- Label: Universal Music Group Japan
- Producer: Naoshi Fujikura; Don Flamingo

Akina Nakamori chronology
Vampire (2017)	Akina (2017)	Cage (2017)

Singles from Akina
- 1. "Hirari: Sakura" Released: 24 February 2016

Akina (明菜) is the twenty-fifth studio album by Japanese singer Akina Nakamori and final studio album to be released during the 2010 decade. It was released on 8 November 2017 under the Universal Music Group Japan label. The album was released as a part of the 35th debut anniversary celebration and on the same day as a cover album "Cage".

== Background ==
The title of album comes from Nakamori's name, Akina. It's dated to be first time to use her name as a part of title in her discography history.

The album includes only nine tracks in total, which makes the shortest album in the terms of the length.

The theme of the album is to catch the atmosphere of the Kadokawa movie of the 80s.

Merry Christmas: Yuki no Shizuku was recorded as a vocal song and as a vocal song and as an instrumental song with a sound of a small music box.

After the release, Nakamori's music release activities has been suspended without announcement during the time of release until 2023.

== Promotion ==
=== Single ===
The album includes leading track, a b-side track Hirari: Sakura written by Kouhei Nemumoto and Haruichi Shindō from the duo Porno Graffitti, which was recorded in the leading single Fixer: While the Woman are sleeping in 2015. Hirari Sakura has received a special remixed version with subtitle Akina version, unlike original version, which starts straight with the vocal part, album version has a thirty-seconds long instrumental intro.

== Chart performance ==
The album Akina debuted at number 9 on the Oricon Album Weekly Chart and charted for 6 weeks. On the Billboard Japanese charts, the album debuted at number 8 on Album Weekly Charts. On digital streaming service Recochoku's charts, the album debuted at number 2 on Digital Album Daily Charts and on number 10 on Digital Album Weekly Charts.

== Track listing ==
No.	Title	Lyrics	Music	Arranger(s)	Length
1.	"Merry Christmas: Yuki no Shizuku (メリークリスマス: 雪の雫)"	Miran	Koshin	Shunya Shimizu	4:43
2.	"Amar es Creer"	Yutaka Shinya	Shinya	Shinya	3:57
3.	"Amaoto (雨音)"	Shiori Suzuki	Kouhei Munemoto	Takebe	4:25
4.	"Maboroshi (まぼろし)"	Yurika Ohishi	Ohishi	Shinjirou Inoue	4:44
5.	"La.La.Bye"	Yuuka Kobayashi	Munemoto	Munemoto	4:52
6.	"Amore"	Carlos K.	Carlos K.	Carlos K.	4:38
7.	"Hirari: Sakura (Akina version)"	Haruichi Shindō	Munemoto	Munemoto	5:13
8.	"Fate: Unmei no Hito (fate ～運命のひと～)"	Keiya Mizuki	koshin	koshin, Shimizu	3:39
9.	"Merry Christmas: Yuki no Shizuku (orgel version)"		koshin		3:16

== Release history ==
Year	Format(s)	Serial number	Label(s)	Ref.
2017	CD, CD+DVD	UPCH-2140, UPCH-7366	UMJ	
2023	CD	UPCY-7844	UMJ	
