= Sweet Dreams (La Bouche song) =

La Bouche song

Single by La Bouche

from the album Sweet Dreams
- Released: April 13, 1994
- Recorded: January 1994
- Genre: Eurodance; hi-NRG
- Length: 3:23 (radio version); 4:50 (club version)
- Label: RCA
- Composers: Gerd Amir Saraf; Mehmet Sönmez
- Lyricists: Melanie Thornton; Gerd Amir Saraf; Robert Haynes
- Producers: Frank Farian; Ulli Brenner; Gerd Amir Saraf

La Bouche singles chronology
"Sweet Dreams" (1994)	"Be My Lover" (1995)

Music video
- "Sweet Dreams" on YouTube

"Sweet Dreams (Ola Ola E)" is a song recorded by German Eurodance duo La Bouche. It was originally released in April 1994 by RCA Records as the lead single from the duo's debut album of the same name (1995). In North America, the song was released in November 1995. It was written by Melanie Thornton of La Bouche with Robert Haynes and Mehmet Sönmez, and produced by Frank Farian, Ulli Brenner and Gerd Amir Saraf.

"Sweet Dreams" received favorable reviews from music critics and was a global commercial success, reaching number one in both Italy and on the Canadian RPM Dance/Urban chart. In the United States, it reached number 13 on the Billboard Hot 100, number three on the Billboard Hot Dance Club Play chart and number eight on the Cash Box Top 100, while in Australia, it also peaked at number eight. It received gold certifications in Australia and Germany. Two different music videos were produced to promote the single, directed by Nigel Simpkiss and Zak Ové, respectively.

In 2017, BuzzFeed ranked "Sweet Dreams" at number 53 in their list of the "101 Greatest Dance Songs of the '90s".

== Background and recording ==
American singer and songwriter Melanie Thornton of La Bouche began pursuing her dream of being a professional singer while singing in a band called Danger Zone. After two years with the band, she was looking to move on. Her sister then urged Thornton to come overseas, where the sister's family had contacts in the music industry. Thornton arrived in Germany in 1992 with $15 in her pocket and found work with some small-time record producers who needed a vocalist for demo tracks. She then discovered she could make more money in studio sessions than performing live gigs.

Thornton came to German producer Frank Farian's attention just accidentally. She was working as a studio session vocalist, recording "Sweet Dreams", a song she had co-written. It was recorded as her fifth or sixth song, when Farian heard it. Thornton told in an interview, "I wasn't actually looking for a record deal. He (Farian) loved it and wanted to release it on his label." Farian liked the song but wanted a rapper to perform on it also. Thornton then suggested American rapper Lane McCray, whom she had met three weeks earlier, while working with a cover band when he filled in as a replacement vocalist. McCray, a North Carolina native, was stationed in Germany while in the US Air Force. Thornton told in the same interview, "He was still in the Air Force at the time, but he agreed to do it. The next thing you know we're released and shooting up the charts in Italy."

== Composition ==
"Sweet Dreams" was written by Gerd Amir Saraf, Mehmet Sönmez, Melanie Thornton and Robert Haynes, and produced by Ulli Brenner, Saraf and Frank Farian. The song has a tempo of 134 beats per minute and is written in the key of B minor. It follows a chord progression of Bm7 – G – A, and the vocals span from A_{3} to B_{4}.

The song's bridge samples American funk band Ripple's 1973 song "I Don't Know What It Is, but It Sure Is Funky". The "Ola Ola E" chorus chant is derived from the song, "Rollin' With Kid 'N Play" by rap duo Kid 'n Play.

== Reception ==
=== Critical response ===
An editor from The Atlanta Journal-Constitution named "Sweet Dreams" a "high-energy hit". Michael Saunders from The Boston Globe praised the song as "glorious" and "effervescent". Gil L. Robertson IV from Cash Box magazine named it a standout track of the Sweet Dreams album. A Los Angeles Daily News reviewer considered it "energetic". Simon Price from Melody Maker felt the "scarily consistent" La Bouche "rok da house once again in reliably techno-tronic style." Pan-European magazine Music & Media remarked that the added value of this "throbbing piece of Euro dance is Melanie Thornton's massive vocals, which definitely set the track apart from most of her competition." Music & Media editor María Jímenez described it as "a high energy track with a pumped up familiar German techno sound and a little club hysteria," adding that it is "a prime candidate for crossing over."

Alan Jones from Music Week declared the song as "pulsating pop/hi-NRG with some refreshing bursts of guitar" and "yet another Euro-invader that is sure to score here." On the 1996 UK re-release, he added that its "throbbing, melodic Eurodance not too far removed from some of Snap's early work, it is hugely commercial. You have been warned." David Quantick from NME said, "Eurotrash but very nice with it. Better than Suede. No really. Well, the lyrics are, anyway." James Hamilton from Record Mirror named it a "routine Snap/Culture Beat-type (and Eurythmics influenced) Euro hit" in his weekly dance column. People magazine noted that the track "underscore buoyant vocals with dark minor-key arrangements". A reviewer from Richmond Times-Dispatch commented, "I am insanely jealous of the lead female vocal, Melanie Thornton. She has a wonderful, flexible voice."

=== Airplay ===
"Sweet Dreams" reached the number-one position on the European Dance Radio Chart in September 1994. On its year-end chart, it also ended up as number one, becoming the most played dance song on European radio that year. On the European Hit Radio chart, "Sweet Dreams" reached number 40 in the beginning of November 1994. And on the European airplay chart Border Breakers, the song entered at number 19 on 25 June 1994 due to crossover airplay in Southern Europe. It peaked at number five on 3 September 1994. In Latin America, "Sweet Dreams" became one of the most-played songs on radio in Brazil in 1995.

=== Commercial performance ===
"Sweet Dreams" was a major hit single in several markets across the globe. In Europe, it peaked at number one for four weeks in Italy in July and August 1994, and became a top-10 hit in Austria (3), Switzerland (5), Spain (6) and Germany (8). In the band's native Germany, "Sweet Dreams" spent 22 weeks in total within the German Singles Chart, with 7 weeks inside the top 10 and receiving a gold certification. Elsewhere in Europe, the single was a top-20 hit, as in Finland (15), Iceland (15), Ireland (16), and on the Eurochart Hot 100, where it peaked at number 17 after 18 weeks on the chart. In the United Kingdom, "Sweet Dreams" had two runs on the UK Singles Chart, in 1994 and 1996. Its best position was at number 44 on 1 September 1996. In the UK clubs, it was a bigger hit, peaking at number 20 on the RM Club Chart by Music Week. Elsewhere, it reached number three in Israel, number five in Japan and number eight in Australia, being awarded a gold certification by the Australian Recording Industry Association (ARIA), for sales of 35,000 copies.

"Sweet Dreams" was also successful in North America. In the United States, it peaked at number 13 on the Billboard Hot 100, number three on the Hot Dance Club Play chart and number eight the Cash Box Top 100 Pop Singles chart. In Canada, the single reached number one on the RPM Dance/Urban chart in 1994, and peaked at number 28 on the RPM Top Singles chart in 1996.

== Music videos ==
Two different music videos were made for "Sweet Dreams", one for the European market and one for the North American. The North American version was directed by British-Trinidad visual artist Zak Ové and released at the beginning of 1996. The European version was directed by Nigel Simpkiss, produced by Astrid Edwards for Swivel and released on 22 August 1994. The video was based on a concept of a vivid dance jamboree and features Thornton and McCray performing the song surrounded by candlelight, candelabrums, red curtains, a bonfire, soap bubbles and several back-up dancers. Some scenes show Thornton singing while lying in an iron bed with bedding in leopard and cow print. Other scenes see her sitting in a golden chair. Throughout the video, McCray performs with the other dancers. Towards the end, the duo perform in front of a fountain. "Sweet Dreams" was A-listed on German music television channel VIVA and received "prime break out" rotation on MTV Europe in October 1994. The video was later made available by Vevo on YouTube in 2016 and had generated more than 64 million views as of late 2025 on the platform.

== Legacy and impact ==
The success of "Sweet Dreams" and its follow-up "Be My Lover" earned La Bouche an award at the 1996 Dance d'Or awards in France. In 2017, American entertainment company BuzzFeed ranked "Sweet Dreams" at number 53 in their list of the "101 Greatest Dance Songs of the '90s". Matt Stopera and Brian Galindo stated that "the "hola, hola, eh" makes this a multilingual smash!" James Arena, writer of Stars of '90s Dance Pop: 29 Hitmakers Discuss Their Careers stated that the song and "Be My Lover", "are widely regarded today as indispensable classics of the decade."

== Track listing and formats ==
- 12-inch vinyl single

A1. "Sweet Dreams" (Club Mix) – 4:55
A2. "Sweet Dreams" (House Mix) – 6:38
B1. "Sweet Dreams" (Oriental Mix) – 5:17
B2. "Sweet Dreams" (Hola Mix) – 5:10

- CD single
1. "Sweet Dreams" (Radio Version) – 3:23
2. "Sweet Dreams" (House Mix) – 6:38
- CD maxi-single
1. "Sweet Dreams" (Radio Version) – 3:23
2. "Sweet Dreams" (Club Mix) – 4:55
3. "Sweet Dreams" (House Mix) – 6:38
4. "Sweet Dreams" (Oriental Mix) – 5:17
5. "Sweet Dreams" (Hola Mix) – 5:10
- CD maxi-single (Remixes)
1. "Sweet Dreams" (Airplay Edit) – 3:58
2. "Sweet Dreams" (Loveland UK Mix) – 7:00
3. "Sweet Dreams" (Italian No. 1 Mix) – 5:09
4. "Sweet Dreams" (French 'hit des clubs' Mix) – 5:35
5. "Sweet Dreams" (House Mix) – 6:38

== Charts ==
=== Weekly charts ===
==== Original release (1994) ====
Chart (1994–95)	Peak position
Austria (Ö3 Austria Top 40)	3
Canada Dance/Urban (RPM)	1
Europe (Eurochart Hot 100)	17
Europe (European Dance Radio)	1
Europe (European Hit Radio)	40
Finland (Suomen virallinen lista)	15
France (SNEP)	32
Germany (GfK)	8
Ireland (IRMA)	16
Israel (Israeli Singles Chart)	3
Italy (Musica e dischi)	1
Japan (Oricon)	5
Netherlands (Dutch Top 40)	32
Netherlands (Single Top 100)	31
Quebec (ADISQ)	16
Scottish Singles Sales (Official Charts)	84
Spain (AFYVE)	6
Sweden (Sverigetopplistan)	13
Switzerland (Schweizer Hitparade)	5
UK Singles (Official Charts)	63
UK Club Chart (Music Week)	20

==== Re-release (1996) ====
Chart (1996)	Peak position
Australia (ARIA)	8
Canada Top Singles (RPM)	28
Canada Adult Contemporary (RPM)	54
Iceland (Íslenski Listinn Topp 40)	15
New Zealand (Recorded Music NZ)	34
Scottish Singles Sales (Official Charts)	24
UK Singles (Official Charts)	44
US Billboard Hot 100	13
US Adult Top 40 (Billboard)	31
US Dance Club Play (Billboard)	3
US Maxi-Singles Sales (Billboard)	3
US Top 40/Mainstream (Billboard)	4
US Top 40/Rhythm-Crossover (Billboard)	13
US Cash Box Top 100	8

=== Year-end charts ===
Chart (1994)	Position
Canada Dance/Urban (RPM)	14
Europe (Eurochart Hot 100)	59
Europe (European Dance Radio)	1
Germany (Media Control)	51
Italy (Musica e dischi)	3

Chart (1995)	Position
Brazil (Crowley)	26

Chart (1996)	Position
Australia (ARIA)	47
US Billboard Hot 100	37
US Dance Club Play (Billboard)	36
US Maxi-Singles Sales (Billboard)	23
US Top 40/Mainstream (Billboard)	13
US Top 40/Rhythm-Crossover (Billboard)	43

== Certifications and sales ==
Region	Certification	Certified units/sales
Australia (ARIA)	Gold	35,000^{^}
Germany (BVMI)	Gold	250,000^{^}
^{^} Shipments figures based on certification alone.
