= Ready to Fly (Melanie Thornton album) =

Studio album by Melanie Thornton
- Released: 7 May 2001
- Recorded: 2000
- Genre: Pop, gospel, R&B, alternative pop, Europop
- Length: 51:40
- Label: X-Cell
- Producer: Mitchell Lennox; Julien Nairolf

Singles from Ready To Fly
- 1. "Love How You Love Me" Released: 6 November 2000; 2. "Heartbeat" Released: 9 April 2001; 3. "Makin' Oooh Oooh" Released: 3 September 2001; 4. "Wonderful Dream" Released: 26 November 2001 (Posthumously)

Ready to Fly is the only studio album by American singer Melanie Thornton. It was released by X-Cell Records on 7 May 2001, in German-speaking Europe after Thornton's departure as the lead vocalist of the Eurodance music duo La Bouche. Taking her solo work further into the soul pop and dance pop genres, Thornton worked with chief producers Mitchell Lennox and Julien Nairolf on the album, on which she co-wrote six tracks. Other collaborators include Todd Chisolm, Jay Tee Rogers, Martin Mayer, Rob Tyger, Raúl de Chile, and Bobby Stalker.

Upon its original release, Ready to Fly was a lukewarm commercial success, debuting at number 18 on the German Albums Chart. Following Thornton's death in the crash of Swiss airline's Crossair Flight 3597 in Bassersdorf on 24 November 2001, the album re-entered charts, eventually reaching the top five in Germany and Switzerland, where it was certified gold in 2002, pushed by a late 2001 re-issue of Ready to Fly which included her posthumously released hit single "Wonderful Dream (Holidays Are Coming)", a Coca-Cola Christmas promotional song.

== Critical reception ==
Ready to Fly received generally positive reviews from music critics. Laut.de rated the album four out of five stars and wrote: "Truly tragic that such a promising solo career was brought to an abrupt end. Ready to Fly could have become a cult pop album in no time at all. At least it has what it takes." Allmusic gave the album two and a half stars out of five.

== Track listing ==
All tracks are produced by Mitchell Lennox and Julien Nairolf; except "Back On My Feet Again," co-produced by Rob Tyger.

No.	Title	Writer(s)	Length
1.	"Love How You Love Me"	Melanie Thornton; Mitchell Lennox; Julien Nairolf	3:29
2.	"No Tears"	Thornton; Todd Chisolm	3:31
3.	"Heartbeat"	Jay Tee Rogers; Martin Mayer	3:54
4.	"Oooh Oooh (Talking About Love)"	Thornton; Lennox; Nairolf	3:20
5.	"Back on My Feet Again"	Lennox; Nairolf; Rob Tyger	3:58
6.	"I Wish It Was Love"	Thornton; Lennox; Nairolf	4:16
7.	"Intoxicated"	Rogers; Bobby Stalker	3:16
8.	"Walk On By"	Burt Bacharach; Hal David	4:22
9.	"Memories"	Lennox; Nairolf	4:22
10.	"It's Alright"	Thornton; Chisolm	3:51
11.	"Too Late"	Rogers; Raúl de Chile	3:16
12.	"I Apologize"	Thornton; Rogers; Stalker	3:53
13.	"Forever"	Lennox; Nairolf	3:39
14.	"Love How You Love Me" (Chicago Radio Remix)	Thornton; Lennox; Nairolf	3:29

Ready to Fly – Reissue
No.	Title	Writer(s)	Length
1.	"Love How You Love Me"	Thornton; Lennox; Nairolf	3:29
2.	"Wonderful Dream (Holidays Are Coming)"	Thornton; Lennox; Nairolf; Ben Naftali; Terry Coffey; Jon Nettlesbey; Rich Airis; Scott Temper	3:50
3.	"No Tears"	Thornton; Chisolm	3:31
4.	"Heartbeat"	Rogers; Mayer	3:54
5.	"Oooh Oooh (Talking About Love)"	Thornton; Lennox; Nairolf	3:20
6.	"Back on My Feet Again"	Lennox; Nairolf; Tyger	3:58
7.	"I Wish It Was Love"	Thornton; Lennox; Nairolf	4:16
8.	"Intoxicated"	Rogers; Stalker	3:16
9.	"Walk On By"	Bacharach; David	4:22
10.	"Memories"	Lennox; Nairolf	4:22
11.	"It's Alright"	Thornton; Chisolm	3:51
12.	"Too Late"	Rogers; de Chile	3:16
13.	"I Apologize"	Thornton; Rogers; Stalker	3:53
14.	"Forever"	Lennox; Nairolf	3:39
15.	"Love How You Love Me" (Chicago Radio Remix)	Thornton; Lennox; Nairolf	3:29
16.	"Heartbeat" (Chicago Radio Remix)	Rogers; Mayer	3:52

== Charts ==
=== Weekly charts ===
Chart (2001–02)	Peak position
Austrian Albums (Ö3 Austria)	20
German Albums (Offizielle Top 100)	5
Swiss Albums (Schweizer Hitparade)	4

Chart (2025)	Peak position
German Pop Albums (Offizielle Top 100)	12

=== Year-end charts ===
Chart (2002)	Position
German Albums (Official Top 100)	65
Swiss Albums (Schweizer Hitparade)	69

== Certifications ==
Region	Certification	Certified units/sales
Germany (BVMI)	Gold	150,000^{^}
Switzerland (IFPI Switzerland)	Gold	20,000^{^}
^{^} Shipments figures based on certification alone.

== Release history ==
List of release dates, showing region, edition(s), format(s), record label(s), and reference(s).
Region	Date	Edition(s)	Format(s)	Label(s)	Ref.
Austria	May 7, 2001	Standard edition	Digital download, CD	X-Cell	
Germany	May 7, 2001	Standard edition	Digital download, CD	X-Cell	
Switzerland	May 7, 2001	Standard edition	Digital download, CD	X-Cell	
Austria	November 26, 2001	New edition	Digital download, CD	X-Cell	
Germany	November 26, 2001	New edition	Digital download, CD	X-Cell	
Switzerland	November 26, 2001	New edition	Digital download, CD	X-Cell	
