= Be My Lover (La Bouche song) =

1995 single by La Bouche

- The singles European cover sleeve art

Single by La Bouche

from the album Sweet Dreams
- B-side: "Do You Still Need Me"
- Released: 2 March 1995
- Recorded: Early 1994
- Genre: Eurodance; dance-pop; disco; handbag house
- Length: 4:01; 3:44 (European video edit)
- Label: MCI; BMG
- Songwriters: Melanie Thornton; Uli Brenner; Gerd Amir Saraf; Lane McCray
- Producers: Frank Farian; Uli Brenner; Gerd Amir Saraf

La Bouche singles chronology
"Sweet Dreams" (1994)	"Be My Lover" (1995)	"Fallin' in Love" (1996)

Music video
- "Be My Lover" on YouTube

"Be My Lover" is a song by German Eurodance group La Bouche and released in March 1995 MCI Records and BMG as the second single from their debut album, Sweet Dreams (1995). The song was written by group members Melanie Thornton and Lane McCray with Uli Brenner and Gerd Amir Saraf, who co-produced it with Frank Farian.

"Be My Lover" became a number-one hit in the Czech Republic, Germany, Hungary, Romania, and Sweden, as well as on the Eurochart Hot 100. In the United States, the single reached numbers five and six on the Cash Box Top 100 and Billboard Hot 100, respectively. Two different music videos were produced to promote the single. "Be My Lover" earned La Bouche the 1996 Echo Music Prize in Germany in the category for Best Dance Single as well as the ASCAP Award in the US for the Most Played Song in America. It was dubbed into many megamix tracks and has had several remix versions.

In 2000, when Thornton left the group to start with her solo career, La Bouche released a new version of "Be My Lover" with vocals by Natascha Wright, who replaced Thornton as the female singer of the group.

== Background ==
American rapper Lane McCray met American singer Melanie Thornton in Saarbrücken, Germany while he was on active duty in the US Air Force. Thornton had moved from the US to Germany, where she performed as guest vocalist on dance-pop recordings. They went together in a band called Groovin' Affairs and were discovered by German record producer Frank Farian, known for Milli Vanilli and Boney M. Then they founded the Eurodance duo La Bouche. McCray and Thornton wrote "Be My Lover" together and started recording in early 1994. Because of McCray's duty in the US Air Force, La Bouche's success faced one minor challenge. But the duo went on becoming one of the most popular Eurodance acts of the mid-90s.

""Be My Lover" no one liked. I kept trying to find words for the "la da da dee" part of the song. We couldn't find any words so we just left it in the song."

— Lane McCray talking to Jerry Nunn about the song.

McCray told in a 2016 interview about how they came up with the name of the song, "We were at a gig in Germany, and in between sets she [Thornton] says to me, drying herself off with a towel, "So, how do you feel about mixing business with pleasure?" I responded that it was my experience that it doesn't usually work. I had dated a young lady who performed on the tour, and when she was mad at me she'd bring that on to the stage. But, then again, never say never. We continued doing the shows, and when we got into the studio, she said something like with all the time we had spent together, I should know if I wanted to be her lover. My response was that I heard what she was saying, but I needed to know more about her. Well, that's where that song came from."

== Composition ==
La Bouche's Melanie Thornton and Lane McCray co-wrote the song with Uli Brenner and Gerd Amir Saraf. It is written in the key of C♯ minor and follows a tempo of 134 beats per minute. "Be My Lover" follows a basic chord progression of C♯m–A–B, and the vocals span from G♯_{3} to F♯_{5}. The la-da-di-da-dah hook of the song, came from being unable to create the right lyrics to fill that portion of the music. So Thornton and McCray ad-libbed that portion, and decided to keep it like that.

== Critical reception ==
An editor from The Atlanta Journal-Constitution declared the song as a "high-energy hit". J.D. Considine from The Baltimore Sun described it as "searing". Larry Flick from Billboard magazine viewed it as "tirelessly giddy". Michael Saunders from Boston Globe praised it as a "glorious" and "twinkly" cut. Gil L. Robertson IV from Cash Box named "Be My Lover" a "standout track" from Sweet Dreams. Beth D'Addono from Delaware County Daily Times commented, "La da da dee da da da dah... Then that infectious disco beat kicks in, and 'Be My Lover' blares from the car radio, takes over the dance floor, reverberates through the health club, inspiring step classes to even greater heights." Lynn Dean Ford from Indianapolis Star compared the song to Snap! and Real McCoy, with "their relentless energy steeped in tension and computerization." Connie Johnson from Los Angeles Times wrote, "Sounding like a black ABBA crossed with the C+C Music Factory, Melanie Thornton and Lane McCray invest attitude into such tracks as 'Be My Lover', but you’d have to be a die-hard Euro-dance fan to appreciate it." Chuck Campbell from Knoxville News Sentinel said, "How does La Bouche's Top 10 hit [...] distinguish itself from the scores of other similar dance songs to be Flavor of the Month? It must be the opening la-da-da-di-da-da-da-da of vocalist Melanie Thornton (who then goes on a spree of la's, da's and di's). Otherwise it's an ordinary, albeit invigorating, dance track." In his weekly UK chart commentary, James Masterton stated that it "could well turn out to be one of the pop smashes of the year. Right from the 'La Da Da De Dah' introduction and hook this is one Euro-hit that has 'floor-filler' written all over it. Top 10 within a fortnight, just watch."

Paul Mathur from Melody Maker wrote, "They do a kind of Snap mangué thing which deeply excites both me and Simon Price. And it's the best bit of handbag until the soon-to-be-re-released 'Keep Warm' by Jinny." Another Melody Maker editor, Taylor Parkes, noted that "demand for 'Be My Lover' from returning holidaymakers is so colossal that, by time you read this, it'll have cannoned deep into the UK charts." He also called it "a beautifully quick, cheap thrill. Commerce in motion! Surrender to it!" Music Week gave "Be My Lover" three out of five, adding further that "this fairly standard piece of Europop is unlikely to top labelmates Real McCoy in the UK." The magazine's Alan Jones praised its "accomplished diva vocals" and "acute commercial nature". Jim Farber from New York Daily News deemed it as a "Euro-disco plea", that "sounds so freakishly retro." People Magazine noted that it "underscore buoyant vocals with dark minor-key arrangements". Richmond Times-Dispatch's reviewer said, "I am insanely jealous of the lead female vocal, Melanie Thornton. She has a wonderful, flexible voice." The Tampa Tribune stated that her vocals "are a little better than those of the average disco songstress." James Hamilton from the Record Mirror Dance Update described it as an "infectiously 'la de dah'-ed German smash by a Frankfurt based US duo in the usual Euro style". Andrew Diprose from Smash Hits also gave it three out of five, writing, "Repeat after me, La da da de da da dah add Dr Alban style rapping turn on a blender, voilà, 'Be My Lover'. What we have here is yer classic Bird'n'Bloke-type band scenario, with an infectious singalong choon. Two listens and you'll be hooked... or I'll eat my headphones!"

== Chart performance ==
"Be My Lover" topped both the US Billboard Dance Club Play chart and the Canadian RPM Dance/Urban chart, and it reached the top 10 of the US Cash Box Top 100 and Billboard Hot 100 charts. It also peaked at number one in Germany (4 weeks), Hungary, the Czech Republic, Mexico, Romania, and Sweden (1 week). Additionally, it peaked at number two in Australia, Iceland, Italy, the Netherlands and Norway. "Be My Lover" was a top-10 hit in at least 16 countries, including Belgium, Brazil, Denmark, El Salvador, France, Greece, Ireland, Peru, Spain, and Switzerland.

In the United Kingdom, it first reached number 27 on the UK Singles Chart in July 1995. The single also reached number two on the UK Pop Tip Club Chart by Music Week. Following its success on the US Billboard charts, the single was re-issued in the UK in February 1996, this time peaking at number 25.

On the Eurochart Hot 100, it reached number three on 27 May 1995, in its ninth week on the chart.

"Be My Lover" earned a gold record in Austria (25,000), Denmark (45,000), Germany (250,000), Italy (50,000), New Zealand (15,000), Norway, Spain (30,000), the UK (400,000), and the US (500,000); a silver record in France (125,000); and a platinum record in Australia (70,000).

== Music video ==
Two different music videos were made for this song: a European version and an American version.

The European version was filmed at the beginning of 1995, in the city at night. Melanie Thornton appears as a dominatrix wearing a black outfit. She is driving a van, abducting Lane McCray to an underground club, where several men are being held captive. They are hanging upside down from hooks in the ceiling. Thornton walks around these men while she sings. Suddenly, McCray manages to break free and raps toward Thornton. An edited version does not show McCray being captured and almost all the scenes with the men being hanging upside down were cut.

The American version was filmed in a recording studio at the beginning of 1996 with Thornton performing the song in front of a microphone. She has braids in her hair and wears a purple dress. McCray, wearing a black leather coat and sunglasses, raps in the control room of the studio, watching Thornton. This version was directed by Andras Mahr and filmed in Broadway Studios, New York City. In the US, it was BET that first played the video of "Be My Lover". It was A-listed on Germany's VIVA in April 1995. Two months later, it was A-listed on Dutch TMF and received active rotation on MTV Europe. On France's MCM, "Be My Lover" was B-listed in August same year.

== Awards ==
La Bouche won the 1996 Echo Music Prize in Germany for Best Dance Single with "Be My Lover", and the ASCAP Award in the US for the Most Played Song in America. The song was also nominated for Best Dance Video at the 1996 MTV Video Music Awards while La Bouche was nominated in the category for Best Dance at the 1995 MTV Europe Music Awards. The success of the group also earned La Bouche an award at the French 1996 Dance d'Or Awards.

== Retrospective response ==
In 2013, Vibe included "Be My Lover" in their list of "30 Dance Tracks from the '90s That Changed the Game". In 2015, it was ranked one of "The 50 Best Pop Singles of 1995" by Idolator. Bianca Gracie declared it as a "blood-pumping" tune "that combined energetic waves of synths with incredibly soulful vocals that kept bodies moving way longer than those endless rounds of Sex On The Beach cocktails ever could!". She added that "Be My Lover" "still provides a sense of euphoric escape that continues to refuel the spirit." In 2016, James Arena, the writer of Stars of '90s Dance Pop: 29 Hitmakers Discuss Their Careers called the song "blistering", noting further that it, with "Sweet Dreams", "are widely regarded today as indispensable classics of the decade."

In 2017, BuzzFeed ranked "Be My Lover" number six in their list of "The 101 Greatest Dance Songs of the '90s". Matt Stopera and Brian Galindo stated that "when you think of a '90s dance artist or group, La Bouche is on that list. A legend." In 2019, Billboard magazine featured it in their list of "Billboard's Top Songs of the '90s". In 2024, MTV 90s ranked "Be My Lover" number 11 in their list of "Top 50 Rhythms of Eurodance".

=== Accolades ===
Year	Publisher	Country	Accolade	Rank
1996	Echo Award	Germany	"Best National Dance Single"	1
1996	ASCAP Award	United States	"Most Played Song in America"	1
1996	MTV Video Music Awards	United States	Nomination for "Best Dance Video"	
2012	Porcys	Poland	"100 Singli 1990-1999"	70
2013	Vibe	United States	"Before EDM: 30 Dance Tracks from the '90s That Changed the Game"	16
2015	Idolator	United States	"The 50 Best Pop Singles of 1995"	30
2017	BuzzFeed	United States	"The 101 Greatest Dance Songs of the '90s"	6
2019	Billboard	United States	"Billboard's Top Songs of the '90s"	344
2023	PureWow	United States	"The 53 Best 90s Songs of All Time"	38
2024	MTV 90s	United Kingdom	"Top 50 Rhythms of Eurodance"	11

== Track listings ==
These are the formats and track listings of major single releases of "Be My Lover".

- 12-inch maxi – Europe
1. "Be My Lover" (Club Mix) – 5:28
2. "Be My Lover" (House Mix) – 4:26
3. "Be My Lover" (Trance Mix) – 6:35
4. "Be My Lover" (Radio Edit) – 3:59
- 12-inch maxi – US, UK, Ireland
1. "Be My Lover" (Spike Club Mix) – 8:54
2. "Be My Lover" (Club Mix) – 6:26
3. "Be My Lover" (Spike Dub) – 8:21
4. "Be My Lover" (Hi-NRG Mix) – 5:46
- CD and cassette single
1. "Be My Lover" (Radio Edit) – 3:58
2. "Be My Lover" (Trance Mix) – 6:35 (Germany only)
3. "Be My Lover" (House Mix) – 4:49 (France only)
4. "Be My Lover" (Radio Edit No Rap) – 3:50 (US only)
- CD maxi 1
1. "Be My Lover" (Radio Edit) – 3:58
2. "Be My Lover" (Club Mix 135 BPM) – 5:28
3. "Be My Lover" (Trance Mix 150 BPM) – 6:35
4. "Do You Still Need Me" – 3:35
- CD maxi – US
1. "Be My Lover" (Club Mix) – 6:26
2. "Be My Lover" (Spike Club Mix) – 8:54
3. "Be My Lover" (Hi-NRG Mix) – 5:46
4. "Be My Lover" (Alex Goes to Cleveland Mix) – 5:06
5. "Be My Lover" (Doug Laurent Classic Mix Edit) – 4:07
- CD maxi – Remixes
1. "Be My Lover" (Euro Dance Mix) – 6:12
2. "Be My Lover" (Hi-NRG Mix) – 5:47
3. "Be My Lover" (Serious Groove Dub Mix) – 5:41
4. "Be My Lover" (Alex Goes to Cleveland Mix) – 5:05
5. "Be My Lover" (Doug Laurent Classic Mix – Edit) – 4:10
6. "Be My Lover" (Trance Mix) – 7:12
7. "Be My Lover" (House Mix) – 4:51

== Charts ==
=== Weekly charts ===
Chart (1995–1996)	Peak position
Australia (ARIA)	2
Austria (Ö3 Austria Top 40)	3
Belgium (Ultratop 50 Flanders)	6
Belgium (Ultratop 50 Wallonia)	10
Canada Top Singles (RPM)	18
Canada Dance/Urban (RPM)	1
Czech Republic (IFPI)	1
Denmark (IFPI)	9
El Salvador (UPI)	9
Europe (Eurochart Hot 100)	3
Europe (European Dance Radio)	1
Europe (European Hit Radio)	35
Finland (Suomen virallinen lista)	18
France (SNEP)	7
Germany (GfK)	1
Hungary (Mahasz)	6
Iceland (Íslenski Listinn Topp 40)	2
Ireland (IRMA)	8
Israel (Israeli Singles Chart)	11
Italy (Musica e dischi)	2
Italy Airplay (Music & Media)	10
Mexico (Notitas Musicales)	4
Netherlands (Dutch Top 40)	2
Netherlands (Single Top 100)	3
New Zealand (Recorded Music NZ)	44
Norway (VG-lista)	2
Peru (UPI)	3
Quebec (ADISQ)	38
Romania (Romanian Top 100)	1
Scotland (OCC)	15
Spain (AFYVE)	6
Sweden (Sverigetopplistan)	1
Switzerland (Schweizer Hitparade)	5
UK Singles (Official Charts)	25
UK Dance (Official Charts)	20
UK Club Chart (Music Week)	26
UK Pop Tip Club Chart (Music Week)	2
US Billboard Hot 100	6
US Dance Club Play (Billboard)	1
US Maxi-Singles Sales (Billboard)	3
US Top 40/Mainstream (Billboard)	5
US Top 40/Rhythm-Crossover (Billboard)	7
US Cash Box Top 100	5

=== Year-end charts ===
Chart (1995)	Position
Austria (Ö3 Austria Top 40)	13
Belgium (Ultratop 50 Flanders)	28
Belgium (Ultratop 50 Wallonia)	34
Brazil (Crowley)	51
Canada Dance/Urban (RPM)	11
Europe (Eurochart Hot 100)	20
Europe (European Dance Radio)	15
France (SNEP)	22
Germany (Media Control)	9
Iceland (Íslenski Listinn Topp 40)	53
Israel (Israeli Singles Chart)	35
Latvia (Latvijas Top 50)	121
Netherlands (Dutch Top 40)	22
Netherlands (Single Top 100)	40
Sweden (Topplistan)	18
Switzerland (Schweizer Hitparade)	5
UK Pop Tip Club Chart (Music Week)	27

Chart (1996)	Position
Australia (ARIA)	18
US Billboard Hot 100	23
US Maxi-Singles Sales (Billboard)	13
US Top 40/Mainstream (Billboard)	16
US Top 40/Rhythm-Crossover (Billboard)	25

== Certifications ==
Region	Certification	Certified units/sales
Australia (ARIA)	Platinum	70,000^{^}
Austria (IFPI Austria)	Gold	25,000^{*}
Denmark (IFPI Danmark)	Platinum	90,000^{‡}
Denmark (IFPI Danmark) Hypaton and David Guetta mix	Gold	45,000^{‡}
France (SNEP)	Silver	125,000^{*}
France (SNEP) Hypaton and David Guetta mix	Gold	100,000^{‡}
Germany (BVMI)	Platinum	600,000^{‡}
Italy (FIMI)	Gold	50,000^{‡}
New Zealand (RMNZ)	Gold	15,000^{‡}
New Zealand (RMNZ) Hypaton and David Guetta mix	Gold	15,000^{‡}
Norway (IFPI Norway)	Gold	
Poland (ZPAV) Hypaton and David Guetta mix	Gold	25,000^{‡}
Spain (Promusicae)	Gold	30,000^{‡}
Switzerland (IFPI Switzerland) Hypaton and David Guetta mix	Platinum	20,000^{‡}
United Kingdom (BPI)	Gold	400,000^{‡}
United States (RIAA)	Gold	500,000^{^}
^{*} Sales figures based on certification alone.^{^} Shipments figures based on certification alone.^{‡} Sales+streaming figures based on certification alone.

== Release history ==
Region	Date	Format(s)	Label(s)	Ref.
Europe	2 March 1995	CD	MCI; BMG	
Australia	9 October 1995	CD; cassette	MCI; BMG	
Japan	21 October 1995	CD	Ariola; BMG Victor	

== Usage in media ==
The song was played in the 1995 Brazilian soap opera A Próxima Vítima, an episode of the American TV series Beverly Hills 90210 in 1996, the 1997 movie Romy and Michele's High School Reunion, the 1998 movie A Night at the Roxbury, the 1999 movie Earthly Possessions, and in an episode of the sitcom Step by Step. It was also spoofed as "One Zero 001" on a computer-themed episode of Bill Nye the Science Guy and used in Audition Online Dance Battle as a song. It can be vaguely heard in the background in the "World's Greatest Dick" episode of 3rd Rock from the Sun, in the gay bar that Sally Solomon (Kristen Johnston) and Harry Solomon (French Stewart) walk into at the beginning of the episode. It was played during the second episode of The Assassination of Gianni Versace: American Crime Story, as Gianni Versace (Édgar Ramírez) and his boyfriend Antonio D'Amico (Ricky Martin) enter a gay bar. In 2023, "Be My Lover" was used in episode 4 of Swedish TV-series Gaslight which was produced by SVT. The song was also featured in an ad for Downy Unstoppables. The song provides the dance music for the opening party scene of the 2025 Israeli satirical film "Yes," written and directed by Nadav Lapid. <https://www.imdb.com/title/tt36667493/soundtrack/?ref_=ttrv_dyk_snd>

== Cover versions, samples and remixes ==
- The song was covered by Hysterie in 2003.
- Romanian dance pop singer Inna sampled the song for her third studio album Party Never Ends and released it as an official single in 2013.
- Dutch DJ and producer Sam Feldt made a cover of this track with Alex Schulz for his album Sunrise in 2017.
- Akina Nakamori covered the song in her 2017 cover album Cage.
- In 2018, Austrian rapper Raf Camora and German rapper Bonez MC have used a sample of the song for their hit single "Kokain."
- Additionally in 2018, two Norwich City footballers (Onel Hernandez and Tom Trybull) were recorded dancing to the song after a win.
- In 2019, Italian artist Achille Lauro sampled the song for his hit single "1990"
- Hypaton and David Guetta released a future rave edit in 2023.
- In 2026, Spanish disc jockey DJ Sammy and Chris Diver sampled the song for the single "Don't Follow Me"
