= Gil Robertson IV =

African-American journalist and author (born 1964)

Gil Robertson IV (born August 13, 1964, in Los Angeles, California) is an African-American journalist and author. He is president of the African American Film Critics Association.

== Early life and education ==
Robertson attended South Park Elementary School in Los Angeles. He earned a B.A. degree in political science from California State University, Los Angeles.

== Career ==
Robertson is known for his contributions to numerous publications that include: the Los Angeles Times, The Atlanta Journal-Constitution, Black Enterprise and Essence Magazine among others. He is also founder and editor of the Robertson Treatment Syndicated Column (RTSC), one of America's most widely read urban lifestyle columns targeting the African American demo.

As an author, Robertson has contributed to the anthology Souls of My Brother and is a frequent contributor to the African American Almanac. His first book, Writing As A Tool of Empowerment, was published in 2003. On December 1, 2006, Agate Publishing released Not in My Family: AIDS in the African American Community, a collection of essays about the AIDS epidemic, edited by Robertson.

Robertson edited the anthology Family Affair: What It Means To Be African American Today.

Robertson became involved in the 2016 controversy surrounding the all-white list of Oscar nominees in the acting category. The president of the academy Cheryl Boone Isaacs, the first African American and third woman to lead the academy, denied in 2015 that there was a problem. When the nominations for acting were all white for a second year in a row, Robertson called it "offensive," and a repeat of the previous year's failure to recognize actors of color. He called for changes across the board in the academy. Robertson did not call for a boycott of the Oscars, as some activists have. He noted that his organization is working with other professional groups to correct the lack of diversity in Hollywood and at the Oscars.

Robertson is a member of the National Press Club. Robertson resides in Los Angeles and Atlanta.

== Awards and nominations ==
- NAACP Image Award
  - 2006: Nominee-Best Literacy Nonfiction-Not In My Family
- African American Literacy Award
  - 2007: Nominee-Best Non-Fiction-Not In My Family
