= Lane McCray =

American singer (born 1962)

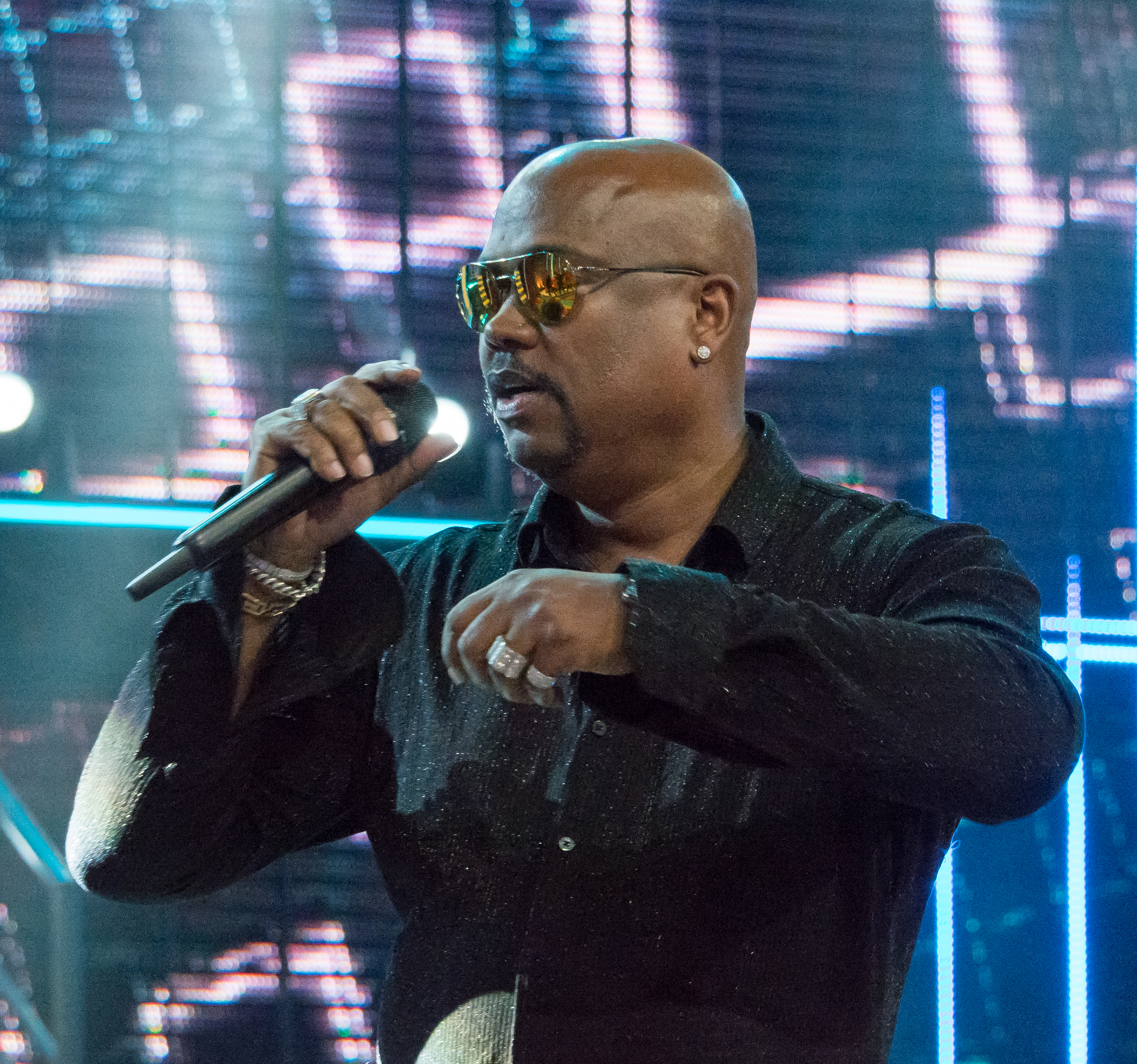

Background information
- Also known as: Lane
- Born: Donald Lane McCray Jr. April 13, 1962 (age 64); Fort Bragg, North Carolina, U.S.
- Genres: Eurodance, pop, gospel, hip hop
- Occupations: Singer, songwriter, rapper, artist
- Instrument: Vocals
- Years active: 1993–present
- Label: McCray Records
- Member of: La Bouche
- Website: La Bouche official website Lane McCray official website

Donald Lane McCray Jr. (born April 13, 1962) is an American singer, songwriter, rapper and artist best known for fronting the Eurodance group La Bouche.

He was stationed at various military installations around the globe with the United States Air Force. As an all-around entertainer in the US, Lane performed in regional musical theater productions of West Side Story, A Chorus Line, Tom Foolery, Sophisticated Ladies and La Bohème.

McCray left the USAF to pursue his musical career full-time. It was in Saarbrücken, Germany where he met Melanie Thornton (1967–2001) when they fronted the cover band Groovin' Affairs, going on to form La Bouche.

After Thornton died in a Crossair 3597 plane crash in 2001 while promoting a re-release of her solo album Ready to Fly, McCray shied away from the limelight and took some time to mourn the death of his friend and partner. As of 2015, Lane (La Bouche) began working with a few different singers Dana Rayne, Timi Kullai, Sophie Cairo, Kim Sanders and Kayo Shekoni, with him as the focal point.

In September 2019, Lane was set to release a brand new La Bouche single with subsequent tracks to follow to the release of a full-length album.

As of 2020, McCray has embarked on a new musical journey under his own namesake "MCCRAY." The first release on McCray Records was entitled "Save My Life," about which he said: "There are many facets to all of us and for me there are just as many facets to my tastes in music." MCCRAY's latest single, entitled "I Keep Running," was released on October 1, 2021.

== Personal life ==
Lane is the son of Lane McCray Sr. (1937–2016) and Joyce McCray (b. 1940), brother of Doreen (b. 1958) and Deidre (b. 1959), father of Shannon Breonna McCray (b. 1983) and grandfather to Hamza Ishmael and Hafsa.

Lane resides in Germany where he continues to express himself through painting and has established the "Lane McCray Art Gallery."

Lane McCray devotes a great deal of his time educating people on HIV/AIDS through local, national, and international foundations.

== Discography ==
- 2021 - I Keep Running (McCray Records)
- 2021 - Save My Life (McCray Records)
- 2020 - Ringing The Bells of Christmas (Blanco Y Negro)
- 2020 - One Night In Heaven (Nene Musik)
- 2018 - Night After Night (Nene Musik)
- 2017 - Sweet Dreams 2017 (McCray Records)
- 2017 - Thankful (McCray Records)
- 2016 - I Feel You/Single Lane McCray Featuring BG The Prince of Rap (DMN Records)
- 2016 - Dream/Single by Lane McCray (DMN Records)
- 2015 - Sweet Dreams/Single by Lane McCray Vs DJane Monique (DMN Records)
- 2015 - Part of Me/Single by Lane McCray Featuring Maestro Riko (DMN Records)
- 2014 - Heartbeat/Single by Lane McCray Featuring Down South (DMN Records)
- 2008 - Be My Lady/Single (202 Digital)
- 2003 - In Your Life/Single (Logic Records)
- 2002 - In Your Life/Single (BMG Berlin/MCI)
- 2001 - All I Want/Single (BMG Berlin/MCI)
- 2000 - SOS/LP (US) (RCA)
- 1999 - A Moment of Love/LP (BMG Berlin/MCI)
- 1999 - You Won't Forget Me (BMG Berlin/MCI)
- 1999 - SOS/Single (RCA)
- 1997 - All Mixed Up/LP (RCA)
- 1996 - Falling in Love/Dance Mix (RCA)
- 1996 - Sweet Dreams/Single (RCA)
- 1995 - Be My Lover/Single (RCA)
- 1995 - Falling in Love/Single (BMG/Logic)
- 1995 - I Love to Love/Single (BMG/Berlin/MCI)
- 1995 - Be My Lover/Single (BMG Berlin/MCI)
- 1994 - Sweet Dreams/Single (BMG Berlin/MCI)
