= Coming Home for Christmas (song) =

"Coming Home For Christmas"

Single by Banaroo

from the album Christmas World
- Released: 11 November 2005
- Genre: Christmas pop
- Length: 3:23
- Label: Universal
- Songwriters: Carsten Wegener, Timo Hohnholz
- Producers: Carsten Wegener, Timo Hohnholz

Banaroo singles chronology
| "Space Cowboy" (2005) | "Coming Home For Christmas" (2005) | "Uh Mamma" (2006) |

"Coming Home for Christmas" is a song by the German band Banaroo, from their second studio album, Christmas World. The song is written and produced by Carsten Wegener and Timo Hohnholz.

In 2009 Vicky Chassioti as Vicky Chase covered the song and released it as her debut single on 20 November 2009 through Na klar! Records.

== Chart performance ==
In Germany, "Coming Home for Christmas" debuted at number twelve on the German Singles Chart after the single release, making it Banaroo's third single to chart on the German Singles Chart. After four weeks the song moved from number twelve to number eight, which became its peak. "Coming Home for Christmas" became their third highest peaking song on the German Singles chart, behind "Dubi Dam Dam" and "Space Cowboy".

The song debuted on the Ö3 Austria Top 75 of Austria at number 19 and at number 16 on the Swiss Schweizer Hitparade charts. After four weeks on the Ö3 Austria Top 75 the song moved from number 19 to number five, which became its peak. In Switzerland the song reached its peak (number 9) after four weeks.

== Track listing ==
- Digital download - EP
1. "Coming Home for Christmas" (Radio Version) – 3:23
2. "Coming Home for Christmas" (Video Version) feat. Die Toggo 5 – 3:22
3. "Coming Home for Christmas" (Extended Mix) – 5:36
4. "Coming Home for Christmas" (Dance Remix) – 3:35
- CD single
1. "Coming Home for Christmas" (Radio Version) – 3:23
2. "Coming Home for Christmas" (Video Version) feat. Die Toggo 5 – 3:22
3. "Coming Home for Christmas" (Extended Mix) – 5:36
4. "Coming Home for Christmas" (Dance Remix) – 3:35
5. "Coming Home for Christmas" (Video) – 3:23

== Charts ==
| Chart (2005–2006) | Peak position |
|---|---|
| Austria (Ö3 Austria Top 40) | 5 |
| Germany (GfK) | 8 |
| Switzerland (Schweizer Hitparade) | 9 |
