= Jacqueline Badran =

Swiss businesswoman and politician (born 1961)

Jaqueline Badran
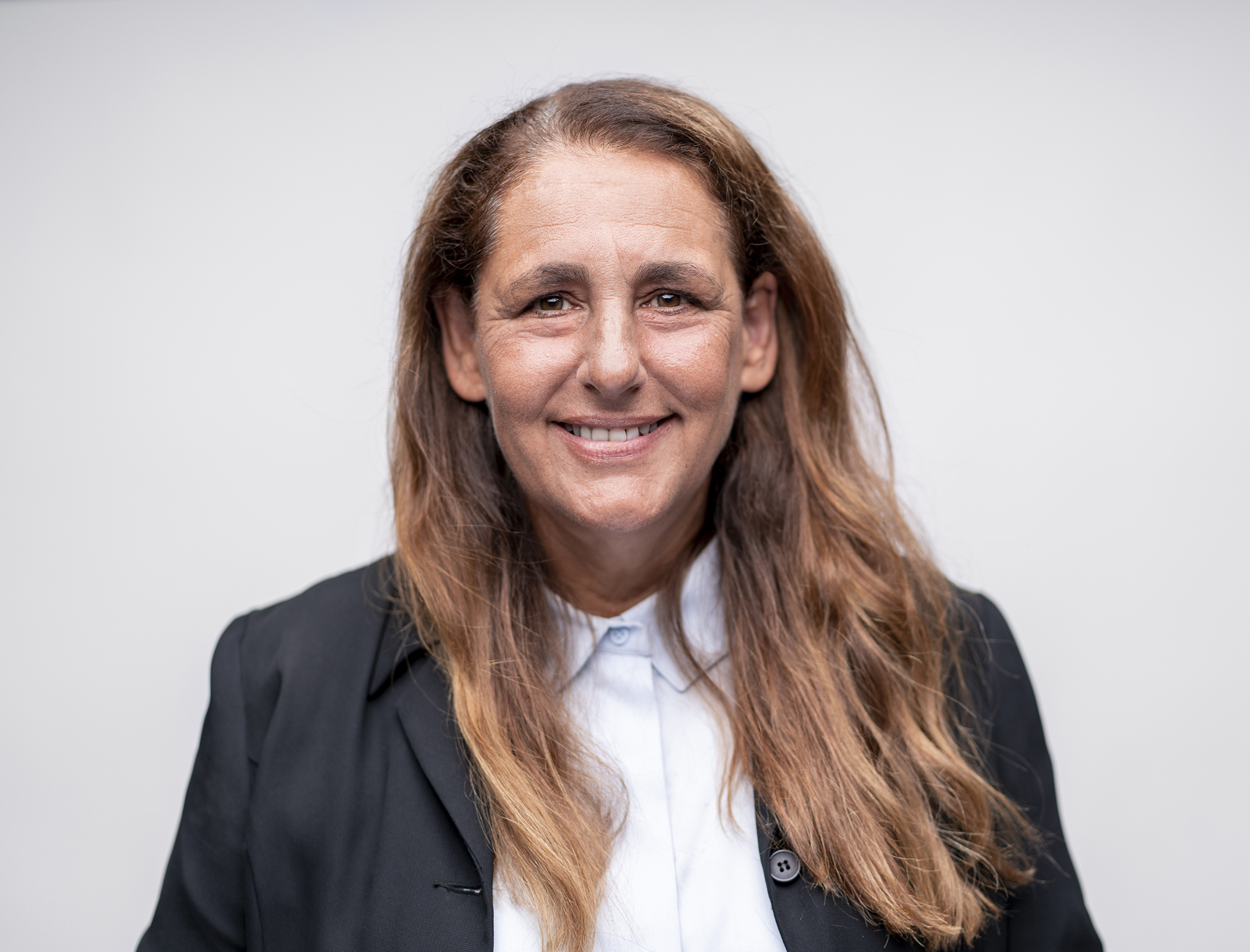
- Official portrait, 2019

Member of the National Council
- Incumbent
- Assumed office 5 December 2011
- Constituency: Canton of Zurich

Vice president of the Social Democratic Party of Switzerland
- In office 1 April 2020

Personal details
- Born: Jacqueline Badran; 12 November 1961 (age 64) Sydney, Australia
- Party: Social Democratic Party
- Spouse: Victor Kemper (m. 1992)
- Education: University of Zurich (Diploma); University of St. Gallen (Licentiate)
- Occupation: Businesswoman, politician
- Website: Official website Parliament website

Jacqueline "Jackie" Badran (German pronunciation: [ˈʒakliːn baˈdraːn]; born 12 November 1961) is a Swiss businesswoman and politician who currently serves on the Swiss National Council since 2011. Since 2020, she concurrently serves as vice president of the Social Democratic Party.

She is primarily known for her efforts in regard to affordable housing, including a campaign to ban Airbnb. She also holds Australian citizenship. She is one of the survivors of the Crossair Flight 3597 crash.

== Early life and education ==
Badran was born 12 November 1961 in Sydney, Australia, one of two daughters, to Frederick George Badran, a Lebanese Australian businessman in the textile industry, and Swiss-born Helga Badran (née Horisberger; later Countess Fabbricotti; born 1936). She has an older sister Karin Tamina Deilmann (née Badran).

Her father was a Lebanese Christian from Beirut who came to Australia in the 1920s where he built up several businesses from scratch, including textile firm Badran's of Wollongong. Later he was able to build a factory for menswear. Her father was introduced to her Swiss-born mother while staying at the Baur au Lac in Zurich on a business trip.

Badran spent her early years living in Darling Point, Sydney, before relocating to Zurich in 1966. She attended the local schools before spending two gap years traveling the world before studying biology at the University of Zurich. Badran also obtained a licentiate in economics and political science from the University of St. Gallen.

== Professional career ==
During her studies she worked as a ski instructor and at the counter of a cinema. In 2000, together with two business partners, she founded a user-centered design agency, Zeix AG, which she has been CEO of since 2004.

== Political career ==
In 1991 she joined the Social Democratic Party (SP) for which she was elected to the municipal council in of Zurich 2002 in which she stayed until 2011. She was elected to the Swiss National Council in the Swiss parliamentary elections in 2011 and re-elected in the parliamentary elections in 2015 and 2019. In January 2020, she announced her candidacy for the vice presidency of the SP, but under the condition that Mattea Meyer and Cedric Wermuth would become the copresidents. Since December 2020, she is the vice-president of the SP. Following an exhaustive, but successful campaign against the abolishment of the Issuance Tax, she announced a pause from politics for a few months.

=== Political positions ===
She became known nationally as a local politician in Zurich through her consistent and successful fight to preserve the Lex Koller (a law prohibiting non-residents from owning land in Switzerland). On several occasions she has been strongly committed to working out counter-proposals to popular initiatives.

== Personal life ==
In 1992, Badran married Victor Kemper, a Dutch bicycle messenger, who took his wife’s surname. They have no children.

Badran holds Swiss and Australian dual citizenship. Badran survived two serious disasters: In 1993, she was buried by an avalanche in the Engadin. On 24 November 2001, she survived the crash of Crossair Flight 3597 near Bassersdorf, which killed 24 people.
