= Sound of Cherona =

Studio album by Cherona
- Released: 5 August 2009
- Recorded: 2008–2009
- Genre: Pop, euro-house, schlager, EDM
- Length: 42:38
- Label: Sony

Singles from Sound of Cherona
- 1. "Ching Chang Chong" Released: 23 April 2009; 2. "Rigga-Ding-Dong-Song" Released: 9 July 2009; 3. "Dragonfly" Released: 24 September 2009

Sound of Cherona is the debut and only studio album by the German pop group Cherona.

== Track listing ==
Standard Edition
| No. | Title | Length |
|---|---|---|
| 1. | "Sound of Africa (Heyama)" | 3:37 |
| 2. | "Ching Chang Chong" | 3:20 |
| 3. | "Dragonfly (Cover of Smile.dk)" | 3:23 |
| 4. | "Rigga-Ding-Dong-Song (cover of Passion Fruit)" | 3:26 |
| 5. | "Dancing In The Rain" | 4:07 |
| 6. | "In The Middle Of Now" | 3:50 |
| 7. | "Standing Together" | 3:26 |
| 8. | "Golden Sky (Cover of Smile.dk)" | 3:05 |
| 9. | "Discotheque (Cover of Yamboo)" | 3:20 |
| 10. | "Hurry Up (SOS)" | 4:00 |
| 11. | "Spaceman" | 3:54 |
| 12. | "Time For Summer Holidays" | 3:12 |

== Charts ==
| Chart (2009) | Peak position |
|---|---|
| Austrian Albums (Ö3 Austria) | 9 |
| German Albums (Offizielle Top 100) | 20 |
| Swiss Albums (Schweizer Hitparade) | 21 |
