= Vicky Chase =

Vicky Chase may refer to:

- Vicky Chassioti, German singer and member of the pop group Cherona, who used the stage name Vicky Chase
- Victoria Chase (disambiguation), several fictional characters
