= Cherona =

German-Ukrainian Europop group

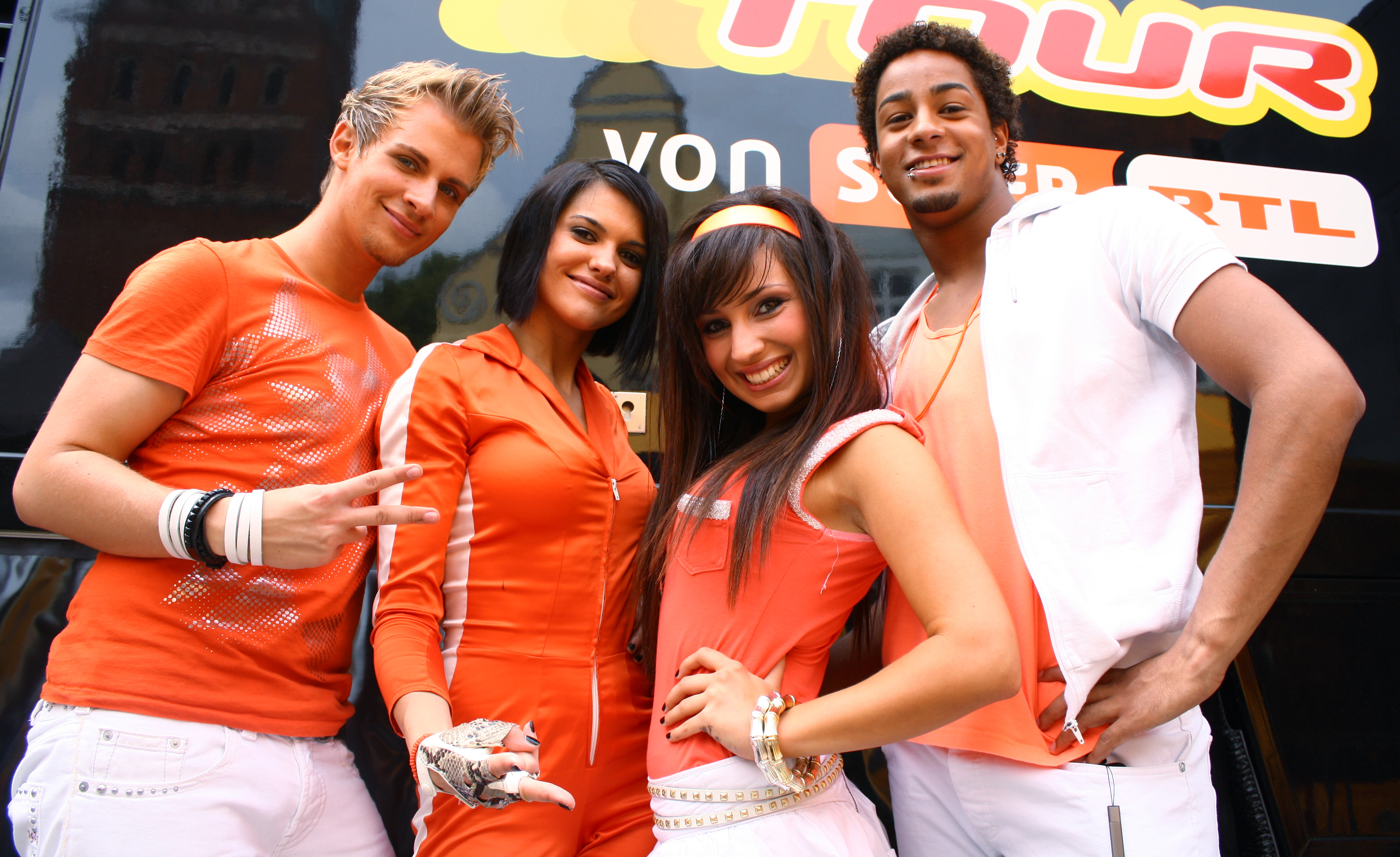
- Cherona in Lüneburg (Toggo Tour 2009)

Background information
- Origin: Cologne, Germany
- Genres: Pop, Eurodance
- Years active: 2008-2010
- Label: Sony Music
- Members: Vicky Chassioti; David Petters; Milla Chernysheva; Enrico Yakubu Bade
- Website: Cherona.de

Cherona is a German-Ukrainian Europop group that was formed by the TV station Super RTL. The first single, "Ching Chang Chong" was released on 1 January 2009, and peaked at #15 in the German Top 100. Their follow-up song "Rigga-Ding-Dong-Song", originally by the group Passion Fruit, was also a hit. Both appear in the band's 2009 album Sound of Cherona. The group parted ways in 2010 due to creative differences.

== Band members ==
Cherona consisted of:

- Vicky Chassioti (born in Gevelsberg, Germany, 12 August 1991) - later known as Vicky Chase
- David Petters (born in Brandenburg an der Havel, Germany, 24 July 1986)
- Milla Chernysheva known as Milla Rock (born in Novovolynsk, Ukraine, 1 December 1983)
- Enrico Yakubu Bade (born in Soltau, Germany, 2 November 1987).

=== Other activities ===
==== Vicky Chase ====
In November 2009, Vicky Chassioti made her solo debut with the stage name Vicky Chase covering the Banaroo song "Coming Home for Christmas". The single was released on 20 November 2009 through Na klar! Records. Her first album, Stop Talking, was released on 4 June 2010.

==== Milla Rock ====
Since early 2011 to 2021, Milla Rock was a founder, songwriter and singer of the Ukrainian-Canadian rock band Zapovid from Toronto. Zapovid has played at numerous events and festivals in Canada and United States with bands like Mad Heads XL, Los Colorados, Horpyna, Kozak System, and Mandry. As of 2025 Milla Rock is pursuing a solo career and has released several singles, including “Daggers,” “Limitless,” “Gotta Keep On,” and “Paperland.”

== Discography ==
=== Albums ===
Year	Title	Peak		
Year	Title	DE	AT	CH
2009	Sound of Cherona	20	9	21

=== Singles ===
Year	Title	Peak			Albums
Year	Title	DE	AT	CH	Albums
2009	Ching Chang Chong	36	17	-	Sound of Cherona
2009	Rigga-Ding-Dong-Song	56	48	-	Sound of Cherona
2009	Dragonfly	79	53	-	Sound of Cherona
2009	Sound of Africa (Heyama)	-	-	-	Sound of Cherona
