= I'll Fly Away (disambiguation) =

"I'll Fly Away" is a hymn written by Albert E. Brumley in 1929.

I'll Fly Away may also refer to:

- I'll Fly Away (TV series)
- "I'll Fly Away" (Banaroo song)
- I'll Fly Away: Further Testimonies from the Women of York Prison, an anthology edited by Wally Lamb
- I'll Fly Away (Homeland), an episode of the TV series Homeland
- I'll Fly Away (Miss Spider's Sunny Patch Friends)

== See also ==
- "One Day I'll Fly Away", a song by Randy Crawford
