= Banaroo's World =

Studio album by Banaroo
- Released: July 2005
- Recorded: 2005
- Genre: Pop, dance-pop
- Length: 43:00
- Label: Universal
- Producer: Josh Alexander, Alex Geringas, E. Haines, Pete Kirtley, Obi Mhondera, Billy Steinberg, Hannah Thomson, Peter-John Vettese

Banaroo chronology
Banaroo's World (2005)	Christmas World (2005)

Singles from Banaroo's World
- 1. "Dubi Dam Dam"; 2. "Space Cowboy"

Banaroo's World is the debut album from German pop group Banaroo. It was released in July 2005. Singles include "Dubi Dam Dam" and "Space Cowboy".

== Production ==
Almost all the tracks on the album were created by different composers and producers. The song "Dubi Dam Dam" was produced by Carsten Wegener and Timo Hohnholz. Likewise the play "Ringa Ding Ding". Also a third title of the album, called "In the Name of Love", comes from them. The seventh track, "How Deep Is Your Love," also comes from her pen. They added another song to the album. This is "I Never Want to Live My Life Without You". The sixth song that Wegener and Hohnholz produced was the play "Living In A Red Balloon". Christian Geller, who was already responsible for all four studio albums beFour group, wrote the track "Bubble Gum".

Thorsten Brötzmann and Ivo Moring were responsible for the titles "Fun, Fun" and "Shoobi Dubi Du". Composition and lyrics come from "Space Cowboy", which was released as a second single, by Thorsten Brötzmann, Terri Bjerre and Ivo Moring. For the play "Make You See the Stars" three completely different songwriters and producers were requested. Dietmar Hamann, Astrid Lange and Solomon N. Thomas wrote and produced the song for Banaroo. The last song of the record, "Is It Love?", Was produced by Didi Hamann and Astrid Lange. The album also contains the music video for "Dubi Dam Dam".

== Release ==
Finally, the album was released in Germany, Austria and Switzerland on June 20, 2005. It placed in first place in Germany (30 weeks in the chart rating) and in Austria (23 weeks in the chart rating). In Switzerland, the longplayer made it to seventh place and stayed on the charts for 19 weeks. From the album two singles were decoupled. These were "Dubi Dam Dam" and "Space Cowboy". The debut single became the band's most successful, as the song sold more than 150,000 times. The song "Space Cowboy" also made it to the charts in two countries.

== Single's ==
Dubi Dam Dam

As a debut single appeared on May 22, 2005, the song "Dubi Dam Dam". Also in the Netherlands, the title made a chart entry. Here, the piece could place in position 36 and fell after four weeks from the charts. The video was directed by Robert Bröllochs. Tobias Rupp recorded all scenes. The production manager was Matthias Sperle. The production company that created the elaborate fantasy video was the Camelot film productions. charts maximum

Space Cowboy

"Space Cowboy" was released as the second and last single from the album. The song finished fifth in Germany and was a total of ten weeks in the charts. In 12th place the song made it in Austria and in Switzerland the musical work was in position 17. Here the single was also represented in Germany as in Germany ten weeks in the chart standings. The video was produced by Michael Bröllochs. Also in this video shoot Robert Bröllochs was the director. The pictures are from Jason West. Matthias Sperle is the head of this production. The music company GmbH is the distributor of the Camelot film productions, which also produced "Dubi Dam Dam".

== Track listing ==
1. "Dubi Dam Dam"
2. "Bubble Gum"
3. "Fun, Fun"
4. "Ringa Ding Ding"
5. "Space Cowboy"
6. "In The Name Of Love"
7. "How Deep Is Your Love"
8. "Shoobi Dubi Du"
9. "Make You See The Stars"
10. "I Never Wanna Live My Life Without You"
11. "Living In A Red Balloon"
12. "Is It Love"

Extra:

- Dubi Dam Dam" (Video)

== Charts and certifications ==
=== Weekly charts ===
Chart (2005)	Peak position
Austrian Albums (Ö3 Austria)	1
German Albums (Offizielle Top 100)	1
Swiss Albums (Schweizer Hitparade)	7

=== Year-end charts ===
Chart (2005)	Position
Austrian Albums (Ö3 Austria)	11
German Albums (Offizielle Top 100)	17
Swiss Albums (Schweizer Hitparade)	76

=== Certifications ===
Country	Sales	Certification
Austria	10,000	Gold
Germany	200,000	Platinum
Switzerland		Gold
