= Crossair Flight 3597 =

2001 aviation accident in Switzerland

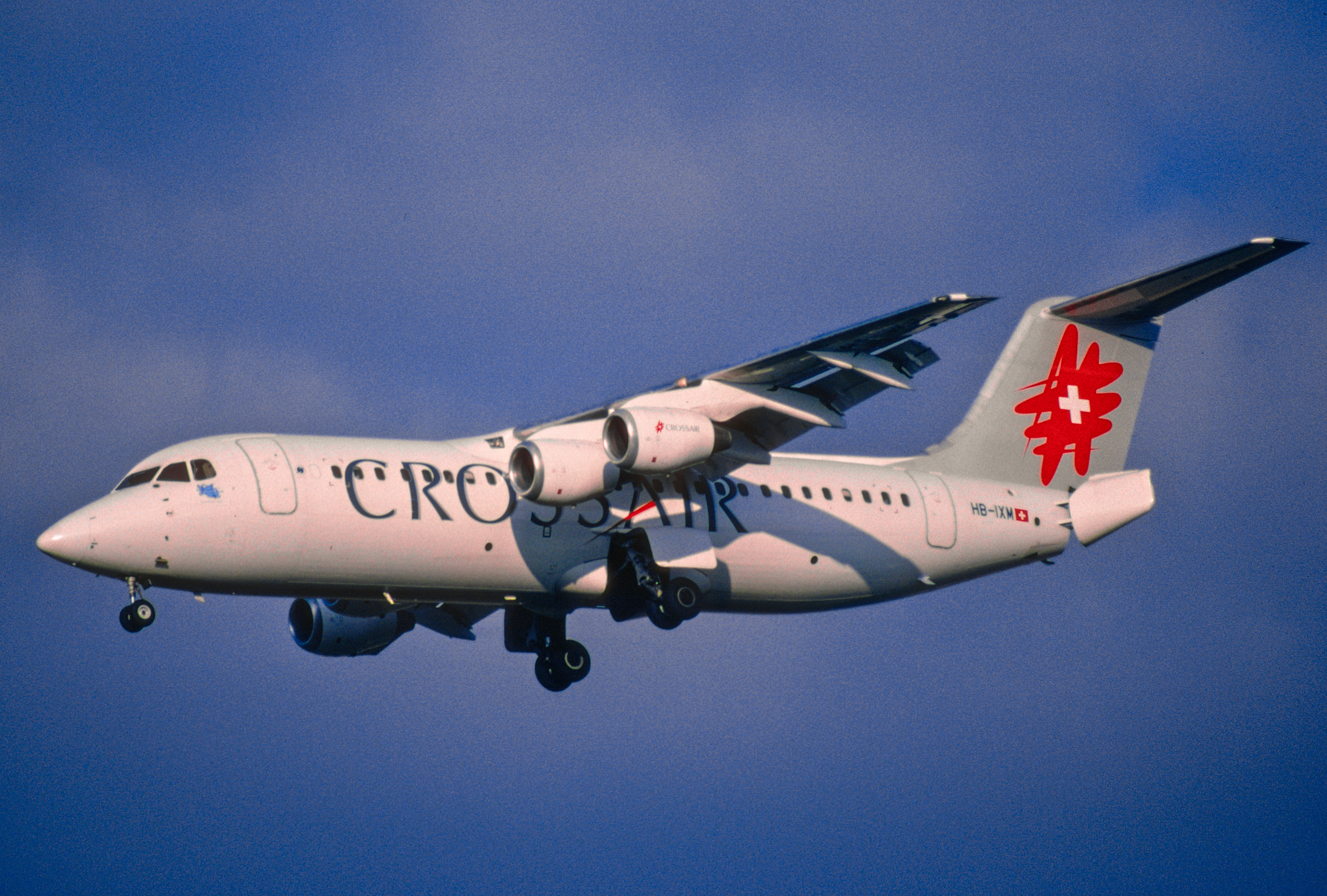
- HB-IXM, the aircraft involved in the accident, pictured in July 2001

Accident
- Date: 24 November 2001
- Summary: Controlled flight into terrain due to navigational and pilot error
- Site: Bassersdorf, near Zurich Airport, Switzerland; 47°27′14″N 8°37′24″E

Aircraft
- Aircraft type: Avro RJ100
- Operator: Crossair
- IATA flight No.: LX3597
- ICAO flight No.: CRX3597
- Call sign: CROSSAIR 3597
- Registration: HB-IXM
- Flight origin: Berlin Tegel Airport, Germany
- Destination: Zurich Airport, Switzerland
- Occupants: 33
- Passengers: 28
- Crew: 5
- Fatalities: 24
- Injuries: 9
- Survivors: 9

Crossair Flight 3597 was a scheduled flight from Berlin Tegel Airport, Germany, to Zurich Airport, Switzerland. On 24 November 2001, the Avro RJ100 operating the route, registered as HB-IXM, crashed into a wooded range of hills near Bassersdorf and caught fire as a controlled flight into terrain. Out of the 33 occupants, nine people survived.

== Aircraft ==
The accident aircraft, an Avro 146-RJ100, with registration HB-IXM, was manufactured in 1996, and had logged more than 13,000 flying hours in 11,500 cycles at the time of the crash. The aircraft was powered by four Lycoming LF507-1F turbofan engines.

== Accident ==
Flight 3597 departed Berlin Tegel Airport at 21:01 CET with 28 passengers, three flight attendants, and the cockpit crew consisting of Captain Hans Ulrich Lutz (57) and First Officer Stefan Löhrer (25). Lutz was a highly experienced pilot with more than 19,500 flight hours, approximately 19,300 of which were as pilot in command. Löhrer, in contrast, was inexperienced, with just 490 total flight hours.

Upon arrival in Zurich airspace, about an hour after takeoff from Berlin, the pilots were cleared for an instrument landing system (ILS) approach to runway 14, but were switched to a VOR/DME (VHF Omnidirectional Range/Distance Measuring Equipment) approach to runway 28 due to a noise abatement statute after 22:00 CET. There were poor visibility conditions due to low clouds, and the cockpit voice recorder (CVR) captured the transmission of a previously landing Crossair flight informing air traffic control (ATC) that they could not see the runway until 4.1 km (2.5 mi) away. At 22:07 CET, Flight 3597 crashed into a wooded range of hills near the small town of Bassersdorf, around 4 km (2.5 mi) short of the runway, where it broke apart and burst into flames. 24 people died, including both of the pilots and 1 flight attendant, while 7 passengers and 2 flight attendants survived.

== Passengers ==
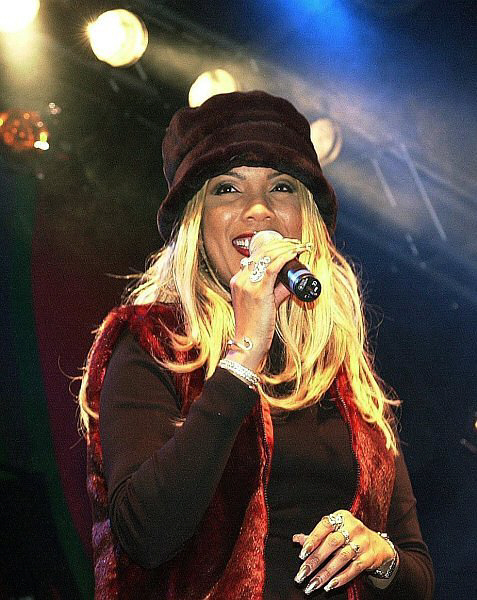
American singer and former La Bouche member Melanie Thornton was one of the passengers who died in the crash. She is pictured here on the night of the disaster.

Nationality	Passengers (dead)	Crew (dead)	Total (dead)
Canada	1	0	1
Germany	10	0	10
Ghana	1	0	1
Israel	3	0	3
Netherlands	1	0	1
Spain	1	0	1
Sweden (Note: Passenger had Sweden-United Kingdom dual Citizenship)	1	0	1
Switzerland	2	3	5
United States (Note: Passenger had Germany-United States dual Citizenship)	1	0	1
Total (dead)	21	3	24

Flight 3597 was carrying a total of 33 occupants; 5 crew members and 28 passengers were on board.

Among the 24 people that lost their lives in the accident were Melanie Thornton, the former lead singer of the German Eurodance duo La Bouche, and singers Nathaly van het Ende and Maria Serrano Serrano of the German-Dutch Eurodance trio Passion Fruit; the group's third singer, Debby St. Maarten, and manager were among the nine people that survived.

Swiss businesswoman and politician Jacqueline Badran and her colleague Peter Hoegenkamp were among the survivors of the crash.

== Investigation ==
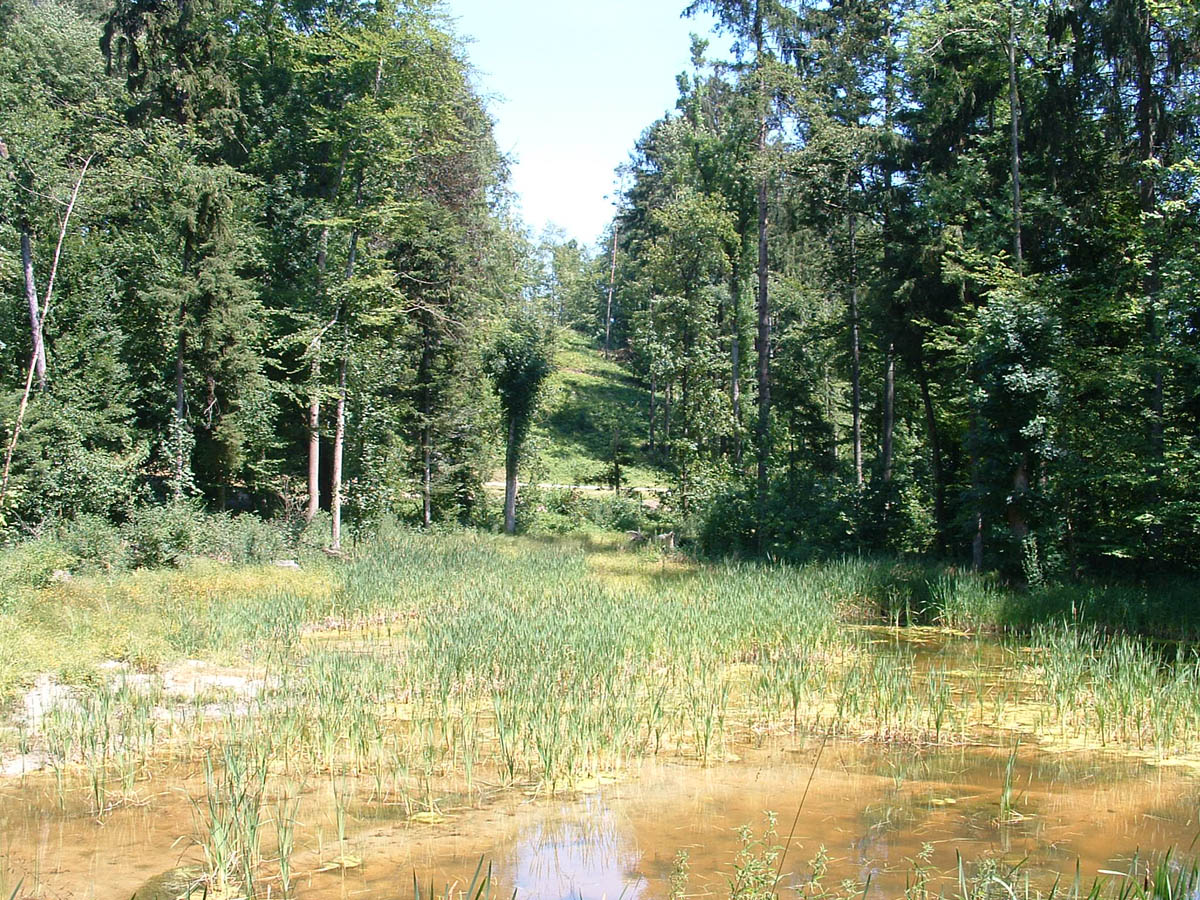
The site of the crash

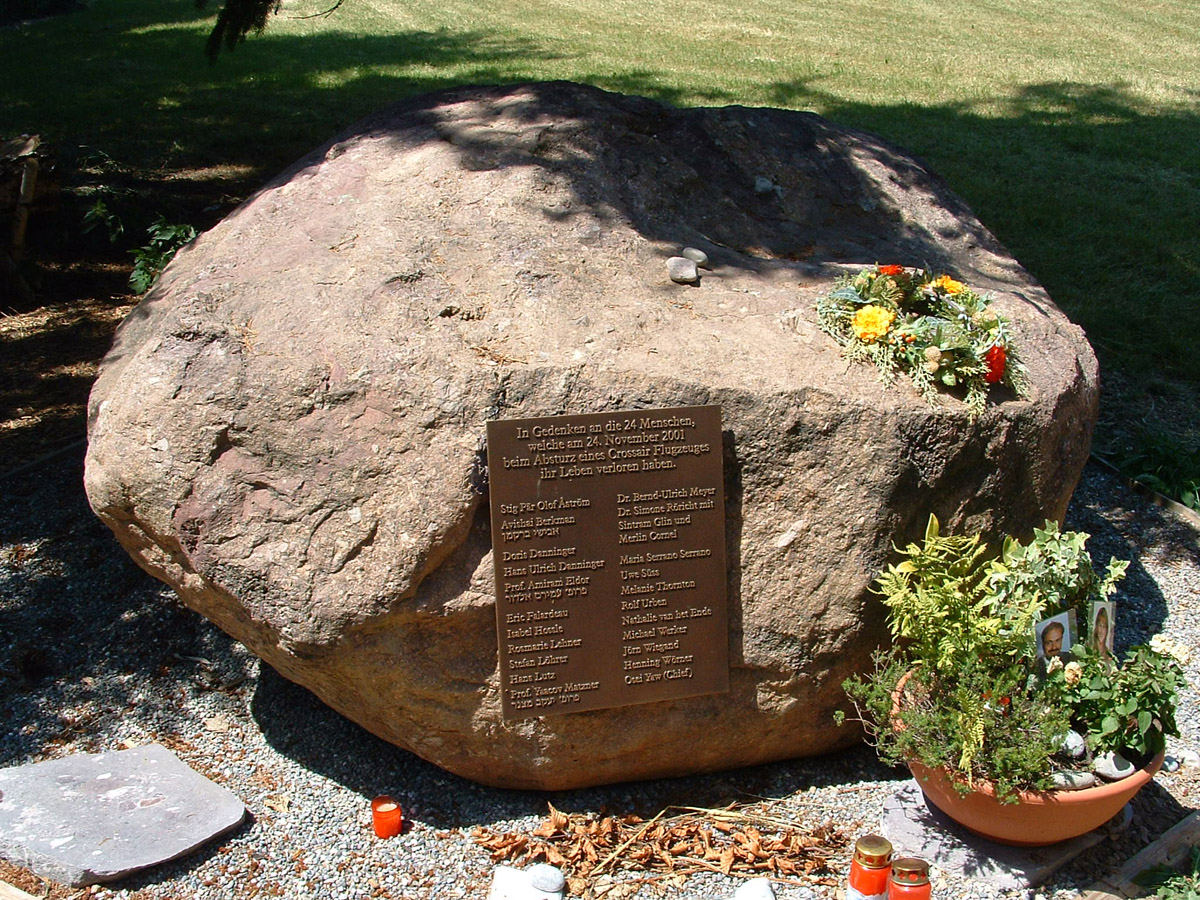
Memorial for those killed

While Captain Lutz was an experienced pilot, his competence soon came under close scrutiny by investigators from the Swiss Aircraft Accident Investigation Bureau (AAIB). The AAIB would conclude that the accident was a controlled flight into terrain (CFIT) caused by a series of pilot errors and navigation mistakes that led the plane off-course. This course deviation caused the plane to crash into a hilltop, 4.05 kilometres (2.52 mi; 2.19 nmi) short of and 150 metres (490 ft) north of its assigned landing strip, runway 28.

Flight 3597 had originally been scheduled to land on runway 14, the main landing runway at Zurich, which was equipped with an ILS system that provides vertical and lateral guidance to the runway. The CVR records Lutz and Löhrer discussing "the 14 approach" as well as Lutz's request that Löhrer call out the height when the plane reached 100 feet above DA (decision altitude – the altitude at which an immediate decision to land or initiate a missed approach must be made). However, Flight 3597 was behind schedule and would not reach Zurich until after 22:00 CET, necessitating a change to its landing plan. Zurich ATC, in order to comply with a new Swiss law designed to reduce airport noise from approaching aircraft over southern Germany in the late evening hours, redirected all flights on final approach to switch from the ILS-equipped runway 14 to the less-accurate VOR/DME-equipped runway 28. This runway change forced Lutz to abandon his planned ILS approach and required Löhrer to consult the Jeppesen charts for runway 28. The charts included a new set of approach parameters, of which the higher minimum descent altitude (MDA) was the most crucial piece of information.

The MDA states the minimum altitude in MSL to safely fly above any obstructions or terrain in the final approach flight-path before visual contact with the runway is made. Unlike a DA in a precision approach, an MDA requires that after crossing the Final Approach Fix, the pilot should descend and maintain MDA until the pilot reports that the runway is in sight, allowing the landing to safely be completed visually. In contrast to the ILS approach, which displays lateral and vertical position, the VOR/DME approach only shows the lateral position of the aircraft and its range to the runway. Due to increased azimuth error associated with the use of VORs and lack of vertical guidance (glide slope), the MDA is therefore often higher than a DA (Decision Altitude) for an ILS.

Although both pilots were based in Zurich and the CVR picks up Lutz's query to Löhrer about Löhrer's familiarity with "the 28 approach", which Löhrer confirmed he had, Lutz put the plane into an overly steep descent that brought Flight 3597 to MDA far too soon. When Löhrer reported the plane reaching 100 feet above MDA, the CVR records Lutz asking Löhrer, "Do we have ground contact?" Löhrer hesitated before replying, "Yes". However, flight simulators programmed with the time of day, terrain, and weather Lutz was facing at that time allowed investigators to determine that the only ground Lutz or Löhrer could see was the ground of the hilly terrain over which the plane was flying. Upon reaching MDA of 2,400 feet (730 m), Lutz declared that he had "ground contact" and would continue on, then deliberately descended the plane below the MDA without having the required visual contact with either the approach lights or the runway, a major piloting error that ultimately led to the crash. The fact that Löhrer made no attempt to prevent the continuation of the flight below the MDA also contributed to the crash.

Lutz made an additional error by not monitoring the DME as he made his approach; the CVR recorded Lutz's running narrative on nearly every move he made in the cockpit, but did not record any readout of the DME after a check, verified by Löhrer, at 11 km (6.8 mi) from runway 28. Moments before the crash, Lutz's running commentary indicated to investigators that he thought he was at or near 4.1 km (2.5 mi) from runway 28 because he said, "Someone said he saw the runway late here". Instead, Lutz was over 7.4 km (4.6 mi) from the runway, and could not possibly have seen the runway due to the presence of a hill below the MDA of 730 m (2,400 ft), which obscured his view. Just before the crash, the synthetic voice of the ground proximity warning system (GPWS) announced the radio altimeter reading 150 meters above ground. Lutz exclaimed, "Shit, two miles he said, he sees the runway!" A few seconds later Lutz said, "Two thousand" and then one second later the synthetic voice gave the "minimums" GPWS message, which was triggered by the radio altimeter reading at 90m. Even though Lutz finally realized that his inability to see the runway meant he needed to initiate a missed approach maneuver (called a "go-around"), his call for the go-around came too late; the plane's engines were not able to spool up fast enough to generate sufficient thrust to climb above the hill that had been obstructing his view, and the plane crashed into the hilltop at 22:06 CET.

== Final report ==
The AAIB report determined that Lutz had failed to perform correct navigation and landing procedures on previous occasions, but no action had been taken by Crossair to remove him from transporting passengers. Lutz had twice failed to upgrade his flight certifications to the more complex MD-83 due to insufficient comprehension of its computerized navigational systems. The report also documented Lutz's role in causing the total loss of a Crossair Saab 340 by retracting its landing gear while it was still on the apron, which led to Crossair relieving him of his flight instructing duties in 1991.

In spite of those demonstrated deficiencies, however, Crossair continued to allow Lutz to fly passengers (reportedly due to a shortage of qualified pilots), and he continued to demonstrate his overall deficiencies as a line pilot. These included a near-miss incident on final approach to Lugano Airport where Lutz came within 91 m (299 ft) of colliding with the shore of Lake Lugano during a dangerous 1200 m (3900 ft)-per-minute descent and a navigational error during a sightseeing tour over the Alps that took the flight far off its course to Sion. In this particular incident, Lutz missed his approach into Sion and circled over what he thought was Sion's airport for several minutes before passengers spotted road signs in Italian; the navigational error had taken them over the Great St Bernard Pass, and the airport they had been circling was in fact Aosta Valley Airport in Italy.

The final report of the AAIB states that other factors also contributed to the accident:

- The range of hills the plane crashed into was not marked in the Jeppesen approach chart used by the crew.
- Despite the hilly terrain surrounding it, the approach to runway 28 was not equipped with a Minimum Safe Altitude Warning (MSAW) system, which triggers an alarm if a minimum safe altitude is violated.
- Zurich Airport's means of determining visibility were inadequate for runway 28.
- The visual minimums at the time of the accident were actually inappropriate for using the standard approach to runway 28.
- An inexperienced air traffic controller was alone in the control tower. A more experienced controller might have allowed the flight to land on runway 14 because of the poor weather conditions.

== Dramatization ==
The hourlong Discovery Channel Canada / National Geographic TV series Mayday featured the crash in a Season 10 episode titled Cockpit Failure in 2011 and featured an interview of Peter Hoegenkamp, one of the survivors of the crash.

On 28 November 2021, the crash was featured in a German news report for the 20th anniversary of Melanie Thornton's death and featured an interview from Debby St. Maarten about how she survived and knowing that her group mates were dead during the events of the accident.

== See also ==
- Korean Air Flight 801
- Asiana Airlines Flight 733
- Air China Flight 129
- Thai Airways International Flight 311, a CFIT accident.
- Turkish Airlines Flight 634
- Henan Airlines Flight 8387
- TransAsia Airways Flight 222
- Alitalia Flight 404, another CFIT accident near Zurich
- American Airlines Flight 965
- Prinair Flight 277
- Air Inter Flight 148
- 2020 Calabasas helicopter crash
- Downeast Airlines Flight 46
