= Sing and Move (La La La Laaaa) =

"Sing and Move (La La La Laaa)"

Single by Banaroo

from the album Amazing
- Released: 30 December 2006
- Genre: Pop, dance-pop
- Length: 3:49
- Label: Universal

Banaroo singles chronology
"Uh Mamma" (2005)	"Sing and Move (La La La Laaa)" (2006)	"Ba Yonga Wamba" (2007)

Sing and Move (La La La Laaaa) is the second and last single from Banaroo's third album Amazing. It was released December 30, 2006.

In 2013, Banaroo released a new version of this song on their fifth studio album "Bubblegum World".

== Track listing ==
Maxi CD

1. "Sing and Move (La La La Laaaa)"
2. "Sing and Move (La La La Laaaa) (Extended Version)"
3. "Sing and Move (La La La Laaaa) (DB-Mix)"
4. "Sing and Move (La La La Laaaa) (Instrumental)"

== Charts ==
Chart (2006)	Peak position
Austria (Ö3 Austria Top 40)	51
Germany (GfK)	58
Switzerland (Schweizer Hitparade)	82
