= Victoria Chase =

Victoria Chase may refer to:

- a character from the sitcom Hot in Cleveland
- a character from The Collector (2009 film)
- a student at Max Caulfield's school in the video game Life Is Strange

== See also ==
- Vicky Chase
