= Uh Mamma =

Single by Banaroo

from the album Amazing
- B-side: "Call Me, Beep Me!"
- Released: 24 February 2006
- Genre: Pop, dance-pop
- Length: 3:16
- Label: Universal

Banaroo singles chronology
"Coming Home For Christmas" (2005)	"Uh Mamma" (2006)	"Sing and Move (La La La Laaaa)" (2006)

Uh Mamma is a song that was released February 24, 2006. It is the first single from Banaroo's third album Amazing.

== Formats and track listings ==
These are the formats and track listings of major single releases of "Uh Mamma".

Maxi CD

1. "Uh Mamma" – 3:14
2. "Uh Mamma (The Navigator RMX Vers 1.2)" - 4:20
3. "Uh Mamma (Retro Filter Mix)" - 4:21
4. "Uh Mamma (Instrumental)" - 3:12
5. "Call Me, Beep Me!" - 3:02

== Charts ==
=== Weekly charts ===
Chart (2006)	Peak position
Austria (Ö3 Austria Top 40)	3
Germany (GfK)	9
Switzerland (Schweizer Hitparade)	11

=== Year-end charts ===
Chart (2006)	Position
Austria (Ö3 Austria Top 40)	48
Germany (Official German Charts)	87
