= Ba Yonga Wamba =

Single by Banaroo

from the album Fly Away
- B-side: "Don't Leave"
- Released: 24 March 2007
- Genre: Pop, dance-pop
- Length: 3:27
- Label: Universal
- Songwriter(s): Carsten Wegener
- Producer(s): Carsten Wegener, Timo Hohnholz

Banaroo singles chronology
"Sing and Move (La La La Laaaa)" (2006)	"Ba Yonga Wamba" (2007)	"I'll Fly Away" (2007)

"Ba Yonga Wamba" is a dance-pop song performed by German group Banaroo. The song was written by Carsten Wegener and produced by Carsten Wegener and Timo Hohnholz for Banaroos fourth album Fly Away (2007). It was released as a single on 23 March 2007 in Germany.

== Track listing ==
CD Single 1

1. "Ba Yonga Wamba"
2. "Fast Dancehall Mix"
3. "Chilly Island Mix"
4. "Instrumental"
5. "Don't Leave"
6. "Ba Yonga Wamba (Video)"

CD Single 2

1. "Ba Yonga Wamba"
2. "Instrumental"

== Members ==
- Robbert "Bobby" Dessauvagie
- Stefanie "Steffy" Dreyer
- Kathrin "Cat" Geibler
- Vittorio "Vito" Magro

== Charts ==
Chart (2007)	Peak position
Austria (Ö3 Austria Top 40)	28
Germany (GfK)	30
Switzerland (Schweizer Hitparade)	86
