= Space Cowboy (Banaroo song) =

Single by Banaroo

from the album Banaroo's World
- Released: 22 May 2005
- Genre: Pop, dance-pop
- Length: 3:49
- Label: Universal
- Songwriter(s): Thorsten Brötzmann, Terri Bjerre, Ivo Moring
- Producer(s): Thorsten Brötzmann

Banaroo singles chronology
"Dubi Dam Dam" (2005)	"Space Cowboy" (2005)	"Coming Home For Christmas" (2005)

"Space Cowboy" is a song by German pop group Banaroo. In 2013, they released a new version of this song on their fifth studio album Bubblegum World.

== Formats and track listings ==
These are the formats and track listings of major single releases of "Space Cowboy."

Maxi CD

1. "Space Cowboy (Radio Edit)" - 3:49
2. "Space Cowboy (Extended Version)" - 5:31
3. "Space Cowboy (Remix)" - 5:03
4. "Space Cowboy (Instrumental)" - 3:47
5. "Space Cowboy (Video)" - 3:49

== Charts ==
=== Weekly charts ===
Chart (2005)	Peak position
Austria (Ö3 Austria Top 40)	12
Germany (GfK)	5
Switzerland (Schweizer Hitparade)	17

=== Year-end charts ===
Chart (2005)	Position
Germany (Official German Charts)	95
