= The Rigga-Ding-Dong-Song =

1999 song by Passion Fruit

Single by Passion Fruit

from the album Spanglish Love Affairs
- Language: Spanish; English
- Released: 7 June 1999
- Recorded: 1999
- Genre: Eurodance
- Length: 3:25
- Label: X-Cell / Sony Music
- Songwriters: Mark Nissen; Hartmut Krech; Ronny Ronaldo; Antonio Berardi; Kenneth Clemmons
- Producers: Mark Nissen; Hartmut Krech

Passion Fruit singles chronology
"The Rigga-Ding-Dong-Song" (1999)	"Wonderland" (2000)

Music video
- "Carrera" on YouTube

"The Rigga Ding Dong Song" is the debut single by the German Eurodance group Passion Fruit, released in 1999. The song is the group's most successful hit, reaching the top 10 in several countries, including Germany, Austria and Switzerland and the top 20 in the Netherlands. The first generation line-up can be seen in the single's cover sleeve and music video. The vocals and rapping verses for the song were done by Leticia Spormann and Kenneth Clemmons.

== Track listing ==
CD single

1. "The Rigga-Ding-Dong-Song" (Radio Mix) - 3:25
2. "The Rigga-Ding-Dong-Song" (Extended Mix) - 5:12

CD maxi (Sony)

1. "The Rigga-Ding-Dong-Song" (Radio Mix) - 3:25
2. "The Rigga-Ding-Dong-Song" (Extended Mix) - 5:12
3. "The Rigga-Ding-Dong-Song" (Plastic Bubble Mix) - 5:03
4. "The Rigga-Ding-Dong-Song" (Munsta Groove Mix) - 5:41

12" (Radikal)

1. "The Rigga-Ding-Dong-Song" (Extended Mix) - 5:12
2. "The Rigga-Ding-Dong-Song" (Radio Mix) - 3:25
3. "The Rigga-Ding-Dong-Song" (Plastic Bubble Mix) - 5:03
4. "The Rigga-Ding-Dong-Song" (Munsta Groove Mix) - 5:41

== Charts ==
=== Weekly charts ===
Chart (1999)	Peak position
Australia (ARIA)	85
Austria (Ö3 Austria Top 40)	9
Netherlands (Single Top 100)	15
Germany (GfK Entertainment charts)	9
Switzerland (Schweizer Hitparade)	7

=== Year-end charts ===
Chart (1999)	Position
Netherlands (Dutch Top 40)	128

== Cherona version ==
"Rigga-Ding-Dong-Song"

Single by Cherona

from the album Sound of Cherona
- Released: 10 July 2009
- Recorded: 2009
- Genre: Dance-pop
- Length: 3:27
- Label: Columbia
- Songwriters: Mark Nissen; Hartmut Krech; Ronny Ronaldo; Antonio Berardi; Kenneth Clemmons
- Producer: Elephant Music

Cherona singles chronology
"Ching Chang Chong" (2009)	"Rigga-Ding-Dong-Song" (2009)	"Dragonfly" (2009)

Music video
- "Rigga-Ding-Dong-Song" on YouTube

Exactly ten years to the Passion Fruit release, the German pop group Cherona released its version titled "Rigga-Ding-Dong-Song" in 2009 dropping the definite article "the" from the title. The Cherona version on Columbia Records accompanied by a music video became a minor hit in Europe, particularly Germany (peak #56) and Austria (peak #48). The song appeared on the band's 2009 album Sound of Cherona.

Charts

Chart (2009)	Peak position
Austria (Ö3 Austria Top 40)	48
Germany (GfK Entertainment charts)	56

== Leticia cover ==
"The Rigga Ding Dong Song"

Single by Leticia
- Released: 3 April 2010
- Recorded: 2010
- Genre: Dance-pop
- Length: 3:25
- Label: No-Wa
- Songwriters: Mark Nissen; Hartmut Krech; Ronny Ronaldo; Antonio Berardi; Kenneth Clemmons
- Producer: Robert Meister

In 2010, Cuban-German singer Leticia (a.k.a. Leticia Spormann) released her own remixed revamped version with new arrangement under the title "The Rigga Digga Ding Song" with her record label NoWa. The single cover says "The voice of Passion Fruit" as she was credited as lead vocalist on the Passion Fruit released in 1999. The track was produced by Robert Meister.

Track listing

1. "The Rigga Digga Ding Dong Song" (Radio-Mix) - 3:25
2. "The Rigga Digga Ding Dong Song" (Extended Dance Mix) - 5:48
