= Fly Away (Banaroo album) =

Studio album by Banaroo
- Released: July 4, 2007
- Recorded: 2007
- Genre: Pop, dance-pop
- Label: Universal

Banaroo chronology
Amazing (2006)	Fly Away (2007)	The Best Of Banaroo (2007)

Fly Away is the fourth studio album by the German group Banaroo. It's also the final album recorded with original Banaroo members Bobby, Steffy, Vito, and Cat, before the group disbanded in 2008.

== Release ==
Banaroo's fourth studio album was released on February 27, 2007, in German-speaking countries. The record made a chart entry on rank 44 in Germany. For two weeks, the CD was able to hold in the album charts. In Austria, the album made it to rank 24 and was able to hold seven weeks in the hit parade. In Switzerland, the album reached position 86 for one week.

== Single's ==
Ba Yonga Wamba

The song "Ba Yonga Wamba" was released on March 23, 2007, on the market. He placed 30th in the German single charts and was able to stay there for nine weeks. In Austria, the piece ranked 28th "Ba Yonga Wamba" fell here after five weeks from the chart standings. In Switzerland, the song ranked 86th. The song fell out of the hit parade after a week. Robert Bröllochs was the director of the shooting of the music video and also the producer. The video was taken on a day in Krausnick . The cameraman was Tobias Rupp. The personal assistant of the director was Sabine Birkhahn, production manager Matthias Sperle. [16] The video can also be viewed on the single. This appeared as a 5-inch single. It contains the original song and a karaoke version of the piece.

I'll Fly Away

As the last single from Banaroo released "I'll Fly Away" on May 4, 2007. The song reached number 84 in the German single charts. The song stayed on the charts for seven weeks. In Austria and in Switzerland, the track managed no entry into the charts. Mario Spiegel directed the shooting of the music video. The production company was titan film . The last clip of the band was cut by Aida Malakooty, who did this during her training. The piece was produced by Alex Geringas and Ivo Moring, who also wrote the lyrics. The single was released as a 2-track single, which also contains a karaoke version in addition to the album version of the song.

== Track listing ==
1. "Ba Yonga Wamba" - 3:28
2. "I'll Fly Away" - 3:21
3. "Summer In The Sun" - 3:34
4. "Be My Satellite" - 3:20
5. "Superhero" - 3:17
6. "Radio Of Love" - 3:33
7. "Do You Believe" - 3:22
8. "Uuh La La" - 3:07
9. "Sweet Sensation" - 3:40
10. "I Love You, You Love Me" - 3:10
11. "Hong Kong Song" - 3:26
12. "Oriental Dream" - 3:20
13. "Don't Leave" - 4:21

== Note ==
This was the last release from the original Banaroo's Members
