= Amazing (Banaroo album) =

Studio album by Banaroo
- Released: 24 March 2006
- Recorded: 2006
- Genre: Pop, dance-pop
- Label: Universal
- Producer: Carsten Wegener, Timo Hohnholz

Banaroo chronology
Christmas World (2005)	Amazing (2006)	Fly Away (2007)

Singles from Amazing
- 1. "Uh Mamma"; 2. "Sing and Move (La La La Laaaa)"

Amazing is the third studio album by German pop group Banaroo. It was released on March 24, 2006 and awarded gold in Austria . It could solde more than 10,000 copies.

== Production ==
The production of "Amazing" involved several producers and composers. For example, "Uh Mamma", "Bana Me Bana You" and "Bang Bang Boomerang" were composed by Carsten Wegener and Timo Hohnholz. Dieter Bohlen produced the song "Be My Boyfriend". Dietmar Hamann and Astrid Lange wrote the play "Can not Get Out of My Mind". The song "Mamacita" was written by Mike Linceton and Bernd Meinunger . At "Circles" five composers were at work. These were Niko Tonidis, Fabian Marx, Tom Ströbele, Uwe Sessler and Uli Wenzel. And also for the single-released song "Sing and Move (La La La Laaaa)" four songwriters were committed. Holger Obenaus, Boris Schmidt, Norbert Zucker and Cynthia Newman wrote the lyrics. Christian Geller, who already produced all four studio albums for beFour, was also responsible for the song "Miss Your Kiss". Carsten Wegener composed the title "America". For two of the twelve songs Mary S. Applegate and Mike Linceton were responsible. These were the pieces "Sailor Dance" and "Heya Comanchero".

== Single's ==
Uh Mamma

As the first single release of the band's third album, the title "Uh Mamma" was released on February 24, 2006 in Germany, Austria and Switzerland. The song made it to ninth place in Germany and spent twelve weeks in the German single charts. In Austria "Uh Mamma" was able to assert itself in third place. The song was in the charts for 16 weeks. In Switzerland, the maxi single went up to eleventh place and was on the charts for eleven weeks. On the single of the song is next to the instrumental version also the bonus song "Call Me, Beep Me!" To hear. This is the title song of the animated cartoon Kim Possible . The song was written by Andrew George Gabriel and Cory Charles Lerios and produced by Christian Geller. [17] Mark Feuerstake directed the music video . The contractor is the Mark Feuerstake film production . Matthias Heuser was the cameraman. The video was shot using blue screen technology in a German studio.

Sing and Move (La La La Laaaa)

The following single release from the album was "Sing and Move (La La La Laaaa)". This appeared on June 2, 2006 in German-speaking countries and placed in Germany in 58th place. It was able to hold nine weeks in the charts. The piece placed 45th in the charts in Austria and stayed here for seven weeks. Place 82 reached the produced piece in Switzerland. It disappeared after two weeks from the hit parade. [19] The film was directed by Robert Bröllochs. This video shoot was a production by Camelot Filmproduktionen . Joe Dyer took all the scenes to the lighting during the shoot was Guido Theis responsible. Producer of the video is Michael Bröllochs, production manager Matthias Sperle. The film was filmed on a day in Mannheim.

== Track listing ==
1. "Uh Mamma" - 3:14
2. "Bana Me Bana You" - 3:21
3. "Sailor Dance" - 3:33
4. "Bang Bang Boomerang" - 3:13
5. "Be My Boyfriend" - 3:34
6. "Can't Get You Out Of My Mind" - 3:48
7. "Miss Your Kiss" - 3:21
8. "Sing and Move (La La La Laaaa)" - 3:48
9. "Circles" - 3:29
10. "Heya Comanchero" - 4:22
11. "America" - 3:25
12. "Mamacita" - 4:08

Extra:

- Uh Mamma (Videoclip)
- Call Me, Beep Me! (The Kim Possible Song) (Videoclip)

== Charts and certifications ==
=== Weekly charts ===
Chart (2006)	Peak position
Austrian Albums (Ö3 Austria)	2
German Albums (Offizielle Top 100)	6
Swiss Albums (Schweizer Hitparade)	25

=== Year-end charts ===
Chart (2006)	Position
Austrian Albums (Ö3 Austria)	39
German Albums (Offizielle Top 100)	69

=== Certifications ===
Country	Sales	Certification
Austria	10,000	Gold
