= Christmas World =

Studio album by Banaroo
- Released: 25 November 2005
- Recorded: 2005
- Genres: Pop, dance-pop
- Label: Universal
- Producers: Carsten Wegener, Timo Hohnholz

Banaroo chronology
Banaroo's World (2005)	Christmas World (2005)	Amazing (2006)

Singles from Christmas World
- 1. "Coming Home For Christmas"

Christmas World is the First and only Christmas and second overall studio album by the German group Banaroo.

== Release ==
The first publication of the plate took place on 25 November 2005.

=== Re-release ===
In addition, the album appeared again on November 17, 2006. This has a varied track list. In addition, the two music videos are omitted. Another title is the bonus song Song of Joy.

== Single's ==
Coming Home for Christmas

As the first and only single release of the album Christmas World, the Christmas song Coming Home for Christmas was released on November 11, 2005 in Germany, Austria and Switzerland. The song made it to eighth place in Germany and stayed here for 15 weeks in the Media Control single charts. In Austria, the song made it to position five; stayed here for seven weeks. In Switzerland, the piece took ninth place and was nine weeks here in the charts. The production of the film was directed by Mark Feuerstake for his production company Mark Feuerstake Filmproduktion. Tatjana Richartz was the make-up artist. The camera assistant was Marco Dreckmann. In the clip, all four band members are first seen sitting separately at a window. Later, they drive a track through the snowy landscape and save first an old man and then a dog left alone. This should be the joy of Christmas and the love of living beings. The music video ends with a Christmas party. In addition, a second version of the video was shot; this time with the TOGGO 5 Stars.

The single appeared in two different versions. The 2-track version includes the video in addition to the song. The cover picture consists of a green Christmas ball; in its middle is the logo of the band. The standard single also contains some remixes of the title. The cover, like that of the album, was created by Frank Schemmann. There, the four band members stand side by side against a blue background. In 2009, Vicky Chassioti ( Cherona ) covered the song and released it as their debut solo single on November 20, 2009. In December 2017, Jamie-Lee Kriewitz released the song.

== Track listing ==
1. Coming Home For Christmas (3:23)
2. Bling Bling Here, Bling Bling There (3:15)
3. Christmas Time (3:39)
4. Feliz Navidad (4:00)
5. Let's Go For A Ride (2:40)
6. Sweet Inspiration (3:09)
7. Only Love (3:13)
8. X-Mas Toy (3:07)
9. Let's Keep The Fire Burning (3:01)
10. You're My Guardian Angel (3:05)
11. The Miracle Of You (3:04)
12. Light The Fire (3:07)
13. You're The One And Only (2:35)
14. Winter Wonderland (3:24)
15. White Christmas (3:36)
16. Sleep My Baby Tonight (4:04)

== Charts ==
=== Weekly charts ===
Chart (2005–06)	Peak position
Austrian Albums (Ö3 Austria)	5
German Albums (Offizielle Top 100)	12
Swiss Albums (Schweizer Hitparade)	26

=== Year-end charts ===
Chart (2006)	Position
Austrian Albums (Ö3 Austria)	71
