= Turkish Airlines Flight 634 =

2003 aviation accident

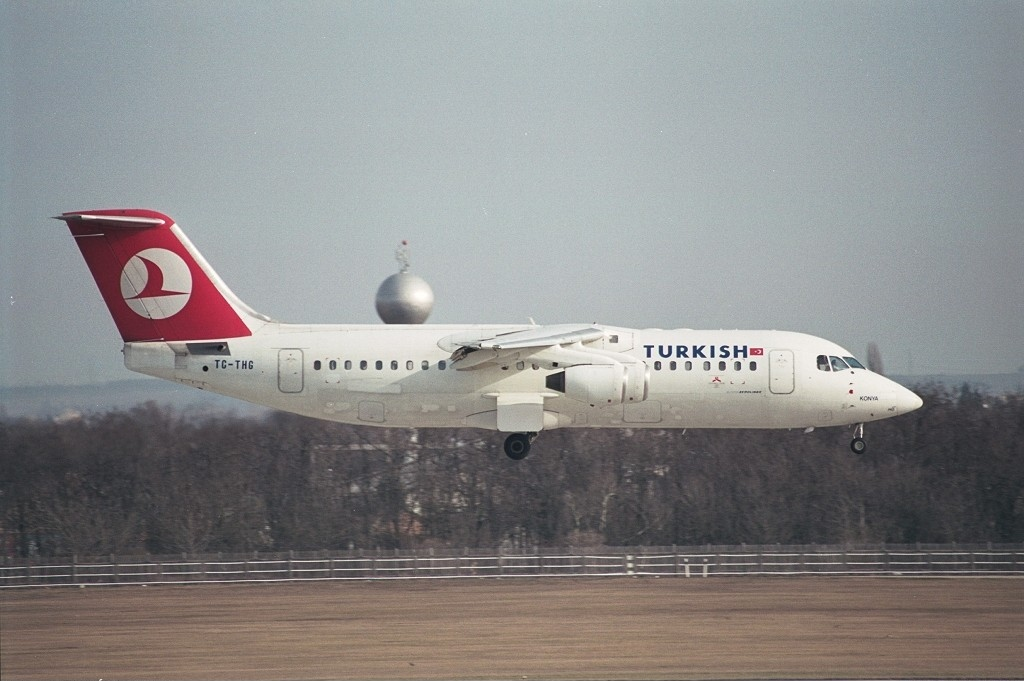
- TC-THG, the aircraft involved in the accident, February 2001.

Accident
- Date: 8 January 2003
- Summary: Controlled flight into terrain in poor visibility due to pilot error
- Site: Diyarbakır Airport, Diyarbakır, Turkey

Aircraft
- Aircraft type: Avro RJ100
- Aircraft name: Konya
- Operator: Turkish Airlines
- IATA flight No.: TK634
- ICAO flight No.: THY634
- Call sign: TURKISH 634
- Registration: TC-THG
- Flight origin: Istanbul Atatürk Airport, Istanbul, Turkey
- Destination: Diyarbakır Airport, Diyarbakır, Turkey
- Occupants: 80
- Passengers: 75
- Crew: 5
- Fatalities: 75
- Injuries: 5
- Survivors: 5

Location of departure (LTBA) and destination (LTCC) airports

Turkish Airlines Flight 634 was a scheduled domestic passenger flight from Istanbul Atatürk Airport to Diyarbakır Airport in southeastern Turkey. On 8 January 2003 at 20:19 EET (18:19 UTC), the aircraft operating the flight, a British Aerospace Avro RJ100, struck the ground on final approach approximately 900 metres (3,000 ft) short of the runway threshold during inclement weather conditions. In the following collision with a slope, a post-crash fire broke out, killing 75 of the 80 occupants, including the entire crew. This is the deadliest aviation accident to involve the BAe 146.

== Background ==
=== Aircraft ===
The aircraft involved in the accident was a 1993-built British Aerospace Avro RJ100 equipped with four Lycoming LF507-1F turbofan engines and was delivered to the airline in March 1994. At the time of the accident, it had accumulated a total of 20,000 flight hours in a total of 17,000 flight cycles.

=== Crew and passengers ===
Nationality	Crew	Passengers	Total
Turkey	5	25	30
France	0	45	45
United Kingdom	0	3	3
Germany	0	2	2
Total	5	75	80

The aircrew consisted of two pilots and three flight attendants. Captain Alaaddin Yunak, a former Turkish Air Force pilot aged 34, had joined Turkish Airlines in 1995 and had accumulated 6,309 flight hours in total. First Officer Ismail Altug Ulusu, aged 33, had joined Turkish Airlines in 1998 and had since clocked 2,052 flight hours in total. The flight was carrying 75 passengers. Of the 80 people on board, initially six passengers survived but one passenger later succumbed to his injuries.

== Accident ==
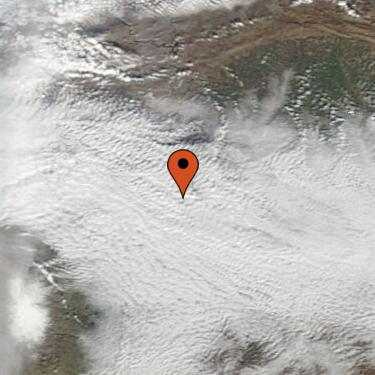
Conditions over Turkey on the day of the crash with Diyarbakır Airport pinpointed

Flight 634 departed Istanbul Atatürk Airport at 18:43 EET (16:43 UTC) for the nearly two-hour flight to Diyarbakır in southeastern Turkey. Approximately one hour into the flight and 40 nautical miles (70 km) off the destination airport, the crew contacted Diyarbakir Airport's approach control, which cleared the flight to approach the airport from the south for runway 34 using VHF omnidirectional range – a type of short-range radio navigation system which enables aircraft with a receiving unit to determine their position and stay on course – and instructed the crew to descend to 9,000 feet (2,700 m). The weather report relayed to crew by the controller stated no winds and visibility of 3,500 metres (1.9 nmi).

When the flight was 8 nautical miles (15 km) from runway 34 and at an altitude of 5,000 feet (1,500 m), air traffic control instructed the crew to continue the approach and report as soon as they had established visual contact with the runway. The crew acknowledged the call and prepared the aircraft for landing, deploying the landing gear and extending the flaps. Continuing to descend, the aircraft reached its minimum descent altitude (MDA) of 2,800 feet (850 m) – the lowest altitude to which descent is authorized on final approach or during circle-to-land maneuvering in execution of a standard instrument approach procedure where no electronic glideslope is provided (the airport was not equipped with an instrument landing system) – but both pilots said that they still had no visual reference to the runway or its approach lighting system because of the thick fog. One pilot discerned some lights in the distance but was not sure what exactly they belonged to.

Nonetheless, violating standard procedures, the captain decided to continue the approach to as close as 1 mile (1.6 km) to the runway and descended further to 500 feet (150 m) and beyond, well below the MDA. At 1 mile (1.6 km) off the threshold of the runway and at an altitude of 200 feet (60 m) (which in this case constituted the decision height), the ground proximity warning system (GPWS) started to trigger aural alarms. Eight seconds later, the crew decided to abort the landing and initiated a go-around, but before being able to execute the command, the airplane struck the ground with the undersurface of the fuselage and the landing gear at 20:19 EET (18:19 UTC), 900 metres (3,000 ft) off the threshold of runway 34 and 30 metres (100 ft) off the approach lights at a speed of around 131 knots (243 km/h; 151 mph).

The aircraft slid on the ground for about 200 metres (660 ft) while starting to disintegrate. Eventually, it hit a slope, broke up into three major pieces, exploded and caught fire; most of the bodies and parts of the wreckage were burnt. The debris was spread out in an area of about 800 square metres (8,600 sq ft).

The impact instantly killed both pilots, the three flight attendants and 69 of the 75 passengers. Six passengers survived, one of whom however later succumbed to his injuries in hospital.

=== Immediate response ===
Since the crash site was within the boundaries of the airport, search and rescue teams of the 2nd Tactical Air Force Command stationed at Diyarbakır Air Base, which included two helicopters, were quickly deployed. However, neither helicopter was able to participate in the rescue efforts because of the dense fog, which, according to eyewitness accounts, was below one metre at times. Numerous firetrucks and ambulances were deployed to extinguish the post-crash fire and rescue the victims.

== Investigation ==
The investigation into the accident was carried out by Turkey's Directorate General of Civil Aviation (DGCA). Both flight recorders – the cockpit voice recorder (CVR) and the flight data recorder (FDR) – were found intact and were sent to Turkish Airlines' laboratories for analysis.

According to records, Captain Yunak and First Officer Ulusu were found to have been properly trained, qualified and experienced. They had sufficient rest before reporting for duty on the day of the accident. Drug and alcohol tests returned negative results.

Investigators also turned their attention to the aircraft, but were not able to detect any abnormalities. All maintenance checks were completed properly. Close examination of the engines revealed that they were operating normally at the time of the accident. The aircraft was properly configured for landing – the flaps and the landing gear were extended properly and the altimeter was set correctly – and the ground proximity warning system (GPWS) also produced alarms which could be easily heard on the CVR recordings.

Search and rescue teams who immediately rushed to the site to respond to the crash reported thick fog at the crash site and complained about the lack of visibility which according to their account was as low as 1 metre (3 ft) at times. This clearly contradicts the weather report the air traffic controller at Diyarbakır Airport had relayed to the crew minutes before the crash. According to them, the fire could not even be seen until arriving on the scene.

Analysis of the FDR and the CVR revealed that at the moment the aircraft struck the ground it was at a heading of 339° (north-northwest, in line with the runway centerline) and 900 metres (3,000 ft) short of the threshold of runway 34 at a positive pitch angle of five degrees (which corresponds to a slight nose-up position). The autopilot was found to have been activated up until a short time before the accident.

=== Final report ===
The investigation was completed around two years later in April 2005 and concluded that:

1. The crew failed to properly respond to the warnings produced by the GPWS and instead insisted on landing despite insufficient visual reference to the runway and its environment
2. Thick fog contributed to the cause of the accident.

The Turkish Airline Pilots Association stated that an instrument landing system might have prevented the accident.

== See also ==
- Crossair Flight 3597 – An Avro RJ100 which crashed in similar circumstances.
- Smolensk air disaster – A crash of the Polish presidential airplane while the pilots were trying to establish a visual contact in an unfamiliar airport in thick fog.
- Air China Flight 129
- American Airlines Flight 965
- Trigana Air Flight 267
- Santa Bárbara Airlines Flight 518
- Alitalia Flight 404
- Pakistan International Airlines Flight 268
- Thai Airways International Flight 311
- Air Midwest Flight 5481 – another aviation accident that occurred the same day
