= Banaroo =

German band

- Banaroo Logo

Background information
- Origin: Stuttgart, Germany; Hamburg, Germany; Monster, Netherlands; Saint-Nicolas, Belgium
- Genres: Europop; bubblegum pop; Eurodance
- Years active: 2005–2008; 2013
- Label: Universal Music
- Past members: Robbert "Bobby" Dessauvagie (2005–2008); Stefanie "Steffy" Dreyer (2005–2008); Kathrin "Cat" Geißler (2005–2008); Vittorio "Vito" Magro (2005–2008); Doro Farkas (2013); Alvin Philipps (2013); Laura Luppino (2013); Daniel Langer (2013)
- Website: www.banaroo.de

Banaroo was a German pop group active from 2005 to 2008 and then 2013 with a new line up. They had several successful singles in countries including Germany, Austria and Switzerland.

The first line-up consisted of Robbert "Bobby" Dessauvagie, Vittorio "Vito" Magro, Stefanie "Steffy" Dreyer and Kathrin "Cat" Geißler and was active from 2005 until they disbanded in 2008. In 2013, the group was relaunched with new members Doro Farkas, Laura Luppino, Alvin Philipps and Daniel Langer. The second line-up disbanded on November 6, 2013.

== History ==
Banaroo: The Star Diary

Following the continued success of casting shows on German television, Super RTL designed the Star Diary as a new television format. The spiritual father of the project is Michael Bolte, member of the marketing department of Super RTL. Based on the concept of pop stars, the new program was to accompany a newly assembled pop band documentary during their first career steps and thus provide an authentic view of the initial work of a band. In contrast to other formats, however, all interactive elements for the continuous selection of the casting participants were dispensed with.

The casting took place before the beginning of filming in close cooperation with the record company Na Klar! Records Hennef / Berlin. So-called high potentials were to be found, young artists who were still at the beginning of their careers, but who were already able to refer their first experiences to audiences in the field of song and dance. From the casting Dessauvagie, Dreyer, Geissler and Magro emerged as participants in the series. Banaroo was chosen as the name of the band. According to Vittorio Magro, he goes back to his own experience during a visit to the zoo. When a small child asked him if kangaroos also eat bananas, he replied, "If kangaroos were to eat bananas, they would have to be called banaroos ..."

With the broadcast of Banaroo: The Star Diary began Super RTL on April 18, 2005. By July 10, 2005, at 10:05 pm, a total of 84 chapters were shown daily. The series was produced by Mark Feuerstake, who also directed. For the filming, the four band members moved into a shared flat in Cologne . In the five-minute episodes, viewers were able to follow all of Banaroo's career-building activities, such as voice training and choreography, but also gained private insights. Each Saturday morning, Super RTL broadcast a 20-minute week summary.

The program has become the most successful own production of Super RTL since the existence of the transmitter. Every evening, an average of 590,000 viewers (market share: 2.9%) followed the series, in the peak even up to 800,000 spectators. In the target group of 3- to 13-year-olds, which is relevant to Super RTL, The Star Diary had on average 370,000 viewers and a market share of 30.2%.

== 2005 ==
=== Debut single & Banaroo's World ===
Five weeks after the first episode came on May 23, 2005, the debut single Dubi Dam Dam on the market. In addition to a remix, also included the title song of the series: Make You See the Stars. The single was produced by Carsten Wegener and Timo Hohnholz, who were also responsible for essential parts of the following albums. And as with other cast bands before, the strategy at Banaroo was to use constantly available television presence as a marketing tool. The song immediately reached second place in Germany in the singles charts. He was similarly successful in Austria and Switzerland.

The debut album Banaroo's World released five weeks later on 20, June 2005, was also a great sales success. it debuted 5th and rose to number 1 in August 2005. In Austria, the album debuted at number 1 and stayed there for 7 weeks.

Shortly thereafter, the second single produced by Thorsten Brötzmann was decoupled from the album. Space Cowboy largely confirmed the success of the first single and reached the top five in Germany. It was certified platinum in Germany, and certified Gold in both Austria and Switzerland.

At the end of September 2005, Banaroo received a gold record in Germany for more than 150,000 singles sold and a platinum record for more than 200,000 albums sold. Also in Switzerland and in Austria single and album were each awarded gold.

For their success, Banaroo was nominated as best newcomer both for the pop music award Comet of the German music broadcaster VIVA and for the Echo.

After the expiry of the TV series came on August 8, 2005, the DVD Banaroo - The Movie! on the market. In addition to the three music videos for Dubi Dam Dam, Space Cowboy and Make You See the Stars and five other live recordings, the DVD contains three non-broadcast episodes of the Star Diary . They show a visit of the band in the studio of the production company and a joint trip to the Rhine. As bonus material Outtakes of the series were packed on the DVD.

=== Christmas World ===
Just five months after the debut, the follow-up album was released on 25 November 2005 under the title Christmas World, a compilation of well-known Christmas carols, which were re-recorded by Banaroo. The album was again produced by Carsten Wegener and Timo Hohnholz.

The only newly composed song on the album was Coming Home for Christmas, which was previously released as a single. Not least thanks to targeted marketing campaigns - the title was selected as the official song of the RTL charity campaign ChariTree - reached the single in all German-speaking countries again the top-10.

Banaroo returned on November 11, 2005, with their third single, "Coming Home For Christmas". It failed to do as well as previous singles, however it still made the top ten in Germany, Austria and Switzerland.

On 25 November 2005, Banaroo released their second album, Christmas World. The album, despite its name, did not include just Christmas songs. The album debuted at #12 on the German charts on December 9, 2005.

== 2006 ==
=== Amazing ===
In February 2006, Banaroo returned with their fourth single "Uh Mamma". It charted in the top ten in Germany and Austria. In Switzerland it reached #11.

Just in time for Super RTL to start Yoomiii 's next Star Diary band, Banaroo released another album on March 24, 2006, the third in nine months. Musically, it largely tied to the debut album. It charted at #2 in Austria and was certified Gold. It charted at #6 in Germany and #25 in Switzerland.

Five of the twelve songs came again from the producer team Wegener / Hohnholz, a track headed Dieter Bohlen . As an extra, the band re-recorded the title song of the cartoon series Kim Possible - originally by Christina Milian . The young fanbase remained loyal to Banaroo. Album and the pre-decoupled single Uh Mamma again climbed in the charts of all three German-speaking countries on the front seats. In Austria, the album reached gold status four weeks after its release.

"Sing and Move (La La La Laaaa)" was the second and last single from the album. It was released June 27, 2006. It failed to match the success of previous singles, not making the top twenty and only reaching a peak of #51.

on November 17, 2006, Banaroo' re-released the Christmas Album titled 'Christmas World' This has a varied track list. In addition, the two music videos are omitted. Another title is the bonus song Song of Joy.

== 2007 ==
=== Fly Away ===
Having been away from the music scene for nearly nine months, Banaroo returned with "Ba Yonga Wamba". It was released March 23, 2007, and also failed to match the success of previous singles, although it did chart higher than "Sing and Move (La La La Laaaa)". The song also managed to chart in the top thirty in Germany and Austria.

They released their seventh and last single "I'll Fly Away" on May 4, 2007. It only reached number 84 in Germany.

Banaroo released their fourth and last studio album Fly Away on July 4, 2007. Failing to do as well as previous albums, it still charted at #24 in Germany. It was promoted by the broadcaster Nickelodeon, In the period around the release date Banaroo was used as a jury in the Nick production Nick Talent . The winner of the show, Naomi Walz, was allowed to shoot the video clip for the single I'll Fly Away with Banaroo.

=== The Best of Banaroo ===
On October 19, 2007, Banaroo released their greatest hits album The Best of Banaroo featuring 18 songs from their four albums, plus two new songs. Because the album failed to chart the band lost their record deal.

== 2008: Disbandment ==
After the release of The Best of Banaroo, Banaroo disappeared from the music world. It was confirmed in 2008 that they would not be releasing any more music and that they had broken up.

== 2013: Second Line-up & Comeback ==
In 2013, Na Klar! held a casting in Germany to pick four new members for Banaroo, the reason being that the original members are too busy with their personal lives and other personal reasons. After the auditions completed, the members chosen as the new members were Doro Farkas, Laura Luppino, Alvin Philipps, and Daniel Langer. While still being under Na Klar! and Sony Music, they also joined forces with Villa Productions for their comeback.

The first new single was a new version of Banaroo's most popular song, "Dubi Dam Dam", released as "Dubi Dam Dam (2013 Version)". It was released as a single on May 17, 2013, and includes two versions of the song. Following its release, Banaroo also announced their new album called "Bubblegum World" and revealed its cover art and track list. "Bubblegum World" is a tribute album to the bubblegum genre and some of its most popular artists. Banaroo also started touring with the Toggo Tour in May, performing many of the songs that would be included on "Bubblegum World".

Their fifth studio album "Bubblegum World" was released on June 7, 2013. They released a second single from the album, a remake of another popular Banaroo song called "Space Cowboy" on June 21, 2013. Banaroo also announced a contest for the summer, where the winner would get to meet Banaroo and spend the day with them in the studio. Despite the fair amount of promotion for the releases and constant touring, their album and singles from the album failed to chart anywhere.

=== Second Disbandment & Post-disbandment ===
Banaroo continued to tour until their final tour date on October 7. After completing their tour, Banaroo announced a new concert date, which took place on October 17. Following Banaroo's last Facebook update on October 24, things became quiet around Banaroo. On November 6, Laura Luppino announced on her official Facebook page that Banaroo would be disbanding a second time, as the members had different ideas for Banaroo's future and that it would be impossible for them to continue together. The other members, as well as their producer Oliver DeVille, have confirmed the disbandment. The management of Banaroo has yet to comment on the sudden disbandment publicly, however, their producer has mentioned the disbandment took place when Doro and Alvin decided to leave Banaroo and pursue other aspects in the entertainment industry. It was also confirmed that they were planning to release a Christmas single in December, however, it was never recorded.

Following the disbandment, former members Alvin and Doro confirmed that they would soon debut as a duo, however, they have yet to make a debut as a duo. Laura Luppino has moved forward as a soloist, still working under Villa Productions. In 2014, Laura competed in the pre-selections for Eurovision, representing Switzerland with "The Energy Of Love (In Your Eyes)". As part of a contest, she gave away a signed copy of Banaroo's "Bubblegum World" album.

Doro Farkas has since gone solo as well and has begun releasing solo material, meaning the duo project planned with Alvin Philipps may not be happening. Alvin Phillips has moved forward recently, continuing as a model and also as an actor. Daniel Langer, however, hasn't been active in the entertainment industry since Banaroo's disbandment. He has decided to continue with his personal life and it is unknown if he has any plans to return to music in the future, however, he has been pictured with Laura Luppino and Oliver DeVille since then.

== Discography ==
=== Singles ===
| Year | Title | Chart ranking | | | |
| Year | Title | AT | DE | CH | NL |
|---|---|---|---|---|---|
| 2005 | "Dubi Dam Dam" | 2 | 2 | 5 | 36 |
| 2005 | "Space Cowboy" | 12 | 5 | 17 | |
| 2005 | "Coming Home For Christmas" | 5 | 9 | 9 | |
| 2006 | "Uh Mamma" | 3 | 9 | 11 | |
| 2006 | "Sing and Move (La La La Laaaa)" | 51 | 58 | 82 | |
| 2007 | "Ba Yonga Wamba" | 28 | 30 | 86 | |
| 2007 | "I'll Fly Away" | | 84 | | |
| 2013 | "Dubi Dam Dam 2013" | | | | |
| 2013 | "Space Cowboy 2013" | | | | |

=== Albums ===
| Year | Title | Chart ranking | | |
| Year | Title | DE | AT | CH |
|---|---|---|---|---|
| 2005 | Banaroo's World | 1 | 1 | 7 |
| 2005 | Christmas World | 12 | 5 | 26 |
| 2006 | Amazing | 6 | 2 | 25 |
| 2007 | Fly Away | 44 | 24 | 86 |
| 2007 | The Best Of Banaroo | | | |
| 2013 | Bubblegum World | | | |

=== DVD ===
- 2005: Banaroo – Der Film!
