= Dubi Dam Dam =

Single by Banaroo

from the album Banaroo's World
- B-side: "Make You See The Stars"
- Released: 5 June 2005
- Genre: Pop, dance-pop
- Length: 3:34
- Label: Universal
- Songwriter(s): Thorsten Brötzmann, Terri Bjerre, Ivo Moring
- Producer(s): Thorsten Brötzmann

Banaroo singles chronology
| "Dubi Dam Dam" (2005) | "Space Cowboy" (2005) |

Music video
- "Dubi Dam Dam" on YouTube

Dubi Dam Dam is the debut single by German pop group Banaroo, which was released on 5 June 2005 from their debut album, Banaroo's World (2005).

== Formats and track listings ==
These are the formats and track listings of major single releases of "Dubi Dam Dam."

Maxi CD

1. "Dubi Dam Dam" - 3:35
2. "Dubi Dam Dam" (Alien Space Mix) - 5:19
3. "Dubi Dam Dam" (Blue Starship Mix) - 5:10
4. "Dubi Dam Dam" (Instrumental) - 3:34
5. "Make You See The Stars" (Alternative Version) - 3:42

== Charts ==
=== Weekly charts ===
| Chart (2005) | Peak position |
|---|---|
| Austria (Ö3 Austria Top 40) | 2 |
| European Hot 100 Singles Sales (Billboard) | 8 |
| Germany (GfK) | 2 |
| Netherlands (Single Top 100) | 36 |
| Switzerland (Schweizer Hitparade) | 5 |

=== Year-end charts ===
| Chart (2005) | Position |
|---|---|
| Austria (Ö3 Austria Top 40) | 22 |
| Germany (Official German Charts) | 25 |
| Switzerland (Schweizer Hitparade) | 43 |
