= I'll Fly Away (Banaroo song) =

Single by Banaroo

from the album Fly Away
- B-side: "Summer In The Sun"
- Released: 4 May 2007
- Genre: Pop, dance-pop
- Length: 3:21
- Label: Universal
- Songwriter(s): Alex Geringas, Ivo Moring
- Producer(s): Alex Geringas, Ivo Moring

Banaroo singles chronology
"Ba Yonga Wamba" (2007)	"I'll Fly Away" (2007)

"I'll Fly Away" is the last single by the group Banaroo from their album Fly Away. It is also the final single to feature the original four members of Banaroo.

== Formats and track listings ==
These are the formats and track listings of major single releases of "I'll Fly Away".

Maxi CD

1. "I'll Fly Away" – 3:21
2. "Uh Mamma (Extendet Version)" - 4:57
3. "Uh Mamma (Karaoke Version)" - 43:19
4. "Summer In The Sun" - 3:33

== Charts ==
Chart (2007)	Peak position
Germany (GfK)	84
