= Bassersdorf =

- Municipality
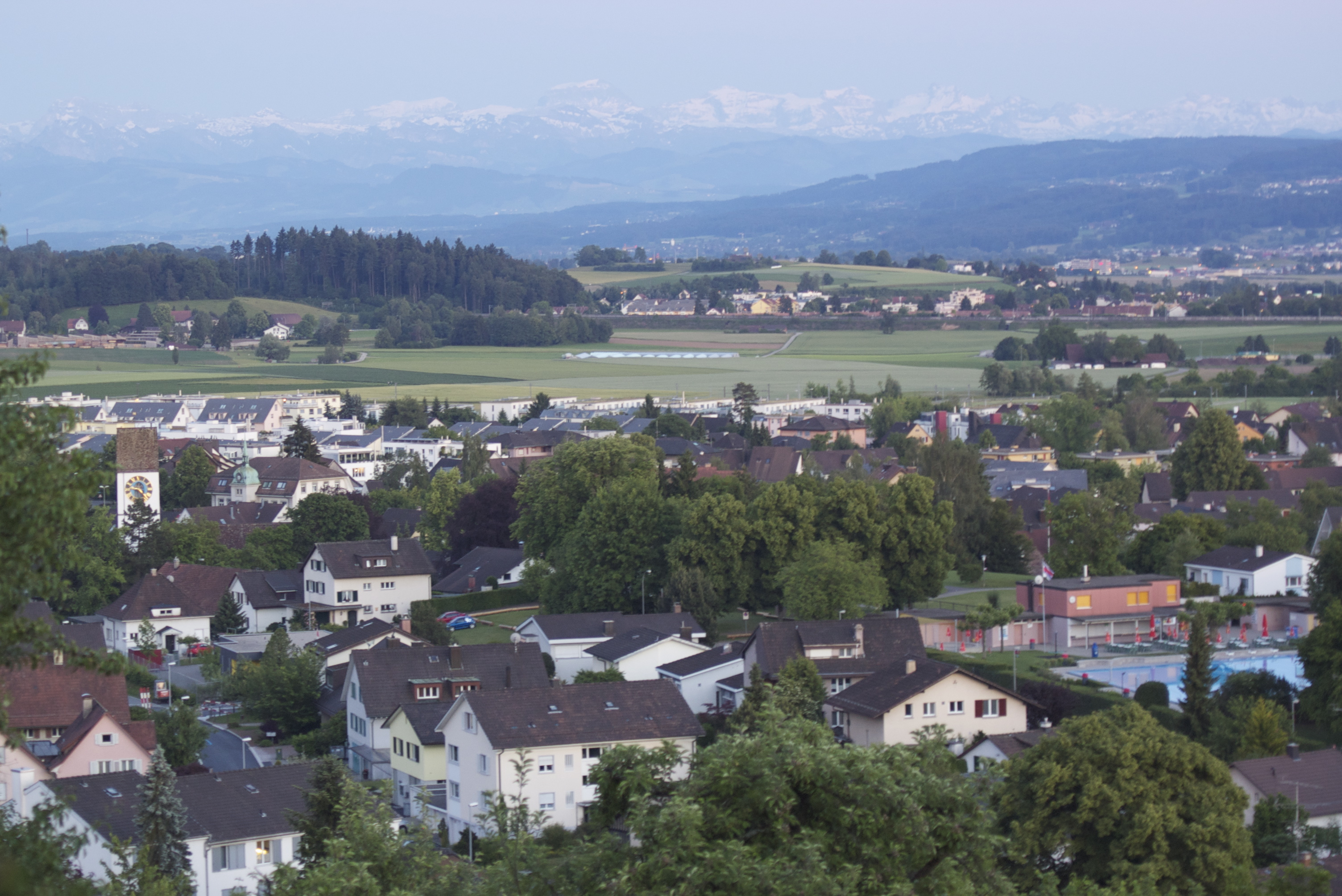

- Flag Coat of arms
- Location of Bassersdorf
- Location within Switzerland Location within Canton of Zürich
- Coordinates: 47°27′N 8°38′E
- Country: Switzerland
- Canton: Zürich
- District: Bülach

Area
  - Total: 9.02 km^{2} (3.48 sq mi)
- Elevation: 460 m (1,510 ft)

Population (December 2020)
  - Total: 11,924
  - Density: 1,320/km^{2} (3,420/sq mi)
- Time zone: UTC+01:00 (CET)
  - Summer (DST): UTC+02:00 (CEST)
- Postal code: 8303
- SFOS number: 52
- ISO 3166 code: CH-ZH
- Surrounded by: Dietlikon, Kloten, Lindau, Nürensdorf, Wangen-Brüttisellen
- Twin towns: Aigle (Switzerland)
- Website: www.bassersdorf.ch

Bassersdorf (German: Baßersdorf, High Alemannic: Baserschtoorff) is a municipality in the Swiss canton of Zürich, located in the district of Bülach, and belongs to the Glatt Valley (German: Glattal).

== History ==
The name, mentioned in 1155 as Bazzelstorf and maybe yet in the early 11th century as Basselstorff, is a compound consisting of dorf, a widespread constituent in alemannic placenames meaning ‚hamlet, farm, village, estate‘, and the genitive form of an anthroponym, probably OHG *Bazzilo (or its feminine Bacila, documented in the Abbey of St. Gall). The Alemannic settlement dates to the 8th or 9th century. Due to its position halfway between the towns of Zürich and Winterthur, the village gained some importance as a relay during the 18th and 19th centuries.

Under the Helvetic Republic (1798–1803), it was the district capital.

On November 24th 2001, Crossair Flight 3597 crashed into the ground at Bassersdorf while on approach to land at Zurich Airport. Twenty-four of the thirty-three people on board were killed, including American singer Melanie Thornton (the former lead singer of German group La Bouche) and two of the three members of the German group Passion Fruit. The investigation concluded that the accident was a controlled flight into terrain (CFIT) caused by a series of pilot errors and navigation mistakes that led the plane off-course. This course deviation caused the plane to crash into a hilltop, 4.05 km (2.52 mi) short of and 150 m (490 ft) north of its assigned landing strip, runway 28.

== Geography ==
Bassersdorf has an area of 9 square kilometers (3.5 sq mi). Of this area, 42.5% is used for agricultural purposes, while 30.8% is forested. Of the rest of the land, 26.3% is settled (buildings or roads) and the remainder (0.3%) is non-productive (rivers, glaciers or mountains).

The municipality is located on the edge of the mid-Glatt Valley. Since 1931, the village of Baltenswil has been part of the municipality.

== Schools ==
Bassersdorf has three primary schools:

- Chrüzacher, located near the town-centre of Bassersdorf.
- Geeren, located near the residential area of the Auenring.
- Steinlig, located in the northern part of Bassersdorf.

There‘s also a secondary school called Mösli, located right next to Steinlig.

== Demographics ==
Bassersdorf has a population (as of 31 December 2020) of 11,924. As of 2007, 21.2% of the population was made up of foreign nationals. Over the last 10 years the population has grown at a rate of 50.5%. Most of the population (as of 2000) speaks German (85.8%), with Italian being second most common ( 3.8%) and Serbo-Croatian being third ( 1.7%).

In the 2007 election the most popular party was the SVP which received 37.2% of the vote. The next three most popular parties were the SPS (19.6%), the FDP (12.4%) and the CSP (10.3%).

The current president of the municipality is Christian Pfaller (SVP). He has been the president since 2022.

The age distribution of the population (as of 2000) is children and teenagers (0–19 years old) make up 23.4% of the population, while adults (20–64 years old) make up 65.2% and seniors (over 64 years old) make up 11.4%. In Bassersdorf about 75.5% of the population (between age 25–64) have completed either non-mandatory upper secondary education or additional higher education (either university or a Fachhochschule). The historical population is given in the following table:

| year | population |
|---|---|
| 1420 | 39 Households |
| 1634 | 310 |
| 1710 | 718 |
| 1836 | 825 |
| 1850 | 959 |
| 1900 | 1,092 |
| 1950 | 2,143 |
| 1970 | 5,590 |
| 2000 | 7,515 |
| 2022 | 12,052 |

== Economy ==
Compaq at one point operated its Switzerland offices in Bassersdorf.

Bassersdorf has an unemployment rate of 3.46%. As of 2005, there were 53 people employed in the primary economic sector and about 17 businesses involved in this sector. 617 people are employed in the secondary sector and there are 67 businesses in this sector. 2380 people are employed in the tertiary sector, with 267 businesses in this sector.

== Transportation ==
Bassersdorf railway station is a stop of the S-Bahn Zürich on the lines S24 and S7. Bassersdorf is also served by the bus lines 765, 766, 769, which are operated by the VBG and the bus line 660, which is operated by the Stadtbus Winterthur.

== Twin towns – sister cities ==
Bassersdorf is twinned with:

- Aigle, Switzerland

== Gallery ==
Aerial view by Walter Mittelholzer (1920)

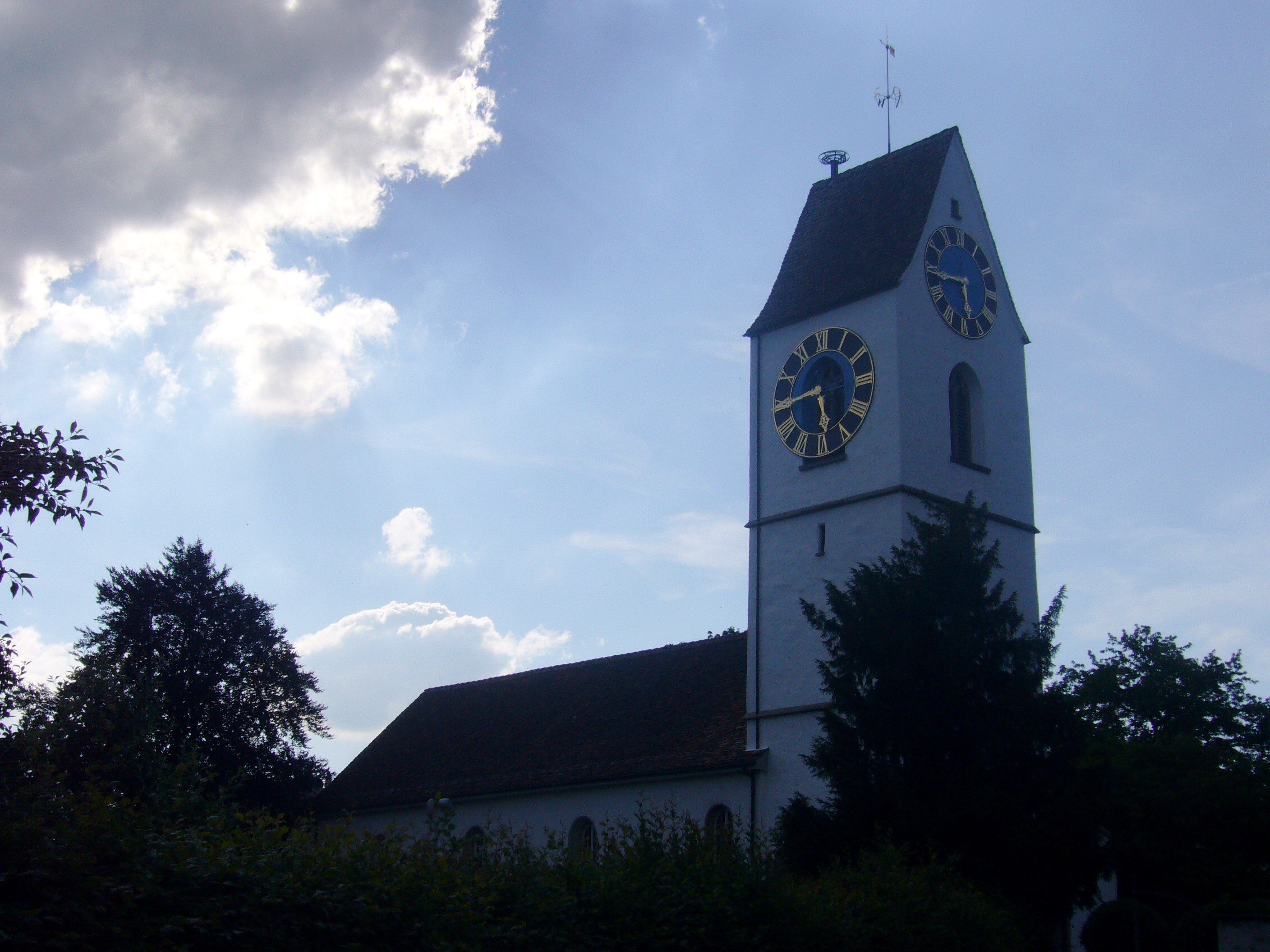
St. Johannis Church

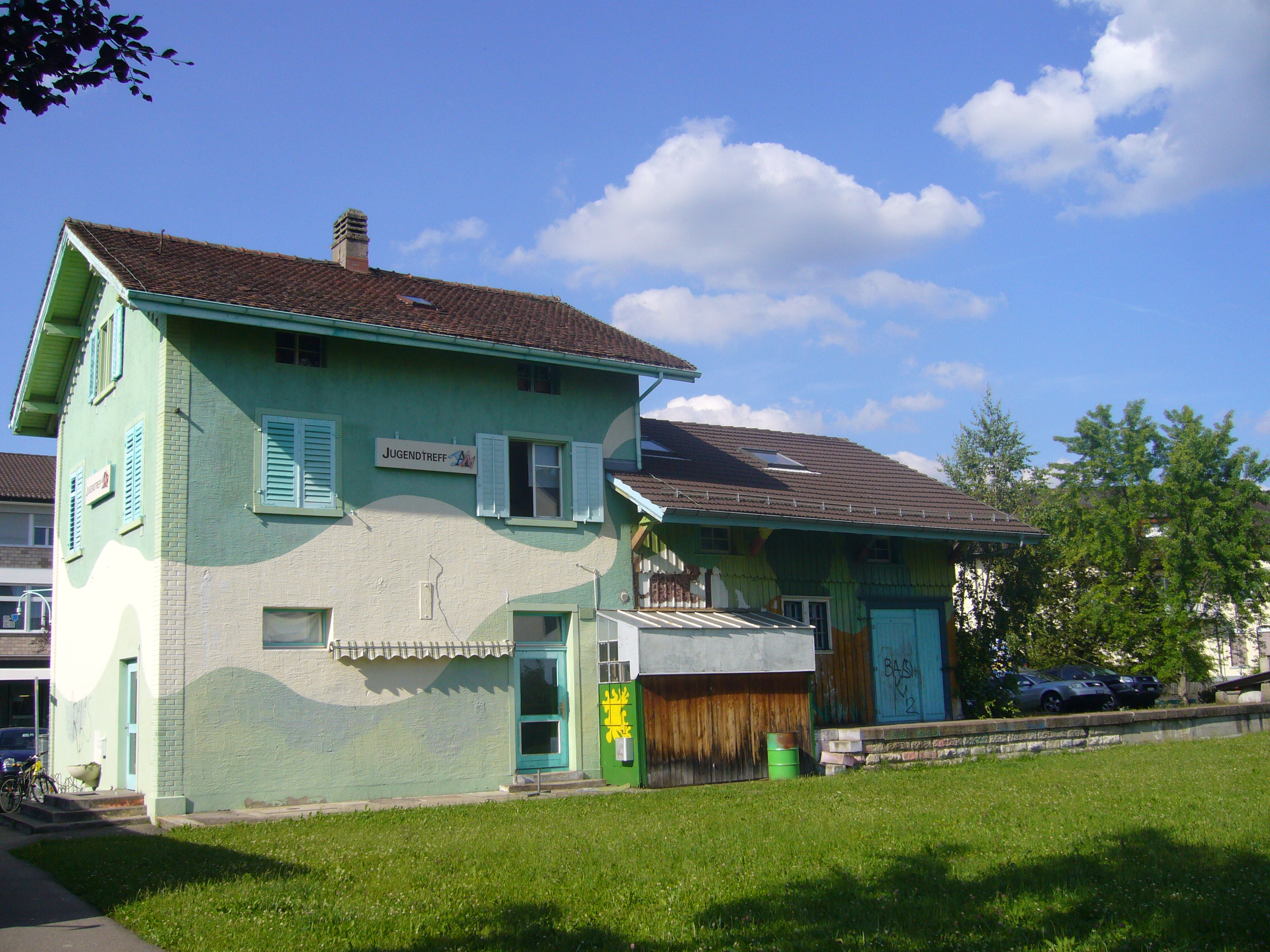
Former train-station (relocated in 1980, destroyed in 2015)

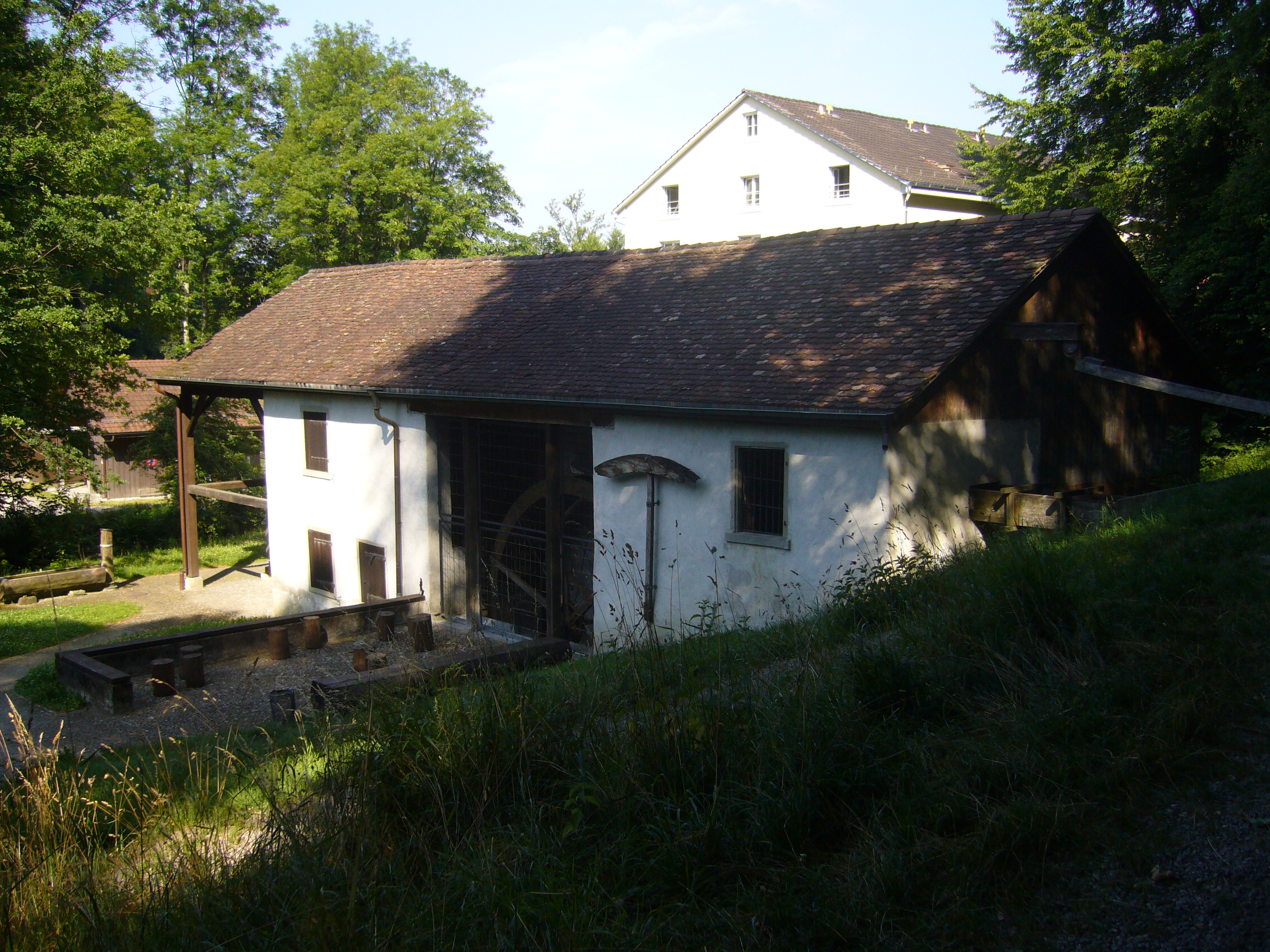
Sawmill in the Wisental

== Notable people ==
- Elsie Attenhofer (1909 - 1999 in Bassersdorf) a Swiss cabaret artiste, actress, writer and performer of monologues
- Roy Gelmi (born 1995 in Bassersdorf) a Swiss footballer who plays for VVV-Venlo
