= Passion Fruit (group) =

German musical group

- Origin: Berlin, Germany
- Genres: Dance-pop, Eurodance
- Years active: 1999–2001
- Labels: X-Cell Records, Epic, Edel Records, RTL Musikedition
- Past members: 1st generation Manye "Blade" Thompson; Viola "Dawn" Schubbe; Carla "Pearl" Sinclair; Mario "MC Steve" Zuber 2nd generation María Serrano Serrano †; Nathalie van het Ende †; Debby St. Maarten Studio vocalists Leticia Pareja-Padron; Kenneth Clemmons

Passion Fruit was a German-Dutch Eurodance trio. The first-generation line-up was formed with Blade (Manye Thompson), Dawn (Viola Schubbe), Pearl (Carla Sinclair), and MC Steve (Mario Zuber). The second generation was formed with Dutch singers Nathalie van het Ende and Debby St. Maarten and German singer María Serrano Serrano. The lyrics for their songs are a combination of English and Spanish. They were managed by Georg Bergheim. The lead vocalists for the group were Leticia Spormann and Kenneth Clemmons.

Named after the tropical fruit, Passion Fruit got its start in 1999 with its debut hit single "The Rigga-Ding-Dong-Song." The single reached the Top 20 charts in many European countries, including Germany, Austria, Switzerland, and the Netherlands. The singles "Wonderland," "Sun Fun Baby (Looky Looky)," and "Bongo Man" were released from 2000 to 2001 and charted in the Top 40 on the German and Austrian singles charts. "I'm Dreaming of... A Winter Wonderland" was released in December 2001, just nine days after María Serrano Serrano and Nathalie van het Ende were killed in the crash of Crossair Flight 3597, and it became a minor hit, reaching number 56 on the Swiss singles charts and number 72 on the German singles charts.

== First-generation line-up ==
- Blade (Manye Thompson)
- Dawn (Viola Schubbe)
- Pearl (Carla Sinclair)
- MC Steve (Mario Zuber)

The first line up was established in June 1999 after the release of "The Rigga-Ding-Dong-Song," but the line-up soon parted ways in October due to internal disagreements and creative differences. Mario Zuber would go on to become an actor and Manye Thompson was featured on the song "Staying Amazing" by the Märtini Brös.

== Second-generation line-up ==
- Nathalie van het Ende † (Born. 2 January 1975, in Amsterdam, Netherlands – Died. 24 November 2001) (aged 26)
- María Serrano Serrano † (Born. 26 November 1973, in Duisburg, Germany – Died. 24 November 2001) (aged 27)
- Debby St. Maarten (Born. 1973 in Delft, Netherlands)

The second line-up replaced the first line-up in January 2000 with the release of "Wonderland". Before joining the group, María worked as a trained nurse and a model, and she gave birth to German rapper Jamule in 1996. Nathalie and Debby both worked as background dancers and singers before joining the group. In 1995 Nathalie took third place in the Miss Holland pageant. In October 2001, the trio appeared in the German Playboy magazine with a photo of them topless.

Nathalie and Debby were both born in The Netherlands and María was born in Germany, but she was largely of Spanish descent.

== Plane crash and the end of the group ==
On 24 November 2001, the group performed in Leipzig as the opening act for Melanie Thornton during her Christmas tour for Coca-Cola. Two hours after the show ended, Thornton and the group were driven to the Berlin Airport to catch the next flight to Zurich for their next show. Thornton and the group, along with 24 other passengers and the 5 flight crew members, boarded Crossair Flight #3597 that took off at 9:01PM only to fatally crash one hour later. During the flight's final approach to Zurich Airport, the plane's captain (Hans Lutz) made a fatal decision by descending too early while attempting to spot the runway due to poor visibility and failing to read the DME, which would have told him how far from the runway he actually was.

At 10:07PM, the plane crashed into a hilltop in a forest area, located in the town Bassersdorf, just 2.5 kilometers from the runway at Zurich Airport. One of the survivors stated that about 5 seconds after crashing onto the ground, the plane went up in flames. María Serrano Serrano, Nathalie van het Ende, and Melanie Thornton were among the 24 people that lost their lives in the crash, while Debby St. Maarten was among the 9 people that survived. St. Maarten was rushed to the hospital to receive treatment for her wounds and doctors discovered that she had second and third degree burns on her hands and face and multiple bruises.

"I'm Dreaming of...A Winter Wonderland" was released posthumously nine days later on 3 December and the royalties that the single made were donated to the victims' families and survivors of the accident. After the single was released, Passion Fruit permanently disbanded and no more singles or albums were released.

== Post-accident ==
St. Maarten continued to have ongoing treatment for her injuries for the next five years. She occasionally posted messages on the official Passion Fruit Web site, usually each November around the anniversary of the accident, in tribute to Serrano and Het Ende. On 5 December 2006, she appeared in an interview on the German ZDF television network, Hallo Deutschland, which showed her visiting the site of the crash with her family, and she announced that she had recorded some songs for her solo album; however, due to her health complications and other personal reasons, she decided that music was no longer the career she wanted, and the album was eventually shelved by her manager. In 2007, after St. Maarten had fully recovered, she moved back to her hometown in the Netherlands to work as a social worker.

She was interviewed for the 20th anniversary of the crash on 28 November 2021 episode of the German television show Prominent!. She explained in the interview that she knew that Serrano and Het Ende were dead during the events of the accident because she called out their names but got no response. She also said that once she was discharged from the hospital some people would act uncomfortable around her when they saw her scars and she would often try to cover herself up even when it was warm outside and she also said that it took her six years to figure out what she wanted to do instead of performing.

== Second-album release and other material ==
Passion Fruit had been working on a second studio album in mid-2001, shortly before the airplane crash. Only two singles were released during this period, "Bongo Man" and "I'm Dreaming Of...A Winter Wonderland." The second album would have been the first release under Passion Fruit's new label, Edel, however, it was shelved after the accident. The single "Bongo Man" featured the previously released song "Passion Gang (Ladadi)" as a bonus track. The single "I'm Dreaming of...A Winter Wonderland" included an altered version of "White Christmas" (with mostly the original lyrics and a different chorus) and two mixes of the "Winter Wonderland" version.

The song "P.A.S.S.I.O.N." was recorded in 1999 and was intended to appear on the album Spanglish Love Affairs, but was later cut. It was released later, with the single "Sun Fun Baby (Looky Looky)", as a bonus track.

The 2004 song "Kiss Me (Na, Na, Na)", released by Cuban-German singer Leticia Spormann (who recorded vocals for most of Passion Fruit's earlier releases on the Edel label), is believed to have been meant for Passion Fruit, likely for the shelved second album.

"I'm Dreaming of...A Winter Wonderland" was released on all streaming platforms in 2014 and Spanglish Love Affairs and its other singles were released onto streaming platforms in December 2023.

== The vocalists behind Passion Fruit ==
Adding to the delay in new music was that, in a scenario that was similar of Milli Vanilli (albeit with more transparency), the majority of Passion Fruit's songs had long been performed as lip-synch numbers by both line-ups. The original recorded vocals were credited to Cuban-German singer Leticia Pareja-Padrón, also known as Leticia Spormann (b. 23 February 1971) and the recorded rap verses were credited to German rapper and producer Kenneth Clemmons, from Flensburg.

"I'm Dreaming of...A Winter Wonderland" was the sole single for which the second line-up was credited for recording most of the vocals, although it also featured some vocals from Leticia with a second German singer, Anja Bublitz (b. 21 September 1969).

== Discography ==
=== Album ===
Title & Details
Spanglish Love Affairs	Released: 10 April 2000; Label: X-Cell Records, Epic; Format: CD Stereo

=== Singles ===
Release date	Title	Peak chart positions						Album
Release date	Title	GER	AUS	AUT	CZE	NLD	SWI	Album
7 June 1999	"The Rigga-Ding-Dong-Song"	9	85	9	—	15	7	Spanglish Love Affairs
13 March 2000	"Wonderland"	22	—	11	9	—	69	Spanglish Love Affairs
5 June 2000	"Sun Fun Baby (Looky Looky)"	34	—	33	—	—	81	Spanglish Love Affairs
25 June 2001	"Bongo Man"	35	—	44	—	—	81	
3 December 2001	"I'm Dreaming of...A Winter Wonderland"	72	—	63	—	—	56	
